= 2016 Atlético Nacional season =

Atlético Nacional
2016 season
- Chairman: Juan Carlos de la Cuesta
- Manager: Reinaldo Rueda
- Stadium: Atanasio Girardot
- Categoría Primera A: Apertura: Semifinals; Finalización: Semifinals
- Copa Colombia: Champions
- Superliga Colombiana: Winners
- Copa Libertadores: Champions
- Copa Sudamericana: Runners-up
- FIFA Club World Cup: Third place
- Top goalscorer: League: Orlando Berrío, Andrés Ibargüen, Macnelly Torres (9 goals each); All: Miguel Borja, Orlando Berrío (17 goals each)
- Average home league attendance: 30,295 (A) 25,691 (C)
Home colours	Away colours	Third colours

The 2016 Atlético Nacional season was the 69th season in the club's history. The team competed in the Categoría Primera A, Copa Colombia, Superliga Colombiana, Copa Libertadores, Copa Sudamericana and FIFA Club World Cup.

== Players ==
=== First-team squad ===
As of 16 October 2016

Note: Flags indicate national team as defined under FIFA eligibility rules; some limited exceptions apply. Players may hold more than one non-FIFA nationality.

No.	Pos.	Nation	Player
1	GK	COL	Cristian Bonilla
2	DF	COL	Daniel Bocanegra
3	DF	COL	Felipe Aguilar
4	DF	PAN	Roderick Miller
5	DF	COL	Francisco Nájera
6	MF	COL	Mateus Uribe
7	FW	ARG	Ezequiel Rescaldani
8	MF	COL	Diego Arias
9	FW	COL	Miguel Borja
10	MF	COL	Macnelly Torres
11	MF	COL	Andrés Ibargüen
12	DF	COL	Alexis Henríquez
14	MF	COL	Elkin Blanco
15	MF	COL	Juan Pablo Nieto
16	FW	COL	Cristián Dajome (on loan from Deportes Tolima)
17	DF	COL	Rodin Quiñónes

No.	Pos.	Nation	Player
18	MF	VEN	Alejandro Guerra (on loan from Mineros de Guayana)
19	DF	COL	Farid Díaz
20	MF	COL	Alejandro Bernal
21	MF	COL	Jhon Mosquera
22	DF	COL	Gilberto García
23	DF	COL	Edwin Velasco
25	GK	COL	Christian Vargas
26	DF	COL	Carlos Cuesta
27	MF	COL	Juan Pablo Ramírez
28	FW	COL	Orlando Berrío
30	FW	COL	Arley Rodríguez
31	MF	COL	Dayron Mosquera
32	DF	COL	Tomás Maya
33	FW	COL	Sebastián Támara
34	GK	ARG	Franco Armani
35	GK	COL	Luis Enrique Martínez

=== Out on loan ===
Note: Flags indicate national team as defined under FIFA eligibility rules; some limited exceptions apply. Players may hold more than one non-FIFA nationality.

No.	Pos.	Nation	Player
–	GK	COL	Camilo Vargas (at Deportivo Cali)
–	DF	COL	Juan Guillermo Arboleda (at Alianza Petrolera)
–	DF	COL	Cristian Cassiani (at Leones)
–	DF	COL	Juan David Castañeda (at Cortuluá)
–	DF	COL	José Luis García (at Real Santander)
–	DF	COL	Esteban Morales (at Bogotá)
–	DF	COL	Jeisson Palacios (at Alianza Petrolera)

No.	Pos.	Nation	Player
–	DF	COL	Diego Peralta (at Atlético Bucaramanga)
–	MF	COL	Víctor Cantillo (at Leones)
–	MF	COL	Sherman Cárdenas (at Vitória)
–	MF	COL	Julián Mendoza (at Real Cartagena)
–	MF	COL	John Henry Sánchez (at Olimpia)
–	FW	COL	Leonardo Acevedo (at Sporting CP B)
–	FW	COL	Luis Carlos Ruiz (at Sport Recife)

== Transfers ==
Source: Soccerway

=== In ===
Pos.	Name	Age	Moving from	Type	Date
FW	(Argentina) Ezequiel Rescaldani	24	(Spain) Málaga	Transfer	1 July 2016
MF	(Colombia) Mateus Uribe	25	(Colombia) Envigado	Transfer	1 July 2016
DF	(Panama) Roderick Miller	24	(Panama) San Francisco	Transfer	1 July 2016
MF	(Colombia) Jhon Mosquera	26	(Spain) Hércules	Transfer	1 July 2016
GK	(Colombia) Christian Vargas	26	(Colombia) Atlético Huila	Loan return	1 July 2016
MF	(Colombia) Elkin Blanco	27	(Colombia) Millonarios	Transfer	1 July 2016
FW	(Colombia) Cristián Dajome	22	(Colombia) Deportes Tolima	Loan	1 July 2016
DF	(Colombia) Edwin Velasco	24	(Colombia) Cortuluá	Transfer	1 July 2016
FW	(Colombia) Miguel Borja	23	(Colombia) Cortuluá	Transfer	1 July 2016
FW	(Colombia) Víctor Ibarbo	25	(Italy) Cagliari	Loan	15 January 2016
DF	(Colombia) Felipe Aguilar	22	(Colombia) Alianza Petrolera	Loan return	31 December 2015
GK	(Colombia) Cristian Bonilla	22	(Colombia) La Equidad	Loan return	31 December 2015
FW	(Colombia) Juan David Castañeda	20	(Colombia) Leones	Loan return	31 December 2015
MF	(Colombia) Juan Pablo Nieto	22	(Colombia) Alianza Petrolera	Loan return	31 December 2015
DF	(Colombia) Daniel Londoño	21	(Colombia) Envigado	Transfer	31 December 2015
FW	(Colombia) Arley Rodríguez	22	(Colombia) Alianza Petrolera	Loan return	31 December 2015
FW	(Colombia) Andrés Ibargüen	23	(Colombia) Deportes Tolima	Transfer	31 December 2015
MF	(Colombia) Sherman Cárdenas	26	(Brazil) Atlético Mineiro	Loan return	31 December 2015

=== Out ===
Pos.	Name	Age	Moving to	Type	Date
MF	(Colombia) Sebastián Pérez Cardona	23	(Argentina) Boca Juniors	Transfer	14 August 2016
FW	(Colombia) Marlos Moreno	19	(England) Manchester City	Transfer	5 August 2016
MF	(Colombia) Alexander Mejía	28	(Mexico) Monterrey	Loan return	30 July 2016
DF	(Colombia) Davinson Sánchez	20	(Netherlands) Ajax	Transfer	30 July 2016
FW	(Paraguay) Pablo Zeballos	30	Unattached	Transfer	30 July 2016
MF	(Colombia) John Henry Sánchez	21	(Honduras) Olimpia	Loan	26 July 2016
MF	(Colombia) Sherman Cárdenas	26	(Brazil) Vitória	Loan	21 July 2016
FW	(Colombia) Luis Carlos Ruiz	29	(Brazil) Sport Recife	Loan	21 July 2016
FW	(Colombia) Leonardo Acevedo	20	(Portugal) Sporting CP B	Loan	20 July 2016
FW	(Colombia) Jefferson Duque	29	(Mexico) Atlas	Transfer	1 July 2016
FW	(Colombia) Brayan Rovira	19	(Colombia) Envigado	Transfer	1 July 2016
DF	(Colombia) Daniel Londoño	21	(Colombia) Atlético Huila	Transfer	1 July 2016
DF	(Colombia) Juan David Castañeda	21	(Colombia) Cortuluá	Loan	1 July 2016
GK	(Colombia) Camilo Vargas	27	(Colombia) Deportivo Cali	Loan	1 July 2016
FW	(Colombia) Víctor Ibarbo	26	(Italy) Cagliari	Loan return	30 June 2016
DF	(Colombia) Diego Peralta	31	(Colombia) Atlético Bucaramanga	Loan	11 June 2016
FW	(Colombia) Jonathan Copete	28	(Brazil) Santos	Transfer	18 May 2016
DF	(Colombia) Marlon Torres	19	(Colombia) Leones	Transfer	29 January 2016
FW	(Colombia) Jefferson Duque	28	(Mexico) Atlas	Loan	28 January 2016
MF	(Colombia) Jairo Palomino	27	(Colombia) Once Caldas	Transfer	21 January 2016
GK	(Colombia) Camilo Vargas	26	(Argentina) Argentinos Juniors	Loan	14 January 2016
FW	(Paraguay) Pablo Zeballos	29	(Paraguay) Libertad	Loan	7 January 2016
FW	(Colombia) Yimmi Chará	24	(Mexico) Monterrey	Loan return	31 December 2015
MF	(Colombia) Juan David Valencia	29	(Colombia) Santa Fe	Transfer	31 December 2015
FW	(Colombia) Andrés Ramiro Escobar	24	(Ukraine) FC Dynamo Kyiv	Loan return	31 December 2015
GK	(Colombia) Christian Vargas	26	(Colombia) Atlético Huila	Loan	31 December 2015
MF	(Colombia) Yulián Mejía	25	(Colombia) Millonarios	Transfer	31 December 2015
DF	(Colombia) Miller Mosquera	23	(Colombia) La Equidad	Transfer	31 December 2015
DF	(Colombia) Edisson Restrepo	19	(Colombia) Leones	Transfer	31 December 2015
DF	(Colombia) Deivy Balanta	22	(Colombia) Junior	Transfer	31 December 2015
DF	(Colombia) Julián Franco	22	Unattached	Transfer	31 December 2015
DF	(Colombia) Felipe Álvarez	22	(Colombia) Deportivo Pasto	Transfer	31 December 2015
MF	(Colombia) Rafael Carrascal	23	(Colombia) Millonarios	Transfer	31 December 2015
DF	(Colombia) Luis Arturo Muriel	22	Unattached	Transfer	31 December 2015
MF	(Colombia) Róger Torres	24	(Colombia) Alianza Petrolera	Transfer	31 December 2015
MF	(Colombia) John Henry Sánchez	20	(Colombia) Alianza Petrolera	Loan	31 December 2015
DF	(Colombia) Óscar Murillo	27	(Mexico) Pachuca	Transfer	27 December 2015

== Pre-season and friendlies ==
Match won	Match drawn	Match lost

13 January Copa Los Clásicos Miami	América de Cali (Colombia)	0–2	(Colombia) Atlético Nacional	Miami, United States
21:00		Report	Guerra 1'; Pérez 9'	Stadium: FIU Stadium; Referee: Jorge González (United States)

16 January Copa Los Clásicos Miami	Atlético Nacional (Colombia)	0–1	(Colombia) Independiente Medellín	Miami, United States
16:00		Report	Hechalar 89'	Stadium: FIU Stadium

25 June Friendly	Atlético Nacional (Colombia)	1–1	(Venezuela) Zamora	Guarne, Colombia
09:00	Ruiz	Report	Goal	Stadium: Guarne stadium

25 June Friendly	Atlético Nacional (Colombia)	2–1	(Venezuela) Zamora	Guarne, Colombia
10:35	Dájome; Borja	Report	Goal	Stadium: Guarne stadium

== Competitions ==
=== Overall ===
Competition	Started round	Final position / round	First match	Last match
Superliga Colombiana	Final	Winners	23 January 2016	27 January 2016
Categoría Primera A Torneo Apertura	Matchday 1	Semifinals	31 January 2016	11 June 2016
Copa Libertadores	Group stage	Winners	23 February 2016	27 July 2016
Categoría Primera A Torneo Finalización	Matchday 1	Semifinals	1 July 2016	11 December 2016
Copa Colombia	Round of 16	Winners	3 August 2016	17 November 2016
Copa Sudamericana	First Stage	Runners-up	11 August 2016	7 December
FIFA Club World Cup	Semi-finals	Third place	14 December 2016	18 December 2016

Updated to match played 19 December 2016
Source: Competitions

=== Overview ===
Competition	First match	Last match	Starting round	Final position	Record							
Competition	First match	Last match	Starting round	Final position	Pld	W	D	L	GF	GA	GD	Win %
Categoría Primera A	31 January 2016	11 December 2016	Matchday 1 Apertura	Semi-finals Finalización	44	21	17	6	77	42	+35	47.73
Copa Colombia	3 August 2016	17 November 2016	Round of 16	Winners	8	5	1	2	15	7	+8	62.50
Superliga Colombiana	23 January 2016	27 January 2016	Final	Winners	2	2	0	0	5	0	+5	100.00
Copa Libertadores	23 February 2016	27 July 2016	Group stage	Winners	14	10	3	1	25	6	+19	71.43
Copa Sudamericana	11 August 2016	24 November 2016	First Stage	Runners-up	10	5	5	0	16	5	+11	50.00
FIFA Club World Cup	21 February 2023	28 February 2023	Semi-final	3rd	2	0	1	1	2	5	−3	0.00
Total					80	43	27	10	140	65	+75	53.75

Source: Competitions

=== Superliga Colombiana ===
Match won	Match drawn	Match lost

23 January Away	Deportivo Cali	0–2	Atlético Nacional	Palmira
		Report	Copete 25', 84'	Stadium: Estadio Deportivo Cali; Attendance: 21,000; Referee: Juan Carlos Gamarra

27 January Home	Atlético Nacional	3–0	Deportivo Cali	Medellín
19:00	Torres 4'; Pérez 50'; Ruiz 88'	Report		Stadium: Estadio Atanasio Girardot; Attendance: 42,115; Referee: Nicolás Gallo

=== Categoría Primera A ===
==== Torneo Apertura ====
Pos	Team	Pld	W	D	L	GF	GA	GD	Pts	Qualification
1	Independiente Medellín	20	11	7	2	33	17	+16	40	Advanced to the knockout phase
2	Atlético Nacional	20	12	3	5	42	20	+22	39	Advanced to the knockout phase
3	Millonarios	20	11	4	5	30	17	+13	37	Advanced to the knockout phase
4	Santa Fe	20	11	4	5	28	18	+10	37	Advanced to the knockout phase
5	Junior	20	10	7	3	28	20	+8	37	Advanced to the knockout phase

Source: DIMAYOR
Rules for classification: 1) Points, 2) Goal difference, 3) Goals for, 4) Away goals for, 5) Away goals against, 6) Drawing of lots

===== Home-away summary =====
Home
Pos	Team	Pld	W	D	L	GF	GA	GD	Pts
2	Atlético Nacional	10	8	0	2	26	8	+18	24

Away
Pos	Team	Pld	W	D	L	GF	GA	GD	Pts
2	Atlético Nacional	10	4	3	3	16	12	+4	15

===== Match results =====
Match won	Match drawn	Match lost

31 January 1	Atlético Nacional	3–1	Alianza Petrolera	Medellín
17:00	Berrío 3', 46'; Guerra 76'	Report	Romero 36' (pen.)	Stadium: Estadio Atanasio Girardot; Attendance: 30,982; Referee: Carlos Herrera

7 February 2	Jaguares	0–3	Atlético Nacional	Montería
15:15		Report	Torres 20'; Copete 37'; Berrío 82'	Stadium: Estadio Jaraguay; Attendance: 8,000; Referee: Juan Carlos Gamarra

13 February 3	Atlético Nacional	1–0	Rionegro Águilas	Medellín
20:00	López 30' (o.g.)	Report		Stadium: Estadio Atanasio Girardot; Attendance: 29,798; Referee: Gustavo González

16 February 4	Deportes Tolima	2–0	Atlético Nacional	Ibagué
19:45	Uribe 61'; Delgado 84'	Report		Stadium: Estadio Manuel Murillo Toro; Attendance: 6,000; Referee: Luis Sánchez

27 February 7	Once Caldas	0–3	Atlético Nacional	Manizales
20:00		Report	Cárdenas 29'; Guerra 69', 80'	Stadium: Estadio Palogrande; Attendance: 26,000; Referee: Gustavo Murillo

5 March 8	Atlético Nacional	2–0	Boyacá Chicó	Medellín
17:00	L. Ruiz 27'; Ibargüen 58'	Report		Stadium: Estadio Atanasio Girardot; Attendance: 31,155; Referee: Nicolás Gallo

20 March 10	Independiente Medellín	1–1	Atlético Nacional	Medellín
15:15	Molina 4'	Report	Ibargüen 64'	Stadium: Estadio Atanasio Girardot; Attendance: 40,953; Referee: Wilmar Roldán

27 March 6^{†}	Atlético Nacional	2–1	Deportivo Cali	Medellín
	Torres 7'; A. Rodríguez 88'	Report	Casierra 5'	Stadium: Estadio Atanasio Girardot; Attendance: 32,339; Referee: Harold Perilla

31 March 9^{†}	Millonarios	2–1	Atlético Nacional	Bogotá
19:45	Silva 57', 65'	Report	Berrío 90+2'	Stadium: Estadio El Campín; Attendance: 32,791; Referee: Luis Sánchez

3 April 11	Atlético Nacional	7–0	Atlético Bucaramanga	Medellín
16:00	Ibargüen 13', 28', 43'; Guerra 49'; Ruiz 70'; Bocanegra 75'; Quiñónes 86'	Report		Stadium: Estadio Atanasio Girardot; Attendance: 30,161; Referee: Andrés Rojas

6 April 5^{†}	Atlético Nacional	4–1	Fortaleza	Medellín
19:45	Torres 62', 90'; Castañeda 72'; Ibargüen 78'	Report	Ospina 58'	Stadium: Estadio Atanasio Girardot; Attendance: 25,704; Referee: Hervin Otero

9 April 12	Junior	3–3	Atlético Nacional	Barranquilla
16:15	Hernández 52' (pen.); Ovelar 82'; Barrera 86'	Report	Guerra 19'; Ruiz 55' (pen.); Copete 90+2'	Stadium: Estadio Metropolitano Roberto Meléndez; Attendance: 40,415; Referee: Juan Pontón

16 April 13	Atlético Nacional	3–2	Envigado	Medellín
16:00	Copete 53'; Berrío 69', 79'	Report	Diego Gregori 49'; Moreno 57'	Stadium: Estadio Atanasio Girardot; Attendance: 25,802; Referee: Óscar Gómez

23 April 14	Cortuluá	2–0	Atlético Nacional	Tuluá
	Borja 20', 46'	Report		Stadium: Estadio Doce de Octubre; Attendance: 10,000; Referee: Gustavo Murillo

1 May 16	Atlético Huila	0–1	Atlético Nacional	Neiva
15:15		Report	Nieto 67'	Stadium: Estadio Guillermo Plazas Alcid; Attendance: 2,000; Referee: Andrés Rojas

7 May 17	Atlético Nacional	1–2	Independiente Medellín	Medellín
	Torres 30'	Report	Castro 35', 52'	Stadium: Estadio Atanasio Girardot; Attendance: 40,362; Referee: Wilson Lamouroux

15 May 18	Patriotas	2–2	Atlético Nacional	Tunja
	Rosero 22'; Gómez 38'	Report	Torres 12', 45+2'	Stadium: Estadio de La Independencia; Attendance: 5,000; Referee: Carlos Anaya

22 May 19	Atlético Nacional	0–1	Santa Fe	Medellín
		Report	Mina 17'	Stadium: Estadio Atanasio Girardot; Attendance: 35,021; Referee: Nolberto Ararat

25 May 15^{†}	Atlético Nacional	3–0	La Equidad	Medellín
19:45	Berrío 14', 21'; Bocanegra 77'	Report		Stadium: Estadio Atanasio Girardot; Attendance: 21,630; Referee: Luis Trujillo

28 May 20	Deportivo Pasto	0–2	Atlético Nacional	Pasto
		Report	Bocanegra 6', 58'	Stadium: Estadio Departamental Libertad; Referee: Roberto Rodríguez

†: Matches postponed due to participation in the Copa Libertadores.

Knockout phase

===== Quarterfinals =====
1 June First leg	Rionegro Águilas	1–1	Atlético Nacional	Rionegro
18:00	Álvarez 6'	Report	Ibargüen 23'	Stadium: Estadio Alberto Grisales; Attendance: 10,000; Referee: Gustavo Murillo

4 June Second leg	Atlético Nacional	1–1 (5–4 p)	Rionegro Águilas	Medellín
17:00	Ibarbo 41'	Report	Palomino 19'	Stadium: Estadio Atanasio Girardot; Attendance: 27,723; Referee: Nicolás Gallo
	Penalties
	Henríquez (penalty scored); Nieto (penalty missed); A. Rodríguez (penalty scored); Sánchez (penalty missed); Ibarbo (penalty scored); Mejía (penalty scored); Cárdenas (penalty scored)		(penalty missed) Palomino; (penalty missed) López; (penalty scored) F. Rodríguez; (penalty scored) Díaz; (penalty scored) Páez; (penalty scored) Chará; (penalty missed) Mosquera

===== Semifinals =====
8 June First leg	Junior	1–1	Atlético Nacional	Barranquilla
19:00	Hernández 74'	Report	Bocanegra 18'	Stadium: Estadio Metropolitano Roberto Meléndez; Referee: Luis Sánchez

11 June Second leg	Atlético Nacional	0–0 (2–4 p)	Junior	Medellín
15:00				Stadium: Estadio Atanasio Girardot; Attendance: 44,451; Referee: Harold Perilla
	Penalties
	Henríquez (penalty missed); Ibargüen (penalty scored); Sánchez (penalty scored); Rodríguez (penalty missed)		(penalty scored) Hernández; (penalty missed) Arias; (penalty scored) Sánchez; (penalty scored) Narváez; (penalty scored) Barrera

==== Torneo Finalización ====
Pos	Team	Pld	W	D	L	GF	GA	GD	Pts	Qualification
1	Atlético Nacional	20	9	10	1	32	19	+13	37	Advanced to the knockout phase
2	Deportivo Cali	20	10	4	6	25	17	+8	34	Advanced to the knockout phase
3	Deportes Tolima	20	8	9	3	25	16	+9	33	Advanced to the knockout phase
4	Santa Fe	20	9	6	5	22	15	+7	33	Advanced to the knockout phase
5	Independiente Medellín	20	9	6	5	31	26	+5	33	Advanced to the knockout phase

Source: DIMAYOR
Rules for classification: 1) Points, 2) Goal difference, 3) Goals for, 4) Away goals for, 5) Away goals against, 6) Drawing of lots

===== Home-away summary =====
Home
Pos	Team	Pld	W	D	L	GF	GA	GD	Pts
1	Atlético Nacional	10	7	3	0	19	8	+11	24

Away
Pos	Team	Pld	W	D	L	GF	GA	GD	Pts
1	Atlético Nacional	10	2	7	1	13	11	+2	13

===== Match results =====
Match won	Match drawn	Match lost

1 July 1	Alianza Petrolera	3–3	Atlético Nacional	Barrancabermeja
20:00	Ariza 21'; Palacios 48'; Vásquez 71'	Report	Ramírez 40'; Arias 51'; Rodríguez 62'	Stadium: Estadio Daniel Villa Zapata; Attendance: 8,500; Referee: Luis Fernando Trujillo

10 July 2	Atlético Nacional	2–1	Jaguares	Medellín
17:30	Velasco 61'; Ibargüen 66'	Report	D. López 16' (pen.)	Stadium: Estadio Atanasio Girardot; Attendance: 27,676; Referee: Jorge Guzmán

16 July 4	Atlético Nacional	2–2	Deportes Tolima	Medellín
19:45	Rescaldani 53', 77'	Report	Mosquera 36'; Alzate 56'	Stadium: Estadio Atanasio Girardot; Attendance: 23,072; Referee: Harold Perilla

23 July 5	Fortaleza	0–1	Atlético Nacional	Bogotá
20:00		Report	Bernal 7' (pen.)	Stadium: Estadio Metropolitano de Techo; Attendance: 10,000; Referee: Mario Herrera

31 July 6	Deportivo Cali	1–0	Atlético Nacional	Palmira
17:00	Mera 13'	Report		Stadium: Estadio Deportivo Cali; Attendance: 25,000; Referee: Nicolás Gallo

7 August 7	Atlético Nacional	1–0	Once Caldas	Medellín
20:00	Berrío 22'	Report		Stadium: Estadio Atanasio Girardot; Attendance: 23,227; Referee: Cristian Villarraga

14 August 8	Boyacá Chicó	1–1	Atlético Nacional	Tunja
19:30	Rentería 83'	Report	Quiñones 66'	Stadium: Estadio La Independencia; Attendance: 4,500; Referee: Luis Sánchez

20 August 9	Atlético Nacional	1–0	Millonarios	Medellín
18:00	Torres 41'	Report		Stadium: Estadio Atanasio Girardot; Attendance: 35,692; Referee: Juan Pontón

28 August 10	Atlético Nacional	1–0	Independiente Medellín	Medellín
17:00	Torres 74'	Report		Stadium: Estadio Atanasio Girardot; Attendance: 41,487; Referee: Wilson Lamouroux

10 September 11	Atlético Bucaramanga	2–2	Atlético Nacional	Bucaramanga
15:15	Pérez 43'; N. Palacios 55'	Report	Rodríguez 32'; Ibargüen 40'	Stadium: Estadio Alfonso López; Referee: Luis Sánchez

17 September 13	Envigado	0–0	Atlético Nacional	Envigado
19:45		Report		Stadium: Estadio Polideportivo Sur; Referee: Ulises Arrieta

24 September 14	Atlético Nacional	1–1	Cortuluá	Medellín
17:00	Rodríguez 71'	Report	García 66' (o.g.)	Stadium: Estadio Atanasio Girardot; Attendance: 19,893; Referee: Juan Carlos Gamarra

30 September 15	La Equidad	1–3	Atlético Nacional	Bogotá
20:00	Blanco 30'	Report	Borja 3'; Bocanegra 44', 63'	Stadium: Estadio Metropolitano de Techo; Attendance: 5,180; Referee: Hervin Otero

8 October 3^{†}	Rionegro Águilas	1–1	Atlético Nacional	Rionegro
19:30	Amaya 16'	Report	Rodríguez 8'	Stadium: Estadio Alberto Grisales; Attendance: 9,500; Referee: Harold Perilla

17 October 16	Atlético Nacional	4–0	Atlético Huila	Medellín
19:45	Dajome 10', 59'; Blanco 69'; Quiñones 85'	Report		Stadium: Estadio Atanasio Girardot; Attendance: 18,319; Referee: Éder Vergara

22 October 17	Independiente Medellín	2–2	Atlético Nacional	Medellín
20:00	Caicedo 33'; Marrugo 90+1' (pen.)	Report	Rescaldani 50' (pen.); Nieto 60'	Stadium: Estadio Atanasio Girardot; Attendance: 34,349; Referee: Wilmar Roldán

30 October 18	Atlético Nacional	2–1	Patriotas	Medellín
17:00	Moya 10'; Dajome 70'	Report	Rendón 39'	Stadium: Estadio Atanasio Girardot; Attendance: 37,345; Referee: Ulises Arrieta

6 November 19	Santa Fe	0–0	Atlético Nacional	Bogotá
16:30		Report		Stadium: Estadio El Campín; Attendance: 6,000; Referee: Wilson Lamouroux

9 November 12^{†}	Atlético Nacional	2–2	Junior	Medellín
19:00	Uribe 55'; Henríquez 86'	Report	Rangel 13'; Vélez 15'	Stadium: Estadio Atanasio Girardot; Referee: Carlos Herrera

19 November 20	Atlético Nacional	3–1	Deportivo Pasto	Itagüí
17:45	Rodríguez 32' (pen.), 87' (pen.); Ramírez 50'	Report	Arango 35'	Stadium: Estadio Metropolitano Ciudad de Itagüí; Referee: Edilson Ariza

†: Matches postponed due to participation in the Copa Libertadores and Copa Sudamericana.

Knockout phase

===== Quarterfinals =====
27 November First leg	Millonarios	2–1	Atlético Nacional	Bogotá
18:00	del Valle 68'; Silva 74'	Report	Quiñones 15'	Stadium: Estadio El Campín; Attendance: 33,843; Referee: Luis Sánchez

3 December Second leg	Atlético Nacional	3–0	Millonarios	Medellín
19:30	Guerra 41'; Díaz 89'; Nieto 90+2'	Report		Stadium: Estadio Atanasio Girardot; Attendance: 40,492; Referee: Nicolás Gallo

===== Semifinals =====
7 December First leg	Santa Fe	1–1	Atlético Nacional	Bogotá
19:00	Gómez 55'	Report	Bernal 36'	Stadium: Estadio El Campín; Referee: Carlos Betancourt

11 December Second leg	Atlético Nacional	0–4	Santa Fe	Medellín
19:00		Report	Moya 6'; Osorio 18'; Tesillo 47'; Plata 71'	Stadium: Estadio Atanasio Girardot; Referee: Juan Pontón

=== Copa Libertadores ===
==== Second stage ====
Pos	Team	Pld	W	D	L	GF	GA	GD	Pts	Qualification
1	(Colombia) Atlético Nacional (A)	6	5	1	0	12	0	+12	16	Final stages
2	(Argentina) Huracán (A)	6	2	2	2	7	7	0	8	Final stages
3	(Uruguay) Peñarol	6	1	2	3	5	11	−6	5	
4	(Peru) Sporting Cristal	6	1	1	4	9	15	−6	4	

Source: CONMEBOL
Rules for classification: 1) points; 2) goal difference; 3) goals scored; 4) away goals scored; 5) drawing of lots.
(A) Advanced to the round of 16

Match won	Match drawn	Match lost

23 February 1	Huracán (Argentina)	0–2	(Colombia) Atlético Nacional	Buenos Aires
21:45 UTC−3		Report	Moreno 44'; Berrío 81'	Stadium: Estadio Tomás Adolfo Ducó; Attendance: 12,000; Referee: Roberto Tobar (Chile)

1 March 2	Atlético Nacional (Colombia)	3–0	(Peru) Sporting Cristal	Medellín
19:45 UTC−5	Sánchez 11'; Copete 32'; Moreno 73'	Report		Stadium: Estadio Atanasio Girardot; Attendance: 44,109; Referee: Oscar Maldonado (Bolivia)

8 March 3	Atlético Nacional (Colombia)	2–0	(Uruguay) Peñarol	Medellín
19:45 UTC−5	Bocanegra 54'; Moreno 60'	Report		Stadium: Estadio Atanasio Girardot; Attendance: 43,198; Referee: Héber Lopes (Brazil)

15 March 4	Peñarol (Uruguay)	0–4	(Colombia) Atlético Nacional	Montevideo
21:45 UTC−3		Report	Copete 8'; Bocanegra 45'; Berrío 81'; L. Ruiz 84'	Stadium: Estadio Centenario; Referee: Julio Bascuñán (Chile)

12 April 5	Sporting Cristal (Peru)	0–1	(Colombia) Atlético Nacional	Lima
21:45 UTC−5		Report	Ibarbo 13' (pen.)	Stadium: Estadio Alberto Gallardo; Referee: Juan Soto (Venezuela)

19 April 6	Atlético Nacional (Colombia)	0–0	(Argentina) Huracán	Medellín
17:30 UTC−5		Report		Stadium: Estadio Atanasio Girardot; Attendance: 35,018; Referee: Enrique Osses (Chile

==== Final stages ====
===== Round of 16 =====
26 April First leg	Huracán (Argentina)	0–0	(Colombia) Atlético Nacional	Buenos Aires
19:30 UTC−3		Report		Stadium: Estadio Tomás Adolfo Ducó; Referee: Patricio Polic (Chile)

3 May Second leg	Atlético Nacional (Colombia)	4–2	(Argentina) Huracán	Medellín
19:45 UTC−5	Ibarbo 24' (pen.); Guerra 58', 68'; Copete 90+3'	Report	Espinoza 26'; Ábila 77'	Stadium: Estadio Atanasio Girardot; Attendance: 44,169; Referee: José Argote (Venezuela)

===== Quarterfinals =====
12 May First leg	Rosario Central (Argentina)	1–0	(Colombia) Atlético Nacional	Rosario
19:45 UTC−3	Montoya 5'	Report		Stadium: Estadio Gigante de Arroyito; Referee: Sandro Ricci (Brazil)

19 May Second leg	Atlético Nacional (Colombia)	3–1	(Argentina) Rosario Central	Medellín
19:45 UTC−5	Torres 45+2'; Guerra 50'; Berrío 90+5'	Report	Ruben 8' (pen.)	Stadium: Estadio Atanasio Girardot; Attendance: 44,591; Referee: Daniel Fedorczuk (Uruguay)

===== Semifinals =====
6 July First leg	São Paulo (Brazil)	0–2	(Colombia) Atlético Nacional	São Paulo
21:45 UTC−3		Report	Borja 81', 87'	Stadium: Estádio do Morumbi; Attendance: 67,052; Referee: Mauro Vigliano (Argentina)

13 July Second leg	Atlético Nacional (Colombia)	2–1	(Brazil) São Paulo	Medellín
19:45 UTC−5	Borja 15', 77' (pen.)	Report	Calleri 8'	Stadium: Estadio Atanasio Girardot; Attendance: 44,739; Referee: Patricio Polic (Chile)

===== Finals =====
20 July First leg	Independiente del Valle (Ecuador)	1–1	(Colombia) Atlético Nacional	Quito
19:45 UTC−5	Mina 86'	Report	Berrío 35'	Stadium: Estadio Olímpico Atahualpa; Attendance: 38,500; Referee: Enrique Cáceres (Paraguay)

27 July Second leg	Atlético Nacional (Colombia)	1–0	(Ecuador) Independiente del Valle	Medellín
19:45 UTC−5	Borja 8'	Report		Stadium: Estadio Atanasio Girardot; Attendance: 46,000; Referee: Néstor Pitana (Argentina)

=== Copa Sudamericana ===
Atlético Nacional qualified as champion of the 2016 Superliga Colombiana.

==== Elimination stages ====
===== First stage =====
11 August First leg	Deportivo Municipal (Peru)	0–5	(Colombia) Atlético Nacional	Lima
21:00 UTC−5		Report	Uribe 29'; Arias 58'; Berrío 65'; Bernal 76'; Miller 88'	Stadium: Estadio Alejandro Villanueva; Referee: Mario Díaz de Vivar (Paraguay)

17 August Second leg	Atlético Nacional (Colombia)	1–0	(Peru) Deportivo Municipal	Medellín
21:15 UTC−5	Bernal 42'	Report		Stadium: Estadio Atanasio Girardot; Attendance: 18,716; Referee: Juan Carlos Albarracín (Ecuador)

===== Second stage =====
24 August First leg	Club Bolívar (Bolivia)	1–1	(Colombia) Atlético Nacional	La Paz
18:15 UTC−4	Arce 55'	Report	Borja 69'	Stadium: Estadio Hernando Siles; Referee: Enrique Cáceres (Paraguay)

13 September Second leg	Atlético Nacional (Colombia)	1–0	(Bolivia) Club Bolívar	Medellín
19:45 UTC−5	Borja 60'	Report		Stadium: Estadio Atanasio Girardot; Attendance: 20,092; Referee: Roddy Zambrano (Ecuador)

==== Final stages ====
===== Round of 16 =====
20 September First leg	Sol de América (Paraguay)	1–1	(Colombia) Atlético Nacional	Asunción
19:45 UTC−4	Velázquez Ramos 88'	Report	Mosquera 13'	Stadium: Estadio Luis Alfonso Giagni; Referee: Juan Soto (Venezuela)

27 September Second leg	Atlético Nacional (Colombia)	2–0	(Paraguay) Sol de América	Medellín
19:45 UTC−5	Bocanegra 57'; Berrío 82'	Report		Stadium: Estadio Atanasio Girardot; Referee: Christian Ferreyra (Uruguay)

===== Quarterfinals =====
19 October First leg	Coritiba (Brazil)	1–1	(Colombia) Atlético Nacional	Curitiba
21:45 UTC−2	Iago 85'	Report	Borja 13'	Stadium: Estádio Couto Pereira; Referee: Roberto Tobar (Chile)

26 October Second leg	Atlético Nacional (Colombia)	3–1	(Brazil) Coritiba	Medellín
18:45 UTC−5	Borja 51', 59', 72' (pen.)	Report	C. González 43'	Stadium: Estadio Atanasio Girardot; Referee: Victor Carrillo (Peru)

===== Semifinals =====
1 November First leg	Cerro Porteño (Paraguay)	1–1	(Colombia) Atlético Nacional	Asunción
20:45 UTC−3	Domínguez 45+4' (pen.)	Report	Pereira 82' (o.g.)	Stadium: Estadio Defensores del Chaco; Referee: Néstor Pitana (Argentina)

24 November Second leg	Atlético Nacional (Colombia)	0–0	(Paraguay) Cerro Porteño	Medellín
19:45 UTC−5		Report		Stadium: Estadio Atanasio Girardot; Referee: Julio Bascuñán (Chile)

===== Finals =====
30 November First leg	Atlético Nacional (Colombia)	Cancelled	(Brazil) Chapecoense	Medellín
18:45 UTC−5				Stadium: Estadio Atanasio Girardot

7 December Second leg	Chapecoense (Brazil)	Cancelled	(Colombia) Atlético Nacional	Curitiba
				Stadium: Estádio Couto Pereira

- Copa Sudamericana finals cancelled because of LaMia Airlines Flight 2933 accident involving Chapecoense. On December 5, CONMEBOL awarded Chapecoense the title of the tournament, while Atlético Nacional received the "CONMEBOL Centenario Fair Play" award.

=== Copa Colombia ===
Atlético Nacional qualified for the round of 16 after qualify to the 2016 Copa Libertadores.

==== Round of 16 ====
3 August First leg	Atlético Nacional	1–2	Real Cartagena	Medellín
15:00	Quiñones 33'	Report	Arzuaga 75'; Salcedo 90+3'	Stadium: Estadio Atanasio Girardot; Referee: Lisandro Castillo

18 August Second leg	Real Cartagena	0–2	Atlético Nacional	Cartagena
19:45		Report	Berrío 40'; Borja 57'	Stadium: Estadio Jaime Morón León; Referee: Luis Trujillo

==== Quarterfinals ====
1 September First leg	Atlético Nacional	3–0	Patriotas	Medellín
19:10	Bocanegra 5'; Borja 8', 66'	Report		Stadium: Estadio Atanasio Girardot; Attendance: 10,723; Referee: Jorge Gúzman

7 September Second leg	Patriotas	2–1	Atlético Nacional	Tunja
20:00	Gómez 47'; Vásquez 82'	Report	Nieto 65'	Stadium: Estadio La Independencia; Referee: Bismar Santiago

==== Semifinals ====
5 October First leg	Atlético Nacional	1–1	Santa Fe	Medellín
19:00	Rodríguez 63'	Report	Gómez 45' (pen.)	Stadium: Estadio Atanasio Girardot; Referee: Juan Pontón

12 October Second leg	Santa Fe	1–4	Atlético Nacional	Bogotá
19:45	Tesillo 70'	Report	Borja 3', 79'; Bocanegra 31'; Berrío 72'	Stadium: Estadio Metropolitano de Techo; Referee: Nicolás Gallo

==== Final ====
13 November First leg	Atlético Nacional	2–1	Junior	Medellín
19:00	Rescaldani 45+3'; Nieto 49'	Report	Narváez 15'	Stadium: Estadio Atanasio Girardot; Attendance: 33,894; Referee: Nicolás Gallo

17 November Second leg	Junior	0–1	Atlético Nacional	Barranquilla
19:10		Report	Ibargüen 31'	Stadium: Estadio Metropolitano Roberto Meléndez; Attendance: 20,505; Referee: Luis Sánchez

=== FIFA Club World Cup ===
Atlético Nacional secured their spot by winning the 2016 Copa Libertadores.

14 December Semifinals	Atlético Nacional (Colombia)	0–3	(Japan) Kashima Antlers	Osaka, Japan
19:30 UTC+9		Report	Doi 33' (pen.); Endo 83'; Suzuki 85'	Stadium: Suita City Football Stadium; Attendance: 15,050; Referee: Viktor Kassai (Hungary)

18 December Third-place match	Club América (Mexico)	2–2 (3–4 p)	(Colombia) Atlético Nacional	Yokohama, Japan
16:00 UTC+9	Arroyo 38'; Peralta 66' (pen.)	Report	Samudio 6' (o.g.); Guerra 26'	Stadium: International Stadium Yokohama; Attendance: 44,625; Referee: Nawaf Shukralla (Bahrain)
	Penalties
	Martínez (penalty missed); Samudio (penalty missed); Quintero (penalty scored); Peralta (penalty scored); Arroyo (penalty scored)		(penalty scored) Mosquera; (penalty missed) Nieto; (penalty scored) Bocanegra; (penalty scored) Torres; (penalty scored) Borja

== Statistics ==
=== Squad statistics ===
No.	Pos.	Nat.	Player	LA	LG	CA	CG	IA	IG	TA	TG	PM	Yellow card	Red card	Updated
1	GK	(Colombia)	Cristian Bonilla	16	0	3	0	0	0	19	0	1,710	7	0	21 December 2016
25	GK	(Colombia)	Christian Vargas	6	0	0	0	0	0	6	0	540	2	0	21 December 2016
34	GK	(Argentina)	Franco Armani	20	0	6	0	26	0	52	0	4,680	7	0	21 December 2016
35	GK	(Colombia)	Luis Martínez	5	0	1	0	0	0	6	0	540	0	0	21 December 2016
	GK	(Colombia)	Juan David Ramírez	1	0	0	0	0	0	1	0	90	0	0	21 December 2016
2	DF	(Colombia)	Daniel Bocanegra	19	7	6	2	22	3	47	12	3,830	8	1	21 December 2016
3	DF	(Colombia)	Felipe Aguilar	15	0	2	0	14	0	31	0	2,417	7	0	21 December 2016
4	DF	(Panama)	Roderick Miller	10	0	3	0	3	1	16	1	1,120	4	1	21 December 2016
5	DF	(Colombia)	Francisco Nájera	26	0	8	0	7	0	41	0	3,352	12	2	21 December 2016
12	DF	(Colombia)	Alexis Henríquez	20	1	5	0	21	0	46	1	4,016	15	1	21 December 2016
17	DF	(Colombia)	Rodin Quiñónes	27	4	3	1	1	0	31	5	1,380	1	0	21 December 2016
19	DF	(Colombia)	Farid Díaz	9	1	3	0	26	0	38	1	3,401	6	0	21 December 2016
20	DF	(Colombia)	Alejandro Bernal	14	2	2	0	3	2	19	4	1,087	2	0	21 December 2016
22	DF	(Colombia)	Gilberto García	28	0	3	0	2	0	33	0	2,507	7	0	21 December 2016
23	DF	(Colombia)	Edwin Velasco	13	1	6	0	0	0	19	1	1,536	5	0	21 December 2016
24	DF	(Colombia)	Albin Domínguez	4	0	0	0	0	0	4	0	187	0	0	21 December 2016
27	DF	(Colombia)	Carlos Cuesta	15	0	0	0	1	0	16	0	1,165	1	0	21 December 2016
30	DF	(Colombia)	Franky Uribe	2	0	0	0	0	0	2	0	105	0	0	21 December 2016
32	DF	(Colombia)	Tomás Maya	17	0	1	0	0	0	18	0	1,333	2	0	21 December 2016
6	MF	(Colombia)	Mateus Uribe	11	1	8	0	9	1	28	2	2,218	5	2	21 December 2016
8	MF	(Colombia)	Diego Arias	22	1	10	0	18	1	50	2	3,620	6	0	21 December 2016
10	MF	(Colombia)	Macnelly Torres	21	9	2	0	22	1	45	10	3,410	7	0	21 December 2016
13	MF	(Colombia)	Cristian Moya	3	1	0	0	0	0	3	1	192	0	0	21 December 2016
14	MF	(Colombia)	Elkin Blanco	18	1	4	0	8	0	30	1	1,759	7	0	21 December 2016
15	MF	(Colombia)	Juan Pablo Nieto	25	3	7	2	3	0	35	5	2,096	9	1	21 December 2016
15	MF	(Colombia)	Andrés Córdoba	1	0	0	0	0	0	1	0	0	0	0	21 December 2016
15	MF	(Colombia)	David Pérez	2	0	0	0	0	0	2	0	25	1	0	21 December 2016
18	MF	(Venezuela)	Alejandro Guerra	10	6	4	0	22	4	36	10	2,274	9	0	21 December 2016
21	MF	(Colombia)	Jhon Mosquera	8	0	6	0	11	1	25	1	1,700	3	1	21 December 2016
27	MF	(Colombia)	Juan Pablo Ramírez	10	2	0	0	0	0	10	2	553	1	0	21 December 2016
31	MF	(Colombia)	Dayron Mosquera	12	0	0	0	0	0	12	0	409	0	0	21 December 2016
7	FW	(Argentina)	Ezequiel Rescaldani	14	3	5	1	6	0	25	4	1,428	4	0	21 December 2016
9	FW	(Colombia)	Miguel Borja	7	1	6	5	14	11	27	17	1,985	7	1	21 December 2016
11	FW	(Colombia)	Andrés Ibargüen	33	9	4	1	16	0	53	10	3,549	5	0	21 December 2016
16	FW	(Colombia)	Cristián Dajome	17	3	4	0	2	0	23	3	1,226	3	0	21 December 2016
28	FW	(Colombia)	Orlando Berrío	25	9	5	2	24	6	54	17	3,911	11	2	21 December 2016
29	FW	(Colombia)	Andrés Sarmiento	3	0	0	0	0	0	3	0	93	0	0	21 December 2016
29	FW	(Colombia)	Hadier Borja	2	0	0	0	0	0	2	0	90	0	0	21 December 2016
30	FW	(Colombia)	Arley Rodríguez	25	7	7	1	6	0	38	8	1,958	11	0	21 December 2016
33	FW	(Colombia)	Sebastián Támara	10	0	1	0	0	0	11	0	357	1	0	21 December 2016
	DF	(Colombia)	Daniel Londoño	11	0	0	0	0	0	11	0	897	5	0	21 December 2016
	DF	(Colombia)	Diego Peralta	4	0	0	0	0	0	4	0	322	0	0	21 December 2016
	DF	(Colombia)	Davinson Sánchez	14	0	2	0	14	1	30	1	2,663	7	0	21 December 2016
	DF	(Colombia)	Marlon Torres	0	0	1	1	0	0	1	1	71	0	0	21 December 2016
	MF	(Colombia)	Sherman Cárdenas	14	1	0	0	2	0	16	1	712	5	0	21 December 2016
	MF	(Colombia)	Alexander Mejía	17	0	1	0	12	0	30	0	2,589	11	0	21 December 2016
	MF	(Colombia)	Sebastián Pérez Cardona	6	0	2	1	12	0	20	1	1,468	5	0	21 December 2016
	FW	(Colombia)	Juan David Castañeda	8	1	0	0	1	0	9	1	360	0	0	21 December 2016
	FW	(Colombia)	Jonathan Copete	11	3	2	2	8	3	21	8	1,555	1	0	21 December 2016
	FW	(Colombia)	Jefferson Duque	0	0	1	0	0	0	1	0	20	0	0	21 December 2016
	FW	(Colombia)	Víctor Ibarbo	11	1	0	0	8	2	19	3	1,235	4	1	21 December 2016
	FW	(Colombia)	Marlos Moreno	9	0	1	0	13	3	23	3	1,629	3	0	21 December 2016
	FW	(Colombia)	Brayan Rovira	4	0	0	0	0	0	4	0	248	1	1	21 December 2016
	FW	(Colombia)	Luis Carlos Ruiz	9	3	2	1	6	1	17	5	917	1	0	21 December 2016

International cup: Copa Libertadores, Copa Sudamericana, FIFA Club World Cup
Source: Soccerway

=== Goals ===
R	Pos	Player	App	G	Pen	Avg	Updated
1st	FW	(Colombia) Miguel Borja	27	17	2	0.63	21 December 2016
1st	FW	(Colombia) Orlando Berrío	54	17	0	0.31	21 December 2016
3rd	DF	(Colombia) Daniel Bocanegra	47	12	0	0.26	21 December 2016
4th	MF	(Venezuela) Alejandro Guerra	36	10	0	0.28	21 December 2016
4th	MF	(Colombia) Macnelly Torres	45	10	0	0.22	21 December 2016
4th	FW	(Colombia) Andrés Ibargüen	53	10	0	0.19	21 December 2016
7th	FW	(Colombia) Jonathan Copete	21	8	0	0.38	21 December 2016
7th	FW	(Colombia) Arley Rodríguez	38	8	2	0.21	21 December 2016
9th	FW	(Colombia) Luis Carlos Ruiz	17	5	1	0.29	21 December 2016
9th	DF	(Colombia) Rodin Quiñónes	31	5	0	0.16	21 December 2016
9th	MF	(Colombia) Juan Pablo Nieto	35	5	0	0.14	21 December 2016
12th	DF	(Colombia) Alejandro Bernal	19	4	1	0.21	21 December 2016
12th	FW	(Argentina) Ezequiel Rescaldani	25	4	1	0.16	21 December 2016
14th	FW	(Colombia) Víctor Ibarbo	19	3	2	0.16	21 December 2016
14th	MF	(Colombia) Cristián Dajome	23	3	0	0.13	21 December 2016
14th	FW	(Colombia) Marlos Moreno	23	3	0	0.13	21 December 2016
17th	FW	(Colombia) Juan Pablo Ramírez	10	2	0	0.2	21 December 2016
17th	MF	(Colombia) Mateus Uribe	28	2	1	0.07	21 December 2016
17th	MF	(Colombia) Diego Arias	50	2	0	0.04	21 December 2016
20th	DF	(Colombia) Marlon Torres	1	1	0	1	21 December 2016
20th	MF	(Colombia) Cristian Moya	3	1	0	0.33	21 December 2016
20th	FW	(Colombia) Juan David Castañeda	9	1	0	0.11	21 December 2016
20th	DF	(Panama) Roderick Miller	16	1	0	0.06	21 December 2016
20th	MF	(Colombia) Sherman Cárdenas	16	1	0	0.06	21 December 2016
20th	DF	(Colombia) Edwin Velasco	19	1	0	0.05	21 December 2016
20th	MF	(Colombia) Sebastián Pérez Cardona	20	1	0	0.05	21 December 2016
20th	MF	(Colombia) Jhon Mosquera	25	1	0	0.04	21 December 2016
20th	MF	(Colombia) Elkin Blanco	30	1	0	0.03	21 December 2016
20th	DF	(Colombia) Davinson Sánchez	30	1	0	0.03	21 December 2016
20th	DF	(Colombia) Farid Díaz	38	1	0	0.03	21 December 2016
20th	DF	(Colombia) Alexis Henríquez	46	1	0	0.02	21 December 2016

Source: Soccerway

=== Disciplinary record ===
N	Pos.	Nat.	Name	Yellow card	Second yellow card	Red card	Notes
12	DF	(Colombia)	Alexis Henríquez	15	1	0	
5	DF	(Colombia)	Francisco Nájera	12	2	0	
28	FW	(Colombia)	Orlando Berrío	11	0	2	
13	MF	(Colombia)	Alexander Mejía	11	0	0	
30	FW	(Colombia)	Arley Rodríguez	11	0	0	
15	MF	(Colombia)	Juan Pablo Nieto	9	0	1	
2	DF	(Colombia)	Daniel Bocanegra	8	1	0	
18	MF	(Venezuela)	Alejandro Guerra	9	0	0	
6	MF	(Colombia)	Mateus Uribe	5	0	2	
9	FW	(Colombia)	Miguel Borja	7	0	1	
1	GK	(Colombia)	Cristian Bonilla	7	0	0	
3	DF	(Colombia)	Felipe Aguilar	7	0	0	
10	MF	(Colombia)	Macnelly Torres	7	0	0	
14	MF	(Colombia)	Elkin Blanco	7	0	0	
22	DF	(Colombia)	Gilberto García	7	0	0	
34	GK	(Argentina)	Franco Armani	7	0	0	
	DF	(Colombia)	Davinson Sánchez	7	0	0	
8	MF	(Colombia)	Diego Arias	6	0	0	
19	DF	(Colombia)	Farid Díaz	6	0	0	
4	DF	(Panama)	Roderick Miller	4	1	0	
	FW	(Colombia)	Víctor Ibarbo	4	1	0	
11	FW	(Colombia)	Andrés Ibargüen	5	0	0	
23	DF	(Colombia)	Edwin Velasco	5	0	0	
	DF	(Colombia)	Daniel Londoño	5	0	0	
	MF	(Colombia)	Sherman Cárdenas	5	0	0	
	MF	(Colombia)	Sebastián Pérez Cardona	5	0	0	
7	FW	(Argentina)	Ezequiel Rescaldani	4	0	0	
21	MF	(Colombia)	Jhon Mosquera	3	1	0	
16	FW	(Colombia)	Cristián Dajome	3	0	0	
	FW	(Colombia)	Marlos Moreno	3	0	0	
	FW	(Colombia)	Brayan Rovira	1	1	0	
20	MF	(Colombia)	Alejandro Bernal	2	0	0	
25	GK	(Colombia)	Christian Vargas	2	0	0	
32	DF	(Colombia)	Tomás Maya	2	0	0	
3	MF	(Colombia)	David Pérez	1	0	0	
17	DF	(Colombia)	Rodin Quiñones	1	0	0	
27	DF	(Colombia)	Carlos Cuesta	1	0	0	
27	MF	(Colombia)	Juan Pablo Ramírez	1	0	0	
33	FW	(Colombia)	Sebastián Támara	1	0	0	
	FW	(Colombia)	Jonathan Copete	1	0	0	
	FW	(Colombia)	Luis Carlos Ruiz	1	0	0	

Last updated: 21 December 2016
Source: Soccerway
Only competitive matches
(yellow card) = Number of bookings; (second yellow card) = Number of sending offs after a second yellow card; (red card) = Number of sending offs by a direct red card.
