= 2017 Recopa Sudamericana =

South American football competition

CONMEBOL Recopa 2017
Chapecoense	Atlético Nacional
(Brazil)	(Colombia)
3	5
- on aggregate

First leg
Chapecoense	Atlético Nacional
2	1
- Date: 4 April 2017
- Venue: Arena Condá, Chapecó
- Referee: Mario Díaz de Vivar (Paraguay)
- Attendance: 19,005

Second leg
Atlético Nacional	Chapecoense
4	1
- Date: 10 May 2017
- Venue: Estadio Atanasio Girardot, Medellín
- Referee: Roberto Tobar (Chile)
- Attendance: 40,450

The 2017 CONMEBOL Recopa was the 25th edition of the CONMEBOL Recopa (also referred to as the Recopa Sudamericana, or Portuguese: Recopa Sul-Americana), the football competition organized by CONMEBOL between the winners of the previous season's two major South American club tournaments, the Copa Libertadores and the Copa Sudamericana.

The competition was contested in two-legged home-and-away format between Colombian team Atlético Nacional, the 2016 Copa Libertadores champions, and Brazilian team Chapecoense, the 2016 Copa Sudamericana champions. The first leg was hosted by Chapecoense at Arena Condá in Chapecó on 4 April 2017, while the second leg was hosted by Atlético Nacional at Estadio Atanasio Girardot in Medellín on 10 May 2017.

Atlético Nacional defeated Chapecoense 5–3 on aggregate to win their first Recopa Sudamericana title.

== Background ==
The matches took place during the year after the crash of LaMia Flight 2933, in which 19 Chapecoense players and the club's coach died while travelling to compete in the first leg of the 2016 Copa Sudamericana Final, which was to have taken place at Atlético Nacional's Estadio Atanasio Girardot in Medellín. Following the crash, CONMEBOL awarded the 2016 Copa Sudamericana to Chapecoense, at the request of Atlético Nacional. The tragedy has produced a friendship between the two clubs: on the scheduled night of the original match, Atlético Nacional held a memorial for the victims attended by over 130,000 people including the mayor of Chapecó, an act that Chapecoense fans offered thanks for in their own club's memorial gathering.

== Format ==
The Recopa Sudamericana was played on a home-and-away two-legged basis, with the Copa Libertadores champions hosting the second leg. If tied on aggregate, the away goals rule would not be used, and 30 minutes of extra time would be played. If still tied after extra time, the penalty shoot-out would be used to determine the winner.

== Teams ==
Team	Qualification	Previous app.
(Colombia) Atlético Nacional	2016 Copa Libertadores champions	1 (1990)
(Brazil) Chapecoense	2016 Copa Sudamericana champions	None

Bold indicates winning years

== Venues ==
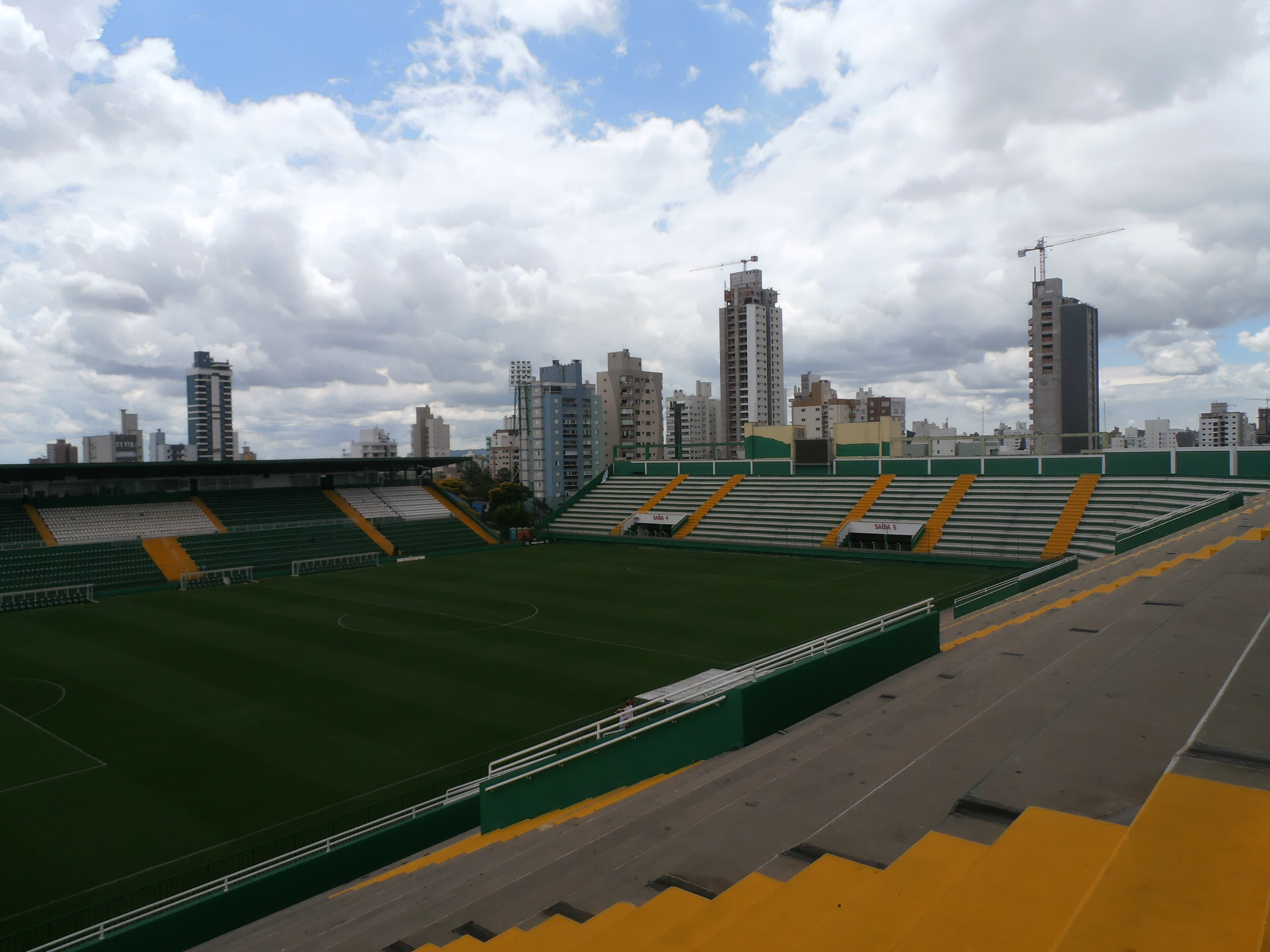
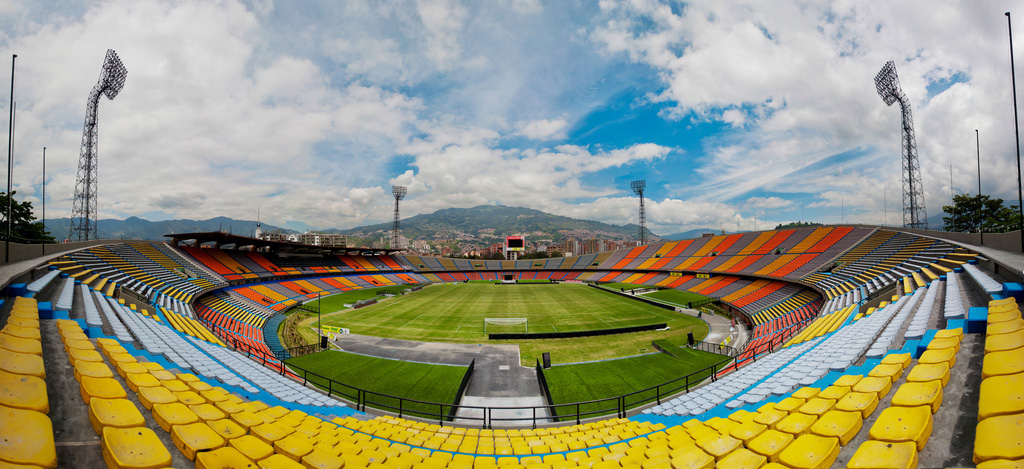
Arena Condá in Chapecó (left) and Estadio Atanasio Girardot in Medellín, venues for the series

== Matches ==
=== First leg ===
4 April 2017
19:15 UTC−3
First leg

Chapecoense (Brazil)	2–1	(Colombia) Atlético Nacional
Reinaldo 23' (pen.); Luiz Otávio 73'	Report	Torres 58'

Arena Condá, Chapecó
Attendance: 19,005
Referee: Mario Díaz de Vivar (Paraguay)

**Chapecoense**	**Atlético Nacional**

GK	1	(Brazil) Artur Moraes (c)
RB	22	(Brazil) Apodi	(yellow card) 76'
CB	3	(Brazil) Douglas Grolli		(substituted off) 46'
CB	4	(Brazil) Nathan
LB	6	(Brazil) Reinaldo
RM	2	(Brazil) João Pedro
CM	18	(Brazil) Luiz Antônio		(substituted off) 65'
LM	8	(Brazil) Andrei Girotto
RW	7	(Brazil) Rossi
CF	10	(Brazil) Túlio de Melo		(substituted off) 72'
LW	17	(Brazil) Arthur
Substitutes:
GK	12	(Brazil) Elias
DF	16	(Brazil) Diego Renan
DF	21	(Brazil) Luiz Otávio		(substituted on) 46'
MF	5	(Brazil) Moisés Ribeiro		(substituted on) 65'
MF	19	(Brazil) Osman Júnior
FW	9	(Brazil) Wellington Paulista		(substituted on) 72'
FW	11	(Brazil) Niltinho
Manager:
(Brazil) Vágner Mancini

GK	25	(Argentina) Franco Armani
RB	2	(Colombia) Daniel Bocanegra	(yellow card) 22'
CB	3	(Colombia) Felipe Aguilar
CB	12	(Colombia) Alexis Henríquez (c)	(yellow card) 90'
LB	19	(Colombia) Farid Díaz
RM	8	(Colombia) Diego Arias	(yellow card) 88'
CM	20	(Colombia) Alejandro Bernal		(substituted off) 77'
LM	11	(Colombia) Andrés Ibargüen		(substituted off) 89'
AM	10	(Colombia) Macnelly Torres
RF	9	(Colombia) Luis Carlos Ruiz
LF	17	(Colombia) Dayro Moreno		(substituted off) 71'
Substitutes:
GK	1	(Colombia) Cristian Bonilla
DF	5	(Colombia) Francisco Nájera
MF	14	(Colombia) Elkin Blanco
MF	18	(Colombia) Aldo Leão Ramírez		(substituted on) 71'
MF	21	(Colombia) Jhon Mosquera		(substituted on) 77'
MF	23	(Colombia) Edwin Velasco
FW	7	(Colombia) Arley Rodríguez		(substituted on) 89'
Manager:
(Colombia) Reinaldo Rueda

Assistant referees:
Milcíades Saldívar (Paraguay)
Roberto Cañete (Paraguay)
Fourth official:
José Méndez (Paraguay)

=== Second leg ===
10 May 2017
19:45 UTC−5
Second leg

Atlético Nacional (Colombia)	4–1	(Brazil) Chapecoense
Moreno 1', 66'; Ibargüen 30', 79'	Report	Túlio de Melo 82'

Estadio Atanasio Girardot, Medellín
Attendance: 40,450
Referee: Roberto Tobar (Chile)

**Atlético Nacional**	**Chapecoense**

GK	25	(Argentina) Franco Armani
RB	2	(Colombia) Daniel Bocanegra
CB	5	(Colombia) Francisco Nájera
CB	12	(Colombia) Alexis Henríquez (c)
LB	19	(Colombia) Farid Díaz
CM	8	(Colombia) Diego Arias		(substituted off) 90'
CM	18	(Colombia) Aldo Leão Ramírez		(substituted off) 70'
AM	10	(Colombia) Macnelly Torres
RW	7	(Colombia) Arley Rodríguez	(yellow card) 83'
CF	17	(Colombia) Dayro Moreno
LW	11	(Colombia) Andrés Ibargüen	(yellow card) 55'	(substituted off) 90+2'
Substitutes:
GK	1	(Colombia) Cristian Bonilla
DF	23	(Colombia) Edwin Velasco
MF	14	(Colombia) Elkin Blanco	(yellow card) 84'	(substituted on) 70'
MF	15	(Colombia) Juan Pablo Nieto		(substituted on) 90'
MF	20	(Colombia) Alejandro Bernal
FW	9	(Colombia) Luis Carlos Ruiz
FW	16	(Colombia) Cristian Dájome		(substituted on) 90+2'
Manager:
(Colombia) Reinaldo Rueda

GK	1	(Brazil) Artur Moraes (c)
RB	2	(Brazil) João Pedro
CB	3	(Brazil) Douglas Grolli
CB	4	(Brazil) Nathan	(yellow card) 65'
LB	6	(Brazil) Reinaldo	(yellow card) 28'
RM	8	(Brazil) Andrei Girotto	(yellow card) 56' (red card) 87'
CM	5	(Brazil) Moisés Ribeiro	(yellow card) 45'
LM	18	(Brazil) Luiz Antônio		(substituted off) 46'
RW	19	(Brazil) Osman Júnior
CF	9	(Brazil) Wellington Paulista		(substituted off) 82'
LW	17	(Brazil) Arthur	(yellow card) 23'	(substituted off) 75'
Substitutes:
GK	12	(Brazil) Elias
DF	14	(Brazil) Fabrício Bruno
DF	16	(Brazil) Diego Renan
DF	22	(Brazil) Apodi		(substituted on) 46'
MF	15	(Brazil) Neném
FW	10	(Brazil) Túlio de Melo		(substituted on) 75'
FW	11	(Brazil) Niltinho		(substituted on) 82'
Manager:
(Brazil) Vágner Mancini

Assistant referees:
Marcelo Barraza (Chile)
Claudio Ríos (Chile)
Fourth official:
Jorge Osorio (Chile)

== See also ==
- 2017 Copa Libertadores Finals
- 2017 Copa Sudamericana Finals
