= Football at the 2016 Summer Olympics – Men's qualification (CONMEBOL–CONCACAF play-off) =

CONCACAF–CONMEBOL play-off for the 2016 Summer Olympics
- Event: Football at the 2016 Summer Olympics – Men's qualification
Colombia	United States
(Colombia)	(United States)
3	2

First leg
Colombia	United States
1	1
- Date: 25 March 2016
- Venue: Estadio Metropolitano Roberto Meléndez, Barranquilla
- Referee: Cüneyt Çakır (Turkey)
- Attendance: 10,000

Second leg
United States	Colombia
1	2
- Date: 29 March 2016
- Venue: Toyota Stadium, Frisco
- Referee: Ravshan Irmatov (Uzbekistan)
- Attendance: 7,998

The CONCACAF–CONMEBOL play-off for the 2016 Summer Olympics was a men's under-23 international football play-off between a team from CONCACAF (North, Central America and Caribbean) and a team from CONMEBOL (South America), with the winner qualifying for the final berth in the 2016 Summer Olympics men's football tournament.

Colombia qualified for the Olympics with a 3–2 aggregate win over the United States, after a 1–1 draw in the first leg and a 1–2 win in the second leg.

== Qualified teams ==
- The CONCACAF representative was the United States, who finished third at the 2015 CONCACAF Men's Olympic Qualifying Championship.
- The CONMEBOL representative was Colombia, who finished second at the 2015 South American Youth Football Championship.

== Matches ==
Originally qualification was to be decided using a single-leg tie in Rio de Janeiro, Brazil. However, in October 2015, the International Olympic Committee announced that the play-off would be a home and away series. The first leg was hosted by Colombia, while the second leg was hosted by the United States.

=== First leg ===
25 March 2016
16:05 UTC−5

Colombia	1–1	United States
Quintero 67' (pen.)	Report (CONCACAF); Report (CONMEBOL)	Gil 5'

Estadio Metropolitano Roberto Meléndez, Barranquilla
Attendance: 10,000
Referee: Cüneyt Çakır (Turkey)

GK	1	Cristian Bonilla
DF	13	Helibelton Palacios
DF	5	Davinson Sánchez
DF	3	Yerry Mina
DF	16	Cristian Borja	(yellow card) 90'
MF	14	Wilmar Barrios
MF	6	José David Leudo		(substituted off) 31'
MF	18	Andrés Felipe Roa
MF	10	Juan Fernando Quintero
FW	9	Harold Preciado
FW	7	Andrés Rentería		(substituted off) 61'
Substitutes:
GK	12	Luis Hurtado
DF	2	Jherson Vergara
GK	20	Álvaro Montero
MF	8	Yony González
DF	4	Deiver Machado
MF	11	Jarlan Barrera		(substituted on) 31'
MF	15	Juan Pablo Nieto
FW	19	Rafael Santos Borré		(substituted on) 61'
FW	17	Roger Martínez
Head coach:
(Colombia) Carlos Restrepo

GK	1	Ethan Horvath		(substituted off) 44'
DF	7	Kellyn Acosta	(yellow card) 66'
DF	3	Matt Miazga	(yellow card) 41'
DF	4	Tim Parker
DF	20	Eric Miller
MF	6	Wil Trapp
MF	13	Matt Polster
MF	8	Emerson Hyndman
MF	10	Luis Gil		(substituted off) 65'
FW	18	Mario Rodríguez		(substituted off) 71'
FW	9	Jordan Morris
Substitutes:
GK	2	Tyler Miller
GK	12	Cody Cropper	(yellow card) 82'	(substituted on) 44'
DF	15	Desevio Payne
DF	5	Walker Zimmerman
MF	14	Fatai Alashe		(substituted on) 65'
MF	11	Paul Arriola
MF	17	Jerome Kiesewetter		(substituted on) 71'
MF	16	Julian Green
FW	19	Khiry Shelton
Head coach:
(Austria) Andreas Herzog

Match rules

- 90 minutes.
- Nine named substitutes.
- Maximum of three substitutions.

=== Second leg ===
29 March 2016
20:35 UTC−5

United States	1–2	Colombia
Machado 57' (o.g.)	Report (CONCACAF); Report (CONMEBOL)	R. Martínez 30', 64'

Toyota Stadium, Frisco
Attendance: 7,998
Referee: Ravshan Irmatov (Uzbekistan)

GK	1	Ethan Horvath
DF	15	Desevio Payne		(substituted off) 66'
DF	3	Matt Miazga	(red card) 89'
DF	4	Tim Parker	(yellow card) 51'
DF	2	Kellyn Acosta
MF	11	Paul Arriola		(substituted off) 45'
MF	13	Matt Polster	(yellow card) 58'
MF	6	Wil Trapp
MF	8	Emerson Hyndman
FW	16	Mario Rodríguez	(yellow card) 20'
FW	9	Jordan Morris		(substituted off) 60'
Substitutes:
GK	12	Cody Cropper
GK	18	Tyler Miller
DF	5	Walker Zimmerman
DF	20	Eric Miller
MF	10	Luis Gil	(yellow card) 71' (yellow-red card) 76'	(substituted on) 66'
MF	7	Dillon Serna
MF	14	Fatai Alashe
FW	17	Jerome Kiesewetter		(substituted on) 45'
FW	19	Khiry Shelton		(substituted on) 60'
Head coach:
(Austria) Andreas Herzog

GK	1	Cristian Bonilla	(yellow card) 81'
DF	13	Helibelton Palacios
DF	3	Yerry Mina
DF	5	Davinson Sánchez
DF	4	Deiver Machado	(yellow card) 21'
MF	19	Guillermo Celis
MF	14	Wilmar Barrios	(yellow card) 87'
MF	10	Juan Fernando Quintero		(substituted off) 83'
MF	18	Andrés Felipe Roa		(substituted off) 90'
FW	9	Harold Preciado		(substituted off) 45'
FW	17	Roger Martínez
Substitutes:
GK	12	Luis Hurtado
GK	20	Álvaro Montero
DF	2	Jherson Vergara
DF	16	Cristian Borja		(substituted on) 45'
MF	6	José David Leudo
MF	8	Yony González		(substituted on) 90'
MF	11	Jarlan Barrera	(yellow card) 87'	(substituted on) 83'
MF	15	Juan Pablo Nieto
FW	7	Andrés Rentería
Head coach:
(Colombia) Carlos Restrepo

Assistant referees:
Abduxamidullo Rasulov (Uzbekistan)
Jakhongir Saidov (Uzbekistan)
Fourth official:
Ilgiz Tantashev (Uzbekistan)

Match rules

- 90 minutes.
- Away goals are taken into consideration after 90 minutes.
- If away goals are equal, two sets of 15 minutes ("Extra time") are played.
- If goals are scored and the score remains equal after extra time, the away team wins due to the away goals rule.
- If no goals are scored in extra time, the match is decided via a penalty shoot-out.
- Nine named substitutes.
- Maximum of three substitutions.

== Goalscorers ==
There were 5 goals scored in 2 matches, for an average of 2.5 goals per match.

2 goals

- (Colombia) Roger Martínez

1 goal

- (Colombia) Juan Fernando Quintero
- (United States) Luis Gil

1 own goal

- (Colombia) Deiver Machado (against United States)
