= Daniel Bocanegra =

Colombian footballer (born 1987)

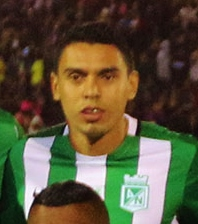
- Bocanegra lining for Atlético Nacional in 2016

Personal information
- Full name: Daniel Eduardo Bocanegra Ortiz
- Date of birth: 23 April 1987 (age 39)
- Place of birth: Purificación, Colombia
- Height: 1.82 m (6 ft 0 in)
- Position: Center-back

Senior career*
Years	Team	Apps	(Gls)
2006–2009	Academia	20	(0)
2009	→ Santa Fe (loan)	0	(0)
2010	→ Atlético Huila (loan)	27	(1)
2011–2012	→ Atlético Huila (loan)	39	(0)
2012–2013	Independiente Medellín	35	(0)
2013–2019	Atlético Nacional	265	(23)
2020–2023	Libertad	103	(4)
2023	Club Nacional	24	(2)
2024–2026	América de Cali	53	(1)

International career^{‡}
2013–2017	Colombia	4	(0)
- * Club domestic league appearances and goals as of 07 September 2026 ‡ National team caps and goals as of 5 September 2017

Daniel Eduardo Bocanegra Ortiz (born 23 April 1987) is a Colombian footballer who plays as a centre-back.

== International ==
On 9 November 2014, Bocanegra received his first call-up to the Colombia national team for friendlies against the United States and Slovenia. He made his debut 18 November 2014, coming on for Santiago Arias in the 65th minute in a 1–0 victory over Slovenia.

After more than a year from his last call-up, Bocanegra was included in manager José Pékerman's list to face Paraguay and Uruguay for the 2018 FIFA World Cup qualifiers on 7 and 11 October 2016, respectively.

== Career statistics ==
=== Club ===
As of match played on 26 November 2016

Appearances and goals by club, season and competition
Club	Season	League			Copa Colombia		Continental^{1}		Other^{2}		Total	
Club	Season	Division	Apps	Goals	Apps	Goals	Apps	Goals	Apps	Goals	Apps	Goals
Atlético; Nacional	2013	Categoría Primera A	13	0	6	0	1	0	0	0	20	0
Atlético; Nacional	2014	Categoría Primera A	25	4	6	0	21	4	2	0	54	8
Atlético; Nacional	2015	Categoría Primera A	16	0	1	0	4	0	2	0	23	0
Atlético; Nacional	2016	Categoría Primera A	18	7	4	2	20	3	2	0	44	12
Career total			72	11	17	2	46	7	6	0	141	20

^{1} Includes cup competitions such as Copa Libertadores and Copa Sudamericana.

^{2} Includes Superliga Colombiana matches.

== Honours ==
=== Club ===
Independiente Santa Fe

- Copa Colombia (1): 2009

Atlético Nacional

- Categoría Primera A (4): 2013-I, 2013-II, 2014-I, 2015-ll
- Copa Colombia (2): 2013, 2016
- Superliga Colombiana (1): 2016
- Copa Libertadores (1): 2016
- Recopa Sudamericana (1): 2017
