= Rodin Quiñones =

Colombian footballer (born 1995)

Personal information
- Full name: Rodin Jair Quiñones Rentería
- Date of birth: 30 May 1995 (age 31)
- Place of birth: Tumaco, Colombia
- Height: 1.82 m (6 ft 0 in)
- Position: Wing-back

Team information
- Current team: Patriotas Boyacá
- Number: 17

Youth career
- Atlético Nacional

Senior career*
| Years | Team | Apps | (Gls) |
| 2013–2017 | Atlético Nacional | 58 | (8) |
| 2018 | Independiente Medellín | 10 | (1) |
| 2019 | Temuco | 10 | (1) |
| 2020– | Patriotas Boyacá | 15 | (0) |

International career^{‡}
| 2014–2015 | Colombia U20 | 5 | (0) |
- * Club domestic league appearances and goals as of 14:14, 10 December 2020 (UTC) ‡ National team caps and goals as of 17:05, 9 March 2020 (UTC)

Rodin Jair Quiñones Rentería (born 30 May 1995) is a Colombian professional footballer who plays as wing-back for Patriotas Boyacá.

== Honours ==
=== Club ===
Atlético Nacional

- Categoría Primera A (4): 2013 Apertura, 2013 Finalización, 2014 Apertura, 2015 Finalización
- Copa Colombia (2): 2013, 2016
- Superliga Colombiana (1): 2016
