= Diego Arias (Colombian footballer) =

Colombian footballer (born 1985)

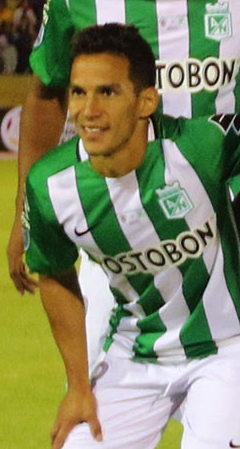
- Arias with Atlético Nacional in 2016

Personal information
- Full name: Diego Alejandro Arias Hincapié
- Date of birth: 15 June 1985 (age 41)
- Place of birth: Pereira, Colombia
- Height: 1.74 m (5 ft 9 in)
- Position: Defensive midfielder

Team information
- Current team: Fortaleza (manager)

Senior career*
Years	Team	Apps	(Gls)
2004–2009	Deportivo Pereira	98	(1)
2009–2011	Once Caldas	46	(3)
2011–2012	PAOK	25	(1)
2012	Cruzeiro	2	(0)
2013–2018	Atlético Nacional	128	(3)
2018	Once Caldas	17	(0)
2019	Independiente Medellín	23	(0)
2020–2021	Atlético Huila	11	(0)

International career
2011	Colombia	1	(0)

Managerial career
- 2023–2024: Atlético Nacional (assistant)
- 2023: Atlético Nacional (interim)
- 2024: Atlético Nacional (interim)
- 2025–2026: Atlético Nacional
- 2026–: Fortaleza
- * Club domestic league appearances and goals

Diego Alejandro Arias Hincapié (born 15 June 1985) is a Colombian football manager and former footballer who played as a defensive midfielder. He is the manager of Colombian club Fortaleza.

== Club career ==
Arias began his footballing career with his hometown club Deportivo Pereira in 2004, moving to rivals Once Caldas five years later. In January 2011, Arias left Colombia and signed a 1.5-year contract with Greek side PAOK, after captaining Once Caldas to the Colombian championship.

After playing abroad for PAOK and Brazilian club Cruzeiro, in 2013 Arias returned to Colombia, being signed by Atlético Nacional per recommendation by manager Juan Carlos Osorio. With Nacional, Arias became a key player for the team's midfield, playing 18 final series and winning 10 titles, including five domestic leagues, two domestic cups, one super cup, as well as the 2016 Copa Libertadores and the 2017 Recopa Sudamericana. Arias left the club in 2018, returning to Once Caldas, and later played for Independiente Medellín and Atlético Huila before retiring in 2021.

== International career ==
On 15 November 2011, Arias made his debut for the senior Colombia national team against Argentina, replacing Jackson Martinez.

== Managerial career ==
After retiring, Arias obtained the CONMEBOL Pro coaching license and started working at Atlético Nacional as a youth coach, being appointed as an assistant to first team manager William Amaral in 2023 and serving as an interim manager for Atlético Nacional for some matches of that year's Copa Libertadores. He was once again an interim for the club in the 2024 league tournament prior to the arrival of Efraín Juárez, and took on the role again the following year as a replacement for Javier Gandolfi, being confirmed as permanent manager shortly later.

With Arias as incumbent manager, Atlético Nacional won the 2025 Copa Colombia and reached the finals of the 2026 Apertura tournament, but he was sacked on 12 June 2026 after losing the league title to Junior. Under his command, Atlético Nacional played 47 matches, with 30 victories, 7 draws and 10 losses, scoring 87 goals and conceding 44 for a 68.7% performance.

On 8 July, Arias was appointed as manager of fellow Liga DIMAYOR side Fortaleza.

== Club performance ==
Club performance		League		Cup		Continental		Other		Total	
Club	Season	Apps	Goals	Apps	Goals	Apps	Goals	Apps	Goals	Apps	Goals
Colombia		Categoría Primera A		Copa Colombia		Continental^{1}		Other^{2}		Total	
2014	30	1	10	0	6	0	1	0	47	15	
2015	18	0	0	0	0	0	2	0	20	10	
2016	21	1	8	0	16	1	2	0	47	10	
Total	94	3	28	0	23	1	5	0	150	4	
Career total		94	3	28	0	23	1	5	0	150	4

Statistics accurate as of last match played on 26 November 2016.

^{1} Includes cup competitions such as Copa Libertadores and Copa Sudamericana.

^{2} Includes Superliga Colombiana matches.

== Honours ==
=== Player ===
Once Caldas

- Categoría Primera A (1): 2010-II

Atlético Nacional

- Categoría Primera A (5): 2013-I, 2013-II, 2014-I, 2015-I, 2017-I
- Copa Colombia (2): 2013, 2016
- Superliga Colombiana (1): 2016
- Copa Libertadores (1): 2016
- Recopa Sudamericana (1): 2017

=== Manager ===
Atlético Nacional

- Copa Colombia (1): 2025
