= Diego Peralta =

Diego Peralta may refer to:

- Diego Peralta (Colombian footballer) (born 1985), Colombian football player
- Diego Peralta (Argentine footballer) (born 1996), Argentine-Italian football player
