= Luis Hurtado =

Luis Hurtado may refer to:

- Luis Hurtado de Mendoza y Pacheco, early modern Spanish nobleman
- Luis Hurtado (actor) (1898–1967), Spanish actor
- Luis Hurtado (Colombian footballer) (born 1994), Colombian footballer
- Luis Hurtado (Spanish footballer) (1892–unknown), Spanish footballer
