= Juan Ramírez =

Juan Ramírez may refer to:

- Juan Ramírez (painter) Spanish painter portrait painter of the 16th century
- Juan Ramírez (footballer, born 1965), Paraguayan football defender
- Juan Andrés Ramírez (1947–2025), Uruguayan politician and lawyer
- Juan Ramirez (footballer, born 1984), Paraguayan football player for Pelita Jaya
- Juan Carlos Ramírez (born 1977), Mexican professional boxer
- Juan de Dios Ramírez Perales (born 1969), Mexican football international
- Juan Diego Ramírez (born 1971), road cyclist from Colombia
- Juan David Ramírez (born 1997), Colombian soccer player for the Austin Bold
- Juan Ramírez (footballer, born 1993), Argentinian football player for Boca Juniors
- Juan Rubelín Ramírez, Dominican Republic freestyle wrestler
