= Alejandro Bernal (footballer, born 1988) =

Colombian footballer (born 1988)

Personal information
- Full name: Alejandro Bernal Ríos
- Date of birth: 3 June 1988 (age 38)
- Place of birth: Montería, Colombia
- Height: 1.83 m (6 ft 0 in)
- Position: Defensive midfielder

Team information
- Current team: Atlético Bucaramanga

Senior career*
Years	Team	Apps	(Gls)
2007	Deportivo Cali		
2008–2011	Santa Fe	73	(7)
2012–2017	Atlético Nacional	133	(7)
2017–2018	América de Cali	32	(3)
2019	Atlético Bucaramanga	18	(0)

International career
2007	Colombia U-20	7	(0)
- * Club domestic league appearances and goals

Alejandro Bernal Ríos (born 3 June 1988) is a Colombian retired footballer who last played for Atlético Bucaramanga. He usually plays as a defensive midfielder.

He is most recognized for his time at Atletico Nacional, where he won 12 titles in 5 years. He ended his career in 2019 at Atlético Bucaramanga.

== Honours ==
=== Club ===
Independiente Santa Fe

- Copa Colombia (1): 2009

Atlético Nacional

- Categoría Primera A (5): 2013-I, 2013-II, 2014-I, 2015-II, 2017-I
- Copa Colombia (3): 2012, 2013, 2016
- Superliga Colombiana (2): 2012, 2016
- Copa Libertadores: 2016
- Recopa Sudamericana: 2017
