= Gilberto García (footballer, born 1987) =

Colombian footballer

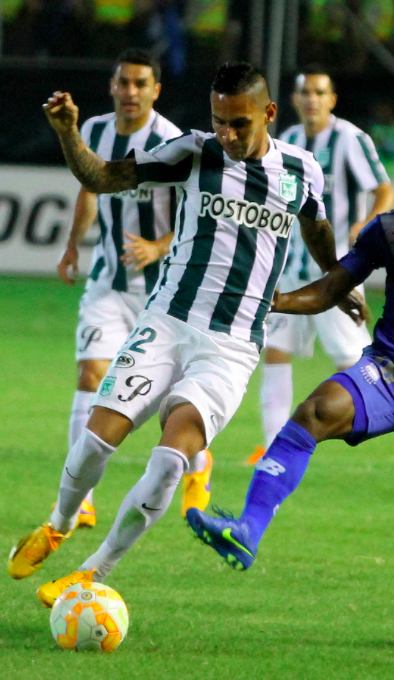
- CS Emelec 2015

Personal information
- Full name: Gilberto García Olarte
- Date of birth: 27 January 1987 (age 39)
- Place of birth: Santa Marta, Colombia
- Height: 1.80 m (5 ft 11 in)
- Position: Right back

Team information
- Current team: Deportivo Pasto
- Number: 20

Senior career*
Years	Team	Apps	(Gls)
2006–2012	Deportes Tolima	33	(0)
2007	→ Cúcuta Deportivo (loan)	1	(0)
2008–2009	→ Atlético Bucaramanga (loan)	7	(0)
2009	→ Deportivo Pasto (loan)	13	(0)
2010	→ Deportivo Cali (loan)	2	(0)
2011–2012	→ Deportivo Pasto (loan)	84	(17)
2013–2014	Once Caldas	17	(2)
2013	→ Real Valladolid (loan)	6	(1)
2014	→ Independiente Medellín (loan)	28	(2)
2015–2016	Atlético Nacional	62	(3)
2017	Once Caldas	34	(3)
2018	Deportivo Pasto	33	(3)
2019	Atlético Nacional	3	(0)
2019	Rionegro Águilas	8	(0)
2020	Cúcuta Deportivo	14	(0)
2021	Deportivo Pereira	18	(0)
2022–	Deportivo Pasto	43	(1)

International career
2012	Colombia	1	(0)
- * Club domestic league appearances and goals as of 19:57, 9 May 2020 (UTC)

Gilberto García Olarte (born 27 January 1987), also known as Alcatraz, is a Colombian professional footballer who plays for Deportivo Pasto.

== Career statistics ==
Club	Season	League		Cup		Continental		Other		Total	
Club	Season	Apps	Goals	Apps	Goals	Apps	Goals	Apps	Goals	Apps	Goals
Atlético Bucaramanga (loan)	2008	7	0	0	0	0	0	0	0	7	0
Deportivo Pasto (loan)	2009	13	0	0	0	0	0	0	0	13	0
Deportivo Cali (loan)	2010	2	0	0	0	0	0	0	0	2	0
Deportivo Pasto (loan)	2010	0	0	1	0	0	0	0	0	1	0
Deportivo Pasto (loan)	2011	41	13	8	1	0	0	0	0	49	14
Deportivo Pasto (loan)	2012	43	4	7	0	0	0	0	0	50	4
Deportivo Pasto (loan)	Total	84	17	16	1	0	0	0	0	100	18
Once Caldas	2013	17	2	2	0	0	0	0	0	19	2
Real Valladolid (loan)	2013	8	1	1	0	0	0	0	0	9	1
Independiente Medellín (loan)	2014	23	1	5	1	0	0	0	0	28	2
Atlético Nacional	2015	34	3	0	0	6	0	2	0	42	3
Atlético Nacional	2016	25	0	2	0	2	0	1	0	30	0
Atlético Nacional	Total	59	3	2	0	8	0	3	0	72	3
Career total		213	24	26	2	8	0	3	0	250	26

== Honours ==
Atlético Nacional

- Categoría Primera A (1): 2015 Finalización
- Copa Colombia (1): 2016
- Copa Libertadores (1): 2016
- Superliga Colombiana (1): 2016

Deportivo Pasto

- Categoría Primera B (1): 2011
