= Brayan Rovira =

Colombian footballer (born 1996)

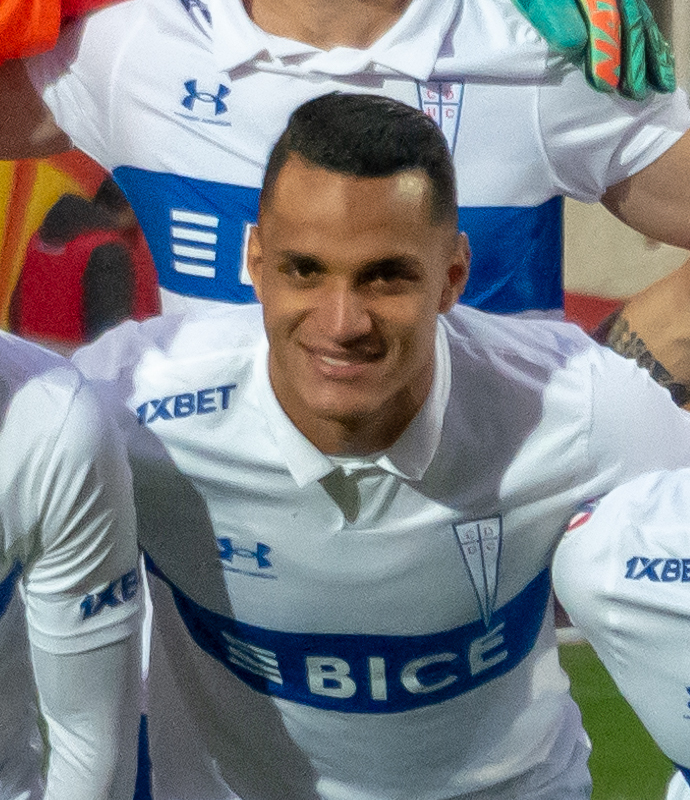

Personal information
- Full name: Brayan Andrés Rovira Ferreira
- Date of birth: 2 December 1996 (age 29)
- Place of birth: Bosconia, Colombia
- Height: 1.77 m (5 ft 10 in)
- Position: Midfielder

Team information
- Current team: Deportes Tolima
- Number: 80

Youth career
- Atlético Nacional

Senior career*
Years	Team	Apps	(Gls)
2014–2024	Atlético Nacional	88	(4)
2016–2017	→ Envigado (loan)	37	(2)
2017–2018	→ Atlético Bucaramanga (loan)	53	(5)
2022	→ Deportes Tolima (loan)	35	(2)
2023	→ Universidad Católica (loan)	21	(0)
2024	→ Deportes Tolima (loan)	26	(0)
2025–	Deportes Tolima	13	(1)

International career
2013	Colombia U17	4	(0)
2015	Colombia U20	7	(0)
- * Club domestic league appearances and goals as of 16 May 2025

Brayan Andrés Rovira Ferreira (born 2 December 1996) is a Colombian professional footballer who plays as midfielder for Deportes Tolima.

== Honours ==
=== Club ===
Atlético Nacional

- Categoría Primera A (2): 2014 Apertura, 2015 Finalización
- Superliga Colombiana (1): 2016
