= Ezequiel Rescaldani =

Argentine footballer

Personal information
- Full name: Ezequiel Edison Rescaldani
- Date of birth: 11 June 1992 (age 34)
- Place of birth: Leones, Argentina
- Height: 1.91 m (6 ft 3 in)
- Position: Forward

Youth career
- 2023: Sarmiento de Leones
- 2009: Instituto
- 2009: Belgrano
- 2009–2010: Vélez Sarsfield

Senior career*
Years	Team	Apps	(Gls)
2010–2013	Vélez Sarsfield	60	(12)
2012–2016	→ Quilmes (loan)	20	(10)
2014–2016	Málaga	8	(1)
2015	→ Puebla (loan)	14	(3)
2016–2018	Atlético Nacional	25	(4)
2017	→ Talleres Córdoba (loan)	12	(2)
2017–2018	→ Huesca (loan)	22	(2)
2018–2019	Patronato	15	(1)
2019–2020	Arsenal Sarandí	16	(2)
2020–2021	San Martín SJ	27	(10)
2022	Santiago Wanderers	14	(2)
2023–2024	Deportivo Morón	45	(9)
Total		278	(58)
- * Club domestic league appearances and goals

Ezequiel Edison Rescaldani (born 11 June 1992) is an Argentine former professional footballer who played as a forward.

== Club career ==
=== Vélez Sarsfield ===
Rescaldani played youth football in hometown's Sarmiento de Leones, and after brief periods with Instituto and Belgrano, he had a trial with Vélez Sarsfield in August 2009, and subsequently signed a deal with the club.

Rescaldani played his first match as a professional on 24 September 2010, coming on as a substitute in a 3–0 win over Olimpo, in the 2010 Apertura. He appeared in three further matches in the campaign.

On 16 March 2012, Rescaldani joined Quilmes on loan until the end of the season. He featured regularly for the side, and scored his first professional goal on 16 June, netting the third of a 4–0 home routing over Gimnasia Jujuy.

Rescaldani returned to Vélez in July.

=== Málaga ===
On 31 January 2014, Rescaldani signed a six-month deal with La Liga side Málaga CF, with an option for a further four years. He made his debut in the competition on 31 March, replacing Francisco Portillo in a 2–1 win at Real Betis.

On 19 June 2015 Rescaldani was loaned to Mexican club Puebla, in a season-long deal.

== Honours ==
Vélez Sarsfield

- Argentine Primera División (2): 2011 Clausura, 2012 Inicial

Puebla

- Supercopa MX: 2015

Atletico Nacional

- CONMEBOL: 2016 Copa Libertadores
- Copa Colombia: 2016
