= Daniel Londoño (footballer) =

Colombian footballer (born 1995)

Personal information
- Full name: Daniel Londoño Castañeda
- Date of birth: 1 January 1995 (age 31)
- Place of birth: Itagüí, Colombia
- Height: 1.85 m (6 ft 1 in)
- Position: Defender

Team information
- Current team: Independiente Medellín
- Number: 33

Senior career*
Years	Team	Apps	(Gls)
2014–2015	Envigado	44	(1)
2016	Atlético Nacional	11	(0)
2016	Atlético Huila	6	(0)
2017-2022	Envigado FC	83	(4)
2023-	Independiente Medellin	107	(5)

International career
2014–2015	Colombia U20	5	(0)
- * Club domestic league appearances and goals as of 11 December 2025

Daniel Londoño (born 1 January 1995) is a Colombian professional footballer who plays as defender for Deportivo Independiente Medellin.

== Honours ==
Atlético Nacional

- Superliga Colombiana (1): 2016
