= Farid Díaz =

Colombian footballer (born 1983)

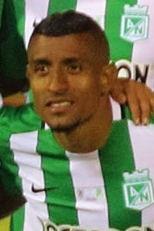
- Díaz lining up for Atlético Nacional in 2016

Personal information
- Full name: Farid Alfonso Díaz Rhenals
- Date of birth: 20 July 1983 (age 43)
- Place of birth: Agustín Codazzi, Colombia
- Height: 1.69 m (5 ft 7 in)
- Position: Left back

Senior career*
Years	Team	Apps	(Gls)
2003–2006	Atlético Bucaramanga	49	(0)
2006	Deportivo Rionegro	27	(0)
2007	Equidad	3	(0)
2007–2011	Envigado	71	(0)
2008–2011	→ Deportivo Pereira (loan)	27	(0)
2012–2017	Atlético Nacional	155	(2)
2017–2018	Olimpia	28	(0)
2018	Valledupar	8	(0)
2019	Alianza Petrolera	43	(0)
2020–2022	Club Nacional	9	(0)

International career
2016–2018	Colombia	19	(0)
Medal record
Representing Colombia
Men's football
FIFA U-20 World Cup
Third place	2003
- * Club domestic league appearances and goals as of 11:03, 25 May 2020 (UTC)

Farid Alfonso Díaz Rhenals (born 20 July 1983) is a Colombian former professional footballer who played as a left back.

== Career ==
Díaz made his international debut against Panama on 9 May 2007. In May 2018, he was named in the preliminary squad for the 2018 FIFA World Cup. Although initially not being picked in the final list, he was later called up as a replacement for the injured Frank Fabra.

== Career statistics ==
=== Club ===
As of 4 June 2016

Club performance			League		Cup		Continental		Total	
Season	Club	League	Apps	Goals	Apps	Goals	Apps	Goals	Apps	Goals
Colombia			League		Cup (Note: Includes Copa Colombia and Superliga Colombiana.)		South America		Total	
2012	Atlético Nacional	Categoría Primera A	28	0	14	0	7	0	49	0
2013	Atlético Nacional	Categoría Primera A	40	0	13	0	6	0	59	0
2014	Atlético Nacional	Categoría Primera A	28	1	10	0	20	0	58	1
2015	Atlético Nacional	Categoría Primera A	41	0	3	0	5	0	49	0
2016	Atlético Nacional	Categoría Primera A	8	0	2	0	23	0	33	0
Career total			145	1	42	0	61	0	243	0

=== International ===
As of 3 July 2018

Colombia
Year	Apps	Goals
2007	5	0
2016	10	0
2017	3	0
2018	1	0
Total	19	0

== Honours ==
Olimpia

- Primera División: 2018 Apertura

Atlético Nacional

- Copa Libertadores: 2016
- Categoría Primera A: 2013-I, 2013-II, 2014-I, 2015-II, 2017-I
- Copa Colombia: 2012, 2013, 2016
- Superliga Colombiana: 2012, 2016

Envigado

- Categoría Primera B: 2007

Colombia

- Copa América third place: 2016
