= Cristian Bonilla =

Colombian footballer (born 1993)

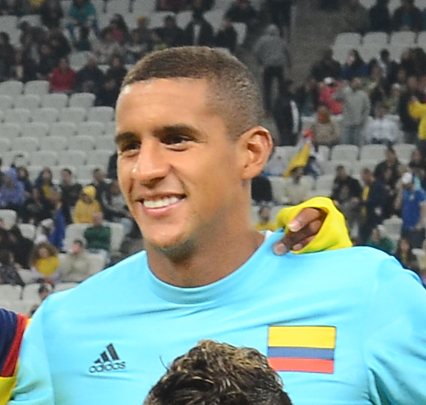
- Bonilla with Colombia Olympic team at the 2016 Olympics

Personal information
- Full name: Cristian Harson Bonilla Garzón
- Date of birth: 2 June 1993 (age 33)
- Place of birth: Manizales, Colombia
- Height: 1.88 m (6 ft 2 in)
- Position: Goalkeeper

Senior career*
Years	Team	Apps	(Gls)
2009–2012	Boyacá Chicó	30	(0)
2012–2018	Atlético Nacional	56	(0)
2015	→ La Equidad (loan)	28	(0)
2017–2018	→ La Equidad (loan)	29	(0)
2018–2019	Al-Fayha	15	(0)
2019–2021	La Equidad	40	(0)
2020	→ Millonarios (loan)	1	(0)
2022	San Antonio FC	3	(0)

International career
2008–2009	Colombia U17	6	(0)
2011–2013	Colombia U20	16	(0)
2016	Colombia Olympic	8	(0)
Medal record
Colombia
Copa América Centenario
Bronze medal – third place	2016 United States
- * Club domestic league appearances and goals as of 14:45, 1 April 2022 (UTC)

Cristian Harson Bonilla Garzón (born 2 June 1993) is a retired Colombian professional footballer who played as a goalkeeper.

Bonilla made his debut within the Colombian top tier at only 16 years of age with Boyacá Chicó, before eventually signing with Colombian giants Atletico Nacional, where he went on to win a double in his debut year, winning both the Copa Colombia title and the first Superliga Colombiana.

He represented Colombia at the 2011 Toulon Tournament, where he was the best player of the final, as he went on to save two penalties in the penalty shoot out against France. Colombia went on to beat France 3–1, thus obtaining Colombia's 3rd title at the tournament. He featured in all of Colombia's matches at the 2011 FIFA U-20 World Cup, where the hosts reached the quarter-finals. He was also the starting choice for the 2013 South American Youth Championship, where Colombia won their 3rd title.

== Club career ==
=== Boyacá Chicó ===
Bonilla began his career in Boyacá Chicó. He made his debut at sixteen in the Copa Colombia. He appeared in several games with Chicó in the 2010 season. On 1 June 2012, it was announced that Bonilla would be sent on loan to Atlético Nacional with a buying option.

=== Atlético Nacional ===
==== 2012 ====
With both Nacional goalkeepers Gastón Pezzuti and Franco Armani injured, Bonilla would be the first choice goalkeeper for the rest of the 2012 season. He made his official debut with Los Verdolagas on 22 July 2012 against Junior in the second leg of the Superliga Colombiana, a match that ended 3–0 favoring Nacional. This was his first clean sheet for the club as well as the first title of his club career.

He made his first league appearance on 29 July 2012 against Deportivo Cali, conceding three goals in a 3–1 defeat.

Bonilla's second title would come in the 2012 Copa Colombia final against Deportivo Pasto. Due to his effective performance, Bonilla was able to achieve two clean sheets in the two-leg series. On 24 November 2012, Bonilla was put on the bench for the first time during his time with Nacional in a match against Itagüí. As a result of Pezzuti's recovery, Bonilla would compete for a spot in the starting eleven. However, due to what Bonilla had achieved to the moment with the club, Pezutti would be relegated to the bench. Armani was still recovering him his injury.

==== Equidad Seguros (loan) ====
He was loaned at Bogota based club La Equidad in December 2014. He went on to perform an impressive season, resulting in a call up for the Colombia national football team.

==== Return to Atlético Nacional ====
In December 2015, Bonilla extended his link to the club, until 2018. He returns to Atlético Nacional in 2016.

==== Equidad Seguros (loan) ====
On 27 June 2017, Bonilla rejoined La Equidad on loan, looking for more playing time.

=== Al-Fayha ===
Om 26 July 2018, Bonilla joined Saudi Pro League side Al-Fayha.

=== Later career ===
On 25 July 2019, Bonilla returned to Colombia and rejoined La Equidad in the Categoría Primera A. A year later, on 17 July 2020, Bonilla joined Millonarios on loan with an option to make the move permanent. His loan at Millonarios was cancelled, and he returned to La Equidad for the 2021 season.

On 27 January 2022, Bonilla moved to the United States, joining USL Championship club San Antonio FC. After starting in 3 matches, Bonilla announced his retirement from professional football on 31 March 2022.

== International career ==
Bonilla had his first international experience with the Colombian U-17 side disputing the 2009 South American Under-17 Football Championship, securing a fourth-place finish to qualify for the 2009 FIFA U-17 World Cup where Colombia had also finished fourth. Bonilla was part of the U-20 team that won the 2011 Toulon Tournament. He was selected to be the starting goalkeeper for the 2011 FIFA U-20 World Cup hosted in Colombia.

His previous talents representing Colombia over these recent years led him to return to the U20 team at the 2013 South American Youth Championship. He was selected as the number 1 goalkeeper playing in every match with the exception of the final where Colombia won their 3rd South American Youth title. He was praised for his impressive improvement since the last youth tournaments.

Bonilla made a return to the Toulon Tournament in the 2013 edition, where he made it to the finals with Colombia. However, Colombia gave away the sole winning goal in the first half in a 1–0 loss against Brazil. Despite this, he won the Meilleur gardien award.

=== Senior ===
On 11 May 2015, Bonilla was included in Colombia's 30-man preliminary squad for the 2015 Copa América. On 30 May 2015 he was put on the final 23-man list for the Copa América as the third choice keeper behind Camilo Vargas and David Ospina as the starting goalkeeper in the tournament. Bonilla did not make an appearance in the cup.

The following year he made the cut for Colombia's squad for the Copa América Centenario. Just as in his previous participation he did not play any matches.

== Career statistics ==
=== Club ===
As of 20 October 2023

Appearances and goals by club, season and competition
Club	Season	League			National Cup		Continental		Other		Total	
Club	Season	Division	Apps	Goals	Apps	Goals	Apps	Goals	Apps	Goals	Apps	Goals
Boyacá Chicó	2010	Categoría Primera A	8	0	0	0	—		—		8	0
Boyacá Chicó	2011	Categoría Primera A	11	0	6	0	—		—		17	0
Boyacá Chicó	2012	Categoría Primera A	2	0	3	0	—		—		5	0
Boyacá Chicó	Total		21	0	9	0	0	0	0	0	30	0
Atlético Nacional	2012	Categoría Primera A	15	0	5	0	0	0	1 (Note: Appearance in Superliga Colombiana)	0	21	0
Atlético Nacional	2013	Categoría Primera A	15	0	3	0	0	0	—		18	0
Atlético Nacional	2014	Categoría Primera A	4	0	3	0	0	0	—		7	0
Atlético Nacional	2016	Categoría Primera A	16	0	3	0	0	0	—		19	0
Atlético Nacional	2017	Categoría Primera A	6	0	0	0	0	0	—		6	0
Atlético Nacional	Total		56	0	14	0	0	0	1	0	71	0
La Equidad (loan)	2015	Categoría Primera A	28	0	2	0	—		—		30	0
La Equidad (loan)	2017	Categoría Primera A	22	0	1	0	—		—		23	0
La Equidad (loan)	2018	Categoría Primera A	7	0	0	0	—		—		7	0
La Equidad (loan)	Total		57	0	3	0	0	0	0	0	60	0
Al-Fayha	2018–19	Saudi Pro League	15	0	1	0	—		—		16	0
La Equidad	2019	Categoría Primera A	6	0	0	0	—		—		6	0
La Equidad	2020	Categoría Primera A	4	0	0	0	—		—		4	0
La Equidad	2021	Categoría Primera A	30	0	0	0	4 (Note: Appearances in Copa Sudamericana)	0	—		34	0
La Equidad	Total		40	0	0	0	4	0	0	0	44	0
Millonarios (loan)	2020	Categoría Primera A	1	0	0	0	0	0	—		1	0
San Antonio	2022	USL Championship	3	0	0	0	—		—		3	0
Career total			193	0	27	0	4	0	1	0	225	0

== Honours ==
=== Club ===
Atlético Nacional

- Categoría Primera A (3): 2013-I, 2013-II, 2014-I
- Copa Colombia (2): 2012, 2013
- Superliga Colombiana (1): 2012
- Copa Libertadores (1): 2016

=== International ===
Colombia U-20

- Toulon Tournament (1): 2011
- South American Youth Championship (1): 2013

Colombia

- Copa América: Third place 2016

=== Individual ===
- Toulon Tournament 2013 voted Meilleur Gardien.
