= Juan Carlos de La Cuesta =

Juan Carlos de La Cuesta is a Colombian executive and the ex chairman of Atlético Nacional of the Categoría Primera A. He is a former accountant and financial manager for first Postobón and subsequently Organización Ardila Lülle, as well as serving as the club's own finance manager.
