= Arley Rodríguez =

Colombian footballer (born 1993)

Personal information
- Full name: Arley José Rodríguez Henry
- Date of birth: 13 February 1993 (age 33)
- Place of birth: San Andrés, Colombia
- Height: 1.76 m (5 ft 9 in)
- Position: Forward

Team information
- Current team: UCV
- Number: 93

Youth career
- Atlético Nacional

Senior career*
Years	Team	Apps	(Gls)
2011–2018	Atlético Nacional	23	(5)
2013	→ Elche B (loan)	0	(0)
2014	→ Dépor (loan)	13	(4)
2014	→ Leones (loan)	24	(4)
2015	→ Alianza Petrolera (loan)	31	(5)
2018–2019	Tigres UANL	0	(0)
2018	→ Lobos BUAP (loan)	2	(0)
2018–2019	→ Santa Fe (loan)	29	(2)
2019	Envigado	15	(1)
2020	Carlos A. Mannucci	22	(4)
2021–2022	Alianza Lima	43	(6)
2023	Deportivo Pereira	34	(5)
2024–	UCV	5	(0)

International career
2015–2016	Colombia Olympic	6	(0)
- * Club domestic league appearances and goals as of 13:46, 1 August 2021 (UTC)

Arley Rodríguez (born 13 February 1993) is a Colombian professional footballer who plays as forward for Liga 1 club UCV.

== Honours ==
Atlético Nacional

- Superliga Colombiana: 2016
