= Luis Ruiz (footballer, born 1987) =

Colombian footballer

Luis Carlos Ruiz
Personal information
- Full name: Luis Carlos Ruiz Morales
- Date of birth: 8 January 1987 (age 39)
- Place of birth: Santa Marta, Colombia
- Height: 1.87 m (6 ft 2 in)
- Position: Forward

Senior career*
Years	Team	Apps	(Gls)
2007	Barranquilla	32	(18)
2008–2014	Junior	191	(34)
2014	Shanghai Shenhua	9	(1)
2014–2017	Atlético Nacional	64	(17)
2016	→ Sport Recife (loan)	12	(1)
2018–2019	Junior	20	(4)
2021–2022	Cortuluá	32	(13)
2022–2023	Millonarios	34	(6)
Total		379	(93)
- * Club domestic league appearances and goals

Luis Carlos Ruiz Morales (born 8 January 1987) is a Colombian former professional footballer who played as a striker.

== Career ==
Ruiz was the joint top goal scorer during the 2013 Torneo Finalización with Dayro Moreno, both scoring 16 goals.

In December 2013, Ruiz claimed he had signed a Four-year contract with Neftchi Baku in the Azerbaijani Premier League, though this claim was denied by Neftchi. On 4 January 2014, Ruiz announced that he wouldn't be joining Neftchi after all and that the statement posted had been the result of hackers hacking his Twitter account.

In February 2014, Ruiz joined Shanghai Greenland Shenhua in the Chinese Super League. The transfer fee was about €3 million, and he linked up with fellow Colombian Giovanni Moreno. In June 2014, Ruiz returned to Colombia, signing for Atlético Nacional.

== Career statistics ==
Appearances and goals by club, season and competition
Club	Season	League			Cup		Continental		Total	
Club	Season	Division	Apps	Goals	Apps	Goals	Apps	Goals	Apps	Goals
Barranquilla	2007	Categoría Primera B	32	18	0	0	—		32	18
Junior	2008	Categoría Primera A	12	0	5	0	—		17	0
Junior	2009	Categoría Primera A	37	3	0	0	—		37	3
Junior	2010	Categoría Primera A	30	1	6	0	—		36	1
Junior	2011	Categoría Primera A	31	3	8	0	1	0	40	3
Junior	2012	Categoría Primera A	38	8	4	0	6	1	48	9
Junior	2013	Categoría Primera A	37	18	5	1	—		42	19
Junior	2014	Categoría Primera A	6	1	0	0	—		6	1
Junior	Total		191	34	28	1	7	1	226	36
Shanghai Greenland Shenhua	2014	Chinese Super League	9	1	0	0	—		9	1
Atlético Nacional	2014	Categoría Primera A	12	2	3	3	11	3	26	8
Atlético Nacional	2015	Categoría Primera A	18	5	3	1	8	4	29	10
Atlético Nacional	2016	Categoría Primera A	9	3	2	1	6	1	17	5
Atlético Nacional	2017	Categoría Primera A	25	7	2	0	6	0	33	7
Atlético Nacional	Total		64	17	10	5	31	8	105	30
Sport Recife (loan)	2016	Série A	12	1	—		1	0	13	1
Junior	2018	Categoría Primera A	14	3	1	0	12	3	27	6
Junior	2019	Categoría Primera A	8	1	2	1	2	0	12	2
Junior	Total		22	4	3	1	14	3	39	8
Cortuluá	2021	Categoría Primera B	14	2	—		—		14	2
Cortuluá	2022	Categoría Primera A	18	11	—		—		18	11
Cortuluá	Total		32	13	—		—		32	13
Millonarios	2022	Categoría Primera A	24	5	5	2	—		29	7
Millonarios	2023	Categoría Primera A	10	1	0	0	1	0	11	1
Millonarios	Total		34	6	5	2	1	0	32	13
Career total			379	93	45	8	54	12	478	114

== Honours ==
=== Club ===
Atlético Nacional

- Categoría Primera A (3): 2014–I, 2015–II, 2017–I
- Superliga Colombiana (1): 2016
- Copa Libertadores (1): 2016
- Recopa Sudamericana (1): 2017

Junior

- Categoría Primera A (4): 2010–I, 2011–II, 2018–II, 2019–I
- Superliga Colombiana (1): 2019

Millonarios

- Categoría Primera A (1): 2023–I
- Copa Colombia (1): 2022
