= Marlon Torres =

Colombian footballer (born 1996)

Personal information
- Full name: Marlon Aldair Torres Obeso
- Date of birth: 17 April 1996 (age 30)
- Place of birth: Barranquilla, Colombia
- Height: 1.80 m (5 ft 11 in)
- Position: Defender

Team information
- Current team: Deportes Tolima
- Number: 17

Senior career*
Years	Team	Apps	(Gls)
2015	Atlético Nacional	0	(0)
2016	Leones	27	(1)
2017-2018	Atlético Bucaramanga	77	(3)
2019–2022	América de Cali	121	(4)
2023	Independiente Santa Fe	7	(0)
2023–	Deportes Tolima	68	(1)
- * Club domestic league appearances and goals as of 16 May 2025

Marlon Aldair Torres Obeso (born 17 April 1996) is a Colombian professional footballer for Deportes Tolima.
