= Diego Peralta (Colombian footballer) =

Colombian footballer (born 1985)

Personal information
- Full name: Diego Arturo Peralta González
- Date of birth: January 2, 1985 (age 41)
- Place of birth: Cúcuta, Colombia
- Position: Centre back

Team information
- Current team: Cúcuta Deportivo
- Number: 2

Senior career*
Years	Team	Apps	(Gls)
2005–2006	Árabe Unido		
2006	Independiente Medellín		
2007–2008	Bajo Cauca		
2008	Bogotá		
2009	Atlético Bucaramanga		
2010–2011	Cúcuta Deportivo	52	(6)
2011–2013	Deportivo Cali	56	(0)
2013–2016	Atlético Nacional	48	(3)
2016–2017	Atlético Bucaramanga	27	(2)
2017	Deportivo Pasto	16	(1)
2018–2019	Once Caldas	55	(3)
2020–	Cúcuta Deportivo	5	(0)
- * Club domestic league appearances and goals

Diego Arturo Peralta González (born 2 January 1985) is a Colombian football defender that plays for Cúcuta Deportivo.

== Honours ==
=== Club ===
Atlético Nacional

- Categoría Primera A (2): 2013-II, 2014-I
- Copa Colombia (1): 2013
