= Elkin Blanco =

Colombian footballer (born 1989)

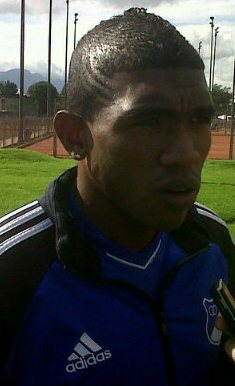
- Blanco with Millonarios in 2012

Personal information
- Full name: Elkin Blanco Rivas
- Date of birth: September 5, 1989 (age 37)
- Place of birth: Acandí, Chocó, Colombia
- Height: 1.79 m (5 ft 10 in)
- Position: Midfielder

Team information
- Current team: Orense
- Number: 15

Senior career*
Years	Team	Apps	(Gls)
2008	Once Caldas	16	(0)
2009–2016	Millonarios	143	(2)
2014	→ Sheriff Tiraspol (loan)	7	(0)
2016–2017	Atlético Nacional	35	(1)
2017–2018	América de Cali	30	(0)
2019	Rionegro Águilas	14	(0)
2019	Atlético Bucaramanga	7	(0)
2020–	Orense	4	(0)
- * Club domestic league appearances and goals as of 20:17, 26 July 2020 (UTC)

Elkin Blanco Rivas (Note: In this Spanish name, the first or paternal surname is Blanco and the second or maternal family name is Rivas.) (born 5 September 1989), known as Elkin Blanco, is a Colombian football midfielder who currently plays for Orense in the Categoría Primera A.

== Career ==
=== Club ===
In July 2014, Blanco joined Moldovan Divizia Națională side Sheriff Tiraspol on a six-month loan. Blanco returned to Millonarios at the end of his loan deal in January 2015.

=== International ===
He has played in the with the U-20. In 2009, he played South American Championship U-20 in Venezuela.

== Career statistics ==
=== Club ===
As of 26 November 2016

Appearances and goals by club, season and competition
Club	Season	League			National Cup		Continental		Super Cup		Total	
Club	Season	Division	Apps	Goals	Apps	Goals	Apps	Goals	Apps	Goals	Apps	Goals
Millonarios	2009	Categoría Primera A	17	0	8	0	—		—		25	0
Millonarios	2010	Categoría Primera A	18	0	5	0	—		—		23	0
Millonarios	2011	Categoría Primera A	19	1	16	0	—		—		35	1
Millonarios	2012	Categoría Primera A	21	0	9	0	6	0	—		36	0
Millonarios	2013	Categoría Primera A	36	0	11	0	4	0	2	0	53	0
Millonarios	2014	Categoría Primera A	4	0	0	0	—		—		4	0
Millonarios	2015	Categoría Primera A	11	0	1	0	—		—		12	0
Millonarios	2016	Categoría Primera A	17	1	4	0	—		—		21	1
Millonarios	Total		143	2	54	0	10	0	2	0	209	2
Sheriff Tiraspol (loan)	2014–15	Divizia Națională	7	0	0	0	4	0	—		11	0
Atlético Nacional	2016	Categoría Primera A	16	1	4	0	8	0	—		28	1
Career total			166	3	58	0	22	0	2	0	248	3
