= Juan Pablo Nieto =

Colombian footballer (born 1993)

Personal information
- Full name: Juan Pablo Nieto Salazar
- Date of birth: 25 February 1993 (age 33)
- Place of birth: Pereira, Colombia
- Height: 1.78 m (5 ft 10 in)
- Position: Attacking midfielder

Team information
- Current team: Deportes Tolima
- Number: 15

Youth career
- Atlético Nacional

Senior career*
Years	Team	Apps	(Gls)
2012–2018	Atlético Nacional	60	(4)
2012–2015	→ Alianza Petrolera (loan)	62	(5)
2018–2019	Once Caldas	35	(2)
2019–	Deportes Tolima	170	(10)

International career
2013	Colombia U20	7	(2)
2015–2016	Colombia Olympic	5	(1)
- * Club domestic league appearances and goals as of 07 June 2025

Juan Pablo Nieto Salazar (born 25 February 1993) is a Colombian professional footballer who plays as midfielder for Deportes Tolima.

== Honours ==
=== Club ===
Alianza Petrolera

- Categoría Primera B (1): 2012

Atlético Nacional

- Superliga Colombiana (1): 2016
