= Edwin Velasco =

Colombian footballer (born 1991)

Personal information
- Full name: Edwin Alexis Velasco Uzuriaga
- Date of birth: 5 November 1991 (age 35)
- Place of birth: Padilla, Colombia
- Height: 1.79 m (5 ft 10 in)
- Position: Left back

Team information
- Current team: Deportivo Pereira
- Number: 31

Youth career
- Cortuluá

Senior career*
Years	Team	Apps	(Gls)
2011–2016	Cortuluá	113	(0)
2013	→ Once Caldas (loan)	2	(0)
2016–2018	Atlético Nacional	38	(1)
2018–2019	Once Caldas	28	(2)
2019–2021	América de Cali	37	(1)
2021-2022	Atlético Junior	31	(1)
2023-2024	America de Cali	69	(2)
2025	Deportivo Pasto	8	(0)
2025-	Deportivo Pereira	11	(0)
- * Club domestic league appearances and goals as of 12 December 2025

Edwin Velasco (born 5 November 1991) is a Colombian professional footballer who plays as a left back for Deportivo Pereira.
