= Juan David Ramírez =

Colombian footballer (born 1997)

Personal information
- Full name: Juan David Ramírez Bolívar
- Date of birth: 9 January 1997 (age 29)
- Place of birth: Medellín, Colombia
- Height: 1.81 m (5 ft 11 1/2 in)
- Position: Goalkeeper

Team information
- Current team: Austin Bold (on loan from Atlético Nacional)
- Number: 1

Senior career*
Years	Team	Apps	(Gls)
2016–	Atlético Nacional	1	(0)
2019–	→ Austin Bold (loan)	5	(0)
- * Club domestic league appearances and goals as of 25 October 2019

Juan David Ramírez Bolívar (born 9 January 1997) is a Colombian footballer who currently plays as a goalkeeper for Austin Bold, on loan from Atlético Nacional.

Ramírez was at the Atlético Nacional youth set-up from 2013 until he made his debut for the first team in 2016. He made no more appearances for the first team until going on loan in 2019. However, he has been in goal for the under 20s.

== Career statistics ==
=== Club ===
As of 20 March 2019.

Club	Season	League			Cup		Continental		Other		Total	
Club	Season	Division	Apps	Goals	Apps	Goals	Apps	Goals	Apps	Goals	Apps	Goals
Atlético Nacional	2016	Categoría Primera A	1	0	0	0	0	0	0	0	1	0
Atlético Nacional	2017	Categoría Primera A	0	0	0	0	0	0	0	0	0	0
Atlético Nacional	2018	Categoría Primera A	0	0	0	0	0	0	0	0	0	0
Atlético Nacional	2019	Categoría Primera A	0	0	0	0	0	0	0	0	0	0
Atlético Nacional	Total		1	0	0	0	0	0	0	0	1	0
Austin Bold (loan)	2019	USL Championship	0	0	0	0	–		0	0	0	0
Career total			1	0	0	0	0	0	0	0	1	0
