= Luis Hurtado (Colombian footballer) =

Colombian footballer (born 1994)

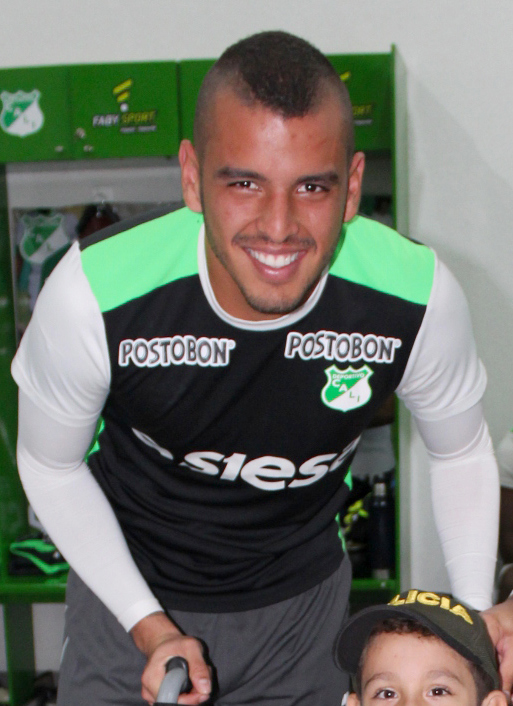
- Hurtado with Deportivo Cali in 2016

Personal information
- Full name: Luis Alfonso Hurtado Osorio
- Date of birth: 24 January 1994 (age 32)
- Place of birth: Cali, Colombia
- Height: 1.86 m (6 ft 1 in)
- Position: Goalkeeper

Senior career*
Years	Team	Apps	(Gls)
2014–2019	Deportivo Cali	28	(0)
2016	→ Atlético (loan)	8	(0)
2017	→ Real Cartagena (loan)	25	(0)
2018	→ Deportivo Pereira (loan)	30	(0)
2019	→ Deportivo La Guaira (loan)	3	(0)
2019	→ Fortaleza CEIF (loan)	7	(0)
2020	Tauro	0	(0)
2021–2022	Patriotas Boyacá	21	(0)

International career
2011	Colombia U17	1	(0)
2013	Colombia U20	2	(0)
2016	Colombia Olympic	2	(0)
- * Club domestic league appearances and goals as of 09:36, 9 June 2020 (UTC)

Luis Hurtado (born 24 January 1994) is a retired Colombian professional footballer who plays as a goalkeeper.

== Club career ==
=== Early career at Deportivo Cali ===
Palacios started his career in the youth ranks of Deportivo Cali. He made his debut for Deportivo on 23 March 2013, as a replacement for keepers, Faryd Mondragón and José Johan Silva were out due to injuries. On 27 March, he made his continental debut against O'Higgins in Copa Libertadores, and the following week, kept his first clean sheet against Uniatónoma in a 2–0 victory. His debut in Copa Sudamericana was successful, keeping a clean sheet against UT Cajamarca, in a 0–0 draw.

==== Loans ====
On 15 July 2016, Hurtado joined Altético Cali on loan until the end of the season. On 16 December 2016, he joined Real Cartagena on loan, for the 2017 season. He then joined Primera B side Deportivo Pereira on loan, on 5 January 2018. In January 2019, Hurtado joined Venezuelan Primera División club Deportivo La Guaira on loan. After his unsuccessful spell in Venezuela, he joined Fortaleza CEIF on loan, in the Colombian second Division.

=== Later career ===
In October 2020, Hurtado joined Panamanian club Tauro for the Clausura 2020 of Liga Panameña de Fútbol. He made his debut in the CONCACAF League round of 16 against Canadian side Forge FC, where he had to be replaced at half time due to injury. Hurtado left the club without making his league debut.

On 13 January 2021, Patriotas Boyacá announced the signing of Hurtado.

In 2024, an article emerged, following a video posted by Hurtado on TikTok, stating that he had moved to the United States and was now working as a cleaner.

== International career ==
José Pékerman called up Hurtado for a training squad with the senior Colombia squad in February 2016.

== Career statistics ==
=== Club ===
As of 10 November 2023

Appearances and goals by club, season and competition
Club	Season	League			National Cup		Continental (Note: Appearances in Copa Libertadores, Copa Sudamericana and CONCACAF League)		Total	
Club	Season	Division	Apps	Goals	Apps	Goals	Apps	Goals	Apps	Goals
Deportivo Cali	2013	Categoría Primera A	0	0	2	0	0	0	2	0
Deportivo Cali	2014	Categoría Primera A	20	0	2	0	5	0	27	0
Deportivo Cali	2015	Categoría Primera A	2	0	5	0	0	0	7	0
Deportivo Cali	2016	Categoría Primera A	6	0	0	0	3	0	9	0
Deportivo Cali	Total		28	0	9	0	8	0	45	0
Altético Cali	2016	Categoría Primera B	8	0	0	0	0	0	8	0
Real Cartagena	2017	Categoría Primera B	25	0	7	0	0	0	32	0
Deportivo Pereira	2018	Categoría Primera B	30	0	1	0	0	0	31	0
Deportivo La Guaira	2019	Venezuelan Primera División	3	0	0	0	0	0	3	0
Fortaleza CEIF	2016	Categoría Primera B	7	0	0	0	0	0	7	0
Tauro	2020	Liga Panameña de Fútbol	0	0	0	0	1	0	1	0
Patriotas Boyacá	2021	Categoría Primera A	5	0	0	0	0	0	5	0
Patriotas Boyacá	2022	Categoría Primera A	16	0	2	0	0	0	18	0
Patriotas Boyacá	Total		21	0	2	0	0	0	23	0
Career total			122	0	19	0	9	0	150	0

== Honours ==
=== Club ===
==== Deportivo Cali ====
- Categoría Primera A: 2015 A
- Superliga Colombiana: 2014

=== International ===
Colombia U20

- South American Youth Football Championship: 2013
