= 2013 Copa Colombia =

Copa Postobón 2013

Tournament details
- Country: Colombia
- Teams: 36

Final positions
- Champions: Atlético Nacional (2nd title)
- Runners-up: Millonarios
- 2014 Copa Sudamericana: Atlético Nacional

Tournament statistics
- Top goal scorer(s): Yorleys Mena (14 goals)

The 2013 Copa Colombia, officially the 2013 Copa Postobón for sponsorship reasons, was the 11th edition of the Copa Colombia, the national cup competition for clubs of DIMAYOR. It began on February 15 and ended on November 8. The tournament comprised a total of 36 teams. The winner earned a berth to the 2014 Copa Sudamericana.

== Group stage ==
The 36 teams were divided into six groups based on each separate region of Colombia. Each group was played in home-and-away round-robin format. The group winners and runners-up, along with the four best third-placed teams, advanced to the Round of 16. The matches were played from February 13 to June 5.

=== Group A ===
Team	Pld	W	D	L	GF	GA	GD	Pts	RCA	UMA	JUN	UAU	VAL	BAR
Real Cartagena	10	6	3	1	22	9	+13	21		5–1	1–2	3–1	2–2	5–0
Unión Magdalena	10	5	4	1	17	14	+3	19	0–0		1–1	2–1	4–1	1–0
Junior	10	4	6	0	17	6	+11	18	1–1	1–1		3–1	6–0	0–0
Uniautónoma	10	2	3	5	13	16	−3	9	1–2	2–3	1–1		1–0	1–1
Valledupar	10	1	4	5	6	19	−13	7	0–1	1–1	0–0	0–3 (Note: Awarded)		1–1
Barranquilla	10	0	4	6	6	17	−11	4	1–2	2–3	0–2	1–1	0–1	

Legend: Blue = home team win; Yellow = draw; Red = away team win.

=== Group B ===
Team	Pld	W	D	L	GF	GA	GD	Pts	NAC	MED	RIO	ITA	ENV	JAG
Atlético Nacional	10	6	1	3	18	9	+9	19		5–2	3–1	4–0	0–1	2–0
Ind. Medellín	10	4	3	3	12	12	0	15	2–0		1–1	1–0	2–1	2–3
Dep. Rionegro	10	3	5	2	10	9	+1	14	2–0	0–0		0–1	1–0	0–0
Itagüí	10	4	2	4	8	11	−3	14	0–2	1–0	1–2		1–1	1–1
Envigado	10	2	4	4	9	11	−2	10	0–1	1–1	1–1	0–2		2–0
Jaguares	10	1	5	4	9	14	−5	8	1–1	0–1	2–2	0–1	2–2	

Legend: Blue = home team win; Yellow = draw; Red = away team win.

=== Group C ===
Team	Pld	W	D	L	GF	GA	GD	Pts	BOY	ALP	BUC	CUC	PAT	RSA
Boyacá Chicó	10	5	3	2	15	10	+5	18		3–1	2–0	1–1	1–0	2–1
Alianza Petrolera	10	5	2	3	16	9	+7	17	0–0		1–0	3–0	1–0	4–2
Atl. Bucaramanga	10	5	2	3	13	11	+2	17	2–2	2–1		3–1	2–1	1–0
Cúcuta Deportivo	10	4	1	5	10	18	−8	13	2–1	0–4	2–1		2–1	0–2
Patriotas	10	3	3	4	10	9	+1	12	2–1	0–0	1–1	2–1		3–0
Real Santander	10	2	1	7	8	15	−7	7	1–2	2–1	0–1	0–1	0–0	

Legend: Blue = home team win; Yellow = draw; Red = away team win.

=== Group D ===
Team	Pld	W	D	L	GF	GA	GD	Pts	MIL	SAF	LLA	EXR	EQU	BOG
Millonarios	10	5	5	0	21	10	+11	20		1–1	4–1	5–1	2–1	2–2
Santa Fe	10	3	6	1	10	8	+2	15	1–1		0–0	1–0	1–1	1–1
Llaneros	10	4	3	3	9	11	−2	15	1–1	2–1		0–1	2–1	2–1
Expreso Rojo	10	4	2	4	10	12	−2	14	0–0	2–2	2–0		0–1	2–1
La Equidad	10	3	3	4	9	9	0	12	1–2	0–1	0–0	1–0		0–0
Bogotá	10	0	3	7	8	17	−9	3	1–3	0–1	0–1	1–2	1–3	

Legend: Blue = home team win; Yellow = draw; Red = away team win.

=== Group E ===
Team	Pld	W	D	L	GF	GA	GD	Pts	CAL	AME	PAS	DEP	COR	UPO
Deportivo Cali	10	4	5	1	12	6	+6	17		1–0	1–1	3–0	1–1	0–0
América	10	4	3	3	9	6	+3	15	2–0		2–0	1–0	1–0	2–2
Deportivo Pasto	10	4	3	3	7	7	0	15	0–1	1–0		1–0	1–1	1–0
Depor	10	3	3	4	9	13	−4	12	1–4	1–1	1–0		0–0	2–1
Cortuluá	10	1	8	1	9	7	+2	11	0–0	0–0	1–1	1–1		3–0
Univ. Popayán	10	1	4	5	8	15	−7	7	1–1	1–0	0–1	1–3	2–2	

Legend: Blue = home team win; Yellow = draw; Red = away team win.

=== Group F ===
Team	Pld	W	D	L	GF	GA	GD	Pts	QUI	FOR	TOL	PER	OCA	HUI
Deportes Quindío	10	4	6	0	17	11	+6	18		1–1	2–2	1–0	1–0	3–2
Fortaleza	10	4	3	3	11	9	+2	15	1–1		0–1	1–0	3–0 (Note: Awarded)	2–0
Deportes Tolima	10	4	3	3	18	18	0	15	3–3	5–0		1–1	2–1	3–2
Deportivo Pereira	10	3	5	2	15	11	+4	14	1–1	1–0	3–0		2–2	2–0
Once Caldas	10	3	3	4	16	17	−1	12	1–1	0–3	4–1	4–4		3–0
Atlético Huila	10	1	2	7	7	18	−11	5	0–3	0–0	2–0	1–1	0–1	

Legend: Blue = home team win; Yellow = draw; Red = away team win.

=== Ranking of third-placed teams ===
Grp	Team	Pld	W	D	L	GF	GA	GD	Pts
A	Junior	10	4	6	0	17	6	+11	18
C	Atlético Bucaramanga	10	5	2	3	13	11	+2	17
F	Deportes Tolima	10	4	3	3	18	18	0	15
E	Deportivo Pasto	10	4	3	3	7	7	0	15
D	Llaneros	10	4	3	3	9	11	−2	15
B	Deportivo Rionegro	10	3	5	2	10	9	+1	14

== Knockout phase ==
Each tie in the knockout phase was played in home-and-away two-legged format. In each tie, the team which had the better overall record up to that stage host the second leg, except in the round of 16 where the group winners automatically hosted the second leg. In case of a tie in aggregate score, neither the away goals rule nor extra time was applied, and the tie was decided by a penalty shoot-out.

=== Bracket ===
Round of 16
Fortaleza	3	2	5
América	0	1	1
Junior	2	0	2 (0)
Millonarios	0	2	2 (3)
Unión Magdalena	1	1	2 (2)
Deportivo Cali	1	1	2 (3)
Atlético Bucaramanga	1	0	1
Real Cartagena	1	2	3
Deportes Tolima	2	2	4
Boyacá Chicó	1	2	3
Santa Fe	0	2	2 (4)
Alianza Petrolera	0	2	2 (5)
Independiente Medellin	0	1	1
Deportes Quindío	2	1	3
Deportivo Pasto	0	0	0
Atlético Nacional	3	1	4

Quarterfinals
Fortaleza	1	3	4 (4)
Millonarios	3	1	4 (5)
Deportivo Cali	2	1	3
Real Cartagena	3	2	5
Deportes Tolima	2	0	2 (4)
Alianza Petrolera	1	1	2 (5)
Deportes Quindío	0	0	0
Atlético Nacional	1	1	2

Semifinals
Millonarios	6	0	6
Real Cartagena	1	2	3
Alianza Petrolera	0	0	0
Atlético Nacional	2	1	3

Final
Millonarios	2	0	2
Atlético Nacional	2	1	3

=== Round of 16 ===
First legs: August 7, 8, 13, 14; Second legs: August 14, 15, September 9.

Team 1	Agg.	Team 2	1st leg	2nd leg
Fortaleza	5–1	América	3–0	2–1
Junior	2–2 (0–3 p)	Millonarios	2–0	0–2
Unión Magdalena	2–2 (2–3 p)	Deportivo Cali	1–1	1–1
Atlético Bucaramanga	1–3	Real Cartagena	1–1	0–2
Deportes Tolima	4–3	Boyacá Chicó	2–1	2–2
Santa Fe	2–2 (4–5 p)	Alianza Petrolera	0–0	2–2
Independiente Medellín	1–3	Deportes Quindío	0–2	1–1
Deportivo Pasto	0–4	Atlético Nacional	0–3	0–1

=== Quarterfinals ===
First legs: September 11; Second legs: September 17, 18.

Team 1	Agg.	Team 2	1st leg	2nd leg
Fortaleza	4–4 (4–5 p)	Millonarios	1–3	3–1
Deportivo Cali	3–5	Real Cartagena	2–3	1–2
Deportes Tolima	2–2 (4–5 p)	Alianza Petrolera	2–1	0–1
Deportes Quindío	0–2	Atlético Nacional	0–1	0–1

=== Semifinals ===
First legs: October 10, 13; Second legs: October 16.

Team 1	Agg.	Team 2	1st leg	2nd leg
Millonarios	6–3	Real Cartagena	6–1	0–2
Alianza Petrolera	0–3	Atlético Nacional	0–2	0–1

=== Final ===
First leg: November 13; Second leg: November 17.

Team 1	Agg.	Team 2	1st leg	2nd leg
Millonarios	2–3	Atlético Nacional	2–2	0–1
