= 2016 Copa Colombia =

Copa Águila 2016

Tournament details
- Country: Colombia
- Teams: 36

Final positions
- Champions: Atlético Nacional (3rd title)
- Runners-up: Junior
- 2017 Copa Sudamericana: Deportes Tolima

Tournament statistics
- Top goal scorer: Miguel Borja (8 goals)

The 2016 Copa Colombia, officially the 2016 Copa Águila for sponsorship reasons, was the 14th edition of the Copa Colombia, the national cup competition for clubs of DIMAYOR. It began on 10 February and ended on 17 November. The tournament comprised a total of 36 teams, and the winners were Atlético Nacional, who defeated defending champions Junior 3–1 on aggregate score in the final. However, neither Atlético Nacional nor Junior earned a berth to the 2017 Copa Sudamericana for having qualified for the Copa Libertadores, with semifinalists Deportes Tolima qualifying instead.

== Format ==
The competition retained the format used in its most recent edition. The first stage was played by 32 teams, which were split into eight groups of four teams each on a regional basis, where teams played each other of the teams in their group twice. The 8 group winners plus the best 4 second-placed teams joined the teams qualified for the 2016 Copa Libertadores (Deportivo Cali, Atlético Nacional, and Santa Fe) and the previous edition's winners (Junior) in the round of 16, from where the cup continued on a home-and-away knockout basis.

== Group stage ==
=== Group A ===
Pos	Team	Pld	W	D	L	GF	GA	GD	Pts	Qualification	RCA	LEO	JAG	BAR
1	Real Cartagena	6	5	1	0	8	3	+5	16	Advanced to knockout stage	—	0–0	3–2	1–0
2	Leones	6	2	3	1	8	5	+3	9		0–1	—	1–1	2–2
3	Jaguares	6	2	1	3	7	8	−1	7		0–1	1–2	—	2–1
4	Barranquilla	6	0	1	5	4	11	−7	1		1–2	0–3	0–1	—

Source: DIMAYOR
Rules for classification: 1) Points, 2) Goal difference, 3) Goals for, 4) Away goals for, 5) Goals against, 6) Drawing of lots

=== Group B ===
Pos	Team	Pld	W	D	L	GF	GA	GD	Pts	Qualification	DIM	ENV	ONC	RIO
1	Independiente Medellín	6	4	2	0	12	2	+10	14	Advanced to knockout stage	—	1–1	2–0	2–0
2	Envigado	6	3	2	1	6	7	−1	11	Advanced to knockout stage	1–5	—	1–0	0–0
3	Once Caldas	6	2	1	3	6	7	−1	7		0–0	0–1	—	3–2
4	Rionegro Águilas	6	0	1	5	4	12	−8	1		0–2	1–2	1–3	—

Source: DIMAYOR
Rules for classification: 1) Points, 2) Goal difference, 3) Goals for, 4) Away goals for, 5) Goals against, 6) Drawing of lots

=== Group C ===
Pos	Team	Pld	W	D	L	GF	GA	GD	Pts	Qualification	CUC	APE	RSA	BUC
1	Cúcuta Deportivo	6	3	2	1	9	7	+2	11	Advanced to knockout stage	—	3–1	1–0	1–1
2	Alianza Petrolera	6	2	3	1	7	6	+1	9		3–1	—	1–1	1–0
3	Real Santander	6	1	4	1	7	7	0	7		2–2	1–1	—	1–0
4	Atlético Bucaramanga	6	0	3	3	3	6	−3	3		0–1	0–0	2–2	—

Source: DIMAYOR
Rules for classification: 1) Points, 2) Goal difference, 3) Goals for, 4) Away goals for, 5) Goals against, 6) Drawing of lots

=== Group D ===
Pos	Team	Pld	W	D	L	GF	GA	GD	Pts	Qualification	PAS	VAL	UPO	MAG
1	Deportivo Pasto	6	3	2	1	12	4	+8	11	Advanced to knockout stage	—	4–1	3–0	4–1
2	Valledupar	6	3	1	2	8	10	−2	10	Advanced to knockout stage	0–0	—	2–1	3–2
3	Universitario de Popayán	6	2	1	3	8	11	−3	7		1–1	2–0	—	2–1
4	Unión Magdalena	6	2	0	4	10	13	−3	6		1–0	1–2	4–2	—

Source: DIMAYOR
Rules for classification: 1) Points, 2) Goal difference, 3) Goals for, 4) Away goals for, 5) Goals against, 6) Drawing of lots

=== Group E ===
Pos	Team	Pld	W	D	L	GF	GA	GD	Pts	Qualification	AME	ATL	ORS	COR
1	América	6	5	1	0	11	4	+7	16	Advanced to knockout stage	—	2–1	2–0	4–2
2	Atlético	6	2	2	2	6	5	+1	8		0–1	—	2–1	0–0
3	Orsomarso	6	1	2	3	5	9	−4	5		1–1	0–2	—	2–1
4	Cortuluá	6	0	3	3	5	9	−4	3		0–1	1–1	1–1	—

Source: DIMAYOR
Rules for classification: 1) Points, 2) Goal difference, 3) Goals for, 4) Away goals for, 5) Goals against, 6) Drawing of lots

=== Group F ===
Pos	Team	Pld	W	D	L	GF	GA	GD	Pts	Qualification	PAT	LLA	BOY	FOR
1	Patriotas	6	3	3	0	9	6	+3	12	Advanced to knockout stage	—	1–1	3–3	2–1
2	Llaneros	6	2	3	1	8	3	+5	9		0–1	—	3–0	3–0
3	Boyacá Chicó	6	1	3	2	5	9	−4	6		0–0	0–0	—	2–1
4	Fortaleza	6	1	1	4	6	10	−4	4		1–2	1–1	2–0	—

Source: DIMAYOR
Rules for classification: 1) Points, 2) Goal difference, 3) Goals for, 4) Away goals for, 5) Goals against, 6) Drawing of lots

=== Group G ===
Pos	Team	Pld	W	D	L	GF	GA	GD	Pts	Qualification	MIL	EQU	TIG	BOG
1	Millonarios	6	4	2	0	9	4	+5	14	Advanced to knockout stage	—	1–1	2–1	2–0
2	La Equidad	6	2	4	0	9	4	+5	10	Advanced to knockout stage	0–0	—	2–2	2–0
3	Tigres	6	1	3	2	7	8	−1	6		1–2	0–0	—	1–1
4	Bogotá	6	0	1	5	4	13	−9	1		1–2	1–4	1–2	—

Source: DIMAYOR
Rules for classification: 1) Points, 2) Goal difference, 3) Goals for, 4) Away goals for, 5) Goals against, 6) Drawing of lots

=== Group H ===
Pos	Team	Pld	W	D	L	GF	GA	GD	Pts	Qualification	QUI	TOL	HUI	PER
1	Deportes Quindío	6	4	1	1	9	7	+2	13	Advanced to knockout stage	—	3–2	1–0	2–0
2	Deportes Tolima	6	3	2	1	12	7	+5	11	Advanced to knockout stage	4–1	—	2–1	0–0
3	Atlético Huila	6	1	2	3	5	7	−2	5		1–1	2–2	—	0–1
4	Deportivo Pereira	6	1	1	4	1	6	−5	4		0–1	0–2	0–1	—

Source: DIMAYOR
Rules for classification: 1) Points, 2) Goal difference, 3) Goals for, 4) Away goals for, 5) Goals against, 6) Drawing of lots

=== Ranking of second-placed teams ===
The four best teams among those ranked second qualified for the knockout stage.

Pos	Grp	Team	Pld	W	D	L	GF	GA	GD	Pts	Result
1	H	Deportes Tolima	6	3	2	1	12	7	+5	11	Knockout stage
2	B	Envigado	6	3	2	1	6	7	−1	11	Knockout stage
3	G	La Equidad	6	2	4	0	9	4	+5	10	Knockout stage
4	D	Valledupar	6	3	1	2	8	10	−2	10	Knockout stage
5	F	Llaneros	6	2	3	1	8	3	+5	9	
6	A	Leones	6	2	3	1	8	5	+3	9	
7	C	Alianza Petrolera	6	2	3	1	7	6	+1	9	
8	E	Atlético	6	2	2	2	6	5	+1	8	

Source: DIMAYOR
Rules for classification: 1) Points, 2) Goal difference, 3) Goals for, 4) Away goals for, 5) Goals against, 6) Drawing of lots

== Knockout phase ==
Each tie in the knockout phase was played in a home-and-away two-legged format. In each tie, the team which had the better overall record up to that stage hosted the second leg, except in the round of 16 where the group winners automatically hosted the second leg. In case of a tie in aggregate score, neither the away goals rule nor extra time is applied, and the tie is decided by a penalty shoot-out. Deportivo Cali, Atlético Nacional, Santa Fe, and Junior entered the competition in the Round of 16, being joined there by the eight group winners and the four best second-placed teams.

=== Bracket ===
Round of 16
Independiente Medellín	1	4	5
Valledupar	0	1	1
Deportivo Pasto	2	0	2 (4)
Junior (p)	1	1	2 (5)
Millonarios	0	0	0
Deportes Tolima	0	3	3
América	1	1	2
Deportivo Cali	2	1	3
Cúcuta Deportivo	0	1	1
La Equidad	0	3	3
Deportes Quindío	1	2	3 (2)
Santa Fe (p)	2	1	3 (3)
Patriotas	1	2	3
Envigado	0	2	2
Real Cartagena	2	0	2
Atlético Nacional	1	2	3

Quarterfinals
Independiente Medellín	0	1	1
Junior	3	2	5
Deportes Tolima (p)	0	2	2 (4)
Deportivo Cali	2	0	2 (2)
La Equidad	0	0	0
Santa Fe	1	2	3
Patriotas	0	2	2
Atlético Nacional	3	1	4

Semifinals
Junior (p)	0	2	2 (5)
Deportes Tolima	0	2	2 (3)
Santa Fe	1	1	2
Atlético Nacional	1	4	5

Final
Junior	1	0	1
Atlético Nacional	2	1	3

=== Round of 16 ===
First legs: July 27, 28, and August 3; Second legs: August 3, 4, 10, 11, and 18. Group winners (Team 2) hosted the second leg.

Team 1	Agg.	Team 2	1st leg	2nd leg
Atlético Nacional	3–2	Real Cartagena	1–2	2–0
Valledupar	1–5	Independiente Medellín	0–1	1–4
La Equidad	3–1	Cúcuta Deportivo	0–0	3–1
Deportivo Cali	3–2	América	2–1	1–1
Envigado	2–3	Patriotas	0–1	2–2
Junior	2–2 (5–4 p)	Deportivo Pasto	1–2	1–0
Santa Fe	3–3 (3–2 p)	Deportes Quindío	2–1	1–2
Deportes Tolima	3–0	Millonarios	0–0	3–0

=== Quarterfinals ===
First legs: August 24, 25, 31, and September 1; Second legs: August 31, September 7, and 8. Team 2 hosted the second leg.

Team 1	Agg.	Team 2	1st leg	2nd leg
Atlético Nacional	4–2	Patriotas	3–0	1–2
Junior	5–1	Independiente Medellín	3–0	2–1
Santa Fe	3–0	La Equidad	1–0	2–0
Deportivo Cali	2–2 (2–4 p)	Deportes Tolima	2–0	0–2

=== Semifinals ===
First legs: October 4 and 5; Second legs: October 12 and 13. Team 2 hosted the second leg.

Team 1	Agg.	Team 2	1st leg	2nd leg
Deportes Tolima	2–2 (3–5 p)	Junior	0–0	2–2
Atlético Nacional	5–2	Santa Fe	1–1	4–1

=== Final ===
First leg: November 13; Second leg: November 17. Team 2 hosted the second leg.

Team 1	Agg.	Team 2	1st leg	2nd leg
Atlético Nacional	3–1	Junior	2–1	1–0

== Top goalscorers ==
Rank	Name	Club	Goals
1	(Colombia) Miguel Borja	Cortuluá / Atlético Nacional	8
2	(Paraguay) Víctor Aquino	Deportes Tolima	6
3	(Colombia) Johan Arango	Deportivo Pasto	5
4	(Colombia) José David Lloreda	Cúcuta Deportivo / Deportivo Cali	4
4	(Argentina) Hernán Hechalar	Independiente Medellín	4
4	(Colombia) Leonardo Castro	Independiente Medellín	4
4	(Colombia) Luis Cuesta	La Equidad	4

Source: Resultados.com
