= 2016 Superliga Colombiana =

Deportivo Cali	Atlético Nacional
0	5
- on aggregate

First leg
Deportivo Cali	Atlético Nacional
0	2
- Date: 23 January 2016
- Venue: Estadio Deportivo Cali, Palmira
- Referee: Juan Carlos Gamarra

Second leg
Atlético Nacional	Deportivo Cali
3	0
- Date: 27 January 2016
- Venue: Estadio Atanasio Girardot, Medellín
- Referee: Nicolás Gallo

The 2016 Superliga Colombiana (known as the 2016 Superliga Águila for sponsorship purposes) was the fifth edition of the Superliga Colombiana. Atlético Nacional were the winners and qualified for the 2016 Copa Sudamericana.

== Teams ==
Team	Qualification	Previous appearances (bold indicates winners)
Deportivo Cali	2015 Apertura champions	1 (**2014**)
Atlético Nacional	2015 Finalización champions	3 (**2012**, 2014, 2015)

== Matches ==
=== First leg ===
23 January 2016
18:00 UTC−5

Deportivo Cali	0–2	Atlético Nacional
	Report	Copete 25', 84'

Estadio Deportivo Cali, Palmira
Referee: Juan Carlos Gamarra

=== Second leg ===
27 January 2016
19:00 UTC−5

Atlético Nacional	3–0	Deportivo Cali
Torres 5'; Pérez 51'; Ruiz 88'	Report

Estadio Atanasio Girardot, Medellín
Referee: Nicolás Gallo
