= 2018 Atlético Nacional season =

Atlético Nacional
2018 season
- Chairman: Andrés Botero Phillipsbourne (until 8 February); Juan David Pérez (since 12 February)
- Manager: Jorge Almirón (until 30 August); Hernán Darío Herrera (interim) (since 30 August to 1 November); Paulo Autuori (since 2 November)
- Stadium: Atanasio Girardot
- Categoría Primera A: Apertura: Runners-up; Finalización: 9th
- Copa Colombia: Champions
- Copa Libertadores: Round of 16
- Superliga Colombiana: Runners-up
- Top goalscorer: League: Dayro Moreno (19 goals); All: Dayro Moreno (24 goals)
- Highest home attendance: 42,560 (v. Millonarios)
- Lowest home attendance: 7,986 (v. Leones)
- Average home league attendance: 19,698 (A) 16,751 (C)
Home colours	Away colours	Third colours

The 2018 Atlético Nacional season was the 71st season in the club's history. The team competed in the Categoría Primera A, Copa Colombia, Superliga Colombiana, and Copa Libertadores.

== Players ==
=== First-team squad ===
As of 6 November 2018

Note: Flags indicate national team as defined under FIFA eligibility rules; some limited exceptions apply. Players may hold more than one non-FIFA nationality.

No.	Pos.	Nation	Player
1	GK	ARG	Fernando Monetti
2	DF	COL	Daniel Bocanegra
3	DF	COL	Felipe Aguilar
4	DF	ARG	Diego Braghieri
6	MF	COL	Raúl Loaiza
7	MF	COL	Gustavo Torres
9	FW	COL	Omar Duarte
10	MF	COL	Juan Pablo Ramírez
11	FW	COL	Carlos Rivas (on loan from New York Red Bulls)
12	DF	COL	Alexis Henríquez
13	DF	COL	Helibelton Palacios
14	FW	COL	Reinaldo Lenis (on loan from Sport Recife)

No.	Pos.	Nation	Player
15	DF	COL	Deiver Machado
16	MF	COL	Vladimir Hernández
19	MF	COL	Yerson Candelo
20	MF	COL	Jeison Lucumí
21	MF	COL	Jorman Campuzano (on loan from Deportivo Pereira)
25	GK	COL	Christian Vargas
26	DF	COL	Carlos Cuesta
27	MF	ARG	Gonzalo Castellani
29	MF	COL	Aldo Leão Ramírez (on loan from Atlas)
32	DF	COL	Christian Mafla

=== Out on loan ===
Note: Flags indicate national team as defined under FIFA eligibility rules; some limited exceptions apply. Players may hold more than one non-FIFA nationality.

No.	Pos.	Nation	Player
—	GK	COL	Camilo Vargas (at Deportivo Cali)
—	DF	COL	Albin Domínguez (at Real Santander)
—	FW	COL	Nicolás Hernández (at Real Santander)
—	DF	COL	Tomás Maya (at Deportivo Pasto)
—	DF	COL	Esteban Morales (at Bogotá)
—	DF	COL	Jeisson Palacios (at Cortuluá)
—	DF	COL	Franky Uribe (at Real Santander)
—	MF	COL	Sherman Cárdenas (at Atlético Bucaramanga)

No.	Pos.	Nation	Player
—	MF	COL	Cristian Dájome (at América de Cali)
—	MF	COL	Julián Mendoza (at Real Cartagena)
—	MF	COL	Cristian Moya (at Real Santander)
—	MF	COL	Jean Riveras (at Real Santander)
—	MF	COL	John Henry Sánchez (at Leones)
—	FW	COL	Hadier Borja (at América de Cali)
—	FW	COL	Juan David Castañeda (at Real Santander)
—	FW	COL	Jeferson Rivas (at Tigres)

== Transfers ==
Source: Soccerway

=== In ===
Pos.	Name	Age	Moving from	Type	Date
GK	(Colombia) Cristian Bonilla	25	(Colombia) La Equidad	Loan return	30 June 2018
DF	(Colombia) Omar Duarte	22	(Colombia) Atlético Huila	Transfer	30 June 2018
DF	(Colombia) Tomás Maya	21	(Colombia) Deportivo Pasto	Loan return	30 June 2018
MF	(Colombia) Juan Pablo Ramírez	20	(Colombia) Leones	Loan return	30 June 2018
FW	(Colombia) Carlos Rivas	24	(United States) New York Red Bulls	Loan	30 June 2018
DF	(Colombia) Deiver Machado	24	(Belgium) Gent	Transfer	30 June 2018
MF	(Colombia) Yerson Candelo	26	(Mexico) Querétaro	Transfer	19 June 2018
DF	(Colombia) Jeisson Palacios	21	(Colombia) Atlético Bucaramanga	Loan return	19 June 2018
FW	(Argentina) Ezequiel Rescaldani	25	(Spain) Huesca	Loan return	28 May 2018
FW	(Colombia) Reinaldo Lenis	25	(Brazil) Sport Recife	Loan	5 February 2018
DF	(Argentina) Rafael Delgado	28	(Argentina) Defensa y Justicia	Loan	3 February 2018
DF	(Colombia) Camilo Zúñiga	32	(Italy) Napoli	Loan	30 January 2018
MF	(Argentina) Gonzalo Castellani	28	(Argentina) Boca Juniors	Transfer	25 January 2018
MF	(Colombia) Sherman Cárdenas	28	(Ecuador) LDU Quito	Loan return	24 January 2018
GK	(Argentina) Fernando Monetti	28	(Argentina) Lanús	Transfer	16 January 2018
DF	(Argentina) Diego Braghieri	30	(Argentina) Lanús	Transfer	16 January 2018
DF	(Colombia) Helibelton Palacios	24	(Belgium) Club Brugge	Transfer	31 December 2017
MF	(Colombia) Vladimir Hernández	28	(Brazil) Santos	Transfer	31 December 2017
FW	(Colombia) Cristián Dajome	23	(Colombia) Deportivo Pasto	Loan return	31 December 2017
MF	(Colombia) Jorman Campuzano	21	(Colombia) Deportivo Pereira	Loan	31 December 2017
FW	(Colombia) Juan David Castañeda	22	(Colombia) Fortaleza	Loan return	31 December 2017
DF	(Colombia) Tomás Maya	21	(Colombia) Leones	Loan return	31 December 2017
MF	(Colombia) Juan Pablo Ramírez	20	(Colombia) Deportivo Pasto	Loan return	31 December 2017

=== Out ===
Pos.	Name	Age	Moving to	Type	Date
FW	(Colombia) Dayro Moreno	33	(Mexico) Club Tijuana	Fired	16 October 2018
DF	(Argentina) Rafael Delgado	28	(Argentina) Defensa y Justicia	Loan return	31 July 2018
GK	(Colombia) Cristian Bonilla	25	(Saudi Arabia) Al-Fayha	Transfer	30 June 2018
DF	(Panama) Roderick Miller	26	Free agent	Transfer	30 June 2018
MF	(Colombia) Juan Pablo Nieto	25	(Colombia) Once Caldas	Transfer	30 June 2018
MF	(Colombia) Macnelly Torres	33	(Colombia) Deportivo Cali	Transfer	30 June 2018
DF	(Colombia) Tomás Maya	21	(Colombia) Atlético Huila	Loan	30 June 2018
FW	(Colombia) Andrés Rentería	25	(Mexico) Querétaro	Loan return	24 June 2018
FW	(Colombia) Hadier Borja	21	(Colombia) América de Cali	Loan	19 June 2018
DF	(Colombia) Jeisson Palacios	21	(Colombia) Cortuluá	Loan	19 June 2018
MF	(Venezuela) Ronaldo Lucena	21	(Venezuela) Deportivo Táchira	Transfer	12 June 2018
DF	(Colombia) Edwin Velasco	26	(Colombia) Once Caldas	Transfer	12 June 2018
MF	(Colombia) Diego Arias	32	(Colombia) Once Caldas	Transfer	12 June 2018
DF	(Colombia) Jackson Montaño	25	(Colombia) Deportes Quindío	Loan return	31 May 2018
FW	(Argentina) Ezequiel Rescaldani	25	(Argentina) Patronato	Transfer	28 May 2018
DF	(Colombia) José Pérez	20	(Colombia) Cúcuta Deportivo	Transfer	21 March 2018
FW	(Colombia) Jeferson Rivas	20	(Colombia) Tigres	Loan	15 March 2018
MF	(Colombia) Jean Rivera	20	(Colombia) Real Santander	Loan	22 February 2018
MF	(Colombia) Edwin Valencia	32	Free agent	Transfer	1 February 2018
MF	(Colombia) Sherman Cárdenas	28	(Colombia) Atlético Bucaramanga	Loan	24 January 2018
DF	(Spain) Gorka Elustondo	30	(Spain) Rayo Vallecano	Transfer	16 January 2018
GK	(Argentina) Franco Armani	30	(Argentina) River Plate	Transfer	8 January 2018
FW	(Colombia) Cristián Dajome	23	(Colombia) América de Cali	Loan	2 January 2018
FW	(Colombia) Juan David Castañeda	22	(Colombia) Real Santander	Loan	31 December 2017
DF	(Colombia) Nicolás Hernández	19	(Colombia) Real Santander	Loan	31 December 2017
MF	(Colombia) Cristian Moya	19	(Colombia) Real Santander	Loan	31 December 2017
DF	(Colombia) Albin Domínguez	19	(Colombia) Real Santander	Loan	31 December 2017
DF	(Colombia) Franky Uribe	19	(Colombia) Real Santander	Loan	31 December 2017
DF	(Colombia) Tomás Maya	21	(Colombia) Deportivo Pasto	Loan	31 December 2017
DF	(Colombia) Rodin Quiñónes	22	(Colombia) Independiente Medellín	Transfer	31 December 2017
DF	(Colombia) Ezequiel Palomeque	25	(Colombia) Deportivo Cali	Transfer	31 December 2017
GK	(Colombia) Camilo Vargas	28	(Colombia) Deportivo Cali	Loan	31 December 2017
MF	(Colombia) Jhon Mosquera	27	(Colombia) Deportivo Cali	Transfer	31 December 2017
FW	(Colombia) Luis Carlos Ruiz	30	(Colombia) Junior	Transfer	31 December 2017
MF	(Colombia) Juan Pablo Ramírez	20	(Colombia) Leones	Loan	31 December 2017

== Pre-season and friendlies ==
Match won	Match drawn	Match lost

14 January Florida Cup	Atlético Nacional (Colombia)	2–0	(Brazil) Atlético Mineiro	Orlando, United States
13:00 EST (UTC−5)	Rentería 38'; Lucumí 71'	Report		Stadium: Spectrum Stadium; Referee: Brandon Artis

17 January Friendly	Canada U23	1–2	(Colombia) Atlético Nacional	Bradenton, United States
	Fraser 45'	Report	Castañeda 88', 89'	Stadium: IMG Academy stadium

20 January Florida Cup	Legia Warsaw (Poland)	0–2	(Colombia) Atlético Nacional	St. Petersburg, United States
18:00 EST (UTC−5)		Report	Ramírez 36', 42'	Stadium: Al Lang Stadium; Referee: Guido Gonzalez Jr.

24 January Friendly	Atlético Nacional (Colombia)	2–0	(Colombia) Leones	Medellín, Colombia
10:00	Lucumí 22'; Rentería 52'	Report		Stadium: Atanasio Girardot Sports Complex

24 January Friendly	Atlético Nacional (Colombia)	0–0	(Colombia) Leones	Medellín, Colombia
17:30		Report		Stadium: Atanasio Girardot Sports Complex

27 January Friendly	Atlético Nacional (Colombia)	1–0	(Colombia) Rionegro Águilas	Medellín, Colombia
	Moreno 66'	Report		Stadium: Atanasio Girardot Sports Complex

12 July Friendly	Atlético Nacional (Colombia)	2–2 (5–4 p)	(Mexico) Guadalajara	Orlando, United States
19:00	A. Ramírez 37'; Moreno 63' (pen.)	Report	Pulido 51'; López 85'	Stadium: Spectrum Stadium
	Penalties
	Moreno (penalty scored); Torres (penalty scored); Candelo (penalty scored); J. Ramírez (penalty scored); Rivas (penalty scored)		(penalty scored) E. López; (penalty scored) Sandoval; (penalty missed) Godínez; (penalty scored) M. Pérez; (penalty scored) E. Hernández

17 July Friendly	Atlético Nacional (Colombia)	0–0	(Colombia) América de Cali	Harrison, United States
19:00 EST (UTC−5)		Report		Stadium: Red Bull Arena

20 July Friendly (Independence Cup)	Atlético Nacional (Colombia)	1–1 (4–5 p)	(Colombia) América de Cali	Harrison, United States
19:00 EST (UTC−5)	G. Torres (penalty scored)	Report	Dájome 55'	Stadium: Red Bull Arena
	Penalties
	G. Torres (penalty scored); Campuzano (penalty missed); Henríquez (penalty scored); Castellani (penalty scored); Monetti (penalty scored)		(penalty scored) Viveros; (penalty scored) Quiñones; (penalty scored) Rivas; (penalty scored) Franco; (penalty scored) Angulo

== Competitions ==
=== Overall ===
Competition	Started round	Final position / round	First match	Last match
Categoría Primera A Torneo Apertura	Matchday 1	Runners-up	4 February	9 June
Copa Libertadores	Group stage	Round of 16	27 February	28 August
Categoría Primera A Torneo Finalización	Matchday 1	9th	25 July	11 November
Copa Colombia	Round of 16	Champions	15 August	1 November
Superliga Colombiana	Finals	Runners-up	31 January	7 February

Updated to match played 11 November 2018
Source: Competitions

=== Categoría Primera A ===
==== Torneo Apertura ====
Pos	Team	Pld	W	D	L	GF	GA	GD	Pts	Qualification
1	Atlético Nacional	19	12	5	2	23	10	+13	41	Advance to the knockout phase
2	Independiente Medellín	19	11	2	6	32	23	+9	35	Advance to the knockout phase
3	Deportes Tolima	19	9	6	4	22	14	+8	33	Advance to the knockout phase
4	Atlético Huila	19	9	3	7	20	12	+8	30	Advance to the knockout phase
5	Junior	19	8	6	5	19	16	+3	30	Advance to the knockout phase

Source: Dimayor, Soccerway
Rules for classification: 1) Points, 2) Goal difference, 3) Goals for, 4) Away goals for, 5) Away goals against, 6) Drawing of lots.

Note: For a complete table see the main article

===== Home-away summary =====
Home
Pos	Team	Pld	W	D	L	GF	GA	GD	Pts
1	Atlético Nacional	9	9	0	0	12	0	+12	27

Away
Pos	Team	Pld	W	D	L	GF	GA	GD	Pts
1	Atlético Nacional	10	3	5	2	11	10	+1	14

===== Match results =====
Match won	Match drawn	Match lost

4 February 1	Deportes Tolima	0–1	Atlético Nacional	Ibagué
17:15		Report	Rentería 59'	Stadium: Estadio Manuel Murillo Toro; Attendance: 13,000; Referee: Éder Vergara

10 February 2	Atlético Nacional	1–0	Santa Fe	Medellín
20:00	Moreno 11'	Report		Stadium: Estadio Atanasio Girardot; Attendance: 23,749; Referee: Luis Sánchez

15 February 3	Patriotas	3–1	Atlético Nacional	Tunja
20:00	Rivas 43'; Álvarez 67'; Mosquera 90+3'	Report	Moreno 6' (pen.)	Stadium: Estadio La Independencia; Attendance: 4,500; Referee: Carlos Ortega

18 February 4	Millonarios	1–1	Atlético Nacional	Bogotá
20:00	Domínguez 20' (pen.)	Report	Rentería 78'	Stadium: Estadio El Campín; Attendance: 18,602; Referee: Mario Herrera

22 February 5	Atlético Nacional	2–0	América de Cali	Medellín
19:05	Hernández 75', 90+3'	Report		Stadium: Estadio Atanasio Girardot; Attendance: 22,390; Referee: John Hinestroza

3 March 6	Alianza Petrolera	1–2	Atlético Nacional	Barrancabermeja
18:00	Palacios 80'	Report	Moreno 19'; Lenis 47'	Stadium: Estadio Daniel Villa Zapata; Attendance: 8,000; Referee: Jorge Guzmán

7 March 7	Atlético Nacional	1–0	Jaguares	Medellín
20:00	Rentería 62'	Report		Stadium: Estadio Atanasio Girardot; Attendance: 14,176; Referee: Andrés Rojas

17 March 9	Atlético Nacional	2–0	Deportivo Pasto	Medellín
20:00	G. Torres 13'; Ramírez 83'	Report		Stadium: Estadio Atanasio Girardot; Attendance: 20,315; Referee: Ricardo García

22 March 8†	Atlético Bucaramanga	0–0	Atlético Nacional	Bucaramanga
20:00		Report		Stadium: Estadio Alfonso López; Attendance: 23,000; Referee: John Hinestroza

25 March 10	Envigado	2–2	Atlético Nacional	Envigado
17:15	Guzmán 82'; De La Rosa 90+2'	Report	G. Torres 20'; Ramírez 73'	Stadium: Estadio Polideportivo Sur; Attendance: 5,000; Referee: Nolberto Ararat

28 March 11	Atlético Nacional	1–0	Atlético Huila	Medellín
18:00	Moreno 54'	Report		Stadium: Estadio Atanasio Girardot; Attendance: 22,559; Referee: Leevan Suárez

1 April 12	Boyacá Chicó	1–1	Atlético Nacional	Tunja
20:00	Valdés 21'	Report	Henríquez 23'	Stadium: Estadio La Independencia; Attendance: 5,000; Referee: Andrés Rojas

8 April 13	Atlético Nacional	2–0	Independiente Medellín	Medellín
17:15	Moreno 28'; Hernández 90+1'	Report		Stadium: Estadio Atanasio Girardot; Attendance: 41,746; Referee: Bismark Santiago

15 April 15	Atlético Nacional	1–0	Rionegro Águilas	Medellín
20:00	M. Torres 23'	Report		Stadium: Estadio Atanasio Girardot; Attendance: 18,090; Referee: Nicolás Gallo

21 April 17	Atlético Nacional	1–0	Once Caldas	Medellín
19:45	Lucumí 63'	Report		Stadium: Estadio Atanasio Girardot; Attendance: 24,017; Referee: Luis Sánchez

25 April 16†	Junior	1–1	Atlético Nacional	Barranquilla
20:00	T. Gutiérrez 69'	Report	Sarmiento 90'	Stadium: Estadio Metropolitano Roberto Meléndez; Attendance: 15,095; Referee: Gustavo Murillo

29 April 18	La Equidad	1–0	Atlético Nacional	Bogotá
20:00	Zapata 73'	Report		Stadium: Estadio Metropolitano de Techo; Attendance: 6,000; Referee: John Ospina

2 May 14‡	Deportivo Cali	0–2	Atlético Nacional	Palmira
20:00		Report	G. Torres 9', 80'	Stadium: Estadio Deportivo Cali; Attendance: 18,000; Referee: Mario Herrera

6 May 19	Atlético Nacional	1–0	Leones	Medellín
20:00	Moreno 66'	Report		Stadium: Estadio Atanasio Girardot; Attendance: 18,689; Referee: Nolberto Ararat

†: Match postponed due to participation in the Copa Libertadores.
‡: Match postponed due to Deportivo Cali's participation in the Copa Sudamericana.

Knockout phase

===== Quarterfinals =====
12 May First leg	Deportivo Cali	1–0	Atlético Nacional	Palmira
20:00	Benedetti 78'	Report		Stadium: Estadio Deportivo Cali; Attendance: 24,000; Referee: Nicolás Gallo

19 May Second leg	Atlético Nacional	2–0	Deportivo Cali	Medellín
18:00	Moreno 51', 90+1' (pen.)	Report		Stadium: Estadio Atanasio Girardot; Attendance: 31,114; Referee: Gustavo Murillo

===== Semifinals =====
29 May First leg	Atlético Huila	0–0	Atlético Nacional	Bogotá
19:45		Report		Stadium: Estadio El Campín; Attendance: 29,308; Referee: Alexander Ospina

2 June Second leg	Atlético Nacional	0–0 (4–2 p)	Atlético Huila	Medellín
18:00		Report		Stadium: Estadio Atanasio Girardot; Attendance: 24,270; Referee: Carlos Betancur
	Penalties
	Moreno (penalty scored); Ramírez (penalty missed); Lucumí (penalty scored); Zúñiga (penalty scored); Castellani (penalty scored)		(penalty missed) Ramírez; (penalty scored) López; (penalty scored) Candelo; (penalty missed) Correa

===== Finals =====
6 June First leg	Deportes Tolima	0–1	Atlético Nacional	Ibagué
19:30		Report	Moreno 57'	Stadium: Estadio Manuel Murillo Toro; Attendance: 25,000; Referee: Andrés Rojas

9 June Second leg	Atlético Nacional	1–2 (2–4 p)	Deportes Tolima	Medellín
19:15	Hernández 66'	Report	Campuzano 47' (o.g.); Banguero 90+4'	Stadium: Estadio Atanasio Girardot; Referee: Luis Sánchez
	Penalties
	Moreno (penalty scored); Henríquez (penalty scored); Lenis (penalty missed); Hernández (penalty missed)		(penalty scored) Villa; (penalty scored) Albornoz; (penalty scored) Banguero; (penalty scored) Pérez

==== Torneo Finalización ====
Pos	Team	Pld	W	D	L	GF	GA	GD	Pts	Qualification
7	Rionegro Águilas	19	9	5	5	21	19	+2	32	Advance to the knockout phase
8	Santa Fe	19	8	7	4	27	13	+14	31	Advance to the knockout phase
9	Atlético Nacional	19	8	6	5	27	20	+7	30	
10	Deportivo Cali	19	8	5	6	19	15	+4	29	
11	Millonarios	19	6	7	6	23	23	0	25	

Source: Dimayor, Soccerway
Rules for classification: 1) Points, 2) Goal difference, 3) Goals for, 4) Away goals for, 5) Away goals against, 6) Drawing of lots.

Note: For a complete table see the main article

Home
Pos	Team	Pld	W	D	L	GF	GA	GD	Pts
8	Atlético Nacional	10	4	4	2	14	11	+3	16

Away
Pos	Team	Pld	W	D	L	GF	GA	GD	Pts
7	Atlético Nacional	9	4	2	3	13	9	+4	14

===== Match results =====
Match won	Match drawn	Match lost

25 July 1	Atlético Nacional	1–2	Deportes Tolima	Medellín
19:45	Moreno 16' (pen.)	Report	Pérez 11'; Carrascal 71'	Stadium: Estadio Atanasio Girardot; Attendance: 16,175; Referee: Heider Castro

28 July 2	Santa Fe	0–2	Atlético Nacional	Bogotá
18:00		Report	Moreno 29'; Candelo 65'	Stadium: Estadio El Campín; Attendance: 16,004; Referee: Carlos Betancur

1 August 3	Atlético Nacional	0–0	Patriotas	Medellín
20:00		Report		Stadium: Estadio Atanasio Girardot; Attendance: 15,000; Referee: Carlos Ortega

12 August 4	Atlético Nacional	1–1	Millonarios	Medellín
19:30	Moreno 67'	Report	Marrugo 86'	Stadium: Estadio Atanasio Girardot; Attendance: 21,433; Referee: Alexander Ospina

18 August 5	América de Cali	0–2	Atlético Nacional	Cali
17:30		Report	Moreno 8'; Henríquez 20'	Stadium: Estadio Pascual Guerrero; Attendance: 8,500; Referee: Nicolás Gallo

24 August 6	Atlético Nacional	3–2	Alianza Petrolera	Medellín
20:00	Duarte 12'; Moreno 19', 52'	Report	Palomeque 19'; Arias 90+1'	Stadium: Estadio Atanasio Girardot; Attendance: 13,766; Referee: Nicolás Rodríguez

2 September 7	Jaguares	1–1	Atlético Nacional	Montería
18:00	Duarte 26' (o.g.)	Report	Lucumí 80'	Stadium: Estadio Jaraguay; Attendance: 8,000; Referee: Mario Herrera

5 September 8	Atlético Nacional	2–3	Atlético Bucaramanga	Medellín
20:30	Castellani 9'; Moreno 50' (pen.)	Report	Vallecilla 20'; Rangel 38', 90+5'	Stadium: Estadio Atanasio Girardot; Attendance: 10,322; Referee: Jorge Guzmán

9 September 9	Deportivo Pasto	0–2	Atlético Nacional	Pasto
17:30		Report	Moreno 27' (pen.); Lucumí 65'	Stadium: Estadio Departamental Libertad; Attendance: 10,000; Referee: Heider Castro

16 September 10	Atlético Nacional	3–1	Envigado	Medellín
20:00	G. Torres 20', 90+3'; Ha. Palacios 76'	Report	Moreno 24'	Stadium: Estadio Atanasio Girardot; Attendance: 14,114; Referee: Nolberto Ararat

23 September 11	Atlético Huila	1–0	Atlético Nacional	Neiva
19:30	Amaya 79'	Report		Stadium: Estadio Guillermo Plazas Alcid; Attendance: 1,500; Referee: Carlos Betancur

30 September 12	Atlético Nacional	3–2	Boyacá Chicó	Medellín
17:30	G. Torres 5'; Moreno 69' (pen.); Henríquez 90+1'	Report	Valdés 18', 55'	Stadium: Estadio Atanasio Girardot; Attendance: 13,955; Referee: Nicolás Gallo

6 October 13	Independiente Medellín	2–1	Atlético Nacional	Medellín
17:30	Cano 14' (pen.); Angulo 62'	Report	Moreno 89'	Stadium: Estadio Atanasio Girardot; Attendance: 29,929; Referee: Andrés Rojas

14 October 14	Atlético Nacional	0–0	Deportivo Cali	Medellín
17:15		Report		Stadium: Estadio Atanasio Girardot; Attendance: 19,140; Referee: Mario Herrera

18 October 15	Rionegro Águilas	1–3	Atlético Nacional	Rionegro
20:00	Toloza 79' (pen.)	Report	Hernández 35'; Duarte 58' (pen.); Ayala 75' (o.g.)	Stadium: Estadio Alberto Grisales; Attendance: 3,000; Referee: Ricardo García

21 October 16	Atlético Nacional	1–0	Junior	Medellín
17:15	He. Palacios 53'	Report		Stadium: Estadio Atanasio Girardot; Attendance: 22,000; Referee: John Hinestroza

27 October 17	Once Caldas	2–0	Atlético Nacional	Manizales
20:00	Rodríguez 7'; Braghieri 64' (o.g.)	Report		Stadium: Estadio Palogrande; Attendance: 12,549; Referee: Luis Sánchez

5 November 18	Atlético Nacional	0–0	La Equidad	Medellín
20:00		Report		Stadium: Estadio Atanasio Girardot; Attendance: 21,593; Referee: Edilson Ariza

11 November 19	Leones	2–2	Atlético Nacional	Itagüí
17:30	Mantilla 16'; Mena 65' (pen.)	Report	A. Ramírez 69'; Lucumí 90+6' (pen.)	Stadium: Estadio Metropolitano Ciudad de Itagüí; Referee: Carlos Ortega

=== Copa Libertadores ===
==== Group stage ====
Pos	Team	Pld	W	D	L	GF	GA	GD	Pts	Qualification	ATN	CCL	BOL	DEL
1	(Colombia) Atlético Nacional	6	3	1	2	9	3	+6	10	Round of 16	—	0–0	4–1	4–0
2	(Chile) Colo-Colo	6	2	2	2	5	5	0	8	Round of 16	0–1	—	2–0	0–2
3	(Bolivia) Bolívar	6	2	2	2	6	9	−3	8	Copa Sudamericana	1–0	1–1	—	2–1
4	(Ecuador) Delfín	6	2	1	3	6	9	−3	7		1–0	1–2	1–1	—

Source: CONMEBOL

Match won	Match drawn	Match lost

27 February 2018 1	Colo-Colo (Chile)	0–1	(Colombia) Atlético Nacional	Santiago, Chile
21:30 UTC−3		Report	Hernández 66'	Stadium: Estadio Monumental; Attendance: 42,111; Referee: Wilton Sampaio (Brazil)

14 March 2018 2	Atlético Nacional (Colombia)	4–0	(Ecuador) Delfín	Medellín, Colombia
19:45 UTC−5	Moreno 31' (pen.); Lenis 46', 56'; M. Torres 52'	Report		Stadium: Estadio Atanasio Girardot; Attendance: 30,578; Referee: Diego Haro (Peru)

5 April 2018 3	Bolívar (Bolivia)	1–0	(Colombia) Atlético Nacional	La Paz, Bolivia
20:30 UTC−4	Riquelme 37'	Report		Stadium: Estadio Hernando Siles; Attendance: 24,700; Referee: Néstor Pitana (Argentina)

24 April 2018 4	Atlético Nacional (Colombia)	4–1	(Bolivia) Bolívar	Medellín, Colombia
19:30 UTC−5	Castellani 12'; Hernández 31'; Moreno 33', 65'	Report	Riquelme 48'	Stadium: Estadio Atanasio Girardot; Referee: Raphael Claus (Brazil)

15 May 2018 5	Delfín (Ecuador)	1–0	(Colombia) Atlético Nacional	Manta, Ecuador
17:15 UTC−5	Chicaiza 19'	Report		Stadium: Estadio Jocay; Referee: Víctor Carrillo (Peru)

24 May 2018 6	Atlético Nacional (Colombia)	0–0	(Chile) Colo-Colo	Medellín, Colombia
19:30 UTC−5		Report		Stadium: Estadio Atanasio Girardot; Referee: Néstor Pitana (Argentina)

==== Final stages ====
===== Round of 16 =====
9 August 2018 First leg	Atlético Tucumán (Argentina)	2–0	(Colombia) Atlético Nacional	Tucumán, Argentina
21:45 UTC−3	Díaz 7'; Acosta 70'	Report		Stadium: Estadio Monumental José Fierro; Referee: Éber Aquino (Paraguay)

28 August 2018 Second leg	Atlético Nacional (Colombia)	1–0	(Argentina) Atlético Tucumán	Medellín, Colombia
19:45 UTC−5	Duarte 11'	Report		Stadium: Estadio Atanasio Girardot; Attendance: 25,363; Referee: Roberto Tobar (Chile)

=== Copa Colombia ===
==== Round of 16 ====
15 August First leg	Atlético Nacional	1–0	Patriotas	Medellín
19:30	Rivas 82'	Report		Stadium: Estadio Atanasio Girardot; Attendance: 11,607; Referee: Jorge Duarte

21 August Second leg	Patriotas	0–1	Atlético Nacional	Tunja
19:30		Report	Lucumí 83'	Stadium: Estadio La Independencia; Referee: Andrés Rojas

==== Quarterfinals ====
13 September First leg	Atlético Nacional	1–0	Junior	Medellín
19:45	Bocanegra 53'	Report		Stadium: Estadio Atanasio Girardot; Attendance: 8,842; Referee: Gustavo Murillo

19 September Second leg	Junior	0–0	Atlético Nacional	Barranquilla
19:30		Report		Stadium: Estadio Metropolitano Roberto Meléndez; Referee: Mario Herrera

==== Semifinals ====
3 October First leg	Leones	0–1	Atlético Nacional	Itagüí
19:30		Report	Moreno 4'	Stadium: Metropolitano Ciudad de Itagüí; Referee: John Hinestroza

11 October Second leg	Atlético Nacional	3–1	Leones	Medellín
19:45	Moreno 28'; Rivas 50'; J. Ramírez 79'	Report	Otero 73'	Stadium: Estadio Atanasio Girardot; Attendance: 7,986; Referee: Luis Sánchez

==== Finals ====
24 October First leg	Once Caldas	2–2	Atlético Nacional	Manizales
19:00	Steer 41', 48'	Report	A. Ramírez 31', 78'	Stadium: Estadio Palogrande; Attendance: 29,308; Referee: Carlos Betancur

1 November Second leg	Atlético Nacional	2–1	Once Caldas	Medellín
19:00	Hernández 45+2'; Bocanegra 90+1'	Report	Carbonero 75'	Stadium: Estadio Atanasio Girardot; Referee: Mario Herrera

=== Superliga Colombiana ===
31 January First leg	Millonarios	0–0	Atlético Nacional	Bogotá
19:05		Report		Stadium: Estadio El Campín; Attendance: 14,898; Referee: John Hinestroza

7 February Second leg	Atlético Nacional	1–2	Millonarios	Medellín
19:25	Rentería 21'	Report	Ovelar 34', 54'	Stadium: Estadio Atanasio Girardot; Attendance: 42,560; Referee: Gustavo Murillo

== Statistics ==
=== Squad statistics ===
No.	Pos.	Nat.	Player	LA	LG	CA	CG	IA	IG	TA	TG	PM	Yellow card	Red card	Updated
1	GK	(Argentina)	Fernando Monetti	3	0	1	0	0	0	4	0	360	1	0	21 February 2018
25	GK	(Colombia)	Christian Vargas	1	0	1	0	0	0	2	0	180	2	0	21 February 2018
2	DF	(Colombia)	Daniel Bocanegra	2	0	0	0	0	0	2	0	168	0	0	21 February 2018
3	DF	(Colombia)	Felipe Aguilar	4	0	0	0	0	0	4	0	316	1	0	21 February 2018
4	DF	(Argentina)	Diego Braghieri	2	0	2	0	0	0	4	0	296	2	0	21 February 2018
12	DF	(Colombia)	Alexis Henríquez	3	0	2	0	0	0	5	0	358	0	0	21 February 2018
13	DF	(Colombia)	Helibelton Palacios	3	0	2	0	0	0	5	0	372	0	0	21 February 2018
23	DF	(Colombia)	Edwin Velasco	0	0	1	0	0	0	1	0	64	0	0	21 February 2018
26	DF	(Colombia)	Carlos Cuesta	1	0	2	0	0	0	3	0	270	0	0	21 February 2018
28	DF	(Argentina)	Rafael Delgado	2	0	0	0	0	0	2	0	124	0	0	21 February 2018
32	DF	(Colombia)	Christian Mafla	3	0	0	0	0	0	3	0	192	1	0	21 February 2018
6	MF	(Colombia)	Raúl Loaiza	2	0	1	0	0	0	3	0	185	1	0	21 February 2018
7	MF	(Colombia)	Gustavo Torres	2	0	2	0	0	0	4	0	109	0	0	21 February 2018
8	MF	(Colombia)	Diego Arias	3	0	1	0	0	0	4	0	269	0	0	21 February 2018
10	MF	(Colombia)	Macnelly Torres	3	0	0	0	0	0	3	0	216	1	0	21 February 2018
20	MF	(Colombia)	Jeison Lucumí	4	0	2	0	0	0	6	0	463	2	0	21 February 2018
21	MF	(Colombia)	Jorman Campuzano	1	0	2	0	0	0	3	0	217	2	1	21 February 2018
27	MF	(Argentina)	Gonzalo Castellani	4	0	2	0	0	0	6	0	382	0	0	21 February 2018
29	MF	(Colombia)	Aldo Leão Ramírez	2	0	1	0	0	0	3	0	216	1	0	21 February 2018
11	FW	(Colombia)	Andrés Rentería	4	2	2	1	0	0	6	3	472	1	0	21 February 2018
16	FW	(Colombia)	Vladimir Hernández	3	0	1	0	0	0	4	0	264	0	0	21 February 2018
17	FW	(Colombia)	Dayro Moreno	4	2	2	0	0	0	6	2	447	0	0	21 February 2018

International cup: Copa Libertadores
Source: Soccerway

=== Goals ===
R	Pos	Player	App	G	Pen	Avg	Updated
1st	FW	(Colombia) Dayro Moreno	8	5	2	0.63	30 March 2018
2nd	FW	(Colombia) Andrés Rentería	12	4	0	0.33	30 March 2018
3rd	MF	(Colombia) Reinaldo Lenis	6	3	0	0.5	30 March 2018
4th	MF	(Colombia) Vladimir Hernández	10	3	0	0.3	30 March 2018
5th	FW	(Colombia) Gustavo Torres	8	2	2	0.25	30 March 2018
6th	MF	(Colombia) Aldo Leão Ramírez	9	2	0	0.22	30 March 2018
7th	MF	(Colombia) Macnelly Torres	8	1	0	0.13	30 March 2018

Source: Soccerway

=== Disciplinary record ===
N	Pos.	Nat.	Name	Yellow card	Second yellow card	Red card	Notes
1	GK	(Argentina)	Fernando Monetti	1	0	0	
25	GK	(Colombia)	Christian Vargas	2	0	0	
2	DF	(Colombia)	Daniel Bocanegra	1	0	0	
3	DF	(Colombia)	Felipe Aguilar	3	0	0	
4	DF	(Argentina)	Diego Braghieri	4	0	0	
12	DF	(Colombia)	Alexis Henríquez	1	0	0	
13	DF	(Colombia)	Helibelton Palacios	1	0	0	
28	DF	(Argentina)	Rafael Delgado	1	0	0	
32	DF	(Colombia)	Christian Mafla	1	0	0	
6	MF	(Colombia)	Raúl Loaiza	1	0	0	
10	MF	(Colombia)	Macnelly Torres	1	0	0	
16	MF	(Colombia)	Vladimir Hernández	1	0	0	
21	MF	(Colombia)	Jorman Campuzano	4	1	0	
21	MF	(Argentina)	Gonzalo Castellani	2	0	0	
29	MF	(Colombia)	Aldo Leão Ramírez	1	0	0	
11	FW	(Colombia)	Andrés Rentería	2	0	0	
20	FW	(Colombia)	Jeison Lucumí	3	0	0	

Last updated: 30 March
Source: Soccerway
Only competitive matches
(yellow card) = Number of bookings; (second yellow card) = Number of sending offs after a second yellow card; (red card) = Number of sending offs by a direct red card.
