= 2017 Atlético Nacional season =

Atlético Nacional
2017 season
- Chairman: Juan Carlos de La Cuesta (until 31 March); Andrés Botero Phillipsbourne (since 1 April)
- Manager: Reinaldo Rueda (until 20 June); Juan Manuel Lillo (since 21 June)
- Stadium: Atanasio Girardot
- Categoría Primera A: Apertura: Champions; Finalización: Quarterfinals
- Copa Colombia: Quarterfinals
- Copa Libertadores: Group stage
- Recopa Sudamericana: Winners
- Top goalscorer: League: Dayro Moreno (25 goals); All: Dayro Moreno (33 goals)
- Highest home attendance: 44,189 (v. Deportivo Cali)
- Lowest home attendance: 11,042 (v. Cortuluá)
Home colours	Away colours

The 2017 Atlético Nacional season was the 70th season in the club's history. During this season, the team took part in four competitions: Categoría Primera A, Copa Colombia, Copa Libertadores, and Recopa Sudamericana.

== Players ==
=== First-team squad ===
As of 30 July 2017

Note: Flags indicate national team as defined under FIFA eligibility rules; some limited exceptions apply. Players may hold more than one non-FIFA nationality.

No.	Pos.	Nation	Player
2	DF	COL	Daniel Bocanegra
3	DF	COL	Felipe Aguilar
4	DF	ESP	Gorka Elustondo
5	DF	COL	Andrés Perea
6	MF	COL	Raúl Loaiza
7	MF	COL	Gustavo Torres
8	MF	COL	Diego Arias
9	FW	COL	Luis Carlos Ruiz
10	MF	COL	Macnelly Torres
11	FW	COL	Andrés Rentería (on loan from Querétaro)
12	DF	COL	Alexis Henríquez
15	MF	COL	Juan Pablo Nieto
16	MF	VEN	Ronaldo Lucena
17	FW	COL	Dayro Moreno (on loan from Tijuana)
18	DF	COL	Rodin Quiñónes

No.	Pos.	Nation	Player
19	DF	COL	Jackson Montaño (on loan from Deportes Quindío)
20	MF	COL	Jeison Lucumí
21	MF	COL	Jhon Mosquera
23	DF	COL	Edwin Velasco
25	GK	COL	Christian Vargas
26	DF	COL	Carlos Cuesta
27	MF	COL	Edwin Valencia
29	MF	COL	Aldo Leão Ramírez (on loan from Atlas)
30	FW	COL	Arley Rodríguez
32	DF	COL	Christian Mafla
33	FW	COL	Hadier Borja
34	GK	ARG	Franco Armani
35	DF	COL	Ezequiel Palomeque
–	DF	PAN	Roderick Miller

=== Out on loan ===
Note: Flags indicate national team as defined under FIFA eligibility rules; some limited exceptions apply. Players may hold more than one non-FIFA nationality.

No.	Pos.	Nation	Player
1	GK	COL	Cristian Bonilla (at La Equidad)
–	GK	COL	Camilo Vargas (at Deportivo Cali)
–	DF	COL	Cristian Cassiani (at Leones)
–	DF	COL	José Luis García (at Real Santander)
–	DF	COL	Tomás Maya (at Leones)
–	DF	COL	Esteban Morales (at Bogotá)

No.	Pos.	Nation	Player
–	DF	COL	Jeisson Palacios (at Atlético Bucaramanga)
–	MF	COL	Sherman Cárdenas (at LDU Quito)
–	MF	COL	Julián Mendoza (at Real Cartagena)
–	MF	COL	Juan Pablo Ramírez (at Deportivo Pasto)
–	MF	COL	John Henry Sánchez (at Leones)
–	FW	ARG	Ezequiel Rescaldani (at Huesca)

== Transfers ==
Source: Soccerway

=== In ===
Pos.	Name	Age	Moving from	Type	Date
MF	(Colombia) Raúl Loaiza	23	(Colombia) Patriotas	Transfer	30 July 2017
MF	(Venezuela) Ronaldo Lucena	20	(Venezuela) Zamora	Transfer	30 July 2017
MF	(Colombia) Jeison Lucumí	22	(Colombia) América de Cali	Transfer	25 July 2017
FW	(Colombia) Andrés Rentería	24	(Mexico) Querétaro	Loan	19 July 2017
DF	(Spain) Gorka Elustondo	30	(Spain) Athletic Club	Transfer	18 July 2017
MF	(Colombia) Sherman Cárdenas	27	(Brazil) Vitória	Loan return	4 July 2017
DF	(Colombia) Jackson Montaño	24	(Colombia) Deportes Quindío	Loan	18 June 2017
DF	(Colombia) Christian Mafla	24	(Colombia) Atlético Bucaramanga	Transfer	18 June 2017
MF	(Colombia) Gustavo Torres	21	(Colombia) Deportes Quindío	Transfer	18 June 2017
DF	(Colombia) Ezequiel Palomeque	24	(Colombia) Cortuluá	Transfer	17 February 2017
FW	(Colombia) Daniel Lloreda	26	(Colombia) Leones	Loan	17 February 2017
FW	(Colombia) Luis Carlos Ruiz	30	(Brazil) Sport Recife	Loan return	13 February 2017
MF	(Colombia) John Henry Sánchez	21	(Honduras) Olimpia	Loan return	7 February 2017
DF	(Colombia) Jeisson Palacios	22	(Colombia) Alianza Petrolera	Loan return	30 January 2017
MF	(Colombia) Aldo Leão Ramírez	35	(Mexico) Club Atlas	Loan	31 December 2016
FW	(Colombia) Dayro Moreno	31	(Mexico) Club Tijuana	Loan	31 December 2016
MF	(Colombia) Edwin Valencia	31	(Brazil) Santos	Transfer	31 December 2016
MF	(Argentina) Mariano Vásquez	24	(Colombia) Fortaleza	Transfer	31 December 2016
FW	(Paraguay) Oscar Franco	24	(Colombia) Fortaleza	Transfer	31 December 2016
MF	(Colombia) Víctor Cantillo	25	(Colombia) Leones	Loan return	31 December 2016

=== Out ===
Pos.	Name	Age	Moving to	Type	Date
FW	(Argentina) Ezequiel Rescaldani	25	(Spain) Huesca	Loan	1 August 2017
MF	(Colombia) Mateus Uribe	26	(Mexico) Club América	Transfer	30 July 2017
FW	(Colombia) Daniel Lloreda	27	(Colombia) Leones	Loan return	25 July 2017
FW	(Colombia) Leonardo Acevedo	21	(Portugal) Sporting CP	Transfer	23 July 2017
FW	(Colombia) Andrés Ibargüen	25	(Argentina) Racing	Transfer	20 July 2017
FW	(Colombia) Cristián Dajome	23	(Colombia) Deportivo Pasto	Transfer	17 July 2017
MF	(Colombia) Elkin Blanco	28	(Colombia) América de Cali	Transfer	10 July 2017
MF	(Colombia) Sherman Cárdenas	27	(Ecuador) LDU Quito	Loan	5 July 2017
FW	(Paraguay) Oscar Franco	24	(Paraguay) Independiente FBC	Transfer	30 June 2017
MF	(Colombia) Juan Pablo Ramírez	19	(Colombia) Deportivo Pasto	Loan	30 June 2017
MF	(Argentina) Mariano Vásquez	24	(Colombia) Deportes Tolima	Transfer	30 June 2017
GK	(Colombia) Cristian Bonilla	24	(Colombia) La Equidad	Loan	24 June 2017
DF	(Colombia) Farid Díaz	33	(Paraguay) Club Olimpia	Transfer	24 June 2017
DF	(Colombia) Francisco Nájera	33	(Colombia) La Equidad	Transfer	24 June 2017
DF	(Colombia) Alejandro Bernal	29	(Colombia) América de Cali	Transfer	18 June 2017
DF	(Colombia) Federico Arbeláez	20	(Colombia) Llaneros	Transfer	28 February 2017
FW	(Colombia) Miguel Borja	24	(Brazil) Palmeiras	Transfer	8 February 2017
FW	(Colombia) Sebastián Támara	20	(Colombia) Leones	Loan	8 February 2017
MF	(Colombia) John Henry Sánchez	21	(Colombia) Leones	Loan	8 February 2017
FW	(Colombia) Orlando Berrío	25	(Brazil) Flamengo	Transfer	27 January 2017
DF	(Colombia) Gilberto García	30	(Colombia) Once Caldas	Transfer	31 January 2017
DF	(Colombia) Jeisson Palacios	22	(Colombia) Atlético Bucaramanga	Loan	31 January 2017
DF	(Colombia) Tomás Maya	20	(Colombia) Leones	Loan	19 January 2017
MF	(Colombia) Víctor Cantillo	25	(Colombia) Deportivo Pasto	Transfer	31 December 2016
MF	(Venezuela) Alejandro Guerra	31	(Brazil) Palmeiras	Transfer	31 December 2016
GK	(Colombia) Luis Martínez	34	(Colombia) América de Cali	Transfer	31 December 2016
DF	(Colombia) Juan Guillermo Arboleda	27	(Colombia) Deportes Tolima	Transfer	31 December 2016

== Pre-season and friendlies ==
Match won	Match drawn	Match lost

19 January Friendly	Atlético Nacional (Colombia)	2–0	(Colombia) Atlético Nacional B	Guarne, Colombia
08:30	Rescaldani 17'; Bernal 65'			Stadium: Guarne stadium

22 January Friendly	Atlético Nacional (Colombia)	0–2	(Venezuela) Carabobo	Guarne, Colombia
08:30			Ocanto 28'; 32' (o.g.)	Stadium: Guarne stadium

22 January Friendly	Atlético Nacional (Colombia)	2–1	(Venezuela) Carabobo	Guarne, Colombia
10:00	Franco 48'; Dajome 54' (pen.)		Cova 43'	Stadium: Guarne stadium

25 January Friendly	Atlético Nacional (Colombia)	0–0	(Colombia) Itagüí Leones	Guarne, Colombia
08:30				Stadium: Guarne stadium

25 January Friendly	Atlético Nacional (Colombia)	0–2	(Colombia) Itagüí Leones	Guarne, Colombia
10:30			Muñoz 49'; Lloreda 54'	Stadium: Guarne stadium

28 January Friendly	Atlético Nacional (Colombia)	1–0	(Colombia) Envigado	Guarne, Colombia
08:30	Henríquez 85'			Stadium: Guarne stadium

28 January Friendly	Atlético Nacional (Colombia)	2–2	(Colombia) Envigado	Guarne, Colombia
10:30	Moreno (??)		Gregori (??); M. López (??)	Stadium: Guarne stadium

6 July Friendly	Atlético Nacional (Colombia)	5–3	(Colombia) Itagüí Leones	Guarne, Colombia
	Ramírez (??); Ruiz (??); Moreno (??); G. Torres (??)			Stadium: Guarne stadium

3 September Friendly	Guadalajara (Mexico)	0–2	(Colombia) Atlético Nacional	Harrison, New Jersey, USA
			Ruiz 58'; Moreno 82' (pen.)	Stadium: Red Bull Arena

== Competitions ==
=== Overall ===
Competition	Started round	Final position / round	First match	Last match
Categoría Primera A Torneo Apertura	Matchday 1	Winners	9 February	18 June
Copa Libertadores	Group stage	4th (Group 1)	14 March	25 May
Categoría Primera A Torneo Finalización	Matchday 1	Quarterfinals	9 July	3 December
Copa Colombia	Round of 16	Quarterfinals	13 July	30 August
Recopa Sudamericana	Final	Winners	4 April	10 May

Updated to match played 31 August 2017
Source: Competitions

=== Categoría Primera A ===
==== Torneo Apertura ====
Pos	Team	Pld	W	D	L	GF	GA	GD	Pts	Qualification
1	Atlético Nacional	20	15	4	1	33	9	+24	49	Advanced to the knockout phase
2	Independiente Medellín	20	13	3	4	35	23	+12	42	Advanced to the knockout phase
3	Deportivo Pasto	20	10	5	5	31	20	+11	35	Advanced to the knockout phase
4	Millonarios	20	10	3	7	29	17	+12	33	Advanced to the knockout phase
5	Jaguares	20	8	7	5	18	16	+2	31	Advanced to the knockout phase

Source: Dimayor, Soccerway
Rules for classification: 1) Points, 2) Goal difference, 3) Goals for, 4) Away goals for, 5) Away goals against, 6) Drawing of lots

Note: For a complete table see the main article

===== Home-away summary =====
Home
Pos	Team	Pld	W	D	L	GF	GA	GD	Pts
1	Atlético Nacional	10	8	2	0	18	4	+14	26

Away
Pos	Team	Pld	W	D	L	GF	GA	GD	Pts
1	Atlético Nacional	10	7	2	1	15	5	+10	23

===== Match results =====
Match won	Match drawn	Match lost

9 February 2	Atlético Bucaramanga	0–1	Atlético Nacional	Floridablanca
20:00		Report	Bernal 55'	Stadium: Estadio Álvaro Gómez Hurtado; Attendance: 10,000; Referee: Harold Perilla

12 February 3	Atlético Nacional	3–0	Rionegro Águilas	Medellín
19:30	Moreno 37', 67'; M. Torres 55'	Report		Stadium: Estadio Atanasio Girardot; Attendance: 28,585; Referee: Luis Sánchez

18 February 4	Deportes Tolima	0–0	Atlético Nacional	Ibagué
20:00		Report		Stadium: Estadio Manuel Murillo Toro; Attendance: 15,000; Referee: Juan Pontón

25 February 6	La Equidad	0–2	Atlético Nacional	Bogotá
19:45		Report	Moreno 13'; Uribe 87'	Stadium: Estadio El Campín; Attendance: 31,703; Referee: Nicolás Gallo

2 March 7	Atlético Nacional	2–0	Jaguares	Medellín
20:00	Moreno 2'; Uribe 26'	Report		Stadium: Estadio Atanasio Girardot; Attendance: 23,000; Referee: Hervin Otero

5 March 8	América de Cali	0–0	Atlético Nacional	Cali
17:15		Report		Stadium: Estadio Olímpico Pascual Guerrero; Attendance: 38,648; Referee: Andrés Rojas

11 March 9	Alianza Petrolera	1–5	Atlético Nacional	Barrancabermeja
18:00	Arias 20'	Report	Ibargüen 7'; Lloreda 25'; Ramírez 32'; Dajome 69', 83'	Stadium: Estadio Daniel Villa Zapata; Attendance: 7,000; Referee: Jorge Guzmán

18 March 10	Atlético Nacional	3–1	Independiente Medellín	Medellín
19:45	Ruiz 2', 6'; Moreno 90+2'	Report	Quintero 13'	Stadium: Estadio Atanasio Girardot; Attendance: 40,116; Referee: Wilson Lamouroux

29 March 1^{†}	Atlético Nacional	3–1	Santa Fe	Medellín
18:00	Ruiz 15'; Bernal 19'; Rodríguez 81'	Report	Plata 87'	Stadium: Estadio Atanasio Girardot; Attendance: 21,624; Referee: Luis Sánchez

31 March 11	Atlético Nacional	2–1	Deportivo Pasto	Medellín
20:15	Franco 71'; Uribe 78'	Report	Hinestroza 44'	Stadium: Estadio Atanasio Girardot; Attendance: 20,862; Referee: Carlos Betancur

7 April 12	Millonarios	0–1	Atlético Nacional	Bogotá
20:00		Report	Ramírez 88'	Stadium: Estadio El Campín; Attendance: 37,000; Referee: Jorge Guzmán

16 April 13	Atlético Nacional	2–0	Envigado	Medellín
20:00	Rodríguez 3'; Uribe 40'	Report		Stadium: Estadio Atanasio Girardot; Attendance: 16,203; Referee: Ricardo García

23 April 14	Atlético Huila	0–1	Atlético Nacional	Neiva
15:15		Report	Rodríguez 19'	Stadium: Estadio Guillermo Plazas Alcid; Attendance: 1,800; Referee: Leevan Suárez

26 April 5^{†}	Atlético Nacional	2–1	Junior	Medellín
20:00	Moreno 63' (pen.); Ibargüen 90+3'	Report	Pico 74'	Stadium: Estadio Atanasio Girardot; Attendance: 21,607; Referee: Andrés Rojas

29 April 15	Atlético Nacional	1–0	Once Caldas	Medellín
18:00	Moreno 90+15'	Report		Stadium: Estadio Atanasio Girardot; Attendance: 27,378; Referee: Jhon Hinestroza

6 May 16	Cortuluá	0–1	Atlético Nacional	Cali
18:00		Report	Rodríguez 79'	Stadium: Estadio Olímpico Pascual Guerrero; Attendance: 13,568; Referee: Éder Vergara

11 May 17	Atlético Nacional	0–0	Tigres	Medellín
20:00		Report		Stadium: Estadio Atanasio Girardot; Attendance: 11,457; Referee: Carlos Anaya

13 May 18	Patriotas	0–1	Atlético Nacional	Tunja
17:00		Report	Rodríguez 89' (pen.)	Stadium: Estadio La Independencia; Attendance: 5,000; Referee: Ricardo García

21 May 19	Atlético Nacional	0–0	Deportivo Cali	Medellín
17:15		Report		Stadium: Estadio Atanasio Girardot; Attendance: 23,389; Referee: Hervin Otero

27 May 20	Independiente Medellín	4–3	Atlético Nacional	Medellín
19:30	Mosquera 61'; Marrugo 65'; Quintero 78'; Valencia 89'	Report	Moreno 11', 82' (pen.); Quiñones 74'	Stadium: Estadio Atanasio Girardot; Attendance: 37,066; Referee: Adrián Vélez

†: Postponed matches.

Knockout phase

===== Quarterfinals =====
31 May First leg	Jaguares	1–3	Atlético Nacional	Montería
15:15	Vanegas 66'	Report	Moreno 29'; Quiñones 53'; M. Torres 70'	Stadium: Estadio Jaraguay; Attendance: 4,500; Referee: Andrés Rojas

3 June Second leg	Atlético Nacional	3–2	Jaguares	Medellín
20:15	Moreno 67', 90+3'; Rodríguez 74'	Report	Vanegas 16'; Steer 63'	Stadium: Estadio Atanasio Girardot; Attendance: 21,131; Referee: Gustavo Murillo

===== Semifinals =====
7 June First leg	Millonarios	0–0	Atlético Nacional	Bogotá
19:05		Report		Stadium: Estadio El Campín; Attendance: 21,750; Referee: Mario Herrera

11 June Second leg	Atlético Nacional	1–0	Millonarios	Medellín
19:30	Moreno 90+1'	Report		Stadium: Estadio Atanasio Girardot; Attendance: 38,251; Referee: Luis Sánchez

===== Finals =====
14 June First leg	Deportivo Cali	2–0	Atlético Nacional	Palmira
19:00	Mera 45'; Duque 65'	Report		Stadium: Estadio Deportivo Cali; Attendance: 22,868; Referee: Mario Herrera

18 June Second leg	Atlético Nacional	5–1	Deportivo Cali	Medellín
19:00	M. Torres 8'; Uribe 17'; Ibargüen 41'; Moreno 75' (pen.); Quiñónes 78'	Report	Duque 20'	Stadium: Estadio Atanasio Girardot; Attendance: 44,189; Referee: Andrés Rojas

==== Torneo Finalización ====
Pos	Team	Pld	W	D	L	GF	GA	GD	Pts	Qualification
1	Junior	20	12	3	5	32	15	+17	39	Advance to the knockout phase
2	Santa Fe	20	11	6	3	21	10	+11	39	Advance to the knockout phase
3	Atlético Nacional	20	12	2	6	25	12	+13	38	Advance to the knockout phase
4	Millonarios	20	10	6	4	26	14	+12	36	Advance to the knockout phase
5	Deportes Tolima	20	9	6	5	25	20	+5	33	Advance to the knockout phase

Source: Dimayor, Soccerway
Rules for classification: 1) Points, 2) Goal difference, 3) Goals for, 4) Away goals for, 5) Away goals against, 6) Drawing of lots

Note: For a complete table see the main article

===== Home-away summary =====
Home
Pos	Team	Pld	W	D	L	GF	GA	GD	Pts
1	Atlético Nacional	10	8	2	0	20	4	+16	26

Away
Pos	Team	Pld	W	D	L	GF	GA	GD	Pts
4	Atlético Nacional	10	4	0	6	5	8	−3	12

===== Match results =====
Match won	Match drawn	Match lost

9 July 1	Santa Fe	1–0	Atlético Nacional	Bogotá
19:30	Pajoy 51' (pen.)	Report		Stadium: Estadio El Campín; Attendance: 20,459; Referee: Jhon Hinestroza

16 July 2	Atlético Nacional	2–1	Atlético Bucaramanga	Medellín
19:45	Ruiz 15'; Moreno 90'	Report	Romero 58' (pen.)	Stadium: Estadio Atanasio Girardot; Attendance: 14,167; Referee: Hervin Otero

20 July 3	Rionegro Águilas	0–1	Atlético Nacional	Rionegro
18:10		Report	Ramírez 24'	Stadium: Estadio Alberto Grisales; Attendance: 7,000; Referee: Bismark Santiago

23 July 4	Atlético Nacional	1–0	Deportes Tolima	Medellín
17:15	Moreno 31'	Report		Stadium: Estadio Atanasio Girardot; Attendance: 16,833; Referee: Lisandro Castillo

30 July 5	Junior	2–0	Atlético Nacional	Barranquilla
16:00	Teo 27'; Barrera 84'	Report		Stadium: Estadio Metropolitano Roberto Meléndez; Attendance: 40,761; Referee: Andrés Rojas

9 August 6	Atlético Nacional	1–1	La Equidad	Medellín
17:15	Ruiz 44' (pen.)	Report	Valencia 54'	Stadium: Estadio Atanasio Girardot; Attendance: 12,263; Referee: Leevan Suárez

13 August 7	Jaguares	0–1	Atlético Nacional	Montería
15:30		Report	Rentería 53'	Stadium: Estadio Jaraguay; Attendance: 9,000; Referee: Hervin Otero

16 August 8	Atlético Nacional	2–0	América de Cali	Medellín
20:10	Angulo 33' (o.g.); Ramírez 81'	Report		Stadium: Estadio Atanasio Girardot; Attendance: 37,016; Referee: Gustavo Murillo

20 August 9	Atlético Nacional	4–0	Alianza Petrolera	Medellín
17:30	Moreno 4'; Lucumí 80'; Ruiz 88'; Nieto 90+3'	Report		Stadium: Estadio Atanasio Girardot; Attendance: 13,733; Referee: Nicolás Rodríguez

26 August 10	Independiente Medellín	1–0	Atlético Nacional	Medellín
19:45	Quintero 17'	Report		Stadium: Estadio Atanasio Girardot; Attendance: 31,636; Referee: Mario Herrera

16 September 12	Atlético Nacional	3–2	Millonarios	Medellín
19:45	Moreno 43' (pen.), 90+5'; Rentería 70'	Report	Núñez 39'; Del Valle 47'	Stadium: Estadio Atanasio Girardot; Attendance: 16,237; Referee: John Hinestroza

20 September 11^{†}	Deportivo Pasto	2–0	Atlético Nacional	Pasto
19:45	Reina 15' (pen.), 67'	Report		Stadium: Estadio Departamental Libertad; Attendance: 1,500; Referee: Carlos Betancur

24 September 13	Envigado	0–2	Atlético Nacional	Envigado
19:30		Report	Moreno 77', 90+4'	Stadium: Estadio Polideportivo Sur; Attendance: 3,506; Referee: Luis Sánchez

27 September 16	Atlético Nacional	3–0	Cortuluá	Medellín
18:00	Moreno 45', 90+1' (pen.); Rentería 66'	Report		Stadium: Estadio Atanasio Girardot; Attendance: 11,042; Referee: Alexander Ospina

30 September 14	Atlético Nacional	1–0	Atlético Huila	Medellín
18:00	Torres 83'	Report		Stadium: Estadio Atanasio Girardot; Attendance: 15,006; Referee: Nicolás Gallo

16 October 15	Once Caldas	0–1	Atlético Nacional	Manizales
19:45		Report	Lucumí 24'	Stadium: Estadio Palogrande; Attendance: 20,000; Referee: Andrés Rojas

31 October 18	Atlético Nacional	3–0	Patriotas	Medellín
20:00	Moreno 7'; Ramírez 58', 68'	Report		Stadium: Estadio Atanasio Girardot; Attendance: 11,313; Referee: Lisandro Castillo

5 November 19	Deportivo Cali	1–0	Atlético Nacional	Palmira
20:00	Benedetti 81'	Report		Stadium: Estadio Deportivo Cali; Attendance: 10,000; Referee: Hervin Otero

12 November 17^{†}	Tigres	1–0	Atlético Nacional	Bogotá
19:00	Lozano 54' (pen.)	Report		Stadium: Estadio El Campín; Referee: Jhon Ospina

18 November 20	Atlético Nacional	0–0	Independiente Medellín	Medellín
15:30		Report		Stadium: Estadio Atanasio Girardot; Attendance: 26,058; Referee: John Hinestroza

†: Postponed matches.

Knockout phase

===== Quarterfinals =====
26 November First leg	Deportes Tolima	1–0	Atlético Nacional	Ibagué
17:05	S. Mosquera 73'	Report		Stadium: Estadio Manuel Murillo Toro; Referee: Luis Sánchez

3 December Second leg	Atlético Nacional	2–1 (1–3 p)	Deportes Tolima	Medellín
19:45	Ruiz 46'; Moreno 51' (pen.)	Report	Pérez 56' (pen.)	Stadium: Estadio Atanasio Girardot; Attendance: 20,985; Referee: Bismark Santiago
	Penalties
	J. Mosquera (penalty missed); Bocanegra (penalty missed); Torres (penalty scored); Ruiz (penalty missed)		(penalty scored) S. Mosquera; (penalty scored) Lloreda; (penalty missed) Villa; (penalty scored) Rivas

=== Copa Colombia ===
Atlético Nacional qualified for the round of 16 after qualifying for the 2017 Copa Libertadores as titleholders.

==== Round of 16 ====
13 July First leg	Atlético Nacional	2–0	Atlético Huila	Medellín
19:30	Moreno 50', 52'	Report		Stadium: Estadio Atanasio Girardot; Referee: Nicolás Rodríguez

26 July Second leg	Atlético Huila	1–1	Atlético Nacional	Neiva
15:30	Almirón 58' (pen.)	Report	Sarmiento 29'	Stadium: Estadio Guillermo Plazas Alcid; Referee: Carlos Ortega

==== Quarterfinals ====
23 August First leg	Patriotas	3–2	Atlético Nacional	Tunja
20:00	Mosquera 11'; Gómez 50'; Ibargüen 82'	Report	Moreno 44'; Rentería 67'	Stadium: Estadio La Independencia; Referee: Carlos Ortega

30 August Second leg	Atlético Nacional	1–1	Patriotas	Medellín
19:30	Moreno 42' (pen.)	Report	Gómez 76'	Stadium: Estadio Atanasio Girardot; Referee: Nicolás Gallo

=== Copa Libertadores ===
==== Group stage ====
Pos	Team	Pld	W	D	L	GF	GA	GD	Pts	Qualification
1	(Brazil) Botafogo	6	3	1	2	6	5	+1	10	Round of 16
2	(Ecuador) Barcelona	6	3	1	2	8	8	0	10	Round of 16
3	(Argentina) Estudiantes	6	3	0	3	7	8	−1	9	Copa Sudamericana
4	(Colombia) Atlético Nacional	6	2	0	4	8	8	0	6	

Source: CONMEBOL

Match won	Match drawn	Match lost

14 March 1	Barcelona (Ecuador)	2–1	(Colombia) Atlético Nacional	Guayaquil
19:45 UTC−5	Álvez 24'; M. Caicedo 45'	Report	Mosquera 13'	Stadium: Estadio Monumental Isidro Romero Carbo; Attendance: 40,000; Referee: Julio Bascuñán (Chile)

13 April 2	Atlético Nacional (Colombia)	0–2	(Brazil) Botafogo	Medellín
19:45 UTC−5		Report	Camilo 38'; Guilherme 90+2'	Stadium: Estadio Atanasio Girardot; Referee: Ulises Mereles (Paraguay)

19 April 3	Estudiantes (Argentina)	1–0	(Colombia) Atlético Nacional	La Plata
19:30 UTC−3	Toledo 37'	Report		Stadium: Estadio Ciudad de La Plata; Referee: Andrés Cunha (Uruguay)

2 May 4	Atlético Nacional (Colombia)	4–1	(Argentina) Estudiantes	Medellín
19:00 UTC−5	Uribe 35'; Moreno 44'; Ibargüen 46'; M. Torres 68'	Report	Díaz 66' (o.g.)	Stadium: Estadio Atanasio Girardot; Referee: Diego Haro (Peru)

18 May 5	Botafogo (Brazil)	1–0	(Colombia) Atlético Nacional	Rio de Janeiro
21:45 UTC−3	Rodrigo Pimpão 50'			Stadium: Estádio Olímpico Nilton Santos; Referee: Víctor Carrillo (Peru)

25 May 6	Atlético Nacional (Colombia)	3–1	(Ecuador) Barcelona	Medellín
19:45 UTC−5	Moreno 18' (pen.); Arreaga 26' (o.g.); Aimar 67' (o.g.)	Report	Ayoví 3'	Stadium: Estadio Atanasio Girardot; Referee: Juan Nelio García (Bolivia)

=== Recopa Sudamericana ===
4 April First leg	Chapecoense (Brazil)	2–1	(Colombia) Atlético Nacional	Chapecó
19:15 UTC−3	Reinaldo 23' (pen.); Luiz Otávio 73'	Report	M. Torres 58'	Stadium: Arena Condá; Attendance: 19,005; Referee: Mario Díaz de Vivar (Paraguay)

10 May Second leg	Atlético Nacional (Colombia)	4–1	(Brazil) Chapecoense	Medellín
19:45 UTC−5	Moreno 1', 66'; Ibargüen 30', 79'	Report	Túlio de Melo 82'	Stadium: Estadio Atanasio Girardot; Attendance: 40,450; Referee: Roberto Tobar (Chile)

== Statistics ==
=== Squad statistics ===
No.	Pos.	Nat.	Player	LA	LG	CA	CG	IA	IG	TA	TG	PM	Yellow card	Red card	Updated
25	GK	(Colombia)	Christian Vargas	4	0	0	0	0	0	4	0	360	1	0	21 January 2018
34	GK	(Argentina)	Franco Armani	38	0	4	0	8	0	50	0	4,388	5	1	21 January 2018
	GK	(Colombia)	Camilo Vargas	1	0	0	0	0	0	1	0	20	0	0	21 January 2018
2	DF	(Colombia)	Daniel Bocanegra	31	0	3	0	7	0	41	0	3,397	11	0	21 January 2018
3	DF	(Colombia)	Felipe Aguilar	23	0	2	0	1	0	26	0	2,122	5	0	21 January 2018
4	DF	(Spain)	Gorka Elustondo	8	0	1	0	0	0	9	0	646	5	0	21 January 2018
4	DF	(Panama)	Roderick Miller	3	0	0	0	0	0	3	0	270	1	0	21 January 2018
12	DF	(Colombia)	Alexis Henríquez	33	0	4	0	6	0	43	0	3,719	18	1	21 January 2018
18	DF	(Colombia)	Rodin Quiñónes	21	3	2	0	1	0	24	3	1,615	3	0	21 January 2018
23	DF	(Colombia)	Edwin Velasco	22	0	1	0	1	0	24	0	1,721	6	1	21 January 2018
26	DF	(Colombia)	Carlos Cuesta	31	0	4	0	2	0	37	0	3,162	6	0	21 January 2018
32	DF	(Colombia)	Christian Mafla	3	0	1	0	0	0	4	0	297	1	0	21 January 2018
35	DF	(Colombia)	Ezequiel Palomeque	15	0	1	0	0	0	16	0	1,241	4	1	21 January 2018
5	MF	(Colombia)	Andrés Perea	2	0	1	0	0	0	3	0	39	1	0	21 January 2018
6	MF	(Colombia)	Raúl Loaiza	9	0	2	0	0	0	11	0	625	5	0	21 January 2018
7	MF	(Colombia)	Gustavo Torres	10	0	2	0	0	0	12	0	708	1	0	21 January 2018
8	MF	(Colombia)	Diego Arias	24	0	0	0	7	0	31	0	2,234	5	0	21 January 2018
10	MF	(Colombia)	Macnelly Torres	33	4	2	0	6	2	41	6	3,468	8	0	21 January 2018
13	MF	(Colombia)	Jean Lucas Rivera	0	0	1	0	0	0	1	0	35	0	0	21 January 2018
15	MF	(Colombia)	Juan Pablo Nieto	35	1	4	0	3	0	42	1	2,237	8	0	21 January 2018
20	MF	(Colombia)	Jeison Lucumí	16	2	2	0	0	0	18	2	1,113	1	0	21 January 2018
21	MF	(Colombia)	Jhon Mosquera	23	0	0	0	4	1	27	1	1,688	1	0	21 January 2018
27	MF	(Colombia)	Edwin Valencia	12	0	3	0	0	0	15	0	902	2	1	21 January 2018
27	MF	(Colombia)	Cristian Moya	1	0	0	0	0	0	1	0	0	0	0	21 January 2018
29	MF	(Colombia)	Aldo Leão Ramírez	37	6	4	0	7	0	48	6	3,199	6	1	21 January 2018
31	MF	(Colombia)	Dayron Mosquera	0	0	0	0	0	0	0	0	0	0	0	21 January 2018
32	MF	(Colombia)	David Josué Pérez	1	0	0	0	0	0	1	0	22	0	0	21 January 2018
9	FW	(Colombia)	Luis Carlos Ruiz	26	7	2	0	5	0	33	7	1,951	4	0	21 January 2018
11	FW	(Colombia)	Andrés Rentería	15	3	2	1	0	0	17	4	1,096	7	0	21 January 2018
16	MF	(Venezuela)	Ronaldo Lucena	5	0	0	0	0	0	5	0	121	1	0	21 January 2018
17	FW	(Colombia)	Dayro Moreno	38	25	3	4	7	4	48	33	4,046	5	1	21 January 2018
26	FW	(Colombia)	Andrés Sarmiento	2	0	1	1	0	0	3	1	99	0	0	21 January 2018
30	FW	(Colombia)	Arley Rodríguez	23	6	0	0	4	0	27	6	1,198	6	0	21 January 2018
33	FW	(Colombia)	Hadier Borja	10	0	2	0	0	0	12	0	813	2	0	21 January 2018
	GK	(Colombia)	Cristian Bonilla	6	0	0	0	0	0	6	0	540	1	0	21 January 2018
	DF	(Colombia)	Alejandro Bernal	10	2	0	0	4	0	14	2	921	3	0	21 January 2018
	DF	(Colombia)	Farid Díaz	15	0	0	0	6	0	21	0	1,778	5	0	21 January 2018
	DF	(Colombia)	Francisco Nájera	10	0	0	0	5	0	15	0	1,287	3	0	21 January 2018
	MF	(Colombia)	Elkin Blanco	17	0	0	0	3	0	20	0	1,409	9	0	21 January 2018
	MF	(Colombia)	Juan Pablo Ramírez	3	0	0	0	1	0	4	0	123	0	0	21 January 2018
	MF	(Colombia)	Mateus Uribe	17	5	0	0	2	1	19	6	1,504	3	1	21 January 2018
	MF	(Argentina)	Mariano Vásquez	7	0	0	0	0	0	7	0	311	2	0	21 January 2018
	FW	(Colombia)	Cristián Dajome	11	2	0	0	2	0	13	2	628	2	0	21 January 2018
	FW	(Paraguay)	Oscar Franco	6	1	0	0	0	0	6	1	220	2	0	21 January 2018
	FW	(Colombia)	Andrés Ibargüen	15	3	0	0	7	3	22	6	1,586	3	0	21 January 2018
	FW	(Colombia)	Daniel Lloreda	2	1	0	0	0	0	2	1	92	1	0	21 January 2018

International cup: Copa Libertadores
Source: Soccerway

=== Goals ===
R	Pos	Player	App	G	Pen	Avg	Updated
1st	FW	(Colombia) Dayro Moreno	48	33	10	0.69	21 January 2018
2nd	MF	(Colombia) Luis Carlos Ruiz	33	7	1	0.21	21 January 2018
3rd	MF	(Colombia) Mateus Uribe	19	6	0	0.32	21 January 2018
3rd	FW	(Colombia) Arley Rodríguez	27	6	1	0.22	21 January 2018
3rd	FW	(Colombia) Andrés Ibargüen	22	6	0	0.27	21 January 2018
3rd	MF	(Colombia) Macnelly Torres	41	6	0	0.15	21 January 2018
7th	MF	(Colombia) Aldo Ramírez	48	5	0	0.1	21 January 2018
8th	FW	(Colombia) Andrés Rentería	17	4	0	0.24	21 January 2018
9th	DF	(Colombia) Rodin Quiñónes	23	3	0	0.13	21 January 2018
10th	MF	(Colombia) Cristián Dajome	13	2	0	0.15	21 January 2018
10th	MF	(Colombia) Alejandro Bernal	14	2	0	0.14	21 January 2018
10th	MF	(Colombia) Jeison Lucumí	18	2	0	0.11	21 January 2018
13th	FW	(Colombia) Daniel Lloreda	2	1	0	0.5	21 January 2018
13th	FW	(Paraguay) Oscar Franco	6	1	0	0.17	21 January 2018
13th	MF	(Colombia) Jhon Mosquera	27	1	0	0.04	21 January 2018
13th	MF	(Colombia) Juan Pablo Nieto	36	1	0	0.03	21 January 2018

Source: Soccerway

=== Disciplinary record ===
N	Pos.	Nat.	Name	Yellow card	Second yellow card	Red card	Notes
12	DF	(Colombia)	Alexis Henríquez	18	0	1	
2	DF	(Colombia)	Daniel Bocanegra	11	0	0	
10	MF	(Colombia)	Macnelly Torres	9	0	0	
14	MF	(Colombia)	Elkin Blanco	9	0	0	
15	MF	(Colombia)	Juan Pablo Nieto	8	0	0	
23	DF	(Colombia)	Edwin Velasco	6	0	1	
29	MF	(Colombia)	Aldo Leão Ramírez	6	0	1	
11	FW	(Colombia)	Andrés Rentería	7	0	0	
1	GK	(Argentina)	Franco Armani	5	0	1	
17	FW	(Colombia)	Dayro Moreno	5	0	1	
26	DF	(Colombia)	Carlos Cuesta	6	0	0	
30	FW	(Colombia)	Arley Rodríguez	6	0	0	
35	DF	(Colombia)	Ezequiel Palomeque	4	1	0	
3	DF	(Colombia)	Felipe Aguilar	5	0	0	
4	MF	(Spain)	Gorka Elustondo	5	0	0	
6	MF	(Colombia)	Raúl Loaiza	5	0	0	
8	MF	(Colombia)	Diego Arias	5	0	0	
19	DF	(Colombia)	Farid Díaz	5	0	0	
6	MF	(Colombia)	Mateus Uribe	3	0	1	
9	FW	(Colombia)	Luis Carlos Ruiz	4	0	0	
5	DF	(Colombia)	Francisco Nájera	3	0	0	
11	FW	(Colombia)	Andrés Ibargüen	3	0	0	
18	DF	(Colombia)	Rodin Quiñónes	3	0	0	
20	MF	(Colombia)	Alejandro Bernal	3	0	0	
27	MF	(Colombia)	Edwin Valencia	2	0	1	
13	FW	(Paraguay)	Oscar Franco	2	0	0	
16	FW	(Colombia)	Cristián Dajome	2	0	0	
24	FW	(Argentina)	Mariano Vásquez	2	0	0	
33	FW	(Colombia)	Hadier Borja	2	0	0	
1	GK	(Colombia)	Cristian Bonilla	1	0	0	
4	DF	(Panama)	Roderick Miller	1	0	0	
5	MF	(Colombia)	Andrés Perea	1	0	0	
7	DF	(Colombia)	Gustavo Torres	1	0	0	
16	MF	(Venezuela)	Ronaldo Lucena	1	0	0	
20	MF	(Colombia)	Jeison Lucumí	1	0	0	
21	FW	(Colombia)	Jhon Mosquera	1	0	0	
32	DF	(Colombia)	Christian Mafla	1	0	0	
32	FW	(Colombia)	Daniel Lloreda	1	0	0	

Last updated: 21 January 2018
Source: Soccerway
Only competitive matches
(yellow card) = Number of bookings; (second yellow card) = Number of sending offs after a second yellow card; (red card) = Number of sending offs by a direct red card.
