= Jesús Orozco =

Jesús Orozco may refer to:

- Jesús Orozco (Venezuelan footballer) (born 2001)
- Jesús Orozco (Mexican footballer) (born 2002)
