= Juan Pablo Ramírez =

Colombian footballer (born 1997)

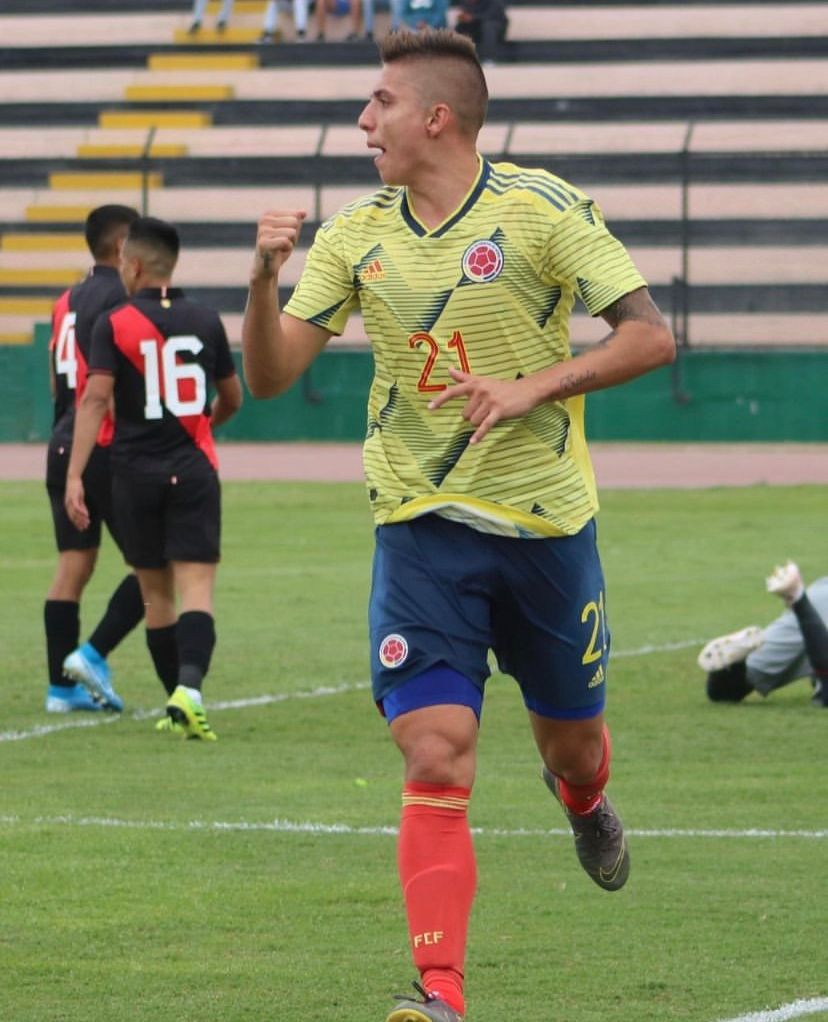
- Juan Pablo Ramirez

Personal information
- Full name: Juan Pablo Ramírez Velásquez
- Date of birth: 26 November 1997 (age 28)
- Place of birth: Rionegro, Colombia
- Height: 1.82 m (6 ft 0 in)
- Position: Attacking midfielder

Team information
- Current team: Avenida

Youth career
- Leones
- 2015–2016: Atlético Nacional

Senior career*
| Years | Team | Apps | (Gls) |
| 2014 | Leones | 4 | (0) |
| 2016–23 | Atlético Nacional | 48 | (4) |
| 2017 | → Deportivo Pasto (loan) | 10 | (1) |
| 2018 | → Itagüí Leones (loan) | 9 | (1) |
| 2020 | → Atlético Bucaramanga (loan) | 1 | (0) |
| 2020–2021 | → Bahia (loan) | 13 | (3) |
| 2022 | → América Mineiro (loan) | 22 | (2) |
| 2023 | → Qingdao West Coast (loan) | 24 | (9) |
| 2025 | Itagüí Leones | 4 | (1) |
| 2025–2026 | Anorthosis Famagusta | 1 | (0) |
| 2026– | Avenida | 5 | (1) |

International career
| 2017 | Colombia U20 | 6 | (0) |
- * Club domestic league appearances and goals as of 23 February 2026

Juan Pablo Ramírez Velásquez (26 November 1997) is a Colombian footballer who plays as an attacking midfielder for Avenida.

== Club career ==
Ramírez was born in Rionegro, and started his career with his hometown club Deportivo Rionegro (later renamed Leones FC). He made his first team debut for the side on 11 May 2014, starting in a 0–2 Categoría Primera B away loss against Real Santander.

After featuring regularly for Leones in the 2014 Copa Colombia, Ramírez moved to Atlético Nacional in 2015 and returned to the youth setup. Promoted to the main squad for the 2016 campaign, he made his Categoría Primera A debut on 9 June of that year by coming on as a late substitute for Macnelly Torres in a 1–1 draw at Atlético Junior.

Ramírez scored his first professional goal on 2 July 2016, netting his team's first in a 3–3 away draw against Alianza Petrolera. He could not establish himself as a regular starter for the Verdolagas, and subsequently served loans at Deportivo Pasto and former side Leones before being recalled by Atlético Nacional in July 2018.

In February 2020, Ramírez moved to Atlético Bucaramanga on loan for the season. On 9 November, still owned by Atlético Nacional, he joined Brazilian Série A side Bahia on loan until December 2021.

Shortly after arriving at his new club, Ramírez tested positive for COVID-19. After being fully recovered from the disease, he made his debut for Bahia on 9 December in a 2–3 home loss against Defensa y Justicia.

On 20 December 2020, Ramírez was accused of racism by Gerson during a 3–4 away loss against Flamengo; in that match, he also scored Bahia's first goal. Ramírez denied the claims, as the incident led to the dismissal of Bahia manager Mano Menezes, while Ramírez was immediately separated from the first team. After the club's internal analysis of the case, which stated that they could not find any evidence of racial injury, he was brought back to the first team shortly after.

On 22 March 2023, Ramírez joined China League One club Qingdao West Coast on loan from Atlético Nacional. At the end of 2023, it was confirmed that Ramírez returned to Atlético Nacional, albeit with a serious knee injury, a torn ACL.

== Career statistics ==
As of match played 23 February 2026

Appearances and goals by club, season and competition
| Club | Season | League | | | State League | | Cup | | Continental | | Other | | Total | |
| Club | Season | Division | Apps | Goals | Apps | Goals | Apps | Goals | Apps | Goals | Apps | Goals | Apps | Goals |
|---|---|---|---|---|---|---|---|---|---|---|---|---|---|---|
| Leones | 2014 | Categoría Primera B | 4 | 0 | — | | 7 | 0 | — | | — | | 11 | 0 |
| Atlético Nacional | 2016 | Categoría Primera A | 10 | 2 | — | | — | | 0 | 0 | — | | 10 | 2 |
| Atlético Nacional | 2017 | Categoría Primera A | 3 | 0 | — | | 0 | 0 | 1 (Note: Appearance(s) in Copa Libertadores) | 0 | — | | 4 | 0 |
| Atlético Nacional | 2018 | Categoría Primera A | 12 | 0 | — | | 1 | 1 | — | | — | | 13 | 1 |
| Atlético Nacional | 2019 | Categoría Primera A | 23 | 2 | — | | 0 | 0 | 5 (Note: Four appearances in Copa Libertadores, one appearance in Copa Sudamericana) | 0 | — | | 28 | 09 |
| Atlético Nacional | 2020 | Categoría Primera A | 0 | 0 | — | | 0 | 0 | — | | — | | 0 | 0 |
| Atlético Nacional | 2024 | Categoría Primera A | 0 | 0 | — | | 0 | 0 | 0 | 0 | — | | 0 | 0 |
| Atlético Nacional | Total | | 48 | 4 | — | | 1 | 1 | 6 | 0 | — | | 55 | 5 |
| Deportivo Pasto (loan) | 2017 | Categoría Primera A | 10 | 1 | — | | 1 | 0 | — | | — | | 11 | 1 |
| Itagüí Leones (loan) | 2018 | Categoría Primera A | 9 | 1 | — | | 1 | 0 | — | | — | | 10 | 1 |
| Atlético Bucaramanga (loan) | 2020 | Categoría Primera A | 1 | 0 | — | | 0 | 0 | — | | — | | 1 | 0 |
| Bahia (loan) | 2020 | Série A | 9 | 3 | — | | — | | 2 (Note: Appearance(s) in Copa Sudamericana) | 0 | 0 | 0 | 11 | 3 |
| Bahia (loan) | 2021 | Série A | 4 | 0 | 0 | 0 | 0 | 0 | — | | 0 | 0 | 4 | 0 |
| Bahia (loan) | Total | | 13 | 3 | 0 | 0 | 0 | 0 | 2 | 0 | 0 | 0 | 15 | 3 |
| América Mineiro (loan) | 2022 | Série A | 16 | 1 | 6 | 1 | 3 | 1 | — | | — | | 25 | 3 |
| Qingdao West Coast (loan) | 2023 | China League One | 24 | 9 | — | | 2 | 0 | — | | — | | 26 | 9 |
| Itagüí Leones | 2025 | Categoría Primera B | 4 | 1 | — | | 0 | 0 | — | | — | | 4 | 1 |
| Anorthosis Famagusta | 2025–26 | Cypriot First Division | 1 | 0 | — | | 1 | 0 | — | | — | | 2 | 0 |
| Avenida | 2026 | Gaúcho | — | | 5 | 1 | — | | — | | — | | 5 | 1 |
| Career total | | | 130 | 20 | 11 | 2 | 16 | 2 | 8 | 0 | 0 | 0 | 161 | 24 |

== Honours ==
Atlético Nacional

- Copa Colombia: 2016, 2018
- Recopa Sudamericana: 2017
- Copa Libertadores: 2016

Bahia

- Copa do Nordeste: 2021
