= Andrés Rentería =

Colombian footballer (born 1993)

Personal information
- Full name: Andrés Jair Rentería Morelo
- Date of birth: 6 March 1993 (age 33)
- Place of birth: Medellín, Colombia
- Height: 1.79 m (5 ft 10 in)
- Position: Winger

Team information
- Current team: Jaguares de Córdoba
- Number: 11

Youth career
- 2011–2012: Atlético Nacional

Senior career*
Years	Team	Apps	(Gls)
2012	Atlético Nacional	2	(0)
2012	→ Alianza Petrolera (loan)	21	(14)
2013–2016	Santos Laguna	103	(23)
2016–2017	Querétaro	12	(1)
2017–2018	→ Atlético Nacional (loan)	32	(6)
2018–2019	Cruz Azul	10	(2)
2019	→ San Lorenzo (loan)	4	(0)
2019–2020	→ Rionegro Águilas (loan)	27	(6)
2021–2022	Santa Fe	7	(1)
2022	Jaguares de Cordoba	28	(12)
2023	Deportes Tolima	8	(3)
2023	Alianza Petrolera	12	(2)
2024–2025	Alianza	25	(8)
2025–	Jaguares de Córdoba	38	(32)

International career
2013	Colombia U20	7	(2)
2015	Colombia	2	(1)
2016	Colombia Olympic	1	(0)
Medal record
Colombia
Runner-up	Toulon Tournament	2013
- * Club domestic league appearances and goals as of 3 December 2025

Andrés Jair Rentería Morelo (born 6 March 1993), commonly known as Andrés Rentería, is a Colombian footballer who plays as a forward for Jaguares de Córdoba.

== Club career ==
=== Atlético Nacional and Alianza Petrolera ===
Rentería started his career in Atlético Nacional's youth teams, and debuted in the first team on 4 March 2012, in the 1–0 defeat against Cúcuta Deportivo, coming on as an 81st-minute substitute for Diego Álvarez. He began his career as a centre forward, but eventually adopted its current position of winger.

On 30 June, he was loaned to Primera B club Alianza Petrolera. He debuted for the team on 28 July, in the 1–4 win against Uniautónoma, where he scored the 4 goals of his team. He would score 14 goals in 21 matches, becoming the season's top scorer, and helping to Alianza Petrolera achieve promotion to the Categoría Primera A, for the first time in their history.

=== Santos Laguna ===
On 11 December 2012, Rentería was sold to Liga MX club Santos Laguna. He debuted for the team on 20 January, in the 2–1 defeat against Puebla. Rentería would score his first goal on 12 May, in the 1–3 win against Atlas. On 5 November 2014, Santos won the Copa MX beating Puebla 4–2 in a penalty shootout, after a 2–2 draw. Rentería scored the opening goal of the match. On 21 July 2015, Santos Laguna won the 2015 Clausura of the Liga MX.

=== Querétaro ===
On 8 June 2016, Rentería joined Querétaro on a permanent transfer. On 2 November 2016, Querétaro beat Chivas 3–2 in a penalty shootout to win Copa MX, despite receiving a red card 7 minutes after being subbed in. On 16 July 2017, his team won the 2017 Supercopa MX.

=== Return to Atlético Nacional ===
On 22 July 2017, Rentería returned to Colombia rejoining Atlético Nacional on a one-year loan, with an option to buy for a $4 million fee.

=== Cruz Azul ===
On 16 June 2018, Cruz Azul announced the signing of Rentería. On July 21, 2018, he made his debut with Cruz Azul and scored his first goal in the 80th minute in a 3–0 victory against Puebla. In November 2018, he won Copa MX when Cruz Azul beat Monterrey 2–0 in the final.

==== Loans ====
On 28 January 2019 it was confirmed, that he would spend the rest of 2019 on loan at San Lorenzo, with an option to join permanently for a $3 million fee. His loan was terminated on 14 May 2019, due to his poor performance. On 18 July 2019, he joined Rionegro Águilas on loan until the end of the 2019 season. On 18 November, he returned to Cruz Azul after a disappointing loan spell. After failing to loan him with an option to buy, he returned on loan to Rionegro.

=== Later career ===
On 11 January 2021, Rentería joined Independiente Santa Fe. On 30 July 2021, he joined Jaguares de Córdoba. On 27 June 2022, he joined Deportes Tolima. On 14 July 2023, he rejoined Alianza Petrolera.

== International career ==
Rentería was called for the Colombia U20 squad of the 2013 Toulon Tournament. He played 4 matches, and scored a goal in the 80th minute of the 1–3 win against France U20.

He also was called for the squad that played the 2013 FIFA U-20 World Cup in Turkey, where he played 3 matches, and scored a goal in the 21st minute of the 0–3 win against El Salvador U-20.

On 22 March 2015 he was called up by Colombia national team for the friendlies against Bahrain and Kuwait. He made his international debut four days later, coming on as a second-half substitute for Radamel Falcao García, assisting Johan Mojica in the 79th minute and scoring in the 82nd, assisted by Mojica himself in a 6–0 win.

On 25 March 2016, Rentería made his debut for the Colombia Olympic football team in the 2016 Summer Olympics CONCACAF–CONMEBOL play-off. Subsequently, the team qualified to the 2016 Summer Olympics. He was left out of the roster for the 2016 Summer Olympics due to injury.

== Personal life ==
He is a naturalized citizen of Mexico.

== Career statistics ==
=== Club ===
As of 13 November 2023

Appearances and goals by club, season and competition
Club	Season	League			National Cup		Continental (Note: Appearances in CONCACAF Champions Cup and Copa Libertadores)		Other (Note: Appearances in Superliga Colombiana and Copa de la Superliga)		Total	
Club	Season	Division	Apps	Goals	Apps	Goals	Apps	Goals	Apps	Goals	Apps	Goals
Atlético Nacional	2012	Categoría Primera A	2	0	3	0	0	0	—		5	0
Alianza Petrolera	2012	Categoría Primera B	21	14	0	0	0	0	—		21	14
Santos Laguna	2012–13	Liga MX	13	2	0	0	1	0	—		14	2
Santos Laguna	2013–14	Liga MX	25	6	3	0	7	2	—		35	8
Santos Laguna	2014–15	Liga MX	38	11	14	7	0	0	—		52	18
Santos Laguna	2015–16	Liga MX	27	4	0	0	5	1	—		32	5
Santos Laguna	Total		103	23	17	7	13	3	0	0	133	33
Quéretaro	2016–17	Liga MX	12	1	7	1	0	0	—		19	2
Atlético Nacional	2017	Categoría Primera A	15	3	2	1	0	0	—		17	4
Atlético Nacional	2018	Categoría Primera A	17	3	0	0	4	0	2	1	23	4
Atlético Nacional	Total		32	6	2	1	4	0	2	1	40	8
Cruz Azul	2018–19	Liga MX	10	2	3	0	0	0	—		13	2
San Lorenzo	2018–19	Primera División	4	0	0	0	0	0	3	0	7	0
Águilas Doradas	2019	Categoría Primera A	12	2	1	1	0	0	—		13	3
Águilas Doradas	2020	Categoría Primera A	15	4	2	0	0	0	—		17	4
Águilas Doradas	Total		27	6	3	1	0	0	0	0	30	7
Independiente Santa Fé	2021	Categoría Primera A	7	1	0	0	1	0	—		8	1
Jaguares de Córdoba	2021	Categoría Primera A	15	6	1	0	0	0	—		16	6
Jaguares de Córdoba	2022	Categoría Primera A	13	6	0	0	0	0	—		13	6
Jaguares de Córdoba	Total		28	12	1	0	0	0	0	0	29	12
Deportes Tolima	2022	Categoría Primera A	6	2	1	0	0	0	—		7	2
Deportes Tolima	2023	Categoría Primera A	2	1	0	0	0	0	—		2	1
Deportes Tolima	Total		8	3	1	0	0	0	0	0	9	3
Alianza Petrolera	2023	Categoría Primera A	12	2	2	0	0	0	—		14	2
Career total			266	70	39	10	18	3	5	1	328	84

=== International ===
==== International appearances ====
===== Under-20 =====
Team	Year	Apps	Goals
Colombia	2013	7	2
Total		7	2

===== Senior =====
Team	Year	Apps	Goals
Colombia	2015	2	1
Total		2	1

===== Olympic =====
Team	Year	Apps	Goals
Colombia	2016	1	0
Total		1	0

=== International goals ===
==== Under-20 ====
Scores and results lists Colombia's goal tally first.

#	Date	Venue	Opponent	Score	Final	Competition
1.	3 June 2013	Parc des Sports, Avignon, France	France	3–1	3–1	2013 Toulon Tournament
2.	28 June 2013	Gaziantep Kamil Ocak Stadium, Gaziantep, Turkey	El Salvador	1–0	3–0	2013 FIFA U-20 World Cup

==== Senior ====
Scores and results lists Colombia's goal tally first.

#	Date	Venue	Opponent	Score	Final	Competition
1.	26 March 2015	Bahrain National Stadium, Riffa, Bahrain	Bahrain	6–0	6–0	Friendly

== Honours ==
=== Club ===
Alianza Petrolera

- Primera B: 2012

Jaguares de Córdoba

- Primera B: 2025–I

Santos Laguna

- Liga MX: Clausura 2015
- Copa MX: Apertura 2014
- Campeón de Campeones: 2015

Querétaro

- Copa MX: Apertura 2016

Cruz Azul

- Copa MX: Apertura 2018

=== Individual ===
- Primera B top goalscorer: 2012–II, 2025–I, 2025–II
- Copa MX top goalscorer: Apertura 2014
