= Jesús Orozco (Venezuelan footballer) =

Venezuelan footballer (born 2001)

Personal information
- Full name: Jesús Manuel Orozco Hernández
- Date of birth: 12 February 2001 (age 25)
- Place of birth: Venezuela
- Position: Forward

Youth career
- Deportivo Táchira

Senior career*
Years	Team	Apps	(Gls)
2018–2023	Deportivo Táchira	19	(4)
2021	→ Ureña (loan)		
- * Club domestic league appearances and goals as of 21:47, 6 March 2021 (UTC)

Jesús Manuel Orozco Hernández (born 12 February 2001) is a Venezuelan footballer who plays as a forward.

== Career ==
=== Club career ===
Orozco is a product of Deportivo Táchira and made his professional debut for the club on 19 August 2018 against Monagas in the Venezuelan Primera División. He started on the bench, before he came on as a substitute for Ronaldo Lucena in the 73rd minute. Orozco scored his first professional goal for Deportivo Táchira on 13 November 2020 against Portuguesa, where he became the match-winner in a 1–0 victory.

After a game between Deportivo Táchira and Brazilian club Internacional in the Copa Libertadores on 28 April 2021, which Táchira lost 0-4, it was revealed that Orozco had been invited to join the Brazilian club for a period, so Internacional could evaluate him.

On 30 July 2021, Orozco joined Ureña on loan for the rest of 2021.
