= Raúl Loaiza =

Colombian footballer (born 1994)

Personal information
- Full name: Raúl Alberto Loaiza Morelos
- Date of birth: 8 June 1994 (age 32)
- Place of birth: Cartagena, Colombia
- Height: 1.80 m (5 ft 11 in)
- Position: Defensive midfielder

Team information
- Current team: Lanús
- Number: 15

Youth career
- Academia Crespo

Senior career*
| Years | Team | Apps | (Gls) |
| 2013–2017 | Patriotas | 105 | (2) |
| 2017–2019 | Atlético Nacional | 21 | (0) |
| 2019 | → San Lorenzo (loan) | 8 | (0) |
| 2019–2022 | Defensa y Justicia | 60 | (2) |
| 2022– | Lanús | 73 | (2) |

International career
- Colombia U23
- * Club domestic league appearances and goals as of 15:55, 13 January 2025 (UTC)

Raúl Alberto Loaiza Morelos (born 8 June 1994) is a Colombian professional footballer who plays as a defensive midfielder for Lanús.

== Club career ==
Having spent part of his youth career with Academia Crespo, Loaiza began his senior career with Patriotas of Categoría Primera A. His professional debut came on 2 February 2013 during a 1–1 draw with Boyacá Chicó, which was the first of thirteen appearances in all competitions during the 2013 Categoría Primera A season. He scored two goals in the subsequent campaign, notably netting his first in a win against Atlético Huila in February 2014; the other came two months later in a 2–2 versus Envigado. He remained with Patriotas for the next three campaigns, taking his total appearance tally for them to one hundred and twenty-nine.

2017 saw Atlético Nacional complete the signing of Loaiza. Thirty-one appearances followed across 2017 and 2018. In December 2018, Loaiza agreed a loan move to San Lorenzo of the Argentine Primera División; effective from January 2019. He played seventeen times for them. On 25 July, Loaiza penned a permanent contract with fellow Argentine top-flight team Defensa y Justicia; signing for three years. Loaiza left Defense at the end of June 2022, to join fellow league club Lanús on a deal until the end of 2025.

== International career ==
Loaiza represented the Colombia U23s at international level under manager Carlos Restrepo. He was part of the squad that won a 2015 international friendly tournament in China. In May 2019, Loaiza received his first call-up to the senior team from Carlos Queiroz ahead of the Copa América in Brazil.

== Career statistics ==
As of 26 July 2019.

Club statistics
| Club | Season | League | | | Cup | | League Cup | | Continental | | Other | | Total | |
| Club | Season | Division | Apps | Goals | Apps | Goals | Apps | Goals | Apps | Goals | Apps | Goals | Apps | Goals |
|---|---|---|---|---|---|---|---|---|---|---|---|---|---|---|
| Patriotas | 2013 | Categoría Primera A | 10 | 0 | 3 | 0 | — | | — | | 0 | 0 | 13 | 0 |
| Patriotas | 2014 | Categoría Primera A | 25 | 2 | 9 | 0 | — | | — | | 0 | 0 | 34 | 2 |
| Patriotas | 2015 | Categoría Primera A | 27 | 0 | 5 | 0 | — | | — | | 0 | 0 | 32 | 0 |
| Patriotas | 2016 | Categoría Primera A | 26 | 0 | 2 | 0 | — | | — | | 2 (Note: Appearance(s) in the Categoría Primera A play-offs) | 0 | 30 | 0 |
| Patriotas | 2017 | Categoría Primera A | 17 | 0 | 1 | 0 | — | | 2 (Note: Appearance(s) in the Copa Sudamericana) | 0 | 0 | 0 | 20 | 0 |
| Patriotas | Total | | 105 | 2 | 20 | 0 | — | | 2 | 0 | 2 | 0 | 129 | 2 |
| Atlético Nacional | 2017 | Categoría Primera A | 8 | 0 | 2 | 0 | — | | 0 | 0 | 1 | 0 | 11 | 0 |
| Atlético Nacional | 2018 | Categoría Primera A | 13 | 0 | 2 | 0 | — | | 3 (Note: Appearance(s) in the Copa Libertadores) | 0 | 2 (Note: Appearance(s) in the Categoría Primera A play-offs and Superliga Colombiana) | 0 | 20 | 0 |
| Atlético Nacional | 2019 | Categoría Primera A | 0 | 0 | 0 | 0 | — | | 0 | 0 | 0 | 0 | 0 | 0 |
| Atlético Nacional | Total | | 21 | 0 | 4 | 0 | — | | 3 | 0 | 3 | 0 | 31 | 0 |
| San Lorenzo (loan) | 2018–19 | Primera División | 8 | 0 | 1 | 0 | 4 | 0 | 4 | 0 | 0 | 0 | 17 | 0 |
| Defensa y Justicia | 2019–20 | Primera División | 0 | 0 | 0 | 0 | 0 | 0 | 0 | 0 | 0 | 0 | 0 | 0 |
| Career total | | | 134 | 2 | 25 | 0 | 4 | 0 | 9 | 0 | 5 | 0 | 177 | 2 |

== Honours ==
Atlético Nacional

- Categoría Primera A: 2017 Apertura
- Copa Colombia: 2018

Defensa y Justicia

Copa Sudamericana: 2020
