= Michael López (Colombian footballer) =

Colombian footballer (born 1997)

Michael López Martínez
Personal information
- Full name: Michael López Martínez
- Date of birth: 8 February 1997 (age 29)
- Place of birth: Bello, Colombia
- Height: 1.80 m (5 ft 11 in)
- Position: Midfielder

Team information
- Current team: Cúcuta Deportivo
- Number: 19

Senior career*
| Years | Team | Apps | (Gls) |
| 2016–2019 | Envigado F.C. | 40 | (2) |
| 2019- | Cúcuta Deportivo | | |
- * Club domestic league appearances and goals as of 20 July 2019

Michael López Martínez (8 February 1997) is a Colombian footballer who plays as a midfielder for Cúcuta Deportivo.

He played for Envigado F.C. from 2016 to 2019. In 2019, he transferred to Cúcuta Deportivo.
