= Omar Duarte =

Colombian footballer (born 1995)

Personal information
- Full name: William Omar Duarte Figueroa
- Date of birth: 18 July 1995 (age 31)
- Place of birth: Cúcuta, Colombia
- Height: 1.80 m (5 ft 11 in)
- Position: Forward

Team information
- Current team: Atlético Huila
- Number: 9

Youth career
- Atlético Huila

Senior career*
Years	Team	Apps	(Gls)
2015–2022	Atlético Huila	113	(26)
2018–2019	→ Atletico Nacional (loan)	23	(3)
2022–2023	Jaguares de Córdoba	28	(6)
2024	Nacional Potosí	4	(0)
2024	Llaneros	17	(5)
2025–	Atlético Huila	39	(13)
- * Club domestic league appearances and goals as of 3 December 2025

Omar Duarte (born 18 July 1995), is a Colombian professional footballer who plays as a forward for Liga Bantrab club Comunicaciones.
