= Fernando Monetti =

Argentine footballer

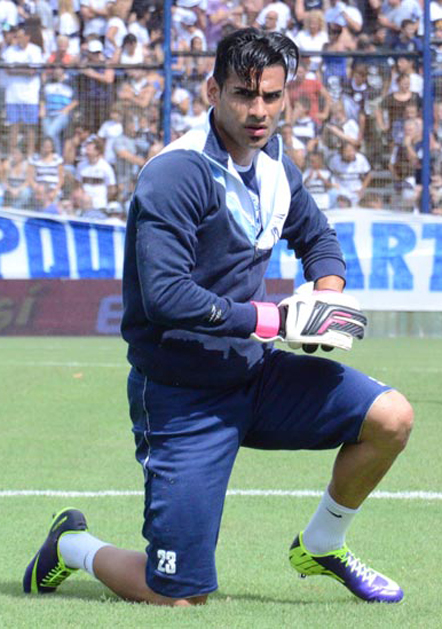

Personal information
- Full name: Fernando Monetti
- Date of birth: February 21, 1989 (age 37)
- Place of birth: La Plata, Argentina
- Height: 1.85 m (6 ft 1 in)
- Position: Goalkeeper

Team information
- Current team: Ferro Carril Oeste
- Number: 1

Youth career
- Gimnasia LP

Senior career*
Years	Team	Apps	(Gls)
2010–2015	Gimnasia LP	146	(0)
2015–2017	Lanús	66	(0)
2018–2019	Atlético Nacional	25	(0)
2019	→ San Lorenzo (loan)	7	(0)
2020–2022	San Lorenzo	23	(0)
2022	Lanús	36	(0)
2023–2024	Sarmiento	14	(0)
2025–	Ferro Carril Oeste	40	(0)
- * Club domestic league appearances and goals as of 17:00, 11 April 2026 (UTC)

Fernando Monetti (born 21 February 1989 in La Plata, Argentina) is an Argentine footballer who plays as a goalkeeper. He currently plays for Argentine team Ferro Carril Oeste.

== Career ==
He was the first choice keeper for Gimnasia La Plata from 2010 until 2015.
