= Alexis Henríquez =

Colombian footballer (born 1983)

Alexis Henriquez
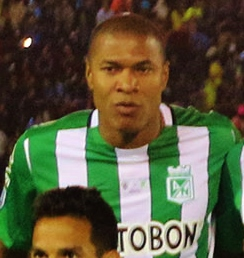
- Henriquez lining up for Atlético Nacional in 2016

Personal information
- Full name: Alexis Hector Henriquez Charales
- Date of birth: February 1, 1983 (age 43)
- Place of birth: Santa Marta, Colombia
- Height: 1.91 m (6 ft 3 in)
- Position: Centre-back

Senior career*
Years	Team	Apps	(Gls)
2002–2011	Once Caldas	145	(6)
2012–2019	Atlético Nacional	216	(7)

International career
2007–2010	Colombia	5	(0)
- * Club domestic league appearances and goals

Alexis Hector Henriquez Charales (1 February 1983) is a Colombian retired professional footballer who played as a defender.

Henriquez is a two-time winner of the Copa Libertadores. He first won the title with Once Caldas in 2004 and captained Atlético Nacional to its second title in 2016.

== International career ==
In 2007, Henriquez was called up to the Colombia national team by manager Jorge Luis Pinto, and made his debut in a 1–0 friendly win over Mexico.

== Club performance ==
Club performance		League		Cup		Continental		Other		Total	
Club	Season	Apps	Goals	Apps	Goals	Apps	Goals	Apps	Goals	Apps	Goals
Colombia		Categoría Primera A		Copa Colombia		Continental^{1}		Other^{2}		Total	
Atlético; Nacional	2012	21	0	9	0	7	0	2	0	39	0
Atlético; Nacional	2013	33	1	4	0	8	0	0	0	45	1
Atlético; Nacional	2014	24	1	6	0	14	0	0	0	44	1
Atlético; Nacional	2015	37	1	0	0	7	1	2	0	46	2
Atlético; Nacional	2016	19	1	5	0	19	0	0	0	43	1
Atlético; Nacional	Total	134	4	24	0	55	1	4	0	217	5
Career total		134	4	24	0	55	1	4	0	217	5

Statistics accurate as of last match played on 26 November 2016.

^{1} Includes cup competitions such as Copa Libertadores and Copa Sudamericana.

^{2} Includes Superliga Colombiana matches.

== Honours ==
=== Club ===
Once Caldas

- Categoría Primera A (3): 2003-I, 2009-I, 2010-II
- Copa Libertadores (1): 2004

Atlético Nacional

- Categoría Primera A (3): 2013-I, 2013-II, 2014-I
- Copa Colombia (2): 2012, 2013
- Superliga Colombiana (1): 2012
- Copa Libertadores (1): 2016
