= Christian Mafla =

Colombian footballer (born 1993)

Personal information
- Full name: Christian Camilo Mafla Rebellón
- Date of birth: 15 January 1993 (age 33)
- Place of birth: Palmira, Valle del Cauca, Colombia
- Height: 1.75 m (5 ft 9 in)
- Position: Defender

Team information
- Current team: Independiente Santa Fe
- Number: 32

Senior career*
Years	Team	Apps	(Gls)
2011	Boyacá Chicó	0	(0)
2012	América de Cali	17	(1)
2013–2014	Sud América	0	(0)
2013–2014	→ Olimpo (loan)	0	(0)
2014–2017	Atlético Bucaramanga	83	(2)
2017–2020	Atlético Nacional	62	(0)
2021–2022	New England Revolution	9	(0)
2021	New England Revolution II	3	(0)
2022	Deportivo Cali	26	(0)
2023–2025	Deportivo Pasto	77	(1)
2025–	Independiente Santa Fe	47	(5)
- * Club domestic league appearances and goals as of 11 December 2025

Christian Camilo Mafla Rebellón (born January 15, 1993), known as Christian Mafla, is a Colombian football player who plays for Categoría Primera A side Independiente Santa Fe.

== Career ==
=== Boyacá Chicó ===
Christian Mafla made his professional debut for Boyacá Chicó on April 27, 2011, during a 2-0 Copa Colombia loss to Alianza Petrolera.

=== New England Revolution ===
On 21 December 2020, the New England Revolution announced the signing of Christian Mafla from Atlético Nacional. On 2 February 2022, it was announced that Mafla and the Revolution had agreed to mutually part ways ahead of the 2022 season.

== Career statistics ==
=== Club ===
As of match played 21 July 2021

Appearances and goals by club, season and competition
Club	Season	League			National Cup		Continental		Other		Total	
Club	Season	Division	Apps	Goals	Apps	Goals	Apps	Goals	Apps	Goals	Apps	Goals
Boyacá Chicó	2011	Categoría Primera A	0	0	1	0	—		—		1	0
América de Cali	2012	Categoría Primera B	17	1	5	0	—		1 (Note: Appearance(s) in Promotion Playoffs)	0	23	1
Olimpo (loan)	2013–14	Argentine Primera División	0	0	0	0	—		—		0	0
Atlético Bucaramanga	2014	Categoría Primera B	13	1	3	0	—		—		16	1
Atlético Bucaramanga	2015	Categoría Primera B	26	0	3	0	—		—		29	0
Atlético Bucaramanga	2016	Categoría Primera A	24	0	5	0	—		—		29	0
Atlético Bucaramanga	2017	Categoría Primera A	20	1	1	0	—		—		21	1
Atlético Bucaramanga	Total		100	2	12	0	0	0	0	0	112	2
Atlético Nacional	2017	Categoría Primera A	3	0	1	0	—		—		4	0
Atlético Nacional	2018	Categoría Primera A	18	0	3	0	1 (Note: Appearance(s) in Copa Libertadores)	0	—		22	0
Atlético Nacional	2019	Categoría Primera A	30	0	0	0	1 (Note: Appearance(s) in Copa Sudamericana)	0	—		31	0
Atlético Nacional	2020	Categoría Primera A	11	0	4	0	2	0	—		17	0
Atlético Nacional	Total		62	0	8	0	4	0	0	0	74	0
New England Revolution	2021	MLS	3	0	0	0	0	0	0	0	3	0
New England Revolution	2021	USL1 (Note: With New England Revolution II)	3	0	0	0	0	0	0	0	3	0
New England Revolution	Total		6	0	0	0	0	0	0	0	6	0
Career total			168	3	26	0	4	0	1	0	193	3

== Honours ==
New England Revolution

- Supporters' Shield: 2021
