= John Henry Sánchez =

Colombian footballer (born 1995)

Personal information
- Full name: John Henry Sánchez Valencia
- Date of birth: 15 May 1995 (age 31)
- Place of birth: Tumaco, Colombia
- Height: 1.70 m (5 ft 7 in)
- Position: Midfielder

Team information
- Current team: Boyacá Chicó F.C.

Youth career
- Atlético Nacional

Senior career*
Years	Team	Apps	(Gls)
2013–2017	Atlético Nacional	2	(0)
2014	→ Leones (loan)	30	(3)
2015	→ Alianza Petrolera (loan)	15	(0)
2016	→ Olimpia (loan)	7	(0)
2017–2020	Leones	83	(3)
2019	→ Deportivo Pasto (loan)	3	(0)
2019–2020	→ Cortuluá (loan)	28	(2)
2021–2022	Rio Grande Valley FC	14	(1)
- * Club domestic league appearances and goals as of 00:07, 8 November 2021 (UTC)

John Henry Sánchez Valencia (born 15 May 1995) is a Colombian professional footballer for Boyacá Chicó F.C.

== Club career ==
=== Rio Grande Valley FC ===
On 30 April 2021, Sánchez signed with USL Championship side Rio Grande Valley FC. He made his debut for the club on 16 May 2021, starting in a 2–1 win over San Antonio FC.
