= Tomás Maya =

Colombian footballer (born 1996)

Personal information
- Full name: Tomás Maya Giraldo
- Date of birth: 12 September 1996 (age 30)
- Place of birth: Medellín, Colombia
- Height: 1.75 m (5 ft 9 in)
- Position: Left back

Senior career*
Years	Team	Apps	(Gls)
2016–2017	Atlético Nacional	17	(0)
2017	→ Leones (loan)	10	(0)
2018	Deportivo Pasto	8	(0)
2018–2019	Atlético Huila	14	(0)
2019	Santa Fe	5	(0)
2020	Cúcuta Deportivo	5	(0)
2020–2021	Envigado	8	(1)
2021	Deportivo Pasto	10	(0)
2022	Charlotte Independence	27	(0)
2023–2024	Dukla Banská Bystrica	0	(0)
2023–2024	→ Dolný Kubín (loan)	3	(0)
2024	Envigado	8	(0)
- * Club domestic league appearances and goals as of 17 November 2026

Tomás Maya Giraldo (12 September 1996) is a Colombian footballer who plays as a left back.
