= Gustavo Torres =

Colombian footballer (born 1996)

Personal information
- Full name: Gustavo Adolfo Torres Grueso
- Date of birth: 15 June 1996 (age 30)
- Place of birth: La Cumbre, Colombia
- Height: 1.81 m (5 ft 11 in)
- Position: Forward

Team information
- Current team: Deportivo Pereira
- Number: 17

Youth career
- –2012: Boca Juniors de Cali

Senior career*
Years	Team	Apps	(Gls)
2012–2013	Boca Juniors de Cali	0	(0)
2012–2013	→ Universitario Popayán (loan)	30	(4)
2014–2017	Deportes Quindío	99	(27)
2017–2021	Atlético Nacional	33	(11)
2019	→ San Lorenzo (loan)	5	(0)
2019	→ Rionegro Águilas (loan)	2	(0)
2020–2021	→ Vasco da Gama (loan)	9	(0)
2021	América de Cali	18	(3)
2022	Atlético Bucaramanga	31	(2)
2023	Unión Magdalena	18	(7)
2024	Once Caldas	21	(1)
2024–2025	Deportivo Pasto	39	(1)
2025–	Deportivo Pereira	12	(2)

International career
2013	Colombia U17	4	(1)
2014	Colombia U20	4	(0)
- * Club domestic league appearances and goals as of 12 December 2025

Gustavo Adolfo Torres Grueso (born 15 June 1996) is a Colombian professional footballer who plays as a forward for Deportivo Pereira.

== Career ==
=== National team ===
Torres represented Colombia for the 2013 South American Under-17 Football Championship held in Argentina. On 2 April 2013 Torres scored his first goal with the national U-17 team against Paraguay in a match that ended 1–1.

== Honours ==
Atlético Nacional

- Copa Colombia: 2018
