= Jeison Lucumí =

Colombian footballer (born 1995)

Personal information
- Full name: Jeison Steven Lucumí Mina
- Date of birth: 8 April 1995 (age 31)
- Place of birth: Cali, Colombia
- Height: 1.77 m (5 ft 10 in)
- Position: Winger

Team information
- Current team: Alajuelense
- Number: 33

Youth career
- Dépor

Senior career*
Years	Team	Apps	(Gls)
2012–2013	Dépor	31	(5)
2014–2017	América de Cali	104	(21)
2017–2019	Atlético Nacional	67	(8)
2019–2020	Tigres UANL	0	(0)
2019–2020	→ Querétaro (loan)	20	(4)
2020–2021	Elche	2	(0)
2021	América de Cali	33	(3)
2022–2025	Deportes Tolima	89	(12)
2025–	Alajuelense	17	(2)

International career
2015	Colombia U20	12	(4)
- * Club domestic league appearances and goals as of 21 May 2025

Jeison Steven Lucumí Mina (born 8 April 1995) is a Colombian professional footballer who plays for Costa Rican club Alajuelense as a right winger.

== Club career ==
Born in Cali, Lucumí started his career at hometown side Dépor FC, and made his first team debut on 2 August 2012, playing the last seven minutes of a 1–2 Categoría Primera B home loss against Atlético Bucaramanga. His first goal for the club came on 10 March of the following year, as he scored the winner in a 2–1 home success over Jaguares de Córdoba.

Ahead of the 2014 campaign, Lucumí moved to América de Cali, also in the second division. He helped the club achieve promotion to Categoría Primera A in 2016, being a regular starter, and made his debut in the top tier on 4 February 2017 by starting in a 0–0 home draw against Rionegro Águilas.

Lucumí scored his first goal in the Colombian first division on 19 February 2017, netting his team's second in a 3–0 away win against La Equidad. On 25 July of that year, after already scoring six goals for América, he agreed to a three-year contract with Atlético Nacional, for a fee of US$1.8 million; América also retained 30% of a future sale. On 14 October 2018, during a league match against Deportivo Cali, Lucumi was involved in a dispute with teammate Dayro Moreno, and was sent off after headbutting him. As a result, he was handed a three-match suspension, and a 400,000 COP fine (US$100) fine by DIMAYOR. In addition, he received an eight-day suspension from the club itself.

In June 2019, Lucumí moved abroad for the first time in his career, signing for Liga MX side Tigres UANL; Jarlan Barrera moved in the opposite direction. On 10 July, however, he was announced at fellow league team Querétaro.

On 15 September 2020, Lucumí joined La Liga newcomers Elche, reuniting with his former manager at Atlético Nacional, Jorge Almirón. On 1 February 2021, after just two league matches, he terminated his contract.

On 18 February 2021, Lucumí returned to Colombia and signed with América de Cali. A year later, in January 2022, Lucumí moved to Deportes Tolima.

== Honours ==
América de Cali

- Categoría Primera B: 2016

Atlético Nacional

- Copa Colombia: 2018
