= Christian Vargas (Colombian footballer) =

Colombian footballer (born 1989)

Personal information
- Full name: Christian Vargas Cortés
- Date of birth: 16 November 1989 (age 36)
- Place of birth: Pereira, Colombia
- Height: 1.84 m (6 ft 0 in)
- Position: Goalkeeper

Team information
- Current team: Malacateco
- Number: 1

Youth career
- Bajo Cauca

Senior career*
Years	Team	Apps	(Gls)
2006–2008	Bajo Cauca		
2008–2019	Atlético Nacional	40	(0)
2016	→ Atlético Huila (loan)	6	(0)
2019–2020	Atlético Bucaramanga	28	(0)
2020–2021	Millonarios	29	(0)
2022	Águilas Doradas	4	(0)
2022–2024	Deportes Tolima	4	(0)
2024-	Malacateco	0	(0)
- * Club domestic league appearances and goals as of 19:36, 25 December 2022 (UTC)

Christian Vargas Cortés (born 16 November 1989) is a Colombian professional footballer who plays as goalkeeper for Liga Nacional club Malacateco.
