= Jeisson Palacios =

Colombian footballer (born 1994)

Jeison Palacios
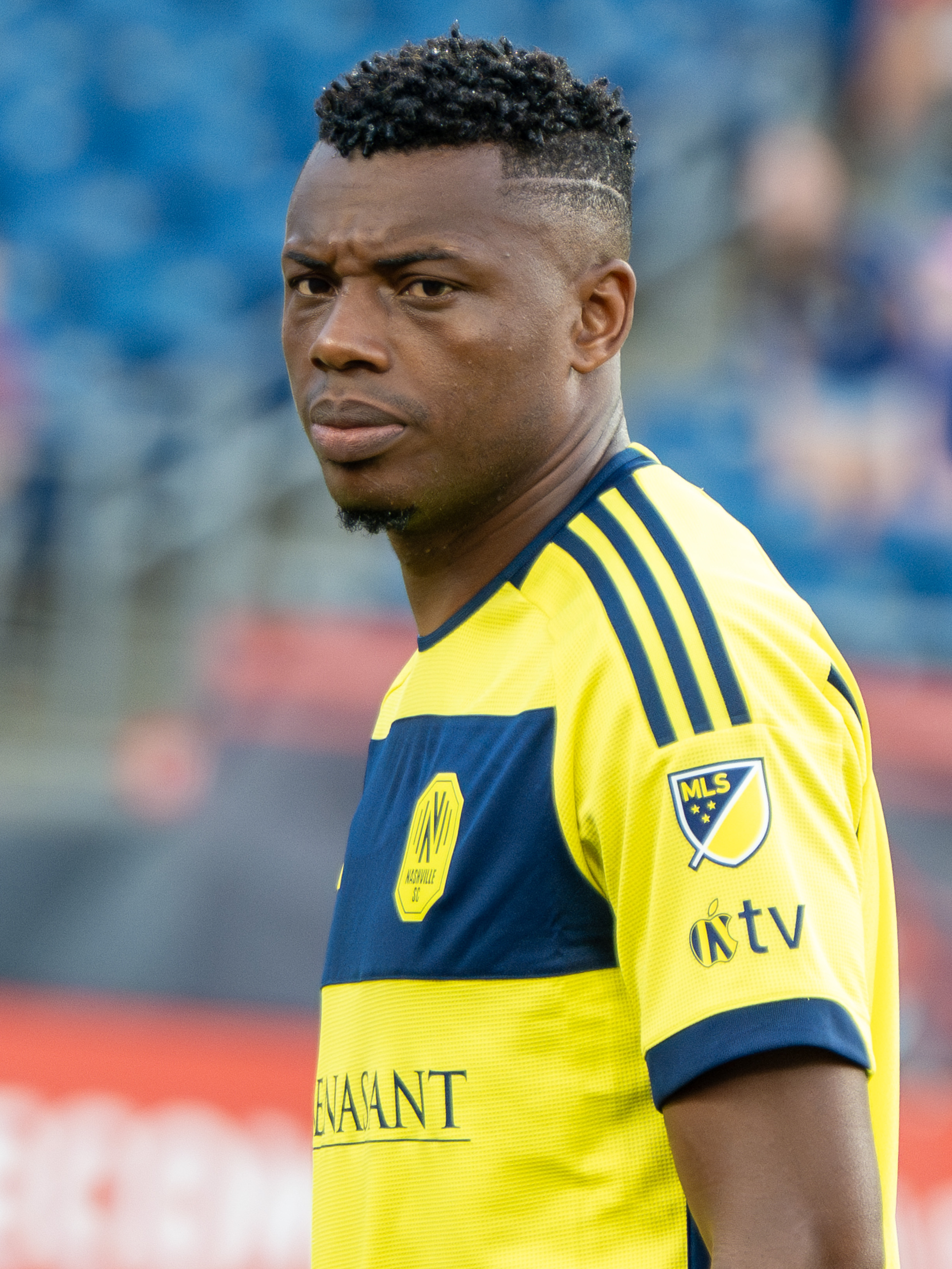
- Palacios in 2025

Personal information
- Full name: Jeison Andrés Palacios Murillo
- Date of birth: 20 March 1994 (age 32)
- Place of birth: Carepa, Colombia
- Height: 1.86 m (6 ft 1 in)
- Position: Centre-back

Team information
- Current team: Nashville SC
- Number: 4

Youth career
- –2014: Atlético Nacional

Senior career*
Years	Team	Apps	(Gls)
2014–2018	Atlético Nacional	0	(0)
2014	→ Leones (loan)	18	(1)
2015–2016	→ Alianza Petrolera (loan)	47	(2)
2017–2018	→ Atlético Bucaramanga (loan)	31	(2)
2019	Alianza Petrolera	44	(0)
2020–2021	Santa Fe	35	(3)
2021–2023	Pafos	27	(2)
2024	América de Cali	22	(1)
2025–	Nashville SC	48	(3)
- * Club domestic league appearances and goals as of 21 October 2026

Jeison Andrés Palacios Murillo (born 20 March 1994) is a Colombian footballer who plays as a centre-back for Nashville SC.

== Club career ==
On 19 June 2021, Palacios moved to Cyprus to sign for Pafos.
