= Jhon Mosquera (footballer, born 1990) =

Colombian footballer (born 1990)

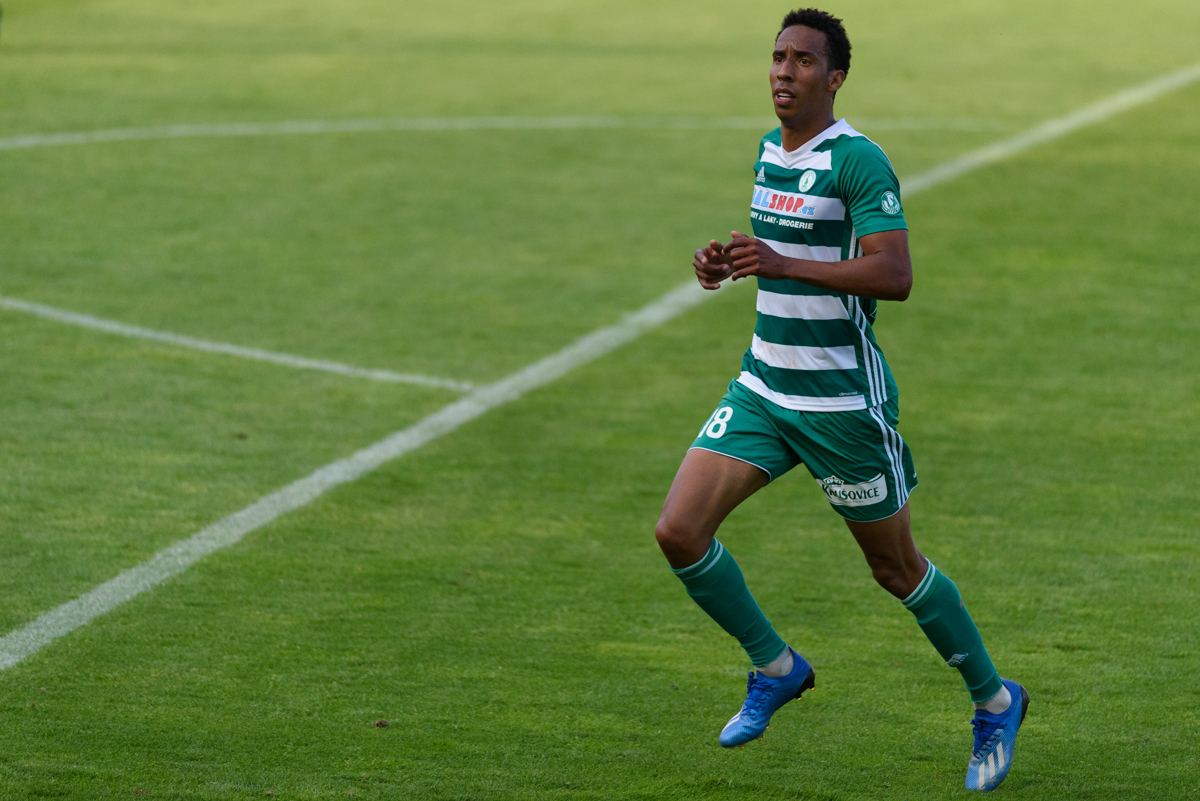
- Mosquera with Bohemians in 2020

Personal information
- Full name: Jhon Edison Mosquera Rebolledo
- Date of birth: 8 May 1990 (age 36)
- Place of birth: Cali, Colombia
- Height: 1.86 m (6 ft 1 in)
- Position: Midfielder

Youth career
- Deportivo Cali
- 2007: Mallorca
- 2007–2009: Dénia

Senior career*
Years	Team	Apps	(Gls)
2008–2009	El Campello	21	(2)
2010–2016	Hércules B	0	(0)
2010–2011	→ Villajoyosa (loan)	29	(6)
2011–2012	→ Jove Español B (loan)	4	(1)
2011–2012	→ Jove Español (loan)	38	(14)
2012–2013	→ Alcoyano (loan)	36	(0)
2013–2014	→ Olímpic Xàtiva (loan)	28	(4)
2014–2016	→ Bohemians (loan)	55	(3)
2016–2018	Atlético Nacional	31	(0)
2018–2019	Deportivo Cali	46	(4)
2020	Bohemians	10	(3)
2020–2021	Slovan Liberec	14	(6)
2021–2025	Viktoria Plzeň	92	(17)
2025	Dukla Prague	14	(1)
- * Club domestic league appearances and goals as of 9 June 2025

Jhon Edison Mosquera Rebolledo (born 8 May 1990) is a Colombian professional footballer who last played as a midfielder for Dukla Prague.

== Club career ==
He arrived in Spain in 2007, initially on Mallorca. Mosquera played in the Copa del Rey for Alcoyano against Real Madrid in 2012, although his team lost 4–1. He played for CD Olímpic de Xàtiva in the 2013–14 season.

He joined Czech club Bohemians 1905 in 2014, becoming their first Colombian player. He scored his first league goal for Bohemians in August 2014, striking in a 3–2 away win against Příbram.

On 29 January 2025, Mosquera signed a half-year contract with Dukla Prague as a free agent.

== Statistics ==
=== Club performance ===
Club performance		League		Cup		Continental		Other		Total	
Club	Season	Apps	Goals	Apps	Goals	Apps	Goals	Apps	Goals	Apps	Goals
Colombia		Categoría Primera A		Copa Colombia		Continental^{1}		Other^{2}		Total	
Atlético; Nacional	2016	8	0	6	0	9	1	0	0	23	1
Atlético; Nacional	2017	23	0	0	0	3	1	0	0	26	1
Atlético; Nacional	Total	31	0	6	0	12	2	0	0	49	2
Deportivo; Cali	2018	30	4	1	0	8	1	0	0	39	5
Deportivo; Cali	2019	16	0	1	0	3	0	0	0	20	0
Deportivo; Cali	Total	46	4	2	0	11	1	0	0	59	5
Career total		77	4	8	0	23	3	0	0	108	7

Statistics accurate as of last match played on 1 August 2019.

^{1} Includes cup competitions such as Copa Libertadores and Copa Sudamericana.

^{2} Includes Superliga Colombiana matches.
