= Sherman Cárdenas =

Colombian footballer (born 1989)

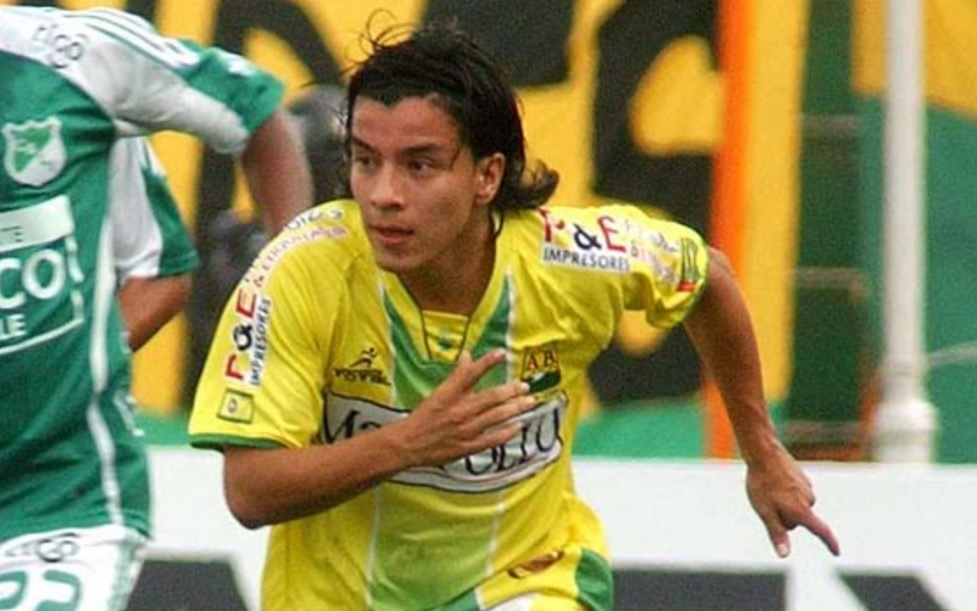
- Cárdenas playing for Atletico Bucaramanga

Personal information
- Full name: Sherman Andrés Cárdenas Estupiñán
- Date of birth: 7 August 1989 (age 37)
- Place of birth: Bucaramanga, Colombia
- Height: 1.67 m (5 ft 6 in)
- Position: Midfielder

Team information
- Current team: Atlético Bucaramanga

Senior career*
Years	Team	Apps	(Gls)
2005–2009	Atlético Bucaramanga		
2009	Millonarios	21	(0)
2010	La Equidad	44	(7)
2011–2012	Junior	49	(4)
2013–2016	Atlético Nacional	79	(13)
2015	→ Atlético Mineiro (loan)	25	(0)
2016–2017	Vitória	26	(0)
2017	LDU Quito	19	(2)
2018–2019	Atlético Bucaramanga	76	(13)
2020	Junior	18	(0)
2021	Santa Fe	14	(3)
2021–2022	Atlético Bucaramanga	63	(10)
2023	Once Caldas	29	(0)
2024	Alianza	12	(0)
2025–	Atlético Bucaramanga		
- * Club domestic league appearances and goals as of 14:53, 16 December 2024 (UTC)

Sherman Andrés Cárdenas Estupiñán (born 7 August 1989) is a Colombian footballer who plays as a midfielder for Atlético Bucaramanga.

== Career ==
In February 2015, Cardenas was signed by Brazilian club Atlético Mineiro.
