= Avimiled Rivas =

Colombian footballer (born 1984)

Personal information
- Full name: Avimiled Rivas Quintero
- Date of birth: 17 October 1984 (age 42)
- Place of birth: Cali, Colombia
- Height: 1.79 m (5 ft 10 in)
- Position: Defensive midfielder

Team information
- Current team: América de Cali
- Number: 30

Senior career*
Years	Team	Apps	(Gls)
2002	Millonarios	2	(0)
2002	Deportes Quindío	21	(2)
2003	Atlético Nacional	17	(0)
2003–2004	Poli Ejido	8	(0)
2004–2005	Eibar	5	(0)
2006	Deportes Quindío	2	(0)
2006	Once Caldas	10	(0)
2007	Deportes Quindío	5	(0)
2008–2009	Atlético Huila	13	(0)
2009–2010	Centro Ítalo	6	(1)
2011	Boyacá Chicó	23	(2)
2012	Once Caldas	12	(0)
2013	Cortuluá	18	(2)
2013–2014	Patriotas	30	(3)
2015–2017	Deportes Tolima	57	(1)
2018–	América de Cali	21	(1)

International career
2003	Colombia	2	(0)
- * Club domestic league appearances and goals as of 21:01, 5 May 2019 (UTC)

Avimiled Rivas Quintero (born 17 October 1984) is a Colombian football player who has played for Millonarios, Deportes Quindío, Atlético Nacional, CP Ejido, SD Eibar and Once Caldas, as well as the Colombia national team. Rivas currently plays for Cortuluá as an attacking midfielder.

With the Colombia national football team, he won the South American Youth Championship in 2005 and played the 2003 FIFA World Youth Championship reaching the semi-final and beating Argentina 2–1
