= Ezequiel Palomeque =

Colombian footballer (born 1992)

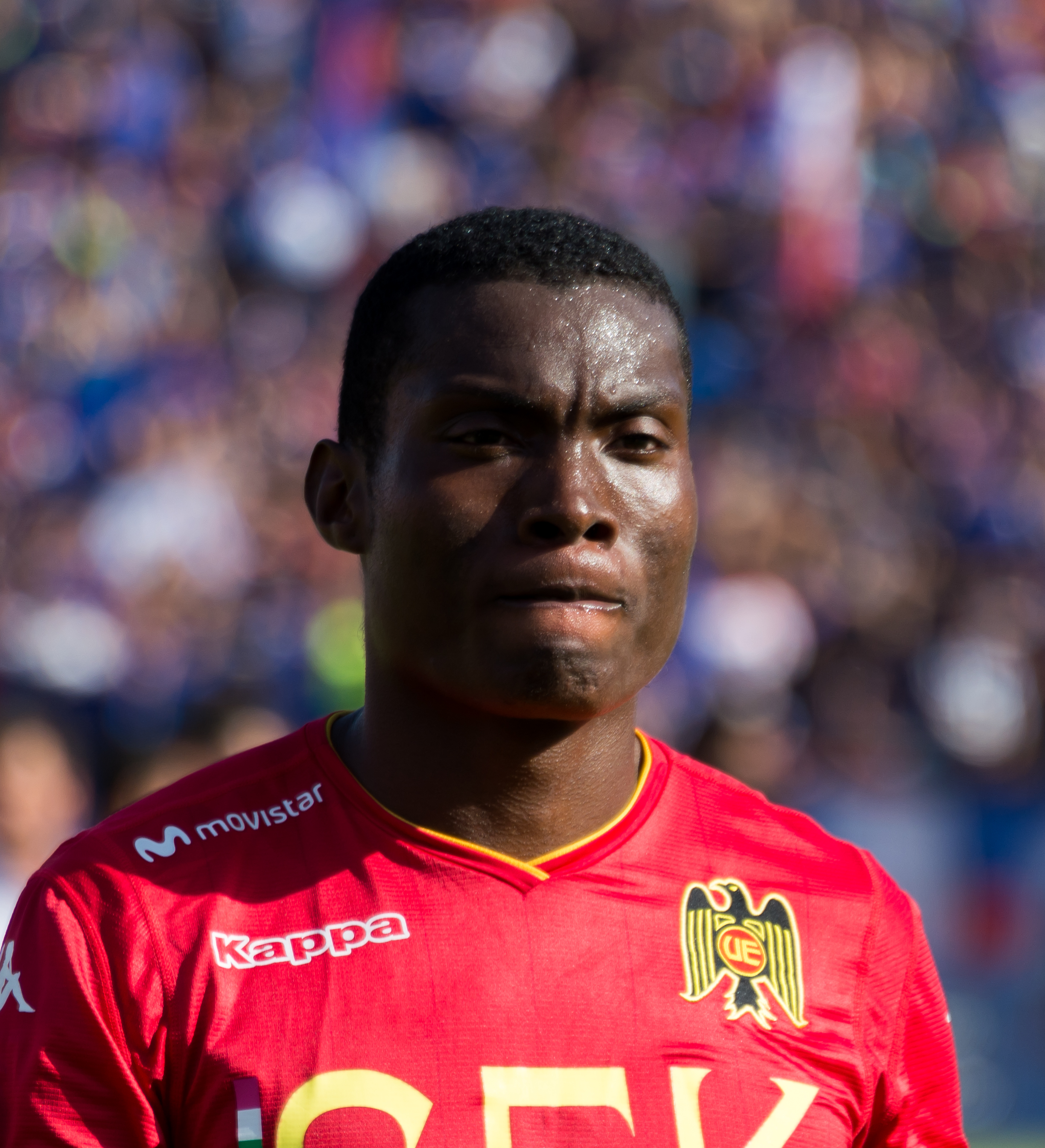

Personal information
- Full name: Ezequiel Palomeque Mena
- Date of birth: 7 October 1992 (age 34)
- Place of birth: Quibdó, Colombia
- Height: 1.93 m (6 ft 4 in)
- Position: Centre back

Team information
- Current team: Plaza Amador

Youth career
- CD Gallegol

Senior career*
Years	Team	Apps	(Gls)
2011–2012	Spartaks Jūrmala	0	(0)
2012	→ Sigma Olomouc (loan)	0	(0)
2012–2013	Gomel	2	(0)
2014–2015	Plaza Amador	34	(3)
2016	Cortuluá	3	(0)
2017	Atlético Nacional	15	(0)
2018	Deportivo Cali	24	(2)
2019–2020	Unión Española	11	(1)
2019–2020	→ Al-Raed (loan)	18	(0)
2021	Alianza Petrolera	1	(0)
2023	Plaza Amador	2	(0)
- * Club domestic league appearances and goals as of 31 December 2023

Ezequiel Palomeque Mena (born 7 October 1992) is a Colombian footballer (defender).
