= Ronaldo Lucena =

Venezuelan footballer (born 1997)

Personal information
- Full name: Ronaldo Vidal Lucena Torrealba
- Date of birth: 27 February 1997 (age 29)
- Place of birth: Acarigua, Portuguesa, Venezuela
- Height: 1.65 m (5 ft 5 in)
- Position: Midfielder

Team information
- Current team: Deportivo Lara

Youth career
- Centro Luso Acarigua
- Caracas

Senior career*
Years	Team	Apps	(Gls)
2015–2017	Zamora	30	(1)
2017–2020	Atlético Nacional	5	(0)
2018–2019	→ Deportivo Táchira (loan)	7	(0)
2019–2020	→ Jaguares de Córdoba (loan)	15	(0)
2021	Deportivo La Guaira	25	(2)
2022–2025	Portuguesa	80	(0)
2026–	Deportivo Lara	?	(?)

International career^{‡}
2017	Venezuela U20	14	(0)
2018	Venezuela U21	4	(0)
2017–	Venezuela	3	(0)
- * Club domestic league appearances and goals as of 20:39, 18 May 2023 (UTC) ‡ National team caps and goals as of 15:44, 11 January 2019 (UTC)

Ronaldo Vidal Lucena Torrealba (born 27 February 1997) is a Venezuelan footballer who plays for Deportivo Lara as a midfielder.

== International career ==
Lucena was called up to the Venezuela under-20 side for the 2017 FIFA U-20 World Cup.

== Career statistics ==
=== Club ===
As of 20 October 2019.

Club	Season	League			Cup		Continental		Other		Total	
Club	Season	Division	Apps	Goals	Apps	Goals	Apps	Goals	Apps	Goals	Apps	Goals
Zamora	2015	Venezuelan Primera División	8	0	1 (Note: Appearances in the Copa Venezuela)	0	–		0	0	9	0
Zamora	2016	Venezuelan Primera División	20	1	0	0	0	0	0	0	20	1
Zamora	2017	Venezuelan Primera División	2	0	0	0	0	0	0	0	2	0
Zamora	Total		30	1	1	0	0	0	0	0	31	1
Atlético Nacional	2017	Categoría Primera A	5	0	0	0	0	0	0	0	5	0
Atlético Nacional	2018	Categoría Primera A	0	0	0	0	0	0	0	0	0	0
Atlético Nacional	2019	Categoría Primera A	0	0	0	0	0	0	0	0	0	0
Atlético Nacional	Total		5	0	0	0	0	0	0	0	5	0
Deportivo Táchira (loan)	2018	Venezuelan Primera División	5	0	0	0	0	0	0	0	5	0
Deportivo Táchira (loan)	2018	Venezuelan Primera División	2	0	0	0	0	0	0	0	2	0
Deportivo Táchira (loan)	Total		7	0	0	0	0	0	0	0	7	0
Jaguares de Córdoba (loan)	2019	Categoría Primera A	11	0	0	0	–		0	0	11	0
Career total			53	1	1	0	0	0	0	0	54	1

=== International ===
As of matches played 11 January 2019.

National team	Year	Apps	Goals
Venezuela	2017	2	0
Venezuela	2018	1	0
Total		3	0

== Honours ==
=== International ===
Venezuela U-20

- FIFA U-20 World Cup: Runner-up 2017
- South American Youth Football Championship: Third Place 2017
