= 2023 Copa Colombia =

Copa BetPlay Dimayor 2023
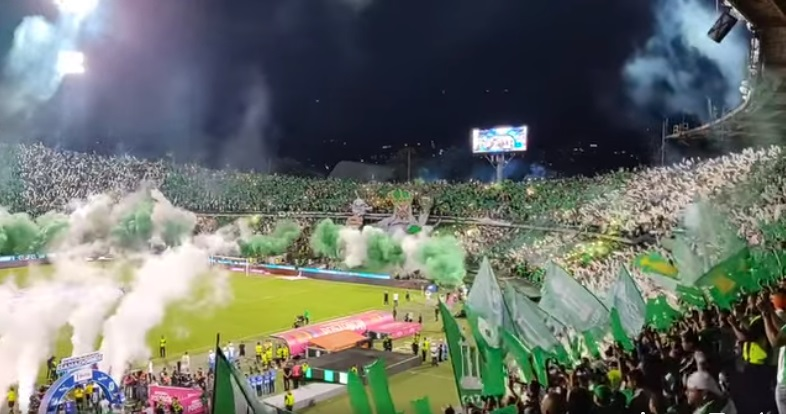
- Estadio Atanasio Girardot prior to the second leg of the final between Atlético Nacional and Millonarios.

Tournament details
- Country: Colombia
- Dates: 14 February – 23 November 2023
- Teams: 36

Final positions
- Champions: Atlético Nacional (6th title)
- Runners-up: Millonarios
- Copa Libertadores: Atlético Nacional

Tournament statistics
- Matches played: 70
- Goals scored: 152 (2.17 per match)
- Top goal scorer: Leonardo Castro (7 goals)

The 2023 Copa Colombia, officially the Copa BetPlay Dimayor 2023 for sponsorship reasons, was the 21st edition of the Copa Colombia, the national cup competition for clubs affiliated to DIMAYOR, the governing body of professional club football in Colombia. The tournament was contested by 36 teams, beginning on 14 February 2023 and ending on 23 November 2023.

Atlético Nacional won their sixth title in the competition, defeating the defending champions Millonarios in the finals on penalty kicks after a 2–2 draw on aggregate. As champions, Atlético Nacional qualified for the 2024 Copa Libertadores.

== Format ==
The format for the 2023 Copa Colombia featured changes in the entry points of the teams in each phase with respect to previous editions, while keeping its double-legged, single-elimination format. The first stage was contested by the eight lowest placed teams in the aggregate tables of both the 2022 Primera A and 2022 Primera B tournaments, with the Primera B teams drawn against a Primera A side in eight ties. The first stage winners then faced the remaining Primera B teams in the second round of the competition, with the eight winners advancing to the third stage where they were drawn against each other. The four third stage winners qualified for the round of 16, where they were joined by the remaining 12 Primera A teams which entered the competition at that point. In another departure from previous editions, the order of legs was drawn for each phase of competition, except for the second stage in which the first stage winners played the second leg at home.

== Schedule ==
The schedule of the competition was as follows:

Round	Draw date	First leg	Second leg
First stage	12 January 2023	14–16 February 2023	21–23 February 2023
Second stage	12 January 2023	15–16 March 2023	28–30 March 2023
Third stage	31 March 2023	5–6 and 12 April 2023	2–4 May 2023
Round of 16	5 July 2023	25 July – 10 August 2023	16–17 August 2023
Quarter-finals	22 August 2023	27–28 September 2023	4–5 October 2023
Semi-finals	6 October 2023	19 October – 2 November 2023	2–5 November 2023
Finals	8 November 2023	15 November 2023	23 November 2023

== First stage ==
The first stage was played by eight Categoría Primera A and eight Categoría Primera B clubs, with the latter seeded in the ties according to their placement in the 2022 season aggregate table. The Primera A clubs were drawn into each tie.

Team 1	Agg.	Team 2	1st leg	2nd leg
Boyacá Chicó (1)	1–1 (7–8 p)	Real Cartagena (2)	1–1	0–0
Alianza Petrolera (1)	4–2	Real Santander (2)	4–1	0–1
Atlético (2)	2–2 (2–4 p)	Envigado (1)	2–0	0–2
Barranquilla (2)	3–9	Deportivo Cali (1)	3–3	0–6
Valledupar (2)	0–3	Jaguares (1)	0–2	0–1
Boca Juniors de Cali (2)	0–4	Unión Magdalena (1)	0–1	0–3
Orsomarso (2)	1–0	Atlético Huila (1)	1–0	0–0
Cúcuta Deportivo (2)	3–2	Once Caldas (1)	3–1	0–1

=== First leg ===
14 February 2023	Orsomarso	1–0	Atlético Huila	Palmira
16:00 UTC−5	Tamayo 26'	Report		Stadium: Francisco Rivera Escobar; Referee: Ancizar Jiménez

14 February 2023	Valledupar	0–2	Jaguares	Valledupar
18:00 UTC−5		Report	Copete 48'; Guevara 79' (pen.)	Stadium: Armando Maestre Pavajeau; Referee: Esneider Pontón

15 February 2023	Atlético	2–0	Envigado	Cali
15:00 UTC−5	Álvarez 11'; Lizalda 90+1'	Report		Stadium: Pascual Guerrero; Referee: Carlos Márquez

15 February 2023	Boyacá Chicó	1–1	Real Cartagena	Tunja
17:15 UTC−5	Peña 36'	Report	Ospina 45'	Stadium: La Independencia; Referee: Brayan Liévano

15 February 2023	Alianza Petrolera	4–1	Real Santander	Barrancabermeja
18:00 UTC−5	Morales 21', 39'; Rodríguez 48' (pen.); Torres 72'	Report	Zapata 86'	Stadium: Daniel Villa Zapata; Referee: Alejandro Moncada

16 February 2023	Cúcuta Deportivo	3–1	Once Caldas	Cúcuta
15:30 UTC−5	Zapata 23'; Agudelo 31', 66'	Report	Cardona 38'	Stadium: General Santander; Referee: Yahir Cárdenas

16 February 2023	Boca Juniors de Cali	0–1	Unión Magdalena	Cali
16:00 UTC−5		Report	Vega 67'	Stadium: Pascual Guerrero; Referee: Javier Villa

16 February 2023	Barranquilla	3–3	Deportivo Cali	Barranquilla
17:30 UTC−5	Fori 38'; Carabalí 51'; Padilla 55'	Report	Ramos 45' (pen.); Cabal 45+3'; Viveros 48'	Stadium: Metropolitano Roberto Meléndez; Referee: Gustavo Cortés

=== Second leg ===
21 February 2023	Atlético Huila	0–0 (0–1 agg.)	Orsomarso	Neiva
18:00 UTC−5		Report		Stadium: Guillermo Plazas Alcid; Referee: Wilmar Montaño

22 February 2023	Unión Magdalena	3–0 (4–0 agg.)	Boca Juniors de Cali	Santa Marta
16:00 UTC−5	Vega 40'; Mercado 62'; Del Río 82'	Report		Stadium: Sierra Nevada; Referee: Jonathan Aguirre

22 February 2023	Jaguares	1–0 (3–0 agg.)	Valledupar	Montería
17:30 UTC−5	Castellanos 41'	Report		Stadium: Jaraguay; Referee: Liz Mair Suárez

22 February 2023	Envigado	2–0 (2–2 agg.) (4–2 p)	Atlético	Itagüí
17:30 UTC−5	Hurtado 5'; Noreña 85'	Report		Stadium: Metropolitano Ciudad de Itagüí; Referee: Gustavo Cortés
	Penalties
	Moreno (penalty scored); España (penalty scored); Zapata (penalty scored); Jaramillo (penalty missed); Parra (penalty scored)		(penalty missed) Carabalí; (penalty scored) Peña; (penalty missed) Reales; (penalty scored) Lizalda

22 February 2023	Once Caldas	1–0 (2–3 agg.)	Cúcuta Deportivo	Manizales
20:00 UTC−5	Artunduaga 58'	Report		Stadium: Palogrande; Referee: Diego Ulloa

23 February 2023	Real Santander	1–0 (2–4 agg.)	Alianza Petrolera	Piedecuesta
15:00 UTC−5	Báez 48'	Report		Stadium: Villa Concha; Referee: Jheison Abril

23 February 2023	Real Cartagena	0–0 (1–1 agg.) (8–7 p)	Boyacá Chicó	Cartagena
17:30 UTC−5		Report		Stadium: Jaime Morón León; Referee: Yahir Cárdenas
	Penalties
	S. Gómez (penalty scored); Robledo (penalty scored); J. Gómez (penalty scored); Rivas (penalty scored); Palomeque (penalty scored); Murillo (penalty scored); Gigli (penalty missed); Franco (penalty scored); Ortiz (penalty scored)		(penalty scored) Peña; (penalty scored) Balanta; (penalty scored) Lozano; (penalty scored) Asprilla; (penalty scored) Plazas; (penalty scored) Banguero; (penalty missed) Perea; (penalty scored) Del Castillo; (penalty missed) Moreno

23 February 2023	Deportivo Cali	6–0 (9–3 agg.)	Barranquilla	Palmira
20:00 UTC−5	Viveros 22', 48'; Parra 26'; Fori 45+2' (o.g.); Díaz 54'; Velasco 71'	Report		Stadium: Deportivo Cali; Referee: Steven Camargo

== Second stage ==
The second stage was played by the eight first stage winners as well as the top eight teams in the 2022 Primera B aggregate table, which were seeded into this stage according to their placement in the aggregate table. The first stage winners hosted the second leg.

Team 1	Agg.	Team 2	1st leg	2nd leg
Deportes Quindío (2)	0–2	Cúcuta Deportivo (2)	0–2	0–0
Patriotas (2)	0–1	Orsomarso (2)	0–0	0–1
Fortaleza (2)	4–5	Unión Magdalena (1)	2–1	2–4
Llaneros (2)	1–2	Jaguares (1)	1–1	0–1
Leones (2)	0–2	Deportivo Cali (1)	0–0	0–2
Tigres (2)	1–1 (4–1 p)	Envigado (1)	1–1	0–0
Bogotá (2)	2–3	Alianza Petrolera (1)	2–2	0–1
Cortuluá (2)	2–5	Real Cartagena (2)	1–3	1–2

=== First leg ===
15 March 2023	Cortuluá	1–3	Real Cartagena	Yumbo
15:00 UTC−5	Canizales 53' (pen.)	Report	Palacios 32'; Girado 66' (pen.); López 81'	Stadium: Municipal Raúl Miranda; Referee: David Espinosa

15 March 2023	Tigres	1–1	Envigado	Bogotá
15:15 UTC−5	Montes 20' (pen.)	Report	Andrade 5'	Stadium: Metropolitano de Techo; Referee: Didier Gracia

15 March 2023	Fortaleza	2–1	Unión Magdalena	Chía
15:15 UTC−5	Jiménez 24'; Lucumí 31'	Report	Márquez 79' (pen.)	Stadium: Villa Olímpica; Referee: Yahir Cárdenas

15 March 2023	Llaneros	1–1	Jaguares	Villavicencio
18:00 UTC−5	Nieva 59'	Report	Castellanos 8'	Stadium: Bello Horizonte; Referee: Wilmar Montaño

15 March 2023	Leones	0–0	Deportivo Cali	Itagüí
20:05 UTC−5		Report		Stadium: Metropolitano Ciudad de Itagüí; Referee: Mauricio Mercado

16 March 2023	Patriotas	0–0	Orsomarso	Tunja
15:30 UTC−5		Report		Stadium: La Independencia; Referee: Jonathan Aguirre

16 March 2023	Bogotá	2–2	Alianza Petrolera	Bogotá
18:00 UTC−5	Vergara 8', 88' (pen.)	Report	Patiño 32'; Rodas 40'	Stadium: Metropolitano de Techo; Referee: Alejandro Moncada

16 March 2023	Deportes Quindío	0–2	Cúcuta Deportivo	Armenia
20:05 UTC−5		Report	Agudelo 59'; Micolta 77'	Stadium: Centenario; Referee: Gustavo Cortés

=== Second leg ===
28 March 2023	Orsomarso	1–0 (1–0 agg.)	Patriotas	Palmira
15:30 UTC−5	Nieva 56'	Report		Stadium: Francisco Rivera Escobar; Referee: Wander Mosquera

29 March 2023	Envigado	0–0 (1–1 agg.) (1–4 p)	Tigres	Envigado
15:00 UTC−5		Report		Stadium: Polideportivo Sur; Referee: Liz Mair Suárez
	Penalties
	J. Zapata (penalty missed); Arcila (penalty scored); Espinal (penalty missed)		(penalty scored) Payares; (penalty scored) Velásquez; (penalty scored) Salguero; (penalty scored) Lopera

29 March 2023	Alianza Petrolera	1–0 (3–2 agg.)	Bogotá	Barrancabermeja
16:00 UTC−5	Bueno 36'	Report		Stadium: Daniel Villa Zapata; Referee: Mauricio Mercado

29 March 2023	Deportivo Cali	2–0 (2–0 agg.)	Leones	Palmira
17:30 UTC−5	Arroyo 9'; Vásquez 72'	Report		Stadium: Deportivo Cali; Referee: Jonathan Ortiz

29 March 2023	Real Cartagena	2–1 (5–2 agg.)	Cortuluá	Cartagena
19:00 UTC−5	Gómez 71'; Girado 86'	Report	Vergara 19'	Stadium: Jaime Morón León; Referee: Diego Escalante

30 March 2023	Cúcuta Deportivo	0–0 (2–0 agg.)	Deportes Quindío	Cúcuta
15:30 UTC−5		Report		Stadium: General Santander; Referee: Diego Ulloa

30 March 2023	Jaguares	1–0 (2–1 agg.)	Llaneros	Montería
16:00 UTC−5	Mosquera 45'	Report		Stadium: Jaraguay; Referee: José Ortiz

30 March 2023	Unión Magdalena	4–2 (5–4 agg.)	Fortaleza	Santa Marta
19:30 UTC−5	Mercado 19'; Lucero 43', 45'; Guerrero 87'	Report	Jiménez 48'; Lucumí 72' (pen.)	Stadium: Sierra Nevada; Referee: Luis Delgado

== Third stage ==
The third stage was played by the eight second stage winners.

Team 1	Agg.	Team 2	1st leg	2nd leg
Real Cartagena (2)	0–1	Cúcuta Deportivo (2)	0–1	0–0
Orsomarso (2)	2–4	Alianza Petrolera (1)	1–1	1–3
Unión Magdalena (1)	1–1 (2–4 p)	Tigres (2)	1–0	0–1
Deportivo Cali (1)	1–1 (5–3 p)	Jaguares (1)	1–0	0–1

=== First leg ===
5 April 2023	Unión Magdalena	1–0	Tigres	Santa Marta
15:30 UTC−5	Carabalí 8'	Report		Stadium: Sierra Nevada; Referee: Diego Ulloa

5 April 2023	Deportivo Cali	1–0	Jaguares	Palmira
19:00 UTC−5	Vásquez 20'	Report		Stadium: Deportivo Cali; Referee: Edilson Ariza

6 April 2023	Orsomarso	1–1	Alianza Petrolera	Palmira
14:50 UTC−5	Gómez 57' (pen.)	Report	E. Torres 66'	Stadium: Francisco Rivera Escobar; Referee: Jonathan Ortiz

12 April 2023	Real Cartagena	0–1	Cúcuta Deportivo	Cartagena
18:00 UTC−5		Report	Filigrana 37'	Stadium: Jaime Morón León; Referee: Wilmar Montaño

=== Second leg ===
2 May 2023	Tigres	1–0 (1–1 agg.) (4–2 p)	Unión Magdalena	Bogotá
15:00 UTC−5	López 34'	Report		Stadium: Metropolitano de Techo; Referee: Mauricio Mercado
	Penalties
	Payares (penalty scored); Mahecha (penalty scored); Bonilla (penalty scored); Lopera (penalty scored)		(penalty scored) Márquez; (penalty scored) Vega; (penalty missed) Palacios; (penalty missed) Carabalí

2 May 2023	Alianza Petrolera	3–1 (4–2 agg.)	Orsomarso	Barrancabermeja
19:40 UTC−5	Rodríguez 55'; Ceballos 64'; Gil 86'	Report	Abonía 73'	Stadium: Daniel Villa Zapata; Referee: Jonathan Ortiz

3 May 2023	Cúcuta Deportivo	0–0 (1–0 agg.)	Real Cartagena	Cúcuta
15:45 UTC−5		Report		Stadium: General Santander; Referee: Luis Delgado

4 May 2023	Jaguares	1–0 (1–1 agg.) (3–5 p)	Deportivo Cali	Montería
15:45 UTC−5	Mendoza 73'	Report		Stadium: Jaraguay; Referee: Ferney Trujillo
	Penalties
	Rojas (penalty missed); Castaño (penalty scored); Arboleda (penalty scored); Guevara (penalty scored)		(penalty scored) Velasco; (penalty scored) Ramírez; (penalty scored) Díaz; (penalty scored) Camargo; (penalty scored) Arroyo

== Final stages ==
Each round in the final stages was played under a home-and-away two-legged format. The teams entering the competition at this stage were the top 12 teams in the aggregate table of the 2022 Primera A season. The order of legs of each tie was decided by draw. In case of a draw on aggregate score at the end of the second leg, extra time was not played and the winner was decided in a penalty shoot-out.

=== Bracket ===
Round of 16
Millonarios	3	0	3
Atlético Bucaramanga	1	0	1
Alianza Petrolera (p)	2	0	2 (3)
Deportes Tolima	0	2	2 (1)
Cúcuta Deportivo (p)	4	1	5 (4)
Junior	3	2	5 (3)
Independiente Medellín (p)	3	1	4 (4)
Deportivo Pasto	1	3	4 (3)
Deportivo Cali	2	0	2 (1)
Santa Fe (p)	1	1	2 (3)
Tigres	0	0	0
Deportivo Pereira	1	1	2
La Equidad	1	1	2 (4)
Águilas Doradas (p)	0	2	2 (5)
América de Cali	1	1	2
Atlético Nacional	3	2	5

Quarter-finals
Millonarios	2	2	4
Alianza Petrolera	0	1	1
Cúcuta Deportivo (p)	0	2	2 (5)
Independiente Medellín	1	1	2 (4)
Santa Fe	0	0	0
Deportivo Pereira	0	2	2
Águilas Doradas	0	1	1
Atlético Nacional	3	2	5

Semi-finals
Millonarios	1	1	2
Cúcuta Deportivo	0	1	1
Deportivo Pereira	2	1	3 (4)
Atlético Nacional (p)	0	3	3 (5)

Finals
Millonarios	1	1	2 (4)
Atlético Nacional (p)	1	1	2 (5)

=== Round of 16 ===
Team 1	Agg.	Team 2	1st leg	2nd leg
América de Cali (1)	2–5	Atlético Nacional (1)	1–3	1–2
Deportivo Cali (1)	2–2 (1–3 p)	Santa Fe (1)	2–1	0–1
Cúcuta Deportivo (2)	5–5 (4–3 p)	Junior (1)	4–3	1–2
Tigres (2)	0–2	Deportivo Pereira (1)	0–1	0–1
Millonarios (1)	3–1	Atlético Bucaramanga (1)	3–1	0–0
Alianza Petrolera (1)	2–2 (3–1 p)	Deportes Tolima (1)	2–0	0–2
La Equidad (1)	2–2 (4–5 p)	Águilas Doradas (1)	1–0	1–2
Independiente Medellín (1)	4–4 (4–3 p)	Deportivo Pasto (1)	3–1	1–3

==== First leg ====
25 July 2023	La Equidad	1–0	Águilas Doradas	Bogotá
19:00 UTC−5	Lloreda 56'	Report		Stadium: Metropolitano de Techo; Referee: Luis Delgado

26 July 2023	Tigres	0–1	Deportivo Pereira	Bogotá
15:30 UTC−5		Report	Ed. Moreno 89'	Stadium: Metropolitano de Techo; Referee: Mauricio Mercado

26 July 2023	Alianza Petrolera	2–0	Deportes Tolima	Barrancabermeja
18:30 UTC−5	Acosta 30' (pen.); Parra 88'	Report		Stadium: Daniel Villa Zapata; Referee: David Espinosa

26 July 2023	América de Cali	1–3	Atlético Nacional	Cali
20:00 UTC−5	Quiñónes 13'	Report	Perea 2'; Deossa 45+2'; Angulo 76'	Stadium: Pascual Guerrero; Referee: Eder Vergara

27 July 2023	Cúcuta Deportivo	4–3	Junior	Cúcuta
16:00 UTC−5	Olivera 24' (o.g.); Agudelo 50'; Estupiñán 56'; Ríos 67'	Report	Fuentes 55'; Rojas 60'; Bacca 72'	Stadium: General Santander; Referee: Diego Escalante

27 July 2023	Deportivo Cali	2–1	Santa Fe	Palmira
20:00 UTC−5	Mera 87'; Sandoval 90+7'	Report	Manjarrés 51'	Stadium: Deportivo Cali; Referee: Carlos Ortega

9 August 2023	Independiente Medellín	3–1	Deportivo Pasto	Medellín
19:00 UTC−5	Alvarado 14'; Cetré 22'; Monsalve 90'	Report	D. López 45+3'	Stadium: Atanasio Girardot; Referee: Wander Mosquera

10 August 2023	Millonarios	3–1	Atlético Bucaramanga	Bogotá
20:10 UTC−5	L. Castro 59' (pen.), 72'; B. Castro 80'	Report	Martínez 37'	Stadium: El Campín; Referee: Diego Ruiz

==== Second leg ====
16 August 2023	Santa Fe	1–0 (2–2 agg.) (3–1 p)	Deportivo Cali	Bogotá
18:00 UTC−5	González 90+1'	Report		Stadium: El Campín; Referee: Éder Vergara
	Penalties
	Sambueza (penalty scored); Rivera (penalty scored); Ditta (penalty missed); Millán (penalty scored)		(penalty scored) T. Gutiérrez; (penalty missed) Ospina; (penalty missed) Haquin; (penalty missed) Córdoba

16 August 2023	Águilas Doradas	2–1 (2–2 agg.) (5–4 p)	La Equidad	Rionegro
18:00 UTC−5	Banguero 37'; Cuenú 45'	Report	Lloreda 25'	Stadium: Alberto Grisales; Referee: Jhon Hinestroza

16 August 2023	Deportivo Pereira	1–0 (2–0 agg.)	Tigres	Pereira
19:00 UTC−5	Ramírez 71' (pen.)	Report		Stadium: Hernán Ramírez Villegas; Referee: Jonathan Ortiz

16 August 2023	Deportes Tolima	2–0 (2–2 agg.) (1–3 p)	Alianza Petrolera	Ibagué
19:00 UTC−5	González 71'; Haydar 90+7'	Report		Stadium: Manuel Murillo Toro; Referee: Liz Mair Suárez

16 August 2023	Junior	2–1 (5–5 agg.) (3–4 p)	Cúcuta Deportivo	Barranquilla
20:30 UTC−5	Bacca 14'; González 90+9' (pen.)	Report	Agudelo 54'	Stadium: Metropolitano Roberto Meléndez; Referee: Héctor Rivera
	Penalties
	Bacca (penalty scored); González (penalty scored); Hernández (penalty missed); Fuentes (penalty scored); Rojas (penalty missed)		(penalty scored) Díaz; (penalty scored) Duarte; (penalty scored) Peralta; (penalty missed) Mastrolía; (penalty scored) Moreno

17 August 2023	Atlético Bucaramanga	0–0 (1–3 agg.)	Millonarios	Bucaramanga
18:00 UTC−5		Report		Stadium: Alfonso López; Referee: Ferney Trujillo

17 August 2023	Deportivo Pasto	3–1 (4–4 agg.) (3–4 p)	Independiente Medellín	Pasto
18:00 UTC−5	Da. Moreno 55'; D. López 85', 90+2'	Report	Gómez 24'	Stadium: Departamental Libertad; Referee: Steven Camargo
	Penalties
	Da. Moreno (penalty scored); Cardona (penalty missed); Ayala (penalty scored); D. López (penalty missed); Malagón (penalty scored)		(penalty scored) Loaiza; (penalty missed) Londoño; (penalty scored) Di. Moreno; (penalty scored) Cuesta; (penalty scored) Pons

17 August 2023	Atlético Nacional	2–1 (5–2 agg.)	América de Cali	Medellín
20:30 UTC−5	Moreno 21'; Je. Duque 65'	Report	Barrios 35'	Stadium: Atanasio Girardot; Referee: Carlos Ortega

=== Quarter-finals ===
Team 1	Agg.	Team 2	1st leg	2nd leg
Cúcuta Deportivo (2)	2–2 (5–4 p)	Independiente Medellín (1)	0–1	2–1
Águilas Doradas (1)	1–5	Atlético Nacional (1)	0–3	1–2
Santa Fe (1)	0–2	Deportivo Pereira (1)	0–0	0–2
Millonarios (1)	4–1	Alianza Petrolera (1)	2–0	2–1

==== First leg ====
27 September 2023	Santa Fe	0–0	Deportivo Pereira	Bogotá
18:15 UTC−5		Report		Stadium: El Campín; Referee: Edilson Ariza

27 September 2023	Águilas Doradas	0–3	Atlético Nacional	Rionegro
20:30 UTC−5		Report	Aguirre 37'; Mejía 63'; Je. Duque 90+4'	Stadium: Alberto Grisales; Referee: Carlos Betancur

28 September 2023	Cúcuta Deportivo	0–1	Independiente Medellín	Cúcuta
17:00 UTC−5		Report	Pons 87'	Stadium: General Santander; Referee: Juan Pablo Alba

28 September 2023	Millonarios	2–0	Alianza Petrolera	Bogotá
19:10 UTC−5	L. Castro 26'; Guerra 41'	Report		Stadium: El Campín; Referee: Luis Matorel

==== Second leg ====
4 October 2023	Deportivo Pereira	2–0 (2–0 agg.)	Santa Fe	Pereira
18:00 UTC−5	Mosquera 16' (o.g.); K. Valencia 87'	Report		Stadium: Hernán Ramírez Villegas; Referee: Diego Ulloa

4 October 2023	Atlético Nacional	2–1 (5–1 agg.)	Águilas Doradas	Medellín
20:30 UTC−5	Perea 22'; Pabón 69'	Report	Cuenú 14'	Stadium: Atanasio Girardot; Referee: Jhon Hinestroza

5 October 2023	Independiente Medellín	1–2 (2–2 agg.) (4–5 p)	Cúcuta Deportivo	Medellín
18:00 UTC−5	Gómez 87'	Report	Zapata 25'; Micolta 69'	Stadium: Atanasio Girardot; Referee: Héctor Rivera
	Penalties
	Ricaurte (penalty scored); Pons (penalty scored); Ibargüen (penalty scored); Varela (penalty scored); D. Moreno (penalty missed)		(penalty scored) Díaz; (penalty scored) Mosquera; (penalty scored) Guzmán; (penalty scored) Hinestroza; (penalty scored) Micolta

5 October 2023	Alianza Petrolera	1–2 (1–4 agg.)	Millonarios	Barrancabermeja
20:30 UTC−5	E. Torres 90+2' (pen.)	Report	L. Castro 73' (pen.); Carvajal 89'	Stadium: Daniel Villa Zapata; Referee: Nolberto Ararat

=== Semi-finals ===
Team 1	Agg.	Team 2	1st leg	2nd leg
Millonarios (1)	2–1	Cúcuta Deportivo (2)	1–0	1–1
Deportivo Pereira (1)	3–3 (4–5 p)	Atlético Nacional (1)	2–0	1–3

==== First leg ====
19 October 2023	Deportivo Pereira	2–0	Atlético Nacional	Pereira
20:00 UTC−5	Quintero 12'; Cabrera 90'	Report		Stadium: Hernán Ramírez Villegas; Referee: Luis Matorel

2 November 2023	Millonarios	1–0	Cúcuta Deportivo	Bogotá
20:00 UTC−5	L. Castro 74'	Report		Stadium: El Campín; Referee: David Espinosa

==== Second leg ====
2 November 2023	Atlético Nacional	3–1 (3–3 agg.) (5–4 p)	Deportivo Pereira	Envigado
15:00 UTC−5	Je. Duque 35', 72'; E. Ramírez 45+2'	Report	Balboa 59'	Stadium: Polideportivo Sur; Referee: Nolberto Ararat
	Penalties
	Pabón (penalty scored); Mejía (penalty scored); Mier (penalty scored); Jader (penalty scored); Mosquera (penalty scored)		(penalty scored) C. Ramírez; (penalty scored) Suárez; (penalty scored) Ar. Rodríguez; (penalty scored) Medina; (penalty missed) Bocanegra

5 November 2023	Cúcuta Deportivo	1–1 (1–2 agg.)	Millonarios	Cúcuta
17:00 UTC−5	Peralta 17'	Report	Ruiz 45'	Stadium: General Santander; Referee: Carlos Betancur

=== Finals ===
15 November 2023
20:00 UTC−5

Millonarios	1–1	Atlético Nacional
L. Castro 80'	Report	Pabón 20'

Estadio El Campín, Bogotá
Referee: Jhon Hinestroza

23 November 2023
20:00 UTC−5

Atlético Nacional	1–1	Millonarios
Aguirre 90+3'	Report	L. Castro 59'
Penalties
Je. Duque (penalty scored); Mejía (penalty scored); Mier (penalty scored); Mosquera (penalty scored); Ramírez (penalty scored)	5–4	(penalty scored) Pereira; (penalty scored) Arias; (penalty scored) Vargas; (penalty missed) Guerra; (penalty scored) Vásquez

Estadio Atanasio Girardot, Medellín
Referee: Carlos Betancur

Tied 2–2 on aggregate, Atlético Nacional won on penalties.

Copa BetPlay Dimayor
2023 champions

6th title

== Top scorers ==
Rank	Player	Club	Goals
1	(Colombia) Leonardo Castro	Millonarios	7
2	(Colombia) Jefferson Duque	Atlético Nacional	4
2	(Colombia) Jonathan Agudelo	Cúcuta Deportivo	4
4	(Colombia) Darwin López	Deportivo Pasto	3
4	(Colombia) Kevin Viveros	Deportivo Cali	3
4	(Colombia) Jefry Zapata	Cúcuta Deportivo	3

Source: Besoccer

== See also ==
- 2023 Categoría Primera A season
- 2023 Categoría Primera B season
