= Juan Pablo Torres (Colombian footballer) =

Colombian footballer

Personal information
- Full name: Juan Pablo Torres Patiño
- Date of birth: 22 June 2004 (age 22)
- Place of birth: Itagüí, Antioquia, Colombia
- Height: 1.71 m (5 ft 7 in)
- Position: Midfielder

Team information
- Current team: Necaxa
- Number: 11

Youth career
- Atlético Nacional

Senior career*
| Years | Team | Apps | (Gls) |
| 2022–2026 | Atlético Nacional | 39 | (3) |
| 2025–2026 | → Deportes Tolima (loan) | 43 | (10) |
| 2026– | Club Necaxa | 10 | (0) |
- * Club domestic league appearances and goals as of 17:31, 10 October 2026 (UTC)

Juan Pablo ''Tatay'' Torres Patiño (born 9 March 2001) is a Colombian professional footballer who plays as a midfielder for Liga MX club Necaxa.

== Club career ==
=== Atlético Nacional ===
Torres came through the youth setup at Atlético Nacional. On 11 July 2022, he made his debut in the Liga DIMAYOR in a game against Cortuluá. On 2 August 2022, he signed his first professional contract, running until June 2025. He scored his first goal for the club 2 minutes in a 3–0 win against Independiente Santa Fe on 20 September 2023. Less than a month later, he scored again, this time in a 2–0 win over Alianza Petrolera.

==== Loan to Deportes Tolima ====
In July 2025, he was loaned to Deportes Tolima. On 1 March 2026, he scored a penalty to help his side to a 1–0 win over his former club, Atlético Nacional. Later that month on 11 March, he scored in the 87th minute of a 2–0 win against O'Higgins in the final qualifying round of the Copa Libertadores, sending his side through to the group stage after winning 2–1 on aggregate.

=== Necaxa ===
On 14 June 2026, he moved abroad to join Liga MX club Necaxa for a fee of €1.3 million. He scored his first goal on 13 August, a 76th minute winner to complete a comeback in a 2–1 Leagues Cup victory against New York City FC.

== International career ==
On 14 April 2023, he was called up to the Colombia national under-20 team for a training camp ahead of the U-20 World Cup.

== Career statistics ==
As of match played on 28 September 2026

Appearances and goals by club, season and competition
| Club | Season | League | | | Cup | | Continental (Note: Includes Copa Libertadores) | | Other | | Total | |
| Club | Season | Division | Apps | Goals | Apps | Goals | Apps | Goals | Apps | Goals | Apps | Goals |
|---|---|---|---|---|---|---|---|---|---|---|---|---|
| Atlético Nacional | 2022 | Liga DIMAYOR | 1 | 0 | — | | — | | — | | 1 | 0 |
| Atlético Nacional | 2023 | Liga DIMAYOR | 26 | 3 | 5 | 0 | 4 | 0 | — | | 35 | 3 |
| Atlético Nacional | 2024 | Liga DIMAYOR | 10 | 0 | 3 | 0 | — | | — | | 13 | 0 |
| Atlético Nacional | 2025 | Liga DIMAYOR | 2 | 0 | — | | — | | — | | 2 | 0 |
| Atlético Nacional | Total | | 39 | 3 | 8 | 0 | 4 | 0 | — | | 51 | 3 |
| Deportes Tolima (loan) | 2025 | Liga DIMAYOR | 25 | 3 | — | | — | | — | | 25 | 3 |
| Deportes Tolima (loan) | 2026 | Liga DIMAYOR | 18 | 7 | — | | 10 | 1 | — | | 28 | 8 |
| Deportes Tolima (loan) | Total | | 43 | 10 | — | | 10 | 1 | — | | 53 | 11 |
| Necaxa | 2026–27 | Liga MX | 10 | 0 | — | | — | | 2 (Note: Appearances in Leagues Cup) | 1 | 12 | 1 |
| Career total | | | 92 | 13 | 8 | 0 | 14 | 1 | 2 | 1 | 116 | 15 |

== Honours ==
Atlético Nacional

- Torneo Apertura: 2022 Apertura, 2024 Clausura
- Copa Colombia: 2023, 2024
- Superliga Colombiana: 2023, 2025
