= 2023 Superliga Colombiana =

Deportivo Pereira	Atlético Nacional
3	5

First leg
Deportivo Pereira	Atlético Nacional
0	1
- Date: 8 February 2023
- Venue: Estadio Hernán Ramírez Villegas, Pereira
- Referee: Andrés Rojas

Second leg
Atlético Nacional	Deportivo Pereira
4	3
- Date: 16 February 2023
- Venue: Estadio Atanasio Girardot, Medellín
- Referee: Bismarks Santiago

The 2023 Superliga Colombiana (officially known as the Superliga BetPlay Dimayor 2023 for sponsorship purposes) was the twelfth edition of the Superliga Colombiana, Colombia's football super cup tournament organized by DIMAYOR. It was contested by Atlético Nacional and Deportivo Pereira, champions of the 2022 Categoría Primera A season tournaments, from 8 to 16 February 2023.

Atlético Nacional defeated Deportivo Pereira 5–3 on aggregate to win their third Superliga Colombiana title.

== Teams ==
Team	Qualification	Previous appearances (bold indicates winners)
Atlético Nacional	2022 Apertura champions	5 (**2012**, 2014, 2015, **2016**, 2018)
Deportivo Pereira	2022 Finalización champions	None

== Matches ==
=== First leg ===
8 February 2023
20:00 UTC−5

Deportivo Pereira	0–1	Atlético Nacional
	Report	Román 77'

Estadio Hernán Ramírez Villegas, Pereira
Referee: Andrés Rojas

**Deportivo Pereira**	**Atlético Nacional**

GK	1	(Colombia) Aldair Quintana
RB	16	(Colombia) Eber Moreno
CB	3	(Colombia) Diego Hernández
CB	29	(Colombia) Carlos Ramírez
LB	13	(Colombia) Juan Pablo Zuluaga
DM	25	(Colombia) Jhonny Vásquez (c)
CM	20	(Colombia) Yilmar Velásquez	(yellow card) 46' (yellow-red card) 49'
CM	18	(Colombia) Maicol Medina	(yellow card) 19'	(substituted off) 86'
AM	10	(Colombia) Yesus Cabrera	(substituted off) 59'
CF	30	(Colombia) Arley Rodríguez	(substituted off) 80'
CF	9	(Colombia) Ángelo Rodríguez
Substitutes:
GK	22	(United States) Santiago Castaño
DF	6	(Colombia) Edisson Restrepo
DF	26	(Colombia) Yeison Suárez
MF	15	(Colombia) Kener Valencia	(substituted on) 80'
FW	7	(Colombia) Kevin Palacios	(substituted on) 86'
FW	11	(Colombia) Johan Bocanegra	(substituted on) 59'
FW	23	(Colombia) Kevin Aladesanmi
Manager:
(Colombia) Alejandro Restrepo

GK	23	(Colombia) Kevin Mier
RB	6	(Colombia) Andrés Román
CB	2	(Colombia) Cristián Zapata (c)
CB	16	(Colombia) Sergio Mosquera
CB	2	(Colombia) Juan Felipe Aguirre	(yellow card) 23' (yellow-red card) 66'
LB	20	(Colombia) Danovis Banguero	(yellow card) 82'
CM	18	(Colombia) Yéiler Góez
CM	30	(Colombia) Jhon Solís	(yellow card) 55'	(substituted off) 62'
AM	10	(Colombia) Jarlan Barrera	(substituted off) 88'
CF	7	(Brazil) Francisco da Costa	(yellow card) 13'
CF	9	(Colombia) Jefferson Duque	(substituted off) 63'
Substitutes:
GK	1	(Colombia) Harlen Castillo
DF	42	(Colombia) Cristian Devenish	(substituted on) 88'	(yellow card) 90+1'
MF	13	(Colombia) Juan Pablo Torres
MF	19	(Colombia) Yerson Candelo	(substituted on) 63'
MF	88	(Colombia) Dorlan Pabón	(substituted on) 62'
FW	11	(Brazil) Jader Gentil
FW	21	(Colombia) Tomás Ángel
Manager:
(Brazil) Paulo Autuori

Assistant referees:
John León
Mario Tarache
Fourth official:
Luis Delgado
Video assistant referee:
Lisandro Castillo
Assistant video assistant referee:
Herminzul Calderón

**Match rules**

- 90 minutes.
- Seven named substitutes.
- Maximum of five substitutions.

=== Second leg ===
16 February 2023
20:00 UTC−5

Atlético Nacional	4–3	Deportivo Pereira
Ángel 60', 69'; Pabón 84' (pen.), 87'	Report	Zuluaga 7', 34'; Ar. Rodríguez 63'

Estadio Atanasio Girardot, Medellín
Referee: Bismarks Santiago

**Atlético Nacional**	**Deportivo Pereira**

GK	23	(Colombia) Kevin Mier
RB	6	(Colombia) Andrés Román	(yellow card) 74'
CB	16	(Colombia) Sergio Mosquera	(yellow card) 23'	(substituted off) 46'
CB	2	(Colombia) Cristián Zapata (c)
CB	42	(Colombia) Cristian Devenish	(substituted off) 38'
LB	20	(Colombia) Danovis Banguero
CM	18	(Colombia) Yéiler Góez	(substituted off) 62'
CM	30	(Colombia) Jhon Solís
RW	10	(Colombia) Jarlan Barrera	(substituted off) 46'
LW	88	(Colombia) Dorlan Pabón	(yellow card) 16'	(substituted off) 90+8'
CF	9	(Colombia) Jefferson Duque	(yellow card) 89'
Substitutes:
GK	1	(Colombia) Harlen Castillo
MF	5	(Colombia) Jhon Duque	(substituted on) 62'
MF	13	(Colombia) Juan Pablo Torres
MF	15	(Colombia) Nelson Palacio	(substituted on) 46'
FW	11	(Brazil) Jader Gentil	(substituted on) 46'
FW	21	(Colombia) Tomás Ángel	(substituted on) 38'
FW	31	(Colombia) Brahian Palacios	(substituted on) 90+8'
Manager:
(Brazil) Paulo Autuori

GK	1	(Colombia) Aldair Quintana	(yellow card) 79'
RB	16	(Colombia) Eber Moreno	(substituted off) 67'
CB	3	(Colombia) Diego Hernández	(substituted off) 86'
CB	5	(Colombia) Geisson Perea
CB	29	(Colombia) Carlos Ramírez	(yellow card) 82'
LB	13	(Colombia) Juan Pablo Zuluaga	(yellow card) 90+4'
CM	25	(Colombia) Jhonny Vásquez (c)	(yellow card) 82'
CM	18	(Colombia) Maicol Medina	(substituted off) 86'
AM	10	(Colombia) Yesus Cabrera	(substituted off) 74'
CF	30	(Colombia) Arley Rodríguez	(yellow card) 85'
CF	9	(Colombia) Ángelo Rodríguez	(yellow card) 31'
Substitutes:
GK	22	(United States) Santiago Castaño
DF	6	(Colombia) Edisson Restrepo
MF	8	(Colombia) Larry Angulo	(substituted on) 86'
MF	27	(Colombia) Jimer Fory	(substituted on) 74'
FW	7	(Colombia) Kevin Palacios
FW	11	(Colombia) Johan Bocanegra	(substituted on) 67'
FW	23	(Colombia) Kevin Aladesanmi	(substituted on) 86'
Manager:
(Colombia) Alejandro Restrepo

Assistant referees:
David Fuentes
Camilo Portela
Fourth official:
Ferney Trujillo
Video assistant referee:
Fernando Acuña
Assistant video assistant referee:
Cristian de la Cruz

**Match rules**

- 90 minutes.
- Penalty shoot-out if tied on aggregate.
- Seven named substitutes.
- Maximum of five substitutions.

Atlético Nacional won 5–3 on aggregate.

Superliga Colombiana
2023 champions

**3rd title**
