= Yerson Candelo =

Colombian footballer (born 1992)

Personal information
- Full name: Yerson Candelo Miranda
- Date of birth: 24 February 1992 (age 34)
- Place of birth: Cali, Colombia
- Height: 1.72 m (5 ft 8 in)
- Position: Winger

Team information
- Current team: América de Cali
- Number: 92

Youth career
- Deportivo Cali

Senior career*
Years	Team	Apps	(Gls)
2010–2015	Deportivo Cali	147	(3)
2015–2018	Querétaro	85	(7)
2018–2023	Atlético Nacional	158	(8)
2023	Aucas	15	(1)
2024	Criciúma	13	(0)
2024–	América de Cali	39	(0)

International career^{‡}
2022–	Colombia	1	(0)
- * Club domestic league appearances and goals as of 11 December 2025 ‡ National team caps and goals as of 11:46, 19 January 2022 (UTC)

Yerson Candelo Miranda (born 24 February 1992) is a Colombian footballer who plays as a right winger for América de Cali.

== Club career ==
=== Deportivo Cali ===
Candelo joined Deportivo Cali's youth academy at a young age and made his professional debut in 2010.

=== Queretaro ===
In 2015, Deportivo Cali and Queretaro reached terms for the 3 million dollar transfer of Candelo to "Los Gallos Blancos."

=== Atletico Nacional ===
On 20 June 2018 he signed for Atlético Nacional. On 1 November 2018, Candelo won his first title with the club, the 2018 Copa Colombia.

On 22 June, in the first leg of the 2022 Apertura finals against Deportes Tolima, Candelo scored a long range goal from the middle of the pitch, to put his team 2–1 up in an eventual 3–1 win. This goal was recognized by FIFA as a potential Puskas Award candidate. Nacional later won the finals 4–3 on aggregate, with Candelo participating in the second leg.

In February 2023, he won his third title with the club, after Nacional won the 2023 Superliga Colombiana 5–3 on aggregate against Deportivo Pereira, with Candelo participating as a substitute in the first leg.

Shortly after the 2023 Apertura finals, which Nacional lost to rivals Millonarios, Nacional terminated Candelo's contract. It was rumored that this decision was taken because of a situation that happened in the closing minutes of the second leg of the finals, where mainly Candelo and Dorlan Pabón prevented two substitutions, against the decisions of manager Paulo Autuori, whose idea was to bring these players on for the penalty shootout. However, Candelo states that he never had anything to do with the substitutions, and that the club said they wanted to prioritize their younger players.

=== Aucas ===
On 30 July 2023, Candelo joined Ecuadorian side Aucas, after heavy interest from Millonarios. Candelo scored his first league goal for the club in a 4–0 victory against Mushuc Runa in the Liga Pro.

=== Criciúma ===
After a season with Aucas, Candelo signed for recently promoted Brazilian side Criciúma.

== International career ==
Candelo made his debut for the Colombia national team on 16 January 2022 in a 2–1 home win over Honduras.

== Career statistics ==
As of 2 January 2024

Appearances and goals by club, season and competition
Club	Season	League			Cup		Continental		Other		Total	
Club	Season	Division	Apps	Goals	Apps	Goals	Apps	Goals	Apps	Goals	Apps	Goals
Deportivo Cali	2010	Categoría Primera A	1	0	0	0	—		—		1	0
Deportivo Cali	2011	Categoría Primera A	13	0	5	1	1 (Note: Appearance(s) in the Copa Sudamericana)	0	—		19	1
Deportivo Cali	2012	Categoría Primera A	37	0	2	0	—		—		39	0
Deportivo Cali	2013	Categoría Primera A	33	0	6	1	—		—		39	1
Deportivo Cali	2014	Categoría Primera A	38	2	4	0	8 (Note: Four appearances in the Copa Libertadores, four appearances in the Copa Sudamericana)	0	2 (Note: Appearance(s) in the Superliga Colombiana)	0	52	2
Deportivo Cali	2015	Categoría Primera A	25	1	3	0	—		—		28	1
Deportivo Cali	Total		147	3	20	2	9	0	2	0	178	5
Querétaro	2015–16	Liga MX	28	3	0	0	6 (Note: Appearance(s) in the CONCACAF Champions League)	1	—		34	4
Querétaro	2016–17	Liga MX	30	3	8	1	—		—		38	4
Querétaro	2017–18	Liga MX	27	1	6	2	—		1 (Note: Appearance(s) in the Supercopa MX)	0	34	3
Querétaro	Total		85	7	14	3	6	1	1	0	106	11
Atlético Nacional	2018	Categoría Primera A	16	1	5	0	1 (Note: Appearance(s) in the Copa Libertadores)	0	—		22	1
Atlético Nacional	2019	Categoría Primera A	40	4	4	0	3	0	—		47	4
Atlético Nacional	2020	Categoría Primera A	14	0	1	0	4	0	—		19	0
Atlético Nacional	2021	Categoría Primera A	32	1	4	0	10	0	—		46	1
Atlético Nacional	2022	Categoría Primera A	37	1	3	0	1	0	—		41	1
Atlético Nacional	2023	Categoría Primera A	19	1	0	0	5	0	1	0	25	1
Atlético Nacional	Total		158	8	17	0	24	0	1	0	200	8
Aucas	2023	Ecuadorian Serie A	15	1	—		—		—		15	1
Career totals			405	19	51	5	39	1	4	0	499	25

== Honours ==
=== Club ===
Deportivo Cali

- Superliga Colombiana: 2014

Querétaro

- Copa MX: 2016 Apertura
- Supercopa MX: 2017

Atlético Nacional

- Copa Colombia: 2018, 2021
- Categoría Primera A: 2022 Apertura
- Superliga Colombiana: 2023
