= Tomás Ángel =

Colombian footballer (born 2003)

Personal information
- Full name: Tomás Ángel Gutiérrez
- Date of birth: 20 February 2003 (age 23)
- Place of birth: Birmingham, England
- Height: 1.74 m (5 ft 9 in)
- Position: Forward

Team information
- Current team: América de Cali
- Number: 21

Youth career
- Atlético Nacional
- C.D. Estudiantil
- 2020–2021: Atlético Nacional

Senior career*
Years	Team	Apps	(Gls)
2021–2023	Atlético Nacional	40	(6)
2024	Los Angeles FC	5	(1)
2024	Los Angeles FC 2	5	(3)
2024	→ Phoenix Rising (loan)	14	(3)
2025–2026	San Diego FC	22	(3)
2026–	América de Cali	20	(3)

International career^{‡}
2021–2023	Colombia U20	23	(10)
- * Club domestic league appearances and goals as of 16:37, 7 September 2025 (UTC) ‡ National team caps and goals as of 18:02, 21 July 2023 (UTC)

Tomás Ángel Gutiérrez (born 20 February 2003) is a professional footballer who plays as a forward for América de Cali. Born in England, he most recently represented Colombia at youth level.

== Early life ==
Ángel was born on 20 February 2003 to former footballer Juan Pablo Ángel, while Juan Pablo was playing in England for Aston Villa. Because of this, Tomás Ángel was born in Birmingham, England. Ángel inherited his passion for football from his father, and would accompany his father to training when he was playing for the New York Red Bulls.

His elder brother Gerónimo is a musician, actor and model who featured on Colombian kid's talent show, La Voz Kids, while his younger brother Pascual is also a footballer. The three were raised in England until 2007, when they moved to the United States.

== Club career ==
=== Early career ===
Having lived in the United States until the age of ten, Ángel moved to Colombia in 2013, going on to play for the academy of Atlético Nacional, the former club of his father. He moved to Club Deportivo Estudiantil, where he played under the tutelage of manager Alejandro Restrepo, and regularly topped their goal-scoring charts during his progression through the academy.

=== Atlético Nacional ===
==== 2020–2021: Signing and debut ====
In early 2020, he returned to Atlético Nacional, where, following good performances for the under-17 side, he was invited to train with the first team, and was named by English newspaper The Guardian in their "Next Generation 2020" list, highlighting the best players born in 2003 worldwide.

He signed his first contract with the club in January 2021, before making his debut in the same month, coming on as a second-half substitute for Andrés Andrade in a 5–2 Categoría Primera A win against Deportivo Pereira. Two months later, on 7 March, he scored his first goal for the club in an eventual 1–1 draw with Águilas Doradas; shortly after kick-off, Ángel received the ball from teammate Jefferson Duque, before avoiding a tackle and placing the ball past Águilas Doradas goalkeeper Carlos Bejarano from the edge of the area.

Having not added to his goal tally for the 2021 season, Ángel spoke with Caracol Radio, stating that he appreciated the support and advice of his father, and that while he knew he had to "earn people's respect by scoring goals and playing well", he had "shown that [he has] what [it takes] to play for Nacional". Following the departure of Atlético Nacional first team coach Alexandre Guimarães in June 2021, Ángel's former manager at Estudiantil, Alejandro Restrepo, was appointed manager, and despite him not having a consistent run in the first team, Ángel said that he respected Restrepo's decisions, and that he did not want to waste the opportunity to play in his natural position when it arose.

==== 2022: Failure to build on debut ====
Ángel did not feature at the beginning of the 2022 season, and having been played as a winger the previous year by manager Restrepo, rather than his natural centre-forward role, Ángel stated in a press conference that he had spoken with Restrepo and informed him that he wished to play in his natural position. Following Restrepo's departure from the club in February 2022, his replacement, Hernán Herrera, gave Ángel only one start, in a total of four appearances, between March and July 2022. After Herrera also left the club, interim manager Pedro Sarmiento stated that he also did not see Ángel as a centre-forward, and following this interview, Ángel would not feature for the rest of the season.

==== 2023: Return to the first team ====
Following the appointment of new manager Paulo Autuori, Ángel returned to the Atlético Nacional first team, and after a good start to the season, scoring five goals in the 2023 Torneo Apertura, Ángel was linked with a move to Spanish side Barcelona. On 16 February 2023, Ángel came off the bench to score two goals and provide an assist to help Nacional to a 4–3 victory over Deportivo Pereira to capture the 2023 Superliga Colombiana. However, after Autuori departed the club, his replacement, William Amaral, selected youth player Jayder Asprilla as his centre-forward for the 2023 Torneo Finalización, ahead of Ángel.

=== Los Angeles FC ===
On 31 January 2024, Ángel joined Major League Soccer side Los Angeles FC. Ángel scored his first MLS goal on 22 June 2024, in a 6–2 win over San Jose Earthquakes.

==== Phoenix Rising FC (loan) ====
On 2 August 2024, Ángel was loaned to Phoenix Rising in the USL Championship for the remainder of the 2024 season.

=== San Diego FC ===
On 9 December 2024, Ángel was traded to expansion club San Diego FC in exchange for $200,000 in allocation money with San Diego receiving a second-round pick in the 2025 MLS Superdraft.

=== América de Cali ===
On 1 March 2026, was transferred to Colombian Liga DIMAYOR side América de Cali for an undisclosed transfer fee.

== International career ==
Having already represented Colombia at under-20 level, Ángel was left out of the squad ahead of the 2023 South American U-20 Championship, with manager Héctor Cárdenas stating that he had problems coexisting with other members of the squad. In an interview with Caracol Radio, Ángel responded, stating that Cárdenas' claim was "a lie", and that he and his teammates were "very fond of each other". At a later press conference, Ángel said that it was his inactivity with Atlético Nacional in the 2022 season that had denied him a place in the squad. Ahead of the 2023 FIFA U-20 World Cup in May 2023, Ángel stated in an interview with Medellín-based newspaper El Colombiano that he was hoping to be called up to the final squad.

Having been included in the squad for the 2023 FIFA U-20 World Cup, Ángel was brought on as a late substitute in Colombia's opening 2–1 win against Israel. In the following game against Japan, he was brought on at half-time for Jorge Cabezas Hurtado, and helped Colombia overturn a 1–0 deficit to win 2–1, scoring the second goal after Yáser Asprilla had levelled the scoreline. In the round of 16 game against Slovakia, Ángel provided two goals as Colombia won 5–1.

== Career statistics ==
=== Club ===
As of match played 22 June 2024

Appearances and goals by club, season and competition
Club	Season	League			Cup		Continental		Other		Total	
Club	Season	Division	Apps	Goals	Apps	Goals	Apps	Goals	Apps	Goals	Apps	Goals
Atlético Nacional	2021	Categoría Primera A	12	1	3 (Note: Appearances in the Copa Colombia)	0	0	0	0	0	15	1
Atlético Nacional	2022	Categoría Primera A	4	0	1	0	0	0	0	0	5	0
Atlético Nacional	2023	Categoría Primera A	24	5	4	2	4 (Note: Appearances in the Copa Libertadores)	0	0	0	32	7
Los Angeles FC 2	2024	MLS Next Pro	4	3	–		–		–		4	3
Los Angeles FC	2024	Major League Soccer	3	1	1 (Note: Appearance in US Open Cup)	0	0	0	0	0	4	1
Career total			47	10	9	2	4	0	0	0	60	12
