= Wuilker Faríñez =

Venezuelan footballer (born 1998)

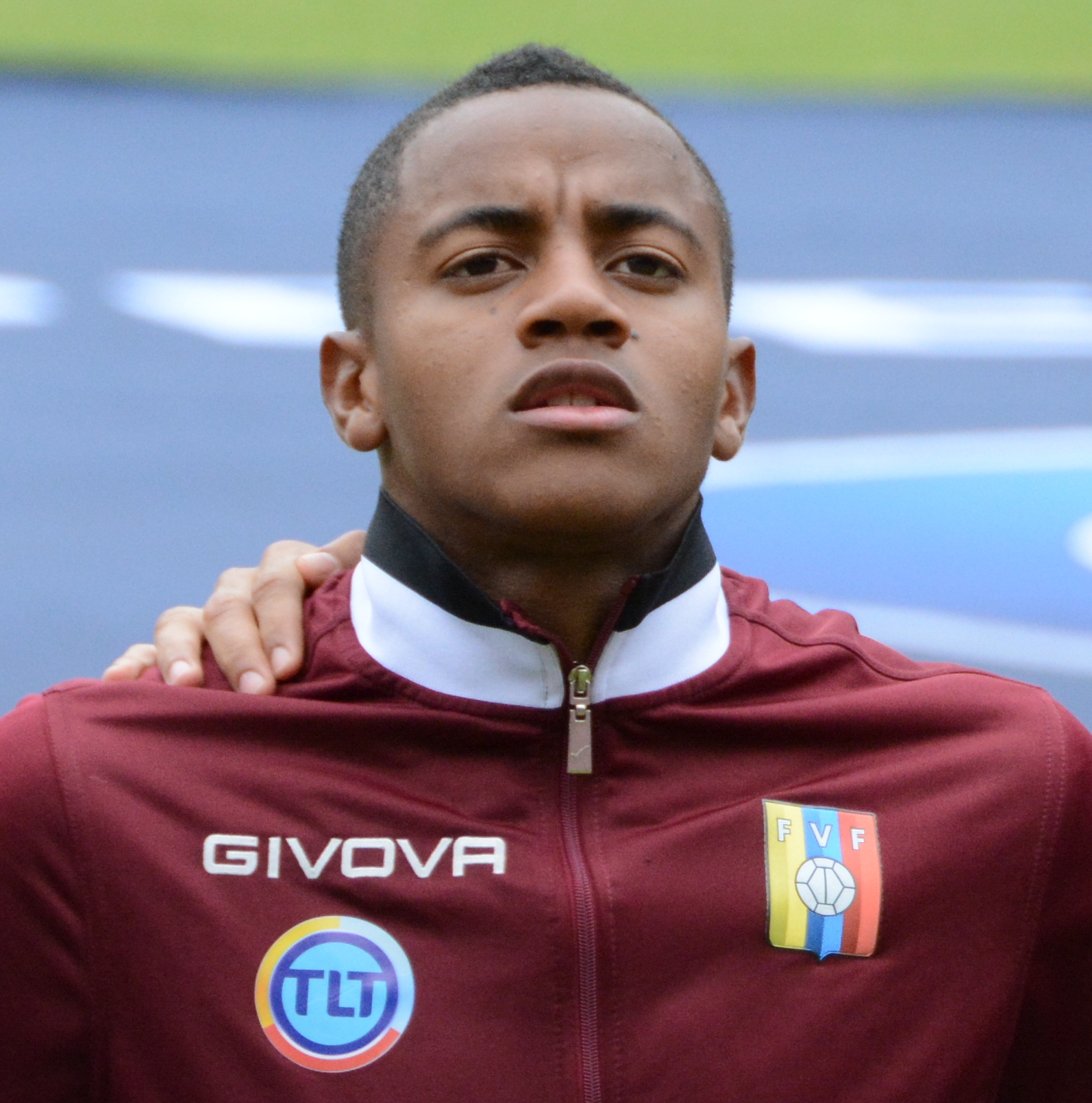
- Faríñez with Venezuela in 2019

Personal information
- Full name: Wuilker Faríñez Aray
- Date of birth: 15 February 1998 (age 28)
- Place of birth: Caracas, Venezuela
- Height: 1.80 m (5 ft 11 in)
- Position: Goalkeeper

Team information
- Current team: Internacional de Bogotá
- Number: 1

Youth career
- Nueva Esparta
- Gramoven
- 2011–2014: Caracas

Senior career*
| Years | Team | Apps | (Gls) |
| 2014–2017 | Caracas | 76 | (0) |
| 2018–2021 | Millonarios | 73 | (0) |
| 2020 | → Lens B (loan) | 1 | (0) |
| 2020–2021 | → Lens (loan) | 4 | (0) |
| 2021–2024 | Lens | 14 | (0) |
| 2024–2025 | Caracas | 21 | (0) |
| 2025 | Águilas Doradas | 30 | (0) |
| 2026- | Internacional de Bogotá | 11 | (0) |

International career^{‡}
| 2013 | Venezuela U15 | 2 | (0) |
| 2015 | Venezuela U17 | 4 | (0) |
| 2017 | Venezuela U20 | 16 | (1) |
| 2016– | Venezuela | 42 | (0) |
Medal record
Men's football
Representing Venezuela
FIFA U-20 World Cup
| Runner-up | 2017 |
South American U-20 Championship
| Third place | 2017 |
- * Club domestic league appearances and goals as of 16 March 2026 ‡ National team caps and goals as of 23:21, 18 November 2025 (UTC)

Wuilker Faríñez Aray (born 15 February 1998) is a Venezuelan professional footballer who plays as a goalkeeper for Colombian club Internacional de Bogotá and the Venezuela national team.

== Club career ==
=== Caracas ===
Born in Caracas, Faríñez joined Caracas FC's youth setup in 2011. On 12 June 2013, he signed a three-year professional deal with the club, being promoted to the main squad. After Alain Baroja left Caracas FC, Faríñez became the first-choice goalkeeper of the club for the 2015 Torneo Adecuación despite being only 17 years old at the time. On 30 August, he established a new record at the club after playing 689 minutes without conceding a goal.

After great performances during the tournament, he was chosen again as first-choice for 2016 Venezuelan Primera División season. In February 2016, he started for Caracas FC in a 2016 Copa Libertadores first stage match against Huracán, and put in a brilliant performance, only allowing one goal and keeping his team's chances of advancing to the second stage alive. Despite his efforts, Caracas was eliminated from the competition after a last-minute goal by Huracán in the second leg match.

On 14 December, Faríñez was included in the AUFP Venezuela's Team of the Season, as the 2016 Venezuelan Primera División season's best goalkeeper.

=== Millonarios ===
On 12 September 2017, Faríñez signed for Colombian club Millonarios. He joined the club on 1 January 2018. Faríñez made his debut for Millonarios during the first leg of the 2018 Superliga Colombiana, playing for the full ninety minutes in the 0–0 tie against Atlético Nacional. On the second leg he made a crucial save in a 1–2 win that gave him his first career championship.

On 9 March 2019, Faríñez made an excellent triple save against Atlético Nacional. The match ended 1–1, with Faríñez's actions being publicized on several European popular networks, such as Talksport.

=== Lens ===
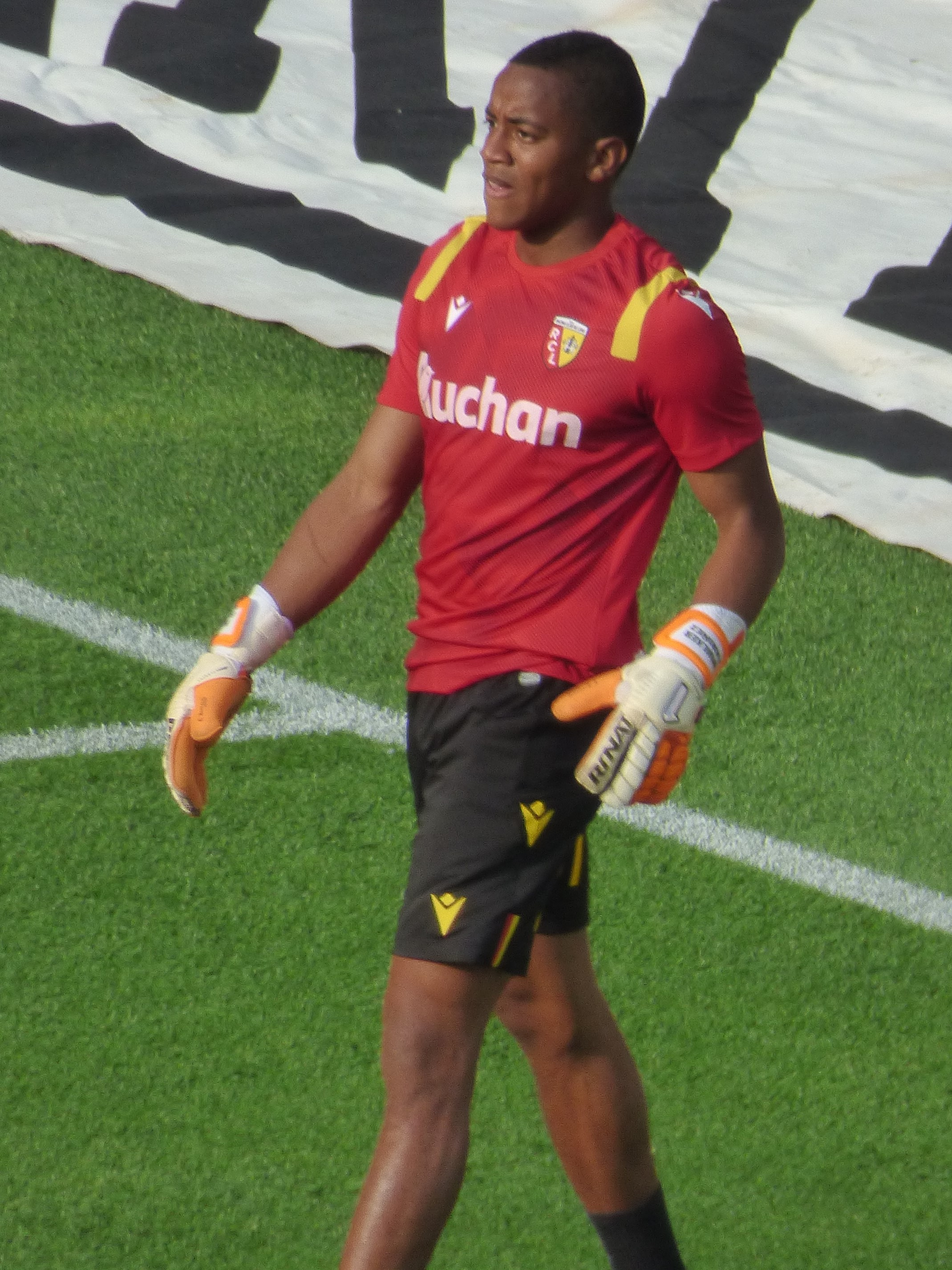
Faríñez with Lens in 2020

On 24 June 2020, Faríñez was loaned to French club Lens, following their promotion from Ligue 2. After arriving in Lens on 12 July 2020, Faríñez tested positive for COVID-19. The club ordered him to stay in quarantine for 14 days. During his season on loan at the club, he made five appearances for the first team and one appearance for the reserve team of the club. In May 2021, he signed a contract with Lens until 2024.

On 18 January 2024, Faríñez contract with Lens was terminated by mutual consent, six months before it was set to expire.

=== Return to Caracas ===
On 31 January 2024, Faríñez returned to his youth club, Caracas FC, on a one-year deal.

=== Return to Colombia ===
On 10 March 2025, Faríñez returned to Colombia, joining Primera A club Águilas Doradas, signing a contract through the 2025 season. On 9 January 2026, he joined fellow rival Internacional de Bogotá, signing a one-year contract.

== International career ==
=== Youth career ===
Faríñez has represented Venezuela at all youth levels, from the under-15 side to the under-20 side. He started the 2013 South American Under-15 Football Championship as the first-choice goalkeeper in the opening match against Colombia and conceded four goals on a 2–4 defeat for Venezuela. Faríñez was an un-used substitute in the next game against Brazil. He returned to the starting line-up for the game against Uruguay in which he conceded four goals again on the third defeat in a row for the Venezuelan team. He ended the tournament playing two games of the possible four and conceding eight goals.

Faríñez was the first-choice goalkeeper of the under-17 side for the 2015 South American Under-17 Football Championship, having a great performance against Brazil saving the team in a lot of occasions and securing a 3–2 come-back victory. He played four games, conceding eight goals that proved crucial as Venezuela was eliminated in the group stage on goal difference.

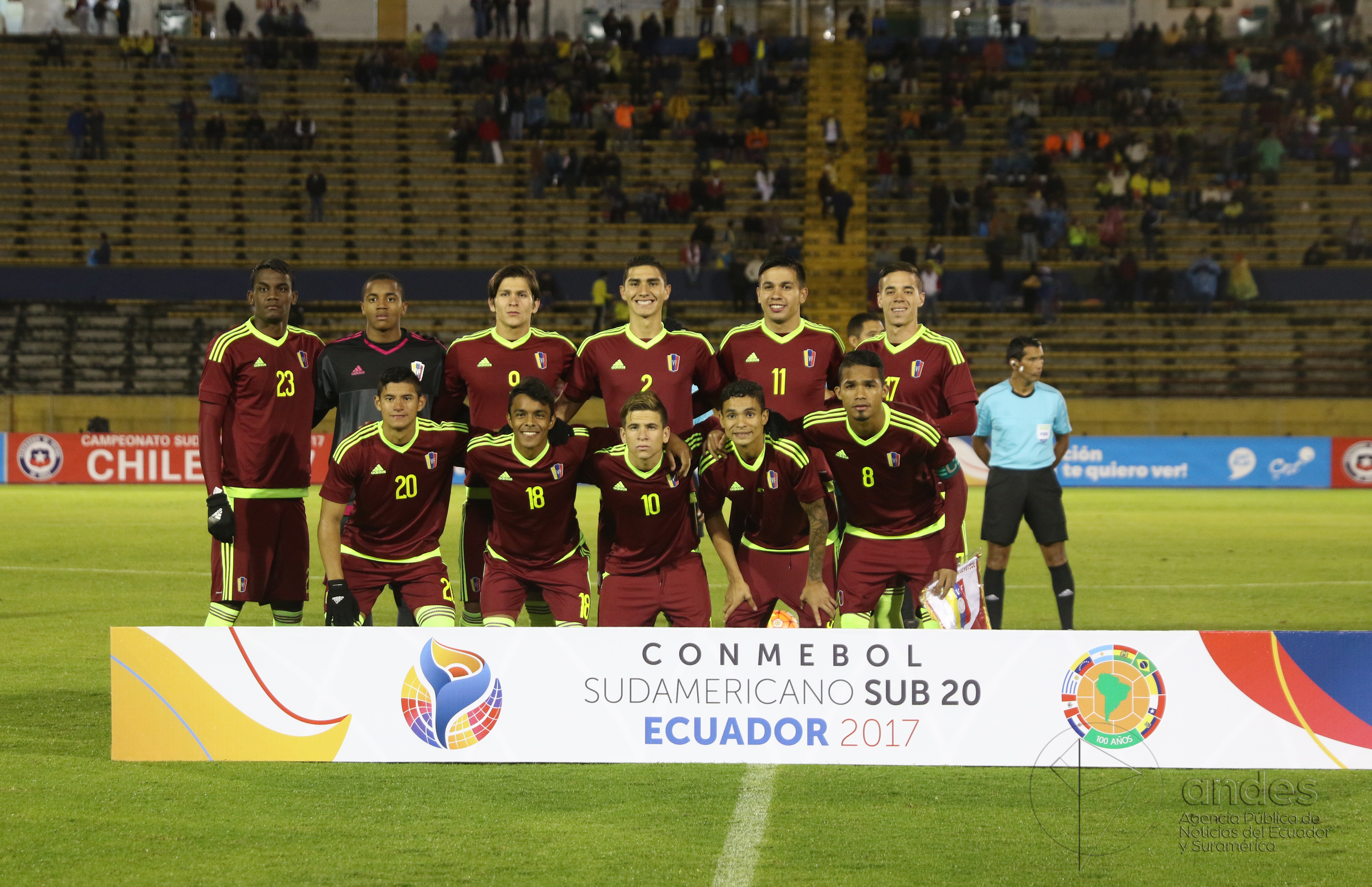
Faríñez (left to right; second in the top row) with the Venezuela U20 national team before a match against Ecuador at the 2017 South American U-20 Championship

Faríñez started in the opening match of the 2017 South American Youth Football Championship for the under-20 side playing against Uruguay, saving a penalty and keeping a clean sheet in a 0–0 draw. Faríñez started all nine games for Venezuela conceding only six goals, being the less scored goalkeeper of the tournament as they qualified to the 2017 FIFA U-20 World Cup.

At the 2017 FIFA U-20 World Cup, he started all of his team games. Faríñez scored from the penalty spot in a 7–0 group stage win against Vanuatu becoming the first goalkeeper to score in a FIFA U-20 World Cup. Faríñez didn't allow a goal until quarter-finals against United States in extra-time, for a total 506 minutes unbeaten, the second longest consecutive run without conceding a goal at the U-20 World Cup. In the semi-finals against Uruguay, Faríñez made four crucial saves during the game and stopped two shots in the penalty shootout to send Venezuela to their first FIFA tournament final ever. In the World Cup final Faríñez again had a great performance for Venezuela but eventually allowed a goal, the only one in the match as Venezuela lost the final. Faríñez ended the tournament allowing only 3 goals in 7 games tying as the less scored goalkeeper of the tournament.

=== Senior team ===
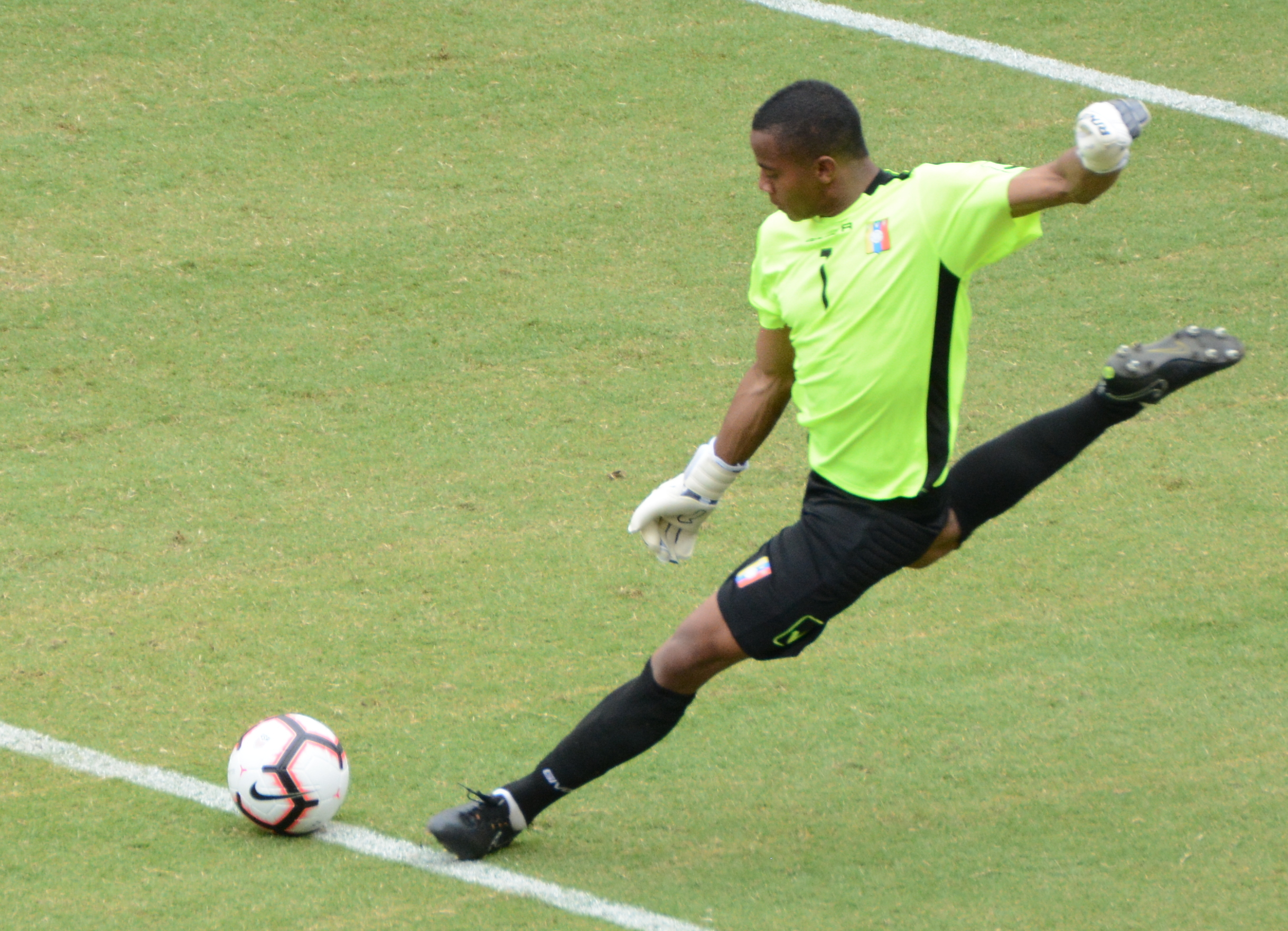
Faríñez playing for Venezuela in 2019

Despite his young age, Faríñez was called up by the Venezuela national football team's coach Noel Sanvicente to play in the 2015 Copa América, being recognized for his great talent by the press and signaled as the future goalkeeper of the national team and becoming the youngest player of that tournament. Despite being called for the national team continuously he never made his debut under Sanvicente's era.

He earned his first cap on 20 May 2016 in an unofficial game against Galicia, also being the first game of the team under the lead of new coach Rafael Dudamel, Faríñez allowed one goal and the game ended in a 1–1 draw. He made his official debut for the national team on 24 May 2016 when Venezuela faced Panama, he didn't allow goals and became the youngest player in the national team's history to keep a clean sheet. He made the final list for the Copa América Centenario.

He played his first official match for the senior team in a 2018 FIFA World Cup qualification game against Peru on 23 March 2017, becoming the youngest goalkeeper to play for Venezuela in a World Cup qualification. The game ended in a 2–2 draw with Faríñez delivering a stellar performance. After the match, coach and former national team goalie Rafael Dudamel, said ¨Venezuela has a goalkeeper for the next 20 years¨, with the press acknowledging that Faríñez ¨shined¨. On his second World Cup qualification game against Chile Faríñez again had a great performance despite allowing 3 goals, he saved the team in several opportunities and stopped a penalty kick from Alexis, becoming the youngest goalkeeper to do so for the national team.

After the international break, he kept a clean sheet in a 0–0 draw against Colombia on 31 August 2017. On 6 September, he put in a solid performance as Venezuela drew 1–1 with Argentina. Later on, in early October, he would go on to keep 2 more clean sheets in a 0–0 draw against Uruguay and a 1–0 win against Paraguay, the latter of which was his first competitive international win. Despite this Venezuela failed to qualify for the World Cup

During 2018, he would go on to play 3 international friendly matches. The first of which would be a last gasp loss to Colombia 2–1 at the Hard Rock Stadium, located in Miami Gardens, just north of Miami. They later on beat the United Arab Emirates 2–0 and drew against Iran 1–1. During March 2019, Venezuela played their first matches of 2019. The first one was against Argentina. Faríñez put in an extremely solid performance as Venezuela beat Argentina 3–1, on Lionel Messi's first match back from his second international retirement. The second match was unofficial, as Venezuela played against Catalonia's national team. Only 4 nations in the world recognize Catalonia, one of which is Venezuela, which led to Venezuela playing the match. Venezuela lost 2–1 to Catalonia during that match.

==== 2019 Copa América ====
Faríñez was the starting goalkeeper for the 2019 Copa América. He kept two clean-sheets in 0–0 draws against Peru and Brazil. In the third group match game against Bolivia the team received their first goal, ending a 262 minutes run without conceding a goal, the game ended in a 1–3 win. Venezuela finished as second of the group behind Brazil and faced Argentina at the quarter-final, they lost the game 0–2 being knocked out of the tournament.

== Career statistics ==
=== Club ===
As of match played 16 March 2026

Appearances and goals by club, season and competition
| Club | Season | League | | | Cup | | Continental (Note: Includes Copa Libertadores and Copa Sudamericana.) | | Other (Note: Includes Superliga Colombiana.) | | Total | |
| Club | Season | Division | Apps | Goals | Apps | Goals | Apps | Goals | Apps | Goals | Apps | Goals |
|---|---|---|---|---|---|---|---|---|---|---|---|---|
| Caracas | 2014–15 | Venezuelan Primera División | 0 | 0 | 1 | 0 | 0 | 0 | — | | 1 | 0 |
| Caracas | 2015 | Venezuelan Primera División | 20 | 0 | 3 | 0 | 0 | 0 | — | | 23 | 0 |
| Caracas | 2016 | Venezuelan Primera División | 32 | 0 | 1 | 0 | 2 | 0 | — | | 35 | 0 |
| Caracas | 2017 | Venezuelan Primera División | 24 | 0 | 1 | 0 | 1 | 0 | — | | 26 | 0 |
| Caracas | Total | | 76 | 0 | 6 | 0 | 3 | 0 | 0 | 0 | 85 | 0 |
| Millonarios | 2018 | Categoría Primera A | 33 | 0 | 3 | 0 | 10 | 0 | 2 | 0 | 48 | 0 |
| Millonarios | 2019 | Categoría Primera A | 34 | 0 | 1 | 0 | 0 | 0 | 0 | 0 | 35 | 0 |
| Millonarios | 2020 | Categoría Primera A | 6 | 0 | 0 | 0 | 2 | 0 | 0 | 0 | 8 | 0 |
| Millonarios | Total | | 73 | 0 | 4 | 0 | 12 | 0 | 2 | 0 | 91 | 0 |
| Lens B (loan) | 2020–21 | Championnat National 2 | 1 | 0 | — | | — | | — | | 1 | 0 |
| Lens (loan) | 2020–21 | Ligue 1 | 3 | 0 | 2 | 0 | — | | — | | 5 | 0 |
| Lens | 2021–22 | Ligue 1 | 13 | 0 | 2 | 0 | — | | — | | 15 | 0 |
| Caracas | 2024 | Liga FUTVE | 18 | 0 | 1 | 0 | 5 | 0 | — | | 24 | 0 |
| Caracas | 2025 | Liga FUTVE | 3 | 0 | 0 | 0 | — | | — | | 3 | 0 |
| Caracas | Total | | 21 | 0 | 1 | 0 | 5 | 0 | 0 | 0 | 27 | 0 |
| Águilas Doradas | 2025 | Categoría Primera A | 30 | 0 | 0 | 0 | — | | — | | 30 | 0 |
| Inter Bogotá | 2026 | Categoría Primera A | 11 | 0 | 0 | 0 | — | | — | | 11 | 0 |
| Career total | | | 228 | 0 | 15 | 0 | 20 | 0 | 2 | 0 | 265 | 0 |

=== International ===
As of 18 November 2025

Appearances and goals by national team and year
| National team | Year | Apps | Goals |
|---|---|---|---|
| Venezuela | 2016 | 1 | 0 |
| Venezuela | 2017 | 7 | 0 |
| Venezuela | 2018 | 3 | 0 |
| Venezuela | 2019 | 11 | 0 |
| Venezuela | 2020 | 4 | 0 |
| Venezuela | 2021 | 9 | 0 |
| Venezuela | 2022 | 5 | 0 |
| Venezuela | 2025 | 2 | 0 |
| Total | | 42 | 0 |

== Honours ==
Millonarios

- Superliga Colombiana: 2018

Venezuela U20

- FIFA U-20 World Cup: Runner-up 2017
- South American Youth Football Championship: Third Place 2017

Individual

- Best Venezuelan Primera División Goalkeeper: 2016, 2017
- Best save of the 2019 Copa América

Records

- Longest consecutive run without conceding a goal at Caracas (689 minutes from 2015).
- Youngest Goalkeeper to keep a clean sheet for Venezuela (at age 18 and 3 months in 2016).
- Longest consecutive run without conceding a goal for Venezuela under-20 (552 minutes from 2017 South American Youth Football Championship and 2017 FIFA U-20 World Cup).
- Greatest number of clean sheets kept for Venezuela under-20 in a South American Youth Football Championship (4 clean sheets from 2017).
- Youngest goalkeeper to play for Venezuela in a FIFA World Cup qualification game (19 years and 36 days from 2017).
- Youngest goalkeeper to stop a penalty for Venezuela (19 years and 41 days from 2017).
- First goalkeeper ever to score at the FIFA U-20 World Cup (from 2017).
- Third longest consecutive run without conceding a goal for a goalkeeper in the FIFA U-20 World Cup (507 minutes from 2017).
- Youngest Goalkeeper to keep a clean sheet for Venezuela in a FIFA World Cup qualification game (at age 19, 6 months and 16 days in 2017).
- Longest consecutive run without conceding a goal for Venezuela in a FIFA World Cup qualification (213 minutes from 2017).
