= 2025 Atlético Nacional season =

Atlético Nacional
2025 season
- Owner: Organización Ardila Lülle
- Chairman: Sebastián Arango Botero
- Manager: Javier Gandolfi
- Stadium: Estadio Atanasio Girardot
- Categoría Primera A: 3rd
- Superliga Colombiana: Winners
- Copa Libertadores: Round of 16
- Top goalscorer: Edwin Cardona; Kevin Viveros (5)
Home colours	Away colours	Third colours
- All statistics correct as of 19 August 2025.

The 2025 season is Atlético Nacional's 78th year in existence and the club's 16th consecutive season in the top flight of Colombian football. In addition to competing in the Categoría Primera A, the club will participate in the Copa Colombia and the Copa Libertadores. In the 2025-I season, Atlético Nacional drew the highest average home league attendance with 34,231, followed by Independiente Medellín with 29,010 and Millonarios FC with 26,634.

== Transfers ==
=== First team ===
As of 2 February 2025

Note: Flags indicate national team as defined under FIFA eligibility rules; some limited exceptions apply. Players may hold more than one non-FIFA nationality.

No.	Pos.	Nation	Player
1	GK	COL	David Ospina (captain)
3	DF	COL	Juan Felipe Aguirre
5	MF	COL	Kilian Toscano
6	DF	COL	Andrés Román
7	FW	COL	Faber Gil
8	MF	COL	Mateus Uribe
9	FW	COL	Alfredo Morelos (on loan from Santos)
10	MF	COL	Edwin Cardona
11	FW	ECU	Billy Arce
13	DF	URU	Camilo Cándido (on loan from Cruz Azul)
15	GK	COL	Harlen Castillo
16	DF	COL	William Tesillo
17	DF	COL	Andrés Salazar
18	FW	COL	Marino Hinestroza
19	FW	COL	Kevin Viveros (on loan from Sarajevo)

No.	Pos.	Nation	Player
20	DF	COL	Joan Castro (on loan from La Equidad)
21	MF	COL	Jorman Campuzano (on loan from Boca Juniors)
23	DF	COL	Juan José Arias
25	GK	COL	Luis Marquinez
26	MF	COL	Elkin Rivero
27	FW	COL	Dairon Asprilla
28	DF	COL	Simón García
29	FW	COL	Andrés Sarmiento
30	MF	COL	Kevin Parra
31	MF	COL	Juan Pablo Torres
32	MF	COL	Sebastián Guzmán
33	DF	COL	Royer Caicedo
34	GK	COL	Mateo Valencia
37	FW	COL	Jayder Asprilla
80	MF	COL	Juan Manuel Zapata (on loan from Envigado)

=== In ===
Pos.	Player	Transferred from	Fee	Date	Source
MF	(Ecuador) Billy Arce	(Brazil) Santos	Free	8 January 2025	
MF	(Colombia) Faber Gil	(Colombia) Deportivo Pereira	Loan	15 January 2025	
MF	(Colombia) Mateus Uribe	(Qatar) Al Sadd	Free	16 January 2025	
DF	(Uruguay) Camilo Cándido	(Mexico) Cruz Azul	Loan	22 January 2025	
FW	(Colombia) Marino Hinestroza	(United States) Columbus Crew	$1,500,000	1 February 2025	
DF	(Colombia) César Haydar	(Japan) Kawasaki Frontale	Loan	17 July 2025	
MF	(Argentina) Juan Bauza	(Romania) FC U Craiova 1948	Loan	27 July 2025	
FW	(Colombia) Marlos Moreno	(Spain) CD Tenerife	Free	28 July 2025	

== Friendlies ==
=== Pre-season ===
16 January 2025 Friendly	Atlético Nacional (Colombia)	2–1	(Venezuela) Monagas

== Competitions ==
=== Overall ===
Competition	First match	Last match	Starting round	Final position	Record							
Competition	First match	Last match	Starting round	Final position	Pld	W	D	L	GF	GA	GD	Win %
Categoría Primera A	25 January 2025		Matchday 1	4th	52	24	16	12	87	57	+30	46.15
Copa Colombia				Winner	10	7	3	0	20	5	+15	70.00
Superliga Colombiana	29 January 2025	6 February 2025	Final	Winners	2	0	2	0	1	1	+0	0.00
Copa Libertadores	2 April 2025	19 August 2025	Group stage	Round of 16	8	3	2	3	8	7	+1	37.50
Total					72	34	23	15	116	70	+46	47.22

Last updated: 19 August 2025
Source: Competitions

=== Categoría Primera A ===
==== Torneo Apertura ====
Pos	Team	Pld	W	D	L	GF	GA	GD	Pts	Qualification
3	Junior	20	10	7	3	26	16	+10	37	Advance to the semi-finals
4	Deportes Tolima	20	10	6	4	30	19	+11	36	Advance to the semi-finals
5	Atlético Nacional	20	10	5	5	37	21	+16	35	Advance to the semi-finals
6	Santa Fe	20	9	6	5	28	23	+5	33	Advance to the semi-finals
7	Once Caldas	20	10	3	7	26	22	+4	33	Advance to the semi-finals

Source: Dimayor, Soccerway
Rules for classification: 1) Points, 2) Goal difference, 3) Goals for, 4) Away goals for, 5) Away goals against, 6) Yellow cards, 7) Red cards, 8) Drawing of lots.

===== Results by round =====
Round	1	2	3	4	5	6	7	8	9	10	11	12	13	14	15
Ground	H	A	H	A	H	A	A	H	A	H	A	H	A	H	A
Result	W	W	W	D	W	L	W	W	D	D	L	W	D	W	L
Position															

Updated to match(es) played on 20 April 2025. Source:
A = Away; H = Home; W = Win; D = Draw; L = Loss

===== Matches =====
The match schedule was released on 7 January 2025.

25 January 2025 1	Atlético Nacional	4–0	Once Caldas	Medellín
				Stadium: Estadio Atanasio Girardot

2 February 2025 2	La Equidad	0–1	Atlético Nacional

9 February 2025 3	Atlético Nacional	3–0	Deportivo Pereira	Medellín
20:30 UTC−5				Stadium: Estadio Atanasio Girardot

12 February 2025 4	Independiente Santa Fe	2–2	Atlético Nacional
20:35 UTC−5

23 February 2025 6	Alianza	3–2	Atlético Nacional
16:00 UTC−5

4 March 2025 7	Fortaleza CEIF	1–5	Atlético Nacional
20:30 UTC−5

9 March 2025 8	Atlético Nacional	1–0	América de Cali	Medellín
19:45 UTC−5				Stadium: Estadio Atanasio Girardot

15 March 2025 9	Envigado	0–0	Atlético Nacional	Envigado
14:00 UTC−5				Stadium: Estadio Polideportivo Sur

19 March 2025 5	Atlético Nacional	4–3	Deportes Tolima	Medellín
20:30 UTC−5				Stadium: Estadio Atanasio Girardot

23 March 2025 10	Atlético Nacional	1–1	Independiente Medellín	Medellín
17:45 UTC−5				Stadium: Estadio Atanasio Girardot

28 March 2025 11	Atlético Bucaramanga	2–0	Atlético Nacional	Bucaramanga
19:30 UTC−5

5 April 2025 12	Atlético Nacional	1–0	Unión Magdalena	Medellín
14:00 UTC−5				Stadium: Estadio Atanasio Girardot

13 April 2025 13	Millonarios	0–0	Atlético Nacional	Bogotá
18:00 UTC−5				Stadium: Estadio El Campín

16 April 2025 14	Atlético Nacional	4–1	Boyacá Chicó	Medellín
18:20 UTC−5	Hinestroza 45+3'; Sarmiento 47'; Arce 63'; Morelos 87'		Lozano 90+2'	Stadium: Estadio Atanasio Girardot

20 April 2025 15	Deportivo Cali	1–0	Atlético Nacional	Palmira
18:20				Stadium: Estadio Deportivo Cali

30 April 2025 16	Atlético Nacional	3–0	Deportivo Pasto

4 May 2025 17	Independiente Medellín	1–1	Atlético Nacional

12 May 2025 18	Atlético Nacional	2–1	Llaneros

18 May 2025 19	Águilas Doradas	2–1	Atlético Nacional

=== Superliga Colombiana ===
29 January 2025 First leg	Atlético Nacional	1–1	Atlético Bucaramanga	Medellín
19:30 UTC−5	Arce (yellow card) 58'; Asprilla 60'; Aguirre (yellow card) 67'; Cardona (yellow card) 88'		Fabry 4'; Ponce (yellow card) 30'; Zárate (yellow card) 45+2'; Hinestroza (yellow card) 45+1' (red card) 45+7'; Quintana (yellow card) 50'	Stadium: Estadio Atanasio Girardot; Attendance: 42,130; Referee: Diego Ruiz

6 February 2025 Second leg	Atlético Bucaramanga	0–0 (1–1 agg.) (3–4 p)	Atlético Nacional	Bucaramanga
19:30 UTC−5	Henao (yellow card) 9'; Gutierrez (red card) 21'; Jiménez (yellow card) 64'; Mena (yellow card) 68'; Sambueza (yellow card) 86'		Morelos (yellow card) 13'; Salazar (yellow card) 29'; Hinestroza (yellow card) 45+1'; Campuzano (yellow card) 57'; Viveros (yellow card) 90+1'	Stadium: Estadio Américo Montanini; Attendance: 25,000; Referee: Carlos Ortega
	Penalties
	Henao (penalty missed); Mena (penalty scored); Sambueza (penalty scored); Fabry (penalty scored); Castañeda (penalty missed)		(penalty scored) Cardona; (penalty scored) Tesillo; (penalty missed) Zapata; (penalty scored) Uribe; (penalty scored) Hinestroza

=== Copa Libertadores ===
==== Group stage ====
The draw took place on 17 March 2025.

Pos	Team	Pld	W	D	L	GF	GA	GD	Pts	Qualification
1	(Brazil) Internacional	6	3	2	1	12	8	+4	11	Advance to round of 16
2	(Colombia) Atlético Nacional	6	3	0	3	7	6	+1	9	Advance to round of 16
3	(Brazil) Bahia	6	2	1	3	5	7	−2	7	Transfer to Copa Sudamericana
4	(Uruguay) Nacional	6	2	1	3	7	10	−3	7	

Source: CONMEBOL
Rules for classification: 1) Points; 2) Goal difference; 3) Goals scored; 4) Away goals scored; 5) CONMEBOL ranking.

2 April 2025 1	Atlético Nacional (Colombia)	3–0	(Uruguay) Nacional	Medellín
21:00 UTC−5	Hinestroza 45+2'; Viveros 55'; Morelos 72'			Stadium: Estadio Atanasio Girardot; Attendance: 40,083; Referee: Yael Falcón Pérez (Argentina)

10 April 2025 2	Internacional (Brazil)	3–0	(Colombia) Atlético Nacional	Porto Alegre, Brazil
19:00 UTC−3	Alan Patrick 50' (pen.), 82' (pen.), 88'		Hinestroza (red card) 70'	Stadium: Estádio Beira-Rio; Attendance: 42,804; Referee: Felipe González (Chile)

24 April 2025 3	Bahia (Brazil)	1–0	(Colombia) Atlético Nacional	Salvador, Brazil
21:00 UTC−3	Willian José 71'			Stadium: Arena Fonte Nova

8 May 2025 4	Atlético Nacional (Colombia)	3–1	(Brazil) Internacional	Medellín
19:30 UTC−5				Stadium: Estadio Atanasio Girardot

14 May 2025 5	Atlético Nacional (Colombia)	1–0	(Brazil) Bahia	Medellín
17:00 UTC−5				Stadium: Estadio Atanasio Girardot

28 May 2025 6	Nacional (Uruguay)	1–0	(Colombia) Atlético Nacional	Montevideo, Uruguay
19:00 UTC−3	Oliva 88'	Report		Stadium: Estadio Gran Parque Central; Attendance: 22,978; Referee: Maximiliano Ramírez (Argentina)

==== Round of 16 ====
The draw for the round of 16 was held in 2 June, 12:00 PYST (UTC−3), at the CONMEBOL Convention Centre in Luque, Paraguay.

12 August 2025 First leg	Atlético Nacional (Colombia)	0–0	(Brazil) São Paulo	Medellín
21:30 UTC−3		Report		Stadium: Estadio Atanasio Girardot; Attendance: 40,048; Referee: Gustavo Tejera (Uruguay)

19 August 2025 Second leg	São Paulo (Brazil)	1–1 (1–1 agg.) (4–3 p)	(Colombia) Atlético Nacional	São Paulo, Brazil
21:30 UTC−3	André Silva 3'	Report	Morelos 70' (pen.)	Stadium: Morumbi; Attendance: 57,559; Referee: Maximiliano Ramírez (Argentina)
	Penalties
	Lucas Moura (penalty scored); Marcos Antônio (penalty missed); Luciano (penalty scored); Enzo Díaz (penalty scored); Cédric Soares (penalty scored)		(penalty missed) Uribe; (penalty scored) Campuzano; (penalty scored) Morelos; (penalty scored) Tesillo; (penalty missed) Hinestroza
