= Internacional de Bogotá =

Colombian football club

Inter Bogotá
- Full name: Internacional de Bogotá
- Nickname: Los Cóndores (The condors)
- Founded: 10 December 2025; 9 months ago
- Ground: Metropolitano de Techo
- Capacity: 10,000
- Owner: NX Football Colombia
- President: Nicolás Maya
- Head coach: Ricardo Valiño
- League: Categoría Primera A
- Website: interbogota.com
Home colours	Away colours	Third colours

Internacional de Bogotá is a Colombian professional football team based in Bogotá. It was founded on 10 December 2025 and plays in Categoría Primera A, the top-flight competition of Colombian football. It is the successor club to La Equidad, who competed in the league from 2007 to 2025 when it was rebranded following its acquisition by the American consortium Tylis–Porter Group.

== History ==
Internacional de Bogotá was founded by the American-based consortium Tylis–Porter Group, led by real estate investor Al Tylis and Club Necaxa executive Sam Porter, and also including other investors such as actors Eva Longoria, Ryan Reynolds, and Rob McElhenney, MLB pitcher Justin Verlander and his wife, model Kate Upton, and NYU professor and entrepreneur Scott Galloway, after they acquired the Categoría Primera A club La Equidad in early 2025. La Equidad were founded in 1982 by insurance company Seguros La Equidad, and following a successful stint in amateur football tournaments, joined Dimayor in 2003, entering the lower tier professional competition Categoría Primera B that same year. It promoted to Categoría Primera A at the end of the 2006 season and won the Copa Colombia in 2008, while also achieving three league runner-up finishes in the 2007 Finalización, 2010 Apertura, and 2011 Apertura tournaments.

Following the acquisition by the Tylis–Porter Group, it was confirmed that as part of the terms of the operation, Seguros La Equidad would retain the rights to the name La Equidad, as well as the colors and identity, and that the club would be subject to a rebranding ahead of the 2026 season in order to reflect that decision, with press reports informing that the new owners had registered Internacional de Bogotá as a tentative name. The 2025 season was the last season played by La Equidad, which ended placing last in the aggregate table. It played its final match on 12 November 2025, defeating Deportivo Pereira 4–0.

The club's new identity was officially presented on 10 December 2025, confirming Internacional de Bogotá as the new name for the club, and white, black, and gold as its new colors, replacing the green used by La Equidad. Internacional de Bogotá played its first league match on 17 January 2026, losing 3–0 away to América de Cali, whilst its first victory was six days later, defeating Cúcuta Deportivo 2–1 at home.

== Stadium ==
Like its predecessor club, Internacional de Bogotá play their home matches at Estadio Metropolitano de Techo in Bogotá, which has a capacity of 10,000 people.

== Players ==
=== Current squad ===
As of 3 October 2026

Note: Flags indicate national team as defined under FIFA eligibility rules; some limited exceptions apply. Players may hold more than one non-FIFA nationality.

No.	Pos.	Nation	Player
1	GK	VEN	Wuilker Faríñez
2	DF	VEN	Carlos Vivas (on loan from Deportivo Táchira)
3	DF	COL	Esteban Valencia
4	DF	COL	Mateo Rodas
5	MF	COL	Larry Vásquez (captain)
6	DF	COL	Miguel Amaya
7	MF	URU	Fabricio Sanguinetti
9	FW	PAR	Diego Duarte (on loan from Nacional Asunción)
10	MF	URU	Facundo Boné
11	FW	COL	Cristian Dájome
12	GK	COL	Juan Carrasco
13	DF	VEN	Miguel Pernía (on loan from Carabobo)
14	MF	COL	Mateo Santamaría
16	DF	COL	Yulián Gómez
17	MF	COL	Fabián Chaverra

No.	Pos.	Nation	Player
18	MF	COL	Emanuel Arboleda
19	FW	COL	Yéider García
20	DF	COL	Joan Castro
22	FW	COL	Sebastián Girado
23	MF	COL	Johan Caballero
24	MF	COL	Rubén Manjarrés
25	DF	COL	Ronaldo Julio
26	MF	ARG	Agustín Irazoque
27	FW	COL	Emilio Gutiérrez
28	FW	COL	Hather Cuesta (on loan from Necaxa)
29	DF	COL	Arnol Agualimpia
30	GK	COL	Simón Zapata
31	MF	COL	Deivid Castro
32	FW	COL	Jhon Palomeque
33	GK	COL	Kevin Cataño (on loan from Atlético Nacional)

=== Out on loan ===
Note: Flags indicate national team as defined under FIFA eligibility rules; some limited exceptions apply. Players may hold more than one non-FIFA nationality.

No.	Pos.	Nation	Player
—	DF	COL	Joao Abonía (at Cúcuta Deportivo)
—	DF	ESP	José Masllorens (at Unionistas de Salamanca)
—	MF	COL	Samir Mayo (at Cúcuta Deportivo)

No.	Pos.	Nation	Player
—	MF	COL	Brandon Quiñónez (at Tigres F.C.)
—	FW	COL	Bayron Caicedo (at Orsomarso)
