= Ricardo Valiño =

Argentine football coach (born 1971)

Personal information
- Full name: Ricardo Alfredo Valiño
- Date of birth: 2 January 1971 (age 55)
- Place of birth: Buenos Aires, Argentina
- Height: 1.79 m (5 ft 10 1/2 in)

Team information
- Current team: Internacional de Bogotá (manager)

Managerial career
- Years: Team
- 2011–2014: Venados
- 2014–2016: BUAP
- 2016–2017: Puebla
- 2017–2018: Celaya
- 2018–2020: Zacatepec
- 2020–2022: Atlético Morelia
- 2022–2023: Tijuana
- 2023: Venezuela U17
- 2023–2025: Venezuela U20
- 2023–2025: Venezuela U23
- 2026–: Internacional de Bogotá

Ricardo Alfredo Valiño (born 2 January 1971 in Buenos Aires) is an Argentine football coach. He is the current manager of Colombian club Internacional de Bogotá.

== Career ==
Valiño who never played professional football, started his career assisting Gabriel Orlando Rodriguez during his coaching stay with the academies of San Lorenzo, River Plate and Vélez Sarsfield.

He arrived at Venados at 2011, where he stayed until 2014, with a total of 104 games coached.

Since May 2014, started coaching BUAP. He was sacked in April 2016, after coaching a total of 80 games.

In April 2016 he was announced as new coach of Puebla of Liga MX.

On 25 April 2017, he was appointed manager of Celaya. On 4 July 2018, he was dismissed from the position after failing to obtain the requested results.

On 4 October 2018, he was appointed as manager of the Club Atlético Zacatepec. In December 2019, he was runner-up in the Torneo Apertura 2019. On 26 June 2020, the transfer of Club Atlético Zacatepec to Morelia was announced, the team was renamed Atlético Morelia and Valiño continued with his position in the new team.

On 14 March 2023, Valiño was announced by the Venezuelan Football Federation as head coach of the Venezuelan national teams U-20 and U-23 and internal head coach of the U-17 team to the South American U-17 Championship. On 8 February 2025, he was dismissed after the Venezuela U-20 team failed to advance to the final stage of the 2025 South American U-20 Championship.

On 21 December 2025, Valiño was announced as manager of Colombian club Internacional de Bogotá.

== Managerial statistics ==
As of 30 June 2020 (Note: Includes matches from Liga MX, Copa MX)

Team	Nat	From	To	Record				
Team	Nat	From	To	G	W	D	L	Win %
Mérida	(Mexico)	June 2011	May 2014	104	38	33	33	36.54
Lobos BUAP	(Mexico)	May 2014	April 2016	80	32	25	23	40.00
Puebla	(Mexico)	April 2016	January 2017	27	9	8	10	33.33
Celaya	(Mexico)	April 2017	July 2018	45	19	10	16	42.22
Zacatepec	(Mexico)	October 2018	June 2020	57	24	9	24	42.11
Atlético Morelia	(Mexico)	June 2020	May 2022	35	19	9	7	54.29
Total				350	141	95	114	40.29

== Honours ==
=== Manager ===
Atlético Morelia

- Liga de Expansión MX: Clausura 2022
