= Andrés Felipe Román =

Colombian footballer

Personal information
- Full name: Andrés Felipe Román Mosquera
- Date of birth: 5 October 1995 (age 31)
- Place of birth: Bogotá, Colombia
- Height: 1.83 m (6 ft 0 in)
- Position: Right-back

Team information
- Current team: Atlético Nacional
- Number: 6

Youth career
- 1999–2014: Sporting Cristal Colombia
- 2014–2017: Millonarios

Senior career*
Years	Team	Apps	(Gls)
2017–2022	Millonarios	98	(7)
2022–	Atlético Nacional	112	(17)

International career^{‡}
2022–2025	Colombia	3	(0)
- * Club domestic league appearances and goals as of 11 December 2025 ‡ National team caps and goals as of 23:17, 14 October 2025 (UTC)

Andrés Felipe Román Mosquera (born 5 October 1995) is a Colombian professional footballer who plays as a right-back for Atlético Nacional and the Colombia national team.

== Club career ==
Román is a youth product of Sporting Cristal Colombia, before moving to the youth academy of Millonarios in 2014. He was promoted to their senior team in 2017, and that year helped them win the 2017 Finalización. The following season, he won the 2018 Superliga Colombiana and played in his first international competition, as well as scoring his first goal. On 31 July 2019, he extended his contract with Millonarios until 2022. On 16 February 2022, Román accepted a move to the Argentine club Boca Juniors. 2 days later, he failed his medical with the club and returned to Millonarios. At Millonarios he had another examination, which rules out a genetic condition and allowed him to play professionally. On 15 June 2022, he transferred to Atlético Nacional on a 1-year contract with option to extend for 3 years. On 15 January 2023, his contract was extended until 2026.

== International career ==
Román was called up to the Colombia national team for a set of friendlies in February 2021. He debuted with them a year later, in a friendly 2–1 win over Honduras on 16 January 2022.

== Career statistics ==
=== International ===
As of match played 14 October 2025

Appearances and goals by national team and year
National team	Year	Apps	Goals
Colombia	2022	1	0
Colombia	2023	0	0
Colombia	2024	0	0
Colombia	2025	2	0
Total		3	0

== Honours ==
Millonarios

- Categoría Primera A: 2017 Finalización
- Superliga Colombiana: 2018

Atlético Nacional

- Categoría Primera A: 2022 Apertura, 2024 Finalización
- Superliga Colombiana: 2023
