= Juan Bauza =

Argentine footballer (born 1996)

Personal information
- Full name: Juan Francisco Bauza
- Date of birth: 3 May 1996 (age 30)
- Place of birth: Gualeguaychú, Argentina
- Height: 1.77 m (5 ft 10 in)
- Positions: Attacking midfielder; winger

Team information
- Current team: Levadiakos
- Number: 7

Youth career
- –2016: Central Entrerriano

Senior career*
Years	Team	Apps	(Gls)
2016–2020	Colón	4	(0)
2017–2018	→ Juventud Unida (loan)	18	(2)
2018–2019	→ Gimnasia y Esgrima (loan)	19	(1)
2019–2020	→ Górnik Zabrze (loan)	6	(0)
2020–2022	FK Csíkszereda	31	(7)
2021–2022	→ FC U Craiova (loan)	25	(5)
2022–2026	FC U Craiova	55	(11)
2024–2025	→ Baniyas (loan)	22	(3)
2025–2026	→ Atlético Nacional (loan)	25	(3)
2026–	Levadiakos	4	(0)
- * Club domestic league appearances and goals as of 13 September 2026

Juan Francisco "Pepe" Bauza (born 3 May 1996) is an Argentine professional footballer who plays as an attacking midfielder or a winger for Super League Greece club Levadiakos.

== Career ==
Bauza started his career with Argentine Primera División side Colón. His first appearance for the club came on 22 October 2016 in loss at home to Patronato. He made three further appearances in the 2016–17 season, prior to being loaned out for the following campaign to Juventud Unida.

He scored the first two goals of his senior career in April 2018 against Deportivo Riestra and Santamarina respectively. Bauza signed for fellow club Gimnasia y Esgrima on loan on 12 July 2018. One goal in twenty-two games followed, as they reached the promotion play-offs.

On 29 July 2019, Bauza headed to Poland to join Polish first division outfit Górnik Zabrze on a season-long loan; having trained since June. He made his bow in a league defeat away to Wisła Kraków on 5 August. Bauza played in the fourth tier on 11 August for their reserve team Górnik II Zabrze, notably scoring against Ruch Zdzieszowice in III liga.

On 17 February 2020, the Polish club confirmed that the loan deal had been terminated and that Bauza had joined Romanian club FK Csíkszereda. He had impressed the Romanian side whilst playing against them for the Polish outfit in a friendly match on 25 January.

Bauza scored five goals in eight friendlies upon joining Miercurea Ciuc, prior to making his competitive debut in Liga II during a 6–0 home loss to UTA Arad on 24 February. He initially signed for just six months, though soon extended his stay there for another twelve months.

In August 2022, FC U Craiova's president Adrian Mititelu rejected a €2 million bid from FCSB. On 14 September 2022, Bauza signed a contract extension, with his release clause set at €8 million.

== Personal life ==
Bauza's father, Marcelo, was also a footballer.

== Career statistics ==
As of match played 2 April 2026

Appearances and goals by club, season and competition
Club	Season	League			National cup (Note: Includes Copa Argentina, Polish Cup, Cupa României, UAE President's Cup and Copa Colombia)		League cup (Note: Includes UAE League Cup)		Continental		Other		Total	
Club	Season	Division	Apps	Goals	Apps	Goals	Apps	Goals	Apps	Goals	Apps	Goals	Apps	Goals
Colón	2016–17	Primera División	4	0	0	0	—		—		—		4	0
Juventud Unida (loan)	2017–18	Primera B Nacional	18	2	1	0	—		—		—		19	2
Gimnasia y Esgrima (loan)	2018–19	Primera B Nacional	19	1	1	0	—		—		2 (Note: Appearance(s) in the Primera B Nacional play-offs)	0	22	1
Górnik Zabrze (loan)	2019–20	Ekstraklasa	6	0	1	0	—		—		—		7	0
Górnik Zabrze II (loan)	2019–20	III liga, group III	7	1	—		—		—		—		7	1
FK Csíkszereda	2019–20	Liga II	3	0	0	0	—		—		—		3	0
FK Csíkszereda	2020–21	Liga II	28	7	1	0	—		—		—		29	7
FK Csíkszereda	Total		31	7	1	0	—		—		—		32	7
FC U Craiova (loan)	2021–22	Liga I	25	5	0	0	—		—		—		25	5
FC U Craiova	2022–23	Liga I	29	4	4	0	—		—		2 (Note: Appearance in Liga I European play-offs)	0	35	4
FC U Craiova	2023–24	Liga I	26	7	1	1	—		—		—		27	8
FC U Craiova	Total		80	16	5	1	—		—		2	0	87	17
Baniyas (loan)	2024–25	UAE Pro League	22	3	1	0	3	0	—		—		26	3
Atlético Nacional (loan)	2025	Categoría Primera A	19	2	6	1	—		2 (Note: Appearances in Copa Libertadores)	0	—		27	2
Atlético Nacional (loan)	2026	Categoría Primera A	6	1	0	0	—		1 (Note: Appearances in Copa Sudamericana)	0	—		7	1
Atlético Nacional (loan)	Total		25	3	6	1	—		3	0	—		34	4
Levadiakos (loan)	2026–27	Super League Greece	0	0	0	0	—		—		—		0	0
Career total			212	33	16	2	3	0	3	0	4	0	238	35

== Honours ==
Atlético Nacional

- Copa Colombia: 2025
