= Diego Moreno (footballer, born 1996) =

Colombian footballer (born 1996)

Personal information
- Full name: Diego Fernando Moreno Quintero
- Date of birth: 27 February 1996 (age 30)
- Place of birth: Apartadó, Colombia
- Height: 1.85 m (6 ft 1 in)
- Position: Midfielder

Team information
- Current team: Independiente Medellín
- Number: 31

Youth career
- Envigado

Senior career*
Years	Team	Apps	(Gls)
2015–2018	Envigado	44	(3)
2019	Atlético Huila	30	(5)
2019–2020	Marítimo	9	(0)
2020–2021	Marítimo B	12	(1)
2021–2023	Envigado	75	(8)
2023–	Independiente Medellín	85	(14)
- * Club domestic league appearances and goals as of 11 December 2025

Diego Fernando Moreno Quintero (born 27 February 1996), known as Diego Moreno, is a Colombian professional footballer who plays as a midfielder for Independiente Medellín.

== Club career ==
On 7 January 2020, Diego Moreno signed with Marítimo.
