= Yulián Gómez =

Colombian footballer (born 1997)

Personal information
- Full name: Yulián Andrés Gómez Mosquera
- Date of birth: 4 August 1997 (age 29)
- Place of birth: El Ortigal, Colombia
- Height: 1.70 m (5 ft 7 in)
- Position: Left-back

Team information
- Current team: Internacional de Bogotá
- Number: 16

Youth career
- 2014–2017: Independiente Medellín

Senior career*
Years	Team	Apps	(Gls)
2017–2023	Independiente Medellín	100	(2)
2018	→ Real Cartagena (loan)	35	(3)
2019	→ Unión Magdalena (loan)	37	(1)
2024–2025	Deportivo Cali	44	(1)
2025	La Equidad	20	(0)
2026–	Internacional de Bogotá	0	(0)
- * Club domestic league appearances and goals as of 12 December 2025

Yulián Andrés Gómez Mosquera (born 4 August 1997) is a Colombian footballer who plays as a left-back for Categoría Primera A side Internacional de Bogotá.

== Club career ==
=== Independiente Medellín ===
Gómez joined Independiente Medellín at the age of 16, after being scouted by Tucho Ortiz when he was playing in his hometown, Ortigal. The same coach, Tucho Ortiz, gave Gómez his professional debut for Independiente Medellín in the Categoría Primera B on 9 July 2017 against Millonarios. 19-year old Gómez was in the line up but was replaced in the 81st minute.

In the 2018 season, Gómez was on loan at Real Cartagena where he played 35 games and scored three goals in the Categoría Primera B and later on loan for Unión Magdalena in the 2019, where he played 37 games in the Categoría Primera A.

On 8 March 2020, Gómez got injured against Millonarios. Gómez broke his ankle and underwent his surgical procedure, where he was treated for a fibula fracture and an injury to the medial ligament. He was set to be out for five months.

=== Deportivo Cali ===
Ahead of the 2024 season, Gómez joined Deportivo Cali. The deal was already confirmed at the end of November 2023.

=== La Equidad ===
At the end of June 2025, Gómez joined La Equidad. In December 2025, the club was dissolved and replaced by a new entity, Internacional de Bogotá, following a takeover by new ownership.
