= Juan Nieva =

Colombian footballer (born 1999)

Personal information
- Full name: Juan Diego Nieva Guzmán
- Date of birth: 13 February 1999 (age 27)
- Place of birth: Cali, Colombia
- Height: 1.78 m (5 ft 10 in)
- Position: Midfielder

Team information
- Current team: Llaneros
- Number: 8

Youth career
- –2018: América de Cali

Senior career*
Years	Team	Apps	(Gls)
2018–2021	América de Cali	20	(0)
2020–2021	→ Šibenik (loan)	0	(0)
2022	Real Cartagena	25	(0)
2023–	Llaneros	9	(0)
- * Club domestic league appearances and goals as of 19:16, 9 April 2023 (UTC)

Juan Diego Nieva Guzmán (born 13 February 1999) is a Colombian footballer who currently plays as a midfielder for Llaneros.

== Career statistics ==
=== Club ===
As of 13 March 2021.

Club	Season	League			Cup		Continental		Other		Total	
Club	Season	Division	Apps	Goals	Apps	Goals	Apps	Goals	Apps	Goals	Apps	Goals
América de Cali	2018	Categoría Primera A	4	0	2 (Note: Appearances in the Copa Colombia)	0	0	0	0	0	6	0
América de Cali	2019	Categoría Primera A	15	0	3	0	0	0	0	0	18	0
América de Cali	2020	Categoría Primera A	1	0	0	0	0	0	0	0	1	0
América de Cali	2021	Categoría Primera A	0	0	0	0	0	0	0	0	0	0
América de Cali	Total		20	0	5	0	0	0	0	0	25	0
Šibenik (loan)	2020–21	1. HNL	0	0	0	0	–		0	0	0	0
Career total			20	0	5	0	0	0	0	0	25	0
