= Paulo Autuori =

Brazilian football manager

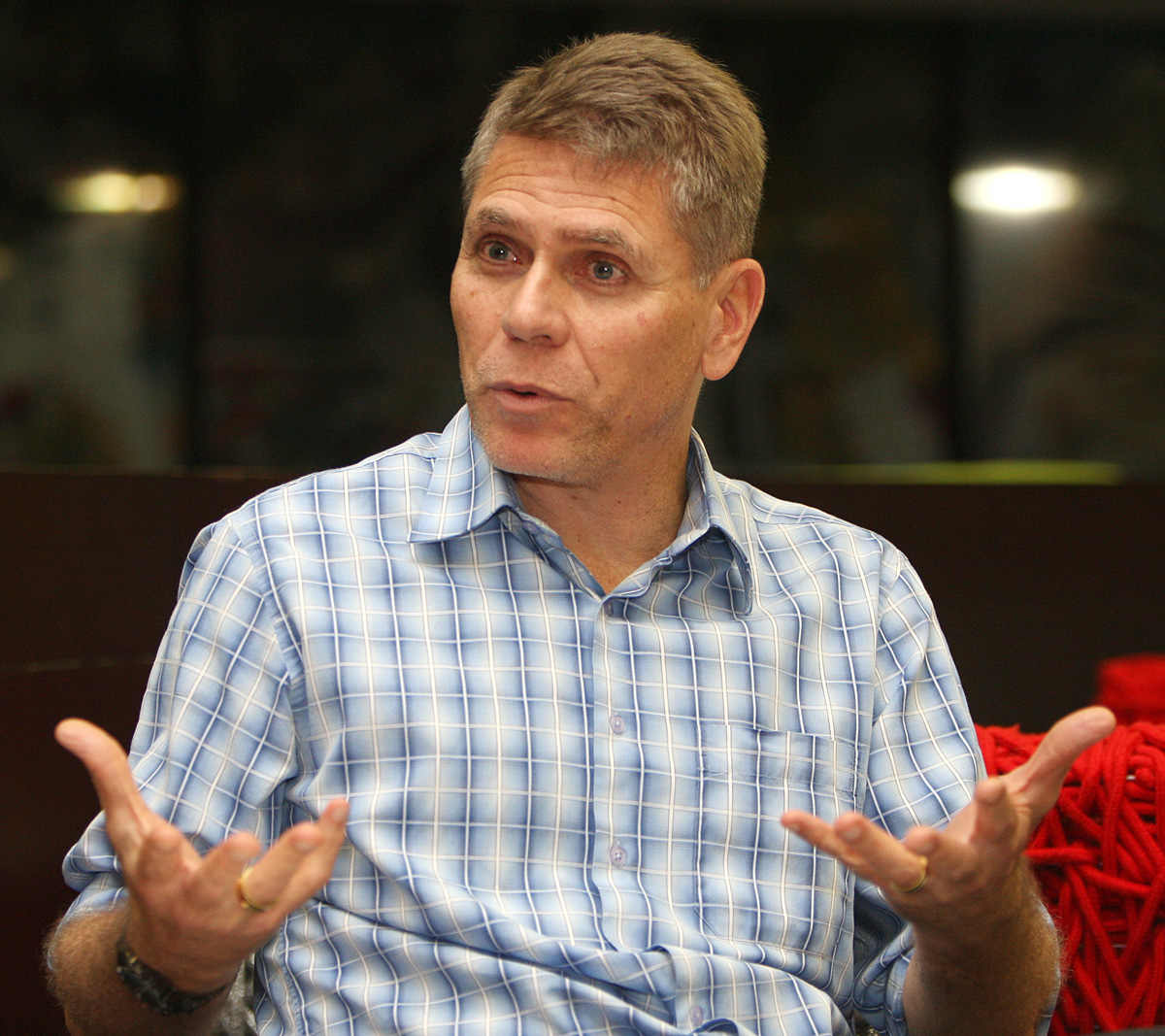
- Autuori in 2011

Personal information
- Full name: Paulo Autuori de Mello
- Date of birth: 25 August 1956 (age 70)
- Place of birth: Rio de Janeiro, Brazil

Managerial career
- Years: Team
- 1986–1987: Vitória Guimarães (assistant)
- 1987–1989: Nacional
- 1989–1990: Vitória Guimarães
- 1990–1993: Marítimo
- 1993–1995: Marítimo
- 1995: Botafogo
- 1996–1997: Benfica
- 1997: Cruzeiro
- 1997–1998: Flamengo
- 1998: Botafogo
- 1999: Internacional
- 1999: Santos
- 1999–2000: Cruzeiro
- 2000: Vitória Guimarães
- 2001: Alianza Lima
- 2001: Botafogo
- 2002: Sporting Cristal
- 2003–2005: Peru
- 2005: São Paulo
- 2006: Kashima Antlers
- 2007: Cruzeiro
- 2007–2009: Al-Rayyan
- 2009: Grêmio
- 2009–2011: Al-Rayyan
- 2011–2012: Qatar U23
- 2012–2013: Qatar
- 2013: Vasco da Gama
- 2013: São Paulo
- 2014: Atlético Mineiro
- 2015: Cerezo Osaka
- 2016–2017: Atlético Paranaense
- 2018: Ludogorets Razgrad
- 2019: Atlético Nacional
- 2020: Botafogo
- 2020–2021: Athletico Paranaense
- 2021: Athletico Paranaense (interim)
- 2022–2023: Atlético Nacional
- 2023: Cruzeiro (interim)
- 2025–2026: Sporting Cristal
- 2026: Fortaleza

Paulo Autuori de Mello (born 25 August 1956), known as Paulo Autuori, is a Brazilian football executive and coach.

== Early life ==
A football fan since early childhood and a futsal player, Autuori had to give up his dream of becoming a professional footballer after contracting poliomyelitis in his teens. The disease left him with an atrophied leg and a permanent limp on his walk, which prevented him from playing. However, he did not give up his dream of being part of the footballing world, and decided to learn other aspects of the game, specifically becoming a manager.

Autuori graduated in Physical Education at Universidade Castelo Branco; and attended a Sport Admninstration course at PUC-RJ and a Soccer Coach Course at UERJ.

== Coaching career ==
Autuori began his career as a fitness coach, working at Portuguesa-RJ, America-RJ, São Bento, Marília, Bonsuccesso and Botafogo before meeting Marinho Peres, who invited him as a part of his staff at Portuguese side Vitória de Guimarães in 1986. In 1987, he became manager of his own right, after being named at the helm of Nacional in the Segunda Divisão.

In 1989, after achieving promotion in his first year and a 10th-place finish in his second, Autuori returned to Vitória, now being appointed manager of the side. He left the club on 25 September 1990, after a 0–0 draw with Gil Vicente, and took over fellow top tier side Marítimo shortly after.

Autuori left the Leões do Almirante Reis in June 1993, but returned to the club in December, replacing compatriot Edinho. On 12 July 1995, shortly after leaving Marítimo, he returned to Botafogo as the head coach of the club, and led them to the 1995 Campeonato Brasileiro title.

On 26 December 1995, Autuori left Fogão and agreed to a contract with Benfica for the 1996–97 season. After officially taking over on 11 July 1996, he only lasted 23 matches before being sacked on 19 January 1997.

On 21 February 1997, Autuori was appointed Cruzeiro head coach, replacing Oscar Bernardi. In August, prior to the second leg of the 1997 Copa Libertadores finals, it was reported that he had agreed to a deal with Flamengo; after winning the title, he moved to the latter and led them to the 1997 Campeonato Brasileiro final stages.

On 12 March 1998, Autuori resigned from Flamengo, being replaced by Joel Santana, and returned to Botafogo fifteen days later. He left the latter on 26 September, and took over Internacional ahead of the 1999 season.

After resigning from Inter on 3 August 1999, Autuori replaced Émerson Leão at Santos twenty days later. On 24 November, however, he left the latter to return to Cruzeiro, but resigned from the club on 23 April 2000.

On 6 May 2000, Autuori returned to Portugal and Vitória, but resigned on 19 November following a 4–0 home loss to Benfica. On 3 July 2001, after a brief spell at Peruvian side Alianza Lima, he returned to Botafogo for a third spell, but also resigned on 13 October.

On 14 January 2002, Autuori returned to Peru after being appointed Sporting Cristal manager. On 6 January 2003, he was announced as the manager of the Peru national team.

Despite winning the opening match of the 2006 FIFA World Cup qualification (4–1 over Paraguay), Autuori left the nation on 25 April 2005, with the reasoning being that he declined to declare in front of a Congress, due to the Peru national team scandals. Four days later, he replaced Leão as head coach of São Paulo back in his home country.

Autuori won the 2005 Copa Libertadores and the 2005 FIFA Club World Championship with Tricolor, but left the club on 29 December 2005, after accepting an offer from Japanese club Kashima Antlers. He left Kashima on 1 December 2006, and agreed to return to Cruzeiro for his third spell at the club four days later.

Autuori resigned from Cruzeiro on 29 April 2007, after a 4–0 loss to rivals Atlético Mineiro in the first leg of the 2007 Campeonato Mineiro finals. He later moved to Qatar to manage Al-Rayyan, leaving the club in May 2009 after not renewing his contract.

On 14 May 2009, Autuori returned to his homeland after being announced as head coach of Grêmio. On 12 November, however, he left the club, and returned to Al-Rayyan nine days later; with the latter side, he resigned during the half-time of a match in February 2010, but opted to stay after a meeting afterwards.

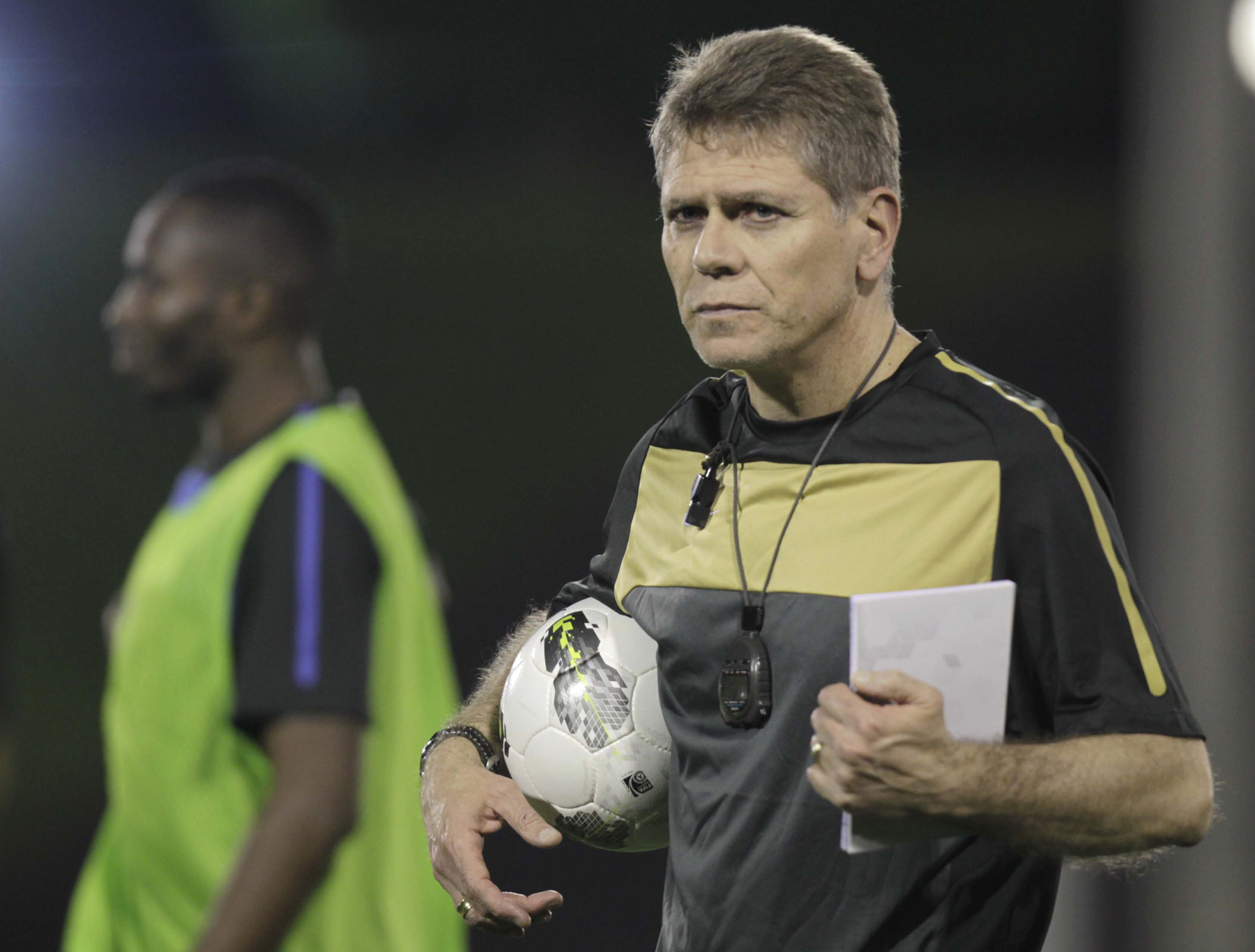
Autuori during a training session of the Qatar national team in 2012

On 27 August 2011, Autuori left Al-Rayyan to take over the Qatar under-23 team, replacing Frenchman Bernard Simondi. On 20 February 2012, despite failing to qualify for the 2012 Summer Olympics, he was confirmed as manager of the Qatar national team. He was fired by the QFA on 15 January 2013, after his side failed to qualify for the knockout round of the 2013 Gulf Cup.

Shortly after leaving Qatar, Autuori was hired by Vasco da Gama as their head coach on 23 March 2013. He resigned on 9 July 2013, and returned to São Paulo two days later.

On 9 September 2013, Autuori was sacked by São Paulo after a 2–0 loss against Coritiba, a result that kept the club in relegation zone of the 2013 Série A, and was replaced by Muricy Ramalho. On 20 December, he was announced by Atlético Mineiro's president Alexandre Kalil as the new head coach of the club for the 2014 season.

Sacked by Galo on 24 April 2014, Autuori returned to Japan on 20 December, after being announced as manager of Cerezo Osaka. After departing the club on 17 November 2015, he was named Atlético Paranaense head coach on 7 March of the following year.

On 23 May 2017, Autuori became a director of football at Furacão, after the club appointed Eduardo Baptista as head coach. He left the club on 28 November 2017, as his contract was due to expire, and joined Fluminense in the following month, also as a director; he left the latter on 28 May 2018.

On 5 June 2018, Autuori was announced as the new Director of football in the Bulgarian champion Ludogorets Razgrad, but on the next day he was presented as the new manager of the team, since Dimitar Dimitrov wanted to leave the club. He stepped down from his position in October 2018, citing personal reasons.

On 2 November 2018, Autuori moved to Colombia and was appointed manager of Atlético Nacional. He resigned the following 24 May, before becoming a director of football at Santos in July 2019.

After leaving Peixe at the end of the 2019 season, Autuori returned to coaching duties on 13 February 2020, after being presented back at Botafogo. Sacked on 1 October, he returned to Athletico on 22 October; initially a technical director, he was later named head coach for the remainder of the season.

Back to his director role in February 2021, Autuori was an interim head coach in September 2021, after the departure of António Oliveira. On 24 February 2022, he was presented at Goiás as technical coordinator, but left on 24 March as head coach Bruno Pivetti was sacked.

On 26 March 2022, Autuori returned to Internacional, now as technical coordinator. He left the club on 3 October, after returning to Atlético Nacional as manager.

Autuori resigned from the Verdolagas on 6 July 2023, and returned to Cruzeiro on 4 August, as technical director. On 14 November, he was named head coach of the club until the end of the season, and managed to narrowly avoid relegation before returning to his previous role.

On 28 April 2024, after the sale of Ronaldo's shares of Cruzeiro's SAF, Autuori left the club. On 9 May, he joined Coritiba as technical director.

On 16 April 2025, Autuori returned to Sporting Cristal after nearly 13 years, being named manager of club. Roughly one year later, he left by mutual consent, and returned to Brazil on 24 July 2026, after taking over second division side Fortaleza.

Despite qualifying Fortaleza to the Série B promotion play-offs, Autuori was dismissed by the club on 8 November 2026, after three winless matches.

== Managerial statistics ==
As of 7 November 2026

Team	From	To	Record				
Team	From	To	G	W	D	L	Win %
Nacional	1987	1989	80	39	17	24	48.75
Vitória de Guimarães	1989	23 September 1990	83	35	22	26	42.17
Marítimo	24 September 1990	June 1993	104	42	22	40	40.38
Marítimo	December 1993	June 1995	23	9	9	5	39.13
Botafogo	12 July 1995	26 December 1995	31	16	10	5	51.61
Benfica	11 July 1996	19 January 1997	23	14	4	5	60.87
Cruzeiro	21 February 1997	13 August 1997	37	17	9	11	45.95
Flamengo	14 August 1997	12 March 1998	45	19	14	12	42.22
Internacional	1999	3 August 1999	50	28	12	10	56.00
Santos	23 August 1999	24 November 1999	18	6	5	7	33.33
Cruzeiro	24 November 1999	23 April 2000	29	16	6	7	55.17
Alianza Lima	7 December 2000	1 June 2001	23	14	7	2	60.87
Botafogo	1 June 2001	13 October 2001	27	8	5	14	29.63
Sporting Cristal	14 January 2002	31 December 2002	50	24	12	14	48.00
Peru	6 January 2003	25 April 2005	38	12	11	15	31.58
São Paulo	29 April 2005	29 December 2005	55	26	11	18	47.27
Kashima Antlers	29 December 2005	1 December 2006	34	18	4	12	52.94
Cruzeiro	5 December 2006	29 April 2007	20	11	5	4	55.00
Al-Rayyan	2 May 2007	17 May 2009	67	33	14	20	49.25
Grêmio	13 May 2009	11 November 2009	42	16	13	13	38.10
Al-Rayyan	11 November 2009	26 August 2011	67	36	12	19	53.73
Qatar	19 February 2012	14 January 2013	39	10	16	13	25.64
Vasco da Gama	22 March 2013	9 July 2013	6	2	1	3	33.33
São Paulo	11 July 2013	9 September 2013	14	2	4	8	14.29
Atlético Mineiro	20 December 2013	24 April 2014	8	3	4	1	37.50
Cerezo Osaka	16 December 2014	17 November 2015	41	17	13	11	41.46
Atlético Paranaense	7 March 2016	23 May 2017	92	38	25	29	41.30
Ludogorets Razgrad	6 June 2018	9 October 2018	22	14	4	4	63.64
Atlético Nacional	2 November 2018	24 May 2019	28	9	10	9	32.14
Botafogo	13 February 2020	1 October 2020	23	7	12	4	30.43
Athletico Paranaense	22 October 2020	26 February 2021	26	11	5	10	42.31
Athletico Paranaense (interim)	9 September 2021	1 October 2021	2	0	0	2	0.00
Atlético Nacional	3 October 2022	6 July 2023	38	17	16	5	44.74
Cruzeiro (interim)	14 November 2023	6 December 2023	6	2	4	0	33.33
Sporting Cristal	16 April 2025	25 March 2026	46	21	12	13	45.65
Fortaleza	24 July 2026	8 November 2026	19	7	10	2	36.84
Total			1,329	573	360	396	43.12

== Honours ==
Botafogo

- Campeonato Brasileiro Série A: 1995

Cruzeiro

- Campeonato Mineiro: 1997
- Copa Libertadores: 1997

Alianza Lima

- Primera División Peruana: 2001

Sporting Cristal

- Primera División Peruana: 2002

São Paulo

- Copa Libertadores: 2005
- FIFA Club World Cup: 2005

Al Rayyan

- Emir of Qatar Cup: 2010, 2011

Atlético Paranaense

- Campeonato Paranaense: 2016

Ludogorets Razgrad

- Bulgarian Supercup: 2018

Atlético Nacional

- Superliga Colombiana: 2023

== See also ==
- List of football managers with the most matches
