= Juan Felipe Aguirre =

Colombian footballer (born 1996)

Personal information
- Full name: Juan Felipe Aguirre Tabares
- Date of birth: 29 August 1996 (age 30)
- Place of birth: Medellín, Antioquia, Colombia
- Height: 1.86 m (6 ft 1 in)
- Position: Centre-back

Team information
- Current team: Athletico Paranaense
- Number: 33

Youth career
- 2001–2006: Escuela de la Universidad
- 2006: Sueños del Fútbol
- 2007: Envigado
- 2008–2016: Atlético Nacional

Senior career*
Years	Team	Apps	(Gls)
2016	Atlético Nacional	0	(0)
2016	→ Leones (loan)	13	(1)
2017–2019	Leones	63	(2)
2019–2021	Celaya	44	(2)
2021–2022	Montevideo Wanderers	56	(2)
2023–2025	Atlético Nacional	82	(6)
2025–	Athletico Paranaense	49	(1)
- * Club domestic league appearances and goals as of 18:48, 10 November 2026 (UTC)

Juan Felipe Aguirre Tabares (born 29 August 1996) is a Colombian footballer who currently plays as a centre-back for Athletico Paranaense.

== Club career ==
Born in Medellín, Aguirre began his career with the Escuela de la Universidad de Antioquia, where he spent five years before joining Sueños del Fútbol. Having featured for Sueños del Fútbol at the age of nine in the Torneo de Pony Fútbol, he went on to join Envigado, spending one season at the age of ten. At the age of eleven, he trialled with Atlético Nacional, and joined the club shortly after.

Having grown too old to represent the club at youth level, Atlético Nacional loaned him to Categoría Primera B side Leones. Having made his professional debut in the Categoría Primera B in 2016, he helped the side to promotion in the 2017 season, before featuring for the side in the 2018 Categoría Primera A.

In January 2019, Aguirre moved to Mexico to sign for Ascenso MX side Celaya. The following season, he established himself in the team, before continuing with the club for the beginning of the 2020–21 season, in which the league was renamed the Liga de Expansión MX.

After two seasons with Uruguayan side Wanderers, Aguirre returned to Colombia, signing with former club Atlético Nacional ahead of the 2023 season. He scored his first goal for the club in a 1–1 draw with Deportivo Pasto on 21 May 2023.

== Career statistics ==
As of 10 November 2026.

Appearances and goals by club, season and competition
Club	Season	League			Cup (Note: Includes Copa Colombia, Copa MX, Copa Uruguay, Copa do Brasil)		Continental		State league		Other		Total	
Club	Season	Division	Apps	Goals	Apps	Goals	Apps	Goals	Apps	Goals	Apps	Goals	Apps	Goals
Leones	2016	Categoría Primera B	13	1	4	1	—		—		—		17	2
Leones	2017	Categoría Primera B	33	1	0	0	—		—		—		33	1
Leones	2018	Categoría Primera A	30	1	3	1	—		—		—		33	2
Leones	Total		76	3	7	2	—		—		—		83	5
Celaya	2018–19	Ascenso MX	13	1	0	0	—		—		—		13	1
Celaya	2019–20	Ascenso MX	22	1	3	0	—		—		—		25	1
Celaya	2020–21	Liga de Expansión MX	9	0	0	0	—		—		—		9	0
Celaya	Total		44	2	3	0	—		—		—		47	2
Montevideo Wanderers	2021	Uruguayan Primera División	25	2	0	0	—		—		1 (Note: Appearances in Supercopa Uruguaya)	0	26	2
Montevideo Wanderers	2022	Uruguayan Primera División	31	0	2	0	6 (Note: Appearances in Copa Sudamericana)	0	—		—		39	0
Montevideo Wanderers	Total		56	2	2	0	6	0	—		1	0	65	2
Atlético Nacional	2023	Categoría Primera A	39	3	7	2	4 (Note: Appearances in Copa Libertadores)	0	—		1 (Note: Appearances in Superliga Colombiana)	0	51	5
Atlético Nacional	2024	Categoría Primera A	35	3	7	0	—		—		—		42	3
Atlético Nacional	2025	Categoría Primera A	8	0	0	0	1	0	—		2	0	11	0
Atlético Nacional	Total		82	6	14	2	5	0	—		3	0	104	8
Athletico Paranaense	2025	Série B	16	0	2	0	—		—		—		18	0
Athletico Paranaense	2026	Série A	29	1	3	0	—		4 (Note: Appearances in Campeonato Paranaense)	0	—		36	1
Athletico Paranaense	Total		45	1	5	0	—		4	0	—		54	1
Career total			303	14	31	4	11	0	4	0	4	0	353	18
