= Yesus Cabrera =

Colombian footballer (born 1990)

Personal information
- Full name: Yesus Segundo Cabrera Ramírez
- Date of birth: 15 September 1990 (age 36)
- Place of birth: Cartagena, Colombia
- Height: 1.68 m (5 ft 6 in)
- Position: Midfielder

Team information
- Current team: Deportivo Pereira
- Number: 10

Senior career*
Years	Team	Apps	(Gls)
2009–2012	La Equidad	1	(0)
2012–2015	Real Cartagena	70	(18)
2014	→ Deportes Tolima (loan)	13	(0)
2015–2021	América de Cali	122	(19)
2016–2017	→ Deportivo Pasto (loan)	55	(9)
2018	→ Once Caldas (loan)	21	(4)
2021–2022	Cuiabá	7	(0)
2022	Atlético Junior	10	(1)
2023–	Deportivo Pereira	71	(8)
- * Club domestic league appearances and goals as of 12 December 2025

Yesus Segundo Cabrera Ramírez (born 15 September 1990) is a Colombian footballer who plays as a midfielder for Colombian club Deportivo Pereira.

== Career ==
=== Cuiabá ===
On 22 July 2021 Cabrera signed with Cuiabá, his first opportunity to play abroad. He debuted on 18 August 2021 against Grêmio in a 1–0 Campeonato Brasileiro Série A loss.

== Honours ==
América de Cali

- Categoría Primera A (2): 2019-II, 2020
