= 2018 Superliga Colombiana =

Millonarios	Atlético Nacional
2	1

First leg
Millonarios	Atlético Nacional
0	0
- Date: 31 January 2018
- Venue: Estadio El Campín, Bogotá
- Referee: John Hinestroza

Second leg
Atlético Nacional	Millonarios
1	2
- Date: 7 February 2018
- Venue: Estadio Atanasio Girardot, Medellín
- Referee: Gustavo Murillo

The 2018 Superliga Colombiana (known as the 2018 Superliga Águila for sponsorship purposes) was the seventh edition of the Superliga Colombiana. It was contested by the champions of the 2017 Categoría Primera A season from 31 January to 7 February 2018. Millonarios defeated Atlético Nacional 2–1 on aggregate to win their first Superliga title.

== Teams ==
Team	Qualification	Previous appearances (bold indicates winners)
Atlético Nacional	2017 Apertura champions	4 (**2012**, 2014, 2015, **2016**)
Millonarios	2017 Finalización champions	1 (2013)

== Matches ==
=== First leg ===
31 January 2018
19:05 UTC−5

Millonarios	0–0	Atlético Nacional
	Report

Estadio El Campín, Bogotá
Attendance: 14,898
Referee: John Hinestroza

=== Second leg ===
7 February 2018
19:25 UTC−5 (Note: The kickoff for the second leg was initially scheduled at 19:05, but was delayed by 20 minutes since Millonarios's arrival to the stadium was delayed.)

Atlético Nacional	1–2	Millonarios
Rentería 21'	Report	Ovelar 34', 54'

Estadio Atanasio Girardot, Medellín
Attendance: 42,000
Referee: Gustavo Murillo
