= Colombia national football team records and statistics =

The following is a list of the Colombia national football team's competitive records and statistics.

== Individual records ==
=== Player records ===
As of 17 November 2026
Players in bold are still active with Colombia.

==== Most capped players ====
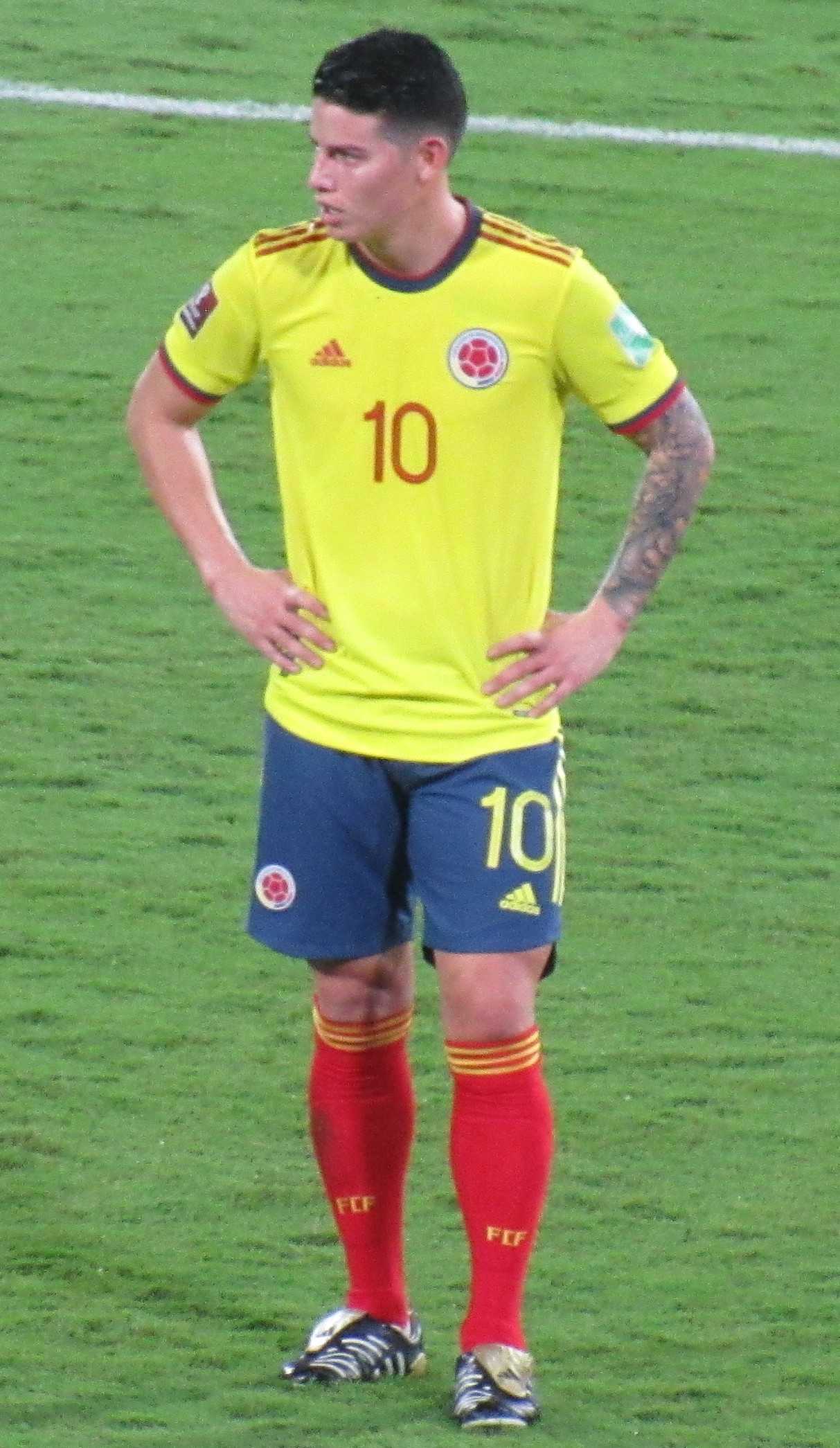
James Rodríguez is Colombia's most-capped player with 131 international appearances.

Rank	Player	Caps	Goals	Career
1	James Rodríguez	131	31	2011–2026
2	David Ospina	130	0	2007–2026
3	Juan Cuadrado	116	11	2010–2023
4	Carlos Valderrama	111	11	1985–1998
5	Radamel Falcao	104	36	2007–2023
6	Mario Yepes	102	6	1999–2014
7	Leonel Álvarez	101	1	1985–1997
8	**Davinson Sánchez**	89	4	2016–
9	Carlos Sánchez	88	0	2007–2018
10	Freddy Rincón	84	17	1990–2001
11	**Luis Díaz**	79	23	2018–
12	Luis Carlos Perea	78	2	1987–1994
13	Óscar Córdoba	73	0	1993–2006
13	Iván Córdoba	73	5	1997–2011
15	Luis Amaranto Perea	72	0	2002–2014
15	**Jefferson Lerma**	72	5	2017–
17	Abel Aguilar	71	7	2004–2018
18	**Santiago Arias**	69	0	2013–
19	René Higuita	68	0	1987–1999
19	Arnoldo Iguarán	68	25	1979–1993
19	Pablo Armero	68	2	2008–2017
22	Alexis Mendoza	67	2	1987–1997
23	Víctor Aristizábal	66	15	1993–2003
24	Luis Herrera	61	1	1987–1996
24	Juan Camilo Zúñiga	61	1	2005–2015

==== Most capped goalkeepers ====
Rank	Player	Caps	Goals	Career
1	David Ospina	130	0	2007–2026
2	Óscar Córdoba	73	0	1993–2006
3	René Higuita	68	3	1987–1999
4	Miguel Calero	51	0	1995–2009
4	Faryd Mondragón	51	0	1993–2014
6	**Camilo Vargas**	48	0	2014–
7	Pedro Zape	47	0	1972–1985
8	Efraín Sánchez	30	0	1947–1962
9	**Álvaro Montero**	12	0	2019–
10	Juan Carlos Henao	12	0	2000–2005

==== Top goalscorers ====
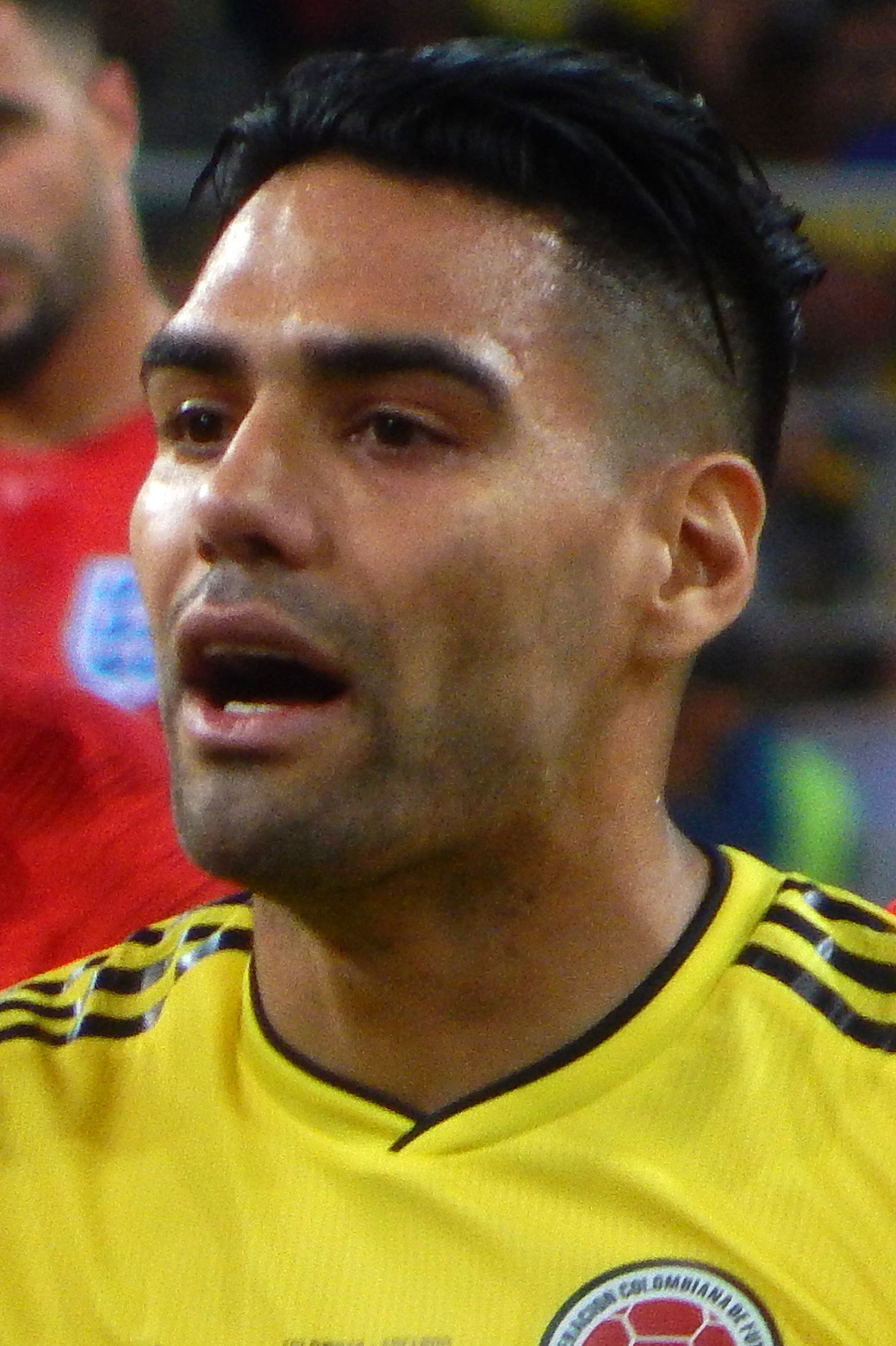
Radamel Falcao is Colombia's all-time top scorer with 36 goals.

Rank	Player	Goals	Caps	Average	Career
1	Radamel Falcao (list)	36	104	0.35	2007–2023
2	James Rodríguez	31	131	0.24	2011–2026
3	Arnoldo Iguarán	25	68	0.37	1979–1993
4	**Luis Díaz**	23	79	0.29	2018–
5	Faustino Asprilla	20	57	0.35	1993–2001
6	Freddy Rincón	17	84	0.2	1990–2001
7	Carlos Bacca	16	52	0.31	2010–2018
8	Teófilo Gutiérrez	15	51	0.29	2009–2017
8	Víctor Aristizábal	15	66	0.23	1993–2003
10	Adolfo Valencia	14	37	0.38	1992–1998

== Competition records ==
=== FIFA World Cup ===
FIFA World Cup record										Qualification record						
Year	Round	Position	Pld	W	D	L	GF	GA	Squad	Pos	Pld	W	D	L	GF	GA
(Uruguay) 1930	Not a FIFA member									Not a FIFA member						
(Italy) 1934	Not a FIFA member									Not a FIFA member						
(France) 1938	Withdrew									Withdrew						
(Brazil) 1950	Did not enter									Did not enter						
(Switzerland) 1954	Banned									Did not participate						
(Sweden) 1958	Did not qualify									3rd	4	0	1	3	3	8
(Chile) 1962	Group stage	14th	3	0	1	2	5	11	Squad	1st	2	1	1	0	2	1
(England) 1966	Did not qualify									3rd	4	1	0	3	4	10
(Mexico) 1970	Did not qualify									3rd	6	1	1	4	7	12
(West Germany) 1974	Did not qualify									2nd	4	1	3	0	3	2
(Argentina) 1978	Did not qualify									3rd	4	0	2	2	1	8
(Spain) 1982	Did not qualify									3rd	4	0	2	2	4	7
(Mexico) 1986	Did not qualify									3rd	8	3	2	3	8	10
(Italy) 1990	Round of 16	14th	4	1	1	2	4	4	Squad	1st^{1}	6	3	2	1	6	3
(United States) 1994	Group stage	19th	3	1	0	2	4	5	Squad	1st	6	4	2	0	13	2
(France) 1998	Group stage	21st	3	1	0	2	1	3	Squad	3rd	16	8	4	4	23	15
(South Korea) (Japan) 2002	Did not qualify									6th	18	7	6	5	20	15
(Germany) 2006	Did not qualify									6th	18	6	6	6	24	16
(South Africa) 2010	Did not qualify									7th	18	6	5	7	14	18
(Brazil) 2014	Quarter-finals	5th	5	4	0	1	12	4	Squad	2nd	16	9	3	4	27	13
(Russia) 2018	Round of 16	9th	4	2	1	1	6	3	Squad	4th	18	7	6	5	21	19
(Qatar) 2022	Did not qualify									6th	18	5	8	5	20	19
(Canada) (Mexico) (United States) 2026	Round of 16	10th	5	3	2	0	5	1	Squad	3rd	18	7	7	4	28	18
Total	Quarter-finals	7/23	27	12	5	10	37	31	—	5th	188	69	61	58	228	196

1.Played intercontinental play-offs.

=== Copa América ===
Champions Runners-up Third place Fourth place

South American Championship / Copa América record
Year	Round	Position	Pld	W	D	L	GF	GA	Squad
(Argentina) 1916	Did not participate								
(Uruguay) 1917	Did not participate								
(Brazil) 1919	Did not participate								
(Chile) 1920	Did not participate								
(Argentina) 1921	Did not participate								
(Brazil) 1922	Did not participate								
(Uruguay) 1923	Did not participate								
(Uruguay) 1924	Did not participate								
(Argentina) 1925	Did not participate								
(Chile) 1926	Did not participate								
(Peru) 1927	Did not participate								
(Argentina) 1929	Did not participate								
(Peru) 1935	Did not participate								
(Argentina) 1937	Did not participate								
(Peru) 1939	Withdrew								
(Chile) 1941	Withdrew								
(Uruguay) 1942	Withdrew								
(Chile) 1945	Fifth place	5th	6	1	1	4	7	25	Squad
(Argentina) 1946	Withdrew								
(Ecuador) 1947	Eighth place	8th	7	0	2	5	2	19	Squad
(Brazil) 1949	Eighth place	8th	7	0	2	5	4	23	Squad
(Peru) 1953	Withdrew								
(Chile) 1955	Withdrew								
(Uruguay) 1956	Withdrew								
(Peru) 1957	Fifth place	5th	6	2	0	4	10	25	Squad
(Argentina) 1959	Withdrew								
(Ecuador) 1959	Withdrew								
(Bolivia) 1963	Seventh place	7th	6	0	1	5	10	19	Squad
(Uruguay) 1967	Did not qualify								
1975	Runners-up	2nd	9	6	0	3	11	5	Squad
1979	Group stage	5th	4	2	1	1	5	2	Squad
1983	Group stage	7th	4	1	2	1	5	5	Squad
(Argentina) 1987	Third place	3rd	4	3	0	1	8	3	Squad
(Brazil) 1989	Group stage	6th	4	1	2	1	5	4	Squad
(Chile) 1991	Fourth place	4th	7	2	2	3	5	6	Squad
(Ecuador) 1993	Third place	3rd	6	3	2	1	6	4	Squad
(Uruguay) 1995	Third place	3rd	6	3	1	2	7	8	Squad
(Bolivia) 1997	Quarter-finals	8th	4	1	0	3	6	7	Squad
(Paraguay) 1999	Quarter-finals	5th	4	3	0	1	8	4	Squad
(Colombia) 2001	Champions	1st	6	6	0	0	11	0	Squad
(Peru) 2004	Fourth place	4th	6	3	1	2	7	7	Squad
(Venezuela) 2007	Group stage	9th	3	1	0	2	3	9	Squad
(Argentina) 2011	Quarter-finals	6th	4	2	1	1	3	2	Squad
(Chile) 2015	Quarter-finals	6th	4	1	2	1	1	1	Squad
(United States) 2016	Third place	3rd	6	3	1	2	7	6	Squad
(Brazil) 2019	Quarter-finals	5th	4	3	1	0	4	0	Squad
(Brazil) 2021	Third place	3rd	7	2	3	2	7	7	Squad
(United States) 2024	Runners-up	2nd	6	4	1	1	12	3	Squad
Total	1 Title	24/48	130	53	26	51	154	194	—

=== CONCACAF Gold Cup ===
CONCACAF Gold Cup record
Year	Round	Position	Pld	W	D	L	GF	GA	Squad
(United States) 2000	Runners-up	2nd	5	2	1	2	5	7	Squad
(Mexico) (United States) 2003	Quarter-finals	5th	3	1	1	1	2	3	Squad
(United States) 2005	Semi-finals	4th	5	2	0	3	7	7	Squad
Total	Runners-up	3/3	13	5	2	6	14	17	—

=== FIFA Confederations Cup ===
FIFA Confederations Cup record
Year	Round	Position	Pld	W	D	L	GF	GA	Squad
(Saudi Arabia) 1992	Did not qualify								
(Saudi Arabia) 1995	Did not qualify								
(Saudi Arabia) 1997	Did not qualify								
(Mexico) 1999	Did not qualify								
(South Korea) (Japan) 2001	Did not qualify								
(France) 2003	Fourth place	4th	5	2	0	3	5	5	Squad
(Germany) 2005	Did not qualify								
(South Africa) 2009	Did not qualify								
(Brazil) 2013	Did not qualify								
(Russia) 2017	Did not qualify								
Total	Fourth place	1/10	5	2	0	3	5	5	—

== Head-to-head record ==
This is a list of the official games played by Colombia national football team up to and including the match against Chile on 17 November 2026.

=== AFC ===
Team	Pld	W	D	L	GF	GA	GD	WPCT
Australia (Note: Football Federation Australia were founder members of the Oceania Football Confederation (OFC) before joining the Asian Football Confederation in 2006. Matches against Australia prior to 2006 are included in the OFC section.)	2	1	1	0	3	0	+3	50.00
Bahrain	1	1	0	0	6	0	+6	100.00
China	2	1	0	1	5	2	+3	50.00
Iraq	1	1	0	0	1	0	+1	100.00
Japan	6	4	1	1	9	4	+5	66.67
Jordan	2	2	0	0	5	0	+5	100.00
Kuwait	1	1	0	0	3	1	+2	100.00
Qatar	1	1	0	0	1	0	+1	100.00
Saudi Arabia	3	2	1	0	3	1	+2	66.67
South Korea	8	1	3	4	9	14	−5	12.50
United Arab Emirates	1	1	0	0	2	0	+2	100.00
Uzbekistan	1	1	0	0	3	1	+2	100.00
Total	29	17	6	6	50	23	+27	58.62

Source: Results 1938–79, 1980–99, 2000–19 and 2020–present

=== CAF ===
Team	Pld	W	D	L	GF	GA	GD	WPCT
Algeria	1	0	0	1	0	3	−3	0.00
Cameroon	4	2	0	2	8	3	+5	50.00
Egypt	2	0	2	0	1	1	0	0.00
Ivory Coast	1	1	0	0	2	1	+1	100.00
Ghana	1	1	0	0	1	0	+1	100.00
DR Congo	1	1	0	0	1	0	+1	100.00
Liberia	1	1	0	0	2	1	+1	100.00
Morocco	1	1	0	0	2	0	+2	100.00
Nigeria	4	3	1	0	4	1	+3	75.00
Senegal	2	1	1	0	3	2	+1	50.00
South Africa	1	0	0	1	1	2	−1	0.00
Tunisia	2	1	1	0	2	1	+1	50.00
Total	21	12	5	4	27	15	+12	57.14

Source: Results 1938–79, 1980–99, 2000–19 and 2020–present

=== CONCACAF ===
Team	Pld	W	D	L	GF	GA	GD	WPCT
Canada	4	2	1	1	4	2	+2	50.00
Costa Rica	16	13	0	3	40	17	+23	81.25
Curaçao	1	1	0	0	4	2	+2	100.00
El Salvador	7	5	1	1	16	7	+9	71.43
Guatemala	5	3	2	0	14	6	+8	60.00
Haiti	5	4	0	1	12	4	+8	80.00
Honduras	12	5	2	5	13	12	+1	41.67
Jamaica	5	4	0	1	7	1	+6	80.00
Mexico	30	10	10	10	32	30	+2	33.33
Panama	7	5	0	2	20	7	+13	71.43
Puerto Rico	1	1	0	0	4	1	+3	100.00
Trinidad and Tobago	3	2	0	1	8	4	+4	66.67
United States	22	14	5	3	33	15	+18	63.64
Total	118	69	21	28	207	108	+99	58.47

Source: Results 1938–79, 1980–99, 2000–19 and 2020–present

=== CONMEBOL ===
Team	Pld	W	D	L	GF	GA	GD	WPCT
Argentina	43	10	12	21	42	74	−32	23.26
Bolivia	34	17	10	7	54	31	+23	50.00
Brazil	38	4	12	22	22	71	−49	10.53
Chile	46	13	18	15	60	70	−10	28.26
Ecuador	50	23	13	14	54	45	+9	46.00
Paraguay	52	23	10	19	61	56	+5	44.23
Peru	63	22	24	17	74	66	+8	34.92
Uruguay	47	13	13	21	52	67	−15	27.66
Venezuela	44	22	15	7	64	29	+35	50.00
Total	417	147	127	143	483	509	−26	35.25

Source: Results 1938–79, 1980–99, 2000–19 and 2020–present

=== OFC ===
Team	Pld	W	D	L	GF	GA	GD	WPCT
Australia (Note: Football Federation Australia were founder members of the Oceania Football Confederation (OFC) before joining the Asian Football Confederation in 2006. Matches against Australia after 2006 are included in the AFC section.)	3	2	1	0	4	2	+2	66.67
New Zealand	2	2	0	0	5	2	+3	100.00
Total	5	4	1	0	9	4	+5	80.00

Source: Results 1938–79, 1980–99, 2000–19 and 2020–present

=== UEFA ===
Team	Pld	W	D	L	GF	GA	GD	WPCT
Belgium	2	1	0	1	2	2	0	50.00
Croatia	1	0	0	1	1	2	−1	0.00
East Germany	1	0	0	1	0	2	−2	0.00
England	6	0	3	3	4	11	−7	0.00
Finland	1	1	0	0	3	1	+2	100.00
France	5	1	0	4	6	10	−4	20.00
Germany	4	1	1	2	6	9	−3	25.00
Greece	2	2	0	0	5	0	+5	100.00
Hungary	1	0	0	1	1	3	−2	0.00
Israel	2	1	1	0	1	0	+1	50.00
Montenegro	1	1	0	0	1	0	+1	100.00
Netherlands	1	0	1	0	0	0	0	0.00
Northern Ireland	1	1	0	0	2	0	+2	100.00
Norway	1	0	1	0	0	0	0	0.00
Poland	8	5	1	2	12	9	+3	62.50
Portugal	1	0	1	0	0	0	0	0.00
Republic of Ireland	1	0	0	1	0	1	−1	0.00
Romania	4	1	1	2	4	6	−2	25.00
Serbia	1	1	0	0	1	0	+1	100.00
Scotland	3	1	2	0	3	2	+1	33.33
Slovakia	3	2	1	0	2	0	+2	66.67
Slovenia	1	1	0	0	1	0	+1	100.00
Soviet Union	3	0	2	1	5	7	−2	0.00
Spain	4	1	2	1	4	4	0	25.00
Sweden	2	0	2	0	2	2	0	0.00
Switzerland	5	2	2	1	9	6	+3	40.00
Turkey	1	0	0	1	1	2	−1	0.00
West Germany	1	0	1	0	1	1	0	0.00
Yugoslavia	4	0	1	3	0	7	−7	0.00
Total	71	23	23	25	77	87	−10	32.39

Source: Results 1938–79, 1980–99, 2000–19 and 2020–present

=== Full Confederation record ===
Team	Pld	W	D	L	GF	GA	GD	WPCT
AFC	29	17	6	6	50	23	+27	58.62
CAF	21	12	5	4	27	15	+12	57.14
CONCACAF	118	69	21	28	207	108	+99	58.47
CONMEBOL	417	147	127	143	483	509	−26	35.25
OFC	5	4	1	0	9	4	+5	80.00
UEFA	71	23	23	25	77	87	−10	32.39
Total	661	272	183	206	853	746	+107	41.15

Source: Results 1938–79, 1980–99, 2000–19 and 2020–present
