= 2024 Copa América final halftime show =

2024 Copa América halftime show by Shakira

- Date: 14 July 2024
- Location: Miami Gardens, Florida, U.S.
- Venue: Hard Rock Stadium
- Headliner: Shakira
- Sponsor: Verizon

Live video
- 2024 Copa América final halftime show on YouTube

The 2024 Copa América final halftime show, headlined by Colombian singer-songwriter Shakira, occurred during the halftime show of the 2024 Copa América final match between Argentina and Colombia on July 14, 2024, at Hard Rock Stadium in Miami Gardens, Florida. The event marked the first-ever halftime show in Copa América history, with Shakira delivering a performance that blended her classic hits with newer tracks. The performance was widely covered by international media and drew a wide variety reactions due to its production and logistical impact on the match.

== Background ==
Shakira, who had previously performed at major sporting events like the Super Bowl and FIFA World Cup, was announced as the headline act for the 2024 Copa América final on July 8, 2024, by CONMEBOL. CONMEBOL aimed to elevate the tournament’s global appeal by introducing a Super Bowl-style halftime show, extending the traditional halftime break to accommodate the performance. CONMEBOL president Alejandro Domínguez described Shakira as "an extraordinary South American star," emphasizing her ability to promote unity and passion through sport. The final featured Argentina, led by Lionel Messi, against Colombia, Shakira’s home country, adding a personal dimension to her participation. The match was part of the 2024 Copa América tournament hosted across the United States, culminating in Miami.

== Performance ==
Shakira's performance commenced around 8:50 PM local time, extending the halftime from 15 to 25 minutes, a decision that stirred debate over player fatigue. Lasting approximately 7 minutes, her set included 4 songs. Opening with a digital augmented-reality she wolf howling, Shakira took the stage with her 2006 hit "Hips Don’t Lie", accompanied by pyrotechnics and dancers, she wearing a metallic silver outfit 2024 Copa America Final. She then performed "Te Felicito", from her 2022 album Las Mujeres Ya No Lloran. The third song she performed was "TQG", a reguetón song. She closed her performance with "Puntería", the official song for TelevisaUnivision’s broadcast of the tournament. Shakira was accompanied by female and robot dancers, while the staging of the performance also featured helicopters and digital visuals complementing each song.

== Reception ==
The performance garnered extensive coverage across media. Billboard and Rolling Stone praised the visual spectacle and Shakira’s energy, noting her ability to captivate over 54,000 attendees 2024 Copa America Final: El Confidencial praised the performance, describing that Shakira "not only lifted the spirits of fans, but also demonstrated once again why she is considered one of the most influential and beloved artists worldwide. With her talent and charisma, Shakira has transcended borders and united millions of people through music and sports."

However, controversy arose over alleged playback on parts of some songs, with fans on social media and some Spanish reports criticizing it as reminiscent of her 2020 Super Bowl performance at the same stadium. Colombia's head coach Néstor Lorenzo criticized the extended length of the halftime, as it can affect players' performance.

== Setlist ==
"Hips Don't Lie"
"Te Felicito"
"TQG"
"Puntería"
