= Francisco Nájera =

Colombian footballer (born 1983)

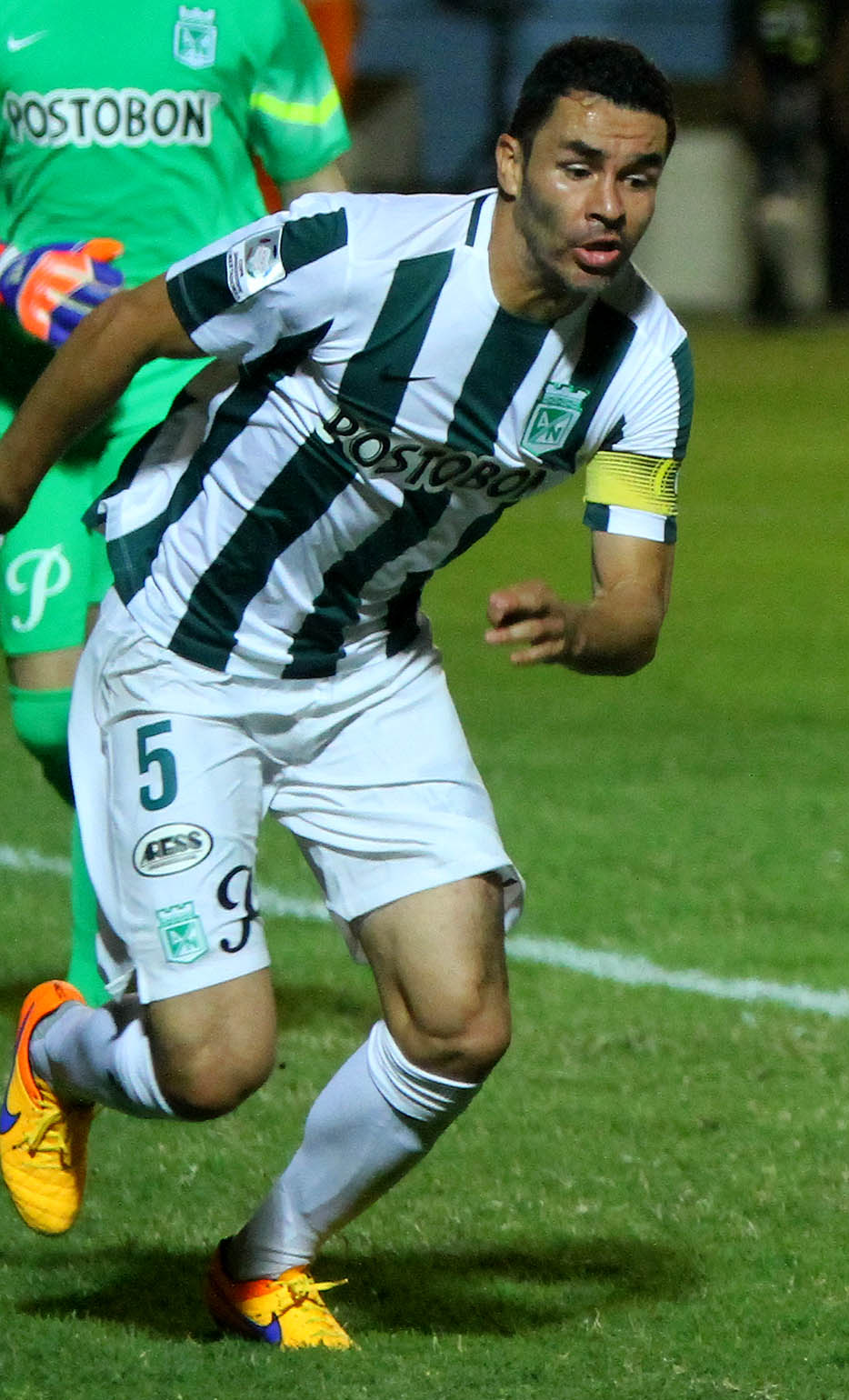
- Nájera with Atlético Nacional in 2015

Personal information
- Full name: Álvaro Francisco Nájera Gil
- Date of birth: July 25, 1983 (age 43)
- Place of birth: Bogotá, Colombia
- Height: 1.85 m (6 ft 1 in)
- Position: Centre back

Team information
- Current team: La Equidad

Youth career
- 1995–2001: Santa Fe

Senior career*
Years	Team	Apps	(Gls)
2001–2006	Santa Fe	90	(2)
2006–2007	Querétaro	23	(0)
2007–2009	Santa Fe	64	(3)
2009–2011	Unión Española	41	(2)
2011–2012	Olimpia	52	(4)
2012–2017	Atlético Nacional	137	(10)
2017–2018	La Equidad	20	(2)

International career
2006	Colombia	1	(0)
- * Club domestic league appearances and goals as of 13:27, 31 January 2018 (UTC)

Álvaro Francisco Nájera Gil (born 25 July 1983) is a retired Colombian footballer who played for last time in La Equidad of Colombian First Division.

He played the 2006/2007 season in Mexico for Querétaro; the team failed to stay in México Primera División football, after which he returned to Colombia.

== Career statistics ==
As of 31 January 2018

Appearances and goals by club, season and competition
Club	Season	League			Cup		Other		Total	
Club	Season	Division	Apps	Goals	Apps	Goals	Apps	Goals	Apps	Goals
Santa Fe	2009	Categoría Primera A	15	0	0	0	0	0	15	0
Unión Española	2009	Primera División of Chile	10	1	0	0	2 (Note: Appearances in Copa Sudamericana)	0	12	1
Unión Española	2010	Primera Division of Chile	31	1	2	0	0	0	33	1
Unión Española	Total		41	2	2	0	2	0	45	2
Olimpia	2011	Paraguayan Primera División	33	3	0	0	5	0	38	3
Olimpia	2012	Paraguayan Primera División	19	1	0	0	5 (Note: Appearances in Copa Libertadores)	0	24	1
Olimpia	Total		52	4	0	0	10	0	62	4
Atlético Nacional	2012	Categoría Primera A	13	0	6	0	0	0	19	0
Atlético Nacional	2013	Categoría Primera A	32	6	11	1	6	0	49	7
Atlético Nacional	2014	Categoría Primera A	28	2	10	0	16 (Note: One Appearance in Superliga Colombiana, Four Appearances in Copa Libertadores, Eleven Appearances in Copa Sudamericana)	0	54	2
Atlético Nacional	2015	Categoría Primera A	28	2	2	0	8 (Note: One Appearance in Superliga Colombiana, Seven Appearances in Copa Libertadores)	0	38	2
Atlético Nacional	2016	Categoría Primera A	26	0	6	0	9 (Note: Two Appearances in Superliga Colombiana, Seven Appearances in Copa Sudamericana)	0	41	0
Atlético Nacional	2017	Categoría Primera A	10	0	0	0	5 (Note: Four Appearances in Copa Libertadores, One Appearance in Recopa Sudamericana)	0	15	0
Atlético Nacional	Total		137	10	35	1	44	0	216	11
La Equidad	2017	Categoría Primera A	20	2	1	0	0	0	21	2
Career totals			265	18	38	1	56	0	359	19

== Honours ==
=== Club ===
Club Olimpia

- Paraguayan Primera División (1): 2011 Clausura

Atlético Nacional

- Categoría Primera A (3): 2013-I, 2013-II, 2014-I
- Copa Colombia (2): 2012, 2013
- Superliga Colombiana (1): 2012
