= 2024 Copa América final =

International association football (soccer) match

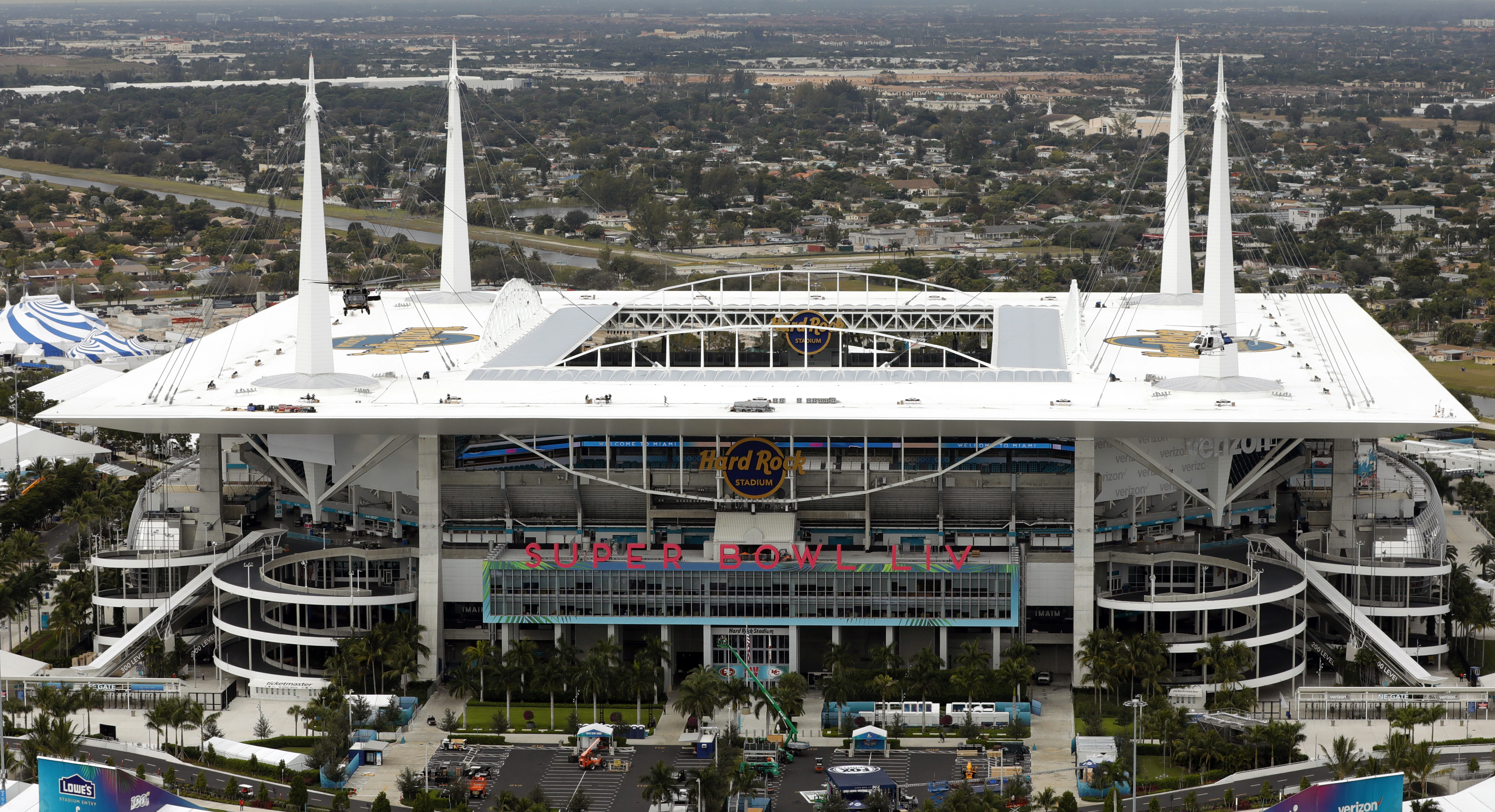
- Hard Rock Stadium, host venue of the final
- Event: 2024 Copa América
Argentina	Colombia
(Argentina)	(Colombia)
1	0
- After extra time
- Date: July 14, 2024
- Venue: Hard Rock Stadium, Miami Gardens, Florida
- Man of the Match: Ángel Di María (Argentina)
- Referee: Raphael Claus (Brazil)
- Attendance: 65,300
- Weather: Partly cloudy night 84 °F (29 °C); 72% humidity

The 2024 Copa América final was an international soccer match to determine the winners of the CONMEBOL 2024 Copa América. The match was played at Hard Rock Stadium in Miami Gardens, Florida, on July 14, 2024. Kickoff was delayed by over an hour and twenty minutes due to overcrowding and other incidents which occurred near the stadium.

The match was Argentina's eighth final, further extending its record, and was Colombia's third Copa América final. Before the match, Argentina had won a joint-record 15 titles; 12 won with a round-robin format and three by winning finals, and Colombia's most recent final win was in 2001.

Defending champions Argentina defeated Colombia 1–0 after extra time to claim a record-breaking 16th Copa América title. It was also Argentina's third consecutive major tournament triumph, following successes at the 2021 Copa América in Brazil and the 2022 FIFA World Cup in Qatar, a streak previously only achieved by Spain (2008, 2010, and 2012) and themselves (1945, 1946, and 1947).

== Venue ==
Hard Rock Stadium in Miami Gardens, Florida, near the city of Miami, hosted the final. It was confirmed as the host on November 20, 2023. The United States had been announced as host in January 2023; the country had previously hosted the Copa América Centenario in 2016 with the final played at MetLife Stadium in East Rutherford, New Jersey, near New York City, which would also host the 2025 FIFA Club World Cup final and the 2026 FIFA World Cup final.

Hard Rock Stadium is primarily the home of the Miami Dolphins of the National Football League and has a grass surface and 65,000 seats. It opened in 1987 and underwent major renovations from 2015 to 2017 that added a roof and other features. The stadium is also a 2026 FIFA World Cup host venue.

== Entertainment ==
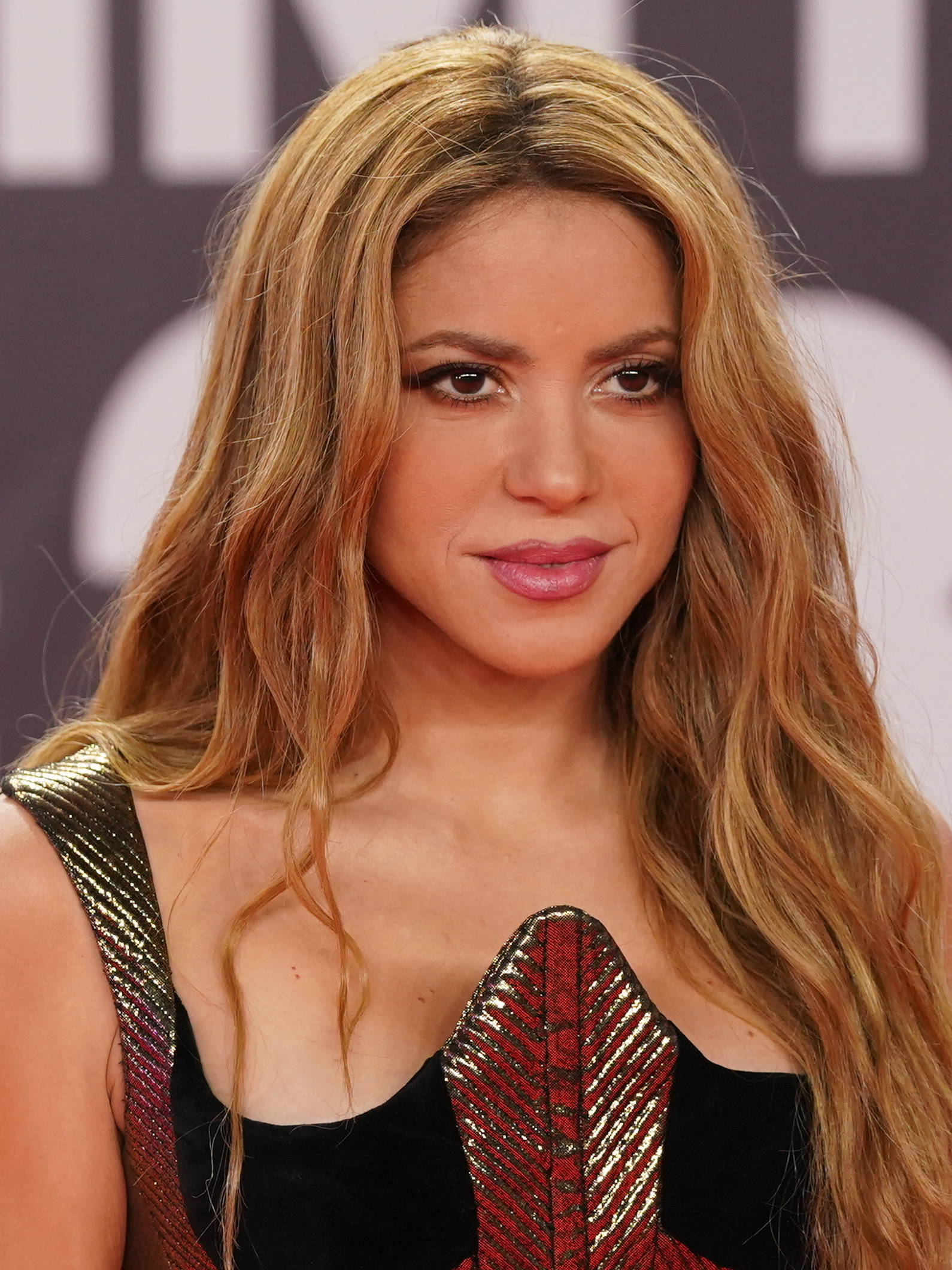
Shakira performed in the halftime show.

=== National anthems ===
Before the final, Colombian singer Karol G and Argentine singer Abel Pintos sang the national anthems of their respective countries.

=== Half-time show ===
Shakira was announced to perform at the halftime show of the final on July 8, 2024. She performed four songs with backup dancers and robots. The extension of halftime from the traditional 15 minutes to 26 minutes was criticized by Colombia coach Néstor Lorenzo prior to the match.

== Route to the final ==
Argentina
Round
Colombia
Opponent
Result
Group stage
Opponent
Result
Canada
2–0
Matchday 1
Paraguay
2–1
Chile
1–0
Matchday 2
Costa Rica
3–0
Peru
2–0
Matchday 3
Brazil
1–1
Group A winners

Pos	Team	Pld	Pts
1	Argentina	3	9
2	Canada	3	4
3	Chile	3	2
4	Peru	3	1

Source: CONMEBOL
Final standings
Group D winners

Pos	Team	Pld	Pts
1	Colombia	3	7
2	Brazil	3	5
3	Costa Rica	3	4
4	Paraguay	3	0

Source: CONMEBOL
Opponent
Result
Knockout stage
Opponent
Result
Ecuador
1–1 (4–2 p)
Quarter-finals
Panama
5–0
Canada
2–0
Semi-finals
Uruguay
1–0

=== Argentina ===
Argentina was the most successful nation in the tournament alongside Uruguay, with both countries winning it 15 times each. Argentina were seeking to defend their Copa América title from their 2021 conquest. As a defending champion, they were also seeking to retain the title for the first time since its 1993 Copa América triumph. The team was drawn in the group A alongside Canada, Chile and Peru. The team that Lionel Scaloni called to the tournament was mostly formed by the 2022 World Cup winners, with only Papu Gómez, Juan Foyth, Paulo Dybala, Thiago Almada and Ángel Correa being absent in relation to the world cup squad.

Argentina opened the group with a 2–0 win against Canada with goals from Julián Álvarez and Lautaro Martínez in the 49th and 88th minute respectively. The second game of the group was a 1–0 win against Chile, in a match which was mostly protagonized by the constant fouling from both sides. The only goal of the match was scored by Lautaro Martínez in the 88th minute after a rebound on Chile's box in a corner kick. With Argentina already qualified to the quarter-finals, Scaloni rotated the team to face Peru in the last match of the group stage. The match ended in a 2–0 win with a brace from Lautaro Martínez in the 47th and 86th minute, who chipped Pedro Gallese in both occasions. With this result, Argentina advanced as the leader of the group.

La Albiceleste faced Ecuador in the quarter-finals, as they were the runners-up of group B. Argentina started winning the match with a header goal from Lisandro Martinez in the 35th minute. In the second half Ecuador was awarded a penalty kick after a handball from Rodrigo De Paul in the 59th minute, however, Enner Valencia would miss the penalty after hitting the post. Two minutes into injury time, Kevin Rodriguez intercepted a cross inside Argentina box and scored the equalizer. After this, the game would go to a penalty shoot-out, in which Argentina would start in disadvantage after Lionel Messi missed his chance. However, Emiliano Martínez would erect his figure in the penalty shoot-outs once again and saved both Ángel Mena and Alan Minda penalties and Argentina would went on to win 4–2, advancing to the semi-finals.

In the semi-finals, Argentina played Canada again. The result from the group stage would repeat itself, a 2–0 win with goals from Álvarez and Messi in the 22nd and 51st minute. With this, Argentina advanced to the final and were playing back-to-back finals for the first time since its 2015 and 2016 run.

=== Colombia ===
Colombia were looking to win their second Copa América and their first outside home soil after their 2001 conquest. The Cafeteros were drawn in group D alongside Brazil, Costa Rica and Paraguay.

The team started their campaign against Paraguay with a 2–1 win with goals from Daniel Muñóz in the 32nd minute and Jefferson Lerma in the 42nd minute, with Paraguay narrowing the difference in the 69th minute with a goal from Julio Enciso. In the second match Colombia faced Costa Rica, who had just draw 0–0 against Brazil in the previous game. Colombia won the game 3–0 with goals from Luis Díaz in the 31st minute with a penalty kick after a Patrick Sequeira foul and goals from Davinson Sánchez in the 59th minute and Jhon Córdoba three minutes later. With this result Colombia was already qualified for the quarter-finals, but had to dispute the first place against Brazil in the final matchday. In the match, Colombia started losing after a Raphinha free-kick in the 12th minute. However the Cafeteros would equalize in the second added minute of the first half with a goal from Daniel Muñóz. The match ended 1-1 and Colombia advanced as in first place.

In the quarter-finals, Colombia faced Panama, who had advanced as the second place from group C. The match saw complete superiority from the Colombians, who entered half time 3–0 up with a goal from Córdoba in the 8th minute, a penalty from James Rodríguez in the 15th and a goal from Díaz in the 41st. In the second half Colombia scored two more goals in the 70th minute from Richard Ríos and another penalty that Miguel Borja scored in the fourth minute of added time. The match ended 5-0 and Colombia advanced to the semi-finals.

Colombia had to face Uruguay in the semi-finals. In a match that was very disputed from both sides, with Muñóz receiving a red card in the 45th minute, Colombia took the lead in the 39th minute with a header from Lerma. Colombia won 1-0 and advanced to the final for the third time in their history (1975 and 2001). After the match, a fight erupted in the stands of the stadium between Colombian fans and Uruguay players.

== Pre-match overcrowding ==
The stadium was expected to be sold-out with a crowd of over 65,000 attendees. Around 5:40 pm EDT, hours before the scheduled kickoff of 8:00 pm EDT, dozens of fans (primarily Colombian fans) jumped over security railings and ran past police officers into the stadium; a few tried to enter through the ventilation system. Several of the incidents occurred at the southwest gate dedicated to journalists, VIPs, and players' families. In response, police officers locked the entrance gates. Around 8:10 pm EDT, stadium security re-opened the gates to avoid a crowd crush and slowly allow ticket-holders into the stadium. Thousands of fans were prevented from entering the stadium due to the incidents.

Hard Rock Stadium issued a statement that "In anticipation of tonight's Copa América final, thousands of fans without tickets attempted to forcibly enter the stadium, putting other fans, security and law enforcement officers at extreme risk." The start of the final match was delayed by 82 minutes until 9:22 pm EDT. An estimated 7,000 people gained entry without tickets. Stadium security continued to check tickets of those inside the stadium and clear crowded aisles while the match was underway.

550 officers from the Miami-Dade Police Department were assigned to the match. Multiple arrests were made for trespassing and battery on a police officer. The Miami-Dade Fire Rescue Department set up an emergency station inside the stadium for fans suffering from heat exhaustion in the 88 °F (31 °C) heat.

== Match ==
=== Summary ===
In the first minute of the game, Gonzalo Montiel set Julián Alvarez in Colombia's penalty spot but he shot the ball wide. Apart from that action, the first 15 minutes of the game were dominated by Colombia, which retained possession of the ball and looked more threatening, which was proved in the 5th minute when Luís Díaz made a shot on Emiliano Martínez right post which he saved. One minute after this action, Santiago Arias sent a long ball on the right side to James Rodríguez, who headed the ball to Jhon Córdoba, who controlled the ball inside the box and made a shot that hit Emiliano Martinez right post and went outside. In the 12th minute, a Colombia corner kick was headed by Carlos Cuesta, but Emiliano Martínez caught the ball before anyone could made a shot on goal. At this point of the game, Argentina had to "cool" the game down to slow Colombia's intensity, which was being very offensive and both wingers were giving problems to the fullbacks. In the 20th minute, Ángel Di María attacked from the left and sent the ball to the box for Lionel Messi to find it, which shot on target but Alvarez unintentionally blocked the shot and changed his direction and power, thus letting Camilo Vargas pick the ball calmly. Córdoba was booked in the 27th minute after a foul on Lisandro Martínez in Argentina's box. In the 33th minute, Jefferson Lerma attempted a long-range shot to Emiliano Martinez's right post, but he managed to fingertip it to the corner kick.

In an Argentinean offensive action two minutes later, Messi dribbled from the left side and into Colombia's box marked by Santiago Arias, which prevented the cross. In the same action, Messi twisted his right ankle, reason for why he got to receive medical assistance immediately and had to leave the pitch a few minutes before coming back. In the 44th minute, a foul on Nicolás Tagliafico by Santiago Arias resulted in a free kick, which Lionel Messi crossed into the box and was headed by Tagliafico himself, but it went above the crossbar. After one minute of added time, the first half ended scoreless.

Shortly after the start of the second half, James Rodríguez crossed the ball into the box from the left and Córdoba headed it to Santiago Arias, who attempted a shot but it went wide. Two minutes later, Alvarez put a through ball into the box for Alexis Mac Allister who, after trying to go around the keeper, passed the ball to Di María who shot directly into Vargas, who saved it. In the 58th minute, Di María received the ball from Tagliafico in three-quarters and started dribbling his way from the left into the box and right before falling he shot, forcing a save by Vargas and a corner kick in favour of Argentina. In the 61st minute, Mac Allister was booked after a foul on James Rodríguez.

One minute after this action, Messi attempted a run after Díaz, when he suddenly fell and immediately asked for a substitution. Even though the medical assistance entered the pitch and tried to make him recover, Messi was unable to step firmly and had to be substituted by Nicolás González. When he got walked off the pitch with assistance, the Argentinean crowd in the stadium started chanting his name and he was seen crying in the bench after being subbed off. Argentina started being more offensive after Messi's substitution and González entry, since he started exploiting the Colombia free spaces behind the defensive line and making runs through the left wing. Shortly after, another injury had to force Lionel Scaloni to make a substitution, when Montiel disputed a ball and fell injured, forcing him to leave the pitch and Nahuel Molina had to replace him. González entry almost paid off in the 74th minute, when a through ball by Enzo Fernández to Tagliafico was crossed into the box for González to put it into the back of the net, but the goal was immediately ruled off because of Tagliafico being offside in the previous action. In the 87th minute, Di María sent a high cross into the box which González head-crossed to Alvarez, who nearly connected the ball, but failing to do so. After four minutes of added time and still in a 0–0 draw, the game went into extra-time. Before this, Nestor Lorenzo made up two substitutions before the start of extra time, taking off Jhon Córdoba and Richard Ríos for Rafael Santos Borré and Kevin Castaño respectively.

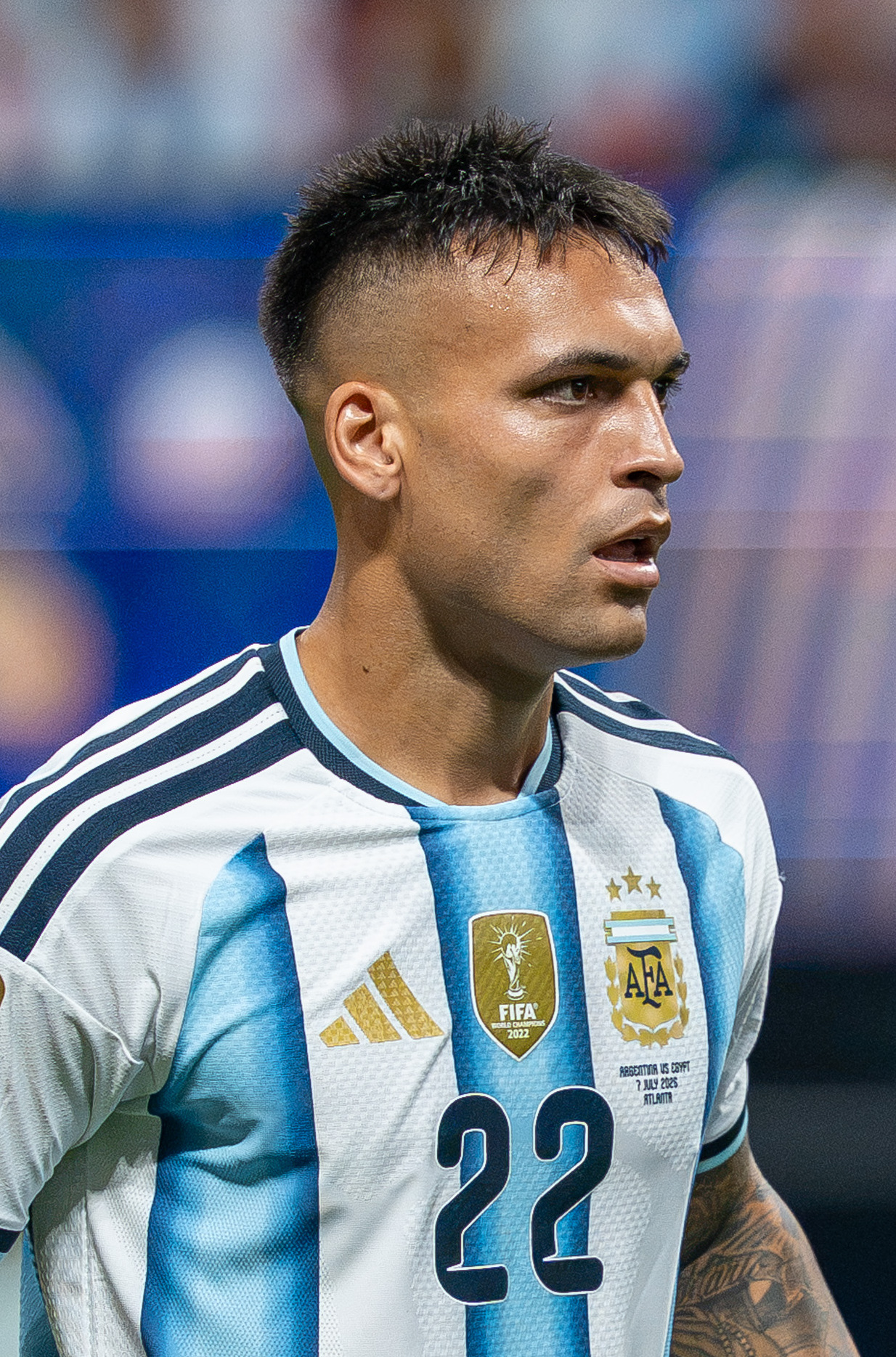
Lautaro Martínez scored the game-winning goal for Argentina.

Before the start of the extra-time, Lorenzo made another substitution, bringing in Juan Fernando Quintero and taking off James Rodríguez. Argentina became dominant and had clear chances, with the most dangerous happening in the 94th minute, when Rodrigo De Paul made a run down the right and made a rasant cross to González, who shot on goal but Vargas saved it in the goal line. Two minutes after this action, Scaloni made a triple substitution, taking Julián Alvarez, Enzo Fernández and Alexis Mac Allister off the pitch and bringing on Lautaro Martínez, Giovani Lo Celso, and Leandro Paredes respectively. Colombia recovered a little bit of intensity in the final minutes of the first half of extra-time and made attacking efforts with runs from Quintero and Jhon Arias or crosses from Johan Mojica but were contained by Cristian Romero, Lisandro Martínez and Paredes. One minute was added and the first half of extra-time ended.

Before the start of the second half, Lorenzo used his last window and Miguel Borja, Jorge Carrascal and Mateus Uribe entered the pitch, subbing Luís Díaz, Jhon Arias and Jefferson Lerma off. In the 107th minute, Di María advanced from the right and crossed the ball into the box; Lautaro Martínez nearly got a touch on it, but couldn't reach. One minute after this action, Miguel Borja received a through ball while being onside and alone into the box and shot at the left post of Emiliano Martinez, but Lisandro Martinez appeared from behind and blocked the shot for a corner. In the 112th minute, the three substitutions made early in extra time by Scaloni paid off, when a counter-attack by Kevin Castaño was cut by Paredes as he recovered the ball in the midfield and passed the ball to Lo Celso, who played a through ball to Lautaro Martínez and escaped Carlos Cuesta, shooting on goal and scoring the 1–0 for Argentina. Immediately after this, Scaloni made a defensive change and took off Ángel Di María for Nicolás Otamendi. After the goal, the match got heated and both Miguel Borja and Giovani Lo Celso received yellow cards. After two minutes of added time in which Colombia attacked mainly with cross balls, the match ended with an Argentina victory.

=== Details ===
July 14, 2024
9:22 pm EDT (UTC−4) (Note: The kickoff time was delayed from the original time of 8:00 pm EDT.)

Argentina	1–0 (a.e.t.)	Colombia
La. Martínez 112'	Report (CONMEBOL); Report (CONCACAF)

Hard Rock Stadium, Miami Gardens, Florida
Attendance: 65,300
Referee: Raphael Claus (Brazil)

Argentina	Colombia

GK	23	Emiliano Martínez
RB	4	Gonzalo Montiel		(substituted off) 72'
CB	13	Cristian Romero
CB	25	Lisandro Martínez
LB	3	Nicolás Tagliafico
RM	11	Ángel Di María		(substituted off) 117'
CM	7	Rodrigo De Paul
CM	24	Enzo Fernández		(substituted off) 97'
LM	20	Alexis Mac Allister	(yellow card) 61'	(substituted off) 97'
CF	10	Lionel Messi (c)		(substituted off) 66'
CF	9	Julián Alvarez		(substituted off) 97'
Substitutions:
FW	15	Nicolás González		(substituted on) 66'
DF	26	Nahuel Molina		(substituted on) 72'
FW	22	Lautaro Martínez		(substituted on) 97'
MF	5	Leandro Paredes		(substituted on) 97'
MF	16	Giovani Lo Celso	(yellow card) 118'	(substituted on) 97'
DF	19	Nicolás Otamendi		(substituted on) 117'
Manager:
Lionel Scaloni

GK	12	Camilo Vargas
RB	4	Santiago Arias
CB	23	Davinson Sánchez
CB	2	Carlos Cuesta
LB	17	Johan Mojica
CM	6	Richard Ríos		(substituted off) 89'
CM	16	Jefferson Lerma		(substituted off) 106'
CM	11	Jhon Arias		(substituted off) 106'
RF	10	James Rodríguez (c)		(substituted off) 91'
CF	24	Jhon Córdoba	(yellow card) 27'	(substituted off) 89'
LF	7	Luis Díaz		(substituted off) 106'
Substitutions:
FW	19	Rafael Santos Borré		(substituted on) 89'
MF	5	Kevin Castaño		(substituted on) 89'
MF	20	Juan Fernando Quintero		(substituted on) 91'
MF	15	Mateus Uribe		(substituted on) 106'
FW	9	Miguel Borja	(yellow card) 115'	(substituted on) 106'
MF	8	Jorge Carrascal		(substituted on) 106'
Manager:
(Argentina) Néstor Lorenzo

Man of the Match:
Ángel Di María (Argentina)

Assistant referees:
Bruno Pires (Brazil)
Rodrigo Correa (Brazil)
Fourth official:
Juan Gabriel Benítez (Paraguay)
Fifth official:
Eduardo Cardozo (Paraguay)
Video assistant referee:
Rodolpho Toski (Brazil)
Assistant video assistant referees:
Danilo Manis (Brazil)
Daniel Nobre (Brazil)
Pablo Gonçalves (Brazil)

Match rules

- 90 minutes
- 30 minutes of extra time if necessary
- Penalty shoot-out if scores still level
- Maximum of fifteen named substitutes
- Maximum of five substitutions, with a sixth allowed in extra time
- Maximum of three substitution opportunities, with a fourth allowed in extra time

== Post-match ==
The match was the last international appearance of Ángel Di María, who was named Man of the Match.

=== Security breaches and arrests ===
The Miami-Dade Police Department reported making 27 arrests and 55 ejections at the match. Ramón Jesurún, President of the Colombian Football Federation, was not present at the awards ceremony; he and his son Ramón Jamil Jesurún were arrested for three felony counts of battery and are accused of fighting multiple security guards. On July 16, the Colombia Football Federation issued a statement regretting the incident and apologizing to the tournament organizers, the host country, and the people in attendance who were affected. In addition, the Colombian Football Federation statement also claimed that Jesurún deeply regrets what happened. CONMEBOL also released a statement claiming that it bears “regret that the acts of violence caused by malicious individuals have tarnished a final that was ready to be a great sports celebration," but avoided addressing Jesurún's arrest.

ESPN reported that Hard Rock Stadium was left with significant damage after the event, including shattered escalator railings and bent security railings.

CONMEBOL released a statement after the match that blamed local stadium officials for not implementing its recommended safety procedures. Stadium officials responded with a statement that said that they implemented and exceeded CONMEBOL's security recommendations. CONCACAF told The Athletic that "matchday ops, security, the physical running of the tournament is 100 per cent CONMEBOL."

=== Argentina team celebrations ===
The French Football Federation announced on July 16 that it would file legal complaints against the Argentina national team over "unacceptable, racist and discriminatory" chants that Argentina players shared on social media during their post-match celebrations. Investigations into the chants were also launched by FIFA and Chelsea F.C., the club of Enzo Fernández who shared a video of the chants on social media.

Former Argentine undersecretary of sport Julio Garro said that the Argentina team's captain, Lionel Messi, and the AFA president, Claudio Tapia, should apologize for the offensive songs. The next day, the Argentine government fired him.
