= Colombia national football team results (1926–1979) =

This page details the match results and statistics of the Colombia national football team from 1926 to 1979.

== Key ==
Key to matches

- Att.=Match attendance
- (H)=Home ground
- (A)=Away ground
- (N)=Neutral ground

Key to record by opponent

- Pld=Games played
- W=Games won
- D=Games drawn
- L=Games lost
- GF=Goals for
- GA=Goals against

== Results ==
Colombia's score is shown first in each case.

No.	Date	Venue	Opponents	Score	Competition	Colombia scorers	Att.	Ref.
1	17 February 1926	Julio Torres Stadium, Barranquilla (H)	Costa Rica	4–1	Friendly		—	
2	10 February 1938	Estadio Olímpico, Panama City (N)	Mexico	1–3	1938 Central American and Caribbean Games	M. Mejía	—	
3	14 February 1938	Estadio Olímpico, Panama City (N)	Panama	4–2	1938 Central American and Caribbean Games	Meléndez (2), Torres (2)	—	
4	18 February 1938	Estadio Olímpico, Panama City (N)	Costa Rica	1–2	1938 Central American and Caribbean Games	M. Mejía	—	
5	21 February 1938	Estadio Olímpico, Panama City (N)	El Salvador	3–2	1938 Central American and Caribbean Games	Meléndez (2), M. Mejía	—	
6	23 February 1938	Estadio Olímpico, Panama City (N)	Venezuela	1–2	1938 Central American and Caribbean Games	R. Mejía	—	
7	8 August 1938	Estadio Universitario, Bogotá (N)	Peru	2–4	1938 Bolivarian Games	Botto (2)	—	
8	10 August 1938	Estadio El Campín, Bogotá (N)	Ecuador	1–2	1938 Bolivarian Games	Mier	—	
9	13 August 1938	Estadio Universitario, Bogotá (N)	Venezuela	2–0	1938 Bolivarian Games	Umaña, Torres	—	
10	16 August 1938	Estadio Universitario, Bogotá (N)	Bolivia	1–2	1938 Bolivarian Games	R. Mejía	—	
11	21 January 1945	Estadio Nacional, Santiago (N)	Brazil	0–3	1945 South American Championship		60,000	
12	28 January 1945	Estadio Nacional, Santiago (N)	Uruguay	0–7	1945 South American Championship		28,000	
13	31 January 1945	Estadio Nacional, Santiago (N)	Chile	0–2	1945 South American Championship		60,000	
14	7 February 1945	Estadio Nacional, Santiago (N)	Argentina	1–9	1945 South American Championship	Mendoza	60,000	
15	18 February 1945	Estadio Nacional, Santiago (N)	Ecuador	3–1	1945 South American Championship	L. González, Gámez, Berdugo	65,000	
16	21 February 1945	Estadio Nacional, Santiago (N)	Bolivia	3–3	1945 South American Championship	L. González, Berdugo, Gámez	22,000	
17	9 December 1946	Estadio Municipal, Barranquilla (H)	Curaçao	4–2	1946 Central American and Caribbean Games	L. González, Granados (2), Arango	—	
18	12 December 1946	Estadio Municipal, Barranquilla (H)	Venezuela	2–0	1946 Central American and Caribbean Games	Berdugo, Granados	—	
19	15 December 1946	Estadio Municipal, Barranquilla (H)	Guatemala	4–2	1946 Central American and Caribbean Games	Carrillo (3), Arango	—	
20	16 December 1946	Estadio Municipal, Barranquilla (H)	Puerto Rico	4–1	1946 Central American and Caribbean Games	Berdugo, Cardona, Ruiz	—	
21	18 December 1946	Estadio Municipal, Barranquilla (H)	Costa Rica	4–1	1946 Central American and Caribbean Games	Arango, García, Granados, L. González	—	
22	20 December 1946	Estadio Municipal, Barranquilla (H)	Panama	2–1	1946 Central American and Caribbean Games	L. González, Arango	—	
23	2 December 1947	Estadio George Capwell, Guayaquil (N)	Uruguay	0–2	1947 South American Championship		20,000	
24	4 December 1947	Estadio George Capwell, Guayaquil (N)	Ecuador	0–0	1947 South American Championship		30,000	
25	13 December 1947	Estadio George Capwell, Guayaquil (N)	Bolivia	0–0	1947 South American Championship		18,000	
26	18 December 1947	Estadio George Capwell, Guayaquil (N)	Argentina	0–6	1947 South American Championship		12,000	
27	20 December 1947	Estadio George Capwell, Guayaquil (N)	Paraguay	0–2	1947 South American Championship		20,000	
28	23 December 1947	Estadio George Capwell, Guayaquil (N)	Peru	1–5	1947 South American Championship	Arango	5,000	
29	27 December 1947	Estadio George Capwell, Guayaquil (N)	Chile	1–4	1947 South American Championship	Granados	5,000	
30	6 April 1949	Pacaembu Stadium, São Paulo (N)	Paraguay	0–3	1949 South American Championship		30,000	
31	10 April 1949	Estádio São Januário, Rio de Janeiro (N)	Peru	0–4	1949 South American Championship		15,000	
32	17 April 1949	Pacaembu Stadium, São Paulo (N)	Brazil	0–5	1949 South American Championship		45,000	
33	20 April 1949	Estádio São Januário, Rio de Janeiro (N)	Chile	1–1	1949 South American Championship	Berdugo	7,000	
34	25 April 1949	Pacaembu Stadium, São Paulo (N)	Uruguay	2–2	1949 South American Championship	Gastelbondo, A. Pérez	14,000	
35	3 May 1949	Estádio São Januário, Rio de Janeiro (N)	Ecuador	1–4	1949 South American Championship	N. Pérez	3,000	
36	6 May 1949	Estádio General Severiano, Rio de Janeiro (N)	Bolivia	0–4	1949 South American Championship		12,000	
37	13 March 1957	Estadio Nacional, Lima (N)	Argentina	2–8	1957 South American Championship	Gamboa, Valencia	42,000	
38	17 March 1957	Estadio Nacional, Lima (N)	Uruguay	1–0	1957 South American Championship	Arango	50,000	
39	21 March 1957	Estadio Nacional, Lima (N)	Chile	2–3	1957 South American Championship	Arango, Carillo	45,000	
40	24 March 1957	Estadio Nacional, Lima (N)	Brazil	0–9	1957 South American Championship		45,000	
41	27 March 1957	Estadio Nacional, Lima (N)	Peru	1–4	1957 South American Championship	Arango	55,000	
42	1 April 1957	Estadio Nacional, Lima (N)	Ecuador	4–1	1957 South American Championship	Álvarez, Gutiérrez, Gamboa (2)	40,000	
43	16 June 1957	Estadio El Campín, Bogotá (H)	Uruguay	1–1	1958 FIFA World Cup qualification	Arango	15,000	
44	20 June 1957	Estadio El Campín, Bogotá (H)	Paraguay	2–3	1958 FIFA World Cup qualification	Gutiérrez, R. Díaz	—	
45	23 June 1957	Estadio Atanasio Girardot, Medellín (H)	Paraguay	1–2	Friendly	Panesso	—	
46	30 June 1957	Estadio Centenario, Montevideo (A)	Uruguay	0–1	1958 FIFA World Cup qualification		35,000	
47	7 July 1957	Estadio Defensores del Chaco, Asunción (A)	Paraguay	0–3	1958 FIFA World Cup qualification		—	
48	5 February 1961	Estadio El Campín, Bogotá (H)	United States	2–0	Friendly	Aceros, Gamboa	—	
49	30 April 1961	Estadio El Campín, Bogotá (H)	Peru	1–0	1962 FIFA World Cup qualification	Escobar	—	
50	7 May 1961	Estadio Nacional, Lima (A)	Peru	1–1	1962 FIFA World Cup qualification	H. González	—	
51	1 April 1962	Estadio El Campín, Bogotá (H)	Mexico	0–1	Friendly		30,000	
52	4 April 1962	Estadio Olímpico Pascual Guerrero, Cali (H)	Mexico	2–2	Friendly	Klinger, Rada	32,000	
53	25 April 1962	Estadio Olímpico Universitario, Mexico City (A)	Mexico	0–1	Friendly		65,000	
54	30 May 1962	Estadio Carlos Dittborn, Arica (N)	Uruguay	1–2	1962 FIFA World Cup	Zuluaga	7,908	
55	3 June 1962	Estadio Carlos Dittborn, Arica (N)	Soviet Union	4–4	1962 FIFA World Cup	Germán Aceros, Coll, Rada, Klinger	8,040	
56	7 June 1962	Estadio Carlos Dittborn, Arica (N)	Yugoslavia	0–5	1962 FIFA World Cup		7,167	
57	10 March 1963	Estadio Félix Capriles, Cochabamba (N)	Argentina	2–4	1963 South American Championship	Campillo, Aceros	18,000	
58	14 March 1963	Estadio Hernando Siles, La Paz (N)	Brazil	1–5	1963 South American Championship	Gamboa	15,000	
59	17 March 1963	Estadio Félix Capriles, Cochabamba (N)	Bolivia	1–2	1963 South American Championship	Botero	18,000	
60	20 March 1963	Estadio Félix Capriles, Cochabamba (N)	Paraguay	2–3	1963 South American Championship	Campillo, Calonga (o.g.)	10,000	
61	24 March 1963	Estadio Hernando Siles, La Paz (N)	Peru	1–1	1963 South American Championship	F. González	10,000	
62	31 March 1963	Estadio Hernando Siles, La Paz (N)	Ecuador	3–4	1963 South American Championship	Aceros, Botero, H. González	15,000	
63	1 September 1963	Estadio El Campín, Bogotá (H)	Costa Rica	4–5	Friendly	Aceros, Gamboa, Coll, Toscano	—	
64	4 September 1963	Estadio Olímpico Pascual Guerrero, Cali (H)	Costa Rica	1–0	Friendly	Coll	—	
65	20 July 1965	Romelio Martínez Stadium, Barranquilla (H)	Ecuador	0–1	1966 FIFA World Cup qualification		10,175	
66	25 July 1965	Estadio Modelo, Guayaquil (A)	Ecuador	0–2	1966 FIFA World Cup qualification		48,457	
67	1 August 1965	Estadio Nacional, Santiago (A)	Chile	2–7	1966 FIFA World Cup qualification	Segrera (2)	70,052	
68	7 August 1965	Romelio Martínez Stadium, Barranquilla (H)	Chile	2–0	1966 FIFA World Cup qualification	Rada (2)	4,401	
69	30 November 1966	Estadio Nacional, Santiago (A)	Chile	2–5	1967 South American Championship qualification	Gamboa, Cañón	80,000	
70	11 December 1966	Estadio El Campín, Bogotá (H)	Chile	0–0	1967 South American Championship qualification		17,000	
71	16 October 1968	Estadio El Campín, Bogotá (H)	Mexico	0–1	Friendly		17,000	
72	4 February 1969	Estadio León, León (A)	Mexico	0–1	Friendly		—	
73	20 February 1969	Estadio El Campín, Bogotá (H)	Soviet Union	1–3	Friendly	Santa	60,000	
74	8 May 1969	Estadio El Campín, Bogotá (H)	Peru	1–3	Friendly	J. González	23,000	
75	15 June 1969	Estadio El Campín, Bogotá (H)	Chile	3–3	Friendly	G. González (2), Ramírez	50,000	
76	18 June 1969	Estadio Nacional, Lima (A)	Peru	1–1	Friendly	Ramírez	—	
77	22 June 1969	Estadio Modelo, Guayaquil (A)	Ecuador	1–4	Friendly	J. González	15,000	
78	2 July 1969	Estadio El Campín, Bogotá (H)	Uruguay	0–1	Friendly		43,000	
79	27 July 1969	Estadio El Campín, Bogotá (H)	Venezuela	3–0	1970 FIFA World Cup qualification	J. González (2), Segrera	47,984	
80	2 August 1969	Olympic Stadium, Caracas (A)	Venezuela	1–1	1970 FIFA World Cup qualification	Tamayo	17,101	
81	6 August 1969	Estadio El Campín, Bogotá (H)	Brazil	0–2	1970 FIFA World Cup qualification		51,131	
82	10 August 1969	Estadio El Campín, Bogotá (H)	Paraguay	0–1	1970 FIFA World Cup qualification		51,049	
83	21 August 1969	Maracanã Stadium, Rio de Janeiro (A)	Brazil	2–6	1970 FIFA World Cup qualification	Mesa, Ramírez	99,947	
84	24 August 1969	Estadio Defensores del Chaco, Asunción (A)	Paraguay	1–2	1970 FIFA World Cup qualification	Segrera	14,744	
85	20 May 1970	Estadio El Campín, Bogotá (H)	England	0–4	Friendly		36,000	
86	29 March 1972	Estadio El Campín, Bogotá (H)	Peru	1–1	Friendly	Morón	—	
87	3 June 1972	Olympic Stadium, Caracas (A)	Venezuela	1–2	Friendly	Brand	—	
88	6 June 1972	Estadio Nacional, Lima (A)	Peru	0–0	Friendly		—	
89	18 June 1972	Estádio Fonte Nova, Salvador (N)	France	2–3	Brazil Independence Cup	Piñeros, Mesa	—	
90	22 June 1972	Estádio Fonte Nova, Salvador (N)	Argentina	1–4	Brazil Independence Cup	Morón	—	
91	15 February 1973	Estadio El Campín, Bogotá (H)	East Germany	0–2	Friendly		35,000	
92	27 May 1973	Stade Sylvio Cator, Port-au-Prince (A)	Haiti	2–1	Friendly	Morón, E. Díaz	—	
93	29 May 1973	Stade Sylvio Cator, Port-au-Prince (A)	Haiti	1–2	Friendly	Morón	—	
94	21 June 1973	Estadio El Campín, Bogotá (H)	Ecuador	1–1	1974 FIFA World Cup qualification	Ortiz	43,497	
95	24 June 1973	Estadio El Campín, Bogotá (H)	Uruguay	0–0	1974 FIFA World Cup qualification		30,000	
96	28 June 1973	Estadio Modelo, Guayaquil (A)	Ecuador	1–1	1974 FIFA World Cup qualification	Ortiz	46,979	
97	1 July 1973	Estadio Nacional, Lima (A)	Peru	1–3	Friendly	Morón	—	
98	5 July 1973	Estadio Centenario, Montevideo (A)	Uruguay	1–0	1974 FIFA World Cup qualification	Ortiz	54,917	
99	20 July 1975	Estadio El Campín, Bogotá (H)	Paraguay	1–0	1975 Copa América	E. Díaz	60,000	
100	27 July 1975	Estadio Olímpico Atahualpa, Quito (A)	Ecuador	3–1	1975 Copa América	Ortiz, Retat, Castro	45,000	
101	30 July 1975	Estadio Defensores del Chaco, Asunción (A)	Paraguay	1–0	1975 Copa América	E. Díaz	50,000	
102	7 August 1975	Estadio El Campín, Bogotá (H)	Ecuador	2–0	1975 Copa América	E. Díaz, Calero	50,000	
103	21 September 1975	Estadio El Campín, Bogotá (H)	Uruguay	3–0	1975 Copa América	Angulo, Ortiz, E. Díaz	55,000	
104	1 October 1975	Estadio Centenario, Montevideo (A)	Uruguay	0–1	1975 Copa América		70,000	
105	16 October 1975	Estadio El Campín, Bogotá (H)	Peru	1–0	1975 Copa América	Castro	50,000	
106	22 October 1975	Estadio Nacional, Lima (A)	Peru	0–2	1975 Copa América		50,000	
107	28 October 1975	Olympic Stadium, Caracas (N)	Peru	0–1	1975 Copa América		30,000	
108	15 October 1976	Estadio El Campín, Bogotá (H)	Uruguay	1–2	Friendly	Vilarete	39,129	
109	16 January 1977	Estadio El Campín, Bogotá (H)	Ecuador	0–1	Friendly		50,000	
110	26 January 1977	Estadio Olímpico Atahualpa, Quito (A)	Ecuador	1–4	Friendly	Retat	—	
111	30 January 1977	Estadio El Campín, Bogotá (H)	Yugoslavia	0–1	Friendly		35,000	
112	20 February 1977	Estadio El Campín, Bogotá (H)	Brazil	0–0	1978 FIFA World Cup qualification		55,439	
113	24 February 1977	Estadio El Campín, Bogotá (H)	Paraguay	0–1	1978 FIFA World Cup qualification		45,838	
114	6 March 1977	Estadio Defensores del Chaco, Asunción (A)	Paraguay	1–1	1978 FIFA World Cup qualification	Vilarete	30,154	
115	9 March 1977	Maracanã Stadium, Rio de Janeiro (A)	Brazil	0–6	1978 FIFA World Cup qualification		132,764	
116	18 July 1979	Estadio Nacional, Lima (A)	Peru	1–0	Friendly	Ortiz	—	
117	25 July 1979	Estadio El Campín, Bogotá (H)	Peru	1–2	Friendly	Ortiz	—	
118	1 August 1979	Estadio Polideportivo de Pueblo Nuevo, San Cristóbal (A)	Venezuela	0–0	1979 Copa América		18,000	
119	15 August 1979	Estadio El Campín, Bogotá (H)	Chile	1–0	1979 Copa América	E. Díaz	45,000	
120	22 August 1979	Estadio El Campín, Bogotá (H)	Venezuela	4–0	1979 Copa América	Iguarán, Valverde, Chaparro, Morón	30,000	
121	5 September 1979	Estadio Nacional, Santiago (A)	Chile	0–2	1979 Copa América		85,000	

Notes

1. A: After 65 minutes, Colombia left the pitch in protest at a penalty awarded to Costa Rica. The penalty was scored into an empty goal and the match was ended with the score 3–1 to Costa Rica. However, a protest by the Colombian delegate resulted in the penalty being annulled with the score at the time the Colombians left the field declared final.
2. B: The Paraguay vs Colombia match at the 1975 Copa América was abandoned after 43 minutes. The result was allowed to stand.

== Record by opponent ==
Team	Pld	W	D	L	GF	GA	GD	WPCT
Argentina	5	0	0	5	6	31	−25	0.00
Bolivia	5	0	2	3	5	11	−6	0.00
Brazil	8	0	1	7	3	36	−33	0.00
Chile	11	2	3	6	14	27	−13	18.18
Costa Rica	5	3	0	2	14	9	+5	60.00
Curaçao	1	1	0	0	4	2	+2	100.00
East Germany	1	0	0	1	0	2	−2	0.00
Ecuador	15	4	3	8	21	27	−6	26.67
El Salvador	1	1	0	0	3	2	+1	100.00
England	1	0	0	1	0	4	−4	0.00
France	1	0	0	1	2	3	−1	0.00
Guatemala	1	1	0	0	4	2	+2	100.00
Haiti	2	1	0	1	3	3	0	50.00
Mexico	6	0	1	5	3	9	−6	0.00
Panama	2	2	0	0	6	3	+3	100.00
Paraguay	12	2	1	9	9	21	−12	16.67
Peru	17	3	5	9	14	32	−18	17.65
Puerto Rico	1	1	0	0	4	1	+3	100.00
Soviet Union	2	0	1	1	5	7	−2	0.00
United States	1	1	0	0	2	0	+2	100.00
Uruguay	13	3	3	7	10	19	−9	23.08
Venezuela	8	4	2	2	14	5	+9	50.00
Yugoslavia	2	0	0	2	0	6	−6	0.00
Total	121	29	22	70	146	262	−116	23.97

Source: Results
