= Colombia national football team results (2020–present) =

This page details the match results and statistics of the Colombia national football team from 2020 to present.

== Key ==
Key to matches

- Att.=Match attendance
- (H)=Home ground
- (A)=Away ground
- (N)=Neutral ground

Key to record by opponent

- Pld=Games played
- W=Games won
- D=Games drawn
- L=Games lost
- GF=Goals for
- GA=Goals against

== Results ==
Colombia's score is shown first in each case.

No.	Date	Venue	Opponents	Score	Competition	Colombia scorers	Att.	Ref.
579	9 October 2020	Estadio Metropolitano, Barranquilla (H)	Venezuela	3–0	2022 FIFA World Cup qualification	D. Zapata, Muriel (2)	0	
580	13 October 2020	Estadio Nacional, Santiago (A)	Chile	2–2	2022 FIFA World Cup qualification	Lerma, Falcao	0	
581	13 November 2020	Estadio Metropolitano, Barranquilla (H)	Uruguay	0–3	2022 FIFA World Cup qualification		0	
582	17 November 2020	Estadio Rodrigo Paz Delgado, Quito (A)	Ecuador	1–6	2022 FIFA World Cup qualification	Rodríguez	0	
583	3 June 2021	Estadio Nacional, Lima (A)	Peru	3–0	2022 FIFA World Cup qualification	Mina, Uribe, Díaz	0	
584	8 June 2021	Estadio Metropolitano, Barranquilla (H)	Argentina	2–2	2022 FIFA World Cup qualification	Muriel, Borja	0	
585	13 June 2021	Arena Pantanal, Cuiabá (N)	Ecuador	1–0	2021 Copa América	Cardona	0	
586	17 June 2021	Estádio Olímpico Pedro Ludovico, Goiânia (N)	Venezuela	0–0	2021 Copa América		0	
587	20 June 2021	Estádio Olímpico Pedro Ludovico, Goiânia (N)	Peru	1–2	2021 Copa América	Borja	0	
588	23 June 2021	Estádio Olímpico Nilton Santos, Rio de Janeiro (N)	Brazil	1–2	2021 Copa América	Díaz	0	
589	3 July 2021	Estádio Nacional Mané Garrincha, Brasília (N)	Uruguay	0–0 (4–2p)	2021 Copa América		0	
590	6 July 2021	Estádio Nacional Mané Garrincha, Brasília (N)	Argentina	1–1 (2–3p)	2021 Copa América	Díaz	0	
591	9 July 2021	Estádio Nacional Mané Garrincha, Brasília (N)	Peru	3–2	2021 Copa América	Cuadrado, Díaz (2)	0	
592	2 September 2021	Estadio Hernando Siles, La Paz (A)	Bolivia	1–1	2022 FIFA World Cup qualification	Martínez	15,000	
593	5 September 2021	Estadio Defensores del Chaco, Asunción (A)	Paraguay	1–1	2022 FIFA World Cup qualification	Cuadrado	7,000	
594	9 September 2021	Estadio Metropolitano, Barranquilla (H)	Chile	3–1	2022 FIFA World Cup qualification	Borja (2), Díaz	23,500	
595	7 October 2021	Estadio Gran Parque Central, Montevideo (A)	Uruguay	0–0	2022 FIFA World Cup qualification		18,000	
596	10 October 2021	Estadio Metropolitano, Barranquilla (H)	Brazil	0–0	2022 FIFA World Cup qualification		35,000	
597	14 October 2021	Estadio Metropolitano, Barranquilla (H)	Ecuador	0–0	2022 FIFA World Cup qualification		35,000	
598	11 November 2021	Arena Corinthians, São Paulo (A)	Brazil	0–1	2022 FIFA World Cup qualification		20,080	
599	16 November 2021	Estadio Metropolitano, Barranquilla (H)	Paraguay	0–0	2022 FIFA World Cup qualification		44,000	
600	16 January 2022	DRV PNK Stadium, Fort Lauderdale (N)	Honduras	2–1	Friendly	Quintero, Colorado	—	
601	28 January 2022	Estadio Metropolitano, Barranquilla (H)	Peru	0–1	2022 FIFA World Cup qualification		41,000	
602	1 February 2022	Estadio Mario Alberto Kempes, Córdoba (A)	Argentina	0–1	2022 FIFA World Cup qualification		50,000	
603	24 March 2022	Estadio Metropolitano, Barranquilla (H)	Bolivia	3–0	2022 FIFA World Cup qualification	Díaz, Borja, Uribe	25,000	
604	29 March 2022	Polideportivo Cachamay, Ciudad Guayana (A)	Venezuela	1–0	2022 FIFA World Cup qualification	Rodríguez	—	
605	5 June 2022	Estadio Nueva Condomina, Murcia (N)	Saudi Arabia	1–0	Friendly	Borré	—	
606	24 September 2022	Red Bull Arena, Harrison (N)	Guatemala	4–1	Friendly	Rodríguez, Sinisterra, Borré, Asprilla	—	
607	27 September 2022	Levi's Stadium, Santa Clara (N)	Mexico	3–2	Friendly	Sinisterra (2), Barrios	—	
608	19 November 2022	DRV PNK Stadium, Fort Lauderdale (N)	Paraguay	2–0	Friendly	Sánchez, Falcao	—	
609	28 January 2023	Dignity Health Sports Park, Carson (A)	United States	0–0	Friendly		27,000	
610	24 March 2023	Ulsan Munsu Football Stadium, Ulsan (A)	South Korea	2–2	Friendly	Rodríguez, Carrascal	35,727	
611	28 March 2023	Yodoko Sakura Stadium, Osaka (A)	Japan	2–1	2023 Kirin Challenge Cup	Durán, Borré	20,005	
612	16 June 2023	Mestalla Stadium, Valencia (N)	Iraq	1–0	Friendly	Cassierra	—	
613	20 June 2023	Arena AufSchalke, Gelsenkirchen (A)	Germany	2–0	Friendly	Díaz, Cuadrado	50,421	
614	7 September 2023	Estadio Metropolitano, Barranquilla (H)	Venezuela	1–0	2026 FIFA World Cup qualification	Borré	43,084	
615	12 September 2023	Estadio Monumental David Arellano, Santiago (A)	Chile	0–0	2026 FIFA World Cup qualification		37,081	
616	12 October 2023	Estadio Metropolitano, Barranquilla (H)	Uruguay	2–2	2026 FIFA World Cup qualification	Rodríguez, Uribe	13,915	
617	17 October 2023	Estadio Rodrigo Paz Delgado, Quito (A)	Ecuador	0–0	2026 FIFA World Cup qualification		38,702	
618	16 November 2023	Estadio Metropolitano, Barranquilla (H)	Brazil	2–1	2026 FIFA World Cup qualification	Díaz (2)	44,604	
619	21 November 2023	Estadio Defensores del Chaco, Asunción (A)	Paraguay	1–0	2026 FIFA World Cup qualification	Borré	25,190	
620	10 December 2023	DRV PNK Stadium, Fort Lauderdale (N)	Venezuela	1–0	Friendly	Ferro (o.g.)	50,421	
621	16 December 2023	Los Angeles Memorial Coliseum, Los Angeles (N)	Mexico	3–2	Friendly	Reyes, R. Martínez, A. Gómez	—	
622	22 March 2024	London Stadium, London (N)	Spain	1–0	Friendly	Muñoz	—	
623	26 March 2024	Metropolitano Stadium, Madrid (N)	Romania	3–2	Friendly	Córdoba, J. Arias, Asprilla	—	
624	8 June 2024	Commanders Field, Landover (A)	United States	5–1	Friendly	J. Arias, Borré, Ríos, Carrascal, Sinisterra	55,494	
625	15 June 2024	Empower Field at Mile High, Denver (N)	Bolivia	3–0	Friendly	J. Arias, Córdoba, Díaz	47,873	
626	24 June 2024	NRG Stadium, Houston (N)	Paraguay	2–1	2024 Copa América	Muñoz, Lerma	67,059	
627	28 June 2024	State Farm Stadium, Glendale (N)	Costa Rica	3–0	2024 Copa América	Díaz, Sánchez, Córdoba	27,386	
628	2 July 2024	Levi's Stadium, Santa Clara (N)	Brazil	1–1	2024 Copa América	Muñoz	70,971	
629	6 July 2024	State Farm Stadium, Glendale (N)	Panama	5–0	2024 Copa América	Córdoba, Rodríguez, Díaz, Ríos, Borja	39,740	
630	10 July 2024	Bank of America Stadium, Charlotte (N)	Uruguay	1–0	2024 Copa América	Lerma	70,644	
631	14 July 2024	Hard Rock Stadium, Miami Gardens (N)	Argentina	0–1 (a.e.t.)	2024 Copa América		65,300	
632	6 September 2024	Estadio Nacional, Lima (A)	Peru	1–1	2026 FIFA World Cup qualification	Díaz	40,000	
633	10 September 2024	Estadio Metropolitano, Barranquilla (H)	Argentina	2–1	2026 FIFA World Cup qualification	Mosquera, Rodríguez	45,000	
634	10 October 2024	Estadio Municipal de El Alto, El Alto (A)	Bolivia	0–1	2026 FIFA World Cup qualification		17,191	
635	15 October 2024	Estadio Metropolitano, Barranquilla (H)	Chile	4–0	2026 FIFA World Cup qualification	Sánchez, Díaz, Durán, Sinisterra	45,000	
636	15 November 2024	Estadio Centenario, Montevideo (A)	Uruguay	2–3	2026 FIFA World Cup qualification	Sánchez, Quintero, Gómez	33,400	
637	19 November 2024	Estadio Metropolitano, Barranquilla (H)	Ecuador	0–1	2026 FIFA World Cup qualification		37,316	
638	20 March 2025	Estádio Nacional Mané Garrincha, Brasília (A)	Brazil	1–2	2026 FIFA World Cup qualification	Díaz	70,027	
639	25 March 2025	Estadio Metropolitano, Barranquilla (H)	Paraguay	2–2	2026 FIFA World Cup qualification	Díaz, Durán	42,262	
640	6 June 2025	Estadio Metropolitano, Barranquilla (H)	Peru	0–0	2026 FIFA World Cup qualification		43,933	
641	10 June 2025	Estadio Monumental, Buenos Aires (A)	Argentina	1–1	2026 FIFA World Cup qualification	Díaz	77,791	
642	4 September 2025	Estadio Metropolitano, Barranquilla (H)	Bolivia	3–0	2026 FIFA World Cup qualification	J. Rodríguez, Córdoba, Quintero	—	
643	9 September 2025	Estadio Monumental, Maturín (A)	Venezuela	6–3	2026 FIFA World Cup qualification	Mina, Suárez (4), Córdoba	—	
644	11 October 2025	AT&T Stadium, Arlington (N)	Mexico	4–0	Friendly	Lucumí, Díaz, Lerma, Carbonero	—	
645	14 October 2025	Sports Illustrated Stadium, Harrison (N)	Canada	0–0	Friendly		—	
646	15 November 2025	Chase Stadium, Fort Lauderdale (N)	New Zealand	2–1	Friendly	Puerta, Carbonero	—	
647	18 November 2025	Citi Field, New York (N)	Australia	3–0	Friendly	Rodríguez, Díaz, Lerma	—	
648	26 March 2026	Camping World Stadium, Orlando (N)	Croatia	1–2	Friendly	Arias	—	
649	29 March 2026	Northwest Stadium, Landover (N)	France	1–3	Friendly	Campaz	—	
650	29 May 2026	Estadio El Campín, Bogotá (H)	Costa Rica	3–1	Friendly	Sánchez, Díaz, Suárez	—	
651	7 June 2026	Snapdragon Stadium, San Diego (N)	Jordan	2–0	Friendly	J. Arias (2)	—	
652	17 June 2026	Estadio Azteca, Mexico City (N)	Uzbekistan	3–1	2026 FIFA World Cup	Muñoz, Díaz, Campaz	80,824	
653	23 June 2026	Estadio Akron, Zapopan (N)	DR Congo	1–0	2026 FIFA World Cup	Muñoz	45,358	
654	27 June 2026	Hard Rock Stadium, Miami Gardens (N)	Portugal	0–0	2026 FIFA World Cup		64,478	
655	3 July 2026	Arrowhead Stadium, Kansas City (N)	Ghana	1–0	2026 FIFA World Cup	Arias	69,045	
656	7 July 2026	BC Place, Vancouver (N)	Switzerland	0–0 (3–4p)	2026 FIFA World Cup		52,497	
657	26 September 2026	M&T Bank Stadium, Baltimore (N)	Mexico	1–1	Friendly	Suárez	—	
658	2 October 2026	Sports Illustrated Stadium, Harrison (N)	Paraguay	0–1	Friendly		—	
659	6 October 2026	Nu Stadium, Miami (N)	Peru	2–0	Friendly	Velásquez, Arcila	—	
660	13 November 2026	Estadio Olímpico Pascual Guerrero, Cali (H)	Chile		Friendly			
661	17 November 2026	Estadio Nacional Julio Martínez Prádanos, Santiago (A)	Chile		Friendly			

Notes

1. A: Match held behind closed doors due to the COVID-19 pandemic in South America.
2. B: Matches due to be held in March 2021 were postponed due to travel and quarantine restrictions caused by the COVID-19 pandemic. These matches were instead played in September and October 2021.

== Record by opponent ==
Team	Pld	W	D	L	GF	GA	GD	WPCT
Argentina	6	1	3	2	6	7	−1	16.67
Australia	1	1	0	0	3	0	+3	100.00
Bolivia	5	3	1	1	10	2	+8	60.00
Brazil	6	1	2	3	5	7	−2	16.67
Canada	1	0	1	0	0	0	0	0.00
Chile	4	2	2	0	9	3	+6	50.00
Costa Rica	2	2	0	0	6	1	+5	100.00
Croatia	1	0	0	1	1	2	−1	0.00
DR Congo	1	1	0	0	1	0	+1	100.00
Ecuador	5	1	2	2	2	7	−5	20.00
France	1	0	0	1	1	3	−2	0.00
Germany	1	1	0	0	2	0	+2	100.00
Ghana	1	1	0	0	1	0	+1	100.00
Guatemala	1	1	0	0	4	1	+3	100.00
Honduras	1	1	0	0	2	1	+1	100.00
Iraq	1	1	0	0	1	0	+1	100.00
Japan	1	1	0	0	2	1	+1	100.00
Jordan	1	1	0	0	2	0	+2	100.00
Mexico	4	3	1	0	11	5	+6	75.00
New Zealand	1	1	0	0	2	1	+1	100.00
Panama	1	1	0	0	5	0	+5	100.00
Paraguay	7	3	3	1	8	5	+3	42.86
Peru	7	3	2	2	10	6	+4	42.86
Portugal	1	0	1	0	0	0	0	0.00
Romania	1	1	0	0	3	2	+1	100.00
Saudi Arabia	1	1	0	0	1	0	+1	100.00
South Korea	1	0	1	0	2	2	0	0.00
Spain	1	1	0	0	1	0	+1	100.00
Switzerland	1	0	1	0	0	0	0	0.00
United States	2	1	1	0	5	1	+4	50.00
Uruguay	6	1	3	2	5	8	−3	16.67
Uzbekistan	1	1	0	0	3	1	+2	100.00
Venezuela	6	5	1	0	12	3	+9	83.33
Total	81	41	25	15	126	69	+57	50.62

Source: Results
