= Davinson Sánchez =

Colombian footballer (born 1996)

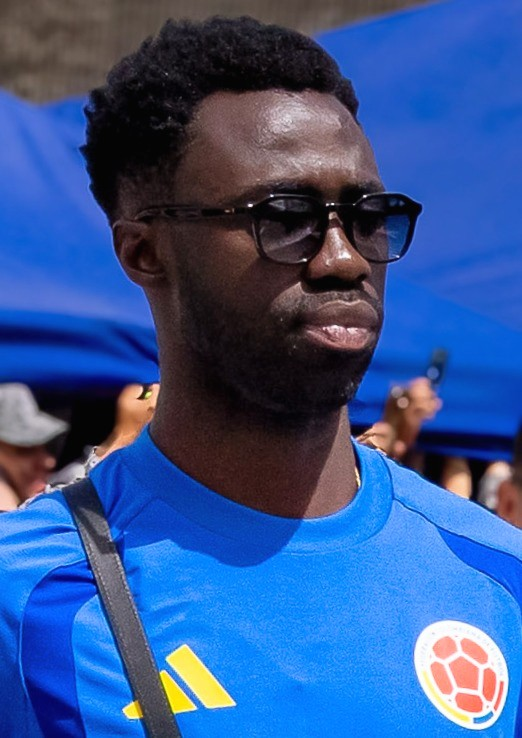
- Sánchez with Colombia in 2026

Personal information
- Full name: Davinson Sánchez Mina
- Date of birth: 12 June 1996 (age 30)
- Place of birth: Caloto, Cauca, Colombia
- Height: 1.88 m (6 ft 2 in)
- Position: Centre-back

Team information
- Current team: Galatasaray
- Number: 6

Youth career
- América de Cali
- 2012–2013: Atlético Nacional

Senior career*
| Years | Team | Apps | (Gls) |
| 2013–2016 | Atlético Nacional | 26 | (0) |
| 2016 | Ajax II | 1 | (0) |
| 2016–2017 | Ajax | 32 | (6) |
| 2017–2023 | Tottenham Hotspur | 143 | (3) |
| 2023– | Galatasaray | 90 | (7) |

International career^{‡}
| 2013 | Colombia U17 | 2 | (0) |
| 2014–2015 | Colombia U20 | 14 | (0) |
| 2016 | Colombia Olympic | 2 | (0) |
| 2016– | Colombia | 89 | (4) |
Medal record
Representing Colombia
Men's football
Copa América
| Runner-up | 2024 United States |
| Third place | 2021 Brazil |
- * Club domestic league appearances and goals as of 19 September 2026 ‡ National team caps and goals as of 6 October 2026

Davinson Sánchez Mina (born 12 June 1996) is a Colombian professional footballer who plays as a centre-back for Süper Lig club Galatasaray and captains the Colombia national team.

Sánchez came through the youth system of Atlético Nacional, with whom he won two Categoría Primera A titles and the 2016 Copa Libertadores. He moved to Europe with Ajax in 2016 and, in his only full season in the Netherlands, was named the club's Player of the Year and started the 2017 UEFA Europa League final. He joined Tottenham Hotspur in August 2017 for a then club-record fee, and made 207 appearances in six seasons, a period that included the club's run to the 2019 UEFA Champions League final. Since joining Galatasaray in 2023, he has won three consecutive Süper Lig titles, the 2024–25 Turkish Cup and the 2023 Turkish Super Cup.

At youth level, Sánchez captained Colombia at under-15 level and played at the 2015 FIFA U-20 World Cup. He made his senior international debut in 2016 and has since represented Colombia at the FIFA World Cup in 2018 and 2026, and at three editions of the Copa América, winning third place in 2021 and finishing as runner-up in 2024, when he was named in the Team of the Tournament. He was appointed Colombia captain in September 2026.

== Early life ==
Sánchez was born in Caloto, in the Cauca Department of south-western Colombia, and grew up in Ciénaga Honda, a rural hamlet in a region affected by the armed conflict with the FARC. His grandfather was among his first coaches, and he trained at the academy of América de Cali. His family moved to Cali to support his football, and from the age of about ten he travelled to training alone by bus because his father struggled to cover the cost of taking him.

Then a central midfielder, Sánchez was spotted in a recreational match in Cali by Juan Carlos Osorio, the head coach of Atlético Nacional, who told him he had the qualities to play as a centre-back. He joined Nacional's youth set-up in 2012, aged 16, where youth coach Felipe Merino moved him into central defence.

== Club career ==
=== Atlético Nacional ===
Osorio gave Sánchez his professional debut on 27 October 2013, in a Categoría Primera A match against Boyacá Chicó. He was a squad player in Nacional's title-winning campaigns in the 2013 Finalización and 2015 Finalización.

Sánchez became a regular starter in 2016 under Reinaldo Rueda, partnering Alexis Henríquez in central defence. On 1 March 2016, he scored his first senior goal with a 12th-minute header from a Daniel Bocanegra corner in a 3–0 Copa Libertadores group-stage win over Sporting Cristal at the Atanasio Girardot Stadium. He played every minute of Nacional's knockout run, and started both legs of the final against Independiente del Valle: a 1–1 draw in Quito on 20 July and a 1–0 win in Medellín a week later that gave Nacional their second Copa Libertadores title.

His performances attracted interest from Europe. Barcelona wanted to sign him for their reserve team, and FC Basel were also interested, but Sánchez turned down Barcelona because he did not want to play for their B team.

=== Ajax ===
In June 2016, Sánchez agreed a five-year contract with Ajax for a fee of about €5 million, joining the club after completing Nacional's Copa Libertadores campaign. He made his competitive debut on 13 August 2016, starting in a 2–2 home draw with Roda JC in the Eredivisie, and quickly established himself under manager Peter Bosz.

On 24 September 2016, Sánchez scored his first two Eredivisie goals, both headers from Hakim Ziyech corners, in a 5–1 win over PEC Zwolle. He added a header in a 2–0 win over FC Groningen in December, and on 5 April 2017 scored with a bicycle kick from a corner in a 4–1 win over AZ. Ajax finished the league one point behind champions Feyenoord, and reached the 2017 UEFA Europa League final, in which Sánchez started as Ajax lost 2–0 to Manchester United at the Friends Arena in Stockholm. He was named Ajax's Player of the Year for the 2016–17 season.

Sánchez began the 2017–18 season with Ajax and scored in the second leg of the Champions League third qualifying round against Nice on 2 August 2017, a 2–2 draw in which Ajax were eliminated on away goals. He was left out of the squad for the following matches as Tottenham Hotspur's interest intensified.

=== Tottenham Hotspur ===
==== 2017–18 season ====
On 18 August 2017, Tottenham Hotspur agreed a club-record deal with Ajax for Sánchez, with an initial fee of €40 million that could rise to €42 million, and he signed a six-year contract. He made his debut as a stoppage-time substitute in a 1–1 Premier League draw with Burnley at Wembley Stadium on 27 August, and made his first start in a 3–0 win at Everton on 9 September.

Under Mauricio Pochettino, Sánchez quickly became a first-team regular, displacing the injured Toby Alderweireld. He started the 3–1 Champions League group-stage win over Real Madrid at Wembley on 1 November 2017, which secured Tottenham's place in the knockout rounds, and later that month Pochettino praised his one-on-one defending against Pierre-Emerick Aubameyang and Cristiano Ronaldo. Sánchez made 41 appearances in all competitions in his first season as Tottenham finished third, and in May 2018 signed a contract extension until 2024.

==== 2018–19 season ====
Sánchez missed part of November 2018 with a hamstring injury sustained against PSV in the Champions League. On 10 February 2019, he scored his first goal for the club, a diving header from a Christian Eriksen cross in a 3–1 win over Leicester City. He featured throughout Tottenham's run to the 2019 UEFA Champions League final, in which he was an unused substitute in the 2–0 defeat to Liverpool in Madrid.

==== 2019–2021 ====
Sánchez remained a regular after José Mourinho replaced Pochettino in November 2019. On 10 February 2021, he scored twice, both from Son Heung-min corners, in a 5–4 extra-time defeat to Everton in the fifth round of the FA Cup.

==== 2021–22 season ====
Under Antonio Conte, Sánchez scored his first goal at the Tottenham Hotspur Stadium in a 3–0 win over Norwich City on 5 December 2021. On 1 January 2022, he headed in a Son free kick in the 96th minute to give Tottenham a 1–0 win at Watford; timed at 95:45, it was the latest winning goal Tottenham had scored in a Premier League match since Opta began recording exact goal times in 2006–07.

==== 2022–23 season ====
Sánchez captained Tottenham in a competitive match for the first time in a 3–0 FA Cup fourth-round win at Preston North End on 28 January 2023. His playing time declined during the season, and on 15 April 2023 he was booed by sections of the home crowd after coming on as a first-half substitute and being involved in two goals in a 3–2 defeat to Bournemouth; club captain Hugo Lloris said he had never seen such treatment of a player in his career.

=== Galatasaray ===
==== 2023–24 season ====
On 4 September 2023, after 207 appearances and five goals for Tottenham, Sánchez joined Turkish champions Galatasaray on a four-year contract with the option of a fifth, for a fee of €9.5 million payable in instalments over five seasons. He made his debut on 23 September in a 2–1 away win over Başakşehir, and on 3 October made his Champions League debut for the club in a 3–2 win over Manchester United at Old Trafford. Four days later, he scored his first goal for Galatasaray in a 2–0 win at Antalyaspor. Galatasaray won the 2023–24 Süper Lig with a record 102 points, clinching the title with a 3–1 win at Konyaspor on 26 May 2024.

==== 2024–25 season ====
In October 2024, Sánchez opened the scoring from a Gabriel Sara free kick in a derby win over Beşiktaş. He scored his first goal in European competition for Galatasaray on 21 January 2025, a header in a 3–3 Europa League draw with Dynamo Kyiv. On 14 May, he started the 2025 Turkish Cup final, a 3–0 win over Trabzonspor, and four days later started the 3–0 win over Kayserispor that secured a second consecutive league title and a domestic double.

==== 2025–26 season ====
On 15 August 2025, Sánchez extended his contract until the end of the 2028–29 season. He made his 100th appearance for the club in January 2026. On 17 February, he scored his first Champions League goal, a header in a 5–2 home win over Juventus in the first leg of the knockout phase play-offs. In the round of 16, he started the 1–0 first-leg win over Liverpool in Istanbul but was suspended for the return leg after being booked. On 9 May 2026, a 4–2 win over Antalyaspor secured Galatasaray's fourth consecutive league title and Sánchez's third.

== International career ==
=== Youth career ===
Sánchez captained Colombia at the 2011 South American U-15 Championship. He was part of the under-17 squad at the 2013 South American U-17 Championship in Argentina, and was named by coach Carlos Restrepo in the under-20 squads for the 2015 South American U-20 Championship and the 2015 FIFA U-20 World Cup in New Zealand. At the World Cup, he started the round-of-16 match in which Colombia were eliminated 1–0 by the United States.

In March 2016, Sánchez started both legs of the CONMEBOL–CONCACAF Olympic qualification play-off against the United States, a 1–1 draw in Barranquilla and a 2–1 win in Frisco that took Colombia to the Rio 2016 Olympic tournament. He was not released for the Olympics themselves.

=== Senior career ===
==== Debut and 2018 World Cup ====
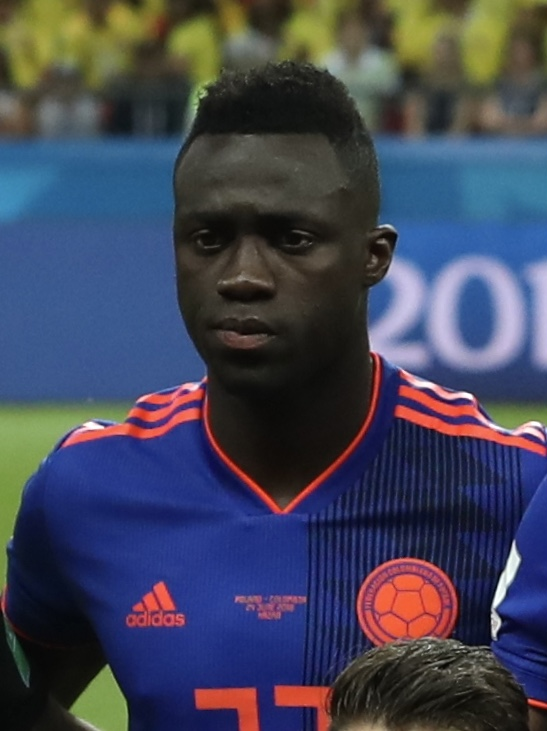
Sánchez at the 2018 FIFA World Cup

Sánchez made his senior debut under José Pékerman on 15 November 2016, starting alongside Jeison Murillo in a 3–0 World Cup qualifying defeat to Argentina in San Juan. He was named in Colombia's 23-man squad for the 2018 FIFA World Cup in Russia, and started all four of the team's matches, including the round-of-16 tie against England in Moscow, which Colombia lost 4–3 on penalties after a 1–1 draw.

==== Copa América, 2019–2021 ====
At the 2019 Copa América in Brazil, Sánchez started Colombia's opening 2–0 win over Argentina, and played in the quarter-final against Chile, which Colombia lost 5–4 on penalties after a goalless draw. Under Reinaldo Rueda at the 2021 Copa América, he started the quarter-final against Uruguay, and came on as a substitute in the 3–2 win over Peru in the third-place play-off.

==== First goals and 2024 Copa América ====
Sánchez scored his first international goal on 19 November 2022, from a Juan Fernando Quintero set piece in a 2–0 friendly win over Paraguay in Fort Lauderdale, one of Néstor Lorenzo's first matches as head coach.

At the 2024 Copa América in the United States, Sánchez started every match. On 28 June, he headed in a Jhon Arias corner in a 3–0 group-stage win over Costa Rica, and celebrated by holding up the shirt of the injured Jhon Lucumí. Colombia conceded two goals in their first five matches, and reached the final, which they lost 1–0 to Argentina after extra time at the Hard Rock Stadium. Sánchez was named in the tournament's Best XI.

==== 2026 World Cup and captaincy ====
On 15 October 2024, Sánchez opened the scoring in the 34th minute of a 4–0 World Cup qualifying win over Chile in Barranquilla. Colombia qualified for the 2026 FIFA World Cup with a 3–0 win over Bolivia on 4 September 2025. He was named in Lorenzo's 26-man squad for the World Cup on 25 May 2026. In the team's final warm-up match, on 1 June 2026, he scored the opening goal of a 3–1 win over Costa Rica at the Estadio El Campín.

He started all five of Colombia's matches. After wins over Uzbekistan (3–1) and DR Congo (1–0), he had a stoppage-time header disallowed for offside in a goalless draw with Portugal, as Colombia finished top of Group K. Colombia beat Ghana 1–0 in the round of 32, before being eliminated by Switzerland on penalties after a goalless draw at BC Place in Vancouver on 7 July, having conceded one goal in five matches. FIFA ranked him eighth in its defensive performance rankings for the tournament, the only Colombian in the top ten.

In September 2026, after James Rodríguez retired from international football, Lorenzo appointed Sánchez as Colombia's captain ahead of a series of friendlies.

== Style of play ==
A former central midfielder, Sánchez was converted to centre-back as a youth player at Atlético Nacional, a move intended to channel his aggression into defending. He is a physically strong, quick and aggressive defender who is strong in the air and comfortable on the ball; at Ajax, Peter Bosz described him as a "monster" without the ball, and he completed 89 per cent of his passes. Sánchez has named Franco Baresi and Sergio Ramos as the defenders he models his game on. Early in his career he was noted for a tendency to follow the ball and leave space behind him, while Pochettino praised his bravery in one-on-one situations, saying that he took risks without being reckless.

After a difficult final season at Tottenham, Sánchez's form recovered at Galatasaray, and by the 2024 Copa América he had returned to the level he showed at Ajax, becoming the leader of Colombia's defence. His leadership, anticipation, aerial strength and security in individual duels were highlighted during the 2026 World Cup.

== Personal life ==
Sánchez's family home is in Ciénaga Honda, now part of the municipality of Guachené. In 2016, he established the Fundación Dávinson Sánchez, a foundation for children in his home region, which is run by members of his family, with his mother, Esther Mina, as its president. He is known by the nickname "Dao".

== Career statistics ==
=== Club ===
As of match played 19 September 2026

Appearances and goals by club, season and competition
| Club | Season | League | | | National cup (Note: Includes Copa Colombia, FA Cup, Turkish Cup) | | League cup (Note: Includes EFL Cup) | | Continental | | Other | | Total | |
| Club | Season | Division | Apps | Goals | Apps | Goals | Apps | Goals | Apps | Goals | Apps | Goals | Apps | Goals |
|---|---|---|---|---|---|---|---|---|---|---|---|---|---|---|
| Atlético Nacional | 2013 | Categoría Primera A | 3 | 0 | 0 | 0 | — | | — | | — | | 3 | 0 |
| Atlético Nacional | 2014 | Categoría Primera A | 2 | 0 | 2 | 0 | — | | 0 | 0 | 0 | 0 | 4 | 0 |
| Atlético Nacional | 2015 | Categoría Primera A | 7 | 0 | 1 | 0 | — | | — | | 0 | 0 | 8 | 0 |
| Atlético Nacional | 2016 | Categoría Primera A | 14 | 0 | 0 | 0 | — | | 14 (Note: Appearances in Copa Libertadores) | 1 | 2 (Note: Appearances in Superliga Colombiana) | 0 | 30 | 1 |
| Atlético Nacional | Total | | 26 | 0 | 3 | 0 | — | | 14 | 1 | 2 | 0 | 45 | 1 |
| Jong Ajax | 2016–17 | Eerste Divisie | 1 | 0 | — | | — | | — | | — | | 1 | 0 |
| Ajax | 2016–17 | Eredivisie | 32 | 6 | 0 | 0 | — | | 12 (Note: Appearances in UEFA Europa League) | 0 | 0 | 0 | 44 | 6 |
| Ajax | 2017–18 | Eredivisie | 0 | 0 | — | | — | | 2 (Note: Appearances in UEFA Champions League) | 1 | — | | 2 | 1 |
| Ajax | Total | | 32 | 6 | 0 | 0 | — | | 14 | 1 | 0 | 0 | 46 | 7 |
| Tottenham Hotspur | 2017–18 | Premier League | 31 | 0 | 2 | 0 | 0 | 0 | 8 | 0 | — | | 41 | 0 |
| Tottenham Hotspur | 2018–19 | Premier League | 23 | 1 | 2 | 0 | 4 | 0 | 8 | 0 | — | | 37 | 1 |
| Tottenham Hotspur | 2019–20 | Premier League | 29 | 0 | 4 | 0 | 1 | 0 | 5 | 0 | — | | 39 | 0 |
| Tottenham Hotspur | 2020–21 | Premier League | 18 | 0 | 2 | 2 | 2 | 0 | 10 | 0 | — | | 32 | 2 |
| Tottenham Hotspur | 2021–22 | Premier League | 23 | 2 | 1 | 0 | 5 | 0 | 3 (Note: Appearances in UEFA Conference League) | 0 | — | | 32 | 2 |
| Tottenham Hotspur | 2022–23 | Premier League | 18 | 0 | 3 | 0 | 1 | 0 | 2 | 0 | — | | 24 | 0 |
| Tottenham Hotspur | 2023–24 | Premier League | 1 | 0 | — | | 1 | 0 | — | | — | | 2 | 0 |
| Tottenham Hotspur | Total | | 143 | 3 | 14 | 2 | 14 | 0 | 36 | 0 | — | | 207 | 5 |
| Galatasaray | 2023–24 | Süper Lig | 23 | 2 | 3 | 1 | — | | 6 (Note: Four appearances in UEFA Champions League, two appearances in UEFA Europa League) | 0 | 0 | 0 | 32 | 3 |
| Galatasaray | 2024–25 | Süper Lig | 31 | 3 | 4 | 1 | — | | 9 | 1 | 0 | 0 | 44 | 5 |
| Galatasaray | 2025–26 | Süper Lig | 30 | 1 | 2 | 0 | — | | 11 | 1 | 2 (Note: Appearances in Turkish Super Cup) | 0 | 45 | 2 |
| Galatasaray | 2026–27 | Süper Lig | 10 | 1 | 0 | 0 | — | | 4 | 0 | — | | 14 | 1 |
| Galatasaray | Total | | 94 | 7 | 9 | 2 | — | | 31 | 2 | 2 | 0 | 135 | 11 |
| Career total | | | 296 | 16 | 26 | 4 | 14 | 0 | 95 | 4 | 4 | 0 | 434 | 24 |

=== International ===
As of match played 6 October 2026

Appearances and goals by national team and year
| National team | Year | Apps | Goals |
|---|---|---|---|
| Colombia | 2016 | 1 | 0 |
| Colombia | 2017 | 6 | 0 |
| Colombia | 2018 | 10 | 0 |
| Colombia | 2019 | 12 | 0 |
| Colombia | 2020 | 3 | 0 |
| Colombia | 2021 | 13 | 0 |
| Colombia | 2022 | 6 | 1 |
| Colombia | 2023 | 7 | 0 |
| Colombia | 2024 | 10 | 2 |
| Colombia | 2025 | 7 | 0 |
| Colombia | 2026 | 14 | 1 |
| Total | | 89 | 4 |

Scores and results list Colombia's goal tally first, score column indicates score after each Sánchez goal.

List of international goals scored by Davinson Sánchez
| No. | Date | Venue | Opponent | Score | Result | Competition |
|---|---|---|---|---|---|---|
| 1 | 19 November 2022 | DRV PNK Stadium, Fort Lauderdale, United States | Paraguay | 1–0 | 2–0 | Friendly |
| 2 | 28 June 2024 | State Farm Stadium, Glendale, United States | Costa Rica | 2–0 | 3–0 | 2024 Copa América |
| 3 | 15 October 2024 | Estadio Metropolitano Roberto Meléndez, Barranquilla, Colombia | Chile | 1–0 | 4–0 | 2026 FIFA World Cup qualification |
| 4 | 1 June 2026 | Estadio El Campín, Bogotá, Colombia | Costa Rica | 1–0 | 3–1 | Friendly |

== Honours ==
Atlético Nacional

- Categoría Primera A: 2013 Finalización, 2015 Finalización
- Superliga Colombiana: 2016
- Copa Libertadores: 2016

Ajax

- UEFA Europa League runner-up: 2016–17

Tottenham Hotspur

- UEFA Champions League runner-up: 2018–19

Galatasaray

- Süper Lig: 2023–24, 2024–25, 2025–26
- Turkish Cup: 2024–25
- Turkish Super Cup: 2023

Colombia

- Copa América runner-up: 2024; third place: 2021

Individual

- Ajax Player of the Year: 2016–17
- Eredivisie Team of the Season: 2016–17
- Copa América Team of the Tournament: 2024
- Süper Lig Team of the Season: 2024–25
