= Delio Gamboa =

Colombian footballer (1936–2018)

Delio "Maravilla" Gamboa
Personal information
- Full name: Delio Gamboa Rentería
- Date of birth: 28 January 1936
- Place of birth: Buenaventura, Colombia
- Date of death: 23 August 2018 (aged 82)
- Position: Striker

International career
Years	Team	Apps	(Gls)
1957–1966	Colombia	24	(7)

Delio "Maravilla" Gamboa Rentería (28 January 1936 – 23 August 2018) was a Colombian football player. Gamboa's career ran from 1955 to 1974 in which time he played for Atlético Nacional, Millonarios, Independiente Santa Fe, Once Caldas, and Deportes Tolima, "Maravilla" translates directly to "wonder".

== Early football career ==
Born in Buenaventura (Valle del Cauca), Colombia, Delio Gamboa signed with Atlético Nacional in 1958, after getting noticed playing in an "aficionado" national league. A year later, Gamboa was transferred to a football club named CD Oro based out of Mexico. He was considered to be their most important player for two straight seasons. He led Oro to be runners-up of the Mexican Domestic league in his first season with the club.

== International career ==
Delio took part in the 1961 Colombia National Squad which qualified for the following years FIFA World Cup. At the 1962 FIFA World Cup an injury limited Gamboa to just one appearance at said World Cup.

== "Maravilla" ==
Upon his arrival in Colombia to play in the 1961 qualifiers Delio joined Millonarios. He went on to play for Millonarios from 1961 to 1965. He won the Colombian Domestic League (now the Liga Águila) title four straight seasons (1961, 1962, 1963 and 1964). Delio had been given his nickname "Maravilla" when still an amateur, as number 10 (inside-left was the position called then) on the Valle del Cauca selección, which outclassed all other State teams and garnered the Colombian championship, stunning the spectators with his play which people thought nothing short of miraculous and Gamboa "a wonder" in the flesh. He briefly revived the nickname which Millonarios sides earned in the DiStefano-Pedernera era, "El Ballet Azul" ("The Blue Ballet") for its elegant and artistic style of play.

=== Copa Libertadores with "Millos" ===
In the 1962 Edition Gamboa and "Los Embajadores" translating to "The Ambassadors" saw an early first round exit. In 1963 they were matched up with continental football giants of that era in Garrincha's Botafogo and Alianza de Lima from Peru. They faced no better fortunes as they again were eliminated. Despite being eliminated early Gamboa and "Millos" would come back and win the Domestic crown the following year. Though they had no title to show, Millonarios led by Gamboa represented Colombia in the Copa Libertadores for four straight years and were thus nicknamed "Los Embajadores".

== Stint at Santa Fe ==
Although then came the injuries, at the end of the 1965 campaign Gamboa was sold to Independiente Santa Fe. Nonetheless "Maravilla" went on to win the Domestic title with Santa Fe in 1966. Gamboa scored 33 goals in 76 matches for Santa Fe between 1966 and 1968.

== Later years ==
After the titles, "wonderful play" and the rash of injuries he spent the 1968–1970 seasons at Once Caldas and then transferred to Deportes Tolima for the 1971 and 1972 campaigns. Gamboa's career would see one more team change, returning to the Millonarios, in 1973 and ended his professional playing career in 1974. He later went on to be Head Coach for Deportes Tolima and then left to become the Director of Millonarios' youth system.
