= 2015 Atlético Nacional season =

Atlético Nacional
2015 season
- Chairman: Juan Carlos de La Cuesta
- Manager: Reinaldo Rueda
- Stadium: Atanasio Girardot
- Categoría Primera A: Apertura: Quarterfinals; Finalización: Champions
- Copa Colombia: Eighth-finals
- Superliga Colombiana: Runners-up
- Copa Libertadores: Eighth-finals
- Top goalscorer: League: Jefferson Duque (16 goals each); All: Jefferson Duque (16 goals each)
- Average home league attendance: 25,282 (A) 31,456 (C)
Home colours	Away colours	Third colours

The 2015 Atlético Nacional season was the 68th season in the club's history. The team competed in the Categoría Primera A, Copa Colombia, Superliga Colombiana and Copa Libertadores.

== Players ==
=== First-team squad ===
As of 16 October 2016

Note: Flags indicate national team as defined under FIFA eligibility rules; some limited exceptions apply. Players may hold more than one non-FIFA nationality.

No.	Pos.	Nation	Player
1	GK	COL	Camilo Vargas
2	DF	COL	Daniel Bocanegra
3	DF	COL	Óscar Murillo
4	DF	COL	Brayan Rovira
5	DF	COL	Francisco Nájera
6	DF	COL	Juan David Valencia
7	FW	COL	Andrés Escobar
8	MF	COL	Diego Arias
9	FW	COL	Jefferson Duque
10	MF	COL	Macnelly Torres
11	FW	PAR	Pablo Velázquez
12	DF	COL	Alexis Henríquez
13	MF	COL	Alexander Mejía
14	MF	COL	Jairo Palomino
16	FW	COL	Jonathan Copete
17	FW	COL	Yulian Mejía

No.	Pos.	Nation	Player
18	MF	VEN	Alejandro Guerra (on loan from Mineros de Guayana)
19	DF	COL	Farid Díaz
20	MF	COL	Alejandro Bernal
21	FW	COL	Yimmi Chará
22	DF	COL	Gilberto García
23	DF	COL	Diego Peralta
24	MF	COL	Sebastián Pérez
25	GK	COL	Christian Vargas
26	DF	COL	Davison Sánchez
27	FW	COL	Luis Carlos Ruiz
28	FW	COL	Orlando Berrío
29	FW	COL	Marlos Moreno
30	DF	COL	Miller Mosquera
34	GK	ARG	Franco Armani
35	GK	COL	Luis Enrique Martínez

== Pre-season and friendlies ==
Match won	Match drawn	Match lost

17 January Copa Clásicos Miami	San Lorenzo (Argentina)	2–0	(Colombia) Atlético Nacional	Miami, United States
17:00				Stadium: FIU Stadium

21 January Mascota	Atlético Nacional (Colombia)	3–0	(Colombia) Barranquilla	Guarne
				Stadium: Complejo Deportivo

21 January Mascota	Atlético Nacional (Colombia)	3–1	(Colombia) Barranquilla	Guarne
				Stadium: Complejo Deportivo

28 June Mascota	Atlético Nacional (Colombia)	3–2	(Paraguay) Club Guaraní	Guarne
				Stadium: Complejo Deportivo

28 June Mascota	Atlético Nacional (Colombia)	1–2	(Paraguay) Club Guaraní	Guarne
				Stadium: Complejo Deportivo

4 July Friendly	Atlético Nacional (Colombia)	3–1	(Argentina) Vélez Sarsfield	Guarne, Colombia
20:00				Stadium: Guarne stadium

=== Superliga Colombiana ===
Match won	Match drawn	Match lost

24 January Home	Atlético Nacional	2–1	Deportivo Cali	Medellín
		Report		Stadium: Estadio Atanasio Girardot; Attendance: 25.072; Referee: Wilson Lamouroux

27 January Away	Santa Fe	2–0	Atlético Nacional	Bogotá
20:00				Stadium: Estadio El Campín; Referee: Nicolás Gallo

=== Categoría Primera A ===
==== Torneo Finalización ====
12 July 1	Águilas Doradas	0–2	Atlético Nacional	Medellín
15:30				Stadium: Estadio Atanasio Girardot; Referee: Luis Fernando Trujillo

18 July 2	Atlético Nacional	0–0	Independiente Medellín	Medellín
18:00				Stadium: Estadio Atanasio Girardot; Attendance: 37.575; Referee: Jorge Guzmán

25 July 3	Atlético Huila	0–2	Atlético Nacional	Armenia
18:00				Stadium: Estadio Centenario; Attendance: 10.000; Referee: Harold Perilla

2 August 4	Atlético Nacional	1–0	Envigado	Medellín
17:00				Stadium: Estadio Atanasio Girardot; Attendance: 30.645; Referee: Juan Carlos Gamarra

5 August 5	Atlético Nacional	4–0	Deportivo Pasto	Medellín
17:00				Stadium: Estadio Atanasio Girardot; Attendance: 25.061; Referee: Andrés Rojas

19 August 7	Universidad Autónoma	1–1	Atlético Nacional	Barranquilla
18:00				Stadium: Estadio Metropolitano; Attendance: 2,227; Referee: Cristian Villarraga

23 August 8	Atlético Nacional	1–2	Atlético Nacional	Medellín
18:00				Stadium: Estadio Atanasio Girardot; Attendance: 32.728; Referee: Luis Sánchez

20 August 9	Atlético Nacional	2–0	La Equidad	Medellín
19:45				Stadium: Estadio Atanasio Girardot; Attendance: 35,692; Referee: Juan Pontón

5 September 10	Independiente Medellín	1–0	Atlético Nacional	Medellín
18:00				Stadium: Estadio Atanasio Girardot; Attendance: 35.416; Referee: Wilson Lamouroux

10 September 11	Atlético Nacional	3–0	Deportivo Cali	Bucaramanga
20:00	Pérez 43'; N. Palacios 55'		Rodríguez 32'; Ibargüen 40'	Stadium: Estadio Alfonso López; Referee: Luis Sánchez

17 September 13	Envigado	0–0	Atlético Nacional	Envigado
19:45		Report		Stadium: Estadio Polideportivo Sur; Referee: Ulises Arrieta

24 September 14	Atlético Nacional	1–1	Cortuluá	Medellín
17:00	Rodríguez 71'	Report	García 66' (o.g.)	Stadium: Estadio Atanasio Girardot; Attendance: 19,893; Referee: Juan Carlos Gamarra

30 September 15	La Equidad	1–3	Atlético Nacional	Bogotá
20:00	Blanco 30'	Report	Borja 3'; Bocanegra 44', 63'	Stadium: Estadio Metropolitano de Techo; Attendance: 5,180; Referee: Hervin Otero

8 October 3^{†}	Rionegro Águilas	1–1	Atlético Nacional	Rionegro
19:30	Amaya 16'	Report	Rodríguez 8'	Stadium: Estadio Alberto Grisales; Attendance: 9,500; Referee: Harold Perilla

17 October 16	Atlético Nacional	4–0	Atlético Huila	Medellín
19:45	Dajome 10', 59'; Blanco 69'; Quiñones 85'	Report		Stadium: Estadio Atanasio Girardot; Attendance: 18,319; Referee: Éder Vergara

22 October 17	Independiente Medellín	2–2	Atlético Nacional	Medellín
20:00	Caicedo 33'; Marrugo 90+1' (pen.)	Report	Rescaldani 50' (pen.); Nieto 60'	Stadium: Estadio Atanasio Girardot; Attendance: 34,349; Referee: Wilmar Roldán

30 October 18	Atlético Nacional	2–1	Patriotas	Medellín
17:00	Moya 10'; Dajome 70'	Report	Rendón 39'	Stadium: Estadio Atanasio Girardot; Attendance: 37,345; Referee: Ulises Arrieta

6 November 19	Santa Fe	0–0	Atlético Nacional	Bogotá
16:30		Report		Stadium: Estadio El Campín; Attendance: 6,000; Referee: Wilson Lamouroux

9 November 12^{†}	Atlético Nacional	2–2	Junior	Medellín
19:00	Uribe 55'; Henríquez 86'	Report	Rangel 13'; Vélez 15'	Stadium: Estadio Atanasio Girardot; Referee: Carlos Herrera

19 November 20	Atlético Nacional	3–1	Deportivo Pasto	Itagüí
17:45	Rodríguez 32' (pen.), 87' (pen.); Ramírez 50'	Report	Arango 35'	Stadium: Estadio Metropolitano Ciudad de Itagüí; Referee: Edilson Ariza

†: Matches postponed due to participation in the Copa Libertadores and Copa Sudamericana.

Knockout phase
