= Néstor Lorenzo =

Argentine football manager (born 1966)

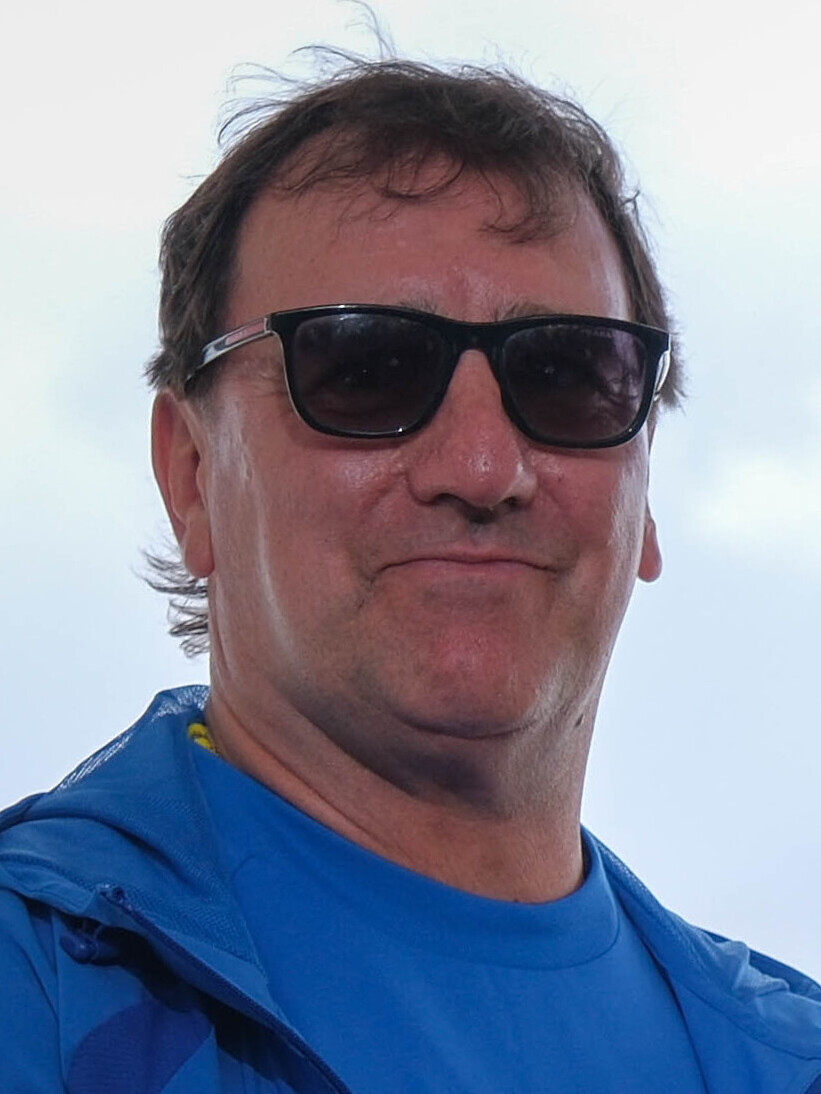
- Lorenzo in 2026

Personal information
- Full name: Néstor Gabriel Lorenzo
- Date of birth: 26 February 1966 (age 60)
- Place of birth: Villa Celina, Buenos Aires, Argentina
- Height: 1.85 m (6 ft 1 in)
- Position: Defender

Team information
- Current team: Colombia (head coach)

Youth career
- Argentinos Juniors

Senior career*
Years	Team	Apps	(Gls)
1985–1989	Argentinos Juniors	68	(1)
1989–1990	Bari	23	(1)
1990–1992	Swindon Town	24	(2)
1992–1994	San Lorenzo	63	(3)
1994–1995	Banfield	25	(1)
1995–1996	Ferro Carril Oeste	29	(4)
1996–1997	Boca Juniors	14	(0)
1997–1998	Quilmes		
Total		246	(12)

International career
1988	Argentina U23	4	(0)
1988–1990	Argentina	13	(0)

Managerial career
- 2000–2001: Argentina U20 (assistant)
- 2003–2004: Leganés (assistant)
- 2004–2006: Argentina (assistant)
- 2007–2008: Toluca (assistant)
- 2009: Tigres UANL (assistant)
- 2012–2019: Colombia (assistant)
- 2021–2022: Melgar
- 2022–: Colombia
Medal record
Men's football
Representing Argentina (as player)
FIFA World Cup
Runner-up	1990 Italy
Representing Colombia (as manager)
Copa América
Runner-up	2024 United States
- * Club domestic league appearances and goals

Néstor Gabriel Lorenzo (born 26 February 1966) is an Argentine football manager and former player who played as a defender. He is the current head coach of the Colombia national team.

Lorenzo played for Argentinos Juniors, A.S. Bari, Swindon Town, Club Atlético San Lorenzo de Almagro, Ferrocarril Oeste and Boca Juniors. Lorenzo also represented Argentina in the 1990 FIFA World Cup in Italy, including the final which the Argentines lost to Germany.

== Club career ==
Born in Villa Celina, La Matanza, Buenos Aires Province, Lorenzo was a product of Argentinos Juniors' youth categories. After making his first team debut in 1985, he spent four seasons at the club before moving to Italian side Bari in 1989.

After Italia '90 and after an attempt by Brian Clough to sign Lorenzo for Nottingham Forest fell through, Argentine legend Ossie Ardiles signed the defender for Swindon Town on loan and eventually the deal became a permanent switch. He played 27 times for The Robins, scoring two goals: one in his debut at the County Ground against Portsmouth in a 3–0 win, and one away at Watford in a 2–2 draw.

After seeing out his contract, Lorenzo returned to Argentina and signed for San Lorenzo in 1992. After two seasons as a starter, he had one-year spells at Banfield, Ferro Carril Oeste, Boca Juniors and Primera B Nacional side Quilmes, retiring with the latter in 1998.

== International career ==
Before featuring in the 1988 Summer Olympics with the Olympic team, Lorenzo made his international debut with the Argentina national team on 6 July 1988, in a 2–2 friendly against Saudi Arabia. He was included in Carlos Bilardo's 23-man squad for the 1990 FIFA World Cup, featuring in two matches in the group stage before starting in the final against West Germany.

== Managerial career ==
=== Assistant coach ===
After retiring, Lorenzo joined José Pékerman's staff in the Argentina national under-20 team in 2000, as an assistant coach. He worked with Carlos Aimar at Spanish side CD Leganés under the same role, before reuniting with Pékerman in the Argentina national team in 2004.

Lorenzo remained working with Pékerman at Toluca, Tigres UANL and the Colombia national team.

=== Melgar ===
On 16 December 2020, Lorenzo had his first managerial experience after being named at the helm of Peruvian Primera División side FBC Melgar. After a poor start in the Fase 1, as the club finished in the last position of their group, they finished fourth in the Fase 2 and qualified to the 2022 Copa Sudamericana.

Under Lorenzo's guidance, Melgar won the 2022 Apertura tournament in July. He left after qualifying the club to the quarterfinals of the Copa Sudamericana.

=== Colombia national team ===
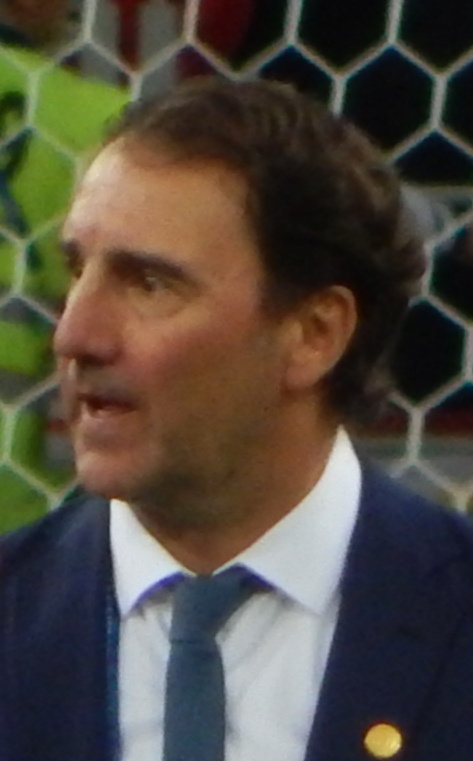
Lorenzo during the 2018 FIFA World Cup

Having previously been with Colombia as an assistant coach, the Colombian Football Federation announced Lorenzo as head coach of the national team on 2 June 2022 for the following four years; he remained in charge of Melgar until July. On 20 June 2023, Colombia beat the Germany national team for the first time in its history, securing a dominant 2–0 victory away from home under Lorenzo.

Between 2022 and 2024, Colombia went a record 28 matches undefeated while under Lorenzo, including significant victories against Germany, Brazil, Uruguay and Spain. This run also saw Lorenzo lead the national team to the 2024 Copa América final, their first final in 23 years, with Colombia having scored their highest-ever tally of twelve goals across the competition; however, they would lose the final after extra time to Argentina, ending their unbeaten run. Lorenzo then guided Colombia to qualification for the 2026 FIFA World Cup in September 2025, finishing third in the CONMEBOL standings and reaching the World Cup for a seventh time. Following the tournament, in which Colombia reached the round of 16 and only conceded one goal, Lorenzo was given a contract extension of an undisclosed length by the Colombian Football Federation on 23 July 2026.

== Career statistics ==
=== England ===
Season	Team	League Apps	League Goals	F.A. Cup Apps	F.A. Cup Goals
1991–92	Swindon Town	2 (+2)	0	0	0
1990–91	Swindon Town	18 (+2)	2	3	0

== Managerial statistics ==
As of match played 17 November 2026

Managerial record by team and tenure
Team	Nat.	From	To	Record					Ref.
Team	Nat.	From	To	G	W	D	L	Win %	Ref.
Melgar	(Peru)	1 January 2021	8 July 2022	63	35	12	16	55.56	
Colombia	(Colombia)	9 July 2022	Present	56	33	15	8	58.93	
Career Total				119	68	27	24	57.14	

== Honours ==
=== Player ===
Argentinos Juniors

- Copa Interamericana: 1985

AS Bari

- Mitropa Cup: 1990

Argentina

- FIFA World Cup runner-up: 1990

=== Manager ===
FBC Melgar

- Torneo Apertura: 2022

Colombia

- Copa América runner-up: 2024
