= 2012 Categoría Primera B season =

Torneo Postobón
- Season: 2012
- Champions: Apertura: América de Cali; Finalización: Alianza Petrolera; Season: Alianza Petrolera
- Promoted: Alianza Petrolera
- Relegated: None
- Top goalscorer: Apertura: Jefferson Duque (20 goals); Finalización: Andrés Rentería (15 goals)
- Highest attendance: 35,000 América

The 2012 Categoría Primera B season is the 23rd season since its founding and is officially called the 2012 Torneo Postobón for sponsorship reasons.

== Format ==
The season will consist of two tournaments: the 'Torneo Apertura' and the 'Torneo Finalización'. Each tournament will have an identical format of eighteen rounds with a round of regional derbies in the ninth round. At the end of the first eighteen rounds, the eight best-placed team will advance to the Semifinal round where teams will be sorted into groups and play a short double Round-robin tournament group stage. The winner of each group will advance to the Final round, which will consist of two legs. The winner will advance to the season final at the end of the Torneo Finalización.

== Current teams ==
Departament	Home city	Club	Head Coach	Stadium
Cundinamarca	Bogotá	Academia	Jaime Rodríguez Suárez	Estadio Compensar
Cundinamarca	Bogotá	Bogotá F.C.	Oswaldo Duran Renteria	Estadio Alfonso López Pumarejo
Cundinamarca	Zipaquirá	Fortaleza	Jaime Manjarrés	Estadio Municipal Los Zipas
Cundinamarca	Soacha	Expreso Rojo	Rafallo Curanto	Estadio Luis Carlos Galán Sarmiento
Valle del Cauca	Cali	América	Eduardo Lara	Estadio Pascual Guerrero
Valle del Cauca	Cali	Depor F.C.	Jorge Bermúdez	Estadio Pascual Guerrero
Valle del Cauca	Tuluá	Cortuluá	Fernando Velasco Gutiérrez	Estadio Doce de Octubre
Santander	Bucaramanga	Atlético Bucaramanga	Álvaro de Jesús Goméz	Estadio Alfonso Lopez
Santander	Bucaramanga	Real Santander	Eduardo Villamizar	Estadio Alfonso Lopez
Santander	Barrancabermeja	Alianza Petrolera	Hector Dario Estrada	Estadio Daniel Villa Zapata
Atlántico	Barranquilla	Barranquilla F.C.	David Jose Pinillos	Estadio Romelio Martínez
Atlántico	Sabanalarga	Uniautónoma F.C.	Félix Valverde Quiñónez	Estadio Marcos Henríquez
Risaralda	Pereira	Deportivo Pereira	Octavio Zambrano	Estadio Hernán Ramírez Villegas
Antioquia	Rionegro	Deportivo Rionegro	Oscar Aristizabal	Estadio Alberto Grisales
Sucre	Sincelejo	Sucre F.C.	Osnar Acuña	Estadio Arturo Cumplido Sierra
Magdalena	Santa Marta	Unión Magdalena	Carlos Silva Socarrás	Estadio Eduardo Santos
Cauca	Popayán	Universitario Popayán	César Torres	Estadio Ciro López
Cesar	Valledupar	Valledupar F.C.	Jesús Alberto Barrios	Estadio Armando Maestre Pavajeau
Meta	Villavicencio	Llaneros F.C.	Alberto Rujana	Estadio Manuel Calle Lombana

Only participated in Torneo Apertura.
Replace Academia FC for Torneo Finalización.

== Torneo Apertura ==
=== First stage ===
==== Standings ====
Pos	Team	Pld	W	D	L	GF	GA	GD	Pts	Qualification
1	América	18	12	2	4	33	15	+18	38	Advance to the Semifinals
2	Cortuluá	18	9	6	3	24	14	+10	33	Advance to the Semifinals
3	Rionegro	18	9	5	4	33	19	+14	32	Advance to the Semifinals
4	Sucre	18	8	7	3	22	18	+4	31	Advance to the Semifinals
5	Uniautónoma	18	8	6	4	27	19	+8	30	Advance to the Semifinals
6	Universitario de Popayán	18	9	3	6	25	18	+7	30	Advance to the Semifinals
7	Unión Magdalena	18	8	4	6	27	21	+6	28	Advance to the Semifinals
8	Real Santander	18	8	3	7	25	23	+2	27	Advance to the Semifinals
9	Fortaleza	18	7	5	6	25	26	−1	26	
10	Valledupar	18	6	6	6	26	28	−2	24	
11	Deportivo Pereira	18	6	5	7	21	23	−2	23	
12	Bogotá	18	5	5	8	24	34	−10	20	
13	Academia	18	4	7	7	22	22	0	19	
14	Depor	18	5	3	10	23	34	−11	18	
15	Alianza Petrolera	18	3	8	7	19	27	−8	17	
16	Atlético Bucaramanga	18	4	5	9	18	27	−9	17	
17	Barranquilla	18	4	4	10	18	28	−10	16	
18	Expreso Rojo	18	3	4	11	8	24	−16	13	

Rules for classification: 1st points; 2nd goal difference; 3rd goals scored; 4th away goals scored; 5th away goals against; 6th draw.

==== Results ====
Home \ Away	ACA	AP	AME	BAR	BUC	BOG	COR	DEP	PER	EXP	FOR	RSA	RIO	SUC	MAG	UPO	UAU	VAL
Academia			2–3		2–0	1–1	1–0		2–2			2–3	1–1		2–1			3–0
Alianza Petrolera	0–0			0–0	2–4	2–0	0–2				2–2			1–1		1–2	1–1	
América		2–0		1–0		2–1		4–0	3–0	1–0		1–0			3–0	2–0		
Barranquilla	2–1				2–1	3–0	1–0				1–1			0–2		0–3	0–2	2–2
Atlético Bucaramanga			1–3					2–1	2–2	0–0		1–1	2–1		1–0	0–2		2–2
Bogotá	3–2				2–1		1–3				2–1		3–3	1–1		3–0	1–1	1–1
Cortuluá			0–0		2–0			4–2	1–0			1–1	1–1		1–1	0–1		2–1
Depor	2–1	2–4	0–1	3–2		2–1				2–0	2–1			2–3			1–1	
Deportivo Pereira		4–0		2–1		0–3		2–0		0–0	0–0		2–0	1–2			3–2	
Expreso Rojo	0–0	2–1		2–1		1–0	1–2				0–1			0–1		0–0	1–2	
Fortaleza	2–1		1–1		1–0		2–2			3–0			2–4	2–1			2–1	3–2
Real Santander		2–0		1–0	1–0	4–1		1–1	1–2	3–0	2–1				3–1			
Rionegro		1–1	2–1	3–0				1–0	3–0	2–0		4–0			1–0	3–1		
Sucre	1–1	0–2	3–2		1–1		0–0					2–0	1–0				1–1	2–1
Unión Magdalena		1–1		2–1		6–0		1–0	1–0	2–1	3–0			0–0				3–1
Universitario de Popayán	0–0						1–2	2–0	1–1		2–0	2–1		3–0	3–1		0–1	
Uniautónoma	1–0		3–2	2–2	2–0		0–1					1–0	1–1		3–4			3–0
Valledupar		1–1	2–1					2–2	1–0	3–0		3–1	3–2		0–0	1–0		

Updated to match(es) played on March 24, 2012. Source:
Legend: Blue = home team win; Yellow = draw; Red = away team win.

=== Semifinals ===
The Semifinal stage began on May 30 and ended on June 23. The eight teams that advanced were sorted into two groups of four teams. The winner of each group advanced to the finals.

==== Group A ====
Pos	Team	Pld	W	D	L	GF	GA	GD	Pts	Qualification	AME	RIO	UPO	RSA
1	América	6	4	2	0	14	6	+8	14	Advanced to the Finals		1–1	4–0	5–3
2	Deportivo Rionegro	6	2	3	1	11	8	+3	9		0–0		3–0	5–2
3	Universitario de Popayán	6	2	0	4	7	9	−2	6		0–1	3–0		4–0
4	Real Santander	6	1	1	4	10	19	−9	4		2–3	2–2	1–0	

Rules for classification: 1st points; 2nd first stage position.

==== Group B ====
Pos	Team	Pld	W	D	L	GF	GA	GD	Pts	Qualification	MAG	UAU	SUC	COR
1	Unión Magdalena	6	3	2	1	9	5	+4	11	Advanced to the Finals		2–1	1–0	4–1
2	Uniautónoma	6	2	2	2	7	7	0	8		1–1		0–1	1–0
3	Sucre	6	2	1	3	5	6	−1	7		1–0	1–2		0–0
4	Cortuluá	6	1	3	2	7	10	−3	6		1–1	2–2	3–2	

Rules for classification: 1st points; 2nd first stage position.

=== Finals ===
Pos	Team	Pld	W	D	L	GF	GA	GD	Pts	Qualification
1	América	2	0	2	0	2	2	0	2	Advance to Final of the year
2	Unión Magdalena	2	0	2	0	2	2	0	2	

June 27, 2012
20:00

Unión Magdalena	1–1	América de Cali
Mosquera 60'	Report	Trujillo 12'

Estadio Eduardo Santos, Magdalena
Referee: Wilmar Roldán

July 3, 2012
20:00

América de Cali	1–1	Unión Magdalena
Arango 57'	Report	Silvera 74'
Penalties
Schenone (penalty scored); Romero (penalty missed); Viáfara (penalty scored); Mendoza (penalty scored); Arango (penalty scored); Lalinde (penalty scored)	5–4	(penalty scored) Domeneghini; (penalty scored) Carrillo; (penalty missed) Cortés; (penalty scored) Silvera; (penalty scored) Arnedo; (penalty missed) Fula

Estadio Olímpico Pascual Guerrero, Cali
Referee: Adrián Vélez

Torneo Postobón
2012 Apertura champion

1st title

=== Top goalscorers ===
Rank	Player	Nationality	Club	Goals
1	Jefferson Duque	Colombian	Deportivo Rionegro	20
2	Sergio Romero	Colombian	Real Santander	12
2	Paulo César Arango	Colombian	América de Cali	11
4	Luis Ríos	Colombian	Real Santander	10
5	Yuberney Franco	Colombian	Uniautónoma	10

== Torneo Finalización ==
=== First stage ===
==== Standings ====
Pos	Team	Pld	W	D	L	GF	GA	GD	Pts	Qualification
1	Deportivo Pereira	18	13	4	1	37	14	+23	43	Advance to the Semifinals
2	Alianza Petrolera	18	10	4	4	35	18	+17	34	Advance to the Semifinals
3	América	18	10	4	4	31	18	+13	34	Advance to the Semifinals
4	Rionegro	18	9	4	5	25	19	+6	31	Advance to the Semifinals
5	Universitario de Popayán	18	9	3	6	20	21	−1	30	Advance to the Semifinals
6	Cortuluá	18	8	5	5	27	25	+2	29	Advance to the Semifinals
7	Uniautónoma	18	6	9	3	23	20	+3	27	Advance to the Semifinals
8	Atlético Bucaramanga	18	8	3	7	22	24	−2	27	Advance to the Semifinals
9	Valledupar	18	6	7	5	15	12	+3	25	
10	Sucre	18	7	4	7	19	22	−3	25	
11	Bogotá	18	7	2	9	22	30	−8	23	
12	Unión Magdalena	18	6	3	9	19	20	−1	21	
13	Depor	18	4	7	7	22	25	−3	19	
14	Fortaleza	18	5	4	9	14	18	−4	19	
15	Expreso Rojo	18	4	4	10	12	18	−6	16	
16	Real Santander	18	4	4	10	22	31	−9	16	
17	Barranquilla	18	4	3	11	22	37	−15	15	
18	Llaneros	18	3	4	11	11	26	−15	13	

Rules for classification: 1st points; 2nd goal difference; 3rd goals scored; 4th away goals scored; 5th away goals against; 6th draw.

==== Results ====
Home \ Away	LLA	AP	AME	BAR	BUC	BOG	COR	DEP	PER	EXP	FOR	RSA	RIO	SUC	MAG	UPO	UAU	VAL
Llaneros		0–3		1–2		2–3		0–0		1–0	1–0			0–0		1–1	1–2	
Alianza Petrolera			1–1					3–2	1–1	0–1		2–1	0–0	3–0	1–2			2–0
América	3–1				1–0		3–3	1–2			3–1		2–0	4–0			1–1	1–1
Barranquilla		3–3	0–1					0–3	1–2	1–0		2–1	2–4		3–2		1–3	
Atlético Bucaramanga	3–0	1–2		1–1		2–1	3–2				1–0	3–1		0–2			2–0	
Bogotá	1–1	2–5	2–1	2–1				0–3	1–2	1–1		1–0			3–2			0–1
Cortuluá	1–0	1–0		3–1		3–1				3–0	3–1			1–0		1–0	1–1	
Depor			1–3		1–2		2–2		1–0			1–4	1–1		1–1	0–2		0–0
Deportivo Pereira	4–0		3–2		3–0		4–1					4–2	1–0		2–1	4–1		2–0
Expreso Rojo			1–2		0–0			1–1	0–1		1–0	4–0	1–2		0–0			1–0
Fortaleza		0–3		3–1		0–2		1–1	0–0	2–0		2–0			1–0	3–0		
Real Santander	0–2		0–1		1–1		2–1						2–0	3–3		2–0	1–1	1–1
Deportivo Rionegro	1–0				1–2	1–0	3–0		1–1		1–0			2–1			3–3	1–0
Sucre		1–2		2–1		2–0		2–1	0–1	2–1	0–0				1–0	3–1		
Unión Magdalena	1–0		0–1		3–0		1–1					1–2	2–1			1–2	1–0	0–1
Universitario de Popayán		1–0	1–0	2–1	1–0	1–0	3–0			1–0			1–3					1–1
Uniautónoma		1–4		0–0		3–1		2–1	2–2	1–0	0–0			2–0		1–1		
Valledupar	1–0			4–1	4–1		0–0				1–0			0–0	1–0		0–0	

Updated to match(es) played on December 2, 2012. Source:
Legend: Blue = home team win; Yellow = draw; Red = away team win.

=== Semifinals ===
The Semifinal stage began on October 20 and ended on November 18. The eight teams that advanced were sorted into two groups of four teams. The winner of each group advanced to the finals.

==== Group A ====
Pos	Team	Pld	W	D	L	GF	GA	GD	Pts	Qualification	RIO	UAU	PER	COR
1	Deportivo Rionegro	6	3	0	3	8	8	0	9	Advanced to the Finals		2–1	3–1	1–0
2	Uniautónoma	6	3	0	3	11	11	0	9		2–1		3–0	2–1
3	Deportivo Pereira	6	2	2	2	7	8	−1	8		2–0	3–1		1–1
4	Cortuluá	6	2	2	2	8	7	+1	8		2–1	4–2	0–0	

Rules for classification: 1st points; 2nd first stage position.

==== Group B ====
Pos	Team	Pld	W	D	L	GF	GA	GD	Pts	Qualification	AP	AME	UPO	BUC
1	Alianza Petrolera	6	5	0	1	15	6	+9	15	Advanced to the Finals		3–0	2–1	2–0
2	América	6	3	0	3	6	10	−4	9		1–4		2–1	2–1
3	Universitario de Popayán	6	3	0	3	9	11	−2	9		4–3	1–0		1–0
4	Bucaramanga	6	1	0	5	5	8	−3	3		0–1	0–1	4–1	

Rules for classification: 1st points; 2nd first stage position.

=== Finals ===
Pos	Team	Pld	W	D	L	GF	GA	GD	Pts	Qualification
1	Alianza Petrolera	2	2	0	0	4	1	+3	6	Advance to Final of the year
2	Deportivo Rionegro	2	0	0	2	1	4	−3	0	

November 22, 2012
19:45

Deportivo Rionegro	0–1	Alianza Petrolera
	Report	Nieto 45+'

Estadio Alberto Grisales, Rionegro
Referee: Juan Pontón

November 25, 2012
19:45

Alianza Petrolera	3–1	Deportivo Rionegro
Rentería 16' 62'; Palomeque 32'	Report	Arrieta 84' (pen.)

Estadio Polideportivo Sur, Envigado
Referee: Óscar Gutiérrez

Torneo Postobón
2012 Finalización champion

1st title

=== Top goalscorers ===
Rank	Player	Nationality	Club	Goals
1	Andrés Rentería	Colombian	Alianza Petrolera	15
2	Carlos Rodas	Colombian	Cortuluá	12
2	Alexander Mosquera	Colombian	América de Cali	10
4	Luis Ríos	Colombian	Real Santander	10
5	Harry Castillo	Colombian	Uniautónoma	9

== Final of the year ==
Pos	Team	Pld	W	D	L	GF	GA	GD	Pts	Promotion
1	Alianza Petrolera	2	1	0	1	2	2	0	3	Promotion to Categoría Primera A
2	América	2	1	0	1	2	2	0	3	

November 28, 2012
15:15

Alianza Petrolera	2–1	América de Cali
Rangel 53'; Palomeque 72'	Report	Cuesta 86'

Estadio Polideportivo Sur, Envigado
Referee: Hernando Buitrago

December 1, 2012
15:15

América de Cali	1–0	Alianza Petrolera
Mendoza 7'	Report
Penalties
Bustos (penalty missed); Trujillo (penalty scored); Schenone (penalty scored); Mendoza (penalty missed); Lalinde (penalty scored)	3–4	(penalty scored) Nieto; (penalty scored) Carrascal; (penalty scored) Palomeque; (penalty missed) Rentería; (penalty scored) Arango

Estadio Olímpico Pascual Guerrero, Cali
Referee: Wilson Lamouroux

Torneo Postobón
2012 champion

1st title

== Promotion/relegation playoff ==
As the second worst team in the relegation table, Cúcuta Deportivo had to play a two-legged tie against América de Cali, the 2012 Categoría Primera B runner-up. As the Primera A team, Cúcuta will play the second leg at home. The winner will be determined by points, followed by goal difference, then a penalty shootout. The winner will be promoted/remain in the Primera A for the 2013 season, while the loser will be relegated/remain in the Primera B.

Pos	Team	Pld	W	D	L	GF	GA	GD	Pts	Qualification
1	Cúcuta Deportivo	2	1	0	1	5	3	+2	3	Remains in the Categoría Primera A
2	América	2	1	0	1	3	5	−2	3	

December 7, 2012
15:30

America de Cali	1–4	Cucuta Deportivo
Bustos 50'	Report	Uribe 4'; Bueno 48'; Lozano 56'; Flórez 89'

Estadio Olímpico Pascual Guerrero, Cali
Referee: Wilmar Roldán
December 12, 2012
19:45

Cucuta Deportivo	1–2	America de Cali
Uribe 39'	Report	Hurtado 78', 85'

Estadio General Santander, Cúcuta
Referee: Adrián Vélez

== Aggregate table ==
Pos	Team	Pld	W	D	L	GF	GA	GD	Pts	Promotion or qualification
1	América	52	30	10	12	89	52	+37	100	Promotion/relegation playoff (Note: América is qualified as the Apertura champion.)
2	Rionegro	50	23	12	15	80	58	+22	81	
3	Cortuluá	48	20	16	12	66	46	+20	76	
4	Alianza Petrolera (C, P)	46	21	12	13	75	54	+21	75	Promotion to 2013 Categoría Primera A
5	Universitario de Popayán	48	23	6	19	61	59	+2	75	
6	Deportivo Pereira	42	21	11	10	65	45	+20	74	
7	Uniautónoma	48	19	17	12	68	57	+11	74	
8	Sucre	42	17	12	13	46	46	0	63	
9	Unión Magdalena	44	17	11	16	57	48	+9	62	
10	Valledupar	36	12	13	11	41	40	+1	49	
11	Real Santander	42	13	8	21	57	73	−16	47	
12	Atlético Bucaramanga	42	13	8	21	44	60	−16	47	
13	Fortaleza	36	12	9	15	39	44	−5	45	
14	Bogotá	36	12	7	17	46	64	−18	43	
15	Depor	36	9	10	17	45	59	−14	37	
16	Llaneros	36	7	11	18	33	50	−17	32	
17	Barranquilla	36	8	7	21	40	65	−25	31	
18	Expreso Rojo	36	7	8	21	20	42	−22	29	

Rules for classification: 1) points; 2) goal difference; 3) number of goals scored.
(C) Champions; (P) Promoted
