= Cristian Correa (footballer, born 1985) =

Colombian footballer

Personal information
- Full name: Cristian Camilo Correa Valenzuela
- Date of birth: 27 August 1985 (age 41)
- Place of birth: Chigorodó, Colombia
- Height: 1.75 m (5 ft 9 in)
- Position: Midfielder

Senior career*
Years	Team	Apps	(Gls)
2004–2012	Atlético Nacional	48	(0)
2006	→ Alianza Petrolera (loan)	16	(2)
2007–2008	→ Atlético Bello (loan)	9	(0)
2010	→ Atlético La Sabana (loan)	15	(2)
2011–2012	→ Valledupar (loan)	20	(0)
2012–2013	Atlético Bucaramanga	31	(0)
2014–2015	Deportivo Pereira	11	(1)
2015	Unión Magdalena	7	(1)
- * Club domestic league appearances and goals as of 13:44, 13 December 2018 (UTC)

Cristian Camilo Correa Valenzuela (born 27 August 1985) is a Colombian footballer who plays as a midfielder. He is currently a free agent.

== Career ==
Correa's career got underway in 2004 with Atlético Nacional. He remained with the Categoría Primera A club for eight years, making a total of forty-eight appearances. During his time with Atlético Nacional, the midfielder was loaned out on four occasions. 2006 saw Correa play for Alianza Petrolera, which preceded a two-year stint with Atlético Bello and a subsequent spell with Atlético La Sabana in 2010 - a total of forty appearances and four goals arrived for Correa with those teams. On 30 June 2011, Valledupar of Categoría Primera B signed Correa on loan. He remained for both the 2011 and 2012 seasons.

Correa left Atlético Nacional permanently in June 2012, as he agreed to sign for second tier Atlético Bucaramanga. He made his debut for them on 30 July 2012 against Deportivo Pereira, which was the first of forty-one fixtures he was selected in by the club across two campaigns. Correa joined Deportivo Pereira ahead of the 2014 Categoría Primera B season. He scored his first goal for them in his final appearance, netting during a win over América de Cali on 23 March 2015. Three months later, Correa moved to Unión Magdalena. Eight games and one goal, also against América de Cali, followed in 2015.

== Career statistics ==
As of 13 December 2018.

Club statistics
Club	Season	League			Cup (Note: Includes the Copa Colombia)		League Cup		Continental		Other		Total	
Club	Season	Division	Apps	Goals	Apps	Goals	Apps	Goals	Apps	Goals	Apps	Goals	Apps	Goals
Atlético Nacional	2009	Categoría Primera A	18	0	0	0	—		—		0	0	18	0
Atlético Nacional	2010	Categoría Primera A	12	0	0	0	—		—		0	0	12	0
Atlético Nacional	Total		30	0	0	0	—		—		0	0	30	0
Alianza Petrolera (loan)	2006	Categoría Primera B	16	2	0	0	—		—		0	0	16	2
Atlético La Sabana (loan)	2010	Categoría Primera B	15	2	0	0	—		—		0	0	15	2
Valledupar (loan)	2011	Categoría Primera B	7	0	4	1	—		—		0	0	11	1
Valledupar (loan)	2012	Categoría Primera B	13	0	5	0	—		—		0	0	18	0
Valledupar (loan)	Total		20	0	9	1	—		—		0	0	29	1
Atlético Bucaramanga	2012	Categoría Primera B	15	0	4	1	—		—		0	0	19	1
Atlético Bucaramanga	2013	Categoría Primera B	16	0	6	0	—		—		0	0	22	0
Atlético Bucaramanga	Total		31	0	10	1	—		—		0	0	41	1
Deportivo Pereira	2014	Categoría Primera B	8	0	3	1	—		—		2 (Note: Two appearances in the 2014 Categoría Primera B play-offs)	0	13	1
Deportivo Pereira	2015	Categoría Primera B	3	1	5	0	—		—		1 (Note: One appearance in the 2015 Categoría Primera B play-offs)	0	9	1
Deportivo Pereira	Total		11	1	8	1	—		—		3	0	22	2
Unión Magdalena	2015	Categoría Primera B	7	1	0	0	—		—		1 (Note: One appearance in the 2015 Categoría Primera B play-offs)	0	8	1
Career total			130	6	27	3	—		—		4	0	161	9
