= Cristian Palomeque =

Colombian footballer (born 1994)

Personal information
- Full name: Cristian Andres Palomeque Valoyes
- Date of birth: April 2, 1994 (age 32)
- Place of birth: Carepa, Colombia
- Height: 1.70 m (5 ft 7 in)
- Position: Left winger

Team information
- Current team: Juticalpa

Youth career
- 2012: Atlético Nacional

Senior career*
Years	Team	Apps	(Gls)
2012–2018	Atlético Nacional	0	(0)
2012–2013	→ Alianza Petrolera (loan)	45	(11)
2014	→ Once Caldas (loan)	17	(2)
2015	→ San Antonio Scorpions (loan)	1	(0)
2015	→ Jaguares de Córdoba (loan)	11	(2)
2016	→ Colón (loan)	3	(0)
2017	→ Real Cartagena (loan)	5	(0)
2018	Alianza Petrolera	17	(2)
2019	La Equidad	14	(0)
2020	Alianza Petrolera	12	(2)
2021	Mushuc Runa	21	(1)
2023–	Juticalpa	0	(0)

International career
2011	Colombia U17	5	(1)
2013	Colombia U20	14	(1)
2015	Colombia Olympic	1	(0)
- * Club domestic league appearances and goals as of 1 June 2019

Cristian Andres Palomeque Valoyes (born 2 April 1994) is a Colombian footballer who plays for Honduran Liga Nacional de Ascenso club Juticalpa F.C.

== Club career ==
=== Alianza Petrolera ===
==== 2012 ====
Palomeque joined Alianza Petrolera on loan from Atlético Nacional, and made his debut on 20 October as a starter, scoring a goal in a 2–1 victory against Universitario Popayán for the 2012 Categoría Primera B. He made his second season appearance against América de Cali, netting a double in a 4–1 triumph at the Pascual Guerrero just nine days later. On 4 November, he scored against Atlético Bucaramanga in a 1–0 victory. Palomeque would score against Bucaramanga once more, this time in a 2–0 home win. In a decisive match against Deportivo Rionegro, Palomeque scored the second goal in a 3–1 victory, thus allowing Petrolera to dispute the promotion play-off against América de Cali.

Despite having only played a handful of games, Palomeque's goal scoring abilities became an important factor for Petrolera as they reached their most important moment in history. In the first leg of the final, Palomeque netted what would be his most vital goal yet, helping Petrolera top América 2–1. Him along with his team, failed to find the net in the second leg, with América eventually tying up the series at 2-2. However, he still managed to score in the penalty shoot-out which Petrolera remarkably won 4–3, therefore being promoted.

==== 2013 ====
After taking part in the Colombian team that won the 2013 South American Youth Championship, Palomeque made his first appearance in the Categoría Primera A against Atlético Nacional. On 20 April, Palomeque scored his first top division goal from a free kick in a 2–2 draw against Deportivo Cali. He successfully converted a goal from the penalty spot on 12 May against Cúcuta Deportivo. Petrolera, however, lost the match 2–3. Against Atlético Huila, Palomeque scored the sole goal in a 1–0 victory.

==== Once Caldas ====
On 24 January 2014, Palomeque joined Once Caldas on loan from Atlético Nacional. He scored his first goal for the club in the 93rd minute in a 1–1 draw against Boyacá Chicó. His only other goal with Once Caldas was also scored against Boyacá Chicó in a 4–1 victory at the Estadio Palogrande.

==== San Antonio Scorpions ====
On 18 February 2015, he joined NASL club San Antonio Scorpions on loan. He scored the first goal in a preseason friendly against MLS side FC Dallas, that resulted in a 2–1 victory for his club.

==== Jaguares de Cordoba ====
After a short unsuccessful spell in the United States, Palomeque joined Jaguares de Córdoba for the second half of the 2015 Torneo Finalización. During his tenure at Jaguares, he only scored 2 goals in a 4–3 defeat against La Equidad.

==== Colón ====
On 7 January 2016, he joined Argentine Primera División club Colón on loan from Atlético Nacional.

==== Real Cartagena ====
Palomeque joined Real Cartagena on loan, on 6 January 2017.

=== Later career ===
In late 2017, Palomeque joined Alianza Petrolera for the upcoming season. On December 10, 2018, Palomeque joined La Equidad. In January 2020, Alianza Petrolera announced his return for a third spell.

On 14 January 2021, Palomeque joined Ecuadorian Serie A club Mushuc Runa. After a year without a club, on 5 February 2023, he joined Honduran Second Division club Juticalpa. His team reached the promotion final against Génesis and lost it in a penalty shootout 10–9, after a 2–2 draw. Palomeque hit the crossbar on his first attempt and had his second attempt saved by the keeper.

== Career statistics ==
=== Club ===
As of 8 November 2023

Appearances and goals by club, season and competition
Club	Season	League			National Cup		Continental		Total	
Club	Season	Division	Apps	Goals	Apps	Goals	Apps	Goals	Apps	Goals
Alianza Petrolera (loan)	2012	Categoría Primera B	17	7			—		17	7
Alianza Petrolera (loan)	2013	Categoría Primera A	28	4	11	1	—		39	5
Alianza Petrolera (loan)	Total		45	11	11	1	0	0	56	12
Once Caldas (loan)	2014	Categoría Primera A	17	2	7	1	—		24	3
San Antonio Scorpions (loan)	2015	North American Soccer League	1	0	0	0	—		1	0
Jaguares de Córdoba (loan)	2015	Categoría Primera A	11	2	0	0	—		11	2
Colón (loan)	2016	Argentine Primera División	3	0	0	0	—		3	0
Real Cartagena (loan)	2017	Categoría Primera B	5	0	3	0	—		8	0
Alianza Petrolera	2018	Categoría Primera A	17	2	1	0	—		18	2
La Equidad	2019	Categoría Primera A	14	0	2	0	3 (Note: Appearances in Copa Sudamericana)	0	19	0
Alianza Petrolera	2020	Categoría Primera A	12	2	1	0	—		13	2
Mushuc Runa	2021	Ecuadorian Serie A	21	1	0	0	—		21	1
Juticalpa (Note: No statistics available for the Honduran Second Division)	2023	Honduran Second Division	–	–	–	–	–	–	–	–
Career total			146	20	25	2	3	0	174	22

== Honours ==
=== Club ===
Alianza Petrolera

- Categoría Primera B: 2012

=== Colombia ===
- South American Youth Championship: 2013
