= 2014 Categoría Primera B season =

Torneo Postobón
- Season: 2014
- Champions: Apertura: Jaguares; Finalización: Quindío; Season: Jaguares
- Promoted: Jaguares
- Relegated: None
- Top goalscorer: Apertura: Harold Preciado (15 goals); Finalización: Erwin Carrillo (19 goals)

The 2014 Categoría Primera B season is the 25th season since its founding and is officially called the 2014 Torneo Postobón for sponsorship reasons.

== Format ==
The season consisted of two tournaments: the 'Torneo Apertura' and the 'Torneo Finalización'. The Apertura tournament will be divided into three stages. The First Stage will be contested on a home-and-away basis, with each team playing the other teams once and playing a regional rival once more. The top eight teams after eighteen rounds will advance to a knockout round, where they will be pitted into four ties to be played on a home-and-away basis, with the four winners advancing to the semifinals and the winner of each semifinal advancing to the final of the tournament, which will be played on a home-and-away basis as well. The winner of this final qualifies for the season final. Meanwhile, the Finalizacion tournament will have a format of eighteen rounds with a round of regional derbies in the ninth round. At the end of the first eighteen rounds, the eight best-placed team will advance to the Semifinal round where teams will be sorted into groups and play a short double Round-robin tournament group stage. The winner of each group will advance to the Final round, which will consist of two legs. The winner will also advance to the season final at the end of the Torneo Finalización, with its winner being promoted to the Categoría Primera A.

== Current teams ==
Locations of the 2014 Primera B teams

Club	Home city	Stadium	Head coach
América	Cali	Pascual Guerrero	Jhon Jairo López
Atlético Bucaramanga	Bucaramanga	Alfonso López	Bernardo Redín
Barranquilla F.C.	Barranquilla	Romelio Martínez	Arturo Reyes
Bogotá F.C.	Bogotá	Metropolitano de Techo	Germán Morales
Cortuluá	Tuluá	Doce de Octubre	Néstor Rodríguez
Cúcuta Deportivo	Cúcuta	General Santander	Héctor Estrada
Depor F.C.	Cali	Pascual Guerrero	Victor Sicachá
Deportes Quindío	Armenia	Centenario	Miguel Augusto Prince
Deportivo Pereira	Pereira	Hernán Ramirez Villegas	Jesús Alberto Barrios
Deportivo Rionegro	Bello	Tulio Ospina	(Colombia) Álvaro Hernández
Expreso Rojo	Girardot	Luis Antonio Duque Peña	Jhon Jairo Bodmer
Jaguares	Montería	Municipal de Montería	José Alberto Suárez
Llaneros F.C.	Villavicencio	Manuel Calle Lombana	Hubert Bodhert
Real Cartagena	Cartagena	Jaime Morón León	José Domínguez
Real Santander	Floridablanca	Álvaro Gómez Hurtado	Victor Hugo González
Unión Magdalena	Santa Marta	Municipal de Ciénaga	Fernando Velasco
Universitario	Popayán	Ciro López	César Torres
Valledupar F.C.	Valledupar	Armando Maestre Pavajeau	Hugo Arrieta

== Torneo Apertura ==
=== First stage ===
==== Standings ====
Pos	Team	Pld	W	D	L	GF	GA	GD	Pts	Qualification
1	Atlético Bucaramanga	18	10	4	4	22	12	+10	34	Advance to the Semifinals
2	Llaneros	18	9	6	3	23	15	+8	33	Advance to the Semifinals
3	América	18	9	5	4	24	15	+9	32	Advance to the Semifinals
4	Jaguares	18	9	4	5	26	20	+6	31	Advance to the Semifinals
5	Quindío	18	8	6	4	23	13	+10	30	Advance to the Semifinals
6	Cúcuta Deportivo	18	9	3	6	20	18	+2	30	Advance to the Semifinals
7	Rionegro	18	9	2	7	30	25	+5	29	Advance to the Semifinals
8	Unión Magdalena	18	8	4	6	21	22	−1	28	Advance to the Semifinals
9	Valledupar	18	8	3	7	29	18	+11	27	
10	Real Cartagena	18	7	6	5	24	17	+7	27	
11	Universitario de Popayán	18	8	2	8	25	25	0	26	
12	Barranquilla	18	5	7	6	18	22	−4	22	
13	Real Santander	18	6	4	8	21	28	−7	22	
14	Cortuluá	18	4	7	7	21	26	−5	19	
15	Bogotá	18	4	5	9	15	27	−12	17	
16	Expreso Rojo	18	3	5	10	17	28	−11	14	
17	Deportivo Pereira	18	3	4	11	18	33	−15	13	
18	Depor	18	3	3	12	17	30	−13	12	

Rules for classification: 1st points; 2nd goal difference; 3rd goals scored; 4th away goals scored; 5th away goals against; 6th draw.

==== Results ====
Home \ Away	AME	BAR	BOG	BUC	COR	CUC	DEP	QUI	PER	EXP	JAG	LLA	RCA	RSA	RIO	MAG	UPO	VAL
América		1–1	5–0	0–0			2–1		1–0	3–1		1–1	1–0				2–1	
Barranquilla				1–2		1–2		2–0	2–1		0–2			4–1	1–0	1–1		1–1
Bogotá		0–0		0–1			1–1		1–2	1–0		0–0	1–0			4–2	0–1	
Atlético Bucaramanga						0–1	4–0	1–0		2–0	0–1	1–0		0–0			1–0	3–1
Cortuluá	1–2	1–1	1–3	1–2			3–1			2–1		1–2	1–1				1–1	
Cúcuta Deportivo	0–1	1–0	2–2		0–1			1–0		1–1				2–0	2–1			1–0
Depor	0–0	1–1				3–0		0–2	3–5		1–2	2–0	2–0			0–1		
Quindío	3–1		5–2		1–1				1–1	1–0				0–0	1–0		3–1	1–0
Deportivo Pereira				1–1	0–1	1–1		0–3			1–1			4–2	0–1	1–2		1–6
Expreso Rojo		0–1					1–0		1–0		0–2	3–3	1–1		3–3	0–1	3–2	
Jaguares	2–1		2–0		0–0	2–0		1–1					2–2	0–1	4–2			2–1
Llaneros		1–1	0–0			1–0		1–0	2–0		3–2		2–2			3–0		1–0
Real Cartagena		4–0		2–0		1–3		0–0	1–0		3–0			3–1		0–0		1–0
Real Santander	0–1		2–0	1–1	3–3		2–0			2–0		0–1			2–0		3–1	
Rionegro	1–1		2–0	3–2	2–1		2–1			2–1		1–2	2–1				5–0	
Unión Magdalena	1–0			0–1	1–1	3–1		1–1			2–1			3–1	0–2			1–0
Universitario de Popayán		3–0			3–0	0–2	2–1		3–0		2–0	1–0	1–2			2–1		
Valledupar	2–1		1–0		2–1		2–0			1–1				5–0	3–1	3–1	1–1	

Updated to match(es) played on May 11, 2014. Source:
Legend: Blue = home team win; Yellow = draw; Red = away team win.

=== Knockout round bracket ===
Quarterfinals
2	Llaneros	2	1	3
6	Cúcuta Deportivo	0	1	1
3	América	1	3	4
5	Quindío	1	1	2
1	Atlético Bucaramanga (p)	1	2	3 (5)
8	Unión Magdalena	2	1	3 (4)
4	Jaguares	1	2	3
7	Rionegro	2	0	2

Semifinals
2	Llaneros	0	2	2
3	América	4	2	6
1	Atlético Bucaramanga	0	3	3 (5)
4	Jaguares (p)	3	0	3 (6)

Finals
3	América	1	1	2
4	Jaguares	4	1	5

=== Quarterfinals ===
Team 1	Agg.	Team 2	1st leg	2nd leg
Cúcuta Deportivo	1–3	Llaneros	0–2	1–1
Quindío	2–4	América	1–1	1–3
Unión Magdalena	3–3 (4–5 p)	Atlético Bucaramanga	2–1	1–2
Rionegro	2–3	Jaguares	2–1	0–2

=== Semifinals ===
Team 1	Agg.	Team 2	1st leg	2nd leg
América	6–2	Llaneros	4–0	2–2
Jaguares	3–3 (6–5 p)	Atlético Bucaramanga	3–0	0–3

=== Finals ===
June 4, 2014
15:00 UTC−05:00

Jaguares	4 – 1	América
Gómez 23'; Preciado 55', 90+1'; Salazar 73'	Report	Balanta 89'

Estadio Municipal de Montería, Montería
Referee: Ulises Arrieta

June 8, 2014
19:00 UTC−05:00

América	1 – 1	Jaguares
Brazalez 82'	Report	Preciado 61' (pen.)

Estadio Pascual Guerrero, Cali
Referee: Andrés Rojas

Torneo Postobón
2014 Apertura champion

=== Top goalscorers ===
Rank	Name	Club	Goals
1	(Colombia) Harold Preciado	Jaguares	15
2	(Colombia) Raúl Peñaranda	Valledupar	13
3	(Colombia) Feiver Mercado	Universitario de Popayán	11
3	(Colombia) Yamilson Rivera	América	11
5	(Colombia) Erwin Carrillo	Unión Magdalena	10

Source: Torneo Postobón

== Torneo Finalización ==
=== First stage ===
==== Standings ====
Pos	Team	Pld	W	D	L	GF	GA	GD	Pts	Qualification
1	Jaguares	18	10	4	4	27	18	+9	34	Advance to the Semifinals
2	Deportivo Pereira	18	9	6	3	28	15	+13	33	Advance to the Semifinals
3	Quindío	18	9	6	3	28	17	+11	33	Advance to the Semifinals
4	Rionegro	18	9	6	3	26	15	+11	33	Advance to the Semifinals
5	Unión Magdalena	18	9	5	4	32	20	+12	32	Advance to the Semifinals
6	Cúcuta Deportivo	18	9	5	4	21	15	+6	32	Advance to the Semifinals
7	Atlético Bucaramanga	18	8	7	3	23	19	+4	31	Advance to the Semifinals
8	América	18	8	6	4	25	17	+8	30	Advance to the Semifinals
9	Real Cartagena	18	9	3	6	20	18	+2	30	
10	Cortuluá	18	8	1	9	21	19	+2	25	
11	Valledupar	18	7	4	7	16	18	−2	25	
12	Llaneros	18	6	4	8	25	25	0	22	
13	Universitario de Popayán	18	5	4	9	17	29	−12	19	
14	Real Santander	18	4	6	8	17	24	−7	18	
15	Expreso Rojo	18	3	4	11	11	20	−9	13	
16	Depor	18	3	4	11	18	35	−17	13	
17	Bogotá	18	2	5	11	17	29	−12	11	
18	Barranquilla	18	3	2	13	11	30	−19	11	

Rules for classification: 1st points; 2nd goal difference; 3rd goals scored; 4th away goals scored; 5th away goals against; 6th draw.

==== Results ====
Home \ Away	AME	BAR	BOG	BUC	COR	CUC	DEP	QUI	PER	EXP	JAG	LLA	RCA	RSA	RIO	MAG	UPO	VAL
América					1–0	2–1	3–0	0–0			3–1			1–1	2–2	0–2		2–0
Barranquilla	0–1		2–1		4–2	0–1	0–1			2–1		1–1	0–1				0–1	
Bogotá	1–2				0–0	0–1		3–3			1–0	1–1		3–4	0–1			0–1
Atlético Bucaramanga	1–1	3–1	1–1		2–1				1–1				3–2	1–0	0–0	2–1		
Cortuluá						3–1		0–1	0–2		0–1			2–0	0–1	1–0	2–0	2–0
Cúcuta Deportivo		0–0		0–0			5–0		0–1		1–0	2–2	1–0			2–1	2–1	
Depor	1–1		1–3	0–1	0–2					1–2				2–1	0–0		2–2	3–2
Quindío		3–1		2–2		3–0	1–0		2–0		1–2	2–1	2–0			1–1		
Deportivo Pereira	1–1	2–0	2–0				3–2	0–1		1–0		3–2	0–0				5–0	
Expreso Rojo	2–1		0–0	1–2	1–0	0–0		0–1						1–1	0–1			0–0
Jaguares		3–0		1–1			1–0		1–1	2–1		3–2	2–0			3–2	1–1	
Llaneros	1–0		4–1	2–0	2–3		3–2			2–1				0–0	1–2		1–0	
Real Cartagena	3–1		2–1		2–1		1–1			1–0	3–2	2–0			1–0		1–0	
Real Santander		1–0		1–2		1–1		3–2	0–2		0–1		0–0			1–1		2–1
Rionegro		3–0				1–2		1–1	3–2	2–0	1–1			3–1		1–2		2–2
Unión Magdalena		4–0	3–1				4–2		1–1	1–0		1–0	2–1				3–3	0–0
Universitario de Popayán	0–3 (Note: DIMAYOR awarded a 3–0 away win in favor of América de Cali for Universitario de Popayán fielding an unauthorized player. Original result was a 2–1 win for Universitario de Popayán.)		1–0	2–1	1–2			2–2		2–1				1–0	0–2			0–1
Valledupar		1–0		2–0		0–1		1–0	1–1		0–2	1–0	2–0			1–3		

Updated to match(es) played on October 26, 2014. Source:
Legend: Blue = home team win; Yellow = draw; Red = away team win.

=== Semifinals ===
The Semifinal stage began on November 2 and will end on November 26. The eight teams that advanced were sorted into two groups of four teams. The winner of each group will advance to the finals.

==== Group A ====
Pos	Team	Pld	W	D	L	GF	GA	GD	Pts	Qualification	QUI	CUC	BUC	JAG
1	Quindío	6	3	1	2	7	3	+4	10	Advanced to the Finals		1–0	3–0	2–0
2	Cúcuta Deportivo	6	3	1	2	7	7	0	10		1–1		1–0	3–2
3	Atlético Bucaramanga	6	3	0	3	6	6	0	9		1–0	1–2		1–0
4	Jaguares	6	2	0	4	5	9	−4	6		1–0	2–0	0–3	

Rules for classification: 1st points; 2nd first stage position.

==== Group B ====
Pos	Team	Pld	W	D	L	GF	GA	GD	Pts	Qualification	RIO	PER	MAG	AME
1	Rionegro	6	3	1	2	9	10	−1	10	Advanced to the Finals		2–1	1–3	1–1
2	Deportivo Pereira	6	2	3	1	10	6	+4	9		3–1		1–1	1–1
3	Unión Magdalena	6	1	3	2	8	8	0	6		1–2	1–1		2–2
4	América	6	1	3	2	6	9	−3	6		1–2	0–3	1–0	

Rules for classification: 1st points; 2nd first stage position.

=== Finals ===
December 1, 2014
19:45 UTC−05:00

Rionegro	1 – 0	Quindío
Suescún 85'	Report

Estadio Tulio Ospina, Bello
Referee: Carlos Betancur

December 4, 2014
19:30 UTC−05:00

Quindío	4 – 1	Rionegro
Arquez 2'; Carpintero 19'; Filigrana 53'; Quiñones 88'	Report	Moya 4'

Estadio Centenario, Armenia
Referee: Gustavo Murillo

Torneo Postobón
2014 Finalización champion

=== Top goalscorers ===
Rank	Name	Club	Goals
1	(Colombia) Erwin Carrillo	Unión Magdalena	19
2	(Colombia) Leonardo Castro	Deportivo Pereira	12
3	(Colombia) Feiver Mercado	Universitario de Popayán	11
3	(Colombia) Tommy Tobar	Atlético Bucaramanga	11
5	(Colombia) Yilmar Filigrana	Quindío	10

Source: Torneo Postobón

== Final ==
December 9, 2014
19:30 UTC−05:00

Quindío	2 – 0	Jaguares
Barreiro 58'; Castillo 86'	Report

Estadio Centenario, Armenia
Referee: Adrián Vélez

December 14, 2014
15:30 UTC−05:00

Jaguares	3 – 0	Quindío
Arrieta 31'; Mezu 44'; Saldaña 68'	Report

Estadio Municipal de Montería, Montería
Referee: Wilman Roldán

Torneo Postobón
2014 champion

1st title

== Aggregate table ==
Pos	Team	Pld	W	D	L	GF	GA	GD	Pts	Promotion or qualification
1	Jaguares (C, P)	50	25	9	16	72	56	+16	84	Promotion to 2015 Categoría Primera A
2	Quindío (Q)	48	22	14	12	66	42	+24	80	Promotion/relegation playoff
3	Atlético Bucaramanga	46	23	11	12	56	42	+14	80	
4	Rionegro	46	23	9	14	69	57	+12	78	
5	América	48	20	17	11	67	50	+17	77	
6	Cúcuta Deportivo	44	21	10	13	49	43	+6	73	
7	Unión Magdalena	44	19	12	13	63	52	+11	69	
8	Llaneros	40	16	12	12	53	47	+6	60	
9	Real Cartagena	36	16	9	11	44	35	+9	57	
10	Deportivo Pereira	42	14	13	15	56	54	+2	55	
11	Valledupar	36	15	7	14	45	36	+9	52	
12	Universitario de Popayán	36	13	6	17	42	54	−12	45	
13	Cortuluá	36	12	8	16	42	45	−3	44	
14	Real Santander	36	10	10	16	38	52	−14	40	
15	Barranquilla	36	8	9	19	29	52	−23	33	
16	Bogotá	36	6	10	20	32	56	−24	28	
17	Expreso Rojo	36	6	9	21	28	48	−20	27	
18	Depor	36	6	7	23	35	65	−30	25	

Rules for classification: 1) points; 2) goal difference; 3) number of goals scored.
(C) Champions; (P) Promoted; (Q) Qualified for the phase indicated

== Promotion/relegation playoff ==
Quindío, the 2014 Categoría Primera B runner-up, played the second worst team in the Categoría Primera A relegation table, Uniautónoma for a berth in the 2015 Categoría Primera A season. As the Primera A team, Uniautónoma played the second leg at home. The winner was determined by points, followed by goal difference, then a penalty shootout. Uniautónoma defeated Quindío 2–0 on aggregate score and will remain in the top tier for the 2015 season.

Team 1	Agg.	Team 2	1st leg	2nd leg
Quindío	0–2	Uniautónoma	0–0	0–2
