= Jefferson Duque =

Colombian footballer (born 1987)

Personal information
- Full name: Jefferson Andrés Duque Montoya
- Date of birth: 17 May 1987 (age 39)
- Place of birth: Medellín, Colombia
- Height: 1.84 m (6 ft 0 in)
- Position: Forward

Team information
- Current team: Atlético Nacional
- Number: 9

Senior career*
Years	Team	Apps	(Gls)
2005	Depor Aguablanca	0	(0)
2006–2009	Deportivo Pereira	43	(18)
2011–2012	Deportivo Rionegro	44	(31)
2012–2016	Atlético Nacional	80	(34)
2016	→ Atlas (loan)	11	(5)
2016–2019	Atlas	47	(11)
2017	→ Deportivo Cali (loan)	40	(16)
2018	→ Morelia (loan)	4	(0)
2019	Santa Fe	23	(6)
2020–2024	Atlético Nacional	127	(48)
- * Club domestic league appearances and goals

Jefferson Andrés Duque Montoya (born May 17, 1987) is a Colombian professional footballer who is currently a free agent.

== Career ==
Duque began his career with Cali-based club Depor FC in the Primera B, where he only played a few friendlies but never received minutes in an official match. In 2006, he joined Deportivo Pereira of the top flight where he had a good spell, scoring 18 goals in 43 appearances.

In January 2011, he joined Deportivo Rionegro of the Primera B to regain form as he was struggling with form in the Primera A. Duque had an excellent spell with the club, and he was the top goalscorer of the 2011 Finalizacion, with eleven goals, and 2012 Apertura, with twenty goals. His goals in the 2012 season led Rionegro to the playoffs of the Apertura, and to the final in the Finalizacion, where Rionegro lost 4–1 on aggregate to Alianza Petrolera.

His performances for Rionegro grabbed the interest of powerhouse club Atlético Nacional, who signed him in July 2012. He made his debut on 18 July in the first leg of the Superliga against Junior, a match which Nacional won 3–1, and becoming one of the few Nacional players to score a brace on their debut. Four days later, he scored again in a 3–0 victory, with Nacional winning the title 6–1 on aggregate. On 26 August he scored a brace in a victory at Deportes Tolima, but an injury caused him to miss the rest of the 2012 Finalizacion tournament. In February 2013, Duque was given the all clear by the medical staff and he began to train regularly. He made his return on 9 April 2013, scoring a hat-trick against his former club Deportivo Rionegro

== Honours ==
=== Club ===
Atlético Nacional

- Categoría Primera A (5): 2013-I, 2013-II, 2014-I, 2015–II, 2022–I
- Copa Colombia (4): 2012, 2013, 2021, 2023
- Superliga Colombiana (3): 2012, 2016, 2023
- Copa Libertadores: 2016

=== Individual ===
- Categoría Primera A topscorer (1):
  - 2015-II (15 goals)
  - 2021-I (11 goals)
- Categoría Primera B topscorer (2):
  - 2011 (11 goals)
  - 2012 (20 goals)
