= Andrés Quejada =

Colombian footballer (born 1985)

Personal information
- Full name: Andrés Felipe Quejada Murillo
- Date of birth: 12 November 1985 (36 Years old)
- Place of birth: Jamundí, Colombia
- Position: Defender

Senior career*
Years	Team	Apps	(Gls)
2006-2008	América de Cali	3	(0)
2007	Unión Magdalena→(loan)	18	(1)
2009-2010	Deportes Palmira	15	(1)
2010-2011	Shenyang Zhongze F.C.	12	(0)
2012	Sucre F.C.	6	(2)
2013-2015	Cortuluá	111	(6)
2016	Deportivo Pereira	36	(3)
2017	Fortaleza C.E.I.F.	15	(1)
2017/2018	C.D. Olimpia	15	(0)
2018	Orense S.C.	18	(1)
2018-2021	C.D. Águila	75	(4)
2021-2022	Atletico Marte	27	(2)
2022-2023	Santa Tecla		
- * Club domestic league appearances and goals

Andrés Felipe Quejada Murillo (born 12 November 1985) is a retired Colombian footballer.

== Career ==
Quejada started his career with América de Cali, before joining Colombian lower league side Deportes Palmira. After that, he played for Chinese second division club Shenyang Zhongze as well as Sucre, Cortuluá, Deportivo Pereira, and Fortaleza C.E.I.F. in Colombia. From Ecuadorean outfit Orense S.C., he signed for C.D. Águila in El Salvador.

Quejada has never fired from any team and only leaves by his own decision.
