= Tommy Tobar =

Colombian footballer (born 1986)

Personal information
- Full name: Tommy Tobar Reyes
- Date of birth: 21 November 1986 (age 39)
- Place of birth: San Andrés, Colombia
- Height: 1.83 m (6 ft 0 in)
- Position: Striker

Team information
- Current team: Nacional Potosí
- Number: 9

Senior career*
Years	Team	Apps	(Gls)
2002–2004	Pumas de Casanare		
2005–2008	Millonarios	6	(0)
2007	→ Bogotá (loan)	17	(4)
2008	→ Girardot (loan)	17	(4)
2009	Deportes Palmira	10	(4)
2011	Pacífico	24	(12)
2011–2012	Cúcuta Deportivo	21	(4)
2012	Sucre	13	(1)
2013	Cortuluá	36	(7)
2014	Atlético Bucaramanga	34	(14)
2015	Patriotas Boyacá	8	(0)
2015–2016	Nacional Potosí	42	(17)
2016–2017	Al-Shamal	10	(8)
2017–2018	Carabobo	65	(32)
2018–2019	Al-Ittihad Kalba	25	(7)
2019–2021	Emirates Club	14	(7)
2021	Atlético Venezuela	22	(11)
2022–2023	Nacional Potosí	65	(43)
2024–2025	Universitario de Vinto	51	(21)
2025–	Nacional Potosí	5	(3)
- * Club domestic league appearances and goals as of 30 December 2025

Tommy Tobar Reyes (born 21 November 1986) is a Colombian footballer who plays as a striker for Bolivian club Nacional Potosí.

== Career ==
Tobar started his senior career with Pumas de Casanare. After that, he played for Millonarios, Bogotá, Deportes Palmira, Pacífico, Cúcuta Deportivo, Sucre, Cortuluá, Atlético Bucaramanga, Patriotas Boyacá, Nacional Potosí, Al-Shamal SC, and Carabobo. In 2018, he signed for Al-Ittihad Kalba SC in the UAE Pro League, where he made twenty-eight appearances and scored seven goals.
