= José Fernando Cuadrado =

Colombian footballer (born 1985)

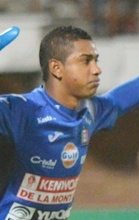
- Cuadrado with Once Caldas in 2015

Personal information
- Full name: José Fernando Cuadrado Romero
- Date of birth: 1 June 1985 (age 41)
- Place of birth: Valledupar, Cesar, Colombia
- Height: 1.80 m (5 ft 11 in)
- Position: Goalkeeper

Youth career
- 2004: Millonarios

Senior career*
Years	Team	Apps	(Gls)
2005–2009	Millonarios	70	(0)
2010	Deportivo Cali	6	(0)
2011–2012	Deportivo Pasto	85	(1)
2013–2018	Once Caldas	228	(0)
2019–2021	Atlético Nacional	57	(0)
Total		446	(1)

International career
2014-2018	Colombia	1	(0)
- * Club domestic league appearances and goals

José Fernando Cuadrado Romero (born 1 June 1985) is a Colombian former professional footballer who plays as a goalkeeper.

== Career ==
In 2018, he was named in Colombia's 23-man squad for the World Cup in Russia.

== Career statistics ==
=== Club ===
Appearances and goals by club, season and competition
Club	Season	League			National cup		Continental		Other		Total	
Club	Season	Division	Apps	Goals	Apps	Goals	Apps	Goals	Apps	Goals	Apps	Goals
Millonarios	2005	Categoría Primera A	8	0	—		—		—		8	0
Millonarios	2006	Categoría Primera A	9	0	—		—		—		9	0
Millonarios	2007	Categoría Primera A	10	0	—		5	0	—		15	0
Millonarios	2008	Categoría Primera A	21	0	1	0	—		—		22	0
Millonarios	2009	Categoría Primera A	22	0	4	0	—		—		26	0
Millonarios	Total		70	0	5	0	5	0	—		80	0
Deportivo Cali	2010	Categoría Primera A	6	0	0	0	—		—		6	0
Deportivo Pasto	2011	Categoría Primera A	43	1	6	0	—		—		49	1
Deportivo Pasto	2012	Categoría Primera A	42	0	7	0	—		—		49	0
Deportivo Pasto	Total		85	1	13	0	—		—		98	1
Once Caldas	2013	Categoría Primera A	42	0	2	0	—		—		44	0
Once Caldas	2014	Categoría Primera A	39	0	6	0	—		—		45	0
Once Caldas	2015	Categoría Primera A	37	0	0	0	2	0	—		39	0
Once Caldas	2016	Categoría Primera A	34	0	2	0	—		—		36	0
Once Caldas	2017	Categoría Primera A	38	0	6	0	—		—		44	0
Once Caldas	2018	Categoría Primera A	38	0	8	0	—		—		46	0
Once Caldas	Total		228	0	24	0	2	0	—		254	0
Atlético Nacional	2019	Categoría Primera A	44	0	3	0	6	0	—		53	0
Atlético Nacional	2020	Categoría Primera A	13	0	—		2	0	—		15	0
Atlético Nacional	Total		57	0	3	0	8	0	—		68	0
Career total			446	1	45	0	15	0	0	0	506	1

=== International ===
Appearances and goals by national team and year
National team	Year	Apps	Goals
Colombia	2014	0	0
Colombia	2017	1	0
Colombia	2018	0	0
Total		1	0

== Honours ==
Deportivo Cali

- Copa Colombia: 2010

Deportivo Pasto

- Categoría Primera B: 2011

== See also ==
- List of goalscoring goalkeepers
