= Cristian Correa =

Cristian Correa may refer to:

- Cristian Correa (footballer, born 1985), Colombian midfielder
- Cristian Correa (footballer, born 1991), Argentine goalkeeper
