= Luis Estacio =

Colombian goalkeeper (born 1980)

Personal information
- Full name: Luis Alberto Estacio Valverde
- Date of birth: 19 April 1980 (age 46)
- Place of birth: Cali, Colombia
- Height: 1.86 m (6 ft 1 in)
- Position: Goalkeeper

Team information
- Current team: Deportes Quindío
- Number: 12

Senior career*
Years	Team	Apps	(Gls)
2002–2003	Independiente Medellín		
2004–2005	Deportivo Pereira		
2005	Deportivo Cali		
2006–2012	Atlético Huila	198	(0)
2010	→ Junior Barranquilla (loan)	6	(0)
2012–2013	Cúcuta Deportivo	35	(0)
2013	Itagüí	9	(0)
2014	Deportes Tolima	12	(0)
2014	Unión Magdalena	22	(0)
2015	Boyacá Chicó	14	(0)
2015–2016	Deportivo Pasto	8	(0)
2018	Atlético	11	(0)
2019–	Deportes Quindío	16	(0)
- * Club domestic league appearances and goals as of 18:57, 8 June 2020 (UTC)

Luis Alberto Estacio Valverde (born April 19, 1980) is a Colombian goalkeeper who plays for Deportes Quindío.

== Career ==
=== International career ===
He was given his first Colombia national football team call up for the friendly against Mexico on September 30, 2009.
