= 2011 Categoría Primera B season =

Torneo Postobón
- Season: 2011
- Champions: Apertura: Patriotas; Finalización: Deportivo Pasto; Season: Deportivo Pasto
- Promoted: Deportivo Pasto; Patriotas
- Relegated: None
- Biggest home win: Patriotas 6-1 Dépor
- Biggest away win: U. Magdalena 0-3 Barranquilla Barranquilla 0-3 U. Autónoma Bogotá 0-3 Pasto
- Highest scoring: Centauros 5-3 U. Magdalena

The 2011 Categoría Primera B season is the 22nd season since its founding and is officially called the 2011 Torneo Postobón for sponsorship reasons.

== Teams ==
Name	City	Stadium
Academia F.C.	Bogotá	Estadio Compensar
Alianza Petrolera	Barrancabermeja	Estadio Daniel Villa Zapata
Atlético Bucaramanga	Bucaramanga	Estadio Alfonso Lopez
Barranquilla F.C.	Barranquilla	Estadio Romelio Martínez
Bogotá F.C.	Bogotá	Estadio Alfonso López Pumarejo
Cortuluá	Tuluá	Estadio Doce de Octubre
Centauros	Villavicencio	Estadio Manuel Calle Lombana
Depor Aguablanca	Jamundí	Estadio Cacique Jamundí
Deportivo Pasto	Pasto	Estadio Departamental Libertad
Deportivo Rionegro	Rionegro	Estadio Alberto Grisales
Expreso Rojo	Soacha	Estadio Luis Carlos Galán Sarmiento
Fortaleza F.C.	Zipaquirá	Estadio Municipal Los Zipas
Pacifico F.C.	Buenaventura	Polideportivo El Cristal
Patriotas F.C.	Tunja	Estadio de La Independencia
Real Santander	Bucaramanga	Estadio Alfonso Lopez
Unión Magdalena	Santa Marta	Estadio Eduardo Santos
Universidad Autónoma F.C.	Sabanalarga	Estadio Marcos Henríques
Valledupar F.C.	Valledupar	Estadio Armando Maestre Pavajeau

== Torneo Apertura ==
=== First phase ===
==== Standings ====
Pos	Team	Pld	W	D	L	GF	GA	GD	Pts	Qualification
1	Deportivo Pasto	18	12	3	3	32	8	+24	39	Advanced to the Quarterfinals
2	Deportivo Rionegro	18	10	2	6	25	19	+6	32	Advanced to the Quarterfinals
3	Pacífico	18	8	5	5	24	19	+5	29	Advanced to the Quarterfinals
4	Academia	18	8	5	5	18	15	+3	29	Advanced to the Quarterfinals
5	Patriotas	18	8	5	5	22	20	+2	29	2011 Torneo Postobon Finals (Note: Patriotas are qualified as Apertura champions.)
6	Valledupar	18	8	4	6	16	14	+2	28	Advanced to the Quarterfinals
7	Uniautónoma	18	8	3	7	30	22	+8	27	Advanced to the Quarterfinals
8	Cortuluá	18	8	3	7	21	18	+3	27	Advanced to the Quarterfinals
9	Atlético Bucaramanga	18	8	3	7	20	25	−5	27	
10	Fortaleza	18	6	8	4	20	19	+1	26	
11	Bogotá	18	7	3	8	20	24	−4	24	
12	Expreso Rojo	18	5	7	6	25	24	+1	22	
13	Depor	18	5	6	7	22	28	−6	21	
14	Real Santander	18	5	5	8	24	25	−1	20	
15	Centauros	18	5	3	10	22	25	−3	18	
16	Barranquilla	18	4	6	8	13	19	−6	18	
17	Unión Magdalena	18	4	4	10	24	38	−14	16	
18	Alianza Petrolera	18	3	5	10	12	28	−16	14	

Updated to match(es) played on May 14, 2011. Source:
Rules for classification: 1) points; 2) goal difference; 3) number of goals scored.

==== Results ====
Home \ Away	ACA	AP	BAR	BUC	BOG	CEN	COR	DEP	PAS	EXP	FOR	PAC	PAT	RSA	RIO	MAG	UAU	VAL
Academia		0–0	2–0		2–0	2–0		1–1	1–0		0–2		0–1				1–0	
Alianza Petrolera				2–1		4–3	0–1	0–1			0–0	1–0			0–1	1–1	1–1	
Barranquilla		2–0			1–0	1–0		1–1		0–2		0–2		1–1			0–0	1–1
Atlético Bucaramanga	1–0		0–0						1–0	1–0	0–0	1–0		2–1	2–1			2–1
Bogotá	3–1	2–0		1–0		1–0	1–2	2–2							0–2	3–0	2–1	
Centauros				4–0			0–1					0–1	1–1	1–2	1–2	5–3	2–1	2–1
Cortuluá	2–0		2–0	4–0						1–3		2–3		1–0	0–1	5–1		0–0
Depor				1–2		0–1	2–0		2–3			0–1			3–1	2–1	3–3	2–0
Deportivo Pasto		3–0	0–0		0–0	1–0	4–0	4–0					3–0			3–0	1–0	
Expreso Rojo	1–1	4–1			4–0	0–0		0–0	0–2		1–1		2–2		2–2			
Fortaleza		2–1	2–1		1–1	2–2	0–0	0–0	2–4				1–1				3–1	
Pacífico	1–1				4–2		0–0		1–2	2–3	2–0		1–0	1–1				1–1
Patriotas		0–0	2–1	1–0	1–0	2–0	1–0	6–1								1–1	2–1	
Real Santander	2–3	5–1		1–1	0–2			2–1	0–0	1–0	1–2		4–0					
Deportivo Rionegro	1–1		2–0						0–2	3–1	0–1	1–2	2–1	2–0				1–0
Unión Magdalena	0–1		0–3	5–2						5–2	2–0	1–1		1–1	2–0			0–2
Uniautónoma			2–1	2–1			2–0			2–0		3–1		4–1	1–2	4–1		2–0
Valledupar	0–1	1–0			3–0				1–0	0–0	1–0		1–0	2–1		1–0		

Updated to match(es) played on May 14, 2011. Source:
Legend: Blue = home team win; Yellow = draw; Red = away team win.

=== Knockout phase ===
Quarterfinals
3	Pacifico (p)	1	2	3 (4)
7	Uniautonoma	3	0	3 (1)
2	Rionegro	0	0	0
8	Cortulua	1	2	3
5	Academia	1	0	1
4	Patriotas	0	2	2
1	Deportivo Pasto	0	1	1 (2)
6	Valledupar (p)	0	1	1 (3)

Semifinals
3	Pacifico	1	0	1 (4)
8	Cortulua	0	1	1 (5)
4	Patriotas	1	1	2
6	Valledupar	0	0	0

Finals
8	Cortulua	0	0	0 (4)
4	Patriotas (p)	0	0	0 (5)

Torneo Postobón
2011-I Champion

1st title

== Torneo Finalización ==
=== First stage ===
==== Standings ====
Pos	Team	Pld	W	D	L	GF	GA	GD	Pts	Qualification
1	Deportivo Pasto	18	9	7	2	32	15	+17	34	Advance to the Quarterfinals
2	Centauros	18	8	7	3	28	25	+3	31	Advance to the Quarterfinals
3	Alianza Petrolera	18	8	5	5	24	16	+8	29	Advance to the Quarterfinals
4	Bogotá	18	8	5	5	26	21	+5	29	Advance to the Quarterfinals
5	Deportivo Rionegro	18	8	4	6	33	23	+10	28	Advance to the Quarterfinals
6	Uniautónoma	18	8	4	6	33	24	+9	28	Advance to the Quarterfinals
7	Expreso Rojo	18	7	7	4	21	15	+6	28	Advance to the Quarterfinals
8	Academia	18	7	7	4	27	24	+3	28	Advance to the Quarterfinals
9	Real Santander	18	7	6	5	23	19	+4	27	
10	Fortaleza	18	6	8	4	20	18	+2	26	
11	Atlético Bucaramanga	18	5	8	5	16	18	−2	23	
12	Valledupar	18	7	2	9	22	28	−6	23	
13	Unión Magdalena	18	5	5	8	19	22	−3	20	
14	Cortuluá	18	4	8	6	22	27	−5	20	
15	Patriotas	18	4	6	8	21	25	−4	18	
16	Pacífico	18	3	6	9	14	28	−14	15	
17	Barranquilla	18	3	5	10	12	28	−16	14	
18	Depor	18	2	6	10	15	32	−17	12	

Updated to match(es) played on November 5, 2011. Source:
Rules for classification: 1) points; 2) goal difference; 3) number of goals scored.

==== Results ====
Home \ Away	ACA	AP	BAR	BUC	BOG	CEN	COR	DEP	PAS	EXP	FOR	PAC	PAT	RSA	RIO	MAG	UAU	VAL
Academia				2–0	2–2		3–3			1–1		3–0		3–1	2–0	1–0		3–0
Alianza Petrolera	3–0		1–1		1–1				2–0	1–0	2–0		1–0	2–1				0–1
Barranquilla	0–2			1–1			2–1		1–1		1–1		1–0		2–1	1–3	0–3	
Atlético Bucaramanga		0–0			1–1	0–3	1–0	1–0					2–2	2–3		1–0	0–1	
Bogotá	1–1		1–0						0–3	2–1	3–0	4–0	2–1	0–0				3–0
Centauros	1–1	2–1	1–0		3–1			3–1	1–1	1–1	3–2		2–1					
Cortuluá		3–3			2–1	0–0		3–1	1–1		1–1	0–0	2–1				2–1	
Depor	2–2	0–4	1–0		0–2				1–2	1–1	1–1		0–0	2–3				
Deportivo Pasto	3–0			1–1				4–0		1–1	1–0	4–1		3–0	1–0			1–0
Expreso Rojo			2–0	1–1			1–0					1–0		1–2	1–2	3–1	2–0	1–0
Fortaleza	2–0	1–0		0–0						1–1		0–0		1–1	3–3	2–0		2–1
Pacífico		1–0	3–1	2–0		2–2	0–0	0–2							0–0	1–2	2–2	
Patriotas	1–1					2–2			2–2	1–2	0–1	2–1		2–1	3–1			3–0
Real Santander			0–0	0–1		5–0	1–0					2–0			2–2	0–0	0–0	1–0
Deportivo Rionegro		4–0		1–3	3–0	4–0	4–0	2–0		0–0						1–0	5–3	
Unión Magdalena		1–3			0–1	1–1	3–3	0–0	2–1				0–0				2–0	3–1
Uniautónoma	4–0	0–0	4–1		3–1	2–1		2–1	2–2		0–2		4–0					
Valledupar			2–0	1–1		0–3	3–1	2–2				3–1			3–0	2–1	3–2	

Updated to match(es) played on November 5, 2011. Source:
Legend: Blue = home team win; Yellow = draw; Red = away team win.

=== Knockout stage ===
==== Bracket ====
Quarterfinals
1	Deportivo Pasto	1	4	5
6	Uniautonoma	1	0	1
4	Bogotá	0	0	0 (4)
7	Expreso Rojo (p)	0	0	0 (5)
2	Centauros (p)	0	4	4 (4)
8	Academia	2	2	4 (2)
3	Alianza Petrolera	0	1	1
5	Rionegro	3	1	4

Semifinals
1	Deportivo Pasto	1	5	6
7	Expreso Rojo	1	1	2
2	Centauros (p)	0	3	3 (5)
5	Rionegro	1	2	3 (4)

Final
1	Deportivo Pasto	1	1	2
2	Centauros	1	0	1

Torneo Postobón
2011-II Champion

== Finals ==
Pos	Team	Pld	W	D	L	GF	GA	GD	Pts	Promotion or qualification
1	Deportivo Pasto	2	1	0	1	1	1	0	3	Promotion to Categoria Primera A
2	Patriotas	2	1	0	1	1	1	0	3	Promotion/relegation playoff

Torneo Postobón
2011 Season Champions

2nd title

== Promotion/relegation playoff ==
As the second worst team in the relegation table, América had to play a two-legged tie against Patriotas, the 2011 Categoría Primera B runner-up. As the Primera A team, América will play the second leg at home. The winner will be determined by points, followed by goal difference, then a penalty shootout. The winner will be promoted/remain in the Primera A for the 2012 season, while the loser will be relegated/remain in the Primera B.

Teams			Scores		Tie-breakers	
Team 1	Points	Team 2	1st leg	2nd leg	GD	Pen.
América	2:2	Patriotas	1–1	1–1	0:0	3:4

== Aggregate table ==
Pos	Team	Pld	W	D	L	GF	GA	GD	Pts	Promotion or qualification
1	Deportivo Pasto (C, P)	47	25	16	6	54	19	+35	91	Promotion to 2012 Categoría Primera A
2	Deportivo Rionegro	42	20	7	15	65	50	+15	67	
3	Academia	40	17	12	11	50	45	+5	63	
4	Patriotas (P)	44	16	13	15	48	47	+1	61	Promotion/relegation playoff (Note: Patriotas is qualified as the Apertura champion.)
5	Uniautónoma	40	17	8	15	67	54	+13	59	
6	Cortuluá	42	15	13	14	47	46	+1	58	
7	Centauros	42	15	11	16	59	59	0	56	
8	Bogotá	38	15	10	13	46	45	+1	55	
9	Expreso Rojo	40	12	17	11	48	45	+3	53	
10	Valledupar	40	15	8	17	39	45	−6	53	
11	Fortaleza	36	12	16	8	40	37	+3	52	
12	Atlético Bucaramanga	36	13	11	12	36	43	−7	50	
13	Pacífico	40	13	11	16	42	51	−9	50	
14	Real Santander	36	12	11	13	48	45	+3	47	
15	Alianza Petrolera	38	11	11	16	37	48	−11	44	
16	Unión Magdalena	36	9	9	18	43	60	−17	36	
17	Depor	36	7	12	17	37	60	−23	33	
18	Barranquilla	36	7	11	18	25	47	−22	32	

Rules for classification: 1) points; 2) goal difference; 3) number of goals scored.
(C) Champions; (P) Promoted
