= Depor =

Depor may refer to one or more football (soccer) teams named Deportivo:

- Depor F.C., Cali, Colombia
- Deportivo Cali, Cali, Colombia
- Deportivo Pasto, Pasto, Colombia
- Deportivo de La Coruña, A Coruña, Galicia, Spain
