= 2014 Superliga Colombiana =

Deportivo Cali	Atlético Nacional
2	2
- on aggregate Deportivo Cali won 4–3 on penalties

First leg
Deportivo Cali	Atlético Nacional
2	1
- Date: 22 January 2014
- Venue: Estadio Olímpico Pascual Guerrero, Cali
- Referee: Juan Pontón

Second leg
Atlético Nacional	Deportivo Cali
1	0
- Date: 29 January 2014
- Venue: Estadio Atanasio Girardot, Medellín
- Referee: Juan Carlos Gamarra

The 2014 Superliga Colombiana was the third edition of the Superliga Colombiana.

Deportivo Cali was the winner and qualified for the 2014 Copa Sudamericana.

== Teams ==
Team	Qualification	Previous appearances (bold indicates winners)
Atlético Nacional	2013 Apertura champions and 2013 Finalización champions	1 (**2012**)
Deportivo Cali	2013 Primera A aggregate table second best team	None

Since Atlético Nacional won both the Apertura and Finalización, Deportivo Cali qualified as the 2013 Primera A aggregate table second best team.

== Matches ==
=== First leg ===
January 22, 2014
19:00 UTC−5

Deportivo Cali	2–1	Atlético Nacional
Ramírez 19', 20'	Report	Medina 85' (pen.)

Estadio Olímpico Pascual Guerrero, Cali
Attendance: 15,947
Referee: Juan Pontón

=== Second leg ===
January 29, 2014
19:00 UTC−5

Atlético Nacional	1–0	Deportivo Cali
Duque 28'	Report
Penalties
Medina (penalty scored); Cárdenas (penalty missed); Cardona (penalty scored); Valencia (penalty missed); Bocanegra (penalty scored)	3–4	(penalty missed) Pérez; (penalty scored) Ramírez; (penalty scored) Marín; (penalty scored) Torijano; (penalty scored) Viáfara

Estadio Atanasio Girardot, Medellín
Attendance: 18,426
Referee: Juan Carlos Gamarra
