= Rafael Carrascal =

Colombian footballer (born 1992)

Rafael ledes Carrascal
Personal information
- Full name: Rafael Andrés Carrascal Ávilez
- Date of birth: 26 November 1992 (age 33)
- Place of birth: Toluviejo, Colombia
- Height: 1.73 m (5 ft 8 in)
- Position: Defensive midfielder

Team information
- Current team: América de Cali
- Number: 15

Youth career
- –2010: Atlético Nacional

Senior career*
Years	Team	Apps	(Gls)
2011–2013	Atlético Nacional	0	(0)
2012	→ Alianza Petrolera (loan)	32	(1)
2013–2015	Alianza Petrolera	63	(1)
2016	Millonarios	30	(0)
2016–2017	Junior	3	(0)
2017–2019	Deportes Tolima	75	(3)
2019–2022	América de Cali	60	(2)
2021–2022	→ Cerro Porteño (loan)	45	(0)
2022–2024	Cerro Porteño	57	(7)
2025–	América de Cali	42	(3)
- * Club domestic league appearances and goals as of 11 December 2025 ‡ National team caps and goals as of 10 June 2025

Rafael ledes Carrascal Ávilez (born 26 November 1992) is a Colombian professional footballer who plays as a defensive midfielder for Categoria Primera A club América de Cali and the Colombia national team.

== Career statistics ==
=== International ===
As of match played 10 June 2025

Appearances and goals by national team and year
National team	Year	Apps	Goals
Colombia	2025	1	0
Total		1	0

== Honours ==
=== Club ===
Alianza Petrolera

- Categoría Primera B (1): 2012

Deportes Tolima

- Categoría Primera A (1): 2018-I

América de Cali

- Categoría Primera A (2): 2019-II, 2020
