= 2015 Categoría Primera A season =

Liga Águila
- Season: 2015
- Champions: Apertura: Deportivo Cali (9th title); Finalización: Atlético Nacional (15th title)
- Relegated: Uniautónoma; Cúcuta Deportivo
- Copa Libertadores: Deportivo Cali; Atlético Nacional; Santa Fe (Copa Sudamericana winner)
- Copa Sudamericana: Santa Fe (Copa Sudamericana winner); Junior (cup winner); Atlético Nacional (Superliga winner); Independiente Medellín; Deportes Tolima
- Top goalscorer: Apertura: Fernando Uribe (15 goals); Finalización: Jefferson Duque (15 goals)

The 2015 Categoría Primera A season (officially known as the 2015 Liga Águila season for sponsorship reasons) was the 68th season of Colombia's top-flight football league. The season started on 30 January and concluded on 20 December.

20 teams competed against one another. Santa Fe came in as the defending champions having won the title in the 2014 season's Finalización tournament. Jaguares de Córdoba entered as champion of the 2014 Primera B, while Cortuluá and Cúcuta Deportivo were promoted as the top teams of their respective groups in the Promotion tournament.

Deportivo Cali won its ninth title in the Torneo Apertura after beating Independiente Medellín in the finals, while in the Torneo Finalización Atlético Nacional won its fifteenth title after beating Junior in the finals, thus surpassing Millonarios as the club with the most championships.

== Format ==
Starting from this season, the league was expanded to 20 teams: 17 from last season plus Jaguares, the 2014 Primera B winners, and Cortuluá and Cúcuta Deportivo, the top two teams of a playoff tournament played in January 2015 between 8 Primera B sides to fill up the field of 20 teams. The Apertura and Finalización tournaments had a similar format and were divided into three stages: a First Stage which was contested on a single round-robin basis, with each team playing the other teams once and playing a regional rival once more for a total of 20 matches. The top eight teams after the twenty rounds advanced to a knockout round, where they were pitted into four ties to be played on a home-and-away basis, with the four winners advancing to the semifinals and the winner of each semifinal advancing to the final of the tournament, which were played on a home-and-away basis as well. The winner of the final was declared the tournament champion and will participate in the 2016 Copa Libertadores.

== Teams ==
=== Stadia and locations ===
Locations of the 2015 Categoría Primera A teams

Team	City	Stadium	2014 season
Águilas Doradas^{a}	Rionegro	Alberto Grisales	4th
Alianza Petrolera	Barrancabermeja	Daniel Villa Zapata^{b}	10th
Atlético Huila	Neiva	Guillermo Plazas Alcid^{c}	8th
Atlético Nacional	Medellín	Atanasio Girardot	2nd
Boyacá Chicó	Tunja	La Independencia	13th
Cortuluá	Tuluá	Doce de Octubre	13th (Primera B)^{d}
Cúcuta Deportivo	Cúcuta	General Santander	6th (Primera B)^{d}
Deportes Tolima	Ibagué	Manuel Murillo Toro^{e}	11th
Deportivo Cali	Cali	Deportivo Cali	9th
Deportivo Pasto	Pasto	Departamental Libertad	16th
Envigado	Envigado	Polideportivo Sur	12th
Independiente Medellín	Medellín	Atanasio Girardot	6th
Jaguares	Montería	Municipal de Montería	1st (Primera B)
Junior	Barranquilla	Metropolitano	5th
La Equidad	Bogotá	Metropolitano de Techo	15th
Millonarios	Bogotá	Nemesio Camacho	7th
Once Caldas	Manizales	Palogrande	3rd
Patriotas	Tunja	La Independencia	14th
Santa Fe	Bogotá	Nemesio Camacho	1st
Uniautónoma	Barranquilla	Metropolitano	18th

a: Previously based in Pereira, played their first four home games at Estadio Hernán Ramírez Villegas.
b: Previously played at Estadio Álvaro Gómez Hurtado in Floridablanca.
c: Temporarily played its home games at Estadio Centenario in Armenia and Estadio Luis Antonio Duque in Girardot due to remodeling works at Estadio Guillermo Plazas Alcid.
d: Promoted through the Promotion tournament.
e: Temporarily played its home games at Estadio Metropolitano de Techo in Bogotá due to remodeling works at Estadio Manuel Murillo Toro.

== Torneo Apertura ==
=== First stage ===
The First Stage began on 30 January and consisted of twenty rounds including a series of regional rivalries in the tenth round. It ended on 17 May with the top eight teams at the end of this stage advancing to the knockout stage.

==== Standings ====
Pos	Team	Pld	W	D	L	GF	GA	GD	Pts	Qualification
1	Atlético Huila	20	12	5	3	33	22	+11	41	Advanced to the knockout phase
2	Envigado	20	10	6	4	21	13	+8	36	Advanced to the knockout phase
3	Deportivo Cali	20	10	5	5	36	24	+12	35	Advanced to the knockout phase
4	Independiente Medellín	20	10	5	5	31	22	+9	35	Advanced to the knockout phase
5	Millonarios	20	9	7	4	36	23	+13	34	Advanced to the knockout phase
6	Atlético Nacional	20	10	4	6	33	24	+9	34	Advanced to the knockout phase
7	Deportes Tolima	20	9	6	5	29	16	+13	33	Advanced to the knockout phase
8	Junior	20	9	6	5	27	16	+11	33	Advanced to the knockout phase
9	Santa Fe	20	8	7	5	29	19	+10	31	
10	Águilas Doradas	20	8	6	6	23	16	+7	30	
11	Patriotas	20	7	6	7	17	18	−1	27	
12	La Equidad	20	6	8	6	21	21	0	26	
13	Once Caldas	20	5	8	7	29	32	−3	23	
14	Cortuluá	20	5	6	9	22	25	−3	21	
15	Jaguares	20	5	6	9	21	32	−11	21	
16	Alianza Petrolera	20	3	11	6	17	22	−5	20	
17	Boyacá Chicó	20	3	8	9	16	29	−13	17	
18	Cúcuta Deportivo	20	2	9	9	16	33	−17	15	
19	Uniautónoma	20	3	6	11	13	30	−17	15	
20	Deportivo Pasto	20	2	3	15	11	44	−33	9	

Source: DIMAYOR
Rules for classification: 1) Points, 2) Goal difference, 3) Goals for, 4) Away goals for, 5) Away goals against, 6) Drawing of lots

==== Results ====
Home \ Away	AGU	APE	HUI	NAC	BOY	COR	CUC	TOL	CAL	PAS	ENV	DIM	JAG	JUN	EQU	MIL	ONC	PAT	SFE	UAU
Águilas Doradas						1–0		0–0	2–1	6–0		0–1	1–0			0–0	2–1		1–1	1–0
Alianza Petrolera	1–0		1–1	0–1		1–1	3–2				1–2			0–0	2–2			2–1	0–1	
Atlético Huila	3–3						3–0	1–1		3–1	2–1		2–1			2–2	1–0		2–2	3–1
Atlético Nacional	2–0		1–2			1–3	2–2	2–0				3–1		2–2				2–0	2–0	4–0
Boyacá Chicó	0–1	0–0	0–1	3–2		2–1					1–1			0–2	1–2			1–1		0–0
Cortuluá			0–1				0–0	1–1	2–1		1–1		1–2	2–0	0–0			2–0		0–1
Cúcuta Deportivo	2–1	0–0			1–1			1–1	2–4		0–0	0–3 (Note: DIMAYOR awarded a 3–0 away win in favor of Independiente Medellín for pitch invasion by fans of Cúcuta Deportivo. Original result was a 1–2 win for Independiente Medellín.)		1–0			1–2		2–2	
Deportes Tolima		1–0	3–1		4–1				4–1	2–1		1–2	5–0		1–0	1–0	1–1			
Deportivo Cali		0–0	0–1	3–1	3–0	1–1					0–2			3–2	2–0	5–1		0–0		
Deportivo Pasto		0–0		2–1	0–1	0–3	1–0		1–4			0–3		0–0	1–2			1–3		
Envigado	1–0			1–2				1–0		2–1		0–2	2–0			0–0	2–1		0–0	2–0
Independiente Medellín		2–2	2–0	0–1	1–1	2–1			2–2				2–2	1–2	1–0			1–0		
Jaguares		2–0		0–1	2–0		1–1		0–0	2–0	2–1				1–1	3–3	1–2			
Junior	1–1		0–1					1–1			0–0		4–0			2–0	2–1	2–0	3–1	2–1
La Equidad	0–2		1–2	2–0			3–1			1–1	0–1			1–0				0–0	2–2	1–0
Millonarios		3–1		0–0	3–1	4–1	3–0			5–1		3–1			1–1			2–0	0–0	
Once Caldas	1–1	2–2		3–3	2–2	3–2			2–3	1–0		0–2			2–2	1–2				
Patriotas	1–0		2–1		1–1		3–0	1–0			0–1		2–1				1–1		0–0	1–0
Santa Fe					1–0	3–0		1–0	0–1	4–0		3–1	3–0			1–3	0–1			4–1
Uniautónoma		1–1					0–0	0–2	1–2	1–0		1–1	1–1	0–2		2–1	2–2			

Updated to match(es) played on 17 May 2015. Source: DIMAYOR
Legend: Blue = home team win; Yellow = draw; Red = away team win.

=== Knockout phase bracket ===
Quarterfinals
4	Ind. Medellín	3	1	4
8	Junior	0	0	0
1	Atlético Huila	1	2	3
7	Deportes Tolima	2	3	5
3	Deportivo Cali	3	1	4
6	Atlético Nacional	3	0	3
2	Envigado	0	3	3
5	Millonarios	4	2	6

Semifinals
4	Ind. Medellín	0	3	3
7	Deportes Tolima	0	1	1
3	Deportivo Cali (p)	2	1	3 (4)
5	Millonarios	3	0	3 (3)

Finals
4	Ind. Medellín	0	1	1
3	Deportivo Cali	1	1	2

=== Quarterfinals ===
Team 1	Agg.	Team 2	1st leg	2nd leg
Deportes Tolima	5–3	Atlético Huila	2–1	3–2
Millonarios	6–3	Envigado	4–0	2–3
Atlético Nacional	3–4	Deportivo Cali	3–3	0–1
Junior	0–4	Independiente Medellín	0–3	0–1

Notes

1. DIMAYOR awarded a 3–0 win in favour of Independiente Medellín after a breach of rules by Junior regarding foreign players on field. Original result was a 2–2 draw.

=== Semifinals ===
Team 1	Agg.	Team 2	1st leg	2nd leg
Deportes Tolima	1–3	Independiente Medellín	0–0	1–3
Millonarios	3–3 (3–4 p)	Deportivo Cali	3–2	0–1

=== Finals ===
June 3, 2015
19:00 UTC−05:00

Deportivo Cali	1 – 0	Independiente Medellín
Preciado 17'	Report

Estadio Deportivo Cali, Palmira
Referee: Gustavo Murillo

June 7, 2015
19:00 UTC−05:00

Independiente Medellín	1 – 1	Deportivo Cali
Monsalvo 70'	Report	Roa 40'

Estadio Atanasio Girardot, Medellín
Attendance: 44,078
Referee: Juan Carlos Gamarra

=== Top goalscorers ===
Rank	Name	Club	Goals
1	(Colombia) Fernando Uribe	Millonarios	15
2	(Colombia) Harold Preciado	Deportivo Cali	13
3	(Colombia) Marco Pérez	Deportes Tolima	10
4	(Colombia) Carlos Ibargüen	Cortuluá	9
4	(Colombia) Jonathan Copete	Atlético Nacional	9

Source: DIMAYOR

== Torneo Finalización ==
=== First stage ===
The First Stage began on 10 July and featured the same format used in the Torneo Apertura, with reversed fixtures. It ended on 22 November with the top eight teams at the end of this stage advancing to the knockout stage.

==== Standings ====
Pos	Team	Pld	W	D	L	GF	GA	GD	Pts	Qualification
1	Atlético Nacional	20	14	3	3	33	7	+26	45	Advanced to the knockout phase
2	Junior	20	11	3	6	31	23	+8	36	Advanced to the knockout phase
3	Deportes Tolima	20	10	5	5	23	14	+9	35	Advanced to the knockout phase
4	Independiente Medellín	20	10	5	5	23	18	+5	35	Advanced to the knockout phase
5	Once Caldas	20	9	7	4	25	14	+11	34	Advanced to the knockout phase
6	Alianza Petrolera	20	9	6	5	18	12	+6	33	Advanced to the knockout phase
7	Deportivo Cali	20	9	5	6	30	28	+2	32	Advanced to the knockout phase
8	Santa Fe	20	8	7	5	26	15	+11	31	Advanced to the knockout phase
9	Patriotas	20	9	4	7	24	19	+5	31	
10	Deportivo Pasto	20	9	3	8	25	26	−1	30	
11	Millonarios	20	7	7	6	20	16	+4	28	
12	La Equidad	20	8	4	8	22	27	−5	28	
13	Envigado	20	6	7	7	18	18	0	25	
14	Águilas Doradas	20	5	9	6	17	16	+1	24	
15	Cortuluá	20	6	6	8	20	20	0	24	
16	Uniautónoma	20	6	4	10	18	26	−8	22	
17	Boyacá Chicó	20	4	5	11	10	29	−19	17	
18	Atlético Huila	20	3	7	10	12	28	−16	16	
19	Cúcuta Deportivo	20	3	3	14	15	37	−22	12	
20	Jaguares	20	2	4	14	18	35	−17	10	

Source: DIMAYOR
Rules for classification: 1) Points, 2) Goal difference, 3) Goals for, 4) Away goals for, 5) Away goals against, 6) Drawing of lots

==== Results ====
Home \ Away	AGU	APE	HUI	NAC	BOY	COR	CUC	TOL	CAL	PAS	ENV	DIM	JAG	JUN	EQU	MIL	ONC	PAT	SFE	UAU
Águilas Doradas		0–0	3–0	0–2	1–1		2–0				1–2			0–2	2–1		2–1	1–1		
Alianza Petrolera					1–0		1–0	2–0	3–2	1–0		1–1	1–0			1–0	0–0			2–0
Atlético Huila		1–0		0–2	0–0	1–0		1–3	0–1			0–2		2–2	1–1			0–2		
Atlético Nacional		1–0			6–1				3–0	4–0	1–0	0–0	1–0		2–0	1–0	1–2			
Boyacá Chicó							3–2	0–0	0–2	1–0		0–1	2–1			0–3	0–1	0–1	0–1	
Cortuluá	0–0	0–0		0–0	2–1				1–2	5–1		3–1				2–0	0–3		1–2	
Cúcuta Deportivo		1–2	0–1	1–2		0–0				0–2			4–0		1–1	1–1		1–0		2–1
Deportes Tolima	1–1		2–1	0–1		2–0	3–0				0–2			2–0				1–0	1–0	3–2
Deportivo Cali	0–0					1–0	2–0	1–1		2–2		4–2	0–3 (Note: DIMAYOR awarded a 3–0 away win in favor of Jaguares for Deportivo Cali fielding an unauthorized player. Original result was a 0–1 win for Jaguares.)				1–4		1–0	5–1
Deportivo Pasto	0–3		3–2					0–0			2–0		2–0		1–2	0–0	2–1		3–1	3–0
Envigado		2–1	0–0		0–0	1–2	4–1		1–1				1–0	0–1	0–2			0–1		
Independiente Medellín	0–0			1–0			4–1	1–0		1–0	2–0					2–0	0–0		1–1	1–0
Jaguares	2–1		1–1			0–0		1–2			1–3	1–2		0–1				0–2	2–2	1–2
Junior		2–1		0–4	6–0	1–2	2–0		3–1	2–0		2–0			1–1					0–2
La Equidad		0–0			1–0	1–0		0–2	1–2	0–1		2–0	4–3			2–1	1–2			
Millonarios	2–0		0–0					1–0	1–1		0–0		3–1	1–2			0–0		1–0	2–0
Once Caldas	1–0		4–0				1–0	0–0			1–1		1–1	1–1				1–3	1–0	0–1
Patriotas		1–0		0–1	0–0	2–2			2–1	1–3		3–1		1–0	1–2	2–3				
Santa Fe	0–0	1–1	2–1	1–0			5–0				1–1			3–0	4–0	1–1		0–0		
Uniautónoma	0–0		0–0	1–1	0–1	1–0					0–0			2–3	3–0			2–1	0–1	

Updated to match(es) played on 22 November 2015. Source: DIMAYOR
Legend: Blue = home team win; Yellow = draw; Red = away team win.

=== Knockout phase bracket ===
Quarterfinals
1	Atlético Nacional	0	3	3
7	Deportivo Cali	0	1	1
4	Ind. Medellín	2	4	6
6	Alianza Petrolera	0	0	0
2	Junior	1	3	4
8	Santa Fe	2	1	3
3	Deportes Tolima	0	3	3
5	Once Caldas	1	1	2

Semifinals
1	Atlético Nacional	0	2	2
4	Ind. Medellín	1	0	1
2	Junior	1	1	2
3	Deportes Tolima	0	0	0

Finals
1	Atlético Nacional (p)	1	1	2 (3)
2	Junior	2	0	2 (2)

=== Quarterfinals ===
Team 1	Agg.	Team 2	1st leg	2nd leg
Deportivo Cali	1–3	Atlético Nacional	0–0	1–3
Santa Fe	3–4	Junior	2–1	1–3
Once Caldas	2–3	Deportes Tolima	1–0	1–3
Alianza Petrolera	0–6	Independiente Medellín	0–2	0–4

=== Semifinals ===
Team 1	Agg.	Team 2	1st leg	2nd leg
Independiente Medellín	1–2	Atlético Nacional	1–0	0–2
Deportes Tolima	0–2	Junior	0–1	0–1

=== Finals ===
December 16, 2015
19:10 UTC−05:00

Junior	2 – 1	Atlético Nacional
Ovelar 16'; Toloza 22'	Report	Chará 68'

Estadio Metropolitano Roberto Meléndez, Barranquilla
Referee: Wilson Lamouroux

December 20, 2015
18:00 UTC−05:00

Atlético Nacional	1 – 0	Junior
Moreno 1'	Report
Penalties
Bocanegra (penalty missed); Chará (penalty scored); Guerra (penalty scored); Pérez (penalty scored)	3–2	(penalty missed) Noguera; (penalty scored) Narváez; (penalty scored) Ovelar; (penalty missed) Celis; (penalty missed) Cuéllar

Estadio Atanasio Girardot, Medellín
Referee: Gustavo Murillo

=== Top goalscorers ===
Rank	Name	Club	Goals
1	(Colombia) Jefferson Duque	Atlético Nacional	15
2	(Colombia) Harold Preciado	Deportivo Cali	12
3	(Colombia) Juan Caicedo	Independiente Medellín	9
3	(Paraguay) Roberto Ovelar	Junior	9
5	(Colombia) Vladimir Hernández	Junior	8
5	(Argentina) Jonathan Gómez	Deportivo Pasto	8

Source: DIMAYOR

== Relegation ==
A separate table is kept to determine the teams that get relegated to the Categoría Primera B for the next season. The table includes an average of all first stage games played for the current season and the previous two seasons.

Pos	Team	2013 Pts	2014 Pts	2015 Pts	Total Pts	Total Pld	Avg	Relegation
1	Atlético Nacional	69	63	79	211	112	1.884	
2	Santa Fe	61	61	62	184	112	1.643	
3	Junior	52	55	69	176	112	1.571	
4	Millonarios	59	53	62	174	112	1.554	
5	Deportivo Cali	58	47	67	172	112	1.536	
6	Once Caldas	56	57	57	170	112	1.518	
7	Águilas Doradas	58	57	54	169	112	1.509	
8	Independiente Medellín	47	51	70	168	112	1.5	
9	Deportes Tolima	50	45	68	163	112	1.455	
10	Envigado	39	48	61	148	112	1.321	
11	Alianza Petrolera	38	54	53	145	112	1.295	
12	Atlético Huila	40	46	57	143	112	1.277	
13	La Equidad	45	41	54	140	112	1.25	
14	Patriotas	34	45	58	137	112	1.223	
15	Deportivo Pasto	53	38	39	130	112	1.161	
16	Boyacá Chicó	34	47	34	115	112	1.027	
17	Cortuluá	34	35	45	114	112	1.018	
18	Jaguares	34	45	31	110	112	0.982	
19	Uniautónoma (R)	34	35	37	106	112	0.946	Relegation to Categoría Primera B
20	Cúcuta Deportivo (R)	34	35	27	96	112	0.857	Relegation to Categoría Primera B

Source: DIMAYOR
Rules for classification: 1st average; 2nd goal difference; 3rd number of goals scored; 4th away goals scored.

== Aggregate table ==
Pos	Team	Pld	W	D	L	GF	GA	GD	Pts	Qualification or relegation
1	Atlético Nacional (C)	48	27	9	12	76	39	+37	90	2016 Copa Libertadores Second Stage and 2016 Copa Sudamericana First Stage (Note: Atlético Nacional are qualified for the 2016 Copa Libertadores as Finalización champions and qualified for the 2016 Copa Sudamericana as Superliga Colombiana winners.)
2	Independiente Medellín	50	26	12	12	69	45	+24	90	2016 Copa Sudamericana First Stage (Note: Junior are qualified for the 2016 Copa Sudamericana as Copa Colombia winners.)
3	Junior	48	24	9	15	66	48	+18	81	2016 Copa Sudamericana First Stage
4	Deportivo Cali (C)	48	22	13	13	76	62	+14	79	2016 Copa Libertadores Second Stage (Note: Deportivo Cali are qualified for the 2016 Copa Libertadores as Apertura champions.)
5	Deportes Tolima	48	22	12	14	61	40	+21	78	2016 Copa Sudamericana First Stage
6	Millonarios	44	18	14	12	65	45	+20	68	
7	Santa Fe	42	17	14	11	58	38	+20	65	2016 Copa Libertadores First Stage and 2016 Copa Sudamericana Round of 16 (Note: Santa Fe are qualified for the 2016 Copa Libertadores and the 2016 Copa Sudamericana as Copa Sudamericana winners.)
8	Envigado	42	17	13	12	42	37	+5	64	
9	Once Caldas	42	15	15	12	56	49	+7	60	
10	Patriotas	40	16	10	14	41	37	+4	58	
11	Atlético Huila	42	15	12	15	48	55	−7	57	
12	Águilas Doradas	40	13	15	12	39	33	+6	54	
13	La Equidad	40	14	12	14	43	48	−5	54	
14	Alianza Petrolera	42	12	17	13	35	40	−5	53	
15	Cortuluá	40	11	12	17	42	45	−3	45	
16	Deportivo Pasto	40	11	6	23	36	70	−34	39	
17	Uniautónoma	40	9	10	21	31	56	−25	37	
18	Boyacá Chicó	40	7	13	20	26	58	−32	34	
19	Jaguares	40	7	10	23	39	67	−28	31	
20	Cúcuta Deportivo	40	5	12	23	31	70	−39	27	

Source: DIMAYOR
Rules for classification: 1) Points, 2) Goal difference, 3) Goals for, 4) Away goals for, 5) Away goals against, 6) Drawing of lots
(C) Champions
