= Sergio Romero (Colombian footballer) =

Colombian footballer (born 1988)

Personal information
- Full name: Sergio Esteban Romero Méndez
- Date of birth: 22 November 1988 (age 37)
- Place of birth: Bucaramanga, Colombia
- Height: 1.73 m (5 ft 8 in)
- Position: Forward

Youth career
- –2006: Florida FC
- 2006–2008: Real Santander

Senior career*
Years	Team	Apps	(Gls)
2008–2014	Real Santander	140	(51)
2012–2013	→ Once Caldas (loan)	42	(13)
2013–2014	→ Deportivo Cali (loan)	39	(8)
2014–2015	Once Caldas	31	(11)
2015	Millonarios	11	(0)
2016	Alianza Petrolera	20	(12)
2016–2017	Once Caldas	32	(7)
2017–2019	Atlético Bucaramanga	73	(14)
2020	Jaguares de Córdoba	19	(3)
- * Club domestic league appearances and goals as of 20:29, 24 January 2021 (UTC)

Sergio Romero (born 22 November 1988) is a Colombian professional footballer who plays as forward.
