= Jairo Ampudia =

Colombian footballer (born 1966)

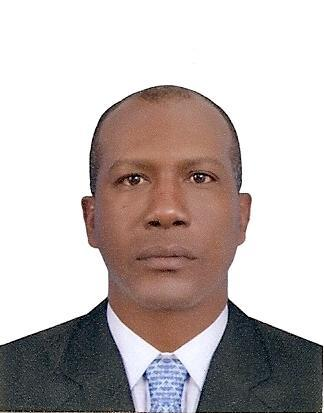

Personal information
- Full name: Jairo Aurelio Ampudia Perea
- Date of birth: 14 February 1966 (age 60)
- Place of birth: Cali, Colombia
- Height: 1.82 m (6 ft 0 in)
- Position: Defender

Senior career*
Years	Team	Apps	(Gls)
1985–1990	América de Cali		
1991	Unión Magdalena		
1992	Atlético Bucaramanga		
1992	Millonarios		
1993	América de Cali		
1994	Cúcuta Deportivo		
1995	Cortuluá		
1995–1996	Atlético Junior		
1996–1998	Cortuluá		
1998	Deportivo Cali		

International career
1997	Colombia	2	(0)
- * Club domestic league appearances and goals

Jairo Aurelio Ampudia Perea (born 14 February 1966) is a Colombian former footballer who played as a defender.

== Career ==
Born in Cali, Ampudia played for América de Cali, Unión Magdalena, Atlético Bucaramanga, Millonarios, Cúcuta Deportivo, Cortuluá, Atlético Junior and Deportivo Cali.

He made two international appearances for Colombia, in 1997.
