= Leonardo Mina =

Colombian footballer (born 1977)

Personal information
- Full name: Leonardo Mina Polo
- Date of birth: 5 January 1977 (age 49)
- Place of birth: Buenaventura, Colombia
- Height: 1.77 m (5 ft 10 in)
- Position: Forward

Senior career*
Years	Team	Apps	(Gls)
1999	Expreso Palmira	0	(0)
1999	Deportivo Cali	17	(4)
2000	Alianza Lima	0	(0)
2001–2002	Deportivo Cali	45	(19)
2002	Club Atlético Colón	11	(0)
2003	Atlético Nacional	6	(0)
2003	Aucas	14	(2)
2004	Cortuluá	31	(8)
2005	América de Cali	12	(2)
2005	Deportes Tolima	17	(7)
2006	Cúcuta Deportivo	13	(4)
2006	Deportes Quindío	11	(2)
2007	Atlético Junior	6	(1)
2007	América de Cali	10	(0)
2008	Atlético Bucaramanga	14	(1)
2009	América de Cali	1	(0)
2010	Inti Gas Deportes	39	(22)
2011	Cobresol FBC	19	(2)

International career
2001	Colombia	1	(0)
- * Club domestic league appearances and goals

Leonardo Mina Polo (born 5 January 1977) is a Colombian former professional footballer who played as a forward.
