= Paulo César Arango =

Colombian footballer (born 1984)

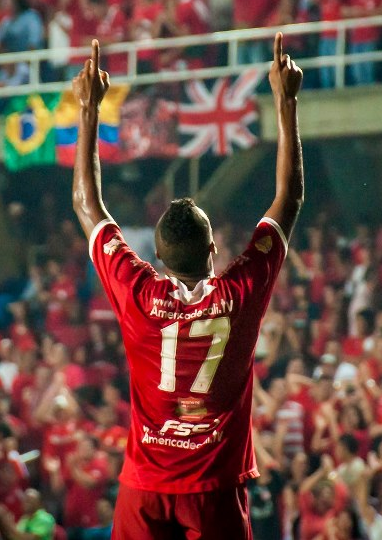

Personal information
- Full name: Paulo César Arango Ambuila
- Date of birth: August 27, 1984 (age 42)
- Place of birth: Palmira, Valle del Cauca, Colombia
- Height: 1.83 m (6 ft 0 in)
- Position: Midfielder

Team information
- Current team: Caracas

Youth career
- América de Cali

Senior career*
Years	Team	Apps	(Gls)
1997–2000	América de Cali	1	(0)
2001–2004	Real Cartagena	12	(1)
2005	América de Cali	31	(1)
2006	Envigado	11	(0)
2007–2009	América de Cali	94	(19)
2010	Atlético Junior	21	(2)
2011–2013	América de Cali	45	(15)
2014	La Equidad	27	(2)
2015	Atlético Bucaramanga	22	(4)
2016–	Caracas	14	(3)

International career^{‡}
2008	Colombia	2	(0)
- * Club domestic league appearances and goals as of 18 April 2016 ‡ National team caps and goals as of 20 May 2008

Paulo César Arango Ambuila is a retired Colombian midfielder, who last played for Caracas in the Venezuelan Primera Division.
