= Carlos Rodas =

Colombian footballer (born 1975)

Personal information
- Full name: Carlos Andrés Rodas Montoya
- Date of birth: February 4, 1975 (age 51)
- Place of birth: Tuluá, Colombia
- Height: 1.85 m (6 ft 1 in)
- Position: Forward

Team information
- Current team: Cortuluá

Senior career*
Years	Team	Apps	(Gls)
1994–1996	Cortuluá	?	(19)
1996–1997	Deportivo Pereira	?	(10)
1998	Deportes Quindío	?	(2)
1999–2000	Once Caldas	69	(11)
2001	Independiente Medellín	20	(5)
2001	Deportes Tolima	18	(2)
2002	Atlético Huila	6	(0)
2005	Cortuluá	16	(5)
2006–2007	→ Deportivo Pasto (loan)	49	(15)
2007–2008	→ Once Caldas (loan)	25	(2)
2008–2010	Deportes Quindío	56	(19)
2011	Deportivo Pereira	14	(2)
2011–2015	Cortuluá	129	(55)

International career^{‡}
1997	Colombia	1	(0)
- * Club domestic league appearances and goals as of 31 January 2016 ‡ National team caps and goals as of 12 November 2012

Carlos Rodas is a Colombian football forward. He currently plays for Cortuluá.

After beginning his career in 1994, quitting in 2002 to become a taxi driver, and then returning to the game, he came off the bench to score a free-kick at the age of 40 to help Cortuluá beat Junior F.C. for the first time in 11 years.
