= Nilson Cortes =

Colombian former football striker (born 1977)

Nilson Cortez
Personal information
- Full name: Nilson Armes Cortes
- Date of birth: 29 March 1977 (age 49)
- Place of birth: Barranquilla, Colombia
- Height: 1.77 m (5 ft 10 in)
- Position: Midfielder

Team information
- Current team: Once Caldas

Senior career*
Years	Team	Apps	(Gls)
- Girardot
- Independiente Santa Fe
- Millonarios
2004–2007	Boyacá Chicó	132	(2)
2007–2009	Once Caldas	78	(0)

International career^{‡}
2008	Colombia	1	(0)
- * Club domestic league appearances and goals as of 1 January 2008 ‡ National team caps and goals as of 20 May 2008

Nilson Armes Cortes (born 29 March 1977) is a retired Colombian football striker. At club level he most recently (2007–2009) played for Once Caldas in the Copa Mustang. In 2008, he was called up for a friendly game against Venezuela.
