= Sucre F.C. =

Colombian football club

- Full name: Sucre Fútbol Club
- Founded: 2011 (relocation of Pacífico F.C.)
- Dissolved: 2012 (became Jaguares de Córdoba)
- Ground: Estadio Arturo Cumplido Sierra; Sincelejo, Colombia
- Capacity: 15 000
- Chairman: Nelson Soto Duque
- Manager: César Maturana
- League: Categoría Primera B
- 2012: None
Home colours	Away colours

Sucre Fútbol Club was a Colombian football team, based in Sincelejo. The club was formerly known as Girardot F.C. based in Girardot, which then moved to Palmira becoming Deportes Palmira but due to financial difficulties, the club relocated to Buenaventura and was rebranded as Pacífico F.C. The club only lasted less than two years after it was moved again and became Sucre F.C. Sucre lasted less than a year before it was moved yet again, becoming Jaguares de Córdoba.
