= Pacífico F.C. =

Colombian football club

- Full name: Pacífico Fútbol Club
- Founded: 2010, January 20 (relocation of Deportes Palmira)
- Dissolved: 2011, December 13 (became Sucre F.C.)
- Ground: Polideportivo El Cristal, Buenaventura, Colombia
- Capacity: 3000
- Chairman: Nelson Soto Duque
- League: Categoría Primera B
- 2010: None

Pacífico F.C. was a Colombian football (soccer) team, based in Buenaventura, Valle del Cauca, Colombia. The club was founded in 2010 and played in Categoría Primera B. The club was formerly known as Girardot F.C. based in Girardot, which then moved to Palmira becoming Deportes Palmira but due to financial difficulties, the club relocated to Buenaventura and was rebranded as Pacífico F.C. The club only lasted less than two years after it was moved again and became Sucre F.C.
