= 2013 Categoría Primera A season =

Liga Postobón
- Season: 2013
- Champions: Apertura: Atlético Nacional (12th title); Finalización: Atlético Nacional (13th title)
- Relegated: Cúcuta Deportivo; Deportes Quindío
- Copa Libertadores: Atlético Nacional; Deportivo Cali; Santa Fe
- Copa Sudamericana: Atlético Nacional (cup winner); Deportivo Cali (Superliga winner); Millonarios; Itagüí
- Top goalscorer: Apertura: Wilder Medina (12 goals); Finalización: Dayro Moreno; Luis Carlos Ruiz (16 goals each)

The 2013 Categoría Primera A season (officially known as the 2013 Liga Postobón season for sponsorship reasons) was the 66th season of Colombia's top-flight football league. Millonarios came in as the defending champions having won the title in the 2012 Finalización.

== Format ==
Both the Apertura and Finalización had an identical format. Each championship was divided into three stages. The First Stage was contested on a home-and-away basis, with each team playing the other teams once and playing a regional rival once more. The top eight teams after eighteen rounds advanced to a semifinal round, of two groups of four playing once more on a home-and-away basis. The winner of each semifinal group advanced to the final of the tournament, which was played as a double-legged series. The winner of the final was declared the tournament champion and participated in the 2014 Copa Libertadores.

== Teams ==
Locations of the 2013 Primera A teams

Team	City	Stadium	2012 season
Alianza Petrolera	Barrancabermeja	Daniel Villa Zapata	Primera B champions
Atlético Huila	Neiva	Guillermo Plazas Alcid	14th
Atlético Nacional	Medellín	Atanasio Girardot	8th
Boyacá Chicó	Tunja	La Independencia	10th
Cúcuta Deportivo	Cúcuta	General Santander	16th
Deportes Quindío	Armenia	Centenario	15th
Deportes Tolima	Ibagué	Manuel Murillo Toro	1st
Deportivo Cali	Cali	Pascual Guerrero	9th
Deportivo Pasto	Pasto	Departamental Libertad	3rd
Envigado	Envigado	Polideportivo Sur	12th
Independiente Medellín	Medellín	Atanasio Girardot	11th
Itagüí	Itagüí	Ciudad de Itagüí	4th
Junior	Barranquilla	Metropolitano	7th
La Equidad	Bogotá	Metropolitano de Techo	2nd
Millonarios	Bogotá	Nemesio Camacho	6th
Once Caldas	Manizales	Palogrande	17th
Patriotas	Tunja	La Independencia	13th
Santa Fe	Bogotá	Nemesio Camacho	5th

== Torneo Apertura ==
=== First stage ===
The First Stage began in January and consisted of eighteen rounds and a series of regional rivalries on the ninth round. The top eight teams out of this stage advanced to the Semifinals. The first stage ended in May.

==== Standings ====
Pos	Team	Pld	W	D	L	GF	GA	GD	Pts	Qualification
1	Santa Fe	18	9	6	3	32	25	+7	33	Advanced to the Semifinals
2	Atlético Nacional	18	8	8	2	29	22	+7	32	Advanced to the Semifinals
3	Itagüí	18	8	7	3	27	17	+10	31	Advanced to the Semifinals
4	Deportivo Cali	18	7	9	2	31	21	+10	30	Advanced to the Semifinals
5	Deportes Tolima	18	8	5	5	31	23	+8	29	Advanced to the Semifinals
6	Millonarios	18	8	4	6	26	18	+8	28	Advanced to the Semifinals
7	Once Caldas	18	7	7	4	23	17	+6	28	Advanced to the Semifinals
8	Deportivo Pasto	18	6	8	4	21	25	−4	26	Advanced to the Semifinals
9	Cúcuta Deportivo	18	6	5	7	23	20	+3	23	
10	Independiente Medellín	18	6	5	7	18	18	0	23	
11	La Equidad	18	5	7	6	16	15	+1	22	
12	Junior	18	6	4	8	24	25	−1	22	
13	Atlético Huila	18	4	8	6	19	23	−4	20	
14	Alianza Petrolera	18	5	5	8	19	28	−9	20	
15	Boyacá Chicó	18	4	7	7	27	31	−4	19	
16	Envigado	18	4	5	9	15	25	−10	17	
17	Deportes Quindío	18	2	7	9	8	24	−16	13	
18	Patriotas	18	0	11	7	14	26	−12	11	

Rules for classification: 1st points; 2nd goal difference; 3rd goals scored; 4th away goals scored; 5th away goals against; 6th draw.

==== Results ====
Home \ Away	APE	HUI	NAC	BOY	CUC	QUI	TOL	CAL	PAS	ENV	DIM	ITA	JUN	EQU	MIL	ONC	PAT	SFE
Alianza Petrolera		1–0		3–1	2–3				1–1	1–2	0–1			0–0		1–1		0–3
Atlético Huila							2–2		6–1		3–2	1–1	1–1		0–0	0–1	1–0	1–1
Atlético Nacional	4–0	3–0							1–0		2–2	1–1	2–1		2–1	2–1	3–3	
Boyacá Chicó		2–1	2–3			1–1	3–0	1–2	2–2	2–0				2–2			0–0	
Cúcuta Deportivo		1–1	1–1	0–1		2–0	2–1	0–0		3–0			1–2	0–1				
Deportes Quindío	2–3	0–0	0–0						0–1		0–2		0–1		0–0	1–1	0–0	
Deportes Tolima	2–1	2–0	4–0			2–0		2–2	3–0		1–0				1–2	2–2		
Deportivo Cali	2–2	0–1	1–1			4–0			2–2		2–0		2–2		2–2	2–1		
Deportivo Pasto					2–1			1–2			1–0	1–1	1–0		2–1	1–1	3–2	1–1
Envigado		1–1	3–0			0–1	2–2	1–2	1–1			1–2		1–0		0–2		
Independiente Medellín			0–0	3–1	1–1					0–1		1–0	1–0		0–0		2–1	2–2
Itagüí	3–0			3–0	0–0	1–1	3–2	0–3		1–1				1–0				4–0
Junior	2–1			2–2	0–2		1–2			4–0		3–2		0–0			2–0	2–3
La Equidad	0–1	4–0	0–2			3–0	1–0	1–1	0–0		1–0					0–0		
Millonarios	1–2			2–1	2–1					1–0		1–2	3–0	3–1			4–1	0–1
Once Caldas				2–2	2–0	1–2					2–1	1–2	2–1		1–0		2–0	0–0
Patriotas	0–0			1–1	1–3		1–1	1–1		1–1		0–0		1–1				1–1
Santa Fe			2–2	4–3	3–2	2–0	1–2	3–1		1–0				3–1	1–3			

Legend: Blue = home team win; Yellow = draw; Red = away team win.

=== Semifinals ===
The Semifinal stage began on June 15 and ended on July 7. The eight teams that advanced were sorted into two groups of four teams. The winner of each group advanced to the finals.

==== Group A ====
Pos	Team	Pld	W	D	L	GF	GA	GD	Pts	Qualification	SFE	MIL	CAL	ONC
1	Santa Fe	6	3	2	1	7	5	+2	11	Advances to the Finals		1–0	1–1	1–0
2	Millonarios	6	3	1	2	10	8	+2	10		2–1		1–1	4–2
3	Deportivo Cali	6	1	4	1	6	6	0	7		1–1	1–0		1–2
4	Once Caldas	6	1	1	4	8	12	−4	4		1–2	2–3	1–1	

Legend: Blue = home team win; Yellow = draw; Red = away team win.
Rules for classification: 1st points; 2nd first stage position.

==== Group B ====
Pos	Team	Pld	W	D	L	GF	GA	GD	Pts	Qualification	NAC	ITA	TOL	PAS
1	Atlético Nacional	6	3	1	2	9	8	+1	10	Advanced to the Finals		1–2	1–1	2–1
2	Itagüí	6	3	0	3	8	9	−1	9		1–2		1–3	2–3
3	Deportes Tolima	6	2	2	2	8	7	+1	8		1–2	0–1		2–1
4	Deportivo Pasto	6	2	1	3	8	9	−1	7		2–1	0–1	1–1	

Legend: Blue = home team win; Yellow = draw; Red = away team win.
Rules for classification: 1st points; 2nd first stage position.

=== Finals ===
Pos	Team	Pld	W	D	L	GF	GA	GD	Pts	Qualification
1	Atlético Nacional	2	1	1	0	2	0	+2	4	2014 Copa Libertadores Second Stage
2	Santa Fe	2	0	1	1	0	2	−2	1	

Rules for classification: 1st points; 2nd goal difference; 3rd penalty shoot-out.

=== Top goalscorers ===
Rank	Name	Club	Goals
1	(Colombia) Wilder Medina	Santa Fe	12
2	(Colombia) Edison Toloza	Junior	10
3	(Colombia) Víctor Cortés	Itagüí Ditaires	9
4	(Colombia) Edwards Jiménez	Once Caldas	8
4	(Colombia) Charles Monsalvo	Deportes Tolima	8
4	(Colombia) Fredy Montero	Millonarios	8

Source: DIMAYOR

== Torneo Finalización ==
=== First stage ===
==== Standings ====
Pos	Team	Pld	W	D	L	GF	GA	GD	Pts	Qualification
1	Atlético Nacional	18	11	4	3	30	12	+18	37	Advanced to the Semifinals
2	Millonarios	18	8	7	3	28	18	+10	31	Advanced to the Semifinals
3	Junior	18	8	6	4	29	24	+5	30	Advanced to the Semifinals
4	Deportivo Cali	18	7	7	4	22	13	+9	28	Advanced to the Semifinals
5	Once Caldas	18	8	4	6	24	17	+7	28	Advanced to the Semifinals
6	Santa Fe	18	7	7	4	24	17	+7	28	Advanced to the Semifinals
7	Deportivo Pasto	18	6	9	3	21	20	+1	27	Advanced to the Semifinals
8	Itagüí	18	8	3	7	20	20	0	27	Advanced to the Semifinals
9	Independiente Medellín	18	6	6	6	24	20	+4	24	
10	La Equidad	18	5	8	5	24	21	+3	23	
11	Patriotas	18	5	8	5	17	17	0	23	
12	Envigado	18	5	7	6	17	22	−5	22	
13	Deportes Tolima	18	4	9	5	19	23	−4	21	
14	Atlético Huila	18	5	5	8	24	30	−6	20	
15	Alianza Petrolera	18	4	6	8	14	24	−10	18	
16	Cúcuta Deportivo	18	4	4	10	19	27	−8	16	
17	Boyacá Chicó	18	3	6	9	21	29	−8	15	
18	Deportes Quindío	18	4	2	12	10	33	−23	14	

==== Results ====
Home \ Away	AP	HUI	NAC	BOY	CUC	QUI	TOL	CAL	PAS	ENV	DIM	ITA	JUN	EQU	MIL	ONC	PAT	SFE
Alianza Petrolera			1–2			1–1	2–1	0–2				1–0	1–1	1–2	0–1		0–0	
Atlético Huila	2–0		2–3	2–1	2–2	1–1	1–1	1–0		2–1				1–1				
Atlético Nacional				0–1	1–2	2–1	2–0	2–0		4–1	3–0			0–0				1–1
Boyacá Chicó	1–2				3–1						3–1	0–2	1–1		1–1	0–1	0–0	0–2
Cúcuta Deportivo	2–0								0–1		0–1	1–2	1–5		0–1	0–0	2–3	1–0
Deportes Quindío				2–1	0–3		1–0	0–5		1–2		0–2		1–0		2–1		0–2
Deportes Tolima		1–0		1–1	2–1					1–0		1–1	3–3	3–1			1–1	1–1
Deportivo Cali				1–1	2–1		0–0		0–0	1–1		1–0		1–0			1–1	2–0
Deportivo Pasto	2–1	2–2	1–1	4–3		1–0	1–1	1–1		0–0				4–1				
Envigado	0–0			2–2	2–0						0–4	1–1	0–1		2–1		1–1	2–1
Independiente Medellín	0–1	4–0	1–1			1–0	1–1	3–1	0–0					2–1		1–2		
Itagüí		1–0	0–4						1–0	0–1	1–0		4–0		2–2	0–4	2–0	
Junior		2–1	0–1		1–1	3–0		1–1	0–1		3–2				3–2	1–0		
La Equidad	4–0			5–2	0–0					0–0		2–0	2–2		1–1		1–0	1–1
Millonarios		3–2	0–2			2–0	2–1	1–0	4–0		2–2					3–0		0–0
Once Caldas	1–1	2–0	0–1			3–0	4–0	0–3	1–1	2–1				2–2				
Patriotas		2–1	1–0	1–0		3–0			1–1		0–0		0–2		2–2	0–1		
Santa Fe	2–2	3–4							2–0		1–1	2–1	3–0		0–0	1–0	2–1	

Legend: Blue = home team win; Yellow = draw; Red = away team win.

=== Semifinals ===
The Semifinal stage began on November 16 and will end on December 8. The eight teams that advanced were sorted into two groups of four teams. The winner of each group will advance to the finals.

==== Group A ====
Pos	Team	Pld	W	D	L	GF	GA	GD	Pts	Qualification	NAC	JUN	SFE	ITA
1	Atlético Nacional	6	5	1	0	13	4	+9	16	Advances to the Finals		2–1	2–1	3–2
2	Junior	6	3	1	2	10	7	+3	10		0–0		3–2	4–1
3	Santa Fe	6	2	0	4	7	11	−4	6		0–2	2–1		0–2
4	Itagüí	6	1	0	5	6	14	−8	3		0–4	0–1	1–2	

Legend: Blue = home team win; Yellow = draw; Red = away team win.
Rules for classification: 1st points; 2nd first stage position.

==== Group B ====
Pos	Team	Pld	W	D	L	GF	GA	GD	Pts	Qualification	CAL	PAS	MIL	ONC
1	Deportivo Cali	6	5	0	1	13	8	+5	15	Advances to the Finals		3–2	4–2	1–0
2	Deportivo Pasto	6	3	0	3	12	12	0	9		3–2		4–1	2–1
3	Millonarios	6	2	0	4	9	12	−3	6		0–1	2–0		3–1
4	Once Caldas	6	2	0	4	8	10	−2	6		1–2	3–1	2–1	

Legend: Blue = home team win; Yellow = draw; Red = away team win.
Rules for classification: 1st points; 2nd first stage position.

=== Finals ===
Pos	Team	Pld	W	D	L	GF	GA	GD	Pts	Qualification
1	Atlético Nacional	2	1	1	0	2	0	+2	4	2014 Copa Libertadores Second Stage
2	Deportivo Cali	2	0	1	1	0	2	−2	1	

Rules for classification: Rules for classification: 1st points; 2nd goal difference; 3rd penalty shoot-out.
December 11, 2013

Deportivo Cali	0–0	Atlético Nacional

Estadio Pascual Guerrero, Cali
Referee: Wilson Lamoroux

December 15, 2013

Atlético Nacional	2–0	Deportivo Cali

Estadio Atanasio Girardot, Medellín

=== Top goalscorers ===
Rank	Name	Club	Goals
1	(Colombia) Dayro Moreno	Millonarios	16
1	(Colombia) Luis Carlos Ruiz	Junior	16
3	(Colombia) Wilson Morelo	La Equidad	11
4	(Colombia) Sergio Herrera	Once Caldas	10
5	(Colombia) Luis Páez	Atlético Huila	9

Source: DIMAYOR

== Relegation ==
A separate table is kept to determine the teams that get relegated to the Categoría Primera B for the next season. The table includes an average of all first stage games played for the current season and the previous two seasons.

Pos	Team	2011 Pts	2012 Pts	2013 Pts	Total Pts	Total Pld	Avg	Relegation
1	Atlético Nacional	55	52	69	176	108	1.63	
2	Itagüí	54	61	58	173	108	1.602	
3	Millonarios	56	57	59	172	108	1.593	
4	Deportes Tolima	56	65	50	171	108	1.583	
5	Santa Fe	49	52	61	162	108	1.5	
6	Junior	50	57	52	159	108	1.472	
7	Deportivo Cali	50	49	58	157	108	1.454	
8	Once Caldas	65	33	56	154	108	1.426	
9	La Equidad	45	61	45	151	108	1.398	
10	Deportivo Pasto	41	52	53	146	108	1.352	
11	Envigado	60	44	39	143	108	1.324	
12	Boyacá Chicó	51	49	34	134	108	1.241	
13	Independiente Medellín	37	43	47	127	108	1.176	
14	Patriotas	42	44	34	120	108	1.111	
15	Atlético Huila	39	41	40	120	108	1.111	
16	Alianza Petrolera	39	41	38	118	108	1.093	
17	Cúcuta Deportivo (R)	41	35	39	115	108	1.065	Relegation/promotion playoff
18	Deportes Quindío (R)	47	40	27	114	108	1.056	Categoría Primera B

Rules for classification: 1st average; 2nd goal difference; 3rd number of goals scored; 4th away goals scored.

== Aggregate table ==
An aggregate table including all games that a team plays during the year is used to determine First Stage berths to both the Copa Libertadores and the Copa Sudamericana. The best-placed non-champion will go to the first stage of the 2014 Copa Libertadores and the 2nd and 3rd best-placed non-champions will go to the first stage of the 2014 Copa Sudamericana.

Pos	Team	Pld	W	D	L	GF	GA	GD	Pts	Qualification
1	Atlético Nacional (C)	52	29	16	7	84	46	+38	103	2014 Copa Libertadores Second Stage and 2014 Copa Sudamericana First Stage (Note: Atlético Nacional are qualified for the 2014 Copa Libertadores as the Apertura and Finalización champions. Atlético Nacional are qualified for the 2014 Copa Sudamericana as the 2013 Copa Colombia champion.)
2	Deportivo Cali	50	20	21	9	72	50	+22	81	2014 Copa Libertadores Second Stage and 2014 Copa Sudamericana First Stage (Note: Deportivo Cali are qualified for the 2014 Copa Sudamericana as the 2014 Superliga Colombiana champion.)
3	Santa Fe	50	21	16	13	70	60	+10	79	2014 Copa Libertadores First Stage
4	Millonarios	48	21	12	15	73	56	+17	75	2014 Copa Sudamericana First Stage
5	Itagüí	48	20	10	18	61	60	+1	70	2014 Copa Sudamericana First Stage
6	Deportivo Pasto	48	17	18	13	62	66	−4	69	
7	Once Caldas	48	18	12	18	63	56	+7	66	
8	Junior	42	17	11	14	63	56	+7	62	
9	Deportes Tolima	42	14	16	12	58	53	+5	58	
10	Independiente Medellín	36	12	11	13	42	37	+5	47	
11	La Equidad	36	10	15	11	40	36	+4	45	
12	Atlético Huila	36	9	13	14	43	53	−10	40	
13	Cúcuta Deportivo	36	10	9	17	42	47	−5	39	
14	Envigado	36	9	12	15	32	47	−15	39	
15	Alianza Petrolera	36	9	11	16	33	52	−19	38	
16	Boyacá Chicó	36	7	13	16	48	60	−12	34	
17	Patriotas	36	5	19	12	31	43	−12	34	
18	Deportes Quindío	36	6	9	21	18	57	−39	27	

(C) Champions
