= Deportes Palmira =

Colombian football club

- Full name: Deportes Palmira
- Founded: 2009 (relocation of Girardot F.C.)
- Dissolved: 2010 (became Pacífico F.C.)
- Ground: Estadio Francisco Rivera Escobar; Palmira, Colombia
- Capacity: 9,000
- Chairman: Nelson Soto Duque
- Manager: Carlos Enrique Estrada
- League: Categoría Primera B
- None

Deportes Palmira was a Colombian football (soccer) team, based in Palmira. The club was founded in 2009 and played in Categoría Primera B. The club was formerly known as Girardot F.C. based in Girardot but due to financial difficulties, the club relocated to Buenaventura and was rebranded as Pacífico F.C..
