= Alianza Petrolera F.C. =

Colombian football club

Alianza Petrolera
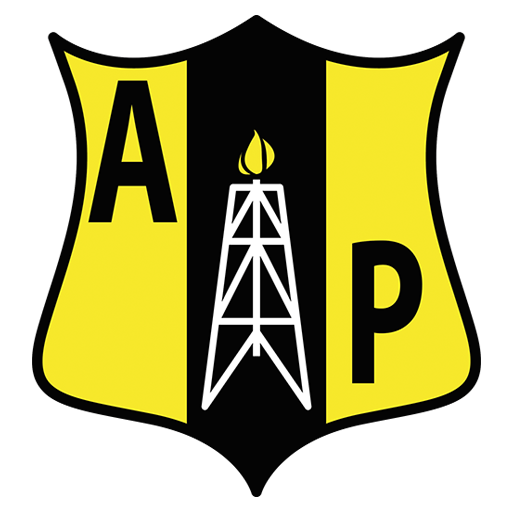
- Full name: Alianza Petrolera Fútbol Club
- Nicknames: La Máquina Amarilla; Aurinegros; Petroleros; Refineros
- Founded: 24 October 1990; 35 years ago
- Dissolved: 16 January 2024; 2 years ago
- Ground: Estadio Daniel Villa Zapata
- Capacity: 10,400
- Chairman: Carlos Ferreira
- League: Categoría Primera A
- 2023: Primera A, 8th of 20
- Website: www.alianzapetrolerafc.com
Home colours	Away colours	Third colours

Alianza Petrolera Fútbol Club was a Colombian professional football team based in Barrancabermeja, Santander, that last played in the Categoría Primera A. The club was founded in 1991 and played in the Categoría Primera B until 2012. They played their home games at the Daniel Villa Zapata stadium. They also played home matches in the town of Guarne, Antioquia, in Yopal, Casanare and in Floridablanca.

The club was dissolved in January 2024, with Alianza F.C. taking their place.

== History ==
Alianza Petrolera was founded on 24 October 1990, entering the second-tier competition Categoría Primera B where they played from 1992 to 2012. They enjoyed a significant run of success between 1998 and 2004, finishing as runners-up in 2002. However, their fortunes changed after that and by 2009 the club was on the verge of folding.

In the 2009 Apertura, they performed dismally, earning just five points and not winning a single game. The club was short on sponsors, coaches, and players, and their participation in the Finalizacion seemed doubtful. They managed to compete, but finished dead last. In early 2011, Alianza Petrolera signed a partnership deal with Atlético Nacional that would net them players and coaching staff on loan, with much of the wages covered by the latter team.

This new arrangement revitalized the club, which qualified for the finals of the "Torneo Finalización" in 2012. This earned them a berth in the final against Deportivo Rionegro. Alianza prevailed, winning the first leg 1–0 and the second leg 3–1. That earned them a spot in the season final against América de Cali, with promotion on the line. The first leg ended 2–1 in favor of Alianza, but the second leg ended 1–0 in favor of América de Cali. The series went to penalty kicks, where Alianza Petrolera prevailed and earned promotion to the top flight for the very first time.

Alianza has not been relegated back since. Their best campaign in the top flight was in the 2015 Finalización tournament. During the first stage, the club enjoyed a consistent performance, leading the table for some rounds of the tournament and ending in sixth place with 33 points, which allowed them to qualify for the knockout stages for the first time, losing to Independiente Medellín in the quarterfinals.

After finishing in eighth place in the aggregate table of the 2023 Categoría Primera A season, Alianza Petrolera qualified for their first international competition, the 2024 Copa Sudamericana. However, on 16 January 2024 the club announced their departure from Barrancabermeja due to the lack of financial support from local authorities, accepting a proposal from the city of Valledupar to move there. With the move to Valledupar, the club was also rebranded to Alianza F.C., dropping its colors and the word Petrolera from their name, and adopting as new colors those representative of their new hometown. Consequently, its successor club Alianza F.C. inherited the Copa Sudamericana berth earned by Alianza Petrolera.

== Honours ==
- Categoría Primera B
  - Winners (1): 2012

== Players ==
=== Records ===
==== Most capped players ====
Source: BDFA

R	Player	P	Career	App.
1	(Colombia) David Valencia	DF	2011–2015	131
2	(Colombia) Rafael Carrascal	MF	2012–2015	130
3	(Guatemala) Ricardo Jérez Jr.	GK	2013–	107
4	(Colombia) Juan Guillermo Arboleda	MF	2012, 2013–	105
5	(Colombia) Ricardo Peñaloza	MF	2007–2011	88
6	(Colombia) Jorge "La Araña" Henríquez	GK	2009–2011, 2012–2014	82
7	(Colombia) Víctor Castillo	MF	2013–	77
8	(Colombia) Dairon Asprilla	FW	2012–2014	72
9	(Colombia) Deivy Balanta	MF	2012–2015	71
10	(Colombia) Leonardo Torres	DF	2006, 2009–2011	69

Last updated on: 20 May 2016

==== Top scorers ====
Source: BDFA

R	Player	P	Career	G.
1	(Colombia) Sergio "Barranca" Herrera	FW	1999, 2003	25
2	(Colombia) Dairon Asprilla	FW	2012–2014	22
3	(Colombia) Ayron del Valle	FW	2014	15
4	(Colombia) Michael Rangel	FW	2012–2013	14
4	(Colombia) Andrés Rentería	FW	2012	14
6	(Colombia) Yeison Devoz	FW	2006, 2011–2012	13
7	(Colombia) César Arias	FW	2006–2008	12
8	(Colombia) Cristian Palomeque	MF	2012–2013	11
9	(Colombia) Jorge Romaña	FW	2006	10
9	(Colombia) Edinson Palomino	FW	2007–2008	10

Last updated on: 20 May 2016

=== Notable players ===
List of call-ups to national teams:

- (Guatemala) Ricardo Jérez Jr. (2013–2017), (2017–2021)
- (Panama) Nelson Barahona (2014)

== Managers ==
- (Colombia) José de Jesús Vega (1998)
- (Colombia) José Suárez (1999)
- (Colombia) Fernando Valderrama (2000–2001)
- (Colombia) Adolfo León Holguín (2002)
- (Colombia) Alexis Mendoza (2003)
- (Colombia) Juan Carlos Bedoya (2004)
- (Colombia) Adolfo León Holguín (2005)
- (Colombia) Felipe Merino (2006)
- (Colombia) Adolfo León Holguín (2006)
- (Argentina) Jorge Ramoa (2007)
- (Colombia) Didier Luna (2008)
- (Colombia) Oscar Upegui (2008)
- (Colombia) Carlos Estrada (2009)
- (Colombia) Henry Barón (2010)
- (Colombia) Héctor Estrada (2011–2013)
- (Colombia) Guillermo "El Teacher" Berrío (2013)
- (Colombia) Adolfo León Holguín (2014)
- (Colombia) Oscar Upegui (2015–2016)
- (Colombia) Edgar Moreno (2016)
- (Colombia) Jorge Luis Bernal (2016–2017)
- (Argentina) Juan Cruz Real (2017–2018)
- (Colombia) César Torres (2018–2020)
- (Colombia) Wilson Gutiérrez (2021)
- (Colombia) Hubert Bodhert (2021–2023)
- (Colombia) César Torres (2023)

Source: Worldfootball.net
