= Cortuluá =

Association football club in Colombia

- Full name: Cortuluá Fútbol Club S.A.
- Nicknames: El Equipo Corazón (The Heart Team; from the city of Tuluá's own nickname El Corazón del Valle - or The Valley's Heart); Los Paneleros (The Paneleros)
- Founded: 16 October 1967; 58 years ago as Corporación Club Deportivo Tuluá
- Dissolved: 10 January 2024; 2 years ago
- Ground: Estadio Municipal Raúl Miranda; Yumbo, Colombia
- Capacity: 3,500
- President: Oscar Arturo Martán
- Head coach: Jorge Edier Peralta
- League: Categoría Primera B
- 2023: Primera B, 7th of 16
- Website: cortulua.co
Home colours	Away colours	Third colours

Cortuluá, officially named Cortuluá Fútbol Club S. A. and previously known as Corporación Club Deportivo Tuluá for short, was a Colombian football club from Tuluá, Valle del Cauca Department. It was founded in 1967 and last played in Categoría Primera B, the second-tier competition of Colombian football.

In the 2001 Categoría Primera A season the team had its most successful campaign after winning the Apertura tournament, which granted them a spot in the 2002 Copa Libertadores.

== History ==
Cortuluá was founded in 1967 by a group of people headed by Paraguayan former player and coach Hernando Acosta, and entered Categoría Primera B for its first season in 1991. In 1993, Cortuluá won its first title in the Categoría Primera B, being promoted to the Primera A for the following year. Its first game in the top flight was on 26 February 1994 at the Estadio Hernando Martinez Azcárate of nearby Buga against Envigado.

In the 2001 Copa Mustang Cortuluá won the Torneo Apertura (which at that time did not yet award a championship) and qualified for the 2002 Copa Libertadores. However, in 2004 the team were relegated to the Categoría Primera B.

In 2006, the United States Treasury identified the football club as one of ten businesses allegedly operating on behalf of one of the most wanted Colombian drug barons, Carlos Alberto Renteria Mantilla. The move by the United States authorities placed a freeze on any assets owned by the club within the United States, and prevented United States residents from having dealings with the club. Cortuluá was removed from the Specially Designated Nationals and Blocked Persons List (also known as the Clinton List) on 24 May 2012.

After five years in the Categoría Primera B, the club was promoted back to the Categoría Primera A in 2009. Cortuluá qualified for the final of the "Torneo Apertura", surpassing Deportes Palmira, Deportivo Rionegro, and Atlético Bucaramanga in Group A of the semi-finals. In the final instance against Itagüí Ditaires, the first leg ended 3–1 with a win for Cortuluá, but it lost 2–0 in the second leg. In the penalty shootout Cortuluá won 6–5, thus winning the "Torneo Apertura" and qualifying to the Final of the year, where Cortuluá defeated Atlético Bucaramanga and returned to the top tier for the following season.

In the 2010 season, the team were relegated again and returned to the second division, where they played for four seasons until the 2015 season, when they were once again promoted in a special tournament played to increase the size of the Categoría Primera A to 20 teams. They came on top of Group B, ahead of Unión Magdalena, pre-tournament favorites América de Cali, and Deportivo Pereira and thus earned promotion for the 2015 season. In 2016, its reserve team placed third in the U-20 Copa Libertadores. On the final matchday of the first round of the 2017 Torneo Finalización, Cortuluá were once again relegated to the Primera B, after losing 2–1 to Once Caldas in Manizales with a last-minute goal.

After four years in the second tier, Cortuluá were able to return to Primera A at the end of the 2021 season, winning their semi-final group to clinch one of the two promotion spots. However, they were immediately relegated back to Primera B after a poor campaign that saw them end in last place of the relegation table of the 2022 Primera A. Their relegation was confirmed on 16 October 2022, following a 1–0 home defeat to Deportes Tolima.

=== Departure from Tuluá and rebranding ===
Following the team's relegation from Primera A, the club's owner Ignacio Martán announced his intention to move Cortuluá out of its hometown, citing the lack of financial support from successive local administrations. On 14 December 2022 the General Assembly of DIMAYOR approved Cortuluá's proposal to move their home matches from Tuluá to Yumbo, Valle del Cauca Department, starting from 2023. The team played its matches in the 2023 Primera B tournament in Yumbo, planning to rebrand to Yumbo Industriales F.C. within six months, however, this proposed change did not materialize.

At the end of 2023 Cortuluá requested another change of home stadium, planning to move to Palmira. The request was approved by DIMAYOR on 12 December 2023. The club was ultimately rebranded as Internacional F.C. de Palmira on 10 January 2024.

== Stadium ==
Estadio Doce de Octubre, located in Tuluá and able to seat 16,000 people, was Cortuluá's home stadium until the end of 2022. Starting from 2023, the club moved its home matches to Estadio Municipal Raúl Miranda in Yumbo, which has a capacity of 3,500 people. The club only played one season in Yumbo, moving to Estadio Francisco Rivera Escobar in Palmira for the following season.

== Honours ==
=== Domestic ===
- Categoría Primera B
  - Winners (2): 1993, 2009

=== Continental ===
- U-20 Copa Libertadores
  - Third place (1): 2016

== Performance in CONMEBOL competitions ==
- Copa Libertadores: 1 appearance

2002: First round

- U-20 Copa Libertadores: 1 appearance

2016: Third place

== Players ==
=== Notable players ===
- (Bolivia) Álvaro Peña
- (Colombia) Jairo Ampudia
- (Colombia) Javier Arizala
- (Colombia) Faustino Asprilla
- (Colombia) Víctor Bonilla
- (Colombia) Miguel Borja
- (Colombia) Mayer Candelo
- (Colombia) Óscar Díaz
- (Colombia) Diego Gómez
- (Colombia) Héctor Hurtado
- (Colombia) Edison Mafla
- (Colombia) Leonardo Mina Polo
- (Colombia) Johnnier Montaño
- (Colombia) Tressor Moreno
- (Colombia) Rubiel Quintana
- (Colombia) Hamilton Ricard
- (Colombia) Carlos Rodas
- (Colombia) Milton Rodríguez
- (Colombia) Oscar A. León
- (Colombia) Jaime Alfonso Ruiz
- (Colombia) Néstor Salazar
- (Colombia) Fernando Uribe
- (Colombia) Gustavo Victoria
- (Colombia) Mario Yepes
- (Cuba) Julio César Maya
- (Equatorial Guinea) Rolan de la Cruz
- (Equatorial Guinea) Danny Quendambú
- (Panama) Román Torres
- (Panama) Alejandro Vélez
- (Venezuela) Rafael Dudamel
- (Venezuela) Edgar Pérez Greco
