= Atlético Cali =

Colombian football club

Atlético F.C.
- Full name: Atlético Fútbol Club S.A.
- Nicknames: Aleti de Cali; Azul y Oro
- Founded: 2005; 21 years ago (As Dépor FC); 10 March 2016; 10 years ago (As Atlético F.C.)
- Ground: Pascual Guerrero
- Capacity: 38,000
- President: Gustavo Moreno Arango
- Head coach: Andrés Sicachá
- League: Categoría Primera B
- 2025: Primera B, 15th of 16
- Website: http://www.atleticofutbolclub.com/
Home colours	Away colours	Third colours

Atlético Fútbol Club (or Atlético F.C.), formerly known as Dépor FC, is a professional Colombian football team based in Cali that currently plays in the Categoría Primera B. They play their home games at the Olímpico Pascual Guerrero stadium.

== History ==
=== Origins as Dépor FC ===
The club was founded as Deportivo Pereira S.A. in 2005 after the membership rights (ficha) of Real Sincelejo, a club that competed in Categoría Primera B until 2004, were irregularly sold by one of its shareholders to investors from Pereira led by former Senator Habib Merheg who wanted to create a club to claim the license held by Deportivo Pereira and prevent the latter club from folding due to its financial problems. However, Deportivo Pereira were able to continue competing in the league, and the club was sold to its current owner Gustavo Moreno who rebranded it to Dépor FC and moved it to Cartago, Valle del Cauca.

For the following year, the club moved to Jamundí, in the same department. From 2006 to 2008 its home was the Estadio Cacique Jamundí, with a temporary return for 2010 and the first half of the 2011 season due to their home stadium being closed for remodeling works ahead of the 2011 FIFA U-20 World Cup. The club's greatest achievement was qualifying for the semifinals for the first and only time in 2008 under the leadership of coach Julio Valdivieso.

Due to financial difficulties and the support offered by Cali's local government as well as public utilities company Emcali, who wished to carry out social work with young people from the Aguablanca District in Cali, the club was renamed Dépor Aguablanca in 2009 and moved from Jamundí to represent the aforementioned sector, now playing their home games at the Estadio Pascual Guerrero. Since then, the club continued competing in Primera B without remarkable results.

=== Atlético Fútbol Club ===
In 2015, after a court ruling declared the sale of Real Sincelejo void, the former shareholders of the Sincelejo club sold it to Juan Carlos Restrepo, stepfather of footballer James Rodríguez, who intended to move the club to Ibagué, rename it to Tolima Real and enter it into the Primera B competition. Although Restrepo argued that he was the legitimate owner of the Real Sincelejo ficha, DIMAYOR refused to admit Tolima Real while at the same time Dépor FC owner Gustavo Moreno founded a new club under the name of Atlético Fútbol Club which with the consent of both DIMAYOR and Coldeportes, replaced Dépor FC in its competitions. Coldeportes withdrew Real Sincelejo's sporting license (reconocimiento deportivo), and thus the one used by Dépor to compete from 2005 until then, in order to allow Atlético F.C. to join DIMAYOR. The club is popularly known as Atlético de Cali or just Atlético.

Due to this controversy, the club was not able to play its first seven matches of the 2016 season, which were going to be awarded as losses by walkover, however they were eventually confirmed to be played after the club was renamed and accepted into the league.

In the 2021–I Primera B tournament, Atlético placed eighth in the first stage and advanced to the semifinals for the first time under that name. However, they were unable to reach the final series of the tournament after placing last in their group.

== Stadium ==
Although the club's current home stadium is the 38,000-seat Estadio Olímpico Pascual Guerrero located in Cali, prior to their establishment in Cali they played at Estadio Santa Ana in Cartago and Estadio Cacique Jamundí in Jamundí.

In 2009, the government of Valle del Cauca Department announced the construction of a stadium for the club then known as Dépor FC in the Aguablanca District of Cali. This stadium, which would be named La Bombonera de Aguablanca, would have a capacity for 15,000 spectators and would feature a synthetic turf as well as facilities to hold conferences and business meetings for micro-entrepreneurs. Despite the commitment of the department government to the project, the stadium was never built.

== Current squad ==
As of 24 September 2026

Note: Flags indicate national team as defined under FIFA eligibility rules; some limited exceptions apply. Players may hold more than one non-FIFA nationality.

No.	Pos.	Nation	Player
1	GK	COL	Juan Diego Jaramillo
2	DF	COL	Fabián Villa (on loan from Deportivo Pasto)
3	DF	COL	Jhonny Mena
4	DF	COL	José Palacios
5	DF	COL	Jhonier Julio
6	MF	COL	Nicolás Hernández
7	MF	COL	Mauricio Delgado
8	MF	COL	Carlos Restrepo
9	FW	COL	Alejandro Oñate
10	MF	COL	Gabriel Erazo
11	FW	COL	Carlos Cabezas
12	GK	ESP	Juan Pablo Múnera
13	FW	COL	Jean Galindo (on loan from Deportivo Cali)
14	FW	COL	Luis Landázuri

No.	Pos.	Nation	Player
15	DF	COL	Jhon Veira
17	MF	COL	Luis Riascos
18	DF	COL	Kevin Angulo
19	FW	COL	Jaider Cortés
20	DF	COL	Juan Diego Perdomo
21	MF	COL	Gian Gironza
22	DF	COL	Albin Valencia
23	FW	COL	Edwin Hormaza
24	MF	COL	Santiago Saavedra
26	MF	COL	Samuel Córdoba
27	MF	COL	Christopher Cano
28	DF	COL	Samuel Copete
29	FW	COL	Jorge Puerto
—	GK	BOL	David Pedraza

== Managers ==
- (Colombia) Álvaro Zuluaga (2006)
- (Colombia) Julio Valdivieso (2007)
- (Colombia) Jorge Bermúdez (2007–2008)
- (Colombia) Félix Valverde (2009)
- (Colombia) Nelson Abadía (2009)
- (Colombia) Álvaro Zuluaga (2010)
- (Colombia) Víctor Bonilla (January 2011 – May 2011)
- (Colombia) Walter Escobar (June 2011 – November 2011)
- (Colombia) Albeiro García (November 2011 – June 2012)
- (Colombia) Jhon Jairo López (July 2012–June 2013)
- (Colombia) Andrés Sicachá (July 2013 – June 2016)
- (Colombia) Luis Eduardo Gómez (January 2017 – December 2017)
- (Colombia) Giovanni Hernández (January 2018 – November 2023)
- (Brazil) Clodoaldo (November 2023 – December 2024)
- (Colombia) Andrés Sicachá (January 2025 – present)
