= Itagüí Leones F.C. =

Colombian football club

Itagüí Leones
- Full name: Itagüí Leones Fútbol Club
- Nicknames: El Equipo Felino; Los Felinos; Los Felinos de Antioquia; Los Felinos del Valle de Aburrá; La Garra Antioqueña; Auriverdes
- Founded: 15 February 1944; 82 years ago as Deportivo Rionegro; 1 January 2015; 11 years ago as Leones F.C.
- Ground: Metropolitano Ciudad de Itagüí
- Capacity: 12,000
- President: Carlos Murillo
- Head coach: Alejandro Arboleda
- League: Categoría Primera B
- 2025: Primera B, 14th of 16
- Website: www.leonesfc.co
Home colours	Away colours	Third colours

Itagüí Leones Fútbol Club, also known as Itagüí Leones, is a professional Colombian football team based in Itagüí playing in the Categoría Primera B starting from 2019. They play their home games at the Estadio Metropolitano Ciudad de Itagüí.

== History ==
Founded as Deportivo Rionegro in 1944, Leones Fútbol Club participated in all seasons of the Categoría Primera B from 1991 to 2017, when the team was runner-up of the tournament and was promoted to Categoría Primera A for the first time.

The team played for almost forty years in the amateur league. The team's first president was Libardo Sanchez and his first manager was Alfonso Piedrahita. Thanks to its performances and achievements in the 80s the club was admitted in the first edition of the Categoría Primera B, the second-tier of the professional Colombian league, played in 1991. In 1993, with the direction of manager Carlos Augusto Navarrete, Rionegro managed to be among the five best of the tournament. The team got its best performance in 2001, when they were runners-up under the direction of manager Orlando Restrepo.

In 2008 Deportivo Rionegro, with René Higuita as their captain and star and with Óscar Aristizábal as manager, managed to win the first tournament of the year, defeating Unión Magdalena in the final, but in the second half failed to reach the final, so they had to fight for the title of the Primera B against Real Cartagena, losing on aggregate by 2-4. They played the promotion matches against Envigado F.C., but lost by a score of 3-1 on aggregate. In 2014 Deportivo Rionegro moved to Bello and changed its name to Leones Fútbol Club. The following year they moved to Turbo where they stayed for another year before moving back to the Medellín metropolitan area in 2016, establishing themselves in Itagüí.

Leones ended as runners-up in the 2017 Primera B, winning the Torneo Finalización and then going on to lose the final to Boyacá Chicó on penalty kicks. However, since they ended the season as the best team in the aggregate table, they earned promotion to the Categoría Primera A for the 2018 season, the first time the team played in the first division. They were relegated back to Primera B at the end of the season, finishing in bottom place of the relegation table.

== Honours ==
=== Domestic ===
- Categoría Primera B
  - Runners-up (1): 2017

== Players ==
=== Current squad ===
As of 7 October 2026

Note: Flags indicate national team as defined under FIFA eligibility rules; some limited exceptions apply. Players may hold more than one non-FIFA nationality.

No.	Pos.	Nation	Player
1	GK	COL	Jhon Figueroa
2	DF	COL	Juan Parra
3	DF	COL	Jerónimo Moreno
5	DF	COL	Germán Meneses
7	MF	COL	Cristian Rodríguez
8	MF	COL	David Villa
9	FW	COL	Juan David Bonilla
10	MF	BRA	Lucas Sanches
12	GK	COL	Juan Arboleda
13	DF	COL	Miguel Arboleda
14	FW	COL	Dayán Moreno
15	MF	COL	Jiner Martínez
16	DF	COL	Camilo Rentería
17	FW	COL	Juan José Montoya (on loan from Deportivo Cali)

No.	Pos.	Nation	Player
18	DF	COL	Nicolás Restrepo
19	MF	COL	Johan Martínez
20	FW	COL	Kevin Peñaloza
21	FW	COL	Óscar Segura
22	DF	COL	Juan Restrepo
23	FW	COL	Leider Pacheco
24	FW	COL	Santiago Montoya
25	MF	COL	Thomas Calle
26	MF	COL	Samuel Posada
27	FW	COL	Juan Castaño
28	MF	COL	Felipe Hincapié
30	MF	COL	Rafael Granados
33	DF	COL	Ismael López
35	DF	COL	Jerónimo Echeverry

=== Notable players ===
- (Colombia) Iván Córdoba (1993-1995)
- (Colombia) Samuel Vanegas (1996)
- (Colombia) Vladimir Marín (1999-2001)
- (Colombia) Neider Morantes (2005)
- (Colombia) René Higuita (2008-2009)
- (Colombia) Jefferson Duque (2010-2012)

== Managers ==
- (Colombia) Álvaro Hernández (January 2012 – December 2015)
- (Colombia) Juan Álvarez (January 2016 – August 2018)
- (Colombia) Luis Amaranto Perea (August 2018 – May 2019)
- (Colombia) Álvaro Hernández (July 2019 – August 2023)
- (Colombia) Giovanny Ruiz (August 2023 – November 2024)
- (Colombia) Felipe Merino (December 2024 – September 2025)
- (Colombia) Alejandro Arboleda (September 2025 – present)
