= 1997 Categoría Primera B season =

Categoría Primera B
- Season: 1997
- Champions: Atlético Huila (2nd title)
- Promoted: Atlético Huila
- Relegated: Alianza Llanos
- Top goalscorer: John Jairo Quiñónez (13 goals)

The 1997 Categoría Primera B season, (officially known as the 1997 Copa Concasa for sponsorship reasons) was the 8th season of Colombia's second division football league. Atlético Huila won the tournament for the second time and was promoted to the Categoría Primera A. John Jairo Quiñónez, playing for Real Cartagena, was the topscorer with 13 goals.

== Teams ==
16 teams take part in the season. The previous season's champions Deportivo Unicosta was promoted to Primera A for the 1997 season, being replaced in Primera B for this season by Cúcuta Deportivo, who were relegated from Primera A at the end of the 1996–97 season after finishing in the bottom of the top tier's relegation table. After finishing last in the 1996–97 season, River Plate was relegated to Categoría Primera C. Independiente Popayán did not take part of the tournament. Atlético Buenaventura was accepted again by DIMAYOR to compete in the tournament, after three years without competing. Real Floridablanca was the only debuting team for this season.

Team	City	Stadium
Alianza Llanos	Villavicencio	Manuel Calle Lombana
Alianza Petrolera	Barrancabermeja	Daniel Villa Zapata
Atlético Buenaventura	Buenaventura	Marino Klinger
Atlético Córdoba	Cereté	Alberto Saibis Saker
Atlético Huila	Neiva	Guillermo Plazas Alcid
Bello	Bello	Tulio Ospina
Cooperamos Tolima	Ibagué	Manuel Murillo Toro
Cúcuta Deportivo	Cúcuta	General Santander
Deportivo Antioquia	Itagüí	Metropolitano Ciudad de Itagüí
Deportivo Pasto	Pasto	Departamental Libertad
Deportivo Rionegro	Rionegro	Alberto Grisales
El Cóndor	Bogotá	El Campincito
Girardot	Girardot	Luis Antonio Duque Peña
Lanceros Boyacá	Tunja	La Independencia
Real Cartagena	Cartagena	Jaime Morón León
Real Floridablanca	Floridablanca	Álvaro Gómez Hurtado

Categoría Primera B
1997 champion
Atlético Huila
2nd title
