= 1996–97 Categoría Primera B season =

Categoría Primera B
- Season: 1996–97
- Champions: Deportivo Unicosta (1st title)
- Promoted: Deportivo Unicosta
- Relegated: River Plate
- Top goalscorer: Henry Vásquez (27 goals)

The 1996–97 Categoría Primera B season, (officially known as the 1996–97 Copa Concasa for sponsorship reasons) was the 7th season of Colombia's second division football league. Deportivo Unicosta won the tournament for the first time and was promoted to the Categoría Primera A. Henry Vásquez, playing for Deportivo Unicosta, was the topscorer with 27 goals.

== Teams ==
16 teams take part in the season. The previous season's champions Cúcuta Deportivo was promoted to Primera A for the 1996–97 season, being replaced in Primera B for this season by Atlético Huila, who were relegated from Primera A at the end of the 1995–96 season after finishing in the bottom of the top tier's relegation table. Cartago did not take part of the tournament. Three additional teams, Atlético Córdoba, Cooperamos Tolima and Deportivo Pasto, were accepted by DIMAYOR to compete in the tournament.

Team	City	Stadium
Alianza Llanos	Villavicencio	Manuel Calle Lombana
Alianza Petrolera	Barrancabermeja	Daniel Villa Zapata
Atlético Córdoba	Cereté	Alberto Saibis Saker
Atlético Huila	Neiva	Guillermo Plazas Alcid
Bello	Bello	Tulio Ospina
Cooperamos Tolima	Ibagué	Manuel Murillo Toro
Deportivo Antioquia	Itagüí	Metropolitano Ciudad de Itagüí
Deportivo Pasto	Pasto	Departamental Libertad
Deportivo Rionegro	Rionegro	Alberto Grisales
Deportivo Unicosta	Barranquilla	Romelio Martínez
El Cóndor	Bogotá	El Campincito
Girardot	Girardot	Luis Antonio Duque Peña
Independiente Popayán	Popayán	Ciro López
Lanceros Boyacá	Tunja	La Independencia
Real Cartagena	Cartagena	Jaime Morón León
River Plate	Buga	Hernando Azcárate Martínez

Categoría Primera B
1996–97 champion
Deportivo Unicosta
1st title
