= 1995–96 Categoría Primera B season =

Categoría Primera B
- Season: 1995–96
- Champions: Cúcuta Deportivo (1st title)
- Promoted: Cúcuta Deportivo
- Top goalscorer: Jorge Enrique Ramírez (23 goals)

The 1995–96 Categoría Primera B season, (officially known as the 1995–96 Copa Concasa for sponsorship reasons) was the 6th season of Colombia's second division football league. Cúcuta Deportivo won the tournament for the first time and was promoted to the Categoría Primera A. Jorge Enrique Ramírez, playing for Cúcuta Deportivo, was the topscorer with 23 goals.

== Teams ==
14 teams take part in the season. The previous season's champions Atlético Bucaramanga was promoted to Primera A for the 1995–96 season, being replaced in Primera B for this season by Cúcuta Deportivo, who were relegated from Primera A at the end of the 1995 season after finishing in the bottom of the top tier's aggregate table. Academia Bogotana, Fiorentina and Santa Rosa de Cabal did not take part of the tournament. Three additional teams, Cartago, Girardot and River Plate, were accepted by DIMAYOR to compete in the tournament.

Team	City	Stadium
Alianza Llanos	Villavicencio	Manuel Calle Lombana
Alianza Petrolera	Barrancabermeja	Daniel Villa Zapata
Bello	Bello	Tulio Ospina
Cartago	Cartago	Santa Ana
Cúcuta Deportivo	Cúcuta	General Santander
Deportivo Antioquia	Itagüí	Metropolitano Ciudad de Itagüí
Deportivo Rionegro	Rionegro	Alberto Grisales
Deportivo Unicosta	Barranquilla	Romelio Martínez
El Cóndor	Bogotá	El Campincito
Girardot	Girardot	Luis Antonio Duque Peña
Independiente Popayán	Popayán	Ciro López
Lanceros Boyacá	Tunja	La Independencia
Real Cartagena	Cartagena	Jaime Morón León
River Plate	Buga	Hernando Azcárate Martínez

Categoría Primera B
1995–96 champion
Cúcuta Deportivo
1st title
