= 1993 Categoría Primera B season =

Categoría Primera B
- Season: 1993
- Champions: Cortuluá (1st title)
- Promoted: Cortuluá
- Relegated: Deportes Risaralda
- Top goalscorer: Plácido Bonilla (21 goals)

The 1993 Categoría Primera B season, (officially known as the 1993 Copa Concasa for sponsorship reasons) was the 3rd season of Colombia's second division football league. Cortuluá won the tournament for the first time and was promoted to the Categoría Primera A. Plácido Bonilla, playing for Cortuluá, was the topscorer with 21 goals.

== Teams ==
14 teams take part in the season. The previous season's champions Atlético Huila was promoted to Primera A for the 1993 season, being replaced in Primera B for this season by Real Cartagena, who were relegated from Primera A at the end of the 1992 season after finishing in the bottom of the top tier's aggregate table. Three additional teams, Deportes Risaralda, Fiorentina and Lanceros Boyacá, were accepted by DIMAYOR to compete in the tournament. Deportes Dinastía, who participated in the previous tournament, did not enter to the tournament. Deportivo Armenia moved from Armenia to Buga and rebranded as Guadalajara de Buga.

Team	City	Stadium
Academia Bogotana	Bogotá	El Campincito
Alianza Llanos	Villavicencio	Manuel Calle Lombana
Alianza Petrolera	Barrancabermeja	Daniel Villa Zapata
Atlético Buenaventura	Buenaventura	Marino Klinger
Cortuluá	Tuluá	Doce de Octubre
Deportes Risaralda	Pereira	Alberto Mora Mora
Deportivo Rionegro	Rionegro	Alberto Grisales
El Cóndor	Bogotá	El Campincito
Fiorentina	Florencia	Alberto Buitrago Hoyos
Guadalajara de Buga	Buga	Hernando Azcárate Martínez
Industrial Itagüí	Itagüí	Metropolitano Ciudad de Itagüí
Lanceros Boyacá	Tunja	La Independencia
Palmira	Palmira	Francisco Rivera Escobar
Real Cartagena	Cartagena	Jaime Morón León

Categoría Primera B
1993 champion
Cortuluá
1st title
