= 1995 Categoría Primera B season =

Categoría Primera B
- Season: 1995
- Champions: Atlético Bucaramanga (1st title)
- Promoted: Atlético Bucaramanga
- Top goalscorer: Jesús Barrios (12 goals)

The 1995 Categoría Primera B season, (officially known as the 1995 Copa Concasa for sponsorship reasons) was the 5th season of Colombia's second division football league. Atlético Bucaramanga won the tournament for the first time and was promoted to the Categoría Primera A. Jesús Barrios, playing for Atlético Bucaramanga, was the top scorer with 12 goals.

== Teams ==
Fourteen teams take part in the season. The previous season's champions Deportes Tolima was promoted to Primera A for the 1995 season, being replaced in Primera B for this season by Atlético Bucaramanga, who were relegated from Primera A at the end of the 1994 season after finishing in the bottom of the top tier's aggregate table. After finishing last in the 1994 season, Deportivo Samarios was relegated to Categoría Primera C. Atlético Buenaventura, Guadalajara de Buga and Palmira did not take part of the tournament. Four additional teams, Bello, Deportivo Unicosta, Independiente Popayán and Santa Rosa, were accepted by DIMAYOR to compete in the tournament.

Team	City	Stadium
Academia Bogotana	Bogotá	El Campincito
Alianza Llanos	Villavicencio	Manuel Calle Lombana
Alianza Petrolera	Barrancabermeja	Daniel Villa Zapata
Atlético Bucaramanga	Bucaramanga	Alfonso López
Bello	Bello	Tulio Ospina
Deportivo Antioquia	Itagüí	Metropolitano Ciudad de Itagüí
Deportivo Rionegro	Rionegro	Alberto Grisales
Deportivo Unicosta	Barranquilla	Romelio Martínez
El Cóndor	Bogotá	El Campincito
Fiorentina	Florencia	Alberto Buitrago Hoyos
Independiente Popayán	Popayán	Ciro López
Lanceros Boyacá	Tunja	La Independencia
Real Cartagena	Cartagena	Jaime Morón León
Santa Rosa	Santa Rosa de Cabal	Arturo Arbeláez

Categoría Primera B
1995 champion

1st title
