= 1998 Categoría Primera B season =

Categoría Primera B
- Season: 1998
- Champions: Deportivo Pasto (1st title)
- Promoted: Deportivo Pasto
- Relegated: Real Floridablanca
- Top goalscorer: Nilson Pérez (20 goals)

The 1998 Categoría Primera B season, (officially known as the 1998 Copa Águila for sponsorship reasons) was the 9th season of Colombia's second division football league. Deportivo Pasto won the tournament for the first time and was promoted to the Categoría Primera A. Nilson Pérez, playing for Deportivo Rionegro, was the topscorer with 20 goals.

== Teams ==
16 teams take part in the season. The previous season's champions Atlético Huila was promoted to Primera A for the 1998 season, being replaced in Primera B for this season by Deportivo Pereira, who were relegated from Primera A at the end of the 1997 season after finishing in the bottom of the top tier's relegation table. After finishing last in the 1997 season, Alianza Llanos was relegated to Categoría Primera C and was replaced by Escuela Carlos Sarmiento Lora, champions of the 1997 Primera C. Atlético Buenaventura did not take part of the tournament. Deportivo Antioquia changed its name to Itagüí F.C.. Univalle was the only debuting team for this season.

Team	City	Stadium
Alianza Petrolera	Barrancabermeja	Daniel Villa Zapata
Atlético Córdoba	Cereté	Alberto Saibis Saker
Bello	Bello	Tulio Ospina
Cooperamos Tolima	Ibagué	Manuel Murillo Toro
Cúcuta Deportivo	Cúcuta	General Santander
Deportivo Pasto	Pasto	Departamental Libertad
Deportivo Pereira	Pereira	Hernán Ramírez Villegas
Deportivo Rionegro	Rionegro	Alberto Grisales
El Cóndor	Bogotá	El Campincito
Escuela Carlos Sarmiento Lora	Popayán	Estadio Ciro López
Girardot	Girardot	Luis Antonio Duque Peña
Itagüí	Itagüí	Metropolitano Ciudad de Itagüí
Lanceros Boyacá	Tunja	La Independencia
Real Cartagena	Cartagena	Jaime Morón León
Real Floridablanca	Floridablanca	Álvaro Gómez Hurtado
Univalle	Jamundí	Cacique Jamundí

Categoría Primera B
1998 champion
Deportivo Pasto
1st title
