= 1994 Categoría Primera B season =

Categoría Primera B
- Season: 1994
- Champions: Deportes Tolima (1st title)
- Promoted: Deportes Tolima
- Relegated: Deportivo Samarios
- Top goalscorer: Julio Javier Doldán (18 goals)

The 1994 Categoría Primera B season, (officially known as the 1994 Copa Concasa for sponsorship reasons) was the 4th season of Colombia's second division football league. Deportes Tolima won the tournament for the first time and was promoted to the Categoría Primera A. Julio Javier Doldán, playing for Deportes Tolima, was the topscorer with 18 goals.

== Teams ==
14 teams take part in the season. The previous season's champions Cortuluá was promoted to Primera A for the 1994 season, being replaced in Primera B for this season by Deportes Tolima, who were relegated from Primera A at the end of the 1993 season after finishing in the bottom of the top tier's aggregate table. After finishing last in the 1993 season, Industrial Itagüí disbanded and was replaced by Deportivo Samarios, Unión Magdalena's reserve team and champions of the 1993 Primera C. Deportes Risaralda, who placed second to last in the 1993 season, was sold and rebranded as Deportivo Antioquia.

Team	City	Stadium
Academia Bogotana	Bogotá	El Campincito
Alianza Llanos	Villavicencio	Manuel Calle Lombana
Alianza Petrolera	Barrancabermeja	Daniel Villa Zapata
Atlético Buenaventura	Buenaventura	Marino Klinger
Deportes Tolima	Ibagué	Manuel Murillo Toro
Deportivo Antioquia	Itagüí	Metropolitano Ciudad de Itagüí
Deportivo Rionegro	Rionegro	Alberto Grisales
Deportivo Samarios	Santa Marta	Eduardo Santos
El Cóndor	Bogotá	El Campincito
Fiorentina	Florencia	Alberto Buitrago Hoyos
Guadalajara de Buga	Buga	Hernando Azcárate Martínez
Lanceros Boyacá	Tunja	La Independencia
Palmira	Palmira	Francisco Rivera Escobar
Real Cartagena	Cartagena	Jaime Morón León

Categoría Primera B
1994 champion
Deportes Tolima
1st title
