= 2001 Categoría Primera B season =

Categoría Primera B
- Season: 2001
- Champions: Deportes Quindío (1st title)
- Promoted: Deportes Quindío; Unión Magdalena
- Top goalscorer: Edinson Castro (15 goals)

The 2001 Categoría Primera B season, (officially known as the 2001 Copa Águila for sponsorship reasons) was the 12th season of Colombia's second division football league. Deportes Quindío won the tournament for the first time and was promoted to the Categoría Primera A. After expanding the number of Primera A teams from 16 to 18, DIMAYOR organised a special promotion tournament, where the top two teams were promoted. The two DIMAYOR affiliates that were taking part in Primera B and failed to earn promotion (Cúcuta Deportivo and Unión Magdalena) were invited to compete, as well as Atlético Bucaramanga as the team that was relegated from Primera A at the end of the season, with Unión Magdalena and Atlético Bucaramanga being promoted. Edinson Castro, playing for Deportivo Rionegro, was the topscorer with 15 goals.

== Teams ==
16 teams take part in the season. The previous season's champions Deportivo Pereira was promoted to Primera A for the 2001 season. Deportes Quindío were relegated from Primera A at the end of the 2000 season after finishing in the bottom of the top tier's relegation table. After finishing last in the 2000 season, Cooperamos Tolima was relegated to Categoría Primera C and was replaced by El Cerrito, champions of the 2000 Primera C. Soledad and Unión Meta did not take part of the tournament. Lanceros Fair Play moved to Chía and rebranded as Club Fair Play. Atlético Barranquilla and Chicó were the debuting teams for this season.

Team	City	Stadium
Alianza Petrolera	Barrancabermeja	Daniel Villa Zapata
Atlético Barranquilla	Barranquilla	Romelio Martínez
Bello	Bello	Tulio Ospina
Chicó	Zipaquirá	Los Zipas
Club Fair Play	Chía	La Luna
Cúcuta Deportivo	Cúcuta	General Santander
Deportes Quindío	Armenia	Centenario
Deportivo Rionegro	Rionegro	Alberto Grisales
El Cerrito	El Cerrito	Alfredo Vásquez Cobo
El Cóndor	Bogotá	El Campincito
Escuela Carlos Sarmiento Lora	Cali	Pascual Guerrero
Expreso Palmira	Palmira	Francisco Rivera Escobar
Girardot	Girardot	Luis Antonio Duque Peña
Itagüí	Itagüí	Metropolitano Ciudad de Itagüí
Unión Magdalena	Santa Marta	Eduardo Santos
Unión Soacha	Soacha	Luis Carlos Galán Sarmiento

Categoría Primera B
2001 champion
Deportes Quindío
1st title
