= 2000 Categoría Primera B season =

Categoría Primera B
- Season: 2000
- Champions: Deportivo Pereira (1st title)
- Promoted: Deportivo Pereira
- Relegated: Cooperamos Tolima
- Top goalscorer: Gustavo Iturburo (21 goals)

The 2000 Categoría Primera B season, (officially known as the 2000 Copa Águila for sponsorship reasons) was the 11th season of Colombia's second division football league. Deportivo Pereira won the tournament for the first time and was promoted to the Categoría Primera A. Gustavo Iturburo, playing for Unión Magdalena, was the topscorer with 21 goals.

== Teams ==
16 teams take part in the season. The previous season's champions Real Cartagena was promoted to Primera A for the 2000 season. Unión Magdalena were relegated from Primera A at the end of the 1999 season after finishing in the bottom of the top tier's relegation table. Atlético Córdoba and Atlético Popayán did not take part of the tournament. Cúcuta 2001 changed its name back to Cúcuta Deportivo and Palmira changed its name to Expreso Palmira. Unión Soacha and Unión Meta were the debuting teams for this season.

Team	City	Stadium
Alianza Petrolera	Barrancabermeja	Daniel Villa Zapata
Bello	Bello	Tulio Ospina
Cooperamos Tolima	Ibagué	Manuel Murillo Toro
Cúcuta Deportivo	Cúcuta	General Santander
Deportivo Pereira	Pereira	Hernán Ramírez Villegas
Deportivo Rionegro	Rionegro	Alberto Grisales
El Cóndor	Bogotá	El Campincito
Escuela Carlos Sarmiento Lora	Cali	Pascual Guerrero
Expreso Palmira	Palmira	Francisco Rivera Escobar
Girardot	Girardot	Luis Antonio Duque Peña
Itagüí	Itagüí	Metropolitano Ciudad de Itagüí
Lanceros Fair Play	Tunja	La Independencia
Soledad	Soledad	Romelio Martínez
Unión Magdalena	Santa Marta	Eduardo Santos
Unión Meta	Villavicencio	Bello Horizonte
Unión Soacha	Soacha	Luis Carlos Galán Sarmiento

Categoría Primera B
2000 champion
Deportivo Pereira
1st title
