= 2004 Categoría Primera B season =

Categoría Primera B
- Season: 2004
- Champions: Real Cartagena (2nd title)
- Promoted: Real Cartagena
- Top goalscorer: Blas Pérez (29 goals)

The 2004 Categoría Primera B season, (officially known as the 2004 Copa Premier for sponsorship reasons) was the 15th season of Colombia's second division football league. Real Cartagena won the tournament for the second time and was promoted to the Categoría Primera A. Blas Pérez, playing for Centauros Villavicencio, was the topscorer with 29 goals.

== Teams ==
18 teams take part in the season. The previous season's champions Bogotá Chicó was promoted to Primera A for the 2004 season. Centauros Villavicencio were relegated from Primera A at the end of the 2003 season after finishing in the bottom of the top tier's relegation table. Dimerco Popayán and El Cóndor did not take part of the tournament. Chía Fair Play is renamed as Chía and Itagüí is renamed back as Deportivo Antioquia. Bajo Cauca, Bogotá and Valledupar were the debuting teams for this season.

Team	City	Stadium
Alianza Petrolera	Barrancabermeja	Daniel Villa Zapata
Bajo Cauca	Caucasia	Orlando Aníbal Monroy
Bello	Bello	Tulio Ospina
Bogotá	Bogotá	Alfonso López Pumarejo
Centauros Villavicencio	Villavicencio	Manuel Calle Lombana
Chía Fair Play	Chía	La Luna
Cúcuta Deportivo	Cúcuta	General Santander
Deportivo Antioquia	Itagüí	Metropolitano Ciudad de Itagüí
Deportivo Rionegro	Rionegro	Alberto Grisales
Expreso Rojo	Cartagena	Pedro de Heredia
Girardot	Girardot	Luis Antonio Duque Peña
Johann	Barranquilla	Romelio Martínez
La Equidad	Soacha	Luis Carlos Galán Sarmiento
Patriotas	Tunja	La Independencia
Pumas de Casanare	Yopal	Pier Lora Muñoz
Real Cartagena	Cartagena	Pedro de Heredia
Real Sincelejo	Sincelejo	Arturo Cumplido Sierra
Valledupar	Valledupar	Armando Maestre Pavajeau

Categoría Primera B
2004 champion
Real Cartagena
2nd title
