= 2005 Categoría Primera B season =

Categoría Primera B
- Season: 2005
- Champions: Cúcuta Deportivo (2nd title)
- Promoted: Cúcuta Deportivo
- Top goalscorer: Pablo Jaramillo and Giribeth Cotes (19 goals each)

The 2005 Categoría Primera B season, (officially known as the 2005 Copa Premier for sponsorship reasons) was the 16th season of Colombia's second division football league. Cúcuta Deportivo won the tournament for the second time and was promoted to the Categoría Primera A. Pablo Jaramillo, playing for Deportivo Rionegro, and Giribeth Cotes, playing for Valledupar, were the topscorer with 19 goals.

== Teams ==
18 teams take part in the season. The previous season's champions Real Cartagena was promoted to Primera A for the 2005 season. Cortuluá were relegated from Primera A at the end of the 2004 season after finishing in the bottom of the top tier's relegation table. Chía Fair Play, Johann and Real Sincelejo did not take part of the tournament. Deportivo Antioquia is renamed as Florida Soccer. Academia, Barranquilla and Dépor were the debuting teams for this season.

Team	City	Stadium
Academia	Bogotá	Compensar
Alianza Petrolera	Barrancabermeja	Daniel Villa Zapata
Bajo Cauca	Caucasia	Orlando Aníbal Monroy
Barranquilla	Barranquilla	Romelio Martínez
Bello	Bello	Tulio Ospina
Bogotá	Bogotá	Alfonso López Pumarejo
Centauros Villavicencio	Villavicencio	Manuel Calle Lombana
Cortuluá	Tuluá	Doce de Octubre
Cúcuta Deportivo	Cúcuta	General Santander
Dépor	Cartago	Santa Ana
Deportivo Rionegro	Rionegro	Alberto Grisales
Expreso Rojo	Sincelejo	Arturo Cumplido Sierra
Florida Soccer	La Ceja	Carlos Alberto Bernal
Girardot	Girardot	Luis Antonio Duque Peña
La Equidad	Soacha	Luis Carlos Galán Sarmiento
Patriotas	Tunja	La Independencia
Pumas de Casanare	Yopal	Pier Lora Muñoz
Valledupar	Valledupar	Armando Maestre Pavajeau

Categoría Primera B
2005 champion
Cúcuta Deportivo
2nd title
