= 2006 Categoría Primera B season =

Copa Premier
- Season: 2006
- Dates: 11 February – 29 November 2006
- Champions: La Equidad (1st title)
- Promoted: La Equidad
- Relegated: None
- Top goalscorer: Eric Cantillo (22 goals)

The 2006 Categoría Primera B season, officially known as the 2006 Copa Premier for sponsorship reasons, was the 17th season of Colombia's second-tier football league Categoría Primera B since its founding. The competition began on 11 February and ended on 29 November 2006. La Equidad were the champions, winning both of the season's short tournaments to claim their first Primera B title as well as promotion to Categoría Primera A.

== Format ==
The season was divided into two tournaments: Torneo I and Torneo II. In both tournaments, the 18 participating teams were drawn into two groups of nine teams each, with teams playing all teams in their group as well as one team from the other group twice. In Torneo I, the groups were formed by geographical criteria, grouping nearby teams, while in the second tournament of the season, geographical rivals were assigned to different groups. The top two teams of each group advanced to a final group stage which was also played in a double round-robin fashion. The winners of both of the season's tournaments would face each other in the season's grand final, with the champion being promoted at the end of the season and the runner-up playing the promotion/relegation playoff, which was implemented starting from this season.

== Teams ==
18 teams took part in the competition in this season. The 2005 Primera B champions Cúcuta Deportivo, who were promoted to Categoría Primera A, were replaced by Unión Magdalena, relegated from the top flight in the previous season. Prior to the start of the season, Florida Soccer was sold and moved to Montería, becoming Córdoba F.C., Bello F.C. was renamed Atlético Bello, and Dépor F.C. relocated from Cartago, Valle del Cauca to Jamundí, in the same department.

Locations of the 2006 Categoría Primera B teams.

Club	City	Stadium	Capacity
Academia	Bogotá	Compensar	4,500
Alianza Petrolera	Barrancabermeja	Daniel Villa Zapata	8,000
Atlético Bello	Bello	Tulio Ospina	12,000
Bajo Cauca	Caucasia	Orlando Aníbal Monroy	4,000
Barranquilla	Barranquilla	Romelio Martínez	10,000
Bogotá	Bogotá	Alfonso López Pumarejo	12,000
Centauros	Villavicencio	Manuel Calle Lombana	15,000
Córdoba	Cereté	Alberto Saibis Saker	12,000
Cortuluá	Tuluá	Doce de Octubre	16,000
Dépor	Jamundí	Cacique Jamundí	3,500
Deportivo Rionegro	Rionegro	Alberto Grisales	14,000
Expreso Rojo	Sincelejo	Arturo Cumplido Sierra (Note: Temporary home stadium for the Torneo I due to remodeling works at Estadio Pedro de Heredia.)	5,000
Expreso Rojo	Cartagena	Pedro de Heredia	10,000
Girardot	Girardot	Luis Antonio Duque Peña	15,000
La Equidad	Soacha	Luis Carlos Galán Sarmiento	8,000
Patriotas	Tunja	La Independencia	8,500
Pumas de Casanare	Yopal	Santiago de las Atalayas	10,000
Unión Magdalena	Santa Marta	Eduardo Santos	22,000
Valledupar	Valledupar	Armando Maestre Pavajeau	10,000

== Torneo I ==
=== First stage ===
==== Group A ====
Pos	Team	Pld	W	D	L	GF	GA	GD	Pts	Qualification
1	Unión Magdalena	18	12	4	2	27	9	+18	40	Advance to Cuadrangular Final
2	Valledupar	18	8	6	4	17	18	−1	30	Advance to Cuadrangular Final
3	Bajo Cauca	18	8	3	7	17	19	−2	27	
4	Córdoba	18	5	8	5	19	22	−3	23	
5	Alianza Petrolera	18	6	4	8	19	17	+2	22	
6	Expreso Rojo	18	5	7	6	18	19	−1	22	
7	Deportivo Rionegro	18	5	4	9	14	21	−7	19	
8	Atlético Bello	18	3	7	8	13	23	−10	16	
9	Barranquilla	18	3	6	9	17	21	−4	15	

Source: RSSSF
Rules for classification: 1) Points, 2) Goal difference, 3) Goals for, 4) Away goals for, 5) Away goals against, 6) Drawing of lots.

==== Group B ====
Pos	Team	Pld	W	D	L	GF	GA	GD	Pts	Qualification
1	La Equidad	18	11	3	4	24	15	+9	36	Advance to Cuadrangular Final
2	Academia	18	10	4	4	29	13	+16	34	Advance to Cuadrangular Final
3	Dépor	18	9	3	6	23	19	+4	30	
4	Patriotas	18	7	8	3	28	17	+11	29	
5	Cortuluá	18	7	8	3	26	23	+3	29	
6	Centauros	18	5	6	7	12	15	−3	21	
7	Girardot	18	4	5	9	21	28	−7	17	
8	Bogotá	18	3	5	10	12	26	−14	14	
9	Pumas de Casanare	18	2	7	9	22	33	−11	13	

Source: RSSSF
Rules for classification: 1) Points, 2) Goal difference, 3) Goals for, 4) Away goals for, 5) Away goals against, 6) Drawing of lots.

=== Cuadrangular Final ===
Pos	Team	Pld	W	D	L	GF	GA	GD	Pts	Qualification	EQU	VAL	ACA	MAG
1	La Equidad	6	3	3	0	6	3	+3	12	Advance to the Finals	—	2–1	0–0	1–0
2	Valledupar	6	2	2	2	9	9	0	8		1–1	—	3–1	2–0
3	Academia	6	2	1	3	6	5	+1	7		0–1	3–0	—	2–0
4	Unión Magdalena	6	1	2	3	4	8	−4	5		1–1	2–2	1–0	—

Source: RSSSF
Rules for classification: 1) Points, 2) Goal difference, 3) Goals for, 4) Away goals for, 5) Away goals against, 6) Drawing of lots.

== Torneo II ==
=== First stage ===
==== Group A ====
Pos	Team	Pld	W	D	L	GF	GA	GD	Pts	Qualification
1	Centauros	18	9	7	2	28	17	+11	34	Advance to Cuadrangular Final
2	Deportivo Rionegro	18	8	5	5	24	17	+7	29	Advance to Cuadrangular Final
3	Valledupar	18	8	4	6	23	18	+5	28	
4	Academia	18	6	7	5	22	21	+1	25	
5	Bajo Cauca	18	6	5	7	28	25	+3	23	
6	Unión Magdalena	18	6	5	7	23	29	−6	23	
7	Dépor	18	6	3	9	17	25	−8	21	
8	Bogotá	18	5	5	8	22	26	−4	20	
9	Girardot	18	3	9	6	25	25	0	18	

Source: RSSSF
Rules for classification: 1) Points, 2) Goal difference, 3) Goals for, 4) Away goals for, 5) Away goals against, 6) Drawing of lots.

==== Group B ====
Pos	Team	Pld	W	D	L	GF	GA	GD	Pts	Qualification
1	Cortuluá	18	12	4	2	31	14	+17	40	Advance to Cuadrangular Final
2	La Equidad	18	10	5	3	30	19	+11	35	Advance to Cuadrangular Final
3	Barranquilla	18	10	3	5	39	26	+13	33	
4	Pumas de Casanare	18	8	5	5	28	22	+6	29	
5	Patriotas	18	5	6	7	21	21	0	21	
6	Alianza Petrolera	18	5	4	9	16	26	−10	19	
7	Córdoba	18	5	4	9	16	33	−17	19	
8	Atlético Bello	18	3	4	11	19	35	−16	13	
9	Expreso Rojo	18	2	5	11	16	29	−13	11	

Source: RSSSF
Rules for classification: 1) Points, 2) Goal difference, 3) Goals for, 4) Away goals for, 5) Away goals against, 6) Drawing of lots.

=== Cuadrangular Final ===
Pos	Team	Pld	W	D	L	GF	GA	GD	Pts	Qualification	EQU	COR	CEN	RIO
1	La Equidad	6	3	2	1	12	6	+6	11	Advance to the Finals	—	3–0	3–0	4–3
2	Cortuluá	6	3	1	2	6	6	0	10		1–0	—	1–2	2–0
3	Centauros	6	2	2	2	5	9	−4	8		1–1	1–1	—	1–0
4	Deportivo Rionegro	6	1	1	4	7	9	−2	4		1–1	0–1	3–0	—

Source: RSSSF
Rules for classification: 1) Points, 2) Goal difference, 3) Goals for, 4) Away goals for, 5) Away goals against, 6) Drawing of lots.

== Finals ==
The final series was canceled after La Equidad won the season's two short tournaments, promoting directly to Categoría Primera A.

Copa Premier
2006 champions

1st title

== Runners-up playoff ==
Given the cancellation of the final series, a playoff series between Valledupar and Cortuluá, runners-up of the Torneo I and Torneo II, respectively, was played to decide the team that would advance to the promotion/relegation playoff.

11 November 2006

Valledupar	3–2	Cortuluá

Estadio Armando Maestre Pavajeau, Valledupar

18 November 2006

Cortuluá	0–0	Valledupar

Estadio Doce de Octubre, Tuluá

Valledupar won 3–2 on aggregate and advanced to the promotion/relegation playoff.

== Promotion/relegation playoff ==
As the second worst team in the 2006 Categoría Primera A season's relegation table, Atlético Huila had to play a two-legged tie against Valledupar, the runners-up playoff winner. Atlético Huila, who played the second leg at home as the Primera A team, won both matches of the series and ensured their continuity in Primera A for the 2007 season, while Valledupar remained in Primera B.

22 November 2006
20:45 UTC−5

Valledupar	0–1	Atlético Huila
	Report	Millán 1'

Estadio Armando Maestre Pavajeau, Valledupar
Referee: Jorge Hernán Hoyos

29 November 2006
20:30 UTC−5

Atlético Huila	2–0	Valledupar
Ruiz 28'; Molina 46'	Report

Estadio Guillermo Plazas Alcid, Neiva

Atlético Huila won 3–0 on aggregate and both teams remained in their respective leagues.

== Top scorers ==
Rank	Player	Club	Goals
1	(Colombia) Eric Cantillo	Pumas de Casanare	22
2	(Colombia) Fredys Arrieta	Barranquilla	21
3	(Colombia) Roberto Polo	Cortuluá	19
4	(Colombia) Mario Sergio Angulo	Unión Magdalena	16

Source: Historia del Fútbol Profesional Colombiano 70 Años
