= 1999 Categoría Primera B season =

Categoría Primera B
- Season: 1999
- Champions: Real Cartagena (1st title)
- Promoted: Real Cartagena
- Top goalscorer: Julián Vásquez (21 goals)

The 1999 Categoría Primera B season, (officially known as the 1999 Copa Águila for sponsorship reasons) was the 10th season of Colombia's second division football league. Real Cartagena won the tournament for the first time and was promoted to the Categoría Primera A. Julián Vásquez, playing for Itagüí, was the topscorer with 21 goals.

== Teams ==
16 teams take part in the season. The previous season's champions Deportivo Pasto was promoted to Primera A for the 1999 season. Deportivo Unicosta, who were relegated from Primera A at the end of the 1998 season, did not take part of the tournament. After finishing last in the 1998 season, Real Floridablanca was relegated to Categoría Primera C. Univalle did not take part of the tournament. Cúcuta Deportivo changed its name to Cúcuta 2001 and Lanceros Boyacá changed its name to Lanceros Fair Play. Atlético Popayán, Palmira, Soledad were the debuting teams for this season.

| Team | City | Stadium |
|---|---|---|
| Alianza Petrolera | Barrancabermeja | Daniel Villa Zapata |
| Atlético Córdoba | Cereté | Alberto Saibis Saker |
| Atlético Popayán | Popayán | Ciro López |
| Bello | Bello | Tulio Ospina |
| Cooperamos Tolima | Ibagué | Manuel Murillo Toro |
| Cúcuta 2001 | Cúcuta | General Santander |
| Deportivo Pereira | Pereira | Hernán Ramírez Villegas |
| Deportivo Rionegro | Rionegro | Alberto Grisales |
| El Cóndor | Bogotá | El Campincito |
| Escuela Carlos Sarmiento Lora | Popayán | Estadio Ciro López |
| Girardot | Girardot | Luis Antonio Duque Peña |
| Itagüí | Itagüí | Metropolitano Ciudad de Itagüí |
| Lanceros Fair Play | Tunja | La Independencia |
| Palmira | Palmira | Francisco Rivera Escobar |
| Real Cartagena | Cartagena | Jaime Morón León |
| Soledad | Soledad | Romelio Martínez |

Categoría Primera B
1999 champion
Real Cartagena
1st title
