= 2003 Categoría Primera B season =

Categoría Primera B
- Season: 2003
- Champions: Bogotá Chicó (1st title)
- Promoted: Bogotá Chicó
- Top goalscorer: Sergio Herrera (25 goals)

The 2003 Categoría Primera B season, (officially known as the 2003 Copa Águila for sponsorship reasons) was the 14th season of Colombia's second division football league. Bogotá Chicó won the tournament for the first time and was promoted to the Categoría Primera A. Sergio Herrera, playing for Alianza Petrolera, was the topscorer with 25 goals.

== Teams ==
17 teams take part in the season. The previous season's champions Centauros Villavicencio was promoted to Primera A for the 2003 season. Real Cartagena were relegated from Primera A at the end of the 2002 season after finishing in the bottom of the top tier's relegation table. El Cerrito and Escuela Carlos Sarmiento Lora did not take part of the tournament. Chicó is renamed as Bogotá Chicó and Cóndor Real Bogotá is renamed back as El Cóndor. Expreso Rojo, Johann, La Equidad, Patriotas and Real Sincelejo were the debuting teams for this season.

Team	City	Stadium
Alianza Petrolera	Barrancabermeja	Daniel Villa Zapata
Bello	Bello	Tulio Ospina
Bogotá Chicó	Bogotá	Alfonso López Pumarejo
Chía Fair Play	Chía	La Luna
Cúcuta Deportivo	Cúcuta	General Santander
Deportivo Rionegro	Rionegro	Alberto Grisales
Dimerco Popayán	Popayán	Ciro López
El Cóndor	Bogotá	El Campincito
Expreso Rojo	Cartagena	Pedro de Heredia
Girardot	Girardot	Luis Antonio Duque Peña
Itagüí	Itagüí	Metropolitano Ciudad de Itagüí
Johann	Barranquilla	Romelio Martínez
La Equidad	Soacha	Luis Carlos Galán Sarmiento
Patriotas	Tunja	La Independencia
Pumas de Casanare	Yopal	Pier Lora Muñoz
Real Cartagena	Cartagena	Pedro de Heredia
Real Sincelejo	Sincelejo	Arturo Cumplido Sierra

Categoría Primera B
2003 champion
Bogotá Chicó
1st title
