= 2002 Categoría Primera B season =

Categoría Primera B
- Season: 2002
- Champions: Centauros Villavicencio (1st title)
- Promoted: Centauros Villavicencio
- Top goalscorer: Freddy Guirán (17 goals)

The 2002 Categoría Primera B season, (officially known as the 2002 Copa Águila for sponsorship reasons) was the 13th season of Colombia's second division football league. Centauros Villavicencio won the tournament for the first time and was promoted to the Categoría Primera A. After expanding the number of Primera A teams from 16 to 18, DIMAYOR organised a special promotion tournament, where the top two teams were promoted. Freddy Guirán, playing for Alianza Petrolera, was the topscorer with 17 goals.

== Teams ==
14 teams take part in the season. The previous season's champions Deportes Quindío was promoted to Primera A for the 2002 season. Unión Magdalena was also promoted after winning the special promotion tournament. No team was relegated from Primera A at the end of the 2001 season due to the expansion of the number of teams from 16 to 18. Atlético Barranquilla, Expreso Palmira and Unión Soacha did not take part of the tournament. Club Fair Play is renamed as Chía Fair Play and El Cóndor is renamed as Cóndor Real Bogotá. Centauros Villavicencio, Dimerco Popayán and Pumas de Casanare were the debuting teams for this season.

Team	City	Stadium
Alianza Petrolera	Barrancabermeja	Daniel Villa Zapata
Bello	Bello	Tulio Ospina
Centauros Villavicencio	Villavicencio	Manuel Calle Lombana
Chía Fair Play	Chía	La Luna
Chicó	Zipaquirá	Los Zipas
Cóndor Real Bogotá	Bogotá	El Campincito
Cúcuta Deportivo	Cúcuta	General Santander
Deportivo Rionegro	Rionegro	Alberto Grisales
Dimerco Popayán	Popayán	Ciro López
El Cerrito	El Cerrito	Alfredo Vásquez Cobo
Escuela Carlos Sarmiento Lora	Cali	Pascual Guerrero
Girardot	Girardot	Luis Antonio Duque Peña
Itagüí	Itagüí	Metropolitano Ciudad de Itagüí
Pumas de Casanare	Yopal	Pier Lora Muñoz

Categoría Primera B
2002 champion
Centauros Villavicencio
1st title
