= 2008 Categoría Primera B season =

Copa Premier
- Season: 2008
- Champions: Real Cartagena (3rd title)
- Promoted: Real Cartagena

The 2008 Categoría Primera B season, officially known as the 2008 Copa Premier season for sponsorship reasons) was the 19th season since its founding as Colombia's second division football league.

== Teams ==
Team	City	Stadium	Capacity
Academia	Bogotá	Estadio Compensar	4,500
Alianza Petrolera	Barrancabermeja	Estadio Daniel Villa Zapata	8,000
Bajo Cauca	Caucasia	Estadio Orlando Aníbal Monroy	4,000
Barranquilla	Barranquilla	Estadio Romelio Martínez	20,000
Bogotá	Bogotá	Estadio Alfonso López Pumarejo	15,000
Centauros	Villavicencio	Estadio Manuel Calle Lombana	15,000
Córdoba	Cereté	Estadio Alberto Saibis Saker	6,000
Cortuluá	Tuluá	Estadio Doce de Octubre	16,000
Dépor	Jamundí	Estadio Cacique Jamundí	2,500
Deportivo Rionegro	Rionegro	Estadio Alberto Grisales	9,000
Expreso Rojo	Fusagasugá	Estadio Fernando Mazuera	5,000
Girardot	Girardot	Estadio Luis Antonio Duque Peña	15,000
Itagüí Ditaires	Itagüí	Estadio Metropolitano Ciudad de Itagüí	12,000
Juventud Soacha	Soacha	Estadio Luis Carlos Galán Sarmiento	8,000
Patriotas	Tunja	Estadio de La Independencia	20,000
Real Cartagena	Cartagena	Estadio Jaime Morón León	25,000
Real Santander	Floridablanca	Estadio Álvaro Gómez Hurtado	4,000
Unión Magdalena	Santa Marta	Estadio Eduardo Santos	23,000
Valledupar	Valledupar	Estadio Armando Maestre Pavajeau	10,000

- Team in italics replaced Bajo Cauca for the Torneo Finalización.

== Torneo Apertura ==
=== First stage ===
==== Group A ====
Pos	Team	Pld	W	D	L	GF	GA	GD	Pts	Qualification
1	Unión Magdalena	18	9	6	3	25	12	+13	33	Qualified for semifinals
2	Deportivo Rionegro	18	9	6	3	31	21	+10	33	Qualified for semifinals
3	Valledupar	18	8	6	4	21	18	+3	30	Qualified for semifinals
4	Córdoba	18	8	3	7	17	19	−2	27	Qualified for semifinals
5	Real Cartagena	18	6	6	6	24	23	+1	24	
6	Real Santander	18	4	8	6	17	20	−3	20	
7	Barranquilla	18	4	8	6	12	17	−5	20	
8	Bajo Cauca	18	4	5	9	14	21	−7	17	
9	Alianza Petrolera	18	3	6	9	18	31	−13	15	

==== Group B ====
Pos	Team	Pld	W	D	L	GF	GA	GD	Pts	Qualification
1	Bogotá	18	10	6	2	31	11	+20	36	Qualified for semifinals
2	Dépor	18	7	8	3	25	19	+6	29	Qualified for semifinals
3	Centauros	18	8	4	6	24	21	+3	28	Qualified for semifinals
4	Juventud Soacha	18	7	7	4	19	17	+2	28	Qualified for semifinals
5	Patriotas	18	6	5	7	22	27	−5	23	
6	Girardot	18	6	3	9	24	24	0	21	
7	Expreso Rojo	18	5	5	8	16	23	−7	20	
8	Academia	18	4	7	7	21	25	−4	19	
9	Cortuluá	18	1	8	9	15	25	−10	11	

=== Semifinals ===
==== Group A ====
Pos	Team	Pld	W	D	L	GF	GA	GD	Pts	Qualification
1	Deportivo Rionegro	6	3	2	1	11	6	+5	11	Qualified for the final
2	Juventud Soacha	6	3	1	2	9	9	0	10	
3	Valledupar	6	2	1	3	5	7	−2	7	
4	Dépor	6	1	2	3	6	9	−3	5	

==== Group B ====
Pos	Team	Pld	W	D	L	GF	GA	GD	Pts	Qualification
1	Unión Magdalena	6	3	3	0	9	6	+3	12	Qualified for the final
2	Bogotá	6	3	2	1	8	5	+3	11	
3	Centauros	6	1	3	2	5	7	−2	6	
4	Córdoba	6	0	2	4	4	8	−4	2	

=== Finals ===
June 14, 2008

Unión Magdalena	0–2	Deportivo Rionegro

Estadio Eduardo Santos, Santa Marta

June 21, 2008

Deportivo Rionegro	2–0	Unión Magdalena

Estadio Alberto Grisales, Rionegro

Deportivo Rionegro won 4–0 on aggregate.

Copa Premier
2008–I Winners

== Torneo Finalización ==
=== First stage ===
==== Group A ====
Pos	Team	Pld	W	D	L	GF	GA	GD	Pts	Qualification
1	Academia	18	9	5	4	24	16	+8	32	Qualified for semifinals
2	Deportivo Rionegro	18	8	7	3	23	18	+5	31	Qualified for semifinals
3	Unión Magdalena	18	8	4	6	19	14	+5	28	Qualified for semifinals
4	Real Cartagena	18	7	7	4	19	17	+2	28	Qualified for semifinals
5	Expreso Rojo	18	7	6	5	15	18	−3	27	
6	Itagüí Ditaires	18	6	7	5	12	11	+1	25	
7	Cortuluá	18	5	6	7	22	21	+1	21	
8	Real Santander	18	5	4	9	15	20	−5	19	
9	Centauros	18	2	5	11	13	25	−12	11	

==== Group B ====
Pos	Team	Pld	W	D	L	GF	GA	GD	Pts	Qualification
1	Barranquilla	18	8	5	5	30	21	+9	29	Qualified for semifinals
2	Dépor	18	8	4	6	21	23	−2	28	Qualified for semifinals
3	Valledupar	18	7	5	6	25	22	+3	26	Qualified for semifinals
4	Patriotas	18	6	7	5	18	19	−1	25	Qualified for semifinals
5	Bogotá	18	7	3	8	24	23	+1	24	
6	Girardot	18	7	3	8	24	24	0	24	
7	Juventud Soacha	18	6	4	8	14	19	−5	22	
8	Córdoba	18	5	6	7	17	19	−2	21	
9	Alianza Petrolera	18	3	8	7	19	24	−5	17	

=== Semifinals ===
==== Group A ====
Pos	Team	Pld	W	D	L	GF	GA	GD	Pts	Qualification
1	Real Cartagena	6	4	1	1	9	7	+2	13	Qualified for the final
2	Academia	6	4	0	2	12	4	+8	12	
3	Patriotas	6	2	0	4	6	9	−3	6	
4	Dépor	6	1	1	4	4	11	−7	4	

==== Group B ====
Pos	Team	Pld	W	D	L	GF	GA	GD	Pts	Qualification
1	Valledupar	6	3	1	2	5	6	−1	10	Qualified for the final
2	Unión Magdalena	6	2	2	2	5	4	+1	8	
3	Barranquilla	6	2	2	2	7	9	−2	8	
4	Deportivo Rionegro	6	2	1	3	6	4	+2	7	

=== Finals ===
November 15, 2008

Valledupar	2–1	Real Cartagena

Estadio Armando Maestre Pavajeau, Valledupar

November 23, 2008

Real Cartagena	2–0	Valledupar

Estadio Jaime Morón León, Cartagena

Real Cartagena won 3–2 on aggregate.

Copa Premier
2008–II Winners

== Championship final ==
November 26, 2008

Real Cartagena	3–0	Deportivo Rionegro

Estadio Jaime Morón León, Cartagena

November 29, 2008

Deportivo Rionegro	2–1	Real Cartagena

Estadio Alberto Grisales, Rionegro

Real Cartagena won 4–2 on aggregate.

Copa Premier
2008 champions

3rd title

== Promotion/relegation playoff ==
As the second worst team in the 2008 Categoría Primera A relegation table, Envigado had to play a two-legged tie against Deportivo Rionegro, the Primera B runner-up. As the Primera A team, Envigado played the second leg at home. The winner competed in the Primera A for the 2009 season, while the loser competed in the Primera B.

Team 1	Agg.	Team 2	1st leg	2nd leg
Deportivo Rionegro	1–3	Envigado	1–2	0–1
