= Luis Delgado (Colombian footballer) =

Colombian footballer (born 1980)

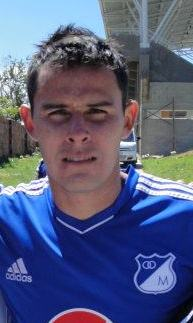

Personal information
- Full name: Luis Enrique Delgado Mancilla
- Date of birth: October 26, 1980 (age 46)
- Place of birth: Bucaramanga, Santander, Colombia
- Height: 1.84 m (6 ft 0 in)
- Position: Goalkeeper

Youth career
- 1999–2000: Atlético Bucaramanga

Senior career*
Years	Team	Apps	(Gls)
2001	Escuela Carlos Sarmiento Lora	10	(0)
2002–2004	Alianza Petrolera	30	(0)
2005–2006	Atlético Bucaramanga	7	(0)
2007	Real Santander	25	(0)
2008	Alianza Petrolera	8	(0)
2008–2009	Real Cartagena	27	(0)
2010–2015	Millonarios	160	(5)
2015–2016	Cúcuta Deportivo	8	(0)
2016	Real Cartagena	13	(0)
2016–2017	Deportes Tolima	8	(0)
2018	Atlético Bucaramanga	2	(0)
2019	Rionegro Águilas	27	(1)
2020–2021	Deportivo Pasto	10	(0)
- * Club domestic league appearances and goals as of 19:47, 25 May 2020 (UTC)

Luis Enrique Delgado Mantilla (born October 26, 1980) is a former Colombian football goalkeeper.

== Career ==
Delgado spent his youth career at Atlético Bucaramanga. In 2001, he played in Primera B with Escuela Carlos Sarmiento Lora. From 2002 to 2004 he played with Alianza Petrolera in the second division. In 2005 and 2006, he rejoined his boyhood club Atletico Bucaramanga in the top division, but only made 8 appearances across two seasons.

=== Real Cartagena ===
He joined Real Cartagena in 2008, at the time playing in the Categoría Primera B. At the end of the season, Cartagena were promoted to the 2009 Categoría Primera A. He showed good performances during the 2009 season, helping his club advance to the playoffs in the 2009 Finalizacion, which caught the attention of other big Colombian clubs.

=== Millonarios ===
In early 2010, Delgado was signed by Millonarios to be the backup goalkeeper to Juan Obelar, but after Obelar's poor performances, he was named as the starting goalkeeper and quickly became a fan favorite.

With the arrival of Nelson Ramos in 2011, Delgado was relegated to backup goalkeeper for the 2012 Apertura, and he played mainly in the 2012 Copa Colombia. In the second tournament of the year, after Nelson Ramos suffered an achilles tendon rupture, Delgado was a starter again, participating in the league as well as the Copa Sudamericana and showing good performances.

During the same period, his wife Tatiana was diagnosed with breast cancer, so the keeper decided to shave his head to support women with cancer.

On 16 December 2012, he won the 2012 Finalizacion league title with Millonarios, beating DIM in a final that was decided on penalties. Delgado scored his club's last penalty and then saved youngster Andrés Correa's penalty that ultimately would give Millonarios their 14th league title.

By the end of 2014, he was widely criticized for errors in games, and so for the 2015 season he lost the number one position with Nicolas Vikonis, playing only in the Copa Colombia.

In July 2015, he joined Cúcuta Deportivo for the 2015 Finalizacion. He returned to Real Cartagena for the 2016 Apertura.

In 2019, he joined Águilas Doradas. On 21 April 2019, he scored a free kick in the last minute to give his club a 2–1 victory over Atletico Nacional.

In 2020, he joined Deportivo Pasto, and this would ultimately be his last club as a professional, announcing his retirement shortly at the conclusion of the 2020 season.

== Career statistics ==
Appearances and goals by club, season and competition
Club	Season	League			National cup (Note: Includes Copa Colombia)		Continental		Other		Total	
Club	Season	Division	Apps	Goals	Apps	Goals	Apps	Goals	Apps	Goals	Apps	Goals
Escuela Carlos Sarmiento Lora	2001	Primera B	10	0	0	0	0	0	0	0	10	0
Alianza Petrolera	2002	Primera B	1	0	0	0	0	0	0	0	0	0
Alianza Petrolera	2003	Primera B	?	?	?	?	?	?	?	?	?	?
Alianza Petrolera	2004	Primera B	?	?	?	?	?	?	?	?	?	?
Total			30	0	0	0	0	0	0	0	30	0
Atlético Bucaramanga	2005	Primera A	4	0	0	0	0	0	0	0	4	0
Atlético Bucaramanga	2006	Primera A	4	0	0	0	0	0	0	0	4	0
Total			8	0	0	0	0	0	0	0	8	0
Real Santander	2007	Primera B	25	0	–						25	0
Alianza Petrolera	2008	Primera B	9	0	–						9	0
Real Cartagena	2008	Primera B	27	0	2	0	0	0	0	0	29	0
Real Cartagena	2009	Primera A	25	0	1	0	0	0	0	0	26	0
Total			52	0	3	0	0	0	0	0	55	0
Millonarios	2010	Primera A	19	0	15	0	0	0	0	0	34	0
Millonarios	2011	Primera A	7	0	10	0	0	0	0	0	17	0
Millonarios	2012	Primera A	19	1	10	0	6	0	0	0	35	1
Millonarios	2013	Primera A	36	0	10	0	5	0	0	0	51	0
Millonarios	2014	Primera A	26	3	6	0	2	0	0	0	34	0
Millonarios	2015	Primera A	1	0	5	0	0	0	0	0	6	0
