= 2001 Categoría Primera A season =

Football competition

Copa Mustang
- Season: 2001
- Champions: América de Cali (11th title)
- Copa Libertadores: América de Cali; Cortuluá; Once Caldas
- Matches: 378
- Goals: 927 (2.45 per match)
- Top goalscorer: Carlos Castro; Jorge Horacio Serna (29 goals each)

The 2001 Categoría Primera A season, named Copa Mustang 2001 for sponsoring purposes, was the 54th season of Colombia's top-flight football league. América de Cali were the defending champions and won their eleventh title and second in a row by beating Independiente Medellín in the finals.

== Format ==
The season was split into four stages: the first two stages were the Apertura and Finalización tournaments, in which the 16 teams were first divided into two groups of eight teams, playing seven games, and then all teams in the league played each other once for a total of 22 matches. The winners of each tournament earned a berth into the 2002 Copa Libertadores. The third stage was the semifinal round, which was played by the best eight teams of the aggregate table of both tournaments, who were divided into two groups of four according to their position in the aggregate table: odd-ranked teams made up Group A, while even-ranked ones made up Group B. The winners of each group played the double-legged finals to decide the champions of the season, who also qualified for the Copa Libertadores.

== Teams ==
Locations of the 2001 Categoría Primera A teams

Team	Home city	Stadium	Capacity
América de Cali	Cali	Pascual Guerrero	45,625
Atlético Bucaramanga	Bucaramanga	Alfonso López	28,000
Atlético Huila	Neiva	Guillermo Plazas Alcid	22,000
Atlético Nacional	Medellín	Atanasio Girardot	52,000
Cortuluá	Tuluá	Doce de Octubre	16,000
Deportes Tolima	Ibagué	Manuel Murillo Toro	28,100
Deportivo Cali	Cali	Pascual Guerrero	45,625
Deportivo Pasto	Pasto	Departamental Libertad	12,000
Deportivo Pereira	Pereira	Estadio Hernán Ramírez Villegas	30,313
Envigado	Envigado	Polideportivo Sur	11,000
Independiente Medellín	Medellín	Atanasio Girardot	52,000
Junior	Barranquilla	Metropolitano Roberto Meléndez	60,000
Millonarios	Bogotá	Nemesio Camacho El Campín	48,300
Once Caldas	Manizales	Palogrande	36,553
Real Cartagena	Cartagena	Pedro de Heredia	16,000
Santa Fe	Bogotá	Nemesio Camacho El Campín	48,300

== Torneo Apertura ==
The Torneo Apertura (also known as Copa Mustang I) began on 11 February and ended on 1 July.

=== Standings ===
Pos	Team	Pld	W	D	L	GF	GA	GD	Pts	Qualification
1	Cortuluá	22	12	6	4	30	19	+11	42	Qualification for the Copa Libertadores
2	Deportivo Cali	22	11	5	6	31	21	+10	38	
3	Once Caldas	22	11	5	6	35	27	+8	38	
4	Deportes Tolima	22	11	3	8	34	28	+6	36	
5	Independiente Medellín	22	9	7	6	40	25	+15	34	
6	Santa Fe	22	9	7	6	28	23	+5	34	
7	América de Cali	22	10	3	9	37	39	−2	33	
8	Junior	22	8	7	7	22	23	−1	31	
9	Millonarios	22	8	4	10	29	23	+6	28	
10	Envigado	22	7	7	8	26	30	−4	28	
11	Deportivo Pereira	22	8	3	11	26	34	−8	27	
12	Atlético Nacional	22	7	5	10	18	28	−10	26	
13	Real Cartagena	22	7	4	11	23	28	−5	25	
14	Atlético Huila	22	6	4	12	28	40	−12	22	
15	Atlético Bucaramanga	22	4	10	8	10	18	−8	22	
16	Deportivo Pasto	22	5	6	11	23	34	−11	21	

Source: RSSSF
Rules for classification: 1) Points, 2) Wins, 3) Goal difference, 4) Goals for, 5) Away goals for, 6) Away goals against, 7) Drawing of lots.

== Torneo Finalización ==
The Torneo Finalización (also known as Copa Mustang II) began on 5 August and ended on 11 November.

=== Standings ===
Pos	Team	Pld	W	D	L	GF	GA	GD	Pts	Qualification
1	Once Caldas	22	12	7	3	36	16	+20	43	Qualification for the Copa Libertadores
2	Millonarios	22	11	4	7	37	31	+6	37	
3	Atlético Nacional	22	10	7	5	30	18	+12	37	
4	Deportivo Cali	22	10	6	6	34	25	+9	36	
5	América de Cali	22	10	5	7	31	23	+8	35	
6	Deportivo Pasto	22	9	8	5	21	27	−6	35	
7	Envigado	22	9	6	7	37	36	+1	33	
8	Deportes Tolima	22	8	8	6	28	24	+4	32	
9	Santa Fe	22	9	2	11	29	29	0	29	
10	Independiente Medellín	22	8	5	9	24	23	+1	29	
11	Deportivo Pereira	22	7	5	10	19	31	−12	26	
12	Junior	22	6	7	9	27	29	−2	25	
13	Cortuluá	22	5	8	9	23	28	−5	23	
14	Real Cartagena	22	4	9	9	20	31	−11	21	
15	Atlético Huila	22	5	5	12	20	36	−16	20	
16	Atlético Bucaramanga	22	4	6	12	17	26	−9	18	

Source: RSSSF
Rules for classification: 1) Points, 2) Wins, 3) Goal difference, 4) Goals for, 5) Away goals for, 6) Away goals against, 7) Drawing of lots.

== Aggregate table ==
An aggregate table known as Reclasificación including the games of both tournaments (Apertura and Finalización) was used to determine the eight teams that would advance to the next stage of the tournament. The top eight teams in this table at the end of the Torneo Finalización advanced to the semifinals.

Pos	Team	Pld	W	D	L	GF	GA	GD	Pts	Qualification
1	Once Caldas	44	23	12	9	71	43	+28	81	Advance to the semifinals
2	Deportivo Cali	44	21	11	12	65	46	+19	74	Advance to the semifinals
3	América de Cali	44	20	8	16	68	62	+6	68	Advance to the semifinals
4	Deportes Tolima	44	19	11	14	62	52	+10	68	Advance to the semifinals
5	Millonarios	44	19	8	17	66	54	+12	65	Advance to the semifinals
6	Cortuluá	44	17	14	13	53	47	+6	65	Advance to the semifinals
7	Santa Fe	44	18	9	17	57	52	+5	63	Advance to the semifinals
8	Independiente Medellín	44	17	12	15	64	48	+16	63	Advance to the semifinals
9	Atlético Nacional	44	17	12	15	48	46	+2	63	
10	Envigado	44	16	13	15	63	66	−3	61	
11	Junior	44	14	14	16	49	52	−3	56	
12	Deportivo Pasto	44	14	14	16	44	61	−17	56	
13	Deportivo Pereira	44	15	8	21	45	65	−20	53	
14	Real Cartagena	44	11	13	20	43	59	−16	46	
15	Atlético Huila	44	11	9	24	48	76	−28	42	
16	Atlético Bucaramanga	44	8	16	20	27	44	−17	40	

Source: RSSSF
Rules for classification: 1) Points, 2) Wins, 3) Goal difference, 4) Goals for, 5) Away goals for, 6) Away goals against, 7) Drawing of lots.

== Semifinals ==
The third stage of the tournament consisted of two groups of four teams, with Group A including teams in odd-numbered positions and Group B including teams in even-numbered positions. The winners of each group qualified for the Finals.

=== Group A ===
Pos	Team	Pld	W	D	L	GF	GA	GD	Pts	Qualification	AME	ONC	SFE	MIL
1	América de Cali	6	2	4	0	8	5	+3	10	Advance to Finals	—	2–2	0–0	2–0
2	Once Caldas	6	2	3	1	10	10	0	9		2–2	—	0–2	1–0
3	Santa Fe	6	1	5	0	6	4	+2	8		1–1	2–2	—	1–1
4	Millonarios	6	0	2	4	3	8	−5	2		0–1	2–3	0–0	—

Source: RSSSF
Rules for classification: 1) Points, 2) Wins, 3) Goal difference, 4) Goals for, 5) Away goals for, 6) Away goals against, 7) Drawing of lots.

=== Group B ===
Pos	Team	Pld	W	D	L	GF	GA	GD	Pts	Qualification	DIM	COR	CAL	TOL
1	Independiente Medellín	6	3	2	1	9	5	+4	11	Advance to Finals	—	3–0	0–0	2–1
2	Cortuluá	6	3	1	2	5	5	0	10		1–0	—	1–0	2–0
3	Deportivo Cali	6	2	2	2	5	5	0	8		2–2	1–0	—	2–1
4	Deportes Tolima	6	1	1	4	5	9	−4	4		1–2	1–1	1–0	—

Source: RSSSF
Rules for classification: 1) Points, 2) Wins, 3) Goal difference, 4) Goals for, 5) Away goals for, 6) Away goals against, 7) Drawing of lots.

== Finals ==
Date	City	Home	Score	Away
December 16	Medellín	Independiente Medellín	0–1	América de Cali
December 19	Cali	América de Cali	2–0	Independiente Medellín
América de Cali won 3–0 on aggregate score.

== Top goalscorers ==
Rank	Name	Club	Goals
1	(Colombia) Carlos Castro	Millonarios	29
1	(Colombia) Jorge Horacio Serna	Independiente Medellín	29
3	(Colombia) Julián Vásquez	América de Cali	24
4	(Argentina) Sergio Galván Rey	Once Caldas	23
5	(Colombia) Iván Velásquez	Atlético Nacional	20

== Relegation ==
=== Relegation table ===
Pos	Team	Pld	Pts	Avg	Relegation
1	América de Cali	88	154	1.75	
2	Once Caldas	88	141	1.602	
3	Deportes Tolima	88	138	1.568	
4	Santa Fe	88	137	1.557	
5	Deportivo Cali	88	135	1.534	
6	Millonarios	88	134	1.523	
7	Junior	88	126	1.432	
8	Atlético Nacional	88	123	1.398	
9	Envigado	88	119	1.352	
10	Independiente Medellín	88	116	1.318	
11	Cortuluá	88	116	1.318	
12	Deportivo Pasto	88	106	1.205	
13	Deportivo Pereira	88	101	1.148	
14	Real Cartagena	88	97	1.102	
15	Atlético Huila	88	95	1.08	
16	Atlético Bucaramanga	88	88	1	Relegated to the Categoría Primera B

Rules for classification: 1st average; 2nd wins; 3rd goal difference; 4th number of goals scored; 5th away goals scored.

=== Promotion triangular ===
With the General Assembly of DIMAYOR having approved an expansion of the tournament from 16 to 18 teams starting from the 2002 season, a special promotion tournament was played at the end of the 2001 season. The two DIMAYOR affiliates that were taking part in Categoría Primera B at the time and failed to earn promotion (Cúcuta Deportivo and Unión Magdalena) were invited to compete, as well as Atlético Bucaramanga as the team that was relegated from Primera A at the end of the season. The top two teams of the triangular tournament were promoted. All matches were played at Estadio Pedro de Heredia in Cartagena.

Pos	Team	Pld	W	D	L	GF	GA	GD	Pts	Qualification
1	Unión Magdalena	2	2	0	0	4	0	+4	6	Promotion to Categoría Primera A
2	Atlético Bucaramanga	2	0	1	1	0	2	−2	1 (Note: Penalty shoot-out: Atlético Bucaramanga 5–3 Cúcuta Deportivo)	Promotion to Categoría Primera A
3	Cúcuta Deportivo	2	0	1	1	0	2	−2	1	

Source: RSSSF
Rules for classification: 1) Points, 2) Goal difference, 3) Goals for, 4) Penalty shoot-out.
