= Estadio Álvaro Gómez Hurtado =

Stadium in Floridablanca, Colombia

Estadio Álvaro Gómez Hurtado Álvaro Gómez Hurtado Stadium
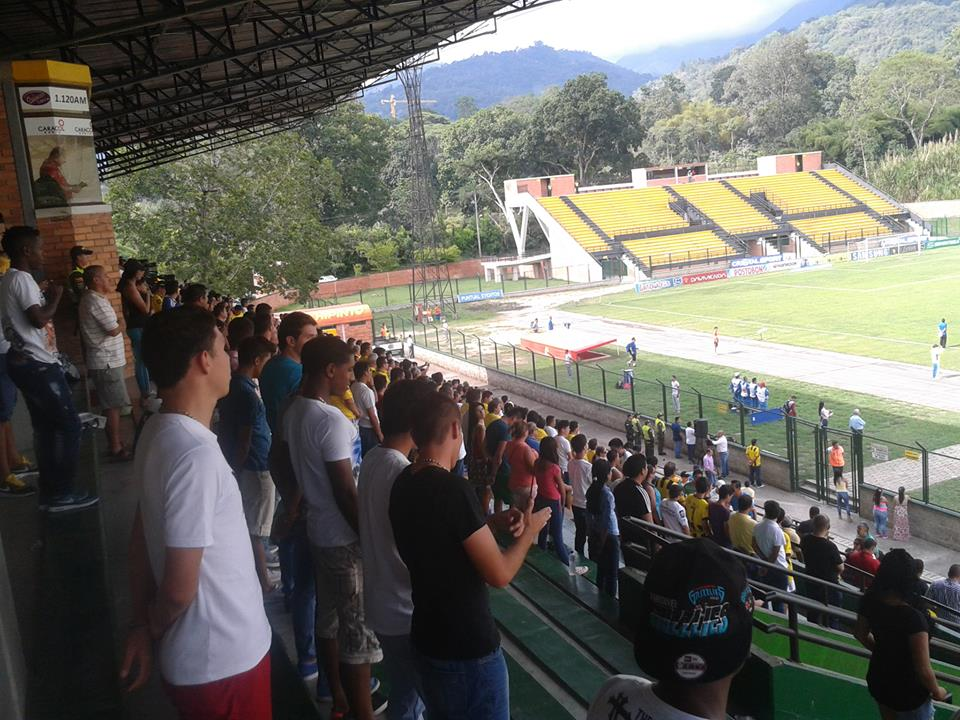
- Interactive map of Estadio Álvaro Gómez Hurtado; Álvaro Gómez Hurtado Stadium
- Location: Floridablanca, Colombia
- Coordinates: 7.0520°N 73.0809°W
- Owner: Floridablanca Municipality
- Capacity: 12,000
- Surface: Grass

Construction
- Opened: 1996
- Renovated: 2013

Tenants
- Atlético Bucaramanga (2016–2017, 2025); Atlético Bucaramanga (women) (2023, 2025); Real Santander (2006–2010, 2013–2017); Alianza Petrolera (2013–2015); Real Floridablanca (1996–1997)

Estadio Álvaro Gómez Hurtado is a football stadium located in the municipality of Floridablanca, department of Santander, Colombia. It is part of the Unidad Deportiva Álvaro Gómez Hurtado, which also includes an indoor coliseum with capacity for 2,000 spectators, used for sports such as indoor football, basketball, volleyball, and cheerleading, among other events that take place there.

== Characteristics ==
The construction and inauguration of the stadium (with the coliseum) took place in 1996 on the occasion of the 15th National Sports Games in the department of Santander, hosting the football competitions. The stadium and the Olympic village that houses it are named after the Colombian political leader Álvaro Gómez Hurtado, who was assassinated in Bogotá the previous year.

The stadium was the traditional home of Real Santander, a club in the second tier of Colombian professional football. From 2013 to early 2015, it hosted the home games of Alianza Petrolera in the Primera A, while its stadium Estadio Daniel Villa Zapata in Barrancabermeja was undergoing renovation works. The defunct Real Floridablanca team also played at this stadium in the 1997 and 1998 seasons of the Primera B.

The stadium initially had a capacity of 5,000 spectators accommodated in the western stand. After the construction of the north and south stands, its capacity was increased to 12,000 spectators, due to a remodeling done in 2013 on account of a financial contribution made by regional businessman Carlos Ardila Lülle, owner of the professional football team Atlético Nacional, with the aim that Alianza Petrolera (with which the Verdolaga team had a cooperation agreement) would play its home games in this stadium, making it suitable to host professional matches in the top flight.

After the stadium was renovated, the Santander department's trade unions proposed that the stadium be named after its benefactor, Carlos Ardila Lülle, to the detriment of the slain political leader. This was due to the $5.5 billion Colombian pesos contribution made by the businessman for the renovation and remodeling works.

In 2014, the lighting system was completed and the spaces for access to the stands were renovated. During 2016 and part of 2017, Atlético Bucaramanga, recently promoted to the top flight, played its home games in this venue. The club made a temporary return to the stadium for the 2025 season, due to refurbishment works that were being carried out at the Américo Montanini stadium in Bucaramanga.

== See also ==
- List of football stadiums in Colombia
