= Saeta (brand) =

Colombian sportswear company

Saeta International Sports Wear Ltda
- Type: Private
- Industry: Sportswear
- Founded: 1982
- Founder: Pedro Aníbal Carrero López
- Headquarters: Bogotá, Colombia
- Products: Footwear; Sportswear
- Website: www.saetasport.com

Saeta International Sport Wear is a Colombian company that operates its business in the textile sector, in the manufacture, import and export of sportswear and accessories.

== History ==
In 1982, Colombian businessman Pedro Aníbal Carrero López decided to acquire a loan to buy a machine to manufacture sweatshirts, and with an expert in making clothes and industrial designer started the company.

In 1988, Saeta tailored uniforms for 13 professional football teams in Colombia, which had the sponsorship of a prestigious beverage company, owned by one of the most important economic groups in the country. Saeta thus became the main supplier of sportswear at the national level.

In 1991, the distribution company of sportswear, Rydtex of Sweden, came to Colombia in search of new suppliers and learn about the quality of Saeta, carried out the orders. These orders were the first export of the company.

1998, becoming the sponsor of one of the most famous professional teams in the country, the brand reached a high level of recognition.

2001, co-sponsored negotiations with other major professional team, which is followed by active promotion of the company's flagship product.

== Sponsorship ==
SAETA has sponsored several Colombian professional soccer teams from Liga DIMAYOR and Torneo DIMAYOR.

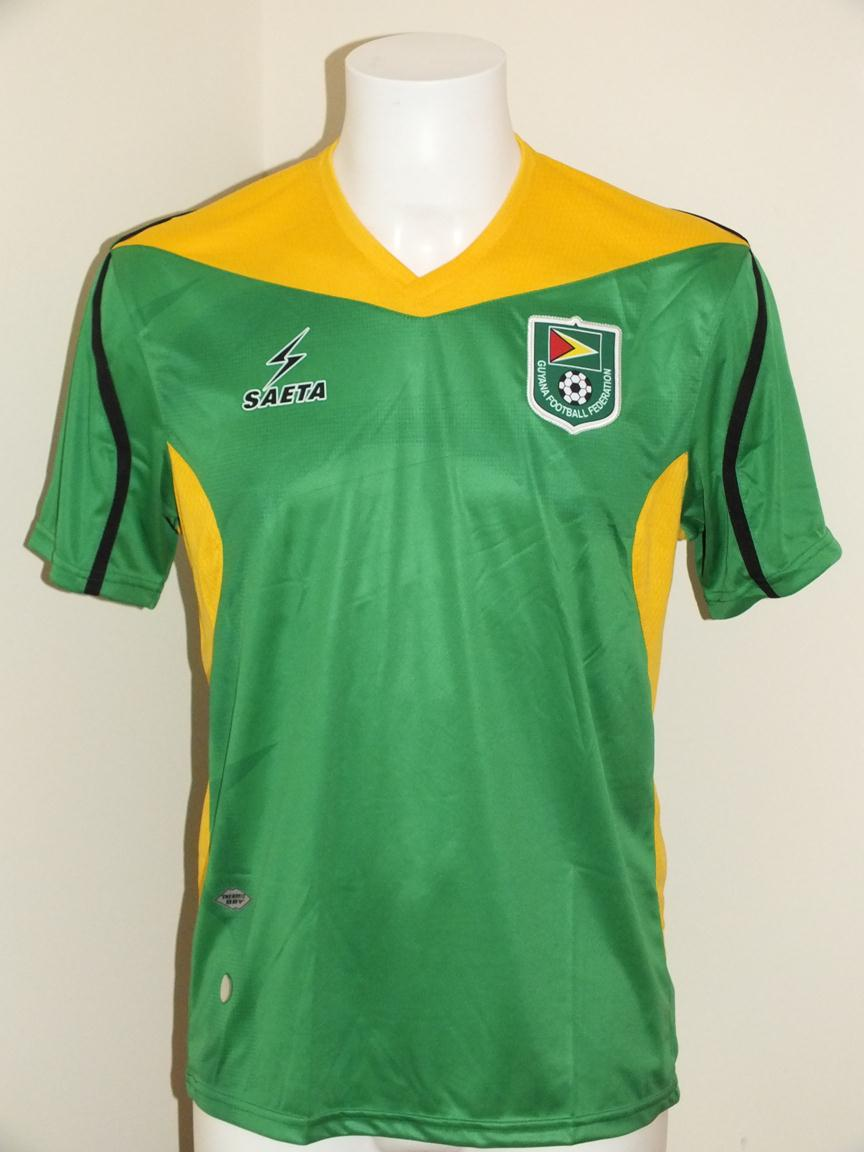
Official Guyana home shirt from 2012, made by Saeta.

=== National teams ===
- Haiti (2013–)

=== Club teams ===
- (Colombia) Once Caldas (2018–)
- (Colombia) Santa Fe (1983–1995)
- (Colombia) América de Cali (1991–1992) (2010)
- (Colombia) Cúcuta Deportivo (1999–2004) (2015– )
- (Colombia) Millonarios (2000–2002, 2005–2008)
- (Colombia) Real Cartagena (2005–2007, 2009–2010)
- (Colombia) Deportivo Pasto (2008)
- (Costa Rica) UCR (2018–)

=== Track & Field ===
==== National teams ====
- Colombia (2023–)
