= Valledupar F.C. =

Colombian football club

- Full name: Valledupar Fútbol Club
- Nickname(s): Los Caciques; Los Vallenatos
- Short name: VFC
- Founded: 15 November 2003; 21 years ago
- Dissolved: 22 June 2023; 2 years ago
- Ground: Estadio Armando Maestre Pavajeau
- Capacity: 11,000
- Chairman: Nicolás Baena
- League: Categoría Primera B
- 2022: Primera B, 13th of 16
- Website: www.valleduparfc.com
Home colours	Away colours

Valledupar Fútbol Club was a professional Colombian football team based in Valledupar, that last played in the Categoría Primera B, the second tier of Colombian professional football. They played their home games at the Estadio Armando Maestre Pavajeau.

== History ==
The club was founded on 15 November 2003 and entered Categoría Primera B in 2004, replacing Dimerco Real Popayán which was not allowed to compete for financial problems and folded at the end of 2003. In their first campaign in the Colombian second tier, Valledupar made it to the semifinal stage, in which they were eliminated from contention and played a controversial game on the final matchday against Real Cartagena, conceding four goals in the final five minutes of play to allow the latter side to qualify for the tournament's final.

Their early consistency was once again shown in the following season, in which they made it to the tournament's semifinals, but finished third in their group, while their best campaign in the second tier was the 2006 one, in which they reached the Apertura final, losing to La Equidad and later defeated the Finalización runners-up Cortuluá in the runners-up play-off to qualify for the promotion/relegation play-off against Atlético Huila, who defeated Valledupar over two legs to deny them promotion to Categoría Primera A.

In 2007, they reached the semifinals in both of the season's tournaments but failed to reach the final, whilst in 2008 they managed to advance to the Finalización's final series, in which they were defeated by Real Cartagena 3–2 on aggregate and missed the chance to play the season's grand final for promotion to the top flight. Since 2008 Valledupar have also taken part in the Copa Colombia, reaching the quarter-finals three times: in 2011 they were knocked out by Junior, in 2013 they lost to América de Cali at that stage of the competition, and in 2014, again losing to Junior.

Valledupar F.C. competed in Primera B until the first tournament of the 2023 season in which they advanced to the semifinal stage, placing third in their group. On 22 June 2023, and motivated by the lack of support from both the government and local private enterprises, the club's Board voted 4–1 to move the club to Soacha and rebrand it, effectively folding the existing club. The move was confirmed at a General Assembly of DIMAYOR held on 6 July 2023, and the club was eventually replaced by Real Soacha Cundinamarca.
