= Estadio Hernando Azcárate Martínez =

Stadium in Buga, Colombia

Coordinates: 3.8912°N 76.3006°W

Hernando Azcárate Martínez Olympic Stadium
- Estadio Olímpico Hernando Azcárate Martínez
- Location: Buga, Valle del Cauca, Colombia
- Owner: City of Buga
- Capacity: 8,000
- Surface: Grass
- Field size: 105 m × 68 m

Construction
- Opened: November 19, 1915
- Renovated: 1971

The Hernando Azcárate Martínez Olympic Stadium (Spanish: Estadio Olímpico Hernando Azcárate Martínez) is a multi-purpose stadium in Buga, in Colombia's Valle del Cauca department. It has a capacity of 8,000 spectators, split between an eastern and a western stand, and is named after Hernando Azcárate Martínez, a sports administrator who was a prominent figure in Buga and Valle del Cauca football for many years. It is considered the oldest football stadium still standing in the country. Over the years a number of clubs have used the ground as their home venue. It hosted Guadalajara de Buga for two seasons, between 1993 and 1994, and River Plate de Buga between 1995 and 1997.

== History ==
The Azcárate Martínez stadium opened in 1915 and was remodeled in 1971, when it served as a secondary venue for the football tournament of the 1971 Pan American Games, hosted mainly in nearby Cali. In 1995 it staged matches of the Categoría Primera B, with River Plate de Buga as the host club; that same season Cortuluá and Once Caldas of the Categoría Primera A also played some of their fixtures in the city. In 2000, Deportivo Pasto used the stadium as a home ground, and the last top-flight match played there took place during the 2010 Apertura tournament, when América de Cali beat Once Caldas 2–1.

In the first half of 2015, América de Cali again chose the stadium for its Categoría Primera B home matches, reasoning that the expected attendance and security requirements would be more manageable for the municipality to handle. Hosting the club required the municipal government and América de Cali to upgrade the locker rooms, substitute benches and stands.

The Azcárate Martínez stadium has been considered as the oldest football stadium still standing in the country; it opened on 19 November 1915 and remains the property of the city of Buga.

=== 1971 Pan American Games ===
Date	Phase	Team	Result	Team
31 July 1971	Group C	Haiti	1–1	Bermuda
1 August 1971	Group C	Argentina	3–0	United States
2 August 1971	Group C	Argentina	2–1	Bermuda
3 August 1971	Group C	United States	4–1	Bermuda
4 August 1971	Group C	United States	3–2	Haiti
5 August 1971	Group C	Argentina	1–1	Haiti
7 August 1971	Final round	Argentina	2–0	Canada

== See also ==
- List of football stadiums in Colombia
- 1971 Pan American Games
