= Estadio Departamental Libertad =

Stadium in Pasto, Colombia

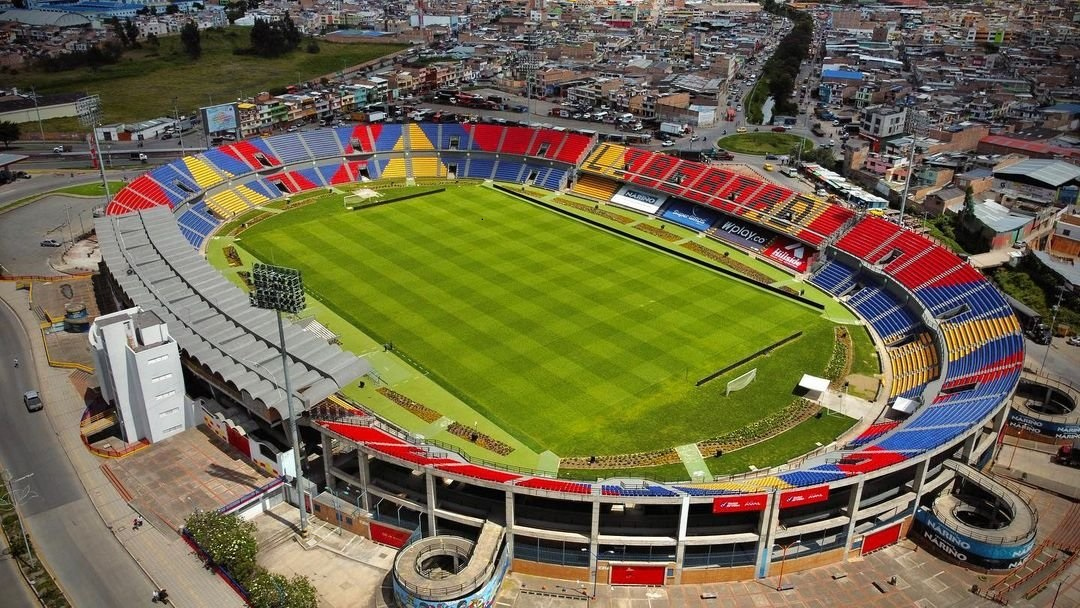
- The stadium in 2016
- Interactive map of Estadio Departamental Libertad
- Location: Pasto, Colombia
- Coordinates: 1°11′52.84″N 77°16′39.39″W
- Owner: Nariño Department
- Capacity: 20,000
- Surface: grass

Construction
- Opened: 1954; 72 years ago
- Renovated: 2000, 2007, 2019
- Expanded: 2007

Tenant
- Deportivo Pasto (1954–present)

Estadio Departamental Libertad is a multi-purpose stadium in Pasto, Colombia. It is used mostly for football matches and is the home stadium of Deportivo Pasto. The stadium holds 20,000 people and was built in 1955.

In 2007 Pasto qualified for the Copa Libertadores, so the stadium was expanded to fit CONMEBOL requirements. The north stand was expanded, which completed the bowl of the stadium and made every side two tiers since before the renovation the north side was semi-open and had only one tier.

In 2019, the seating rows were painted, the lighting was upgraded, the changing rooms were renovated, and a large TV screen was installed. Around $20 million COP were spent in the renovations, which ended in December 2019.

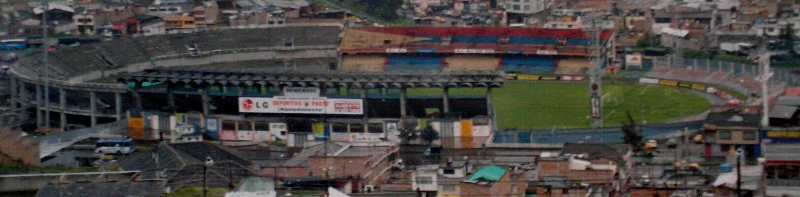
Panoramic of the stadium before the 2007 renovation
