= Categoría Primera C =

Colombian professional league for association football clubs

- Organising body: DIFUTBOL
- Founded: 1991 (As Amateur tier); 2021 (Refounded)
- Country: Colombia
- Number of clubs: Variable (192 in 2025)
- Level on pyramid: 3
- Promotion to: Categoría Primera B (Planned)
- Domestic cup(s): Copa Colombia (Planned)
- Current champions: Equipo Azul (2nd title) (2025)
- Most championships: Millonarios B América de Cali B Total Soccer; Equipo Azul (2 titles each)
- Website: difutbol.org
- Current: 2026

The Categoría Primera C is the third division tournament of football in Colombia, which is amateur in nature. It is organized by the División Aficionada del Fútbol Colombiano (Difútbol), an entity dependent on the Colombian Football Federation (FCF). Despite being called Primera C and being within the federative football system, it does not grant promotion to the professional Primera B, which is organized by the División Mayor del Fútbol Profesional Colombiano (Dimayor). According to a study made in 2020, Colombia was the only country in the top 20 of the FIFA ranking lacking a third tier football league linked to its league system. The current champion is Equipo Azul from Valledupar, who won the 2024 and 2025 tournaments.

== History ==
=== Early years ===
In 1990, Dimayor created the second division in Colombia, and at the same time the need for the new tournament to have relegation to a lower tier arose, making way for the creation of a third division league. In 1991 the Primera C began with the participation of amateur teams and affiliate or reserve squads of professional teams, proposed by Dimayor.

In all editions, the teams were divided into regional groups, each region had its semifinal and final and at the end each zone had a representative for a final stage, which was played at a single venue. The first champion of the competition was the reserve squad of Millonarios, after finishing first in the final stage, however for the first edition there was no promotion. In the event that a Dimayor affiliate club won the title, the winning team had to sell or transfer its berth in the second tier. This situation occurred in 1993, when the Unión Magdalena reserve team won the competition and was able to claim promotion by switching its license and creating the Deportivo Samarios club that played in the second tier in 1994. In 1996 and 1998, the América de Cali youth squads won the competition and in both cases América yielded its spot in Primera B, with Atlético Buenaventura being the team promoted to the second tier for 1997 and Palmira F.C. renting the berth to take part in Primera B in 1999.

The Primera C was the starting place for teams that are currently competing in Primera A and Primera B such as Deportivo Pasto and La Equidad. The competition was played uninterruptedly and with high amounts of clubs ranging from 66 to 185. It is commonly stated that Chicó Fútbol Club was promoted to Primera B after winning the 2000 Primera C tournament, but actually Cortuluá, who owned a Primera B license they had previously bought from América de Cali, granted them their spot to compete in Primera B, replacing Unión Meta who had played in the 2000 Primera B with that license. The champion of the 2000 edition was actually El Cerrito F.C.

The problems started in 1999, when representatives of the professional tiers started expressing their opposition to a professional team (affiliated to Dimayor) becoming an amateur team upon relegation to Primera C, while power struggles between Dimayor and Difútbol also began to rise. In 2001, with the tournament already weakened, the reserves of Independiente Medellín were the champions, and the solution regarding promotion was to hold a Primera B tournament mixed with a tournament for reserve teams of Primera A clubs for 2002. Starting from the following year, promotion and relegation between the second and third division ended.

Nevertheless, Difútbol continued to organize the tournament until 2010, but without awarding promotion to the champion. There were several attempts to resume the third division but no agreement was reached with Dimayor. In 2014, after many unsuccessful attempts Difútbol created a under-23 tournament with 10 teams trying to emulate the third tier, but no agreement was reached with the professional branch of Colombian football.

=== Possible return for 2020 and reversal ===
After an extraordinary assembly of clubs of Dimayor held on 12 December 2017, the former president of the professional branch of Colombian football, Jorge Perdomo, stated that the Primera C could be resumed within two or three years, based on clubs from the U-20 Championship of the FCF and youth squads of the 36 clubs affiliated to Dimayor, with an investment of roughly four billion pesos.

For the 2019 SuperCopa Juvenil FCF a promotion and relegation system would be established between the U-20 A and B categories, with the participation of 60 clubs in category A and relegation of the bottom 10 teams to category B and promotion of the top 10 teams of this category, in order to establish in the future the professional Primera C competition in 2020 with promotion to Categoría Primera B.

All of the above was approved by Perdomo, but when Jorge Enrique Vélez was appointed as president of Dimayor in 2019, he ruled out the option to reactivate the third division due to the high costs it would present.

=== Other proposals for reactivation ===
Former footballer and lawyer Andrés Felipe Guapacha, who played for Deportivo Pereira, Deportes Quindío, Envigado, Deportivo Pasto and La Paz F.C. (Bolivia), led the creation of the Association of Colombian Amateur Football Clubs (ACCFA) in 2020 in order to promote the creation of a third tier competition as a semi-professional category and establish in the future promotion and relegation between Primera B and Primera C, as well as the creation of a fourth tier or "Primera D" and also a fifth tier, aiming at defending the participation rights of amateur clubs in Colombia. According to this proposal, by 2024 there would be a third division league with 84 amateur teams and 36 subsidiaries of professional teams; the fourth division, a under-22 league, would have 270 teams playing for 10 promotion spots to Primera C. The fifth division, which would be under-21, would be open to every team able to pay the registration fee which would play for 40 promotion berths.

On the other hand, Jesús Alberto Ramírez, a highly experienced sports administrator, submitted to the Colombian Football Federation a proposal named Fútbol Naranja, planning to set up five tiers in the league pyramid and going up from 36 professional football clubs to 240, thus allowing the number of professional players to increase from 900 to over 12,000, all of this considering that out of Colombia's 1,125 municipalities, only 25 of them are currently represented by professional clubs.

Another proposal, led by Daniel Pabón and Hernando Arias and presented to the Chamber of Representatives of Colombia, included the creation of three additional tiers in the country. The Primera C would function as a semi-professional category and would be made up by 24 teams, a Primera D with 80 teams and a "Primera E" organized by the 34 departmental leagues whose number of participants would range between 272 and 680 depending on the teams registered in each department. The requirements would include having a stadium seating 4,000 spectators for the third tier, 2,000 for the fourth one and 1,000 for the fifth one. Furthermore, it was proposed to award 10 spots to 10 municipalities "of footballing importance" without professional teams such as Quibdó, Tumaco, Sincelejo, Yopal, Popayán, Riohacha, Buenaventura, Apartadó, Mocoa and Florencia.

=== Return in 2021 ===
In 2021, Difútbol confirmed the return of the Categoría Primera C under the name Torneo Interclubes Primera C. On 12 April 2021, the organization opened the signup process for the tournament which would begin on 15 May, but its beginning was postponed until July. It was intended that the winner of the Primera C competition took part in Primera B in 2022 as a guest team, with two promotions and two relegations to come into force by 2023. However, the DIMAYOR member clubs still had to approve promotion and relegation between Primera B and Primera C. The first edition of the refounded tournament was won by Filipenses from Turbo, Antioquia Department, who defeated Unión Pacífico Sur from Tumaco in the final.

A project for the implementation of a Primera C competition linked to the professional tiers was approved at the general assembly of the Colombian Football Federation (FCF) held on 11 March 2025. The project, presented by professional club Llaneros, aimed at establishing promotion and relegation between the proposed third tier and the second tier league Categoría Primera B starting from 2026, with the FCF's Executive Committee being left in charge of designing the administrative and technical guidelines for its implementation.

In August 2025, FCF chairman Ramón Jesurún along with his Dimayor and Difútbol counterparts confirmed their interest in the creation of a professional third tier competition, and informed that they were aiming to start the competition within two years with the top 16 clubs from the current amateur tournament while also stating that there were still logistical and financial challenges to be sorted out. Three months later, Difútbol chairman Álvaro González Alzate stated that there was a pilot in works in which the champion and runner-up of the 2026 Primera C competition would be invited to compete in the 2027 Primera B as guest teams, and a system of promotion and relegation between both tiers would be developed depending on the performance of these teams in the second tier competition.

== Champions by seasons ==
| Season | Champion (Title count) | Runner-up |
Categoría Primera C (Dimayor/Difútbol)
| 1991 | Millonarios B (1) | Deportes Dinastía |
| 1993 | Unión Magdalena B (1) | América de Cali B |
| 1994 | Ferroclub (1) | Millonarios B |
| 1995–96 | Cooperamos Tolima (1) | La Equidad |
| 1996 | América de Cali B (1) | Milán FC |
| 1997 | Escuela Carlos Sarmiento Lora (1) | América de Cali B |
| 1998 | América de Cali B (2) | Junior B |
| 1999 | Deportivo Pereira B (1) | La Equidad |
| 2000 | El Cerrito F.C. (1) | Atlético Bucaramanga B |
| 2001 | Independiente Medellín B (1) | Deportivo Pereira B |
Torneo Interclubes Primera C (Difútbol)
| 2002 | Expreso Rojo (1) | Once Caldas B |
| 2003 | Once Caldas B (1) | Millonarios B |
| 2004 | Deportivo Cali B (1) | Escuela Carlos Sarmiento Lora |
| 2006 | Paz y Futuro (1) | Deportivo Cali B |
| 2007 | Boca Juniors de Soledad (1) | Alianza Llanos |
| 2008 | Millonarios B (2) | Palmares FC |
| 2009 | Palmarés FC (1) | Boca Juniors de Sincelejo |
| 2010 | EHC Gobernación - Electrohuila (1) | Uniautónoma |
Torneo Nacional de Interclubes Primera C (Difútbol)
| 2021 | Filipenses (1) | Unión Pacífico Sur |
| 2022 | Total Soccer (1) | Equipo Azul |
| 2023 | Total Soccer (2) | Ciamen |
| 2024 | Equipo Azul (1) | Tigres B |
| 2025 | Equipo Azul (2) | La Cantera |

Source for winners until 2010: Diario La Patria
