= Categoría Primera B =

Colombian association football league

Torneo BetPlay Dimayor
- Organising body: DIMAYOR
- Founded: January 29, 1991; 35 years ago
- Country: Colombia
- Confederation: CONMEBOL
- Number of clubs: 16
- Level on pyramid: 2
- Promotion to: Liga DIMAYOR
- Domestic cup: Copa Colombia
- Current champions: Cúcuta Deportivo (4th title) (2025–II)
- Most championships: Atlético Huila; Cúcuta Deportivo (4 titles each)
- Broadcasters: Win Sports; Win+ Fútbol
- Website: dimayor.com.co
- Current: 2026 season

The Torneo DIMAYOR, referred to as Torneo BetPlay Dimayor due to sponsorship by online betting company BetPlay, is the second-division football league in Colombia. The tournament was inaugurated on 29 January 1991.

== Format ==
Since 2015, the league is played with 16 teams due to the expansion to 20 teams in the Primera A tournament. For the first two years following that change there was a single year-round tournament, but in 2017 it changed back to the Apertura and Finalización system.

The league is played under the following structure:

	Format	Qualification of winner
Torneo I	First stage: Single round-robin tournament (15 or 16 games per team) (Note: In some seasons an extra round of local derbies is played, bringing the total of first stage games per team to 16.), the top eight teams advance to the semi-finals.; Semi-finals: The eight teams are drawn into two groups of four, each group is played under a double round-robin system, the winner of each group advances to the finals.; Final: A two-legged series.	Grand Final
Torneo II	First stage: Single round-robin tournament (15 or 16 games per team) with the same fixture as the Torneo I but reversed home-and-away order, the top eight teams advance to the semi-finals.; Semi-finals: The eight teams are drawn into two groups of four, each group is played under a double round-robin system, the winner of each group advances to the finals.; Final: A two-legged series.	Grand Final
Grand Final	The winners of both of the season's tournaments play each other in a two-legged final.	Promotion to Liga DIMAYOR
Promotion play-off	The Grand Final loser plays the aggregate table's top team in a two-legged series.	Promotion to Liga DIMAYOR

=== Promotion ===
Two teams are promoted from the second tier to the top-tier league at the end of each season. Starting from 2025, the two promoted teams are decided under the following scenarios:

- If one team wins both of the season's short tournaments (Torneo I and II), it earns promotion to the top flight and a two-legged promotion play-off series is played by the next two teams in the season's aggregate table to decide the other promoted team.
- If both of the short tournament winners place in the top two of the aggregate table at the end of the season, both teams will be promoted to the top flight and no additional stages are played.
- If only one of the short tournament winners places in the top two of the aggregate table, it will be promoted while the other tournament winner will play the promotion play-off against the best-placed team in the aggregate table that did not win any of the season's tournaments.
- If none of the short tournament winners ends up in the top two places of the aggregate table, both teams will play a grand final in which the winning side will be the first promoted team, and the loser of that grand final will go on to play the aggregate table's top team in the promotion play-off for the remaining promotion berth.

== Current teams ==
Teams for the 2026 season

Team	City	Stadium	Capacity	Head Coach
Atlético F.C.	Cali	Pascual Guerrero	38,000	(Colombia) Andrés Sicachá
Barranquilla F.C.	Barranquilla	Romelio Martínez	11,000	(Colombia) Dayron Pérez
Boca Juniors de Cali	Cali	Pascual Guerrero	38,000	(Colombia) José Manuel Rodríguez
Bogotá F.C.	Bogotá	Metropolitano de Techo	10,000	(Colombia) Sebastián Botero
Deportes Quindío	Armenia	Centenario	21,500	(Colombia) Harold Rivera
Envigado F.C.	Envigado	Polideportivo Sur	11,000	(Colombia) Alberto Suárez
Independiente Valle del Cauca	Palmira	Francisco Rivera Escobar	15,300	(Ecuador) Nicolás Serrano
Independiente Valle del Cauca	Palmira	Deportivo Cali	42,000	(Ecuador) Nicolás Serrano
Internacional F.C. de Palmira	Palmira	Francisco Rivera Escobar	15,300	(Colombia) Nelson Flórez
Itagüí Leones F.C.	Itagüí	Metropolitano Ciudad de Itagüí	12,000	(Colombia) Alejandro Arboleda
Orsomarso S.C.	Yumbo	Municipal Raúl Miranda	3,500	(Colombia) Mauricio Arquez
Patriotas Boyacá	Tunja	La Independencia	20,630	(Colombia) Carlos Giraldo
Real Cartagena	Cartagena	Jaime Morón León	16,068	(Colombia) Álvaro Hernández
Real Cundinamarca	Mosquera	Municipal de Mosquera	5,440	(Colombia) Diego Mazo
Real Santander	Piedecuesta	Villa Concha	5,500	(Colombia) Óscar Álvarez
Tigres F.C.	Bogotá	Metropolitano de Techo	10,000	(Colombia) Rafael Rodríguez
Unión Magdalena	Santa Marta	Sierra Nevada	16,000	(Colombia) Carlos Silva

== Seasons by club ==
This is the complete list of the clubs that have taken part in the Categoría Primera B, founded in 1991, until the 2026 season. Teams who currently play are indicated in bold.

- **35** seasons: **Itagüí Leones (Deportivo Rionegro)**
- **26** seasons: **Real Cartagena**
- **23** seasons: **Bogotá**
- **23** seasons: **Tigres (Expreso Rojo)**
- **22** seasons: Alianza Petrolera
- **22** seasons: **Atlético (Dépor, Dépor Aguablanca, Dépor Jamundí)**
- **22** seasons: **Barranquilla**
- **20** seasons: **Real Santander (Real San Andrés)**
- **20** seasons: Valledupar
- **19** seasons: **Unión Magdalena**
- **18** seasons: Cúcuta Deportivo (Cúcuta 2001)
- **17** seasons: Cortuluá
- **14** seasons: **Deportes Quindío**
- **14** seasons: Girardot
- **13** seasons: Bello (Atlético Bello)
- **13** seasons: Deportivo Antioquia (Itagüí, Florida Soccer)
- **13** seasons: El Cóndor (Cóndor Real Bogotá)
- **13** seasons: Llaneros
- **12** seasons: **Patriotas**
- **11** seasons: Deportivo Pereira
- **11** seasons: Fortaleza
- **11** seasons: **Orsomarso**
- **9** seasons: Atlético Huila
- **9** seasons: Centauros Villavicencio
- **8** seasons: Academia
- **8** seasons: Atlético Bucaramanga
- **8** seasons: **Boca Juniors de Cali**
- **8** seasons: Lanceros (Lanceros Fair Play)
- **8** seasons: Universitario Popayán
- **7** seasons: Alianza Llanos
- **7** seasons: Boyacá Chicó (Bogotá Chicó)
- **5** seasons: Academia Bogotana
- **5** seasons: América de Cali
- **5** seasons: Atlético Buenaventura
- **5** seasons: Bajo Cauca
- **5** seasons: Cooperamos Tolima
- **5** seasons: Deportivo Pasto
- **5** seasons: Escuela Carlos Sarmiento Lora
- **5** seasons: Pumas de Casanare
- **4** seasons: Atlético Córdoba
- **4** seasons: Chía (Chía Fair Play, Club Fair Play)
- **4** seasons: La Equidad
- **4** seasons: **Real Cundinamarca**
- **3** seasons: Atlético Juventud (Juventud Soacha)
- **3** seasons: Palmira F.C.
- **3** seasons: Córdoba
- **3** seasons: Deportivo Unicosta
- **3** seasons: **Envigado**
- **3** seasons: Expreso Palmira
- **3** seasons: Fiorentina
- **3** seasons: Independiente Popayán
- **3** seasons: **Internacional de Palmira**
- **3** seasons: Itagüí Ditaires
- **3** seasons: Jaguares
- **3** seasons: Uniautónoma
- **2** seasons: Atlético de la Sabana
- **2** seasons: Soledad
- **2** seasons: Deportes Dinastía
- **2** seasons: Deportivo Armenia
- **2** seasons: Dimerco Popayán
- **2** seasons: El Cerrito
- **2** seasons: Guadalajara de Buga
- **2** seasons: Industrial Itagüí
- **2** seasons: Johann
- **2** seasons: Pacífico
- **2** seasons: Real Floridablanca
- **2** seasons: Real Sincelejo
- **2** seasons: River Plate
- **2** seasons: Unión Soacha
- **1** season: América de Cali B
- **1** season: Atlético Barranquilla
- **1** season: Atlético Huila B
- **1** season: Atlético Nacional B
- **1** season: Atlético Popayán
- **1** season: Cartago
- **1** season: Cortuluá B
- **1** season: Deportes Palmira
- **1** season: Deportes Risaralda
- **1** season: Deportes Tolima
- **1** season: Deportes Tolima B
- **1** season: Deportivo Cali B
- **1** season: Deportivo Pereira B
- **1** season: Deportivo Samarios
- **1** season: Independiente Medellín B
- **1** season: **Independiente Valle del Cauca (Independiente Yumbo)**
- **1** season: Junior B
- **1** season: Millonarios B
- **1** season: Once Caldas B
- **1** season: Real Cartagena B
- **1** season: Santa Fe B
- **1** season: Santa Rosa
- **1** season: Sucre
- **1** season: Unión Meta
- **1** season: Univalle

== List of champions ==
Season	Champion (Title count)	Runner-up
1991	Envigado (1)	Alianza Llanos
1992	Atlético Huila (1)	Alianza Llanos
1993	Cortuluá (1)	Fiorentina de Florencia
1994	Deportes Tolima (1)	Deportivo Antioquia
1995	Atlético Bucaramanga (1)	Lanceros Boyacá
1995–96	Cúcuta Deportivo (1)	Girardot
1996–97	Deportivo Unicosta (1)	Lanceros Boyacá
1997	Atlético Huila (2)	Cúcuta Deportivo
1998	Deportivo Pasto (1)	Deportivo Pereira
1999	Real Cartagena (1)	Itagüí
2000	Deportivo Pereira (1)	Unión Magdalena
2001	Deportes Quindío (1)	Deportivo Rionegro
2002	Centauros Villavicencio (1)	Alianza Petrolera
2003	Bogotá Chicó (1)	Pumas de Casanare
2004	Real Cartagena (2)	Deportivo Antioquia
2005	Cúcuta Deportivo (2)	Bajo Cauca
2006	La Equidad (1)	Valledupar
2007	Envigado (2)	Academia
2008	Real Cartagena (3)	Deportivo Rionegro
2009	Cortuluá (2)	Atlético Bucaramanga
2010	Itagüí Ditaires (1)	Deportivo Pasto
2011	Deportivo Pasto (2)	Patriotas
2012	Alianza Petrolera (1)	América de Cali
2013	Uniautónoma (1)	Fortaleza
2014	Jaguares de Córdoba (1)	Deportes Quindío
2015	Atlético Bucaramanga (2)	Fortaleza
2016	América de Cali (1)	Tigres
2017	Boyacá Chicó (2)	Leones
2018	Cúcuta Deportivo (3)	Unión Magdalena
2019	Deportivo Pereira (2)	Boyacá Chicó
2020	Atlético Huila (3)	Cortuluá
2021–I (Note: Due to the impact of the COVID-19 pandemic in Colombia, DIMAYOR decided to suspend promotion and relegation in the 2020 season. As a result of this situation, it was agreed that the 2021–I tournament champion would face the 2020 Primera B tournament champion in a double-legged series (Grand Final) to decide one promoted team, which was also considered a tournament champion. The 2021–I tournament featured two champions: Deportes Quindío as 2021–I tournament champion and Atlético Huila as Grand Final 2021–I champion.)	Deportes Quindío (Note: Champion of the 2021–I Categoría Primera B.) (2)	Cortuluá
2021–I	Atlético Huila (Note: Champion of the 2021–I Categoría Primera B Grand Final.) (4)	Deportes Quindío
2021–II	Unión Magdalena (1)	Cortuluá
2022	Boyacá Chicó (3)	Atlético Huila
2023	Patriotas (1)	Fortaleza
2024	Unión Magdalena (2)	Llaneros
2025–I (Note: The regulations for the 2025 season originally considered a final series between the winners of the season's short tournaments. However, since the Torneo I winners Jaguares also placed as one of the top two teams in the aggregate table, they were automatically promoted and the grand final to decide a single season champion was not held.)	Jaguares (2)	Patriotas
2025–II	Cúcuta Deportivo (4)	Real Cundinamarca

== Titles by club ==
As of 2 December 2025

Club	Titles	Runners-up	Seasons won	Seasons runner-up
Atlético Huila	4	1	1992, 1997, 2020, 2021	2022
Cúcuta Deportivo	4	1	1995–96, 2005, 2018, 2025–II	1997
Boyacá Chicó	3	1	2003, 2017, 2022	2019
Real Cartagena	3	—	1999, 2004, 2008	—
Cortuluá	2	3	1993, 2009	2020, 2021–I, 2021–II
Unión Magdalena	2	2	2021–II, 2024	2000, 2018
Atlético Bucaramanga	2	1	1995, 2015	2009
Deportivo Pasto	2	1	1998, 2011	2010
Deportivo Pereira	2	1	2000, 2019	1998
Deportes Quindío	2	1	2001, 2021–I	2014
Envigado	2	—	1991, 2007	—
Jaguares	2	—	2014, 2025–I	—
Patriotas	1	2	2023	2011, 2025–I
Alianza Petrolera	1	1	2012	2002
América de Cali	1	1	2016	2012
Centauros Villavicencio	1	—	2002	—
Deportes Tolima	1	—	1994	—
Deportivo Unicosta	1	—	1996–97	—
Itagüí Ditaires	1	—	2010	—
La Equidad	1	—	2006	—
Uniautónoma	1	—	2013	—
