= Estadio Francisco Rivera Escobar =

Colombian football stadium

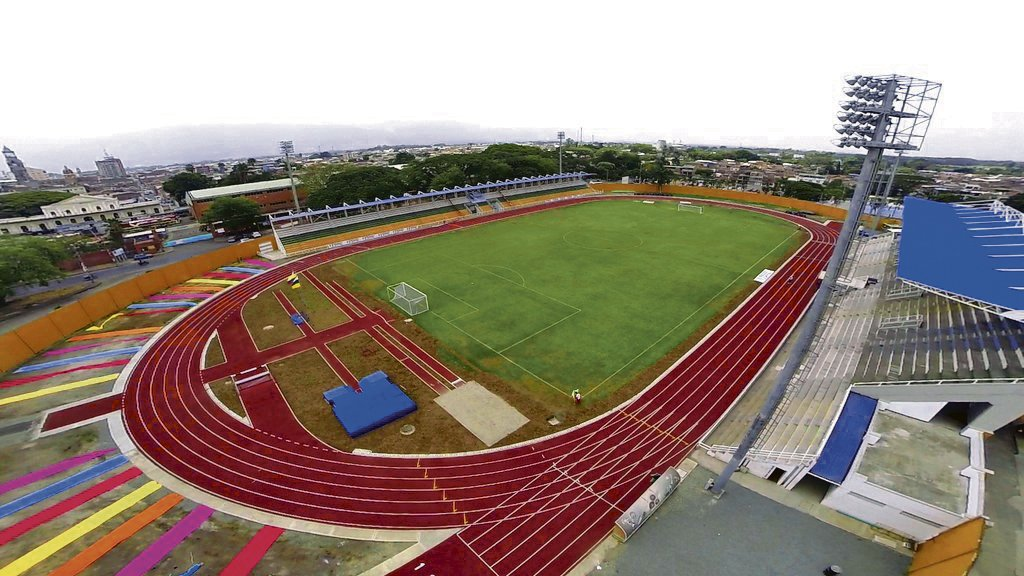
- The stadium in 2015, prior to its most recent remodeling
- Interactive map of Estadio Francisco Rivera Escobar
- Location: Palmira, Colombia
- Coordinates: 3.526389°N 76.306389°W
- Owner: Municipality of Palmira
- Capacity: 15,300
- Surface: grass

Construction
- Built: 1950
- Renovated: 2012, 2015, 2017–2019

Tenants
- Orsomarso (2016–2024); Inter Palmira (2024–)

Estadio Francisco Rivera Escobar is a multi-use stadium in Palmira, Colombia. It is used mostly for football matches. The stadium has a capacity of 15,300 people. Local club Inter Palmira plays its home matches at this stadium, with Orsomarso being a tenant from 2016 to 2024.

== History ==
The stadium was built in the first years of the decade of the 1950s, and was named after Francisco Rivera Escobar, a physician from the town who performed several civic functions in the 1940s and 1950s, being mayor, chairman of the municipal council, and commander of the fire department.

Although the stadium has been primarily used by teams from Palmira that have played in the second-tier competition Categoría Primera B such as Palmira F.C. (1992–1994), Univalle (1998), Expreso Palmira (1999–2001), Deportes Palmira (2009), and Orsomarso (2016–2024), it has also served as an alternate home stadium for the teams from the neighbouring Cali when Estadio Olímpico Pascual Guerrero has been unavailable, with América de Cali using it for the first time in 1954 for their league campaign. América used the stadium again in 2000 and 2011, as Estadio Pascual Guerrero was closed for remodeling works ahead of the 2001 Copa América and the 2011 FIFA U-20 World Cup, respectively.

In recent years, the stadium has undergone several remodeling works aimed at upgrading its infrastructure, starting from 2012 when it was structurally reinforced and its eastern stand was demolished and rebuilt. An athletic track was installed in 2015, ahead of the Department Games which were hosted by the city that year. In 2017, the stadium underwent further remodeling and expansion works with the construction of the north and south stands, which increased its capacity from 9,000 to 15,300 spectators. In addition to that, the installation of seating and the construction of media booths, press room, commercial areas, VIP room, sound system, elevator for the western stand, and the improvement of dressing rooms, access facilities for disabled people, and sanitary batteries were carried out. The stadium's lighting system was upgraded in 2019.

The stadium also served as a venue for the 2021 Junior Pan American Games, hosting the archery competitions.
