= Estadio Doce de Octubre =

Colombian football stadium

- Interactive map of Estadio Doce de Octubre
- Location: Tuluá, Colombia
- Coordinates: 4.0748914°N 76.2015796°W
- Capacity: 16,000
- Surface: grass

Construction
- Opened: 1967

Tenant
- Cortuluá

Estadio Doce de Octubre is a multi-use stadium in Tuluá, Colombia. It is used mostly for football matches. The stadium has a capacity of 16,000 people and was built in 1967. Cortuluá plays its home matches at this stadium.
