= Centauros Villavicencio =

- Full name: Corporación Deportiva; Centauros Villavicencio
- Nickname: Los Indomables (The Indomitables)
- Founded: 14 January 2002
- Dissolved: 20 May 2011
- Ground: Manuel Calle Lombana; Villavicencio, Colombia
- Capacity: 15,000
- Chairman: Jesús M. Suárez
- Manager: Nelson Abadia Aragon
- League: Primera B Colombia
- 2008 Apertura: 14th
Home colours	Away colours	Third colours

Corporación Deportiva Centauros Villavicencio, was a Colombian football club based in the city of Villavicencio. The club was founded on 14 January 2003 and played its home games at the Manuel Calle Lombana stadium, which has a capacity of 15,000 seats.

== History ==
The club was founded on 14 January 2002 and abolished the rise in the first season immediately on from the second division to the Categoría Primera A. On 2 February 2003 completed the club's 1–1 draw against Deportivo Pasto his first game in the highest Colombian league. The season was very successful for the novice. In the end of this season, they reached the fourth place and thus even the qualification of the Cuadrangulares, Colombian Championship Playoffs. There Villavicencio failed due to the other teams. All the more surprising after this successful first round, followed in the Torneo Finalizacion the total crash. The club was standing with Atletico Bucaramanga and Deportivo Tuluá level on points at the last place in the table, but increased due to the poor goal difference again in the second division. In the Primera B reached the team in 2004 the third place, but failed in the rise of games. The team belonging to the Panamanian Blas Pérez, was thereby leading scorer with 29 goals this season. In the second half of the 2006 season, the first round in 2007 and 2008 and in the second round in 2009 Villavicencio also failed in their respective career games. In May 2011, Centauros moved from Villavicencio to Popayán considering its huge debts, the refusal of financial support from successive local authorities that deemed it a feeder club for Deportes Quindío, and the support expressed from the Cauca Department Governorate for a football club in the department's capital city, thus becoming Universitario Popayán.

== Uniform ==
- Home: Sky blue shirt, dark blue shorts and dark blue socks.
- Away: Dark green shirt, dark green shorts and white socks.
- Third: White shirt, white shorts and white socks.
- 2002–2003: For the climb championship which leaves champion and during his year in first division, wore a white uniform with three vertical stripes of the colors of the flag of Villavicencio, red shorts and socks sky, the color of the pants could also be white, or green, depending on the opponent, and it also changed the color of his socks.
- 2004–2007: Used light green color for local matches and sky blue color for away matches, although some matches celebrated at home with the blue.
- 2008: Used as local blue sky color and alternate with white color.
- 2009: Sponsored by the government of the province of Meta is changed to dark green for shirts and shorts, with white or dark green socks, all-white as an alternative.
- 2010: Used for local all-white and alternate with sky blue shirt with dark blue shorts and dark blue socks.
- 2011: Repeat the clothing of the 2009, and is registered with the Dimayor a third uniform with sky blue shirt, dark blue shorts and dark blue socks.

=== Home ===
2002–2003	Lusti 2004–2007	Lusti 2008	Saeta 2009	Sheffy 2010–2011	Saeta 2011

=== Away ===
Lusti 2004–2007	Lusti 2008	Saeta 2009	Sheffy 2010–2011

=== Kit manufacturer ===
Period	Kit Manufacturer
2004–2008	Lusti
2009	Saeta
2010	Sheffy
2011	Saeta/Sheffy

== Honours ==
=== Domestic ===
- Categoría Primera B
  - Winners (1): 2002
