= Lanceros Boyacá =

Colombian football club

Lanceros
- Full name: Lanceros Boyacá
- Nickname(s): Pasión Boyacense
- Founded: 1993
- Dissolved: 2000
- Ground: Estadio La Independencia; Tunja, Colombia
- Capacity: 20,000
| Home colours | Away colours |

Lanceros Boyacá was a Colombian Categoría Primera B football team based in Tunja. The team was founded in 1993. Lanceros Boyacá is recognized for being the first professional team of the Colombia national team player Radamel Falcao.

== Notable players ==
- (Colombia) Radamel Falcao
