= División Mayor del Fútbol Profesional Colombiano =

- Abbreviation: DIMAYOR
- Formation: 1948
- Type: Sports organization
- Purpose: Football
- Location: Bogotá
- Region served: Colombia
- Members: 36 affiliated clubs
- Official language: Spanish
- President: Carlos Mario Zuluaga
- Main organ: General Assembly
- Affiliations: FIFA; CONMEBOL; FCF
- Website: dimayor.com.co

The División Mayor del Fútbol Profesional Colombiano (Major Division of Colombian Professional Football), also known by the truncation DIMAYOR, is an organization responsible for organizing and operating professional football leagues and tournaments in Colombia. It administers the top two levels of professional football leagues in Colombia, the Primera A and the Primera B, as well as the Colombian Superliga and Copa Colombia, Colombia's domestic football cup.
