= Estadio Bello Horizonte - Rey Pelé =

Football stadium in Villavicencio, Colombia

Coordinates: 04°08′21″N 73°37′9″W

- Macal
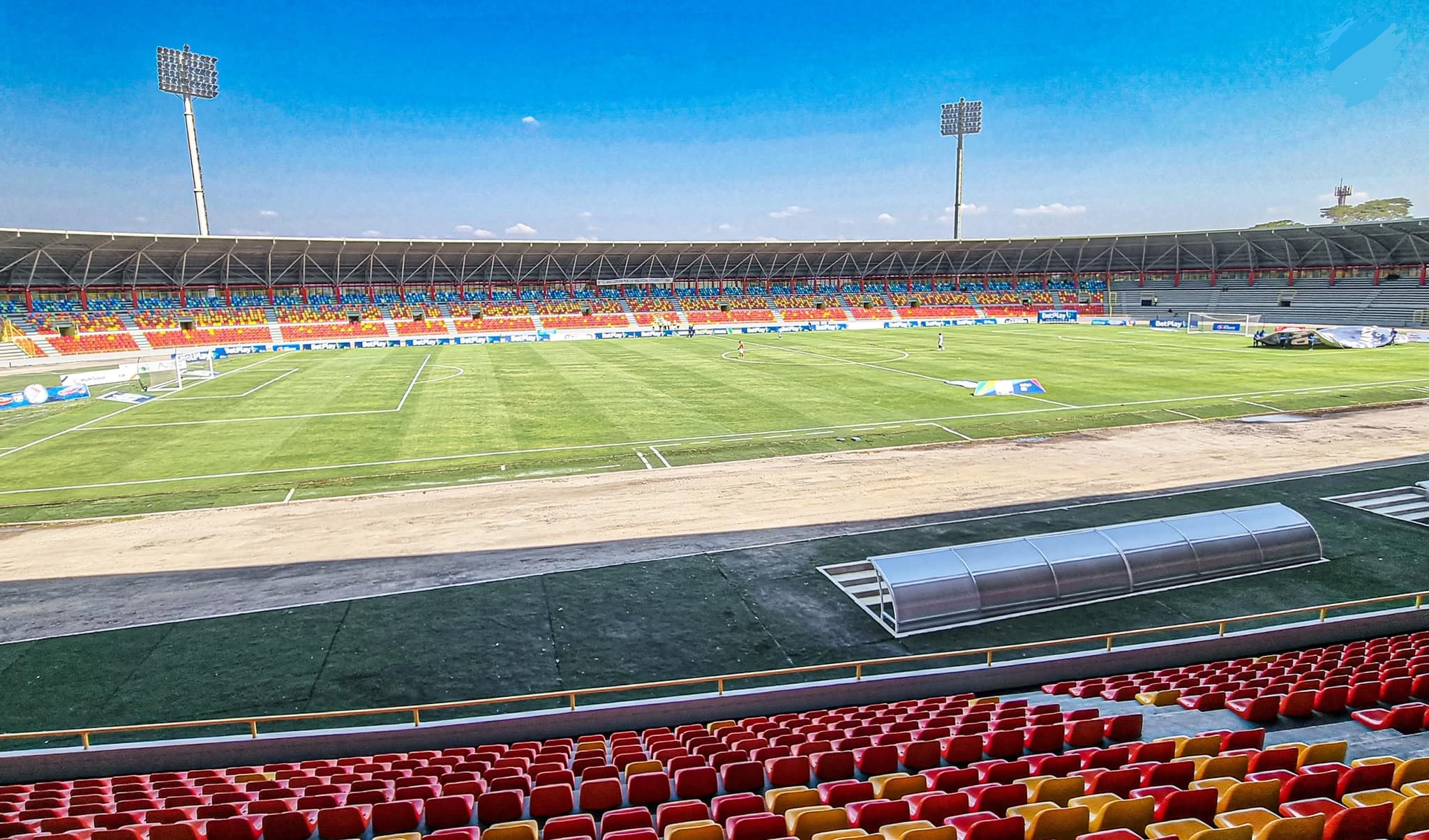
- Interactive map of Estadio Bello Horizonte - Rey Pelé
- Former names: Estadio Horizonte (1977–1987); Estadio Manuel Calle Lombana (1987–2020); Estadio Bello Horizonte (2020–2023)
- Location: Villavicencio, Colombia
- Owner: Municipality of Villavicencio
- Operator: IDERMETA; Meta Department Government
- Capacity: 15,000
- Surface: Grass
- Field size: 105x65

Construction
- Opened: 1977
- Renovated: 2001, 2003, 2012, 2019–2022

Tenants
- Alianza Llanos (1991–1997); Unión Meta (2000); Centauros (2002–2011); Llaneros (2012–)

Estadio Bello Horizonte - Rey Pelé is a football stadium located in Villavicencio, Colombia. The stadium, built in 1970, has a capacity of 15,000 people and was named after Manuel Calle Lombana, mayor of Villavicencio in 1958, thus receiving the nickname of Macal. Categoría Primera A club Llaneros play their home matches at this stadium.

== History ==
The history of the Bello Horizonte stadium dates back to 1945, when plans to enclose and build a stadium over the football field located in the Barzal neighborhood started being considered. By mid-May, Father Martín Preters and treasurer Manuel Calle Lombana, who later went on to become Mayor of Villavicencio, organized a fundraiser to carry out construction. The first stadium built at Barzal had wooden and cement stands, a half-laid football field and a fence, and although its original purpose was football, it also served as a public park. In 1959, the City Council approved the acquisition of a plot of land for a sports field and the construction of an olympic park, along with the sale of the football stadium, but Calle Lombana prevented the stadium's auction. By then, the stadium became known as "Macal".

The plot of land in which the first Macal stadium was located was eventually sold to the Instituto del Seguro Social in 1971, with the last game there being played on 12 October 1977, and the stadium was relocated to its current location, where the city's olympic park was eventually built. The new stadium, initially known as Estadio Horizonte, hosted the 1985 National Games of Colombia, and was officially renamed to Manuel Calle Lombana by a resolution by the Meta Department Assembly, issued five days after Calle Lombana's death in 1987.

The stadium has undergone several remodeling works, the first one of which being carried out in 2001 when the western grandstand was demolished and rebuilt. Two years later, due to Centauros Villavicencio's promotion to Categoría Primera A, renovation works were held in the eastern grandstand. In 2012, with the arrival of the city's new football club Llaneros, a further renovation of the stadium was carried out. Those works involved the replacement of the grass playing field for an artificial surface, the recovery and modernization of the lighting system as well as the adaptation of locker rooms and press booths. The stadium's artificial turf was in use until 2019, when it was lifted and replaced by grass. The 2019 remodeling works also included the installation of an athletic track around the field and a structural reinforcement.

In February 2020, the Governor of Meta Department Juan Guillermo Zuluaga announced the renaming of the stadium to Estadio Bello Horizonte. On 4 January 2023, Zuluaga announced a new renaming of the stadium, this time to Estadio Bello Horizonte Rey Pelé, following a suggestion by FIFA President Gianni Infantino to all countries to name one stadium in tribute to Brazilian footballer Pelé, in the aftermath of his death on 29 December 2022.
