= Deportivo Antioquia =

Colombian football club

- Full name: Deportivo Antioquia
- Founded: 1994
- Dissolved: 2006
- Ground: Estadio Metropolitano Ciudad de Itagüí; Itagüí, Colombia
- Capacity: 12,000
Home colours

Deportivo Antioquia was a Colombian football team based in Itagüí. The team was founded in 1994, after acquiring the Deportes Risaralda's club license. In its first season, Deportivo Antioquia finished second in the final standings, coming in as runner-up. In 1998, the club was renamed as Itagüí F.C.. The club would secure its second runner-up finish in 1999 by finishing second in the final quadrangulars. In 2004, the club is renamed back as Deportivo Antioquia, losing the Finals to Real Cartagena. In 2005, the club change its name to Florida Soccer and moved to Estadio Carlos Alberto Bernal in La Ceja. The club was sold and rebranded in 2006 as Córdoba F.C.
