= Girardot F.C. =

Colombian football club

- Full name: Corporación Deportiva y Social; Girardot Fútbol Club
- Nickname: Porteños
- Founded: 1995
- Dissolved: 2008 (became Deportes Palmira)
- Ground: Estadio Luis Antonio Duque Peña; Girardot, Colombia
- League: Categoría Primera B
Home colours	Away colours

Girardot F.C. was a Colombian football (soccer) team, based in Girardot, Colombia. Founded in 1995, the team competed in Categoría Primera B.

Due to financial difficulties, it was relocated to the city of Palmira at the end of the 2008 season and rebranded as Deportes Palmira.
