= Atlético Bello =

- Full name: Corporación Deportiva; Atlético Bello
- Nickname(s): Los del Norte
- Founded: 15 August 1995 (as professional club); 1 January 2015 (as amateur club)
- Dissolved: 2007
- Ground: Estadio Tulio Ospina; Bello, Colombia
- Capacity: 5,000
- Chairman: (Colombia) Gustavo Gallo
- Manager: (Colombia) Jorge Alberto Rios
- League: Categoría Primera B
- 2007: 12
Home colours	Away colours

Atlético Bello is a Colombian soccer club, from the municipality of Bello, Antioquia north of Valle de Aburrá, it was founded in 1995 as "Atlético Bello" and refounded on January 1, 2015, as "Club Deportivo Atlético Bello", currently He plays in the First C Category of the Amateur Division of Colombian Soccer. He played as a professional club in the First B Category which he played for thirteen years debuting in 1995. 1 At the end of 2007, In the Promotion Tournament in the 1997, 1998, 4 1999, and 2001 seasons. managed to qualify for the home runs but failed to qualify for the grand final. His quota was acquired by the Atlético Juventud businessmen, who replaced him until 2010.
