= Estadio Jaime Morón León =

Stadium in Colombia

Coordinates: 10.405534°N 75.498237°W

Estadio Olímpico Jaime Morón León
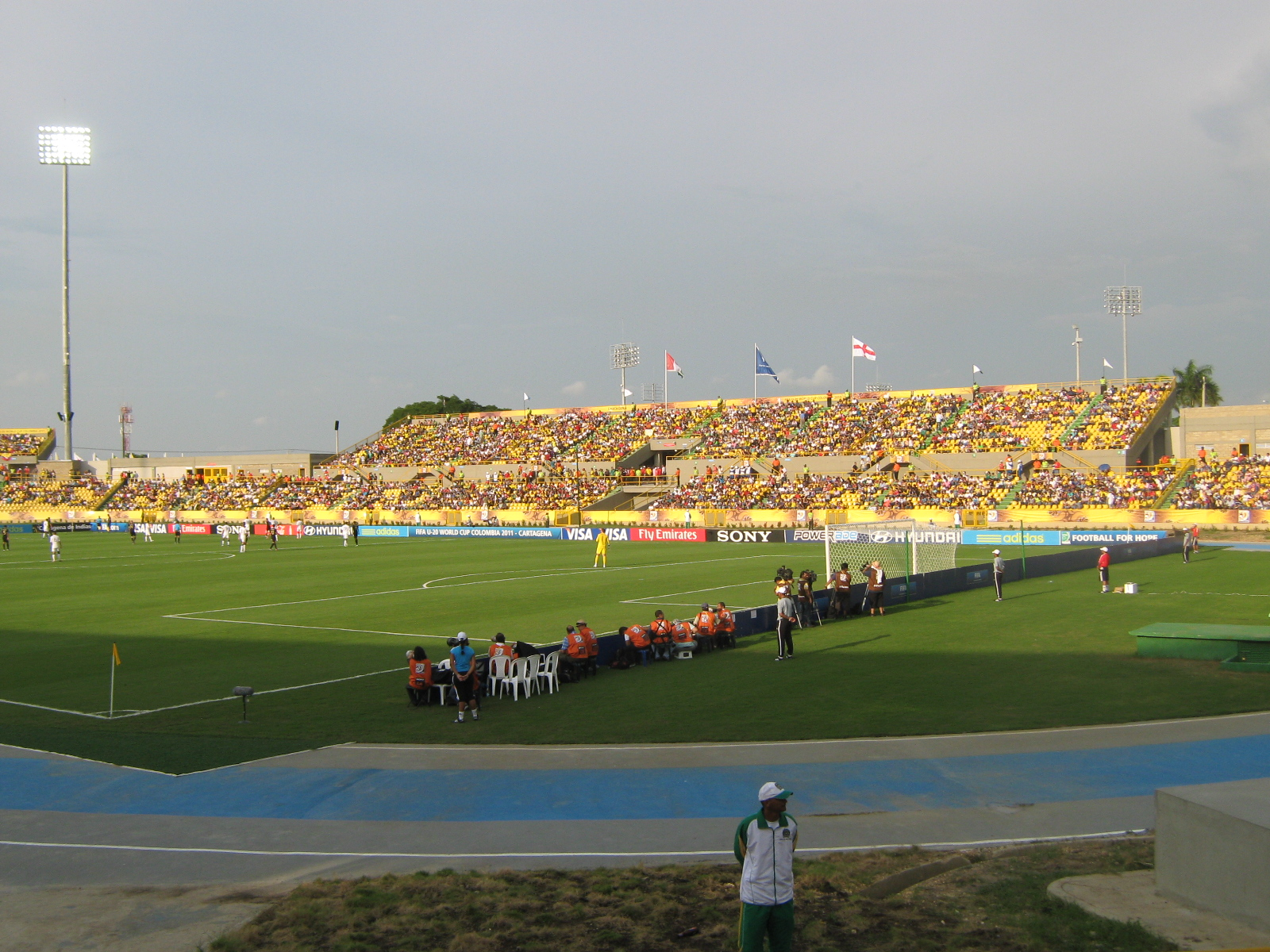
- Interactive map of Estadio Olímpico; Jaime Morón León
- Location: Cartagena, Colombia
- Capacity: 17,200
- Surface: Grass

Construction
- Opened: 1958
- Renovated: 2011

Tenant
- Real Cartagena

Estadio Jaime Morón León, formerly known as Estadio Pedro de Heredia, is a multi-use stadium in Cartagena de Indias, Colombia. Built in 1958 it has a capacity of 17,200. It is currently used mostly for football matches as the home venue of Real Cartagena.

== History ==
The stadium had a capacity of 16,068 when it hosted games of the 2011 FIFA U-20 World Cup.
