= Estadio Daniel Villa Zapata =

Multi-use stadium in Barrancabermeja, Colombia

Estadio Daniel Villa Zapata Daniel Villa Zapata Stadium
- Interactive map of Estadio Daniel Villa Zapata; Daniel Villa Zapata Stadium
- Coordinates: 7.0730528°N 73.8647139°W
- Owner: Barrancabermeja Municipality
- Capacity: 10,400
- Surface: Grass

Construction
- Opened: 1960
- Renovated: 2012–2015
- Demolished: 2012

Tenants
- Atlético Bucaramanga (1969–1970, 2006); Oro Negro (1971); Cúcuta Deportivo (1991); Alianza Petrolera (1992–2012, 2015–2023); Alianza Petrolera (women) (2017–2018); Real Santander (2021); Orsomarso (2025–)

Estadio Daniel Villa Zapata is a multi-use stadium in Barrancabermeja, Colombia. It is currently used mostly for football matches. The stadium was originally built in 1960 with a capacity of 6,000 people, which was raised to 10,400 after its most recent refurbishment. Alianza Petrolera played their home matches at this stadium.

== History ==
Since the 1940s, local authorities were concerned about building a municipal stadium that would resolve the need for a space for the practice of physical culture. However, it was during the following decade and with resources coming from the civic committees and the Pilot Plan (an agreement signed between Ecopetrol and the Barrancabermeja Municipality due to the reversal of the Mares Concession) that the project began its materialization.

The initial project, designed by engineer Guillermo González Zuleta, with an estimated budget of 7 million Colombian pesos and a duration of five years, had a football field, velodrome, track for athletics and basketball, with the possibility of building additional practice spaces for water sports due to the proximity of the Miramar Ciénaga.

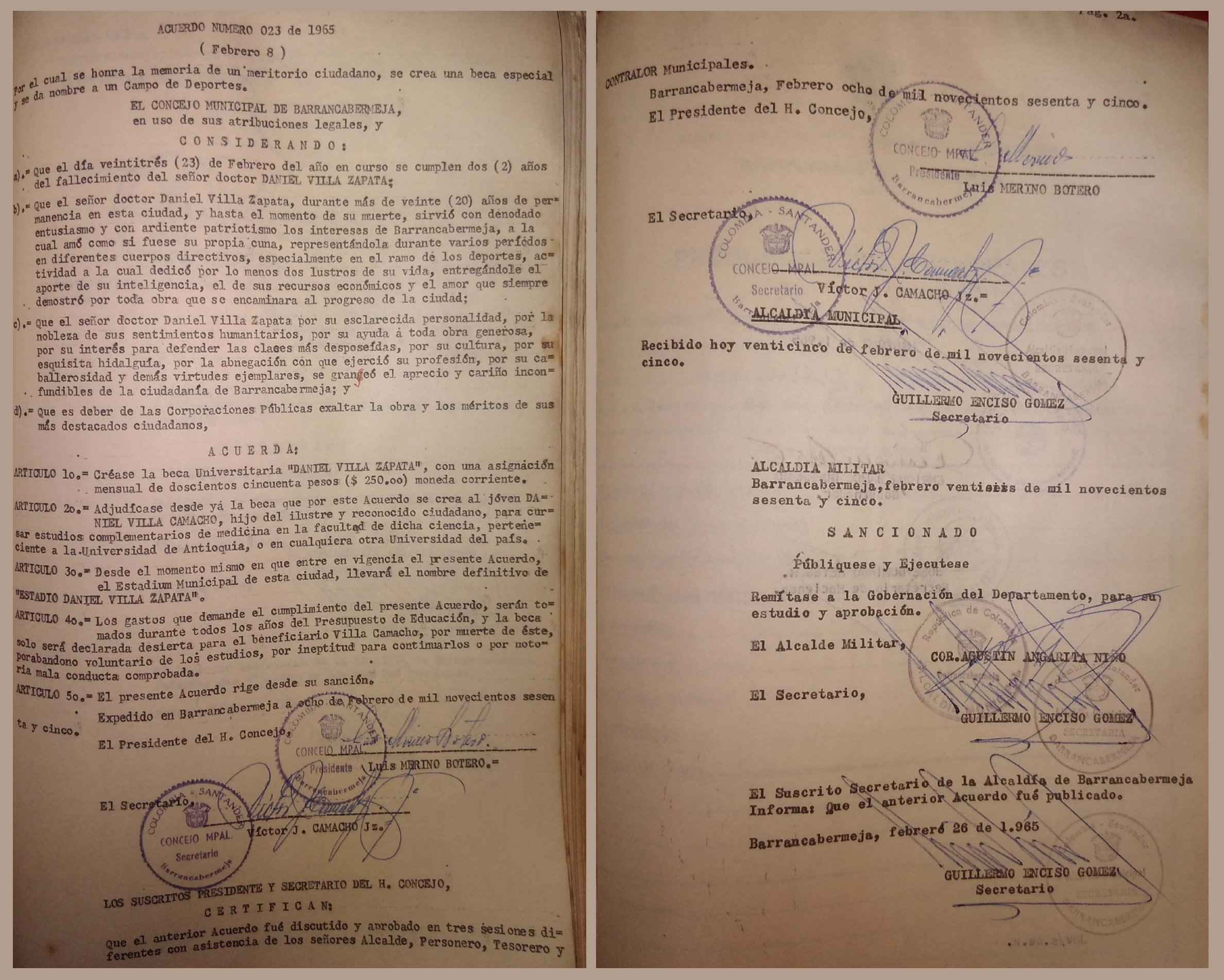
Agreement 023 of 8 February 1965, by which the name Daniel Villa Zapata was given to the Barrancabermeja football stadium.

Among the names it may have had were Estadio Alicia I, in honor of the city's first sports queen and Oro Negro stadium, term by which oil is also known. Eventually the stadium was named Daniel Villa Zapata by Municipal Agreement 023 of 8 February 1965 in honor of a dentist from Antioquia who settled in the town in the 1940s and went on to become an important local leader due to his enthusiasm for sports, especially association football. The stadium was going to be built next to the San Rafael Hospital, but the oil company Ecopetrol donated the land where it is currently located.

In 1971, the stadium hosted a professional football team for the first time, being the home base for Oro Negro who participated in that year's league tournament. Starting from 1992, it hosted Alianza Petrolera in the Categoría Primera B, Colombia's second-tier league. The first leg of the 2002 Primera B final series between Alianza Petrolera and Centauros Villavicencio was played at the stadium, ending in a scoreless draw.

Given that the stadium did not meet safety regulations, it was demolished, rebuilt and expanded to seat 10,400 people between 2012 and 2015 in order to be used by Alianza Petrolera for their matches. During these years, the club played their games at several venues in the departments of Antioquia and Santander. Alianza Petrolera was the stadium's main tenant until their final season in 2023.

Starting from 2025, Categoría Primera B club Orsomarso started using the stadium for their home matches.
