= Estadio Metropolitano Ciudad de Itagüí =

Multi-use stadium in Itagüí, Colombia

Coordinates: 4.6233°N 74.1353°W

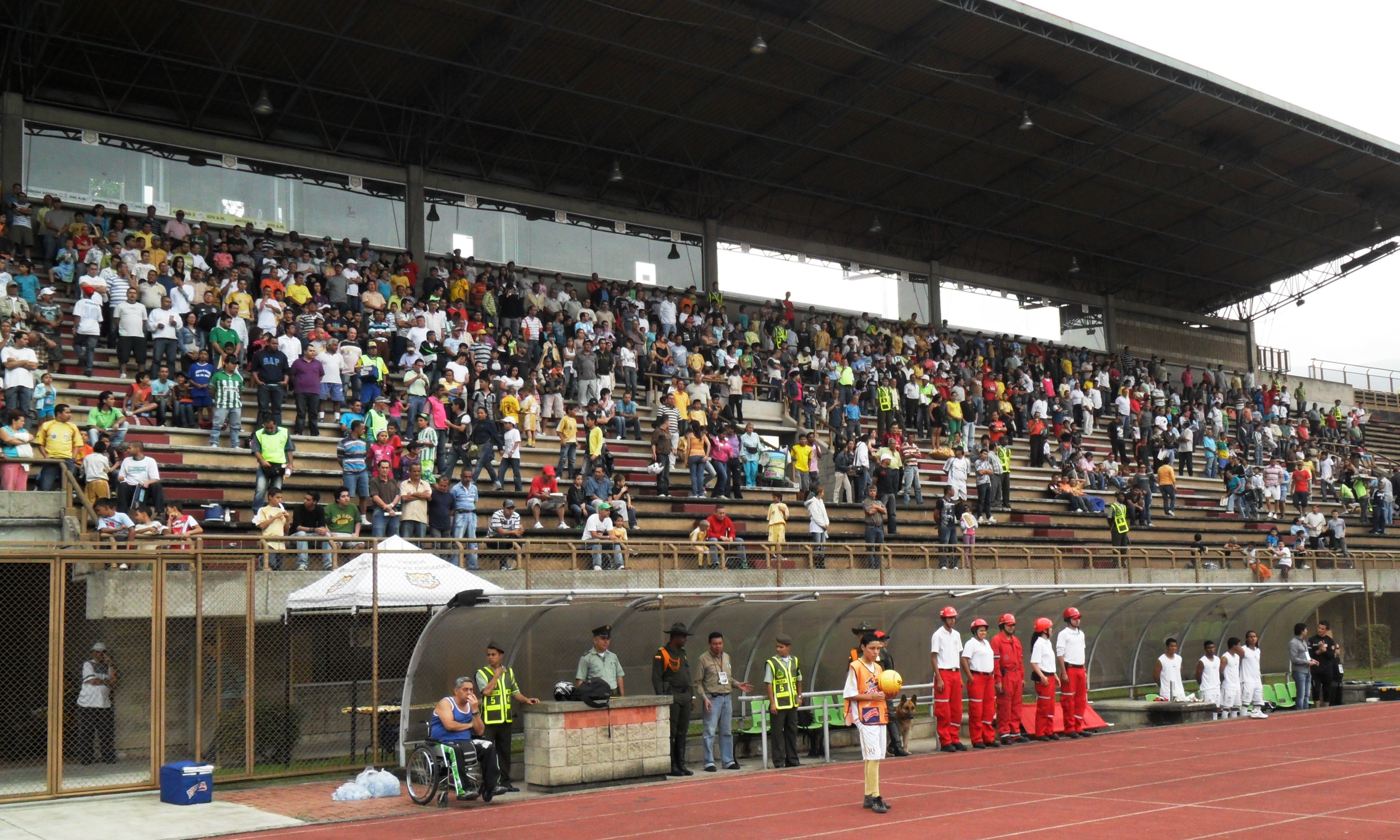
- Interactive map of Estadio Metropolitano Ciudad de Itagüí
- Full name: Estadio Metropolitano Ciudad de Itagüí
- Location: Itagüí, Colombia
- Capacity: 12,000

Construction
- Opened: 1994

Tenant
- Itagüí Leones F.C.

Estadio Metropolitano Ciudad de Itagüí is a multi-use stadium in Itagüí, Colombia. It is currently used mostly for football matches by Itagüí Leones F.C., currently playing in Categoría Primera B. The stadium has a capacity of 12,000 spectators.
