= Estadio La Independencia =

Stadium in Tunja, Colombia

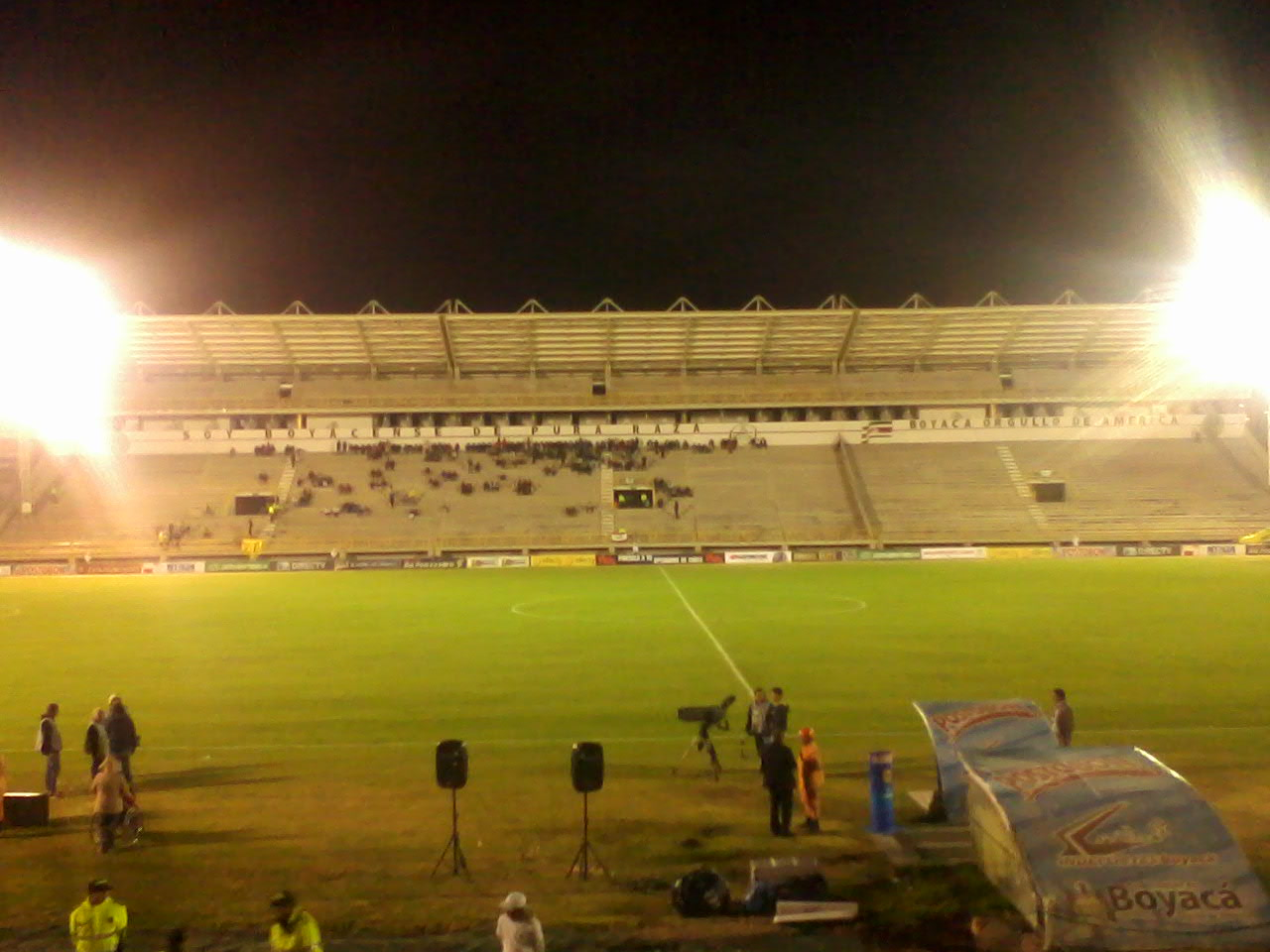
- Interactive map of Estadio La Independencia
- Full name: Estadio La Independencia
- Location: Tunja, Colombia
- Coordinates: 5°32′32.04″N 73°21′11.27″W
- Capacity: 25,000

Construction
- Opened: 1970
- Renovated: 2008
- Cost: 148,000 dollars

Tenants
- Boyacá Chicó; Patriotas

Estadio La Independencia (Spanish for The Independence Stadium) is a multi-use stadium in the city of Tunja, Colombia. It is currently used mostly for football matches. The stadium has a capacity of 25,000 people, and is 2,800 metres above sea level. Boyacá Chicó and Patriotas play their home games at this stadium.

Before Boyaca Chico's 2008 Apertura league title in July 2008, the stadium's capacity was 8,000, but for the final the capacity was temporarily expanded to 12,000. Also with Chico's qualification to 2009 Copa Libertadores, the stadium was due to be expanded, in order to achieve the minimum 20000 seats that CONMEBOL requires to host an international match. The expansion work started in December 2008, with a total cost of 26 million COP. Despite this, the renovations were completed for the first Chicó match at La Independencia, against Brazil's Gremio in the Copa Libertadores.

Since the beginning of 2017, improvements have been made due to the participation of Patriotas Boyaca. in the 2017 Copa Sudamericana. The stadium has been the main venue for musical and cultural events, including concerts of international singers such as Marc Anthony, Alejandro Fernández, among others.

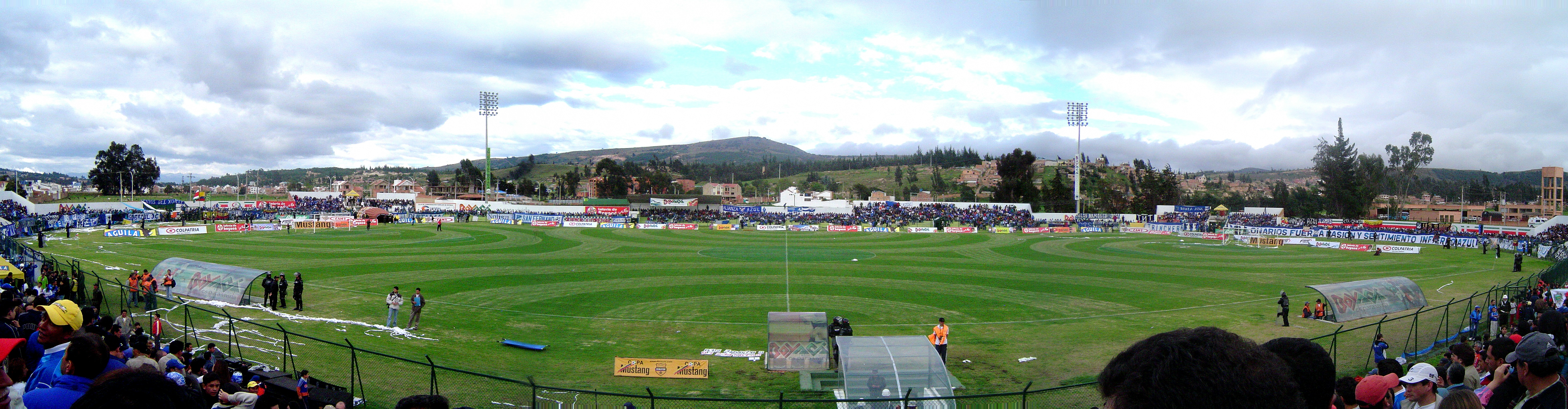
Panoramic view of Estadio La Independencia in April 2006.
