= Estadio Alberto Grisales =

Colombian football stadium

Coordinates: 6.1467°N 75.3728°W

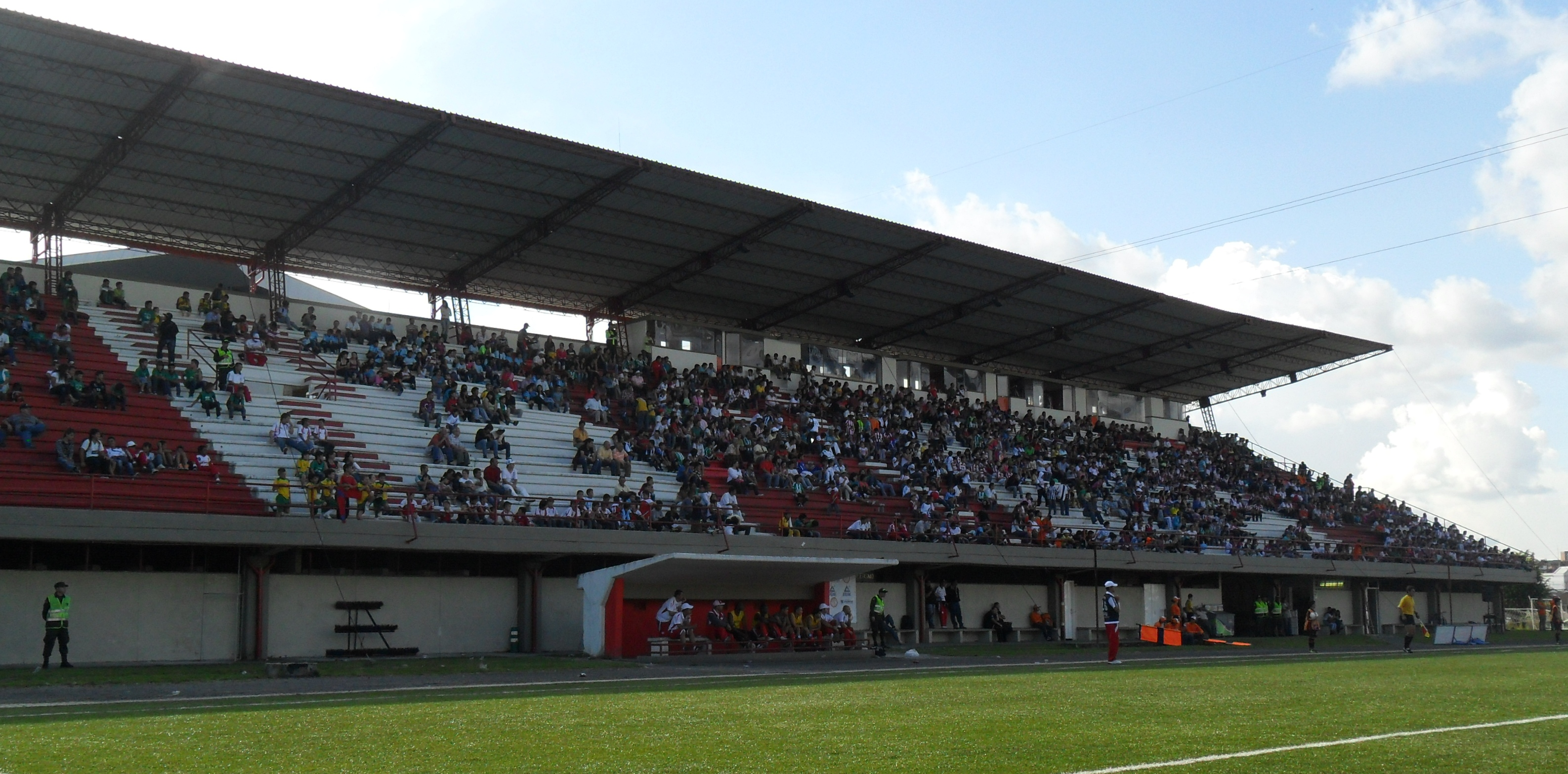
- Interactive map of Estadio Alberto Grisales
- Full name: Estadio Alberto Grisales
- Location: Rionegro, Antioquia, Colombia
- Owner: IMER Rionegro
- Operator: Águilas Doradas
- Capacity: 14,000
- Surface: Grass

Tenants
- Águilas Doradas (2015–present); Deportivo Rionegro (Formerly)

Estadio Alberto Grisales is an association football stadium in Rionegro. It is currently the home stadium of Categoría Primera A club Águilas Doradas. It has a capacity for 14,000 people.

== See also ==
- List of football stadiums in Colombia
