= 2025 Liga DIMAYOR =

Liga DIMAYOR season

Liga BetPlay Dimayor
- Season: 2025
- Dates: 24 January – 16 December 2025
- Champions: Apertura: Santa Fe (10th title); Finalización: Junior (11th title)
- Relegated: Envigado; Unión Magdalena
- Copa Libertadores: Santa Fe; Junior; Deportes Tolima; Independiente Medellín
- Copa Sudamericana: Atlético Nacional (via Copa Colombia); América de Cali; Atlético Bucaramanga; Millonarios
- Matches: 452
- Goals: 1,031 (2.28 per match)
- Top goalscorer: Apertura: Hugo Rodallega (16 goals); Finalización: Francisco Fydriszewski and Luciano Pons (12 goals each)
- Biggest home win: Alianza 6–1 Santa Fe (25 May)
- Biggest away win: Envigado 1–7 Santa Fe (28 February)
- Highest scoring: Envigado 1–7 Santa Fe (28 February)

The 2025 Liga DIMAYOR (officially known as the 2025 Liga BetPlay Dimayor season for sponsorship purposes) was the 78th season of the top-flight of the Colombian football league. The season began on 24 January and ended on 16 December 2025.

Two tournaments (Apertura and Finalización) were played in the season, each one of them being an independent championship. The Apertura tournament was won by Santa Fe, who claimed their tenth league title after defeating Independiente Medellín 2–1 on aggregate in the finals, whilst Junior were the champions in the Finalización tournament, winning their eleventh league title after defeating Deportes Tolima 4–0 on aggregate in the finals. Atlético Nacional entered the season as defending champions, having won the 2024 Finalización tournament.

== Format ==
The competition format for this season was approved by the Extraordinary Assembly of DIMAYOR held on 16 December 2024, which decided to keep the same system used in the previous seasons, with two tournaments (Apertura and Finalización) of three stages each: a first stage in which the 20 teams played each other once (with an additional match against a regional rival and reversed fixtures for the Finalización tournament), a semi-final stage (cuadrangulares) played by the top eight teams from the previous stage in which the eight teams were split into two groups of four and the top two teams from the first stage were seeded in different groups, and a double-legged final series played by the winners of both semi-final groups.

For this season, the regional derbies matchday in the first stage of each tournament was reinstated after being scrapped in 2024 due to scheduling constraints, whilst the distribution of international berths was kept: both season champions as well as the top two non-champion teams in the aggregate table qualified for the Copa Libertadores, with the next best three teams in the aggregate table as well as the Copa Colombia champions qualifying for the Copa Sudamericana.

== Teams ==
Locations of the 2025 Categoría Primera A teams
Locations of the 2025 Primera A teams in Bogotá
Locations of the 2025 Primera A teams in Medellín

Twenty teams take part in the season, the top 18 teams in the relegation table of the previous season as well as the 2024 Primera B champions Unión Magdalena, who were promoted after a one-year absence and runners-up Llaneros, who were promoted for the first time in their history. Both teams clinched promotion on 14 December 2024, following the 2024 Primera B's Grand Final. The promoted teams replaced Jaguares and Patriotas, the bottom two teams in the relegation table of the 2024 season, who were relegated to Primera B after nine and one year in the top flight, respectively.

For this season, Águilas Doradas returned to Rionegro, Antioquia to play their home matches, after the agreement with the Sincelejo Municipality expired at the end of 2024 and was not renewed.

=== Stadia and locations ===
Team	City	Stadium	Capacity
Águilas Doradas	Rionegro	Alberto Grisales	14,000
Alianza	Valledupar	Armando Maestre Pavajeau	11,000
América de Cali	Cali	Pascual Guerrero	38,588
Atlético Bucaramanga	Bucaramanga	Américo Montanini (Note: Atlético Bucaramanga hosted some home matches in the Torneo Apertura at Estadio Álvaro Gómez Hurtado in Floridablanca due to refurbishment works at their regular stadium Estadio Américo Montanini ahead of their participation in the 2025 Copa Libertadores.)	28,000
Atlético Nacional	Medellín	Atanasio Girardot	44,863
Boyacá Chicó	Tunja	La Independencia	20,630
Deportes Tolima	Ibagué	Manuel Murillo Toro	28,100
Deportivo Cali	Palmira	Deportivo Cali	42,000
Deportivo Pasto	Pasto	Departamental Libertad	18,000
Deportivo Pereira	Pereira	Hernán Ramírez Villegas (Note: Deportivo Pereira hosted some home matches in the Torneo Finalización at Estadio Centenario in Armenia due to planned refurbishment works at their regular stadium Estadio Hernán Ramírez Villegas.)	30,297
Envigado	Envigado	Polideportivo Sur	14,000
Fortaleza	Bogotá	Metropolitano de Techo	10,000
Independiente Medellín	Medellín	Atanasio Girardot	44,863
Junior	Barranquilla	Metropolitano Roberto Meléndez	46,692
La Equidad	Bogotá	Metropolitano de Techo	10,000
Llaneros	Villavicencio	Bello Horizonte – Rey Pelé	15,000
Millonarios	Bogotá	Nemesio Camacho El Campín	39,512
Once Caldas	Manizales	Palogrande	31,611
Santa Fe	Bogotá	Nemesio Camacho El Campín	39,512
Unión Magdalena	Santa Marta	Sierra Nevada	16,000

=== Personnel and kits ===
Team	Manager	Kit manufacturer	Main shirt sponsor(s)
Águilas Doradas	(Spain) Jonathan Risueño	Aerosport	
Alianza	(Colombia) Hubert Bodhert	Pin-Go	Gobernación del Cesar, Pool, Fundación Universitaria San Mateo
América de Cali	(Colombia) David González	Le Coq Sportif	Águila, BetPlay
Atlético Bucaramanga	(Colombia) Leonel Álvarez	Lotto	Rivalo, Clinisports
Atlético Nacional	(Colombia) Diego Arias	Nike	Betsson
Boyacá Chicó	(Colombia) Flabio Torres	Geus	Pool
Deportes Tolima	(Colombia) Lucas González	Umbro	BetPlay, Pool, Mercacentro
Deportivo Cali	(Colombia) Alberto Gamero	Hillside	Wplay, Pastas La Muñeca, FluoCardent
Deportivo Pasto	(Colombia) René Rosero (caretaker)	Boman	Aguardiente Nariño, Banco AV Villas
Deportivo Pereira	(Colombia) Cristian Galíndez (caretaker)	Oto	Aeropuerto Internacional Matecaña, Gobernación de Risaralda
Envigado	(Colombia) Andrés Orozco	Aleta	Pool, Colanta
Fortaleza	(Colombia) Sebastián Oliveros	Go Rigo Go	Stake
Independiente Medellín	(Colombia) Alejandro Restrepo	Adidas	Colanta, Wplay
Junior	(Uruguay) Alfredo Arias	Adidas	Olímpica, Águila, Tecnoglass
La Equidad	(Colombia) Daniel Gómez (caretaker)	Attle	Colanta, BetPlay
Llaneros	(Colombia) José Luis García	Aerosport	Maxi Cola, Aitabü Hotel Campestre, Gobernación del Meta
Millonarios	(Colombia) Hernán Torres	Adidas	Cerveza Andina
Once Caldas	(Colombia) Hernán Darío Herrera	Boman	Colanta, BetPlay, Wakate
Santa Fe	(Colombia) Francisco López (Colombia) Grigori Méndez (caretakers)	Fila	Colanta, BetPlay
Unión Magdalena	(Colombia) Carlos Silva	Aerosport	Colanta, Pool, Águila, Mega Tiendas

=== Managerial changes ===
Team	Outgoing manager	Manner of departure	Date of vacancy	Position in table	Incoming manager	Date of appointment
Torneo Apertura
Deportivo Cali	(Colombia) Sergio Herrera	Demoted to assistant manager	14 November 2024	Pre-season	(Uruguay) Alfredo Arias	20 October 2024
Águilas Doradas	(Colombia) Juan Pablo Buch	Sacked	21 November 2024	Pre-season	(Venezuela) Pedro Depablos	17 December 2024
Atlético Bucaramanga	(Venezuela) Rafael Dudamel	Resigned	27 November 2024	Pre-season	(Paraguay) Gustavo Florentín	18 December 2024
Deportivo Pasto	(Paraguay) Gustavo Florentín	Resigned	13 December 2024	Pre-season	(Colombia) Camilo Ayala	30 December 2024
Llaneros	(Venezuela) Pedro Depablos	Signed by Águilas Doradas	16 December 2024	Pre-season	(Colombia) Jaime de la Pava	16 December 2024
Millonarios	(Colombia) Alberto Gamero	Resigned	31 December 2024	Pre-season	(Colombia) David González	4 January 2025
Deportes Tolima	(Colombia) David González	Resigned	31 December 2024	Pre-season	(Spain) Ismael Rescalvo	4 January 2025
Atlético Nacional	(Mexico) Efraín Juárez	Resigned	14 January 2025	Pre-season	(Argentina) Javier Gandolfi	20 January 2025
La Equidad	(Colombia) Alexis García	Sacked	22 February 2025	18th	(Colombia) Juan Mahecha (Note: Caretaker manager.)	22 February 2025
Boyacá Chicó	(Colombia) Juan Carlos Álvarez	Sacked	23 February 2025	11th	(Paraguay) Roberto Torres	23 February 2025
Santa Fe	(Uruguay) Pablo Peirano	Mutual agreement	26 February 2025	14th	(Colombia) Francisco López (Colombia) Róbinson Zapata (Note: Caretaker managers.)	26 February 2025
La Equidad	(Colombia) Juan Mahecha	End of caretaker spell	5 March 2025	20th	(Colombia) Jhon Jairo Bodmer	5 March 2025
Llaneros	(Colombia) Jaime de la Pava	Resigned	9 March 2025	12th	(Colombia) José Luis García	9 March 2025
Unión Magdalena	(Colombia) Jorge Luis Pinto	Resigned	12 March 2025	19th	(Colombia) Alexis García (Note: Carlos Silva was the caretaker manager for the Torneo Apertura 9th round match against Boyacá Chicó.)	13 March 2025
Atlético Bucaramanga	(Paraguay) Gustavo Florentín	Sacked	14 March 2025	17th	(Colombia) Andrey Moreno	14 March 2025
Águilas Doradas	(Venezuela) Pedro Depablos	Sacked	21 March 2025	19th	(Paraguay) Gustavo Florentín (Note: Darío Sierra was the caretaker manager for the Torneo Apertura 10th round match against Envigado.)	22 March 2025
Atlético Bucaramanga	(Colombia) Andrey Moreno	End of caretaker spell	23 March 2025	14th	(Colombia) Leonel Álvarez	22 March 2025
Santa Fe	(Colombia) Francisco López (Colombia) Róbinson Zapata	End of caretaker spell	30 March 2025	2nd	(Uruguay) Jorge Bava	27 March 2025
Deportivo Pereira	(Colombia) Luis Fernando Suárez	Sacked	2 April 2025	12th	(Colombia) Jorge Enrique Patiño	3 April 2025
Deportivo Pereira	(Colombia) Jorge Enrique Patiño	End of caretaker spell	12 April 2025	12th	(Venezuela) Rafael Dudamel	9 April 2025
Boyacá Chicó	(Paraguay) Roberto Torres	Resigned	21 April 2025	17th	(Colombia) Flabio Torres	24 April 2025
Águilas Doradas	(Paraguay) Gustavo Florentín	Mutual agreement	23 April 2025	18th	(Colombia) Jhann Carlos López	23 April 2025
La Equidad	(Colombia) Jhon Jairo Bodmer	Sacked	12 May 2025	19th	(Colombia) Juan Mahecha	12 May 2025
Deportivo Cali	(Uruguay) Alfredo Arias	Mutual agreement	29 May 2025	13th	(Colombia) Alberto Gamero (Note: Sergio Herrera was the caretaker manager for the 2025 Copa Colombia.)	18 June 2025
La Equidad	(Colombia) Juan Mahecha	End of caretaker spell	3 June 2025	20th	(Spain) Diego Merino	3 June 2025
América de Cali	(Uruguay) Jorge da Silva	Resigned	19 June 2025	Group A, 2nd	(Argentina) Diego Raimondi	25 June 2025
Deportes Tolima	(Spain) Ismael Rescalvo	Resigned	19 June 2025	Group A, 3rd	(Colombia) Lucas González	22 June 2025
Junior	(Venezuela) César Farías	Mutual agreement	21 June 2025	Group A, 4th	(Uruguay) Alfredo Arias	23 June 2025
Águilas Doradas	(Colombia) Jhann Carlos López	End of caretaker spell	24 June 2025	14th	(Argentina) Pablo De Muner	24 June 2025
Torneo Finalización
Unión Magdalena	(Colombia) Alexis García	Resigned	29 July 2025	19th	(Colombia) Gerardo Bedoya	29 July 2025
Unión Magdalena	(Colombia) Gerardo Bedoya	Resigned	2 August 2025	16th	(Colombia) Carlos Silva (Note: Originally as caretaker manager, appointed on a permanent basis on 26 August 2025.)	3 August 2025
Millonarios	(Colombia) David González	Sacked	20 August 2025	20th	(Colombia) Hernán Torres (Note: Carlos Giraldo was the caretaker manager for the Torneo Finalización 8th round match against Junior.)	22 August 2025
Águilas Doradas	(Argentina) Pablo De Muner	Resigned	27 August 2025	16th	(Colombia) Jhann Carlos López	27 August 2025
América de Cali	(Argentina) Diego Raimondi	Mutual agreement	1 September 2025	19th	(Colombia) Álex Escobar	1 September 2025
Águilas Doradas	(Colombia) Jhann Carlos López	End of caretaker spell	5 September 2025	19th	(Spain) Jonathan Risueño	5 September 2025
América de Cali	(Colombia) Álex Escobar	End of caretaker spell	9 September 2025	20th	(Colombia) David González	9 September 2025
Atlético Nacional	(Argentina) Javier Gandolfi	Mutual agreement	16 September 2025	7th	(Colombia) Diego Arias (Note: Originally as caretaker manager, confirmed as permanent manager for the remainder of the season on 16 October 2025.)	16 September 2025
Santa Fe	(Uruguay) Jorge Bava	Resigned	24 September 2025	9th	(Colombia) Francisco López (Colombia) Grigori Méndez	24 September 2025
Deportivo Pasto	(Colombia) Camilo Ayala	Resigned	25 September 2025	20th	(Colombia) René Rosero	26 September 2025
La Equidad	(Spain) Diego Merino	Mutual agreement	8 October 2025	20th	(Colombia) Daniel Gómez (Note: Caretaker manager until the end of the season.)	8 October 2025
Deportivo Pereira	(Venezuela) Rafael Dudamel	Resigned	29 October 2025	16th	(Colombia) Cristian Galíndez (Note: Caretaker manager since 27 October. Germán Correa was the caretaker manager for the Torneo Finalización 17th round match against Águilas Doradas, played on 24 October.)	29 October 2025

== Torneo Apertura ==
The Torneo Apertura, officially known as Liga BetPlay Dimayor 2025–I, was the first tournament of the 2025 season. It began on 24 January and ended on 29 June 2025.

=== First stage ===
==== Standings ====
Pos	Team	Pld	W	D	L	GF	GA	GD	Pts	Qualification
1	América de Cali	20	11	6	3	29	12	+17	39	Advance to the semi-finals
2	Millonarios	20	11	5	4	30	17	+13	38	Advance to the semi-finals
3	Junior	20	10	7	3	26	16	+10	37	Advance to the semi-finals
4	Deportes Tolima	20	10	6	4	30	19	+11	36	Advance to the semi-finals
5	Atlético Nacional	20	10	5	5	37	21	+16	35	Advance to the semi-finals
6	Santa Fe	20	9	6	5	28	23	+5	33	Advance to the semi-finals
7	Once Caldas	20	10	3	7	26	22	+4	33	Advance to the semi-finals
8	Independiente Medellín	20	8	8	4	19	11	+8	32	Advance to the semi-finals
9	Atlético Bucaramanga	20	8	5	7	24	20	+4	29	
10	Alianza	20	8	5	7	23	21	+2	29	
11	Deportivo Pasto	20	8	5	7	20	20	0	29	
12	Deportivo Pereira	20	7	7	6	22	21	+1	28	
13	Deportivo Cali	20	5	9	6	14	17	−3	24	
14	Águilas Doradas	20	4	9	7	17	19	−2	21	
15	Llaneros	20	6	2	12	20	28	−8	20	
16	Fortaleza	20	5	5	10	15	25	−10	20	
17	Boyacá Chicó	20	4	8	8	14	31	−17	20	
18	Envigado	20	5	3	12	16	29	−13	18	
19	Unión Magdalena	20	1	8	11	14	30	−16	11	
20	La Equidad	20	2	4	14	13	35	−22	10	

Source: Dimayor, Soccerway
Rules for classification: 1) Points, 2) Goal difference, 3) Goals for, 4) Away goals for, 5) Away goals against, 6) Yellow cards, 7) Red cards, 8) Drawing of lots.

==== Results ====
Home \ Away	AGU	ALI	AME	BUC	NAC	BOY	TOL	CAL	PAS	PER	ENV	FOR	DIM	JUN	EQU	LLA	MIL	ONC	SFE	MAG
Águilas Doradas	—	—	0–1	0–1	2–1	—	—	—	—	3–3	1–0	—	—	—	1–1	1–2	—	0–1	0–0	1–1
Alianza	0–0	—	—	1–2	3–2	—	—	2–0	1–0	—	1–2	0–0	1–1	—	—	—	—	—	6–1	1–0
América de Cali	—	3–0	—	—	—	3–0	—	2–0	1–1	2–0	—	1–0	2–0	—	—	4–3	0–0	—	2–0	—
Atlético Bucaramanga	—	0–0	0–4	—	2–0	—	—	—	2–1	0–1	1–0	4–0	2–0	1–1	—	—	0–2	—	—	—
Atlético Nacional	—	—	1–0	—	—	4–1	4–3	—	3–0	3–0	—	—	1–1	2–3	—	2–1	—	4–0	—	1–0
Boyacá Chicó	1–1	2–1	—	1–0	—	—	1–4	—	0–0	—	1–0	0–2	—	0–2	—	2–2	—	0–0	—	—
Deportes Tolima	1–2	3–1	0–0	2–1	—	—	—	—	2–0	—	—	—	—	0–0	2–1	1–0	—	2–0	—	3–1
Deportivo Cali	0–0	—	1–1	0–0	1–0	0–0	1–1	—	—	—	1–0	—	—	—	3–1	—	3–1	—	0–2	—
Deportivo Pasto	1–0	—	—	—	—	3–0	—	1–1	—	—	—	1–0	—	3–3	2–1	1–0	0–1	2–1	—	2–1
Deportivo Pereira	—	0–0	—	—	—	1–1	0–0	2–0	1–0	—	2–0	2–0	—	1–0	3–0	—	—	1–1	—	—
Envigado	0–2	—	1–1	—	0–0	—	3–1	—	0–1	—	—	—	0–1	—	—	1–2	—	1–2	1–7	2–1
Fortaleza	2–1	—	—	—	1–5	—	1–1	1–0	—	—	0–0	—	0–0	—	4–0	1–0	0–2	—	—	0–1
Independiente Medellín	0–0	—	—	—	1–1	3–0	0–1	0–0	1–0	2–0	—	—	—	—	—	3–0	—	2–0	—	1–1
Junior	2–2	2–0	0–0	—	—	—	—	0–0	—	—	1–2	2–1	1–0	—	—	—	2–1	2–0	—	2–1
La Equidad	—	0–2	2–0	1–4	0–1	0–1	—	—	—	—	2–3	1–1	0–0	0–1	—	—	—	—	2–1	—
Llaneros	—	0–1	—	2–1	—	—	1–3	0–1	—	2–1	—	—	—	0–1	1–0	—	2–2	—	0–1	2–0
Millonarios	1–0	2–0	—	—	0–0	4–2	2–0	—	—	0–0	1–0	—	0–1	—	2–1	—	—	—	2–0	—
Once Caldas	—	1–2	3–0	2–1	—	—	—	1–0	—	3–1	—	2–1	—	—	3–0	1–0	2–2	—	0–1	—
Santa Fe	—	—	—	1–1	2–2	0–0	0–0	—	1–1	2–1	—	2–0	1–2	2–1	—	—	3–2	—	—	—
Unión Magdalena	—	—	0–2	1–1	—	1–1	—	2–2	—	2–2	—	—	—	0–0	0–0	—	1–3	0–3 (Note: Match abandoned after 80 minutes of play and awarded 0–3 to Once Caldas due to pitch invasion by Unión Magdalena fans. The score at the time of suspension was 0–1.)	0–1	—

Source: Dimayor, Soccerway
Legend: Blue = home team win; Yellow = draw; Red = away team win.

=== Semi-finals ===
The eight teams that advanced to the semi-finals were drawn into two groups of four teams, with the top two teams from the first stage being seeded in each group. The two group winners advanced to the finals.

==== Group A ====
Pos	Team	Pld	W	D	L	GF	GA	GD	Pts	Qualification	DIM	AME	TOL	JUN
1	Independiente Medellín	6	4	2	0	9	4	+5	14	Advance to the Finals	—	1–1	2–1	1–0
2	América de Cali	6	2	3	1	7	7	0	9		1–1	—	1–3	2–1
3	Deportes Tolima	6	2	2	2	9	8	+1	8		1–3	1–1	—	2–0
4	Junior	6	0	1	5	2	8	−6	1		0–1	0–1	1–1	—

Source: Dimayor, Soccerway
Legend: Blue = home team win; Yellow = draw; Red = away team win.
Rules for classification: 1) Points, 2) First stage position (only applies for the seeded team, if it is involved in a tie), 3) Goal difference, 4) Goals for, 5) Away goals for, 6) Away goals against, 7) First stage position.

==== Group B ====
Pos	Team	Pld	W	D	L	GF	GA	GD	Pts	Qualification	SFE	MIL	NAC	ONC
1	Santa Fe	6	4	0	2	8	6	+2	12	Advance to the Finals	—	0–1	1–2	1–0
2	Millonarios	6	2	3	1	5	4	+1	9		1–2	—	0–0	2–2
3	Atlético Nacional	6	2	2	2	5	5	0	8		1–2	0–1	—	0–0
4	Once Caldas	6	0	3	3	4	7	−3	3		1–2	0–0	1–2	—

Source: Dimayor, Soccerway
Legend: Blue = home team win; Yellow = draw; Red = away team win.
Rules for classification: 1) Points, 2) First stage position (only applies for the seeded team, if it is involved in a tie), 3) Goal difference, 4) Goals for, 5) Away goals for, 6) Away goals against, 7) First stage position.

=== Finals ===
24 June 2025
19:30 UTC−5

Santa Fe	0–0	Independiente Medellín
	Report

Estadio El Campín, Bogotá
Attendance: 35,072
Referee: Diego Ulloa

29 June 2025
18:00 UTC−5

Independiente Medellín	1–2	Santa Fe
Fydriszewski 18'	Report	S. Mosquera 31'; Rodallega 79'

Estadio Atanasio Girardot, Medellín
Attendance: 44,629
Referee: Bismarks Santiago

Santa Fe won 2–1 on aggregate.

=== Top scorers ===
Rank	Player	Club	Goals
1	(Colombia) Hugo Rodallega	Santa Fe	16
2	(Colombia) Dayro Moreno	Once Caldas	11
3	(Argentina) Gonzalo Lencina	Deportes Tolima	10
4	(Colombia) Edwin Cardona	Atlético Nacional	9
5	(Colombia) Alfredo Morelos	Atlético Nacional	8
6	(Malaysia) Rodrigo Holgado	América de Cali	7
6	(Colombia) Jairo Molina	Boyacá Chicó	7
6	(Colombia) Duván Vergara	América de Cali	7
9	(Colombia) Emilio Aristizábal	Fortaleza	6
9	(Colombia) Leonardo Castro	Millonarios	6
9	(Colombia) Radamel Falcao	Millonarios	6
9	(Argentina) Luciano Pons	Atlético Bucaramanga	6
9	(Colombia) Kevin Viveros	Atlético Nacional	6

Source: Soccerway

== Torneo Finalización ==
The Torneo Finalización, officially known as Liga BetPlay Dimayor 2025–II, was the second and last tournament of the 2025 season. It began on 11 July and ended on 16 December 2025.

=== First stage ===
==== Standings ====
Pos	Team	Pld	W	D	L	GF	GA	GD	Pts	Qualification
1	Independiente Medellín	20	12	4	4	46	28	+18	40	Advance to the semi-finals
2	Deportes Tolima	20	12	2	6	29	17	+12	38	Advance to the semi-finals
3	Atlético Nacional	20	10	7	3	38	24	+14	37	Advance to the semi-finals
4	Atlético Bucaramanga	20	11	4	5	31	20	+11	37	Advance to the semi-finals
5	Junior	20	10	5	5	35	25	+10	35	Advance to the semi-finals
6	Fortaleza	20	9	8	3	25	19	+6	35	Advance to the semi-finals
7	Santa Fe	20	8	7	5	21	17	+4	31	Advance to the semi-finals
8	América de Cali	20	8	5	7	23	19	+4	29	Advance to the semi-finals
9	Alianza	20	8	5	7	24	22	+2	29	
10	Águilas Doradas	20	7	6	7	29	27	+2	27	
11	Once Caldas	20	7	6	7	21	24	−3	27	
12	Millonarios	20	7	5	8	23	26	−3	26	
13	Llaneros	20	7	4	9	17	25	−8	25	
14	Deportivo Cali	20	5	6	9	22	28	−6	21	
15	Unión Magdalena	20	6	3	11	22	32	−10	21	
16	Envigado	20	4	8	8	18	22	−4	20	
17	Deportivo Pasto	20	4	7	9	26	28	−2	19	
18	Deportivo Pereira	20	4	6	10	19	36	−17	18	
19	Boyacá Chicó	20	3	7	10	14	29	−15	16	
20	La Equidad	20	3	5	12	14	29	−15	14	

Source: Dimayor, Soccerway
Rules for classification: 1) Points, 2) Goal difference, 3) Goals for, 4) Away goals for, 5) Away goals against, 6) Yellow cards, 7) Red cards, 8) Drawing of lots.

==== Results ====
Home \ Away	AGU	ALI	AME	BUC	NAC	BOY	TOL	CAL	PAS	PER	ENV	FOR	DIM	JUN	EQU	LLA	MIL	ONC	SFE	MAG
Águilas Doradas	—	1–0	—	—	—	2–0	1–2	3–1	2–2	—	1–0	2–2	2–1	2–3	—	—	1–2	—	—	—
Alianza	—	—	1–0	1–3	—	2–0	0–1	—	—	1–0	—	—	—	0–1	2–0	3–1	3–0	0–0	—	—
América de Cali	2–1	—	—	0–0	1–1	—	0–1	0–0	—	—	1–1	—	—	2–1	3–2	—	—	2–1	—	3–0
Atlético Bucaramanga	4–0	3–1	—	—	—	1–1	2–0	2–3	—	—	—	—	—	—	2–1	2–0	—	0–0	2–1	1–0
Atlético Nacional	2–1	3–0	—	0–3 (Note: Match awarded 0–3 to Atlético Bucaramanga after Atlético Nacional breached tournament rules by fielding four foreign players simultaneously. The match originally ended with Atlético Bucaramanga winning 0–1.)	—	—	—	2–1	—	—	1–0	2–2	5–2	—	3–1	—	2–0	—	1–1	—
Boyacá Chicó	—	—	0–2	—	1–1	—	—	0–0	2–2	1–1	—	—	2–0	—	0–0	—	1–2	—	0–0	1–0
Deportes Tolima	—	—	—	—	0–0	4–0	—	2–1	—	1–0	1–2	1–1	2–3	—	—	3–1	3–1	—	0–1	—
Deportivo Cali	—	0–1	0–2	—	—	—	—	—	2–1	1–0	—	1–1	1–3	0–2	—	0–3	—	1–1	—	3–1
Deportivo Pasto	—	3–3	0–2	3–0	2–2	2–0	3–2	—	—	4–0	0–1	—	1–2	—	—	—	—	—	1–1	—
Deportivo Pereira	1–5	—	2–1	0–1	2–1	—	—	—	—	—	—	—	1–4	—	—	0–0	3–2	2–1	2–2	2–2
Envigado	1–1	0–0	—	1–2	—	0–2	—	0–0	—	1–1	—	0–1	—	1–1	1–1	—	1–1	—	—	—
Fortaleza	—	2–2	1–0	2–1	—	1–0	—	—	2–0	0–0	—	—	—	1–1	1–0	—	—	2–1	2–0	—
Independiente Medellín	—	1–1	3–0	3–0	3–3	—	—	—	—	—	3–4	3–1	—	2–2	3–1	—	1–0	—	1–1	—
Junior	—	—	—	2–1	2–1	2–0	0–1	—	2–0	3–2	—	—	—	—	1–1	4–0	—	—	1–2	4–1
La Equidad	0–0	—	—	—	—	—	0–2	0–4	0–0	4–0	—	0–1	—	—	—	2–1	1–0	0–1	—	0–1
Llaneros	0–1	—	0–0	—	0–3	2–1	1–0	—	2–1	—	0–3	0–0	0–1	—	—	—	—	2–0	—	—
Millonarios	—	—	2–1	1–1	—	—	—	3–3	1–0	—	—	3–2	—	3–0	—	0–1	—	0–0	0–0	1–2
Once Caldas	1–1	—	—	—	1–3	5–2	0–1	—	1–0	1–0	1–0	—	1–5	2–2	—	—	—	—	—	1–0
Santa Fe	0–0	1–0	2–1	—	—	—	—	1–0	—	—	1–0	—	—	—	3–0	1–3	0–1	1–2	—	2–0
Unión Magdalena	3–2	2–3	—	—	1–2	—	0–2	—	1–1	—	3–1	2–0	0–2	3–1	—	0–0	—	—	—	—

Source: Dimayor, Soccerway
Legend: Blue = home team win; Yellow = draw; Red = away team win.

=== Semi-finals ===
The eight teams that advanced to the semi-finals were drawn into two groups of four teams, with the top two teams from the first stage being seeded in each group. The two group winners advanced to the finals.

==== Group A ====
Pos	Team	Pld	W	D	L	GF	GA	GD	Pts	Qualification	JUN	AME	NAC	DIM
1	Junior	6	3	2	1	8	6	+2	11	Advance to the Finals	—	2–1	2–1	1–0
2	América de Cali	6	2	2	2	8	8	0	8		1–1	—	3–2	2–1
3	Atlético Nacional	6	2	2	2	7	7	0	8		1–1	1–0	—	2–1
4	Independiente Medellín	6	1	2	3	5	7	−2	5		2–1	1–1	0–0	—

Source: Dimayor, Soccerway
Legend: Blue = home team win; Yellow = draw; Red = away team win.
Rules for classification: 1) Points, 2) First stage position (only applies for the seeded team, if it is involved in a tie), 3) Goal difference, 4) Goals for, 5) Away goals for, 6) Away goals against, 7) First stage position.

==== Group B ====
Pos	Team	Pld	W	D	L	GF	GA	GD	Pts	Qualification	TOL	BUC	SFE	FOR
1	Deportes Tolima	6	4	2	0	5	1	+4	14	Advance to the Finals	—	0–0	1–0	1–0
2	Atlético Bucaramanga	6	2	3	1	4	2	+2	9		0–0	—	1–0	1–2
3	Santa Fe	6	2	1	3	6	5	+1	7		1–2	0–0	—	3–0
4	Fortaleza	6	1	0	5	3	10	−7	3		0–1	0–2	1–2	—

Source: Dimayor, Soccerway
Legend: Blue = home team win; Yellow = draw; Red = away team win.
Rules for classification: 1) Points, 2) First stage position (only applies for the seeded team, if it is involved in a tie), 3) Goal difference, 4) Goals for, 5) Away goals for, 6) Away goals against, 7) First stage position.

=== Finals ===
12 December 2025
20:00 UTC−5

Junior	3–0	Deportes Tolima
Enamorado 5', 39'; Castrillón 36'	Report

Estadio Metropolitano Roberto Meléndez, Barranquilla
Referee: Carlos Betancur

16 December 2025
19:30 UTC−5

Deportes Tolima	0–1	Junior
	Report	Enamorado 16'

Estadio Manuel Murillo Toro, Ibagué
Referee: Andrés Rojas

Junior won 4–0 on aggregate.

=== Top scorers ===
Rank	Player	Club	Goals
1	(Argentina) Francisco Fydriszewski	Independiente Medellín	12
1	(Argentina) Luciano Pons	Atlético Bucaramanga	12
3	(Colombia) Carlos Lucumí	Alianza	10
3	(Colombia) Brayan León	Independiente Medellín	10
3	(Colombia) Yoshan Valois	Deportivo Pasto	10
6	(Colombia) Alfredo Morelos	Atlético Nacional	8
6	(Colombia) José Enamorado	Junior	8
8	(Colombia) Hugo Rodallega	Santa Fe	7
8	(Colombia) Jefry Zapata	Once Caldas	7
8	(Colombia) Jairo Molina	Boyacá Chicó	7
8	(Colombia) Ricardo Márquez	Unión Magdalena	7
8	(Colombia) Beckham Castro	Millonarios	7
8	(Colombia) Jannenson Sarmiento	Unión Magdalena	7
8	(Colombia) Stiven Rodríguez	Junior	7

Source: Besoccer

== Aggregate table ==
Pos	Team	Pld	W	D	L	GF	GA	GD	Pts	Qualification
1	Deportes Tolima	54	28	12	14	73	49	+24	96	Qualification for Copa Libertadores second stage
2	Independiente Medellín	54	25	17	12	80	52	+28	92	Qualification for Copa Libertadores second stage
3	Junior (C)	54	25	15	14	75	55	+20	90	Qualification for Copa Libertadores group stage
4	Atlético Nacional	52	24	16	12	87	57	+30	88	Qualification for Copa Sudamericana first stage (Note: Atlético Nacional qualified for the Copa Sudamericana first stage by winning the 2025 Copa Colombia.)
5	Santa Fe (C)	54	24	15	15	65	52	+13	87	Qualification for Copa Libertadores group stage
6	América de Cali	52	23	16	13	67	46	+21	85	Qualification for Copa Sudamericana first stage
7	Atlético Bucaramanga	46	21	12	13	59	42	+17	75	Qualification for Copa Sudamericana first stage
8	Millonarios	46	20	13	13	58	47	+11	73	Qualification for Copa Sudamericana first stage
9	Once Caldas	46	17	12	17	51	53	−2	63	
10	Alianza	40	16	10	14	47	43	+4	58	
11	Fortaleza	46	15	13	18	43	54	−11	58	
12	Águilas Doradas	40	11	15	14	46	46	0	48	
13	Deportivo Pasto	40	12	12	16	46	48	−2	48	
14	Deportivo Pereira	40	11	13	16	41	57	−16	46	
15	Deportivo Cali	40	10	15	15	36	45	−9	45	
16	Llaneros	40	13	6	21	37	53	−16	45	
17	Envigado	40	9	11	20	34	51	−17	38	
18	Boyacá Chicó	40	7	15	18	28	60	−32	36	
19	Unión Magdalena	40	7	11	22	36	62	−26	32	
20	La Equidad	40	5	9	26	27	64	−37	24	

Source: Dimayor
Rules for classification: 1) Points, 2) Goal difference, 3) Goals for, 4) Away goals for, 5) Away goals against, 6) Drawing of lots.
(C) Champions

== Relegation ==
A separate table was kept to determine the teams that were relegated to the Categoría Primera B for the next season. This table was elaborated from a sum of all first stage games played in the three most recent seasons (including the 2023–I, 2023–II, 2024–I, 2024–II, 2025–I, and 2025–II tournaments), with the points earned being averaged per match played. The bottom two teams of the relegation table at the end of the season were relegated to Categoría Primera B.

Pos	Team	2023 Pts	2024 Pts	2025 Pts	2025 GF	2025 GA	2025 GD	Total Pld	Total Pts	Avg.	Relegation
1	Deportes Tolima	61	72	74	59	36	+23	118	207	1.754	
2	América de Cali	69	62	68	52	31	+21	118	199	1.686	
3	Independiente Medellín	68	58	72	65	39	+26	118	198	1.678	
4	Atlético Nacional	68	56	72	75	45	+30	118	196	1.661	
5	Millonarios	68	66	64	53	43	+10	118	198	1.678	
6	Junior	58	60	72	61	41	+20	118	190	1.610	
7	Santa Fe	50	71	64	49	40	+9	118	185	1.568	
8	Atlético Bucaramanga	46	66	66	55	40	+15	118	178	1.508	
9	Águilas Doradas	83	46	48	46	46	0	118	177	1.500	
10	Once Caldas	42	60	60	47	46	+1	118	162	1.373	
11	Fortaleza	—	51	55	40	44	−4	78	106	1.359	
12	Deportivo Pasto	54	49	48	46	48	−2	118	151	1.280	
13	Deportivo Pereira	44	61	46	41	57	−16	118	151	1.280	
14	Alianza	58	33	58	47	43	+4	118	149	1.263	
15	Deportivo Cali	51	38	45	36	45	−9	118	134	1.136	
16	Llaneros	—	—	45	37	53	−16	40	45	1.125	
17	La Equidad	52	55	24	27	64	−37	118	131	1.110	
18	Boyacá Chicó	49	33	36	28	60	−32	118	118	1.000	
19	Envigado (R)	33	29	38	34	51	−17	118	100	0.847	Relegation to Categoría Primera B
20	Unión Magdalena (R)	—	—	32	36	62	−26	40	32	0.800	Relegation to Categoría Primera B

Source: Dimayor
Rules for classification: 1) average, 2) 2025 points, 3) 2025 goal difference, 4) 2025 goals scored, 5) 2025 away goals scored, 6) 2025 away goals against, 7) 2025 wins, 8) 2025 yellow cards, 9) 2025 red cards, 10) drawing of lots.

== Attendances ==
The average league attendance was 11,950 in the 2025–I season:

#	Club	Average
1	Atlético Nacional	34,231
2	Independiente Medellín	28,745
3	Millonarios	26,634
4	Deportivo Cali	20,850
5	Santa Fe	16,240
6	Once Caldas	14,896
7	Deportivo Pereira	12,500
8	Junior	11,707
9	Atlético Bucaramanga	11,300
10	Deportes Tolima	10,900
11	América de Cali	9,457
12	La Equidad	6,220
13	Deportivo Pasto	6,200
14	Unión Magdalena	6,100
15	Fortaleza	5,869
16	Llaneros	5,760
17	Envigado	4,200
18	Alianza	3,900
19	Águilas Doradas	2,400
20	Boyacá Chicó	900

== See also ==
- 2025 Categoría Primera B season
- 2025 Copa Colombia
