= René Rosero =

Colombian footballer and manager (born 1984)

Personal information
- Full name: Jonathan René Rosero Tovar
- Date of birth: 5 September 1984 (age 42)
- Place of birth: Barbacoas, Colombia
- Height: 1.73 m (5 ft 8 in)
- Position: Midfielder

Youth career
- 2003: Deportivo Pasto

Senior career*
| Years | Team | Apps | (Gls) |
| 2004–2015 | Deportivo Pasto | 275 | (3) |

Managerial career
- 2018–2019: Deportivo Pasto (women)
- 2019–2026: Deportivo Pasto (assistant)
- 2024: Deportivo Pasto (interim)
- 2025: Deportivo Pasto (interim)
- 2026: Deportivo Pasto (women)
- 2026–: Deportivo Pasto
- * Club domestic league appearances and goals

Jonathan René Rosero Tovar (born 5 September 1984) is a Colombian football manager and former player who played as a midfielder. He most recently managed Deportivo Pasto.

== Playing career ==
Born in Barbacoas, Nariño, Rosero joined Deportivo Pasto's youth sides in 2003 after impressing with an amateur side in his hometown. After being promoted to the main squad for the 2004 season, he made his professional debut on 22 February of that year, starting in a 2–1 home win over Deportes Quindío.

Rosero scored his first professional goal on 9 June 2004, netting the opener in a 4–0 home routing of América de Cali. He continued to feature regularly with the club in the following years, becoming team captain in the 2013 season.

In November 2013, after undergoing surgery due to a knee injury, Rosero was admitted to the ICU due to a viral encephalitis. He spent the entire 2014 season recovering, only returning in 2015 but leaving in May of that year; he retired shortly after.

== Managerial career ==
After retiring, Rosero worked at his only club Deportivo Pasto as manager of the women's team, before becoming an assistant of the main squad in September 2019. On 25 February 2024, he was appointed interim manager of the first team, replacing sacked Jersson González. Following the appointment of Gustavo Florentín as Deportivo Pasto manager on 8 April, he returned to the role of assistant manager.

On 26 September 2025, Rosero was once again appointed as interim manager of Deportivo Pasto's first team, following the resignation of Camilo Ayala, and returned to his assistant role at the end of the season due to the arrival of Jonathan Risueño.

On 2 April 2026, Rosero took over as manager of Deportivo Pasto's women's team, replacing Javier Valencia, but on 24 August he was recalled as interim manager of the men's first team following the departure of Jonathan Risueño. Although he was confirmed as incumbent manager for the remainder of the season by Deportivo Pasto five days later, on 9 October the club announced Rosero's departure from the role.
