= Mahecha =

Mahecha is a Basque surname. Notable people with the surname include:

- Carlos Mahecha (born 1992), Colombian swimmer
- Juan Mahecha (born 1987), Colombian footballer
- Lizeth Mahecha (born 1971), Colombian actress
