= Dani Plomer =

Spanish footballer

Personal information
- Full name: Daniel Enrique Plomer Gordillo
- Date of birth: 30 November 1998 (age 27)
- Place of birth: Palma, Spain
- Height: 1.79 m (5 ft 10 1/2 in)
- Position: Winger

Team information
- Current team: Rayo Majadahonda
- Number: 10

Youth career
- Cide
- Mallorca
- Penya Arrabal
- San Francisco
- Mallorca

Senior career*
Years	Team	Apps	(Gls)
2017	Independiente Camp Redó	13	(2)
2018	Santa Catalina	11	(4)
2018–2019	Poblense	39	(15)
2019–2020	Leganés B	26	(7)
2020	Leganés	0	(0)
2020–2022	Granada B	36	(2)
2020–2022	Granada	1	(0)
2022	El Ejido	15	(1)
2022–2023	Poblense	17	(6)
2023–2024	Gimnástica Segoviana	38	(9)
2024–2025	Atlético Baleares	25	(3)
2025–	Rayo Majadahonda	30	(4)
- * Club domestic league appearances and goals as of 16 May 2026

Daniel Enrique "Dani" Plomer Gordillo (born 30 November 1998) is a Spanish professional footballer who plays for Segunda Federación club Rayo Majadahonda as a left winger.

== Club career ==
Born in Palma, Mallorca, Balearic Islands, Plomer represented Centro Internacional de Educación (CIDE), RCD Mallorca, AD Penya Arrabal and CD San Francisco as a youth. In 2017, after finishing his formation, he made his senior debut with SCD Independiente before moving to Tercera División side Club Santa Catalina Atlético in December.

On 5 July 2018, Plomer signed for UD Poblense, still in the fourth division. On 13 August of the following year, after scoring 15 goals, he joined CD Leganés and was assigned to the reserves also in division four.

Plomer made his professional debut on 30 January 2020, coming on as a second-half substitute for Martin Braithwaite in a 0–5 away loss against FC Barcelona, for the season's Copa del Rey. On 19 August, he agreed to a two-year contract with Granada CF and was assigned to the B-team in Segunda División B.

Plomer made his first team – and La Liga – debut for the Andalusians on 8 November 2020, replacing Roberto Soldado in a 0–2 away loss against Real Sociedad, as his side was heavily impacted by the COVID-19 pandemic.

On 21 June 2024, Plomer signed with Atlético Baleares in the fourth-tier Segunda Federación.
