= Luis Lora =

Colombian footballer (born 1986)

Personal information
- Full name: Luis Eduardo Lora
- Date of birth: 13 March 1986 (age 40)
- Place of birth: Colombia
- Position: Defender

Youth career
- Deportivo Pasto

Senior career*
Years	Team	Apps	(Gls)
2004–2014	Deportivo Pasto	104	(3)
- * Club domestic league appearances and goals as of 21:50, 23 March 2015 (UTC)

Luis Eduardo Lora is a retired Colombian football player who played only for Deportivo Pasto in Colombia.

== Honours ==
Deportivo Pasto

- Categoría Primera A (1): 2006-I
- Categoría Primera B (1): 2011
