= Alianza Valledupar F.C. =

Association football club in Colombia

Alianza Valledupar
- Full name: Alianza Fútbol Club
- Nickname: Los Vallenatos (The Valledupar ones)
- Founded: 16 January 2024; 2 years ago
- Ground: Armando Maestre Pavajeau
- Capacity: 11,000
- President: Carlos Ferreira
- Head coach: Flabio Torres
- 2025: Primera A, 10th of 20
- Website: alianzafc.com.co
Home colours	Away colours	Third colours

Alianza Fútbol Club is a Colombian professional football team based in Valledupar, Cesar Department, that currently plays in the Categoría Primera A. The club was founded on 16 January 2024 and plays its home games at the Armando Maestre Pavajeau stadium.

== History ==
Alianza F.C. was founded by the owner and chairman of Alianza Petrolera, Carlos Orlando Ferreira, who relocated the club from Barrancabermeja, Santander Department after being offered financial support by the newly elected authorities and private enterprises from Valledupar and the Cesar Department.

Whilst Alianza Petrolera came from an eighth-place finish in the aggregate table of the 2023 Categoría Primera A season that qualified them for their first international competition, the 2024 Copa Sudamericana, by early January 2024 issues regarding financial support as well as the fact that Estadio Daniel Villa Zapata in Barrancabermeja was not suitable to host international games came up, along with an interest from Valledupar for the club to play their home matches there. On 16 January 2024 Alianza Petrolera officially confirmed their departure from Barrancabermeja due to the lack of financial support from local authorities while also dropping the word Petrolera from their name and the yellow and black colors that identified them. That same day, Alianza Fútbol Club was presented at a press conference held in Valledupar, where it was confirmed that the club would play under a new crest and would adopt as new colors those representative of the city.

The club played its first match on 21 January 2024, losing 3–1 to Atlético Nacional for the first round of the 2024 Apertura tournament. On 6 March Alianza played their first international match, defeating América de Cali 2–1 in the first stage of the Copa Sudamericana to advance to the group stage of the competition. Despite staging an upset against Cruzeiro with a 3–3 draw at Mineirão in their second group stage match, Alianza failed to make any further progress in the competition.

== Stadium ==
Alianza F.C. play their home matches at Estadio Armando Maestre Pavajeau in Valledupar, built in 1974 and renovated between 2013 and 2015 to host the 2015 South American U-15 Championship. The stadium, with a capacity of 11,000 spectators, served previously as home stadium for former Categoría Primera B club Valledupar F.C., which folded in June 2023.

== Players ==
=== First-team squad ===
As of 24 September 2026

Note: Flags indicate national team as defined under FIFA eligibility rules; some limited exceptions apply. Players may hold more than one non-FIFA nationality.

No.	Pos.	Nation	Player
1	GK	COL	Johan Wallens
3	DF	COL	Kevin Moreno
4	DF	COL	Joseb Mosquera
5	DF	COL	Pedro Franco (captain)
6	MF	COL	Ever Meza
7	MF	COL	Jhair Castillo
8	FW	COL	Jesús Muñoz
10	MF	COL	Deinner Quiñones
11	MF	COL	Sergio Aponzá
12	GK	COL	Juan Camilo Chaverra
14	MF	COL	Charly Villegas
15	MF	COL	Carlos Esparragoza
17	MF	COL	Felipe Pardo
18	FW	COL	Cristian Vergara
19	FW	URU	Francesco Fiorelli
20	FW	COL	Lucas Valencia
21	DF	COL	Fabián Cantillo (on loan from Unión Magdalena)
22	DF	COL	Jesús Figueroa

No.	Pos.	Nation	Player
23	DF	COL	Israel Alba
24	DF	COL	Eduard Banguero
25	FW	COL	Josy Pérez
26	FW	COL	Howenn Rada
27	MF	COL	Yeiner Londoño
28	MF	COL	Jeison Osorio
29	DF	COL	Jean Rojas
30	FW	COL	Jhon Valoyes
32	DF	COL	Juan Viveros
33	DF	COL	Jhildrey Lasso (on loan from Bellinzona)
40	GK	COL	Eduar Esteban
55	MF	URU	Wiston Fernández
60	DF	COL	Yilson Rosales
77	FW	COL	Misael Martínez
88	FW	COL	Leyner Palacios
—	FW	COL	Samuel Nieto
—	FW	COL	Eudy Pérez

=== Out on loan ===
Note: Flags indicate national team as defined under FIFA eligibility rules; some limited exceptions apply. Players may hold more than one non-FIFA nationality.

No.	Pos.	Nation	Player
—	FW	ESA	Mayer Gil (at Deportivo Pasto)

=== Out on loan ===
Note: Flags indicate national team as defined under FIFA eligibility rules; some limited exceptions apply. Players may hold more than one non-FIFA nationality.

No.	Pos.	Nation	Player

== Managers ==
- (Colombia) César Torres (January 2024 – April 2024)
- (Colombia) Hubert Bodhert (April 2024 – February 2026)
- (Colombia) Camilo Ayala (February 2026 – August 2026)
- (Colombia) Flabio Torres (September 2026 – Present)

Source: Worldfootball.net
