= Kevin Moreno =

Colombian footballer (born 2000)

Personal information
- Full name: Kevin Joacid Moreno Sinisterra
- Date of birth: 23 July 2000 (age 26)
- Place of birth: Cali, Colombia
- Position: Defender

Team information
- Current team: Alianza (on loan from Deportivo Cali)
- Number: 3

Youth career
- Deportivo Cali

Senior career*
Years	Team	Apps	(Gls)
2018–	Deportivo Cali	24	(0)
2021	→ Bogotá (loan)	8	(1)
2023	→ Patriotas (loan)	39	(1)
2024	→ Cúcuta Deportivo (loan)	29	(0)
2025–	→ Alianza (loan)	19	(0)

International career^{‡}
2017	Colombia U17	3	(0)
- * Club domestic league appearances and goals as of December 12, 2025 ‡ National team caps and goals as of December 31, 2018

Kevin Moreno (born 23 July 2000) is a Colombian football player who plays as defender for Alianza in the Categoría Primera A, on loan from Deportivo Cali.
