= SCD Independiente (women) =

Spanish football team

- Full name: Sociedad Cultural y Deportiva Independiente (women)
- Nickname: Inde
- Founded: 1999
- Ground: La Antoniana
- Capacity: 300
- Chairman: Francesc Moranta Bauzà
- Manager: Loris Bracone
- League: Autonómica
- 2021–22: Liga Autonomica, 7th
Home colours	Away colours

SCD Independiente is the women's football section of SCD Independiente. The club is located in Palma de Mallorca (Balearic Islands, Spain). It plays in Liga Autonomica, first level of Balearic territorial football and fourth in Spanish women's football.

== History ==
The team has been one of pioneering teams in women's territorial football in Mallorca, as it emerged a few years after recovery of competition on the island in 1996–97 season. Specifically, the section was set up in 1999–2000 season and has since competed without interruption, becoming one of the oldest clubs in competition.

Her long career is only comparable to CE Algaida (1997) and UD Collerense (1999), born in same year as SCD Independiente, but with a much more outstanding and brilliant journey in terms of sports results.

Since its foundation, it has been characterized by maintaining an average sporting potential, without major victories or notable titles. He was only promoted to Liga Autonómica in 2009 (result of creation of this category) and suffered a relegation to Regional in 2019 which he amended following season. On the other hand, it has also had no real chance of making the leap to higher state categories. In any case, this regularity, without ups and downs, has allowed him to maintain great stability while other more ambitious and more media-savvy teams have disappeared.

From beginning, women's team of SCD Independiente has played their matches at La Antoniana, like other teams in the club. The fact that this field was dirt until 2017 has been an obstacle to achieving growth achieved by other clubs in the city.

=== Season to season ===
Season	Tier	Division	Place
1999/00	3	Regional	8th
2000/01	3	Regional	8th
2001/02	3	Regional	8th
2002/03	3	Regional	6th
2003/04	3	Regional	4th
2004/05	3	Regional	6th
2005/06	3	Regional	7th
2006/07	3	Regional	5th
2007/08	3	Regional	6th
2008/09	3	Regional	5th (Note: The team qualified to move up to new Liga Autonomica, but remained in third tier of the system due to its creation.)
2009/10	3	Autonomica	5th
2010/11	3	Autonomica	11th

Season	Tier	Division	Place
2011/12	3	Autonomica	11th
2012/13	3	Autonomica	6th
2013/14	3	Autonomica	5th
2014/15	3	Autonomica	6th
2015/16	3	Autonomica	8th
2016/17	3	Autonomica	9th
2017/18	3	Autonomica	6th
2018/19	3	Autonomica	8th (Note: The team was relegated to Regional, but it really lost two tiers after the restructuring of national categories.)
2019/20	5	Regional	4th
2020/21	4	Autonomica	3rd
2021/22	4	Autonomica	7th (Note: The team remained to Liga Autonomica, but it really lost one tier after the restructuring of national categories.)
2022/23	5	Autonomica	--
