= Johan Wallens =

Colombian footballer (born 1992)

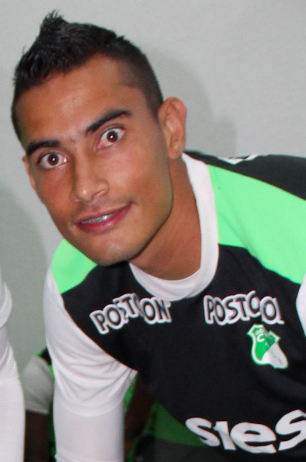
- Johan Wallens with Deportivo Cali in 2016

Personal information
- Full name: Johan Wallens Otálvaro
- Date of birth: 3 August 1992 (age 34)
- Place of birth: Cali, Valle del Cauca Department, Colombia
- Height: 1.85 m (6 ft 1 in)
- Position: Goalkeeper

Team information
- Current team: Alianza
- Number: 1

Senior career*
Years	Team	Apps	(Gls)
2009–2010	Deportivo Cali		
2011	Cortuluá		
2012	C.F. Pachuca		
2013–2014	Deportivo Cali	0	(0)
2015	Real Santander		
2016–2023	Deportivo Cali	32	(0)
2017–2018	→ Atlético Cali (loan)	3	(0)
2021	→ Unión Magdalena (loan)	4	(0)
2012	→ Bogotá (loan)	25	(0)
2024	Unión Magdalena	30	(0)
2025–	Alianza	12	(0)

International career
2007	Colombia U17		
2001–2002	Colombia U20		
Medal record
- In 2009, he became the youngest goalkeeper in his debut with the team verdiblanco (age 16)
- Campeon Superliga Colombia (2014)
- * Club domestic league appearances and goals as of 12 December 2025

Johan Wallens Otálvaro (born 3 August 1992) is a Colombian footballer who plays for Alianza.

== National team ==
Wallens was part of the Colombia national under-17 football team in the 2009 FIFA U-17 World Cup.

=== South American Championships ===
Championship	Host country	Result
Sudamericano Sub-15 of 2007	Brazil	First Phase
Sudamericano Sub-17 of 2009	Chile	Fourth place

=== FIFA U-17 World Cup ===
Championship	Host country	Result	Split
2009 FIFA U-17 World Cup	Nigeria	Fourth place	0

== Clubs ==
In the year 2012 he briefly moved to the Mexican club Pachuca and in the year 2013 returned to Deportivo Cali.

Club	Country	Year
Deportivo Cali	Colombia	2009–2010
Cortuluá	Colombia	2011
Pachuca	Mexico	2012
Deportivo Cali	Colombia	2013–2014
Real Santander	Colombia	2015
Deportivo Cali	Colombia	2016 – present

== List of winners ==
=== National championships ===
Title	Club	Country	Year
Copa Colombia	Deportivo Cali	Colombia	2010
Superliga Colombiana	Deportivo Cali	Colombia	2014
