= Jonathan Risueño =

Spanish footballer

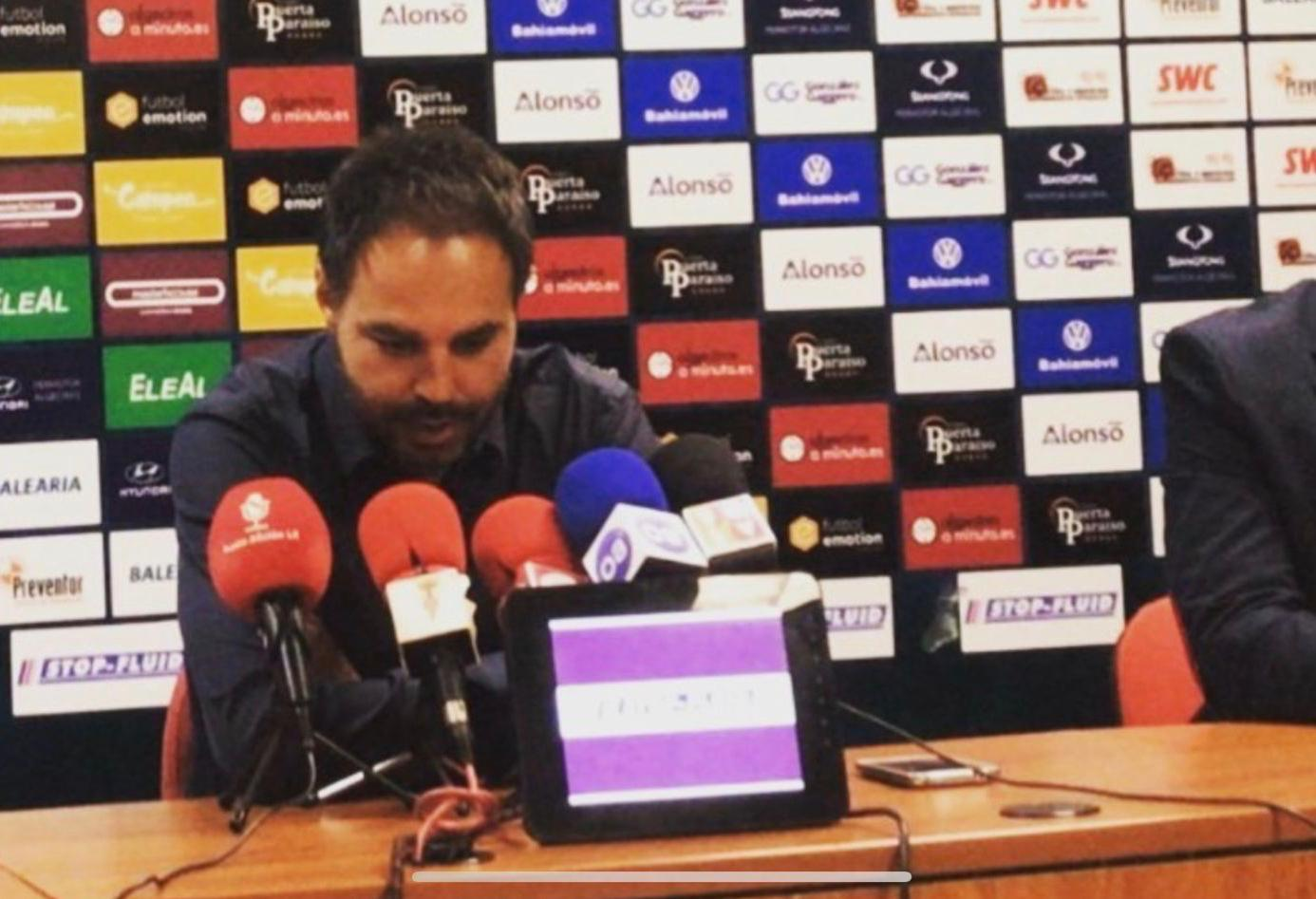
- Risueño in 2020

Personal information
- Full name: Matías Jonathan Risueño Luján
- Date of birth: 14 October 1982 (age 44)
- Place of birth: Alborache, Spain
- Position: Forward

Youth career
- Valencia

Senior career*
Years	Team	Apps	(Gls)
- Buñol
- Valladolid B
- Soledad
- Calasparra
2006–2007	Castelldefels		
2007	Palafrugell		
2007	Badalona B		
2007–2008	Atlético Monzón	17	(3)
2008	La Nucía		
- Vilafranca

Managerial career
- 2013–2014: Independiente Camp Redó
- 2014–2015: Rotlet Molinar
- 2015–2016: Callosa Deportiva
- 2019–2021: Hospitalet
- 2022: Bogotá
- 2022–2023: Olot
- 2023: Patriotas
- 2024: Saguntino
- 2024: Tudelano
- 2025: Patriotas
- 2025: Águilas Doradas
- 2026: Deportivo Pasto
- * Club domestic league appearances and goals

Matías Jonatan Risueño Luján (born 14 October 1982) is a Spanish football manager and former footballer who played as a forward.

== Playing career ==
Born in Alborache, Valencian Community, Risueño was a Valencia CF youth graduate. After making his senior debut with CD Buñol, he subsequently represented Real Valladolid B, CD Soledad and Calasparra FC in Tercera División.

Ahead of the 2006–07 season, Risueño joined UE Castelldefels also in the fourth tier, scoring on his debut. In January 2007, he moved to fellow league team FC Palafrugell, but had an altercation with the club's manager José Luis Ruiz during a match against CE Europa, after taking (and missing) a penalty kick despite the manager's urges to another player to take it; he subsequently moved to CF Badalona's reserves in Primera Catalana at the end of the month.

In July 2007, Risueño moved to Atlético Monzón, but signed for fellow fourth tier side CF La Nucía the following 31 January. He also represented FC Vilafranca before retiring.

== Managerial career ==
After retiring, Risueño was an advisor of RCD Mallorca's president, and began his managerial career with SCD Independiente in the Regional Preferente de Mallorca in 2013. On 5 June of the following year, he took over fellow fifth division side UD Rotlet Molinar.

On 19 February 2015, Risueño was sacked from Rotlet. In July, he became a manager and sporting director of UD Almansa, but was dismissed from the club three days after his presentation due to his lack of a coaching license.

On 17 October, Risueño became a sporting director of CD Torrevieja, and became a manager of Callosa Deportiva CF on 7 December, while still keeping his role at Torrevieja. In June 2016, after managing to avoid relegation with the club in the Regional Preferente de la Comunitat Valenciana, he left to become a sporting director at Segunda División B side CE L'Hospitalet.

On 9 April 2019, Risueño replaced Xavi Molist as manager of Hospi. On 3 June 2020, after achieving promotion to the third level, he signed a new two-year contract with the club.

On 28 May 2021, after suffering immediate relegation, Risueño resigned from Hospitalet due to "personal reasons". In January 2022, he moved abroad for the first time in his career, after being named manager of Categoría Primera B side Bogotá FC.

Risueño left Bogotá in June 2022, and returned to his home country on 10 November to take over UE Olot in Segunda Federación. He was dismissed on 26 January 2023, after nine winless matches.

On 1 September 2023, Risueño returned to Colombia after replacing Juan David Niño at the helm of Patriotas Boyacá also in the second division. He led the club to a top tier promotion as champions, defeating Fortaleza CEIF in the grand final, but Patriotas announced his departure on 11 December.

On 31 January 2024, Risueño returned to his home country after being named manager of Atlético Saguntino in the fourth tier, but left on 11 April, after just ten matches, for "purely non-sporting reasons".

On 28 January 2025, Risueño's return to Patriotas was confirmed. He left the club on 12 August, following a 6–0 loss to Once Caldas in the 2025 Copa Colombia in which Patriotas lined up an under-20 team by order of the club's president, something Risueño disagreed with.

On 5 September 2025, Risueño was appointed as manager of Categoría Primera A club Águilas Doradas. After missing out on qualification for the final stages of the 2025 Finalización, he resigned from Águilas on 26 November, and five days later he was announced as manager of fellow Primera A club Deportivo Pasto for the 2026 season.

With Pasto, Risueño reached the quarter-finals of the 2026 Apertura, but he was sacked on 24 August 2026 after starting the 2026 Finalización tournament with a 5-match losing streak.

== Managerial statistics ==
As of match played 3 August 2025

Managerial record by team and tenure
Team	Nat	From	To	Record					Ref.
Team	Nat	From	To	G	W	D	L	Win %	Ref.
Independiente Camp Redó	(Spain)	1 July 2013	5 June 2014	40	16	14	10	40.00	
Rotlet Molinar	(Spain)	5 June 2014	19 February 2015	25	15	6	4	60.00	
Callosa Deportiva	(Spain)	7 December 2015	27 June 2016	20	9	3	8	45.00	
Hospitalet	(Spain)	9 April 2019	28 May 2021	72	32	18	22	44.44	
Bogotá	(Colombia)	4 January 2022	14 July 2022	23	8	7	8	34.78	
Olot	(Spain)	10 November 2022	26 January 2023	9	0	5	4	0.00	
Patriotas	(Colombia)	1 September 2023	11 December 2023	12	6	1	5	50.00	
Saguntino	(Spain)	31 January 2024	11 April 2024	10	4	2	4	40.00	
Tudelano	(Spain)	17 June 2024	27 December 2024	18	6	5	7	33.33	
Patriotas	(Colombia)	28 January 2025	12 August 2025	29	15	5	9	51.72	
Total				258	111	66	81	43.02	—

== Honours ==
Patriotas Boyacá

- Categoría Primera B: 2023
