= David González (footballer, born 1982) =

Colombian footballer

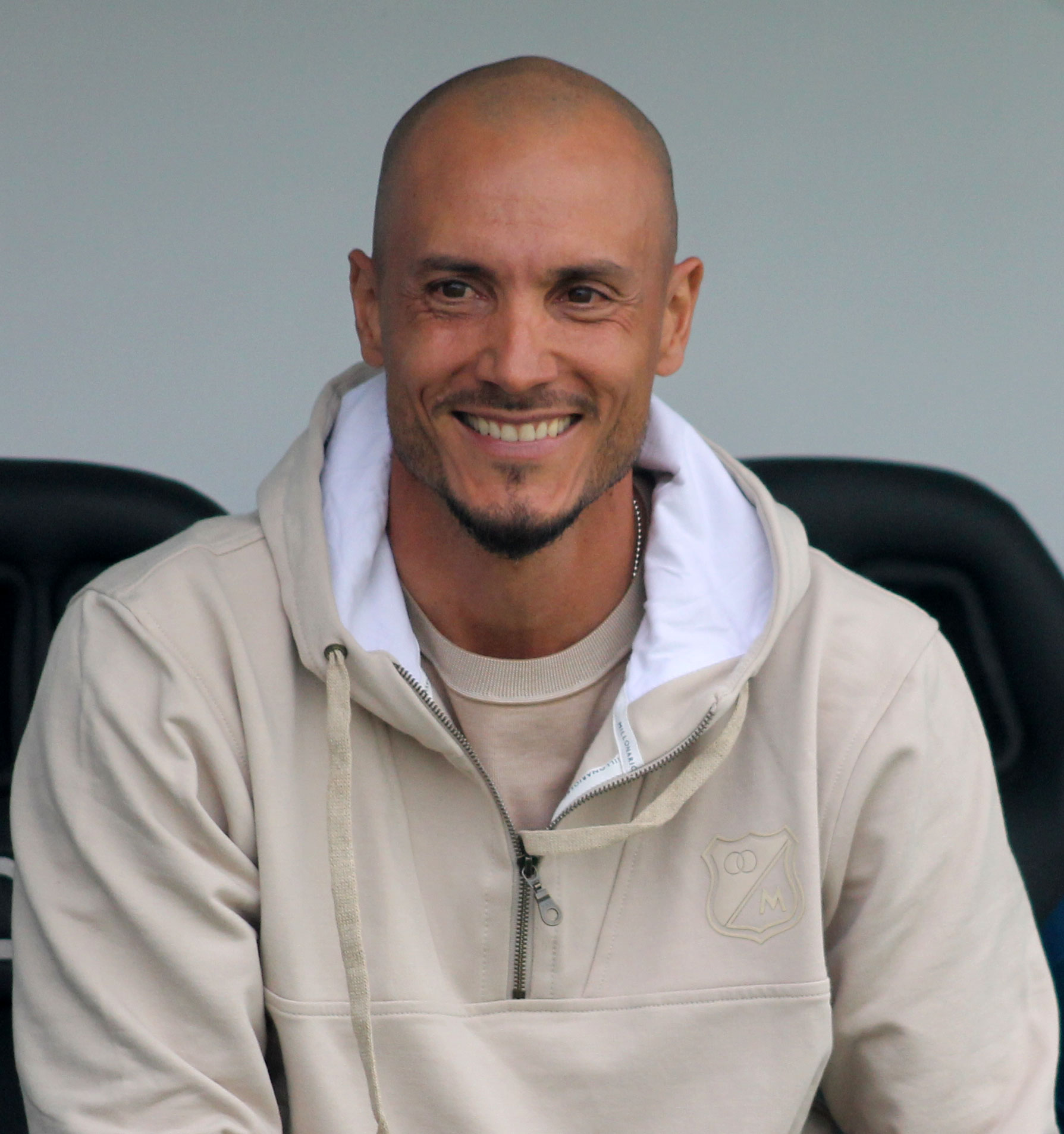
- González in 2025

Personal information
- Full name: David González Giraldo
- Date of birth: 20 July 1982 (age 44)
- Place of birth: Medellín, Colombia
- Height: 1.92 m (6 ft 4 in)
- Position: Goalkeeper

Team information
- Current team: América de Cali (manager)

Youth career
- 2001: Atlético Nacional

Senior career*
Years	Team	Apps	(Gls)
2002–2005	Independiente Medellín	127	(0)
2006–2007	Deportivo Cali	57	(0)
2007–2008	Çaykur Rizespor	30	(0)
2008–2009	Huracán	0	(0)
2009–2012	Manchester City	0	(0)
2011	→ Leeds United (loan)	0	(0)
2011	→ Aberdeen (loan)	14	(0)
2012	Brighton & Hove Albion	4	(0)
2012	Barnsley	4	(0)
2013	Deportivo Pasto	4	(0)
2014	Águilas Doradas	22	(0)
2015–2019	Independiente Medellín	71	(0)
2020	Deportivo Cali	21	(0)
Total		354	(0)

International career
2004	Colombia Olympic	2	(0)
2005–2020	Colombia	2	(0)

Managerial career
- 2022–2023: Independiente Medellín
- 2023–2024: Deportes Tolima
- 2025: Millonarios
- 2025–: América de Cali
- * Club domestic league appearances and goals

David González Giraldo (born 20 July 1982), known as David González, is a Colombian football manager and former footballer who played as a goalkeeper. He is the current manager of América de Cali.

== Playing career ==
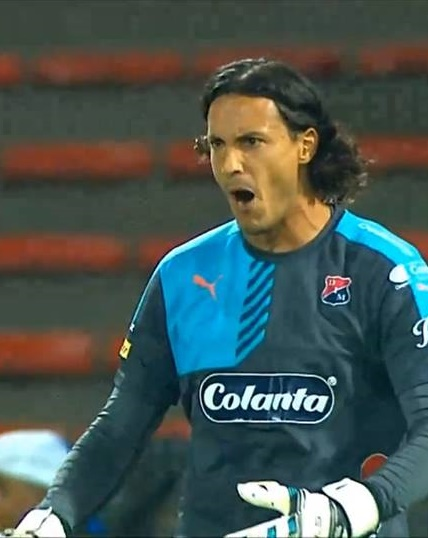
González playing for Independiente Medellín in 2015

Born in Medellín, González began his career at his hometown club Independiente Medellín. In 2002, at the age of 20, he became the youngest goalkeeping champion in the history of Colombian football. In 2006, he moved to Deportivo Cali, before going to Çaykur Rizespor, where he spent two seasons. In 2009, he spent a short time at Club Atlético Huracán in Argentina before becoming a free agent. González has played over 300 professional club games in South America and Turkey along with the SPL and the English Championship.

=== Manchester City ===
At the end of 2009 he had a trial with Manchester City, which proved successful, and signed in January 2010. González was not named, in Manchester City's 25-man squad for the 2010–11 season but became the first choice reserve team goalkeeper, where he made some outstanding performances, alerting many Championship clubs to a potential loan move.

==== Leeds United loan ====
On 31 January 2011, on transfer deadline day, González signed a short-term loan with Leeds United With injuries to Shay Given and Gunnar Nielsen, City manager Roberto Mancini had hinted he may recall González as third choice City keeper for the rest of the season. However, González remained at Leeds as cover for Kasper Schmeichel and Shane Higgs. On 9 May, González returned to City.

==== Aberdeen loan ====
On 21 June, it was announced that Manchester City were in talks with Scottish Premier League side Aberdeen in regards to a loan move for González. Aberdeen completed the signing of González on 29 June 2011 on a 6-month loan from Manchester City. González became first choice keeper for the Dons until October with regular starter Jamie Langfield sidelined after suffering a seizure in the 2010–11 season. González made his debut against St Johnstone in the opening game of the season.

=== Brighton & Hove Albion ===
On 19 January 2012, González signed a five-month temporary contract as cover with Brighton & Hove Albion after his contract with Manchester City was cancelled by mutual consent.

González made his debut in the 2–2 draw against Watford on 17 April 2012 going on to play three more games including playing the last game of the season against Barnsley where he kept a clean sheet, Gonzalez left Brighton after the expiration of his contract at the end of April 2012.

=== Barnsley ===
At the beginning of the 2012–13 season González signed a one-month deal with Barnsley as cover, due to the injuries of the No.1 and No.2 goalkeepers, playing three games in the Championship. He then moved back to Colombia to sign for Deportivo Pasto in the Colombian first division for one season.

== International career ==
In 2004, González was called up to take part of the 2004 CONMEBOL Men Pre-Olympic Tournament disputed in Chile. He played for the senior team in a 2–1 win against South Korea on 15 January 2005.

== Managerial career ==
On 28 June 2022, González was appointed as manager of Independiente Medellín. He led Independiente Medellín to a runner-up finish in the 2022 Finalización tournament but left the club on a mutual agreement on 8 May 2023.

On 18 September 2023, González was confirmed as the new manager of Deportes Tolima. With Tolima, González reached the finals of the 2024 Finalización tournament, which they lost to Atlético Nacional, before resigning on 31 December 2024. Four days later, González was announced as manager of Millonarios, from where he was sacked on 20 August 2025.

On 9 September 2025, González was appointed as manager of fellow Categoría Primera A club América de Cali.
