= Geovanni Banguera =

Colombian footballer (born 1995)

Personal information
- Full name: Geovanni Banguera Delgado
- Date of birth: 15 December 1995 (age 30)
- Place of birth: El Charco, Colombia
- Height: 1.87 m (6 ft 2 in)
- Position: Goalkeeper

Team information
- Current team: Deportivo Pasto
- Number: 12

Youth career
- 2014: Deportivo Pasto

Senior career*
Years	Team	Apps	(Gls)
2015–2022	Atlético Huila	93	(0)
2019	→ Santa Fe (loan)	13	(0)
2022–2023	Patriotas Boyacá	5	(0)
2023-2025	Jaguares de Córdoba	35	(0)
2025-	Águilas Doradas	10	(0)
- * Club domestic league appearances and goals as of 12 December 2025

Geovanni Banguera Delgado (born 15 December 1995) is a footballer from El Charco, Colombia who plays as a goalkeeper for Deportivo Pasto.

== Honours ==
Atlético Huila

- Categoría Primera B: 2020
