= Camilo Ayala =

Colombian footballer (born 1986)

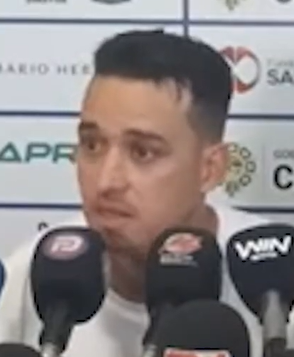
- Ayala in 2026

Personal information
- Full name: Camilo Andrés Ayala Quintero
- Date of birth: 23 June 1986 (age 40)
- Place of birth: Medellín, Colombia
- Height: 1.79 m (5 ft 10 in)
- Position: Midfielder

Youth career
- Deportivo Cali

Senior career*
Years	Team	Apps	(Gls)
2007–2008	Córdoba FC		
2008–2010	Deportivo Cali	21	(2)
2010	La Equidad	15	(3)
2011	América de Cali	12	(0)
2011–2012	Atlético Huila	39	(0)
2013	La Equidad	22	(0)
2014	Alianza Petrolera	13	(0)
2015	Atlético Huila	23	(1)
2016–2017	América de Cali	65	(1)
2018	Rionegro Águilas	39	(2)
2019–2024	Deportivo Pasto	157	(7)

Managerial career
- 2025: Deportivo Pasto
- 2026: Alianza
- * Club domestic league appearances and goals

Camilo Andrés Ayala Quintero (born 23 June 1986) is a Colombian football manager and former footballer, who mostly played as a defensive midfielder but could also play as a winger. He most recently managed the Colombian club Alianza.

== Playing career ==
Born in Medellín, Ayala was a product of the youth setup of Deportivo Cali. He began his professional career in 2007 with Córdoba F.C. in the Colombian Categoría Primera B, returning to Deportivo Cali the following year. After playing 21 matches with the club, he moved to La Equidad in 2010 where he became a first-choice starter for manager Alexis García, playing 11 matches there before being signed by América de Cali for the 2011 season. Since América was going through a difficult financial situation at the time, he left the club in June 2011 due to non-payment of wages.

Following his resignation from América de Cali, Ayala joined Atlético Huila with which he reached the final stages of the 2012 Apertura tournament, returning to La Equidad in 2013. For the following season he was signed by Alianza Petrolera, where he had a consistent season ensuring that the team avoided relegation.

In 2016, Ayala returned to América de Cali, who had been relegated in 2011 and were to start their fifth consecutive season in the second tier. He played 31 matches and scored one goal in a campaign that led to the club's promotion to Primera A as well as the Primera B championship. After helping América achieve promotion and maintain themselves in the top tier, Ayala played for Rionegro Águilas and Deportivo Pasto, where he spent five years as team captain from 2019 to 2024.

== Managerial career ==
After retiring with Deportivo Pasto at the end of 2024, Ayala was appointed by the club as its manager for the 2025 season on 30 December 2024. He resigned from Pasto the following 25 September, due to the team's poor performance in the 2025 Finalización tournament. In his first managerial experience, Ayala had 12 wins, 10 draws and 15 losses in 37 matches.

On 18 February 2026, Ayala replaced Hubert Bodhert at the helm of Alianza also in the top tier. He was dismissed on 30 August 2026, after a winless start to the 2026 Finalización tournament and a 5–1 loss to Atlético Nacional.

== Honours ==
América de Cali

- Categoría Primera B (1): 2016
