= 2006 Categoría Primera A season =

The 2006 Categoría Primera A season is the 59th season of Colombia's top-flight football league.

== Campeonato Apertura ==
The Copa Mustang I 2006 was the first tournament of the 2006 season of Fútbol Profesional Colombiano, first division in Colombian football. The new season started in Saturday February 4 and finished Sunday June 25.

== Tournament Fixtures ==
=== Standings ===
| Pos | Team | Pts | GP | W | D | L | GF | GA | Dif |
|---|---|---|---|---|---|---|---|---|---|
| 1. | Once Caldas | 37 | 18 | 10 | 7 | 1 | 31 | 15 | +16 |
| 2. | Cúcuta Deportivo | 37 | 18 | 11 | 4 | 3 | 29 | 14 | +15 |
| 3. | Deportes Tolima | 32 | 18 | 9 | 5 | 4 | 36 | 19 | +17 |
| 4. | Atlético Nacional | 30 | 18 | 9 | 3 | 6 | 27 | 19 | +8 |
| 5. | Deportivo Pereira | 29 | 18 | 7 | 8 | 3 | 20 | 15 | +5 |
| 6. | Millonarios | 28 | 18 | 7 | 7 | 4 | 27 | 23 | +4 |
| 7. | Deportivo Cali | 28 | 18 | 8 | 4 | 6 | 20 | 17 | +3 |
| 8. | Deportivo Pasto | 27 | 18 | 7 | 6 | 5 | 28 | 21 | +7 |
| 9. | Deportes Quindío | 27 | 18 | 8 | 3 | 7 | 18 | 17 | +1 |
| 10. | América de Cali | 27 | 18 | 8 | 3 | 7 | 20 | 25 | -5 |
| 11. | Envigado FC | 22 | 18 | 5 | 7 | 6 | 20 | 22 | -2 |
| 12. | Atlético Bucaramanga | 21 | 18 | 6 | 3 | 9 | 17 | 23 | -6 |
| 13. | Boyacá Chicó | 20 | 18 | 4 | 8 | 6 | 19 | 22 | -3 |
| 14. | Independiente Santa Fe | 20 | 18 | 5 | 5 | 8 | 24 | 32 | -8 |
| 15. | CD Atlético Huila | 20 | 18 | 6 | 2 | 10 | 17 | 33 | -16 |
| 16. | Atlético Junior | 17 | 18 | 4 | 5 | 9 | 22 | 29 | -7 |
| 17. | Independiente Medellín | 14 | 18 | 3 | 5 | 10 | 15 | 28 | -13 |
| 18. | Real Cartagena | 7 | 18 | 2 | 1 | 15 | 14 | 30 | -16 |

Pts=Puntos; GP=Games played; W=Wins; D=Draw; L=Lost; GF=Goals Favored; GA=Goals Allowed; DIF=Difference

| Classified for Semifinal Group Stage. |
| Eliminated |

=== Results ===
Fixture 1 - February 5, 2006
| Home | Score | Away |
|---|---|---|
| Huila | 1 - 1 | Millonarios |
| Pasto | 1 - 1 | Pereira |
| Quindío | 1 - 0 | Real Cartagena |
| Medellín | 2 - 0 | Bucaramanga |
| América | 0 - 3 | Deportivo Cali |
| Cúcuta | 3 - 2 | Atlético Nacional |
| Junior | 3 - 2 | Envigado |
| Once Caldas | 2 - 2 | Boyacá Chicó |
| Santa Fe | 0 - 2 | Tolima |

Fixture 2 - February 12, 2006
| Home | Score | Away |
|---|---|---|
| Tolima | 2 - 0 | Huila |
| Boyacá Chicó | 2 - 0 | Santa Fe |
| Envigado | 1 - 1 | Onca Caldas |
| Atlético Nacional | 2 - 2 | Junior |
| Deportivo Cali | 0 - 2 | Cúcuta |
| Bucaramanga | 1 - 0 | América |
| Real Cartagena | 2 - 2 | Medellín |
| Pereira | 1 - 0 | Quindio |
| Millonarios | 1 - 0 | Pasto |

Fixture 3 - February 19, 2006
| Home | Score | Away |
|---|---|---|
| Pasto | 4 - 1 | Huila |
| Quindío | 1 - 1 | Millonarios |
| Medellín | 1 - 0 | Pereira |
| América | 2 - 1 | Real Cartagena |
| Cúcuta | 1 - 1 | Bucaramanga |
| Junior | 0 - 0 | Deportivo Cali |
| Once Caldas | 1 - 0 | Atlético Nacional |
| Santa Fe | 3 - 3 | Envigado |
| Tolima | 3 - 1 | Boyacá Chicó |

Fixture 4 - February 26, 2006
| Home | Score | Away |
|---|---|---|
| Huila | 3 - 1 | Boyacá Chicó |
| Envigado | 3 - 7 | Tolima |
| Atlético Nacional | 2 - 1 | Santa Fe |
| Deportivo Cali | 1 - 2 | Once Caldas |
| Bucaramanga | 2 - 0 | Junior |
| Real Cartagena | 0 - 1 | Cúcuta |
| Pereira | 2 - 2 | América |
| Millonarios | 3 - 0 | Medellín |
| Pasto | 2 - 3 | Quindío |

Fixture 5 - March 5, 2006
| Home | Score | Away |
|---|---|---|
| Quindío | 2 - 0 | Huila |
| Medellín | 2 - 2 | Pasto |
| América | 1 - 0 | Millonarios |
| Cúcuta | 0 - 1 | Pereira |
| Junior | 2 - 0 | Real Cartagena |
| Once Caldas | 1 - 0 | Bucaramanga |
| Santa Fe | 2 - 1 | Deportivo Cali |
| Tolima | 5 - 1 | Atlético Nacional |
| Boyacá Chicó | 0 - 0 | Envigado |

Fixture 7 - March 8, 2006
| Home | Score | Away |
|---|---|---|
| Huila | 1 - 0 | Envigado |
| Atlético Nacional | 1 - 0 | Boyacá Chicó |
| Deportivo Cali | 2 - 1 | Tolima |
| Bucaramanga | 2 - 1 | Santa Fe |
| Real Cartagena | 1 - 2 | Once Caldas |
| Pereira | 1 - 0 | Junior |
| Millonarios | 1 - 0 | Cúcuta |
| Pasto | 2 - 1 | América |
| Quindío | 2 - 0 | Medellín |

Fixture 7 - March 15, 2006
| Home | Score | Away |
|---|---|---|
| Medellín | 0 - 1 | Huila |
| América | 0 - 1 | Quindío |
| Cúcuta | 3 - 1 | Pasto |
| Junior | 4 - 4 | Millonarios |
| Once Caldas | 2 - 1 | Pereira |
| Santa Fe | 2 - 1 | Real Cartagena |
| Tolima | 0 - 0 | Bucaramanga |
| Boyacá Chicó | 1 - 1 | Deportivo Cali |
| Envigado | 1 - 0 (Note: Was played February 22) | Atlético Nacional |

Fixture 8 - March 19, 2006
| Home | Score | Away |
|---|---|---|
| Huila | 1 - 0 | Atlético Nacional |
| Deportivo Cali | 0 - 1 | Envigado |
| Bucaramanga | 1 - 0 | Boyacá Chicó |
| Real Cartagena | 2 - 1 | Tolima |
| Pereira | 1 - 1 | Santa Fe |
| Millonarios | 1 - 1 | Once Caldas |
| Pasto | 2 - 0 | Junior |
| Quindío | 0 - 1 | Cúcuta |
| Medellín | 2 - 3 | América |

Fixture 9 - March 26, 2006
| Home | Score | Away |
|---|---|---|
| Boyacá Chicó | 0 - 0 | Pasto |
| Envigado | 2 - 0 | Quindío |
| Atlético Nacional | 2 - 1 | Medellín |
| Deportivo Cali | 1 - 1 | América |
| Bucaramanga | 2 - 1 | Cúcuta |
| Real Cartagena | 1 - 2 | Junior |
| Pereira | 0 - 0 | Once Caldas |
| Millonarios | 3 - 3 | Santa Fe |
| Huila | 1 - 4 | Tolima |

Fixture - April 2, 2006
| Home | Score | Away |
|---|---|---|
| América | 2 - 1 | Huila |
| Cúcuta | 1 - 0 | Medellín |
| Junior | 0 - 1 | Quindío |
| Once Caldas | 4 - 2 | Pasto |
| Santa Fe | 1 - 3 | Millonarios |
| Tolima | 0 - 0 | Pasto |
| Boyacá Chicó | 4 - 2 | Real Cartagena |
| Envigado | 0 - 0 | Bucaramanga |
| Atlético Nacional | 2 - 0 | Deportivo Cali |

Fixture 11 - April 9, 2006
| Home | Score | Away |
|---|---|---|
| Huila | 3 - 1 | Deportivo Cali |
| Bucaramanga | 0 - 2 | Atlético Nacional |
| Real Cartagena | 0 - 1 | Evnigado |
| Pereira | 1 - 1 | Boyacá Chicó |
| Milonarios | 0 - 3 | Tolima |
| Pasto | 4 - 1 | Santa Fe |
| Quindío | 1 - 3 | Once Caldas |
| Medellín | 3 - 1 | Junior |
| América | 0 - 1 | Cúcuta |

Fixture 12 - April 16, 2006
| Home | Score | Away |
|---|---|---|
| Cúcuta | 4 - 0 | Huila |
| Junior | 1 - 2 | América |
| Once Caldas | 6 - 0 | Medellín |
| Santa Fe | 0 - 0 | Quindío |
| Tolima | 1 - 1 | Pasto |
| Boyacá Chicó | 0 - 2 | Millonarios |
| Envigado | 2 - 0 | Pereira |
| Atlético Nacional | 1 - 0 | Real Cartagena |
| Deportivo Cali | 4 - 1 | Bucaramanga |

Fixture 13 - April 23, 2006
| Home | Score | Away |
|---|---|---|
| Huila | 2 - 1 | Bucaramanga |
| Real Cartagena | 0 - 1 | Deportivo Cali |
| Pereira | 2 - 1 | Atlético Nacional |
| Millonarios | 1 - 1 | Envigado |
| Pasto | 1 - 1 | Boyacá Chicó |
| Quindío | 2 - 1 | Tolima |
| Medellín | 0 - 1 | Santa Fe |
| América | 0 - 0 | Once Caldas |
| Cúcuta | 2 - 0 | Junior |

Fixture 14 - April 30, 2006
| Home | Score | Away |
|---|---|---|
| Junior | 3 - 0 | Huila |
| Once Caldas | 2 - 2 | Cúcuta |
| Santa Fe | 1 - 3 | América |
| Tolima | 0 - 0 | Medellín |
| Boyacá Chicó | 1 - 2 | Quindío |
| Envigado | 0 - 1 | Pasto |
| Atlético Nacional | 2 - 0 | Millonarios |
| Deportivo Cali | 1 - 1 | Pereira |
| Bucaramanga | 0 - 1 | Real Cartagena |

Fixture 15 - May 7, 2006
| Home | Score | Away |
|---|---|---|
| Huila | 1 - 3 | Real Cartagena |
| Pereira | 3 - 2 | Bucaramanga |
| Millonarios | 0 - 1 | Deportivo Cali |
| Pasto | 0 - 0 | Atlético Nacional |
| Quindío | 1 - 1 | Envigado |
| Medellín | 1 - 2 | Boyacá Chicó |
| América | 1 - 0 | Tolima |
| Cúcuta | 2 - 0 | Santa Fe |
| Junior | 0 - 0 | Once Caldas |

Fixture 16 - May 13, 2006
| Home | Score | Away |
|---|---|---|
| Once Caldas | 1 - 0 | Huila |
| Santa Fe | 4 - 2 | Junior |
| Tolima | 2 - 2 | Cúcuta |
| Boyacá Chicó | 1 - 0 | América |
| Envigado | 0 - 0 | Medellín |
| Atlético Nacional | 2 - 1 | Junior |
| Deportivo Cali | 1 - 0 | Pasto |
| Bucaramanga | 2 - 3 | Millonarios |
| Real Cartagena | 0 - 1 | Pereira |

Fixture 17 - May 17, 2006
| Home | Score | Away |
|---|---|---|
| Huila | 0 - 3 | Pereira |
| Millonarios | 2 - 1 | Real Cartagena |
| Pasto | 2 - 1 | Bucaramanga |
| Quindío | 0 - 1 | Deportivo Cali |
| Medellín | 1 - 1 | Atlético Nacional |
| América | 2 - 1 | Envigado |
| Cúcuta | 1 - 1 | Boyacá Chicó |
| Junior | 1 - 2 | Tolima |
| Once Caldas | 0 - 2 | Santa Fe |

Fixture 18 - May 21, 2006
| Home | Score | Away |
|---|---|---|
| Santa Fe | 1 - 1 | Huila |
| Tolima | 1 - 3 | Once Caldas |
| Boyacá Chicó | 1 - 1 | Junior |
| Envigado | 1 - 2 | Cúcuta |
| Atlético Nacional | 6 - 0 | América |
| Bucaramanga | 1 - 0 | Quindío |
| Deportivo Cali | 1 - 0 | Medellín |
| Real Cartagena | 0 - 3 | Pasto |
| Pereira | 1 - 1 | Millonarios |

== Semifinals Group Stage ==
The second phase of the 2006 tournament consisted of two groups of 4 teams semifinals. This was disputed by the best eight teams from the first phase of the tournament. the winners of each group will face on the finals to define a champion.

=== Group A ===
| R | Pos | Team | Pts | GP | W | D | L | GF | GA | Dif |
|---|---|---|---|---|---|---|---|---|---|---|
| (1) | 1. | Deportivo Cali | 12 | 6 | 3 | 3 | 0 | 11 | 6 | +5 |
| (5) | 2. | Deportes Tolima | 9 | 6 | 2 | 3 | 1 | 9 | 8 | +1 |
| (7) | 3. | Once Caldas | 7 | 6 | 2 | 1 | 3 | 7 | 10 | -3 |
| (3) | 4. | Deportivo Pereira | 4 | 6 | 1 | 2 | 3 | 10 | 13 | -3 |

Fixture 1 - May 31, 2006
| Home | Score | Away |
|---|---|---|
| Once Caldas | 1 - 1 | Tolima |
| Deportivo Cali | 4 - 1 | Pereira |

Fixture 2 - June 4, 2006
| Home | Score | Away |
|---|---|---|
| Tolima | 0 - 0 | Deportivo Cali |
| Pereira | 1 - 2 | Once Caldas |

Fixture 3 - June 7, 2006
| Home | Score | Away |
|---|---|---|
| Tolima | 2 - 1 | Pereira |
| Once Caldas | 0 - 1 | Deportivo Cali |

Fixture 4 - June 11, 2006
| Home | Score | Away |
|---|---|---|
| Pereira | 4 - 0 | Tolima |
| Deportivo Cali | 2 - 1 | Once Caldas |

Fixture 5 - June 14, 2006
| Home | Score | Away |
|---|---|---|
| Deportivo Cali | 2 - 2 | Tolima |
| Once Caldas | 3 - 1 | Pereira |

Fixture 6 - June 18, 2006
| Home | Score | Away |
|---|---|---|
| Tolima | 4 - 0 | Once Caldas |
| Deportivo Pereira | 2 - 2 | Deportivo Cali |

=== Group B ===
| R | Pos | Team | Pts | GP | W | D | L | GF | GA | Dif |
|---|---|---|---|---|---|---|---|---|---|---|
| (6) | 1. | Deportivo Pasto | 13 | 6 | 4 | 1 | 1 | 9 | 5 | +4 |
| (2) | 2. | Cúcuta Deportivo | 10 | 6 | 3 | 1 | 2 | 8 | 8 | 0 |
| (8) | 3. | Atlético Nacional | 6 | 6 | 2 | 0 | 4 | 9 | 10 | -1 |
| (4) | 4. | Millonarios | 5 | 6 | 1 | 2 | 3 | 5 | 8 | -3 |

Fixture 1 - May 30, 2006
| Home | Score | Away |
|---|---|---|
| Pasto | 2 - 1 | Atlético Nacional |
| Millonarios | 1 - 1 | Cúcuta |

Fixture 2 - June 4, 2006
| Home | Score | Away |
|---|---|---|
| Atlético Nacional | 2 - 0 | Millonarios |
| Cúcuta | 0 - 1 | Pasto |

Fixture 3 - June 7, 2006
| Home | Score | Away |
|---|---|---|
| Atlético Nacional | 2 - 3 | Cúcuta |
| Pasto | 1 - 1 | Millonarios |

Fixture 4 - June 11, 2006
| Home | Score | Away |
|---|---|---|
| Cúcuta | 2 - 1 | Atlético Nacional |
| Millonarios | 2 - 0 | Pasto |

Fixture 5 - June 14, 2006
| Home | Score | Away |
|---|---|---|
| Millonarios | 0 - 2 | Atlético Nacional |
| Pasto | 2 - 0 | Cúcuta |

Fixture 6 - June 18, 2006
| Home | Score | Away |
|---|---|---|
| Atlético Nacional | 1 - 3 | Pasto |
| Cúcuta | 2 - 1 | Millonarios |

== Final ==
| Date | City | Home | Score | Away |
|---|---|---|---|---|
| June 21 | Cali | Deportivo Cali | 0 - 1 | Deportivo Pasto |
| June 25 | Pasto | Deportivo Pasto | 1 - 1 | Deportivo Cali |
Deportivo Pasto Deportivo Pasto is the champion for an aggregate score of 2 - 1.

== Campeonato Finalización ==
2006-II - Copa Mustang or Torneo Finalización 2006 was the 64th installment of the Mustang Cup. It began on the night of July 15, 2006 with the opening match between Atlético Nacional and Cúcuta Deportivo in Medellín at the stadium Estadio Atanasio Girardot. 18 teams compete against one another and played each weekend until November 12. At that point, the top 8 teams in the league stage advanced to the group stage, each group with 4 teams. From that point on the teams play on a home and away basis, for a total of a six matches each. The winner of both groups at the end advance to the home-and-away final.

In the league stage, last year's Finalización champions Deportivo Cali were knocked out after a last-round defeat to Independiente Medellín, while Envigado FC were relegated to Primera B after losing 12 of their 18 games, thus ending with the worst point average. América de Cali played its worst season, losing 11 matches and struggling at the bottom of the table.

The Group Stage saw Deportes Tolima getting a dramatic 2–1 win over Atlético Nacional thus becoming leaders of Group A while in Group B, Independiente Medellín thrashed Millonarios 4–0 in the Estadio Atanasio Girardot only to learn that Cúcuta Deportivo and Atlético Huila tied 0-0. The champions were Cúcuta Deportivo defeating Deportes Tolima in the finals with the total aggregate score of 2-1 from two matches.

== Schedule ==
=== Standings ===
Standings until November 16, 2006

| Pos | Team | Pts | GP | W | D | L | GS | GA | Dif |
|---|---|---|---|---|---|---|---|---|---|
| 1. | Deportes Tolima | 34 | 18 | 10 | 4 | 4 | 31 | 19 | +12 |
| 2. | Independiente Medellín | 32 | 18 | 10 | 2 | 6 | 29 | 22 | +7 |
| 3. | Boyacá Chicó | 32 | 18 | 10 | 2 | 6 | 22 | 15 | +7 |
| 4. | Atlético Huila | 31 | 18 | 9 | 4 | 5 | 25 | 17 | +8 |
| 5. | Atlético Nacional | 31 | 18 | 9 | 4 | 5 | 20 | 15 | +5 |
| 6. | Cúcuta Deportivo | 31 | 18 | 9 | 4 | 5 | 22 | 18 | +4 |
| 7. | Deportivo Pasto | 30 | 18 | 9 | 3 | 6 | 23 | 15 | +8 |
| 8. | Millonarios | 27 | 18 | 8 | 3 | 7 | 23 | 19 | +4 |
| 9. | Deportes Quindío | 27 | 18 | 8 | 3 | 7 | 24 | 25 | -1 |
| 10. | Deportivo Cali | 25 | 18 | 6 | 7 | 5 | 23 | 21 | +2 |
| 11. | Real Cartagena | 25 | 18 | 7 | 4 | 7 | 17 | 17 | - |
| 12. | Santa Fe | 24 | 18 | 6 | 6 | 6 | 34 | 30 | +4 |
| 13. | Deportivo Pereira | 22 | 18 | 6 | 4 | 8 | 23 | 24 | -1 |
| 14. | Atlético Junior | 20 | 18 | 5 | 5 | 8 | 19 | 29 | -10 |
| 15. | Once Caldas | 19 | 18 | 5 | 4 | 9 | 23 | 31 | -8 |
| 16. | Atlético Bucaramanga | 16 | 18 | 4 | 4 | 10 | 22 | 32 | -10 |
| 17. | América de Cali | 13 | 18 | 3 | 4 | 11 | 20 | 33 | -13 |
| 18. | Envigado Fútbol Club | 12 | 18 | 3 | 3 | 12 | 14 | 32 | -18 |

Pts=Points; GP=Games played; W=Wins; D=Ties; L=Losses; GS=Goals scored; GA=Goals allowed; DIF=Goal difference

| Qualified for second stage. |
| Disqualified |
| Relegated to Categoría Primera B |

=== Results ===
Fixture 1 - July 16, 2006
| Home | Score | Away |
|---|---|---|
| Millonarios | 1 - 1 | Huila |
| Pereira | 2 - 1 | Pasto |
| Cartagena | 1 - 2 | Quindío |
| Bucaramanga | 0 - 2 | Medellín |
| Deportivo Cali | 2 - 1 | América de Cali |
| Atlético Nacional | 2 - 1 | Cúcuta |
| Envigado | 1 - 3 | Junior |
| Boyacá Chicó | 3 - 0 | Once Caldas |
| Tolima | 2 - 0 | Santa Fe |

Fixture 2 - July 23, 2006
| Home | Score | Away |
|---|---|---|
| Huila | 3 - 2 | Tolima |
| Santa Fe | 1 - 1 | Boyacá Chicó |
| Once Caldas | 1 - 0 | Envigado |
| Junior | 2 - 1 | Atlético Nacional |
| Cúcuta | 1 - 1 | Deportivo Cali |
| América de Cali | 1 - 2 | Bucaramanga |
| Medellín | 1 - 0 | Cartagena |
| Quindío | 2 - 0 | Pereira |
| Pasto | 1 - 0 | Millonarios |

Fixture 3 - July 30, 2006
| Home | Score | Away |
|---|---|---|
| Huila | 1 - 0 | Pasto |
| Millonarios | 1 - 0 | Quindío |
| Pereira | 3 - 1 | Medellín |
| Cartagena | 2 - 1 | América de Cali |
| Bucaramanga | 0 - 1 | Cúcuta |
| Deportivo Cali | 0 - 0 | Junior |
| Atlético Nacional | 3 - 1 | Once Caldas |
| Envigado | 0 - 0 | Santa Fe |
| Boyacá Chicó | 0 - 1 | Tolima |

Fixture 4 - August 6, 2006
| Home | Score | Away |
|---|---|---|
| Boyacá Chicó | 1 - 0 | Huila |
| Tolima | 1 - 0 | Envigado |
| Santa Fe | 4 - 0 | Atlético Nacional |
| Once Caldas | 0 - 2 | Deportivo Cali |
| Junior | 2 - 2 | Bucaramanga |
| Cúcuta | 1 - 1 | Cartagena |
| América de Cali | 0 - 2 | Pereira |
| Medellín | 1 - 0 | Millonarios |
| Quindío | 2 - 1 | Pasto |

Fixture 5 - August 13, 2006
| Home | Score | Away |
|---|---|---|
| Huila | 4 - 1 | Quindío |
| Pasto | 3 - 0 | Medellín |
| Millonarios | 1 - 0 | América de Cali |
| Pereira | 0 - 1 | Cúcuta |
| Cartagena | 1 - 0 | Junior |
| Bucaramanga | 2 - 0 | Once Caldas |
| Deportivo Cali | 3 - 2 | Santa Fe |
| Nacional | 1 - 1 | Tolima |
| Envigado | 1 - 2 | Boyacá Chicó |

Fixture 6 - August 20, 2006
| Home | Score | Away |
|---|---|---|
| Envigado | 2 - 0 | Huila |
| Boyacá Chicó | 0 - 1 | Atlético Nacional |
| Tolima | 1 - 1 | Deportivo Cali |
| Santa Fe | 4 - 2 | Bucaramanga |
| Once Caldas | 1 - 1 | Cartagena |
| Junior | 1 - 1 | Pereira |
| Cúcuta | 2 - 1 | Millonarios |
| América de Cali | 1 - 1 | Pasto |
| Medellín | 2 - 0 | Quindío |

Fixture 7 - August 27, 2006
| Home | Score | Away |
|---|---|---|
| Huila | 1 - 1 | Medellín |
| Quindío | 2 - 2 | América de Cali |
| Pasto | 2 - 1 | Cúcuta |
| Millonarios | 3 - 1 | Junior |
| Pereira | 0 - 0 | Once Caldas |
| Cartagena | 1 - 0 | Santa Fe |
| Bucaramanga | 1 - 1 | Tolima |
| Deportivo Cali | 1 - 3 | Boyacá Chicó |
| Atlético Nacional | 0 - 0 | Envigado |

Fixture 8 - September 3, 2006
| Home | Score | Away |
|---|---|---|
| Atlético Nacional | 1 - 0 | Huila |
| Envigado | 0 - 3 | Deportivo Cali |
| Boyacá Chicó | 2 - 1 | Bucaramanga |
| Tolima | 4 - 1 | Cartagena |
| Santa Fe | 1 - 4 | Pereira |
| Once Caldas | 2 - 2 | Millonarios |
| Junior | 1 - 0 | Pasto |
| Cúcuta | 3 - 0 | Quindío |
| América de Cali | 3 - 2 | Medellín |

Fixture 9 - September 10, 2006
| Home | Score | Away |
|---|---|---|
| Pasto | 1 - 0 | Boyacá Chicó |
| Quindío | 1 - 0 | Envigado |
| Medellín | 0 - 1 | Atlético Nacional |
| América de Cali | 1 - 3 | Deportivo Cali |
| Cúcuta | 3 - 2 | Bucaramanga |
| Junior | 2 - 1 | Cartagena |
| Once Caldas | 1 - 0 | Pereira |
| Santa Fe | 3 - 2 | Millonarios |
| Tolima | 3 - 2 | Huila |

Fixture 10 - September 17, 2006
| Home | Score | Away |
|---|---|---|
| Huila | 2 - 0 | América de Cali |
| Medellín | 2 - 0 | Cúcuta |
| Quindío | 3 - 0 | Junior |
| Pasto | 2 - 1 | Once Caldas |
| Millonarios | 2 - 2 | Santa Fe |
| Pereira | 1 - 2 | Tolima |
| Cartagena | 1 - 1 | Boyacá Chicó |
| Bucaramanga | 3 - 1 | Envigado |
| Deportivo Cali | 1 - 1 | Atlético Nacional |

Fixture 11 - September 24, 2006
| Home | Score | Away |
|---|---|---|
| Deportivo Cali | 0 - 0 | Huila |
| Atlético Nacional | 3 - 0 | Bucaramanga |
| Evnigado | 1 - 0 | Cartagena |
| Boyacá Chicó | 3 - 0 | Pereira |
| Tolima | 1 - 0 | Millonarios |
| Santa Fe | 0 - 1 | Pasto |
| Once Caldas | 3 - 2 | Quindío |
| Junior | 2 - 2 | Medellín |
| Cúcuta | 2 - 0 | América de Cali |

Fixture 12 - October 1, 2006
| Home | Score | Away |
|---|---|---|
| Huila | 1 - 1 | Cúcuta |
| América de Cali | 1 - 0 | Junior |
| Medellín | 3 - 2 | Once Caldas |
| Quindío | 1 - 1 | Santa Fe |
| Pasto | 1 - 0 | Tolima |
| Millonarios | 2 - 1 | Boyacá Chicó |
| Pereira | 2 - 3 | Envigado |
| Cartagena | 0 - 1 | Atlético Nacional |
| Bucaramanga | 2 - 2 | Deportivo Cali |

Fixture 13 - October 8 de 2006
| Home | Score | Away |
|---|---|---|
| Bucaramanga | 1 - 0 | Huila |
| Deportivo Cali | 1 - 2 | Cartagena |
| Atlético Nacional | 2 - 0 | Pereira |
| Envigado | 0 - 1 | Millonarios |
| Boyacá Chicó | 1 - 0 | Pasto |
| Tolima | 2 - 0 | Quindío |
| Santa Fe | 3 - 2 | Medellín |
| Once Caldas | 4 - 1 | América |
| Junior | 0 - 1 | Cúcuta |

Fixture 14 - October 15, 2006
| Home | Score | Away |
|---|---|---|
| Huila | 3 - 0 | Junior |
| Cúcuta | 1 - 1 | Once Caldas |
| América de Cali | 2 - 2 | Santa Fe |
| Medellín | 4 - 1 | Tolima |
| Quindío | 3 - 1 | Boyacá Chicó |
| Pasto | 5 - 0 | Envigado |
| Millonarios | 2 - 0 | Atlético Nacional |
| Pereira | 2 - 0 | Deportivo Cali |
| Cartagena | 2 - 0 | Bucaramanga |

Fixture 15 - October 22, 2006
| Home | Score | Away |
|---|---|---|
| Cartagena | 0 - 1 | Huila |
| Bucaramanga | 3 - 3 | Pereira |
| Deportivo Cali | 0 - 1 | Millonarios |
| Atlético Nacional | 1 - 1 | Pasto |
| Envigado | 3 - 3 | Quindío |
| Boyacá Chicó | 1 - 0 | Medellín |
| Tolima | 2 - 2 | América de Cali |
| Santa Fe | 4 - 1 | Cúcuta |
| Once Caldas | 2 - 0 | Junior |

Fixture 16 - October 29, 2006
| Home | Score | Away |
|---|---|---|
| Huila | 3 - 2 | Once Caldas |
| Junior | 3 - 3 | Santa Fe |
| Cúcuta | 1 - 0 | Tolima |
| América de Cali | 0 - 1 | Boyacá Chicó |
| Medellín | 2 - 1 | Envigado |
| Quindío | 1 - 0 | Atlético Nacional |
| Pasto | 1 - 1 | Deportivo Cali |
| Millonarios | 2 - 0 | Bucaramanga |
| Pereira | 0 - 0 | Cartagena |

Fixture 17 - November 5, 2006
| Home | Score | Away |
|---|---|---|
| Pereira | 0 - 1 | Huila |
| Cartagena | 1 - 0 | Millonarios |
| Bucaramanga | 1 - 2 | Pasto |
| Deportivo Cali | 1 - 0 | Quindío |
| Atlético Nacional | 0 - 1 | Medellín |
| Envigado | 1 - 4 | América de Cali |
| Boyacá Chicó | 1 - 0 | Cúcuta |
| Tolima | 4 - 0 | Junior |
| Santa Fe | 3 - 1 | Once Caldas |

Fixture 18 - November 12, 2006
| Home | Score | Away |
|---|---|---|
| Huila | 2 - 1 | Santa Fe |
| Once Caldas | 1 - 3 | Tolima |
| Junior | 2 - 0 | Boyacá Chicó |
| Cúcuta | 1 - 0 | Envigado |
| América de Cali | 0 - 2 | Atlético Nacional |
| Quindío | 1 - 0 | Bucaramanga |
| Medellín | 3 - 1 | Deportivo Cali |
| Pasto | 0 - 2 | Real Cartagena |
| Millonarios | 2 - 3 | Pereira |

== Quadrangular/Semifinals ==
The second phase of the 2006-II Copa Mustang consisted of the quadrangular phase or semifinals. It was played between the best first eight teams from the tournament's standing, and then it was divided in two groups between odd and even numbers. The first team of each group were qualified directly to the finals, and then deciding a champion.

=== Group A ===
| R | Pos | Team | Pts | GP | W | D | L | GS | GA | Dif |
|---|---|---|---|---|---|---|---|---|---|---|
| (1) | 1. | Deportes Tolima | 12 | 6 | 4 | 0 | 2 | 10 | 5 | +5 |
| (5) | 2. | Atlético Nacional | 8 | 6 | 2 | 2 | 2 | 6 | 5 | +1 |
| (7) | 3. | Deportivo Pasto | 8 | 6 | 2 | 2 | 2 | 8 | 11 | -3 |
| (3) | 4. | Boyacá Chicó | 5 | 6 | 1 | 2 | 3 | 7 | 10 | -3 |

Fixture 1 - November 19, 2006
| Home | Score | Away |
|---|---|---|
| Atlético Nacional | 2 - 1 | Pasto |
| Boyacá Chicó | 2 - 0 | Tolima |

Fixture 2 - November 26, 2006
| Home | Score | Away |
|---|---|---|
| Pasto | 1 - 1 | Boyacá Chicó |
| Tolima | 1 - 0 | Atlético Nacional |

Fixture 3 - December 3, 2006
| Home | Score | Away |
|---|---|---|
| Pasto | 2 - 1 | Tolima |
| Atlético Nacional | 2 - 0 | Boyacá Chicó |

Fixture 4 - December 6, 2006
| Home | Score | Away |
|---|---|---|
| Tolima | 4 - 0 | Pasto |
| Boyacá Chicó | 1 - 1 | Atlético Nacional |

Fixture 5 - December 10, 2006
| Home | Score | Away |
|---|---|---|
| Boyacá Chicó | 3 - 4 | Pasto |
| Atlético Nacional | 1 - 2 | Tolima |

Fixture 6 - December 13, 2006
| Home | Score | Away |
|---|---|---|
| Pasto | 0 - 0 | Atlético Nacional |
| Tolima | 2 - 0 | Boyacá Chicó |

=== Group B ===
| R | Pos | Team | Pts | GP | W | D | L | GS | GA | Dif |
|---|---|---|---|---|---|---|---|---|---|---|
| (6) | 1. | Cúcuta Deportivo | 10 | 6 | 3 | 1 | 2 | 6 | 4 | +2 |
| (2) | 2. | Independiente Medellín | 9 | 6 | 3 | 0 | 3 | 12 | 7 | +5 |
| (8) | 3. | Millonarios | 9 | 6 | 3 | 0 | 3 | 6 | 10 | -4 |
| (4) | 4. | Atlético Huila | 7 | 6 | 2 | 1 | 3 | 7 | 10 | -3 |

Fixture 1 - November 19, 2006
| Home | Score | Away |
|---|---|---|
| Huila | 0 - 1 | Cúcuta |
| Millonarios | 1 - 0 | Medellín |

Fixture 2 - November 26, 2006
| Home | Score | Away |
|---|---|---|
| Cúcuta | 2 - 0 | Millonarios |
| Medellín | 3 - 0 | Huila |

Fixture 3 - December 3, 2006
| Home | Score | Away |
|---|---|---|
| Cúcuta | 2 - 1 | Medellín |
| Huila | 3 - 2 | Millonarios |

Fixture 4 - December 6, 2006
| Equipo Local | Resultado | Equipo Visitante |
|---|---|---|
| Medellín | 2 - 1 | Cúcuta |
| Millonarios | 2 - 1 | Huila |

Fixture 5 - December 10, 2006
| Equipo Local | Resultado | Equipo Visitante |
|---|---|---|
| Millonarios | 1 - 0 | Cúcuta |
| Huila | 3 - 2 | Medellín |

Fixture 6 - December 13, 2006
| Home | Score | Away |
|---|---|---|
| Cúcuta | 0 - 0 | Huila |
| Medellín | 4 - 0 | Millonarios |

== Final ==
| Date | City | Home | Score | Away |
|---|---|---|---|---|
| December 17 | Cúcuta | Cúcuta Deportivo | 1 - 0 | Deportes Tolima |
| December 20 | Ibagué | Deportes Tolima | 1 - 1 | Cúcuta Deportivo |
Cúcuta Deportivo is the new champion with an aggregate score of 2 - 1.

== Promotion Game ==
After the 2006 season of Fútbol Profesional Colombiano ended, Envigado FC was relegated directly to Categoría Primera B while Atlético Huila played the promotion game against Valledupar FC.

| Date | City | Home | Score | Away |
|---|---|---|---|---|
| November 22 | Valledupar | Valledupar FC | 0 - 1 | Atlético Huila |
| November 29 | Neiva | Atlético Huila | 2 - 0 | Valledupar FC |
Atlético Huila remains in Fútbol Profesional Colombiano since they won the promotion game with an aggregate score of 3–0.

== Relegated and Promoted Team(s) ==
| Categories | Relegated team(s) | Promoted team(s) |
|---|---|---|
| FPC; Primera B | Envigado FC | La Equidad |
