= Deportivo Pasto =

Colombian soccer club

Coordinates: 1°11′53″N 77°16′39″W

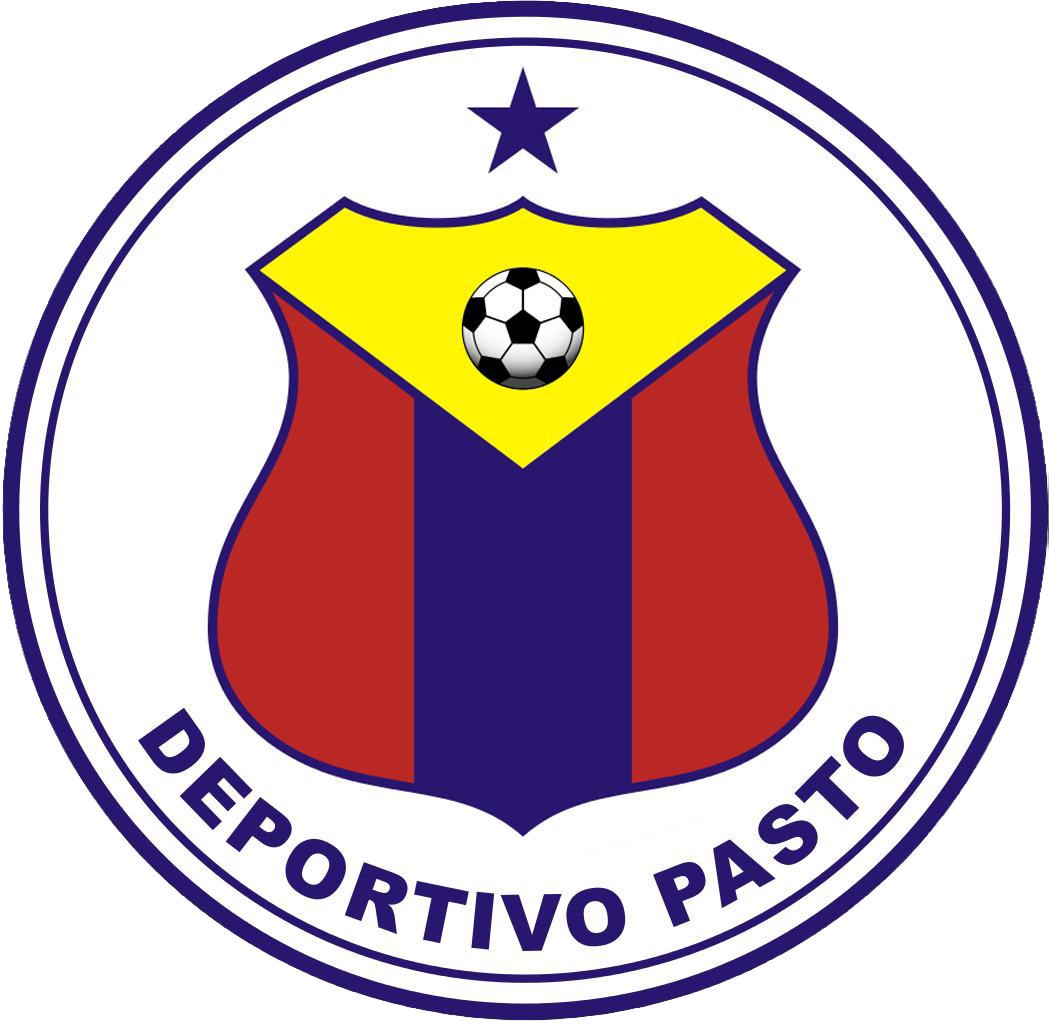
- Full name: Club Profesional Deportivo Pasto S.A.
- Nicknames: La Fuerza Tricolor (The Tricolor Force); Los Volcánicos (The Volcanics); Superdepor
- Founded: 12 October 1949; 77 years ago
- Ground: Departamental Libertad
- Capacity: 19,000
- President: Roberto Castro
- Head coach: Diego Merino
- League: Categoría Primera A
- 2025: Primera A, 13th of 20
- Website: deportivopastooficial.com
Home colours	Away colours	Third colours

Club Profesional Deportivo Pasto S.A., best known as Deportivo Pasto, is a Colombian professional football team based in the city of Pasto, that currently plays in the Categoría Primera A. They play their home games at the Estadio Departamental Libertad. Deportivo Pasto is both the southernmost and westernmost based team in the Colombian league.

Founded in 1949, Pasto has won the league title once, in the 2006 Apertura, and has finished as runner-up three times: in the 2002 Finalización, 2012 Apertura, and 2019 Apertura. The club has also finished runner-up twice in the Copa Colombia, in 2009 and 2012.

== History ==
The club was founded on 12 October 1949, and was a semi-pro team until 1996. That year, they were promoted to the professional second division, the Primera B, and achieved promotion into the Primera A in 1998. In their first top-flight season, the 1999 Apertura, Pasto finished twelfth in the league table. In the 1999 Finalización, Pasto finished in the top eight and qualified for the playoffs, where they finished last in the group with just one point.

In the 2006 Apertura, Pasto finished eighth in the table, the last seed to qualify for the playoffs. In the playoffs Pasto won their group and qualified for the finals, where they beat Deportivo Cali in the finals and won their first ever league title. In the 2006 Finalización, Pasto finished seventh and qualified for the playoffs again, but failed to make the finals. As league champions, Pasto earned a spot in the 2007 Copa Libertadores, their debut in the competition. Their first match was a 1–0 loss to Santos at home. However, the rest of the campaign was a complete failure, and the club had one of the worst campaigns in Libertadores history, being one of the only teams to lose all six group games, with only three goals in their favor.

In the 2009 Copa Colombia, the team reached the finals for the first time, where it lost to Independiente Santa Fe on penalties. Pasto was relegated to the Primera B that year as well, after finishing last in the relegation table (aggregate of last 3 seasons).

For the 2010 season, now in the Primera B, the club placed second in the table, advancing to the playoffs. In the playoffs, Pasto won its group and advanced to the playoff finals. In the finals, the club lost to Itagüí Ditaires, and missed out on direct promotion. However, the club still had a chance to be promoted with the relegation/promotion playoff, which would be played against the second-to-last club in the Primera A league table, Envigado. Envigado won 3–0 on aggregate, which meant Pasto would spend another season in the second division.

For the 2011 Apertura, coach Jorge Luis Bernal was replaced by Flabio Torres. The club began the season with a first-place league finish, with high expectations to win the title. In the playoffs, the club lost in the quarterfinals to Valledupar on penalties. For the 2011 Finalización, the team finished first in the league again. In the playoffs, it eliminated Uniautónoma with a 4–0 win and Expreso Rojo with a 5–1 win, making it to the finals against Centauros Villavicencio and winning to become the champion. To decide who would be directly promoted to the top flight, Pasto had to play Patriotas Boyacá, the Apertura champion. Pasto won the match on penalties, and earned direct promotion, while Patriotas had to play a promotion playoff. Pasto had one of the best Primera B campaigns ever, finishing with 91 points on the aggregate table, 24 points clear of the second placed team, Deportivo Rionegro.

The club had an excellent return to the Primera A, which was the 2012 season. In the Apertura, the club finished 6th and qualified to the playoffs, where it won its group, and qualified for the finals in an attempt to win their second league title, but lost to Santa Fe. For the 2012 Finalización, Pasto finished eighth in the league table, being the last team to advance to the playoffs. In the playoffs, the club narrowly missed out on the final, finishing second in the group to eventual champions Millonarios on goal difference. In 2012, Pasto also made the finals of the Copa Colombia, losing 2–0 to Atlético Nacional on aggregate.

In the 2019 Apertura, Pasto made the championship finals once again, but lost to Atlético Junior 5–4 on penalties.

== Honours ==
=== Domestic ===
- Categoría Primera A
  - Winners (1): 2006–I
- Categoría Primera B
  - Winners (2): 1998, 2011
- Copa Colombia
  - Runners-up (2): 2009, 2012

== Performance in CONMEBOL competitions ==
Season	Competition	Round	Opponent	Home	Away
2003	Copa Sudamericana	PR	(Colombia) Atlético Nacional	0–0	1–2
2007	Copa Libertadores	GS	(Brazil) Santos	0–1	0–3
2007	Copa Libertadores	GS	(Argentina) Gimnasia y Esgrima	0–2	2–3
2007	Copa Libertadores	GS	(Uruguay) Defensor Sporting	1–2	0–3
2013	Copa Sudamericana				
2013	Copa Sudamericana	FS	(Peru) Melgar	3–0	0–2
2013	Copa Sudamericana	SS	(Chile) Colo-Colo	1–0	2–0
2013	Copa Sudamericana	R16	(Brazil) Ponte Preta	1–0	0–2
2020	Copa Sudamericana	FS	(Chile) Huachipato	0–1	0–1

Notes

- FS: First stage
- GS: Group stage
- PR: Preliminary round
- R16: Round of 16
- SS: Second stage

== Stadium ==
- Name – Estadio Libertad
- City – Pasto
- Capacity – 25,000
- Inauguration – 1954
- Pitch size – 120 x 90 m

== Players ==
=== Current squad ===
As of 15 September 2026

Note: Flags indicate national team as defined under FIFA eligibility rules; some limited exceptions apply. Players may hold more than one non-FIFA nationality.

No.	Pos.	Nation	Player
1	GK	COL	Ederson Cabezas
2	DF	COL	Fainer Torijano (captain)
3	DF	COL	Joyce Ossa
4	DF	ESP	Derik Osede
5	DF	COL	Nicolás Gil
6	DF	COL	Santiago Jiménez
7	MF	COL	Jonathan Perlaza
8	MF	COL	Enrique Serje
9	FW	COL	Jorge Obregón
10	MF	ARG	Diego Chávez
11	FW	COL	Andrés Ibargüen
12	GK	COL	Geovanni Banguera
15	MF	COL	Harrinson Mancilla
16	FW	ESA	Mayer Gil (on loan from Alianza Valledupar)
17	MF	COL	John Méndez
18	FW	COL	Joider Micolta (on loan from América de Cali)
19	FW	COL	Patrick Preciado

No.	Pos.	Nation	Player
22	MF	COL	Yeison Tolosa
23	MF	COL	Yéiler Góez
24	GK	COL	Luis Marquínez
25	MF	ARG	Franco Leys
26	DF	COL	Heiler Moreno
27	DF	COL	Hervin Goyes
29	FW	COL	Santiago Córdoba
30	MF	COL	David Guerrero
31	FW	COL	Luther Rueda
32	MF	ARG	Matías Pisano
33	DF	COL	Mateo Garavito
35	MF	COL	Frank Martínez
36	DF	COL	Julián Quiñones
—	DF	COL	Ramiro Morales
—	MF	COL	Gian Cabezas
—	MF	COL	Willian Ordóñez

=== Out on loan ===
Note: Flags indicate national team as defined under FIFA eligibility rules; some limited exceptions apply. Players may hold more than one non-FIFA nationality.

No.	Pos.	Nation	Player
—	DF	COL	Fabián Villa (at Atlético Cali)
—	MF	COL	Jeirye Caicedo (at Deportivo Lara)

No.	Pos.	Nation	Player
—	MF	COL	Johan Caicedo (at Atlético San Luis)
—	FW	COL	Jaider Victoria (at Godoy Cruz)

== Notable players ==
- (Colombia) Carlos Daniel Hidalgo (2002–2004), (2006–2007), (2009), (2010–2012), (2016), (2019–2023)
- (Colombia) Luis Lora (2004–2014)
- (Colombia) René Rosero (2004–2015)
- (Colombia) Nelson Ramos (2005–2009)
- (Colombia) Walden Vargas (2005–2010)
- (Paraguay) Carlos Villagra (2006),(2011)
- (Uruguay) Juan Guillermo Castillo (2014)
- (Colombia) Camilo Ayala (2019–2024)

== Managers ==
- (Colombia) Carlos Valencia (1996–1997)
- (Colombia) Félix Valverde (1998–1999)
- (Colombia) Jairo Enríquez (2000)
- (Colombia) Carlos Restrepo (2000)
- (Colombia) Félix Valverde (May 2000 – December 2000)
- (Colombia) Jairo Enríquez (January 2001 – June 2001)
- (Colombia) Hugo Castaño (June 2001 – February 2002)
- (Colombia) Néstor Otero (March 2002 – September 2003)
- (Colombia) Miguel Augusto Prince (September 2003 – December 2003)
- (Colombia) Carlos Navarrete Zuleta (2004)
- (Colombia) Jairo Enríquez (2004)
- (Colombia) Néstor Otero (2005)
- (Argentina) Óscar Quintabani (2006)
- (Colombia) Santiago Escobar (2006)
- (Colombia) Álvaro de Jesús Gómez (2007)
- (Colombia) Carlos Rendón (2007)
- (Colombia) Miguel Augusto Prince (2007)
- (Colombia) Jorge Bermúdez (January 2008 – September 2008)
- (Colombia) Bernardo Redín (September 2008 – March 2009)
- (Colombia) Jorge Luis Bernal (March 2009 – December 2009)
- (Colombia) Hernán Herrera (January 2010 – June 2010)
- (Colombia) Jorge Luis Bernal (July 2010 – December 2010)
- (Colombia) Flabio Torres (January 2011 – December 2013)
- (Colombia) Jorge Luis Bernal (December 2013 – May 2014)
- (Colombia) Wilson Gutiérrez (May 2014 – November 2014)
- (Argentina) Óscar Quintabani (January 2015 – March 2015)
- (Colombia) Giovanny Ruiz (March 2015 – April 2015)
- (Colombia) Guillermo Berrío (April 2015 – June 2016)
- (Colombia) José Fernando Santa (September 2016 – December 2016)
- (Colombia) Flabio Torres (January 2017 – August 2018)
- (Argentina) Hernán Lisi (August 2018 – December 2018)
- (Colombia) Alexis García (January 2019 – September 2019)
- (Colombia) Jairo Enríquez (interim, September 2019 – October 2019)
- (Ecuador) Octavio Zambrano (October 2019 – December 2019)
- (Colombia) Diego Corredor (January 2020 – April 2021)
- (Colombia) Giovanny Ruiz (April 2021 – August 2021)
- (Colombia) Flabio Torres (August 2021 – November 2023)
- (Colombia) Jersson González (November 2023 – February 2024)
- (Colombia) René Rosero (interim, March 2024 – April 2024)
- (Paraguay) Gustavo Florentín (April 2024 – December 2024)
- (Colombia) Camilo Ayala (January 2025 – September 2025)
- (Colombia) René Rosero (interim, September 2025 – November 2025)
- (Spain) Jonathan Risueño (December 2025 – August 2026)
- (Colombia) René Rosero (August 2026 – October 2026)
- (Spain) Diego Merino (October 2026 – Present)

Source: Worldfootball.net
