= Diego Raimondi =

Argentine footballer (born 1977)

Personal information
- Full name: Diego Gabriel Raimondi
- Date of birth: 27 December 1977 (age 48)
- Place of birth: Buenos Aires, Argentina
- Height: 1.85 m (6 ft 1 in)
- Position: Defender

Senior career*
Years	Team	Apps	(Gls)
1999–2000	Atlanta	27	(1)
2001–2003	Casarano	42	(1)
2003–2006	Gallipoli	81	(1)
2006–2009	Pisa	73	(4)
2009–2010	Perugia	31	(2)
2010–2011	Cosenza	17	(0)
2011–2012	Pisa	28	(0)
2012	Pontedera	5	(0)

Managerial career
- 2015–2016: Sestri Levante
- 2023: Rimini
- 2025: América de Cali
- * Club domestic league appearances and goals

Diego Gabriel Raimondi (born 27 December 1977) is an Argentine football coach and a former player.

== Career ==
Raimondi moved to Italy in 2001–02, joining Serie D club Casarano after two seasons in Argentina with Club Atlético Atlanta. He signed for Eccellenza side Gallipoli in 2003 and helped his side to win two consecutive promotions. In 2006, he joined Pisa of Serie C1, where he obtained a personal third consecutive promotion, this time to Serie B. He was the former Pisa captain. After the bankruptcy of Pisa, he joined Perugia. As Perugia was excluded from professional football in 2010, Raimondi found himself again without a contract and successively signed for another third-division club, Cosenza. This experience lasted only a few months, as Raimondi agreed to a comeback at Pisa in January 2011.

== Coaching career ==
After 5 games for Pontedera, Raimondi moved back to Chile and became the assistant manager under Christian Díaz at Deportes Iquique. He left alongside manager Díaz in March 2013.

On 25 June 2015, it was confirmed that Raimondi had been appointed as the manager of Sestri Levante. He was in charge of the team the whole season before he became a part of the new manager Siniša Mihajlović' technical staff at Torino in the summer 2016. He was going to function as a technical collaborator. In the beginning of January 2018, Siniša Mihajlović was fired but however, Raimondi stayed at the club and continued under new manager Walter Mazzarri.

On 29 January 2019, Siniša Mihajlović became the manager of Bologna and once again brought Raimondi with him as a part of his staff. He was going to function as a technical collaborator again.

Following Diego Alonso's appointment as new Uruguay head coach, Raimondi was named as one of his two assistants in charge of the Celeste. He officially left Bologna on 2 January 2022.

On 18 July 2023, Raimondi was hired as head coach of Italian Serie C club Rimini. He mutually rescinded his contract on 10 October 2023 following a negative start of the season.

On 25 June 2025, Raimondi was appointed as head coach of Colombian Primera A club América de Cali. He left the club by mutual agreement on 1 September, due to América's poor league performance as well as elimination from the 2025 Copa Sudamericana.
