= SCD Independiente =

Spanish association football club

Independiente Camp Redó
- Full name: Sociedad Cultural y Deportiva Independiente Camp Redó
- Nickname: Inde
- Founded: 1965
- Ground: La Antoniana
- Capacity: 300
- Chairman: Francesc Moranta Bauzà
- Manager: Diego Enri Bernabeu
- League: Primera Regional – Mallorca – Group B
- 2024–25: Preferente Regional – Mallorca, 18th of 18 (relegated)
Home colours	Away colours

The Sociedad Cultural y Deportiva Independiente Camp Redó, known as Independiente Camp Redó, is a football club from Palma (Balearic Islands, Spain). It is located in Camp Redó neighborhood of the city, was founded in 1965 and is one of the oldest clubs in the capital. The team plays in Primera Regional – Mallorca – Group B.

== History ==
The origins go back to the founding of Club Deportivo Nidda in 1965. Initially, the club adopted the name of its social premises: the Bar Nidda, located in the same neighborhood. In 1967 the club was re-established and adopted the current name.

Since its inception, the club played in regional categories in Mallorca and gradually moved up one category. The first years played alternately in Primera Regional (for not descending) or Segunda Regional. In the mid-1990s it took a qualitative leap and reached the Regional Preferente, also as a lift team between it and Primera Regional.

At the beginning of XXI century the club lived its best years. In 2008–09 season played the qualifying rounds for promotion to Tercera División and achieved promotion. But his journey in Tercera División (2009–10 season) was not good, and decreased that same season and returned to be a regular player in Regional Preferente. It drop to Primera regional for the 2015–16 season, largely due to the poor condition of its stadium. After a year promoted to Regional Preferente, where it was during two seasons and was relegated again to Primera Regional, where plays actually.

== Stadium ==
La Antoniana was inaugurated on 1 January 1935, with a capacity of 300 seats. The surface of the playing field is artificial grass and has a size of 98 x 65 meters. The team has played the matches since its inception.

This is the oldest football field in the city (inaugurated in 1935). For some years it was the only ground stadium in the city (and in poor condition), which influenced results of team and its lower categories.

After years of waiting, in May 2017 the renovation works for the installation of artificial grass were carried out. On 19 June of the same year the new facilities were inaugurated.

== Season to season ==
Season	Tier	Division	Place	Copa del Rey
1966–67	5	2ª Reg.	8th	
1967–68	5	2ª Reg.	5th	
1968–69	4	1ª Reg.	14th	
1969–70	4	1ª Reg.	4th	
1970–71	4	1ª Reg.	10th	
1971–72	4	1ª Reg.	14th	
1972–73	5	1ª Reg.	16th	
1973–74	6	2ª Reg.	13th	
1974–75	6	2ª Reg.	9th	
1975–76	6	2ª Reg.	14th	
1976–77	6	2ª Reg.	7th	
1977–78	7	2ª Reg.	3rd	
1978–79	6	1ª Reg.	12th	
1979–80	6	1ª Reg.	12th	
1980–81	6	1ª Reg.	14th	
1981–82	6	1ª Reg.	14th	
1982–83	6	1ª Reg.	9th	
1983–84	6	1ª Reg.	8th	
1984–85	6	1ª Reg.	3rd	
1985–86	5	Reg. Pref.	18th	

Season	Tier	Division	Place	Copa del Rey
1986–87	6	1ª Reg.	14th	
1987–88	6	1ª Reg.	11th	
1988–89	6	1ª Reg.	7th	
1989–90	6	1ª Reg.	11th	
1990–91	6	1ª Reg.	8th	
1991–92	6	1ª Reg.	5th	
1992–93	6	1ª Reg.	7th	
1993–94	6	1ª Reg.	3rd	
1994–95	5	Reg. Pref.	16th	
1995–96	5	Reg. Pref.	20th	
1996–97	6	1ª Reg.	11th	
1997–98	6	1ª Reg.	2nd	
1998–99	5	Reg. Pref.	17th	
1999–2000	5	Reg. Pref.	19th	
2000–01	6	1ª Reg.	11th	
2001–02	6	1ª Reg.	2nd	
2002–03	5	Reg. Pref.	14th	
2003–04	5	Reg. Pref.	16th	
2004–05	5	Reg. Pref.	20th	
2005–06	6	1ª Reg.	13th	

Season	Tier	Division	Place	Copa del Rey
2006–07	6	1ª Reg.	1st	
2007–08	5	Reg. Pref.	11th	
2008–09	5	Reg. Pref.	4th	
2009–10	4	3ª	18th	
2010–11	5	Reg. Pref.	8th	
2011–12	5	Reg. Pref.	12th	
2012–13	5	Reg. Pref.	5th	
2013–14	5	Reg. Pref.	5th	
2014–15	5	Reg. Pref.	19th	
2015–16	6	1ª Reg.	1st	
2016–17	5	Reg. Pref.	18th	
2017–18	5	Reg. Pref.	18th	
2018–19	6	1ª Reg.	6th	
2019–20	6	1ª Reg.	6th	
2020–21	6	1ª Reg.	7th	
2021–22	7	1ª Reg.	7th	
2022–23	6	Reg. Pref.	12th	
2023–24	6	Reg. Pref.	15th	
2024–25	7	Pref. Reg.	18th	
2025–26	8	1ª Reg.		

- 1 season in Tercera División

== Honours ==
- Primera Regional
  - Winners (2): 2006–07, 2015–16
  - Runners-up (2): 1997–98, 2001–02

== Women's team ==
The club has a women's section. This was set up in 1999–2000 season and has since competed without interruption, becoming one of the oldest clubs in competition in Balearic Islands.
