= Juan Mahecha =

Colombian footballer (born 1987)

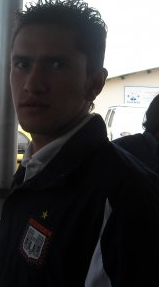

Personal information
- Full name: Juan Alejandro Mahecha Molina
- Date of birth: 22 July 1987 (age 39)
- Place of birth: Tunja, Colombia
- Height: 1.76 m (5 ft 9 in)
- Position: Defensive midfielder

Team information
- Current team: La Equidad (assistant manager)

Senior career*
Years	Team	Apps	(Gls)
2005–2009	Boyacá Chicó	133	(5)
2009–2010	Belgrano	36	(4)
2011–2014	Boyacá Chicó	112	(15)
2014–2015	Deportes Tolima	29	(0)
2015–2016	Boyacá Chicó	42	(3)
2017–2024	La Equidad	222	(7)

International career
2006–2007	Colombia U20	6	(0)

Managerial career
- 2025–: La Equidad (assistant)
- 2025: La Equidad (interim)
- 2025: La Equidad (interim)
- * Club domestic league appearances and goals

Juan Alejandro Mahecha Molina (born 22 July 1987) is a former Colombian football manager and former player who played mainly as a defensive midfielder. He is a current assistant manager of La Equidad.

Mahecha was a starter on the 2007 Colombia national under-20 football team that failed to qualify for the 2007 World Cup.

== Honours ==
Boyacá Chicó

- Categoría Primera A (1): 2008-I

Deportes Tolima

- Copa Colombia (1): 2014
