= 2025 Copa Colombia =

Copa BetPlay Dimayor 2025

Tournament details
- Country: Colombia
- Dates: 28 May – 17 December 2025
- Teams: 36

Final positions
- Champions: Atlético Nacional (8th title)
- Runners-up: Independiente Medellín
- Copa Sudamericana: Atlético Nacional

Tournament statistics
- Matches played: 86
- Goals scored: 208 (2.42 per match)
- Top goal scorer(s): Jayder Asprilla; Francisco Fydriszewski (5 goals each)

The 2025 Copa Colombia, officially the Copa BetPlay Dimayor 2025 for sponsorship reasons, was the 23rd edition of the Copa Colombia, the national cup competition for clubs affiliated to Dimayor, the governing body of professional club football in Colombia. The tournament, which was contested by the 36 Dimayor member clubs, began on 28 May and ended on 17 December 2025.

The defending champions Atlético Nacional won their eighth Copa Colombia title in this tournament, and third in a row, after defeating Independiente Medellín 1–0 on aggregate in the finals. By winning the competition, Atlético Nacional qualified for the 2026 Copa Sudamericana.

== Format ==
For this edition, the competition had a change in its format to allow the teams that failed to advance to the final stages of Dimayor's league tournaments to maintain competitive pace and reduce their mid-season downtime. The first stage of the competition was split into Stage 1A and Stage 1B, with Stage 1A featuring the 12 Categoría Primera A and the 8 Categoría Primera B teams that did not advance to the semi-finals of their league tournament, which were distributed into four groups of five teams (three Primera A teams and the remaining two from Primera B) according to their position in the first stage of the league. In each group, teams had one bye day and played two matches at home and two away, with the top two advancing to the round of 16. Subsequently, Stage 1B was contested by the 16 teams that advanced to the semi-finals of the Primera A and Primera B tournaments, which were allocated into eight ties according to their position in the first stage of the league, with the eight winners advancing to the round of 16. The round of 16 was played by the eight teams advancing from Stage 1A and the eight Stage 1B winners, in which the teams coming from Stage 1A played the Stage 1B winners in eight two-legged ties. The winners advanced to the subsequent knockout stages of the competition (quarter-finals, semi-finals, and finals). Unlike the previous editions, no draws were performed for any phase of the competition.

== Schedule ==
The schedule of the competition was as follows:

Round		First leg	Second leg
First stage	Stage 1A	Matchday 1: 28–30 May 2025; Matchday 2: 1–4 June 2025; Matchday 3: 5–8 June 2025; Matchday 4: 9–12 June 2025; Matchday 5: 13–16 June 2025	
First stage	Stage 1B	29–31 July 2025	5–26 August 2025
Round of 16		26 August – 3 September 2025	2 September – 1 October 2025
Quarter-finals		24 September – 9 October 2025	1–22 October 2025
Semi-finals		2–3 November 2025	10–16 November 2025
Finals		13 December 2025	17 December 2025

== First stage ==
For this season, the first stage was split into two phases in which the 36 participating clubs were allocated according to their position in the first stage of their respective leagues.

=== Stage 1A ===
Stage 1A was contested by the 20 clubs that failed to advance to the semi-final stages of the Apertura tournaments of the 2025 Primera A and 2025 Primera B: 12 Primera A clubs and 8 Primera B ones.

==== Group A ====
Pos	Team	Pld	W	D	L	GF	GA	GD	Pts	Qualification	BUC	QUI	BOY	BOC	CAL
1	Atlético Bucaramanga	4	3	1	0	9	5	+4	10	Advance to the round of 16	—	—	3–2	—	3–1
2	Deportes Quindío	4	2	1	1	6	5	+1	7	Advance to the round of 16	2–2	—	2–1	—	—
3	Boyacá Chicó	4	2	0	2	5	5	0	6		—	—	—	1–0	1–0
4	Boca Juniors de Cali	4	1	0	3	3	4	−1	3		0–1	2–0	—	—	—
5	Deportivo Cali	4	1	0	3	3	7	−4	3		—	0–2	—	2–1	—

Source: Dimayor, Soccerway
Legend: Blue = home team win; Yellow = draw; Red = away team win.
Rules for classification: 1) Points, 2) Goal difference, 3) Goals for, 4) Away goals for, 5) Away goals against, 6) Drawing of lots.

==== Group B ====
Pos	Team	Pld	W	D	L	GF	GA	GD	Pts	Qualification	ENV	ALI	AGU	BAR	ORS
1	Envigado	4	3	1	0	8	4	+4	10	Advance to the round of 16	—	—	2–0	2–1	—
2	Alianza	4	2	2	0	10	5	+5	8	Advance to the round of 16	3–3	—	4–0	—	—
3	Águilas Doradas	4	2	0	2	3	7	−4	6		—	—	—	1–0	2–1
4	Barranquilla	4	1	0	3	3	4	−1	3		—	0–1	—	—	2–0
5	Orsomarso	4	0	1	3	3	7	−4	1		0–1	2–2	—	—	—

Source: Dimayor, Soccerway
Legend: Blue = home team win; Yellow = draw; Red = away team win.
Rules for classification: 1) Points, 2) Goal difference, 3) Goals for, 4) Away goals for, 5) Away goals against, 6) Drawing of lots.

==== Group C ====
Pos	Team	Pld	W	D	L	GF	GA	GD	Pts	Qualification	ATL	PAS	MAG	LLA	RSA
1	Atlético	4	2	2	0	5	3	+2	8	Advance to the round of 16	—	1–0	—	—	3–2
2	Deportivo Pasto	4	2	1	1	7	3	+4	7	Advance to the round of 16	—	—	3–1	3–0	—
3	Unión Magdalena	4	1	2	1	3	3	0	5		0–0	—	—	0–0	—
4	Llaneros	4	1	2	1	3	5	−2	5		1–1	—	—	—	2–1
5	Real Santander	4	0	1	3	4	8	−4	1		—	1–1	0–2	—	—

Source: Dimayor, Soccerway
Legend: Blue = home team win; Yellow = draw; Red = away team win.
Rules for classification: 1) Points, 2) Goal difference, 3) Goals for, 4) Away goals for, 5) Away goals against, 6) Drawing of lots.

==== Group D ====
Pos	Team	Pld	W	D	L	GF	GA	GD	Pts	Qualification	PER	FOR	BOG	LEO	EQU
1	Deportivo Pereira	4	2	2	0	7	2	+5	8	Advance to the round of 16	—	0–0	—	—	2–0
2	Fortaleza	4	2	2	0	5	1	+4	8	Advance to the round of 16	—	—	2–0	1–1	—
3	Bogotá	4	1	1	2	2	6	−4	4		0–3	—	—	0–0	—
4	Itagüí Leones	4	0	3	1	4	5	−1	3		2–2	—	—	—	1–2
5	La Equidad	4	1	0	3	3	7	−4	3		—	0–2	1–2	—	—

Source: Dimayor, Soccerway
Legend: Blue = home team win; Yellow = draw; Red = away team win.
Rules for classification: 1) Points, 2) Goal difference, 3) Goals for, 4) Away goals for, 5) Away goals against, 6) Drawing of lots.

=== Stage 1B ===
Stage 1B was contested by the eight Categoría Primera A and the eight Categoría Primera B clubs that advanced to the semi-finals in their respective leagues.

Team 1	Agg.	Team 2	1st leg	2nd leg
Independiente Medellín	2–1	Jaguares	1–1	1–0
Santa Fe	2–0	Internacional	2–0	0–0
Deportes Tolima	1–3	Real Cundinamarca	1–2	0–1
Millonarios	4–3	Real Cartagena	3–1	1–2
América de Cali	6–0	Tigres	5–0	1–0
Junior	3–3 (4–2 p)	Atlético Huila	2–2	1–1
Atlético Nacional	4–0	Cúcuta Deportivo	1–0	3–0
Once Caldas	6–1	Patriotas	6–0	0–1

==== First leg ====
29 July 2025	Santa Fe	2–0	Internacional	Bogotá
18:00 UTC−5	Rodríguez 28'; S. Mosquera 33'	Report		Stadium: El Campín; Referee: Héctor Rivera

29 July 2025	Atlético Nacional	1–0	Cúcuta Deportivo	Medellín
18:00 UTC−5	Zapata 6'	Report		Stadium: Atanasio Girardot; Referee: Ferney Trujillo

29 July 2025	Deportes Tolima	1–2	Real Cundinamarca	Ibagué
19:30 UTC−5	Lencina 87'	Report	Asprilla 34', 53'	Stadium: Manuel Murillo Toro; Referee: Yair Cárdenas

29 July 2025	Junior	2–2	Atlético Huila	Barranquilla
19:30 UTC−5	Enamorado 8'; Gutiérrez 67'	Report	Lora 37', 59'	Stadium: Metropolitano Roberto Meléndez; Referee: Esnaider Pontón

29 July 2025	América de Cali	5–0	Tigres	Cali
20:20 UTC−5	Mosquera 4'; Garcés 17', 90'; González 48'; Mina 83'	Report		Stadium: Pascual Guerrero; Referee: Sebastián Toro

30 July 2025	Once Caldas	6–0	Patriotas	Manizales
19:30 UTC−5	Zapata 20'; K. Cuesta 45+2'; Moreno 49' (pen.), 87'; Zuleta 82'; Castaño 90+1'	Report		Stadium: Palogrande; Referee: Álvaro Meléndez

31 July 2025	Independiente Medellín	1–1	Jaguares	Medellín
18:00 UTC−5	Fydriszewski 53'	Report	Padilla 59'	Stadium: Atanasio Girardot; Referee: Wilmar Montaño

31 July 2025	Millonarios	3–1	Real Cartagena	Bogotá
20:10 UTC−5	Marimón 39'; B. Castro 45+3', 55'	Report	Acosta 90+1'	Stadium: El Campín; Referee: Luis Delgado

==== Second leg ====
5 August 2025	Cúcuta Deportivo	0–3 (0–4 agg.)	Atlético Nacional	Cúcuta
16:00 UTC−5		Report	Cardona 27' (pen.); Sarmiento 62'; Morelos 71'	Stadium: General Santander; Referee: Jhon Ospina

5 August 2025	Internacional	0–0 (0–2 agg.)	Santa Fe	Palmira
20:00 UTC−5		Report		Stadium: Francisco Rivera Escobar; Referee: Mauricio Mercado

6 August 2025	Tigres	0–1 (0–6 agg.)	América de Cali	Yumbo
17:00 UTC−5		Report	Candelo 81'	Stadium: Municipal Raúl Miranda; Referee: David Espinosa
Note: Match originally scheduled for 5 August 2025, 20:00 local time at Estadio Metropolitano de Techo in Bogotá but rescheduled due to documentation issues.

6 August 2025	Atlético Huila	1–1 (3–3 agg.) (2–4 p)	Junior	Neiva
19:30 UTC−5	Castro 87'	Report	Castrillón 45'	Stadium: Guillermo Plazas Alcid; Referee: Steven Camargo
	Penalties
	Duarte (penalty scored); Castro (penalty missed); García (penalty scored); Villa (penalty missed)		(penalty scored) Báez; (penalty missed) Chará; (penalty scored) Rodríguez; (penalty scored) Enamorado; (penalty scored) Gutiérrez

7 August 2025	Jaguares	0–1 (1–2 agg.)	Independiente Medellín	Montería
18:00 UTC−5		Report	León 29'	Stadium: Jaraguay; Referee: Diego Ulloa

13 August 2025	Real Cundinamarca	1–0 (3–1 agg.)	Deportes Tolima	Bogotá
19:00 UTC−5	Asprilla 90+5'	Report		Stadium: Metropolitano de Techo; Referee: Lizmair Suárez

22 August 2025	Patriotas	1–0 (1–6 agg.)	Once Caldas	Tunja
16:00 UTC−5	Rivadeneira 88'	Report		Stadium: La Independencia; Referee: Alejandro Moncada
Note: Match originally scheduled for 6 August 2025, 18:00 local time but postponed to 22 August due to a miners' strike in the Boyacá Department.

26 August 2025	Real Cartagena	2–1 (3–4 agg.)	Millonarios	Cartagena
20:10 UTC−5	Murillo 55' (pen.); Pedrosa 76'	Report	Banguero 89' (pen.)	Stadium: Jaime Morón León; Referee: David Espinosa

== Final stages ==
Each round in the final stages was played under a home-and-away two-legged format. The second leg in all rounds was hosted by the team better placed in the league's aggregate table at the end of the Apertura tournament if both teams played in the same tier, or by the Primera B team if both teams played in different tiers. In case of a draw on aggregate score at the end of the second leg, extra time was not played and the winner would be decided in a penalty shoot-out.

=== Bracket ===
Round of 16
Deportivo Pasto	1	0	1
Once Caldas	2	4	6
Atlético Nacional	4	2	6
Deportes Quindío	0	2	2
Junior (p)	2	0	2 (4)
Atlético	0	2	2 (1)
Atlético Bucaramanga	1	0	1
América de Cali	0	2	2
Envigado	1	0	1
Millonarios	0	0	0
Deportivo Pereira (p)	4	1	5 (4)
Real Cundinamarca	3	2	5 (3)
Fortaleza	0	1	1
Independiente Medellín	0	2	2
Alianza	1	1	2
Santa Fe	1	4	5

Quarter-finals
Once Caldas	0	0	0
Atlético Nacional	1	2	3
Junior	1	1	2 (7)
América de Cali (p)	2	0	2 (8)
Envigado (p)	2	0	2 (2)
Deportivo Pereira	1	1	2 (1)
Independiente Medellín	1	3	4
Santa Fe	2	0	2

Semi-finals
Atlético Nacional	4	2	6
América de Cali	1	2	3
Envigado	0	1	1
Independiente Medellín	1	1	2

Finals
Atlético Nacional	0	1	1
Independiente Medellín	0	0	0

=== Round of 16 ===
Team 1	Agg.	Team 2	1st leg	2nd leg
Fortaleza	1–2	Independiente Medellín	0–0	1–2
Alianza	2–5	Santa Fe	1–1	1–4
Deportivo Pereira	5–5 (4–3 p)	Real Cundinamarca	4–3	1–2
Envigado	1–0	Millonarios	1–0	0–0
Atlético Bucaramanga	1–2	América de Cali	1–0	0–2
Junior	2–2 (4–1 p)	Atlético	2–0	0–2
Atlético Nacional	6–2	Deportes Quindío	4–0	2–2
Deportivo Pasto	1–6	Once Caldas	1–2	0–4

==== First leg ====
26 August 2025	Junior	2–0	Atlético	Barranquilla
18:30 UTC−5	Báez 51', 90+6'	Report		Stadium: Metropolitano Roberto Meléndez; Referee: Mauricio Mercado

26 August 2025	Deportivo Pereira	4–3	Real Cundinamarca	Pereira
19:00 UTC−5	Merheg 30', 90+5'; J. Quintero 37'; D. Quintero 78'	Report	Rocha 8'; Hoyos 18'; Asprilla 70' (pen.)	Stadium: Hernán Ramírez Villegas; Referee: Carlos Betancur

27 August 2025	Fortaleza	0–0	Independiente Medellín	Bogotá
15:00 UTC−5		Report		Stadium: Metropolitano de Techo; Referee: Héctor Rivera

27 August 2025	Atlético Bucaramanga	1–0	América de Cali	Bucaramanga
18:30 UTC−5	Pons 16'	Report		Stadium: Américo Montanini; Referee: Jairo Mayorga

27 August 2025	Atlético Nacional	4–0	Deportes Quindío	Medellín
20:30 UTC−5	Morelos 10'; Román 45+2'; Rengifo 84'; Rivero 90+4'	Report		Stadium: Atanasio Girardot; Referee: Wilmar Montaño

28 August 2025	Alianza	1–1	Santa Fe	Valledupar
16:00 UTC−5	Aponzá 90'	Report	S. Mosquera 43'	Stadium: Armando Maestre Pavajeau; Referee: Jonnathan Ortiz

28 August 2025	Deportivo Pasto	1–2	Once Caldas	Pasto
19:30 UTC−5	Cardona 90+5' (o.g.)	Report	Cardona 44'; Gómez 82'	Stadium: Departamental Libertad; Referee: Steven Camargo
Note: Match originally scheduled for 27 August 2025, 19:30 local time but pushed back for a day as the away team was unable to land in Pasto the day prior to the match.

3 September 2025	Envigado	1–0	Millonarios	Envigado
15:00 UTC−5	Soto 14'	Report		Stadium: Polideportivo Sur; Referee: Mauricio Mercado

==== Second leg ====
2 September 2025	Real Cundinamarca	2–1 (5–5 agg.) (3–4 p)	Deportivo Pereira	Bogotá
19:00 UTC−5	Asprilla 40' (pen.); Rocha 82'	Report	Quiñones 67'	Stadium: Metropolitano de Techo; Referee: Diego Ulloa
	Penalties
	Asprilla (penalty scored); Viveros (penalty scored); Rubiano (penalty missed); Rocha (penalty scored); Dávila (penalty missed)		(penalty scored) Merheg; (penalty scored) Osorio; (penalty scored) Quiñones; (penalty missed) Torres; (penalty scored) D. Quintero

2 September 2025	Atlético	2–0 (2–2 agg.) (1–4 p)	Junior	Cali
19:30 UTC−5	Escobar 45'; Farías 79'	Report		Stadium: Pascual Guerrero; Referee: Wilmar Montaño
	Penalties
	Erazo (penalty missed); Farías (penalty missed); Peña (penalty scored)		(penalty scored) Acuña; (penalty scored) Castrillón; (penalty scored) Rodríguez; (penalty scored) Herrera

3 September 2025	América de Cali	2–0 (2–1 agg.)	Atlético Bucaramanga	Cali
17:15 UTC−5	García 11' (o.g.); Mosquera 44'	Report		Stadium: Pascual Guerrero; Referee: Álvaro Meléndez

3 September 2025	Independiente Medellín	2–1 (2–1 agg.)	Fortaleza	Medellín
19:30 UTC−5	Fydriszewski 33'; Berrío 90'	Report	Cuero 71'	Stadium: Atanasio Girardot; Referee: Jairo Mayorga

3 September 2025	Deportes Quindío	2–2 (2–6 agg.)	Atlético Nacional	Armenia
19:45 UTC−5	Caicedo 12', 73'	Report	Sarmiento 82', 90+1'	Stadium: Centenario; Referee: Sebastián Toro

9 September 2025	Santa Fe	4–1 (5–2 agg.)	Alianza	Bogotá
20:30 UTC−5	Mafla 45'; Rodríguez 49'; Y. Moreno 85'; Mina 86' (o.g.)	Report	Jo. Muñoz 76' (pen.)	Stadium: El Campín; Referee: Héctor Rivera

16 September 2025	Millonarios	0–0 (0–1 agg.)	Envigado	Bogotá
20:10 UTC−5		Report		Stadium: Metropolitano de Techo; Referee: Álvaro Meléndez

1 October 2025	Once Caldas	4–0 (6–1 agg.)	Deportivo Pasto	Manizales
19:00 UTC−5	Barrios 38'; Sánchez 40'; Quiñones 55'; Zuleta 83'	Report		Stadium: Palogrande; Referee: Diego Ruiz

=== Quarter-finals ===
Team 1	Agg.	Team 2	1st leg	2nd leg
Independiente Medellín	4–2	Santa Fe	1–2	3–0
Envigado	2–2 (2–1 p)	Deportivo Pereira	2–1	0–1
Junior	2–2 (7–8 p)	América de Cali	1–2	1–0
Once Caldas	0–3	Atlético Nacional	0–1	0–2

==== First leg ====
24 September 2025	Independiente Medellín	1–2	Santa Fe	Medellín
18:00 UTC−5	Fydriszewski 59'	Report	Mafla 33'; Rodallega 52'	Stadium: Atanasio Girardot; Referee: Álvaro Meléndez

2 October 2025	Junior	1–2	América de Cali	Barranquilla
20:00 UTC−5	Báez 82'	Report	Roa 44'; L. Ramos 53'	Stadium: Metropolitano Roberto Meléndez; Referee: Jonnathan Ortiz

7 October 2025	Envigado	2–1	Deportivo Pereira	Envigado
15:00 UTC−5	Londoño 5'; Valencia 90+3'	Report	D. Quintero 64'	Stadium: Polideportivo Sur; Referee: Diego Ulloa

9 October 2025	Once Caldas	0–1	Atlético Nacional	Manizales
19:30 UTC−5		Report	E. Cardona 50' (pen.)	Stadium: Palogrande; Referee: José Ortiz

==== Second leg ====
1 October 2025	Santa Fe	0–3 (2–4 agg.)	Independiente Medellín	Bogotá
20:00 UTC−5		Report	Fydriszewski 28', 78'; F. Chaverra 90+1'	Stadium: Metropolitano de Techo; Referee: Diego Ulloa

15 October 2025	América de Cali	0–1 (2–2 agg.) (8–7 p)	Junior	Cali
20:20 UTC−5		Report	Enamorado 37'	Stadium: Pascual Guerrero; Referee: José Ortiz
	Penalties
	Carrascal (penalty missed); Escobar (penalty scored); Palacios (penalty scored); Soto (penalty scored); A. Ramos (penalty scored); Borrero (penalty scored); Garcés (penalty scored); Castillo (penalty scored); Bertel (penalty scored)		(penalty missed) Suárez; (penalty scored) Castrillón; (penalty scored) Rodríguez; (penalty scored) Báez; (penalty scored) Gutiérrez; (penalty scored) Ángel; (penalty scored) Esparragoza; (penalty scored) D. Rivera; (penalty missed) Rivas

21 October 2025	Deportivo Pereira	1–0 (2–2 agg.) (1–2 p)	Envigado	Pereira
20:00 UTC−5	Merheg 90+2'	Report		Stadium: Hernán Ramírez Villegas; Referee: Ferney Trujillo
	Penalties
	Cabrera (penalty missed); Estacio (penalty missed); Merheg (penalty scored); Torres (penalty missed); D. Quintero (penalty missed)		(penalty scored) Hurtado; (penalty missed) Hinestroza; (penalty missed) Uribe; (penalty scored) Quejada

22 October 2025	Atlético Nacional	2–0 (3–0 agg.)	Once Caldas	Medellín
18:00 UTC−5	Sarmiento 29'; Salazar 88'	Report		Stadium: Atanasio Girardot; Referee: Diego Ulloa

=== Semi-finals ===
Team 1	Agg.	Team 2	1st leg	2nd leg
Envigado	1–2	Independiente Medellín	0–1	1–1
Atlético Nacional	6–3	América de Cali	4–1	2–2

==== First leg ====
2 November 2025	Atlético Nacional	4–1	América de Cali	Medellín
18:30 UTC−5	Bauza 37'; M. Uribe 50'; Rengifo 65'; Morelos 67'	Report	Garcés 81'	Stadium: Atanasio Girardot; Referee: Andrés Rojas

3 November 2025	Envigado	0–1	Independiente Medellín	Envigado
16:00 UTC−5		Report	Moreno 85'	Stadium: Polideportivo Sur; Referee: Jhon Ospina

==== Second leg ====
10 November 2025	Independiente Medellín	1–1 (2–1 agg.)	Envigado	Medellín
19:30 UTC−5	Moreno 38'	Report	Garcés 35' (pen.)	Stadium: Atanasio Girardot; Referee: Andrés Rojas

16 November 2025	América de Cali	2–2 (3–6 agg.)	Atlético Nacional	Cali
17:00 UTC−5	A. Ramos 61' (pen.), 90+4'	Report	Cándido 45+3'; M. Uribe 68'	Stadium: Pascual Guerrero; Referee: Jairo Mayorga

=== Finals ===
13 December 2025
17:00 UTC−5

Atlético Nacional	0–0	Independiente Medellín
	Report

Estadio Atanasio Girardot, Medellín
Referee: Jairo Mayorga

17 December 2025
19:30 UTC−5

Independiente Medellín	0–1	Atlético Nacional
	Report	Román 11'

Estadio Atanasio Girardot, Medellín
Referee: Wilmar Roldán

Atlético Nacional won 1–0 on aggregate.

== Top scorers ==
Rank	Player	Club	Goals
1	(Colombia) Jayder Asprilla	Real Cundinamarca	5
1	(Argentina) Francisco Fydriszewski	Independiente Medellín	5
3	(Colombia) Daniel Arcila	Envigado	4
3	(Argentina) Juan Bautista Farías	Atlético	4
3	(Colombia) Darwin Quintero	Deportivo Pereira	4
3	(Colombia) Andrés Sarmiento	Atlético Nacional	4
7	(Colombia) Jairo Molina	Boyacá Chicó	3
7	(Colombia) Brandon Caicedo	Deportes Quindío	3
7	(Paraguay) Cristian Báez	Junior	3
7	(Lebanon) Samy Merheg	Deportivo Pereira	3
7	(Argentina) Luciano Pons	Atlético Bucaramanga	3
7	(Colombia) Jeison Osorio	Alianza	3
7	(Colombia) Yojan Garcés	América de Cali	3
7	(Colombia) Alfredo Morelos	Atlético Nacional	3
7	(Colombia) Bayron Garcés	Envigado	3

Source: BeSoccer.

== See also ==
- 2025 Categoría Primera A season
- 2025 Categoría Primera B season
