= 2025 Torneo DIMAYOR =

Football league season in Colombia

Torneo DIMAYOR
- Season: 2025
- Dates: 30 January – 2 December 2025
- Champions: Torneo I: Jaguares (2nd title); Torneo II: Cúcuta Deportivo (4th title)
- Promoted: Jaguares; Cúcuta Deportivo
- Matches: 308
- Goals: 730 (2.37 per match)
- Top goalscorer: Torneo I: Andrés Rentería (18 goals); Torneo II: Andrés Rentería (14 goals)
- Biggest home win: R. Cartagena 5–0 Bogotá (9 February); Dep. Quindío 6–1 Bogotá (26 September)
- Biggest away win: Atlético 0–3 Atlético Huila (28 February); R. Santander 0–3 Inter Palmira (12 May); Bogotá 0–3 R. Cartagena (21 July); Barranquilla 1–4 Inter Palmira (1 September); Orsomarso 0–3 Boca Juniors (28 September); Inter Palmira 1–4 Jaguares (19 November); Patriotas 0–3 R. Cundinamarca (23 November)
- Highest scoring: R. Santander 3–4 R. Cundinamarca (15 February); R. Cundinamarca 5–2 Atlético (11 March); R. Cartagena 3–4 Jaguares (2 June); Dep. Quindío 6–1 Bogotá (26 September)

The 2025 Torneo DIMAYOR (officially known as the 2025 Torneo BetPlay Dimayor season for sponsorship reasons) was the 36th season of the Torneo DIMAYOR since its founding as Colombia's second division football league. The season began on 30 January and ended on 2 December 2025.

Jaguares, who won the Torneo I after defeating Patriotas in the finals, became the first team promoted to the top tier league Categoría Primera A for the 2026 season after securing a top two finish in the season's aggregate table with a 2–2 draw with Cúcuta Deportivo on 11 November 2025. The Torneo II was won by Cúcuta Deportivo, who defeated Real Cundinamarca on penalty kicks in the finals and promoted to Primera A after placing second in the season's aggregate table.

== Format changes ==
Although the tournament kept the same format that has been used in its most recent editions, with two tournaments per season with three stages each (a single round-robin first stage, two semi-final groups and a two-legged final series), changes were implemented to the method of promotion of teams to Categoría Primera A for the following season. For this season, the two promoted teams were decided under the following scenarios:

- If one team won both of the season's short tournaments (Torneo I and II), it earned promotion to the top flight and a two-legged promotion play-off series would be played by the next two teams in the season's aggregate table to decide the other promoted team.
- If both of the short tournament winners placed in the top two of the aggregate table at the end of the season, both teams would be promoted to Primera A and no additional stages would be played.
- If only one of the short tournament winners placed in the top two of the aggregate table, it would be promoted while the other tournament winner would play the promotion play-off against the best-placed team in the aggregate table that did not win any of the season's tournaments.
- If none of the short tournament winners ended up in the top two places of the aggregate table, both teams would play a grand final in which the winning side would be the first promoted team, and the loser of that grand final would play the aggregate table's top team in the promotion play-off for the remaining promotion berth.

== Teams ==
Sixteen teams took part in the season. The previous season's champions Unión Magdalena and runners-up Llaneros were promoted to Primera A for the 2025 season, being replaced in Primera B for this season by Jaguares and Patriotas, who were relegated from Primera A at the end of the 2024 season after finishing in the bottom two places of the top tier's relegation table.

For this season Orsomarso changed their home stadium, moving from their usual venue Estadio Francisco Rivera Escobar in Palmira to Estadio Municipal Raúl Miranda in Yumbo, Valle del Cauca Department after signing an agreement with the Yumbo Municipality to play there for one season. Although Orsomarso played most of their Torneo I home games in Yumbo, they chose to host their final match in that tournament at Estadio Daniel Villa Zapata in Barrancabermeja, aiming to get support from the city's inhabitants while also capitalizing on the local government's desire to have a professional team representing Barrancabermeja. Orsomarso eventually reached an agreement with the city's government and confirmed the relocation of their home matches to Estadio Daniel Villa Zapata starting from this season's Torneo II. The club's youth setup remained based in the Valle del Cauca Department.

Locations of the 2025 Categoría Primera B teams.

Club	City	Stadium	Capacity
Atlético	Cali	Pascual Guerrero	38,588
Atlético Huila	Neiva	Guillermo Plazas Alcid (Note: Starting from the Torneo II's semi-final stage, Atlético Huila played their home matches at Estadio Manuel Murillo Toro in Ibagué since their regular stadium Estadio Guillermo Plazas Alcid in Neiva was closed due to structural failures.)	12,000
Barranquilla	Barranquilla	Romelio Martínez	11,000
Boca Juniors de Cali	Cali	Pascual Guerrero	38,588
Bogotá	Bogotá	Metropolitano de Techo	10,000
Cúcuta Deportivo	Cúcuta	General Santander	42,901
Deportes Quindío	Armenia	Centenario	20,716
Inter Palmira	Palmira	Francisco Rivera Escobar	15,300
Itagüí Leones	Itagüí	Metropolitano Ciudad de Itagüí	12,000
Jaguares	Montería	Jaraguay	12,000
Orsomarso	Yumbo	Municipal Raúl Miranda	3,500
Orsomarso	Barrancabermeja	Daniel Villa Zapata	10,400
Patriotas	Tunja	La Independencia	20,630
Real Cartagena	Cartagena	Jaime Morón León	16,068
Real Cundinamarca	Bogotá	Parque Estadio Olaya Herrera	2,500
Real Santander	Piedecuesta	Villa Concha	5,500
Tigres	Bogotá	Metropolitano de Techo	10,000

== Torneo I ==
The Torneo I, officially known as the Torneo BetPlay Dimayor 2025–I, was the first tournament of the 2025 season. It began on 30 January and ended on 22 June 2025.

=== First stage ===
==== Standings ====
Pos	Team	Pld	W	D	L	GF	GA	GD	Pts	Qualification
1	Jaguares	16	10	4	2	26	14	+12	34	Advance to the semi-finals
2	Patriotas	16	10	3	3	21	8	+13	33	Advance to the semi-finals
3	Inter Palmira	16	10	2	4	24	15	+9	32	Advance to the semi-finals
4	Cúcuta Deportivo	16	9	4	3	24	15	+9	31	Advance to the semi-finals
5	Real Cundinamarca	16	8	5	3	25	16	+9	29	Advance to the semi-finals
6	Atlético Huila	16	8	5	3	19	10	+9	29	Advance to the semi-finals
7	Real Cartagena	16	8	4	4	30	21	+9	28	Advance to the semi-finals
8	Tigres	16	6	6	4	16	14	+2	24	Advance to the semi-finals
9	Itagüí Leones	16	5	3	8	22	24	−2	18	
10	Real Santander	16	5	3	8	15	23	−8	18	
11	Orsomarso	16	2	10	4	15	16	−1	16	
12	Deportes Quindío	16	3	5	8	13	26	−13	14	
13	Bogotá	16	3	4	9	17	32	−15	13	
14	Atlético	16	3	3	10	15	24	−9	12	
15	Barranquilla	16	2	5	9	12	27	−15	11	
16	Boca Juniors de Cali	16	2	2	12	11	20	−9	8	

Source: Dimayor, Soccerway
Rules for classification: 1) Points, 2) Goal difference, 3) Goals for, 4) Away goals for, 5) Away goals against, 6) Drawing of lots.

==== Results ====
Home \ Away	ATL	HUI	BAR	BOC	BOG	CUC	QUI	INT	LEO	JAG	ORS	PAT	RCA	RCU	RSA	TIG
Atlético	—	0–3	1–2	1–0	2–2	—	0–1	—	0–0	—	—	—	1–2	—	2–0	—
Atlético Huila	—	—	—	—	—	0–2	2–0	1–0	2–0	2–0	1–1	1–0	—	—	0–0	—
Barranquilla	—	0–0	—	0–0	2–0	—	1–1	—	2–3	0–1	—	—	2–2	—	1–2	—
Boca Juniors de Cali	2–1	1–2	—	—	—	0–2	4–0	—	—	0–1	0–1	1–2	—	—	0–1	—
Bogotá	—	2–3	—	1–0	—	—	1–1	—	—	2–2	2–2	0–2	—	—	2–1	1–2
Cúcuta Deportivo	0–3 (Note: Match awarded 0–3 to Atlético due to Cúcuta Deportivo fielding the player Cristián Álvarez, who was ineligible due to a sanction from FIFA. The match originally ended with Cúcuta Deportivo winning 4–2.)	—	4–1	—	2–0	—	—	1–1	—	—	—	—	1–1	1–1	2–1	2–0
Deportes Quindío	—	1–0	—	—	—	0–1	—	1–2	—	2–2	0–0	0–1	—	0–0	4–2	—
Inter Palmira	1–0	—	3–0	1–0	2–1	—	—	—	—	—	1–1	—	2–0	3–2	—	1–2
Itagüí Leones	—	—	—	1–1	3–0	0–1	4–1	1–2	—	1–3	—	—	1–2	3–1	—	—
Jaguares	3–1	—	—	—	—	1–2	—	3–0	2–0	—	1–1	1–0	—	1–1	—	1–0
Orsomarso	0–0	—	3–0	—	—	2–2	—	0–2	2–3	—	—	—	1–2	0–1	—	1–1
Patriotas	2–1	—	1–0	—	—	2–0	—	2–0	3–1	—	0–0	—	—	0–1	—	2–0
Real Cartagena	—	1–1	3–0	3–2	5–0	—	4–1	—	—	2–3	—	1–3	—	—	2–0	—
Real Cundinamarca	5–2	1–0	2–0	1–0	1–2	—	—	—	—	—	—	0–0	3–0	—	—	1–1
Real Santander	—	—	—	—	—	2–1	—	0–3	1–0	0–1	0–0	1–1	—	3–4	—	1–0
Tigres	1–0	1–1	1–1	2–0	2–1	—	2–0	—	1–1	—	—	—	0–0	—	—	—

Source: Dimayor, Soccerway
Legend: Blue = home team win; Yellow = draw; Red = away team win.

=== Semi-finals ===
The eight teams that advanced to the semi-finals were drawn into two groups of four teams, with the top two teams from the first stage being seeded in each group. The two group winners advanced to the finals.

==== Group A ====
Pos	Team	Pld	W	D	L	GF	GA	GD	Pts	Qualification	JAG	RCA	INT	TIG
1	Jaguares	6	4	1	1	9	5	+4	13	Advance to the Finals	—	2–0	2–1	0–1
2	Real Cartagena	6	2	2	2	11	10	+1	8		3–4	—	3–3	3–0
3	Inter Palmira	6	2	2	2	7	7	0	8		0–0	0–1	—	1–0
4	Tigres	6	1	1	4	3	8	−5	4		0–1	1–1	1–2	—

Source: Dimayor, Soccerway
Legend: Blue = home team win; Yellow = draw; Red = away team win.
Rules for classification: 1) Points, 2) First stage position (only applies for the seeded team, if it is involved in a tie), 3) Goal difference, 4) Goals for, 5) Away goals for, 6) Away goals against, 7) First stage position.

==== Group B ====
Pos	Team	Pld	W	D	L	GF	GA	GD	Pts	Qualification	PAT	HUI	CUC	RCU
1	Patriotas	6	3	1	2	7	6	+1	10 (Note: Patriotas ahead of Atlético Huila for being the group's seeded team.)	Advance to the Finals	—	1–1	3–2	0–1
2	Atlético Huila	6	3	1	2	10	7	+3	10		1–2	—	3–0	2–1
3	Cúcuta Deportivo	6	3	0	3	7	12	−5	9		1–0	2–1	—	2–1
4	Real Cundinamarca	6	2	0	4	8	7	+1	6		0–1	1–2	4–0	—

Source: Dimayor, Soccerway
Legend: Blue = home team win; Yellow = draw; Red = away team win.
Rules for classification: 1) Points, 2) First stage position (only applies for the seeded team, if it is involved in a tie), 3) Goal difference, 4) Goals for, 5) Away goals for, 6) Away goals against, 7) First stage position.

=== Finals ===
18 June 2025
19:30 UTC−5

Patriotas	0–0	Jaguares
	Report

Estadio La Independencia, Tunja
Referee: Diego Ulloa

22 June 2025
18:00 UTC−5

Jaguares	3–0	Patriotas
Rentería 7' (pen.); Ceter 68'; Herrera 86'	Report

Estadio Jaraguay, Montería
Referee: Wilmar Roldán

Jaguares won 3–0 on aggregate.

Torneo BetPlay DIMAYOR
2025–I champions

2nd title

=== Top scorers ===
Rank	Player	Club	Goals
1	(Colombia) Andrés Rentería	Jaguares	18
2	(Colombia) Fredy Montero	Real Cartagena	17
3	(Colombia) Jayder Asprilla	Real Cundinamarca	11
4	(Colombia) Juan David Valencia	Itagüí Leones	10
5	(Colombia) Stiwart Acuña	Barranquilla	8
6	(Argentina) Cristián Álvarez	Cúcuta Deportivo	7
6	(Colombia) Arney Rocha	Real Cundinamarca	7
8	(Colombia) Omar Duarte	Atlético Huila	6
8	(Colombia) Sebastián Girado	Orsomarso	6
8	(Argentina) Matías Pisano	Cúcuta Deportivo	6
8	(Colombia) Michell Ramos	Cúcuta Deportivo	6

Source: Soccerway

== Torneo II ==
The Torneo II, officially known as the Torneo BetPlay Dimayor 2025–II, is the second and last tournament of the 2025 season. It began on 13 July and ended on 2 December 2025.

=== First stage ===
==== Standings ====
Pos	Team	Pld	W	D	L	GF	GA	GD	Pts	Qualification
1	Jaguares	16	12	1	3	25	9	+16	37	Advance to the semi-finals
2	Patriotas	16	11	2	3	25	15	+10	35	Advance to the semi-finals
3	Cúcuta Deportivo	16	8	6	2	22	10	+12	30	Advance to the semi-finals
4	Real Cundinamarca	16	8	4	4	23	12	+11	28	Advance to the semi-finals
5	Inter Palmira	16	8	4	4	18	15	+3	28	Advance to the semi-finals
6	Real Cartagena	16	6	6	4	25	14	+11	24	Advance to the semi-finals
7	Atlético Huila	16	7	3	6	17	18	−1	24	Advance to the semi-finals
8	Boca Juniors de Cali	16	6	5	5	19	15	+4	23	Advance to the semi-finals
9	Deportes Quindío	16	6	5	5	25	22	+3	23	
10	Real Santander	16	5	2	9	18	18	0	17	
11	Orsomarso	16	4	5	7	13	19	−6	17	
12	Bogotá	16	4	4	8	13	28	−15	16	
13	Atlético	16	4	3	9	17	29	−12	15	
14	Tigres	16	3	5	8	14	21	−7	14	
15	Barranquilla	16	2	5	9	18	27	−9	11	
16	Itagüí Leones	16	2	4	10	8	28	−20	10	

Source: Dimayor, Soccerway
Rules for classification: 1) Points, 2) Goal difference, 3) Goals for, 4) Away goals for, 5) Away goals against, 6) Drawing of lots.

==== Results ====
Home \ Away	ATL	HUI	BAR	BOC	BOG	CUC	QUI	INT	LEO	JAG	ORS	PAT	RCA	RCU	RSA	TIG
Atlético	—	—	—	0–1	—	0–0	—	4–2	—	0–1	1–0	1–3	—	2–3	—	1–1
Atlético Huila	3–3	—	3–2	0–1	1–0	—	2–1	—	—	—	—	—	0–1	2–0	—	1–0
Barranquilla	1–2	—	—	—	—	1–2	—	1–4	—	—	0–2	3–1	3–1	1–1	—	2–2
Boca Juniors de Cali	1–2	—	1–0	—	2–1	—	—	2–0	1–1	—	—	—	2–2	0–1	—	0–1
Bogotá	2–0	—	1–0	—	—	2–1	—	2–2	0–1	—	—	—	0–3	0–3	—	1–0
Cúcuta Deportivo	—	0–0	—	1–0	—	—	2–2	—	4–0	1–2	1–0	2–0	—	—	2–1	—
Deportes Quindío	2–1	1–1	1–1	2–2	6–1	—	—	—	2–0	—	—	—	0–0	—	—	2–1
Inter Palmira	—	2–0	—	—	—	0–2	2–1	—	1–0	1–0	1–1	1–0	—	—	1–0	—
Itagüí Leones	1–0	1–2	2–2	—	—	—	—	—	—	0–1	0–1	0–1	—	—	1–1	1–1
Jaguares	—	3–0	2–1	1–1	2–0	—	2–0	—	4–0	—	—	—	2–1	—	1–0	—
Orsomarso	—	0–1	—	0–3	1–1	—	2–3	0–0	—	1–0	—	2–2	—	—	1–0	—
Patriotas	—	1–0	—	1–0	1–1	—	2–0	—	—	2–1	—	—	3–1	2–1	2–0	—
Real Cartagena	4–0	—	0–0	—	—	1–1	—	0–0	4–0	—	3–1	—	—	0–0	—	4–0
Real Cundinamarca	—	—	—	—	—	1–1	3–1	2–0	3–0	0–1	1–1	0–1	—	—	2–0	—
Real Santander	4–0	2–1	2–0	2–2	4–0	0–2	0–1	—	—	—	—	—	2–0	—	—	—
Tigres	—	—	—	—	1–1	0–0	—	0–1	—	1–2	2–0	2–3	—	0–2	2–0	—

Source: Dimayor, Soccerway
Legend: Blue = home team win; Yellow = draw; Red = away team win.

=== Semi-finals ===
The eight teams that advanced to the semi-finals were drawn into two groups of four teams, with the top two teams from the first stage being seeded in each group. The two group winners advanced to the finals.

==== Group A ====
Pos	Team	Pld	W	D	L	GF	GA	GD	Pts	Qualification	CUC	HUI	JAG	INT
1	Cúcuta Deportivo	6	4	1	1	11	6	+5	13	Advance to the Finals	—	2–1	2–2	4–0
2	Atlético Huila	6	3	2	1	10	7	+3	11		2–0	—	2–2	1–0
3	Jaguares	6	2	3	1	12	9	+3	9		1–2	2–2	—	1–0
4	Inter Palmira	6	0	0	6	2	13	−11	0		0–1	1–2	1–4	—

Source: Dimayor, Soccerway
Legend: Blue = home team win; Yellow = draw; Red = away team win.
Rules for classification: 1) Points, 2) First stage position (only applies for the seeded team, if it is involved in a tie), 3) Goal difference, 4) Goals for, 5) Away goals for, 6) Away goals against, 7) First stage position.

==== Group B ====
Pos	Team	Pld	W	D	L	GF	GA	GD	Pts	Qualification	RCU	PAT	RCA	BOC
1	Real Cundinamarca	6	4	1	1	7	2	+5	13	Advance to the Finals	—	1–0	1–2	1–0
2	Patriotas	6	2	1	3	4	7	−3	7 (Note: Patriotas ahead of Real Cartagena for being the group's seeded team.)		0–3	—	2–2	1–0
3	Real Cartagena	6	1	4	1	5	5	0	7		0–0	0–1	—	1–1
4	Boca Juniors de Cali	6	1	2	3	2	4	−2	5		0–1	1–0	0–0	—

Source: Dimayor, Soccerway
Legend: Blue = home team win; Yellow = draw; Red = away team win.
Rules for classification: 1) Points, 2) First stage position (only applies for the seeded team, if it is involved in a tie), 3) Goal difference, 4) Goals for, 5) Away goals for, 6) Away goals against, 7) First stage position.

=== Finals ===
27 November 2025
20:30 UTC−5

Real Cundinamarca	1–0	Cúcuta Deportivo
Caicedo 26'	Report

Estadio Metropolitano de Techo, Bogotá
Referee: Carlos Betancur

2 December 2025
15:45 UTC−5

Cúcuta Deportivo	2–1	Real Cundinamarca
Ríos 13'; Agudelo 53'	Report	Rocha 45'
Penalties
Ríos (penalty missed); Calcaterra (penalty scored); Guevara (penalty missed); Duarte (penalty scored); Álvarez (penalty scored)	3–2	(penalty missed) Asprilla; (penalty scored) Viveros; (penalty scored) Moreno; (penalty missed) Caicedo; (penalty missed) Cataño

Estadio General Santander, Cúcuta
Referee: Jhon Ospina

Tied 2–2 on aggregate, Cúcuta Deportivo won on penalties.

Torneo BetPlay DIMAYOR
2025–II champions

4th title

=== Top scorers ===
Rank	Player	Club	Goals
1	(Colombia) Andrés Rentería	Jaguares	14
2	(Colombia) Fredy Montero	Real Cartagena	13
3	(Colombia) Jonathan Agudelo	Cúcuta Deportivo	11
3	(Colombia) Jayder Asprilla	Real Cundinamarca	11
5	(Colombia) Omar Duarte	Atlético Huila	7
6	(Colombia) Bayron Caicedo	Real Cundinamarca	6
6	(Colombia) Arney Rocha	Real Cundinamarca	6
8	(Colombia) Jorge Mendoza	Boca Juniors de Cali	5
8	(Colombia) Harold Ortiz	Boca Juniors de Cali	5
8	(Colombia) Andrés Carabalí	Deportes Quindío	5
8	(Colombia) Jackson Jaramillo	Boca Juniors de Cali	5

Source: Besoccer

== Aggregate table ==
Pos	Team	Pld	W	D	L	GF	GA	GD	Pts	Promotion or qualification
1	Jaguares (C, P)	46	29	10	7	75	37	+38	97	Promotion to Categoría Primera A
2	Cúcuta Deportivo (C, P)	46	25	11	10	66	45	+21	86	Promotion to Categoría Primera A
3	Patriotas	46	26	8	12	57	39	+18	86	
4	Real Cundinamarca	46	23	10	13	65	39	+26	79	
5	Atlético Huila	44	21	11	12	56	42	+14	74	
6	Inter Palmira	44	20	8	16	51	50	+1	68	
7	Real Cartagena	44	17	16	11	71	50	+21	67	
8	Tigres	38	10	12	16	33	43	−10	42	
9	Deportes Quindío	32	9	10	13	38	48	−10	37	
10	Boca Juniors de Cali	38	9	9	20	32	39	−7	36	
11	Real Santander	32	10	5	17	33	41	−8	35	
12	Orsomarso	32	6	15	11	28	35	−7	33	
13	Bogotá	32	7	8	17	30	60	−30	29	
14	Itagüí Leones	32	7	7	18	30	52	−22	28	
15	Atlético	32	7	6	19	32	53	−21	27	
16	Barranquilla	32	4	10	18	30	54	−24	22	

Source: Dimayor
Rules for classification: 1) Points, 2) Goal difference, 3) Goals for, 4) Away goals for, 5) Away goals against, 6) Drawing of lots.
(C) Champions; (P) Promoted

== Promotion play-off ==
Since both season champions (Jaguares and Cúcuta Deportivo) also ended up as the top two teams in the aggregate table, both earned automatic promotion to the Categoría Primera A and the promotion play-off was not played.

== See also ==
- 2025 Categoría Primera A season
- 2025 Copa Colombia
