= 2023 Torneo DIMAYOR =

Torneo BetPlay Dimayor
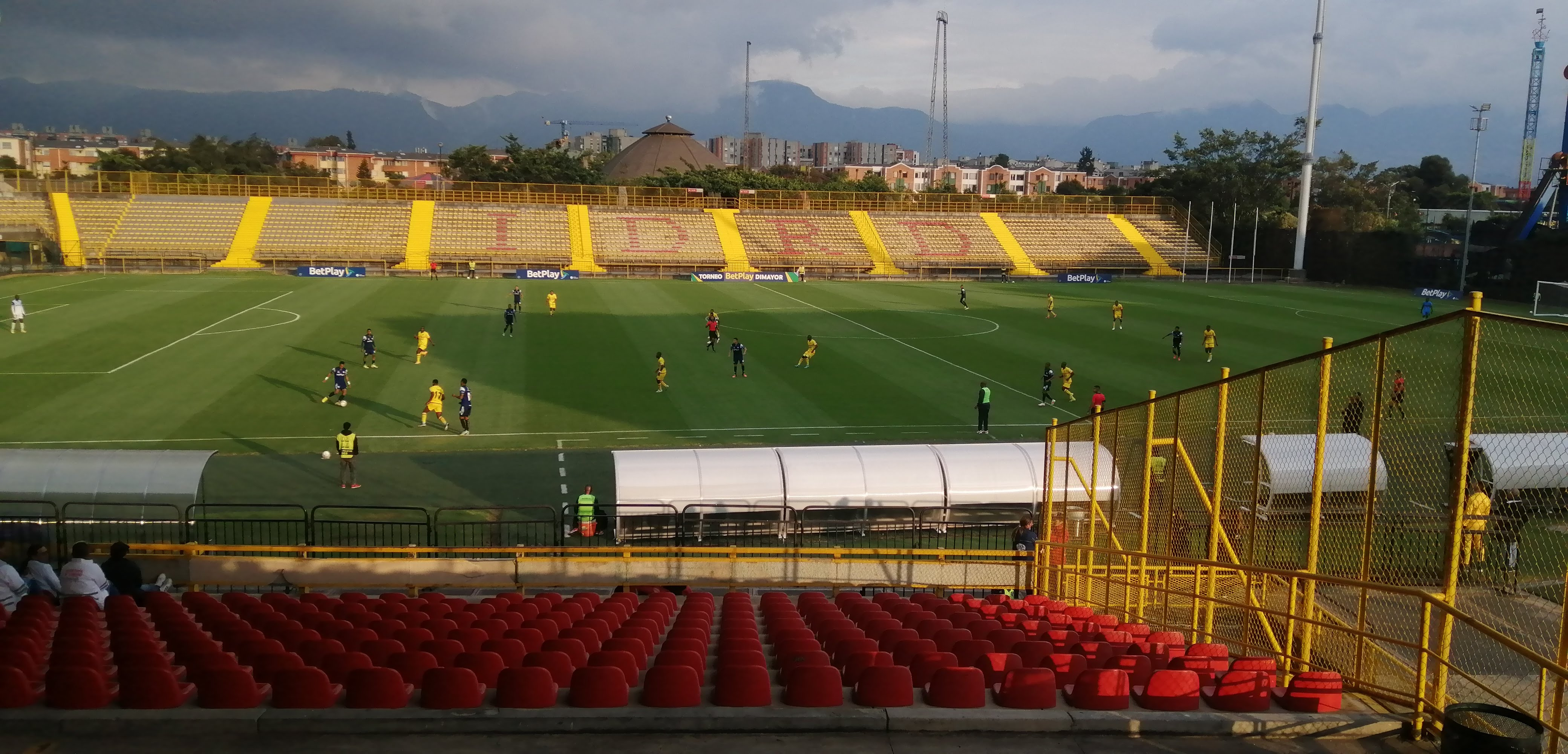
- 2023 Primera B match between Bogotá and Atlético
- Season: 2023
- Dates: 2 February – 28 November 2023
- Champions: Patriotas (1st title)
- Promoted: Patriotas; Fortaleza
- Matches: 310
- Goals: 681 (2.2 per match)
- Top goalscorer: Torneo I: Santiago Gómez (10 goals); Torneo II: Jhonier Blanco (15 goals)
- Biggest home win: Patriotas 4–0 Boca Juniors (9 March); Fortaleza 5–1 Valledupar (20 April); Fortaleza 4–0 Real Cartagena (19 May); Leones 4–0 Orsomarso (24 August); Patriotas 4–0 Tigres (11 October)
- Biggest away win: Barranquilla 0–5 Cortuluá (8 March)
- Highest scoring: Valledupar 5–3 Leones (23 April)

The 2023 Categoría Primera B season (officially known as the 2023 Torneo BetPlay Dimayor season for sponsorship reasons) was the 34th season of the Categoría Primera B since its founding as Colombia's second division football league. The season began on 2 February and ended on 28 November 2023.

Patriotas won their first Primera B title as well as promotion to the top tier Categoría Primera A at the end of the season, defeating Fortaleza 3–2 on aggregate in the Grand Final. Runners-up Fortaleza were also promoted after placing first in the season's aggregate table.

== Format ==
The format for the 2023 Primera B season was approved at DIMAYOR's General Assembly session of 14 December 2022 and confirmed on 12 January 2023, keeping the system used in the previous season.

Two tournaments (Torneo I and Torneo II) with three stages each were played. In the first stage of both tournaments, the 16 teams played a single round-robin tournament with an additional matchday for regional derbies and home-and-away order reversed for the Torneo II. The top eight teams at the end of the sixteen rounds advanced to the semi-final stage, in which teams were drawn into two groups of four where they played each one of their rivals twice. The top team of each group advanced to the finals, playing a double-legged series with the winners advancing to the season's Grand Final.

The Grand Final to decide the season champions as well as the first promotion to Primera A, was a double-legged series contested at the end of the season by the winners of the season's two tournaments. If one team won both of the season's tournaments, the Grand Final would not be played and that team would be automatically crowned Primera B champions and promoted to the top flight. The second promotion spot to Primera A for the 2024 season would be decided in a promotion play-off between the Grand Final loser and the best-placed team of the season's aggregate table, other than the Grand Final winners. If the Grand Final losers were the same team that topped the aggregate table, that team would also earn promotion and the play-off would not be played.

== Teams ==
16 teams took part in the season. The previous season's champions Boyacá Chicó and the winners of the promotion play-off series Atlético Huila were promoted to Primera A for the 2023 season and were replaced in Primera B by Patriotas and Cortuluá, who were relegated from Primera A at the end of the 2022 season after finishing in the bottom two places of the top tier's relegation table.

On 14 December 2022 the General Assembly of DIMAYOR approved a proposal by Cortuluá to move their home matches from Tuluá to Yumbo, Valle del Cauca Department, starting from this season.

On 22 June 2023, and motivated by the lack of support from both the government and local private enterprises, the board of Valledupar voted 4–1 to move the club to Soacha and rebrand it, effectively folding the existing club. The move was confirmed at a General Assembly of DIMAYOR on 6 July 2023, in which Real Soacha Cundinamarca was announced as the new club that replaced Valledupar for the second half of the season.

Locations of the 2023 Categoría Primera B teams

Club	City	Stadium	Capacity
Atlético	Cali	Pascual Guerrero	33,130
Barranquilla	Barranquilla	Romelio Martínez	8,000
Boca Juniors de Cali	Cali	Pascual Guerrero	33,130
Bogotá	Bogotá	Metropolitano de Techo	8,000
Cortuluá	Yumbo	Municipal Raúl Miranda	3,500
Cúcuta Deportivo	Cúcuta	General Santander	42,901
Deportes Quindío	Armenia	Centenario	20,716
Fortaleza	Bogotá	Metropolitano de Techo	8,000
Leones	Itagüí	Metropolitano Ciudad de Itagüí	12,000
Llaneros	Villavicencio	Bello Horizonte	15,000
Orsomarso	Palmira	Francisco Rivera Escobar	15,300
Patriotas	Tunja	La Independencia	20,630
Real Cartagena	Cartagena	Jaime Morón León	16,068
Real Santander	Piedecuesta	Villa Concha	5,500
Real Soacha Cundinamarca (Note: Replaced Valledupar for the Torneo II.)	Soacha	Luis Carlos Galán Sarmiento	8,000
Tigres	Bogotá	Metropolitano de Techo	8,000
Valledupar	Valledupar	Armando Maestre Pavajeau	11,000

== Torneo I ==
=== First stage ===
==== Standings ====
Pos	Team	Pld	W	D	L	GF	GA	GD	Pts	Qualification
1	Llaneros	16	9	5	2	19	10	+9	32	Advance to the semi-finals
2	Patriotas	16	8	6	2	20	7	+13	30	Advance to the semi-finals
3	Cúcuta Deportivo	16	7	7	2	19	12	+7	28	Advance to the semi-finals
4	Deportes Quindío	16	8	4	4	17	12	+5	28	Advance to the semi-finals
5	Cortuluá	16	7	6	3	22	16	+6	27	Advance to the semi-finals
6	Real Cartagena	16	7	5	4	24	19	+5	26	Advance to the semi-finals
7	Fortaleza	16	6	7	3	20	15	+5	25	Advance to the semi-finals
8	Valledupar	16	5	6	5	18	21	−3	21	Advance to the semi-finals
9	Real Santander	16	5	5	6	13	12	+1	20	
10	Leones	16	4	6	6	26	28	−2	18	
11	Bogotá	16	4	5	7	12	16	−4	17	
12	Barranquilla	16	5	2	9	18	24	−6	17	
13	Orsomarso	16	5	2	9	12	20	−8	17	
14	Tigres	16	4	3	9	7	13	−6	15	
15	Boca Juniors de Cali	16	2	6	8	14	22	−8	12	
16	Atlético	16	1	7	8	16	30	−14	10	

Source: Dimayor, Soccerway
Rules for classification: 1) Points, 2) Goal difference, 3) Goals for, 4) Away goals for, 5) Away goals against, 6) Drawing of lots.

==== Results ====
Home \ Away	ATL	BAR	BOC	BOG	COR	CUC	QUI	FOR	LEO	LLA	ORS	PAT	RCA	RSA	TIG	VAL
Atlético	—	0–3	1–1	—	1–1	—	—	—	4–3	—	—	0–0	1–3	1–1	0–0	—
Barranquilla	—	—	—	—	0–5	0–1	—	—	2–3	0–1	—	1–2	2–2	1–0	—	0–0
Boca Juniors de Cali	2–2	1–2	—	1–0	—	—	1–2	0–0	—	—	0–0	—	2–0	—	1–2	—
Bogotá	1–1	2–0	—	—	—	—	0–0	0–0	4–3	—	3–0	—	0–2	—	0–1	—
Cortuluá	—	—	2–1	0–0	—	2–2	2–1	0–1	—	1–1	—	—	—	1–0	—	1–0
Cúcuta Deportivo	2–1	—	2–1	2–0	—	—	0–0	—	—	1–1	1–0	—	—	2–0	1–0	—
Deportes Quindío	4–2	2–0	—	—	—	—	—	1–0	0–3	—	1–1	1–0	2–0	—	1–0	—
Fortaleza	2–1	3–1	—	—	—	1–1	—	—	—	1–1	3–1	1–1	—	—	1–0	5–1
Leones	—	—	1–1	—	2–2	2–1	—	2–2	—	0–1	—	0–0	—	1–1	—	0–2
Llaneros	3–0	—	2–1	2–0	1–3	—	1–0	—	—	—	2–1	—	2–1	—	1–0	—
Orsomarso	1–0	1–3	—	—	0–1	—	1–0	—	1–0	—	—	0–1	0–2	—	2–0	—
Patriotas	—	—	4–0	2–0	1–1	0–0	—	3–0	—	1–0	—	—	—	1–0	—	0–0
Real Cartagena	—	0–3	—	—	2–0	2–2	—	0–0	2–2	—	—	3–2	—	1–1	—	2–0
Real Santander	—	—	1–1	2–0	—	1–0	0–1	2–0	—	0–0	0–1	—	—	—	—	3–1
Tigres	—	1–0	—	0–0	3–0	—	—	—	0–1	—	—	0–2	0–2	0–1	—	0–0
Valledupar	3–1	—	1–0	0–2	—	1–1	1–1	—	5–3	0–0	3–2	—	—	—	—	—

Source: Dimayor, Soccerway
Legend: Blue = home team win; Yellow = draw; Red = away team win.

=== Semi-finals ===
The eight teams that advanced to the semi-finals were drawn into two groups of four teams, with the top two teams from the first stage being seeded in each group. The two group winners advanced to the final.

==== Group A ====
Pos	Team	Pld	W	D	L	GF	GA	GD	Pts	Qualification	LLA	FOR	RCA	QUI
1	Llaneros	6	4	1	1	9	5	+4	13	Advance to the Finals	—	2–1	1–0	2–0
2	Fortaleza	6	4	0	2	11	3	+8	12		0–1	—	4–0	3–0
3	Real Cartagena	6	1	2	3	5	10	−5	5		2–1	0–1	—	1–1
4	Deportes Quindío	6	0	3	3	5	12	−7	3		2–2	0–2	2–2	—

Source: Dimayor, Soccerway
Legend: Blue = home team win; Yellow = draw; Red = away team win.
Rules for classification: 1) Points, 2) First stage position (only applies for the seeded team, if it is involved in a tie), 3) Goal difference, 4) Goals for, 5) Away goals for, 6) Away goals against, 7) Yellow cards, 8) Red cards, 9) First stage position.

==== Group B ====
Pos	Team	Pld	W	D	L	GF	GA	GD	Pts	Qualification	PAT	CUC	VAL	COR
1	Patriotas	6	1	5	0	6	4	+2	8 (Note: Patriotas ahead of Cúcuta Deportivo for being the group's seeded team.)	Advance to the Finals	—	2–2	2–0	0–0
2	Cúcuta Deportivo	6	1	5	0	10	8	+2	8		1–1	—	1–1	2–2
3	Valledupar	6	1	3	2	5	6	−1	6		1–1	1–1	—	0–1
4	Cortuluá	6	1	3	2	4	7	−3	6		0–0	1–3	0–2	—

Source: Dimayor, Soccerway
Legend: Blue = home team win; Yellow = draw; Red = away team win.
Rules for classification: 1) Points, 2) First stage position (only applies for the seeded team, if it is involved in a tie), 3) Goal difference, 4) Goals for, 5) Away goals for, 6) Away goals against, 7) Yellow cards, 8) Red cards, 9) First stage position.

=== Finals ===
18 June 2023
18:00 UTC−5

Patriotas	1–0	Llaneros
Barragán 78'	Report

Estadio La Independencia, Tunja
Referee: Carlos Ortega

23 June 2023
20:00 UTC−5

Llaneros	0–0	Patriotas
	Report

Estadio Bello Horizonte, Villavicencio
Referee: Wilmar Roldán

Patriotas won 1–0 on aggregate.

Torneo BetPlay DIMAYOR
2023–I winners

=== Top scorers ===
Rank	Player	Club	Goals
1	(Argentina) Santiago Gómez	Real Cartagena	10
2	(Colombia) Misael Martínez	Valledupar	9
3	(Colombia) Carlos Lucumí	Fortaleza	8
3	(Colombia) Dairon Valencia	Valledupar	8
5	(Colombia) Johar Mejía	Cortuluá	7
5	(Colombia) Néider Ospina	Llaneros	7
5	(Colombia) Jefry Zapata	Cúcuta Deportivo	7
8	(Colombia) Stiwart Acuña	Barranquilla	6
8	(Colombia) Jonathan Agudelo	Cúcuta Deportivo	6
8	(Colombia) Jhonier Blanco	Fortaleza	6
8	(Colombia) Santiago Córdoba	Patriotas	6
8	(Colombia) Jairo Ditta	Cortuluá	6
8	(Colombia) Iván Rivas	Patriotas	6
8	(Colombia) Alexis Serna	Deportes Quindío	6

Source: Soccerway

== Torneo II ==
=== First stage ===
==== Standings ====
Pos	Team	Pld	W	D	L	GF	GA	GD	Pts	Qualification
1	Fortaleza	16	12	3	1	24	9	+15	39	Advance to the semi-finals
2	Llaneros	16	7	6	3	19	10	+9	27	Advance to the semi-finals
3	Cúcuta Deportivo	16	7	6	3	22	15	+7	27	Advance to the semi-finals
4	Real Cartagena	16	7	6	3	20	15	+5	27	Advance to the semi-finals
5	Barranquilla	16	7	5	4	20	19	+1	26	Advance to the semi-finals
6	Leones	16	7	3	6	28	23	+5	24	Advance to the semi-finals
7	Atlético	16	7	3	6	19	19	0	24	Advance to the semi-finals
8	Boca Juniors de Cali	16	6	4	6	13	14	−1	22	Advance to the semi-finals
9	Patriotas	16	6	3	7	19	19	0	21	
10	Real Santander	16	5	6	5	18	19	−1	21	
11	Deportes Quindío	16	4	6	6	13	18	−5	18	
12	Cortuluá	16	4	5	7	17	15	+2	17	
13	Bogotá	16	4	4	8	11	17	−6	16	
14	Orsomarso	16	4	3	9	11	20	−9	15	
15	Real Soacha Cundinamarca	16	2	8	6	13	19	−6	14	
16	Tigres	16	2	3	11	12	28	−16	9	

Source: Dimayor, Soccerway
Rules for classification: 1) Points, 2) Goal difference, 3) Goals for, 4) Away goals for, 5) Away goals against, 6) Drawing of lots.

==== Results ====
Home \ Away	ATL	BAR	BOC	BOG	COR	CUC	QUI	FOR	LEO	LLA	ORS	PAT	RCA	RSA	RSC	TIG
Atlético	—	—	2–0	0–2	—	1–0	2–2	0–0	—	0–0	0–1	—	—	—	1–2	—
Barranquilla	3–1	—	1–0	2–0	—	—	4–1	1–1	—	—	2–1	—	0–0	—	—	0–0
Boca Juniors de Cali	1–2	—	—	—	1–0	1–0	—	—	2–2	0–0	—	0–0	—	0–0	1–0	—
Bogotá	—	—	1–0	—	1–1	0–2	—	—	—	0–0	—	0–1	—	1–2	0–0	1–0
Cortuluá	0–1	1–1	—	—	—	—	—	—	0–1	2–0	3–0	3–1	0–1	—	—	3–0
Cúcuta Deportivo	—	1–2	—	—	1–1	—	—	1–0	2–2	—	—	4–3	2–0	1–1	2–0	—
Deportes Quindío	—	—	2–3	1–0	2–1	0–1	—	—	—	0–0	0–1	—	—	1–1	1–1	—
Fortaleza	—	—	1–0	2–1	2–0	—	1–0	—	3–1	—	—	1–0	1–0	2–0	—	—
Leones	1–2	2–0	—	1–0	—	—	0–0	—	—	—	4–0	—	1–2	—	3–2	1–2
Llaneros	—	3–0	—	—	1–0	1–1	—	1–2	4–3	—	—	0–1	—	2–0	3–0	—
Orsomarso	—	—	0–1	2–0	—	1–2	0–0	0–1	—	0–2	—	—	—	2–2	0–0	—
Patriotas	2–1	2–0	—	—	—	—	1–2	0–2	1–3	—	1–0	—	0–0	—	—	4–0
Real Cartagena	3–1	1–2	3–2	3–3	—	—	2–0	—	—	1–1	1–0	—	—	—	—	1–1
Real Santander	0–2	4–1	—	—	2–2	0–0	—	—	2–1	—	—	2–1	0–1	—	—	1–2
Real Soacha Cundinamarca	—	1–1	—	—	0–0	—	—	2–2	1–2	—	—	1–1	1–1	0–1	—	2–0
Tigres	2–3	—	0–1	0–1	—	2–2	0–1	2–3	—	0–1	1–3	—	—	—	—	—

Source: Dimayor, Soccerway
Legend: Blue = home team win; Yellow = draw; Red = away team win.

=== Semi-finals ===
The eight teams that advanced to the semi-finals were drawn into two groups of four teams, with the top two teams from the first stage being seeded in each group. The two group winners will advance to the final.

==== Group A ====
Pos	Team	Pld	W	D	L	GF	GA	GD	Pts	Qualification	FOR	LEO	BOC	RCA
1	Fortaleza	6	4	1	1	10	7	+3	13	Advance to the Finals	—	2–1	2–1	3–0
2	Leones	6	3	2	1	13	9	+4	11		3–0	—	3–2	2–1
3	Boca Juniors de Cali	6	1	2	3	9	11	−2	5		1–1	3–3	—	2–1
4	Real Cartagena	6	1	1	4	5	10	−5	4		1–2	1–1	1–0	—

Source: Dimayor, Soccerway
Legend: Blue = home team win; Yellow = draw; Red = away team win.
Rules for classification: 1) Points, 2) First stage position (only applies for the seeded team, if it is involved in a tie), 3) Goal difference, 4) Goals for, 5) Away goals for, 6) Away goals against, 7) Yellow cards, 8) Red cards, 9) First stage position.

==== Group B ====
Pos	Team	Pld	W	D	L	GF	GA	GD	Pts	Qualification	CUC	LLA	BAR	ATL
1	Cúcuta Deportivo	6	4	1	1	7	4	+3	13	Advance to the Finals	—	3–2	1–0	1–0
2	Llaneros	6	3	2	1	10	7	+3	11		1–0	—	4–2	1–0
3	Barranquilla	6	1	2	3	4	7	−3	5		0–1	0–0	—	2–1
4	Atlético	6	0	3	3	4	7	−3	3		1–1	2–2	0–0	—

Source: Dimayor, Soccerway
Legend: Blue = home team win; Yellow = draw; Red = away team win.
Rules for classification: 1) Points, 2) First stage position (only applies for the seeded team, if it is involved in a tie), 3) Goal difference, 4) Goals for, 5) Away goals for, 6) Away goals against, 7) Yellow cards, 8) Red cards, 9) First stage position.

=== Finals ===
14 November 2023
19:30 UTC−5

Cúcuta Deportivo	1–0	Fortaleza
Peralta 26'	Report

Estadio General Santander, Cúcuta
Referee: Nolberto Ararat

17 November 2023
19:30 UTC−5

Fortaleza	2–0	Cúcuta Deportivo
Blanco 19'; Cuero 69'	Report

Estadio Metropolitano de Techo, Bogotá
Referee: Diego Ulloa

Torneo BetPlay DIMAYOR
2023–II winners

=== Top scorers ===
Rank	Player	Club	Goals
1	(Colombia) Jhonier Blanco	Fortaleza	15
2	(Colombia) Santiago Córdoba	Patriotas	9
2	(Argentina) Santiago Gómez	Real Cartagena	9
4	(Colombia) Andrés Carabalí	Atlético	8
4	(Colombia) Mateo Zuleta	Leones	8
6	(Colombia) Ferney Angulo	Boca Juniors de Cali	7
6	(Colombia) Juan Sebastián Herrera	Leones	7
6	(Argentina) Lucas Ríos	Cúcuta Deportivo	7
9	(Colombia) Yeison Fuentes	Leones	6
9	(Colombia) Sebastián Navarro	Fortaleza	6

Source: Soccerway

== Grand Final ==
22 November 2023
19:30 UTC−5

Patriotas	3–1	Fortaleza
De las Salas 17'; Córdoba 79'; Alarcón 86'	Report	Rodríguez 43'

Estadio La Independencia, Tunja
Referee: David Espinosa

28 November 2023
19:30 UTC−5

Fortaleza	1–0	Patriotas
Navarro 17'	Report

Estadio Metropolitano de Techo, Bogotá
Referee: Luis Delgado

Patriotas won 3–2 on aggregate.

Torneo BetPlay DIMAYOR
2023 champions

1st title

== Aggregate table ==
Pos	Team	Pld	W	D	L	GF	GA	GD	Pts	Promotion
1	Fortaleza (P)	48	28	11	9	69	38	+31	95	Promotion to Categoría Primera A
2	Llaneros	46	23	15	8	57	33	+24	84	
3	Cúcuta Deportivo	46	20	19	7	59	41	+18	79	
4	Patriotas (C, P)	42	17	15	10	49	32	+17	66	Promotion to Categoría Primera A
5	Real Cartagena	44	16	14	14	54	54	0	62	
6	Leones	38	14	11	13	67	60	+7	53	
7	Cortuluá	38	12	14	12	43	38	+5	50	
8	Deportes Quindío	38	12	13	13	35	42	−7	49	
9	Barranquilla	38	13	9	16	42	50	−8	48	
10	Real Santander	32	10	11	11	31	31	0	41	
11	Real Soacha Cundinamarca	38	8	17	13	36	46	−10	41	
12	Boca Juniors de Cali	38	9	12	17	36	47	−11	39	
13	Atlético	38	8	13	17	39	56	−17	37	
14	Bogotá	32	8	9	15	23	33	−10	33	
15	Orsomarso	32	9	5	18	23	40	−17	32	
16	Tigres	32	6	6	20	19	41	−22	24	

Source: Dimayor
Rules for classification: 1) Points, 2) Goal difference, 3) Goals for, 4) Away goals for, 5) Away goals against, 6) Drawing of lots.
(C) Champions; (P) Promoted

== Promotion play-off ==
Since the season runners-up Fortaleza also ended up as the best-placed team in the aggregate table, they earned automatic promotion to the Categoría Primera A and the promotion play-off was not played.

== See also ==
- 2023 Categoría Primera A season
- 2023 Copa Colombia
