= Samy Merheg =

Footballer (born 2006)

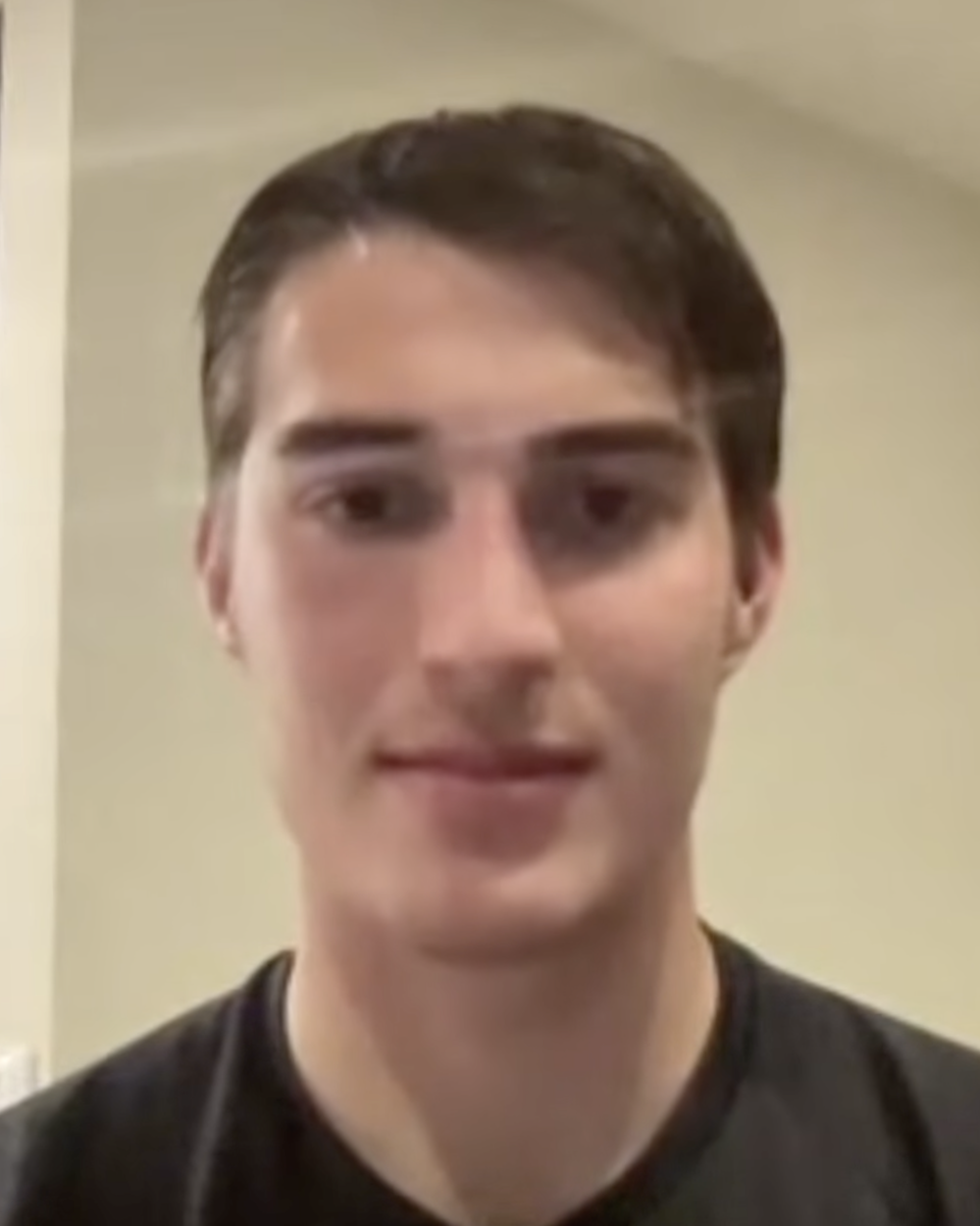
- Merheg in 2026

Personal information
- Full name: Samy Habib Merheg
- Birth name: Samy Merheg Enciso
- Date of birth: 6 December 2006 (age 19)
- Place of birth: Pereira, Colombia
- Height: 1.86 m (6 ft 1 in)
- Position: Striker

Team information
- Current team: Alverca
- Number: 17

Youth career
- 2014–2016: Salam Zgharta
- 2016–2017: Marcet
- 2017–2018: Sant Cugat
- 2018: Cornellà
- 2021: VyV Mi Nuevo Tolima
- 2022: Rosario Central
- 2023–2024: Deportivo Pereira

Senior career*
Years	Team	Apps	(Gls)
2024–2025	Deportivo Pereira	28	(5)
2026	Braga B	10	(4)
2026–	Alverca	4	(0)

International career^{‡}
2022	Lebanon U16	2	(1)
2024	Lebanon U20	1	(0)
2024–	Lebanon	15	(7)
- * Club domestic league appearances and goals as of 29 August 2026 ‡ National team caps and goals as of 17 November 2026

Samy Habib Merheg (Note: In Lebanon his full name is Samy Habib Merheg, while in Colombia his full name is Samy Merheg Enciso.) (Arabic: سامي حبيب مرهج; born 6 December 2006) is a professional footballer who plays as a striker for Primeira Liga club Alverca. Born in Colombia, he plays for the Lebanon national team.

Coming through the youth system, Merheg made his professional debut for Deportivo Pereira in 2024. He joined Portuguese club Braga in 2026, featuring for the reserve team before signing for Alverca later that year. Internationally, he represented Lebanon at under-16 and under-20 levels before making his senior debut in 2024.

== Early life ==
Merheg was born in Pereira, Risaralda Department, Colombia, to politician Habib Merheg and Juliana Enciso, a politician and former volleyball player. His father is of Lebanese descent from both parents. His maternal uncle is former professional footballer Leonardo Enciso, while his paternal uncle is politician Juan Samy Merheg.

As a child, Merheg moved with his family to Bishmizzine, Koura District, Lebanon, where he attended Bishmizzine High School. He began playing football during school breaks at the age of six or seven, having previously been introduced to the sport by his maternal grandfather.

== Club career ==
=== Youth ===
Encouraged by his school coach, Merheg began organised football training aged seven, joining Salam Zgharta's academy before moving to their affiliated Koura Football Academy. After impressing at a youth tournament in Barcelona, he earned a scholarship to continue his development at Marcet in 2016, where he also played for partner club Tecnofútbol. He later represented Sant Cugat and Cornellà in Spain.

After returning to Colombia, Merheg represented the Risaralda Department youth team between 2019 and 2020. In 2021, he joined VyV Mi Nuevo Tolima, scoring six goals in 10 matches for their under-15 side. He signed with Argentine club Rosario Central in 2022, but could not be registered with the Argentine Football Association due to his age, leading to his return to Colombia. In 2023, he joined Deportivo Pereira, where he scored eight goals in five matches for the under-17 team, and five goals in 10 matches for the under-20 team.

=== Deportivo Pereira ===
On 17 February 2024, aged 17 years and 73 days, Merheg made his professional debut with Deportivo Pereira, starting and playing 58 minutes in a 1–0 win against Santa Fe, before being replaced by Andrés Ibargüen. He finished the 2024 season with five games in all competitions.

On 15 April 2025, Merheg scored his first goal for Deportivo Pereira and provided an assist in a 2–0 win against Deportivo Cali. He scored a brace on 27 August 2025, including a 90+5th minute winner, helping his side defeat Real Cundinamarca 4–3 in the Copa Colombia. On 18 November 2025, after scoring eight goals and providing three assists in 29 appearances during the 2025 season, Merheg announced his departure from Deportivo Pereira, a decision that came amid the club's ongoing financial difficulties and contractual issues affecting the squad.

=== Braga B ===
On 30 December 2025, Primeira Liga side Braga announced the signing of Merheg on a free transfer, effective from 1 January 2026; he signed a contract running until the summer of 2028, with an option for two additional seasons. Merheg was first called up on 14 January 2026 for a Taça de Portugal quarter-final against AD Fafe, remaining an unused substitute. He made his debut for the reserve team, Braga B, on 15 February 2026, starting in a Liga 3 match against AD Fafe, which ended in a 2–1 defeat. His first goals came on 22 February, scoring twice for the reserves in a 2–0 win against Marco 09. Merheg finished the 2025–26 Liga 3 season with four goals in 10 games.

=== Alverca ===
After rescinding his contract with Braga by mutual agreement, Merheg signed for Alverca on 18 July 2026, ahead of the 2026–27 Primeira Liga season, on a three-year contract. As part of the agreement, Braga retained a 50% sell-on interest in the player. He made his debut in the first matchday of the season, on 9 August 2026, as a 67th-minute substitute in a 2–0 defeat to Porto.

== International career ==
Born in Colombia, Merheg was eligible to represent both Colombia and Lebanon at international level, as his paternal grandparents were from Lebanon.

=== Youth ===
Merheg played for the Lebanon under-16 team in two friendly matches against Malta in November 2022, scoring in the second game on 10 November. In July 2024, he was called up to the Colombia under-20 team for a training micro-cycle. After not receiving a further call-up from Colombia, he accepted an invitation to join the Lebanon under-20 team the following month, making his debut in the 2025 AFC U-20 Asian Cup qualification, where he played the full match in a 3–2 loss to the United Arab Emirates.

=== Senior ===
Merheg received his first senior call-up to the Lebanon national team on 5 November 2024 for friendly matches against Thailand and Myanmar. He made his debut on 14 November 2024 aged 17 years and 344 days, coming on as an 82nd-minute substitute in a 0–0 draw against Thailand. Five days later, he scored his first international goals with a brace in a 3–2 victory over Myanmar. On 20 March 2025, Merheg scored another brace in a 4–0 friendly win against Timor-Leste, taking his tally to five in his first five appearances for Lebanon. He continued his scoring form in the 2027 Asian Cup qualifiers, netting his sixth goal in six games during a 5–0 win over Brunei five days later.

== Style of play ==
Merheg is a physical striker known for his aerial ability, link-up play, and ability to find goalscoring positions.

== Career statistics ==
=== Club ===
As of match played 29 August 2026

Appearances and goals by club, season and competition
Club	Season	League			National cup (Note: Includes Copa Colombia, Taça de Portugal)		League cup (Note: Includes Taça da Liga)		Continental		Total	
Club	Season	Division	Apps	Goals	Apps	Goals	Apps	Goals	Apps	Goals	Apps	Goals
Deportivo Pereira	2024	Categoría Primera A	3	0	2	0	—		—		5	0
Deportivo Pereira	2025	Categoría Primera A	25	5	4	3	—		—		29	8
Deportivo Pereira	Total		28	5	6	3	0	0	0	0	34	8
Braga B	2025–26	Liga 3	10	4	—		—		—		10	4
Alverca	2026–27	Primeira Liga	4	0	0	0	—		0	0	4	0
Career total			42	9	6	3	0	0	0	0	48	12

=== International ===
As of match played 17 November 2026

Appearances and goals by national team and year
National team	Year	Apps	Goals
Lebanon	2024	4	3
Lebanon	2025	8	4
Lebanon	2026	3	0
Total		15	7

Scores and results list Lebanon's goal tally first, score column indicates score after each Merheg goal.

List of international goals scored by Samy Merheg
No.	Date	Venue	Opponent	Score	Result	Competition
1	19 November 2024	Thuwunna Stadium, Yangon, Myanmar	Myanmar	2–2	3–2	Friendly
2	19 November 2024	Thuwunna Stadium, Yangon, Myanmar	Myanmar	3–2	3–2	Friendly
3	12 December 2024	Hamad bin Khalifa Stadium, Doha, Qatar	Kuwait	2–1	2–1	Friendly
4	20 March 2025	Al-Khor SC Stadium, Al Khor, Qatar	Timor-Leste	3–0	4–0	Friendly
5	20 March 2025	Al-Khor SC Stadium, Al Khor, Qatar	Timor-Leste	4–0	4–0	Friendly
6	25 March 2025	Saoud bin Abdulrahman Stadium, Al-Wakrah, Qatar	Brunei	2–0	5–0	2027 Asian Cup qualification
7	18 November 2025	Hassanal Bolkiah National Stadium, Bandar Seri Begawan, Brunei	Brunei	2–0	3–0	2027 Asian Cup qualification

== See also ==
- List of Lebanon international footballers born outside Lebanon
- List of association football families
