= Harlin Suárez =

Colombian footballer (born 1994)

Personal information
- Full name: Harlin José Suárez Torres
- Date of birth: 28 June 1994 (age 32)
- Place of birth: Arjona, Colombia
- Height: 1.71 m (5 ft 7 in)
- Position: Defensive midfielder

Team information
- Current team: Inter Palmira

Senior career*
Years	Team	Apps	(Gls)
2014	Tigres	28	(0)
2015–2016	Leones	70	(2)
2017	Atlético Bucaramanga	27	(1)
2018	Atlético Huila	21	(0)
2019	Once Caldas	18	(1)
2020	Alianza Petrolera	8	(0)
2021	Atlético Huila	39	(1)
2022	Deportivo Pereira	23	(0)
2023	KTP	0	(0)
2023	Narva Trans	35	(3)
2024	Cúcuta Deportivo	11	(0)
2024–2025	Al-Hudood	8	(1)
2025–	Inter Palmira	4	(0)
- * Club domestic league appearances and goals as of 18 August 2025

Harlin José Suárez Torres (born 28 June 1994) is a Colombian professional footballer who plays as a defensive midfielder for Inter Palmira.

== Career statistics ==
As of 18 August 2025

Appearances and goals by club, season and competition
Club	Season	League			National cup (Note: Includes Copa Colombia and Eesti Karikas)		Continental		Total	
Club	Season	Division	Apps	Goals	Apps	Goals	Apps	Goals	Apps	Goals
Tigres	2014	Categoría Primera B	28	0	7	0	–		35	0
Leones	2015	Categoría Primera B	34	1	3	0	–		37	1
Leones	2016	Categoría Primera B	36	1	4	0	–		40	1
Leones	Total		70	2	7	0	0	0	77	2
Atlético Bucaramanga	2017	Categoría Primera A	27	1	5	1	–		32	2
Atlético Huila	2018	Categoría Primera A	21	0	0	0	–		21	0
Once Caldas	2019	Categoría Primera A	18	1	2	0	2 (Note: Appearances in Copa Sudamericana)	0	22	1
Alianza Petrolera	2020	Categoría Primera A	8	0	0	0	–		8	0
Atlético Huila	2021	Categoría Primera B	19	0	0	0	–		19	0
Atlético Huila	2021	Categoría Primera A	20	1	0	0	–		20	1
Atlético Huila	Total		39	1	0	0	0	0	39	1
Deportivo Pereira	2022	Categoría Primera A	23	0	2	0	–		25	0
KTP	2023	Veikkausliiga	0	0	0	0	–		0	0
Narva Trans	2023	Meistriliiga	35	3	5	1	2 (Note: Appearances in UEFA Europa Conference League)	0	42	4
Cúcuta Deportivo	2024	Categoría Primera B	11	0	2	0	–		13	0
Al-Hudood	2024–25	Iraq Stars League	8	1	–		–		8	1
Inter Palmira	2025	Categoría Primera B	4	0	2	0	–		6	0
Career total			292	9	32	2	4	0	326	11
