= Héctor Cárdenas =

Colombian football manager

Personal information
- Full name: Héctor Fabio Cárdenas Berrío
- Date of birth: 28 August 1979 (age 47)
- Place of birth: Cali, Colombia

Managerial career
- Years: Team
- 2011–2014: Deportivo Cali (youth)
- 2012: Deportivo Cali (interim)
- 2014: Deportivo Cali
- 2015–2016: Deportivo Cali (youth)
- 2017: Deportivo Cali
- 2018–2022: Colombia U17
- 2022–2024: Colombia U20
- 2022: Colombia (interim)
- 2023–2024: Colombia U23
- 2024–2026: Inter Palmira

Héctor Fabio Cárdenas Berrío (born 28 August 1979) is a Colombian football manager.

== Career ==
Born in Cali, Cárdenas worked for the Valle del Cauca Department League and Boca Juniors de Cali before joining Deportivo Cali in 2011, as a youth coach. On 9 October 2012, he was named interim manager of the first team for the remainder of the season, after Julio Comesaña resigned.

Cárdenas returned to his previous role after the appointment of Leonel Álvarez, but was named manager of the club on 26 February 2014, after Álvarez was sacked. On 2 December 2014, Deportivo Cali announced that Cárdenas would not be the manager of the club for the ensuing campaign, and he subsequently returned to the youth setup.

On 13 March 2017, Cárdenas was again named manager of the first team in the place of Mario Yepes. On 17 October, however, he was himself dismissed.

On 30 May 2018, Cárdenas was appointed manager of the Colombia national under-17 team. He became the manager of the under-20s on 16 February 2022, being also named interim manager of the full side in May. On 27 June 2023, he was also appointed as manager of the national under-23 team, however, he was dismissed from the Colombian youth sides on 12 February 2024 following the poor performances of the under-23 side at the 2023 Pan American Games and the 2024 CONMEBOL Pre-Olympic Tournament.

On 14 August 2024, Cárdenas was announced as manager of Inter Palmira, in the Colombian second tier league Categoría Primera B. Despite qualifying the club for the final rounds of the league for three tournaments in a row, Cárdenas was dismissed on 8 August 2026.
