= Jown Cardona =

Colombian footballer (born 1995)

Personal information
- Full name: Jown Anderson Cardona Agudelo
- Date of birth: 9 January 1995 (age 31)
- Place of birth: Valle del Cauca, Colombia
- Height: 1.69 m (5 ft 7 in)
- Position: Midfielder

Team information
- Current team: Deportivo Pasto
- Number: 20

Youth career
- Deportivo Cali

Senior career*
Years	Team	Apps	(Gls)
2014–2018	Deportivo Cali	17	(1)
2015	→ Real San Andrés (loan)	6	(1)
2016	→ Cortuluá (loan)	43	(10)
2018–2019	Ceará	7	(0)
2019	Deportivo Pasto	22	(3)
2019–2021	León	7	(0)
2020–2021	→ Once Caldas (loan)	5	(0)
2021–2022	Guangzhou City	42	(8)
2023–2024	Deportivo Pasto	7	(0)
2024	Santa Fe	8	(0)
2026–	Inter Palmira	0	(0)
- * Club domestic league appearances and goals as of 26 November 2024

Jown Anderson Cardona Agudelo (born 9 January 1995) is a Colombian footballer who plays as a midfielder for Inter Palmira.

== Career statistics ==
As of match played 26 November 2024

Appearances and goals by club, season and competition
Club	Season	League			State League		National Cup		Continental		Other		Total	
Club	Season	Division	Apps	Goals	Apps	Goals	Apps	Goals	Apps	Goals	Apps	Goals	Apps	Goals
Deportivo Cali	2014	Categoría Primera A	1	0	—		3	0	—		—		4	0
Deportivo Cali	2017	Categoría Primera A	11	0	—		3	0	0	0	—		14	0
Deportivo Cali	2018	Categoría Primera A	6	1	—		0	0	0	0	—		6	1
Deportivo Cali	Total		18	1	0	0	6	0	0	0	—		24	1
Real San Andrés (loan)	2015	Categoría Primera A	6	1	—		3	0	—		—		9	0
Cortuluá (loan)	2016	Categoría Primera A	43	10	—		2	0	—		—		45	10
Ceará	2018	Série A	7	0	0	0	0	0	—		—		7	0
Deportivo Pasto	2019	Categoría Primera A	22	3	—		0	0	—		—		22	3
León	2019–20	Liga MX	7	0	—		0	0	2	0	—		9	0
Once Caldas (loan)	2020	Categoría Primera A	5	0	—		1	0	—		—		6	0
Guangzhou City	2021	Chinese Super League	19	7	—		1	0	—		—		20	7
Guangzhou City	2022	Chinese Super League	23	1	—		0	0	—		—		23	1
Guangzhou City	Total		42	8	—		1	0	—		—		43	8
Deportivo Pasto	2023	Categoría Primera A	7	0	—		2	0	—		—		9	0
Santa Fe	2024	Categoría Primera A	8	0	—		1	0	—		—		9	0
Career total			165	23	0	0	17	0	2	0	0	0	184	23
