= Leonardo Enciso =

Colombian footballer (born 1981)

Personal information
- Full name: Leonardo Enciso Montes
- Date of birth: 22 February 1981 (age 45)
- Place of birth: Pereira, Risaralda, Colombia
- Height: 1.70 m (5 ft 7 in)
- Position: Forward

Youth career
- América de Cali

Senior career*
Years	Team	Apps	(Gls)
1999–2000	América de Cali		
- FBC Melgar
2002–2005	Deportivo Pasto	49	(12)
2004	→ Deportivo Pereira (loan)		
2005	Trujillanos	4	(0)
2005	→ Real Cartagena (loan)	11	(3)
2006–2007	Real Cartagena		
2007	→ Pérez Zeledón (loan)	3	(0)

International career
2001	Colombia U20	8	(2)
2004	Colombia U23	3	(0)
- * Club domestic league appearances and goals

Leonardo Enciso Montes (born 22 February 1981) is a Colombian former footballer who played as a forward.

== Club career ==
Born in Pereira, Enciso represented the Risaralda Department in his youth, scoring twenty-six goals in national tournaments, and becoming the department's top scorer. He joined the academy of América de Cali, and went on to make his debut in the 1999 Categoría Primera A season, appearing in a 2–2 draw with Deportivo Pasto.

He later moved to Peru to join FBC Melgar, before returning to Colombia with Deportivo Pasto. He also played for Trujillanos in Venezuela and Real Cartagena in Colombia before ending his career with Costa Rican side Pérez Zeledón.

== International career ==
Enciso represented Colombia at under-20 level, featuring in the 2001 South American U-20 Championship and 2001 Toulon Tournament. He also played in the 2004 CONMEBOL Pre-Olympic Tournament for Colombia's under-23 side.

== Personal life ==
Enciso's sister is Juliana Enciso, a politician and former volleyball player, and his brother-in-law is Habib Merheg. His nephew, Juliana's son, is Lebanese international footballer, Samy Merheg.

Following his retirement, he founded a business, Enciso Limitada, which sells various forms of industrial equipment, road signs and fire fighting equipment.

== See also ==
- List of association football families
