= Internacional F.C. de Palmira =

Colombian football club

Inter Palmira
- Full name: Internacional Fútbol Club de Palmira
- Founded: 10 January 2024; 2 years ago
- Ground: Francisco Rivera Escobar
- Capacity: 15,300
- Owner: Ignacio Martán
- President: Oscar Arturo Martán
- Head coach: Nelson Flórez
- League: Categoría Primera B
- 2025: Primera B, 6th of 16
- Website: https://internacionalfc.co/
Home colours	Away colours	Third colours

Internacional Fútbol Club de Palmira, or Inter Palmira for short, is a Colombian professional football team based in Palmira, Valle del Cauca. It was founded on 10 January 2024 and plays in Categoría Primera B, the second-tier competition of Colombian football.

== History ==
Internacional F.C. was founded by the Martán family after rebranding the club Cortuluá and relocating it to Palmira, Valle del Cauca Department ahead of the 2024 season.

Cortuluá, which had been based in Tuluá, Valle del Cauca, started moving out of its hometown after their relegation from Categoría Primera A at the end of the 2022 season, citing the lack of financial support from successive local administrations. The club first moved to Yumbo, Valle del Cauca, where it played its matches in the 2023 Primera B tournament. Cortuluá originally planned to rebrand to Yumbo Industriales F.C. within six months, but this proposed change did not materialize.

At the end of 2023 Cortuluá requested another change of home stadium, planning to move to Palmira. The request was approved by DIMAYOR on 12 December 2023. The club was ultimately rebranded as Internacional F.C. de Palmira on 10 January 2024.

In their first season, Internacional were close to advance to the final stages in both tournaments of the 2024 Primera B season, but placed ninth in the Torneo I and tenth in the Torneo II. In the first tournament, they ended the first stage tied with Deportes Quindío in points, goal difference, goals scored, and away goals scored, but lost to them on away goals against. Internacional conceded 11 goals in their away games, but Deportes Quindío ended up claiming the last berth to the following stage of the competition as they only conceded 10 goals out of their stadium.

== Stadium ==
Internacional F.C. play their home matches at Estadio Francisco Rivera Escobar in Palmira, which has a capacity of 15,300 people. It was shared with Orsomarso, who played their home matches at this stadium until 2024.

== Players ==
=== First-team squad ===
As of 28 September 2026

Note: Flags indicate national team as defined under FIFA eligibility rules; some limited exceptions apply. Players may hold more than one non-FIFA nationality.

No.	Pos.	Nation	Player
1	GK	COL	Andrés Pérez
3	DF	COL	Alejandro Mejía
4	DF	COL	Yasser Ariza
5	MF	COL	Ronald Rodallega (on loan from Deportivo Cali)
6	MF	COL	Jhon Vélez (on loan from Junior)
7	FW	COL	Junior Mosquera
8	MF	COL	Carlos Franco
9	FW	COL	Ramiro Brochero
10	MF	COL	Jown Cardona
11	MF	COL	Kevin Padilla
13	DF	COL	Juan Camilo Angulo
14	FW	COL	David Orozco
15	MF	COL	Jhon Maturana
16	DF	COL	Brayan Ortiz

No.	Pos.	Nation	Player
18	MF	COL	Jhon Mosquera
19	MF	COL	Kener González
21	FW	COL	Jaider Moreno (on loan from Deportivo Cali)
22	GK	COL	William Cuesta
23	FW	COL	Rivaldo Correa (on loan from Cibao)
25	DF	COL	Andrés Álvarez
26	FW	ARG	Luciano Baggio
27	FW	COL	Fabián Castillo
29	DF	COL	Carlos Ramírez
30	DF	COL	Jaison Mina
31	DF	COL	Jhonatan Popó
32	MF	COL	Emerson Viveros
78	DF	COL	Manuel Caicedo
80	MF	COL	Harlin Suárez

=== Out on loan ===
Note: Flags indicate national team as defined under FIFA eligibility rules; some limited exceptions apply. Players may hold more than one non-FIFA nationality.

No.	Pos.	Nation	Player
—	DF	COL	Kalazán Suárez (at Deportivo Cali)

== Managers ==
- (Colombia) Carlos Hernández (March 2024 – August 2024)
- (Colombia) Héctor Cárdenas (August 2024 – August 2026)
- (Colombia) Nelson Flórez (August 2026 – present)
