= Fabián Ángel =

Colombian footballer (born 2001)

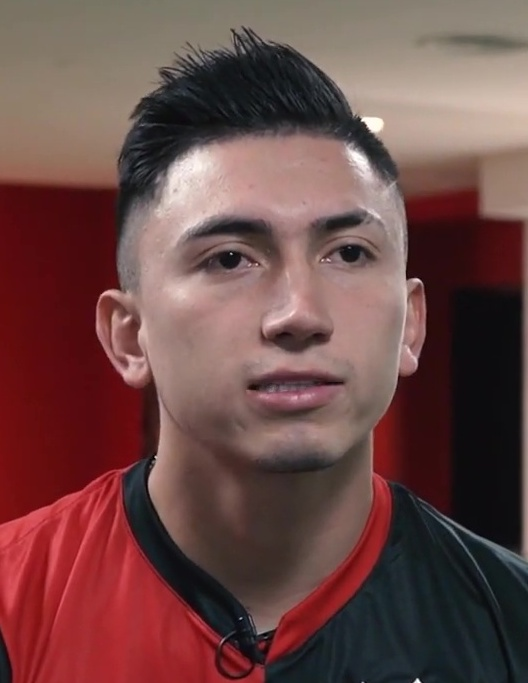
- Ángel in 2022

Personal information
- Full name: Fabián Steven Ángel Bernal
- Date of birth: 10 January 2001 (age 25)
- Place of birth: Sogamoso, Boyacá, Colombia
- Height: 1.75 m (5 ft 9 in)
- Position: Midfielder

Team information
- Current team: Atlético Junior
- Number: 80

Youth career
- Valle del Sol
- Barranquilla

Senior career*
Years	Team	Apps	(Gls)
2018–2019	Barranquilla	42	(0)
2019	→ Atlético Junior (loan)	0	(0)
2020–	Atlético Junior	81	(4)
2020	→ Barranquilla (loan)	6	(0)
2022–2023	→ Newell's Old Boys (loan)	1	(0)
2024	→ Deportivo Cali	24	(0)

International career
2017	Colombia U17	10	(1)
2019	Colombia U18		
2023	Colombia U23	4	(0)
- * Club domestic league appearances and goals as of 15 May 2025

Fabián Steven Ángel Bernal (born 10 January 2001) is a Colombian professional footballer who plays as a midfielder for Atlético Junior.

== Early life ==
Ángel was born in the small city of Sogamoso in the Boyacá Department of Colombia, to a father who played futsal for Saeta FSC and the Colombia national futsal team. As a child, his father would take him to play football in the Magdalena neighbourhood.

== Club career ==
=== Early career ===
Ángel began his career in Sogamoso, playing with local sides under the tutelage of coaches Nelson Castillo and Fernando López, where his performances earned him a place in the representative team of the Boyacá Department. He captained the provincial side for three years before travelling to Barranquilla in 2015 to trial with Atlético Junior. He eventually joined the academy of Atlético Junior's affiliate side, Barranquilla, and also represented the Atlántico Department.

=== Atlético Junior ===
==== 2019–2020: Initial loan and breakthrough ====
Having spent two seasons with Barranquilla, Ángel was loaned to parent club Atlético Junior in 2019, alongside teammate Stiwart Acuña, ahead of the 2019 Torneo Finalización. After one appearance in the Copa Colombia, Ángel joined the side permanently for the 2020 season, making his Categoría Primera A debut and a handful of appearances for the side across all competitions. He renewed his contract with the club in January 2021, signing on until 2023.

==== 2021–2022: Establishing first team football ====
He established himself in the first team during the 2021 season, and his performances reportedly drew interest from Argentine side River Plate. In an interview with Argentine radio show ¿Cómo te va? (How are you doing?), Ángel stated that he would "love to go to River". On 23 September 2021, during a game against Atlético Huila, both Ángel and teammate Willer Ditta appeared to snort an unknown substance on the pitch. Ángel explained on his Instagram account that the substance was a form of ammonia used to open the nostrils in order to breathe better. Atlético Junior issued a statement saying that, while Ángel and Ditta did not have permission from the medical staff to use the substance, it was not an illegal product, nor did it breach doping rules.

==== 2022: Loan to Newell's Old Boys ====
The following season, Ángel scored his first goal for Atlético Junior, opening the scoring in an eventual 4–0 win against Envigado in the Categoría Primera A on 1 May 2022. Just a month later, he moved to Argentina, signing with Argentine Primera División side Newell's Old Boys on a one-year loan deal with a purchase option, joining teammate Willer Ditta, who had also joined on a similar loan deal, in the process. Having made his debut in the 0–0 draw against Racing Club on 16 July, he would have to wait until 8 August to feature again, coming on as a late substitute for Guillermo Balzi in a 4–2 Copa Argentina win over Aldosivi. Two weeks later, he suffered what was diagnosed a bone bruise in his left knee by Newell's medical staff, after an injury in training. After being initially ruled out for five weeks, he had still not featured by the end of the 2022 season, with Newell's issuing a new diagnosis in November, stating that Ángel had suffered a sprained knee with advanced partial injury of the posterior cruciate ligament. He underwent surgery on his knee in December, keeping him out for eight months.

==== 2023: Return to Colombia for treatment ====
Having been ruled out of the entirety of the 2023 season by Newell's manager Gabriel Heinze, Ángel returned to Colombia for the surgery and rehabilitation. He criticised the medical staff at Newell's Old Boys for their misdiagnosis, stating that he had "never felt 100%" after the injury, and that he was not "undergoing adequate rehabilitation" during his time in Argentina. He denied reports that he had returned to Colombia without the permission of Newell's Old Boys, and clarified that the club had paid for his treatment. He also criticised the statement Newell's had released, which had claimed Ángel decided to undergo surgery with other professionals, claiming that his return to Colombia had been agreed by all three parties: himself, Atlético Junior and Newell's Old Boys.

Newell's Old Boys requested that Ángel be removed from their foreign players quota, with clubs in Argentina only being allowed six foreign players in the squad, and the Argentine Football Association accepted this request. Ángel posted an update in May 2023, announcing that the MRI scans he had undergone "showed constant improvements". Later the same month, in an interview with Barranquilla-based newspaper El Heraldo, he stated that Newell's Old Boys had yet to make a decision on the purchase option, and if he were to return to Atlético Junior, he would help them fight for the Colombian league title.

== International career ==
Ángel was called up to represent the Colombian under-17 side at the 2017 Bolivarian Games, where he starred in the final as Colombia beat Ecuador 5–4 in a penalty shoot-out after a 2–2 draw. Having also represented Colombia at under-18 level, Ángel was called up to the under-20 and senior squads without featuring.

== Career statistics ==
=== Club ===
As of 21 July 2023.

Appearances and goals by club, season and competition
Club	Season	League			Cup		Continental		Other		Total	
Club	Season	Division	Apps	Goals	Apps	Goals	Apps	Goals	Apps	Goals	Apps	Goals
Barranquilla	2018	Categoría Primera B	26	0	5 (Note: Appearances in the Copa Colombia)	0	0	0	0	0	31	0
Barranquilla	2019	Categoría Primera B	16	0	5	0	0	0	0	0	21	0
Barranquilla	Total		42	0	10	0	0	0	0	0	52	0
Atlético Junior (loan)	2019	Categoría Primera A	0	0	1	0	0	0	0	0	1	0
Atlético Junior	2020	Categoría Primera A	7	0	2	0	2 (Note: Appearances in the Copa Sudamericana)	0	0	0	11	0
Atlético Junior	2021	Categoría Primera A	32	0	0	0	4 (Note: Appearances in the Copa Libertadores)	0	0	0	36	0
Atlético Junior	2022	Categoría Primera A	11	1	1	0	3	0	0	0	15	1
Atlético Junior	2023	Categoría Primera A	0	0	0	0	0	0	0	0	0	0
Atlético Junior	Total		50	1	3	0	9	0	0	0	62	1
Barranquilla (loan)	2020	Categoría Primera B	6	0	0	0	0	0	0	0	6	0
Newell's Old Boys (loan)	2022	Argentine Primera División	1	0	1 (Note: Appearances in the Copa Argentina)	0	0	0	0	0	2	0
Newell's Old Boys (loan)	2023	Argentine Primera División	0	0	0	0	0	0	0	0	0	0
Newell's Old Boys (loan)	Total		1	0	1	0	0	0	0	0	2	0
Career total			99	1	15	0	9	0	0	0	123	1
