= Juan Samy Merheg =

Colombian politician

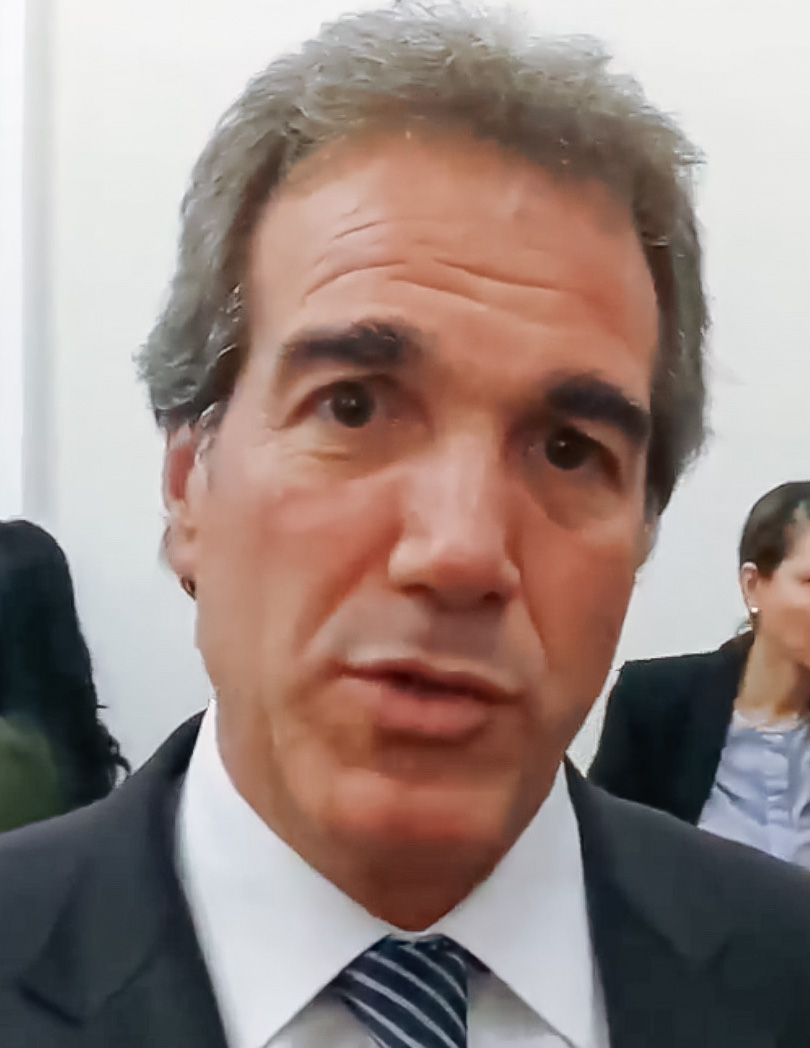
- Merheg in 2017

Senator of the Republic of Colombia
- Incumbent
- Assumed office July 20, 2010

Personal details
- Born: Juan Samy Merheg Marún; April 4, 1967 (age 59) Pereira, Colombia
- Party: Colombian Conservative Party
- Occupation: Politician

Juan Samy Merheg Marún (born April 4, 1967) is a Colombian politician who is Senator of the Republic of Colombia. He is the brother of former congressman Habib Merheg.

== Career ==
Merheg is considered one of the most important political bosses in the department. His party has traditionally governed with its former rival, the Liberal Party.

He was first elected to the Senate in the 2010 elections, replacing his brother, Habib Merheg, who had resigned in 2009 for being implicated in the parapolitics process. He was successively reelected in the 2014 elections and in the 2018 elections.

In the Senate, he is a member of the Fourth Commission. In 2018, he was one of the proponents of a bill to extend the presidential term so that it could be unified with that of governors and mayors. Although the bill obtained 67 votes in favor, it was shelved as it also obtained 55 against.

== Personal life ==
Merheg is of Lebanese descent from both parents. His brother, Habib Merheg, is also a politician. Habib's son, Samy Merheg, is a professional footballer.
