= Agustín Cano =

Colombian footballer (born 2001)

Personal information
- Full name: Agustín Cano Lotero
- Date of birth: 8 June 2001 (age 25)
- Place of birth: Medellín, Colombia
- Height: 1.86 m (6 ft 1 in)
- Position: Midfielder

Team information
- Current team: Atlético Nacional
- Number: 24

Youth career
- 2013—2020: Atlético Nacional

Senior career*
Years	Team	Apps	(Gls)
2020—	Atlético Nacional	2	(0)
- * Club domestic league appearances and goals as of 7 May 2021

Agustín Cano Lotero (born 8 June 2001) is a Colombian professional footballer who plays as a midfielder for Categoría Primera A club Atlético Nacional.

== Career ==
Born in Medellín, Augustín Cano began his career at Atlético Nacional, where he joined the youth setup at the age of 12. Cano was promoted to first team for the 2020 Categoría Primera A season. On 6 October 2020, Cano committed himself to the Atlético Nacional, signing a contract until 2023. Cano made his debut for the club on 29 November 2020, against América de Cali.

== Career statistics ==
As of 7 May 2021.

Club statistics
Club	Season	League			Cup		League Cup		Continental		Other		Total	
Club	Season	Division	Apps	Goals	Apps	Goals	Apps	Goals	Apps	Goals	Apps	Goals	Apps	Goals
Atlético Nacional	2020	Categoría Primera A	1	0	0	0	—		0	0	0	0	1	0
Atlético Nacional	2021	Categoría Primera A	1	0	0	0	—		0	0	0	0	1	0
Career total			2	0	0	0	—		0	0	0	0	2	0
