= Mateo Zuleta =

Colombian footballer

Personal information
- Full name: Mateo Zuleta García
- Date of birth: 7 June 2002 (age 24)
- Place of birth: Itagüí, Colombia
- Height: 1.70 m (5 ft 7 in)
- Position: Winger

Team information
- Current team: Once Caldas (on loan from Leones)
- Number: 28

Youth career
- Barrio San Fernando
- La Chalaca
- 2019: Total Soccer
- 2020: Real Santuario
- 2021: Independiente Medellín
- 2022: Leones

Senior career*
Years	Team	Apps	(Gls)
2023–	Leones	34	(13)
2024	→ Atlético Goianiense (loan)	15	(1)
2024	→ América de Cali (loan)	5	(0)
2025–	→ Once Caldas (loan)	38	(3)
- * Club domestic league appearances and goals as of 12 December 2025

Mateo Zuleta García (born 7 June 2002) is a Colombian footballer who plays as winger for Once Caldas, on loan from Leones.

== Career ==
Born in Itagüí, Zuleta played for several clubs as a youth before being promoted to the first team of Leones for the 2023 season. He made his senior debut on 13 February 2023, starting and scoring his team's third in a 3–0 Categoría Primera B away win over Deportes Quindío.

Zuleta finished his first senior year with 13 goals in 34 appearances, eight only in the Torneo II. On 11 January 2024, he was presented at Campeonato Brasileiro Série A side Atlético Goianiense on a one-year loan deal.

== Career statistics ==
As of 31 December 2023

Club	Season	League			Cup		Continental		State league		Other		Total	
Club	Season	Division	Apps	Goals	Apps	Goals	Apps	Goals	Apps	Goals	Apps	Goals	Apps	Goals
Leones	2023	Categoría Primera B	34	13	2	0	—		—		—		36	13
Atlético Goianiense (loan)	2024	Série A	0	0	0	0	—		0	0	—		0	0
Career total			34	13	2	0	0	0	0	0	0	0	36	13
