= Cristián Álvarez (footballer, born 1992) =

Argentine footballer

Personal information
- Full name: Cristián Marcelo Álvarez
- Date of birth: 28 September 1992 (age 34)
- Place of birth: Trenque Lauquen, Argentina
- Height: 1.75 m (5 ft 9 in)
- Position: Midfielder

Team information
- Current team: Cucuta Deportivo

Youth career
- –2012: Boca Juniors

Senior career*
Years	Team	Apps	(Gls)
2012–2017	Boca Juniors	5	(0)
2013–2014	→ All Boys (loan)	10	(0)
2014–2015	→ Antofagasta (loan)	16	(0)
2015–2016	→ Palestino (loan)	3	(0)
2017–2018	Cúcuta Deportivo	38	(12)
2018–2019	Villa Dálmine	9	(1)
2019	América de Cali	27	(3)
2020	Deportivo Pasto	14	(2)
2021	Deportivo Binacional	9	(0)
2021–2022	Nacional Potosí	54	(16)
2023–2024	Oriente Petrolero	19	(5)
2024-	Cucuta Deportivo		
- * Club domestic league appearances and goals as of 17 August 2023

Cristián Marcelo Álvarez (born 28 September 1992) is an Argentine footballer who plays as a midfielder for Colombian club Cucuta Deportivo.

== Honours ==
Boca Juniors

- Copa Argentina (1): 2011–12
