= BeSoccer =

Website about association football

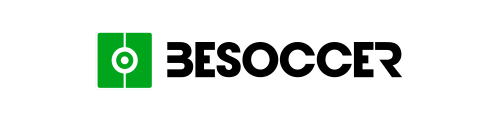
- Website type: soccer website, soccer app
- Available in: Spanish, English
- Founded: 1 July 2006
- Headquarters: Málaga, {{{location_country}}}
- Owner: Manuel Agustín Heredia
- Founder: Manuel Agustín Heredia
- Website: besoccer.com
- Commercial: No

BeSoccer is an association football website and database.

Established by Manuel Agustín Heredia in 2006 at Málaga, Spain, it provides users with statistics, results and news on soccer clubs and players of the main European leagues. It also offers information on several South American leagues and world cup qualifiers. It also offers a complete analysis of player data or any other aspect related to world soccer through the BeSoccer Pro tool.

Further, it has a mobile application for 60 countries, as well as the world's largest database with information on 2,000 competitions, 100,000 teams and 10 million matches.
