= Real Cundinamarca =

Colombian football club

- Full name: Real Cundinamarca
- Founded: 10 July 2023; 3 years ago as Real Soacha Cundinamarca; 24 January 2024; 2 years ago as Real Cundinamarca
- Ground: Municipal de Mosquera
- Capacity: 5,440
- President: Nicolás Baena
- Head coach: Diego Mazo
- League: Categoría Primera B
- 2025: Primera B, 4th of 16
- Website: www.realsc.co
Home colours	Away colours	Third colours

Real Cundinamarca, known from July 2023 to January 2024 as Real Soacha Cundinamarca, is a professional Colombian football team based in Mosquera, that plays in the Categoría Primera B, the second tier of Colombian professional football starting from 2023. Founded on 10 July 2023, they play their home games at the Estadio Municipal de Mosquera, moving there in 2026 after playing in Soacha and Bogotá in their first years of existence.

== History ==
Real Soacha Cundinamarca was founded by the owners of former Categoría Primera B club Valledupar F.C., who on 22 June 2023 voted to move the club from Valledupar to Soacha due to the lack of support from both the local government and private enterprises in the former city. The move was greenlit by the División Mayor del Fútbol Profesional Colombiano (Dimayor) at a General Assembly session of the entity held on 6 July 2023.

The club was officially presented by the local government of Soacha at a press conference held on 10 July 2023, and played its first match in the 2023 Categoría Primera B season on 23 July 2023, hosting Cortuluá in a game that ended in a scoreless draw. In its first participation in the Primera B, the 2023–II tournament, the team placed second from bottom with 14 points in 16 matches, only winning 2 of those games.

The electoral victory of Julián Sánchez as mayor of Soacha, who announced that financial support to Real Soacha Cundinamarca would be cut and it would be sent back to Valledupar starting from 1 January 2024, meant that the club was forced to leave Soacha at the end of 2023. On 24 January 2024, the rebranding of the club to Real Cundinamarca and its relocation to Bogotá was confirmed and approved at the General Assembly of Dimayor.

Starting from the 2024 season, the club has had consistent campaigns, reaching the semifinal stage of the Primera B championship for the first time in the second tournament of that season. In the following season, Real Cundinamarca reached a final series for the first time, losing to Cúcuta Deportivo on penalty kicks.

== Stadium ==
In 2023, the club played its home matches at Estadio Luis Carlos Galán Sarmiento in Soacha, which has a capacity of 7,000 people. According to the then mayor of Soacha, Juan Carlos Saldarriaga, a 4 billion COP (approximately US$ 977,000) investment had been made in order to enable the stadium to host professional football games. For 2024, they moved to Parque Estadio Olaya Herrera in Bogotá, with a capacity of 2,500 spectators.

Starting from 2026, the club relocated to Mosquera, Cundinamarca following the completion of the construction of the town's municipal stadium, which has a capacity of 5,440 spectators.

== Current squad ==
As of 12 October 2026

Note: Flags indicate national team as defined under FIFA eligibility rules; some limited exceptions apply. Players may hold more than one non-FIFA nationality.

No.	Pos.	Nation	Player
1	GK	COL	Mateo Valencia
2	DF	COL	Bayron Suaza
3	DF	COL	Alexis Estupiñán
4	DF	COL	Samuel Flórez
5	MF	COL	Agustín Cano
6	MF	COL	Juan David Hoyos
7	MF	COL	Yeiler Valencia (on loan from Once Caldas)
8	MF	COL	Carlos Gómez
9	FW	COL	Christian Negrete
10	FW	COL	Jhojan Amaya (on loan from Atlético Nacional)
11	MF	COL	Kaleth Zabala
12	GK	COL	Daniel Mosquera
13	DF	COL	Mateo Ortegón
14	FW	COL	Brayan Castro
15	DF	MEX	Jerónimo Rodríguez
16	MF	COL	Carlos Zambrano
17	FW	COL	Kleiton Cuéllar (on loan from Deportivo Cali)

No.	Pos.	Nation	Player
18	MF	COL	Brandon Quiñónez
19	FW	COL	Jhon Cortés
20	DF	COL	Onel Acosta
21	MF	COL	Jerónimo Alba
22	GK	COL	Edison Mosquera
23	DF	COL	Kevin Esterilla
24	MF	COL	Jesús Chinchía
25	MF	COL	Gilberto Saavedra
26	MF	COL	Juan Diego Fernández
27	DF	COL	Cristian Uribe (on loan from Atlético Nacional)
28	MF	COL	Carlos Ríos
29	FW	COL	Jackson Jaramillo
30	DF	COL	Pedro de Zubiría
31	FW	COL	Leonel Obregón
33	GK	COL	Juan David Lemus
40	GK	COL	James Giraldo

== Managers ==
- (Colombia) Julián Barragán (July 2023 – May 2024)
- (Colombia) Juan David Niño (May 2024 – December 2025)
- (Colombia) David Suárez (January 2026 – April 2026)
- (Colombia) Diego Mazo (May 2026 – Present)
