= Stiwart Acuña =

Colombian footballer (born 1999)

Personal information
- Full name: Stiwart Alejando Acuña López
- Date of birth: 6 February 1999 (age 27)
- Place of birth: Barranquilla, Colombia
- Height: 1.76 m (5 ft 9 in)
- Position: Right winger

Team information
- Current team: Junior
- Number: 19

Youth career
- 2013–2017: Barranquilla
- 2018: → Junior (loan)

Senior career*
Years	Team	Apps	(Gls)
2017–2025	Barranquilla	155	(37)
2018	→ Junior (loan)	1	(0)
2019	→ Junior (loan)	5	(0)
2022	→ Alianza Petrolera (loan)	5	(1)
2025–	Junior	2	(0)
- * Club domestic league appearances and goals as of 18:31, 23 August 2025 (UTC)

Stiwart Alejando Acuña López (born 6 February 1999) is a Colombian footballer who plays as a right winger for Categoría Primera B side Atlético Junior.

== Club career ==
=== Barranquilla ===
Started playing football at the age of 5 in a little school in El Bosque. He then went to Cartagena to play there before moving back to Barranquilla. Acuña arrived at Barranquilla in 2013.

In 2018, Acuña went to Atlético Junior on loan where he mostly played for the clubs U20s. However, he did participate in one game for the A-team, which also was his first game in the Categoría Primera A, on 12 February 2018 against Deportivo Pasto, replacing Sebastián Hernández in the 64th minute. Acuña returned to Barranquilla in the summer 2018. He made a total of 38 games and scored eight goals during the 2018 and 2019 seasons.

In the summer 2019, Acuña was once again loaned out to Atlético Junior, this time together with his teammate, Fabián Ángel, for the rest of the 2019 season. On 28 January 2022, Acuña joined Categoría Primera A club Alianza Petrolera on loan until the end of June 2022.

=== Return to Atlético Junior ===
In July 2025, Acuña transferred to his former club, Atlético Junior, the same club where he was on loan in both 2018 and 2019.

== Personal life ==
Stiwart Acuña is the nephew of former footballer, Emerson Acuña
