= Lucas Ríos =

Argentine footballer

Personal information
- Full name: Lucas Emanuel Ríos
- Date of birth: 8 March 1998 (age 28)
- Place of birth: Santa Fe, Argentina
- Height: 1.76 m (5 ft 9 in)
- Position: Midfielder

Team information
- Current team: Independiente Santa Fe (on loan from Cúcuta Deportivo)
- Number: 29

Youth career
- Unión Santa Fe

Senior career*
Years	Team	Apps	(Gls)
2019–2020	Unión Santa Fe	10	(0)
2020–2021	Real Pilar	28	(2)
2022–	Cúcuta Deportivo	62	(13)
2024	Once Caldas (loan)	18	(0)
2025–	Independiente Santa Fe (loan)	7	(0)
- * Club domestic league appearances and goals as of 16 May 2025

Lucas Ríos (born 8 March 1998) is an Argentine professional footballer who plays as a midfielder for Independiente Santa Fe, on loan from Cúcuta Deportivo.

== Career ==
Ríos' career began with Unión Santa Fe. He was promoted into their senior squad midway through the 2018–19 Primera División season, appearing on the bench for a fixture with River Plate away from home and subsequently making his professional bow as an eightieth-minute substitute for Diego Zabala in a 1–2 victory.

== Career statistics ==
As of 4 April 2025.

Club statistics
Club	Division	League			Cup		Continental		Total	
Club	Division	Season	Apps	Goals	Apps	Goals	Apps	Goals	Apps	Goals
Unión Santa Fe	Primera División	2018-19	8	0	5	0	0	0	13	0
Unión Santa Fe	Primera División	2019-20	2	0	0	0	0	0	2	0
Unión Santa Fe	Total		10	0	5	0	0	0	15	0
Real Pilar	Primera C Metropolitana	2020	7	0	-		-		7	0
Real Pilar	Primera C Metropolitana	2021	22	2	1	0	-		23	2
Real Pilar	Total		29	2	1	0	-		30	2
Cúcuta Deportivo	Categoría Primera B	2022	8	1	-		-		8	1
Cúcuta Deportivo	Categoría Primera B	2023	37	8	10	1	-		47	9
Cúcuta Deportivo	Categoría Primera B	2024	17	4	1	0	-		18	4
Cúcuta Deportivo	Total		62	13	11	1	-		73	14
Once Caldas	Categoría Primera A	2024	18	0	-		-		18	0
Independiente Santa Fe	Categoría Primera A	2025	7	0	-		2	0	9	0
Career total			126	15	17	1	2	0	145	16
