= Barranquilla F.C. =

Colombian football club

- Full name: Barranquilla Fútbol Club
- Nickname: Los Rojos de Curramba (The Reds from Curramba)
- Founded: 8 April 2005; 21 years ago
- Ground: Romelio Martínez
- Capacity: 11,000
- Owner: Atlético Junior
- President: Ernesto Herrera Díaz
- Head coach: Dayron Pérez
- League: Categoría Primera B
- 2025: Primera B, 16th of 16
- Website: www.barranquillafc.com
Home colours	Away colours

Barranquilla Fútbol Club is a professional Colombian football team based in Barranquilla, that currently plays in the Categoría Primera B. They play their home games at the Estadio Romelio Martínez.

== History ==
Barranquilla F.C. was founded on 8 April 2005 by a group of businessmen led by Arturo Char who considering that Barranquilla did not have a team in the Primera B, decided to give the city a new alternative. The club became a Dimayor member by purchasing the membership rights that formerly belonged to Johann and entered the Categoría Primera B championship immediately afterwards.

Although Barranquilla F.C. has not won any titles in the Primera B, the club is best known for being a feeder team for top tier club Atlético Junior, which is also owned by the Char family. Barranquilla F.C. serves the role of developing and providing playing experience to young players, with talented prospects being later promoted to the main squad of parent club Junior. It has been the starting point for players such as Carlos Bacca, Teófilo Gutiérrez and Luis Díaz, who were promoted to Junior and subsequently continued their careers abroad.

== Stadium ==
Barranquilla FC uses Romelio Martínez Stadium for their home matches, which has a capacity of 11,000 spectators.

== Squad ==
As of 24 September 2026

Note: Flags indicate national team as defined under FIFA eligibility rules; some limited exceptions apply. Players may hold more than one non-FIFA nationality.

No.	Pos.	Nation	Player
1	GK	COL	Sebastián Guerra
2	DF	COL	Yaiker Mora
3	DF	COL	Omar Cassiani
4	DF	COL	Edmilson Herazo
5	FW	COL	Alexander Licona
6	MF	COL	Sebastián Caballero
7	FW	COL	Darwin Torres
8	MF	COL	Mohamed Bolívar
9	FW	COL	Breiner Pino
10	MF	COL	Javier Ortiz
11	FW	COL	Jackie Muñoz
13	FW	COL	Niull Vergara
14	DF	COL	William Mosquera
15	MF	COL	Sebastián Borja
16	MF	COL	Miguel Agámez (on loan from Junior)
17	FW	COL	Yesid García
18	MF	COL	Jhoynner Lozano

No.	Pos.	Nation	Player
19	MF	COL	Cristian Peñate
20	DF	COL	Jhon Cortez
21	MF	COL	Alberto Orozco
23	MF	COL	Phillipe Oviedo
25	MF	COL	Aldair Pérez
26	DF	COL	Yeferson Moreno
27	DF	COL	Neymar Uribe (on loan from Envigado)
28	MF	COL	Ebaldo Pérez
29	DF	COL	Carlos Olmos (on loan from Junior)
30	MF	COL	Luis Gómez
31	MF	COL	Diego Mendoza (on loan from Junior)
32	MF	COL	Johan Chaparro
33	GK	COL	Alex Chaverra
34	FW	COL	Orlan Villeros
35	DF	COL	Alexander Riascos
36	DF	COL	Jhon Navia

== Managers ==
- (Colombia) Fernel Díaz (2005–2006)
- (Colombia) David Pinillos (2006–2008)
- (Colombia) Álex de Alba (2009–2010)
- (Colombia) Luis Grau (July 2011 – September 2012)
- (Colombia) Richard Garcés (September 2012 – July 2013)
- (Colombia) Arturo Reyes (July 2013 – May 2017)
- (Colombia) Roberto Peñaloza (June 2017 – June 2019)
- (Colombia) Evert Salas (July 2019 – December 2019)
- (Colombia) Roberto Peñaloza (December 2019 – May 2022)
- (Colombia) Arturo Reyes (May 2022 – November 2022)
- (Colombia) Nelson Flórez (November 2022 – March 2025)
- (Colombia) Grigori Méndez (March 2025 – July 2025)
- (Colombia) Dayron Pérez (July 2025 – Present)

== Affiliated clubs ==
- (Colombia) Junior
