= 2008 Atlético Nacional season =

Atlético Nacional
2008 season
- Chairman: (Colombia) Víctor Marulanda
- Manager: (Argentina) Oscar Quintabani (Colombia) Víctor Aristizábal (Colombia) Gabriel Gómez (Colombia) José Santa
- Copa Mustang I 2008: 14th
- Copa Mustang II 2008: 3rd
- Copa Colombia 2008: Semifinals
- 2008 Copa Libertadores: Round of 16
- Top goalscorer: League: Sergio Galvan Rey (7); Giovanni Moreno (7); All: Giovanni Moreno (17)
- Highest home attendance: 41,237 vs Independiente Medellín (November 27, 2008)
- Lowest home attendance: 400 vs Deportivo Pereira (March 12, 2008)

The 2008 Atlético Nacional season was the club's 61st season since being founded in 1948. Nacional played in the 2008 Copa Libertadores since they won the Copa Mustang consecutively in the previous season (2007), making them the first team in Colombia to achieve this goal since the introduction of the new Copa Mustang format. Oscar Quintabani was the club's manager for the second year in a row. The team roster was almost the same as last year's.

== Team Kit ==
This year Atlético Nacional will be changing manufacturers since their contract with Umbro expired; this year they will be featuring Marathon Sports as their new manufacturing sponsor. However, Postobón is still going to be their main shirt sponsor, making this their ninth year sponsoring the club.

Supplier: Marathon Sports
Sponsor(s): Postobón

Home	Away	Third

== Team roster ==
=== Copa Mustang-I ===
As of January 18, 2008

Note: Flags indicate national team as defined under FIFA eligibility rules; some limited exceptions apply. Players may hold more than one non-FIFA nationality.

No.	Pos.	Nation	Player
1	GK	(Colombia) COL	David Ospina Ramírez
2	DF	(Colombia) COL	Humberto Antonio Mendoza
3	DF	(Colombia) COL	Walter José Moreno
4	MF	(Colombia) COL	Harold Martínez
5	DF	(Colombia) COL	Oscar Passo
6	DF	(Colombia) COL	Camilo Pérez
7	FW	(Colombia) COL	León Darío Muñoz
8	MF	(Colombia) COL	Víctor Ibarbo
10	MF	(Chile) CHI	Francisco Arrué
11	FW	(Colombia) COL	Elkin Murillo
12	GK	(Colombia) COL	Carlos Barahona Angulo
13	MF	(Colombia) COL	José Amaya
14	FW	(Colombia) COL	Carmelo Valencia

No.	Pos.	Nation	Player
15	DF	(Colombia) COL	Carlos Díaz
16	MF	(Colombia) COL	Felipe Chara
18	DF	(Colombia) COL	Juan Zúñiga
19	FW	(Argentina) ARG	Sergio Galván Rey
20	DF	(Colombia) COL	Julián Estiven Vélez
21	DF	(Colombia) COL	Marlon Piedrahita
22	MF	(Colombia) COL	David Córdoba
23	DF	(Colombia) COL	Jimmy Bermúdez
24	MF	(Colombia) COL	Diego Toro
25	GK	(Colombia) COL	Juan Carlos Patino
30	FW	(Paraguay) PAR	Carlos Villagra
31	MF	(Chile) CHI	Fernando Martel

=== Reserve & Youth Squad ===
Note: Flags indicate national team as defined under FIFA eligibility rules; some limited exceptions apply. Players may hold more than one non-FIFA nationality.

No.	Pos.	Nation	Player
--	DF	(Colombia) COL	Juan Carlos Mosquera
--	DF	(Colombia) COL	Julián Andrés Díaz
--	DF	(Colombia) COL	Davison Monsalve
--	MF	(Colombia) COL	Juan Carlos Ramírez
--	MF	(Colombia) COL	Santiago Ceferino
--	MF	(Colombia) COL	Jhonatan Cueto

No.	Pos.	Nation	Player
--	MF	(Colombia) COL	Jhon Edison Parra
--	FW	(Colombia) COL	Jefferson Angulo
--	FW	(Colombia) COL	José Novelio Romaña
--	FW	(Colombia) COL	Yeison Javier Devoz
--	FW	(Colombia) COL	Daniel Arango
--	FW	(Brazil) BRA	John Cèiler

=== Starting 11 Copa Mustang 2008-I ===
No.	Pos.	Nat.	Name	MS	Notes
1	GK	(Colombia)	D. Ospina	16	
18	RB	(Colombia)	J. Zúñiga	14	
3	CB	(Colombia)	W. Moreno	11	
2	CB	(Colombia)	H. Mendoza	15	
20	LB	(Colombia)	J. Vélez	10	
13	DM	(Colombia)	J. Amaya	12	
24	CM	(Colombia)	D. Toro	14	
10	CM	(Chile)	F. Arrué	12	
30	RW	(Paraguay)	C. Villagra	14	
19	LW	(Argentina)	Galván Rey	15	
14	FW	(Colombia)	C. Valencia	13	

Last updated: 2008-12-26
Source: Squad stats and Start formations.
Only competitive matches.
Using the most used start formation.
Ordered by position on pitch (from back right to front left).

=== Copa Mustang-II ===
As of May 24, 2008

Note: Flags indicate national team as defined under FIFA eligibility rules; some limited exceptions apply. Players may hold more than one non-FIFA nationality.

No.	Pos.	Nation	Player
1	GK	(Colombia) COL	Eduardo Blandón
2	DF	(Colombia) COL	Humberto Antonio Mendoza (Captain)
3	DF	(Colombia) COL	Walter José Moreno
4	MF	(Colombia) COL	Harold Martínez
5	DF	(Colombia) COL	Oscar Passo
6	FW	(Colombia) COL	Jefferson Angulo
7	FW	(Colombia) COL	Carmelo Valencia
8	MF	(Colombia) COL	Jhon Charría
10	MF	(Colombia) COL	Giovanni Moreno
11	FW	(Colombia) COL	León Darío Muñoz
12	GK	(Colombia) COL	Carlos Barahona Angulo
13	MF	(Colombia) COL	José Amaya
14	MF	(Colombia) COL	Jairo Palomino
15	DF	(Colombia) COL	Carlos Díaz

No.	Pos.	Nation	Player
16	MF	(Colombia) COL	Felipe Chara
17	FW	(Colombia) COL	Carlos Rentería
19	FW	(Argentina) ARG	Sergio Galván Rey (vice-captain)
20	DF	(Colombia) COL	Julián Estiven Vélez
21	DF	(Colombia) COL	Marlon Piedrahita
22	MF	(Colombia) COL	David Córdoba
23	DF	(Colombia) COL	Jimmy Bermúdez
24	MF	(Colombia) COL	Diego Toro
30	FW	(Paraguay) PAR	Carlos Villagra
--	DF	(Colombia) COL	Juan Carlos Mosquera
—	MF	(Colombia) COL	Victor Ibarbo
--	MF	(Colombia) COL	Cristian Correa
--	FW	(Colombia) COL	Luis Perea

=== Reserve and youth squad ===
Note: Flags indicate national team as defined under FIFA eligibility rules; some limited exceptions apply. Players may hold more than one non-FIFA nationality.

No.	Pos.	Nation	Player
--	GK	(Colombia) COL	Christian Vargas
--	DF	(Colombia) COL	Julián Andrés Díaz
--	DF	(Colombia) COL	Juan Pulgarín
--	DF	(Colombia) COL	Jair Enrique Iglesias
--	DF	(Colombia) COL	Juan Arboleda
--	MF	(Colombia) COL	Santiago Ceferino
--	MF	(Colombia) COL	Jhonatan Cueto

No.	Pos.	Nation	Player
--	MF	(Colombia) COL	Jhon Edison Parra
--	MF	(Colombia) COL	Luis Londoño
--	FW	(Colombia) COL	José Novelio Romaña
--	FW	(Colombia) COL	Yeison Javier Devoz
--	FW	(Colombia) COL	Daniel Arango
--	FW	(Brazil) BRA	John Cèiler
--	FW	(Colombia) COL	Juan González

=== Starting 11 Copa Mustang 2008-II ===
No.	Pos.	Nat.	Name	MS	Notes
1	GK	(Colombia)	E. Blandón	23	
21	RB	(Colombia)	M. Piedrahita	18	
2	CB	(Colombia)	H. Mendoza	22	
3	CB	(Colombia)	W. Moreno	17	
20	LB	(Colombia)	J. Vélez	14	
13	DM	(Colombia)	J. Amaya	19	
24	RM	(Colombia)	D. Toro	15	
14	LM	(Colombia)	J. Palominio	17	
10	AM	(Colombia)	G. Moreno	21	
19	FW	(Argentina)	Galván Rey	19	
18	FW	(Colombia)	L. Perea	16	

Last updated: 2008-12-26
Source: Squad stats and Start formations.
Only competitive matches.
Using the most used start formation.
Ordered by position on pitch (from back right to front left).

== Transfers ==
In:

- David Córdoba From Cúcuta Deportivo
- Juan Carlos Ramirez From Santa Fe
- Walter José Moreno From Cúcuta Deportivo
- Carlos Villagra From Millonarios
- Francisco Arrué From Universidad de Chile
- Eduardo Blandón From Millonarios
- Giovanni Moreno From Envigado Fútbol Club
- Jairo Palomino From Envigado Fútbol Club
- Jhon Charría From Deportes Tolima
- Carlos Rentería From Atlético Huila

Out:

- Víctor Aristizábal Retired
- Henry Rojas To Huila
- Oscar Echeverry To New York Red Bulls
- Andres David Saldarriaga To Cúcuta Deportivo
- William Zapata To Cúcuta Deportivo
- Ivan Hurtado To (Ecuador) Barcelona SC
- Aldo Ramírez To (Mexico) Monarcas Morelia
- David Ospina Ramírez to (France) OGC Nice
- Camilo Perez to Envigado Fútbol Club
- Juan Camilo Zuñiga To (Italy) AC Siena

== All Competitions ==
Competition	Final Position/Round	First Match	Last Match
Copa Colombia	Third Phase	March 12, 2008	October 1, 2008
Copa Mustang-I	14th	February 2, 2008	May 18, 2008
Copa Libertadores	Round of 16	February 27, 2008	May 7, 2008
Copa Mustang-II	3rd/Group Stage	July 19, 2008	December 14, 2008

== Statistics ==
=== Appearances and goals ===
Last updated on 30 Nov 2008.

No.	Pos	Nat	Player	Total		Copa Mustang 2008-II		Copa Mustang 2008-I		Copa Colombia 2008		2008 Copa Libertadores	
No.	Pos	Nat	Player	Apps	Goals	Apps	Goals	Apps	Goals	Apps	Goals	Apps	Goals
1	GK	(Colombia) COL	Eduardo Blandón	33	0	23	0	10	0	0	0	0	0
2	DF	(Colombia) COL	Humberto Antonio Mendoza	44	3	22	1	15	2	0	0	7	0
3	DF	(Colombia) COL	Walter José Moreno	34	2	17	1	11	1	0	0	6	0
4	MF	(Colombia) COL	Harold Martinez	22	0	11	0	8	0	0	0	3	0
5	DF	(Colombia) COL	Oscar Passo	0	0	0	0	0	0	0	0	0	0
6	FW	(Colombia) COL	Cristian Correa	17	1	12	0	0	0	5	1	0	0
7	FW	(Colombia) COL	Carmelo Valencia	23	2	6	0	13	1	0	0	4	1
8	MF	(Colombia) COL	Jhon Charría	23	6	12	0	11	6	0	0	0	0
10	MF	(Colombia) COL	Giovanni Moreno	43	17	21	7	22	10	0	0	0	0
11	FW	(Colombia) COL	León Darío Muñoz	20	1	12	0	5	1	0	0	3	0
12	GK	(Colombia) COL	Carlos Barahona Angulo	8	0	1	0	2	0	3	0	2	0
13	MF	(Colombia) COL	José Amaya	38	0	19	0	12	0	0	0	7	0
14	MF	(Colombia) COL	Jairo Palomino	39	1	17	0	22	1	0	0	0	0
15	DF	(Colombia) COL	Carlos Díaz	18	0	11	0	5	0	0	0	2	0
16	MF	(Colombia) COL	Felipe Chara	19	0	5	0	10	0	0	0	4	0
17	FW	(Colombia) COL	Carlos Rentería	32	14	13	2	16	10	3	2	0	0
18	FW	(Colombia) COL	Luis Perea	19	7	16	5	0	0	3	2	0	0
19	FW	(Argentina) ARG	Sergio Galván Rey	42	11	19	7	15	2	0	0	8	2
20	DF	(Colombia) COL	Julián Estiven Vélez	32	0	14	0	10	0	1	0	7	0
21	DF	(Colombia) COL	Marlon Piedrahita	30	0	18	0	6	0	2	0	4	0
22	MF	(Colombia) COL	David Córdoba	31	3	11	1	13	0	0	0	7	2
23	DF	(Colombia) COL	Jimmy Bermúdez	6	0	0	0	2	0	4	0	0	0
24	MF	(Colombia) COL	Diego Toro	35	0	15	0	14	0	0	0	6	0
30	FW	(Paraguay) PAR	Carlos Villagra	24	7	4	0	14	4	0	0	6	3
	MF	(Colombia) COL	Juan Carlos Mosquera	9	0	7	0	0	0	2	0	0	0
	FW	(Colombia) COL	Jefferson Angulo	20	4	14	0	1	0	5	4	0	0
	FW	(Colombia) COL	Yeison Javier Devoz	15	5	4	0	4	0	7	5	0	0
	MF	(Colombia) COL	Juan Arboleda	3	0	3	0	0	0	0	0	0	0
	FW	(Colombia) COL	Daniel Arango	9	1	4	0	0	0	5	1	0	0
	MF	(Colombia) COL	Victor Ibarbo	18	0	5	0	11	0	2	0	0	0
	GK	(Colombia) COL	David Ospina Ramírez	23	0	0	0	16	0	0	0	7	0
	MF	(Colombia) COL	Julián Andrés Díaz	3	0	0	0	3	0	0	0	0	0
	MF	(Colombia) COL	Davison Monsalve	3	0	0	0	1	0	2	0	0	0
	DF	(Colombia) COL	Juan Zúñiga	21	2	0	0	14	2	0	0	7	0
	MF	(Chile) CHI	Fernando Martel	11	2	0	0	7	2	0	0	4	0
	MF	(Colombia) COL	Juan Carlos Ramírez	5	0	0	0	3	0	1	0	1	0
	MF	(Colombia) COL	Jhonatan Cueto	6	0	0	0	1	0	5	0	0	0
	FW	(Colombia) COL	Juan Gonzalez	4	0	0	0	2	0	2	0	0	0
	FW	(Chile) CHI	Francisco Arrué	17	1	0	0	12	0	0	0	5	1
	FW	(Colombia) COL	Elkin Murillo	16	0	0	0	10	0	1	0	5	0
	MF	(Colombia) COL	Luis Londoño	5	0	0	0	0	0	5	0	0	0
	DF	(Colombia) COL	Jair Enrique Iglesias	4	0	0	0	0	0	4	0	0	0
	DF	(Colombia) COL	Juan Pulgarín	5	1	0	0	0	0	5	1	0	0
	MF	(Colombia) COL	Santiago Ceferino	3	0	0	0	0	0	3	0	0	0
	GK	(Colombia) COL	Christian Vargas	1	0	0	0	0	0	1	0	0	0
	GK	(Colombia) COL	Juan Carlos Patino	1	0	0	0	0	0	1	0	0	0
	FW	(Colombia) COL	José Novelio Romaña	1	1	0	0	0	0	1	1	0	0

== Copa Mustang ==
=== Copa Mustang 2008-I ===
The Copa Mustang 2008-I began on February 2 and ended on May 18. Atlético Nacional was a firm candidate to win the championship after winning both Colombian championships last year, but eventually had an underwhelming campaign, finishing 14th and missing out on the playoffs.

=== Results by round ===
Round	1	2	3	4	5	6	7	8	9	10	11	12	13	14	15	16	17	18
Ground	H	A	H	A	H	A	H	A	A	H	A	H	A	H	H	A	H	A
Result	L	L	W	L	W	L	L	W	L	D	L	W	L	W	W	W	L	L
Position	15	17	12	14	10	13	17	14	16	15	16	15	16	15	10	7	11	14

A = Away; H = Home; W = Win; D = Draw; L = Loss

=== League table ===
Pos	Team	Pts	GP	W	D	L	GF	GA	Dif
12.	Atletico Junior	24	18	7	3	8	21	23	-2
13.	Atlético Huila	23	18	5	8	5	25	25	0
14.	Atlético Nacional	22	18	7	1	10	16	19	-3
15.	Once Caldas	19	18	5	4	9	20	28	-8
16.	Deportivo Pasto	19	18	5	4	9	15	24	-9

==== Fixtures ====
February 2, 2008

Atlético Nacional	0 – 1	Santa Fe
		Preciado 9'

Estadio Atanasio Girardot, Medellín
Attendance: 18,000

February 10, 2008

Once Caldas	1 – 0	Atlético Nacional
Fano 90'

Estadio Palogrande, Manizales
Attendance: 12,000
Referee: Hector Parra, (COL)

February 15, 2008

Atlético Nacional	3 – 0	Atlético Bucaramanga
Galvan Rey 6' 88'; Muñoz 8'

Estadio Atanasio Girardot, Medellín
Attendance: 14,832 Referee: Hernan Berrio, (COL)

February 21, 2008

Envigado FC	1 – 0	Atlético Nacional
Moreno 48'

Estadio Polideportivo Sur, Envigado
Attendance: 5,000 Referee: Jose Luis Nino, (COL)

February 23, 2008

Atlético Nacional	1 – 0	Independiente Medellín
Zuniga 10'

Estadio Atanasio Girardot, Medellín
Attendance: 32,000

March 1, 2008

Deportivo Cali	2 – 1	Atlético Nacional
Rodriguez 15' 21'		Mendoza 90'

Pascual Guerrero, Cali
Attendance: 28,000 Referee: Francisco Penuela, (COL)

March 9, 2008

Atlético Nacional	0 – 1	La Equidad
		Morcillo 85'

Estadio Atanasio Girardot, Medellín
Attendance: 14,000

March 16, 2008

Deportes Tolima	1 – 2	Atlético Nacional
Oliveira 45'		Valencia 25'; Mendoza 63'

Estadio Manuel Murillo Toro, Ibagué
Attendance: 12,500

March 23, 2008

Independiente Medellín	2 – 0	Atlético Nacional
Álvarez 35'; Madera 70'

Estadio Atanasio Girardot, Medellín
Attendance: 26,452

March 29, 2008

Atlético Nacional	1 – 1	Millonarios
Zuñiga 90'		Carreño 72'

Estadio Atanasio Girardot, Medellín
Attendance: 15,171

April 2, 2008

Deportivo Pereira	1 – 0	Atlético Nacional
Peralta 64'

Estadio Hernán Ramírez Villegas, Pereira
Attendance: 18,000

April 6, 2008

Atlético Nacional	3 – 1	Cúcuta Deportivo
Villagra 1' 15' 28'		Henry 23'

Estadio Atanasio Girardot
Attendance: 10,536

April 13, 2008

Junior	3 – 0	Atlético Nacional
Díaz 10' 35'; Palacio 64'

Estadio Metropolitano, Barranquilla
Attendance: 17,385

April 20, 2008

Atlético Nacional	1 – 0	Deportes Quindío
Moreno 87'

Estadio Atanasio Girardot, Medellín
Attendance: 8,278

April 27, 2008

Atlético Nacional	3 – 2	América de Cali
Muñoz 29'; Villagra 57'; Martel 76'		Arrechea 36'; Tejada 38'

Estadio Atanasio Girardot, Medellín
Attendance: 21,923

May 4, 2008

Deportivo Pasto	0 – 1	Atlético Nacional
		Villagra 48'

Estadio Departamental Libertad, Pasto
Attendance: 15,000

May 10, 2008

Atlético Nacional	0 – 1	Boyacá Chicó
		Palacios 20'

Estadio Atanasio Girardot, Medellín
Attendance: 19,776

May 18, 2008

Atlético Huila	1 – 0	Atlético Nacional
Aranda 90+3'

Estadio Guillermo Plazas Alcid, Neiva
Attendance: 10,000

=== Copa Mustang 2008-II ===
The expectations for this season were high, since Nacional had a poor campaign in the previous Copa Mustang tournament. At the beginning of the 2008-II Copa Mustang Nacional was not as successful as it was thought they were going to be; mainly due to many changes in the squad, and this was highlighted by a 5-0 loss against Santa Fe. The club struggled to look for a place in the top 8 during the first half of the tournament. In the other half the club was slightly getting back to shape by making the top 8 on five occasions, and it won its last three games, leading into a 3rd place finish in the last game of the tournament and qualifying to the Quadrangular Semifinals. In the quadrangular, Nacional finished last, without having a single win, and in its closing game against La Equidad at home, the club lost 4-1; only about 10,000 fans showed up to the game to see them lose on their 2008 season final game.

=== Results by round ===
Round	1	2	3	4	5	6	7	8	9	10	11	12	13	14	15	16	17	18
Ground	A	H	A	H	A	H	A	H	H	A	H	A	H	A	A	H	A	H
Result	L	W	D	L	W	D	L	W	L	D	L	W	W	W	L	W	W	W
Position	18	14	13	16	8	10	12	8	10	12	14	12	11	7	10	9	5	3

A = Away; H = Home; W = Win; D = Draw; L = Loss

==== Fixtures ====
July 19, 2008

Santa Fe	5 – 0	Atlético Nacional
Mosquera 5' 69'; Neculman 41' 61'; Anchico 85'

Estadio El Campín, Bogotá
Attendance: 33,260

July 26, 2008

Atlético Nacional	2 – 0	Once Caldas
Moreno 90'; Rentería 85'

Estadio Atanasio Girardot, Medellín
Attendance: 20,366
Referee: Adalberto Rincón, (COL)

August 3, 2008

Atlético Bucaramanga	1 – 1	Atlético Nacional
Cárdenas 56'		Moreno 18'

Estadio Alfonso Lopez, Bucaramanga
Attendance: 5,000 Referee: Héctor Parra, (COL)

August 9, 2008

Atlético Nacional	1 – 2	Envigado FC
Galván Rey 80'		Serna 39'; González 56'

Estadio Atanasio Girardot, Medellín
Attendance: 12,969 Referee: Henry Barón, (COL)

August 16, 2008

Independiente Medellín	0 – 1	Atlético Nacional
		Mendoza 45'

Estadio Atanasio Girardot, Medellín
Attendance: 18,051

August 23, 2008

Atlético Nacional	1 – 1	Deportivo Cali
Galván Rey 72'		Montero 36'

Estadio Atanasio Girardot, Medellín
Attendance: 10,120 Referee: Imer Machado, (COL)

August 30, 2008

La Equidad	1 – 0	Atlético Nacional
Motta 24'

Estadio Metropolitano de Techo, Bogotá
Attendance: 5,000

September 14, 2008

Atlético Nacional	2 – 1	Deportes Tolima
Perea 38'; Córdoba 85'		Marangoni 31'

Estadio Atanasio Girardot, Medellín
Attendance: 9,723

September 21, 2008

Atlético Nacional	1 – 2	Independiente Medellín
Galván Rey 75'		Martínez 47'; Pérez 72'

Estadio Atanasio Girardot, Medellín
Attendance: 23,664

September 24, 2008

Millonarios	0 – 0	Atlético Nacional

Estadio El Campín, Bogotá
Attendance: 40,000

September 28, 2008

Atlético Nacional	0 – 1	Deportivo Pereira
		Medina 30'

Estadio Atanasio Girardot, Medellín
Attendance: 24,574

October 5, 2008

Cúcuta Deportivo	0 – 1	Atlético Nacional
		Moreno 10'

Estadio General Santander, Cúcuta
Attendance: 25,000

October 19, 2008

Atlético Nacional	2 – 1	Junior
Moreno 67'; Galván Rey 83'		Hernández 28'

Estadio Atanasio Girardot, Medellín
Attendance: 15,562

October 23, 2008

Deportes Quindío	0 – 3	Atlético Nacional
		Moreno 20' 80'; Galván Rey 90+2'

Estadio Centenario, Armenia

October 26, 2008

América de Cali	3 – 0	Atlético Nacional
Armero 30'; González 34'; Cortés 86'

Estadio Olímpico Pascual Guerrero, Cali
Attendance: 14,000

October 31, 2008

Atlético Nacional	2 – 1	Deportivo Pasto
Galván Rey 18' 82'		Mosquera 58'

Estadio Atanasio Girardot, Medellín
Attendance: 7,580

November 8, 2008

Boyacá Chicó	0 – 1	Atlético Nacional
		Perea 37'

Estadio La Independencia, Tunja
Attendance: 5,300

November 16, 2008

Atlético Nacional	2 – 0	Atlético Huila
Perea 11' 39'

Estadio Atanasio Girardot, Medellín
Attendance: 30,853

November 23, 2008

La Equidad	0 – 0	Atlético Nacional

Estadio El Campín, Bogotá
Attendance: 18,000

November 27, 2008

Atlético Nacional	1 – 1	Independiente Medellín
Perea 69'		Corredor 71'

Estadio Atanasio Girardot, Medellín
Attendance: 41,237

November 30, 2008

Atlético Nacional	1 – 1	Deportes Tolima
W. Moreno 1'		Arrechea 12'

Estadio Atanasio Girardot, Medellín
Attendance: 36,585

December 7, 2008

Deportes Tolima	2 – 1	Atlético Nacional
Arrechea 8'; Arizala 82'		Moreno 19'

Estadio Manuel Murillo Toro, Ibagué
Attendance: ~15,000

December 10, 2008

Independiente Medellín	0 – 0	Atlético Nacional

Estadio Atanasio Girardot, Medellín
Attendance: 30,039

December 14, 2008

Atlético Nacional	1 – 4	La Equidad
Rentería 17'		Manga 25' 61'; Roberto Polo 41'; Carpintero 59'

Estadio Atanasio Girardot, Medellín
Attendance: 8,473

== Copa Colombia ==
Nacional had a decent run in the 2008 Copa Colombia, where they finished first in their group with only 1 loss against rivals DIM, but were unexpectedly eliminated by Primera B club Expreso Rojo in the third phase, which was the club that went the furthest in the tournament out of the clubs that weren't playing in the highest division.

=== Group stage ===
March 12, 2008

Atlético Nacional	2 – 0	Deportivo Pereira
Perez 37'; Angulo 51'

Estadio Atanasio Girardot, Medellín
Attendance: 400

March 26, 2008

Envigado FC	1 – 2	Atlético Nacional
Hernandez 10'		Angulo 15'; Arango 25'

Estadio Polideportivo Sur, Envigado

April 9, 2008

Atlético Nacional	3 – 1	Independiente Medellín
Devoz 24' 52'; Angulo 76'		Pertuz 59'

Estadio Atanasio Girardot, Medellín

April 30, 2008

Deportivo Rionegro	0 – 0	Atlético Nacional

Estadio Alberto Grisales, Rionegro

May 7, 2008

Atlético Nacional	1 – 0	Itagüí Ditaires
Devoz 51'

Estadio Atanasio Girardot, Medellín

May 28, 2008

Deportivo Pereira	0 – 0	Atlético Nacional

Estadio Hernán Ramírez Villegas, Pereira

June 4, 2008

Atlético Nacional	1 – 0	Envigado Fútbol Club
Mosquera 44'

Estadio Atanasio Girardot, Medellín

July 30, 2008

Independiente Medellín	1 – 0	Atlético Nacional
del Valle 29'

Estadio Atanasio Girardot, Medellín

August 6, 2008

Atlético Nacional	0 – 0	Deportivo Rionegro

Estadio Atanasio Girardot, Medellín

August 13, 2008

Itagüí Ditaires	2 – 3	Atlético Nacional
Gallo 22'; Alzate 59'		Perea 1'; Devoz 60'; Pulgarín 75'

Estadio Municipal Orlando Anibal Monroy, Caucasia

=== Second phase ===
August 27, 2008

Unión Magdalena	2 – 2	Atlético Nacional
Batalla 22'; Pacheco 46'		Correa 43'; Romaña 72'

Estadio Eduardo Santos, Santa Marta

September 3, 2008

Atlético Nacional	4 – 0	Unión Magdalena
Angulo 15'; Rentería 32'; Perea 54'; Devoz 75'

Estadio Atanasio Girardot, Medellín

Atletico Nacional won 6–2 on aggregate

=== Third phase ===
September 17, 2008

Expreso Rojo	2 – 0	Atlético Nacional
Quiñónez 10'; Tchoupe 50'

Estadio Fernando Mazuera, Fusagasugá

October 1, 2008

Atlético Nacional	1 – 0	Expreso Rojo
Rentería 71'

Estadio Atanasio Girardot, Medellín

Expreso Rojo won 2–1 on aggregate

== Copa Libertadores ==
Nacional made a good appearance in the 2008 Copa Libertadores. In the group stage they held the first place for the first five games, then in the last one when they lost 1-0 to São Paulo they went down to second place. In the round of 16 they had to play against Fluminense; in the first game Nacional lost at home 1-2, later in the second leg they lost 1-0 to the Brazilian club at Maracanã Stadium, which meant that Fluminense advanced to the next round, and Nacional were eliminated from the tournament.

=== Group stage ===
February 27, 2008
19:50

Atlético Nacional (Colombia)	1 – 1	(Brazil) São Paulo FC
Córdoba 8'	(Report)	Miranda 32'

Estadio Atanasio Girardot, Medellín
Attendance: 30,918
Referee: Víctor Hugo Rivera (Peru)

March 6, 2008

Atlético Nacional (Colombia)	3 – 0	(Paraguay) Sportivo Luqueño
Galvan Rey 22'; Villagra 43'; Valencia 79'	(Report)

Estadio Atanasio Girardot, Medellín
Attendance: 15,860
Referee: Jorge Larrionda (Uruguay)

March 18, 2008
21:50

Audax Italiano (Chile)	1 – 0	(Colombia) Atlético Nacional
Orellana 48'	(Report)

Estadio Municipal de La Florida, Santiago
Referee: Fernando Cabrera (Uruguay)

April 3, 2008
21:20

Atlético Nacional (Colombia)	1 – 1	(Chile) Audax Italiano
Villagra 59'	(Report)	Orellana 78'

Estadio Atanasio Girardot, Medellín
Referee: Wilmar Roldan (Colombia)

April 10, 2008
21:30

Sportivo Luqueño (Paraguay)	1 – 3	(Colombia) Atlético Nacional
Lazaga 71'	(Report)	Villagra 39'; Galvan Rey 51' (pen.); Córdoba 90'

Estadio Feliciano Cáceres, Luque
Attendance: 5,954

April 23, 2008
21:50

São Paulo FC (Brazil)	1 – 0	(Colombia) Atlético Nacional
Silva 39'	(Report)

Estádio do Morumbi, São Paulo
Attendance: 25,902

=== Round of 16 ===
2008-04-30
20:00

Atlético Nacional (Colombia)	1 – 2	(Brazil) Fluminense
Arrué 52'	(Report)	Thiago Neves 22' (pen.); Conca 76'

Estadio Atanasio Girardot, Medellín
Attendance: TBA
Referee: Martín Vázquez (URU)

2008-05-06
18:30

Fluminense (Brazil)	1 – 0	(Colombia) Atlético Nacional
Roger 52'	(Report)

Maracanã, Rio de Janeiro
Attendance: 31,700
Referee: Víctor Hugo Rivera (Peru)

Fluminense won 3–1 on aggregate.
