= 2009 Atlético Nacional season =

Atlético Nacional
2009 season
- Chairman: (Colombia) Víctor Marulanda
- Manager: (Colombia) Luis Fernando Suárez (until 22 April) (Colombia) José Santa (until 4 June) (Spain) Ramón Cabrero
- Copa Mustang: Apertura: 17th Finalizacion: 7th
- Copa Colombia: Semifinals
- Top goalscorer: League: G. Moreno (16); All: G. Moreno (16)
- Highest home attendance: 26,452 against Independiente Medellín
- Lowest home attendance: 3,092 against Boyacá Chicó

The 2009 Atlético Nacional season was Atlético Nacional's 61st season in the Categoría Primera A. In this season, the club only participated in the league and cup, as they failed to qualify to CONMEBOL tournaments like the Copa Libertadores and Sudamericana after a poor 2008 season.

For this season manager and club legend Luis Fernando Suárez was brought in, who won a league championship with Nacional in 1999, and won the Copa Libertadores with them as a player. However, he was sacked after only winning two of 16 matches in all competitions, being replaced by interim manager José Santa for the rest of the Apertura tournament. In June, Spanish manager Ramón Cabrero took over for the Finalizacion and the knockout stages of the Copa Colombia.

This was one of Nacional's most disappointing seasons: in the Apertura tournament they finished second-to-last in the table. The Finalizacion tournament was better, where they finished seventh in the regular season table and made the playoffs, but didn't qualify for the finals. They had a decent run in the cup, where they were eliminated in the semi-finals by Santa Fe.

== Team kit ==
This year Atlético Nacional changed their kit manufacturer to Adidas as their one-year contract with marathon expired. Postobón was still their shirt sponsor though, making this year their tenth year sponsoring them.

Supplier: Adidas
Sponsor(s): Postobón

Home	Away	Third

== Squad ==
As of January 29, 2009

Note: Flags indicate national team as defined under FIFA eligibility rules; some limited exceptions apply. Players may hold more than one non-FIFA nationality.

No.	Pos.	Nation	Player
1	GK	(Colombia) COL	Eduardo Blandón
2	DF	(Colombia) COL	Humberto Mendoza
3	DF	(Colombia) COL	Walter José Moreno
4	DF	(Colombia) COL	Juan Carlos Mosquera
5	DF	(Colombia) COL	Andrés Orozco
6	FW	(Colombia) COL	Cristian Correa
7	DF	(Brazil) BRA	Baiano
10	MF	(Colombia) COL	Aldo Ramírez
11	FW	(Colombia) COL	León Darío Muñoz
12	GK	(Colombia) COL	Carlos Barahona Angulo
13	MF	(Colombia) COL	José Amaya
14	MF	(Colombia) COL	Jairo Palomino

No.	Pos.	Nation	Player
17	FW	(Colombia) COL	Carlos Rentería
18	FW	(Colombia) COL	Luis Alberto Perea
19	FW	(Argentina) ARG	Sergio Galván Rey (Captain)
20	DF	(Colombia) COL	Julián Estiven Vélez
22	MF	(Colombia) COL	David Córdoba
23	DF	(Colombia) COL	Jimmy Bermúdez
24	MF	(Colombia) COL	Diego Toro
25	GK	(Colombia) COL	Christian Vargas
70	MF	(Colombia) COL	Giovanni Moreno
TBA	MF	(Colombia) COL	Harold Martínez
TBA	MF	(Colombia) COL	Jefferson Angulo
TBA	FW	(Peru) PER	Juan Mariño

=== Reserve & Youth Squad ===
Note: Flags indicate national team as defined under FIFA eligibility rules; some limited exceptions apply. Players may hold more than one non-FIFA nationality.

No.	Pos.	Nation	Player
--	GK	(Colombia) COL	Christian Vargas
--	DF	(Colombia) COL	Julián Andrés Díaz
--	DF	(Colombia) COL	Juan Pulgarín
--	DF	(Colombia) COL	Jair Enrique Iglesias
--	MF	(Colombia) COL	Santiago Ceferino
--	MF	(Colombia) COL	Jhonatan Cueto
--	MF	(Colombia) COL	Jhon Edison Parra

No.	Pos.	Nation	Player
--	MF	(Colombia) COL	Luis Londoño
--	MF	(Colombia) COL	Edwin Cardona
--	FW	(Colombia) COL	José Novelio Romaña
--	FW	(Colombia) COL	Yeison Javier Devoz
--	FW	(Colombia) COL	Daniel Arango
--	FW	(Brazil) BRA	John Cèiler
--	FW	(Colombia) COL	Juan González

=== Transfers ===
In:

- (Colombia) Andrés Orozco From (Brazil) Sport Club Internacional
- (Brazil) Baiano From (Brazil) Vasco da Gama
- (Colombia) Aldo Ramírez From (Mexico) Monarcas Morelia
- (Peru) Juan Carlos Mariño From (Peru) Cienciano (January)
- (Colombia) Armando Carrillo from Deportivo Cali (June)
- (Colombia) Jairo Patiño from San Luis (June)
- (Argentina) Ezequiel Maggiolo from Indios de Ciudad Juárez (June)
- (Argentina) Gastón Pezzuti from (Argentina) Gimnasia y Esgrima Jujuy (June)
- Loan Return: (Colombia) Marlon Piedrahita from Envigado (June)
- Loan Return: (Colombia) Yeison Devoz from Real Cartagena (June)

Out:

- Loan: (Colombia) Marlon Piedrahita to Envigado (January)
- Loan: (Colombia) Yeison Devoz to Real Cartagena (January)
- (Paraguay) Carlos Villagra To (Colombia) Deportivo Pasto
- (Colombia) Carlos Díaz To (Colombia) Deportivo Pereira
- (Colombia) Oscar Passo To (Colombia) Real Cartagena
- (Colombia) Carmelo Valencia To (Colombia) Millonarios
- Juan Carlos Mariño to Deportivo Cali (May)

== Statistics ==
=== Appearances and goals ===
No.	Pos	Nat	Player	Total		Copa Mustang - Apertura		Copa Mustang - Finalizacion	
No.	Pos	Nat	Player	Apps	Goals	Apps	Goals	Apps	Goals
1	GK	(Colombia) COL	Eduardo Blandón	10	0	10	0	0	0
3	DF	(Colombia) COL	Walter José Moreno	13	1	13	1	0	0
4	DF	(Colombia) COL	Juan Carlos Mosquera	4	0	1	0	3	0
5	DF	(Colombia) COL	Andrés Orozco	7	0	4	0	3	0
6	FW	(Colombia) COL	Cristian Correa	10	0	10	0	0	0
7	DF	(Brazil) BRA	Baiano	13	0	13	0	0	0
8	MF	(Colombia) COL	Jhon Charría	13	3	13	3	0	0
10	MF	(Colombia) COL	Aldo Ramírez	15	1	15	1	0	0
11	MF	(Colombia) COL	León Darío Muñoz	1	0	1	0	0	0
12	GK	(Colombia) COL	Carlos Barahona Angulo	8	0	5	0	3	0
13	MF	(Colombia) COL	José Amaya	11	0	11	0	0	0
14	MF	(Colombia) COL	Jairo Palomino	11	3	11	3	0	0
15	DF	(Colombia) COL	Humberto Antonio Mendoza	13	5	12	3	1	2
16	DF	(Colombia) COL	Felipe Chara	4	0	2	0	2	0
17	FW	(Colombia) COL	Carlos Rentería	12	0	10	0	2	0
18	FW	(Colombia) COL	Luis Alberto Perea	8	0	6	0	2	0
19	FW	(Argentina) ARG	Sergio Galván Rey	29	5	13	3	16	2
20	DF	(Colombia) COL	Julián Estiven Vélez	11	0	11	0	0	0
22	MF	(Colombia) COL	David Córdoba	0	0	0	0	0	0
23	MF	(Colombia) COL	Edwin Cardona	16	1	6	0	10	1
24	MF	(Colombia) COL	Diego Toro	8	0	5	0	3	0
25	GK	(Colombia) COL	Juan Carlos Patino	0	0	0	0	0	0
28	MF	(Colombia) COL	Orlando Berrío	22	0	10	0	12	0
70	MF	(Colombia) COL	Giovanni Moreno	34	16	12	3	22	13
99	MF	(Colombia) COL	Víctor Ibarbo	30	1	13	1	17	0
–	DF	(Colombia) COL	Jimmy Bermúdez	0	0	0	0	0	0
TBA	MF	(Colombia) COL	Harold Martínez	5	0	3	0	2	0
TBA	MF	(Colombia) COL	Jefferson Angulo	0	0	0	0	0	0
TBA	MF	(Peru) PER	Juan Mariño	5	0	4	0	1	0
TBA	FW	(Colombia) COL	Daniel Arango	6	0	4	0	2	0
TBA	DF	(Colombia) COL	Juan Guillermo Arboleda	3	0	2	0	1	0
TBA	FW	(Colombia) COL	Edinson Villalba	5	1	3	0	2	1
TBA	MF	(Colombia) COL	Jair Iglesias	6	0	3	0	3	0
TBA	MF	(Colombia) COL	Daniel Santa	4	0	3	0	1	0
TBA	MF	(Colombia) COL	Santiago Ceferino	3	0	0	0	3	0
TBA	MF	(Colombia) COL	Jhonatan Cueto	1	0	0	0	1	0

=== Disciplinary record ===
Includes all competitive matches. Players with 1 card or more included only.

Last updated on 19 April 2009.

Position	Nation	Number	Name	Copa Mustang-I		Copa Mustang-II		Copa Colombia		Total	
Position	Nation	Number	Name	Booked	Sent off (straight red)	Booked	Sent off (straight red)	Booked	Sent off (straight red)	Booked	Sent off (straight red)
DF	(Colombia)	5	Andrés Orozco	2	1	0	0	0	0	2	1
DF	(Brazil)	7	Baiano	5	1	0	0	0	0	5	1
MF	(Colombia)	13	José Amaya	3	1	0	0	0	0	3	1
FW	(Colombia)	TBA	Daniel Arango	2	0	0	0	0	0	2	0
MF	(Colombia)	6	Edwin Cardona	1	1	0	0	0	0	1	1
MF	(Colombia)	10	Aldo Ramírez	5	1	0	0	0	0	5	1
GK	(Colombia)	1	Eduardo Blandón	1	0	0	0	0	0	1	0
DF	(Colombia)	20	Julián Estiven Vélez	3	0	0	0	0	0	3	0
DF	(Colombia)	2	Humberto Mendoza	3	0	0	0	0	0	3	0
DF	(Colombia)	4	Walter Moreno	3	1	0	0	0	0	3	1
FW	(Colombia)	19	Sergio Galván Rey	1	0	0	0	0	0	1	0
FW	(Colombia)	70	Giovanni Moreno	1	1	0	0	0	0	1	1
FW	(Colombia)	99	Víctor Ibarbo	1	1	0	0	0	0	1	1
MF	(Colombia)	14	Jairo Palomino	2	1	0	0	0	0	2	1
GK	(Colombia)	12	Carlos Barahona	2	0	0	0	0	0	2	0
MF	(Colombia)	6	Cristian Correa	1	0	0	0	0	0	1	0
MF	(Colombia)	TBA	Daniel Santa	1	0	0	0	0	0	1	0
MF	(Colombia)	TBA	Jair Iglesias	1	0	0	0	0	0	1	0
MF	(Colombia)	25	Diego Toro	1	0	0	0	0	0	1	0
FW	(Colombia)	18	Luis Alberto Perea	1	0	0	0	0	0	1	0
			TOTALS	33	9	0	0	0	0	33	9

* = 1 suspension withdrawn
** = 2 suspensions withdrawn

== Pre-season ==
=== Copa Cajasai ===
20 January 2009
21:00

San Andrés U-20	1 – 2	Atlético Nacional
		Charría 36'; Ramírez 38'

Ewing O'neill, San Andrés

22 January 2009
20:00

Once Caldas	2 – 1	Atlético Nacional
Fano 19'; Nuñes 32'		Muñoz 83'

Ewing O'neill, San Andrés

=== Copa Cafam ===
29 January 2009
19:30

América de Cali	1 – 0	Atlético Nacional
Valencia 53'

Estadio El Campín, Bogotá

31 January 2009
18:15

Atlético Nacional	2 – 1	Argentinos Juniors
Ramírez 21'; Palomino 37'		Caruzzo 83'

Estadio El Campín, Bogotá

=== Friendly matches ===
This game was played by the alternate roster of Atlético Nacional since it was played the same day of the match of Copa Cafam. As for Envigado they also played with their alternative team.

31 January 2009
15:00

Atlético Nacional	1 – 0	Envigado
Devoz 36'

Estadio Alberto Grisales, Rionegro

== Torneo Apertura ==
The first two games for Atlético Nacional were played behind closed doors, due to the disturbances made by the fans in the last season's final game against La Equidad. The organization were fined around $5,000. Atlético Nacional struggled and lost the first six games of the season, finally winning their first match against Millonarios. Nacional then went on a six-match winless run, until manager Luis Fernando Suárez resigned from the team a few days after losing to Deportivo Cali on 19 April, later on 22 April José Santa would take over.

=== Results by round ===
Round	1	2	3	4	5	6	7	8	9	10	11	12	13	14	15	16	17	18
Ground	A	H	A	H	A	H	A	A	H	H	A	H	A	H	A	H	A	H
Result	L	L	L	L	L	W	D	D	D	L	D	L	W	L	D	D	W	D
Position	18	18	18	18	18	18	18	18	18	18	18	18	18	18	18	17	15	17

A = Away; H = Home; W = Win; D = Draw; L = Loss

=== Results ===
8 February 2009 1	La Equidad	1–0	Atlético Nacional	Estadio Metropolitano de Techo, Bogotá
	Polo 87'			Attendance: 1,358

15 February 2009 2	Atlético Nacional	0–2	América de Cali	Estadio Atanasio Girardot, Medellín
			Ramos 31'; Cortés 86'	Attendance: Closed doors

18 February 2009 3	Junior	3–0	Atlético Nacional	Estadio Metropolitano, Barranquilla
	Orozco 8'; Palacio 45'; Gutiérrez 69'			Attendance: 40,237

22 February 2009 4	Atlético Nacional	0–1	Deportes Quindío	Estadio Atanasio Girardot, Medellín
			Hernández 34'	Attendance: Closed doors

1 March 2009 5	Deportes Tolima	2–1	Atlético Nacional	Estadio Manuel Murillo Toro, Ibagué
	Marangoni 65'; Medina 80'		Galván Rey 38'	Attendance: 14,494

8 March 2009 6	Atlético Nacional	1–0	Millonarios	Estadio Atanasio Girardot, Medellín
	Mendoza 67'			Attendance: 15,576

15 March 2009 7	Cúcuta Deportivo	2–2	Atlético Nacional	Estadio General Santander, Cúcuta
	Moreno 16' (o.g); Arias 68'		Palomino 7' 56'	Attendance: 40,000

18 March 2009 8	Atlético Huila	3–3	Atlético Nacional	Estadio Guillermo Plazas Alcid, Neiva
	Valencia 1'; Velásquez 12' 55'		Mendoza 23'; W. Moreno 42'; Palomino 82'	Attendance: 15,000

22 March 2009 9	Atlético Nacional	0–0	Independiente Medellín	Estadio Atanasio Girardot, Medellín
		Report		Attendance: 26,452

4 April 2009 10	Atlético Nacional	0–2	Once Caldas	Estadio Atanasio Girardot, Medellín
			Rojas 37'; Mena 40'	Attendance: 10,086

12 April 2009 11	Deportivo Pasto	1–1	Atlético Nacional	Estadio Departamental Libertad, Pasto
	Ramírez 43'		Vélez 61' (o.g.)	Attendance: 4,000

19 April 2009 12	Atlético Nacional	1–2	Deportivo Cali	Estadio Atanasio Girardot, Medellín
	Mendoza 81' (pen.)		Herrera 28'; Batalla 86'	Attendance: 8,175

- Actual 14th round match; moved because of a clash with Boyacá Chicó's schedule as they were playing in Copa Libertadores.

22 April 2009 13	Atlético Nacional	2 – 1	Boyacá Chicó	Estadio Atanasio Girardot, Medellín
	G. Moreno 10' 60'		Nuñez 73'	Attendance: 3,092

26 April 2009 14	Real Cartagena	1 – 0	Atlético Nacional	Estadio Jaime Morón León, Cartagena
	Jiménez 65'			Attendance: 12,000

2 May 2009 15	Independiente Santa Fe	1 – 1	Atlético Nacional	Estadio El Campín, Bogotá
	Pérez 36'		G. Moreno 23'	Attendance: 10,000

9 May 2009 16	Atlético Nacional	1 – 1	Envigado	Estadio Atanasio Girardot, Medellin
	Galván Rey 83'		J. Serna 89'

13 May 2009 17	Independiente Medellin	1 – 2	Atletico Nacional	Estadio Atanasio Girardot, Medellin
	del Valle 19'		V. Ibarbo 44'; J. Palomino 66'

17 May 2009 18	Atletico Nacional	1 – 1	Deportivo Pereira	Estadio Atanasio Girardot, Medellin
	Galván Rey 12'	Report	Giménez 8'

== Copa Colombia ==
Despite Nacional's poor Apertura campaign, in the Copa Colombia they were undefeated for their first seven matches until losing El Clasico Paisa on 5 July. On 3 June, new manager Ramón Cabrero took over with his first match being a victory against Once Caldas. He led the team to the semi-finals, where they were eliminated by Independiente Santa Fe.

=== Group Stage ===
4 March 2009; 15:30 1	Atlético Nacional	1 – 1	Envigado	Estadio Atanasio Girardot, Medellín
	Villalba 71'		Suescan 89'

11 March 2009; 19:30 2	Once Caldas	0 – 0	Atlético Nacional	Estadio Palogrande, Manizales

25 March 2009 3	Atlético Nacional	0 – 0	Deportivo Rionegro	Estadio Atanasio Girardot, Medellín

15 April 2009 4	Atlético Nacional	3 – 3	Independiente Medellín	Estadio Atanasio Girardot, Medellín
	Mendoza 18' 83'; Iglesias 42'		Pertuz 35' del Valle 48'; Arboleda 73'

6 May 2009 5	Itagui Ditaires	0 – 0	Atletico Nacional	Estadio Atanasio Girardot

20 May 2009 6	Envigado	0 – 3	Atletico Nacional	Estadio Polideportivo Sur, Envigado
		Report	C. Renteria'; V. Ibarbo'; E. Cardona'

3 June 2009 7	Atletico Nacional	3 – 1	Once Caldas	Estadio Atanasio Girardot
		Report

5 July 2009 8	Independiente Medellin	2 – 0	Atletico Nacional	Estadio Atanasio Girardot

29 July 2009 9	Deportivo Rionegro	1 – 1	Atletico Nacional	Estadio Alberto Grisales, Rionegro

12 August 2009 10	Atletico Nacional	4 – 2	Itagui Ditaires

=== Second Stage ===
26 August 2009 L1	Atletico Nacional	4 – 1	Atletico de la Sabana

2 September 2009 L2	Atletico de la Sabana	1–3 (2–7 agg.)	Atletico Nacional

=== Third Stage ===
16 September 2009 L1	Atletico Nacional	2–0	Santa Fe

23 September 2009 L2	Atletico Bucaramanga	1–0 (1–2 agg.)	Atletico Nacional

=== Semifinals ===
L1	Atletico Nacional	2–1	Santa Fe	Medellin

L2	Santa Fe	3–2 (4–3 agg.)	Atletico Nacional	Estadio El Campin, Bogota
