= 2000 Copa Merconorte =

Copa Merconorte 2000
- Copa Merconorte logo

Tournament details
- Dates: 4 July – 9 November 2000
- Teams: 16 (from 7 associations)

Final positions
- Champions: (Colombia) Atlético Nacional (2nd title)
- Runners-up: (Colombia) Millonarios

Tournament statistics
- Matches played: 54
- Goals scored: 148 (2.74 per match)
- Top scorer: (Colombia) León Darío Muñoz (6)

The 2000 Copa Merconorte was the 3rd edition of association football tournament Copa Merconorte held in 2000. Atlético Nacional of Colombia beat another Colombian club, Millonarios, in the final.

== Participants ==
Country	Team
Bolivia (1 berth)	Oriente Petrolero
Colombia (3 berths)	América de Cali
Colombia (3 berths)	Atlético Nacional
Colombia (3 berths)	Millonarios
Costa Rica (1 berth)	Alajuelense
Ecuador (3 berths)	Barcelona
Ecuador (3 berths)	El Nacional
Ecuador (3 berths)	Emelec
Mexico (4 berths)	Guadalajara
Mexico (4 berths)	Necaxa
Mexico (4 berths)	Pachuca
Mexico (4 berths)	Toluca
Peru (3 berths)	Alianza Lima
Peru (3 berths)	Sporting Cristal
Peru (3 berths)	Universitario
Venezuela (1 berth)	Estudiantes de Mérida

== Group stage ==
Each team played the other teams in the group twice during the group stage. The first placed team advanced to the second round.

=== Group A ===
Pos	Team	Pld	W	D	L	GF	GA	GD	Pts	Qualification	(Mexico) GUA	(Ecuador) NAC	(Venezuela) EST	(Colombia) AME
1	(Mexico) Guadalajara	6	3	2	1	12	7	+5	11	Advance to Semifinals	—	1–0	4–0	1–1
2	(Ecuador) El Nacional	6	2	3	1	7	6	+1	9		3–3	—	2–1	1–0
3	(Venezuela) Estudiantes de Mérida	6	2	1	3	9	11	−2	7		2–3	1–1	—	3–0
4	(Colombia) América de Cali	6	1	2	3	3	7	−4	5		1–0	0–0	1–2	—

Source: RSSSF

=== Group B ===
Pos	Team	Pld	W	D	L	GF	GA	GD	Pts	Qualification	(Colombia) ATL	(Costa Rica) ALA	(Mexico) NEC	(Peru) ALI
1	(Colombia) Atlético Nacional	6	3	1	2	10	8	+2	10	Advance to Semifinals	—	2–0	0–0	4–1
2	(Costa Rica) Alajuelense	6	2	3	1	9	7	+2	9		3–0	—	2–2	2–1
3	(Mexico) Necaxa	6	1	4	1	5	5	0	7		2–1	1–1	—	0–0
4	(Peru) Alianza Lima	6	1	2	3	6	10	−4	5		2–3	1–1	1–0	—

Source: RSSSF

=== Group C ===
Pos	Team	Pld	W	D	L	GF	GA	GD	Pts	Qualification	(Colombia) MIL	(Mexico) TOL	(Ecuador) BAR	(Peru) UNI
1	(Colombia) Millonarios	6	3	3	0	11	6	+5	12	Advance to Semifinals	—	5–5	1–1	1–0
2	(Mexico) Toluca	6	2	2	2	15	11	+4	8		0–0	—	4–0	4–1
3	(Ecuador) Barcelona	6	1	3	2	6	10	−4	6		0–2	2–0	—	1–1
4	(Peru) Universitario	6	1	2	3	7	12	−5	5		0–2	3–2	2–2	—

Source: RSSSF

=== Group D ===
Pos	Team	Pld	W	D	L	GF	GA	GD	Pts	Qualification	(Ecuador) EME	(Mexico) PAC	(Peru) CRI	(Bolivia) ORI
1	(Ecuador) Emelec	6	3	2	1	6	4	+2	11	Advance to Semifinals	—	1–0	1–0	2–1
2	(Mexico) Pachuca	6	3	0	3	6	7	−1	9		1–0	—	1–0	2–1
3	(Peru) Sporting Cristal	6	2	2	2	10	7	+3	8		2–2	2–1	—	5–1
4	(Bolivia) Oriente Petrolero	6	1	2	3	7	11	−4	5		0–0	3–1	1–1	—

Source: RSSSF

== Semifinals ==
Team 1	Agg.	Team 2	1st leg	2nd leg
Guadalajara (Mexico)	4–4 (2–4 p)	(Colombia) Atlético Nacional	1–1	3–3
Emelec (Ecuador)	3–5	(Colombia) Millonarios	3–3	0–2

=== First leg ===
18 October 2000

Guadalajara (Mexico)	1–1	(Colombia) Atlético Nacional
Ruiz 75'		Aristizábal 73'

Estadio Jalisco, Guadalajara
Referee: (Argentina) Ángel Sánchez

19 October 2000

Emelec (Ecuador)	3–3	(Colombia) Millonarios
Kenig 6' (pen.), 52'; Juarez 8'		Ramírez 4'; Jiménez 20'; Suárez 80'

Estadio George Capwell, Guayaquil
Referee: (Chile) Mario Sánchez Yantén

=== Second leg ===
25 October 2000

Atlético Nacional (Colombia)	3–3	(Mexico) Guadalajara
Muñoz 20', 35'; Aristizábal 54' (pen.)		Ruiz 24'; Morales 43'; Nava 90'
Penalties
Rueda (penalty scored); Salcedo (penalty scored); Muñoz (penalty scored); González (penalty missed); Aristizábal (penalty scored)	4–2	Galindo (penalty missed); Ruiz (penalty scored); Nápoles (penalty scored); Alfaro (penalty missed)

Estadio Atanasio Girardot, Medellín
Referee: (Brazil) Antônio Pereira

26 October 2000

Millonarios (Colombia)	2–0	(Ecuador) Emelec
Oscar Millán 12'; Pérez 53'

Nemesio Camacho, Bogotá
Referee: (Brazil) Oscar Roberto Godói

== Finals ==
Team 1	Agg.	Team 2	1st leg	2nd leg
Millonarios (Colombia)	1–2	(Colombia) Atlético Nacional	0–0	1–2

=== First leg ===
2 November 2000

Millonarios (Colombia)	0–0	(Colombia) Atlético Nacional

Nemesio Camacho, Bogotá
Referee: (Colombia) Jorge Hernán Hoyos

=== Second leg ===
9 November 2000

Atlético Nacional (Colombia)	2–1	(Colombia) Millonarios
Moreno 8'; Aristizábal 49'		Jiménez 56'

Atanasio Girardot, Medellín
Referee: (Colombia) Henry Cervantes

== Statistics ==
=== Top scorers ===
Rank	Player	Team	Total
1	(Colombia) León Darío Muñoz	(Colombia) Atlético Nacional	6
2	(Peru) Jorge Soto	(Peru) Sporting Cristal	5
2	(Argentina) Alejandro Kenig	(Ecuador) Emelec	5
2	(Colombia) Víctor Hugo Aristizábal	(Colombia) Atlético Nacional	5
3	(Ecuador) Agustín Delgado	(Mexico) Necaxa	4
3	(Uruguay) Carlos María Morales	(Mexico) Toluca	4

Source: RSSSF
