= John Valencia =

John Valencia may refer to:

- Stiven Mendoza (John Stiven Mendoza Valencia, born 1992), Colombian football forward
- John Valencia (footballer, born 1982), Colombian football defender
- Jhon Valencia (born 1982), Colombian football midfielder
