= Copa Cafam =

Colombian preseason football tournament

The Copa Internacional Cafam was a pre-season football tournament played in Estadio El Campín, Bogotá in late January. The tournament was organized by Millonarios and Caja de Compensacion Familiar (Cafam).

Millonarios took the Copa Cafam title in 2009, after beating América de Cali 4–2 on penalties.

== Results ==
Year	Final			Third Place		
Year	Winner	Score	Runner-up	Third place	Score	Fourth place
2008	(Colombia) América de Cali	1 – 0	(Colombia) Millonarios	(Colombia) Santa Fe	3 – 0	(Argentina) Huracán
2009; Details	(Colombia) Millonarios	0 – 0 (4 – 2)	(Colombia) América de Cali	(Colombia) Atlético Nacional	2 – 1	(Argentina) Argentinos Juniors
2011	(Colombia) América de Cali	2 – 1	(Colombia) Millonarios	(Colombia) Santa Fe	Shared	(Colombia) Junior

== All-time scorers ==
2 goals

- (Colombia) Léider Preciado (Santa Fe)
- (Panama) Luis Tejada (América de Cali) (Millonarios)
- (Colombia) Avilés Hurtado (América de Cali)

1 goal

- (Colombia) Adrian Ramos (América de Cali)
- (Colombia) Ricardo Ciciliano (Millonarios)
- (Colombia) Martín García (Millonarios)
- (Colombia) Carlos Castillo (Millonarios)
- (Colombia) César Valoyes (Santa Fe)
- (Colombia) Luis Fernando Mosquera (Santa Fe)
- (Colombia) Jhon Valencia (América de Cali)
- (Argentina) Carlos Marinelli (Millonarios)
- (Colombia) Aldo Ramírez (Atlético Nacional)
- (Colombia) Jairo Palomino (Atlético Nacional)
- (Argentina) Matías Caruzzo (Argentinos Juniors)
- (Colombia) Duván Zapata (América de Cali)
- (Colombia) Óscar Rodas (Santa Fe)
- (Uruguay) José Luis Tancredi (Millonarios)

== Performances by team ==
Team	Winners	Runners-Up	Third	Fourth
(Colombia) América de Cali	2 (2008) (2011)	1 (2009)		
(Colombia) Millonarios	1 (2009)	2 (2008) (2011)		
(Colombia) Atlético Nacional			1 (2009)	
(Colombia) Santa Fe			1 (2008)	
(Argentina) Argentinos Juniors				1 (2009)
(Argentina) Club Atlético Huracán				1 (2008)
