= Yeison =

Yeison is a Hispanicized form of the given name Jason. It may refer to:

- Yeison Asencio (born 1989), Dominican baseball player
- Yeison Carabalí (born 1993), Colombian footballer
- Yeison Chacón (born 1988), Colombian footballer
- Yeison Colomé (born 1996), Dominican basketball player
- Yeison Delgado (born 1977), Venezuelan cyclist
- Yeison Devoz (born 1989), Colombian footballer
- Yeison Gordillo (born 1992), Colombian footballer
- Yeison Guerrero (born 1998), Ecuadorian footballer
- Yeison Guzmán (born 1998), Colombian footballer
- Yeison Jiménez (1991–2026), Colombian música popular singer-songwriter and composer
- Yeison López (born 1999), Colombian footballer
- Yeison Mejía (born 1998), Honduran footballer
- Yeison Mendoza (1994–2019), Colombian footballer
- Yeison Molina (born 1998), Costa Rican footballer
- Yeison Murillo (born 1993), Colombian footballer
- Yeison Ordóñez (born 1992), Ecuadorian footballer
- Yeison Rivas (born 1987), Colombian hurdler
- Yeison Rojas Martínez, Governor of the Guaviare Department
- Yeison Tolosa (born 1999), Colombian footballer
- Yeison Vinces (born 1994), Peruvian footballer

== See also ==
- Yerson
- Yeyson Liendo Mamani and Sonia Gaona Yaguno, Peruvian serial killers
