= 2009 Copa Cafam =

Copa Internacional Cafam 2009 was a football pre-season international tournament. It was played in Estadio El Campín of Bogotá, Colombia between January 28 and February 1, 2009. In the tournament, there were three teams from Colombia and one from Argentina.

== Participating teams ==
- (Colombia) Millonarios
- (Colombia) América de Cali
- (Colombia) Atlético Nacional
- (Argentina) Argentinos Juniors

=== Semi-finals ===
2009-01-28

Atlético Nacional (Colombia)	0 – 1	(Colombia) América de Cali
		Valencia 53'

Estadio El Campín, Bogotá

2009-01-29

Millonarios (Colombia)	2 – 0	(Argentina) Argentinos Juniors
Marinelli 58'; Tejada 72'

Estadio El Campín, Bogotá

=== Third place play-off ===
2009-01-31
18:15

Atlético Nacional (Colombia)	2 – 1	(Argentina) Argentinos Juniors
Ramírez 21'; Palomino 37'		Caruzzo 83'

Estadio El Campín, Bogotá

=== Final ===
2009-02-01
15:30

Millonarios (Colombia)	0 – 0	(Colombia) América de Cali
Penalties
Hurtado (penalty scored); Bedoya (penalty scored); Marinelli (penalty scored); Valencia (penalty scored)	4 – 2	(penalty scored) Restrepo; (penalty missed) Arango; (penalty scored) Valencia; (penalty missed) Tavima

Estadio El Campín, Bogotá

Copa Cafam
2009 Winners

Millonarios
First title
