= Yerson =

Yerson is a given name. Notable people with the name include:

- Yerson Candelo (born 1992), Colombian footballer
- Yerson Chacón (born 2003), Venezuelan footballer
- Yerson Gutiérrez (born 1994), Colombian footballer
- Yerson Mosquera (born 2001), Colombian professional footballer
- Yerson Opazo (born 1984), Chilean footballer
- Yerson Zambrano, Ecuadorian football referee

== See also ==
- Yeison (disambiguation)
