= Fernando Martel =

Chilean footballer (born 1975)

Personal information
- Full name: Fernando Patricio Martel Helo
- Date of birth: 2 October 1975 (age 51)
- Place of birth: San Felipe, Chile
- Height: 1.68 m (5 ft 6 in)
- Position: Midfielder

Youth career
- Arturo Prat
- Unión San Felipe

Senior career*
Years	Team	Apps	(Gls)
1993–1997	Unión San Felipe	91	(20)
1997–1998	Everton	54	(10)
1999–2002	Santiago Morning	103	(33)
2002	Santiago Wanderers	16	(3)
2003	Cobreloa	18	(6)
2003	Chiapas	16	(3)
2004	Atlante	27	(6)
2005	Cobreloa	23	(6)
2006	Alianza Lima	41	(6)
2007	Everton	20	(3)
2007–2008	Atlético Nacional	13	(4)
2008	Ñublense	18	(5)
2009–2011	Deportes Iquique	98	(30)
2012	Deportes Antofagasta	7	(1)
2013	Unión San Felipe	7	(1)
Total		552	(137)

International career
1995	Chile U20		
2001–2004	Chile	14	(0)
2001	Chile B	1	(0)
- * Club domestic league appearances and goals

Fernando Patricio Martel Helo (born 2 October 1975) is a Chilean former footballer who played as a midfielder.

== Club career ==
Born in San Felipe, Chile, Martel was with Club Social y Deportivo Arturo Prat before joining Unión San Felipe.

== International career ==
Martel represented Chile at under-20 level in the 1995 FIFA World Youth Championship.

At senior level, he made 14 appearances for the Chile national team 2001 to 2004. In addition, he made an appearance for Chile B in the friendly match against Catalonia on 28 December 2001.

== Personal life ==
Following his retirement, Martel started a taxicab company and has spending time in his family's auto repair shop.

== Honours ==
Cobreloa

- Primera División de Chile (1): 2003 Apertura

Alianza Lima

- Peruvian Primera División (1): 2006 Descentralizado

Atlético Nacional

- Primera División de Colombia (1): 2007 Finalización

Deportes Iquique

- Primera B (1): 2010
- Copa Chile (1): 2010
