= Carlos Díaz (footballer, born 1982) =

Colombian footballer

Carlos Alberto Díaz
Personal information
- Full name: Carlos Alberto Díaz
- Date of birth: 28 November 1982 (age 43)
- Place of birth: Necoclí, Colombia
- Height: 1.76 m (5 ft 9 1/2 in)
- Position: Defender

Team information
- Current team: Boyacá Chicó

Senior career*
Years	Team	Apps	(Gls)
2001–2010	Atlético Nacional	142	(6)
2009–2010	→ Once Caldas (loan)	23	(2)
2010	→ Envigado (loan)	19	(0)
2011–2012	Cúcuta Deportivo	23	(0)
2012–2013	Deportivo Pereira	23	(1)
2013–2016	Atlético Huila	79	(5)
2016–	Boyacá Chicó	0	(0)
- * Club domestic league appearances and goals

Carlos Alberto Díaz (born November 28, 1982) is a Colombian footballer who plays as a defender for Boyacá Chicó.

== Titles ==
Season	Club	Title
2005	Atlético Nacional	Categoría Primera A - Torneo Apertura
2007	Atlético Nacional	Categoría Primera A - Torneo Apertura
2007	Atlético Nacional	Categoría Primera A - Torneo Finalización
2009	Once Caldas	Categoría Primera A - Torneo Apertura
