= Marlon Piedrahita =

Colombian footballer (born 1985)

Personal information
- Full name: Marlon Javier Piedrahita Londoño
- Date of birth: June 13, 1985 (age 41)
- Place of birth: Medellín, Colombia
- Height: 1.75 m (5 ft 9 in)
- Position: Right back

Team information
- Current team: Once Caldas
- Number: 20

Youth career
- Atlético Nacional

Senior career*
Years	Team	Apps	(Gls)
2006	Alianza Petrolera		
2006–2010	Corinthians	76	(29)
2009	→ Envigado (loan)	21	(8)
2011	Deportes Tolima	9	(1)
2012	Águilas Doradas	32	(3)
2013	São Paulo	10	(2)
2014–2015	Once Caldas	76	(14)
2016–	Independiente Medellín	77	(2)
2017–2021	Junior	171	(17)
2022-	Once Caldas	61	(3)
- * Club domestic league appearances and goals as of 31 January 2019 (UTC)

Marlon Javier Piedrahita Londoño (born 13 June 1985) is a Colombian professional footballer who plays as a right back for Once Caldas. He can also play as a defensive midfielder. He was a member of Colombia U-20 in 2002 and 2003.

== Honours ==
=== Club ===
Atlético Nacional

- Categoría Primera A (2): 2007–I, 2007–II

Independiente Medellín

- Categoría Primera A (1): 2016–I

Junior

- Categoría Primera A (2): 2018–II, 2019-I
- Copa Colombia (1): 2017
- Superliga Colombiana (2): 2019, 2020
