= Alejandro Kenig =

Argentine footballer

Personal information
- Full name: Alejandro Martín Kenig
- Date of birth: 31 January 1969 (age 57)
- Place of birth: Mar del Plata, Argentina
- Position: Striker

Senior career*
Years	Team	Apps	(Gls)
1989	Deportivo Español	19	(7)
1990	Maccabi Tel Aviv	10	(5)
1990–1991	Talleres	32	(9)
1991	Deportivo Español	16	(6)
1992	Universidad Católica	14	(7)
1992–1993	Talleres	34	(14)
1993–1994	Deportivo Cali	22	(10)
1994	Bolívar	5	(2)
1994–1995	Platense	22	(8)
1995–1996	Coquimbo Unido		
1997	Atlético Tucumán	18	(6)
1998	Hakoah Ramat Gan		
1998	Deportivo Cuenca		
1999	Olimpia	48	(30)
1999	Deportivo Quito	20	(15)
2000	Emelec	40	(25)
2001	Deportivo Quito	5	(1)
2001	L.D.U. Quito	15	(3)
- * Club domestic league appearances and goals

Alejandro Martín Kenig (born 31 January 1969 in Mar del Plata) best known as "el gordo" (The fat) is a retired Argentine footballer who played for a number of clubs both in Argentina and South America, including Club Atlético Platense, Talleres de Córdoba, Club Bolívar and Club Sport Emelec.
