= Camilo Pérez (footballer) =

Colombian footballer (born 1985)

Camilo Perez
Personal information
- Full name: Juan Camilo Pérez Saldarriaga
- Date of birth: October 26, 1985 (age 41)
- Place of birth: Medellín, Antioquia, Colombia
- Height: 1.79 m (5 ft 10 in)
- Position: Centre-back

Youth career
- Atlético Nacional

Senior career*
Years	Team	Apps	(Gls)
2006–2010	Atlético Nacional		
2008	→ Envigado (loan)		
2009	→ La Equidad (loan)	9	(0)
2011–2012	Envigado	47	(1)
2013	Deportivo Pasto	38	(3)
2014–2015	Once Caldas	48	(0)
2015	Rionegro Águilas	13	(0)
2016	La Equidad	16	(2)
2016–2017	América de Cali	12	(0)
2017	Rionegro Águilas	18	(0)
2018	Deportivo Pereira	10	(0)
2018	Rionegro Águilas	7	(0)
2019–2021	Boyacá Chicó	51	(5)
2021	Llaneros	9	(0)
- * Club domestic league appearances and goals as of 18:44, 9 April 2023 (UTC)

Juan Camilo Pérez Saldarriaga (born October 26, 1985) is a Colombian footballer.
