= Yeison Devoz =

Colombian football forward (born 1989)

Personal information
- Full name: Yeison Javier Devoz Anaya
- Date of birth: April 4, 1989 (age 37)
- Place of birth: Cartagena, Colombia
- Height: 1.70 m (5 ft 7 in)
- Position: Forward

Senior career*
| Years | Team | Apps | (Gls) |
| 2006–2012 | Atlético Nacional | 28 | (0) |
| 2006 | → Alianza Petrolera (loan) | 24 | (2) |
| 2009 | → Real Cartagena (loan) | 5 | (0) |
| 2010 | → Itagüí (loan) | 0 | (0) |
| 2011–2012 | → Alianza Petrolera (loan) | 43 | (11) |
- * Club domestic league appearances and goals as of February 3, 2013

Yeison Javier Devoz Anaya (born 4 April 1989) is a Colombian football forward. He is currently free agent.

== Titles ==
| Season | Club | Title |
|---|---|---|
| 2007 | Atlético Nacional | Categoría Primera A - Torneo Apertura |
| 2007 | Atlético Nacional | Categoría Primera A - Torneo Finalización |
| 2010 | Itagüí Ditaires | Categoría Primera B |
