= William Arboleda =

Colombian footballer (born 1990)

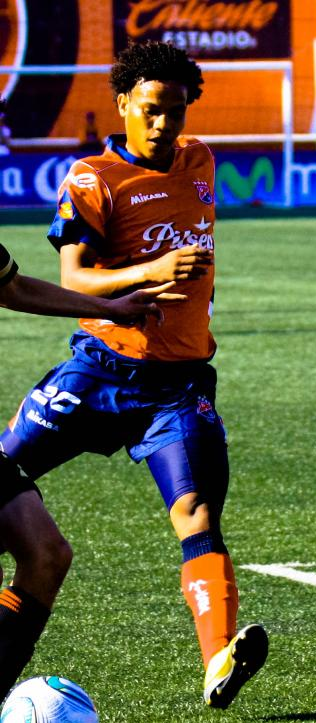

Personal information
- Full name: William Francisco Luis Arboleda Perea
- Date of birth: 8 June 1990 (age 36)
- Place of birth: Buenaventura, Valle del Cauca, Colombia
- Height: 1.76 m (5 ft 9 1/2 in)
- Position: Midfielder

Senior career*
Years	Team	Apps	(Gls)
2007–2014	Independiente Medellín	107	(9)
2010	→ Real Cartagena (loan)	15	(0)
2015–2016	Celaya	3	(0)
2016–2017	América de Cali	47	(1)
2017–2018	Celaya	22	(1)
2019	Independiente Medellín	8	(0)
- * Club domestic league appearances and goals as of 17:07, 25 October 2020 (UTC)

William Francisco Luis Arboleda Perea (born 8 June 1990) is a Colombian footballer who plays as a midfielder.
