= Andrés Saldarriaga =

Colombian footballer (born 1978)

Personal information
- Full name: Andrés David Saldarriaga Cardona
- Date of birth: 18 September 1978 (age 48)
- Place of birth: Medellín, Colombia
- Height: 1.83 m (6 ft 0 in)
- Position: Goalkeeper

Team information
- Current team: Boyacá Chicó
- Number: 12

Youth career
- Deportes Quindío

Senior career*
Years	Team	Apps	(Gls)
1999–2002	Deportes Quindío	83	(0)
2003–2009	Atlético Nacional	73	(0)
2007–2008	→ Cúcuta Deportivo (loan)	24	(0)
2009	Once Caldas	8	(0)
2010–2011	Envigado	38	(0)
2013–	Boyacá Chicó	5	(0)
- * Club domestic league appearances and goals as of 01:24, 24 April 2013 (UTC)

Andrés David Saldarriaga Cardona (born 18 September 1978) is a Colombian goalkeeper who plays for Boyacá Chicó in the Copa Mustang. He was born in Medellín, Colombia.

== Club career ==
Saldarriaga previously played for Deportes Quindío, Atlético Nacional, where he went on loan to Cúcuta Deportivo and Once Caldas.

== International career ==
Saldarriaga was a member of the Colombia U-23 National Team. He was called into the senior squad for the CONMEBOL qualifiers for the 2002 FIFA World Cup, but did not appear in any matches.
