= Humberto Mendoza =

Colombian footballer (born 1984)

Personal information
- Full name: Humberto Antonio Mendoza
- Date of birth: October 2, 1984 (age 42)
- Place of birth: Bucaramanga, Santander, Colombia
- Height: 1.92 m (6 ft 4 in)
- Position: Centre back

Senior career*
Years	Team	Apps	(Gls)
2002–2004	Atlético Bucaramanga	35	(0)
2005–2010	Atlético Nacional	148	(14)
2011	→ Colón (loan)	3	(0)
2011–2012	Real Cartagena	27	(4)
2012	Envigado	16	(1)
2013	Santa Fe	5	(0)
2013	Envigado	14	(1)
2014–2016	Real Cartagena	90	(12)
2017–2018	Atlético Veragüense	43	(3)
2018–2019	San Francisco	28	(2)
2019	Envigado	12	(1)
2020	Llacuabamba	14	(2)

International career
2005–2009	Colombia	12	(2)
- * Club domestic league appearances and goals as of 18:14, 19 May 2021 (UTC)

Humberto Antonio Mendoza (born October 2, 1984) is a Colombian football centre back.

== Club career ==
Mendoza debuted as a professional in 2002 playing for Atlético Bucaramanga. He was then transferred to Atlético Nacional.

In January 2011, the defender was transferred to Colón of Argentina, for his first experience outside his native country. After an unsuccessful six months spell at Colón he returned to Colombia to play for his current club.

== International career ==
Mendoza's first call for the Colombia national football team was in 2005, to play the CONCACAF Gold Cup.

== Honours ==
=== Club ===
Atlético Nacional

- Fútbol Profesional Colombiano: 2005 Apertura, 2007 Apertura, 2007 Finalización
