= Stalin Motta =

Colombian footballer (born 1984)

Personal information
- Full name: Stalin Motta Vaquiro
- Date of birth: 28 March 1984 (age 42)
- Place of birth: Bogotá, Colombia
- Height: 1.75 m (5 ft 9 in)
- Position: Attacking midfielder

Team information
- Current team: Cucuta Deportivo
- Number: 10

Youth career
- 2002–2003: Independiente Santa Fe

Senior career*
Years	Team	Apps	(Gls)
2004	Chía FC		
2005–	La Equidad	438	(64)
2010	→ Atlético Nacional (loan)	24	(2)
2014	→ Barcelona SC (loan)	15	(0)
2022-	Cúcuta Deportivo		

International career
2008–2009	Colombia	3	(0)
- * Club domestic league appearances and goals as of 21:13, 3 November 2020 (UTC)

Stalin Motta Vaquiro (born 28 March 1984) is a Colombian football midfielder who plays for Cucuta Deportivo.

== Club career ==
Most of his career was spent playing for La Equidad in the Categoría Primera A.

He was responsible for his former club La Equidad top standing in the Colombian league. When he was younger he was regarded as a promising player for Colombia.

After long negotiations he was transferred to Atlético Nacional in January 2010, coming as a key part to help the team that Ramon Cabrero will use to affront the challenges.

== Honors ==
La Equidad

- Categoria Primera B (2006)
- Copa Colombia (2008)
