= Walter Moreno =

Colombian footballer (born 1978)

Personal information
- Full name: Walter Jose Moreno Arco
- Date of birth: May 18, 1978 (age 48)
- Place of birth: Cali, Colombia
- Height: 1.82 m (6 ft 0 in)
- Position: Defender

Team information
- Current team: Unión Comercio
- Number: 3

Senior career*
| Years | Team | Apps | (Gls) |
| 2005 | Chico FC | 10 | (0) |
| 2006–2007 | Cúcuta Deportivo | 79 | (1) |
| 2008–2010 | Atlético Nacional | 63 | (3) |
| 2010–2011 | Deportivo Táchira | 30 | (2) |
| 2011–2013 | Mineros de Guayana | 54 | (0) |
| 2013 | Cúcuta Deportivo | 6 | (0) |
| 2014– | Unión Comercio | 52 | (3) |

International career^{‡}
| 2007–2008 | Colombia | 10 | (0) |
- * Club domestic league appearances and goals as of 20 September 2013 ‡ National team caps and goals as of 22:39, 17 February 2010 (UTC)

Walter José Moreno (born 18 May 1978) is a Colombian footballer who currently plays for Unión Comercio in the Primera División Peruana.

He was one of the pillars in defense for Cúcuta Deportivo in their historic 2006 run.

== Honors ==
- Champions Colombian Primera A, 2006 Cúcuta Deportivo
- Semifinalist of Copa Libertadores, 2007 Cúcuta Deportivo
