= Jhon Charría =

Colombian footballer (born 1978)

Personal information
- Full name: Jhon Jairo Charría Escobar
- Date of birth: May 14, 1978 (age 48)
- Place of birth: Candelaria, Colombia
- Height: 1.75 m (5 ft 9 in)
- Position: Attacking midfielder

Team information
- Current team: Delfines del Este
- Number: 10

Senior career*
Years	Team	Apps	(Gls)
1998	América de Cali		
1999	Deportivo Pasto		
2000	Deportes Tolima		
2001	Deportivo Pasto		
2002–2008	Deportes Tolima		
2008–2009	Atlético Nacional	54	(6)
2009	Deportivo Pereira	12	(2)
2010–2011	Deportivo Cali	8	(1)
2011–2012	Boyacá Chicó	7	(3)
2012	Atlético Bucaramanga	2	(0)
2012–2013	Universitario Popayán	37	(5)
2016–	Delfines del Este	5⩲	(3)
- * Club domestic league appearances and goals as of 13 May 2016

Jhon Jairo Charría Escobar (born May 14, 1978) is a Colombian football midfielder currently playing for Delfines del Este FC in the Liga Dominicana de Fútbol. Charría is known for his ability to score mid-range goals with either foot.

Despite being a midfielder, he has been one of the top goal scorers in the Copa Mustang.
