= Estadio Fernando Mazuera =

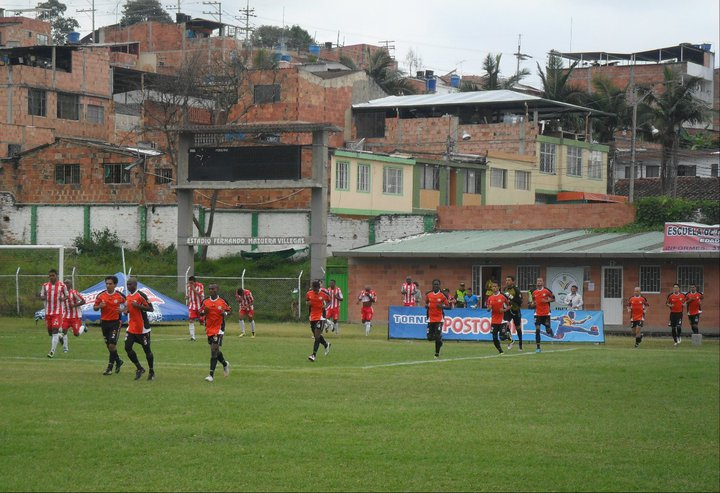
- ESTADIO FERNANDO MAZUERA
- Interactive map of Estadio Fernando Mazuera
- Location: Fusagasugá, Colombia
- Coordinates: 4°20′2.7″N 74°21′45.7″W
- Capacity: 4,500
- Surface: grass

Tenant
- Expreso Rojo

Estadio Fernando Mazuera is a multi-use stadium in Fusagasugá, Colombia. It is currently used mostly for football matches and is the home stadium of Expreso Rojo. The stadium holds 4,500 people.
