= Oscar Passo =

Colombian footballer (born 1980)

Personal information
- Full name: Oscar Enrique Passo Diaz
- Date of birth: May 13, 1980 (age 46)
- Place of birth: Bodega Central, Cesar, Colombia
- Height: 1.83 m (6 ft 0 in)
- Position: Defender

Senior career*
Years	Team	Apps	(Gls)
1998	Real Cartagena	0	(0)
1999–2005	Deportes Tolima	212	(3)
2006–2008	Atlético Nacional	36	(4)
2009–2010	Real Cartagena		

International career
2005–2006	Colombia	7	(0)
- * Club domestic league appearances and goals

Oscar Passo (born May 13, 1980) is a Colombian retired footballer who played as a defender.

He began his career with Real Cartagena in 1998, playing once until transferring to Deportes Tolima in 1999. With Tolima, he won the 2003 league title, before leaving the club in 2005. In 2006, he joined Atlético Nacional, and won two titles in the 2007 Apertura and 2007 Finalizacion. in 2009, he rejoined Real Cartagena and retired the following year.

He has been capped seven times by the Colombia national team, playing for them at the 2005 Gold Cup and in the 2006 FIFA World Cup qualifiers against Uruguay, Chile, and Peru.

== Honours ==
=== Deportes Tolima ===
Categoria Primera A: 2003

=== Atletico Nacional ===
Categoria Primera A: 2007 Apertura, 2007 Finalizacion
