= Carlos Rentería (footballer, born 1986) =

Colombian footballer

Personal information
- Full name: Carlos Alveiro Rentería Cuesta
- Date of birth: 4 March 1986 (age 40)
- Place of birth: Quibdó, Chocó, Colombia
- Height: 1.75 m (5 ft 9 in)
- Position: Striker

Senior career*
Years	Team	Apps	(Gls)
2006–2008	Real Cartagena	47	(7)
2008	Atlético Huila	16	(10)
2008	Atlético Nacional	25	(2)
2008–2010	→ Atlético Huila (loan)	12	(2)
2010–2011	La Equidad	38	(18)
2011–2012	Atlético Nacional	51	(18)
2012–2014	→ Atlético Junior (loan)	12	(1)
2014–2015	Patriotas	53	(19)

International career^{‡}
2008	Colombia	1	(0)
- * Club domestic league appearances and goals as of May 20, 2013 ‡ National team caps and goals as of July 15, 2009

Carlos Alveiro Rentería Cuesta (born 4 March 1986 in Quibdó, Chocó) is a Colombian footballer who plays as striker.

== Club career ==
After a great season and scoring 10 goals in the Colombian league, he had many offers from big clubs in Colombia as well as the Swiss club Basel. Renteria chose Atlético Nacional because performing well there would get him future call ups to the National team, and better offers abroad. In 2009 was loaned back to Atlético Huila after an accident killed two Huila players.

== Personal life ==
His brother, Wason is a professional footballer currently playing for Millonarios.
