= Jefferson Angulo =

Colombian footballer (born 1986)

Personal information
- Full name: Jefferson Angulo Murillo
- Date of birth: December 26, 1986 (age 39)
- Place of birth: Pereira, Colombia
- Height: 1.74 m (5 ft 8 1/2 in)
- Position: Midfielder

Youth career
- 2001–2003: Atlético Nacional
- 2005: Deportivo Pereira

Senior career*
| Years | Team | Apps | (Gls) |
| 2004 | Deportivo Pereira | | |
| 2006 | Alianza Petrolera | | |
| 2007 | Atlético Bello | | |
| 2007–2008 | Atlético Nacional | 4 | (0) |
| 2009 | Atlético Huila | 4 | (1) |
| 2009 | Vila Nova-GO | 4 | (0) |
| 2010 | Gremio Santanense | 8 | (0) |
| 2010 | FK Baku | 7 | (0) |
| 2011 | Millonarios | 16 | (2) |
| 2012 | Itagüí | 8 | (1) |
| 2012 | Once Caldas | 4 | (0) |
| 2013 | Novo Hamburgo | 0 | (0) |
| 2013 | Guaratinguetá | 5 | (0) |
| 2014 | Duque de Caxias | 3 | (0) |
| 2015 | Suchitepéquez | 8 | (0) |
| 2016 | Jaguares | 0 | (0) |
| 2016 | Fortaleza CEIF | 4 | (0) |

International career
| 2007 | Colombia U-20 | | |
- * Club domestic league appearances and goals

Jefferson Angulo Murillo (born December 26, 1986) is a professional footballer who last played for Fortaleza CEIF.

== Career ==
=== Club career ===
Jefferson Angulo began his career in the youth ranks of Atlético Nacional and Deportivo Pereira. He made his professional debut in 2004 with Pereira, and then went on to play for smaller Colombian clubs Alianza Petrolera and Atlético Bello.

He made his First division debut for Atlético Nacional against La Equidad on July 20, 2007. He remained at the club for two seasons and then joined fellow top flight club Atlético Huila in 2009. In mid-season he joined Brazilian club Vila Nova and appeared in four matches for the club. In 2010, he left Vila Nova and signed with Gremio Santanense. His stay at the club was short as he left once again in mid-season to join FK Baku in Azerbaijan.

In early 2011 Angulo returned to Colombia signing with top side Millonarios.
