= Carlos Barahona =

Colombian goalkeeper (born 1980)

Carlos Barahona Angulo
Personal information
- Full name: Carlos Alberto Barahona Angulo
- Date of birth: January 20, 1980 (age 46)
- Place of birth: Bugalagrande, Valle del Cauca, Colombia
- Height: 1.82 m (5 ft 11 1/2 in)
- Position: Goalkeeper

Team information
- Current team: San José
- Number: 27

Youth career
- Cortuluá

Senior career*
Years	Team	Apps	(Gls)
2002–2004	Cortuluá		
2005–2007	Deportivo Pasto		
2007–2009	Atlético Nacional	8	(0)
2010–2011	Cortuluá	18	(0)
2011	Envigado	19	(0)
2012	Cúcuta Deportivo	5	(0)
2012–2013	San José	7	(0)
2014–2015	Nacional Potosí		
- * Club domestic league appearances and goals as of 1 November 2012

Carlos Alberto Barahona Angulo (born January 20, 1980) is a Colombian former footballer who played as a goalkeeper both domestically and in the Liga de Fútbol Profesional Boliviano.

He was a member of the Colombian U-19 and U-21 National Teams. He is the older brother of Julián Barahona who plays midfield for Patriotas FC.

== International career ==
In June 2023, he took part in the Maurice Revello Tournament in France with Costa Rica.
