= Juan Carlos Mosquera =

Colombian footballer (born 1982)

Personal information
- Full name: Juan Carlos Mosquera Gómez
- Date of birth: 10 December 1982 (age 43)
- Place of birth: Medellín, Colombia
- Height: 1.82 m (5 ft 11 1/2 in)
- Position: Defender

Youth career
- Atlético Nacional

Senior career*
Years	Team	Apps	(Gls)
2003–2007	Atlético Nacional	19	(3)
2007	Deportes Quindío	9	(0)
2008–2009	Atlético Nacional	13	(0)
2009–2010	Once Caldas	11	(0)
2010	Atlético Nacional	14	(0)
2011–2014	Deportivo Pasto	125	(6)
2015	Cortuluá	29	(0)
2016	Sport Huancayo	10	(0)
- * Club domestic league appearances and goals as of 15:09, 11 March 2009 (UTC)

Juan Carlos Mosquera Gómez (born 10 December 1982) is a Colombian footballer who played for Atlético Nacional, Once Caldas, Deportivo Pasto and Cortuluá in the Categoría Primera A.
