= Jimmy Bermúdez =

Footballer (born 1987)

Personal information
- Full name: Jimmy Bermúdez Valencia
- Date of birth: 16 December 1987 (age 38)
- Place of birth: Puerto Tejada, Colombia
- Height: 1.83 m (6 ft 0 in)
- Position: Centre back

Youth career
- 2004: Boca Juniors de Cali
- 200?–2006: Atlético Nacional

Senior career*
| Years | Team | Apps | (Gls) |
| 2006 | → Alianza Petrolera (loan) | | |
| 2006 | → Atlético Bucaramanga (loan) | 11 | (0) |
| 2007–2009 | Atlético Nacional | 9 | (0) |
| 2010 | Envigado | 25 | (0) |
| 2011 | Atlético Huila | 10 | (0) |
| 2012–2016 | LDU Loja | 66 | (0) |
| 2014–2015 | → Atlante (loan) | 17 | (0) |
| 2015–2017 | Atlante | 35 | (0) |
| 2017–2018 | Rionegro Águilas | 2 | (0) |
| 2018 | Atlético | 13 | (0) |
| 2019 | Leones Vegetarianos | | |
| 2020 | Olmedo | 8 | (0) |

International career^{‡}
| 2007 | Colombia U20 | 6 | (0) |
| 2013–2014 | Equatorial Guinea | 4 | (1) |
- * Club domestic league appearances and goals as of 22 November 2020. ‡ National team caps and goals as of 11 February 2019

Jimmy Bermúdez Valencia (born 16 December 1987) is a former professional footballer who played as a defender. Mainly a centre-back, he also operated as a full-back.

Formed at Boca Juniors de Cali, Bermúdez joined Colombian giants Atlético Nacional and was loaned to Alianza Petrolera in the Categoría Primera B, where he began his professional career. After a second loan, this time to Atlético Bucaramanga in the Categoría Primera A, he was able to play with Atlético Nacional, winning Categoría Primera A. He later played for other Colombian clubs and for sides in Ecuador, Mexico and Equatorial Guinea.

Born and raised in Colombia to Colombian parents, Bermúdez officially played for the Colombia national under-20 team. He later appeared with the Equatorial Guinea national team, after people from the Central African nation liked of some of his football highlights on YouTube and contacted him via his Facebook fanpage.

== Club career ==
He played for LDU Loja in two editions of Copa Sudamericana (2012 and 2013).

== International career ==
Baermúdez was a starter for Colombia in the 2007 South American U-20 Championship.

In May 2013, Bermúdez was purchased by the Equatoguinean football team, which then he began to represent, received Equatoguinean citizenship and getting €3,000 for each match played.

=== International goal ===
Scores and results list Equatorial Guinea's goal tally first, score column indicates score after each Bermúdez goal.

List of international goals scored by Bermúdez
| No. | Date | Venue | Opponent | Score | Result | Competition |
|---|---|---|---|---|---|---|
| 1 | 16 November 2013 | Estadio de Malabo, Malabo, Equatorial Guinea | Spain | 1–1 | 1–2 | Friendly match |

=== Controversy about eligibility ===
Bermúdez recognizes that he is not of Equatorial Guinean descent, but considers he can represent the African country as he has not played for Colombia at senior level. According to FIFA's rules, footballers should be holders of the second nationality at the time of playing youth international matches with the original country. This rule has already been applied in the similar case of Portuguese-based Brazilian footballer Fernando. Additionally, when Bermúdez made his international debut with Equatorial Guinea, on 8 June 2013, he had spent his entire club career in Colombia and Ecuador. This aspect violated, thus, the condition D of the relevant current FIFA statute about the eligibility of a player, Article 17: Acquisition of a new nationality, which says: «He has lived continuously for at least five years after reaching the age of 18 on the territory of the relevant Association». Bermúdez was never punished by any of these two situations.
