= Eduardo Blandón =

Colombian footballer (born 1985)

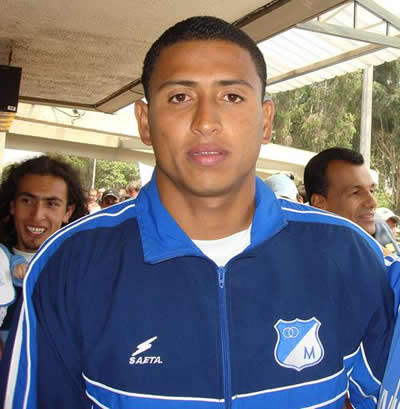

Personal information
- Full name: Eduardo de Jesús Blandón Morales
- Date of birth: 12 November 1985 (age 40)
- Place of birth: Los Córdobas, Colombia
- Height: 1.82 m (6 ft 0 in)
- Position: Goalkeeper

Youth career
- Envigado

Senior career*
Years	Team	Apps	(Gls)
2003	Envigado		
2004–2005	Bajo Cauca		
2006	Ferro Carril Oeste		
2006–2008	Millonarios	37	(8)
2008–2010	Atlético Nacional	36	(0)
2011	Boyacá Chico	28	(0)
2012–2013	América de Cali	10	(0)
2014–2015	Deportes Quindío	6	(0)
- * Club domestic league appearances and goals

Eduardo de Jesús Blandón Morales (born 12 November 1985) is a former Colombian football player. After a great Sudamericana tournament in 2007, Atlético Nacional bought him to replace David Ospina that was transferred to play in France.
