= Carlos Villagra =

Paraguayan footballer (born 1976)

Personal information
- Full name: Carlos Wilson Villagra Medina
- Date of birth: 22 August 1976 (age 50)
- Place of birth: Asunción, Paraguay
- Height: 1.83 m (6 ft 0 in)
- Position: Forward

Senior career*
Years	Team	Apps	(Gls)
1996	Club Libertad	16	(3)
1996–1997	Cerro Porteño	19	(6)
1998	Sportivo Luqueño	8	(1)
1999	Coquimbo Unido	?	(?)
1999–2000	12 de Octubre	3	(0)
2001	Club Libertad	12	(5)
2002–2003	CSD Municipal	14	(4)
2004	Nacional Asunción	19	(6)
2004	LDU Quito	20	(6)
2005	Oriente Petrolero	37	(13)
2006	Deportivo Pasto	44	(19)
2007	Millonarios	33	(12)
2008	Atlético Nacional	18	(5)
2009	Cerro Porteño	10	(1)
2009	Sportivo Luqueño	19	(3)
2010	Atlético Huila	21	(3)
2010	Deportes Quindío	15	(3)
2011	Deportivo Pereira	16	(5)
2011	Deportivo Pasto	24	(5)
2012	Sportivo Luqueño	5	(0)

International career
	Paraguay	1	(0)
- * Club domestic league appearances and goals as of 13 November 2012

Carlos Villagra (born 22 August 1976) is a Paraguayan football forward.

== Club career ==
Villagra previously played for Libertad, Cerro Porteño, Sportivo Luqueño, and 12 de Octubre in Paraguay. He has usually spent his time in Colombia with Deportivo Pasto, Millonarios, Atlético Nacional, Atlético Huila, and Deportes Quindío in his 30s.

He has also played for CSD Municipal of Peru LDU Quito of Ecuador, as well as Oriente Petrolero of Bolivia.

=== Honors ===
Title	Club	Country	Year
Torneo Clausura	Cerro Porteño	Paraguay	1996
Torneo Apertura	Cerro Porteño	Paraguay	1997
2006-I Copa Mustang	Deportivo Pasto	Colombia	2006
