= Jarol Martínez =

Colombian footballer (born 1987)

Jarol Martinez
Personal information
- Full name: Járol Enrique Martínez González
- Date of birth: March 22, 1987 (age 39)
- Place of birth: Quibdó, Chocó, Colombia
- Height: 1.75 m (5 ft 9 in)
- Position: Full back

Team information
- Current team: Boyacá Chicó
- Number: 27

Youth career
- Atlético Nacional

Senior career*
Years	Team	Apps	(Gls)
2005–2009	Atlético Nacional	3	(0)
2009–2011	Deportivo Cali	40	(2)
2011–2013	Millonarios	79	(0)
2014	Atlético Huila	25	(0)
2015	Deportivo Pasto	9	(0)
2015–2016	Atlético Bucaramanga	34	(0)
2016–2017	América de Cali	28	(0)
2018	Deportivo Pereira	4	(0)
2019–	Boyacá Chicó	48	(0)
- * Club domestic league appearances and goals as of 11:37, 27 October 2020 (UTC)

Járol Enrique Martínez González, or, simply, Járol Martínez (born March 22, 1987), is a Colombian footballer who currently plays as a full back for Boyacá Chicó.

== Career ==
Martínez can play as a right back or defensive midfielder. He was a starter on the Colombia national under-20 football team that failed to qualify for the 2007 World Cup. However, his performances caught the eye of Udinese, which bought him in February 2007 but backed out after he got injured at the end of the season in the Copa Mustang 1 2007. He was also one of the starters in Nacional's 2007 Colombian league victory. In July 2009, he signed with Deportivo Cali.
