= Diego Toro =

Colombian footballer (born 1982)

Diego Mauricio Toro Arcila (born January 29, 1982) is a Colombian footballer.

== Club career ==
Born in Medellín, Antioquia, Toro began playing professionally as a defensive midfielder with Atlético Nacional in 2000. He has also played as a central defender for Categoría Primera A sides Deportivo Pereira, Deportivo Pasto and Real Cartagena. After six months out of contract, he debuted in the second division with Envigado in September 2011. Toro had a brief spell in the Chinese Super League with Beijing Guoan, and signed with Patriotas in 2012.

== International career ==
He has been capped for the Colombian sub 17 and sub 20 teams, and was also a member of the Pre Selección Sub 23 Pre Olímpica.
