= Julián Andrés Díaz =

Colombian footballer (born 1989)

Personal information
- Full name: Julián Andrés Díaz Villamil
- Date of birth: January 21, 1989 (age 37)
- Place of birth: Medellín, Colombia
- Height: 1.80 m (5 ft 11 in)
- Position: Defender

Team information
- Current team: Atlético Nacional

Youth career
- Atlético Nacional

Senior career*
Years	Team	Apps	(Gls)
2008–2010	Atlético Nacional	1	(0)
- * Club domestic league appearances and goals as of 23 June 2008

Julián Andrés Díaz Villamil (born in Quibdó, Chocó. January 21, 1989) is a retired Colombian footballer.

He can play as right back or defensive midfielder. He is also a member of the Colombian Youth National team and was recently promoted to the Athletico Nacional first team.
