= Daniel Arango =

American painter

- Born: Barranquilla, Colombia
- Occupation: Artist

Daniel Arango is a New York-based artist. He was born in Barranquilla, Colombia in 1982, and at age three his family fled Colombia’s civil war and moved permanently to Miami Beach, Florida, United States. He studied architecture and interior design, receiving a Master of Fine Arts degree in painting from Rhode Island School of Design in Providence, Rhode Island.

== Style and influences ==
Arango’s latest collection documents two months spent wandering through the Metropolitan Museum of Art in search of inspiration, the culmination of a three-year journey around the world, after which he returned to New York.

Daniel's previous work fits into the overarching project he calls the "Holy K movement" (a satirical play on the Kellogg’s brand cereal). The process involves migrating organically from city to city and creating a work for a selected individual, known in his project as a 'Disciple'. Arango says that structured travel is the inspirational source for his work and broadens the scope of his influence.

"Twelve Apostles"

Twelve Apostles is a large-scale drawing made with inkjet on canvas to create a complexly layered scene, juxtaposing modern images against not only historical and contemporary building facades, but the medium of tapestries as well. The influence of architectonics is also integral to the finished work. Arango values structure and intends for it to be a "departure point from which a freer imagining of form and structure may be conjured." He has cited his Catholic upbringing as the source for his interest in religion, as well as being influenced by Aubrey Beardsley and the Art Nouveau movement and Belgian artist Wim Delvoye, whose work also explores the dynamics of the visceral workings of biological consumption.

"Airport Security Checkpoint"

Airport Security Checkpoint employs Persian motifs to explore the initiation process by which he names "Followers" (art collaborators). Although the work is in black and white, Arango states that it is left monochromatic for the viewer, speaking to the disparity of what modern viewers see and what original artwork was (classical buildings, frescoes, sculpture etc. were vividly colored), and how this change over time mythologizes art.

Daniel also has produced a number of short video pieces documenting his process and experience. His work has been featured in the book Petite Mort: Recollections of a Queer Public. The book was conceived as an "atlas of queer affection" and assembles contributions from an intergenerational group of gay men in New York. The book itself was intended to "remind us that public sex is not exclusively about a personal pursuit of pleasure" and in fact contain the "seeds of historical social and political action". Arango's work was an AutoCAD drawing titled "Summer Day on a Lower East Side Fire Escape".

Paintings

- Twelve Apostles, 2010
- Airport Security Checkpoint, 2010
- Top, 2010
- Sexy Beach Chairs, 2010
- Fernando, 2009
- Finger, 2009
- Hybrid, 2010
- Penis, 2010
- Special K, 2010
- Eric are you there?, 2005
- We could just try, 2006

Installations

- Chapel, 2009
- Confessional, 2009

=== Works on Display ===
In addition to Arango's works being in private collections around the world (USA, Colombia, Norway, Russia, Australia, Thailand, France, Spain), Daniel has also donated works or been asked to donate works to charities such as ACRIA and Young AFIKIM and the St. Jude Children's Research Hospital.

Arango also created a series of cereal boxes inspired by celebrities titled Holy K Celebrities Cereal. He took popular icons such as, Marilyn Monroe, Chiara Ferragni, Miley Cyrus, Lady Gaga, Beyoncé, James Dean, James Franco, Justin Bieber and Matthew McConaughey; and turned them into cereal flavors.

== Sources ==
- Daniel Arango - Official Website
- Holy K by Daniel Arango, The Gentleman Blogger, August 4, 2012
- Daniel Arango’s Holy K Box, Studio Irresistible, April 26, 2012
- Artist Daniel Arango and his Holy K movement, Lonely Planet, April 12, 2012
- Artist Daniel Arango and his Holy K movement, I Prefer Paris, April 12, 2012
- Art Seen video on Come and Get It!, the bare square, March 2012
- Responding to the call, Bangkok Post, February 15, 2012
- Daniel Arango Artist’s File, Luxe IMMO no °20, February 2012
- Holy K movement, EDDICE, February 2012
- Daniel Arango: The Higher Power of the Holy K, Curbs and Stoops, October 9, 2011
- Featured Artist Daniel Arango, Curbs and Stoops, April 27, 2011
- Matthew Zorpas Reports, Un Nouveau Ideal by Filep Motwary, August 3, 2010
