= Felipe Chará =

Colombian footballer (born 1981)

Personal information
- Full name: Luis Felipe Chará Zamora
- Date of birth: January 6, 1981 (age 45)
- Place of birth: Cali, Colombia
- Position: Defensive midfielder

Youth career
- Boca Juniors de Cali

Senior career*
Years	Team	Apps	(Gls)
- Deportivo Pereira
- Atlético Nacional
- Deportivo Cali

International career
- Colombia U21
- * Club domestic league appearances and goals

Luis Felipe Chará Zamora (Note: In this Spanish name, the first or paternal surname is Chará and the second or maternal family name is Zamora.) (born 6 January 1981), known as Felipe Chará, is a Colombian footballer who plays in Venezuela for Atlético Club Mineros de Guayana.

== Career ==
Born in Cali, Chará began his football career with the youth side of Boca Juniors de Cali. He turned professional with Deportivo Pereira before moving to Atlético Nacional for several years. Next, he returned to his home-town club, Deportivo Cali.

He can play as a defensive midfielder. He has been capped for the Colombian sub 17 and sub 20 and sub 21.

== Personal ==
Chará's brother, Diego Chará, is also a professional footballer who played for Deportivo Cali's rivals América de Cali. Diego currently plays for the Portland Timbers of Major League Soccer. Chará's other brother, Yimmi Chará, also played professionally for Portland.
