= David Córdoba =

Colombian footballer (born 1980)

Personal information
- Full name: David Camilo Córdoba Rivera
- Date of birth: December 9, 1980 (age 45)
- Place of birth: Medellín, Antioquia, Colombia
- Height: 1.62 m (5 ft 4 in)
- Position: Midfielder

Senior career*
Years	Team	Apps	(Gls)
2001–2003	Centauros Villavicencio	0	(0)
2004–2007	Cúcuta Deportivo	0	(0)
2008–2010	Atlético Nacional	16	(1)
2009	→ Atlético Huila (loan)	5	(0)
2011–2012	Itagüí	54	(10)
2013	Atlético Huila	4	(0)
- * Club domestic league appearances and goals

David Camilo Córdoba Rivera (born December 12, 1980) is a retired Colombian footballer.

== Career ==
He debuted as a professional in 2001 playing for Centauros Villavicencio, because of great success with this club he was then transferred to Cúcuta Deportivo participating with them in Copa Libertadores. Later Atlético Nacional saw his potential later offering him a contract for two years.
