= José Amaya =

Colombian footballer (born 1980)

Personal information
- Full name: José Antonio Amaya Pardo
- Date of birth: July 16, 1980 (age 46)
- Place of birth: Barranquilla, Colombia
- Height: 1.71 m (5 ft 7 in)
- Position: Defensive midfielder

Team information
- Current team: Patriotas
- Number: 15

Senior career*
Years	Team	Apps	(Gls)
1999–2004	Atlético Junior	218	(4)
2005–2010	Atlético Nacional	192	(3)
2010–2011	Millonarios	14	(1)
2012	Barcelona	27	(4)
2013	Patriotas	10	(0)
2014–2015	Uniautónoma	45	(1)

International career^{‡}
2007–2008	Colombia	12	(0)
- * Club domestic league appearances and goals as of 13 December 2015 ‡ National team caps and goals as of 13 December 2015

José Antonio "Ringo" Amaya Pardo (born 16 July 1980) is a retired Colombian footballer.

Amaya, who played as a defensive midfielder, was capped with the Colombian U-20 squad before being part of the senior squad that took part in Copa America 2004.

After Colombia did poorly at Copa América 2007, Amaya was chosen to lead the midfield. His performances in international friendlies and World Cup Qualifiers attracted attention, and Amaya was signed for one season by Barcelona S.C. in the Spanish leagues.

Amaya has won the Copa Mustang four times, once with Atlético Junior and three times with Atlético Nacional.

== Statistics (Official games/Colombian Ligue and Colombian Cup) ==
(As of November 14, 2010)

Year	Team	Colombian Ligue Matches	Goals	Colombian Cup Matches	Goals	Total Matches	Total Goals
2010	Millonarios	14	1	8	1	22	2
Total	Millonarios	14	1	8	1	22	2
