= Carmelo Valencia =

Colombian footballer (born 1984)

Personal information
- Full name: Carmelo Enrique Valencia Chaverra
- Date of birth: 13 July 1984 (age 42)
- Place of birth: Tutunendo, Chocó, Colombia
- Height: 1.75 m (5 ft 9 in)
- Position: Forward

Team information
- Current team: Atlético Junior
- Number: 19

Senior career*
Years	Team	Apps	(Gls)
2003–2004	Atlético Nacional	12	(1)
2005	Real Cartagena	15	(4)
2005	Deportivo Pasto	17	(5)
2006–2008	Atlético Nacional	73	(16)
2009	Millonarios	39	(12)
2010	Ulsan Hyundai	20	(6)
2011–2012	Newells Old Boys	8	(1)
2012	La Equidad	45	(17)
2013–2014	Tianjin Teda	55	(23)
2015–2016	Beijing Enterprises Group	40	(15)
2017–2018	La Equidad	37	(13)
2018	America de Cali	9	(1)
2018–2019	Independiente Santa Fe	35	(5)
2019	Cucuta Deportivo	25	(10)
2020–2022	Atlético Junior	91	(14)
Total		521	(143)

International career
2007–2008	Colombia	3	(0)
- * Club domestic league appearances and goals as of 7 October 2022

Carmelo Enrique Valencia Chaverra (Latin American Spanish: [kaɾˈmelo βaˈlensja]; (Note: In isolation, Valencia is pronounced [baˈlensja].) born 13 July 1984) is a former Colombian soccer player who retired in Atlético Junior.

== Club career ==
Carmelo Valencia's greatest performance came in the 4–1 victory of Junior de Barranquilla “tu papá” against the #1 club in Copa Libertadores. He also played really well in the two games in which his team Atletico Nacional faced Atletico Huila for the 2007 Apertura National Championship Mustang Cup. He recorded the only goal in the game at Huila. In the second game he opened the score with a goal after the Huila defenders crashed into each other leading the way to Valencia putting Huila's championship hopes out of reach. The game ended 2-1 and the aggregate score was 3–1 in favor of the reigning champion Atletico Nacional. He then helped Nacional defend their title in the second semester finals versus La Equidad by scoring the first goal in a 3–0 defeat of the capital's team. He's now scored a combined three goals in Colombian Mustang Soccer finals.

Valencia gained notoriety for his public admission that he faked a foul which resulted in the sending off of an opponent, Santa Fe's Agustín Julio, during a league match on 25 April 2009. League officials banned Valencia for one match following their review of the play in the wake of his admission.

On 18 January 2010, Valencia signed for K-League club Ulsan Hyundai on a three-year contract for an undisclosed fee.

Valencia signed a contract with Chinese Super League side Tianjin Teda in February 2013.

In February 2015, Valencia transferred to China League One side Beijing Enterprises Group.

== Personal life ==
Valencia has a wife and a daughter.

== Career statistics ==
Appearances and goals by club, season and competition
Sex Club	Season	League			National Cup		Continental		Other		Total	
Sex Club	Season	Division	Apps	Goals	Apps	Goals	Apps	Goals	Apps	Goals	Apps	Goals
Real Cartagena	2005	Categoría Primera A	15	4	0	0	—		—		15	4
Deportivo Pasto	2005	Categoría Primera A	17	5	0	0	—		—		17	5
Atlético Nacional	2006	Categoría Primera A	16	2	0	0	—		—		16	2
Atlético Nacional	2007	Categoría Primera A	30	13	0	0	4	1	—		34	14
Atlético Nacional	2008	Categoría Primera A	27	1	0	0	4	1	—		31	2
Atlético Nacional	Total		73	16	0	0	8	2	—		81	18
Millonarios (loan)	2009	Categoría Primera A	39	12	0	0	—		—		39	12
Ulsan Hyundai	2010	K-League	20	6	1	0	—		4	2	25	8
Newells Old Boys	2011–12	Argentine Primera División	8	1	1	0	—		—		9	1
La Equidad	2012	Categoría Primera A	45	17	4	0	2	1	—		51	18
Tianjin Teda	2013	Chinese Super League	29	16	0	0	—		—		29	16
Tianjin Teda	2014	Chinese Super League	26	7	1	1	—		—		27	8
Tianjin Teda	Total		55	23	1	1	—		—		56	24
Beijing Enterprises Group	2015	China League One	30	14	5	1	—		—		35	15
Beijing Enterprises Group	2016	China League One	10	1	0	0	—		—		10	1
Beijing Enterprises Group	Total		40	15	5	1	—		—		45	16
La Equidad	2017	Categoría Primera A	37	13	5	3	—		—		42	16
America de Cali	2018	Categoría Primera A	9	1	—		1	0	—		10	1
Independiente Santa Fe	2018	Categoría Primera A	19	4	3	0	0	0	—		22	4
Independiente Santa Fe	2019	Categoría Primera A	16	1	3	1	—		—		19	2
Independiente Santa Fe	Total		35	5	6	1	0	0	—		41	6
Cucuta Deportivo	2019	Categoría Primera A	25	10	—		—		—		25	10
Atlético Junior	2020	Categoría Primera A	19	2	2	0	6	3	2	1	29	5
Atlético Junior	2021	Categoría Primera A	36	8	1	0	10	2	—		47	10
Atlético Junior	2022	Categoría Primera A	36	4	5	1	3	0	—		44	5
Atlético Junior	Total		91	14	8	1	19	5	2	1	120	21
Career total			509	142	31	7	30	8	6	3	576	160
