= León Muñoz =

Colombian footballer (born 1977)

Personal information
- Full name: León Darío Muñoz Hernández
- Date of birth: February 21, 1977 (age 49)
- Place of birth: Medellín, Colombia
- Height: 1.68 m (5 ft 6 in)
- Position: Striker

Senior career*
Years	Team	Apps	(Gls)
1995	Envigado FC		
1996–2000	Atlético Nacional	79	(21)
1999	→ Deportes Quindío (loan)	17	(5)
2000–2005	Palmeiras	140	(32)
2006	Coritiba	1	(0)
2007–2009	Atlético Nacional	18	(5)
2009	Millonarios	13	(4)
2010	Deportivo Pereira	11	(3)

International career
2004	Colombia	1	(0)
- * Club domestic league appearances and goals as of November 16, 2009

León Darío Muñoz Hernández (born February 21, 1977) is a Colombian former football player who was an outstanding player in his early career with Atlético Nacional and Palmeiras.
