= Jhon Valencia =

Colombian footballer (born 1982)

Personal information
- Full name: Jhon Jairo Valencia Ortíz
- Date of birth: March 27, 1982 (age 44)
- Place of birth: Medellín, Colombia
- Height: 1.80 m (5 ft 11 in)
- Position: Defensive midfielder

Team information
- Current team: Alianza Atlético
- Number: 14

Youth career
- Medellín

Senior career*
Years	Team	Apps	(Gls)
2004	Deportes Quindío		
2005	Deportivo Pereira		
2006–2007	Deportes Quindío		
2007–2008	América de Cali	85	(4)
2009–2010	Once Caldas	46	(3)
2011	Atlético Nacional	30	(2)
2012	Juan Aurich	33	(6)
2013	Santa Fe	25	(0)
2014	La Equidad	23	(1)
2015–2016	Alianza Atlético	13	(2)

International career
2010–2011	Colombia	7	(0)
- * Club domestic league appearances and goals

Jhon Jairo Valencia Ortíz (born 27 March 1982), is a Colombian football midfielder. He currently plays for Alianza Atlético in the Primera División Peruana.
