= 2007 Categoría Primera A season =

The 2007 Categoría Primera A season was the 60th season of Colombia's top-flight football league. Atlético Nacional won both the Apertura and Finalización tournaments.

== Campeonato Apertura ==
2007-I - Copa Mustang or Torneo Apertura 2007 is the 65th installment of the Mustang Cup. It began on February 4 with the opening match between Independiente Santa Fe and Atlético Junior in Fusagasugá at the Estadio Fernando Mazuera. The Estadio Nemesio Camacho "El Campín" was not used because was going through some repairs and modifications. 18 teams competed against one another and played each weekend until May 12. At that point, the top 8 teams in the league stage advanced to the group stage, each group with 4 teams. From that point on the teams played on a home and away basis, for a total of a six matches each. The winner of both groups at the end advanced to the home-and-away final.

=== Standings ===
Last updated May 12, 2008

| Pos | Team | Pts | GP | W | D | L | GF | GA | Dif |
|---|---|---|---|---|---|---|---|---|---|
| 1. | Deportivo Cali | 34 | 18 | 9 | 7 | 2 | 33 | 20 | +13 |
| 2. | Cúcuta Deportivo | 33 | 18 | 10 | 3 | 5 | 28 | 17 | +11 |
| 3. | Atlético Nacional | 32 | 18 | 9 | 5 | 4 | 32 | 20 | +12 |
| 4. | Millonarios | 30 | 18 | 8 | 6 | 4 | 26 | 17 | +9 |
| 5. | Boyacá Chicó | 30 | 18 | 9 | 3 | 6 | 20 | 16 | +4 |
| 6. | Independiente Medellín | 29 | 18 | 8 | 5 | 5 | 33 | 31 | +2 |
| 7. | Santa Fe | 29 | 18 | 8 | 5 | 5 | 23 | 21 | +2 |
| 8. | Atlético Huila | 28 | 18 | 9 | 1 | 8 | 24 | 23 | +1 |
| 9. | Atlético Bucaramanga | 27 | 18 | 7 | 6 | 5 | 23 | 21 | +2 |
| 10. | Deportivo Pasto | 23 | 18 | 6 | 5 | 7 | 19 | 21 | -2 |
| 11. | Atlético Junior | 23 | 18 | 5 | 8 | 5 | 22 | 26 | -4 |
| 12. | Deportes Tolima | 20 | 18 | 6 | 2 | 10 | 26 | 28 | -2 |
| 13. | América de Cali | 19 | 18 | 4 | 7 | 7 | 24 | 33 | -9 |
| 14. | Once Caldas | 18 | 18 | 4 | 6 | 8 | 18 | 25 | -7 |
| 15. | Deportes Quindío | 18 | 18 | 4 | 6 | 8 | 14 | 22 | -8 |
| 16. | Real Cartagena | 17 | 18 | 3 | 8 | 7 | 14 | 22 | -8 |
| 17. | Deportivo Pereira | 15 | 18 | 3 | 6 | 9 | 14 | 21 | -8 |
| 18. | La Equidad | 13 | 18 | 2 | 7 | 9 | 21 | 28 | -7 |

| Classified for semifinals |
| Eliminated |

==== Fixtures ====
Fixture 1 - February 4, 2007
| Home | Score | Away |
|---|---|---|
| Pereira | 1 - 1 | Bucaramanga |
| Boyacá Chicó | 2 - 1 | América de Cali |
| La Equidad | 3 - 4 | Atlético Nacional |
| Santa Fe | 0 - 0 | Junior |
| Huila | 2 - 3 | Tolima |
| Cartagena | 0 - 0 | Millonarios |
| Medellín | 2 - 1 | Pasto |
| Deportivo Cali | 3 - 2 | Quindío |
| Cúcuta | 4 - 1 | Once Caldas |

Fixture 2 - February 11, 2007
| Home | Score | Away |
|---|---|---|
| Once Caldas | 1 - 1 | Pereira |
| Quindío | 0 - 1 | Cúcuta |
| Pasto | 0 - 0 | Deportivo Cali |
| Millonarios | 5 - 1 (Note: Played March 21) | Medellín |
| Tolima | 0 - 0 | Cartagena |
| Junior | 2 - 1 | Huila |
| Atlético Nacional | 2 - 1 | Santa Fe |
| América de Cali | 1 - 1 | La Equidad |
| Bucaramanga | 2 - 1 | Boyacá Chicó |

Fixture 3 - February 18, 2007
| Home | Score | Away |
|---|---|---|
| Boyacá Chicó | 2 - 0 | Pereira |
| La Equidad | 1 - 1 | Bucaramanga |
| Santa Fe | 2 - 0 (Note: Played April 18) | América de Cali |
| Huila | 2 - 2 | Atlético Nacional |
| Cartagena | 1 - 1 | Junior |
| Medellín | 2 - 1 | Tolima |
| Deportivo Cali | 2 - 0 | Millonarios |
| Cúcuta | 2 - 0 | Pasto |
| Once Caldas | 1 - 0 | Quindío |

Fixture 4 - February 25, 2007
| Home | Score | Away |
|---|---|---|
| Pereira | 0 - 1 | Quindío |
| Pasto | 3 - 2 | Once Caldas |
| Millonarios | 1 - 1 (Note: Played March 8) | Cúcuta |
| Tolima | 1 - 1 | Deportivo Cali |
| Junior | 1 - 2 | Medellín |
| Atlético Nacional | 1 - 0 | Cartagena |
| América de Cali | 2 - 1 | Huila |
| Bucaramanga | 1 - 1 | Santa Fe |
| Boyacá Chicó | 0 - 0 | La Equidad |

Fixture 5 - March 4, 2007
| Home | Score | Away |
|---|---|---|
| La Equidad | 3 - 3 | Pereira |
| Santa Fe | 1 - 0 | Boyacá Chicó |
| Huila | 2 - 1 | Bucarramanga |
| Cartagena | 2 - 2 | América de Cali |
| Medellín | 2 - 2 | Atlético Nacional |
| Deportivo Cali | 4 - 1 | Junior |
| Cúcuta | 2 - 1 | Tolima |
| Once Caldas | 2 - 0 | Millonarios |
| Quindío | 2 - 0 | Pasto |

Fixture 6 - March 11, 2007
| Home | Score | Away |
|---|---|---|
| Pereira | 0 - 1 | Pasto |
| Millonarios | 1 - 1 | Quindío |
| Tolima | 3 - 1 | Once Caldas |
| Junior | 2 - 1 | Cúcuta |
| Atlético Nacional | 0 - 2 | Deportivo Cali |
| América de Cali | 1 - 1 | Medellín |
| Bucaramanga | 1 - 0 | Cartagena |
| Boyacá Chicó | 1 - 0 | Huila |
| La Equidad | 1 - 2 | Santa Fe |

Fixture 7 - March 18, 2007
| Home | Score | Away |
|---|---|---|
| Santa Fe | 2 - 0 | Pereira |
| Huila | 2 - 0 | La Equidad |
| Cartagena | 1 - 0 | Boyacá Chicó |
| Medellín | 1 - 2 | Bucaramanga |
| Deportivo Cali | 2 - 2 | América de Cali |
| Cúcuta | 1 - 1 | Atlético Nacional |
| Once Caldas | 1 - 1 | Junior |
| Quindío | 1 - 2 | Tolima |
| Pasto | 0 - 1 | Millonarios |

Fixture 8 - March 25, 2007
| Home | Score | Away |
|---|---|---|
| Pereira | 1 - 1 | Millonarios |
| Tolima | 1 - 2 | Pasto |
| Junior | 3 - 2 | Quindío |
| Atlético Nacional | 2 - 0 | Once Caldas |
| América de Cali | 1 - 2 | Cúcuta |
| Bucaramanga | 2 - 0 | Deportivo Cali |
| Boyacá Chicó | 2 - 1 | Medellín |
| La Equidad | 2 - 0 | Cartagena |
| Santa Fe | 1 - 0 | Huila |

Fixture 9 - April 1, 2007
| Home | Score | Away |
|---|---|---|
| Quindío | 1 - 2 | Boyacá Chicó |
| Pasto | 2 - 0 | La Equidad |
| Millonarios | 4 - 2 | Santa Fe |
| Tolima | 1 - 2 | Huila |
| Junior | 2 - 2 | Cartagena |
| Atlético Nacional | 2 - 2 | Medellín |
| América de Cali | 0 - 2 | Deportivo Cali |
| Bucaramanga | 1 - 2 | Cúcuta |
| Pereira | 0 - 0 | Once Caldas |

Fixture 10 - April 8, 2007
| Home | Score | Away |
|---|---|---|
| Huila | 1 - 0 | Pereira |
| Cartagena | 2 - 1 | Santa Fe |
| Medellín | 2 - 1 | La Equidad |
| Deportivo Cali | 2 - 2 | Boyacá Chicó |
| Cúcuta | 2 - 0 | Bucaramanga |
| Once Caldas | 2 - 3 | América de Cali |
| Quindío | 2 - 1 | Atlético Nacional |
| Pasto | 1 - 1 | Junior |
| Millonarios | 2 - 0 | Tolima |

Fixture 11 - April 11, 2007
| Home | Score | Away |
|---|---|---|
| Pereira | 2 - 0 | Tolima |
| Junior | 1 - 1 | Millonarios |
| Atlético Nacional | 1 - 1 | Pasto |
| América de Cali | 0 - 0 | Quindío |
| Bucaramanga | 0 - 0 | Once Caldas |
| Boyacá Chicó | 1 - 0 | Cúcuta |
| La Equidad | 0 - 1 | Deportivo Cali |
| Santa Fe | 2 - 4 | Medellín |
| Huila | 2 - 0 | Cartagena |

Fixture 12 - April 15, 2007
| Home | Score | Away |
|---|---|---|
| Cartagena | 1 - 1 | Pereira |
| Medellín | 1 - 3 | Huila |
| Deportivo Cali | 1 - 1 | Santa Fe |
| Cúcuta | 3 - 1 | La Equidad |
| Once Caldas | 1 - 0 | Boyacá Chicó |
| Quindío | 1 - 1 | Bucaramanga |
| Pasto | 2 - 2 | América de Cali |
| Millonarios | 0 - 1 | Atlético Nacional |
| Tolima | 2 - 1 | Junior |

Fixture 13 - April 22, 2007
| Home | Score | Away |
|---|---|---|
| Pereira | 0 - 1 | Junior |
| Atlético Nacional | 1 - 0 | Tolima |
| América de Cali | 2 - 2 | Millonarios |
| Bucaramanga | 1 - 0 | Pasto |
| Boyacá Chicó | 3 - 0 | Quindío |
| La Equidad | 0 - 0 | Once Caldas |
| Santa Fe | 3 - 3 | Cúcuta |
| Huila | 1 - 0 | Deportivo Cali |
| Cartagena | 2 - 2 | Medellín |

Fixture 14 - April 25, 2007
| Home | Score | Away |
|---|---|---|
| Medellín | 1 - 3 | Pereira |
| Deportivo Cali | 4 - 1 | Cartagena |
| Cúcuta | 2 - 0 | Huila |
| Once Caldas | 0 - 1 | Santa Fe |
| Quindío | 0 - 0 | La Equidad |
| Pasto | 1 - 1 | Boyacá Chicó |
| Millonarios | 2 - 1 | Bucaramanga |
| Tolima | 6 - 0 (Note: Played until minute 80 due to rain. The game was declared as finished because more than 75% was played. Nota de El Tiempo sobre el compromiso) | América de Cali |
| Junior | 2 - 1 | Atlético Nacional |

Fixture 15 - April 29, 2007
| Home | Score | Away |
|---|---|---|
| Pereira | 0 - 2 | Atlético Nacional |
| América de Cali | 3 - 1 | Junior |
| Bucaramanga | 3 - 1 | Tolima |
| Boyacá Chicó | 1 - 0 | Millonarios |
| La Equidad | 2 - 3 | Pasto |
| Santa Fe | 0 - 0 | Quindío |
| Huila | 3 - 2 | Once Caldas |
| Cartagena | 1 - 0 | Cúcuta |
| Medellín | 3 - 3 | Deportivo Cali |

Fixture 16 - May 2, 2007
| Home | Score | Away |
|---|---|---|
| Deportivo Cali | 2 - 1 | Pereira |
| Cúcuta | 0 - 1 | Medellín |
| Once Caldas | 2 - 1 | Cartagena |
| Quindío | 1 - 0 | Huila |
| Pasto | 0 - 1 | Santa Fe |
| Millonarios | 1 - 0 | La Equidad |
| Tolima | 2 - 0 | Boyacá Chicó |
| Junior | 0 - 0 | Bucaramanga |
| Atlético Nacional | 4 - 0 | América de Cali |

Fixture 17 - May 6, 2007
| Home | Score | Away |
|---|---|---|
| Pereira | 1 - 0 | América de Cali |
| Bucaramanga | 3 - 2 | Atlético Nacional |
| Boyacá Chicó | 2 - 0 | Junior |
| La Equidad | 4 - 1 | Tolima |
| Santa Fe | 1 - 2 | Millonarios |
| Huila | 2 - 1 | Pasto |
| Cartagena | 0 - 0 | Quindío |
| Medellín | 1 - 0 | Once Caldas |
| Deportivo Cali | 2 - 1 | Cúcuta |

Fixture 18 - May 12, 2007
| Home | Score | Away |
|---|---|---|
| Cúcuta | 1 - 0 | Pereira |
| Once Caldas | 2 - 2 | Deportivo Cali |
| Quindío | 0 - 4 | Medellín |
| Pasto | 1 - 0 | Cartagena |
| Millonarios | 3 - 0 | Huila |
| Junior | 2 - 2 | La Equidad |
| Tolima | 1 - 2 | Santa Fe |
| Nacional | 3 - 0 | Boyacá Chicó |
| América de Cali | 4 - 2 | Bucaramanga |

=== Quadrangular Semifinals ===
The second phase of the Torneo Apertura 2007 consists in a quadrangular semifinal. This will be disputed by the best eight teams, later distributed in two groups of four teams, divided by odds and evens. The winners of each group will face each other in the Finals to define a champion.

==== Group A ====
| R | Pos | Team | Pts | GP | W | D | L | GF | GA | Dif |
|---|---|---|---|---|---|---|---|---|---|---|
| (3) | 1. | Atlético Nacional | 13 | 6 | 4 | 1 | 1 | 12 | 4 | +8 |
| (1) | 2. | Deportivo Cali | 11 | 6 | 3 | 2 | 1 | 8 | 6 | +2 |
| (5) | 3. | Boyacá Chicó | 6 | 6 | 2 | 0 | 4 | 10 | 12 | -2 |
| (7) | 4. | Santa Fe | 4 | 6 | 1 | 1 | 4 | 4 | 12 | -8 |

Fixture 1 - May 16, 2007
| Home | Score | Away |
|---|---|---|
| Atlético Nacional | 3 - 0 | Boyacá Chicó |
| Deportivo Cali | 2 - 0 | Santa Fe |

Fixture 2 - May 20, 2007
| Home | Score | Away |
|---|---|---|
| Boyacá Chicó | 1 - 2 | Deportivo Cali |
| Santa Fe | 1 - 0 | Atlético Nacional |

Fixture 3 - May 23, 2007
| Home | Score | Away |
|---|---|---|
| Atlético Nacional | 3 - 0 | Deportivo Cali |
| Boyacá Chicó | 5 - 1 | Santa Fe |

Fixture 4 - May 27, 2007
| Home | Score | Away |
|---|---|---|
| Santa Fe | 0 - 1 | Boyacá Chicó |
| Deportivo Cali | 0 - 0 | Atlético Nacional |

Fixture 5 - June 3, 2007
| Home | Score | Away |
|---|---|---|
| Deportivo Cali | 2 - 1 | Boyacá Chicó |
| Atlético Nacional | 3 - 1 | Santa Fe |

Fixture 6 - June 10, 2007
| Home | Score | Away |
|---|---|---|
| Boyacá Chicó | 2 - 3 | Atlético Nacional |
| Santa Fe | 1 - 1 | Deportivo Cali |

==== Group B ====
| R | Pos | Team | Pts | Gp | W | D | L | GF | GA | Dif |
|---|---|---|---|---|---|---|---|---|---|---|
| (8) | 1. | Atlético Huila | 11 | 6 | 3 | 2 | 1 | 8 | 8 | 0 |
| (2) | 2. | Cúcuta Deportivo | 9 | 6 | 2 | 3 | 1 | 9 | 5 | +4 |
| (4) | 3. | Millonarios | 9 | 6 | 3 | 0 | 3 | 7 | 8 | -1 |
| (6) | 4. | Independiente Medellín | 3 | 6 | 0 | 3 | 3 | 6 | 9 | -3 |

Fecha 1 - May 16, 2007
| Home | Score | Away |
|---|---|---|
| Cúcuta | 1 - 1 | Medellín |
| Millonarios | 0 - 1 | Huila |

Fixture 2 - May 20, 2007
| Home | Score | Away |
|---|---|---|
| Huila | 1 - 1 | Cúcuta |
| Medellín | 2 - 3 | Millonarios |

Fixture 3 - May 23, 2007
| Home | Score | Away |
|---|---|---|
| Huila | 1 - 0 | Medellín |
| Millonarios | 2 - 0 | Cúcuta |

Fixture 4 - May 27, 2007
| Home | Score | Away |
|---|---|---|
| Medellín | 3 - 3 | Huila |
| Cúcuta | 3 - 1 | Millonarios |

Fixture 5 - June 3, 2007
| Home | Score | Away |
|---|---|---|
| Cúcuta | 4 - 0 | Huila |
| Millonarios | 1 - 0 | Medellín |

Fixture 6- June 10, 2007
| Home | Score | Away |
|---|---|---|
| Huila | 2 - 0 | Millonarios |
| Medellín | 0 - 0 | Cúcuta |

=== Final ===
| Date | City | Home | Score | Away |
|---|---|---|---|---|
| June 13 | Neiva | Atlético Huila | 0 - 1 | Atlético Nacional |
| June 17 | Medellín | Atlético Nacional | 2 - 1 | Atlético Huila |
Atlético Nacional Champion with an aggregate score of 3-1.

== Campeonato Finalización ==
2007-II - Copa Mustang or Torneo Finalización 2007 was the 63rd installment of the Mustang Cup. It began on July 15, 2007 and ended on December 19, 2007.18 teams compete against one another and played each weekend until November 12. At that point, the top 8 teams in the league stage advanced to the group stage, each group with 4 teams. From that point on the teams play on a home and away basis, for a total of a six matches each. The winner of both groups at the end advance to the home-and-away final.

=== Standings ===
| Pos | Team | Pts | GP | W | D | L | GF | GA | Dif |
|---|---|---|---|---|---|---|---|---|---|
| 1. | Atlético Nacional | 38 | 18 | 11 | 5 | 2 | 28 | 12 | +16 |
| 2. | La Equidad | 34 | 18 | 10 | 4 | 4 | 27 | 18 | +9 |
| 3. | América de Cali | 34 | 18 | 10 | 4 | 4 | 23 | 15 | +8 |
| 4. | Deportes Tolima | 33 | 18 | 10 | 3 | 5 | 26 | 17 | +9 |
| 5. | Cúcuta Deportivo | 32 | 18 | 9 | 5 | 4 | 30 | 19 | +11 |
| 6. | Deportivo Pasto | 30 | 18 | 8 | 6 | 4 | 28 | 16 | +12 |
| 7. | Once Caldas | 29 | 18 | 8 | 5 | 5 | 29 | 22 | +7 |
| 8. | Boyacá Chicó | 27 | 18 | 7 | 6 | 5 | 20 | 18 | +2 |
| 9. | Deportes Quindío | 26 | 18 | 8 | 2 | 8 | 29 | 27 | +2 |
| 10. | Independiente Medellín | 25 | 18 | 8 | 1 | 9 | 22 | 25 | -3 |
| 11. | Millonarios | 20 | 18 | 5 | 5 | 8 | 18 | 28 | -10 |
| 12. | Deportivo Cali | 18 | 18 | 3 | 9 | 6 | 18 | 20 | -2 |
| 13. | Atlético Junior | 18 | 18 | 5 | 3 | 10 | 17 | 28 | -11 |
| 14. | Atlético Bucaramanga | 17 | 18 | 5 | 2 | 11 | 20 | 28 | -8 |
| 15. | Atlético Huila | 17 | 18 | 3 | 8 | 7 | 17 | 27 | -10 |
| 16. | Deportivo Pereira | 17 | 18 | 3 | 8 | 7 | 15 | 25 | -10 |
| 17. | Real Cartagena | 13 | 18 | 3 | 5 | 10 | 16 | 25 | -9 |
| 18. | Independiente Santa Fe | 13 | 18 | 2 | 7 | 9 | 16 | 30 | -14 |

| Qualified for semifinals. |
| Eliminated. |
| Relegated. |

==== Fixtures ====
Fixture 1 - July 22, 2007
| Home | Score | Away |
|---|---|---|
| Once Caldas | 1 - 0 | Cúcuta |
| Atlético Nacional | 0 - 0 | La Equidad |
| Junior | 2 - 1 | Santa Fe |
| América de Cali | 1 - 2 | Boyaca Chicó |
| Pasto | 1 - 0 | Medellín |
| Bucaramanga | 0 - 1 | Pereira |
| Millonarios | 1 - 0 | Real Cartagena |
| Tolima | 3 - 0 | Huila |
| Quindío | 1 - 1 (Note: Was played on August 8, 2007. Noticia en Futbolred.com) | Deportivo Cali |

Fixture 22 - July 29, 2007
| Home | Score | Away |
|---|---|---|
| Santa Fe | 0 - 2 | Atlético Nacional |
| Huila | 1 - 0 | Junior |
| La Equidad | 1 - 0 | América de Cali |
| Boyaca Chicó | 1 - 1 | Bucaramanga |
| Pereira | 0 - 3 | Once Caldas |
| Cúcuta | 2 - 0 | Quindío |
| Real Cartagena | 1 - 0 | Tolima |
| Deportivo Cali | 4 - 4 | Pasto |
| Medellín | 2 - 1 | Millonarios |

Fixture 3 - August 5, 2007
| Home | Score | Away |
|---|---|---|
| América de Cali | 3 - 2 | Santa Fe |
| Quindío | 1 - 2 | Once Caldas |
| Bucaramanga | 1 - 2 | La Equidad |
| Pereira | 0 - 1 | Boyaca Chicó |
| Junior | 4 - 2 | Real Cartagena |
| Tolima | 4 - 2 | Medellín |
| Pasto | 3 - 0 | Cúcuta |
| Atlético Nacional | 3 - 2 | Huila |
| Millonarios | 1 - 2 | Deportivo Cali |

Fixture 4- August 12, 2007
| Home | Score | Away |
|---|---|---|
| Cúcuta | 2 - 2 | Millonarios |
| Once Caldas | 2 - 3 | Pasto |
| Santa Fe | 4 - 1 | Bucaramanga |
| Quindío | 3 - 1 | Pereira |
| Cartagena | 0 - 2 | Atlético Nacional |
| Huila | 1 - 1 | América de Cali |
| La Equidad | 3 - 1 | Boyacá Chicó |
| Deportivo Cali | 1 - 2 | Tolima |
| Medellín | 3 - 1 | Junior |

Fixture 5 - August 19, 2007
| Home | Score | Away |
|---|---|---|
| Tolima | 2 - 0 | Cúcuta |
| Millonarios | 1 - 2 | Once Caldas |
| América | 1 - 0 | Cartagena |
| Junior | 2 - 1 | Deportivo Cali |
| Pereira | 2 - 2 | La Equidad |
| Boyacá Chicó | 0 - 1 | Santa Fe |
| Bucaramanga | 5 - 0 | Huila |
| Pasto | 1 - 2 | Quindío |
| Atlético Nacional | 1 - 0 | Medellín |

Fixture 6 - August 26, 2007
| Home | Score | Away |
|---|---|---|
| Medellín | 1 - 3 | América de Cali |
| Deportivo Cali | 1 - 1 | Atlético Nacional |
| Once Caldas | 0 - 1 | Tolima |
| Santa Fe | 1 - 2 | La Equidad |
| Pasto | 1 - 1 | Pereira |
| Cúcuta | 2 - 0 | Junior |
| Cartagena | 3 - 1 | Bucaramanga |
| Huila | 0 - 0 | Boyacá Chicó |
| Quindío | 6 - 1 | Millonarios |

Fixture 7 - September 2, 2007
| Home | Score | Away |
|---|---|---|
| Pereira | 2 - 2 | Santa Fe |
| América de Cali | 0 - 0 | Deportivo Cali |
| Millonarios | 0 - 3 | Pasto |
| Junior | 4 - 2 | Once Caldas |
| La Equidad | 2 - 1 | Huila |
| Boyacá Chicó | 1 - 1 | Cartagena |
| Bucaramanga | 0 - 2 | Medellín |
| Tolima | 1 - 1 | Quindío |
| Atlético Nacional | 0 - 1 | Cúcuta |

Fixture 8 - September 9, 2007
| Home | Score | Away |
|---|---|---|
| Medellín | 0 - 2 | Boyacá Chicó |
| Deportivo Cali | 1 - 1 | Bucaramanga |
| Cúcuta | 2 - 0 | América de Cali |
| Millonarios | 1 - 0 | Pereira |
| Quindío | 1 - 0 | Junior |
| Cartagena | 1 - 2 | La Equidad |
| Huila | 0 - 0 | Santa Fe |
| Once Caldas | 2 - 2 | Atlético Nacional |
| Pasto | 2 - 0 (Note: Played on Wednesday, October 3) | Tolima |

Fixture 9 - September 16, 2007
| Home | Score | Away |
|---|---|---|
| Once Caldas | 2 - 2 | Pereira |
| Deportivo Cali | 0 - 1 | América de Cali |
| Cartagena | 1 - 0 | Junior |
| Medellín | 1 - 4 | Atlético Nacional |
| Boyacá Chicó | 1 - 0 | Quindío |
| La Equidad | 0 - 0 | Pasto |
| Huila | 3 - 0 | Tolima |
| Cúcuta | 3 - 1 | Bucaramanga |
| Santa Fe | 0 - 1 | Millonarios |

Fixture 10 - September 23, 2007
| Home | Score | Away |
|---|---|---|
| Boyacá Chicó | 1 - 1 | Deportivo Cali |
| La Equidad | 0 - 1 | Medellín |
| Tolima | 0 - 0 | Millonarios |
| América de Cali | 2 - 2 | Once Caldas |
| Pereira | 0 - 0 | Huila |
| Santa Fe | 1 - 1 | Cartagena |
| Bucaramanga | 1 - 2 | Cúcuta |
| Junior | 1 - 0 | Pasto |
| Atlético Nacional | 2 - 1 | Quindío |

Fixture 11 - September 30, 2007
| Equipo Local | Resultado | Equipo Visitante |
|---|---|---|
| Tolima | 3 - 0 | Pereira |
| Quindío | 0 - 2 | América de Cali |
| Medellín | 2 - 0 | Santa Fe |
| Cartagena | 1 - 2 | Huila |
| Cúcuta | 5 - 1 | Boyacá Chicó |
| Deportivo Cali | 0 - 1 | La Equidad |
| Millonarios | 2 - 0 | Junior |
| Once Caldas | 1 - 0 | Bucaramanga |
| Pasto | 0 - 1 | Atlético Nacional |

Fixture 12 - October 7, 2007
| Home | Score | Away |
|---|---|---|
| Pereira | 1 - 1 | Cartagena |
| América de Cali | 1 - 0 | Pasto |
| Huila | 0 - 3 | Medellín |
| Santa Fe | 0 - 0 | Deportivo Cali |
| La Equidad | 1 - 0 | Cúcuta |
| Boyacá Chicó | 1 - 0 | Once Caldas |
| Bucaramanga | 3 - 2 | Quindío |
| Junior | 1 - 2 | Tolima |
| Atlético Nacional | 3 - 0 | Millonarios |

Fixture 13 - October 21, 2007
| Home | Score | Away |
|---|---|---|
| Quindío | 1 - 5 | Boyacá Chicó |
| Millonarios | 1 - 2 | América de Cali |
| Once Caldas | 2 - 1 | La Equidad |
| Medellín | 1 - 0 | Cartagena |
| Junior | 0 - 0 | Pereira |
| Pasto | 2 - 0 | Bucaramanga |
| Cúcuta | 4 - 1 | Santa Fe |
| Deportivo Cali | 2 - 2 | Huila |
| Tolima | 2 - 1 | Atlético Nacional |

Fixture 14 - October 25, 2007
| Home | Score | Away |
|---|---|---|
| La Equidad | 2 - 1 | Quindío |
| Bucaramanga | 1 - 0 | Millonarios |
| Atlético Nacional | 0 - 0 | Junior |
| Pereira | 2 - 0 | Medellín |
| Cartagena | 0 - 2 | Deportivo Cali |
| Huila | 2 - 2 | Cúcuta |
| Santa Fe | 0 - 4 | Once Caldas |
| Boyacá Chicó | 0 - 0 | Pasto |
| América de Cali | 1 - 0 | Tolima |

Fixture 15 - October 31, 2007
| Home | Score | Away |
|---|---|---|
| Atlético Nacional | 2 - 0 | Pereira |
| Junior | 1 - 3 | América de Cali |
| Tolima | 3 - 1 | Bucaramanga |
| Millonarios | 2 - 1 | Boyacá Chicó |
| Quindío | 3 - 0 | Santa Fe |
| Once Caldas | 2 - 2 | Huila |
| Cúcuta | 1 - 0 | Cartagena |
| Deportivo Cali | 0 - 1 | Medellín |
| Pasto | 4 - 1 (Note: Was Played on November 1. Noticia de Futbolred.com) | La Equidad |

Fixture 16 - November 4, 2007
| Home | Score | Away |
|---|---|---|
| América de Cali | 1 - 1 | Atlético Nacional |
| Boyacá Chicó | 1 - 0 | Tolima |
| La Equidad | 1 - 1 | Millonarios |
| Santa Fe | 0 - 0 | Pasto |
| Pereira | 1 - 0 | Deportivo Cali |
| Cartagena | 1 - 1 | Once Caldas |
| Huila | 0 - 1 | Quindío |
| Bucaramanga | 2 - 1 | Junior |
| Medellín | 1 - 1 | Cúcuta |

Fixture 17 - November 7, 2007
| Home | Score | Away |
|---|---|---|
| América de Cali | 2 - 0 | Pereira |
| Atlético Nacional | 1 - 0 | Bucaramanga |
| Junior | 0 - 0 | Boyacá Chicó |
| Tolima | 2 - 1 | La Equidad |
| Pasto | 1 - 0 | Huila |
| Quindío | 1 - 0 | Cartagena |
| Once Caldas | 1 - 0 | Medellín |
| Cúcuta | 1 - 1 | Deportivo Cali |
| Millonarios | 2 - 2 | Santa Fe |

Fixture 18 - November 11, 2007
| Home | Score | Away |
|---|---|---|
| Huila | 1 - 1 | Millonarios |
| Boyacá Chicó | 1 - 2 | Atlético Nacional |
| Medellín | 3 - 4 | Quindío |
| Deportivo Cali | 1 - 0 | Once Caldas |
| Cartagena | 3 - 3 | Pasto |
| La Equidad | 5 - 0 | Junior |
| Santa Fe | 1 - 1 | Tolima |
| Pereira | 2 - 2 | Cúcuta |
| Bucaramanga | 1 - 0 | América de Cali |

=== Quadrangular Semifinals ===
The second phase of the 2007 Final Tournament takes two groups of four teams. It is disputed between the best eight teams in the first phase, later they are distributed in two groups of four by groups being divided by odd and even numbers. The winners of each group will advance to the Finals to define a champion.

==== Group A ====
| R | Pos | Team | Pts | GP | W | D | L | GF | GA | Dif |
|---|---|---|---|---|---|---|---|---|---|---|
| (1) | 1. | Atlético Nacional | 11 | 6 | 3 | 2 | 1 | 8 | 5 | +3 |
| (3) | 2. | América de Cali | 10 | 6 | 3 | 1 | 2 | 6 | 6 | - |
| (7) | 3. | Once Caldas | 7 | 6 | 2 | 1 | 3 | 4 | 5 | -1 |
| (5) | 4. | Cúcuta Deportivo | 5 | 6 | 1 | 2 | 3 | 6 | 8 | -2 |

R=Classification in second phase; Pts=Points; GP=Games played; W=Win; D=Tied; L=Lost; GF=Goals Favored; GA=Goals Allowed; DIF=Difference

Fixture 1 - November 25, 2007
| Home | Score | Away |
|---|---|---|
| América de Cali | 1 - 0 | Cúcuta |
| Atlético Nacional | 1 - 0 | Once Caldas |

Fixture 2 - November 28, 2007
| Home | Score | Away |
|---|---|---|
| Cúcuta | 1 - 2 | Atlético Nacional |
| Once Caldas | 1 - 0 | América de Cali |

Fixture 3 - December 2, 2007
| Home | Score | Away |
|---|---|---|
| América de Cali | 2 - 1 | Atlético Nacional |
| Cúcuta | 0 - 1 | Once Caldas |

Fixture 4 - December 5, 2007
| Home | Score | Away |
|---|---|---|
| Once Caldas | 1 - 2 | Cúcuta |
| Atlético Nacional | 2 - 0 | América de Cali |

Fixture 5 - December 9, 2007
| Home | Score | Away |
|---|---|---|
| Atlético Nacional | 2 - 2 | Cúcuta |
| América de Cali | 2 - 1 | Once Caldas |

Fixture 6 - December 12, 2007
| Home | Score | Away |
|---|---|---|
| Cúcuta | 1 - 1 | América de Cali |
| Once Caldas | 0 - 0 | Atlético Nacional |

==== Group B ====
| R | Pos | Team | Pts | GP | W | D | L | GF | GA | Dif |
|---|---|---|---|---|---|---|---|---|---|---|
| (2) | 1. | La Equidad | 12 | 6 | 3 | 3 | 0 | 6 | 3 | +3 |
| (6) | 2. | Deportivo Pasto | 8 | 6 | 2 | 2 | 2 | 5 | 3 | +2 |
| (4) | 3. | Deportes Tolima | 6 | 6 | 1 | 3 | 2 | 6 | 6 | - |
| (8) | 4. | Boyacá Chicó | 4 | 6 | 0 | 4 | 2 | 2 | 7 | -5 |

R=Classification in second phase; Pts=Points; GP=Games played; W=Win; D=Tied; L=Lost; GF=Goals Favored; GA=Goals Allowed; DIF=Difference

Fixture 1 - November 25, 2007
| Home | Score | Away |
|---|---|---|
| Boyacá Chicó | 0 - 3 | Pasto |
| Tolima | 1 - 2 | La Equidad |

Fixture 2- November 28, 2007
| Home | Score | Away |
|---|---|---|
| La Equidad | 1 - 1 | Boyacá Chicó |
| Pasto | 0 - 0 | Tolima |

Fixture 3 - December 2, 2007
| Home | Score | Away |
|---|---|---|
| La Equidad | 1 - 0 | Pasto |
| Tolima | 1 - 1 | Boyacá Chicó |

Fixture 4 - December 5, 2007
| Home | Score | Away |
|---|---|---|
| Pasto | 0 - 1 | La Equidad |
| Boyacá Chicó | 0 - 2 | Tolima |

Fixture 5 - December 9, 2007
| Home | Score | Away |
|---|---|---|
| Boyacá Chicó | 0 - 0 | La Equidad |
| Tolima | 1 - 2 | Pasto |

Fixture 6 - December 12, 2007
| Home | Score | Away |
|---|---|---|
| La Equidad | 1 - 1 | Tolima |
| Pasto | 0 - 0 | Boyacá Chicó |

=== Final ===
| Date | City | Home | Score | Away |
|---|---|---|---|---|
| December 16 | Bogotá | La Equidad | 0 - 3 | Atlético Nacional |
| December 19 | Medellín | Atlético Nacional | 0 - 0 | La Equidad |

== Relegated and Promoted Team(s) ==
| Categories | Relegated team(s) | Promoted team(s) |
|---|---|---|
| FPC; Primera B | Real Cartagena | Envigado FC |
