= 2021 Copa Colombia =

Copa BetPlay Dimayor 2021
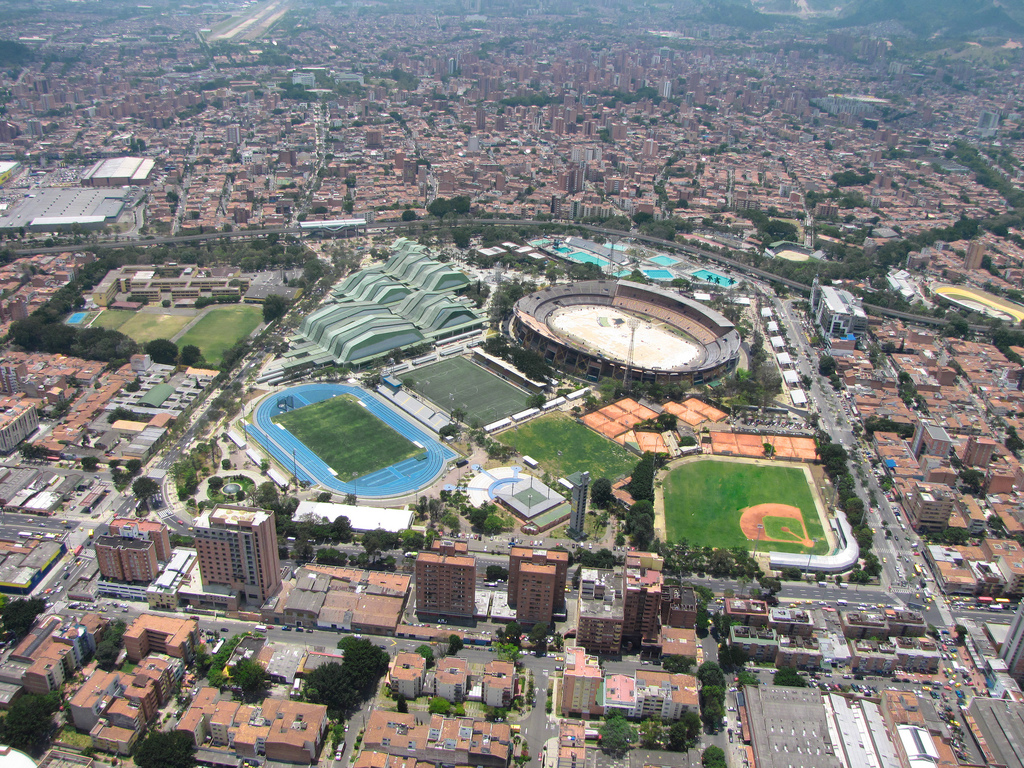

Tournament details
- Country: Colombia
- Dates: 10 March – 24 November 2021
- Teams: 35

Final positions
- Champions: Atlético Nacional (5th title)
- Runners-up: Deportivo Pereira
- Copa Libertadores: Atlético Nacional

Tournament statistics
- Matches played: 68
- Goals scored: 153 (2.25 per match)
- Top goal scorer(s): Jonatan Álvez; Bryan Castrillón; Jefferson Duque (4 goals each)

The 2021 Copa Colombia, officially the Copa BetPlay Dimayor 2021 for sponsorship reasons, was the 19th edition of the Copa Colombia, the national cup competition for clubs of DIMAYOR. The tournament was contested by 35 teams and began on 10 March 2021. It ended on 24 November 2021, with Atlético Nacional winning their fifth title in the competition after defeating Deportivo Pereira in the double-legged final series by a 5–1 aggregate score. As champions, Atlético Nacional qualified for the 2022 Copa Libertadores.

Independiente Medellín were the defending champions, having won the competition in its two most recent editions. They were eliminated by Deportivo Cali in the round of 16.

== Format ==
The format for the 2021 Copa Colombia was the same one used for the 2018 and 2020 editions, with the competition being played in a single-elimination format in its entirety, without any group stages. The 16 Categoría Primera B teams entered the competition in the first stage, being drawn into eight ties. After two stages, four Primera B teams qualified for the third stage, along with ten Categoría Primera A teams that did not enter international competition in the 2021 season, which entered the cup at that stage. Finally, in the round of 16, the seven third stage winners were joined by the four Copa Libertadores qualifiers (América de Cali, Santa Fe, Junior, and Atlético Nacional), the four Copa Sudamericana qualifiers (Deportes Tolima, La Equidad, Deportivo Pasto, and Deportivo Cali), and Águilas Doradas as the best Primera A team that did not qualify for international competition in 2021, which entered the competition at this point. Unlike the previous edition, in which ties from the round of 16 onwards were played as single legs due to the schedule disruptions caused by the COVID-19 pandemic, in this edition all rounds were played on a double-legged basis.

== Schedule ==
The schedule of the competition was as follows:

Round	Draw date	First leg	Second leg
First stage	2 March 2021	10–11 and 18 March 2021	17–18 and 25 March 2021
Second stage	2 March 2021	14–15 April 2021	21–22 April 2021
Third stage	2 March 2021	28–29 July and 4 August 2021	4–5 and 18 August 2021
Round of 16	19 August 2021	25–26 August 2021	1–2 September 2021
Quarter-finals	19 August 2021	8–9 September 2021	15–16 September 2021
Semi-finals	19 August 2021	6 October 2021	20–21 October 2021
Finals	19 August 2021	10 November 2021	24 November 2021

== First stage ==
The first stage was played by the 16 Categoría Primera B clubs, eight of which were seeded in the ties according to their placement in the 2020 season aggregate table. The remaining Primera B clubs were drawn into each tie. The seeded clubs (Team 2) hosted the second leg.

Team 1	Agg.	Team 2	1st leg	2nd leg
Real Cartagena (2)	5–3	Atlético Huila (2)	2–1	3–2
Real Santander (2)	3–2	Cortuluá (2)	1–1	2–1
Barranquilla (2)	2–1	Deportes Quindío (2)	1–1	1–0
Boca Juniors (2)	2–1	Unión Magdalena (2)	1–0	1–1
Orsomarso (2)	0–1	Valledupar (2)	0–0	0–1
Tigres (2)	2–1	Bogotá (2)	0–1	2–0
Fortaleza (2)	1–2	Leones (2)	0–0	1–2
Atlético (2)	0–4	Llaneros (2)	0–0	0–4

=== First leg ===
10 March 2021	Atlético	0–0	Llaneros	Cali
15:00		Report		Stadium: Pascual Guerrero; Attendance: 0 Referee: Jonathan Ortiz

10 March 2021	Orsomarso	0–0	Valledupar	Palmira
16:00		Report		Stadium: Francisco Rivera Escobar; Attendance: 0 Referee: Alexander Ortiz

10 March 2021	Tigres	0–1	Bogotá	Bogotá
18:00		Report	Zárate 55' (pen.)	Stadium: Metropolitano de Techo; Attendance: 0 Referee: Luis Delgado

10 March 2021	Barranquilla	1–1	Deportes Quindío	Barranquilla
20:05	Acuña 12'	Report	Mina 67'	Stadium: Romelio Martínez; Attendance: 0 Referee: Raúl Rojas

11 March 2021	Fortaleza	0–0	Leones	Bogotá
15:00		Report		Stadium: Metropolitano de Techo; Attendance: 0 Referee: Mauricio Mercado

11 March 2021	Real Santander	1–1	Cortuluá	Piedecuesta
15:15	Ramírez 56' (pen.)	Report	Trejos 9'	Stadium: Villa Concha; Attendance: 0 Referee: Juan Mira

11 March 2021	Real Cartagena	2–1	Atlético Huila	Cartagena
17:30	Navarro 61', 64'	Report	Barrios 23' (o.g.)	Stadium: Olímpico Jaime Morón León; Attendance: 0 Referee: Juan Pablo Alba

18 March 2021	Boca Juniors	1–0	Unión Magdalena	Palmira
15:00	Morales 43'	Report		Stadium: Francisco Rivera Escobar; Attendance: 0 Referee: Snaider Pontón

=== Second leg ===
17 March 2021	Valledupar	1–0 (1–0 agg.)	Orsomarso	Valledupar
15:00	Montes 65'	Report		Stadium: Armando Maestre Pavajeau; Attendance: 0 Referee: Mauricio Mercado

17 March 2021	Leones	2–1 (2–1 agg.)	Fortaleza	Itagüí
15:00	Berrío 34'; Córdoba 40'	Report	Navarro 4'	Stadium: Metropolitano Ciudad de Itagüí; Attendance: 0 Referee: Héctor Rivera

17 March 2021	Deportes Quindío	0–1 (1–2 agg.)	Barranquilla	Armenia
17:30		Report	García 57'	Stadium: Centenario; Attendance: 0 Referee: David Espinosa

17 March 2021	Atlético Huila	2–3 (3–5 agg.)	Real Cartagena	Neiva
20:00	Moreno 43' (pen.); Rivera 57'	Report	Meza 53'; Navarro 69' (pen.); Pedrozo 81'	Stadium: Guillermo Plazas Alcid; Attendance: 0 Referee: Diego Ulloa

18 March 2021	Llaneros	4–0 (4–0 agg.)	Atlético	Villavicencio
15:00	Poncet 6', 31'; González 40'; Herrera 88'	Report		Stadium: Bello Horizonte; Attendance: 0 Referee: Steven Camargo

18 March 2021	Cortuluá	1–2 (2–3 agg.)	Real Santander	Tuluá
15:10	Mercado 39' (pen.)	Report	Liñán 26'; Espinal 49'	Stadium: Doce de Octubre; Attendance: 0 Referee: Jonathan Ortiz

18 March 2021	Bogotá	0–2 (1–2 agg.)	Tigres	Bogotá
19:40		Report	Lora 59', 80'	Stadium: Metropolitano de Techo; Attendance: 0 Referee: Diego Ruiz

25 March 2021	Unión Magdalena	1–1 (1–2 agg.)	Boca Juniors	Santa Marta
16:00	Scott 45+1'	Report	Sadovnik 55' (pen.)	Stadium: Sierra Nevada; Attendance: 0 Referee: Alexander Ortiz

== Second stage ==
The second stage was played by the eight first stage winners. In each tie, the clubs with the best performance in the first stage (Team 2) hosted the second leg.

Team 1	Agg.	Team 2	1st leg	2nd leg
Llaneros (2)	1–0	Real Cartagena (2)	0–0	1–0
Leones (2)	1–5	Real Santander (2)	1–3	0–2
Tigres (2)	1–4	Barranquilla (2)	1–1	0–3
Valledupar (2)	3–4	Boca Juniors (2)	2–0	1–4

=== First leg ===
14 April 2021	Llaneros	0–0	Real Cartagena	Villavicencio
15:30		Report		Stadium: Bello Horizonte; Attendance: 0 Referee: Nolberto Ararat

14 April 2021	Valledupar	2–0	Boca Juniors	Valledupar
17:30	Ramírez 82'; Muñoz 85'	Report		Stadium: Armando Maestre Pavajeau; Attendance: 0 Referee: Yahir Cárdenas

14 April 2021	Leones	1–3	Real Santander	Itagüí
19:40	Rivas 34'	Report	Ascanio 18', 23'; Uribe 37' (pen.)	Stadium: Metropolitano Ciudad de Itagüí; Attendance: 0 Referee: Keiner Jiménez

15 April 2021	Tigres	1–1	Barranquilla	Bogotá
17:30	Guzmán 74'	Report	Cantillo 57'	Stadium: Metropolitano de Techo; Attendance: 0 Referee: Héctor Rivera

=== Second leg ===
21 April 2021	Real Santander	2–0 (5–1 agg.)	Leones	Piedecuesta
15:15	Ramírez 17' (pen.); Berrío 66'	Report		Stadium: Villa Concha; Attendance: 0 Referee: Steven Camargo

21 April 2021	Real Cartagena	0–1 (0–1 agg.)	Llaneros	Cartagena
19:40		Report	Vásquez 60'	Stadium: Olímpico Jaime Morón León; Attendance: 0 Referee: Juan Pablo Alba

22 April 2021	Boca Juniors	4–1 (4–3 agg.)	Valledupar	Palmira
15:15	Toloza 12', 24'; Núñez 39'; Pájaro 90+2'	Report	Rivas 36'	Stadium: Francisco Rivera Escobar; Attendance: 0 Referee: Jonathan Aguirre

22 April 2021	Barranquilla	3–0 (4–1 agg.)	Tigres	Barranquilla
19:40	Esparragoza 41'; García 56'; Díaz 90+3'	Report		Stadium: Romelio Martínez; Attendance: 0 Referee: Diego Ruiz

== Third stage ==
The third stage was played by the four second stage winners and 10 Categoría Primera A clubs that did not qualify for international competition, which were seeded in the ties according to their placement in the 2020 season aggregate table. The four second stage winners as well as the best four teams according to the 2020 Primera A aggregate table hosted the second leg.

Team 1	Agg.	Team 2	1st leg	2nd leg
Boyacá Chicó (2)	3–4	Llaneros (2)	1–2	2–2
Patriotas (1)	3–3 (5–4 p)	Real Santander (2)	1–0	2–3
Jaguares (1)	3–2	Barranquilla (2)	3–0	0–2
Deportivo Pereira (1)	2–0	Boca Juniors (2)	1–0	1–0
Alianza Petrolera (1)	2–1	Millonarios (1)	1–0	1–1
Independiente Medellín (1)	4–2	Once Caldas (1)	1–1	3–1
Atlético Bucaramanga (1)	3–2	Envigado (1)	1–1	2–1

=== First leg ===
28 July 2021	Patriotas	1–0	Real Santander	Tunja
15:00	Mendoza 86'	Report		Stadium: La Independencia; Referee: Héctor Rivera

28 July 2021	Atlético Bucaramanga	1–1	Envigado	Bucaramanga
18:00	Acosta 89'	Report	Durán 83'	Stadium: Alfonso López; Referee: Lisandro Castillo

28 July 2021	Independiente Medellín	1–1	Once Caldas	Medellín
20:05	Gallego 3'	Report	Otálvaro 14'	Stadium: Atanasio Girardot; Referee: Luis Matorel

29 July 2021	Jaguares	3–0	Barranquilla	Montería
17:30	Díaz 6'; Lloreda 86'; Tapia 87'	Report		Stadium: Jaraguay; Referee: Mario Herrera

29 July 2021	Boyacá Chicó	1–2	Llaneros	Tunja
19:00	Plazas 60'	Report	Rivas 54'; Mosquera 58'	Stadium: La Independencia; Referee: Diego Escalante

29 July 2021	Deportivo Pereira	1–0	Boca Juniors	Pereira
19:40	M. Cano 83'	Report		Stadium: Hernán Ramírez Villegas; Referee: Juan Pablo Alba

4 August 2021	Alianza Petrolera	1–0	Millonarios	Barrancabermeja
20:05	Molina 48'	Report		Stadium: Daniel Villa Zapata; Referee: Keiner Jiménez

=== Second leg ===
4 August 2021	Real Santander	3–2 (3–3 agg.) (4–5 p)	Patriotas	Piedecuesta
15:00	Quinto 33'; Arboleda 39'; Berrío 74'	Report	Solano 8'; Ordóñez 57'	Stadium: Villa Concha; Referee: Mauricio Mercado

4 August 2021	Once Caldas	1–3 (2–4 agg.)	Independiente Medellín	Manizales
17:40	Cuero 9'	Report	Vuletich 6', 70'; Cambindo 77'	Stadium: Palogrande; Referee: Andrés Rojas

5 August 2021	Llaneros	2–2 (4–3 agg.)	Boyacá Chicó	Villavicencio
15:00	Amaya 12'; Urueña 34'	Report	Cruz 45+1'; Rivas 55'	Stadium: Bello Horizonte; Referee: Lisandro Castillo

5 August 2021	Boca Juniors	0–1 (0–2 agg.)	Deportivo Pereira	Palmira
15:00		Report	Castrillón 77'	Stadium: Francisco Rivera Escobar; Referee: Jorge Duarte

5 August 2021	Envigado	1–2 (2–3 agg.)	Atlético Bucaramanga	Envigado
17:30	Hernández 82'	Report	Quintana 47', 63'	Stadium: Polideportivo Sur; Referee: Yahir Cárdenas

5 August 2021	Barranquilla	2–0 (2–3 agg.)	Jaguares	Barranquilla
20:00	Manga 6' (pen.); Esparragoza 64'	Report		Stadium: Romelio Martínez; Referee: Héctor Rivera

18 August 2021	Millonarios	1–1 (1–2 agg.)	Alianza Petrolera	Bogotá
20:00	Silva 82'	Report	Molina 66'	Stadium: El Campín; Referee: John Hinestroza

== Final stages ==
Each tie in the knockout stage was played in a home-and-away two-legged format. In each tie, the team which has the better overall record up to that stage hosted the second leg, except for the round of 16 where the third stage winners hosted the second leg. The teams entering the competition at this stage were the ones that qualified for the 2021 Copa Libertadores and 2021 Copa Sudamericana, as well as the best team in the Primera A aggregate table that did not qualify for either competition, which were drawn into each of the eight ties. In case of a tie on aggregate score, extra time was not played and the winner was decided in a penalty shoot-out.

=== Bracket ===
Round of 16
América de Cali (p)	0	1	1 (6)
Jaguares	0	1	1 (5)
Deportivo Cali	2	3	5
Independiente Medellín	2	1	3
Santa Fe	1	1	2
Atlético Bucaramanga	0	0	0
Atlético Nacional	3	2	5
Patriotas	0	1	1
La Equidad	1	0	1
Llaneros	0	0	0
Deportes Tolima	1	0	1
Águilas Doradas	0	0	0
Deportivo Pasto	3	3	6
Alianza Petrolera	1	2	3
Junior	4	0	4
Deportivo Pereira	3	2	5

Quarter-finals
América de Cali	2	0	2
Deportivo Cali	2	1	3
Santa Fe	2	0	2 (1)
Atlético Nacional (p)	1	1	2 (3)
La Equidad	0	0	0
Deportes Tolima	0	2	2
Deportivo Pasto	3	1	4 (1)
Deportivo Pereira (p)	2	2	4 (2)

Semi-finals
Deportivo Cali	2	0	2
Atlético Nacional	2	1	3
Deportes Tolima	0	1	1 (4)
Deportivo Pereira (p)	0	1	1 (5)

Finals
Atlético Nacional	5	0	5
Deportivo Pereira	0	1	1

=== Round of 16 ===
The teams qualifying from the third stage played the second leg at home.

Team 1	Agg.	Team 2	1st leg	2nd leg
La Equidad (1)	1–0	Llaneros (2)	1–0	0–0
Atlético Nacional (1)	5–1	Patriotas (1)	3–0	2–1
América de Cali (1)	1–1 (6–5 p)	Jaguares (1)	0–0	1–1
Junior (1)	4–5	Deportivo Pereira (1)	4–3	0–2
Deportivo Pasto (1)	6–3	Alianza Petrolera (1)	3–1	3–2
Deportivo Cali (1)	5–3	Independiente Medellín (1)	2–2	3–1
Santa Fe (1)	2–0	Atlético Bucaramanga (1)	1–0	1–0
Deportes Tolima (1)	1–0	Águilas Doradas (1)	1–0	0–0

==== First leg ====
25 August 2021	La Equidad	1–0	Llaneros	Bogotá
14:00	Salazar 61'	Report		Stadium: Metropolitano de Techo; Referee: Nolberto Ararat

25 August 2021	Junior	4–3	Deportivo Pereira	Barranquilla
18:00	Martínez Borja 16' (pen.), 57'; Hinestroza 74'; Vásquez 90+3'	Report	Castrillón 49'; Arizala 61'; Fuentes 71' (o.g.)	Stadium: Metropolitano Roberto Meléndez; Referee: Diego Ruiz

25 August 2021	Deportes Tolima	1–0	Águilas Doradas	Ibagué
19:00	Miranda 56'	Report		Stadium: Manuel Murillo Toro; Referee: Nicolás Gallo

25 August 2021	Deportivo Pasto	3–1	Alianza Petrolera	Pasto
20:00	Vanegas 24'; Tovar 34'; Rendón 64'	Report	Alzate 90+1'	Stadium: Departamental Libertad; Referee: Wander Mosquera

25 August 2021	Deportivo Cali	2–2	Independiente Medellín	Palmira
20:05	Arroyo 11'; Gutiérrez 88'	Report	Hernández 30'; Arregui 53'	Stadium: Deportivo Cali; Referee: Carlos Ortega

26 August 2021	Santa Fe	1–0	Atlético Bucaramanga	Bogotá
14:00	Herrera 7'	Report		Stadium: El Campín; Referee: Jorge Tabares

26 August 2021	América de Cali	0–0	Jaguares	Cali
18:00		Report		Stadium: Pascual Guerrero; Referee: Alexander Ospina

26 August 2021	Atlético Nacional	3–0	Patriotas	Medellín
20:05	Álvez 14'; Barrera 36'; Banguero 78'	Report		Stadium: Atanasio Girardot; Referee: Éder Vergara

==== Second leg ====
1 September 2021	Llaneros	0–0 (0–1 agg.)	La Equidad	Villavicencio
15:00		Report		Stadium: Bello Horizonte; Referee: Héctor Rivera

1 September 2021	Jaguares	1–1 (1–1 agg.) (5–6 p)	América de Cali	Montería
17:30	Rojas 82'	Report	Gómez 26'	Stadium: Jaraguay; Referee: David Espinosa
	Penalties
	Rojas (penalty scored); Mosquera (penalty scored); Scarpeta (penalty scored); Balanta (penalty scored); Lloreda (penalty missed); Marrufo (penalty scored); Altamiranda (penalty missed)		(penalty scored) Torres; (penalty scored) Andrade; (penalty missed) Gómez; (penalty scored) Quiñones; (penalty scored) Carvajal; (penalty scored) Novoa; (penalty scored) Mosquera

1 September 2021	Deportivo Pereira	2–0 (5–4 agg.)	Junior	Pereira
20:00	Peralta 45+1'; León 80'	Report		Stadium: Hernán Ramírez Villegas; Referee: Wander Mosquera

2 September 2021	Patriotas	1–2 (1–5 agg.)	Atlético Nacional	Tunja
18:00	Murillo 68'	Report	Álvez 24' (pen.), 54'	Stadium: La Independencia; Referee: Keiner Jiménez

2 September 2021	Atlético Bucaramanga	0–1 (0–2 agg.)	Santa Fe	Bucaramanga
18:00		Report	Caballero 85'	Stadium: Alfonso López; Referee: Nicolás Gallo

2 September 2021	Águilas Doradas	0–0 (0–1 agg.)	Deportes Tolima	Rionegro
18:00		Report		Stadium: Alberto Grisales; Referee: Mario Herrera

2 September 2021	Alianza Petrolera	2–3 (3–6 agg.)	Deportivo Pasto	Barrancabermeja
19:00	Alzate 22'; Molina 63'	Report	Ayala 14'; Mena 20', 88'	Stadium: Daniel Villa Zapata; Referee: Nolberto Ararat

2 September 2021	Independiente Medellín	1–3 (3–5 agg.)	Deportivo Cali	Medellín
20:10	López 25'	Report	Á. Rodríguez 72'; G. Rodríguez 79' (pen.), 90+5'	Stadium: Atanasio Girardot; Referee: Luis Matorel

=== Quarter-finals ===
Team 1	Agg.	Team 2	1st leg	2nd leg
La Equidad (1)	0–2	Deportes Tolima (1)	0–0	0–2
Santa Fe (1)	2–2 (1–3 p)	Atlético Nacional (1)	2–1	0–1
América de Cali (1)	2–3	Deportivo Cali (1)	2–2	0–1
Deportivo Pasto (1)	4–4 (1–2 p)	Deportivo Pereira (1)	3–2	1–2

==== First leg ====
8 September 2021	América de Cali	2–2	Deportivo Cali	Cali
18:00	Ramos 43', 89'	Report	Menosse 29'; Gutiérrez 60'	Stadium: Pascual Guerrero; Referee: Bismarks Santiago

8 September 2021	Santa Fe	2–1	Atlético Nacional	Bogotá
20:05	Osorio 40'; Herrera 50'	Report	Gómez 15'	Stadium: El Campín; Referee: Mario Herrera

9 September 2021	La Equidad	0–0	Deportes Tolima	Bogotá
14:00		Report		Stadium: Metropolitano de Techo; Referee: Jorge Tabares

9 September 2021	Deportivo Pasto	3–2	Deportivo Pereira	Pasto
20:30	Flórez 23' (o.g.); Barbaro 61'; Escobar 90+4'	Report	Castrillón 45' (pen.); D. Ramírez 85'	Stadium: Departamental Libertad; Referee: Lisandro Castillo

==== Second leg ====
15 September 2021	Atlético Nacional	1–0 (2–2 agg.) (3–1 p)	Santa Fe	Medellín
17:30	Duque 28'	Report		Stadium: Atanasio Girardot; Referee: Edilson Ariza
	Penalties
	Pabón (penalty scored); Banguero (penalty scored); Perea (penalty scored)		(penalty scored) Moreno; (penalty missed) Castro; (penalty missed) Osorio; (penalty missed) Pedroza

15 September 2021	Deportivo Cali	1–0 (3–2 agg.)	América de Cali	Palmira
20:00	Gutiérrez 6' (pen.)	Report		Stadium: Deportivo Cali; Referee: Luis Matorel

16 September 2021	Deportes Tolima	2–0 (2–0 agg.)	La Equidad	Ibagué
17:30	Albornoz 48'; Ramírez 53'	Report		Stadium: Manuel Murillo Toro; Referee: Bismarks Santiago

16 September 2021	Deportivo Pereira	2–1 (4–4 agg.) (2–1 p)	Deportivo Pasto	Pereira
20:00	León 37'; E. Valencia 67'	Report	Quiñónes 90'	Stadium: Hernán Ramírez Villegas; Referee: Andrés Rojas
	Penalties
	Castrillón (penalty missed); C. Ramírez (penalty scored); Gutiérrez (penalty scored); E. Valencia (penalty missed)		(penalty missed) Duarte; (penalty missed) Rendón; (penalty missed) Ayala; (penalty scored) Quiñónes; (penalty missed) Barbaro

=== Semi-finals ===
Team 1	Agg.	Team 2	1st leg	2nd leg
Deportes Tolima (1)	1–1 (4–5 p)	Deportivo Pereira (1)	0–0	1–1
Deportivo Cali (1)	2–3	Atlético Nacional (1)	2–2	0–1

==== First leg ====
6 October 2021	Deportes Tolima	0–0	Deportivo Pereira	Ibagué
18:00		Report		Stadium: Manuel Murillo Toro; Referee: Luis Matorel

6 October 2021	Deportivo Cali	2–2	Atlético Nacional	Palmira
20:00	Colorado 8'; Velasco 35'	Report	Álvez 73'; Perea 85'	Stadium: Deportivo Cali; Referee: Bismarks Santiago

==== Second leg ====
20 October 2021	Deportivo Pereira	1–1 (1–1 agg.) (5–4 p)	Deportes Tolima	Pereira
17:30	De La Rosa 85'	Report	Plata 14'	Stadium: Hernán Ramírez Villegas; Referee: Jhon Ospina
	Penalties
	Rojas (penalty scored); Gutiérrez (penalty scored); Castrillón (penalty scored); Navarro (penalty scored); C. Ramírez (penalty scored)		(penalty scored) Gómez; (penalty scored) Mosquera; (penalty missed) Balanta; (penalty scored) Albornoz; (penalty scored) Plata

21 October 2021	Atlético Nacional	1–0 (3–2 agg.)	Deportivo Cali	Medellín
20:00	Duque 54'	Report		Stadium: Atanasio Girardot; Referee: Carlos Ortega

=== Finals ===
10 November 2021
20:00

Atlético Nacional	5–0	Deportivo Pereira
Palacio 37'; Barrera 40'; Duque 50', 71'; Castro 90+1'	Report

Estadio Atanasio Girardot, Medellín
Referee: Carlos Betancur

24 November 2021
20:00

Deportivo Pereira	1–0	Atlético Nacional
C. Ramírez 84'	Report

Estadio Hernán Ramírez Villegas, Pereira
Referee: Nicolás Gallo

Atlético Nacional won 5–1 on aggregate.

== See also ==
- 2021 Categoría Primera A season
- 2021 Categoría Primera B season
