= Jhon Jaime Gómez =

Colombian footballer and manager (born 1967)

Personal information
- Full name: Jhon Jaime Gómez
- Date of birth: 5 July 1967 (age 59)
- Place of birth: Medellín, Colombia
- Position: Forward

Team information
- Current team: Boyacá Chicó (manager)

Senior career*
Years	Team	Apps	(Gls)
1989–1990	Cúcuta Deportivo		
1991	Atlético Nacional		
1991–1992	Envigado		
1993–1994	Independiente Medellín		
1995–1996	Atlético Nacional		
1996–1997	Millonarios		
1997	Atlético Nacional		
1998	Envigado		
1999	Deportes Quindío		
2000	Real Cartagena		
2001	Deportivo Pereira		

Managerial career
- 2006–2016: Boyacá Chicó (youth)
- 2017–2020: Boyacá Chicó
- 2021–2026: Boyacá Chicó (assistant)
- 2024: Boyacá Chicó (interim)
- 2026–: Boyacá Chicó
- * Club domestic league appearances and goals

Jhon Jaime Gómez (born 5 July 1967) is a Colombian football manager and former player who played as a forward. He is the current manager of Boyacá Chicó.

Gómez was nicknamed La Flecha (The Arrow) due to his speed.

== Playing career ==
Born in Medellín, Gómez began his career with Cúcuta Deportivo before joining Atlético Nacional ahead of the 1991 season. He finished the year with Envigado in the Categoría Primera B, helping in their promotion as champions.

Gómez signed for Independiente Medellín in 1993, and played with the club in the 1994 Copa Libertadores before returning to Atlético Nacional in 1995. He moved to Millonarios in the following year, and had another spells at Atlético Nacional and Envigado.

Gómez subsequently played for Deportes Quindío, Real Cartagena and Deportivo Pereira, retiring with the latter in 2001, aged 34.

== Managerial career ==
After retiring, Gómez joined Boyacá Chicó in 2006, as a scout and manager of the youth categories. On 25 April 2017, he was appointed manager of the main squad, replacing sacked Nelson Olveira.

Gómez led Chicó to a promotion as champions in his first year, but subsequently suffered immediate relegation. On 1 September 2020, after another top tier promotion in the previous year, he resigned.

Gómez subsequently became an assistant of Mario García still at Chicó, before being confirmed as interim manager on 12 February 2024, in the place of Miguel Caneo. On 7 October, he was appointed as sporting manager of Boyacá Chicó.

On 17 February 2026, Gómez was recalled as interim manager by Boyacá Chicó following the departure of Flabio Torres.

== Honours ==
=== Player ===
Envigado

- Categoría Primera B: 1991

Atlético Nacional

- Copa Interamericana: 1995

=== Manager ===
Boyacá Chicó

- Categoría Primera B: 2017
