= 2011 Copa Colombia =

Copa Postobón 2011

Tournament details
- Country: Colombia
- Teams: 36

Final positions
- Champions: Millonarios (2nd title)
- Runners-up: Boyacá Chicó

Tournament statistics
- Top goal scorer(s): Carlos Bacca; Oscar Iván Méndez (8 goals)

The 2011 Copa Colombia, officially the 2011 Copa Postobón for sponsorship reasons, was the ninth edition of the Copa Colombia, the national football cup competition for clubs of DIMAYOR. It began on February 23 and ended on October 27. The winner earned a berth to the 2012 Copa Sudamericana.

== Format ==
The tournament comprises a total of 36 teams, divided into six groups based on each separate region of Colombia. The group winners and runners-up advance to the Round of 16, along with the four best third-placed teams.

== Phase I ==
=== Group A ===
Comprises teams from the Caribbean and Atlantic regions.

Pos	Team	Pld	W	D	L	GF	GA	GD	Pts	JUN	VAL	UAU	RCA	MAG	BAR
1	Junior (A)	10	6	3	1	17	10	+7	21		1–1	4–2	2–2	3–0	2–1
2	Valledupar (A)	10	6	2	2	14	6	+8	20	1–2		2–1	1–0	2–0	3–0
3	Uniautónoma (A)	10	5	2	3	20	17	+3	17	3–1	0–1		1–1	3–2	4–2
4	Real Cartagena	10	3	2	5	13	14	−1	11	0–1	1–0	1–2		4–2	1–3
5	Unión Magdalena	10	2	2	6	10	20	−10	8	0–0	0–2	2–2	0–2		2–1
6	Barranquilla	10	2	1	7	10	17	−7	7	0–1	0–0	1–2	1–0	1–2	

Updated to match(es) played on June 25, 2011. Source:
Legend: Blue = home team win; Yellow = draw; Red = away team win.
Rules for classification: 1) points; 2) goal difference; 3) number of goals scored.
(A) Advance to the Round of 16

=== Group B ===
Comprises teams from the Paisa region.

Pos	Team	Pld	W	D	L	GF	GA	GD	Pts	ITA	NAC	ONC	DIM	RIO	ENV
1	Itagüí (A)	10	5	2	3	18	13	+5	17		2–3	3–0	1–1	3–2	1–1
2	Atlético Nacional (A)	10	5	2	3	15	15	0	17	1–2		3–0	1–1	3–2	1–0
3	Once Caldas (A)	10	5	1	4	15	16	−1	16	2–1	1–2		2–1	3–0	2–1
4	Independiente Medellín	10	4	3	3	19	15	+4	15	2–1	5–1	1–1		4–3	2–3
5	Deportivo Rionegro	10	4	1	5	20	20	0	13	1–3	2–0	3–1	1–0		4–1
6	Envigado	10	1	3	6	10	18	−8	6	0–1	0–0	1–3	1–2	2–2	

Legend: Blue = home team win; Yellow = draw; Red = away team win.
Rules for classification: 1) points; 2) goal difference; 3) number of goals scored.
(A) Advance to the Round of 16

=== Group C ===
Comprises teams from the Santander region.

Pos	Team	Pld	W	D	L	GF	GA	GD	Pts	PAT	BOY	RSA	CUC	AP	BUC
1	Patriotas (A)	10	5	5	0	13	5	+8	20		1–1	3–0	2–0	1–0	3–2
2	Boyacá Chicó (A)	10	5	3	2	20	14	+6	18	1–1		3–1	1–0	5–0	3–1
3	Real Santander (A)	10	5	2	3	19	19	0	17	1–1	5–2		3–1	3–2	1–1
4	Cúcuta Deportivo	10	2	3	5	11	13	−2	9	0–0	1–2	4–0		3–1	1–1
5	Alianza Petrolera	10	2	3	5	10	17	−7	9	0–0	2–0	1–2	1–1		2–1
6	Atlético Bucaramanga	10	1	4	5	12	17	−5	7	0–1	2–2	1–3	2–0	1–1	

Legend: Blue = home team win; Yellow = draw; Red = away team win.
Rules for classification: 1) points; 2) goal difference; 3) number of goals scored.
(A) Advance to the Round of 16

=== Group D ===
Comprises teams from the capital district of Bogotá.

Pos	Team	Pld	W	D	L	GF	GA	GD	Pts	MIL	SFE	CEN	EQU	ACA	BOG
1	Millonarios (A)	10	5	3	2	19	16	+3	18		2–1	4–2	2–2	3–1	2–1
2	Santa Fe (A)	10	4	3	3	17	12	+5	15	5–1		3–1	1–2	1–0	3–0
3	Centauros	10	4	3	3	17	16	+1	15	2–1	1–1		1–0	5–2	2–1
4	La Equidad	10	3	5	2	14	11	+3	14	1–1	4–1	1–1		1–1	2–1
5	Academia	10	3	3	4	11	16	−5	12	0–2	1–1	2–1	0–0		2–1
6	Bogotá	10	1	3	6	9	16	−7	6	1–1	0–0	1–1	2–1	1–2	

Legend: Blue = home team win; Yellow = draw; Red = away team win.
Rules for classification: 1) points; 2) goal difference; 3) number of goals scored.
(A) Advance to the Round of 16

=== Group E ===
Comprises teams from the Pacific region.

Pos	Team	Pld	W	D	L	GF	GA	GD	Pts	PAS	CAL	AME	COR	PAC	DEP
1	Deportivo Pasto (A)	10	6	2	2	17	8	+9	20		2–1	1–2	2–2	2–0	2–1
2	Deportivo Cali (A)	10	6	2	2	18	10	+8	20	1–0		3–0	3–2	3–1	2–0
3	América	10	4	2	4	11	13	−2	14	0–3	0–0		3–1	1–2	3–0
4	Cortuluá	10	3	3	4	16	15	+1	12	1–3	2–3	3–0		1–1	3–0
5	Pacífico	10	3	3	4	9	11	−2	12	0–0	2–1	0–0	0–1		1–2
6	Depor	10	1	2	7	4	18	−14	5	0–2	1–1	0–2	0–0	0–2	

Legend: Blue = home team win; Yellow = draw; Red = away team win.
Rules for classification: 1) points; 2) goal difference; 3) number of goals scored.
(A) Advance to the Round of 16

=== Group F ===
Comprises teams in the Coffee Zone.

Pos	Team	Pld	W	D	L	GF	GA	GD	Pts	HUI	TOL	EXP	FOR	QUI	PER
1	Huila (A)	10	6	1	3	10	10	0	19		2–1	0–0	1–0	2–1	1–0
2	Deportes Tolima (A)	10	6	0	4	10	6	+4	18	0–1		3–0	1–0	2–0	0–1
3	Expreso Rojo (A)	10	4	4	2	11	9	+2	16	3–1	0–1		2–2	0–0	2–0
4	Fortaleza	10	4	2	4	11	7	+4	14	3–0	0–1	0–1		2–1	3–0
5	Quindío	10	3	3	4	13	11	+2	12	2–1	2–0	1–1	0–1		4–0
6	Deportivo Pereira	10	1	2	7	4	16	−12	5	0–1	0–1	1–2	0–0	2–2	

Legend: Blue = home team win; Yellow = draw; Red = away team win.
Rules for classification: 1) points; 2) goal difference; 3) number of goals scored.
(A) Advance to the Round of 16

== Phase II ==
=== Bracket ===
Round of 16
Itagüí Ditaires	2	1	3 (2)
Real Santander	0	3	3 (4)
Atlético Huila	2	0	2
Atlético Nacional	3	1	4
Patriotas	0	2	2 (4)
Expreso Rojo	1	1	2 (3)
Boyacá Chicó	2	1	3
Santa Fe	1	0	1
Junior	1	1	2 (4)
Once Caldas	1	1	2 (3)
Deportivo Pasto	0	0	0
Valledupar	1	1	2
Millonarios	3	1	4
Uniautonoma	2	1	3
Deportivo Cali	0	1	1
Deportes Tolima	3	0	3

Quarterfinals
Real Santander	1	2	3
Atlético Nacional	1	4	5
Patriotas	1	1	2 (1)
Boyacá Chicó	1	1	2 (3)
Junior	0	1	1 (4)
Valledupar	0	1	1 (2)
Millonarios	2	2	4
Deportes Tolima	3	0	3

Semifinals
Atlético Nacional	1	1	2 (6)
Boyacá Chicó	1	1	2 (7)
Junior	1	0	1
Millonarios	4	0	4

Final
Boyacá Chicó	0	0	0
Millonarios	1	1	2

=== Round of 16 ===
The round of 16 will be a 2-legged playoff in which the team winning in aggregate score will advance to the quarterfinals. In such a case of a series being tied in the aggregate score, a penalty shoot-out will be used, and neither the away goals rule nor extra time will be applied. Team 1 plays the second leg at home. The first legs were played between July 13 and July 16, and return legs were played on July 20 and July 21.

Team 1	Agg.	Team 2	1st leg	2nd leg
Itagüí Ditaires	3–3 (2–4 p)	Real Santander	2–0	1–3
Atlético Huila	2–4	Atlético Nacional	2–3	0–1
Patriotas F.C.	2–2 (4–3 p)	Expreso Rojo	0–1	2–1
Boyacá Chicó	3–1	Santa Fe	2–1	1–0
Junior	2–2 (4–3 p)	Once Caldas	1–1	1–1
Deportivo Pasto	0–2	Valledupar	0–1	0–1
Millonarios	4–3	Uniautonoma	3–2	1–1
Deportivo Cali	1–3	Deportes Tolima	0–3	1–0

=== Quarterfinals ===
The quarterfinals will again be a 2-legged elimination series in which the winners of the Round of 16 were paired up and drawn into fixtures. The teams that win in aggregate score will advance to the semifinals. In case of a tie at the end of the second leg, the away goals rule will not come into effect and the series will go directly to a penalty shoot-out. The first legs will be played on August 31 and the return legs will be played on September 7.

Team 1	Agg.	Team 2	1st leg	2nd leg
Real Santander	3–5	Atlético Nacional	1–1	2–4
Patriotas	2–2 (1–3 p)	Boyacá Chicó	1–1	1–1
Junior	1–1 (4–2 p)	Valledupar	0–0	1–1
Millonarios	4–3	Deportes Tolima	2–3	2–0

=== Semifinals ===
The semifinals will again be a 2-legged elimination series in which the winners of the Quarterfinals were paired up and drawn into fixtures. The team that wins in aggregate score will advance to the final. In case of a tie at the end of the second leg, the away goals rule will not come into effect and the series will go directly to a penalty shoot-out. The first legs will be played on October 5 and the return legs will be played on October 12.

Team 1	Agg.	Team 2	1st leg	2nd leg
Atlético Nacional	2–2 (6–7 p)	Boyacá Chicó	1–1	1–1
Junior	1–4	Millonarios	1–4	0–0

=== Final ===
The final will be a 2-legged series. In case of a tie at the end of the second leg, the away goals rule will not come into effect and the series will go directly to a penalty shoot-out. The first leg will be played on October 19 and the return leg will be played on October 27.

Team 1	Agg.	Team 2	1st leg	2nd leg
Boyacá Chicó	0–2	Millonarios	0–1	0–1

== Top goalscorers ==
Rank	Name	Club	Goals
1	(Colombia) Carlos Bacca	Junior	8
1	(Colombia) Oscar Iván Méndez	Real Cartagena	8
3	(Colombia) Wilberto Cosme	La Equidad	7
3	(Colombia) Dani Geliz	Valledupar	7
5	(Colombia) Juan Alejandro González	Real Cartagena	6
5	(Colombia) Edwin Móvil	Boyacá Chicó	6
5	(Colombia) Jhon Pajoy	Once Caldas	6
5	(Colombia) Leandro Vargas	Uniautonoma	6
