= Marlon Sierra =

Colombian footballer (born 1994)

Personal information
- Full name: Marlon Ricardo Sierra Zamora
- Date of birth: 21 September 1994 (age 32)
- Place of birth: Meta, Colombia
- Height: 1.75 m (5 ft 9 in)
- Position: Midfielder

Team information
- Current team: Llaneros
- Number: 6

Youth career
- Llaneros

Senior career*
Years	Team	Apps	(Gls)
2014–2017	Llaneros	85	(1)
2017–2019	Celaya	6	(0)
2019–2020	Llaneros	4	(0)
2020–2021	Jaguares	22	(0)
2021–2022	Llaneros	29	(0)
2024–	Llaneros	76	(0)
- * Club domestic league appearances and goals as of 12 December 2025

Marlon Ricardo Sierra Zamora (born 21 September 1994) is a Colombian footballer who plays as a midfielder for Llaneros.

== Career statistics ==
As of 16 April 2019.

Club	Season	League			Cup		Other		Total	
Club	Season	Division	Apps	Goals	Apps	Goals	Apps	Goals	Apps	Goals
Llaneros	2014	Categoría Primera B	31	1	8 (Note: Appearances in the Copa Colombia)	0	0	0	39	1
Llaneros	2015	Categoría Primera B	17	0	4	0	0	0	21	0
Llaneros	2016	Categoría Primera B	21	0	6	1	0	0	27	1
Llaneros	2017	Categoría Primera B	16	0	1	0	0	0	17	0
Llaneros	Total		85	1	19	1	0	0	104	2
Celaya	2017–18	Ascenso MX	0	0	0	0	0	0	0	0
Celaya	2018–19	Ascenso MX	6	0	0	0	0	0	6	0
Celaya	Total		6	0	0	0	0	0	6	0
Career total			91	1	19	1	0	0	110	2
