= Yhonny Ramírez =

Colombian footballer (born 1983)

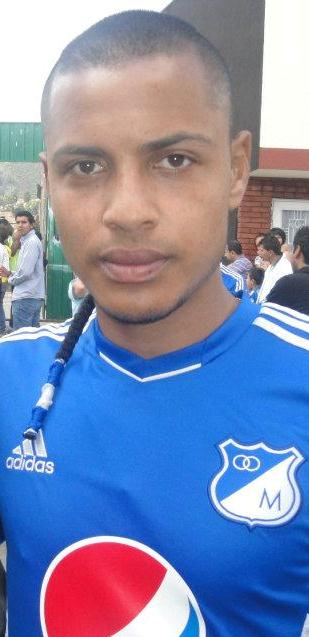
- Ramírez with Millonarios

Personal information
- Full name: Yhonny Albeiro Ramírez Lozano
- Date of birth: May 23, 1983 (age 43)
- Place of birth: Medellín, Colombia
- Height: 1.70 m (5 ft 7 in)
- Position: Defensive midfielder

Team information
- Current team: Leones
- Number: 5

Senior career*
Years	Team	Apps	(Gls)
2004–2007	Envigado		
2007	Real Cartagena		
2008–2011	Boyacá Chicó	94	(6)
2012–2014	Millonarios	64	(1)
2014	→ Atlético Junior (loan)	22	(0)
2015–2016	Atlético Junior	21	(1)
2017	Cúcuta Deportivo	16	(0)
2018	Cortuluá	22	(3)
2019–	Leones	2	(0)
- * Club domestic league appearances and goals as of 1 December 2017 ‡ National team caps and goals as of November 16, 2012

Yhonny Albeiro Ramírez Lozano (Medellín, May 23, 1983) is a Colombian professional footballer who plays in Categoría Primera B for Leones FC as a defensive midfielder.
