= Carlos Rivas (footballer, born 1991) =

Colombian footballer

Personal information
- Full name: Carlos Andrés Rivas Gómez
- Date of birth: 22 August 1991 (age 35)
- Place of birth: Antioquia, Colombia
- Height: 1.66 m (5 ft 5 in)
- Position: Winger

Team information
- Current team: Al-Salmiya
- Number: 7

Youth career
- Envigado

Senior career*
Years	Team	Apps	(Gls)
2012–2014	Valledupar	77	(21)
2013	→ Independiente Medellín (loan)	2	(0)
2014–2015	Patriotas	55	(11)
2016	Santa Fe	11	(1)
2016	→ América de Cali (loan)	4	(2)
2017	Jaguares de Córdoba	3	(0)
2017–2018	Correcaminos UAT	12	(0)
2019	Llaneros	19	(6)
2019–2020	Patriotas Boyacá	24	(1)
2020–2021	Llaneros	7	(0)
2021–2022	Al-Yarmouk	16	(10)
2022	Valledupar	17	(9)
2022-	Al-Salmiya	14	(7)
- * Club domestic league appearances and goals as of 14:20, 13 June 2022 (UTC)

Carlos Andrés Rivas Gómez (born 22 August 1991) is a Colombian footballer who plays as a winger for Al-Salmiya.
