= Érik Bodencer =

Argentine footballer

Personal information
- Full name: Érik Maximiliano Bodencer
- Date of birth: 8 March 2000 (age 26)
- Place of birth: Lomas de Zamora, Buenos Aires, Argentina
- Position: Forward

Team information
- Current team: Llaneros
- Number: 24

Youth career
- Boca Juniors

Senior career*
Years	Team	Apps	(Gls)
2021–2025	Boca Juniors	2	(0)
2022–2023	→ Sacachispas (loan)	33	(1)
2023	→ San Telmo (loan)	25	(9)
2024–2025	→ CA Atlanta (loan)	27	(0)
2025–	Llaneros	14	(0)
- * Club domestic league appearances and goals as of 12 December 2025

Érik Maximiliano Bodencer (born 8 March 2000) is an Argentine,footballer currently playing as a forward for Llaneros in Colombia.

== Career statistics ==
=== Club ===
As of 18 August 2021.

Club	Season	League			Cup		Continental		Other		Total	
Club	Season	Division	Apps	Goals	Apps	Goals	Apps	Goals	Apps	Goals	Apps	Goals
Boca Juniors	2021	Argentine Primera División	2	2	0	0	0	0	0	0	2	0
Career total			2	0	0	0	0	0	0	0	2	0
