= 2017 Categoría Primera B season =

Torneo Águila
- Season: 2017
- Dates: 12 February – 6 December 2017
- Champions: Boyacá Chicó (2nd title)
- Promoted: Boyacá Chicó; Leones
- Matches: 286
- Goals: 685 (2.4 per match)
- Top goalscorer: Apertura: Erwin Carrillo and Gustavo Torres (9 goals each); Finalización: Jeison Medina and Jhon Velásquez (10 goals each); Season: Erwin Carrillo and Jeison Medina (18 goals each)
- Biggest home win: Valledupar 5–0 Bogotá (16 April); Cúcuta Deportivo 5–0 Llaneros (16 July); Deportes Quindío 6–1 Valledupar (29 October); Llaneros 5–0 Deportes Quindío (5 November)
- Biggest away win: Atlético 0–4 Deportivo Pereira (11 July)
- Highest scoring: Valledupar 2–5 Real Cartagena (22 March); Boyacá Chicó 5–2 Cúcuta Deportivo (1 June); Deportes Quindío 6–1 Valledupar (29 October)

The 2017 Categoría Primera B season (officially known as the 2017 Torneo Águila season for sponsorship reasons) was the 28th season since its founding as Colombia's second division football league.

== Format ==
For this season, the league switched from the 'one tournament per year' format used in the two most recent seasons to a 'two tournaments per year' one. The season will consist of two tournaments: the 'Torneo Apertura' and the 'Torneo Finalización'. Both were divided into three stages. The First Stage was contested on a home-and-away basis, with each team playing the other teams once and playing a regional rival once more. The top eight teams after the sixteen rounds advanced to a knockout round, where they were pitted into four ties to be played on a home-and-away basis, with the four winners advancing to the semifinals and the winner of each semifinal advancing to the final of the tournament, which was played on a home-and-away basis as well.

The winners of both finals qualified for the season final which was played after the conclusion of the Torneo Finalización and also consisted of two legs, with its winner being promoted to the Categoría Primera A for the 2018 season. The season runner-up would have to play the best team in the aggregate table (other than the champion) on a home-and-away basis for the second promotion berth. In case a team won both the Apertura and Finalización tournaments, it would be promoted and the second promoted team would have been the winner of the double-legged series between the next two best teams in the aggregate table, however, if the season runner-up ended up as the best team in the aggregate table, it would also be promoted and the promotion play-off would not be played.

== Teams ==
16 teams took part, fourteen of them returning from last season plus Boyacá Chicó and Fortaleza, who were relegated from the 2016 Primera A. The former played in the second tier after 13 years while the latter returned after one season in the top flight. Both teams replaced América de Cali and Tigres who earned promotion at the end of the last season.

Locations of the 2017 Categoría Primera B teams

Club	Home city	Stadium	2016 season
Atlético	Cali	Pascual Guerrero	16th
Barranquilla	Barranquilla	Metropolitano Roberto Meléndez	12th
Bogotá	Bogotá	Metropolitano de Techo	8th
Boyacá Chicó	Tunja	La Independencia	20th (Primera A)
Cúcuta Deportivo	Cúcuta	General Santander^{a}	10th
Deportes Quindío	Armenia	Centenario	6th
Deportivo Pereira	Pereira	Hernán Ramírez Villegas	1st
Fortaleza	Bogotá	Municipal Héctor El Zipa González	19th (Primera A)
Leones	Itagüí	Metropolitano Ciudad de Itagüí	5th
Llaneros	Villavicencio	Manuel Calle Lombana	15th
Orsomarso	Palmira	Francisco Rivera Escobar	11th
Real Cartagena	Cartagena	Jaime Morón León	3rd
Real Santander	Floridablanca	Álvaro Gómez Hurtado	14th
Unión Magdalena	Santa Marta	Diego de Carvajal^{b}	13th
Universitario	Popayán	Ciro López	7th
Valledupar	Valledupar	Armando Maestre Pavajeau	9th

a: Cúcuta Deportivo used the Estadio Municipal Héctor El Zipa González in Zipaquirá as home stadium between February and August.
b: Unión Magdalena used the Estadio Diego de Carvajal in Magangué instead of the Estadio Municipal de Ciénaga as home stadium for the 2017 season.

== Torneo Apertura ==
=== First stage ===
==== Standings ====
Pos	Team	Pld	W	D	L	GF	GA	GD	Pts	Qualification
1	Deportivo Pereira	16	10	5	1	23	10	+13	35	Advance to the knockout phase
2	Deportes Quindío	16	9	2	5	23	11	+12	29	Advance to the knockout phase
3	Real Santander	16	8	4	4	18	10	+8	28	Advance to the knockout phase
4	Llaneros	16	8	3	5	19	15	+4	27	Advance to the knockout phase
5	Boyacá Chicó	16	7	6	3	20	18	+2	27	Advance to the knockout phase
6	Leones	16	8	2	6	23	16	+7	26	Advance to the knockout phase
7	Cúcuta Deportivo	16	7	5	4	21	14	+7	26	Advance to the knockout phase
8	Orsomarso	16	7	5	4	17	14	+3	26	Advance to the knockout phase
9	Barranquilla	16	7	2	7	20	20	0	23	
10	Fortaleza	16	5	6	5	15	16	−1	21	
11	Universitario de Popayán	16	4	5	7	15	17	−2	17	
12	Valledupar	16	5	1	10	18	24	−6	16	
13	Unión Magdalena	16	4	2	10	19	31	−12	14	
14	Bogotá	16	4	2	10	15	27	−12	14	
15	Real Cartagena	16	3	4	9	16	25	−9	13	
16	Atlético	16	2	6	8	13	27	−14	12	

Source: Dimayor, Soccerway
Rules for classification: 1) Points, 2) Goal difference, 3) Goals for, 4) Away goals for, 5) Away goals against, 6) Drawing of lots

==== Results ====
Home \ Away	ATL	BAR	BOG	BOY	CUC	QUI	PER	FOR	LEO	LLA	ORS	RCA	RSA	MAG	UPO	VAL
Atlético	—	—	2–1	1–2	—	—	—	—	1–1	1–1	0–3	—	0–2	1–1	1–1	—
Barranquilla	3–1	—	3–2	1–2	—	—	—	—	3–2	—	—	—	0–1	1–1	2–0	0–1
Bogotá	—	—	—	1–2	1–0	—	1–0	—	1–2	0–1	0–2	—	—	3–1	2–0	—
Boyacá Chicó	—	—	1–1	—	0–1	0–2	1–1	1–1	—	2–0	—	2–0	—	—	—	1–0
Cúcuta Deportivo	1–1	0–1	—	—	—	1–0	—	1–0	—	—	2–2	5–1	1–1	—	—	3–1
Deportes Quindío	3–0	2–0	2–0	—	—	—	1–2	1–1	—	—	—	—	1–0	4–0	2–1	—
Deportivo Pereira	4–1	2–1	—	—	2–0	1–0	—	1–1	—	—	1–1	1–0	—	—	—	2–1
Fortaleza	2–1	2–1	2–2	—	0–1	—	—	—	1–0	—	—	—	0–0	3–2	1–0	—
Leones	—	—	—	4–0	2–0	3–2	0–1	—	—	1–2	—	1–1	1–0	—	—	0–1
Llaneros	—	3–1	—	—	0–0	1–1	1–2	2–0	—	—	—	1–0	—	—	3–1	3–2
Orsomarso	1–0	0–1	—	1–1	—	1–0	—	1–0	1–4	1–0	—	—	—	1–2	—	—
Real Cartagena	1–2	0–0	2–0	—	—	0–1	—	1–1	—	—	0–0	—	1–3	0–2	2–1	—
Real Santander	—	—	2–0	1–1	—	—	0–0	—	0–1	2–0	3–1	—	—	2–1	0–2	—
Unión Magdalena	—	—	—	1–2	1–4	—	1–3	—	0–1	1–0	—	3–2	—	—	—	2–3
Universitario de Popayán	—	—	—	2–2	1–1	—	0–0	—	2–0	0–1	0–0	—	—	1–0	—	3–0
Valledupar	0–0	1–2	5–0	—	—	0–1	—	1–0	—	—	0–1	2–5	0–1	—	—	—

Source: Dimayor, Soccerway
Legend: Blue = home team win; Yellow = draw; Red = away team win.

=== Knockout phase bracket ===
Quarterfinals
2	Deportes Quindío	2	2	4
8	Orsomarso	1	2	3
3	Real Santander (p)	1	1	2 (4)
6	Leones	2	0	2 (3)
1	Deportivo Pereira	0	1	1
7	Cúcuta Deportivo	1	2	3
4	Llaneros	1	1	2
5	Boyacá Chicó	3	0	3

Semifinals
2	Deportes Quindío	0	2	2 (3)
3	Real Santander (p)	1	1	2 (4)
7	Cúcuta Deportivo	2	4	6
5	Boyacá Chicó	5	2	7

Finals
3	Real Santander	2	1	3
5	Boyacá Chicó	3	1	4

=== Quarterfinals ===
Team 1	Agg.	Team 2	1st leg	2nd leg
Cúcuta Deportivo	3–1	Deportivo Pereira	1–0	2–1
Orsomarso	3–4	Deportes Quindío	1–2	2–2
Leones	2–2 (3–4 p)	Real Santander	2–1	0–1
Boyacá Chicó	3–2	Llaneros	3–1	0–1

=== Semifinals ===
Team 1	Agg.	Team 2	1st leg	2nd leg
Boyacá Chicó	7–6	Cúcuta Deportivo	5–2	2–4
Real Santander	2–2 (4–3 p)	Deportes Quindío	1–0	1–2

=== Finals ===
8 June 2017
17:45 UTC−5

Boyacá Chicó	3–2	Real Santander
Riascos 38' (pen.); Ponce 65'; González 83'	Report	Mosquera 7' (o.g.); Camacho 76'

Estadio La Independencia, Tunja
Referee: Nicolás Gallo

12 June 2017
19:00 UTC−5

Real Santander	1–1	Boyacá Chicó
Ríos 90+2' (pen.)	Report	Valdés 22'

Estadio Álvaro Gómez Hurtado, Floridablanca
Referee: Carlos Betancur

Torneo Águila
2017 Apertura Winners

=== Top goalscorers ===
Rank	Name	Club	Goals
1	(Colombia) Erwin Carrillo	Cúcuta Deportivo	9
1	(Colombia) Gustavo Torres	Deportes Quindío	9
3	(Colombia) Juan Sebastián Herrera	Barranquilla	8
3	(Colombia) Junior Murillo	Orsomarso	8
3	(Colombia) Luis Ferney Ríos	Real Santander	8
3	(Colombia) Diego Valdés	Boyacá Chicó	8
7	(Colombia) Roger Lemus	Real Santander	7
7	(Colombia) Jeison Medina	Leones	7
7	(Colombia) Misael Riascos	Boyacá Chicó	7
7	(Colombia) Jader Valencia	Bogotá	7

Source: Resultados.com

== Torneo Finalización ==
=== First stage ===
==== Standings ====
Pos	Team	Pld	W	D	L	GF	GA	GD	Pts	Qualification
1	Barranquilla	16	10	3	3	21	10	+11	33	Advance to the knockout phase
2	Deportivo Pereira	16	9	3	4	23	13	+10	30	Advance to the knockout phase
3	Deportes Quindío	16	9	3	4	28	19	+9	30	Advance to the knockout phase
4	Leones	16	9	3	4	20	15	+5	30	Advance to the knockout phase
5	Cúcuta Deportivo	16	8	3	5	30	20	+10	27	Advance to the knockout phase
6	Llaneros	16	6	7	3	26	23	+3	25	Advance to the knockout phase
7	Real Cartagena	16	7	3	6	20	20	0	24	Advance to the knockout phase
8	Orsomarso	16	6	5	5	16	14	+2	23	Advance to the knockout phase
9	Boyacá Chicó	16	6	5	5	16	15	+1	23	
10	Unión Magdalena	16	5	5	6	20	22	−2	20	
11	Atlético	16	5	3	8	13	25	−12	18	
12	Real Santander	16	3	5	8	21	25	−4	14	
13	Bogotá	16	3	5	8	10	19	−9	14	
14	Valledupar	16	3	5	8	14	28	−14	14	
15	Fortaleza	16	2	6	8	14	19	−5	12	
16	Universitario de Popayán	16	2	6	8	13	18	−5	12	

Source: Dimayor, Soccerway
Rules for classification: 1) Points, 2) Goal difference, 3) Goals for, 4) Away goals for, 5) Away goals against, 6) Drawing of lots

==== Results ====
Home \ Away	ATL	BAR	BOG	BOY	CUC	QUI	PER	FOR	LEO	LLA	ORS	RCA	RSA	MAG	UPO	VAL
Atlético	—	0–0	—	—	1–3	1–2	0–4	1–0	—	—	0–2	2–1	—	—	—	2–0
Barranquilla	—	—	—	—	1–0	3–0	2–0	1–0	—	1–2	2–0	1–2	—	—	—	0–1
Bogotá	1–2	0–1	—	0–0	—	0–2	—	1–0	—	—	—	0–0	1–2	—	—	2–0
Boyacá Chicó	0–1	1–1	0–2	—	—	—	—	—	1–0	—	0–0	—	3–2	3–0	1–0	—
Cúcuta Deportivo	—	—	3–1	3–0	—	—	0–2	2–2	3–2	5–0	—	—	—	3–2	0–0	—
Deportes Quindío	—	—	—	1–3	2–0	—	2–0	—	1–2	1–1	2–1	1–1	—	—	—	6–1
Deportivo Pereira	—	—	3–0	1–0	—	2–0	—	—	2–0	2–2	—	—	1–0	2–1	1–0	—
Fortaleza	—	—	—	2–2	1–0	1–2	1–1	—	—	3–3	0–0	0–1	—	—	—	3–0
Leones	2–0	2–3	0–0	—	—	—	—	1–0	—	—	1–0	—	1–0	2–1	1–0	—
Llaneros	4–0	—	2–0	1–0	—	—	—	—	0–0	—	1–2	—	3–3	2–2	1–0	—
Orsomarso	1–1	—	2–0	—	0–0	—	1–0	—	—	—	—	3–1	0–2	—	2–1	1–2
Real Cartagena	—	—	—	0–1	2–3	—	3–1	—	2–3	1–0	—	—	—	0–0	—	2–1
Real Santander	3–1	0–1	—	—	2–4	2–3	—	1–1	1–1	—	—	1–2	—	—	—	0–0
Unión Magdalena	2–1	1–1	1–1	—	—	0–2	—	1–0	—	—	1–1	0–1	2–1	—	3–1	—
Universitario de Popayán	0–0	0–1	1–1	—	—	1–1	—	2–0	—	2–3	—	3–1	1–1	—	—	—
Valledupar	—	1–2	—	1–1	2–1	—	1–1	—	1–2	1–1	—	—	—	1–3	1–1	—

Source: Dimayor, Soccerway
Legend: Blue = home team win; Yellow = draw; Red = away team win.

=== Knockout phase bracket ===
Quarterfinals
4	Leones (p)	0	1	1 (4)
8	Orsomarso	1	0	1 (2)
1	Barranquilla	0	2	2
5	Cúcuta Deportivo	3	1	4
3	Deportes Quindío	0	1	1
6	Llaneros	5	3	8
2	Deportivo Pereira	0	1	1
7	Real Cartagena	3	1	4

Semifinals
4	Leones	2	2	4
5	Cúcuta Deportivo	2	1	3
6	Llaneros	1	2	3
7	Real Cartagena	2	0	2

Finals
4	Leones	4	0	4
6	Llaneros	1	0	1

=== Quarterfinals ===
Team 1	Agg.	Team 2	1st leg	2nd leg
Cúcuta Deportivo	4–2	Barranquilla	3–0	1–2
Real Cartagena	4–1	Deportivo Pereira	3–0	1–1
Llaneros	8–1	Deportes Quindío	5–0	3–1
Orsomarso	1–1 (2–4 p)	Leones	1–0	0–1

=== Semifinals ===
Team 1	Agg.	Team 2	1st leg	2nd leg
Cúcuta Deportivo	3–4	Leones	2–2	1–2
Real Cartagena	2–3	Llaneros	2–1	0–2

=== Finals ===
23 November 2017
15:15 UTC–5

Llaneros	1–4	Leones
Velásquez 90+3' (pen.)	Report	Medina 7', 39'; Restrepo 58'; Gómez 75' (pen.)

Estadio Manuel Calle Lombana, Villavicencio
Referee: John Hinestroza

26 November 2017
19:10 UTC–5

Leones	0–0	Llaneros
	Report

Estadio Metropolitano Ciudad de Itagüí, Itagüí
Referee: Nicolás Gallo

Torneo Águila
2017 Finalización Winners

=== Top goalscorers ===
Rank	Name	Club	Goals
1	(Colombia) Jeison Medina	Leones	10
1	(Colombia) Jhon Velásquez	Llaneros	10
3	(Colombia) Erwin Carrillo	Cúcuta Deportivo	9
4	(Colombia) Mario Álvarez	Llaneros	7
4	(Colombia) Diego Echeverri	Cúcuta Deportivo	7
4	(Colombia) José Hugo Palacios	Llaneros	7
4	(Colombia) Luis Ferney Ríos	Real Santander	7
4	(Colombia) Juan José Salcedo	Real Cartagena	7
9	(Colombia) Ethan González	Barranquilla	6
9	(Colombia) Juan Camilo Zapata	Valledupar	6

Source: Resultados.com

== Final ==
2 December 2017
17:15 UTC–5

Boyacá Chicó	0–0	Leones
	Report

Estadio La Independencia, Tunja
Referee: Carlos Betancur

6 December 2017
17:00 UTC–5

Leones	1–1	Boyacá Chicó
Medina 45'	Report	Vázquez 55'
Penalties
Restrepo (penalty scored); Muñoz (penalty scored); Jaramillo (penalty scored); Serna (penalty missed)	3–5	(penalty scored) Ponce; (penalty scored) Barreto; (penalty scored) Vázquez; (penalty scored) Escobar; (penalty scored) Mosquera

Estadio Metropolitano Ciudad de Itagüí, Itagüí
Referee: Andrés Rojas

Torneo Águila
2017 champions

2nd title

== Aggregate table ==
Pos	Team	Pld	W	D	L	GF	GA	GD	Pts	Qualification
1	Leones	42	21	9	12	55	39	+16	72	Promotion to Categoría Primera A
2	Cúcuta Deportivo	40	19	9	12	67	48	+19	66	
3	Deportivo Pereira	36	19	9	8	48	30	+18	66	
4	Deportes Quindío	38	20	6	12	58	43	+15	66	
5	Llaneros	40	18	11	11	59	48	+11	65	
6	Boyacá Chicó (C)	40	16	14	10	51	45	+6	62	Promotion to Categoría Primera A
7	Barranquilla	34	18	5	11	43	34	+9	59	
8	Orsomarso	36	14	11	11	37	33	+4	53	
9	Real Santander	38	13	10	15	46	43	+3	49	
10	Real Cartagena	36	12	8	16	42	49	−7	44	
11	Unión Magdalena	32	9	7	16	39	53	−14	34	
12	Fortaleza	32	7	12	13	29	35	−6	33	
13	Valledupar	32	8	6	18	32	52	−20	30	
14	Atlético	32	7	9	16	26	52	−26	30	
15	Universitario de Popayán	32	6	11	15	28	35	−7	29	
16	Bogotá	32	7	7	18	25	46	−21	28	

Source: Dimayor
Rules for classification: 1) Points, 2) Goal difference, 3) Goals for, 4) Away goals for, 5) Away goals against, 6) Drawing of lots
(C) Champions

== Promotion play-off ==
Since the season runners-up Leones also ended up as the best team in the aggregate table, they earned automatic promotion to the Categoría Primera A and the promotion play-off was not played.

== See also ==
- 2017 Categoría Primera A season
- 2017 Copa Colombia
