= Serafín García =

Uruguayan footballer (born 1975)

Personal information
- Full name: Serafin Fabricio García Fleitas
- Date of birth: 17 June 1975 (age 51)
- Height: 1.68 m (5 ft 6 in)
- Positions: Right-back; right winger

Senior career*
| Years | Team | Apps | (Gls) |
| 1996 | Basáñez | | |
| 1996–2002 | Peñarol | | |
| 1999–2000 | → Chacarita Juniors (loan) | 31 | (3) |
| 2002–2003 | Lanús | 28 | (1) |
| 2003 | Gimnasia y Esgrima de La Plata | 13 | (0) |
| 2004 | Cerro Porteño | 26 | (0) |
| 2005 | Montevideo Wanderers | 31 | (4) |
| 2006–2007 | Peñarol | | |
| 2008 | Villa Española | 13 | (0) |
| 2009 | Durazno | 11 | (1) |
| 2009–2010 | El Tanque Sisley | 22 | (4) |
| 2010–2016 | Boston River | 114 | (25) |
- * Club domestic league appearances and goals

Serafin Fabricio García Fleitas (born 15 July 1975) is an Uruguayan former professional footballer who played as a right-back and as a right winger.

== Career ==
García started his professional career with Basáñez in the Uruguayan Segunda División in 1996. His performances there resulted in a move to Peñarol. In his first year at the club he helped the team achieve its second quinquenio, a streak of five consecutive Uruguayan Primera División titles, by winning the 1997 Campeonato Uruguayo Primera División.

García played for Argentine club Chacarita Juniors on loan. After Chacarita Juniors did not exercise their option to sign him permanently and did not extend the loan, he returned to Peñarol where he was left out of the squad list submitted for the Mercosur Cup.

In June 2002, García trained with Argentine side Lanús. This angered Peñarol, whom he was contracted to until the end of the year, and whom he had neither notified nor received permission from. Peñarol's board of directors imposed a fine on García for his absence from training.

García moved to Gimnasia y Esgrima de La Plata, also in Argentina, in summer 2003, together with compatriot Nelson Olveira.

During his time at Cerro Porteño in Paraguay he helped the club win the Apertura of the 2004 Paraguayan Primera División season.

He returned to Peñarol in 2006, "to become one of the team's key figures".

García joined Boston River in 2010, In April 2015, at age 39, he was the oldest player in the Uruguayan Segunda División, along with teammate Leonel Pilipauskas. He remained at Boston River until 2016 when he retired.

== Post-playing career ==
After his retirement from playing, García worked as an Uber driver. From 2019, he was a coach in the youth academy of his former club Peñarol, leading a youth development project for defenders in the youngest age groups. He also served as assistant coach for the Peñarol under-19 team.

== Honours ==
Peñarol

- Uruguayan Primera División: 1997

Cerro Porteño

- Paraguayan Primera División Apertura: 2004
