= Jeison Medina =

Colombian footballer (born 1995)

Personal information
- Full name: Jeison Medina Escobar
- Date of birth: 27 February 1995 (age 31)
- Place of birth: Itagüí, Colombia
- Height: 1.80 m (5 ft 11 in)
- Position: Forward

Team information
- Current team: L.D.U. Quito
- Number: 16

Youth career
- 2005–2007: La Gloria
- 2007: Santa Mónica
- 2008–2012: Atlético Nacional

Senior career*
Years	Team	Apps	(Gls)
2013	Comfenalco		
2014	La Mazzia		
2015–2016	Ditaires FC	?	(65)
2017–2018	Leones	60	(20)
2018	→ Zaragoza (loan)	2	(0)
2019	América de Cali	25	(5)
2020–2022	Deportivo Pasto	52	(12)
2021–2022	→ Al-Shamal (loan)	17	(8)
2023	Lamia	8	(1)
2023–2024	Aucas	30	(19)
2024–2025	IDV	29	(12)
2025	L.D.U. Quito	20	(3)
- * Club domestic league appearances and goals as of 23:23, 13 May 2023 (UTC)

Jeison Medina Escobar (born 27 February 1995) is a Colombian professional footballer who plays as a forward.

== Career ==
Born in Itagüí, Medina represented Atlético Nacional as a youth but was released at the age of 15. He later represented amateur sides Comfenalco, Club La Mazzia and Ditaires FC, scoring more than 60 goals for the latter side.

In January 2016, Medina agreed to a move to Serie D side Catiadas, but the move was cancelled due to paperwork problems. On 1 February 2017, he signed a one-year deal with Leones in Categoría Primera B after being approved on a trial held at his hometown.

Medina made his debut for Leones on 11 February 2017, starting in a 0–1 home loss against Valledupar. He scored his first goals on 11 March, netting a brace in a 3–2 home defeat of Deportes Quindío, and finished the season with 18 goals as his side achieved promotion.

Medina made his professional debut on 3 February 2018, starting and scoring the equalizer in a 1–2 Categoría Primera A home loss against América de Cali; it was also Leones' first goal in the first division. On 12 June, he moved abroad, signing a one-year loan deal with Segunda División side Real Zaragoza, with a buyout clause.

On 28 January 2019, América de Cali announced that they had signed Medina. In the 2020 season, he moved to Deportivo Pasto.
