= Bryan Castrillón =

Colombian footballer (born 1999)

Personal information
- Full name: Bryan David Castrillón Gómez
- Date of birth: 30 March 1999 (age 27)
- Place of birth: Medellín, Colombia
- Height: 1.73 m (5 ft 8 in)
- Position: Winger

Team information
- Current team: Junior
- Number: 88

Youth career
- Envigado
- Medellín

Senior career*
Years	Team	Apps	(Gls)
2018–2024	Medellín	50	(0)
2020	→ Bucaramanga (loan)	11	(0)
2021	→ Pereira (loan)	41	(9)
2022–2023	→ Unión Santa Fe (loan)	35	(4)
2024	→ Junior (loan)	17	(0)
2024–	Junior	26	(5)
- * Club domestic league appearances and goals as of 15 May 2025

Bryan David Castrillón Gómez (born 30 March 1999) is a Colombian footballer who plays as a winger for Categoría Primera A club Atlético Junior.

== Club career ==
=== Early years ===
Castrillón grew up in the El Limonar 2 neighborhood of San Antonio de Prado in Medellín. At the age of seven, he joined Envigado.

=== Independiente Medellín ===
Castrillón played his way up through Independiente Medellín's youth sector and made his debut for the first team in the Categoría Primera A on 23 September 2019 against Independiente Santa Fe. Castrillón quickly became a regular starter and became the main revelation of the team. After playing 15 games in his debut season, he signing a new deal with Independiente until the end of 2022 in December 2018. In his second season, he made a total of 25 appearances for Independiente.

==== Loan spells ====
To add more minutes and return to the club more mature, Castrillón went on loan for a year without purchase option to Atlético Bucaramanga in January 2020. In his three first games, Castrillón was noted for three assist. However, the club decided not to trigger the buying option.

On 4 January 2021 it was confirmed, that Castrillón would play for Deportivo Pereira on loan for the 2021 season. He made his debut on 21 January 2021 against Alianza Petrolera, where he also scored for Pereira. After a very good season, it was confirmed in October 2021, that he would return to Independiente Medellín at the end of the year.

==== Return to Independiente and loan spells ====
After returning to Independiente Medellín in January 2022 from a very good loan spell at Deportivo Pereira, it was reported that Castillón had received a bid from a foreign club. However, Independiente wanted to keep him.

After 22 appearances for Independiente during 2022, the club confirmed on 21 June 2022, that Castillón had been loaned out to Argentine Primera División side Unión de Santa Fe until the end 2023 with a purchase option. Ahead of the 2024 season, he moved on to another loan spell, this time at Atlético Junior.

=== Atlético Junior ===
After a loan spell at the club, it was confirmed on July 18, 2024, that Castillón had joined Atlético Junior on a permanent deal, signing for three years.

== International career ==
In March 2019, Castillón was called up for the Colombia national under-20 football team pre-squad ahead of the 2019 FIFA U-20 World Cup. However, he was not summoned for the final squad.
