= Néstor Salazar =

Colombian footballer (born 1973)

Personal information
- Full name: Néstor Fabián Salazar Díaz
- Date of birth: 19 December 1973 (age 52)
- Place of birth: Palmira, Valle del Cauca, Colombia
- Position: Forward

Senior career*
Years	Team	Apps	(Gls)
1994	Expreso Palmira	?	(?)
1995	Atlético Bucaramanga	?	(?)
1995–1996	Deportivo Cali	?	(?)
1997–1998	Cortuluá	?	(?)
1999	Valledupar FC	48	(15)
2000	América de Cali	44	(19)
2001	Atlético Nacional	37	(12)
2002–2003	Gimnasia y Esgrima La Plata	8	(1)
2003	Centauros Villavicencio	35	(10)
2004	Atlético Nacional	20	(4)
2004–2005	América de Cali	39	(8)
2005	Deportivo Pereira	23	(9)
2006	Deportivo Quito	16	(3)
2006	Deportes Quindío	14	(4)
2007–2008	Boyacá Chico	78	(16)
2009	Deportivo Pasto	8	(0)
2009–2010	Real Cartagena	40	(11)
2010	Corporación Deportiva Santa Fe	18	(2)
2011	Itagüí Ditaires	10	(1)

International career
1999–2001	Colombia	4	(2)
- * Club domestic league appearances and goals

Néstor Salazar (born 19 December 1973) is a Colombian former football forward.

== Titles ==
Season	Club	Title
1995-96	Deportivo Cali	Categoría Primera A
2008	Boyacá Chico	Categoría Primera A - Torneo Apertura
