= José Luis Mosquera =

Colombian footballer (born 1995)

Personal information
- Full name: José Luis Mosquera Moreno
- Date of birth: 14 March 1995 (age 31)
- Place of birth: Turbo, Colombia
- Position: Defender

Senior career*
| Years | Team | Apps | (Gls) |
| 2017–2019 | Boyacá Chicó | 59 | (4) |
| 2020–2021 | Leones | 10 | (0) |
| 2021–2022 | Hegelmann Litauen | 8 | (0) |
| 2022–2023 | AFC Uttara | 0 | (0) |
- * Club domestic league appearances and goals as of 27 March 2023

José Luis Mosquera Moreno (born 14 March 1995) is a Colombian professional footballer who last played as a defender for Bangladesh Premier League club AFC Uttara.
