= Edwin Móvil =

Colombian footballer (born 1986)

Personal information
- Full name: Edwin Dayan Móvil Cabrera
- Date of birth: 5 July 1986 (age 40)
- Place of birth: Barranquilla, Colombia
- Height: 1.74 m (5 ft 9 in)
- Position: Midfielder

Senior career*
Years	Team	Apps	(Gls)
2002–2006	Once Caldas	12	(0)
2006–2009	Boyacá Chicó	113	(15)
2009–2010	Belgrano	14	(1)
2010–2014	Boyacá Chicó	142	(28)
2015	Cúcuta Deportivo	21	(2)
2016–2020	Deportivo Pereira	101	(5)
Total		403	(51)
- * Club domestic league appearances and goals as of 18 October 2020

Edwin Dayan Móvil Cabrera (born 7 May 1986), known as Edwin Móvil, is a retired Colombian footballer who played for last time in Categoría Primera A club Deportivo Pereira.

Móvil played as a central midfielder. He played with the Colombian U-20 national team at the 2005 South American Youth Championship, which Colombia hosted and won. He then competed at the 2005 FIFA World Youth Championship in the Netherlands, helping Colombia to the Round of 16 before losing to eventual champion Argentina. He was a member of the 2005 Colombian Sub 20 that won the Sudamericana.

== Honours ==
Once Caldas

- Categoría Primera A (1): 2003-II
- Copa Libertadores (1): 2004

Boyacá Chicó

- Categoría Primera A (1): 2008-I

=== Individual ===
- All-time top scorer in Boyacá Chico (42 goals).
