= 1991 Categoría Primera B season =

Categoría Primera B
- Season: 1991
- Champions: Envigado (1st title)
- Promoted: Envigado
- Top goalscorer: Mayid Arias (8 goals)

The 1991 Categoría Primera B season, (officially known as the 1991 Copa Concasa for sponsorship reasons) was the first season of Colombia's second division football league. The first match of the competition was played on 20 April 1991 in Bogotá, a 1–1 draw between El Cóndor and Alianza Llanos.

Envigado won the tournament and became the first team to be promoted to the Categoría Primera A. Mayid Arias, playing for Alianza Llanos, was the topscorer with 8 goals.

== Teams ==
Team	City	Stadium
Academia Bogotana	Bogotá	El Campincito
Alianza Llanos	Villavicencio	Manuel Calle Lombana
Atlético Buenaventura	Buenaventura	Marino Klinger
Atlético Huila	Neiva	Guillermo Plazas Alcid
Cortuluá	Tuluá	Doce de Octubre
Deportes Dinastía	Riosucio	El Vergel
Deportivo Armenia	Armenia	San José
Deportivo Rionegro	Rionegro	Alberto Grisales
El Cóndor	Bogotá	El Campincito
Envigado	Envigado	Polideportivo Sur

== Aggregate table ==
Pos	Team	Pld	W	D	L	GF	GA	GD	Pts	Qualification or relegation
1	El Cóndor	18	8	9	1	23	9	+14	25	Advance to Cuadrangular Final
2	Atlético Huila	18	9	5	4	13	6	+7	23	Advance to Cuadrangular Final
3	Alianza Llanos	18	8	6	4	19	10	+9	22	Advance to Cuadrangular Final
4	Envigado	18	7	7	4	16	14	+2	21	Advance to Cuadrangular Final
5	Deportes Dinastía	18	7	6	5	11	10	+1	20	
6	Deportivo Rionegro	18	5	7	6	12	16	−4	17	
7	Atlético Buenaventura	18	4	8	6	14	14	0	16	
8	Academia Bogotana	18	4	4	10	12	18	−6	12	
9	Deportivo Armenia	18	3	6	9	12	23	−11	12	
10	Cortuluá	18	3	6	9	9	20	−11	12	

Source: El Tiempo

== Cuadrangular Final ==
Pos	Team	Pld	W	D	L	GF	GA	GD	Pts	Qualification or relegation
1	Envigado (C, P)	6	4	1	1	5	2	+3	9.5	Promotion to Categoría Primera A
2	Alianza Llanos	6	2	2	2	4	3	+1	6.5	
3	Atlético Huila	6	2	1	3	2	3	−1	5.5	
4	El Cóndor	6	1	2	3	3	6	−3	4.5	

Source: Historia del Fútbol Profesional Colombiano 70 Años
(C) Champions; (P) Promoted

Categoría Primera B
1991 champion
Envigado
1st title

== Top scorers ==
Rank	Player	Club	Goals
1	(Colombia) Mayid Arias	Alianza Llanos	8
2	(Colombia) Manuel Arquímedes	El Cóndor	7
2	(Colombia) Jorge Iván Hoyos	Envigado	7

Source: Historia del Fútbol Profesional Colombiano 70 Años
