= Llaneros F.C. =

Colombian football club

- Full name: Llaneros Fútbol Club S.A.
- Nicknames: El equipo de la Media Colombia (The Media Colombia team); Los Nuevos Centauros (The New Centauros); Los Indomables (The Indomitables); Los Metenses (The Meta ones); El Blanco Y Negro (The Black and White); Los Villavicenses (The Villavicencio ones); Las Arpas de Oro (The Golden Harps); Vendaval Llanero (Plains Gale); Los Caballos (The Horses); Los de la Orinoquía (The Orinoquía ones); Los Baquianos
- Founded: 20 April 2012; 14 years ago
- Ground: Bello Horizonte – Rey Pelé
- Capacity: 15,000
- President: Juan Carlos Trujillo
- Head coach: Wilmer Sandoval (caretaker)
- League: Categoría Primera A
- 2025: Primera A, 16th of 20
- Website: www.llanerosfutbolclub.com
Home colours	Away colours	Third colours

Llaneros Fútbol Club S.A. is a professional Colombian football team based in Villavicencio, that currently plays in the Categoría Primera A. They play their home games at the Bello Horizonte stadium.

== History ==
=== First years ===
Llaneros F.C. was founded on 20 April 2012, after the then Governor of Meta Department Alan Jara and Mayor of Villavicencio Juan Guillermo Zuluaga with the backing of oil company Pacific Rubiales Energy bought the participation rights (ficha) of Categoría Primera B club Academia, based in Bogotá. The General Assembly of Academia approved the sale of the club on 22 March 2012, with DIMAYOR giving its approval on 27 March 2012 and announcing that Llaneros would enter the competition for the second half of the 2012 season. The club played its first game on 22 July 2012, losing to Alianza Petrolera by a 1–0 score at Academia's former home stadium Estadio Compensar in Bogotá.

By 2015, the club went through an economic crisis accentuated by the problems of its main sponsor Pacific Rubiales, which led the owners to consider offers to sell and move the club to another area of the country. However, at the start of 2016 Llaneros signed an alliance with Categoría Primera A club Santa Fe, in which Santa Fe sent several of its young players to Llaneros on loan as well as a coaching staff led by Germán González, while being responsible for the payment of their wages.

Llaneros' best performance in Primera B until then came in the 2017 season, in which the team managed by Jairo Patiño reached the finals of the Torneo Finalización but were beaten by Leones by a 4–1 aggregate score, missing the chance to play an additional final series for promotion to the top flight.

=== 2021 controversy ===
On 4 December 2021, the last matchday of the semi-final Group B of the second tournament of the 2021 Primera B season, Llaneros were beaten by Unión Magdalena by a 2–1 score with a couple of goals in quick succession in stoppage time. This result helped Unión Magdalena earn promotion to Categoría Primera A at the expense of Fortaleza, who were clinching promotion despite losing their final match to Bogotá at the same time since Llaneros were leading against Unión Magdalena. However, video footage of Unión Magdalena's winning goal appeared to show the Llaneros players backing off and failing to make an effort to prevent their rivals from scoring. The events sparked outrage both within the country and abroad, with Colombian internationals Juan Cuadrado and Mateus Uribe expressing their displeasure, calling them "a lack of respect" and "an embarrassment for Colombian football", whilst President of Colombia Iván Duque Márquez stated it was a "national disgrace".

In response to the growing backlash, as well as calls from Fortaleza to get the match annulled and Unión Magdalena's promotion reversed, DIMAYOR chairman Fernando Jaramillo ordered the opening of an inquiry on the match events while also requesting the Office of the Attorney General of Colombia to investigate whether any criminal offenses had been committed, but on 7 December 2021, Jaramillo stated that the tournament would not be paused and Unión Magdalena's promotion would not be overturned while due process was completed.

On 30 December 2021 DIMAYOR's Disciplinary Commission closed the investigation on Unión Magdalena as it found no evidence implying that members of the aforementioned club had been responsible for the events that occurred in the match, but sources within the governing body of Colombian professional football stated that the investigation on Llaneros would remain open. Five months later, it was announced that four Llaneros players who were involved in that match had been fined and suspended from all sporting and administrative activities for "committing acts against sporting dignity and decorum".

=== Consolidation and promotion ===
In spite of the incident in the 2021 Primera B semi-finals, Llaneros kept consistent performances in subsequent seasons. In 2022, Llaneros advanced to the semi-final stage of both of the tournaments played in the season but failed to reach the finals of either tournament, placing third in their Torneo I group and second in their Torneo II one, with Boyacá Chicó advancing to the finals both times. In the following season Llaneros reached a tournament final for the second time, losing the Torneo I final to Patriotas, but failed to advance to the Torneo II finals and subsequently missed out on promotion after placing second in the season's aggregate table.

In 2024, Llaneros advanced to the Torneo I semi-finals after placing third in the first stage and subsequently won Group B after edging past Unión Magdalena on goal difference. There they faced Orsomarso, winning on penalty kicks after a 2–2 draw on aggregate. Although manager Martín Cardetti was replaced halfway into Llaneros's Torneo II campaign by Venezuelan manager Pedro Depablos, the team's campaign in the last tournament of the season remained consistent, advancing to the semi-finals in second place, which granted it a tiebreaking advantage for the following round of the competition. Eventually, Llaneros made use of that advantage to reach the finals of the tournament, defeating Deportes Quindío on the final matchday to win their group ahead of Real Cartagena with whom they ended tied at 12 points. Having won the 2024–I tournament, Llaneros had the chance to clinch the Primera B championship as well as automatic promotion if they also won the Torneo II, but they ended up losing the finals to Unión Magdalena by a 5–1 aggregate score. In the season's grand final, which once again had Llaneros facing Unión Magdalena, both teams won their respective home matches 1–0, forcing a penalty shootout to decide the 2024 Primera B champion which was eventually won by Unión Magdalena who promoted to Categoría Primera A as Primera B champions. However, since Llaneros ended the season as the best team in the aggregate table of the season, they were able to avoid playing a play-off series for the final promotion spot and promoted to the top flight for the first time ever.

== Players ==
=== Current squad ===
As of 24 September 2026

Note: Flags indicate national team as defined under FIFA eligibility rules; some limited exceptions apply. Players may hold more than one non-FIFA nationality.

No.	Pos.	Nation	Player
2	DF	COL	Howell Mena
4	DF	COL	Juan David Pertúz
5	MF	COL	Eyder Restrepo
6	MF	COL	Marlon Sierra
7	FW	COL	Luis Miranda
8	MF	COL	Juan José Ramírez (on loan from Millonarios)
9	FW	COL	Carlos Cortés
10	MF	COL	Néider Ospina
11	FW	COL	Luis Marimón (on loan from Millonarios)
12	GK	COL	Juan Camilo Loaiza
13	MF	COL	Juan Castilla
14	FW	COL	Kevin Rincón
16	DF	COL	Jhojan Escobar
17	FW	COL	Yorleys Mena
19	MF	COL	Daniel Mantilla (on loan from Deportivo Cali)

No.	Pos.	Nation	Player
20	MF	COL	Brandon Chury
21	DF	COL	Francisco Meza (captain)
22	GK	COL	Roameth Romaña
23	DF	COL	Alejandro Moralez
26	DF	ECU	Dennys Quintero
29	DF	COL	Léider Riascos (on loan from Deportes Tolima)
30	MF	COL	Julián Beltrán
31	DF	COL	Emilio Pardo
32	MF	COL	Frank Castañeda
33	MF	COL	Kelvin Osorio
35	MF	COL	Kevin Caicedo
70	FW	COL	Joel Contreras (on loan from Unión Magdalena)
94	DF	COL	Jimmy Medranda
95	MF	COL	Jhon Vásquez
99	DF	COL	Daniel Quiñones

=== Out on loan ===
Note: Flags indicate national team as defined under FIFA eligibility rules; some limited exceptions apply. Players may hold more than one non-FIFA nationality.

No.	Pos.	Nation	Player
—	GK	COL	Kevin Armesto (at Eldense)

== Honours ==
- Categoría Primera B
  - Runners-up (1): 2024

== Managers ==
- (Lebanon) Alberto Rujana (July 2012 – October 2013)
- (Colombia) Hubert Bodhert (December 2013 – March 2015)
- (Colombia) Nelson Gómez (March 2015 – June 2015)
- (Colombia) Víctor González Scott (August 2015 – September 2015)
- (Colombia) Rubén Molina (September 2015 – December 2015)
- (Colombia) Germán González (January 2016 – December 2016)
- (Colombia) Jairo Patiño (January 2017 – March 2018)
- (Colombia) Nelson Gómez (March 2018 – December 2019)
- (Colombia) David Suárez (January 2020 – July 2020)
- (Colombia) Wilmer Sandoval (July 2020 – January 2021)
- (Colombia) Walter Aristizábal (January 2021 – April 2022)
- (Colombia) Jersson González (April 2022 – November 2023)
- (Argentina) Martín Cardetti (November 2023 – September 2024)
- (Venezuela) Pedro Depablos (September 2024 – December 2024)
- (Colombia) Jaime de la Pava (January 2025 – March 2025)
- (Colombia) José Luis García (March 2025 – October 2026)

Source: Worldfootball.net
