= Mario García (footballer, born 1980) =

Mexican footballer

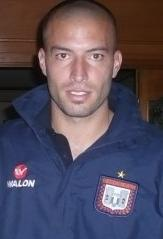
- García with Boyacá Chicó in 2009

Personal information
- Full name: Mario Humberto García Caboara
- Date of birth: 14 September 1980 (age 46)
- Place of birth: Guadalajara, Mexico
- Height: 1.86 m (6 ft 1 in)
- Position: Defender

Team information
- Current team: Nicaragua (Assistant)

Senior career*
Years	Team	Apps	(Gls)
2003	Tecos UAG	2	(0)
2003–2005	Central Córdoba	19	(0)
2005–2006	AS Varese	1	(0)
2006–2012	Boyacá Chicó	167	(11)
2013	Pumas Morelos	5	(0)
2013	Boyacá Chicó	4	(0)
2014–2015	Deportes Quindío	40	(2)

Managerial career
- 2016–2020: Boyacá Chicó (assistant)
- 2021–2023: Boyacá Chicó
- 2024–: Nicaragua (Assistant)
- * Club domestic league appearances and goals

Mario Humberto García Caboara (born 14 September 1980) is a Mexican football manager and former player who played as a defender.

García is of Italian descent. He was the first Mexican footballer to win a national championship in Colombia.
