= Miguel Caneo =

Argentine footballer (born 1983)

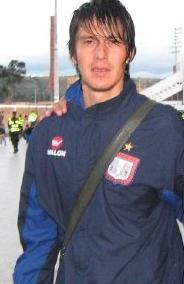

Personal information
- Full name: Miguel Eduardo Caneo
- Date of birth: 17 August 1983 (age 43)
- Place of birth: General Roca, Argentina
- Height: 1.75 m (5 ft 9 in)
- Position: Attacking midfielder

Youth career
- Boca Juniors

Senior career*
Years	Team	Apps	(Gls)
2003–2004	Boca Juniors	16	(1)
2005–2006	Quilmes	64	(15)
2006	Colo-Colo	8	(3)
2007–2008	Godoy Cruz	2	(0)
2008–2010	→ Chicó (loan)	32	(17)
2010–2014	Quilmes	99	(24)
2014	Deportivo Cali	14	(0)
2015–2016	Arsenal de Sarandí	18	(2)
2016	Chicó	11	(1)
2017–2018	Quilmes	17	(5)
2018–2019	Atlanta	19	(2)
2019–2020	Boca Unidos	10	(0)

Managerial career
- 2024: Boyacá Chicó
- * Club domestic league appearances and goals

Miguel Eduardo Caneo (born 17 August 1983) is an Argentine football manager and former player who played as a midfielder.

== Career ==
Caneo was born in General Roca, Rio Negro Province. As a young boy he was part of the Boca Juniors youth system, to make his professional debut in the first team in 2003. He made a total of 33 appearances for the club in all competitions, scoring 2 goals. He was then transferred to Argentine club Quilmes in 2005 before joining Colo-Colo in 2006. In the January 2007 transfer window, Caneo returned to his native Argentina to play for Godoy Cruz de Mendoza.

== Personal life ==
Caneo is of Mapuche descent.

== Honours ==
Boca Juniors

- Argentine Primera División: 2003 Apertura
- Copa Libertadores: 2003

Colo Colo

- Chilean Primera División: 2006 Clausura

Boyacá Chicó

- Categoría Primera A: 2008 Apertura
