= Deivi Barrios =

Colombian footballer (born 2004)

Personal information
- Full name: Deivi Fernando Barrios Villadiego
- Date of birth: 30 March 2004 (age 22)
- Place of birth: Cartagena, Bolívar, Colombia
- Height: 1.83 m (6 ft 0 in)
- Position: Defender

Team information
- Current team: Real Cartagena
- Number: 2

Youth career
- Toto Barrios
- 2017–2019: Atlético Colombia

Senior career*
Years	Team	Apps	(Gls)
2020–	Real Cartagena	43	(3)

International career^{‡}
2019	Colombia U15	6	(0)
2020	Colombia U16	2	(0)
2021–	Colombia U20	3	(0)
- * Club domestic league appearances and goals as of 16:53, 14 September 2023 (UTC) ‡ National team caps and goals as of 21:36, 14 September 2023 (UTC)

Deivi Fernando Barrios Villadiego (born 30 March 2004) is a Colombian footballer who currently plays as a defender for Real Cartagena.

== Early life ==
Born in Cartagena, Colombia in the Bolívar Department of Colombia, Barrios grew up in the La María neighborhood with his mother and brother, while his father lived locally, but with another family.

== Club career ==
Barrios began his footballing career at the Escuela de Fútbol Toto Barrios, where he stayed until the age of thirteen, when he joined Atlético Colombia. His performances at Atlético Colombia earned him a call up to the Colombia under-15 side for the 2019 South American U-15 Championship, and after he was named in the 'team of the tournament', he was signed by professional side Real Cartagena - the club he had supported growing up.

Having made his debut in Real Cartagena's 1–1 Copa Colombia draw with Atlético Cali, he established himself as a semi-regular starter in the team by the following season, and was reportedly attracting interest from clubs in Europe. He also occasionally served as captain during the 2021 season, despite being only sixteen.

In May 2022, while training with the Colombian squad for the 2022 Maurice Revello Tournament, Barrios suffered a serious injury to his knee and underwent meniscal remodelling surgery, missing the entirety of the second half of the 2022 season.

== International career ==
Barrios has represented Colombia at under-15, under-16 and under-20 level.

== Career statistics ==
=== Club ===
As of 14 September 2023.

Appearances and goals by club, season and competition
Club	Season	League			Cup		Other		Total	
Club	Season	Division	Apps	Goals	Apps	Goals	Apps	Goals	Apps	Goals
Real Cartagena	2020	Categoría Primera B	5	0	1 (Note: Appearances in the Copa Colombia)	0	0	0	6	0
Real Cartagena	2021	Categoría Primera B	18	2	4	0	0	0	22	2
Real Cartagena	2022	Categoría Primera B	13	0	1	0	0	0	14	0
Real Cartagena	2023	Categoría Primera B	7	1	0	0	0	0	7	1
Career total			43	3	6	0	0	0	49	3
