= Jader Valencia =

Colombian footballer (born 1999)

Personal information
- Full name: Jader Andrés Valencia Mena
- Date of birth: 15 November 1999 (age 26)
- Place of birth: Sincelejo, Sucre, Colombia
- Height: 1.92 m (6 ft 4 in)
- Position: Forward

Team information
- Current team: Deportes Tolima
- Number: 11

Senior career*
Years	Team	Apps	(Gls)
2014–2017	Bogotá	59	(14)
2017–2025	Millonarios	141	(20)
2019–2021	→ Lens B (loan)	15	(1)
2019–2021	→ Lens (loan)	0	(0)
2025–2026	Independiente Medellín	15	(0)
2026–	Deportes Tolima	2	(0)

International career^{‡}
2019	Colombia U20	8	(0)
- * Club domestic league appearances and goals as of 15 March 2026 ‡ National team caps and goals as of 10 February 2019

Jader Andrés Valencia Mena (born 15 November 1999) is a Colombian professional footballer who plays as forward for Categoría Primera A club Deportes Tolima.

== Career ==
Valencia started his career with Bogotá.
