= Delio Ramírez =

Colombian footballer (born 2000)

Personal information
- Full name: Delio Ángel Ramírez Raigosa
- Date of birth: 25 November 2000 (age 25)
- Place of birth: San José, Colombia
- Height: 1.61 m (5 ft 3 in)
- Position: Midfielder

Team information
- Current team: Boyacá Chicó
- Number: 11

Youth career
- Deportivo Pereira

Senior career*
Years	Team	Apps	(Gls)
2019–2023	Deportivo Pereira	38	(4)
2022	→ Bogotá (loan)	34	(1)
2025–	Boyacá Chicó	39	(0)
- * Club domestic league appearances and goals as of 12 December 2025 ‡ National team caps and goals as of 16 September 2020

Delio Ramírez (born 25 November 2000) is a Colombian professional football player who plays as a midfielder for Boyacá Chicó.
