= Jhon Velásquez =

Bolivian footballer

Personal information
- Full name: Jhon Cristian Velásquez Velasco
- Date of birth: 22 April 2003 (age 23)
- Place of birth: Cliza, Bolivia
- Height: 1.63 m (5 ft 4 in)
- Position: Winger

Team information
- Current team: Bolívar
- Number: 21

Youth career
- Argentinos Juniors BOL

Senior career*
Years	Team	Apps	(Gls)
2021	Argentinos Juniors BOL		
2022–	Bolívar	53	(14)
2022	→ Thisted (loan)	0	(0)
2023	→ Jorge Wilstermann (loan)	26	(1)

International career^{‡}
2024–	Bolivia U23	3	(0)
2025-	Bolivia	1	(0)
- * Club domestic league appearances and goals as of 30 December 2025 ‡ National team caps and goals as of 6 June 2025

Jhon Cristian Velásquez Velasco (born 22 April 2003) is a Bolivian professional footballer who plays as a winger for Bolívar and the Bolivia national team.

== Club career ==
Born in Cliza, Bolivia, Velásquez joined Bolívar in 2022 from Argentinos Juniors from Santa Cruz de la Sierra. In the second half of the same year, he was loaned out to Danish club Thisted FC alongside his fellows Leonardo Velasco and Juan Magallanes.

Back to Bolivia, Velásquez was loaned out to Jorge Wilstermann for the 2023 season. In 2024, he returned to Bolívar.

== International career ==
In 2024, Velásquez represented the Bolivia under-23 team in the Pre-Olympic Tournament.

In September 2024, Velásquez received his first call-up to the Bolivia senior team under Óscar Villegas for the 2026 FIFA World Cup qualifiers against Colombia and Argentina. He made his senior Bolivia debut on 6 June 2025 as a second-half substitute against Venezuela in CONMEBOL World Cup qualifying.

== Career statistics ==
=== International ===
As of match played 6 June 2025

Appearances and goals by national team and year
National team	Year	Apps	Goals
Bolivia	2025	1	0
Total		1	0

== Honours ==
Bolívar

- Primera División: 2022 Apertura, 2024
