= 2008 Categoría Primera A season =

Copa Mustang
- Season: 2008
- Dates: 1 February - 21 December
- Champions: Apertura: Boyacá Chico (1st title); Finalización: America de Cali (13th title)
- Relegated: Atletico Bucaramanga
- Copa Libertadores: America de Cali; Independiente Medellín; Boyaca Chico
- Copa Sudamericana: La Equidad; Deportivo Cali
- Top goalscorer: Apertura: Ivan Velazquez; Finalización: Fredy Montero
- Biggest home win: Boyaca Chico 7-2 Tolima (5 April); Medellin 5-0 Bucaramanga (13 April); Medellin 5-0 Cali (24 May)
- Biggest away win: Deportivo Cali 0-4 America (22 March); Millonarios 0-4 Boyaca Chico (13 April)
- Highest scoring: Boyaca Chico 7-2 Tolima (5 April)

The 2008 Categoría Primera A season was the 61st season of Colombia's top-flight football league. The season started on 1 February and ended with the finals on 21 December.

Boyacá Chicó won their first ever title in the Apertura tournament, beating America de Cali 4–2 on penalties. América de Cali won their thirteenth title in the Finalizacion tournament, beating Independiente Medellín 4–1 on aggregate.

== Teams ==
18 teams competed this season. Real Cartagena was relegated in the previous season, and were replaced by the 2007 Categoría Primera B champions, Envigado.

=== Stadia & Locations ===
Team	Stadium	Capacity
Junior	Estadio Metropolitano	46,000
Deportivo Cali	Estadio Olímpico Pascual Guerrero	45,000
Nacional, Medellín	Estadio Atanasio Girardot	41,000
Millonarios, Santa Fe	Estadio El Campín	36,000
América de Cali	Estadio Olímpico Pascual Guerrero	45,000
Cúcuta Deportivo	Estadio General Santander	42,000
Once Caldas	Estadio Palogrande	29,000
Deportes Tolima	Estadio Manuel Murillo Toro	28,000
Deportivo Pereira	Estadio Hernán Ramírez Villegas	30,000
Deportes Quindío	Estadio Centenario	20,000
Deportivo Pasto	Estadio Departamental Libertad	19,000
Atletico Bucaramanga	Estadio Alfonso Lopez	28,000
Atlético Huila	Estadio Guillermo Plazas Alcid	22,000
La Equidad	Estadio Metropolitano de Techo	17,000
Envigado	Estadio Polideportivo Sur	12,000
Boyacá Chicó	Estadio La Independencia	10,000

== Torneo Apertura ==
Torneo Apertura began on 1 February and ended on 6 July.

=== Standings ===
Pos	Team	Pld	W	D	L	GF	GA	GD	Pts	Qualification
1	La Equidad	18	10	5	3	25	13	+12	35	Advance to playoffs
2	Boyaca Chico	18	9	5	4	30	19	+11	32	Advance to playoffs
3	Santa Fe	18	9	4	5	25	18	+7	31	Advance to playoffs
4	Independiente Medellin	18	8	5	5	26	14	+12	29	Advance to playoffs
5	Envigado	18	8	4	6	20	20	0	28	Advance to playoffs
6	Deportivo Cali	18	7	6	5	19	21	−2	27	Advance to playoffs
7	America de Cali	18	8	2	8	34	28	+6	26	Advance to playoffs
8	Deportes Quindio	18	6	7	5	25	22	+3	25	Advance to playoffs
9	Cucuta Deportivo	18	7	4	7	20	17	+3	25	
10	Atletico Bucaramanga	18	8	1	9	20	24	−4	25	
11	Millonarios	18	6	6	6	23	23	0	24	
12	Junior	18	7	3	8	21	23	−2	24	
13	Atletico Huila	18	5	8	5	25	25	0	23	
14	Atletico Nacional	18	7	1	10	16	19	−3	22	
15	Once Caldas	18	5	4	9	20	28	−8	19	
16	Pasto	18	5	4	9	15	24	−9	19	
17	Pereira	18	5	4	9	21	33	−12	19	
18	Tolima	18	4	3	11	21	35	−14	15	

Updated to match(es) played on unknown. Source: RSSSF

=== Schedule ===
Fixture 1 - February 1 until February 3, 2008
Date	Home	Score	Away
February 1	Quindío	1 - 1	La Equidad
February 2	Millonarios	1 - 2	Medellín
February 2	Atlético Nacional	0 - 1	Santa Fe
February 3	América de Cali	1 - 1	Huila
February 3	Pereira	0 - 2	Envigado
February 3	Cúcuta	0 - 1	Bucaramanga
February 3	Junior	2 - 1	Once Caldas
February 3	Pasto	0 - 1	Boyacá Chicó
February 3	Tolima	2 - 0	Deportivo Cali

Fixture 2 - February 8 until February 10, 2008
Date	Home	Score	Away
February 8	Deportivo Cali	0 - 0	Millonarios
February 9	Envigado	2 - 1	Cúcuta
February 9	Santa Fe	2 - 1	América de Cali
February 9	Medellín	2 - 0	Pereira
February 10	Boyacá Chicó	1 - 1	Quíndio
February 10	Huila	0 - 0	Pasto
February 10	Bucaramanga	1 - 0	Junior
February 10	La Equidad	2 - 0	Tolima
February 10	Once Caldas	1 - 0	Atlético Nacional

Fixture 3 - February 15 until February 17, 2008
Date	Home	Score	Away
February 15	Atlético Nacional	3 - 0	Bucaramanga
February 16	América de Cali	3 - 1	Once Caldas
February 16	Junior	2 - 2	Envigado
February 17	Pasto	1 - 2	Santa Fe
February 17	Tolima	0 - 1	Quindío
February 17	Pereira	1 - 3	Deportivo Cali
February 17	Cúcuta	0 - 1	Medellín
February 17	Boyacá Chicó	2 - 0	Huila
February 17	Millonarios	2 - 1	La Equidad

Fixture 4 - February 20 until February 21, 2008
Date	Home	Score	Away
February 20	Quindío	1 - 1	Huila
February 20	Santa Fe	2 - 2	Boyacá Chicó
February 20	Once Caldas	3 - 1	Pasto
February 20	Bucaramanga	3 - 0	América de Cali
February 20	Tolima	1 - 1	Millonarios
February 20	Medellín	2 - 0	Junior
February 20	Deportivo Cali	0 - 1	Cúcuta
February 20	La Equidad	2 - 3	Pereira
February 21	Envigado	1 - 0	Atlético Nacional

Fixture 5 - February 23 until February 24, 2008
Date	Home	Score	Away
February 23	América de Cali	3 - 0	Envigado
February 23	Atlético Nacional	1 - 0	Medellín
February 24	Junior	1 - 2	Deportivo Cali
February 24	Millonarios	1 - 1	Quíndio
February 24	Pereira	0 - 0	Tolima
February 24	Cúcuta	0 - 1	La Equidad
February 24	Pasto	1 - 0	Bucaramanga
February 24	Boyacá Chicó	1 - 0	Once Caldas
February 24	Huila	2 - 3	Santa Fe

Fixture 6 - February 29 until March 2, 2008
Date	Home	Score	Away
February 29	Medellín	1 - 3	América de Cali
March 1	Deportivo Cali	2 - 1	Atlético Nacional
March 1	Bucaramanga	1 - 0	Boyacá Chicó
March 2	Envigado	0 - 1	Pasto
March 2	Once Caldas	1 - 1	Huila
March 2	Millonarios	3 - 0	Pereira
March 2	La Equidad	2 - 0	Junior
March 2	Tolima	0 - 0	Cúcuta
March 2	Quindío	2 - 1	Santa Fe

Fixture 7 - March 7 until March 9, 2008
Date	Home	Score	Away
March 7	Santa Fe	0 - 1	Once Caldas
March 8	Cúcuta	2 - 1	Millonarios
March 8	América de Cali	0 - 1	Deportivo Cali
March 9	Pasto	1 - 1	Medellín
March 9	Atlético Nacional	0 - 1	La Equidad
March 9	Pereira	2 - 0	Quíndio
March 9	Junior	1 - 3	Tolima
March 9	Huila	4 - 2	Bucaramanga
March 9	Boyacá Chicó	1 - 1	Envigado

Fixture 8 - March 15 & March 16, 2008
Date	Home	Score	Away
March 14	Deportivo Cali	1 - 1	Pasto
March 15	Tolima	1 - 2	Atlético Nacional
March 15	Medellín	0 - 0	Boyacá Chicó
March 16	La Equidad	4 - 0	América de Cali
March 16	Quíndio	1 - 2	Once Caldas
March 16	Envigado	1 - 1	Huila
March 16	Millonarios	3 - 1	Junior
March 16	Pereira	0 - 2	Cúcuta
March 16	Bucaramanga	1 - 2	Santa Fe

Fixture 9 - March 22 & March 23, 2008
Date	Home	Score	Away
March 22	Quindío	4 - 1	Boyacá Chicó
March 22	Deportivo Cali	0 - 4	América de Cali
March 22	Santa Fe	1 - 1	Millonarios
March 23	Bucaramanga	1 - 1	Cúcuta
March 23	Huila	3 - 2	Tolima
March 23	Once Caldas	1 - 1	Pereira
March 23	Envigado	1 - 0	Junior
March 23	La Equidad	1 - 1	Pasto
March 23	Medellín	2 - 0	Atlético Nacional

Fixture 10 - March 29 & March 30, 2008
Date	Home	Score	Away
March 29	Huila	1 - 1	Medellín
March 29	Atlético Nacional	1 - 1	Millonarios
March 29	Santa Fe	3 - 0	Envigado
March 30	Once Caldas	2 - 0	Bucaramanga
March 30	Cúcuta	4 - 3	Quindío
March 30	Junior	1 - 0	Pereira
March 30	América	3 - 1	Tolima
March 30	Pasto	1 - 2	La Equidad
March 30	Boyacá Chicó	0 - 0	Deportivo Cali

Fixture 11 - April 2, 2008
Date	Home	Score	Away
April 2	La Equidad	2 - 1	Boyacá Chicó
April 2	Envigado	2 - 0	Once Caldas
April 2	Medellín	2 - 0	Santa Fe
April 2	Tolima	1 - 2	Pasto
April 2	Millonarios	3 - 1	América de Cali
April 2	Deportivo Cali	2 - 1	Huila
April 2	Quindío	2 - 0	Bucaramanga
April 2	Cúcuta	0 - 0	Junior
April 2	Pereira	1 - 0	Atlético Nacional

Fixture 12 - April 5 & April 6, 2008
Date	Home	Score	Away
April 5	Huila	1 - 0	La Equidad
April 5	Santa Fe	2 - 0	Deportivo Cali
April 5	Boyacá Chicó	7 - 2	Tolima
April 6	Pasto	2 - 0	Millonarios
April 6	Atlético Nacional	3 - 1	Cúcuta
April 6	Junior	2 - 2	Quindío
April 6	América de Cali	4 - 1	Pereira
April 6	Bucaramanga	2 - 1	Envigado
April 6	Once Caldas	1 - 1	Medellín

Fixture 13 - April 12 & April 13, 2008
Date	Home	Score	Away
April 12	La Equidad	0 - 0	Santa Fe
April 12	Deportivo Cali	3 - 0	Once Caldas
April 12	Quindío	2 - 2	Envigado
April 12	Cúcuta	1 - 1	América de Cali
April 13	Medellín	5 - 0	Bucaramanga
April 13	Tolima	2 - 1	Huila
April 13	Millonarios	0 - 4	Boyacá Chicó
April 13	Pereira	5 - 2	Pasto
April 13	Junior	3 - 0	Atlético Nacional

Fixture 14 - April 18 until April 20, 2008
Date	Home	Score	Away
April 18	Envigado	1 - 0	Medellín
April 19	América de Cali	1 - 2	Junior
April 19	Atlético Nacional	1 - 0	Quindío
April 20	Boyacá Chicó	3 - 0	Pereira
April 20	Huila	3 - 3	Millonarios
April 20	Santa Fe	2 - 0	Tolima
April 20	Once Caldas	1 - 1	La Equidad
April 20	Bucaramanga	4 - 1	Deportivo Cali
April 20	Pasto	1 - 0	Cúcuta

Fixture 15 - April 25 until April 27, 2008
Date	Home	Score	Away
April 25	Quindío	1 - 0	Medellín
April 26	Millonarios	0 - 2	Santa Fe
April 26	Cúcuta	3 - 0	Boyacá Chicó
April 27	Atlético Nacional	3 - 2	América de Cali
April 27	Tolima	4 - 3	Once Caldas
April 27	La Equidad	1 - 0	Bucaramanga
April 27	Pereira	3 - 3	Huila
April 27	Junior	2 - 0	Pasto
April 27	Deportivo Cali	2 - 1	Envigado

Fixture 16 - May 3 & May 4, 2008
Date	Home	Score	Away
May 3	América de Cali	3 - 1	Quindío
May 3	Boyacá Chicó	2 - 1	Junior
May 3	Pasto	0 - 1	Atlético Nacional
May 4	Bucaramanga	1 - 0	Tolima
May 4	Huila	1 - 0	Cúcuta
May 4	Envigado	0 - 1	La Equidad
May 4	Medellín	1 - 1	Deportivo Cali
May 4	Santa Fe	1 - 1	Pereira
May 4	Once Caldas	0 - 2	Millonarios

Fixture 17 - May 10, 2008
Date	Home	Score	Away
May 10	La Equidad	2 - 1	Medellín
May 10	Junior	1 - 0	Atlético Huila
May 10	Atlético Nacional	0 - 1	Boyacá Chicó
May 10	Cúcuta	2 - 0	Santa Fe
May 10	Tolima	1 - 2	Envigado
May 10	Quindío	0 - 0	Deportivo Cali
May 10	Pereira	3 - 1	Once Caldas
May 10	América de Cali	2 - 0	Pasto
May 10	Millonarios	1 - 0	Bucaramanga

Fixture 18 - May 18, 2008
Date	Home	Score	Away
May 18	Bucaramanga	3 - 0	Pereira
May 18	Huila	1 - 0	Atlético Nacional
May 18	Boyacá Chicó	3 - 2	América de Cali
May 18	Deportico Cali	1 - 1	La Equidad
May 18	Pasto	0 - 2	Quindío
May 18	Envigado	1 - 0	Millonarios
May 18	Medellín	4 - 1	Tolima
May 18	Santa Fe	1 - 2	Junior
May 18	Once Caldas	1 - 2	Cúcuta

=== Cuadrangular playoffs ===
The second phase of the 2008 Apertura Tournament is disputed between the best eight teams in the first phase, which are distributed in two groups of four being divided by odd and even numbers. The winners of each group will advance to the Finals to define a champion.

==== Group A ====
Seed	Pos	Team	Pts	GP	W	D	L	GF	GA	GD
(7)	1.	América	13	6	4	1	1	11	4	+7
(5)	2.	Envigado	8	6	2	2	2	8	9	-1
(3)	3.	Santa Fe	7	6	2	1	3	6	8	-2
(1)	4.	La Equidad	5	6	1	2	3	4	8	-4

Tiebreak rules: 1)points; 2)goal difference; 3)goals scored

Fixture 1 - May 21, 2008
Home	Score	Away
La Equidad	0 - 2	América de Cali
Envigado	2 - 0	Santa Fe

Fixture 2 - May 24 and May 25, 2008
Date	Home	Score	Away
May 24	América de Cali	2 - 0	Envigado
May 25	Santa Fe	0 - 1	La Equidad

Fixture 3 - June 8, 2008
Home	Score	Away
América de Cali	3 - 0	Santa Fe
La Equidad	2 - 2	Envigado

Fixture 4 - June 22, 2008
Home	Score	Away
Santa Fe	2 - 0	América de Cali
Envigado	1 - 0	La Equidad

Fixture 5 - June 25, 2008
Home	Score	Away
Envigado	1 - 3	América de Cali
La Equidad	0 - 2	Santa Fe

Fixture 6 - June 29, 2008
Home	Score	Away
América de Cali	1 - 1	La Equidad
Santa Fe	2 - 2	Envigado

==== Group B ====
Seed	Pos	Team	Pts	GP	W	D	L	GF	GA	GD
(2)	1.	Boyacá Chicó	10	6	2	4	0	9	7	+2
(4)	2.	Independiente Medellín	9	6	2	3	1	10	4	+6
(8)	3.	Deportes Quindío	6	6	1	3	2	5	6	-1
(6)	4.	Deportivo Cali	5	5	1	2	3	6	13	-7

Tiebreak rules: 1)points; 2)goal difference; 3)goals scored

Fixture 1 - May 21, 2008
Home	Score	Away
Quindío	0 - 0	Medellín
Deportivo Cali	2 - 2	Boyacá Chicó

Fixture 2 - May 24 and May 25, 2008
Home	Score	Away
Medellín	5 - 0	Deportivo Cali
Boyacá Chicó	2 - 1	Quindío

Fixture 3 - June 8, 2008
Home	Score	Away
Medellín	1 - 1	Boyacá Chicó
Quindío	1 - 1	Deportivo Cali

Fixture 4 - June 22, 2008
Home	Score	Away
Boyacá Chicó	1 - 1	Medellín
Deportivo Cali	0 - 2	Quindío

Fixture 5 - June 25, 2008
Home	Score	Away
Deportivo Cali	2 - 1	Medellín
Quindío	1 - 1	Boyacá Chicó

Fixture 6 - June 29, 2008
Home	Score	Away
Medellín	2 - 0	Quindío
Boyacá Chicó	2 - 1	Deportivo Cali

=== Finals ===
2 July 2008 L1	América	1–1	Boyacá Chicó	Cali
	N. Salazar 19'	Report	A. Ramos 41'	Stadium: Estadio Pascual Guerrero; Attendance: 40,000

6 July 2008 L2	Boyacá Chicó	1–1 (4–2 p)	América	Tunja
	M. Caneo 34' (pen.)	Report	L. Tejada 82'	Stadium: Estadio La Independencia
	Penalties
	E. Velasquez (penalty missed); M. Caneo (penalty scored); O. Diaz (penalty scored); P. Pino (penalty scored); E. Palacios (penalty scored)		A. Berbia (penalty missed); J. Gonzalez (penalty scored); O. Restrepo (penalty scored); A. Ramos (penalty missed); P. Arango (penalty missed)

=== Top goalscorers ===
Pos.	Player	Team	Goals
1	(Colombia) Ivan Velásquez	Quindío	13
1	(Argentina) Miguel Caneo	Chicó	13
3	(Panama) Luis Tejada	América	12
4	(Colombia) Carlos Rentería	Huila	10
4	(Colombia) Léider Preciado	Santa Fe	10
4	(Colombia) Giovanni Moreno	Envigado	10
7	(Colombia) Roberto Polo	Equidad	9
8	(Peru) Johan Fano	Once Caldas	8
8	(Colombia) Neider Morantes	Envigado	8
10	(Colombia) Luis Fernando Mosquera	Santa Fe	7
10	(Argentina) Matías Urbano	Cúcuta	7

== Torneo Finalización ==
Torneo Finalizacion began on 19 July and ended on 21 December

=== Standings ===
Pos	Team	Pld	W	D	L	GF	GA	GD	Pts	Qualification
1	Deportes Tolima	18	10	3	5	22	16	+6	33	Advance to playoffs
2	Junior	18	10	1	7	27	19	+8	31	Advance to playoffs
3	Atletico Nacional	18	9	3	6	20	19	+1	30	Advance to playoffs
4	America de Cali	18	8	5	5	25	17	+8	29	Advance to playoffs
5	Independiente Medellin	18	9	2	7	24	19	+5	29	Advance to playoffs
6	Deportivo Pereira	18	8	5	5	23	20	+3	29	Advance to playoffs
7	La Equidad	18	8	5	5	18	16	+2	29	Advance to playoffs
8	Deportivo Cali	18	9	1	8	30	21	+9	28	Advance to playoffs
9	Millonarios	18	8	4	6	26	18	+8	28	
10	Once Caldas	18	7	6	5	20	20	0	27	
11	Santa Fe	18	7	5	6	18	15	+3	26	
12	Envigado	18	5	6	7	19	19	0	21	
13	Deportes Quindio	18	5	6	7	16	22	−6	21	
14	Boyaca Chico	18	6	2	10	17	24	−7	20	
15	Atletico Bucaramanga	18	4	8	6	13	23	−10	20	
16	Deportivo Pasto	18	3	7	8	9	17	−8	16	
17	Atletico Huila	18	3	6	9	17	26	−9	15	
18	Cucuta Deportivo	18	4	3	11	9	22	−13	15	

Updated to match(es) played on unknown. Source: RSSSF

=== Positions by round ===
Team ╲ Round	1	2	3	4	5	6	7	8	9	10	11	12	13	14	15	16	17	18
América	13	5	15	14	13	8	10	14	7	9	9	9	7	10	9	6	6	4
Boyacá Chicó	6	9	8	13	16	16	15	16	9	15	16	17	17	14	12	12	12	14
Atlético Bucaramanga	7	13	11	11	7	6	6	6	6	4	4	7	10	12	15	13	13	15
Cúcuta Deportivo	16	16	18	15	17	17	18	18	18	18	18	18	18	18	18	18	18	18
Deportivo Cali	12	7	2	6	9	11	7	9	11	8	7	5	2	2	2	5	3	8
Deportivo Pasto	17	11	10	10	14	14	17	13	14	10	10	15	16	17	17	17	17	16
Envigado	10	15	5	2	6	7	8	12	13	14	15	13	14	15	13	14	14	12
La Equidad	11	17	17	18	11	15	11	15	17	17	12	14	12	9	6	3	8	7
Huila	3	10	9	9	12	13	14	11	15	16	17	16	15	16	16	16	16	17
Junior	14	6	14	8	5	3	4	2	2	3	3	6	8	6	8	7	4	2
Independiente Medellín	15	18	16	17	18	18	16	17	16	11	11	10	6	8	4	2	2	5
Millonarios	5	8	3	1	1	4	2	4	4	5	8	4	5	3	3	8	10	9
Atlético Nacional	18	14	13	16	8	10	12	8	10	12	14	12	11	7	10	9	5	3
Once Caldas	4	12	4	4	3	5	5	5	5	7	6	8	13	13	11	11	11	10
Deportivo Pereira	8	2	12	12	15	9	13	7	8	6	5	3	4	5	7	4	9	6
Quindío	9	3	6	7	10	12	9	10	12	13	13	11	9	11	14	15	15	13
Santa Fe	1	4	7	3	2	1	3	3	3	2	2	2	3	4	5	10	7	11
Deportes Tolima	2	1	1	5	4	2	1	1	1	1	1	1	1	1	1	1	1	1

=== Cuadrangular Playoffs ===
The second phase of the 2008 Finalizacion takes two groups of four teams, divided by even and odd numbers. It is disputed between the best eight teams in the first phase. The winners of each group will advance to the Finals to define a champion. The first tie-breaking criterion is the team's position in the general standings.

==== Group A ====
Seed	Pos	Team	Pts	GP	W	D	L	GF	GA	GD
(5)	1.	Independiente Medellín	11	6	3	2	1	8	8	0
(1)	2.	Deportes Tolima	10	6	3	1	2	11	9	+2
(7)	3.	La Equidad	7	6	2	1	3	10	8	+2
(3)	4.	Atlético Nacional	4	6	0	4	2	4	8	-4

Fixture 1 - November 22 and 23, 2008
Date	Home	Score	Away
November 22	Medellín	2 - 1	Tolima
November 23	La Equidad	0 - 0	Atlético Nacional

Fixture 2 - November 27, 2008
Date	Home	Score	Away
November 27	Atlético Nacional	1 - 1	Medellín
November 27	Tolima	2 - 1	La Equidad

Fixture 3 - November 30, 2008
Date	Home	Score	Away
November 30	La Equidad	2 - 3	Medellín
November 30	Atlético Nacional	1 - 1	Tolima

Fixture 4 - December 7, 2008
Date	Home	Score	Away
December 7	Medellín	1 - 0	La Equidad
December 7	Tolima	2 - 1	Atlético Nacional

Fixture 5 - December 10, 2008
Date	Home	Score	Away
December 10	Medellín	0 - 0	Atlético Nacional
December 10	La Equidad	3 - 1	Tolima

Fixture 6 - December 14, 2008
Date	Home	Score	Away
December 14	Atlético Nacional	1 - 4	La Equidad
December 14	Tolima	4 - 1	Medellín

==== Group B ====
Seed	Pos	Team	Pts	GP	W	D	L	GF	GA	GD
(4)	1.	América de Cali	11	6	3	2	1	10	6	+4
(6)	3.	Deportivo Pereira	9	6	3	0	3	9	13	-4
(2)	2.	Junior	7	6	2	1	3	9	8	+1
(8)	4.	Deportivo Cali	7	6	2	1	3	8	9	-1

Fixture 1 - November 22 and 23, 2008
Date	Home	Score	Away
November 22	Junior	2 - 0	Deportivo Cali
November 23	América	3 - 0	Pereira

Fixture 2 - November 26, 2008
Date	Home	Score	Away
November 26	Deportivo Cali	2 - 2	América
November 26	Pereira	3 - 2	Junior

Fixture 3 - November 29, 2008
Date	Home	Score	Away
November 29	Deportivo Cali	3 - 0	Pereira
November 29	Junior	1 - 1	América

Fixture 4 - December 6, 2008
Date	Home	Score	Away
December 6	Pereira	3 - 1	Deportivo Cali
December 6	América	2 - 0	Junior

Fixture 5 - December 10, 2008
Date	Home	Score	Away
December 10	Junior	3 - 0	Pereira
December 10	América	1 - 0	Deportivo Cali

Fixture 6 - December 14, 2008
Date	Home	Score	Away
December 14	Deportivo Cali	2 - 1	Junior
December 14	Pereira	3 - 1	América

=== Finals ===
17 December 2008 L1	Independiente Medellín	0–1	América	Estadio Atanasio Girardot, Medellín
20:00 (UTC-5)		Report	Cortés 63'	Attendance: 44,642; Referee: Imer Machado

21 December 2008 L2	América	3–1 (4–1 agg.)	Independiente Medellín	Estadio Pascual Guerrero, Cali
17:30 (UTC-5)	G. Ramos 25'; J. Ramos 60' (o.g.); Córdoba 89'	Report	Álvarez 17'	Attendance: 42,000; Referee: Óscar Ruiz

=== Top goalscorers ===
Pos.	Player	Team	Goals
1	(Colombia) Fredy Montero	Deportivo Cali	16
2	(Colombia) Darwin Quintero	Deportivo Pereira	13
3	(Colombia) Teófilo Gutiérrez	Junior	12
4	(Colombia) Milton Rodríguez	Millonarios	11
4	(Colombia) Adrián Ramos	América de Cali	11
6	(Colombia) Wilson Carpintero	La Equidad	10
6	(Colombia) Jackson Martinez	Independiente Medellin	10
8	(Argentina) Rodrigo Marangoni	Deportes Tolima	9
9	(Colombia) Jorge Serna	Envigado	8

== Overall standings ==
Besides the Apertura and Finalizacion champions, the team with the best overall points earned will advance to the 2009 Copa Libertadores Group Stage. The team with the second best overall points will advance to 2009 Copa Libertadores Preliminary Round. The team with the third best overall points average advances to the 2009 Copa Sudamericana, along with the 2008 Copa Colombia champions.

Pos	Team	Pts	GP	W	D	L	GS	GA	GD	Qualification
1.	América de Cali	87	52	25	12	15	86	58	+28	2009 Copa Libertadores Group Stage
2.	Independiente Medellín	78	50	22	12	16	69	48	+22	2009 Copa Libertadores Preliminary round
3.	La Equidad	76	48	21	13	14	57	45	+12	2009 Copa Sudamericana first stage
4.	Deportivo Cali	64	48	19	10	19	63	64	-1	2009 Copa Sudamericana first stage
5.	Independiente Santa Fe	64	42	18	10	14	49	41	+8	
6.	Boyacá Chicó	64	44	17	13	14	58	52	+6	2009 Copa Libertadores Group stage
7.	Junior	62	42	19	5	18	57	50	+7	
8.	Deportes Tolima	58	42	17	7	18	54	60	-6	
9.	Envigado	57	42	15	12	15	47	48	-1	
10.	Deportivo Pereira	54	42	16	9	17	53	66	-13	
11.	Atlético Nacional	56	42	16	8	18	40	46	-6	
12.	Millonarios	52	36	14	10	12	49	41	+8	
13.	Deportes Quindío	52	42	12	16	14	46	50	-4	
14.	Once Caldas	46	36	12	10	14	40	48	-8	
15.	Atlético Bucaramanga	45	36	12	9	15	33	47	-14	
16.	Cúcuta Deportivo	40	36	11	7	18	29	39	-10	
17.	Atlético Huila	38	36	8	14	14	42	51	-9	
18.	Deportivo Pasto	35	36	8	11	17	24	41	-17	

== Relegation ==
The team with the worst points average from the last five seasons, (2006-I, 2006-II, 2007-I, 2007-II, 2008-I, and 2008-II) is relegated to the Second Division. The team with the second worst points average played a two-leg promotion playoff with the runner-up team from the Second Division.

Pos	Team	Pts	GP	GS	GA	GD	Avg	Result
1.	Atlético Nacional	183	108	143	104	+39	1.694	
2.	Cúcuta Deportivo	173	108	138	107	+31	1.602	
3.	Deportes Tolima	167	108	162	134	+28	1.546	
4.	Boyacá Chicó	161	108	128	114	+14	1.491	
5.	Deportivo Cali	160	108	143	120	+23	1.481	
6.	Independiente Medellín	158	108	149	139	+10	1.463	
7.	Millonarios	157	108	143	128	+15	1.454	
8.	Once Caldas	149	108	141	141	0	1.349	
9.	América de Cali	148	108	147	153	-6	1.370	
10.	Deportivo Pasto	145	108	122	114	+8	1.343	
11.	Deportes Quindío	144	108	126	135	-9	1.333	
12.	La Equidad	143	108	122	122	0	1.324	
13.	Independiente Santa Fe	143	108	140	146	-6	1.324	
14.	Atlético Huila	134	108	125	151	-26	1.241	
16.	Atletico Junior	133	108	128	154	-26	1.231	
16.	Deportivo Pereira	131	108	116	138	-22	1.213	
17.	Envigado	128	108	118	132	-14	1.185	Playoff
18.	Atlético Bucaramanga	126	108	115	151	-36	1.167	Relegated

=== Promotion/relegation playoff ===
Categoria Primera B runner ups Deportivo Rionegro qualified to the promotion playoff against Envigado, who finished 17th in the relegation table.

Team 1	Agg.	Team 2	1st leg	2nd leg
Deportivo Rionegro	1–3	Envigado	1–2	0–1

Envigado wins the playoff, and stays in Primera A. Deportivo Rionegro remain in Primera B.
