= Kelvin Osorio =

Colombian footballer (born 1993)

Personal information
- Full name: Kelvin David Osorio Antury
- Date of birth: 29 October 1993 (age 33)
- Place of birth: Florencia, Colombia
- Height: 1.81 m (5 ft 11 in)
- Position: Midfielder

Team information
- Current team: Deportivo Pereira
- Number: 33

Youth career
- Deportivo Cali
- Libertad

Senior career*
Years	Team	Apps	(Gls)
	Deportivo Cali	0	(0)
2014	Boca Juniors de Cali	10	(1)
2015–2017	Cortuluá	27	(1)
2017	Deportivo Pasto	2	(0)
2018–2019	Patriotas	54	(11)
2020–2023	Santa Fe	67	(12)
2022	→ Cuiabá (loan)	18	(0)
2023	Mushuc Runa	10	(0)
2024	Deportivo Cali	28	(1)
2025–	Deportivo Pereira	29	(1)
- * Club domestic league appearances and goals as of 12 December 2025

Kelvin David Osorio Antury (born 29 October 1993) is a Colombian footballer who plays as a midfielder for Deportivo Pereira.

== Career ==
As a youth player, Osorio joined the youth academy of Paraguayan side Libertad, where he experienced "uneven terrain and matches that seemed more like small battles, of excessive force, shouting and little football".

Osorio started his career with Deportivo Cali in the Colombian top flight.

In 2014, he signed for Colombian second division team Boca Juniors de Cali.

=== Cortuluá ===
Before the 2015 season, Osorio signed for Cortuluá in the Colombian top flight, where he made 32 appearances and scored 1 goal. On 3 September 2015, he debuted for Cortuluá during a 0–0 draw with Santa Fe. On 14 September 2016, Osorio scored his first goal for Cortuluá during a 2–0 win over Deportes Tolima.
