= Boyacá Chicó F.C. =

Association football club in Colombia

Boyacá Chicó
- Full name: Boyacá Chicó Fútbol Club S.A.
- Nicknames: Los Ajedrezados (The Checkered); El Campeón de Boyacá (The Champion of Boyacá)
- Founded: 26 March 2002; 24 years ago (as Bogotá Chicó); 18 January 2005; 21 years ago (relocation to Tunja)
- Ground: La Independencia
- Capacity: 20,630
- Owner: Eduardo Pimentel
- President: Nicolás Pimentel
- Head coach: Jhon Jaime Gómez
- League: Categoría Primera A
- 2025: Primera A, 18th of 20
- Website: chicofutbolclub.com
Home colours	Away colours

Boyacá Chicó Fútbol Club is a professional Colombian football team based in Tunja playing in the Categoría Primera A. The club was founded on March 26, 2002 in Bogotá as Deportivo Bogotá Chicó F.C., named after one of the city's neighborhoods. After gaining promotion from Primera B in 2003 and playing one more season in the capital, the club was relocated to its current ground and renamed Boyacá Chicó F.C. They play their home games at the Estadio de La Independencia stadium.

== History ==
The club was founded in 2002 as Chicó Futbol Club, after the neighborhood of Chicó, in the locality of Chapinero in Bogotá, where Eduardo Pimentel, the manager of the project and former player of Millonarios, América de Cali, Independiente Medellín, Deportivo Pereira and the Colombia national football team, was born. The club played their first season in Primera B that same year after buying a license from Cortuluá, and won the Primera B championship in 2003, beating Pumas de Casanare in the double-legged final series and earned promotion to Primera A. In their first season in the top flight, they advanced to the final stages of the Apertura tournament and avoided relegation at the end of the season, but relocated to Tunja in 2005 owing to poor attendances and a lack of sponsors as well as an invitation from the Boyacá Department government.

After its move to Tunja and the arrival of manager Alberto Gamero in 2006, Boyacá Chicó started enjoying consistent results which allowed them to reach the semifinals of the domestic championship in the 2006 Finalización and both tournaments of the 2007 season, qualifying for the 2008 Copa Libertadores. In 2008, the club won its first Primera A title, defeating América de Cali in the Torneo Apertura final. In 2016, after thirteen seasons in Primera A, the team was relegated. However, the club only spent one season in the second tier, being promoted back to the Primera A after winning the Primera B championship in 2017.

== Honours ==
=== Domestic ===
- Categoría Primera A
  - Winners (1): 2008–I
- Categoría Primera B
  - Winners (3): 2003, 2017, 2022
- Copa Colombia
  - Runners-up (1): 2011

== Performance in CONMEBOL competitions ==
The club has appeared in the Copa Libertadores twice, reaching the preliminary round in 2008 and the group stage in the 2009 edition.

Season	Competition	Round	Opponent	Home	Away	Agg.
2008	Copa Libertadores	FS	(Chile) Audax Italiano	4–3	0–1	4–4 (a)
2009	Copa Libertadores	GS	(Bolivia) Aurora	2–1	3–0	3rd
2009	Copa Libertadores	GS	(Brazil) Grêmio	0–1	0–3	3rd
2009	Copa Libertadores	GS	Universidad de Chile	3–0	0–3	3rd

== Players ==
=== Current squad ===
As of 24 September 2026

Note: Flags indicate national team as defined under FIFA eligibility rules; some limited exceptions apply. Players may hold more than one non-FIFA nationality.

No.	Pos.	Nation	Player
1	GK	COL	David Agudelo
2	DF	COL	Daniel Polanco
3	MF	COL	Camilo Quiceno
4	DF	COL	Jefferson Mena (captain)
5	DF	COL	Jhonier Alomía
6	MF	COL	Juan Carlos Díaz
7	FW	COL	Felipe Cifuentes
8	MF	COL	Sebastián Salazar
9	FW	COL	Isaac Camargo
10	MF	COL	Yesus Cabrera
11	MF	COL	Delio Ramírez
12	GK	COL	Branndon Zapata
13	DF	COL	Yaliston Martínez
14	DF	COL	Cristian Blanco
15	DF	COL	Sander Navarro
16	MF	COL	Santiago Mera

No.	Pos.	Nation	Player
17	MF	COL	Estiven Sarria
18	MF	COL	Junior Palacios
19	FW	COL	Julián Castillo
20	MF	COL	Sebastián Viveros
21	FW	COL	Jacobo Pimentel
22	MF	COL	Alejandro Maya
24	DF	COL	Cristian Mosquera
25	DF	COL	Juan Palma
—	GK	COL	Rogerio Caicedo
—	GK	COL	David Quintero
—	DF	COL	Arlen Banguero
—	MF	COL	Andrés Aedo
—	MF	COL	Oscar Caicedo
—	MF	COL	Juan Peñaloza
—	MF	COL	Jhon Romaña

== Notable players ==
- (Colombia) Juan Alejandro Mahecha (2005–2009), (2011–2014), (2015–2016)
- (Colombia) Ever Palacios (2005–2011)
- (Mexico) Mario García (2006–2013)
- (Colombia) Edwin Móvil (2006–2009), (2010–2014)
- (Colombia) Arley Palacios (2007–2008)
- (Colombia) Nestor Salazar (2007–2008)
- (Argentina) Miguel Caneo (2008–2011),(2016)
- (Colombia) Franky Oviedo (2008)
- (Colombia) Víctor Danilo Pacheco (2008)
- (Colombia) Yhonny Ramírez (2008–2011)
- (Colombia) Brahaman Sinisterra (2008)
- (Colombia) Edigson Velásquez (2008–2009)

== Managers ==
- (Argentina) Mario Vanemerak (January 2004 – December 2005)
- (Colombia) Alberto Gamero (January 2006 – December 2013)
- (Colombia) Eduardo Pimentel (January 2014 – December 2014)
- (Colombia) Eduardo Lara (January 2015 – May 2015)
- (Colombia) Eduardo Pimentel (May 2015 – December 2015)
- (Colombia) José Ricardo Pérez (November 2015 – February 2016)
- (Colombia) Darío Sierra (February 2016 – May 2016)
- (Colombia) Nelson Gómez (May 2016 – June 2016)
- (Colombia) Darío Sierra (July 2016 – September 2016)
- (Uruguay) Nelson Olveira (September 2016 – April 2017)
- (Colombia) Jhon Jaime Gómez (April 2017 – September 2020)
- (Colombia) Belmer Aguilar (September 2020 – December 2020)
- (Mexico) (Italy) Mario García (January 2021 – August 2023)
- (Colombia) Belmer Aguilar (August 2023 – December 2023)
- (Argentina) Miguel Caneo (January 2024 – February 2024)
- (Colombia) Jhon Jaime Gómez (February 2024 – October 2024)
- (Uruguay) Sergio Migliaccio (October 2024)
- (Colombia) Juan Carlos Álvarez (October 2024 – February 2025)
- (Paraguay) Roberto Torres (February 2025 – April 2025)
- (Colombia) Flabio Torres (April 2025 – February 2026)
- (Colombia) Jhon Jaime Gómez (February 2026 – Present)
