= Nelson Olveira =

Uruguayan footballer (born 1974)

Nelson Artigas Olveira Romero (born June 19, 1974) is a Uruguayan former professional footballer who played as a centre-back.

== Career ==
- (Uruguay) Fénix 1992
- (Uruguay) Peñarol 1993–2000
- (Uruguay) Fénix 2001
- (Uruguay) Huracán Buceo 2001
- (Peru) Alianza Lima 2002–2003
- (Argentina) Gimnasia y Esgrima de La Plata 2003–2004
- (Peru) San Martín de Porres 2004
- (Colombia) Independiente de Santa Fe 2005–2006
- (Uruguay) Peñarol 2006–2007
- (Venezuela) Estudiantes de Mérida 2007
- (Uruguay) Fénix 2008
- (Uruguay) Miramar Misiones 2009–2010
- (Uruguay) Boston River 2010–2011
- (Uruguay) Central Español 2011–2012

== Honours ==
Peñarol

- Uruguayan Primera División: 1993, 1994, 1995, 1996, 1997, 1999

Central Español

- Uruguayan Segunda División 2011–12
