= Envigado F.C. =

Colombian football club

Envigado FC
- Full name: Envigado Fútbol Club S.A.
- Nicknames: El Equipo Naranja (The Orange Team); Cantera de Héroes (Quarry of Heroes)
- Founded: 14 October 1989; 36 years ago
- Ground: Polideportivo Sur
- Capacity: 11,000
- President: Manuel Valero
- Head coach: Juan Manuel López
- League: Categoría Primera B
- 2025: Primera A, 17th of 20 (relegated by average)
- Website: www.envigadofc.co
Home colours	Away colours	Third colours

Envigado Fútbol Club (Spanish pronunciation: [embiˈɣaðo ˈfuðβol ˈkluβ]) is a Colombian professional football team based in Envigado, that currently plays in the Categoría Primera B. They play their home games at the Estadio Polideportivo Sur.

The club is renowned for the quality of its youth development and the number of international stars who have begun their careers with the team including James Rodríguez, Fredy Guarín, Juan Fernando Quintero, Jhon Córdoba, Mateus Uribe, Giovanni Moreno, Jhon Duran among others. It is frequently considered one of the best youth academies in South America, which is why it is known as "Cantera de Heroes" (Quarry of Heroes).

== History ==
The club was founded on 14 October 1989 and became the first team to earn promotion to the Colombian top flight as they won the inaugural Categoría Primera B tournament, held in 1991. In that tournament, they topped the final group ahead of Alianza Llanos, Club El Cóndor, and Atlético Huila.

Envigado were able to consolidate themselves as a Primera A team, reaching the final stages of the league for the first time in 1994 after placing eighth. They were eliminated in the semifinals, placing third in their group. They also made it to the final stages of the competition in the 2002 Apertura, in which they also placed third in their semifinal group, and the 2005 Apertura, in which they placed second in their group, one point behind the eventual finalists Santa Fe.

Envigado were relegated from the Primera A on 12 November 2006 after a 1–0 loss to Cúcuta Deportivo on the final round of the 2006 Finalización tournament, thus ending a 15-year spell in the top flight, but quickly bounced back by winning the 2007 Primera B tournament with a team led by debutant playmakers James Rodríguez and Giovanni Moreno and managed by Jesús Barrios. Envigado secured promotion back to the top flight by beating Academia in the finals of both of the season's short tournaments. The team was at risk of relegation in the following seasons, playing relegation play-offs in 2008 and 2010, but they defended successfully their Primera A status in both of them.

They made their best campaign in the top flight in the 2011 season, when they made it to the quarter-finals of both the Apertura and Finalización tournaments, which helped them place third in the season's aggregate table and achieve their first qualification for an international tournament, the 2012 Copa Sudamericana. There they were eliminated at the second stage after beating Unión Comercio from Peru 2–0 on aggregate and losing to Liverpool from Uruguay 2–1 on aggregate.

In November 2014, Envigado F.C. and its major shareholder Juan Pablo Upegui were included into the Specially Designated Nationals and Blocked Persons List (also known as the Clinton List) by the United States's Office of Foreign Assets Control (OFAC) due to their links with the drug cartel Oficina de Envigado (Envigado Office). Although not all of the club's transactions were found to be illicit, the U.S. Treasury verified that the club had been used by the organization for money laundering, after 10 years of investigations. Envigado was removed from the list on 26 April 2018, and shortly after it was announced that 55% of the club's shares had been sold to the equity fund ProFútbol.

In 2025, and following poor campaigns in the preceding seasons, Envigado ended a 17-year spell in the top flight as they were relegated to the second tier for the second time in their history. Their relegation was confirmed with six matches left in the season after they lost 2–1 to Atlético Bucaramanga on 4 October.

== Honours ==
=== Domestic ===
- Categoría Primera B
  - Winners (2): 1991, 2007

== Players ==
=== Current squad ===
As of 27 September 2026

Note: Flags indicate national team as defined under FIFA eligibility rules; some limited exceptions apply. Players may hold more than one non-FIFA nationality.

No.	Pos.	Nation	Player
1	GK	COL	Jaime Mora
2	DF	COL	Didier Palacios
5	DF	COL	Santiago Noreña
6	MF	COL	Julián Palacios
7	FW	PAN	Didier Dawson
8	FW	COL	Rubio César España
9	FW	COL	Ángelo Rodríguez
10	FW	COL	Joao Rodríguez
12	GK	COL	Matías Villa
13	FW	COL	Juan José Rey
14	DF	COL	Mateo Betancurt
15	DF	COL	Gendry Cuervo
17	DF	COL	Yeferson Rodallega
18	MF	COL	William Hurtado

No.	Pos.	Nation	Player
19	FW	COL	Stiwart Acuña (on loan from Junior)
20	MF	COL	Juan José Cataño
22	DF	COL	Juan Palacios
25	MF	COL	Jesús Cuero
27	DF	COL	Juan Quejada
28	DF	COL	Jhon Gamboa
33	DF	COL	Emanuel Londoño
77	FW	COL	Dairon Valencia
80	MF	COL	Juan Aristizábal
88	GK	COL	Andrés Tovar
99	FW	COL	Miguel Marulanda
—	MF	COL	Jhojan Nieva
—	FW	COL	Jefferson Palacios

=== Out on loan ===
Note: Flags indicate national team as defined under FIFA eligibility rules; some limited exceptions apply. Players may hold more than one non-FIFA nationality.

No.	Pos.	Nation	Player
—	DF	COL	Neymar Uribe (at Barranquilla)

== Managers ==
- (Colombia) Hugo Castaño (1989–1991)
- (Colombia) Luis Augusto García (1992)
- (Colombia) Fernando Castro (1993–1995)
- (Colombia) Gabriel Gómez (1995–1997)
- (Colombia) Norberto Peluffo (1997–1998)
- (Colombia) Carlos Navarrete (2002–2004)
- (Colombia) Orlando Restrepo (2005)
- (Colombia) Carlos Navarrete (2006)
- (Colombia) Jesús Barrios (2007 – October 2008)
- (Colombia) Óscar Aristizábal (December 2008 – November 2009)
- (Colombia) Rubén Dario Bedoya (November 2009 – June 2010)
- (Colombia) Pedro Sarmiento (July 2010 – April 2013)
- (Colombia) Juan Carlos Sánchez (April 2013 – May 2016)
- (Spain) Ismael Rescalvo (June 2016 – August 2017)
- (Colombia) Rubén Darío Bedoya (August 2017 – August 2018)
- (Colombia) Juan Carlos Ramírez (September 2018 – December 2018)
- (Colombia) Eduardo Lara (January 2019 – September 2019)
- (Spain) José Arastey (September 2019 – March 2021)
- (Colombia) Andrés Orozco (March 2021 – April 2021)
- (Colombia) Alberto Suárez (May 2021 – July 2023)
- (Colombia) Andrés Orozco (July 2023 – September 2023)
- (Colombia) Dayron Pérez (September 2023 – April 2024)
- (Colombia) Alexis Márquez (April 2024 – September 2024)
- (Colombia) Andrés Orozco (September 2024 – March 2026)
- (Colombia) Alberto Suárez (March 2026 – September 2026)
- (Argentina) Juan Manuel López (September 2026 – Present)

Source: Worldfootball.net
