= 1959 Campeonato Profesional =

Campeonato Profesional
- Season: 1959
- Champions: Millonarios (5th title)
- Matches: 262
- Goals: 914 (3.49 per match)
- Top goalscorer: Felipe Marino (35)
- Biggest home win: Santa Fe 8–0 Cúcuta Deportivo
- Biggest away win: Deportes Tolima 1–5 Millonarios; Deportivo Cali 1–5 Deportivo Pereira; Deportivo Pereira 0–4 Millonarios
- Highest scoring: Atlético Bucaramanga 6–3 América; Atlético Nacional 7–2 Medellín; Deportes Tolima 6–3 Atlético Bucaramanga; Deportivo Pereira 5–4 Deportes Tolima

The 1959 Campeonato Profesional (1959 Professional Championship) was the 12th season of Colombia's top-flight football league. 12 teams compete against one another and played each weekend. Millonarios won the league for the 5th time in its history after getting 58 points. Santa Fe, the defending champion, was 8th with 40 points.

== Background ==
Twelve teams competed in the tournament: Deportivo Cali, Independiente Medellín and Unión Magdalena returned, while Atlético Manizales was dissolved. Millonarios won the championship for fifth time.

== League system ==
Every team played four games against each other team, two at home and two away. Teams received two points for a win and one point for a draw. If two or more teams were tied on points, places were determined by goal difference. The team with the most points is the champion of the league.

== Teams ==
Locations of the 1956 Campeonato Profesional teams:
- 1. Armenia
- 2. Bogotá
- 3. Bucaramanga
- 4. Cali
- 5. Cúcuta
- 6. Ibagué
- 7. Medellín
- 8. Pereira
- 9. Santa Marta

Team	City	Stadium
América	Cali	Estadio Olímpico Pascual Guerrero
Atlético Bucaramanga	Bucaramanga	Estadio Alfonso López
Atlético Nacional	Medellín	Estadio Atanasio Girardot
Atlético Quindío	Armenia	Estadio San José de Armenia
Cúcuta Deportivo	Cúcuta	Estadio General Santander
Deportes Tolima	Ibagué	Estadio 10 de Mayo
Deportivo Cali	Cali	Estadio Olímpico Pascual Guerrero
Deportivo Pereira	Pereira	Estadio Alberto Mora Mora
Independiente Medellín	Medellín	Estadio Atanasio Girardot
Millonarios	Bogotá	Estadio El Campín
Santa Fe	Bogotá	Estadio El Campín
Unión Magdalena	Santa Marta	Estadio Eduardo Santos

== Final standings ==
Pos	Team	Pld	W	D	L	GF	GA	GD	Pts	Qualification
1	Millonarios (C)	44	22	14	8	85	52	+33	58	1960 Copa Libertadores First Round
2	Independiente Medellín	44	20	12	12	84	65	+19	52	
3	Deportivo Cali	44	18	14	12	79	64	+15	50	
4	Deportivo Pereira	43	18	10	15	94	91	+3	46	
5	Atlético Nacional	43	16	10	17	87	87	0	42	
6	Cúcuta Deportivo	44	13	16	15	80	85	−5	42	
7	Atlético Bucaramanga	44	15	11	18	69	76	−7	41	
8	Santa Fe	42	14	12	16	76	68	+8	40	
9	Atlético Quindío	44	13	14	17	60	70	−10	40	
10	Unión Magdalena	44	13	12	19	51	72	−21	38	
11	Deportes Tolima	44	12	14	18	78	95	−17	38	
12	América	44	12	13	19	71	89	−18	37	

Source: RSSSF
(C) Champions

=== Results ===
==== First turn ====
Home \ Away	AME	BUC	CAL	CUC	MAG	MED	MIL	NAC	PER	QUI	SFE	TOL
América		2–1	1–2	1–1	6–2	2–4	1–2	3–3	2–2	3–0	1–1	3–1
Atlético Bucaramanga	6–3		1–1	3–1	0–1	1–1	1–1	5–2	3–1	1–0	0–2	2–3
Deportivo Cali	4–1	3–1		0–0	1–1	3–1	2–2	3–2	1–1	2–0	1–1	2–2
Cúcuta Deportivo	0–1 (Note: Awarded by walkover)	3–2	3–1		5–3	3–0	2–4	0–1	3–1	1–1	1–1	4–0
Unión Magdalena	2–1	1–3	2–0	2–0		0–2	0–2	0–0	3–1	2–0	0–2	3–1
Independiente Medellín	2–2	0–0	3–1	3–3	1–1		3–0	2–3	5–2	1–0	5–1	2–3
Millonarios	4–1	1–1	0–1	3–3	4–1	1–1		4–1	2–2	1–0	2–0	1–0
Atlético Nacional	2–3	1–1	2–1	2–3	3–3	7–2	0–1		1–4	5–1	3–3	6–1
Deportivo Pereira	4–1	4–2	4–1	2–2	1–0	1–3	2–4	3–1		0–1	2–2	1–1
Atlético Quindío	0–0	1–2	1–2	4–2	0–2	1–2	1–0	1–0	2–1		0–3	1–0
Santa Fe	3–1	4–2	0–2	8–0	4–2	3–0	1–0	1–2	6–1	2–2		2–2
Deportes Tolima	1–2	6–3	2–1	1–3	3–1	1–2	1–5	3–3	1–3	4–3	1–3	

Legend: Blue = home team win; Yellow = draw; Red = away team win.

==== Second turn ====
Home \ Away	AME	BUC	CAL	CUC	MAG	MED	MIL	NAC	PER	QUI	SFE	TOL
América		3–1	1–2	1–1	0–0	2–1	2–3	1–2	2–2	3–2	3–1	2–2
Atlético Bucaramanga	1–1		0–0	2–2	1–0	2–0	2–1	2–1	1–4	1–1	2–0	2–1
Deportivo Cali	1–0	1–0		2–1	4–0	0–0	1–2	7–0	1–5	3–1	6–1	3–2
Cúcuta Deportivo	3–1	2–1	3–1		1–1	1–1	1–1	3–3	5–1	1–3	3–2	3–3
Unión Magdalena	1–2	2–0	1–1	1–0		2–0	1–1	0–1	2–1	2–2	1–0	1–1
Independiente Medellín	1–1	3–4	3–2	1–1	5–0		2–1	3–0	3–2	1–1	2–0	1–1
Millonarios	5–2	1–2	1–1	3–1	1–1	0–1		3–2	3–0	4–3	1–0	2–1
Atlético Nacional	1–0 (Note: Awarded by walkover)	3–1	4–1	2–1	1–1	0–3	1–1		4–3	0–1	2–0	6–1
Deportivo Pereira	4–1	3–1	2–2	2–1	3–1	2–1	0–4	4–2		2–2	2–1	5–4
Atlético Quindío	3–0	2–1	2–1	3–3	4–1	0–2	1–1	2–1	2–2		1–1	2–2
Santa Fe	2–2	2–0	2–2	3–0	2–0	0–3	2–2	– (Note: Matches not played)	–	1–1		2–3
Deportes Tolima	3–0	1–1	2–2	3–0	1–0	4–2	0–0	1–1	1–2	1–1	2–1	

Legend: Blue = home team win; Yellow = draw; Red = away team win.

=== Top goalscorers ===
Rank	Name	Club	Goals
1	(Argentina) Felipe Marino	Cúcuta Deportivo / Independiente Medellín	35
2	(Argentina) Oswaldo Pazzuto	Santa Fe	26
3	(Colombia) Eusebio Escobar	Deportivo Pereira	25
4	(Paraguay) Casimiro Ávalos	Deportivo Pereira	24
5	(Argentina) Camilo Cervino	Deportivo Cali	22
5	(Colombia) Eladio Álvarez	Atlético Nacional	22
7	(Argentina) Juan Manuel López	Deportivo Cali	21
8	(Argentina) José Giarrizzo	Atlético Bucaramanga	20
8	(Argentina) Walter Marcolini	Millonarios	20
10	(Uruguay) Luis Miloc	Cúcuta Deportivo	19

Source: RSSSF.com Colombia 1959
