= Perales =

Perales (Spanish: pear trees) may refer to:

== Places ==
- Perales, Palencia, Castile and León, Spain
- Perales, Los Santos, Panama
- Perales del Alfambra, in Teruel, Aragón, Spain
- Perales del Puerto, in Cáceres, Extremadura, Spain
- Perales del Río, a neighbourhood of Getafe, in Madrid, Spain
- Perales Airport, in Ibagué, Tolima, Colombia

== People ==
- Agapito Perales (1919–1994), Peruvian footballer, brother of Constantino and Enrique
- Alejandra Perales (born 1992), Mexican volleyball player
- Alfonso Perales (1954–2006), Spanish historian and politician
- Alonso S. Perales (1898–1960), American lawyer, diplomat, and civil rights activist
- Cesar A. Perales (born 1940), American Civil Rights Attorney
- Constantino Perales (1929–2020), Peruvian footballer, brother of Agapito and Enrique
- Devin Perales (born 1993), American soccer player
- Enrique Perales (1914–2002), Peruvian footballer, brother of Agapito and Constantino
- Eva Perales (born 1973), Spanish TV personality
- Fernando Martínez Perales, Spanish footballer
- Francisca Perales (born 1985), Chilean politician
- Henry Perales (1947–2021), Peruvian footballer
- Israel Perales (1972–2015), better known by his stage name Mexicano 777, Puerto Rican rapper
- Jaime Perales Contreras (born 1963), Mexican cultural critic, public commentator and scholar
- Jesús Alberto Perales (born 1993), Mexican volleyball player
- José Perales (born 1993), Spanish footballer
- José Luis Perales (born 1945), Spanish singer
- Juan de Dios Ramírez Perales, Mexican footballer
- Narciso Perales (1914–1993), Spanish Falangist politician
- Priscila Perales (born 1983), Mexican beauty queen
- Rick Perales (born 1959), American politician from the state of Ohio
- Teresa Perales (born 1975), Spanish paralympic swimmer, politician and motivational speaker
- Valentín Perales (born 1995), Argentine footballer
- Víctor Perales (born 1990), Mexican footballer

== Other ==
- Perales River
