= Pedro Sarmiento =

Colombian footballer and manager (1956–2024)

Personal information
- Full name: Pedro Enrique Sarmiento Solís
- Date of birth: 26 October 1956
- Place of birth: Medellín, Colombia
- Date of death: 30 October 2024 (aged 68)
- Place of death: Medellín, Colombia
- Height: 1.75 m (5 ft 9 in)
- Position: Midfielder

Youth career
- Atlético Nacional

Senior career*
Years	Team	Apps	(Gls)
1976–1984	Atlético Nacional	346	(23)
1985–1989	América de Cali	101	(2)
Total		488	(26)

International career
1980–1985	Colombia	37	(3)

Managerial career
- 1992–1994: América de Cali (assistant)
- 1995–1998: Colombia (assistant)
- 2002–2003: Independiente Medellín (assistant)
- 2003: Colombia (assistant)
- 2004–2005: Independiente Medellín
- 2005–2006: Deportivo Cali
- 2006–2007: Santa Fe
- 2008: Cúcuta Deportivo
- 2009: Deportivo Pereira
- 2010–2013: Envigado
- 2013–2014: Independiente Medellín
- 2016: Rionegro Águilas
- 2019: Unión Magdalena
- 2022: Atlético Nacional (assistant)
- 2022: Atlético Nacional (interim)
- 2023: Once Caldas
- * Club domestic league appearances and goals

Pedro Enrique Sarmiento Solís (26 October 1956 – 30 October 2024) was a Colombian football manager and player.

== Playing career ==
=== Club ===
Born in Medellín, Sarmiento played for Atlético Nacional and América de Cali during his professional career. After winning several national club titles he became a trainer. In 2004, he won the fourth title for Independiente Medellín.

=== International ===
Sarmiento made 37 appearances for the senior Colombia national team from 1980 to 1985, including participating in nine qualifying matches for the 1982 and 1986 FIFA World Cups and the 1983 Copa América.

He also played for Colombia at the 1980 Olympic Games in the Moscow.

== Managerial career ==
After retiring from playing, Sarmiento became a manager. He started as an assistant to Francisco Maturana at América de Cali and later joined the coaching staffs of Norberto Peluffo at the Colombia national under-23 football team, Hernán Darío Gómez and Francisco Maturana at the senior national team, and Víctor Luna at Independiente Medellín from 2002 to 2003. In 2004 he became the incumbent manager of Independiente Medellín, with whom he won the 2004 Apertura tournament, and one year later he led Deportivo Cali to the title in the 2005 Finalización and a runner-up finish in the 2006 Apertura. Sarmiento also managed Santa Fe, Cúcuta Deportivo, Deportivo Pereira, Envigado, Águilas Doradas, Atlético Nacional (as interim manager), and Once Caldas.

== Death ==
Sarmiento died of polycythemia, a red blood cell disorder, on 30 October 2024, at the age of 68.
