= Efraín Sánchez =

Colombian footballer (1926–2020)

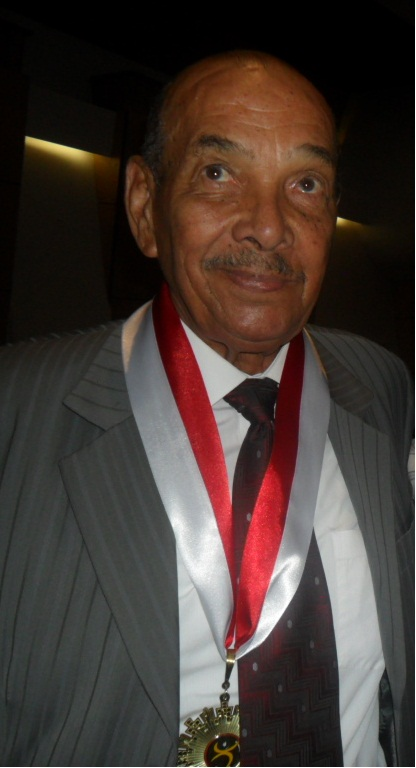
- Sánchez in 2012

Personal information
- Full name: Efraín Elías Sánchez Casimiro
- Date of birth: February 26, 1926
- Place of birth: Barranquilla, Colombia
- Date of death: January 16, 2020 (aged 93)
- Place of death: Bogotá, Colombia
- Position: Goalkeeper

Senior career*
Years	Team	Apps	(Gls)
1944	Millonarios		
1945	Once Caldas		
1946	La Fortuna		
1947–1949	San Lorenzo		
1950	América de Cali		
1951	Deportivo Cali		
1952	Junior		
1953–1954	Santa Fe		
1955–1957	Medellín		
1958–1960	Atlas		
1960–1963	Medellín		
1964	Millonarios		

International career
1947–1962	Colombia	30	(0)

Managerial career
- 1963: Colombia
- 1975: Colombia
- 1983–1984: Colombia
- * Club domestic league appearances and goals

Efraín Elías "El Caimán" Sánchez Casimiro (26 February 1926 – 16 January 2020) was a Colombian footballer who played as goalkeeper. He competed for the Colombia national football team at the 1962 FIFA World Cup which was held in Chile. Among other teams, he played for San Lorenzo of Argentina in the 1940s. He won the Colombian league title three times during his career. He also managed the national team in three separate spells, leading them to the 1975 Copa America final.

== Career ==
Sánchez played for Mexican side Club Atlas in 1959.

After retiring as a player Sánchez went into management, taking charge of the Colombia national team on three occasions.

== Honours ==
=== Club ===
Independiente Medellín

- Campeonato Profesional: 1955, 1957

Los Millonarios Bogotá

- Campeonato Profesional: 1964
