= 1957 Campeonato Profesional =

Campeonato Profesional
- Season: 1957
- Champions: Independiente Medellín (2nd title)
- Matches: 213
- Goals: 744 (3.49 per match)
- Top goalscorer: José Grecco (30)
- Biggest home win: Independiente Medellín 8–1 Deportivo Pereira
- Biggest away win: Bucaramanga 0–4 Independiente Medellín; Deportivo Pereira 2–6 Independiente Medellín
- Highest scoring: Independiente Medellín 9–5 Santa Fe

The 1957 Campeonato Profesional was the tenth season of Colombia's top-flight football league. The tournament consisted of a first stage, a cancelled octagonal stage, and a two-group second stage, and ended on 13 April 1958. 12 teams participated in the tournament. Independiente Medellín won the league for 2nd time in its history after defeating Cúcuta Deportivo in the championship playoff with an aggregate score of 8–3. Atlético Quindío, the defending champion, was 3rd in the first stage with 24 points, and was then eliminated in the second stage.

== Background ==
12 teams competed in the tournament. Libertad de Barranquilla was the only team from the previous season who did not participate.

== League system ==
Teams received two points for a win and one point for a draw. On the first stage, every team played two games against each other team, one at home and one away, and the first 8 teams qualified for the octagonal stage. From this stage, the team with most points would be the champion of the season, however the stage was cancelled after 8 matches due to claims from the teams eliminated in the first stage. Then, a second stage was played, with two groups of six teams each. The champion of each group played a playoff, and the champion of it played a champion playoff against the champion of the first stage.

== Teams ==
Locations of the 1956 Campeonato Profesional teams:
- 1. Armenia
- 2. Bogotá
- 3. Bucaramanga
- 4. Cali
- 5. Cúcuta
- 6. Ibagué
- 7. Medellín
- 8. Pereira
- 9. Santa Marta

Team	City	Stadium
América	Cali	Estadio Olímpico Pascual Guerrero
Atlético Bucaramanga	Bucaramanga	Estadio Alfonso López
Atlético Nacional	Medellín	Estadio Atanasio Girardot
Atlético Quindío	Armenia	Estadio San José de Armenia
Boca Juniors	Cali	Estadio Olímpico Pascual Guerrero
Cúcuta Deportivo	Cúcuta	Estadio General Santander
Deportes Tolima	Ibagué	Estadio Gustavo Rojas Pinilla
Deportivo Pereira	Pereira	Estadio Alberto Mora Mora
Independiente Medellín	Medellín	Estadio Atanasio Girardot
Millonarios	Bogotá	Estadio El Campín
Santa Fe	Bogotá	Estadio El Campín
Unión Magdalena	Santa Marta	Estadio Eduardo Santos

== First stage ==
Pos	Team	Pld	W	D	L	GF	GA	GD	Pts	Qualification
1	Independiente Medellín	22	16	4	2	69	31	+38	36	Qualified to Octagonal Stage (and later also added to Champion Playoff)
2	Boca Juniors	22	12	5	5	43	26	+17	29	Qualified to Octagonal Stage
3	Atlético Quindío	22	10	4	8	34	30	+4	24	Qualified to Octagonal Stage
4	Deportivo Pereira	22	9	6	7	42	51	−9	24	Qualified to Octagonal Stage
5	Cúcuta Deportivo	22	7	8	7	37	38	−1	22	Qualified to Octagonal Stage
6	Santa Fe	22	7	7	8	52	52	0	21	Qualified to Octagonal Stage
7	Unión Magdalena	22	7	7	8	32	32	0	21	Qualified to Octagonal Stage
8	Deportes Tolima	22	7	6	9	41	47	−6	20	Qualified to Octagonal Stage
9	América	22	8	3	11	39	46	−7	19	
10	Atlético Nacional	22	6	5	11	31	41	−10	17	
11	Atlético Bucaramanga	22	6	4	12	28	37	−9	16	
12	Millonarios	22	4	7	11	25	42	−17	15	

Source: RSSSF

=== Results ===
Home \ Away	AME	BJ	BUC	CUC	MAG	MED	MIL	NAC	PER	QUI	SFE	TOL
América		1–4	3–2	3–2	1–0	1–2	0–2	4–1	2–1	4–0	5–5	1–0
Boca Juniors	3–0		1–0	2–2	2–0	2–2	2–0	3–1	2–2	1–0	3–0	2–2
Atlético Bucaramanga	3–1	1–0		2–0	0–0	0–4	2–2	0–1	2–1	2–3	1–1	0–1
Cúcuta Deportivo	2–1	2–2	3–1		3–2	0–0	3–1	2–1	0–0	4–5	2–1	3–1
Unión Magdalena	4–2	0–2	1–2	0–0		2–0	1–1	3–1	3–0	0–0	1–2	3–1
Independiente Medellín	3–1	2–1	3–2	4–2	6–1		4–1	1–2	8–1	2–1	9–5	4–3
Millonarios	2–2	1–0	3–4	2–2	1–3	1–3		1–1	1–1	0–1	1–1	1–2
Atlético Nacional	2–1	0–3	2–2	0–0	1–2	0–2	3–0		2–3	0–0	3–4	5–3
Deportivo Pereira	4–3	2–1	1–0	3–2	3–3	2–6	3–0	1–0		2–1	4–1	4–4
Atlético Quindío	1–1	0–1	1–0	1–1	2–1	1–2	0–1	3–1	5–0		3–2	1–2
Santa Fe	2–0	6–1	4–2	4–1	0–0	1–1	2–3	1–2	3–3	1–2		4–3
Deportes Tolima	1–2	2–5	1–0	2–1	2–2	1–1	2–0	2–2	2–1	2–3	2–2	

Legend: Blue = home team win; Yellow = draw; Red = away team win.

== Octagonal (canceled) ==
Pos	Team	Pld	W	D	L	GF	GA	GD	Pts
1	Independiente Medellín	3	3	0	0	13	4	+9	6
2	Atlético Quindío	2	2	0	0	3	1	+2	4
3	Unión Magdalena	2	1	1	0	4	2	+2	3
4	Deportivo Pereira	3	1	0	2	6	6	0	2
5	Santa Fe	2	0	1	1	4	5	−1	1
6	Deportes Tolima	1	0	0	1	0	1	−1	0
7	Boca Juniors	1	0	0	1	0	2	−2	0
8	Cúcuta Deportivo	2	0	0	2	2	11	−9	0

Source: RSSSF

=== Results ===
Home \ Away	BJ	CUC	MAG	MED	PER	QUI	SFE	TOL
Boca Juniors		– (Note: Matches not played)	–	–	–	–	–	–
Cúcuta Deportivo	–		–	–	1–4	–	–	–
Unión Magdalena	2–0	–		–	–	–	–	–
Independiente Medellín	–	7–1	–		3–1	–	–	–
Deportivo Pereira	–	–	–	–		1–2	–	–
Atlético Quindío	–	–	–	–	–		–	1–0
Santa Fe	–	–	2–2	2–3	–	–		–
Deportes Tolima	–	–	–	–	–	–	–	

Legend: Blue = home team win; Yellow = draw; Red = away team win.

== Second stage ==
=== Group A ===
Pos	Team	Pld	W	D	L	GF	GA	GD	Pts
1	Independiente Medellín	10	5	2	3	24	16	+8	12
2	Deportivo Pereira	10	5	2	3	23	18	+5	12
3	Deportes Tolima	10	4	4	2	22	19	+3	12
4	Atlético Quindío	10	2	6	2	18	18	0	10
5	Atlético Nacional	10	3	3	4	17	16	+1	9
6	Unión Magdalena	10	0	5	5	10	27	−17	5

Source: RSSSF

=== Group A results ===
Home \ Away	MAG	MED	NAC	PER	QUI	TOL
Unión Magdalena		0–3	0–0	2–2	1–1	1–4
Independiente Medellín	5–0		2–1	5–3	0–2	3–5
Atlético Nacional	3–0	1–1		3–2	1–3	3–1
Deportivo Pereira	4–1	2–0	2–1		2–1	1–1
Atlético Quindío	4–4	2–2	2–2	0–3		3–3
Deportes Tolima	1–1	0–3	3–2	4–2	0–0	

Legend: Blue = home team win; Yellow = draw; Red = away team win.

==== First-place playoff ====
Pos	Team	Pld	W	D	L	GF	GA	GD	Pts
1	Deportes Tolima	4	2	1	1	8	6	+2	5
2	Deportivo Pereira	4	2	1	1	7	6	+1	5
3	Independiente Medellín	4	1	0	3	5	8	−3	2

Source: RSSSF

=== Playoff results ===
Home \ Away	MED	PER	TOL
Independiente Medellín		1–2	2–0
Deportivo Pereira	2–1		2–2
Deportes Tolima	4–1	2–1	

Legend: Blue = home team win; Yellow = draw; Red = away team win.

=== Group B ===
Pos	Team	Pld	W	D	L	GF	GA	GD	Pts
1	Cúcuta Deportivo	10	6	2	2	19	14	+5	14
2	Atlético Bucaramanga	10	5	2	3	15	9	+6	12
3	Santa Fe	10	4	2	4	14	12	+2	10
4	Millonarios	10	4	2	4	13	15	−2	10
5	Boca Juniors	10	3	2	5	10	14	−4	8
6	América	10	3	0	7	10	17	−7	6

Source: RSSSF

=== Group B results ===
Home \ Away	AME	BJ	BUC	CUC	MIL	SFE
América		2–1	0–1	0–1	1–0	1–2
Boca Juniors	1–2		1–1	3–0	0–1	1–0
Atlético Bucaramanga	2–1	2–0		0–0	4–1	3–0
Cúcuta Deportivo	4–3	4–0	3–1		2–1	1–1
Millonarios	3–0	2–2	1–0	3–1		1–1
Santa Fe	2–0	0–1	2–1	2–3	4–0	

Legend: Blue = home team win; Yellow = draw; Red = away team win.

=== Final ===
16 February 1958

Cúcuta Deportivo	1–0	Deportes Tolima
Zapirain 18'	Report

Estadio General Santander, Cúcuta
Referee: José Sundheim

23 February 1958

Deportes Tolima	2–1	Cúcuta Deportivo
H. Pérez 30'; L. Rodríguez 54' (o.g.)	Report	Serrano 70'

Estadio Gustavo Rojas Pinilla, Ibagué
Referee: Jaime Téllez

15 March 1958

Deportes Tolima	1–1	Cúcuta Deportivo
Coll 27'	Report	Galeano 67'

Estadio Atanasio Girardot, Medellín
Referee: Jaime Téllez

Cúcuta Deportivo qualified to Champion Playoff on coin toss. Because of this, a Runners-up Playoff was also played after the Champion Playoff.

== Champion playoff ==
19 March 1958

Cúcuta Deportivo	3–4	Independiente Medellín
E. Ramírez 36'; Galeano 67'; Cuéllar 83'	Report	Arredondo 23'; Larraz 40', 51'; Contreras 77'

Estadio General Santander, Cúcuta
Referee: José Sundheim

23 March 1958

Independiente Medellín	4–0	Cúcuta Deportivo
Larraz 10'; Arredondo 40', 62'; Grecco 81'	Report

Estadio Atanasio Girardot, Medellín
Referee: Francisco Giménez Molina

== Runners-up playoff ==
9 April 1958

Cúcuta Deportivo	3–2	Deportes Tolima
E. Ramírez 34'; Galeano 45', 54'	Report	Jamardo 75'; Coll 88'

Estadio General Santander, Cúcuta
Referee: Ovidio Orrego

13 April 1958

Deportes Tolima	2–0	Cúcuta Deportivo
Jamardo 43'; Galavis 66'	Report

Estadio Gustavo Rojas Pinilla, Ibagué
Referee: Francisco Giménez Molina

== Top goalscorers ==
Rank	Name	Club	Goals
1	(Argentina) José Grecco	Independiente Medellín	30
2	(Colombia) Jaime Gutiérrez	Atlético Nacional	23
2	(Argentina) Walter Marcolini	Atlético Quindío	23
2	(Argentina) Roberto Rolando	Boca Juniors de Cali	23
5	(Paraguay) Casimiro Ávalos	Deportivo Pereira	18
5	(Paraguay) Francisco Solano Patiño	Deportivo Pereira	18
7	(Argentina) José Montanini	Atlético Bucaramanga	17
7	(Uruguay) Alberto Galeano	Cúcuta Deportivo	17
9	(Paraguay) Alejandro Genes	Deportivo Pereira	16
10	(Uruguay) Luis Miloc	Cúcuta Deportivo	15

Source: RSSSF.com Colombia 1957
