= Diego Gómez (Colombian footballer) =

Colombian footballer (born 1972)

Personal information
- Full name: Diego Fernando Gómez Hurtado
- Date of birth: March 29, 1972 (age 54)
- Place of birth: Cali, Colombia
- Position: Goalkeeper

Senior career*
Years	Team	Apps	(Gls)
1992–1994	América de Cali	11	(0)
1994–1996	Millonarios FC	0	(0)
1996–1999	América de Cali	107	(0)
2000	Deportivo Pasto	19	(3)
2001	Independiente Medellín	28	(0)
2002	Cortuluá	13	(0)
2003–2004	Deportes Tolima	52	(0)
2005	Deportes Quindío	12	(0)
2005–2006	América de Cali	4	(0)
2006	Deportes Tolima	2	(0)
2007	Deportivo Pasto	1	(0)
2007	América de Cali	13	(0)
2009	América de Cali	0	(0)
Total		262	(3)

International career
2000–2002	Colombia	4	(0)
- * Club domestic league appearances and goals

Diego Gómez is a retired Colombian football goalkeeper.

== Titles ==
Season	Club	Title
1996-97	América de Cali	Categoría Primera A
