= Alicia Perales Ojeda =

- Born: 24 October 1922; Mexico City
- Died: 4 June 1994 (aged 71); Mexico City
- Occupations: Librarian, educator, journalist

Alicia Perales Ojeda (Note: In this Mexican name, the surname is Perales and the second or maternal family name is Ojeda.) (24 October 1922 – 4 June 1994) was a Mexican librarian, the director of services at the Central Library at National Autonomous University of Mexico and a founder of the Information Science College at the School of Philosophy and Letters, UNAM.

== Career ==
Alicia Perales was born in Mexico City. She received her licentiate and doctorate degrees in Hispanism at UNAM, as well as a masters degree in both Education Sciences and Library and Information Science from the University of Kent. She worked as a librarian at the cataloging department of Columbus Memorial Library in Washington, D.C. Dr. Perales also worked as an adjunct professor for José Luis Martínez and Julio Jiménez Rueda.

From 1955 to 1958, Perales was the director of services for the Central Library at UNAM. From 1966 to 1972, she served as the director of the General Council of Libraries at UNAM. After that, she co-founded and directed the Center for Library and Archival Studies at UNAM until 1979. In the 1980s, she worked as an editor and director of the first library science journal at the School of Philosophy and Letters, UNAM, Anuario de Bibliotecología y Archivología.

Perales is the subject of the book Alicia Perales de Mercado: universitaria ejemplar, written by Judith Licea Ayala and published in 2014 by FFyL at UNAM, as a memorial of her impact on the university and the study of library science.
