= 2004 Categoría Primera A season =

Colombian football league season

The 2004 Categoría Primera A season was the 57th season of Colombia's top-flight football league. It began on 1 February and ended on 19 December 2004.

Independiente Medellín won the Campeonato Apertura, and Atlético Junior won the Campeonato Finalizacion.

== Campeonato Apertura ==
The Campeonato Apertura (officially the 2004 Copa Mustang I for sponsorship reasons) was the first tournament of the season. It began on 1 February and ended on 16 May.

=== First stage ===
==== Standings ====
Pos	Team	Pts	GP	W	D	L	GF	GA	GD
1.	América de Cali	37	18	12	1	5	30	17	+13
2.	Deportivo Cali	34	18	10	4	4	23	15	+8
3.	Atlético Nacional	33	18	10	3	5	30	23	+7
4.	Once Caldas	31	18	9	4	5	23	14	+9
5.	Atlético Junior	30	18	8	6	4	26	16	+10
6.	Independiente Medellín	29	18	8	5	5	20	19	+1
7.	Deportivo Pasto	27	18	8	3	7	18	19	-1
8.	Chicó FC	27	18	7	6	5	25	24	+1
9.	Deportes Pereira	26	18	7	5	6	21	18	+3
10.	Millonarios	26	18	7	5	6	23	22	+1
11.	Deportes Tolima	26	18	6	8	4	20	17	+3
12.	Atlético Bucaramanga	21	18	5	6	7	22	25	-3
13.	Independiente Santa Fe	20	18	4	8	6	18	22	-4
14.	Cortuluá	19	18	5	4	9	27	32	-5
15.	Atlético Huila	16	18	4	4	10	19	29	-10
16.	Deportes Quindío	15	18	3	6	9	11	23	-12
17.	Envigado FC	14	18	2	8	8	19	26	-7
18.	Unión Magdalena	10	18	2	4	12	15	29	-14

Pts=Points; GP=Games played; W=Wins; D=Draws; L=Losses; GF=Goals Favored; GA=Goals Allowed; GD=Goal Difference

Qualified for Semifinals
Eliminated

=== Semifinals ===
The second phase of the 2004-I tournament consisted of two groups, each containing 4 teams. This was disputed by the best eight teams from the first phase of the tournament. The winners of each group face in the finals to define a champion.

==== Group A ====
Seed	Pos.	Team	Pts	GP	W	D	L	GF	GA	GD
(3)	1.	Atlético Nacional	10	6	3	1	2	12	8	+4
(7)	2.	Deportivo Pasto	10	6	3	1	2	9	6	+3
(1)	3.	América de Cali	7	6	2	1	3	7	10	-3
(5)	4.	Atlético Junior	6	6	1	3	2	4	8	-4

Fixture 1 - May 19, 2004
Home	Score	Away
América de Cali	1 - 1	Junior
Pasto	2 - 1	Atlético Nacional

Fixture 2 - May 23, 2004
Home	Score	Away
Junior	1 - 1	Pasto
Atlético Nacional	4 - 3	América de Cali

Fixture 3 - June 9, 2004
Home	Score	Away
Pasto	4 - 0	América de Cali
Junior	0 - 4	Atlético Nacional

Fixture 4 - June 13, 2004
Home	Score	Away
Atlético Nacional	1 - 1	Junior
América de Cali	2 - 0	Pasto

Fixture 5 - June 16, 2004
Home	Score	Away
Atlético Nacional	1 - 2	Pasto
Junior	0 - 1	América de Cali

Fixture 6 - June 20, 2004
Home	Score	Away
América de Cali	0 - 1	Atlético Nacional
Pasto	0 - 1	Junior

==== Group B ====
Seed	Pos	Team	Pts	GP	W	D	L	GF	GA	GD
(6)	1.	Independiente Medellín	10	6	3	1	2	15	8	+7
(2)	2.	Once Caldas	9	6	3	0	3	7	11	-4
(8)	3.	Deportivo Cali	8	6	2	2	2	9	11	-2
(4)	4.	Chicó FC	7	6	2	1	3	9	10	-1

Fixture 1 - May 19, 2004
Home	Score	Away
Medellín	4 - 0	Once Caldas
Chico FC	0 - 1	Deportivo Cali

Fixture 2 - May 23, 2004
Home	Score	Away
Deportivo Cali	0 - 3	Medellín
Once Caldas	1 - 0	Chico FC

Fixture 3 - June 5, 2004
Home	Score	Away
Deportivo Cali	3 - 1	Once Caldas
Medellín	1 - 2	Chico FC

Fixture 4 - June 13, 2004
Home	Score	Away
Once Caldas	2 - 0	Cali
Chico FC	3 - 2	Medellín

Fixture 5 - June 16, 2004
Home	Score	Away
Once Caldas	0 - 2	Medellín
Deportivo Cali	2 - 2	Chico FC

Fixture 6 - June 20, 2004
Home	Score	Away
Medellín	3 - 3	Deportivo Cali
Chico FC	2 - 3	Once Caldas

=== Finals ===
Date	City	Home	Score	Away
June 24	Medellín	Independiente Medellín	2 - 1	Atlético Nacional
June 27	Medellín	Atlético Nacional	0 - 0	Independiente Medellín
Independiente Medellín is the champion for winning 2 - 1 on aggregate.

== Campeonato Finalización ==
The Campeonato Finalización (officially the 2004 Copa Mustang II for sponsorship reasons) was the second tournament of the season. It began on 1 August and ended on 19 December.

=== First phase ===
==== Standings ====
Pos	Team	Pts	GP	W	D	L	GF	GA	GD
1.	América de Cali	42	18	13	3	2	32	14	+18
2.	Atlético Bucaramanga	34	18	10	4	4	23	16	+7
3.	Deportes Tolima	33	18	10	3	5	27	20	+7
4.	Deportivo Cali	30	18	9	3	6	24	17	+7
5.	Atlético Nacional	30	18	9	3	6	24	18	+6
6.	Independiente Medellín	29	18	8	5	5	24	13	+9
7.	Once Caldas	28	18	8	4	6	30	19	+11
8.	Atlético Junior	28	18	7	7	4	26	21	+5
9.	Envigado FC	26	18	7	5	6	26	20	+6
10.	Santa Fe	25	18	7	4	7	25	24	+1
11.	Deportes Quindío	25	18	7	4	7	21	29	-8
12.	Tulua	22	18	6	4	8	14	19	-5
13.	Atlético Huila	18	18	5	3	10	21	25	-4
14.	Chicó FC	18	18	4	6	8	15	24	-9
15.	Unión Magdalena	17	18	5	2	11	11	27	-16
16.	Deportivo Pasto	17	18	3	8	7	10	16	-6
17.	Millonarios	13	18	3	4	11	14	29	-15
18.	Deportes Pereira	13	18	3	4	11	9	25	-16

Pts=Points; GP=Games played; W=Wins; D=Draws; L=Losses; GF=Goals Favored; GA=Goals Allowed; GD=Goal Difference

Qualified for Semifinals
Eliminated

=== Semifinals ===
Just like in the Apertura, the second phase of the 2004-II tournament consisted of two groups, each containing 4 teams. This was disputed by the best eight teams from the first phase of the tournament. The winners of each group face in the finals to define a champion.

==== Group A ====
R	Team	Pts	GP	W	D	L	GF	GA	GD
1.	Atlético Nacional	11	6	3	2	1	6	3	+3
2.	América de Cali	8	6	2	2	2	10	8	+2
3.	Deportes Tolima	7	6	2	1	3	9	9	0
4.	Once Caldas	7	6	2	1	3	5	10	-5

==== Group B ====
R	Team	Pts	GP	W	D	L	GF	GA	GD
1.	Atlético Junior	13	6	4	1	1	11	5	+6
2.	Deportivo Cali	8	6	2	2	2	6	6	0
3.	Independiente Medellín	8	6	2	2	2	9	10	-1
4.	Atlético Bucaramanga	4	6	1	1	4	5	10	-5

=== Finals ===
Date	City	Home	Score	Away
December 15	Barranquilla	Atlético Junior	3 - 0	Atlético Nacional
December 19	Medellín	Atlético Nacional	5 - 2	Atlético Junior
Atlético Junior is the champion for winning 4 - 5 on Penalty kicks

== Relegated and promoted team(s) ==
Categories	Relegated team(s)	Promoted team(s)
Primera A Primera B	Cortuluá	Real Cartagena
