= 1981 Campeonato Profesional =

Campeonato Profesional
- Season: 1981
- Champions: Atlético Nacional (4th title)
- Matches: 365
- Goals: 925 (2.53 per match)
- Top goalscorer: Víctor Hugo del Río (29)

The 1981 Campeonato Profesional was the thirty-fourth season of Colombia's top-flight football league. Junior won the league for the fourth time after winning the Cuadrangular final.

== Teams ==
Team	City	Stadium
América	Cali	Olímpico Pascual Guerrero
Atlético Bucaramanga	Bucaramanga	Alfonso López
Atlético Nacional	Medellín	Atanasio Girardot
Cúcuta Deportivo	Cúcuta	General Santander
Deportes Quindío	Armenia	San José de Armenia
Deportes Tolima	Ibagué	Gustavo Rojas Pinilla
Deportivo Cali	Cali	Olímpico Pascual Guerrero
Deportivo Pereira	Pereira	Hernán Ramírez Villegas
Independiente Medellín	Medellín	Atanasio Girardot
Junior	Barranquilla	Romelio Martínez
Millonarios	Bogotá	El Campín
Once Caldas	Manizales	Palogrande
Santa Fe	Bogotá	El Campín
Unión Magdalena	Santa Marta	Eduardo Santos

== Torneo Apertura ==
Pos	Team	P	W	D	L	GF	GA	Pts	Notes
1	América	26	15	8	3	42	21	38	Advance to Group A and Semi-final quadrangulars
2	Millonarios	26	14	7	5	46	28	35	Advance to Group A and Semi-final quadrangulars
3	Atlético Nacional	26	13	7	6	41	32	33	Advance to Group A
4	Deportivo Cali	26	11	7	8	35	22	29	Advance to Group A
5	Deportes Quindío	26	9	9	8	28	29	27	Advance to Group A
6	Unión Magdalena	26	9	9	8	23	28	27	Advance to Group A
7	Cúcuta Deportivo	26	9	7	10	30	36	25	Advance to Group A
8	Deportivo Pereira	26	6	12	8	29	32	24	Advance to Group B
9	Santa Fe	26	6	11	9	36	40	23	Advance to Group B
10	Atlético Bucaramanga	26	7	9	10	29	37	23	Advance to Group B
11	Independiente Medellín	26	7	8	11	26	36	22	Advance to Group B
12	Junior	26	6	9	11	19	26	21	Advance to Group B
13	Once Caldas	26	7	6	13	32	41	20	Advance to Group B
14	Deportes Tolima	26	6	7	13	21	29	19	Advance to Group B

== Torneo Finalización ==
Group A

Pos	Team	P	W	D	L	GF	GA	Pts	Notes
1	Deportes Quindío	21	8	9	6	33	31	25	Advance to Semi-final quadrangulars
2	Deportivo Cali	21	9	5	7	32	26	23	Advance to Semi-final quadrangulars
3	Unión Magdalena	21	9	5	7	24	25	23	
4	Atlético Nacional	21	8	5	8	28	27	21	
5	Cúcuta Deportivo	21	5	11	5	29	33	21	
6	Millonarios	21	5	9	7	20	25	19	
7	América	21	8	2	11	31	30	18	

Group B

Pos	Team	P	W	D	L	GF	GA	Pts	Notes
1	Deportes Tolima	21	10	7	4	29	20	27	Advance to Semi-final quadrangulars
2	Junior	21	8	8	5	34	29	24	Advance to Semi-final quadrangulars
3	Once Caldas	21	8	5	8	32	32	21	
4	Atlético Bucaramanga	21	7	6	8	23	25	20	
5	Santa Fe	21	6	6	9	31	33	18	
6	Independiente Medellín	21	6	6	9	25	29	18	
7	Deportivo Pereira	21	4	8	9	26	32	16	

== Aggregate table ==
The overall standings combining results from both the Torneo Apertura and Torneo Finalización determined the remaining qualifiers for the semi-final quadrangulars.

Pos	Team	P	W	D	L	GF	GA	GD	Pts	Notes
1	América de Cali	47	23	10	14	73	51	+22	56	Qualified via Apertura
2	Atlético Nacional	47	21	12	14	69	59	+10	54	Qualified via Aggregate table
3	Millonarios	47	19	16	12	66	53	+13	54	Qualified via Apertura
4	Deportivo Cali	47	20	12	15	67	48	+19	52	Qualified via Finalización
5	Deportes Quindío	47	17	18	12	61	60	+1	52	Qualified via Finalización
6	Unión Magdalena	47	18	14	15	47	54	−7	50	Qualified via Aggregate table
7	Deportes Tolima	47	16	14	17	42	49	−7	46	Qualified via Finalización
8	Cúcuta Deportivo	47	14	18	15	59	69	−10	46	Advance to Copa Colombia
9	Junior	47	14	17	16	53	55	−2	45	Qualified via Finalización
10	Atlético Bucaramanga	47	14	15	18	52	62	−10	43	Advance to Copa Colombia
11	Once Caldas	47	15	11	21	63	73	−10	41	Advance to Copa Colombia
12	Santa Fe	47	12	17	18	67	73	−6	41	Advance to Copa Colombia
13	Deportivo Pereira	47	10	20	17	55	64	−9	40	Advance to Copa Colombia
14	Independiente Medellín	47	12	14	21	50	66	−16	38	Advance to Copa Colombia

== Semi-final quadrangulars ==
Group A

Pos	Team	P	W	D	L	GF	GA	Pts	Notes
1	América	6	4	1	1	12	1	9	Advance to Final quadrangular
2	Junior	6	4	1	1	11	9	9	Advance to Final quadrangular
3	Millonarios	6	1	1	4	5	12	3	Advance to Copa Colombia
4	Unión Magdalena	6	1	1	4	3	9	3	Advance to Copa Colombia

Group B

Pos	Team	P	W	D	L	GF	GA	Pts	Notes
1	Deportes Tolima	6	2	4	0	6	4	8	Advance to Final quadrangular
2	Atlético Nacional	6	2	3	1	8	4	7	Advance to Final quadrangular
3	Deportivo Cali	6	2	2	2	10	9	6	Advance to Copa Colombia
4	Deportes Quindío	6	0	3	3	3	10	3	Advance to Copa Colombia

== Copa Colombia ==
The Copa Colombia was played as an additional part of the league championship. Draws were decided by penalty shoot-out, with winners obtaining 2 points and losers none.

=== First stage ===
The six clubs that had not qualified for the Cuadrangulares played a round-robin tournament. Independiente Medellín advanced to the final as winners.

- Atlético Bucaramanga
- Cúcuta Deportivo
- Independiente Medellín
- Once Caldas
- Deportivo Pereira
- Santa Fe

=== Second stage ===
The four clubs eliminated in the Cuadrangulares played a round-robin tournament. Deportivo Cali advanced to the final as winners.

- Deportivo Cali
- Millonarios
- Deportes Quindío
- Unión Magdalena

=== Final ===
Team 1	1st leg	2nd leg	Team 2
Independiente Medellín	3–1	1–1	Deportivo Cali

== Final quadrangular ==
Pos	Team	P	W	D	L	GF	GA	Pts	Notes
1	Atlético Nacional	6	3	2	1	7	6	8	Qualified for 1982 Copa Libertadores
2	Deportes Tolima	6	2	2	2	10	9	6	Qualified for 1982 Copa Libertadores
3	América	6	1	3	2	6	8	5	
4	Junior	6	1	3	2	10	10	5	
