= Enrique Perales =

Peruvian footballer (1914–2002)

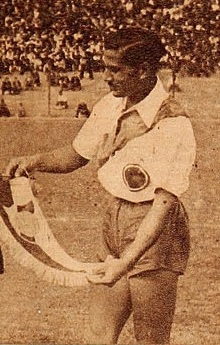

Personal information
- Full name: Enrique Perales del Río
- Date of birth: 18 January 1914
- Place of birth: Ica, Peru
- Date of death: 27 October 2002 (aged 88)
- Place of death: Lima, Peru
- Position: Defender

Youth career
- Sport Victoria

Senior career*
Years	Team	Apps	(Gls)
1938–1940	Universitario		
1941–1948	Deportivo Municipal		
1948	C.D. Oro		
1949–1951	Independiente Medellín		

International career
1939–1947	Peru	17	(0)
Medal record
Men's football
Representing Peru
Copa América
Winner	1939 Lima
- * Club domestic league appearances and goals

Enrique Perales del Río (Ica, 18 January 1914 – Lima, 27 October 2002) was a Peruvian professional footballer who played as defender.

== Club career ==
Trained at Sport Victoria in his hometown of Ica, Enrique Perales began his career at Universitario de Deportes in 1938 and won the Peruvian championship with the club in 1939. In 1941, he joined Deportivo Municipal and became a key player. With this club, he won the Peruvian championship in 1943. Interestingly, he played for Deportivo Municipal alongside his two brothers, Agapito and Constantino Perales.

Enrique Perales then went abroad, first to Mexico where he played for C.D. Oro in 1948, before signing in 1949 with Independiente Medellín in Colombia. The team had a large contingent of Peruvian players, nicknamed La Danza del Sol (The Dance of the Sun).

== International career ==
A Peruvian international 17 times between 1939 and 1947 (no goals scored), Enrique Perales was part of the Peruvian team that won the South American championship in 1939. He would have the opportunity to participate in three more South American championships in the 1940s (1941, 1942 and 1947).

== Honours ==
Universitario de Deportes

- Peruvian Primera División: 1939

Deportivo Municipal

- Peruvian Primera División: 1943

Peru

- South American Championship: 1939
