= 1955 Campeonato Profesional =

Eighth season of Colombia's top-flight football league

Campeonato Profesional
- Season: 1955
- Champions: Independiente Medellín (1st title)
- Matches: 135
- Goals: 507 (3.76 per match)
- Top goalscorer: Felipe Marino (22)
- Biggest home win: Atlético Nacional 7–0 Cúcuta Deportivo
- Biggest away win: Deportivo Cali 0–4 Boca Juniors; Deportivo Cali 0–4 Atlético Quindío; Cúcuta Deportivo 0–4 Medellín; Deportes Tolima 0–4 Millonarios
- Highest scoring: Atlético Nacional 5–4 Atlético Quindío

The 1955 Campeonato Profesional was the eighth season of Colombia's top-flight football league. 10 teams compete against one another and played each weekend. Independiente Medellín won the league for 1st time in its history after getting 44 points. Atlético Nacional, the defending champion, was 2nd with 39 points.

== Background ==
10 teams competed in the tournament: Atlético Manizales was dissolved and Unión Magdalena was penalized for withdrawing the previous championship, while Cúcuta Deportivo return to the tournament and Deportes Tolima debuted. Independiente Medellín won the championship for first time.

== League system ==
Every team played three games against each other team, one at home, one away and the other one at the stadium of the team that was economically worse. Teams received two points for a win and one point for a draw. If two or more teams were tied on points, places were determined by goal difference. The team with the most points is the champion of the league.

== Teams ==
Locations of the 1955 Campeonato Profesional teams:
- 1. Armenia
- 2. Bogotá
- 3. Cali
- 4. Cúcuta
- 5. Ibagué
- 6. Medellín

Team	City	Stadium
América	Cali	Estadio Olímpico Pascual Guerrero
Atlético Nacional	Medellín	Estadio Atanasio Girardot
Atlético Quindío	Armenia	Estadio San José de Armenia
Boca Juniors	Cali	Estadio Olímpico Pascual Guerrero
Cúcuta Deportivo	Cúcuta	Estadio General Santander
Deportes Tolima	Ibagué	Estadio Gustavo Rojas Pinilla
Deportivo Cali	Cali	Estadio Olímpico Pascual Guerrero
Independiente Medellín	Medellín	Estadio Atanasio Girardot
Millonarios	Bogotá	Estadio El Campín
Santa Fe	Bogotá	Estadio El Campín

== Final standings ==
Pos	Team	Pld	W	D	L	GF	GA	GD	Pts
1	Independiente Medellín (C)	18	14	3	1	58	26	+32	31
2	Atlético Nacional	18	11	3	4	56	27	+29	25
3	Quindío	18	11	2	5	48	24	+24	24
4	Millonarios	18	8	4	6	31	34	−3	20
5	Boca Juniors	17	7	4	6	31	28	+3	18
6	América	16	6	3	7	32	32	0	15
7	Deportes Tolima	18	4	7	7	33	47	−14	15
8	Cúcuta Deportivo	17	5	2	10	20	36	−16	12
9	Santa Fe	17	2	3	12	24	44	−20	7
10	Deportivo Cali	15	1	3	11	16	51	−35	5

Source: RSSSF
(C) Champions

=== Results ===
Home \ Away	AME	BJ	CAL	CUC	MED	MIL	NAC	QUI	SFE	TOL
América		3–3	3–1	6–1	1–0	1–1	0–1	1–3	5–2	3–3
América		2–2	3–0		0–2		0–2		1–1	
Boca Juniors	0–1		0–0	2–0	1–2	0–2	0–1	1–1	2–0	4–1
Boca Juniors			3–0				1–3			
Deportivo Cali	4–2	0–4		2–4	1–3	4–2	0–2	0–4	0–2	1–2
Deportivo Cali				1–3						
Cúcuta Deportivo	3–1	2–4	2–2		0–4	2–2	3–1	1–3	3–0	2–1
Cúcuta Deportivo	1–2	2–1			1–3	2–2	0–3			5–1
Medellín	5–2	0–1	3–2	3–2		6–1	2–1	4–2	3–0	5–1
Medellín		4–0	7–1			2–1			2–0	
Millonarios	3–1	1–2	0–0	6–2	0–1		1–2	2–1	2–2	6–2
Millonarios	1–1	3–1	2–0					1–2	2–0	
Atlético Nacional	1–0	2–2	5–1	7–0	1–2	3–3		5–4	2–1	2–2
Atlético Nacional			3–2		1–0	2–2		2–1		6–2
Atlético Quindío	1–0	4–1	6–2	1–1	2–2	2–2	2–2		3–1	3–0
Atlético Quindío	1–1	3–0	3–2	2–1	0–0				5–0	
Santa Fe	2–1	2–4	1–1	4–3	0–2	2–2	2–2	1–3		0–0
Santa Fe		1–1	2–3	4–1			2–1			
Deportes Tolima	2–3	2–3	4–0	3–0	0–2	0–4	0–0	2–3	3–0	
Deportes Tolima	4–1	1–2	4–4		2–0	2–4		2–1	1–1	

Legend: Blue = home team win; Yellow = draw; Red = away team win.

=== Top goalscorers ===
Rank	Name	Club	Goals
1	(Argentina) Felipe Marino	Independiente Medellín	22
2	(Colombia) Jorge Roa	Millonarios	21
3	(Colombia) Fernando Rengifo	Boca Juniors	20
4	(Argentina) Alfredo Castillo	Millonarios	17
5	(Colombia) Humberto Álvarez	Atlético Nacional	16
6	(Argentina) Orlando Larraz	Independiente Medellín	14
7	(Uruguay) Juan Carlos Toja	Atlético Nacional	13
7	(Paraguay) Casimiro Ávalos	Deportes Tolima	13
9	(Paraguay) Alejandrino Genes	Atlético Quindío	12
9	(Argentina) Roberto Urruti	Atlético Quindío	12

Source: RSSSF.com Colombia 1955
