= Jaime Perales Contreras =

Mexican scholar (born 1963)

- Born: 15 July 1963 (age 63); Mexico City
- Education: ITAM; Georgetown University
- Writing career
- Language: Spanish
- Subjects: Modern Literature, Politics and Cinema.
- Notable awards: Fulbright Program(1992)

Jaime Perales Contreras (Note: In this Mexican name, the surname is Perales and the second or maternal family name is Contreras.) (born 15 July 1963) is a Mexican cultural critic, public commentator and scholar. He wrote the first full-fledged biography on Nobel Award Winner for Literature Octavio Paz. (Octavio Paz y su círculo intellectual (2013), finalist XX Comillas Award for Biography and History, Barcelona, Spain.

Nobel Laureate Mario Vargas Llosa praised Perales's book: "a mandatory reading for understanding the politics and culture of the last twenty years in the Americas of the twentieth century".

== Biography ==
Born in Mexico City, Perales Contreras earned his PhD in literature and cultural studies from Georgetown University, and a master's degree in International Relations from the Edmund Walsh School of Foreign Service at Georgetown University. He did his undergraduate studies in social sciences at ITAM . His previous work on Paz influenced quite a few studies on the poet's work. He worked for 12 years at the Organization of American States in the fields of Democracy and Humanitarian Security. He collaborated with different publications in Mexico, the United States and Brazil. As lecturer, he taught at the Foreign Service Institute (FSI), the school for U.S. diplomatic personnel based in Rosslyn V.A, at Georgetown University in Washington D.C., and ITAM in Mexico City. He was a recipient of the Fulbright Program, The British Council Award Scholarship and the Consejo Nacional de Ciencia y Tecnología CONACYT
