= 1981 Campeonato Ecuatoriano de Fútbol Serie A =

Campeonato Ecuatoriano de Fútbol
- Season: 1981
- Champions: Barcelona
- Relegated: América de Quito; Deportivo Cuenca; LDU Portoviejo; Técnico Universitario
- Copa Libertadores: Barcelona; LDU Quito

The 1981 Campeonato Ecuatoriano de Fútbol de la Serie A was the 23rd national championship for football teams in Ecuador.

== Teams ==
The number of teams for this season was 12 teams. Deportivo Quito and LDU Cuenca promoted as winners of First Stage of Serie B.

Club	City
9 de Octubre	Guayaquil
América de Quito	Quito
Barcelona	Guayaquil
Deportivo Cuenca	Cuenca
Deportivo Quito	Quito
El Nacional	Quito
Emelec	Guayaquil
Everest	Guayaquil
LDU Portoviejo	Portoviejo
LDU Quito	Quito
Técnico Universitario	Ambato
Universidad Católica	Quito

== First stage ==
Pos	Team	Pld	W	D	L	GF	GA	GD	Pts	Qualification or relegation
1	Barcelona	18	11	3	4	29	14	+15	25	Qualified to the Liguilla Final
2	LDU Quito	18	10	5	3	27	18	+9	25	Qualified to the Liguilla Final
3	El Nacional	18	7	6	5	17	16	+1	20	Qualified to the Liguilla Final
4	Universidad Católica	18	6	6	6	26	21	+5	18	
5	Deportivo Cuenca	18	5	6	7	15	19	−4	16	
6	América de Quito	18	6	4	8	21	27	−6	16	
7	Everest	18	7	2	9	27	33	−6	16	
8	Deportivo Quito	18	6	4	8	17	24	−7	16	
9	Técnico Universitario	18	6	2	10	19	22	−3	14	Relegated to the Serie B
10	LDU Portoviejo	18	5	4	9	26	30	−4	14	Relegated to the Serie B

Source: RSSSF - 1981 Serie A

== Second stage ==
Pos	Team	Pld	W	D	L	GF	GA	GD	Pts	Qualification or relegation
1	Barcelona	18	8	5	5	32	23	+9	21	Qualified to the Liguilla Final
2	LDU Quito	18	8	4	6	28	20	+8	20	Qualified to the Liguilla Final
3	El Nacional	18	6	6	6	24	18	+6	18	Qualified to the Liguilla Final
4	9 de Octubre	18	7	4	7	24	22	+2	18	
5	Universidad Católica	18	7	4	7	22	20	+2	18	
6	Everest	18	5	8	5	25	33	−8	18	
7	Deportivo Quito	18	7	3	8	28	28	0	17	
8	Emelec	18	6	5	7	29	33	−4	17	
9	Deportivo Cuenca	18	7	3	8	23	35	−12	17	Relegated to the Serie B
10	América de Quito	18	4	8	6	18	21	−3	16	Relegated to the Serie B

Source: RSSSF - 1981 Serie A

== Triangular Final ==
Pos	Team	Pld	W	D	L	GF	GA	GD	Pts	Qualification
1	Barcelona (Note: Barcelona were awarded six points.) (C)	4	2	0	2	6	6	0	10	1982 Copa Libertadores
2	El Nacional (Note: El Nacional were awarded two points.)	4	2	1	1	9	6	+3	7	
3	LDU Quito (Note: LDU Quito were awarded four points.)	4	1	1	2	8	11	−3	7	1982 Copa Libertadores

Source: RSSSF - 1981 Serie A
(C) Champions

=== Second-place play-offs ===
El Nacional	2–2	LDU Quito

LDU Quito	2–1	El Nacional

Campeonato Ecuatoriano de Fútbol
1981 champion
