= School of Philosophy and Letters, UNAM =

Coordinates: 19.33467°N 99.18694°W

Facultad de Filosofía y Letras (School of Philosophy and Literature) (UNAM)
- Seal of the UNAM's School of Philosophy and Literature
- Type: Faculty
- Established: 1910; 116 years ago
- President: Mary Frances Teresa Rodriguez Van Gort, PhD.
- Location: Mexico City, Mexico
- Colors: Black & Red
- Website: www.filos.unam.mx

The Facultad de Filosofía y Letras (School of Philosophy and Literature) or FFyL of the National Autonomous University of Mexico (UNAM) administers eleven divisions of the humanities offering undergraduate and graduate degrees. The Department is one of the largest, and most renowned, literature faculties in the Spanish-speaking world; the Alma Mater of Nobel Prize laureate Octavio Paz and a number of other important figures in Latin American literature.

== History ==
The direct ancestor of Department was the High Studies National School, founded in 1910 by Justo Sierra as an attempt to establish graduate level degrees and research. The School itself was created fourteen year later hosting four majors: Sciences, Philosophy, Literature, and Historic Sciences. The Department has always been one of the most dynamic schools at the university, adding additional majors along with separating Sciences programs into a new department.

== Organization ==
The School is run by the Dean, currently Jorge Enrique Linares Salgado, PhD., and is divided into eleven divisions offering undergraduate and graduate degrees:

- History
- Classic Philology
- Pedagogy (Education)
- Latin American Studies
- Hispanic Philology
- Philosophy
- Geography
- Theater and Dramatic Literature
- Modern Literature (Italian, German, French, Portuguese, and English)
- Library Science
- Intercultural Development and Management

== Location and facilities ==
The School is located in Ciudad Universitaria in Mexico City, housed in one main complex near the Law School and the Main Library. Department faculty conduct joint research projects with the Instituto de Investigaciones Estéticas (IIE) and the Instituto de Investigaciones Filológicas (IIF). Recently there has also been collaborations with the School of Engineering to develop Media, Arts, and Technology projects.

== Graduate programs ==
Graduate programs are offered in each division, and co-sponsor educational and research programs with other faculties at institutes all over the country.

== Famous alumni ==
Well-known figures of Mexican and Spanish language literature, culture, and philosophy who have either graduated from the Department, or worked therein:

- Emilio Carballido
- Rosario Castellanos
- Germán Dehesa
- Fernando del Paso
- Elena Garro
- Alberto Gironella
- Margo Glantz
- Jorge Ibargüengoitia
- Carlos Monsiváis
- Thelma Nava
- Octavio Paz
- Alicia Perales Ojeda
- Jaime Sabines
- Adolfo Sánchez Vázquez
- Luis Villoro
- Ramón Xirau
- Hector Zagal
