= 1981 Argentine Primera División =

90th season of top-tier football league in Argentina

Primera División
- Season: 1981
- Dates: 22 February – 20 December
- Champions: Boca Juniors (Metropolitano); River Plate (Nacional)
- 1982 Copa Libertadores: Boca Juniors; River Plate

The 1981 Primera División season was the 90th season of top-flight football in Argentina. Boca Juniors won the Metropolitano (20th title) while River Plate (21st title) won the Nacional championship. League is Superliga Argentina.

Colón and San Lorenzo were relegated.

== Metropolitano championship ==
Metropolitano
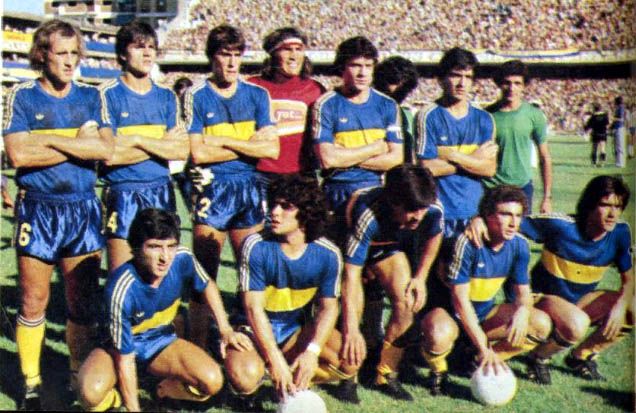
- Boca Juniors, Metropolitano champions
- Season: 1981
- Dates: 22 February – 15 August
- Champions: Boca Juniors (20th title)
- Promoted: Instituto (C); Sarmiento (J)
- Relegated: Colón; San Lorenzo
- 1982 Copa Libertadores: Boca Juniors
- Top goalscorer: (Argentina) Raúl Chaparro (20)

Pos	Team	Pld	W	D	L	GF	GA	GD	Pts
1	Boca Juniors	34	20	10	4	60	27	+33	50
2	Ferro Carril Oeste	34	18	13	3	50	20	+30	49
3	Newell's Old Boys	34	14	11	9	58	44	+14	39
3	River Plate	34	14	11	9	62	50	+12	39
5	Racing	34	12	14	8	46	30	+16	38
6	Independiente	34	14	9	11	43	35	+8	37
7	Rosario Central	34	9	16	9	36	39	−3	34
8	Huracán	34	12	9	13	41	50	−9	33
9	Instituto	34	13	6	15	56	54	+2	32
9	Unión	34	11	10	13	39	37	+2	32
11	Vélez Sársfield	34	8	15	11	39	48	−9	31
11	Platense	34	10	11	13	39	49	−10	31
13	Sarmiento	34	9	12	13	46	52	−6	30
13	Estudiantes (LP)	34	11	8	15	35	43	−8	30
15	Talleres (C)	34	10	9	15	36	45	−9	29
15	Argentinos Juniors	34	9	11	14	44	57	−13	29
17	San Lorenzo	34	9	10	15	31	48	−17	28
18	Colón	34	6	9	19	26	59	−33	21

== Nacional championship ==
Nacional
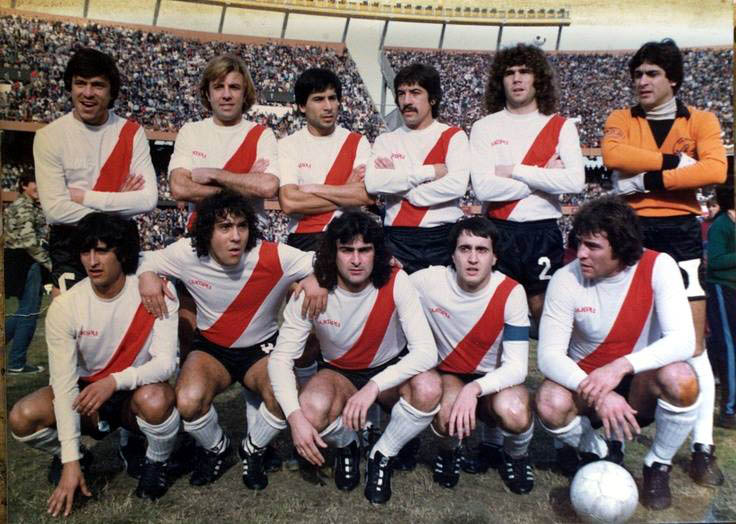
- River Plate, Nacional champions
- Season: 1981
- Dates: 13 September – 20 December
- Champions: River Plate (21st title)
- 1982 Copa Libertadores: River Plate
- Top goalscorer: (Argentina) Carlos Bianchi (15 goals)

=== Group A ===
Pos	Team	Pld	W	D	L	GF	GA	GD	Pts
1	Rosario Central	14	7	4	3	32	20	+12	18
2	Gimnasia y Esgrima (J)	14	6	4	4	19	16	+3	16
3	Argentinos Juniors	14	4	7	3	15	15	0	15
4	Huracán	14	5	4	5	20	20	0	14
4	Belgrano	14	5	4	5	16	16	0	14
4	Gimnasia y Esgrima (M)	14	4	6	4	15	16	−1	14
7	Racing	14	2	6	6	12	22	−10	10

=== Group B ===
Pos	Team	Pld	W	D	L	GF	GA	GD	Pts
1	Ferro Carril Oeste	14	10	2	2	24	11	+13	22
2	River Plate	14	7	5	2	26	12	+14	19
2	Loma Negra	14	7	5	2	15	10	+5	19
4	Talleres (C)	14	2	6	6	9	16	−7	10
4	Guaraní Antonio Franco	14	3	4	7	16	24	−8	10
6	San Martín (T)	14	3	3	8	17	24	−7	9
6	Sarmiento	14	3	3	8	10	20	−10	9

=== Group C ===
Pos	Team	Pld	W	D	L	GF	GA	GD	Pts
1	Independiente	14	9	3	2	29	10	+19	21
2	Vélez Sársfield	14	8	1	5	26	14	+12	17
3	Racing (C)	14	8	3	3	27	16	+11	19
4	Newell's Old Boys	14	4	4	6	23	24	−1	12
4	Platense	14	3	6	5	7	15	−8	12
6	Gimnasia y Tiro	14	1	5	8	9	26	−17	7
6	Huracán (SR)	14	1	5	8	14	34	−20	7

=== Group D ===
Pos	Team	Pld	W	D	L	GF	GA	GD	Pts
1	Boca Juniors	14	8	3	3	28	12	+16	19
2	Instituto	14	6	4	4	18	14	+4	16
2	Estudiantes (LP)	14	5	6	3	16	13	+3	16
4	San Lorenzo	14	4	6	4	14	15	−1	14
4	Atlético Tucumán	14	6	2	6	14	17	−3	14
6	Unión	14	2	6	6	13	15	−2	10
7	San Lorenzo	14	3	3	8	13	30	−17	9

=== Quarterfinals ===
Team 1	Agg.	Team 2	1st leg	2nd leg
Rosario Central	1–2	River Plate	1–2	0–0
Ferro Carril Oeste	2–0	Gimnasia y Esgrima (J)	1–0	1–0
Instituto	1–2	Independiente	1–2	0–0
Boca Juniors	3–4	Vélez Sársfield	2–1	1–3

=== Semifinals ===
Team 1	Agg.	Team 2	1st leg	2nd leg
Independiente	1–1 (a)	River Plate	1–1	0–0
Vélez Sársfield	2–3	Ferro Carril Oeste	1–2	1–1

=== Finals ===
Team 1	Agg.	Team 2	1st leg	2nd leg
River Plate	2–0	Ferro Carril Oeste	1–0	1–0
