= 1982 Copa Libertadores =

23rd season of Copa Libertadores

1982 Copa Libertadores de América
Tournament details
- Dates: March 7 – November 30
- Teams: 21 (from 10 associations)

Final positions
- Champions: (Uruguay) Peñarol (4th title)
- Runners-up: (Chile) Cobreloa

Tournament statistics
- Matches played: 74
- Goals scored: 163 (2.2 per match)

The Copa Libertadores 1982 was the 23rd edition of the Copa Libertadores, CONMEBOL's annual international club tournament. Peñarol won the competition.

== Qualified teams ==
Country	Team	Qualify method
CONMEBOL (1 berth)	Flamengo	1981 Copa Libertadores champion
Argentina; 2 berths	River Plate	1981 Campeonato Nacional champions
Argentina; 2 berths	Boca Juniors	1981 Campeonato Metropolitano champions
Bolivia; 2 berths	Jorge Wilstermann	1981 Primera División champion
Bolivia; 2 berths	The Strongest	1981 Primera División runner-up
Brazil; 2 berths	Grêmio	1981 Campeonato Brasileiro Série A champion
Brazil; 2 berths	São Paulo	1981 Campeonato Brasileiro Série A 2nd place
Chile; 2 berths	Colo-Colo	1981 Primera División champion
Chile; 2 berths	Cobreloa	1981 Liguilla Pre-Copa Libertadores winner
Colombia; 2 berths	Atlético Nacional	1981 Campeonato Profesional champion
Colombia; 2 berths	Deportes Tolima	1981 Campeonato Profesional runner-up
Ecuador; 2 berths	Barcelona	1981 Campeonato Ecuatoriano de Fútbol Serie A champion
Ecuador; 2 berths	LDU Quito	1981 Campeonato Ecuatoriano de Fútbol Serie A runner-up
Paraguay; 2 berths	Olimpia	1981 Primera División champion
Paraguay; 2 berths	Sol de América	1981 Primera División runner-up
Peru; 2 berths	Melgar	1981 Torneo Descentralizado champion
Peru; 2 berths	Deportivo Municipal	1981 Torneo Descentralizado runner-up
Uruguay; 2 berths	Defensor Sporting	1981 Liguilla Pre-Libertadores winner
Uruguay; 2 berths	Peñarol	1981 Liguilla Pre-Libertadores runner-up
Venezuela; 2 berths	Deportivo Táchira	1981 Primera División champion
Venezuela; 2 berths	Estudiantes de Mérida	1981 Primera División runner-up

== Draw ==
The champions and runners-up of each football association were drawn into the same group along with another football association's participating teams. Three clubs from Brazil competed as Flamengo was champion of the 1981 Copa Libertadores. They entered the tournament in the Semifinals.

Group 1	Group 2	Group 3	Group 4	Group 5
Argentina; Bolivia	Brazil; Uruguay	Colombia; Venezuela	Chile; Ecuador	Paraguay; Peru

== Group stage ==
=== Group 1 ===
Group 1 standings
Pos	Team	Pld	W	D	L	GF	GA	GD	Pts	Qualification	(Argentina) RIV	(Bolivia) STR	(Bolivia) WIL	(Argentina) BOC
1	(Argentina) River Plate	6	5	1	0	9	2	+7	11	Qualified to the Semi-Finals	—	4–1	3–0	1–0
2	(Bolivia) The Strongest	6	2	1	3	6	7	−1	5		1–0	—	1–1	1–0
3	(Bolivia) Jorge Wilstermann	6	1	2	3	3	5	−2	4		0–1	1–2	—	1–0
4	(Argentina) Boca Juniors	6	1	2	3	5	9	−4	4		0–0	1–0	2–2	—

=== Group 2 ===
Group 2 standings
Pos	Team	Pld	W	D	L	GF	GA	GD	Pts	Qualification	(Uruguay) PEÑ	(Brazil) SAO	(Brazil) GRE	(Uruguay) DFS
1	(Uruguay) Peñarol	6	4	1	1	7	3	+4	9	Qualified to the Semi-Finals	—	1–0	1–0	3–0
2	(Brazil) São Paulo	6	2	2	2	7	6	+1	6		0–1	—	2–2	2–1
3	(Brazil) Grêmio	6	1	3	2	6	6	0	5		3–1	0–0	—	1–2
4	(Uruguay) Defensor Sporting	6	1	2	3	4	9	−5	4		0–0	1–3	0–0	—

=== Group 3 ===
Group 3 standings
Pos	Team	Pld	W	D	L	GF	GA	GD	Pts	Qualification	(Colombia) TOL	(Colombia) NAC	(Venezuela) ESM	(Venezuela) TAC
1	(Colombia) Deportes Tolima	6	3	3	0	9	3	+6	9	Qualified to the Semi-Finals	—	0–0	1–0	2–2
2	(Colombia) Atlético Nacional	6	3	2	1	6	4	+2	8		0–3	—	2–0	1–0
3	(Venezuela) Estudiantes de Mérida	6	1	2	3	3	7	−4	4		1–1	1–3	—	1–0
4	(Venezuela) Deportivo Táchira	6	0	3	3	2	6	−4	3		0–2	0–0	0–0	—

=== Group 4 ===
Group 4 standings
Pos	Team	Pld	W	D	L	GF	GA	GD	Pts	Qualification	(Chile) COB	(Chile) CC	(Ecuador) LDQ	(Ecuador) BSC
1	(Chile) Cobreloa	6	3	3	0	9	2	+7	9	Qualified to the Semi-Finals	—	2–0	3–1	3–0
2	(Chile) Colo-Colo	6	3	2	1	8	5	+3	8		0–0	—	1–0	2–0
3	(Ecuador) LDU Quito	6	1	2	3	8	12	−4	4		0–0	2–2	—	4–2
4	(Ecuador) Barcelona	6	1	1	4	8	14	−6	3		1–1	1–3	4–1	—

=== Group 5 ===
Group 5 standings
Pos	Team	Pld	W	D	L	GF	GA	GD	Pts	Qualification	(Paraguay) OLI	(Peru) MEL	(Paraguay) SOL	(Peru) MUN
1	(Paraguay) Olimpia	6	4	2	0	12	3	+9	10	Qualified to the Semi-Finals	—	4–0	1–1	1–0
2	(Peru) Melgar	6	4	0	2	9	10	−1	8		0–3	—	3–2	2–1
3	(Paraguay) Sol de América	6	2	2	2	9	8	+1	6		1–1	0–2	—	2–1
4	(Peru) Deportivo Municipal	6	0	0	6	3	12	−9	0		1–2	0–2	0–3	—

== Semifinals ==
=== Group 1 ===
Pos	Team	Pld	W	D	L	GF	GA	GD	Pts	Qualification	(Uruguay) PEÑ	(Brazil) FLA	(Argentina) RIV
1	(Uruguay) Peñarol	4	4	0	0	8	3	+5	8	Qualified to the Final	—	1–0	2–1
2	(Brazil) Flamengo	4	2	0	2	7	4	+3	4		0–1	—	4–2
3	(Argentina) River Plate	4	0	0	4	5	13	−8	0		2–4	0–3	—

=== Group 2 ===
Pos	Team	Pld	W	D	L	GF	GA	GD	Pts	Qualification	(Chile) COB	(Paraguay) OLI	(Colombia) TOL
1	(Chile) Cobreloa	4	2	1	1	5	2	+3	5	Qualified to the Final	—	1–0	3–0
2	(Paraguay) Olimpia	4	1	2	1	4	3	+1	4		1–1	—	2–0
3	(Colombia) Deportes Tolima	4	1	1	2	2	6	−4	3		1–0	1–1	—

== Finals ==
Team 1	Agg.	Team 2	1st leg	2nd leg
Peñarol (Uruguay)	1 – 0	(Chile) Cobreloa	0 – 0	1 – 0

Copa Libertadores
1982 winner

Peñarol
4th title
