= Julio Ortellado =

Paraguayan footballer (born 1978)

Personal information
- Full name: Júlio César Ortellado Melgarejo
- Date of birth: 24 May 1978 (age 48)
- Place of birth: Mariano Roque Alonso, Paraguay
- Height: 1.83 m (6 ft 0 in)
- Position: Forward

Senior career*
Years	Team	Apps	(Gls)
2000	Deportes Antofagasta		
2001	Rangers de Talca		
2002	Deportivo Recoleta		
2003–2005	Tacuary		
2005–2006	Libertad		
2006	Sportivo Luqueño		
2007	Libertad		
2008–2009	Club Nacional		
2009	Sportivo Luqueño		
2010	Tacuary		
2010	Deportes Tolima		
2011	General Caballero		
2012	Sarmiento		
- * Club domestic league appearances and goals

Julio César Ortellado (born 24 May 1978 in Mariano Roque Alonso, Paraguay) is a Paraguayan former professional footballer who played as a forward.
