= Deportes Tolima =

Association football club in Colombia

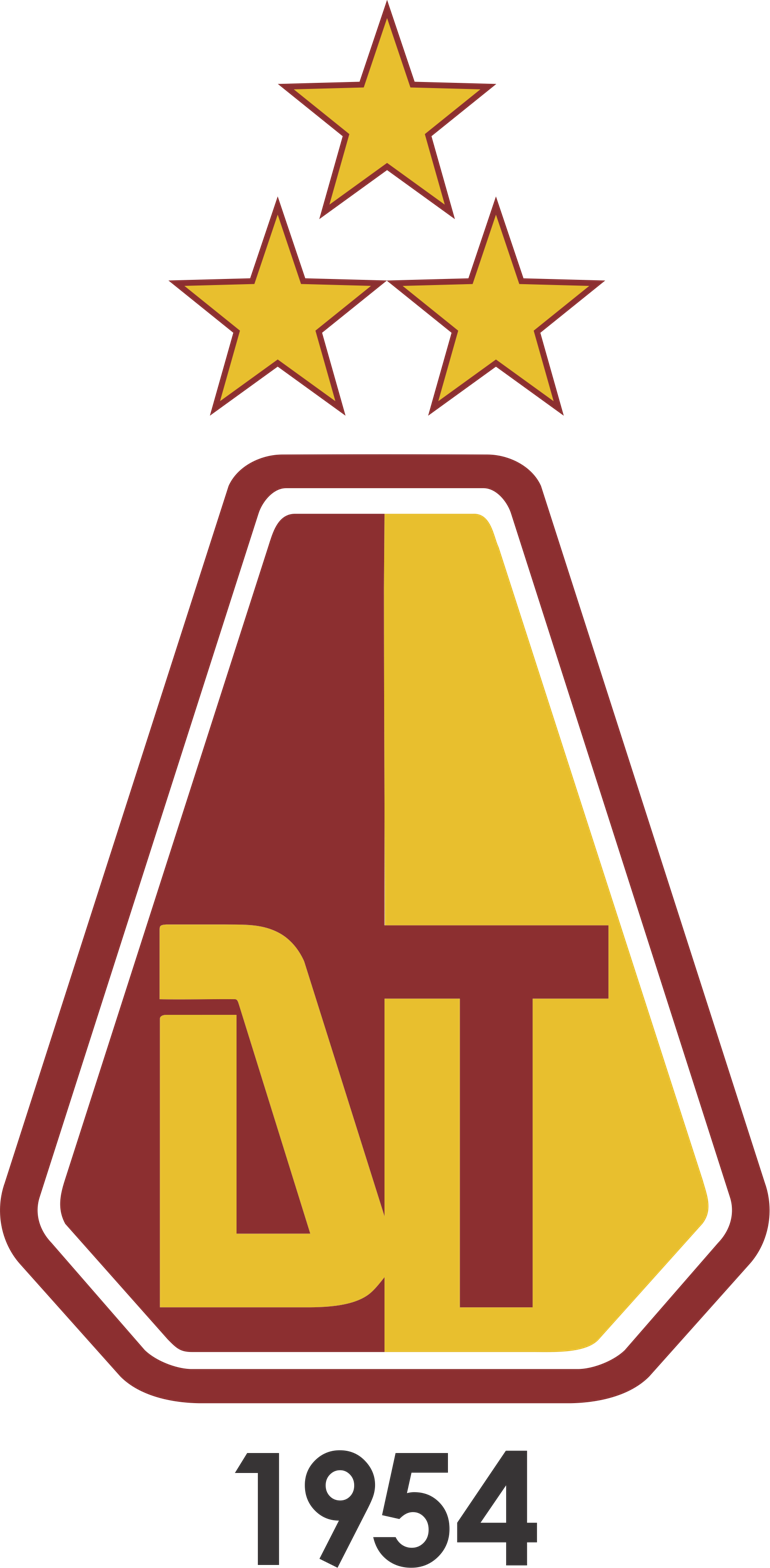
- Full name: Club Deportes Tolima S.A.
- Nicknames: El Vinotinto y Oro (The Burgundy and Gold); Los Pijaos (The Pijaos)
- Founded: 18 December 1954; 71 years ago
- Ground: Manuel Murillo Toro
- Capacity: 28,100
- Owner: Leonor Serrano
- President: César Camargo
- Head coach: Luis Fernando Suárez
- League: Categoría Primera A
- 2025: Primera A, 1st of 20
- Website: clubdeportestolima.com.co
Home colours	Away colours	Third colours

Club Deportes Tolima S.A., commonly known as Deportes Tolima, or simply as Tolima, is a Colombian professional football club based in Ibagué, Tolima Department, that competes in the Categoría Primera A.

Founded in 1954, the club has won the Colombian top tier thrice: in the 2003–II, 2018–I, and 2021–I tournaments, one Copa Colombia in 2014 and one Superliga Colombiana in 2022. They play their home games at Estadio Manuel Murillo Toro.

== History ==
=== Foundation and early history ===
Club Deportes Tolima was founded by Manuel Rubio Chávez on 18 December 1954, when he gave Juan Barbieri (an Argentinian living in Ibagué, Colombia) a sum of $5,000 Colombian pesos in order to hire football players from his native country. Barbieri came back to Colombia with a mix of Argentine and Colombian players such as Jorge Gandulfo, José Jamardo and Enrique Laino. This team competed for the first time in the Colombian football league in 1955, using the uniform of Argentine club Racing Club. In Tolima's league debut, they finished 7th in the league competing with 9 other teams. In 1957, the club finished runner-up in the league.

=== 1980s and 90s ===
Senator Gabriel Camargo Salamanca was given the opportunity to work for the team in the 1980s. He accepted, becoming the biggest stock holder of the team. He bought important players such as Francisco Maturana, Óscar Héctor Quintabani, Osvaldo Redondo, Arnoldo Iguarán, Óscar López, and Janio Cabezas. With this team Deportes Tolima finished as league runner-up in 1981 and 1982. Tolima participated for the first time in an international tournament in the 1982 Copa Libertadores, where the club reached the semi-finals after topping their group consisting of Atlético Nacional, Estudiantes de Mérida, and Deportivo Táchira. The team also played the Copa Libertadores the following year, in 1983, where the team was eliminated in the first round after placing second in their group.

In 1993, the club was relegated to Primera B, or the second division, because of poor results. Tolima played for one year in the second division but won the title, which allowed them to make an immediate return to the top tier for the 1995 season.

=== The first star: 2003 ===
Deportes Tolima had a very interesting group of players for the second half of 2003. These players included Ricardo Ciciliano, Henry Zambrano, Yulián Anchico, Oscar Briceño, Jhon Charría, Jorge Artigas, Nelson Rivas, and Diego Gómez among others. Deportes Tolima finished in sixth place in the league and qualified to the playoffs. The club was placed in a group with against Atlético Nacional, Junior, and Independiente Medellín. When everyone predicted Junior would top the group and advance to the final, Deportes Tolima beat Atlético Nacional 2–0 in Ibagué and Junior lost 1–0 to Independiente Medellín in Medellín. With these results, Deportes Tolima qualified to the final against Deportivo Cali on away goals scored after tying Junior on points and goals scored. Tolima won the first leg of the finals 2–0 in Ibagué with an exceptional performance of Rogeiro Pereira, who scored both goals. In the second leg Tolima lost 3–1 in Cali, which forced penalty kicks as the aggregate score was 3–3. In the penalty shootout, Deportes Tolima only missed one penalty and goalkeeper Diego Gómez saved two penalties, which helped the club win the league title for the first time in history.

As league champion, Tolima qualified for the 2004 Copa Libertadores, where they were eliminated in the group stage after placing third in their group, comprising River Plate, Deportivo Táchira from Venezuela, and Paraguayan side Libertad.

=== 2006 runners-up ===
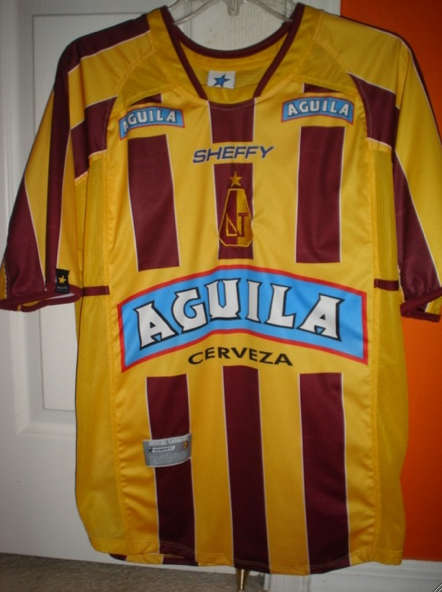
Official 2006 home jersey

2006 was a great year for Tolima. The team was second on the overall table (points added up over the Apertura and Finalización tournaments), scored the most goals in the year (over 80), and were runners up in the league for 2006–II. At the beginning of 2006, Deportes Tolima did not seem like a very strong team for the season as it did not sign any new players. The coach was Jorge Luis Bernal, who had been the reserve team coach for many years. However, the team performed well in both home and away games, with victories against Envigado 7–3, Atlético Nacional 5–1, Millonarios 3–0 away and Huila 4–1 away. They reached the semi-finals of the 2006 Apertura and were placed in a group with Deportivo Pereira, Deportivo Cali, and Once Caldas, and were en route to making the finals until they lost an important game against Pereira, who finished last in the group. Tolima won their last game, but eventually finished in second, three points behind Cali.

The Finalización campaign was even better than the first one. Tolima ended first in the first stage of the league, and played the semi-finals against Atlético Nacional, Deportivo Pasto, and Boyacá Chicó. Atlético Nacional led the group most of the time, while Deportes Tolima remained a point behind. A dramatic 2–1 away win over Nacional made them leaders, and they advanced to the final against Cúcuta Deportivo after beating Boyacá Chicó 2–0 on the final matchday of the group. The first game was away in Cúcuta and Tolima lost 1–0; the return leg in Ibagué ended tied 1–1, with Yulián Anchico scoring Tolima's goal, but it was not enough to win the league title.

Since Tolima finished fifth in the 2005 overall table, they were able to play the 2006 Copa Sudamericana. The team began the competition in the first stage, where they beat Independiente Medellín 4–2 on aggregate. In the next stage, Tolima tied against Mineros de Guayana on aggregate, but passed to the next round on the away goals rule. In the third round, the club was matched up with Pachuca. Tolima won the first leg 2–1 at home, but in the second leg in Mexico they lost 5–1, and Tolima was eliminated from the competition, while Pachuca went on to win the competition. At the end of the year, Bernal left the club.

=== 2007–2009 ===
For the 2007 season Deportes Tolima signed important players like defenders Nicolás Ayr and Javier Arizala, strikers Gustavo Savoia and Jorge Perlaza, and midfielder Jésus Sinisterra. Tolima also got a new coach, Jaime de la Pava. Since Tolima finished second in the 2006 overall table, they qualified for the 2007 Copa Libertadores. They began their campaign in the tournament by defeating Deportivo Táchira on aggregate in the first stage, which qualified the club to the group stage with Grêmio, Cerro Porteño and the team that beat Tolima in the 2006 Finalización finals, Cúcuta Deportivo. Tolima finished third in the group stage and was eliminated after losing to Cúcuta Deportivo at home on the final matchday. In the Apertura tournament, Tolima finished in 12th position, missing out on the playoffs. Shortly after, Jaime de la Pava left his post, citing the failure to qualify to the Libertadores knockout stages and missing out on the playoffs as his reasoning.

For the 2007 Finalización, Jaime de la Pava was replaced by long-time assistant manager Hernán Torres. Tolima qualified to the playoffs as the fourth seed, but failed to reach the finals, finishing third in the group. In the 2008 Apertura, Tolima had a terrible campaign, finishing last in the table, which included heavy losses to Boyaca Chico (7–2) and Independiente Medellin (4–1). This was mainly due to the departures of forwards Jorge Horacio Serna and Darwin Quintero. Despite the terrible campaign, the board decided to keep Torres for the 2008 Finalización, where they had a much better campaign, finishing as the first seed in the regular season and qualifying for the playoffs. In the playoffs, Deportes Tolima struggled in their group, getting seven points in their first four matches, and reaching the fifth game with the need to beat La Equidad in order to retain a chance to advance to the finals. However, a 2–0 loss in Bogotá effectively crushed the Pijao's hopes of making the finals, since Medellín and Nacional had tied in their match, result that qualified the former side for the finals with one match in hand. Although Tolima later beat finalists Independiente Medellín 4–1 on the last matchday, it was useless but still gave the Tolima fans a chance to celebrate a big victory over one of the best teams in the league, and more support for manager Torres as the beginning of a new era.

For the 2009 Apertura, Tolima finished first in the table again and qualified for the playoffs. In the playoffs however, the team was inconsistent and struggled to score, eventually missing out on the finals again. In the 2009 Finalización Tolima finished fifth and qualified for the playoffs, but finished last in their group. In the overall table of the season Tolima finished second, but only qualified for the Copa Sudamericana since the Finalización champions were Independiente Medellín, who had placed third and took the last Libertadores spot by winning the league title.

=== 2010s ===
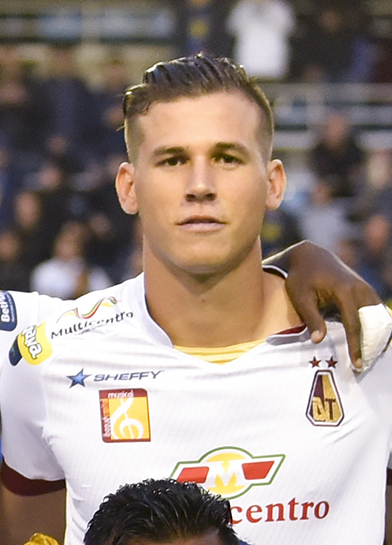
Juan Pablo Vargas played numerous games for Deportes Tolima

In the 2010 Apertura, Tolima finished first in the regular season, this being the third time they did so in the last four tournaments. In the playoffs, there was a new format, with only the top four qualifying for a knockout stage with home-and-away games. Tolima played against La Equidad in their semi-final tie, who eliminated them in a penalty shootout after a 3–3 draw on aggregate. For the 2010 Finalización the team once again topped the regular season table, qualifying for the playoffs, and won their playoff group to make the finals. In the finals, they played Once Caldas: in the first leg at Estadio Manuel Murillo Toro, Tolima won 2–1. However, Once Caldas won the second leg 3–1 and claimed the title with a 4–3 aggregate score, leaving Tolima and their fans in disappointment after having such an excellent campaign but missing out on the championship.

The team began their 2010 Copa Sudamericana campaign in the second stage, beating Bolivian club Oriente Petrolero. In the round of 16, Tolima was matched up with Banfield; a 2–0 loss in Argentina left Tolima close to elimination, but in the second leg in Ibagué they produced a great comeback and won 3–0 to advance to the next stage of the competition. In the quarter-finals, Tolima was paired with Independiente, with the first leg in Ibagué finishing in a 2–2 draw. The second leg in Avellaneda finished in a 0–0 draw with Tolima having a controversial goal disallowed, but the draw meant Independiente progressed to the semi-finals on away goals. Independiente went on to win the competition, which gave the sensation that Tolima had a great campaign since they were close to eliminate the eventual champions.

The club finished first in the 2010 aggregate table, and qualified for the first stage of the 2011 Copa Libertadores. In the first stage, Tolima produced a massive upset by beating Ronaldo's Corinthians 2–0. In the next few days after the match, Ronaldo announced his retirement, with the match against Tolima being the last of his professional career. The Colombian club progressed to the group stage with high expectations after the win against Corinthians, but finished third and was eliminated, including a humiliating 6–1 defeat to Cruzeiro.

In 2014, Tolima won the Copa Colombia for the first time in the club's history, beating Independiente Santa Fe in the finals 3–2 on aggregate.

In June 2018, Tolima won its second league title, beating Atlético Nacional in the 2018 Apertura finals. The first leg played in Ibagué ended with Atlético Nacional winning 1–0. During the second leg in Medellín, Tolima were down 2–1 on aggregate in the 90th minute, but while the local fans were getting ready for the trophy celebration, Danovis Banguero scored in the last play of the game at the 94th minute to equalize the aggregate score and send the game into a penalty shootout, which Tolima won 4–2, ending Nacional's 35 game unbeaten streak and a 15-year drought between titles. In the 2018 Finalización, they finished first in the regular season table, but were eliminated by finalists Independiente Medellín 4–2 on aggregate in the semi-finals.

=== 2020s ===
Deportes Tolima won their third league title in the 2021 Apertura tournament, three years after their last Primera A title. The team managed by Hernán Torres reached the finals after placing fifth in the first stage and knocking out Deportivo Cali and La Equidad in the tournament's knockout stages. They faced Millonarios in the final series, with the first leg played in Ibagué ending in a 1–1 draw. The second leg in Bogotá saw Millonarios take the lead with a goal by Daniel Ruiz in the 23rd minute, only for the Pijao side to stage a comeback in the second half with a brace by Juan Fernando Caicedo, winning the series 3–2 on aggregate. Deportes Tolima also reached the final series of the 2021 Finalización, having the chance to win a league double, but were defeated by Deportivo Cali 3–2 on aggregate.

The 2021 Apertura title qualified Deportes Tolima for the 2022 Superliga Colombiana, in which they once again faced the 2021 Finalización champions, Deportivo Cali. Tolima won their first Superliga title after drawing 1–1 in the first leg played at Estadio Deportivo Cali and winning 1–0 in the second leg played at home.

== Honours ==
=== Domestic ===
- Categoría Primera A
  - Winners (3): 2003–II, 2018–I, 2021–I
- Categoría Primera B
  - Winners (1): 1994
- Copa Colombia
  - Winners (1): 2014
- Superliga Colombiana
  - Winners (1): 2022

== Performance in CONMEBOL competitions ==
- Copa Libertadores: 10 appearances

1982: Semifinals
1983: Group stage
2004: Group stage
2007: Second stage
2011: Second stage

2013: Second stage
2019: Group stage
2020: Third stage
2022: Round of 16
2025: Second stage

- Copa Sudamericana: 11 appearances

2006: Third round
2010: Quarterfinals
2012: Second stage
2015: Round of 16
2016: First stage
2017: First stage

2019: Second stage
2020: Second stage
2021: Group stage
2023: Group stage
2024: First stage

- Copa CONMEBOL: 2 appearances

1996: First round
1997: Quarter-finals

== Players ==
=== Current squad ===
As of 24 September 2026

Note: Flags indicate national team as defined under FIFA eligibility rules; some limited exceptions apply. Players may hold more than one non-FIFA nationality.

No.	Pos.	Nation	Player
1	GK	BRA	Neto Volpi
2	DF	COL	Anderson Angulo (captain)
3	DF	COL	Jan Carlos Angulo
4	DF	COL	Daniel Pedrozo
5	DF	COL	Juan José Mera
6	MF	COL	Cristian Trujillo
7	FW	COL	Jorge Cabezas Hurtado (on loan from Watford)
8	FW	COL	Ever Valencia
9	FW	COL	Luis Sandoval (on loan from Independiente Medellín)
10	MF	COL	Luis Sánchez
11	FW	COL	Jader Valencia
12	GK	COL	Jhon Azcárate
13	GK	MEX	Miguel Ortega
14	DF	COL	Homer Martínez (on loan from Juárez)
15	FW	USA	Sergio Aguayo (on loan from Tapatío)
16	MF	COL	Víctor Reyes
17	DF	COL	Cristian Arrieta

No.	Pos.	Nation	Player
18	MF	COL	Kelvin Flórez
19	MF	COL	Santiago Joven
20	DF	COL	Junior Hernández
22	FW	COL	Santiago Urrutia
23	GK	COL	Gali Balanta
24	FW	COL	Adrián Parra
25	FW	COL	Jeinner Fuentes
27	DF	COL	Michael Martínez
28	FW	COL	Edwar López
29	MF	COL	Neifer Sánchez
30	DF	COL	Shean Barbosa
31	FW	COL	Yoimar Moreno
32	MF	COL	Sebastián Guzmán
33	DF	COL	Jherson Mosquera
71	DF	VEN	Yordan Osorio
80	MF	COL	Brayan Rovira

=== Out on loan ===
Note: Flags indicate national team as defined under FIFA eligibility rules; some limited exceptions apply. Players may hold more than one non-FIFA nationality.

No.	Pos.	Nation	Player
—	DF	COL	Jhon Quiñones (at Cúcuta Deportivo)
—	DF	COL	Léider Riascos (at Llaneros)

=== World Cup players ===
The following players were chosen to represent their country at the FIFA World Cup while contracted to Deportes Tolima.

- (Colombia) Aníbal Alzate (1962)
- (Colombia) Luis Antonio Moreno (1998)

== Notable players ==
- (Argentina) José Jamardo (1955–1960), (1965–1967)
- (Colombia) German Castellanos (1961–1974)
- (Paraguay) Tito Ramón Correa (1979–1981)
- (Argentina) (Paraguay) Cristino Centurión (1980–1982)
- (Argentina) (Colombia) Víctor del Río (1980–1982), (1984)
- (Paraguay) Óscar López (1981)
- (Colombia) Américo Quiñonez (1981–1982)
- (Colombia) Arnoldo Iguarán (1982)
- (Paraguay) Evaristo Isasi (1982)
- (Uruguay) Freddy Clavijo (1982–1983)
- (Uruguay) José Luis Russo (1983–1984)
- (Uruguay) Hebert Revetria (1984)
- (Socialist Federal Republic of Yugoslavia) Teodor Kovač (1986)
- (Colombia) Albeiro Usuriaga (1987)
- (Argentina) Fabio Giménez (1991–1992)
- (Colombia) Álex Fernández (1993)
- (Colombia) Leonardo Fabio Moreno (1994–1995)
- (Paraguay) Julio César Yegros (1994–1995)
- (Colombia) Orlando Maturana (1995–1997), (1999)
- (Colombia) Luis Antonio Moreno (1995–2001)
- (Colombia) Luis Carlos Perea (1996)
- (Nigeria) Felix Ademola (1996)
- (Colombia) Gerardo Bedoya (1996–1997)
- (Colombia) Luis Quiñónes (1996–1999)
- (Costa Rica) Roy Myers (1997)
- (Paraguay) Walter Avalos (1997)
- (Uruguay) Luis Barbat (1997–1999)
- (Colombia) Álex Orrego (1997–2000), (2002)
- (Costa Rica) Wilmer López (1998)
- (Uruguay) Gustavo Matosas (1998)
- (Colombia) Arley Dinas (1998–2000), (2003–2005)
- (Colombia) Gonzalo Martínez (1998–2001), (2005)
- (Colombia) Elson Becerra (1998–2002)
- (Colombia) Wilmer Cabrera (1999–2000)
- (Colombia) Oscar Passo (1999–2005)
- (Colombia) Jhon Charría (2000), (2002–2008)
- (Panama) Luis Tejada (2003–2004)
- (Uruguay) Jorge Artigas (2003)
- (Brazil) Rogerio Pereira (2003)
- (Colombia) Diego Gómez (2003–04), (2006)
- (Colombia) Yulián Anchico (2003–2007)
- (Colombia) Gerardo Vallejo (2004), (2005–2012)
- (Colombia) Agustín Julio (2004–2007)
- (Colombia) Javier Arizala (2004–2007)
- (Colombia) Juan Carlos Escobar (2004–2007), (2012)
- (Paraguay) Silvio Garay (2005)
- (Colombia) Víctor Bonilla (2005)
- (Colombia) Carlos Quintero (2005–2007)
- (Brazil) Gauchinho (2006)
- (Brazil) (Bolivia) Alex da Rosa (2006)
- (Colombia) Gilberto García (2006–2007), (2008)
- (Argentina) Gustavo Savoia (2007)
- (Colombia) Jésus Sinisterra (2007)
- (Paraguay) Carlos González (2007–2008)
- (Colombia) Jorge Perlaza (2007–2010)
- (Colombia) Gustavo Bolívar (2007–2012)
- (Brazil) Fernando Oliveira (2007–2008)
- (Paraguay) David Villalba (2008)
- (Colombia) Bréiner Castillo (2008–2010)
- (Colombia) Cristian Marrugo (2008–2012)
- (Colombia) Wilder Medina (2008–2011)
- (Paraguay) José Cáceres (2009)
- (Argentina) Hugo Centurión (2010)
- (Paraguay) Julio Ortellado (2010)
- (Argentina) Rodrigo Marangoni (2010)
- (Colombia) Diego Chará (2010–2011)
- (Colombia) Yimmi Chará (2010–2014)
- (Paraguay) Antony Silva (2010–2014)
- (Paraguay) Luis Closa (2011)
- (Paraguay) Roberto Gamarra (2011)
- (Paraguay) Pablo Giménez (2011)
- (Bolivia) Diego Cabrera (2011)
- (Paraguay) Robin Ramírez (2012)
- (Paraguay) Manuel Maciel (2012)
- (Colombia) David Macalister Silva (2012–2014)
- (Colombia) Andrés Andrade (2012–2013)
- (Colombia) Jhon Valencia (2013–2016)
- (Paraguay) (Brazil) Rogerio Leichtweis (2013)
- (Colombia) Sergio Otálvaro (2013)
- (Peru) Roberto Merino (2013)
- (Colombia) Marco Pérez (2014–2019)
- (Colombia) Sebastián Villa (2014–2018)
- (Colombia) Mateus Uribe (2015–2016)
- (Paraguay) Joel Silva (2015–2018)
- (Panama) Gabriel Gómez (2016)
- (Colombia) Santiago Montoya (2016–2017)
- (Colombia) Ángelo Rodríguez (2016–2018)
- (Colombia) Danovis Banguero (2017–2020)
- (Panama) Luis Ovalle (2017)
- (Colombia) Álvaro Montero (2018–2021)
- (Venezuela) Yohandry Orozco (2018), (2021–2023)
