= Constantino Perales =

Peruvian footballer (1929–2020)

Personal information
- Full name: Constantino Perales del Río
- Date of birth: 11 March 1929
- Place of birth: Ica, Peru
- Date of death: 24 April 2020 (aged 91)
- Place of death: León, Mexico
- Position: Defender

Senior career*
Years	Team	Apps	(Gls)
1944–1946	Sport Victoria		
1947–1949	Deportivo Municipal		
1949–1951	Independiente Medellín		
1951–1953	Deportivo Municipal		
1953–1957	C.D. Oro		
1957–1962	Club León		
- * Club domestic league appearances and goals

Constantino Perales del Río (Ica, 11 March 1929 – León, 24 April 2020) was a Peruvian professional footballer who played as defender. He is the brother of Enrique and Agapito Perales, who are also footballers.

== Biography ==
Having come from the ranks of Sport Victoria in his hometown of Ica, Perales joined Deportivo Municipal in 1947 before moving to Colombia in 1949 to play for Independiente Medellín alongside a legion of Peruvian footballers (12 players including his brothers Enrique and Agapito Perales, Segundo Castillo, Roberto Drago and Luis Guzmán among others).

Returning to Deportivo Municipal between 1951 and 1953, he then moved to Mexico, playing successively for C.D. Oro (1953–1957) and Club León (1957–1962). He won the Copa MX with the latter team in 1958 and was a teammate of the famous Mexican goalkeeper Antonio Carbajal. Perales, who remained in Mexico, died in León on 24 April 2020.

== Honours ==
Club León

- Copa MX: 1958
