= Rogério Pereira =

Brazilian footballer

Jerry Pereira
Personal information
- Full name: Rogério de Carvalho Pereira
- Date of birth: 14 December 1965 (age 60)
- Place of birth: Brazil
- Position: Defender

Senior career*
Years	Team	Apps	(Gls)
1988–1989	Santa Maria	22	(1)
1989–1992	Joane		
1992–1993	Quarteirense		
1993–1996	Slavia Sofia	34	(2)
1995–1996	→ Shumen (loan)	?	(?)
1996	Shumen	?	(?)
1997–1998	Belasitsa Petrich	?	(?)
- * Club domestic league appearances and goals

Rogério de Carvalho Pereira (born 14 December 1965), simply known as Jerry Pereira, is a former Brazilian professional footballer who is currently a football agent.

== Career ==
Pereira made a name for himself in the top Bulgarian league, where he donned the colours of Slavia Sofia, Shumen and Belasitsa Petrich in the 1990s. Pereira is believed to be the first Brazilian to play in the highest division of Bulgaria. After his retirement, he became a football agent, representing many Brazilian men's footballers.
