= Agapito Perales =

Peruvian footballer (1919–1994)

Personal information
- Full name: Agapito Perales del Río
- Date of birth: 14 March 1919
- Place of birth: Ica, Peru
- Date of death: 27 April 1994 (aged 75)
- Position: Defender

Senior career*
Years	Team	Apps	(Gls)
1937	Sport Victoria		
1938–1939	Sporting Tabaco		
1940–1941	Alianza Lima		
1942–1944	Deportivo Municipal		
1944–1946	Halcones de Orizaba		
1946–1949	C.D. Oro		
1950–1951	Independiente Medellín		
1954–1955	Sporting Tabaco		
1956	Mariscal Sucre		

International career
1955	Peru	1	(0)
- * Club domestic league appearances and goals

Agapito Perales del Río (14 March 1919 – 27 April 1994) was a Peruvian footballer who played as a defender.

He played one game for Peru, on 13 March 1955, against Ecuador, during the 1955 South American Championship. His brothers Enrique and Constantino also played for Peru national team.

Perales played defenseman and was known for his ball handling and heading skills. He started playing for Sport Victoria in his hometown.
