= Independiente Medellín =

Association football club in Colombia

- Full name: Deportivo Independiente Medellín
- Nicknames: El Rojo Paisa (The Paisa Red); El Poderoso de la Montaña (The Mighty of the Mountain); El Decano (The Dean); El Equipo del Pueblo (The People's Team); Medallo
- Short name: DIM
- Founded: 14 November 1913; 112 years ago as Medellín Foot Ball Club
- Ground: Atanasio Girardot
- Capacity: 44,826
- President: Juan Camilo Restrepo
- Head coach: Luis Amaranto Perea
- League: Categoría Primera A
- 2025: Primera A, 2nd of 20
- Website: dimoficial.com
Home colours	Away colours

Deportivo Independiente Medellín, also known as Independiente Medellín or DIM, is a Colombian professional football club based in Medellín that currently plays in the Categoría Primera A. They play their home games at Estadio Atanasio Girardot, which seats 40,943 people, and is also shared with city rivals Atlético Nacional. The team is dubbed "El Poderoso de la Montaña" (Mighty of the Mountain) due to Medellín's geographical location high in the Andes Mountains, and as a reference to the many amateur titles it won in its early years.

Founded in 1913 as the second oldest club in Colombia, Independiente Medellín has won the Categoría Primera A six times: in 1955, 1957, 2002–II, 2004–I, 2009–II, and 2016–I, and the Copa Colombia three times: in 1981, 2019, and 2020. Its best performance at international level was in 2003, when the team reached the semifinals of the Copa Libertadores.

Independiente Medellín has a rivalry with Atlético Nacional, and the teams face each other in El Clásico Paisa, which is considered one of the most important derbies in the country.

== History ==
=== Early years ===
Independiente Medellín was founded on 14 November 1913 under the name of Medellín Foot Ball Club by siblings Alberto, Luis, and Rafael Uribe Piedrahíta. The team played its first match against Sporting Medellín, who defeated them 11–0.

The club won amateur titles in 1918, 1920, 1922, 1923 and 1930; with these titles it became one of the most important teams of Colombia at the time.

In 1948, Medellín joined professional football and played the first edition of the Colombian professional league. Medellín placed seventh out of 10 teams, winning seven matches. Their first match was a 4–0 defeat against América de Cali. Their first win was 3–2 against Junior.

=== 1950–1954: "La Danza del Sol" ===
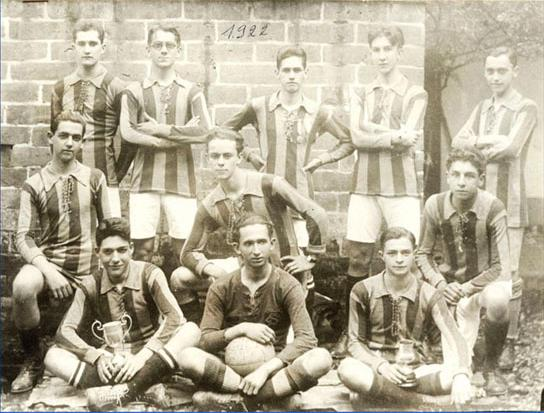
The 1922 amateur squad proudly showcasing the coveted national cups earned in 1918 and 1920

In 1950, Medellin signed many Peruvian footballers in a movement known as El Dorado, when Colombian teams signed many foreign footballers. Some of the players signed include brothers Constantino Perales and Agapito Perales, Segundo Castillo, Roberto Drago and Luis Guzmán Gonzales. This squad was dubbed "La Danza del Sol", and that season the club finished fourth with 34 points.

Medellín did not play in 1952 and 1953 due to economic problems. In 1953, the club changed its entire administration and was renamed to its current name, Deportivo Independiente Medellín. In the club's first season back, the 1954 season, they finished third in the league table. 1954 also marked the arrival of Argentine footballer José Manuel "El Charro" Moreno, who had won two South American championships with Argentina and many trophies at River Plate.

=== 1955–1970: First Golden Age ===
Under El Charro's command, who had taken a role as a player-manager, DIM won its first title in the 1955 Campeonato Profesional, finishing first with 31 points and just one defeat. Argentine striker Felipe Marino was the tournament's top goalscorer, with 22 goals. The team won its second title two years later, in 1957, with almost the same players as the previous seasons. José Vicente Grecco was the top scorer of the tournament. Despite having strong squads, in 1959 and 1961 DIM finished runner-up to Millonarios, who had one of the strongest sides in Colombian football history and won four straight titles from 1960 to 1964; in 1964, DIM also came close to winning the title, finishing third but only three points from Millonarios.

In 1966, Medellín achieved their first ever qualification for the Copa Libertadores, after finishing runner-up in the league. They played against Argentine sides Racing de Avellaneda and River Plate, Bolivian teams 31 de Octubre and Bolívar, and fellow Colombians Independiente Santa Fe. They finished fifth out of six in their group and were eliminated.

=== 1971–1983: Lacklustre campaigns, Copa Colombia title ===
In 1971, Medellin did not participate in the league due to economic hardships. The 70s were a low point for the club; the club were consistently finishing in the middle to bottom half of the league table, and were never close to winning the title.

The club won its first Copa Colombia in 1981; although this title is not officially recognized by many experts nor by DIMAYOR, it is recognized by CONMEBOL. Despite the joy of winning their first cup, in the 1981 league season, the club had a lacklustre season and finished last in the aggregate table with 38 points from 47 matches. Things improved for the rest of the 80s, and despite not winning anymore titles for the decade, the club was consistently qualifying for the octagonal finals.

=== 1984–1998: Slow Improvements ===
In 1984, with young manager Julio Comesaña at the post, the club finished third in the octogonal, the best participation the club had in the league since 1964.

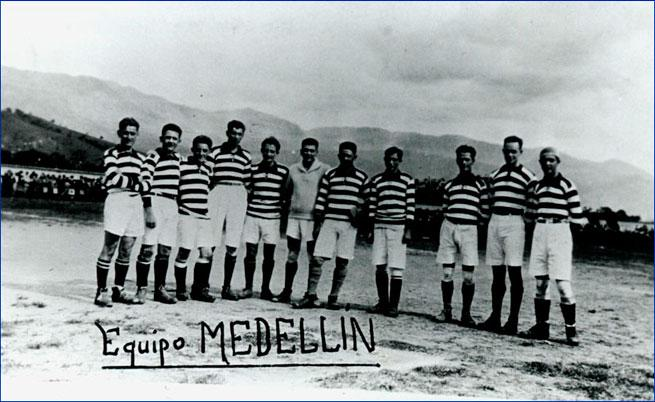
Medellín in 1928

==== 1989: cancelled season ====
In 1989, a year where Medellín had one of the strongest squads in the league and was expected to win the title, a tragic event occurred. In one of the final games of the season, Medellín tied América de Cali 0–0 at home. During the game, linesman Álvaro Ortega disallowed a Medellín goal, angering many people. Reports say that a person that had been sent by Pablo Escobar hunted Ortega down and murdered him, with the motive being a lost bet on the match. In response, the Colombian Football Federation decided to cancel the rest of the season, which left the 1989 league season without a winner.

==== 1993: Heartbreaking runner-up season ====
On 19 December 1993, going into the last match of the 1993 season, Medellín and Junior were fighting for a tight first place, as both clubs had the same number of points. Junior was playing América de Cali at home in Barranquilla while simultaneously Medellín played hometown rivals Atlético Nacional. A Medellín win combined with a Junior loss or draw would give Medellín the title. At halftime América were leading the game in Barranquilla 1–0 and in Medellin the game was still 0–0; at that moment América were winning the title due to the draw in Medellín. Junior scored two goals to put the game at 2–1 with ten minutes remaining, and Medellín scored at the same time to put the game at 1–0. América tied the game at 2–2 with seven minutes remaining. The match at Estadio Anatasio Girardot ended with Medellín winning 1–0 while awaiting the 2–2 game in Barranquilla to end, which still had five minutes remaining due to a delay at the start of the second half. Medellín players were celebrating with a victory lap and giving interviews with reporters white they waited for the final whistle in Barranquilla. However, Oswaldo Mackenzie scored a late goal in the 89th minute and gave Junior the 3–2 win and the title, leaving the Medellín players and fans heartbroken.

As a result of their great campaign, Medellin returned to the Copa Libertadores for the first time in almost three decades. Entering the 1994 edition, they topped their group and then beat Universitario in the round of 16 before being eliminated by Junior in the quarter-finals.

In the 1994 league season, Medellin had a great season and qualified to the Cuadrangular final, a group of four teams with one of them being rivals Nacional. Going into the last match of the season, Medellin did not have any chance at winning the title, but a win or draw would prevent Nacional from achieving the title; however the match ended 1–0 in favor of Nacional and Nacional won the title.

=== 1999–2009: End of title drought ===
El Poderoso had a great 1999 season, finishing in the top eight of both Apertura and Finalización tournaments, and finishing fourth in the aggregate table. This season was different from the standard format; in the Apertura tournament there were no playoffs. The Finalizacion tournament had playoffs, where Medellin topped their group and qualified for the Finalizacion finals against rivals Nacional, with the winner playing the Apertura tournament champion in a championship final to decide the 1999 league champion. Medellin lost the Finalizacion finals to Nacional 1–0 on aggregate, and Nacional went on to win the league title against Améric, while Medellin missed out on a spot for the 2000 Copa Libertadores.

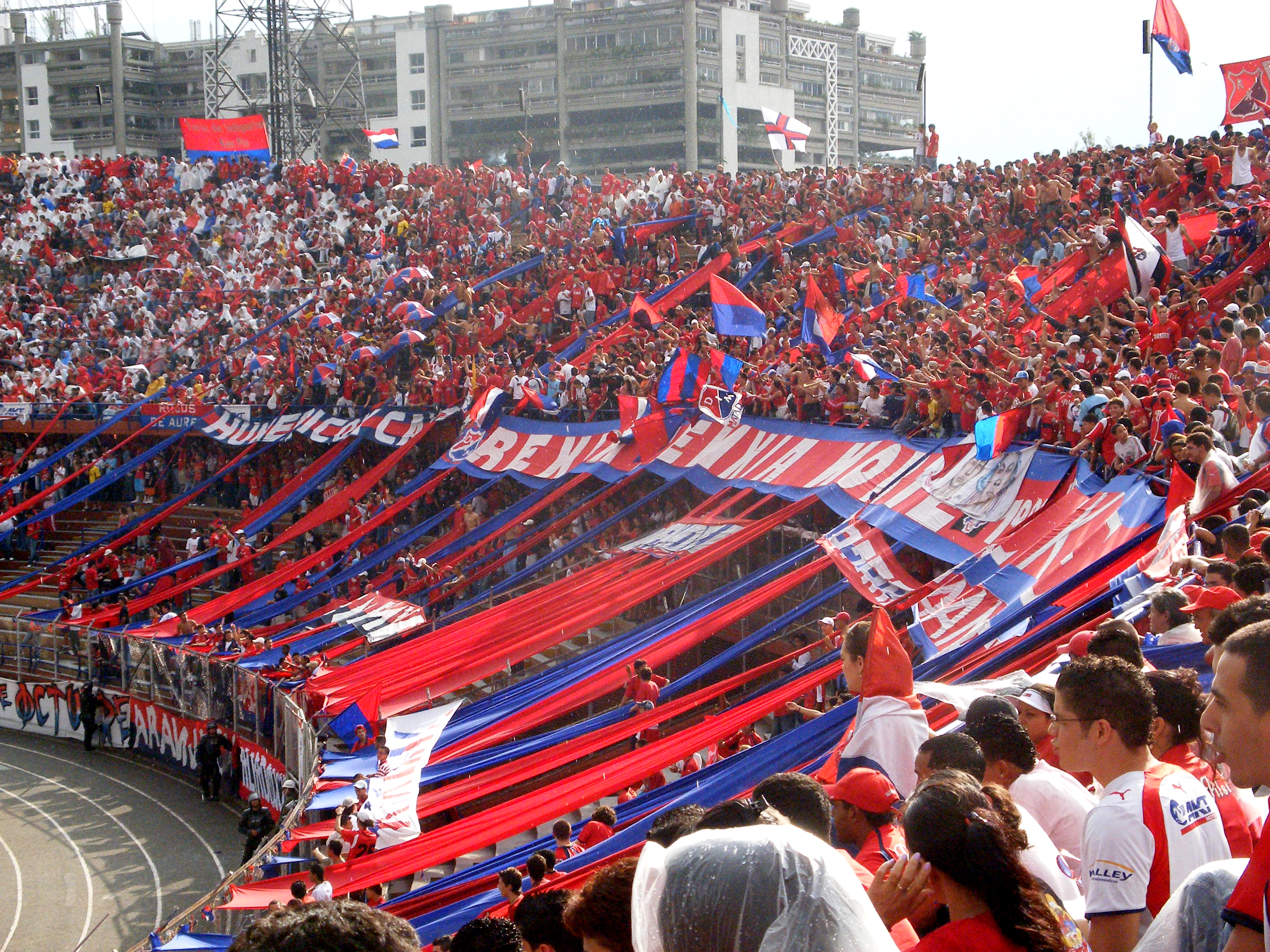
Barra brava supporters Rexixtenxia Norte at Estadio Atanasio Girardot

Medellin came close to winning their third league title in 2001 thanks to Jorge Serna's prolific goalscoring, who finished as top scorer tied with Carlos Castro on 29 goals. The club ended up losing the final to América de Cali 3–0 on aggregate, although they reached the final in an unexpected manner; in the regular season they finished in 10th place and occupied the last seed for the eight teams that qualified for the playoffs through the aggregate table.

After 45 long years of agony, Medellín won its third league title in the 2002 Finalización tournament under manager Víctor Luna, who replaced Reinaldo Rueda halfway through the season after he was sacked due to poor results. Medellín played against Deportivo Pasto in the two-legged final. El Rojo Paisa beat Pasto 2–0 at home in the first leg with goals from Robinson Muñoz and an own goal from Julio César Valencia. In the second leg on 23 December 2002, Medellín drew 1–1 away from home, with Mauricio Molina scoring Medellín's goal from a free-kick, helping the team lift the trophy after a 3–1 aggregate score.

The 2002 league title gave the club a spot in the 2003 Copa Libertadores, where they qualified for the knockout stages by topping their group with twelve points, which consisted of Boca Juniors, Barcelona, and Colo-Colo. During the group stage, the club famously beat Bianchi's Boca Juniors, 1–0. "Medallo" beat Cerro Porteño on penalties in the round of 16 and Grêmio in the quarter-finals to reach the semi-finals for the first time in its history, with their opponent being Santos. In the first leg played at Estádio Urbano Caldeira, DIM lost 1–0. In the second leg at home, Tressor Moreno scored first to level the aggregate score at 1–1, but the club eventually lost the game 3–2 (4–2 on aggregate) and was eliminated, narrowly missing out for the final, which would have been played against their group stage opponent, Boca Juniors.

In the 2004 Apertura, Medellín and Nacional qualified for the finals, setting up the first "Paisa" finals in the league's history. The final was played over two legs, both at Atanasio Girardot: in the first leg, Medellín won 2–1 with goals scored by Rafael Castillo and Jorge Serna. The second leg was played on 27 June; it ended 0–0 and Medellín became the champion of the 2004 Apertura, its fourth league title, won under manager Pedro Sarmiento. In the 2004 Finalizacion, the club also made the playoffs, but finished third in its group and were eliminated.

In the 2005 Copa Libertadores, the club topped their group, which was made up of Atletico Paranaense, América de Cali, and Libertad. They also unexpectedly beat Paranaense 4–0 away in Curitiba on their way to the round of 16, where they faced Banfield and lost 5–0 on aggregate.

In the 2008 Finalización, the club almost won its fifth title, but lost the final to América de Cali with Santiago Escobar as head coach. The next season, the 2009 Apertura, was very poor; the team finished in last place. However, in the 2009 Torneo Finalización, with the departure of Santiago Escobar as head coach, his assistant, Leonel Álvarez, replaced him, and the team got its fifth title, beating Atlético Huila 3–2 on aggregate. In that season, Jackson Martinez broke the league's top scoring record with 18 goals (the previous record was Léider Preciado's 17 goals), a record that was broken again later by Cortuluá forward Miguel Borja in 2016, with 19 goals.

=== 2010–present: Back-to-back runner-ups and sixth league title ===
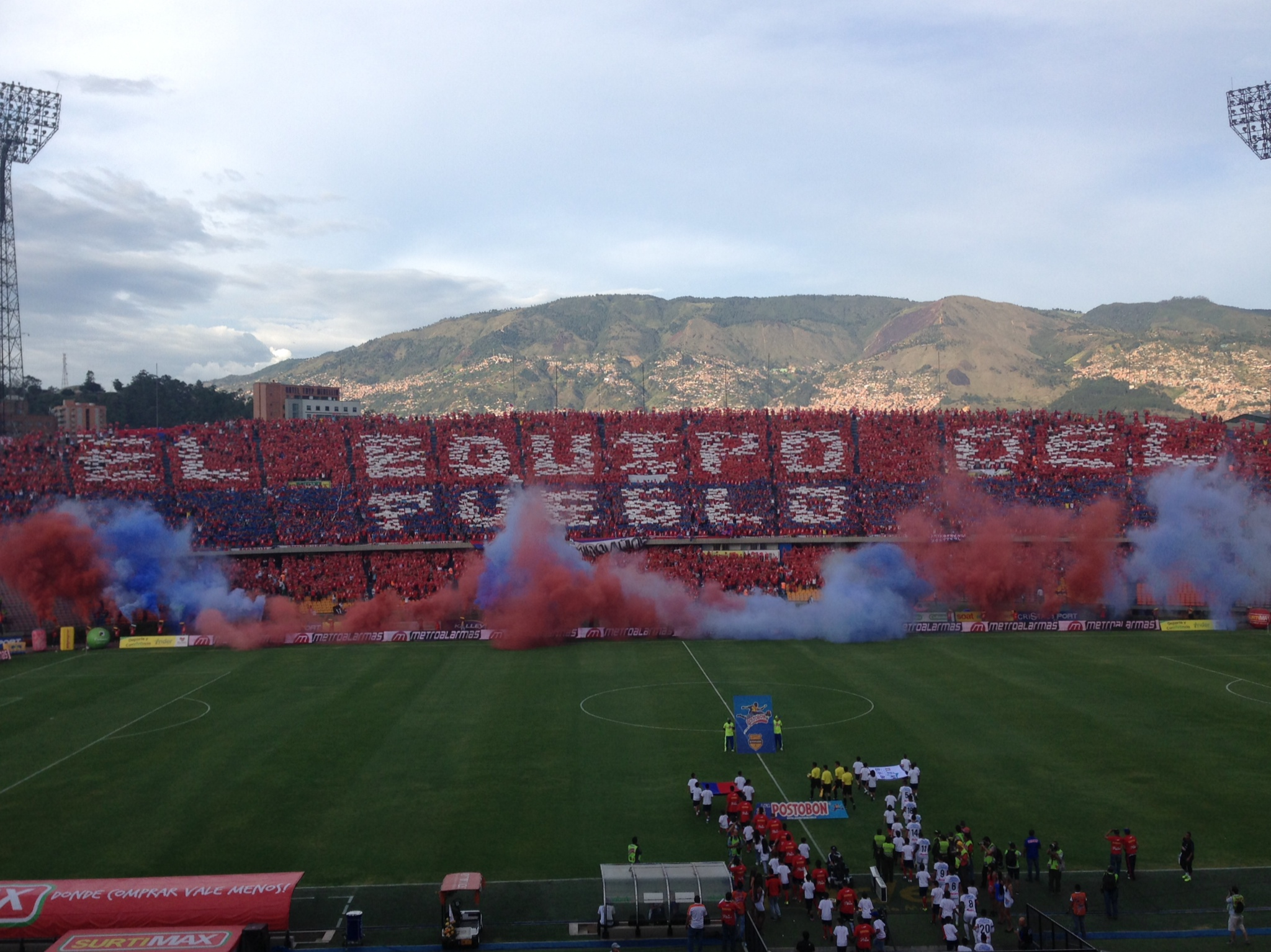
Tifo by the Medellín fans which reads "El Equipo del Pueblo" (The People's team) before a league fixture against Once Caldas in 2014

Previous logo.

During the 2010s, DIM was close to winning league titles several times. In the 2012 Finalizacion, they qualified to the finals with a last minute goal from Ray Vanegas against Itagui Ditaires. Their rival in the finals was Millonarios, and after a 1–1 draw on aggregate, DIM lost on penalties. In 2014, they finished as runners-up to Independiente Santa Fe in that year's Finalización tournament. Six months later they made the final again, this time losing to Deportivo Cali. These losses were finally overcome in the 2016 season, where the club won its sixth league title. In the Apertura tournament, they finished first in the regular season table with 40 points. Then they eliminated Deportivo Cali and Cortuluá in the playoffs to set up a final with Junior; the first leg in Barranquilla ended 1–1 and the second leg was won by Medellín 2–0, with Christian Marrugo scoring a brace and securing a 3–1 aggregate victory.

With the 2016 league title, El Poderoso gained a spot in the 2017 Copa Libertadores, returning to the tournament for the first time since 2010. They were placed in Group 3 along with River Plate, Emelec, and Melgar. The club placed third in the group and was transferred to the Copa Sudamericana, where they eventually lost to Racing Club in the second round. One of the highlights of their Copa Libertadores run was beating powerhouse River Plate 2–1 at Estadio Monumental.

== Rivalries ==
Medellín's greatest rivalry is with the city's other major club, Atlético Nacional, in a match known as Clásico Paisa (Paisa derby). Both clubs share the same stadium; Atanasio Girardot. Atlético Nacional has a clear advantage over Independiente Medellín in titles won, with 35 titles (most in Colombia) to Medellín's 9 titles. However, Medellín defeated Nacional in the first final series played between both, in the 2004 Apertura. This was considered as an upset, since Nacional's squad had a much higher value that Medellín's.

The rivalry is especially strong due to each team's main fanbases; Rexixtenxia Norte for Independiente Medellín and Los Del Sur for Atlético Nacional. There are often fights between these two fanbases, which is why sometimes only the fanbase of one team is allowed entry. The two clubs are named with the location that they occupy in the stadium; Rexixtenxia Norte occupy the northern section and Los Del Sur occupy the southern section.

The first Clásico Paisa was played on 12 September 1948, where Medellín beat Nacional 3–0. Over 300 matches have been played between the two clubs, with Nacional dominating the historical record by 40 wins.

The club also has minor rivalries with other clubs in the Medellín Metropolitan Area, such as Envigado, Águilas Doradas, and Leones. Although none of these teams have won Primera Division titles, matches between them still draw large crowds due to their close geographical location

== Honours ==
=== Domestic ===
- Categoría Primera A
  - Winners (6): 1955, 1957, 2002–II, 2004–I, 2009–II, 2016–I
- Copa Colombia
  - Winners (3): 1981, 2019, 2020
- Superliga Colombiana
  - Runners-up (1): 2017

=== Regional ===
- Campeonato Nacional
  - Winners (7): 1918, 1920, 1922, 1930, 1936, 1937, 1938
- Campeonato Departamental
  - Winners (8): 1937, 1938, 1939, 1941, 1942, 1943, 1944, 1945

=== Friendly tournaments ===
- Copa Jimenez Jaramillo (1): 1923
- Copa Club Unión: 1942
- Triangular ‘Trofeo Coltejer’: 1955
- Torneo "Medellín sin tugurios": 1983
- Copa Montreal (Canada): 1992
- Copa DC United: 1994
- Copa Ciudad de Popayán: 2005
- Copa Gobernación de Antioquia: 2008, 2010
- Copa del Pacífico: 2009

== Performance in CONMEBOL competitions ==
- Copa Libertadores: 10 appearances

1967: First round
1994: Quarter-finals
2003: Semi-finals (third place)
2005: Round of 16
2009: Group stage
2010: Second round
2017: Group stage
2019: Second stage
2020: Group stage
2023: Group stage

- Copa Sudamericana: 6 appearances

2006: First round
2016: Quarter-finals
2017: First round
2018: First round
2022: Group stage
2023: Knockout round play-offs

- Copa Conmebol: 1 appearance

1995: First round

== Players ==
=== Current squad ===
As of 15 September 2026

Note: Flags indicate national team as defined under FIFA eligibility rules; some limited exceptions apply. Players may hold more than one non-FIFA nationality.

No.	Pos.	Nation	Player
1	GK	URU	Salvador Ichazo
4	DF	COL	Kevin Mantilla (on loan from Talleres de Córdoba)
5	DF	URU	Joaquín Varela
6	MF	COL	Didier Moreno (captain)
7	MF	COL	Léider Berrío
8	MF	COL	Juan Fernando Quintero
9	FW	COL	Jeison Medina (on loan from LDU Quito)
10	MF	COL	Daniel Cataño
11	FW	COL	Yony González
12	GK	COL	Simón Romero
13	DF	COL	Jhan Mena
14	MF	COL	Baldomero Perlaza
15	FW	COL	Jackson Martínez
16	MF	COL	Halam Loboa
17	FW	COL	Gerónimo Mancilla
18	DF	COL	Frank Fabra

No.	Pos.	Nation	Player
19	DF	COL	Alfonso Simarra
20	FW	COL	John Montaño (on loan from Lommel)
21	MF	ARG	Agustín Martegani (on loan from Boca Juniors)
24	FW	COL	Nivaldo Erazo
25	GK	COL	Eder Chaux
26	MF	COL	Esneyder Mena
28	FW	COL	Andrés Dávila
30	DF	COL	Hayen Palacios (on loan from Athletico Paranaense)
31	FW	COL	Diego Moreno
32	FW	COL	Carlos Lucumí
33	FW	URU	Enzo Larrosa
34	MF	COL	Keiner Klinger
39	DF	COL	Luis Escorcia
70	FW	COL	Juan José Córdoba (on loan from Dinamo Zagreb)
—	MF	COL	Alexis Serna
—	FW	COL	Luis Maturana

=== Out on loan ===
Note: Flags indicate national team as defined under FIFA eligibility rules; some limited exceptions apply. Players may hold more than one non-FIFA nationality.

No.	Pos.	Nation	Player
—	GK	COL	Iker Blanco (at Orsomarso)
—	GK	COL	Yimmy Gómez (at Deportivo Pereira)
—	DF	COL	Leyser Chaverra (at Deportivo Cali)
—	DF	COL	Daniel Londoño (at Once Caldas)

No.	Pos.	Nation	Player
—	DF	COL	Malcom Palacios (at Bogotá)
—	MF	COL	Jaime Alvarado (at Once Caldas)
—	MF	COL	Francisco Chaverra (at Millonarios)
—	FW	COL	Luis Sandoval (at Deportes Tolima)

=== World Cup players ===
The following players were chosen to represent their country at the FIFA World Cup while contracted with Independiente Medellín.

- (Colombia) Héctor Echeverri (1962)
- (Colombia) Efraín "Caimán" Sánchez (1962)
- (Paraguay) Alfredo Mendoza (1986)
- (Colombia) Gabriel Jaime Gómez (1990)
- (Colombia) Adolfo Valencia (1998)
- (Paraguay) Aldo Bobadilla (2010)

== Club statistics ==
=== Top scorers ===
As of 27 October 2021

No.	Name	Goals	Country
1	German Cano	129	(Argentina)
2	José Vicente Grecco	92	(Argentina)
3	Carlos Castro	91	(Colombia)
4	Felipe Marino	77	(Argentina)
5	Jorge Serna	75	(Colombia)
6	Diego Álvarez	69	(Colombia)
7	Uriel Cadavid	65	(Colombia)
8	Perfecto Rodríguez	64	(Argentina)
9	Jackson Martinez	56	(Colombia)
10	Jaime Castrillón	55	(Colombia)

=== Most appearances ===
As of 27 October 2021

No.	Name	Games	Country
1	Héctor Echeverri	457	(Colombia)
2	Ricardo Calle	418	(Colombia)
3	Roberto Carlos Cortés	351	(Colombia)
4	Ponciano Castro	342	(Colombia)
5	David González	337	(Colombia)
6	John Restrepo	335	(Colombia)
7	José Zárate	318	(Colombia)
8	Álvaro Escobar	315	(Colombia)
9	Carlos Castro	292	(Colombia)
10	Rodolfo Avila	283	(Argentina)

== Managers ==
- (Paraguay) Delfín Benítez Cáceres (1954–57)
- (Argentina) José Manuel Moreno (1957)
- (Argentina) René Seghini (1957–58)
- (Argentina) Pedro Roque Retamozo (interim) (1958)
- (Argentina) René Seghini (1958–59)
- (Argentina) Fernando Paternoster (1960)
- (Colombia) Efraín Sánchez (1960)
- (Argentina) José Manuel Moreno (1960–62)
- (Colombia) Carlos Alberto Díaz (1962)
- (Colombia) Efraín Sánchez (1962–63)
- (Argentina) José Vicente Grecco (1963)
- (Colombia) Luis López García (1963–64)
- (Argentina) José Vicente Grecco (1964–66)
- (Chile) Francisco Hormazábal (1966–67)
- (Colombia) Leonel Vargas (interim) (1967)
- (Colombia) Rodrigo Fonnegra (1968–70)
- (Argentina) Héctor Molina (interim) (1969)
- (Colombia) Humberto Álvarez (interim) (1969)
- (Argentina) Ricardo Ramaciotti (1972)
- (Chile) Francisco Hormazábal (1972–74)
- (Colombia) Humberto Ortiz (1974–75)
- (Argentina) José Vicente Grecco (1975)
- (Argentina) Juan José Pizzuti (1975–76)
- (Colombia) Justo Lopera (1976)
- (Argentina) Edilberto Righi & Pedro Soma (1976–77)
- (Colombia) Darío Velez (interim) (1977)
- (Colombia) Efraín Sánchez (1977–78)
- (Colombia) Bernardo Valencia (interim) (1978–79)
- (Argentina) Néstor Togneri (1978–79)
- (Colombia) Bernando Valencia (1979)
- (Colombia) Víctor Rodríguez (1980)
- (Argentina) Ricardo Ramaciotti (1980)
- (Colombia) Leonel Montoya (1981)
- (Argentina) Jorge Olmedo (1982)
- (Uruguay) (Colombia) Julio Comesaña (1982–86)
- (Colombia) Carlos Miguel Diaz (interim) (1983)
- (Colombia) Bernando Valencia (1986)
- (Argentina) Ricardo Ramaciotti (1986–87)
- (Colombia) German Aceros (1987–88)
- (Colombia) Gonzalo Montoya (interim) (1988)
- (Colombia) Hugo Gallego (1988)
- (Colombia) Jaime Rodríguez (1989–91)
- (Uruguay) (Colombia) Julio Comesaña (1992)
- (Colombia) Hugo Gallego (1992)
- (Colombia) Nelson Gallego (1992)
- (Colombia) Luis Augusto García (1993–95)
- (Uruguay) Juan Mujica (1994)
- (Colombia) Nolberto Molina (1995)
- (Colombia) Jairo Rios (1995–96)
- (Colombia) Carlos Restrepo (1996–97)
- (Colombia) Víctor Luna (1997)
- (Croatia) Zlatko Petričević (1997)
- (Colombia) Fernando Castro (1998–98)
- (Colombia) Óscar Aristizábal (1998–99)
- (Uruguay) (Colombia) Julio Comesaña (2000)
- (Colombia) Víctor Luna (2000)
- (Colombia) Juan José Peláez (2000–02)
- (Colombia) Álvaro Escobar (interim) (2000–01)
- (Colombia) Reynaldo Rueda (2002)
- (Colombia) Víctor Luna (2002–03)
- (Colombia) Jaime Rodríguez (2003–04)
- (Colombia) Pedro Sarmiento (1 July 2004 – 30 June 2005)
- (Colombia) Javier Álvarez (2005–06)
- (Colombia) Édgar Carvajal (interim) (2006)
- (Colombia) Víctor Luna (2006–07)
- (Colombia) Juan José Peláez (2007–08)
- (Colombia) Santiago Escobar (1 December 2008 – 19 May 2009)
- (Colombia) Leonel Álvarez (19 May 2009 – 25 May 2010)
- (Colombia) Édgar Carvajal (1 May 2010 – 31 March 2011)
- (Colombia) Víctor Luna (1 April 2011 – 22 May 2011)
- (Colombia) Guillermo Berrío (30 April 2011 – 13 February 2012)
- (Colombia) Hernán Darío Gómez (13 February 2012 – 19 April 2013)
- (Colombia) Pedro Sarmiento (3 September 2013 – 21 February 2014)
- (Colombia) Hernán Torres (21 February 2014 – May 2015)
- (Colombia) Leonel Álvarez (May 2015 – December 2016)
- (Argentina) Luis Zubeldía (December 2016 – June 2017)
- (Colombia) Juan José Peláez (June 2017 – October 2017)
- (Spain) Ismael Rescalvo (December 2017 – June 2018)
- (Ecuador) (United States) Octavio Zambrano (June 2018 – April 2019)
- (Colombia) Alexis Mendoza (May 2019 – September 2019)
- (Paraguay) Aldo Bobadilla (September 2019 – September 2020)
- (Colombia) Hernán Darío Gómez (December 2020 – September 2021)
- (Uruguay) (Colombia) Julio Comesaña (September 2021 – June 2022)
- (Colombia) David González (June 2022 – May 2023)
- (Colombia) (United States) Sebastián Botero (interim) (May 2023 – July 2023)
- (Uruguay) Alfredo Arias (July 2023 – August 2024)
- (Colombia) Alejandro Restrepo (August 2024 – April 2026)
- (Colombia) (United States) Sebastián Botero (interim) (April 2026 – May 2026)

== Presidents ==
This is the list of presidents of Independiente Medellín since its foundation:

- José Luis Restrepo Jaramillo (1913–1928)
- Luis Eduardo Ramírez (1929–1933)
- Jesus Maria Burgos (1933–1938)
- Bernardo Munera A. (1940–1947)
- Federico Kahn (1948)
- Alejandro Cano (1948–1951)
- Ignacio Gómez (1953–1954)
- Javier Arriola (1954–1958)
- Alfonso Arriola (1959–1970)
- Oscar Serna Mejía (1971–1974)
- Gustavo Arbeláez (1974)
- Gabriel Toro Pérez (1975–1977)
- Oscar Serna Mejía (1978)
- Hernán Gómez Agudelo (1978–1979)
- Pablo Correa Ramos (1979–1981)
- Oscar Serna Mejía (1981)
- Héctor Mesa Gómez (1981–1983)
- Oscar Serna Mejía (1984–1985)
- Pablo Correa Ramos (1985)
- Mario de Jesus Valderrama (1986–1987)
- Gabriel Toro Pérez (1987)
- Luis Fernando Correa (1987)
- Humberto Betancur (1987–1988)
- Hernán Gómez Agudelo (1988–989)
- Antonio Mesa Escobar (1989–1991)
- Alberto Montoya Callejas (1991–1992)
- Jesús Aristizábal Guevara (1992)
- Julio Villate (1992–1995)
- Jorge Castillo (1995–1997)
- Mario de Jesus Valderrama (1998–2000)
- Javier Velásquez (2001–2005)
- Juan Guillermo Montoya (2005–2006)
- John Cardona Arteaga (2006)
- Carlos Alberto Palacio Acosta (2006–2008)
- Jorge Alberto Osorio (2008–2012)
- Julio Roberto Gómez 2012–2013
- Carlos Mario Mejía (2013–2014)
- Eduardo Silva Meluk (2014–2018)
- Michael Gil Gómez (2019)
- Jairo Vélez (2020)
- Daniel Ossa Giraldo (2021–2024)
- Juan Camilo Restrepo (2024–present)
