= Víctor Luna =

Colombian footballer (1959–2024)

Personal information
- Full name: Víctor Emilio Luna Gómez
- Date of birth: 27 October 1959
- Place of birth: Medellín, Colombia
- Date of death: 28 January 2024 (aged 64)
- Place of death: Medellín, Colombia
- Height: 1.80 m (5 ft 11 in)
- Position: Defender

Senior career*
Years	Team	Apps	(Gls)
1978–1985	Atlético Nacional		
1986–1990	América de Cali		

International career
1983–1985	Colombia	21	(0)

Managerial career
- 1992: Once Caldas
- 1997: Medellín
- 2000: Independiente Medellín
- 2002–2003: Independiente Medellín
- 2004: Barcelona Guayaquil
- 2005: Once Caldas
- 2005–2006: Macará
- 2006–2007: Medellín
- 2011: Medellín
- * Club domestic league appearances and goals

Víctor Emilio Luna Gómez (27 October 1959 – 28 January 2024) was a Colombian football player and manager. A defender, he played in 21 matches for the Colombia national team from 1983 to 1985. He was also part of Colombia's squad for the 1983 Copa América tournament. Luna died from a heart attack on 28 January 2024, at the age of 64.
