= José Vicente Grecco =

Argentine footballer and manager

Personal information
- Full name: José Vicente Grecco Robles
- Date of birth: 20 June 1929
- Place of birth: Bahía Blanca, Argentina
- Date of death: 24 August 2008 (aged 79)
- Position: Forward

Youth career
- Boca Juniors

Senior career*
Years	Team	Apps	(Gls)
1948	Boca Juniors	1	(0)
1949–1953	Unión de Santa Fe	107	(55)
–	Newell's Old Boys		
–	River Plate-UY		
1956–1958	Medellín		
1958	Santa Fe	34	(26)
1958–1959	Málaga		
1959–1960	Real Murcia		
1961–1962	Medellín		

Managerial career
- 1964–1965: Independiente Medellín
- 1975: Deportes Quindío
- * Club domestic league appearances and goals

José Vicente Grecco (20 June 1929 in Bahía Blanca – 24 August 2008 in Medellín) was an Argentine football player and manager.

== Club career ==
Grecco began his playing career in 1948 with Boca Juniors, he only played one game for the club a 3–1 defeat to Estudiantes de La Plata on 14 November 1948. He then went on to play for Unión de Santa Fe and Newell's Old Boys in the Primera División Argentina. Grecco scored 55 goals in 107 matches for Unión.

He also enjoyed success in Colombia with Independiente Medellín and Santa Fe. Grecco is Independiente Medellín's all-time leading goal scorer with 92 goals in 166 games, and he was the top goal scorer in the 1957 Fútbol Profesional Colombiano with 30 goals.

== Personal ==
Grecco died 24 August 2008 in Medellín.
