= Humberto Álvarez =

Colombian footballer (1929–2019)

Personal information
- Date of birth: 13 June 1929
- Place of birth: Medellín, Colombia
- Date of death: 9 June 2019 (aged 89)
- Place of death: Medellín, Colombia

Senior career*
Years	Team	Apps	(Gls)
- Atlético Nacional
- * Club domestic league appearances and goals

Humberto Álvarez (13 June 1929 – 9 June 2019) was a Colombian footballer who played for Atlético Nacional, with whom he won the 1954 Campeonato Profesional.
