= Luis Miloc =

Uruguayan footballer and manager (1929–1998)

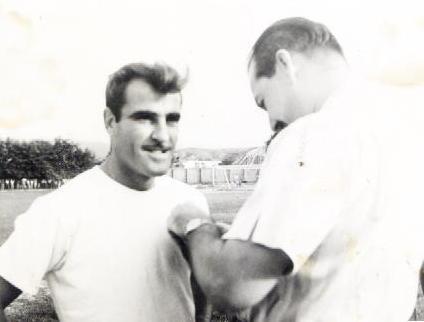
- Miloc, award for the tournament's scorer in 1960

Personal information
- Full name: Luis Alberto Miloc Pelachi
- Date of birth: 31 January 1929
- Place of birth: Montevideo, Uruguay
- Date of death: 10 November 1998 (aged 69)
- Place of death: Bogotá, Colombia
- Position: Forward

Youth career
- 1940–1945: Huracán Buceo
- 1945–1946: Nacional

Senior career*
Years	Team	Apps	(Gls)
1947–1948	Nacional		
1948	Universidad de Chile	6	(2)
1949	River Plate Montevideo		
1949	Nacional		
1950–1953	Cúcuta Deportivo		
1954	Nacional		
1955	La Salle FC		
1956–1960	Cúcuta Deportivo		
1961–1962	Santa Fe		

Managerial career
- 1968–1971: Atlético Junior
- 1972–1976: Cúcuta Deportivo
- 1977–1978: Deportivo San Cristóbal
- 1979: Girardot FC
- * Club domestic league appearances and goals

Luis Alberto Miloc Pelachi (January 31, 1929 in Montevideo, Uruguay – November 10, 1998 in Bogotá, Colombia) is a former Uruguayan footballer and manager and currently played for clubs of Uruguay, Chile, Colombia and Venezuela and managed in clubs of Colombia and Venezuela.

== Teams (Player) ==
- (Uruguay) Huracán Buceo 1940–1945
- (Uruguay) Nacional 1945–1948
- Universidad de Chile 1948
- (Uruguay) River Plate (Montevideo) 1949
- (Uruguay) Nacional 1949
- (Colombia) Cúcuta Deportivo 1950–1953
- (Uruguay) Nacional 1954
- (Venezuela) La Salle FC 1955
- (Colombia) Cúcuta Deportivo 1956–1960
- (Colombia) Independiente de Santa Fe 1961–1962

== Teams (Coach) ==
- (Colombia) Atlético Junior 1968–1971
- (Colombia) Cúcuta Deportivo 1972–1976
- (Venezuela) Deportivo San Cristóbal 1977–1978
- (Colombia) Girardot FC 1979
