= 2011 Categoría Primera A season =

Liga Postobón
- Season: 2011
- Champions: Apertura: Atlético Nacional (11th title); Finalización: Junior (7th title)
- Relegated: Deportivo Pereira; América de Cali
- 2012 Copa Libertadores: Atlético Nacional; Junior; Once Caldas
- 2012 Copa Sudamericana: Envigado; Millonarios; La Equidad
- Matches: 210
- Goals: 560 (2.67 per match)
- Top goalscorer: Apertura: Carlos Rentería (12 goals); Finalización: Carlos Bacca (12 goals)

The 2011 Categoría Primera A season (officially known at the 2011 Liga Postobón season for sponsorship reasons) is the 64th season of Colombia's top-flight football league.

== Format ==
The format for both the Apertura and Finalización will have an identical format. Each championship will be divided into four stages. The First Stage will be contested on a home-and-away basis, with each team playing the other teams once and playing a regional rival once more. The top 8 teams after 18 rounds will advance to the quarterfinals. In the quarterfinals, the teams will be matched-up with another team into four different ties. The ties will be contested over two legs on a home-and-away basis. The winner of each tie will advance to the semifinals. The semifinals and the finals will have the same format as the quarterfinals. The winner of the finals will be declared the champion.

== Teams ==
Locations of the 2011 Primera A teams

Team	City	Stadium
América	Cali	Pascual Guerrero
Atlético Huila	Neiva	Guillermo Plazas Alcid
Atlético Nacional	Medellín	Atanasio Girardot
Boyacá Chicó	Tunja	La Independencia
Cúcuta Deportivo	Cúcuta	General Santander
Deportes Quindío	Armenia	Centenario
Deportes Tolima	Ibagué	Manuel Murillo Toro
Deportivo Cali	Cali	Pascual Guerrero
Deportivo Cali	Palmira	Deportivo Cali
Deportivo Pereira	Pereira	Hernán Ramírez Villegas
Envigado	Envigado	Polideportivo Sur
Independiente Medellín	Medellín	Atanasio Girardot
Itagüí Ditaires	Itagüí	Ciudad de Itagüí
Junior	Barranquilla	Metropolitano
La Equidad	Bogotá	Metropolitano de Techo
Millonarios	Bogotá	Nemesio Camacho
Once Caldas	Manizales	Palogrande
Real Cartagena	Cartagena	Jaime Morón León
Santa Fe	Bogotá	Nemesio Camacho

== Torneo Apertura ==
The Liga Postobon I began on February 5 and ended on June 15.

=== First stage ===
The First Stage began on February 5 and ended on May 21.

==== Standings ====
Pos	Team	Pld	W	D	L	GF	GA	GD	Pts	Qualification
1	Once Caldas	18	11	3	4	32	17	+15	36	Advanced to the Quarterfinals
2	Deportes Tolima	18	10	4	4	35	21	+14	34	Advanced to the Quarterfinals
3	Atlético Nacional	18	10	3	5	33	27	+6	33	Advanced to the Quarterfinals
4	Envigado	18	8	8	2	30	21	+9	32	Advanced to the Quarterfinals
5	La Equidad	18	8	5	5	23	14	+9	29	Advanced to the Quarterfinals
6	Millonarios	18	8	4	6	31	23	+8	28	Advanced to the Quarterfinals
7	Deportivo Cali	18	8	3	7	21	24	−3	27	Advanced to the Quarterfinals
8	Cúcuta Deportivo	18	6	8	4	22	19	+3	26	Advanced to the Quarterfinals
9	Boyacá Chicó	18	8	1	9	25	24	+1	25	
10	Quindío	18	7	4	7	22	29	−7	25	
11	Itagüí	18	6	6	6	24	23	+1	24	
12	América	18	7	3	8	23	25	−2	24	
13	Real Cartagena	18	6	5	7	24	25	−1	23	
14	Santa Fe	18	5	6	7	18	22	−4	21	
15	Junior	18	5	4	9	19	28	−9	19	
16	Huila	18	4	5	9	25	36	−11	17	
17	Independiente Medellín	18	4	3	11	19	30	−11	15	
18	Deportivo Pereira	18	1	5	12	16	34	−18	8	

Rules for classification: 1st points; 2nd goal difference; 3rd goals scored; 4th away goals scored; 5th away goals against; 6th draw.

==== Results ====
Home \ Away	AME	HUI	NAC	BOY	CUC	QUI	TOL	CAL	PER	ENV	DIM	ITA	JUN	EQU	MIL	ONC	RCA	SFE
América		2–1		2–1			2–3	2–3	3–2	2–1					1–1	2–1		2–0
Huila			1–3		1–1	0–1	4–7	1–4			2–0			1–1			3–0	2–0
Atlético Nacional	3–1				3–0	2–2		2–1		2–3	1–0	3–1	4–1				0–3	
Boyacá Chicó		3–0	2–1			2–1		2–0				1–2		1–2		1–1	3–0	3–2
Cúcuta Deportivo	0–0			1–0		2–0	2–3		4–0	1–1			0–0		0–1	1–1		
Quindío	2–0				0–1			0–1	4–3	3–3	2–1	2–1	1–1				2–1	
Deportes Tolima		3–1	5–0	3–1		0–0						0–0		2–0	1–0	1–3		1–0
Deportivo Cali	0–3				1–2		0–2		2–1	3–2	0–2	1–0	1–0		0–0			
Deportivo Pereira		0–0	0–2	0–1			2–2					0–2		0–1	1–2	1–0		1–1
Envigado		1–1		2–1			0–0		1–0			2–2		0–0	2–0	2–1		3–1
Independiente Medellín	1–0		2–3	1–0	2–3		3–1		2–2	1–2			0–0		3–3			
Itagüí	1–0	3–3			1–1					1–1	2–1		3–0	2–1		0–1		2–2
Junior	1–1	3–0		1–2			1–0		2–1	1–2					3–2	1–2	2–0	
La Equidad	1–0		1–1	2–0	1–1	1–0		1–2			5–0		3–0				0–0	
Millonarios		2–3	1–2	3–1		5–0						2–1		3–2		0–2	3–0	1–1
Once Caldas		2–1	3–1			5–1		2–0	2–0		1–0			0–1			3–2	2–2
Real Cartagena	3–0				1–1		2–1	1–1	2–2	1–1	2–0	2–0	4–2					
Santa Fe			0–0		3–1	0–1		1–1			1–0		2–0	1–0	0–2		1–0	

Legend: Blue = home team win; Yellow = draw; Red = away team win.

=== Knockout round bracket ===
Quarterfinals
1	Once Caldas	0	1	1 (4)
6	Millonarios (p)	1	0	1 (5)
4	Envigado	0	1	1
5	La Equidad	1	1	2
2	Deportes Tolima	3	1	4
8	Cúcuta Deportivo	1	1	2
3	Atlético Nacional (p)	0	2	2 (4)
7	Deportivo Cali	1	1	2 (1)

Semifinals
6	Millonarios	2	1	3
5	La Equidad	2	2	4
2	Deportes Tolima	1	1	2
3	Atlético Nacional	3	0	3

Finals
5	La Equidad	2	1	3 (2)
3	Atlético Nacional (p)	1	2	3 (3)

=== Quarterfinals ===
The Quarterfinals began on May 25 and ended on May 31.

==== Quarterfinal A ====
Pos	Team	Pld	W	D	L	GF	GA	GD	Pts	Qualification
1	Millonarios	2	1	0	1	1	1	0	3	Advanced to the Semifinals
2	Once Caldas	2	1	0	1	1	1	0	3	

Rules for classification: 1st points; 2nd goal difference; 3rd penalty shoot-out.
May 26, 2011
20:45 UTC−05:00

Millonarios	1–0	Once Caldas
Candelo 19'	Report

Estadio Nemesio Camacho (El Campín), Bogotá
Referee: Ímer Machado

May 29, 2011
17:00 UTC−05:00

Once Caldas	1–0	Millonarios
Rentería 21'	Report
Penalties
Nuñez (penalty scored); Carbonero (penalty scored); Pajoy (penalty scored); Rentería (penalty missed); Moreno (penalty scored); Henriquez (penalty missed)	4–5	(penalty scored) Candelo; (penalty scored) Ramos; (penalty scored) Preciado; (penalty scored) Toloza; (penalty missed) Domínguez; (penalty scored) Tancredi

Estadio Palogrande, Manizales
Referee: Wilmar Roldán

==== Quarterfinal B ====
Pos	Team	Pld	W	D	L	GF	GA	GD	Pts	Qualification
1	Deportes Tolima	2	1	1	0	4	2	+2	4	Advanced to the Semifinals
2	Cúcuta Deportivo	2	0	1	1	2	4	−2	1	

Rules for classification: 1st points; 2nd goal difference; 3rd penalty shoot-out.
May 25, 2011
20:45 UTC−05:00

Cúcuta Deportivo	1–3	Deportes Tolima
Millán 47'	Report	Santoya 35'; Ju. Hurtado 59'; Marrugo 66'

Estadio General Santander, Cúcuta
Referee: Adrián Vélez

May 28, 2011
17:30 UTC−05:00

Deportes Tolima	1–1	Cúcuta Deportivo
Parra 90+3'	Report	Malano 1'

Estadio Manuel Murillo Toro, Ibagué
Referee: Jorge Sierra

==== Quarterfinal C ====
Pos	Team	Pld	W	D	L	GF	GA	GD	Pts	Qualification
1	Atlético Nacional	2	1	0	1	2	2	0	3	Advanced to the Semifinals
2	Deportivo Cali	2	1	0	1	2	2	0	3	

Rules for classification: 1st points; 2nd goal difference; 3rd penalty shoot-out.
May 25, 2011
19:00 UTC−05:00

Deportivo Cali	1–0	Atlético Nacional
Belalcazar 38'	Report

Estadio Deportivo Cali, Cali
Referee: Wilson Lamouroux

May 31, 2011
20:00 UTC−05:00

Atlético Nacional	2–1	Deportivo Cali
Pabón 15'; Palomino 89'	Report	Martínez 61'
Penalties
Pabón (penalty scored); Rentería (penalty scored); Aguilar (penalty scored); Patiño (penalty scored)	4–1	(penalty missed) Martínez; (penalty missed) J. Álvarez; (penalty scored) Cuellar

Estadio General Santander, Cúcuta
Referee: Francisco Peñuela

==== Quarterfinal D ====
Pos	Team	Pld	W	D	L	GF	GA	GD	Pts	Qualification
1	La Equidad	2	1	1	0	2	1	+1	4	Advanced to the Semifinals
2	Envigado	2	0	1	1	1	2	−1	1	

Rules for classification: 1st points; 2nd goal difference; 3rd penalty shoot-out.
May 26, 2011
19:00 UTC−05:00

La Equidad	1–0	Envigado
Araújo 80'	Report

Estadio Metropolitano de Techo, Bogotá
Referee: Luis Sánchez

May 29, 2011
19:00 UTC−05:00

Envigado	1–1	La Equidad
Serna 44'	Report	Mosquera 45'

Estadio Polideportivo Sur, Envigado
Referee: Héctor Parra

=== Semifinals ===
The Semifinals began on June 4 and ended on June 8.

==== Semifinal A ====
Pos	Team	Pld	W	D	L	GF	GA	GD	Pts	Qualification
1	La Equidad	2	1	1	0	4	3	+1	4	Advanced to the Finals
2	Millonarios	2	0	1	1	3	4	−1	1	

Rules for classification: 1st points; 2nd goal difference; 3rd penalty shoot-out.
June 4, 2011
18:20 UTC−05:00

Millonarios	2–2	La Equidad
Rodríguez 41'; Toloza 90+5'	Report	Polo 18'; Araújo 73'

Estadio Nemesio Camacho (El Campín), Bogotá
Referee: Óscar Ruiz

June 8, 2011
20:30 UTC−05:00

La Equidad	2–1	Millonarios
Cosme 49', 79'	Report	Toloza 86'

Estadio Metropolitano de Techo, Bogotá
Referee: Adrián Vélez

==== Semifinal B ====
Pos	Team	Pld	W	D	L	GF	GA	GD	Pts	Qualification
1	Atlético Nacional	2	1	0	1	3	2	+1	3	Advanced to the Finals
2	Deportes Tolima	2	1	0	1	2	3	−1	3	

Rules for classification: 1st points; 2nd goal difference; 3rd penalty shoot-out.
June 5, 2011
15:00 UTC−05:00

Atlético Nacional	3–1	Deportes Tolima
Pabón 17', 48'; Palomino 85'	Report	Parra 52'

Estadio Atanasio Girardot, Medellín
Referee: Luis Sánchez

June 8, 2011
18:00 UTC−05:00

Deportes Tolima	1–0	Atlético Nacional
Bustos 40'	Report

Estadio Manuel Murillo Toro, Ibagué
Referee: Francisco Peñuela

=== Finals ===
The Finals began on June 12 and ended on June 18.

Pos	Team	Pld	W	D	L	GF	GA	GD	Pts	Qualification
1	Atlético Nacional	2	1	0	1	3	3	0	3	2012 Copa Libertadores Second Stage
2	La Equidad	2	1	0	1	3	3	0	3	

Rules for classification: 1st points; 2nd goal difference; 3rd penalty shoot-out.
June 12, 2011
17:30 UTC−05:00

La Equidad	2–1	Atlético Nacional
Núñez 44'; Rivas 62'	Report	Rentería 6'

Estadio Metropolitano de Techo, Bogotá
Referee: Albert Duarte

June 18, 2011
18:30 UTC−05:00

Atlético Nacional	2–1	La Equidad
Pabón 43', 79'	Report	Polo 90+2'
Penalties
Pabón (penalty scored); Torres (penalty missed); Aguilar (penalty scored); Patiño (penalty scored)	3–2	(penalty missed) Polo; (penalty missed) Cosme; (penalty scored) Mosquera; (penalty scored) Yanes; (penalty missed) Araújo

Estadio Atanasio Girardot, Medellín
Referee: Ímer Machado

=== Top goalscorers ===
Rank	Player	Nationality	Club	Goals
1	Carlos Rentería	Colombian	Atlético Nacional	12
2	Dorlan Pabón	Colombian	Atlético Nacional	11
2	Edison Toloza	Colombian	Millonarios	11
4	Wason Rentería	Colombian	Once Caldas	10
5	Wilder Medina	Colombian	Deportes Tolima	9

== Torneo Finalización ==
The Liga Postobon II began on August 27 and is scheduled to end on December 21.

=== First stage ===
The First Stage began on August 27 and ended on November 27.

==== Standings ====
Pos	Team	Pld	W	D	L	GF	GA	GD	Pts	Qualification
1	Junior	18	8	7	3	28	22	+6	31	Advanced to the Quarterfinals
2	Itagüí	18	8	6	4	24	18	+6	30	Advanced to the Quarterfinals
3	Once Caldas	18	8	5	5	34	23	+11	29	Advanced to the Quarterfinals
4	Millonarios	18	8	4	6	21	17	+4	28	Advanced to the Quarterfinals
5	Santa Fe	18	8	4	6	22	19	+3	28	Advanced to the Quarterfinals
6	Envigado	18	8	4	6	20	18	+2	28	Advanced to the Quarterfinals
7	Boyacá Chicó	18	6	9	3	19	16	+3	27	Advanced to the Quarterfinals
8	América	18	7	4	7	22	24	−2	25	Advanced to the Quarterfinals
9	Quindío	18	7	4	7	23	26	−3	25	
10	Deportivo Pereira	18	5	9	4	23	16	+7	24	
11	Deportivo Cali	18	6	5	7	15	20	−5	23	
12	Atlético Nacional	18	5	7	6	24	23	+1	22	
13	Independiente Medellín	18	6	4	8	26	28	−2	22	
14	Huila	18	6	4	8	20	22	−2	22	
15	Deportes Tolima	18	6	4	8	21	25	−4	22	
16	Real Cartagena	18	5	4	9	21	25	−4	19	
17	La Equidad	18	3	7	8	12	22	−10	16	
18	Cúcuta Deportivo	18	2	9	7	17	28	−11	15	

Rules for classification: 1st points; 2nd goal difference; 3rd goals scored; 4th away goals scored; 5th away goals against; 6th draw.

==== Results ====
Home \ Away	AME	HUI	NAC	BOY	CUC	QUI	TOL	CAL	PER	ENV	DIM	ITA	JUN	EQU	MIL	ONC	RCA	SFE
América			2–4		3–0	1–0		0–1			1–2	2–1	0–1	1–1			2–1	
Huila	1–2			1–1			1–0		1–1	1–0		1–1	2–3		2–1	1–0		
Atlético Nacional		1–2		1–1			3–2		2–2		1–1			1–2	0–2	2–1		1–1
Boyacá Chicó	1–1				1–1		1–0		1–2	0–0	0–0		3–0	1–0	1–0			
Cúcuta Deportivo		1–0	0–0			1–1		0–1			1–2	1–1		0–0			3–2	0–1
Quindío		2–1	2–1	2–2	3–3		2–1							1–1	3–0	2–0		3–1
Deportes Tolima	1–4	1–0			2–1			3–1	1–0	1–2	2–0		0–0				1–0	
Deportivo Cali	2–0	1–2	2–1	2–2		1–0								0–0		1–1	1–0	0–0
Deportivo Pereira	1–1				2–1	3–0		0–0		4–0	2–2		1–2			2–3	0–0	
Envigado	1–1		1–3		1–1	1–0		1–0			1–0	2–0	2–0				2–0	
Independiente Medellín		3–2	0–2			1–2		3–0				0–3 (Note: DIMAYOR awarded a 3–0 away win in favor of Itagüí Ditaires for Independiente Medellin fielding an unauthorized player. Original result was a 1–0 win for Independiente Medellin.)		0–1		3–4	4–1	1–0
Itagüí			1–0	1–1		1–0	2–2	2–1	1–0	1–1					2–1		3–1	
Junior			1–1		2–2	4–0		2–0			4–3	0–0		3–0			0–3	3–3
La Equidad		1–1		0–1			1–1		0–2	0–2		0–2			1–2	1–1		2–1
Millonarios	2–0				1–1		2–1	3–1	0–0	1–0	1–1		0–0					2–0
Once Caldas	4–0			3–1	5–0		2–2		1–1	3–2		2–0	1–2		0–1			
Real Cartagena		2–1	0–0	0–1		3–0							1–1	2–1	3–2	1–1		1–2
Santa Fe	0–1	1–0		2–0			3–0		0–0	2–1		3–2			1–0	1–2		

Legend: Blue = home team win; Yellow = draw; Red = away team win.
Notes:

Quarterfinals
1	Junior	0	2	2
7	Boyacá Chicó	0	2	2
4	Millonarios (p)	2	1	3 (7)
6	Envigado	1	2	3 (6)
2	Itagüí	2	0	2
5	Santa Fe	3	1	4
3	Once Caldas	0	2	2
8	América	0	0	0

Semifinals
1	Junior (p)	0	3	3 (5)
4	Millonarios	3	0	3 (4)
5	Santa Fe	1	1	2
3	Once Caldas	1	2	3

Finals
1	Junior (p)	3	1	4 (4)
3	Once Caldas	2	2	4 (2)

=== Quarterfinals ===
The Quarterfinals began on December 3 and ended on December 8.

==== Quarterfinal A ====
Pos	Team	Pld	W	D	L	GF	GA	GD	Pts	Qualification
1	Junior	2	0	2	0	2	2	0	2	Advanced to the Semifinals
2	Boyacá Chicó	2	0	2	0	2	2	0	1	

Rules for classification: 1st points; 2nd goal difference; 3rd penalty shoot-out.
December 3, 2011
20:00 UTC−05:00

Boyacá Chicó	0–0	Junior
	Report

Estadio La Independencia, Tunja
Referee: Adrian Vélez

December 8, 2011
15:30 UTC−05:00

Junior	2–2	Boyacá Chicó
Bacca 52' (pen.); Hernández 66'	Report	Mostasilla 3'; Correa 11'

Estadio Metropolitano Roberto Meléndez, Barranquilla
Referee: Sebastián Restrepo

==== Quarterfinal B ====
Pos	Team	Pld	W	D	L	GF	GA	GD	Pts	Qualification
1	Santa Fe	2	2	0	0	4	2	+2	6	Advanced to the Semifinals
2	Itagüí	2	0	0	2	2	4	−2	0	

Rules for classification: 1st points; 2nd goal difference; 3rd penalty shoot-out.
December 4, 2011
17:30 UTC−05:00

Santa Fe	3–2	Itagüí Ditaires
Anchico 38', 60'; Bernal 80'	Report	Alzate 12', 57'

Estadio Nemesio Camacho (El Campín), Bogotá
Referee: Luis Sánchez

December 8, 2011
15:30 UTC−05:00

Itagüí Ditaires	0–1	Santa Fe
	Report	Pérez 41'

Estadio Metropolitano Ciudad de Itagüí, Itagüí
Referee: Ímer Machado

==== Quarterfinal C ====
Pos	Team	Pld	W	D	L	GF	GA	GD	Pts	Qualification
1	Once Caldas	2	1	1	0	2	0	+2	4	Advanced to the Semifinals
2	América	2	0	1	1	0	2	−2	1	

Rules for classification: 1st points; 2nd goal difference; 3rd penalty shoot-out.
December 3, 2011
18:23 UTC−05:00

América	0–0	Once Caldas
	Report

Estadio Olímpico Pascual Guerrero, Cali
Referee: Ramiro Suárez

December 8, 2011
17:30 UTC−05:00

Once Caldas	2–0	América
Amaya 83'; Del Valle 86'	Report

Estadio Palogrande, Manizales
Referee: Wilmar Roldán

==== Quarterfinal D ====
Pos	Team	Pld	W	D	L	GF	GA	GD	Pts	Qualification
1	Millonarios	2	1	0	1	3	3	0	3	Advanced to the Semifinals
2	Envigado	2	1	0	1	3	3	0	3	

Rules for classification: 1st points; 2nd goal difference; 3rd penalty shoot-out.
December 4, 2011
15:30 UTC−05:00

Envigado	2–1	Millonarios
Córdoba 12'; Morantes 45'	Report	Ochoa 61'

Estadio Polideportivo Sur, Envigado
Referee: Wilson Lamouroux

December 8, 2011
17:30 UTC−05:00

Millonarios	2–1	Envigado
Cichero 9'; Morantes 51'	Report	Vásquez 25'
Penalties
Candelo (penalty scored); Ramos (penalty scored); Carpintero (penalty missed); Robayo (penalty scored); Toloza (penalty scored); Ortiz (penalty scored); Angulo (penalty scored); Mera (penalty scored)	7–6	(penalty missed) Morantes; (penalty scored) Quintero; (penalty scored) Diaz; (penalty scored) Pérez; (penalty scored) Serna; (penalty scored) Angulo; (penalty scored) Mosquera; (penalty missed) Gonzales

Estadio Nemesio Camacho (El Campín), Bogotá
Referee: Jorge Sierra

=== Semifinals ===
The Semifinals began on December 11 and ended on December 15.

==== Semifinal A ====
Pos	Team	Pld	W	D	L	GF	GA	GD	Pts	Qualification
1	Once Caldas	2	1	1	0	3	2	+1	4	Advanced to the Finals
2	Santa Fe	2	0	1	1	2	3	−1	1	

Rules for classification: 1st points; 2nd goal difference; 3rd penalty shoot-out.
December 11, 2011
15:30 UTC−05:00

Once Caldas	1–1	Santa Fe
Moreno Mora 41'	Report	Pérez 50'

Estadio Palogrande, Manizales
Referee: Wilson Lamouroux

December 15, 2011
11:00 UTC−05:00

Santa Fe	1–2	Once Caldas
Rodas 17'	Report	Núñez 43'; Pajoy 52'

Estadio Nemesio Camacho (El Campín), Bogotá
Referee: Adrian Vélez

Note: This match was originally scheduled for December 14, but was postponed due to heavy rain.

==== Semifinal B ====
Pos	Team	Pld	W	D	L	GF	GA	GD	Pts	Qualification
1	Junior	2	1	0	1	3	3	0	3	Advanced to the Finals
2	Millonarios	2	1	0	1	3	3	0	3	

Rules for classification: 1st points; 2nd goal difference; 3rd penalty shoot-out.
December 11, 2011
17:30 UTC−05:00

Millonarios	3–0	Junior
Moreno 15', 64'; Candelo 70'	Report

Estadio Nemesio Camacho (El Campín), Bogotá
Referee: Wilmar Roldan

December 14, 2011
UTC−05:00

Junior	3–0	Millonarios
Valencia 13'; V. Hernández 27'; G. Hernández 65'	Report
Penalties
G. Hernández (penalty scored); García (penalty scored); Cardenas (penalty scored); Cortés (penalty scored); Bacca (penalty scored)	5–4	(penalty missed) Candelo; (penalty scored) Ramos; (penalty scored) Franco; (penalty scored) Robayo; (penalty scored) Toloza

Estadio Metropolitano Roberto Meléndez, Barranquilla
Referee: Luis Sanchez

=== Finals ===
Pos	Team	Pld	W	D	L	GF	GA	GD	Pts	Qualification
1	Junior	2	1	0	1	4	4	0	3	2012 Copa Libertadores Second Stage
2	Once Caldas	2	1	0	1	4	4	0	3	

Rules for classification: 1st points; 2nd goal difference; 3rd penalty shoot-out.
December 18, 2011
17:30 UTC−05:00

Junior	3–2	Once Caldas
Bacca 44' (pen.), 57' (pen.); V. Hernández 53'	Report	Núñez 19', 40'

Estadio Metropolitano Roberto Meléndez, Barranquilla
Referee: Ímer Machado

December 21, 2011
19:00 UTC−05:00

Once Caldas	2–1	Junior
Pajoy 45'; Beltrán 69'	Report	Bacca 58'
Penalties
	2–4

Estadio Palogrande, Manizales
Referee: Wilmar Roldán

=== Top goalscorers ===
Rank	Player	Nationality	Club	Goals
1	Carlos Bacca	Colombian	Junior	12
2	Germán Cano	Argentine	Deportivo Pereira	10
2	John Pajoy	Colombian	Once Caldas	10
2	Lionard Pajoy	Colombian	Itagüí Ditaires	10
5	Edison Toloza	Colombian	Millonarios	9

== Aggregate table ==
Pos	Team	Pld	W	D	L	GF	GA	GD	Pts	Qualification
1	Once Caldas	44	23	10	11	76	47	+29	79	2012 Copa Libertadores First Stage
2	Millonarios	44	19	9	16	62	51	+11	66	2012 Copa Sudamericana First Stage (Note: Millonarios is qualified as the 2011 Copa Colombia champion.)
3	Envigado	40	17	13	10	54	44	+10	64	2012 Copa Sudamericana First Stage
4	Atlético Nacional	42	18	10	14	65	57	+8	64	2012 Copa Libertadores Second Stage (Note: Atlético Nacional and Junior are qualified as the 2011 Apertura and 2011 Finalización champions, respectively.)
5	Deportes Tolima	40	18	9	13	62	51	+11	63	2012 Copa Sudamericana First Stage
6	Junior	42	15	13	14	56	59	−3	58	2012 Copa Libertadores Second Stage
7	La Equidad	42	14	14	14	44	43	+1	56	2012 Copa Sudamericana First Stage
8	Santa Fe	40	15	11	14	46	46	0	56	
9	Itagüí	38	14	12	12	50	44	+6	54	
10	Boyacá Chicó	38	14	12	12	46	42	+4	53 (Note: Boyacá Chicó received a one-point deduction for a fan launching a projectile at an assistant referee in a game vs. Junior.)	
11	Deportivo Cali	38	15	8	15	38	46	−8	53	
12	Quindío	36	14	8	14	45	55	−10	50	
13	América	38	14	8	16	45	51	−6	50	
14	Real Cartagena	36	11	9	16	45	50	−5	42	
15	Cúcuta Deportivo	38	8	18	12	41	51	−10	42	
16	Huila	36	10	9	17	45	58	−13	39	
17	Independiente Medellín	36	10	7	19	45	58	−13	37	
18	Deportivo Pereira	36	6	14	16	39	50	−11	32	

Rules for classification: 1st points; 2nd goal difference; 3rd goals scored; 4th away goals scored; 5th away goals against; 6th draw.

== Relegation ==
Pos	Team	Pld	GF	GA	GD	Pts	Avg	Relegation
1	Deportes Tolima	108	173	122	+51	187	1.731	
2	Once Caldas	108	178	143	+35	171	1.583	
3	Santa Fe	108	142	126	+16	165	1.528	
4	Atlético Nacional	108	147	141	+6	159	1.472	
5	Deportivo Cali	108	148	136	+12	157	1.454	
6	Junior	108	161	138	+23	156	1.444	
7	Boyacá Chicó	108	141	143	−2	156	1.444	
8	La Equidad	108	124	126	−2	150	1.389	
9	Atlético Huila	108	151	158	−7	147	1.361	
10	Independiente Medellín	108	143	144	−1	143	1.324	
11	Millonarios	108	139	134	+5	140	1.296	
12	Deportes Quindío	108	123	151	−28	138	1.278	
13	Real Cartagena	108	139	159	−20	137	1.269	
14	Cúcuta Deportivo	108	108	120	−12	135	1.25	
15	Envigado	108	149	167	−18	134	1.241	
16	Itagüí Ditaires	108	135	142	−7	132	1.222	
17	América	108	132	150	−18	127	1.176	Relegation/Promotion Playoff
18	Deportivo Pereira	108	121	134	−13	112	1.037	Relegated to the Categoría Primera B

Rules for classification: 1st average; 2nd goal difference; 3rd number of goals scored; 4th away goals scored.

=== Relegation/promotion playoff ===
As the second worst team in the relegation table, América played a two-legged tie against Patriotas, the 2011 Categoría Primera B runner-up. As the Primera A team, América played the second leg at home. The winner was determined by points, followed by goal difference, then a penalty shootout. Patriotas won the series in a penalty shootout to relegate América to the Primera B.

Teams			Scores		Tie-breakers	
Team 1	Points	Team 2	1st leg	2nd leg	GD	Pen.
América	2:2	Patriotas	1–1	1–1	0:0	3:4
