= Vladimir Hernández =

Colombian footballer (born 1989)

Personal information
- Full name: Vladimir Javier Hernández Rivera
- Date of birth: 8 February 1989 (age 37)
- Place of birth: Arauca, Colombia
- Height: 1.60 m (5 ft 3 in)
- Position: Winger

Team information
- Current team: Boyacá Chicó
- Number: 16

Youth career
- Mundialito 90
- 2000–2006: Atlético Junior

Senior career*
Years	Team	Apps	(Gls)
2007	Barranquilla	25	(4)
2008–2016	Atlético Junior	307	(61)
2017	Santos	14	(1)
2018–2021	Atlético Nacional	133	(26)
2021–2022	Independiente Medellín	80	(8)
2023–2024	Atlético Junior	53	(4)
2024	Santa Fe	1	(0)
2025–	Boyacá Chicó	23	(0)

International career^{‡}
2017–2021	Colombia	1	(0)
- * Club domestic league appearances and goals as of 12 December 2025 ‡ National team caps and goals as of 25 January 2017

Vladimir Javier Hernández Rivera (born 8 February 1989) is a Colombian footballer who plays for Boyacá Chicó. Mainly a left winger, he can also play as a forward or an attacking midfielder.

== Club career ==
=== Early career ===
Born in Arauca, Hernández was bought by Junior in 2000 at the age of 11, while playing for lowly amateurs Mundialito 90. He played for the youth setup before being assigned to the club's reserve team, Barranquilla, in 2007.

=== Atlético Junior ===
In 2008, after contributing with 25 appearances and four goals during the previous campaign, Hernández was called up by first team manager Julio Avelino Comesaña. He made his Categoría Primera A debut on 13 September of that year, in a 1–0 home win against Millonarios. He was handed his first start for the Tiburones eight days later, in a 1–0 home success over Envigado.

Hernández only scored his first professional goal on 21 June 2009, netting the equalizer in a 2–2 away draw against Deportivo Cali. He became a regular starter in the 2010 season, contributing with 22 matches and one goal as his side was crowned champions of the Apertura tournament. He scored five goals in the following year, also lifting the Clausura.

Hernández scored his first Copa Libertadores goal on 23 February 2012, netting his team's first in a 2–2 draw at Universidad Católica. He featured regularly, appearing in five matches in a group stage exit.

Hernández scored his first professional brace on 31 August 2015, in a 3–1 home win against Deportivo Cali. He netted ten league goals in the campaign, also being a winner of Copa Colombia.

=== Santos ===
On 13 October 2016, Santos' president Modesto Roma Júnior confirmed the signing of Hernández prior to the 2017 campaign. The rumoured fee was believed to be US$ 1 million.

After scoring a bicycle kick goal in a 5–1 friendly home routing of KAC Kénitra, Hernández made his official debut for the club on 9 March 2017 by replacing Vitor Bueno in a 1–1 Copa Libertadores away draw against Sporting Cristal. He first appeared as a starter on 12 March of the same year, providing two assists in a 4–1 away routing of São Bernardo FC.

Hernández made his Série A debut on 14 May 2017; after coming on for Vitor Bueno, he scored his side's second goal in a 3–2 away loss against Fluminense.

=== Atlético Nacional ===
On 19 January 2018, Hernández was announced at Atlético Nacional back in his homeland.

== International career ==
Hernández was called up for the training session of the Colombia national football team, between 14 and 18 February 2016 in Bogotá. He was also named in Colombia's provisional squad for Copa América Centenario but was cut from the final squad.

Hernández made his full international debut on 25 January 2017, replacing Santos teammate Jonathan Copete in a 1–0 friendly loss against Brazil.

== Career statistics ==
=== Club ===
As of 4 December 2018

Club	Season	League			Cup		Continental		Other		Total	
Club	Season	Division	Apps	Goals	Apps	Goals	Apps	Goals	Apps	Goals	Apps	Goals
Barranquilla	2007	Categoría Primera B	25	4	0	0	—		—		25	4
Atlético Junior	2008	Categoría Primera A	9	0	0	0	0	0	—		9	0
Atlético Junior	2009	Categoría Primera A	2	1	0	0	0	0	—		2	1
Atlético Junior	2010	Categoría Primera A	22	1	0	0	0	0	—		22	1
Atlético Junior	2011	Categoría Primera A	27	5	8	0	1 (Note: Appearance(s) in Copa Libertadores)	0	—		36	5
Atlético Junior	2012	Categoría Primera A	30	4	1	0	5	2	2 (Note: Appearance(s) in Superliga Colombiana)	0	38	6
Atlético Junior	2013	Categoría Primera A	32	3	3	1	—		—		35	4
Atlético Junior	2014	Categoría Primera A	34	4	13	0	—		—		47	4
Atlético Junior	2015	Categoría Primera A	41	10	11	2	4 (Note: Appearance(s) in Copa Sudamericana)	2	—		56	14
Atlético Junior	2016	Categoría Primera A	41	17	6	2	8	0	—		51	17
Atlético Junior	Subtotal		238	45	44	6	18	4	2	0	302	55
Santos	2017	Série A	14	1	2	0	6	0	5 (Note: Appearance(s) in Campeonato Paulista)	0	27	1
Atlético Nacional	2018	Categoría Primera A	34	5	4	1	8	2	1	0	47	8
Career total			311	55	50	7	32	6	8	0	401	68

=== International ===
As of 25 January 2017

Colombia
Year	Apps	Goals
2017	1	0
Total	1	0

== Honours ==
Junior

- Categoría Primera A (3): 2010-I, 2011-II, 2023-II
- Copa Colombia (1): 2015

Atlético Nacional

- Copa Colombia (1): 2021
