= Macnelly Torres =

Colombian footballer (born 1984)

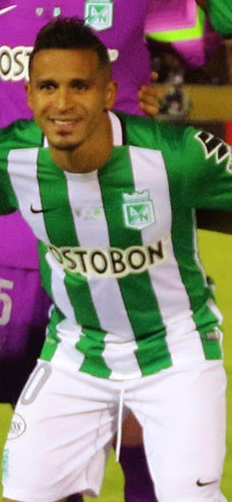
- Torres with Atlético Nacional in 2016

Personal information
- Full name: Macnelly Torres Berrío
- Date of birth: 1 November 1984 (age 42)
- Place of birth: Barranquilla, Colombia
- Height: 1.75 m (5 ft 9 in)
- Position: Attacking midfielder

Youth career
- 1994–2001: Junior

Senior career*
| Years | Team | Apps | (Gls) |
| 2002–2005 | Junior | 70 | (11) |
| 2005–2008 | Cúcuta | 62 | (0) |
| 2008–2011 | Colo-Colo | 81 | (15) |
| 2011–2013 | Atlético Nacional | 79 | (13) |
| 2011 | → San Luis (loan) | 16 | (1) |
| 2013–2014 | Al Shabab | 22 | (1) |
| 2015 | Junior | 19 | (2) |
| 2015–2018 | Atlético Nacional | 90 | (14) |
| 2018 | Deportivo Cali | 13 | (1) |
| 2019 | Libertad | 22 | (2) |
| 2020 | Alianza Petrolera | 9 | (1) |
| Total | | 483 | (61) |

International career
| 2003 | Colombia U20 | 5 | (0) |
| 2005–2017 | Colombia | 48 | (4) |
- * Club domestic league appearances and goals as of 18:19, 19 May 2021 (UTC)

Macnelly Torres Berrío (born 1 November 1984) is a former Colombian footballer former professional footballer who played mainly as an attacking midfielder.

A playmaker and known for his technical abilities with the ball he was able to win 16 titles during his 18 years of career.

Torres made his debut for Colombia in 2007 and has scored 4 goals in 48 appearances for the country.

== Club career ==
=== Early career ===
Torres joined Atlético Junior's youth system at age 10 until he made his debut as a professional in 2002. In the 2004 season Junior won the Finalización Tournament, which was his first professional title in his career. Macnelly was part of a "golden generation" for Junior, also including players like Martín Arzuaga and Omar Sebastián Pérez.

In 2005, he moved to Cúcuta Deportivo. He played a key role in the 2006 Finalización, helping the club secure its first-ever title and scoring in the second leg of the finals against Deportes Tolima.

He also participated in the 2007 Copa Libertadores, where he scored a goal against Uruguay's Nacional to help Cúcuta qualify for the semifinals, which they lost to the eventual champions Boca Juniors.

=== Colo-Colo ===
In June 2008, Torres officially joined Chilean powerhouse Colo-Colo for a fee of $2,200,000, becoming the club's most expensive signing at the time. He arrived as a replacement for his compatriot Giovanni Hernández, who signed for Junior. In November 2008, it was reported that Atletico Nacional were going to offer $3,000,000 for him, but Colo-Colo said he was not up for sale and offered a minimum of $4,500,000 for the player, more than double what he was bought for.

Torres won two league titles with the club: the 2008 Clausura and the 2009 Clausura, notably scoring twice in a match against La Serena in route to the 2009 title. On 3 March 2009, Torres had a great performance in a 3–1 victory against Palmeiras at Estádio Palestra Itália, scoring once and providing an assist. Despite the important victory, Colo-Colo failed to progress out of the 2009 Copa Libertadores group stage.

On 31 January 2010, in the league's second matchday, Torres scored and provided an assist in a 3–1 victory against Cobreloa. In the following matchday, he provided two assists to Ezequiel Miralles in a 3–0 victory against Santiago Wanderers.

In January 2011, Torres requested to leave the club.

=== Atlético Nacional ===
In January 2011, after rejecting a move to Brazilian club Vasco, he moved back to his home country and signed for Atlético Nacional on a one-year loan with an option to buy. With the club, he won the 2011 and 2013 Apertura, as well as the 2012 Copa Colombia. He also a brief loan spell after the 2011 Apertura to San Luis of the Liga MX.

=== Al Shabab ===
Shortly after winning the 2013 Apertura title with Nacional, Torres moved to the Middle East and signed with Saudi Arabian club Al Shabab for a fee of $4.5 million. He played one season with the Saudi club, where he scored once in 22 league appearances. He left the club in a controversial way, after sending a complaint to FIFA because he was denied his salary payment for five months.

=== Return to Junior ===
Torres returned to Junior in 2015, which was the club where he made his professional debut in 2001. He played the Apertura season with the club, while making 19 appearances and scoring 2 goals as Junior were eliminated in the quarter-finals by Independiente Medellin.

=== Return to Atletico Nacional ===
In June 2015, Torres returned to Nacional and signed a three-year contract with the club. In December 2015, he won his first title with the club, the 2015 Finalizacion. He won the 2016 Copa Libertadores with Nacional, and scored an important goal against Rosario Central in the quarter-finals, while being named in the squad of the tournament. Also that year, he was part of the squad that beat Junior to win the 2016 Copa Colombia. He added two more titles in 2017: the Recopa Sudamericana in April, and the 2017 Apertura title in June.

=== Deportivo Cali ===
In July 2018, Torres signed for Deportivo Cali, and played the 2018 Finalización season with them.

=== Libertad ===
In December 2018, a Club Libertad director commented that the club's coach, Leonel Alvarez, who is also Colombian just like Torres, wanted to bring the player to the club. A few days later, the transfer was confirmed and Torres signed for the Paraguayan club on a two-year contract. In addition, a release clause of $500,000 was set. He joined fellow Colombian Alexander Mejía at the club, who was his former teammate at Atlético Nacional. He won the 2019 Copa Paraguay with the club. In January 2020, the club decided to terminate his contract, mainly due to the number of injuries he had and performing below the expectations.

=== Alianza Petrolera ===
In February 2020, the Colombian player returned to his home country, this time to Alianza Petrolera. In December 2020 he left the club, citing injuries and COVID-19 as the reasons.

On 22 December 2021, after a year of inactivity, he announced his retirement.

== International career ==
Torres was part of the Colombia U-20 squad that reached the semi-finals of the 2003 FIFA World Youth Championship. He played 5 games.

Torres made his international debut in a friendly against Guatemala on 17 June 2005. He was part of the Colombia squad at the 2005 Gold Cup.Torres also played in all of Colombia's group games at the 2007 Copa America.

His decision to make the move to Saudi Arabia was publicly criticized by former Colombian midfielder Carlos Valderrama, as it was considered to be the reason why he wasn't selected for the 2014 World Cup squad. Despite not being selected, he was still called up to dispute the 2014 World Cup qualifying matches against Ecuador and Uruguay in September, as well as Colombia's last two matches against Chile and Paraguay, all while playing for Al-Shabab.

== Personal life ==
Torres' first name, Macnelly, was given to him by his father after a baseball star he admired.

== Career statistics ==
=== Club ===
Appearances and goals by club, season and competition
| Club | Season | League | | | Cup | | Continental | | Other | | Total | |
| Club | Season | Division | Apps | Goals | Apps | Goals | Apps | Goals | Apps | Goals | Apps | Goals |
|---|---|---|---|---|---|---|---|---|---|---|---|---|
| Junior | 2003 | Categoría Primera A | 19 | 0 | — | | — | | — | | 19 | 0 |
| Junior | 2004 | Categoría Primera A | 28 | 2 | — | | 3 | 0 | — | | 31 | 2 |
| Junior | 2005 | Categoría Primera A | 23 | 9 | — | | 5 | 0 | — | | 28 | 9 |
| Junior | Total | | 70 | 11 | — | | 8 | 0 | — | | 78 | 11 |
| Cúcuta | 2006 | Categoría Primera A | 15 | 0 | — | | — | | — | | 15 | 0 |
| Cúcuta | 2007 | Categoría Primera A | 33 | 0 | — | | 12 | 1 | — | | 45 | 1 |
| Cúcuta | 2008 | Categoría Primera A | 14 | 0 | 8 | 0 | 8 | 1 | — | | 30 | 1 |
| Cúcuta | Total | | 62 | 0 | 8 | 0 | 20 | 2 | — | | 90 | 2 |
| Colo-Colo | 2008 | Chilean Primera División | 24 | 6 | 1 | 0 | — | | — | | 25 | 6 |
| Colo-Colo | 2009 | Chilean Primera División | 30 | 5 | 1 | 0 | 6 | 1 | — | | 37 | 6 |
| Colo-Colo | 2010 | Chilean Primera División | 27 | 4 | 2 | 1 | 8 | 0 | — | | 37 | 5 |
| Colo-Colo | Total | | 81 | 15 | 4 | 1 | 14 | 1 | — | | 99 | 17 |
| Atlético Nacional | 2011 | Categoría Primera A | 23 | 5 | 1 | 0 | — | | — | | 24 | 5 |
| Atlético Nacional | 2012 | Categoría Primera A | 36 | 4 | 8 | 2 | 8 | 0 | 2 | 0 | 54 | 6 |
| Atlético Nacional | 2013 | Categoría Primera A | 20 | 4 | 0 | 0 | 0 | 0 | — | | 20 | 4 |
| Atlético Nacional | Total | | 79 | 13 | 9 | 2 | 8 | 0 | 2 | 0 | 98 | 15 |
| San Luis (loan) | 2011–12 | Mexican Primera División | 16 | 1 | — | | — | | — | | 16 | 1 |
| Al Shabab | 2013–14 | Saudi Pro League | 22 | 1 | 3 | 0 | 8 | 0 | 2 | 0 | 35 | 1 |
| Junior | 2015 | Categoría Primera A | 19 | 2 | — | | — | | — | | 19 | 2 |
| Atlético Nacional | 2015 | Categoría Primera A | 19 | 0 | 2 | 0 | — | | — | | 21 | 0 |
| Atlético Nacional | 2016 | Categoría Primera A | 21 | 9 | 1 | 0 | 20 | 1 | 2 | 1 | 44 | 11 |
| Atlético Nacional | 2017 | Categoría Primera A | 32 | 4 | 2 | 0 | 5 | 1 | 4 | 1 | 43 | 6 |
| Atlético Nacional | 2018 | Categoría Primera A | 18 | 1 | — | | 4 | 1 | — | | 22 | 2 |
| Atlético Nacional | Total | | 90 | 14 | 5 | 0 | 29 | 3 | 6 | 2 | 130 | 19 |
| Deportivo Cali | 2018 | Categoría Primera A | 13 | 1 | 1 | 0 | 3 | 0 | — | | 17 | 1 |
| Libertad | 2019 | Paraguayan Primera División | 22 | 2 | — | | 1 | 0 | — | | 23 | 2 |
| Alianza Petrolera | 2020 | Categoría Primera A | 9 | 1 | 1 | 0 | — | | — | | 10 | 1 |
| Career total | | | 483 | 61 | 31 | 3 | 91 | 6 | 10 | 2 | 615 | 72 |

=== International ===
Appearances and goals by national team and year
| National team | Year | Apps | Goals |
|---|---|---|---|
| Colombia | 2005 | 2 | 0 |
| Colombia | 2007 | 11 | 0 |
| Colombia | 2008 | 7 | 0 |
| Colombia | 2009 | 4 | 2 |
| Colombia | 2012 | 4 | 0 |
| Colombia | 2013 | 9 | 1 |
| Colombia | 2014 | 1 | 0 |
| Colombia | 2015 | 3 | 0 |
| Colombia | 2016 | 5 | 1 |
| Colombia | 2017 | 2 | 0 |
| Total | | 48 | 4 |

Scores and results list Peru's goal tally first, score column indicates score after each Farfán goal.

List of international goals scored by Jefferson Farfán
| No. | Date | Venue | Opponent | Score | Result | Competition | Ref. |
|---|---|---|---|---|---|---|---|
| 1 | 11 February 2009 | Estadio Hernán Ramírez Villegas, Pereira, Colombia | Haiti | 2–0 | 2–0 | Friendly | |
| 2 | 28 March 2009 | Estadio El Campín, Bogotá, Colombia | Bolivia | 1–0 | 2–0 | 2010 FIFA World Cup qualification | |
| 3 | 22 March 2013 | Estadio Metropolitano Roberto Meléndez, Barranquilla, Colombia | Bolivia | 1–0 | 5–0 | 2014 FIFA World Cup qualification | |
| 4 | 1 September 2016 | Estadio Metropolitano Roberto Meléndez, Barranquilla, Colombia | Venezuela | 2–0 | 2–0 | 2018 FIFA World Cup qualification | |

== Honours ==
Atlético Junior

- Categoría Primera A: 2004 Finalización

Cúcuta Deportivo

- Categoría Primera A: 2006 Finalización

Colo-Colo

- Primera División de Chile: 2008 Clausura, 2009 Clausura

Atlético Nacional

- Categoría Primera A: 2011 Apertura, 2013 Apertura, 2015 Clausura, 2017 Apertura
- Copa Colombia: 2012, 2016
- Superliga Colombiana: 2012
- Copa Libertadores: 2016
- Recopa Sudamericana: 2017

Al-Shabab Riyadh

- King Cup of Champions: 2014

Club Libertad

- Copa Paraguay: 2019
