= Omar Pérez (Argentine footballer) =

Argentine footballer (born 1981)

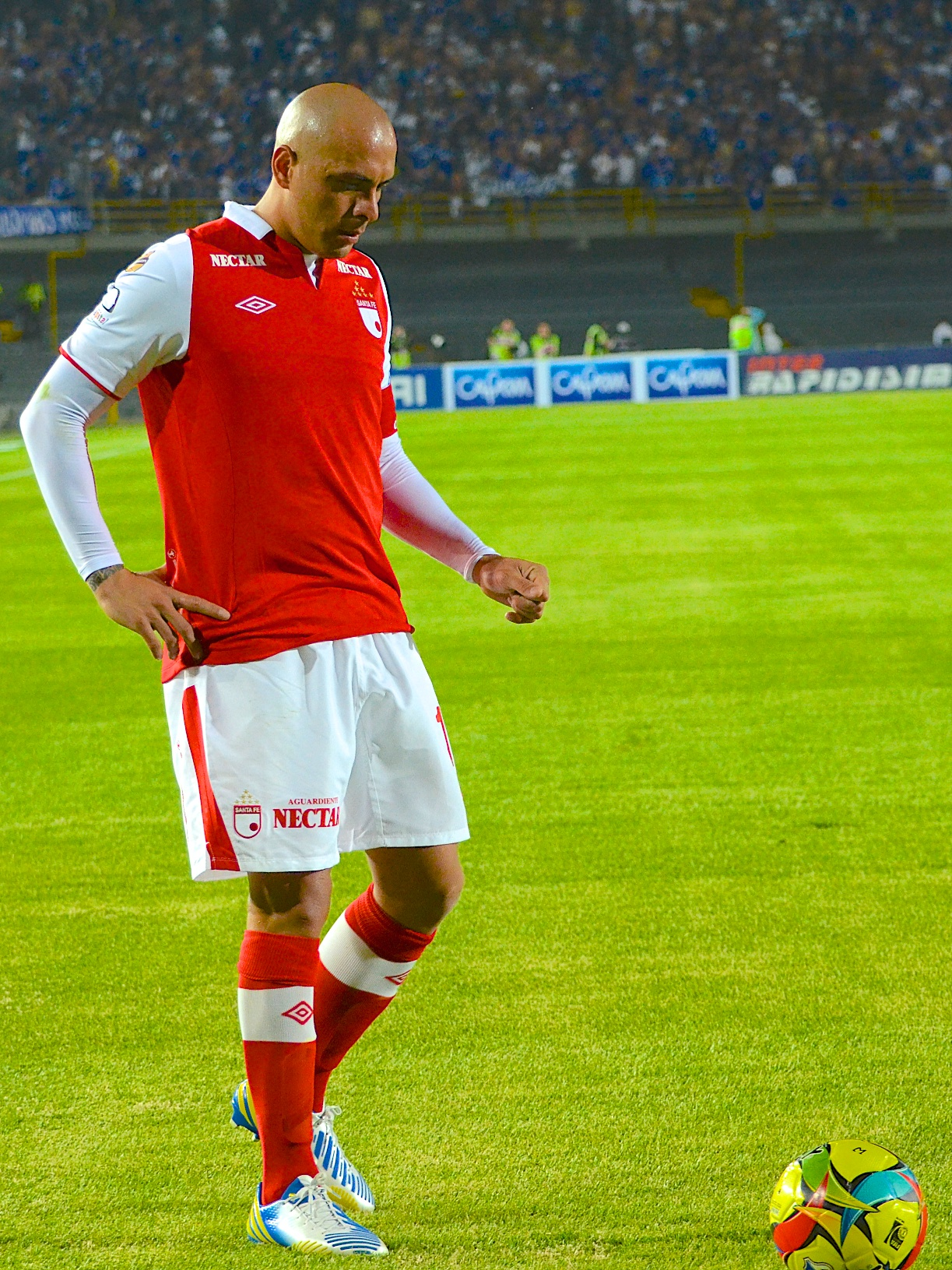

Personal information
- Full name: Omar Sebastián Pérez Marcos
- Date of birth: 29 March 1981 (age 45)
- Place of birth: Santiago del Estero, Argentina
- Height: 1.80 m (5 ft 11 in)
- Position: Attacking midfielder

Senior career*
Years	Team	Apps	(Gls)
2000–2003	Boca Juniors	63	(6)
2003–2004	Banfield	21	(2)
2004–2005	Junior	33	(10)
2005	Jaguares	3	(0)
2006–2007	Junior	29	(5)
2007	Real Cartagena	14	(1)
2008	Medellín	38	(10)
2009–2017	Santa Fe	264	(59)
2018	Patriotas Boyacá	31	(3)
2019	Santa Fe	6	(0)
- * Club domestic league appearances and goals

Omar Sebastián Pérez Marcos (born 29 March 1981 in Santiago del Estero) is an Argentine retired footballer who played as a midfielder.

== Career ==
Peréz began his playing career with Boca Juniors in 2000, during his time with the club he was part of several championship winning squads. Between 2000 and 2003 the club won three Copa Libertadores, 2 Copa Intercontinental and an Argentine league championship.

In 2003 Peréz joined Banfield where he played until 2004.

In 2004 Peréz moved to Colombian side Junior where he played until 2007, with a short loan spell with Jaguares of Mexico in 2005. He was part of the championship winning team of Apertura 2004.

Since 2007 he has played for Real Cartagena, Independiente Medellín and Club Santa Fe of Colombia.

== Career statistics ==
Club performance			League		Cup (Note: Includes Copa Colombia and Superliga Colombiana.)		Continental		Total	
Season	Club	League	Apps	Goals	Apps	Goals	Apps	Goals	Apps	Goals
Argentina			League		Cup		South America		Total	
2000	Boca Juniors	Argentine Primera División	0	0	–		1	0	1	0
2001	Boca Juniors	Argentine Primera División	8	0	–		7	1	15	1
2002	Boca Juniors	Argentine Primera División	10	0	–				10	0
2002	Boca Juniors	Argentine Primera División	1	0	–		9	0	10	0
2003	Boca Juniors	Argentine Primera División	2	0	–				2	0
2003	Banfield	Argentine Primera División	14	0	–				14	0
2004	Banfield	Argentine Primera División	7	2	–				7	2
Colombia			League		Cup		South America		Total	
2004	Junior	Categoría Primera A	–				3	1	3	1
2005	Junior	Categoría Primera A	–				10	3	10	3
Mexico			League		Cup		North America		Total	
2005	Jaguares de Chiapas	Liga MX	3	0	–				3	0
Colombia			League		Cup		South America		Total	
2008	Medellín	Categoría Primera A	38	12	–				38	12
2009	Santa Fe	Categoría Primera A	31	12	–		2	0	33	12
2010	Santa Fe	Categoría Primera A	29	9	–		5	0	34	9
2011	Santa Fe	Categoría Primera A	22	4	2	0	8	4	32	8
2012	Santa Fe	Categoría Primera A	36	12	3	0	0	0	39	12
2013	Santa Fe	Categoría Primera A	37	10	4	0	12	3	53	13
2014	Santa Fe	Categoría Primera A	33	8	7	0	7	4	47	12
2015	Santa Fe	Categoría Primera A	21	1	7	1	15	2	43	4
2016	Santa Fe	Categoría Primera A	12	1	0	0	5	0	17	1
Total	Argentina		42	2	0	0	16	1	59	3
Total	Colombia		259	69	23	1	67	17	349	87
Total	Mexico		3	0	0	0	0	0	3	0
Career total		304	71	23	1	83	18	410	90	

== Honours ==
Boca Juniors

- Copa Intercontinental (1): 2000
- Copa Libertadores (3): 2000, 2001, 2003
- Primera División Argentina (1): Apertura 2000

Junior

- Colombian Professional Football (1): 2004-II

Santa Fe

- Copa Sudamericana (1) : 2015
- Copa Colombia (1): 2009
- Categoría Primera A (3): 2012-I, 2014-II, 2016–II
- Superliga Colombiana (3): 2013, 2015, 2017.
- Copa Suruga Bank (1): 2016.
