= Nelson Ramos (footballer) =

Colombian footballer (born 1981)

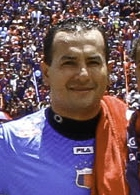

Personal information
- Full name: Nelson Fernando Ramos Betancourt
- Date of birth: November 23, 1981 (age 44)
- Place of birth: Popayán, Colombia
- Position: Goalkeeper

Youth career
- Deportivo Pasto

Senior career*
Years	Team	Apps	(Gls)
2006–2009	Deportivo Pasto	35	(1)
2009–2010	La Equidad	25	(0)
2010	América de Cali	18	(1)
2011–2014	Millonarios	89	(2)
2015	Deportivo Quito	19	(0)
2015–2016	Deportivo Pasto	38	(0)
2016	Fortaleza	19	(2)
2017	Independiente Medellín	5	(0)
2018	Jaguares de Córdoba	7	(0)
2019	Atlético Bucaramanga	13	(0)
2019–2022	Boca Juniors de Cali	71	(5)
- * Club domestic league appearances and goals as of 11 July 2023

Nelson Fernando Ramos Betancourt (born November 23, 1981) is a former Colombian goalkeeper who plays for last time in Boca Juniors de Cali. He was a member of the Colombia squad during the 2011 Copa América. In 2021, Ramos set a record after being the first goalkeeper to score goals from free kicks in three consecutive matches.

== Honours ==
Deportivo Pasto

- Categoría Primera A (1): 2006-I

Millonarios

- Categoría Primera A (1): 2012-II
- Copa Colombia (1): 2011

== See also ==
- List of goalscoring goalkeepers
