= 2009 Categoría Primera A season =

Copa Mustang
- Season: 2009
- Champions: Apertura: Once Caldas (3rd title); Finalización: Independiente Medellín (5th title)
- Relegated: Deportivo Pasto
- Copa Libertadores: Once Caldas; Independiente Medellín; Junior
- Copa Sudamericana: Deportes Tolima; Atlético Huila
- Matches: 376
- Goals: 971 (2.58 per match)
- Top goalscorer: Apertura: Teófilo Gutiérrez (16 goals); Finalización: Jackson Martínez (18 goals); Season: Teófilo Gutiérrez (30 goals)

The 2009 Copa Mustang was the 62nd season of Colombia's top-flight football league, the Categoría Primera A. The season is divided into two championships; Torneo Apertura and Torneo Finalización. Each tournament crowned a national champion and qualified for the 2010 Copa Libertadores.

== Teams ==
Locations of the 2009 Primera A teams

Team	City	Stadium
América	Cali	Pascual Guerrero
Atlético Huila	Neiva	Guillermo Plazas Alcid
Atlético Nacional	Medellín	Atanasio Girardot
Boyacá Chicó	Tunja	La Independencia
Cúcuta Deportivo	Cúcuta	General Santander
Deportes Quindío	Armenia	Centenario
Deportes Tolima	Ibagué	Manuel Murillo Toro
Deportivo Cali	Cali	Pascual Guerrero
Deportivo Pasto	Pasto	Departamental Libertad
Deportivo Pereira	Pereira	Hernán Ramírez Villegas
Envigado	Envigado	Polideportivo Sur
Independiente Medellín	Medellín	Atanasio Girardot
Junior	Barranquilla	Metropolitano
La Equidad	Bogotá	Metropolitano de Techo
Millonarios	Bogotá	El Campín
Once Caldas	Manizales	Palogrande
Real Cartagena	Cartagena	Jaime Morón León
Santa Fe	Bogotá	El Campín

== Torneo Apertura ==
The Torneo Apertura began on February 6 and ended on June 28. Once Caldas won the tournament for their 3rd national title.

=== First stage ===
==== Standings ====
Pos	Team	Pld	W	D	L	GF	GA	GD	Pts	Qualification
1	Deportes Tolima	18	10	2	6	21	16	+5	32	Cuadrangular Semifinals
2	Junior	18	9	4	5	30	18	+12	31	Cuadrangular Semifinals
3	Cúcuta Deportivo	18	9	4	5	16	14	+2	31	Cuadrangular Semifinals
4	Boyacá Chicó	18	8	6	4	24	22	+2	30	Cuadrangular Semifinals
5	Deportivo Cali	18	8	5	5	23	17	+6	29	Cuadrangular Semifinals
6	La Equidad	18	8	5	5	20	18	+2	29	Cuadrangular Semifinals
7	Envigado	18	8	5	5	22	24	−2	29	Cuadrangular Semifinals
8	Once Caldas	18	7	7	4	23	14	+9	28	Cuadrangular Semifinals
9	Quindío	18	7	4	7	23	23	0	25	
10	Real Cartagena	18	7	4	7	23	24	−1	25	
11	América	18	7	3	8	24	21	+3	24	
12	Deportivo Pereira	18	7	3	8	26	25	+1	24	
13	Huila	18	7	3	8	21	26	−5	24	
14	Santa Fe	18	5	6	7	20	25	−5	21	
15	Millonarios	18	3	8	7	16	20	−4	17	
16	Deportivo Pasto	18	4	5	9	12	17	−5	17	
17	Atlético Nacional	18	3	7	8	16	25	−9	16	
18	Independiente Medellín	18	2	5	11	18	29	−11	11	

Updated to match(es) played on May 17, 2009. Source:
Rules for classification: 1) points; 2) goal difference; 3) number of goals scored.

==== Results ====
Home \ Away	AME	HUI	NAC	BOY	CUC	QUI	TOL	CAL	PAS	PER	ENV	DIM	JUN	EQU	MIL	ONC	RCA	SFE
América		2–3		1–1	2–1		3–1	0–1		1–0	4–0		3–0			1–1		
Huila			3–3	0–1	1–2		0–2	1–0	2–0						2–1	0–0	3–1	
Atlético Nacional	0–2			2–1		0–1		1–2		1–1	1–1	0–0			1–0	0–2		
Boyacá Chicó					4–0	2–2	1–1	1–1			2–0	3–2	0–0			1–0		1–0
Cúcuta Deportivo			2–2				2–0		1–0		1–0	1–0	0–0	0–0			2–0	2–1
Quindío	2–0	0–2		2–0	0–1		1–1	0–1		0–2	0–1					2–1		
Deportes Tolima		0–1	2–1						2–0			1–0	1–0	1–0	3–1		2–1	2–0
Deportivo Cali	1–1				0–0		0–1					3–1	2–1	3–0		2–1	2–1	2–2
Deportivo Pasto	1–0		1–1	0–1		0–1		1–0		0–0	3–0			0–1	0–0			
Deportivo Pereira		3–1		4–0	0–1		2–0	1–0			4–2		1–3	3–5		0–1		
Envigado		2–0		1–1	1–0		1–0	3–3				2–1	3–2	1–0		1–1		
Independiente Medellín	1–3	2–1	1–2			1–4			1–1	3–0					1–1		1–1	2–2
Junior		4–0	3–0			4–1			2–0			2–1		1–1	2–1		0–2	3–1
La Equidad	3–0	0–0	1–0			2–1			1–3			1–0			1–1		0–0	1–0
Millonarios	3–1			0–1	1–0	1–1		1–0		2–3	0–1					1–1		1–1
Once Caldas					2–0		2–1		1–1	0–0		1–0	1–1	2–3			3–0	3–0
Real Cartagena	1–0		1–0	6–3		2–2			2–1	3–1	2–1		0–2		0–0			
Santa Fe	1–0	3–1	1–1			2–3			1–0	2–1	1–1				1–1		1–0	

Updated to match(es) played on May 17, 2009. Source:
Legend: Blue = home team win; Yellow = draw; Red = away team win.

=== Cuadrangular semifinals ===
The second stage of the Torneo Apertura was a quadrangular semifinal. The eight teams qualified from the first stage were placed into two groups of four. The top-two seeded teams were placed into separate groups, while the other qualified teams were pooled into odd and even seeds and placed into separate groups. Each group played against each other in a double round-robin format. The top team from each group will play each other in the finals.

==== Group A ====
Pos	Team	Pld	W	D	L	GF	GA	GD	Pts	ONC	EQU	TOL	BOY
1	Once Caldas (A)	6	3	1	2	11	10	+1	10		2–3	2–0	2–1
2	La Equidad	6	2	3	1	5	4	+1	9	1–1		1–0	0–0
3	Deportes Tolima	6	2	2	2	4	4	0	8	4–1	0–0		1–0
4	Boyacá Chicó	6	1	2	3	4	6	−2	5	2–3	1–0	0–0	

Updated to match(es) played on June 21, 2009. Source:
Legend: Blue = home team win; Yellow = draw; Red = away team win.
Rules for classification: 1) points; 2) goal difference; 3) number of goals scored.
(A) Advance to a further round

==== Group B ====
Pos	Team	Pld	W	D	L	GF	GA	GD	Pts	JUN	CAL	CUC	ENV
1	Junior (A)	6	2	3	1	11	6	+5	9		2–2	3–0	3–0
2	Deportivo Cali	6	2	3	1	8	7	+1	9	2–2		1–2	2–1
3	Cúcuta Deportivo	6	1	3	2	6	9	−3	6	1–1	0–1		1–1
4	Envigado	6	1	3	2	5	8	−3	6	1–0	0–0	2–2	

Updated to match(es) played on June 21, 2009. Source:
Legend: Blue = home team win; Yellow = draw; Red = away team win.
Rules for classification: 1) points; 2) goal difference; 3) number of goals scored.
(A) Advance to a further round

=== Finals ===
First leg

June 24, 2009
20:00 (UTC-5)

Once Caldas	2–1	Junior
Romero 26'; Fano 72'		Hernández 78'

Estadio Palogrande, Manizales

Second leg

June 28, 2009
17:30 (UTC-5)

Junior	1–3	Once Caldas
Palacio 29'	Report	Henriquez 16'; Sinisterra 42'; Pérez 72'

Estadio Metropolitano, Barranquilla

=== Top-five goalscorers ===
Pos	Name	Club	Goals
1	(Colombia) Teófilo Gutiérrez	Junior	16
2	(Peru) Johan Fano	Once Caldas	13
3	(Argentina) Pablo Batalla	Deportivo Cali	10
3	(Paraguay) Roberto Gamarra	Cúcuta Deportivo	10
5	(Colombia) Wilson Carpintero	La Equidad	9
5	(Colombia) Adrián Ramos	América	9

== Torneo Finalización ==
The Torneo Finalización began on June 10 and ended December 20.

=== First stage ===
==== Standings ====
Pos	Team	Pld	W	D	L	GF	GA	GD	Pts	Qualification
1	Independiente Medellín	18	12	2	4	29	18	+11	38	Cuadrangular Semifinals
2	Santa Fe	18	8	6	4	31	24	+7	30	Cuadrangular Semifinals
3	Huila	18	8	6	4	27	24	+3	30	Cuadrangular Semifinals
4	Deportivo Pereira	18	7	8	3	21	9	+12	29	Cuadrangular Semifinals
5	Deportes Tolima	18	8	5	5	25	23	+2	29	Cuadrangular Semifinals
6	Junior	18	8	3	7	35	25	+10	27	Cuadrangular Semifinals
7	Atlético Nacional	18	6	9	3	21	19	+2	27	Cuadrangular Semifinals
8	Real Cartagena	18	7	6	5	30	30	0	27	Cuadrangular Semifinals
9	Millonarios	18	6	8	4	24	20	+4	26	
10	Deportivo Pasto	18	7	5	6	24	25	−1	26	
11	Boyacá Chicó	18	6	6	6	32	31	+1	24	
12	Deportivo Cali	18	6	4	8	30	32	−2	22	
13	Quindío	18	6	3	9	22	31	−9	21	
14	Cúcuta Deportivo	18	4	6	8	15	16	−1	18	
15	La Equidad	18	2	11	5	17	24	−7	17	
16	Once Caldas	18	4	5	9	23	35	−12	17	
17	América	18	1	10	7	20	29	−9	13	
18	Envigado	18	1	7	10	32	43	−11	10	

Updated to match(es) played on November 15, 2009. Source:
Rules for classification: 1) points; 2) goal difference; 3) number of goals scored.

=== Cuadrangular semifinals ===
The second stage of the 2009 Copa Mustang II is a quadrangular semifinal. The eight teams qualified teams from the first stage were placed into two groups of four. The top-two seeded teams were placed into separate groups, while the other qualified teams were pooled into odd and even seeds and placed into separate groups. Each group played against each other in a double round-robin format. The top team from each group will play each other in the finals.

==== Group A ====
Pos	Team	Pld	W	D	L	GF	GA	GD	Pts	DIM	JUN	PER	RCA
1	Independiente Medellín (A)	6	4	2	0	12	6	+6	14		0–0	2–2	2–0
2	Junior	6	2	3	1	7	5	+2	9	1–2		2–2	2–0
3	Deportivo Pereira	6	1	2	3	9	11	−2	5	1–2	1–2		2–1
4	Real Cartagena	6	1	1	4	5	11	−6	4	2–4	0–0	2–1	

Updated to match(es) played on December 13, 2009. Source:
Legend: Blue = home team win; Yellow = draw; Red = away team win.
Rules for classification: 1) points; 2) goal difference; 3) number of goals scored.
(A) Advance to a further round

==== Group B ====
Pos	Team	Pld	W	D	L	GF	GA	GD	Pts	HUI	NAC	SFE	TOL
1	Huila (A)	6	3	2	1	8	5	+3	11		1–0	4–1	1–1
2	Atlético Nacional	6	3	1	2	10	7	+3	10	0–1		3–0	2–1
3	Santa Fe	6	2	1	3	6	11	−5	7	2–0	1–1		0–2
4	Deportes Tolima	6	1	2	3	9	10	−1	5	1–1	3–4	1–2	

Updated to match(es) played on December 13, 2009. Source:
Legend: Blue = home team win; Yellow = draw; Red = away team win.
Rules for classification: 1) points; 2) goal difference; 3) number of goals scored.
(A) Advance to a further round

=== Finals ===
First leg

December 16, 2009
20:15 (UTC-5)

Atlético Huila	0 – 1	Independiente Medellín
	Report	Martínez 84'

Guillermo Plazas Alcid, Neiva
Referee: Hernando Buitrago

Second leg

December 20, 2009
18:00 (UTC-5)

Independiente Medellín	2 – 2	Atlético Huila
Martínez 68'; Mosquera 72'	Report	Maturana 43'; Ochoa 83'

Estadio Atanasio Girardot, Medellín
Referee: Óscar Ruiz

=== Top-five goalscorers ===
Pos	Name	Club	Goals
1	(Colombia) Jackson Martínez	Independiente Medellín	18
2	(Colombia) Teófilo Gutiérrez	Junior	14
3	(Colombia) Giovanni Moreno	Atlético Nacional	13
4	(Colombia) Iván Velásquez	Atlético Huila	11
5	(Colombia) Sergio Herrera	Deportivo Cali	10

== Relegation ==
Relegation was determined by an average of the points obtained in the First Stages of the past six tournaments (three seasons). For the purposes of completing the relegation table, the 2007 and 2008 numbers of the 2008 Primera B champion (Real Cartagena) will be the same as the team that finished 16th in this relegation table.

Pos	Team	Pts	GP	Avg	Result
1	Atlético Nacional	165	108	1.527	
2	Boyacá Chicó	163	108	1.509	
3	Deportes Tolima	162	108	1.500	
4	Independiente Medellín	161	108	1.490	
5	Deportivo Cali	158	108	1.462	
6	Junior	157	108	1.453	
7	La Equidad	157	108	1.453	
8	Cúcuta Deportivo	154	108	1.425	
9	Santa Fe	150	108	1.388	
10	Millonarios	145	108	1.342	
11	América	145	108	1.342	
12	Once Caldas	138	108	1.277	
13	Atlético Huila	137	108	1.268	
14	Deportes Quindío	136	108	1.259	
15	Envigado	135	108	1.250	
16	Real Cartagena	135	108	1.250	
17	Deportivo Pereira	133	108	1.231	Playoff match
18	Deportivo Pasto	131	108	1.212	Relegated to the Primera B

Updated as of games played on November 15, 2009.

=== Relegation/promotion playoff ===
By finishing 17th in the relegation table, Deportivo Pereira played a playoff against the 2009 Primera B runner-up Atlético Bucaramanga. The team that accumulated the most points over two legs will play in the Primera A for the 2010 season. If there is a tie in points, goal difference would be taken into account, followed by a penalty shootout. Atlético Bucaramanga host the first leg.

Team #1	Points earned	Team #2	1st leg	2nd leg
Deportivo Pereira	6–0	Atlético Bucaramanga	2–1	3–2

== Aggregate table ==
The aggregate table is the sum of all points and results throughout the entire season, including Cuadrangulares and Finals. This table determined the remaining berths for the Copa Libertadores and Copa Sudamericana

Pos	Team	Pld	W	D	L	GF	GA	GD	Pts	Qualification
1	Junior	50	21	13	16	85	59	+26	76	2010 Copa Libertadores First Stage
2	Deportes Tolima	48	21	11	16	59	53	+6	74	2010 Copa Sudamericana Second Stage
3	Independiente Medellín	44	19	10	15	62	55	+7	67	2010 Copa Libertadores Second Stage (Note: Once Caldas and Independiente Medellín are qualified as the two tournament champions.)
4	Huila	44	18	12	14	58	58	0	66	2010 Copa Sudamericana First Stage
5	Once Caldas	44	16	13	15	62	61	+1	61	2010 Copa Libertadores Second Stage
6	Deportivo Cali	42	16	12	14	61	56	+5	60	
7	Boyacá Chicó	42	15	14	13	60	59	+1	59	
8	Deportivo Pereira	42	15	13	14	56	45	+11	58	
9	Santa Fe	42	15	13	14	57	60	−3	58	2010 Copa Sudamericana First Stage (Note: As 2009 Copa Colombia champion.)
10	Real Cartagena	42	15	11	16	58	65	−7	56	
11	La Equidad	42	12	19	11	42	46	−4	55	
12	Atlético Nacional	42	12	17	13	47	51	−4	53	
13	Cúcuta Deportivo	42	13	13	16	37	43	−6	52	
14	Envigado	42	11	15	16	62	74	−12	48	
15	Quindío	36	13	7	16	45	54	−9	46	
16	Millonarios	36	9	16	11	40	40	0	43	
17	Deportivo Pasto	36	11	10	15	36	42	−6	43	
18	América	36	8	13	15	44	50	−6	37	

Updated to match(es) played on December 20, 2009. Source:
Rules for classification: 1) points; 2) goal difference; 3) number of goals scored.

== See also ==
- Categoría Primera A
- 2009 Copa Colombia
