= Jonathan Copete =

Colombian footballer (born 1988)

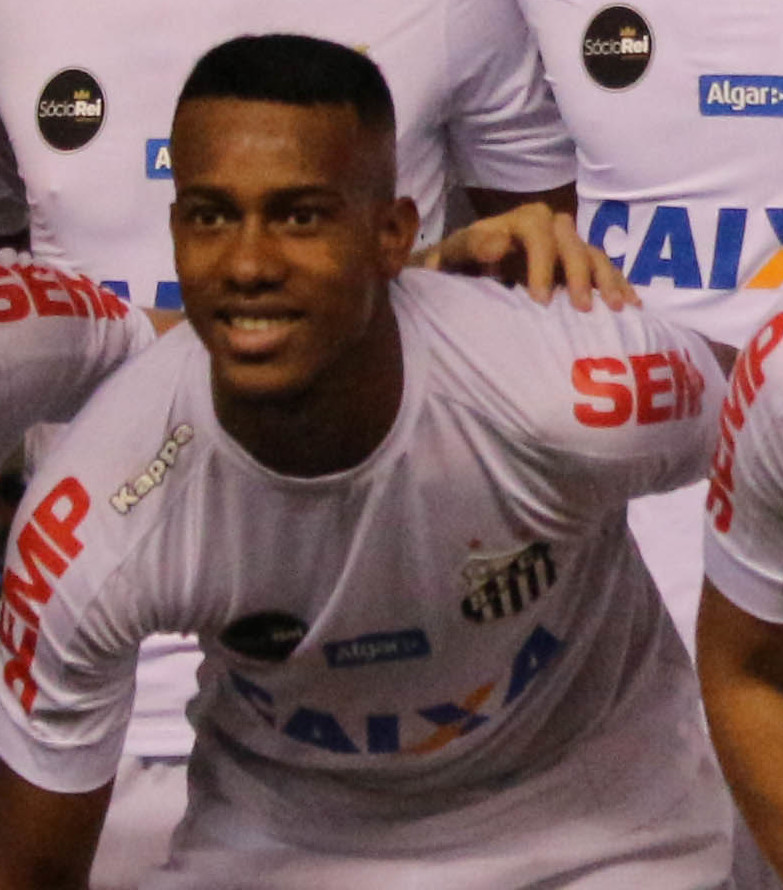
- Copete with Santos in 2017

Personal information
- Full name: Jonathan Copete Valencia
- Date of birth: 23 January 1988 (age 38)
- Place of birth: Cali, Colombia
- Height: 1.88 m (6 ft 2 in)
- Position: Winger

Team information
- Current team: CRB

Youth career
- –2005: Almagro

Senior career*
Years	Team	Apps	(Gls)
2005–2007	Trujillanos	13	(1)
2007–2009	Atlético Trujillo	32	(23)
2009–2010	Trujillanos	32	(10)
2010–2011	Zamora	32	(14)
2011–2012	Santa Fe	40	(24)
2012–2014	Vélez Sársfield	45	(2)
2014	→ Santa Fe (loan)	21	(3)
2014–2016	Atlético Nacional	73	(21)
2016–2021	Santos	140	(26)
2019	→ Pachuca (loan)	17	(2)
2020	→ Everton Viña del Mar (loan)	2	(0)
2021–2022	Avaí	55	(10)
2022	→ Bahia (loan)	14	(1)
2023–	CRB	13	(2)

International career^{‡}
2016	Colombia	2	(0)
- * Club domestic league appearances and goals as of 13 August 2022 ‡ National team caps and goals as of 25 January 2017

Jonathan Copete Valencia (born 23 January 1988) is a Colombian footballer who plays for CRB. Mainly a left winger, he can also play as a forward.

== Club career ==
=== Early career ===
Born in Cali, Valle del Cauca, Copete started his professional career in 2005 in Venezuela, playing for Trujillanos. In 2007, he joined Atlético Trujillo in the second tier, scoring 16 goals in the club's promotion campaign.

After one year back at Trujillanos, Copete joined another Venezuelan team, Zamora, where he won the 2011 Clausura, but lost to Deportivo Táchira the season's final. The Colombian forward was also the top goalscorer of the 2011 Clausura.

=== Santa Fe ===
In 2011, Copete joined Independiente Santa Fe, his first team in his home country of Colombia. There, he was a key player in his team's victory at the 2012 Apertura, scoring seven goals, including the championship goal in the second leg of the final against Deportivo Pasto.

=== Vélez ===
After his championship winning season at Santa Fe, Copete joined Vélez Sársfield of the Argentine Primera División, which purchased 50% of his rights for a fee of US$3 million. Despite suffering an injury early on, his first season proved successful, as he helped Vélez to obtain the 2012 Inicial.

In January 2014, it was announced that Copete would rejoin Santa Fe after two years playing in Argentina, on loan until June.

=== Atlético Nacional ===
On 9 July, Copete moved to league rivals Atlético Nacional. He scored 11 goals for the club during the 2015 campaign, as his side achieved the Finalización title.

=== Santos ===
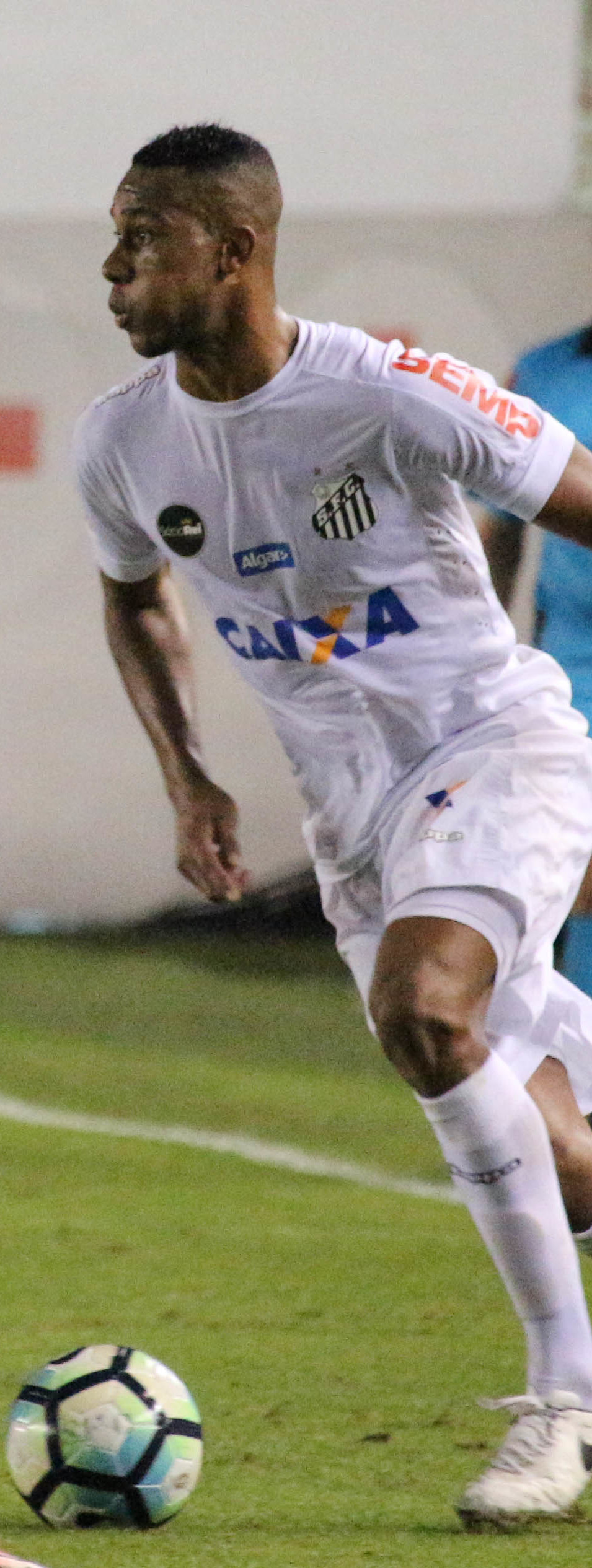
Copete with Santos in 2017

After impressing in 2016 Copa Libertadores, Copete signed for Brazilian Série A club Santos on 23 May 2016, for a fee of US$1.5 million. He signed a four-year deal on 23 June, after the international transfer window opened.

Copete made his debut for the club on 29 June 2016, coming on as a half-time substitute for Vitor Bueno and scoring his team's first in a 2–3 away loss against Grêmio; four days later, again coming from the bench, he provided two assists and scored once in a 3–0 home win against Chapecoense. In October, he scored the winning goals in derbies against São Paulo and Palmeiras, taking his tally up to seven in the league.

In November 2016, Copete scored three goals in only two games, netting the winner in a 2–1 success at Ponte Preta and a brace in a 3–2 home win over Vitória, becoming the club's top goalscorer in the Brasileirão alongside Vítor Bueno. In March of the following year, his deal was extended for a further season.

On 9 July 2017, Copete scored a hat-trick in a 3–2 win against São Paulo. Late in the month, after scoring a double against Flamengo, he became the foreigner who scored more goals for Santos with 22, surpassing Juan Raul Echevarrieta.

==== Pachuca (loan) ====
On 8 June 2019, after featuring rarely due to the competition's foreign player limitations, Copete joined Liga MX side Pachuca on loan for one year.

==== Everton Viña del Mar (loan) ====
On 7 February 2020, Copete joined Everton de Viña del Mar on loan for the season, after terminating his previous deal with Pachuca.

==== 2021 season ====
Copete returned to Santos in July 2020, but due to the club's transfer ban, he was only registered for the 2021 campaign. On 10 June 2021, as his contract was due to expire, he left the club.

=== Avaí ===
On 23 June 2021, Copete was announced at Série B side Avaí. An undisputed starter in the club's top tier promotion, he renewed his contract until 2023 on 21 February 2022.

==== Bahia (loan) ====
On 6 July 2022, after losing his starting spot, Copete was loaned to Bahia in the second tier until the end of 2023.

== International career ==
On 4 November 2016, Copete was called up to Colombia national team by manager José Pékerman for two 2018 FIFA World Cup qualification matches against Chile and Argentina. He made his full international debut eleven days later, replacing Daniel Torres in a 0–3 loss against the latter.

== Career statistics ==
=== Club ===
As of 13 August 2022

Club	Season	League			Cup		Continental		State League		Other		Total	
Club	Season	Division	Apps	Goals	Apps	Goals	Apps	Goals	Apps	Goals	Apps	Goals	Apps	Goals
Trujillanos	2005–06	Primera División	7	1	—		—		—		—		7	1
Trujillanos	2006–07	Primera División	6	0	—		—		—		—		6	0
Trujillanos	Subtotal		13	1	—		—		—		—		13	1
Atlético Trujillo	2007–08	Segunda División	20	7	—		—		—		—		20	7
Atlético Trujillo	2008–09	Segunda División	12	16	—		—		—		—		12	16
Atlético Trujillo	Subtotal		32	23	—		—		—		—		32	23
Trujillanos	2009–10	Primera División	32	10	10	4	—		—		—		42	14
Zamora	2010–11	Primera División	32	14	0	0	—		—		—		32	14
Santa Fe	2011	Primera A	17	3	—		7 (Note: Appearance(s) in Copa Sudamericana)	1	—		—		24	4
Santa Fe	2012	Primera A	23	7	3	2	—		—		—		26	9
Santa Fe	Subtotal		40	10	3	2	7	1	—		—		50	13
Vélez Sársfield	2012–13	Primera División	22	0	1	0	8 (Note: Appearance(s) in Copa Libertadores)	2	—		—		31	2
Vélez Sársfield	2013–14	Primera División	12	0	0	0	3	0	—		—		15	0
Vélez Sársfield	Subtotal		34	0	1	0	11	2	—		—		46	2
Santa Fe (loan)	2014	Primera A	15	1	—		6	2	—		—		21	3
Atlético Nacional	2014	Primera A	16	3	5	1	10	0	—		—		31	4
Atlético Nacional	2015	Primera A	29	11	2	1	8	1	—		2 (Note: Appearance(s) in Superliga Colombiana)	1	41	14
Atlético Nacional	2016	Primera A	11	3	0	0	8	3	—		2	2	21	8
Atlético Nacional	Subtotal		56	17	7	2	26	4	—		4	3	93	26
Santos	2016	Série A	25	10	6	2	—		—		—		31	12
Santos	2017	Série A	29	7	3	3	9	0	11 (Note: Appearance(s) in Campeonato Paulista)	2	—		52	12
Santos	2018	Série A	18	1	2	0	4	0	9	0	—		33	1
Santos	2019	Série A	1	0	1	0	2	0	11	1	—		15	1
Santos	2021	Série A	0	0	0	0	5	0	4	0	—		9	0
Santos	Subtotal		73	18	12	5	20	0	35	3	—		140	26
Pachuca (loan)	2019–20	Liga MX	13	1	4	1	0	0	—		—		17	2
Everton Viña del Mar (loan)	2020	Primera División	2	0	0	0	0	0	—		—		2	0
Avaí	2021	Série B	33	7	—		—		—		—		33	7
Avaí	2022	Série A	7	0	2	0	—		12 (Note: Appearance(s) in Campeonato Catarinense)	3	—		21	3
Avaí	Subtotal		40	7	2	0	—		12	3	—		54	10
Bahia (loan)	2022	Série B	5	0	—		—		—		—		5	0
Total			387	102	39	14	70	9	47	6	4	3	545	134

=== International ===
As of 25 January 2017

Colombia
Year	Apps	Goals
2016	1	0
2017	1	0
Total	2	0

== Honours ==
Atlético Trujillo

- Venezuelan Segunda División: 2008–09

Independiente Santa Fe

- Categoría Primera A: 2012-I

Vélez Sarsfield

- Argentine Primera División: 2012 Inicial

Atlético Nacional

- Categoría Primera A: 2015-F
