= Nondier Romero =

Colombian footballer (born 1979)

Personal information
- Full name: Nondier Humberto Romero Peña
- Date of birth: February 22, 1979 (age 47)
- Place of birth: Palmira, Colombia
- Height: 1.73 m (5 ft 8 in)
- Position: Defender

Team information
- Current team: Jaguares de Córdoba
- Number: 4

Youth career
- 1988: Expreso Palmira

Senior career*
Years	Team	Apps	(Gls)
2000–2001	América de Cali		
2001–2002	Deportes Quindío		
2002–2006	América de Cali		
2006	Once Caldas		
2007	América de Cali		
2008	Deportes Quindío		
2008–2009	Once Caldas	29	(1)
2010	Atlético Huila	10	(0)
2011	Itagüí Ditaires	4	(0)
2012–2013	América de Cali	55	(0)
2013	Jaguares de Córdoba	18	(1)
2015–	Orsomarso	0	(0)
- * Club domestic league appearances and goals as of December 12, 2012 ‡ National team caps and goals as of June 26, 2012

Nondier Humberto Romero Peña (born 22 February 1979) is a Colombian football defender.

== Titles ==
Season	Club	Title
2009	Once Caldas	Categoría Primera A - Torneo Apertura
