= Roberto Polo =

Colombian footballer (born 1980)

Personal information
- Full name: Roberto Polo Guete
- Date of birth: December 21, 1980 (age 45)
- Place of birth: Barranquilla, Colombia
- Position: Striker

Senior career*
Years	Team	Apps	(Gls)
2004–2005	Unión Magdalena		
2006	Brujas		
2006	Cortuluá		
2007	Deportivo Azogues	15	(6)
2007–2009	La Equidad	27	(14)
2009–2010	Cúcuta Deportivo	38	(11)
2011	La Equidad	30	(5)
2012	Itagüí Ditaires	10	(0)
2012	Llaneros	6	(1)

International career^{‡}
2008	Colombia	3	(1)
- * Club domestic league appearances and goals as of 22 October 2012 ‡ National team caps and goals as of 17 September 2012

Roberto Polo Guete (born December 21, 1980) is a retired Colombian football striker.

After coming out of almost nowhere and having a great season with Equidad has recently got him a call up for a friendly game against Venezuela on April 30 of 2008. He played the whole game and scored in only 10 minutes into his debut.
