= 2012 Categoría Primera A season =

Liga Postobón
- Season: 2012
- Champions: Apertura: Santa Fe (7th title); Finalización: Millonarios (14th title)
- Relegated: Real Cartagena
- Copa Libertadores: Santa Fe; Millonarios; Deportes Tolima
- Copa Sudamericana: Atlético Nacional (cup winner); La Equidad; Deportivo Pasto; Itagüí Ditaires
- Matches: 206
- Goals: 493 (2.39 per match)
- Top goalscorer: Apertura: Robin Ramirez (13)

The 2012 Categoría Primera A season (officially known at the 2012 Liga Postobón season for sponsorship reasons) was the 65th season of Colombia's top-flight football league.

== Format ==
Both the Apertura and Finalización had an identical format. Each championship was divided into three stages. The First Stage was contested on a home-and-away basis, with each team playing the other teams once and playing a regional rival once more. The top eight teams after eighteen rounds advanced to a semifinal round, of two groups of four playing once more on a home-and-away basis. The winner of each semifinal group advanced to the final of the tournament, which was played as a double-legged series. The winner of the final was declared the tournament champion and participated in the 2013 Copa Libertadores.

== Teams ==
Locations of the 2012 Primera A teams

Team	City	Stadium
Atlético Huila	Neiva	Guillermo Plazas Alcid
Atlético Nacional	Medellín	Atanasio Girardot
Boyacá Chicó	Tunja	La Independencia
Cúcuta Deportivo	Cúcuta	General Santander
Deportes Quindío	Armenia	Centenario
Deportes Tolima	Ibagué	Manuel Murillo Toro
Deportivo Cali	Cali	Pascual Guerrero
Deportivo Pasto	Pasto	Departamental Libertad
Envigado	Envigado	Polideportivo Sur
Independiente Medellín	Medellín	Atanasio Girardot
Itagüí	Itagüí	Ciudad de Itagüí
Junior	Barranquilla	Metropolitano
La Equidad	Bogotá	Metropolitano de Techo
Millonarios	Bogotá	Nemesio Camacho
Once Caldas	Manizales	Palogrande
Patriotas	Tunja	La Independencia
Real Cartagena	Cartagena	Jaime Morón León
Santa Fe	Bogotá	Nemesio Camacho

== Torneo Apertura ==
=== First stage ===
The First Stage began on January 27 and consisted of eighteen rounds and a series of regional rivalries on the ninth round. The top eight teams out of this stage advanced to the Semifinals. The first stage ended on May 27.

==== Standings ====
Pos	Team	Pld	W	D	L	GF	GA	GD	Pts	Qualification
1	Deportes Tolima	18	10	6	2	28	16	+12	36	Advanced to the Semifinals
2	Santa Fe	18	7	8	3	29	19	+10	29	Advanced to the Semifinals
3	Itagüí	18	8	5	5	25	18	+7	29	Advanced to the Semifinals
4	Atlético Huila	18	8	5	5	23	17	+6	29	Advanced to the Semifinals
5	La Equidad	18	7	7	4	19	16	+3	28	Advanced to the Semifinals
6	Deportivo Pasto	18	6	9	3	24	18	+6	27	Advanced to the Semifinals
7	Boyacá Chicó	18	7	6	5	26	22	+4	27	Advanced to the Semifinals
8	Deportivo Cali	18	7	6	5	19	18	+1	27	Advanced to the Semifinals
9	Patriotas	18	7	6	5	13	17	−4	27	
10	Junior	18	7	4	7	28	24	+4	25	
11	Envigado	18	5	8	5	23	24	−1	23	
12	Atlético Nacional	18	6	4	8	25	20	+5	22	
13	Millonarios	18	4	8	6	22	23	−1	20	
14	Real Cartagena	18	4	8	6	22	31	−9	20	
15	Deportes Quindío	18	3	9	6	20	29	−9	18	
16	Independiente Medellín	18	4	5	9	17	24	−7	17	
17	Once Caldas	18	2	8	8	22	26	−4	14	
18	Cúcuta Deportivo	18	3	2	13	12	35	−23	11	

Rules for classification: 1st points; 2nd goal difference; 3rd goals scored; 4th away goals scored; 5th away goals against; 6th draw.

==== Results ====
Home \ Away	HUI	NAC	BOY	CUC	QUI	TOL	CAL	PAS	ENV	EQU	DIM	ITA	JUN	MIL	ONC	PAT	RCA	SFE
Atlético Huila			3–0			3–0	1–1	1–0		0–0	1–0		1–3		3–2	3–0		
Atlético Nacional	1–2		4–0	1–1		0–1	4–0	0–1			1–2		3–1		1–0	1–0		
Boyacá Chicó				5–2	2–0		3–1		4–1	1–1				1–1	1–0	0–1		2–0
Cúcuta Deportivo	1–0	1–0						2–2		0–1	1–2	0–1		2–1		0–1	0–1	
Deportes Quindío	0–2	2–2		1–0				2–2				2–1		2–2	1–3	1–1	3–2	
Deportes Tolima	1–1		2–2	3–0	2–0		1–1		0–1	1–1					1–0			2–1
Deportivo Cali				1–0	1–1			1–0	1–1	3–0		0–1		1–0	2–1			2–0
Deportivo Pasto			2–0			1–1	1–1		3–1	3–1	0–0		1–1		4–1			1–1
Envigado	1–1	0–0		2–2	3–0							1–2	2–1	1–1		2–0	1–0	
La Equidad		3–2		4–1	2–1				1–0		1–3	0–0	0–0	0–1			1–1	0–1
Independiente Medellín		1–0	0–3		2–2	0–1	0–1		2–2	0–1					2–1			1–1
Itagüí	1–0	1–0	1–1			2–3		3–0	4–2		1–1		1–1			1–1	3–1	
Junior			3–1	4–0	1–1	1–2	1–0				1–0	2–1		1–3			3–1	
Millonarios	1–1	2–3				1–1		1–2			2–1	1–0				0–1	1–1	3–4
Once Caldas				4–0	0–0				1–1	1–1		2–2	2–2	0–0			2–2	2–2
Patriotas			0–0			0–3	1–0	0–0		0–2	2–1		2–1		1–0			0–0
Real Cartagena	1–0	1–1	0–0			1–3	2–2	1–1			3–2		2–1	0–2		2–2		
Santa Fe	4–0	2–2		2–0	1–1				1–1			1–0	2–1	1–1			5–0	

Legend: Blue = home team win; Yellow = draw; Red = away team win.

=== Semifinals ===
The Semifinal stage began on June 13 and ended on July 8. The eight teams that advanced were sorted into two groups of four teams. The winner of each group advanced to the finals.

==== Group A ====
Pos	Team	Pld	W	D	L	GF	GA	GD	Pts	Qualification	PAS	CAL	TOL	HUI
1	Deportivo Pasto	6	3	2	1	7	6	+1	11 (Note: First stage position: Deportivo Pasto 6th, Deportivo Cali 8th.)	Advanced to the Finals		1–1	3–1	1–1
2	Deportivo Cali	6	3	2	1	8	4	+4	11		3–0		1–1	2–1
3	Deportes Tolima	6	3	1	2	6	5	+1	10		0–1	1–0		2–0
4	Atlético Huila	6	0	1	5	2	8	−6	1		0–1	0–1	0–1	

Legend: Blue = home team win; Yellow = draw; Red = away team win.
Rules for classification: 1st points; 2nd first stage position.

==== Group B ====
Pos	Team	Pld	W	D	L	GF	GA	GD	Pts	Qualification	SFE	EQU	BOY	ITA
1	Santa Fe	6	4	2	0	10	6	+4	14	Advanced to the Finals		2–1	1–0	2–1
2	La Equidad	6	2	2	2	10	9	+1	8		2–2		3–1	2–1
3	Boyacá Chicó	6	2	1	3	6	8	−2	7		2–2	2–1		0–1
4	Itagüí	6	1	1	4	4	7	−3	4		0–1	1–1	0–1	

Legend: Blue = home team win; Yellow = draw; Red = away team win.
Rules for classification: 1st points; 2nd first stage position.

=== Finals ===
Pos	Team	Pld	W	D	L	GF	GA	GD	Pts	Qualification
1	Santa Fe	2	1	1	0	2	1	+1	4	2013 Copa Libertadores Second Stage
2	Deportivo Pasto	2	0	1	1	1	2	−1	1	

Rules for classification: 1st points; 2nd goal difference; 3rd penalty shoot-out.
July 11, 2012
19:00

Deportivo Pasto	1–1	Santa Fe
Rendón 25'	Report	Quiñonez 44'

Estadio Departamental Libertad, Pasto
Referee: Luis Sánchez

July 15, 2012
18:05

Santa Fe	1–0	Deportivo Pasto
Copete 71'	Report

Estadio Nemesio Camacho (El Campín), Bogotá
Referee: Wilmar Roldán

=== Top goalscorers ===
Rank	Player	Nationality	Club	Goals
1	Robin Ramírez	Paraguayan	Deportes Tolima	13
2	Giovanni Hernández	Colombian	Junior	11
2	Humberto Osorio	Colombian	Millonarios	11
4	Efraín Viáfara	Colombian	Itagüí Ditaires	10
5	Diego Cabrera	Bolivian	Santa Fe	9
5	Edwards Jiménez	Colombian	Deportivo Pasto	9
5	Omar Sebastián Pérez	Argentinian	Santa Fe	9
5	Milton Rodríguez	Colombian	Atlético Huila	9

== Torneo Finalización ==
=== First stage ===
==== Standings ====
Pos	Team	Pld	W	D	L	GF	GA	GD	Pts	Qualification
1	Millonarios	18	11	4	3	25	9	+16	37	Advance to the Semifinals
2	La Equidad	18	9	6	3	26	17	+9	33	Advance to the Semifinals
3	Junior	18	8	8	2	27	15	+12	32	Advance to the Semifinals
4	Itagüí	18	8	8	2	23	12	+11	32	Advance to the Semifinals
5	Atlético Nacional	18	7	9	2	25	14	+11	30	Advance to the Semifinals
6	Deportes Tolima	18	8	5	5	26	20	+6	29	Advance to the Semifinals
7	Independiente Medellín	18	7	5	6	23	18	+5	26	Advance to the Semifinals
8	Deportivo Pasto	18	7	4	7	22	20	+2	25	Advance to the Semifinals
9	Cúcuta Deportivo	18	6	6	6	22	22	0	24	
10	Santa Fe	18	6	5	7	18	22	−4	23	
11	Deportivo Cali	18	6	4	8	21	22	−1	22	
12	Boyacá Chicó	18	5	7	6	19	22	−3	22	
13	Deportes Quindío	18	6	4	8	20	25	−5	22	
14	Envigado	18	5	6	7	15	18	−3	21	
15	Once Caldas	18	6	1	11	19	27	−8	19	
16	Patriotas	18	4	5	9	17	28	−11	17	
17	Real Cartagena	18	3	3	12	15	33	−18	12	
18	Atlético Huila	18	2	6	10	12	31	−19	12	

==== Results ====
Home \ Away	HUI	NAC	BOY	CUC	QUI	TOL	CAL	PAS	ENV	EQU	DIM	ITA	JUN	MIL	ONC	PAT	RCA	SFE
Atlético Huila		0–0		0–0	0–1	0–0			1–0			2–3		0–4			1–1	2–0
Atlético Nacional				1–1	1–1				1–0	0–0	2–2	1–1		0–0			2–1	2–2
Boyacá Chicó	2–0	1–1				1–1		1–1			1–0	1–1	1–1			0–1	3–0	
Cúcuta Deportivo			2–0		1–0	0–5	1–2		2–1	1–3			1–1		4–1			4–0
Deportes Quindío			4–1			1–2	2–1		1–0	1–1	1–3		0–0		0–1			1–0
Deportes Tolima	1–1	1–3						2–1			2–1	1–2	2–2	0–0		2–1	3–0	
Deportivo Cali	3–2	3–1	2–3			1–3		0–1			2–0		1–1			3–0	2–0	
Deportivo Pasto	3–1	0–2		2–1	3–0		3–0					1–1		3–1		1–1	0–0	
Envigado			0–0			2–0	0–0	1–2		1–1	1–0	0–0			2–1			1–1
La Equidad	5–1		1–1	3–1		1–0	1–1	2–0			1–3				1–0	2–1		
Independiente Medellín	0–0	0–3		1–1				1–0				0–1	2–1	1–1		2–0	5–0	
Itagüí				0–0	4–0		2–0		1–1	3–0			1–1	1–0	1–0			0–0
Junior	4–0	1–0						2–0	2–0	0–0					2–0	4–3	1–0	1–1
Millonarios			0–1	1–0	2–1		0–0		2–0	2–0			2–0		2–1			2–0
Once Caldas	3–1	0–2	5–2		1–3	0–1	1–0	2–1			0–1					1–1		
Patriotas	1–0	0–3	1–0	1–1	2–2				1–2			1–0		0–2			1–1	
Real Cartagena				0–1	2–1				2–3	0–2		3–1	1–3	0–2	1–2			2–1
Santa Fe			1–0			2–1	1–0	2–0		1–2	1–1			1–2	2–0	2–1		

Legend: Blue = home team win; Yellow = draw; Red = away team win.

=== Semifinals ===
The Semifinal stage began on November and ended on December. The eight teams that advanced were sorted into two groups of four teams. The winner of each group advanced to the finals.

==== Group A ====
Pos	Team	Pld	W	D	L	GF	GA	GD	Pts	Qualification	MIL	PAS	JUN	TOL
1	Millonarios	6	3	1	2	8	6	+2	10 (Note: First stage position: Millonarios 1st, Deportivo Pasto 8th.)	Advanced to the Finals		1–0	0–0	3–0
2	Deportivo Pasto	6	3	1	2	8	7	+1	10		3–1		1–0	1–1
3	Junior	6	2	2	2	5	6	−1	8		2–1	1–3		1–1
4	Deportes Tolima	6	1	2	3	6	8	−2	5		1–2	3–0	0–1	

Legend: Blue = home team win; Yellow = draw; Red = away team win.
Rules for classification: 1st points; 2nd first stage position.

==== Group B ====
Pos	Team	Pld	W	D	L	GF	GA	GD	Pts	Qualification	DIM	NAC	ITA	EQU
1	Independiente Medellín	6	3	2	1	4	4	0	11	Advanced to the Finals		1–1	0–0	1–0
2	Atlético Nacional	6	3	1	2	6	4	+2	10		0–1		1–0	2–0
3	Itagüí	6	2	1	3	4	4	0	7		0–1	2–0		0–1
4	La Equidad	6	2	0	4	5	7	−2	6		3–0	0–2	1–2	

Legend: Blue = home team win; Yellow = draw; Red = away team win.
Rules for classification: 1st points; 2nd first stage position.

=== Finals ===
Pos	Team	Pld	W	D	L	GF	GA	GD	Pts	Qualification
1	Millonarios	2	0	2	0	1	1	0	2	2013 Copa Libertadores Second Stage
2	Independiente Medellín	2	0	2	0	1	1	0	2	

Rules for classification: 1st points; 2nd goal difference; 3rd penalty shoot-out.
December 12, 2012

Independiente Medellín	0–0	Millonarios

Estadio Atanasio Girardot, Medellín
Referee: Juan Pontón

December 16, 2012

Millonarios	1–1	Independiente Medellín
Cosme 44'		Zapata 51'
Penalties
	6-5

Estadio Nemesio Camacho (El Campín), Bogotá
Referee: Luis Sánchez

== Relegation ==
A separate table is kept to determine the teams that get relegated to the Categoría Primera B for the next season. The table includes an average of all first stage games played for the current season and the previous two seasons.

Pos	Team	2010 Pts	2011 Pts	2012 Pts	Total Pts	Total Pld	Avg	Relegation
1	Deportes Tolima	70	56	65	191	108	1.769	
2	Atlético Nacional	61	55	52	168	108	1.556	
3	Santa Fe	65	49	52	166	108	1.537	
4	La Equidad	59	45	61	165	108	1.528	
5	Once Caldas	61	65	33	159	108	1.472	
6	Itagüí	41	54	61	156	108	1.444	
7	Junior	48	50	57	155	108	1.435	
8	Deportivo Cali	56	50	49	155	108	1.435	
9	Millonarios	41	56	57	154	108	1.426	
10	Boyacá Chicó	50	53	49	152	108	1.407	
11	Deportivo Pasto	48	41	52	141	108	1.343	
12	Independiente Medellín	57	37	43	137	108	1.269	
13	Envigado	32	60	44	136	108	1.259	
14	Atlético Huila	54	39	41	134	108	1.241	
15	Deportes Quindío	45	47	40	132	108	1.222	
16	Patriotas	43	42	44	129	108	1.194	
17	Cúcuta Deportivo (O)	48	41	35	124	108	1.148	Relegation/promotion playoff
18	Real Cartagena (R)	43	42	32	117	108	1.083	Relegation to the Categoría Primera B

Rules for classification: 1st average; 2nd goal difference; 3rd number of goals scored; 4th away goals scored.

== Aggregate table ==
An aggregate table including all games that a team plays during the year; is used to determine the First Stage berths to both the Copa Libertadores and the Copa Sudamericana. The best-placed non-champion will go to the first stage of the 2013 Copa Libertadores and the 2nd, 3rd, and 4th best-placed non-champions will go to the first stage of the 2013 Copa Sudamericana. Atlético Nacional is already qualified to the 2013 Copa Sudamericana as the champion of the 2012 Copa Colombia.

Pos	Team	Pld	W	D	L	GF	GA	GD	Pts	Qualification
1	Deportes Tolima	48	22	14	12	67	48	+19	80	2013 Copa Libertadores First Stage
2	La Equidad	48	20	15	13	60	49	+11	75	2013 Copa Sudamericana First Stage
3	Deportivo Pasto	50	19	17	14	62	53	+9	74	2013 Copa Sudamericana First Stage
4	Itagüí	48	19	15	14	56	41	+15	72	2013 Copa Sudamericana First Stage
5	Santa Fe (C)	44	18	16	10	59	48	+11	70	2013 Copa Libertadores Second Stage (Note: Santa Fe and Millonarios are qualified for the 2013 Copa Libertadores as the Apertura and Finalización champions respectively.)
6	Millonarios (C)	44	18	15	11	56	39	+17	69	2013 Copa Libertadores Second Stage
7	Junior	42	17	14	11	60	44	+16	65	
8	Atlético Nacional	42	16	14	12	56	38	+18	62	2013 Copa Sudamericana First Stage (Note: Atlético Nacional are qualified for the 2013 Copa Sudamericana as the 2012 Copa Colombia champion.)
9	Deportivo Cali	42	16	12	14	48	44	+4	60	
10	Boyacá Chicó	42	14	14	14	51	52	−1	56	
11	Independiente Medellín	44	14	14	16	45	47	−2	56	
12	Envigado	36	10	14	12	38	42	−4	44	
13	Patriotas	36	11	11	14	30	45	−15	44	
14	Atlético Huila	42	10	12	20	37	56	−19	42	
15	Deportes Quindío	36	9	13	14	40	54	−14	40	
16	Cúcuta Deportivo	36	9	8	19	34	57	−23	35	
17	Once Caldas	36	8	9	19	41	53	−12	33	
18	Real Cartagena	36	7	11	18	35	65	−30	32	

(C) Champions
