= José Luis Tancredi =

Uruguayan footballer (born 1983)

Personal information
- Full name: José Luis Tancredi Malatez
- Date of birth: 14 February 1983 (age 43)
- Place of birth: Montevideo, Uruguay
- Height: 1.72 m (5 ft 8 in)
- Position: Midfielder

Senior career*
Years	Team	Apps	(Gls)
2004–2009	Bella Vista	88	(16)
2009	→ Cúcuta Deportivo (loan)	10	(0)
2010	UTE Quito	14	(2)
2010	Deportes Quindío	6	(0)
2011–2013	Millonarios	57	(7)
2013	Patriotas	15	(3)
2014–2015	Deportivo Táchira	20	(3)
2015	Cerro	12	(1)
2015–2016	Magallanes	22	(4)
2016–2017	Racing Montevideo	15	(2)
2017	Cerro	21	(2)
2017–2018	San José	26	(2)
2018–2019	Albion	13	(5)
2019–2023	Cerro	109	(17)
Total		428	(64)
- * Club domestic league appearances and goals

José Luis Tancredi Malatez (born 14 February 1983) is a former Uruguayan footballer who played as a midfielder.

== Club career ==
In 2011, he joined Colombian side Millonarios. Whilst he was playing for the club during the season, he suffered a tibia and perone injury after receiving a hard tackle from América de Cali defender Andrés Cadavid during a league match.

On 13 June 2015, it was confirmed that he had signed for Chilean club Magallanes of the second-tier.
