= José Mera =

Colombian footballer (born 1979)

Personal information
- Full name: José Hermes Mera Vergara
- Date of birth: 11 March 1979 (age 47)
- Place of birth: Puerto Tejada, Cauca, Colombia
- Height: 1.81 m (5 ft 11 in)
- Position: Defender

Senior career*
Years	Team	Apps	(Gls)
1999	Deportes Quindío	28	(2)
2000	Independiente Medellín	38	(0)
2001–2004	Deportivo Cali	122	(6)
2005	Club Libertad	12	(0)
2005	Deportivo Pereira	22	(0)
2006	Deportivo Cali	5	(0)
2006	Independiente Medellín	10	(0)
2007	Deportivo Pasto	15	(0)
2007–2008	Caracas	30	(2)
2008–2011	Millonarios	84	(4)
2012–2014	Yaracuyanos Fútbol Club	60	(5)
2015	Atlético	12	(0)

International career
2002–2004	Colombia	9	(0)
- * Club domestic league appearances and goals

José Mera (Full name: José Hermes Mera Vergara) (born 11 March 1979) is a retired Colombian football defender.

== Statistics (Official games/Colombian Ligue and Colombian Cup) ==
(Updated 14 November 2010)

Year	Team	Colombian Ligue Matches	Goals	Colombian Cup Matches	Goals	Total Matches	Total Goals
2008	Millonarios	15	1	0	0	15	1
2009	Millonarios	26	2	9	0	35	2
2010	Millonarios	24	1	11	1	35	2
Total	Millonarios	65	4	20	1	85	5

Sporting positions
Preceded by Gerardo Bedoya	Millonarios FC captain (shared with Rafael Robayo); 2010–2011	Succeeded by Mayer Candelo
