= Rafael Robayo =

Colombian footballer (born 1984)

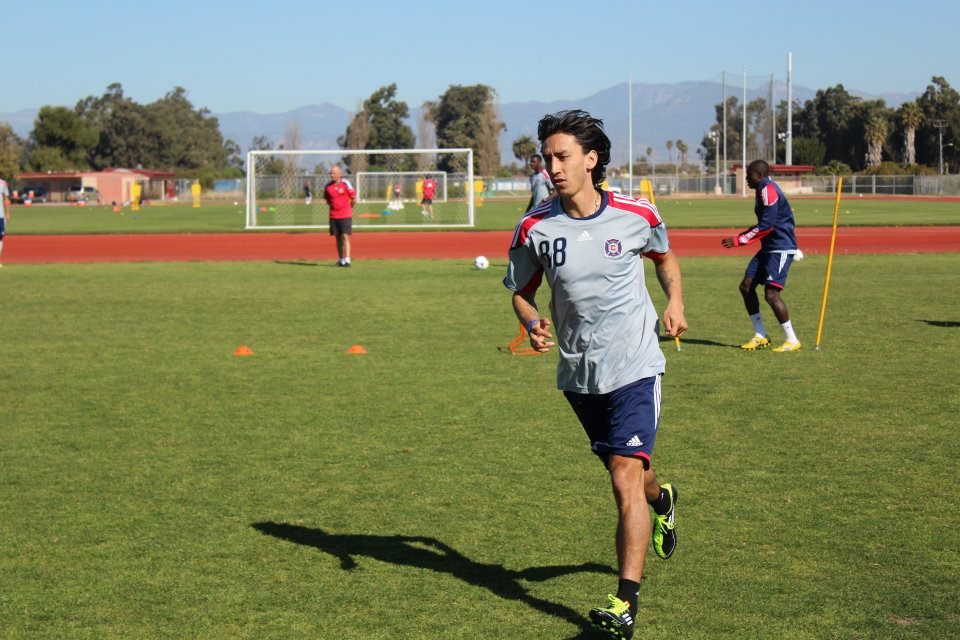

Personal information
- Full name: Rafael Fernando Robayo Marroquín
- Date of birth: April 24, 1984 (age 42)
- Place of birth: Bogotá, Colombia
- Height: 1.84 m (6 ft 0 in)
- Position: Midfielder

Youth career
- 2000–2002: Escuela de Fútbol Vida

Senior career*
Years	Team	Apps	(Gls)
2003–2004	Atlético Nacional	1	(0)
2004	Once Caldas	0	(0)
2005–2011	Millonarios	229	(26)
2012	Chicago Fire	16	(0)
2012–2016	Millonarios	156	(12)
2017	Patriotas	19	(1)
2018	Deportes Tolima	45	(2)
2019	Atlético Bucaramanga	27	(1)
2022	CE Carroi	12	(0)

International career
2010	Colombia	1	(0)
- * Club domestic league appearances and goals

Rafael Robayo (born April 24, 1984) is a Colombian former footballer who played as a midfielder.

== Career ==
=== Atletico Nacional ===
Robayo began his youth career at Escuela de Fútbol Vida. In 2003, he joined top Colombian club Atlético Nacional and made his first team debut.

=== Millonarios FC ===
In early 2005 Robayo joined Millonarios and on May 15 of that year scored his first professional goal in a 1–1 draw with Atlético Nacional in Medellín.

In 2006 Robayo lost his place for Millonarios but in 2007 he bounced back to claim a starting role in midfield as a result of his fine form during the Copa Sudamericana 2007 in which the club advanced to the semifinal stage. After the departure of Gerardo Bedoya in early 2010, Robayo has served as club captain alternating with José Mera. On October 24, 2010, Robayo recorded his first two-goal game as Millonarios defeated Deportivo Pereira by a 2–1 score.

Robayo continued his fine form in 2011 as he helped the club win the 2011 Copa Colombia by a 2-0 aggregate score over Boyacá Chicó. After seven seasons at the club on January 4, 2012, Robayo announced that he would be leaving the club.

=== Chicago ===
A day later it was revealed that Robayo would be joining Chicago Fire in Major League Soccer.

=== Millonarios FC ===
On July 26, 2012, after half a season in Chicago, Robayo was loaned back to Millonarios for the remainder of the 2012 season.

On May 3, 2015, he scored the final goal on a 3–1 win against Independiente Medellín on the 92nd minute scoring by avoiding the opponent goalkeeper, making him Man of the Match. He also scored in a 1–3 win against Santa Fe in the last game of the season, thus eliminating them from the quarterfinals and qualifying his team.

He is currently the eighth player with more presences in Millonarios with over 300 games where converted 31 goals. He is the player from Bogotá with more matches on the team and eighth all time with 334.

== Statistics ==
(As of September 16, 2015)

Year	Team	League Matches	Goals	Cup Matches	Goals	Inter Matches	Goals	Total Matches	Total Goals
2003	Atlético Nacional	1	0	0	0	0	0	1	0
2004	Once Caldas	0	0	0	0	0	0	0	0
2005	Millonarios	28	1	0	0	0	0	28	1
2006	Millonarios	0	0	0	0	0	0	0	0
2007	Millonarios	29	2	0	0	9	0	40	2
2008	Millonarios	33	4	4	1	0	0	37	5
2009	Millonarios	33	1	8	1	0	0	41	2
2010	Millonarios	24	6	10	1	0	0	34	7
2011	Millonarios	38	6	11	2	0	0	49	8
2012	Chicago Fire	16	0	1	0	0	0	17	0
2012	Millonarios	19	2	1	0	5	1	25	3
2013	Millonarios	38	4	10	1	5	0	53	5
2014	Millonarios	29	1	7	0	2	0	38	1
2015	Millonarios	38	3	2	0	0	0	40	3
Total		326	30	54	6	21	1	402	38

Sporting positions
Preceded by Gerardo Bedoya	Millonarios FC captain (shared with José Mera); 2010–2011	Succeeded by Mayer Candelo

Sporting positions
Preceded by Mayer Candelo	Millonarios FC captain 2016	Succeeded by Andrés Cadavid
