= Jorge Horacio Serna =

Colombian footballer (born 1979)

Personal information
- Full name: Jorge Horacio Serna Castañeda
- Date of birth: 27 October 1979 (age 47)
- Place of birth: Medellín, Colombia
- Height: 1.90 m (6 ft 3 in)
- Position: Forward

Youth career
- Independiente Medellín

Senior career*
Years	Team	Apps	(Gls)
1999–2000	Itagüí	29	(18)
2000–2003	Independiente Medellín	103	(46)
2003	Como	1	(0)
2004–2005	Independiente Medellín	66	(19)
2004–2005	Peñarol	14	(4)
2005	Colo-Colo	13	(1)
2006	Independiente Medellín	13	(1)
2006	Caracas	13	(8)
2007	Deportes Tolima	13	(3)
2007	Deportivo Quito	1	(1)
2007	Independiente Medellín	6	(1)
2008	Alianza Lima	11	(0)
2008–2009	Envigado	49	(22)
2010	Atlético Paranaense	0	(0)
2010–2011	Envigado	43	(17)
2012	Mineros de Guayana	15	(4)
2012	Atlético Huila	10	(3)
2013	Deportes Quindío	8	(0)
2014	Malacateco	15	(2)
2015	Fortaleza	12	(5)
Total		435	(155)

International career
1999–2002	Colombia	4	(1)
- * Club domestic league appearances and goals

Jorge Horacio Serna Castañeda (Note: In this Spanish name, the first or paternal surname is Serna and the second or maternal family name is Castañeda.) (born 27 October 1979) is a Colombian former professional footballer who played as a forward. His past clubs include Independiente Medellín (Colombia), Peñarol (Uruguay), Colo-Colo (Chile), Atlético Paranaense (Brazil) and Mineros de Guayana (Venezuela). He made four appearances scoring one goal for the Colombia national team between 1999 and 2002.

== Club career ==
Serna was born in Medellín, Colombia.

In June 2010, Serna returned to former club Envigado after his contract with Brazilian side Atlético Paranaense had been rescinded. He signed a six-month contract.

== Honours ==
Independiente Medellín

- Categoría Primera A: 2004-I

Individual

- Goalscorer Categoría Primera A: 2001
