= Braynner García =

Colombian footballer (born 1986)

Personal information
- Full name: Braynner Yesid García Leal
- Date of birth: 6 September 1986 (age 40)
- Place of birth: Los Patios, Colombia
- Height: 1.85 m (6 ft 1 in)
- Position: Centre back

Team information
- Current team: Unión Magdalena
- Number: 17

Senior career*
Years	Team	Apps	(Gls)
2005–2008	Cúcuta Deportivo	95	(4)
2007	→ Atlético Bucaramanga (loan)	16	(0)
2009–2014	Atlético Junior	154	(5)
2013	→ Itagüí (loan)	15	(1)
2015–2016	Universitario	67	(3)
2017–2019	Cucuta Deportivo	80	(1)
2020–	Unión Magdalena	1	(0)

International career
2007	Colombia	1	(0)
- * Club domestic league appearances and goals as of 15:36, 26 April 2020 (UTC)

Braynner Yesid Garcia Leal (born 6 September 1986) is a Colombian football defender. He currently plays for Unión Magdalena in the Colombian Primera A.

== Career ==
=== Unión Magdalena ===
In December 2019, García joined Categoría Primera B club Unión Magdalena for the 2020 season.
