= Julián Hurtado =

Colombian footballer (born 1979)

Julian Hurtado
Personal information
- Full name: Julian Hurtado
- Date of birth: November 24, 1979 (age 46)
- Place of birth: Tuluá, Colombia
- Height: 1.93 m (6 ft 4 in)
- Position: Defender

Team information
- Current team: Mineros de Guayana

Senior career*
| Years | Team | Apps | (Gls) |
| 2000–2001 | Alianza Petrolera | | |
| 2001–2005 | Cortuluá | | |
| 2006 | Once Caldas | | |
| 2007–2009 | Cúcuta Deportivo | 3 | (0) |
| 2010–2012 | Deportes Tolima | 62 | (5) |
| 2013– | Mineros de Guayana | 0 | (0) |
- * Club domestic league appearances and goals as of February 3, 2013

Julian Hurtado (born November 24, 1979) is a Colombian footballer who currently plays for Mineros de Guayana in Venezuela.

== Honors ==
- Champions Colombian Primera A, 2006 Cúcuta Deportivo
- Semifinalist of Copa Libertadores, 2007 Cúcuta Deportivo
