= Danny Aguilar =

Colombian football striker (born 1986)

Dany Aguilar
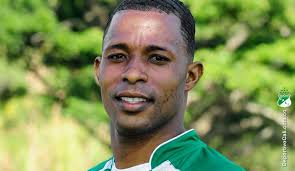

Personal information
- Full name: Danny Leandro Aguilar Mancilla
- Date of birth: February 25, 1986 (age 40)
- Place of birth: Padilla, Colombia
- Height: 1.81 m (5 ft 11 in)
- Position: Striker

Team information
- Current team: Patriotas

Youth career
- Deportivo Cali

Senior career*
Years	Team	Apps	(Gls)
2007–2012	Deportivo Cali		
2007	→ Atlético Huila (loan)		
2010	→ Deportes Tolima (loan)	37	(2)
2011	→ Atlético Nacional (loan)	21	(0)
2013–	Patriotas		
- * Club domestic league appearances and goals

Danny Leandro Aguilar Mancilla (born 25 February 1986) is a Colombian football striker who currently plays for Patriotas.
