= Jonathan Álvarez =

Colombian footballer (born 1987)

Personal information
- Full name: Jonathan Esteban Álvarez Isaza
- Date of birth: 27 June 1987 (age 39)
- Place of birth: Medellín, Colombia
- Height: 1.75 m (5 ft 9 in)
- Position: Midfielder

Senior career*
| Years | Team | Apps | (Gls) |
| 2004–2007 | Envigado | ? | (?) |
| 2008 | Internacional | ? | (?) |
| 2008 | Deportivo Pereira | ? | (?) |
| 2009 | Deportivo Rionegro | ? | (?) |
| 2010 | América de Cali | 10 | (0) |
| 2010–2011 | Deportivo Cali | 36 | (7) |
| 2011–2013 | Atlético Nacional | 20 | (2) |
| 2012 | → Atlético Huila (loan) | 17 | (3) |
| 2013 | → Atlético Junior (loan) | 11 | (0) |
| 2013 | → La Equidad (loan) | 10 | (0) |
| 2014 | Envigado | 34 | (7) |
| 2015 | Once Caldas | 14 | (1) |
| 2015–2016 | Rionegro Águilas | 20 | (2) |
| 2016–2017 | América de Cali | 27 | (2) |
| 2017 | Alianza Petrolera | 10 | (1) |
| 2018 | Sport Huancayo | 5 | (0) |
| 2019 | Juventude | 0 | (0) |
- * Club domestic league appearances and goals as of 15:02, 15 March 2019 (UTC)

Jonathan Esteban Álvarez Isaza (born June 27, 1987) is a Colombian footballer who plays a midfielder, most recently for Juventude.

== Career ==
On 14 March 2019, Álvarez joined Campeonato Brasileiro Série C side Juventude after a spell with Peruvian side Sport Huancayo. Álvares arrived in poor physical condition, and therefore did not make his debut with the club before he was released by mutual consent in May 2019.

== Honours ==
Deportivo Cali

- Copa Colombia winner: 2010

Atlético Nacional

- Copa Colombia winner: 2012
- Superliga Colombiana winner: 2012

América de Cali

- Primera B winner: 2016
