= Lewis Ochoa (Colombian footballer) =

Colombian footballer (born 1984)

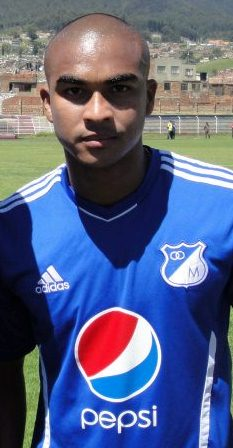

Personal information
- Full name: Lewis Alexander Ochoa Cassiani
- Date of birth: 4 September 1984 (age 42)
- Place of birth: Turbo, Colombia
- Height: 1.75 m (5 ft 9 in)
- Position: Right back

Team information
- Current team: Once Caldas
- Number: 23

Lewis Alexander Ochoa Cassiani (born 4 September 1984) is a Colombian footballer who plays as a right back for Once Caldas in the Categoría Primera A.

== Clubs ==
Club	Country	Year
Independiente Medellín	Colombia	2002–2007
Atlético Huila	Colombia	2008–2009
Independiente Medellín	Colombia	2010
Millonarios	Colombia	2011–2016
Junior	Colombia	2017
Atlético Bucaramanga	Colombia	2017–2018
Once Caldas	Colombia	2019 – present
