= Estadio Polideportivo Sur =

Stadium in Envigado, Colombia

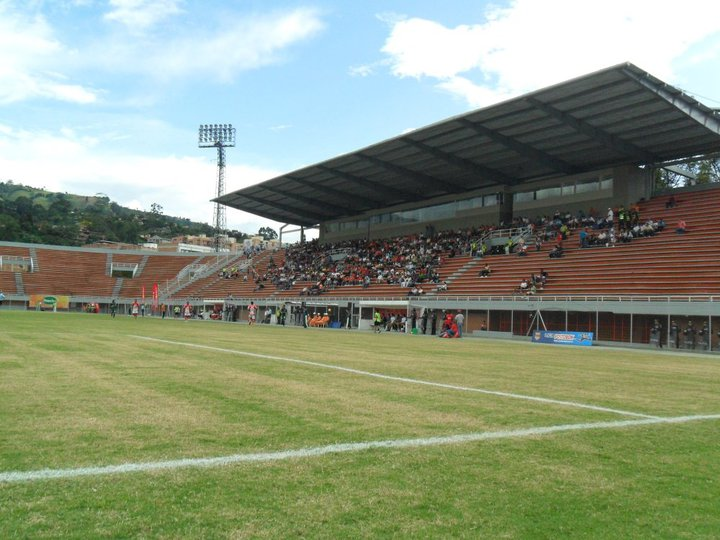
- Interactive map of Estadio Polideportivo Sur
- Full name: Estadio Polideportivo Sur de Envigado
- Location: Envigado, Colombia
- Coordinates: 6.1641076°N 75.5996704°W
- Owner: Municipality of Envigado
- Capacity: 11,000
- Surface: grass
- Field size: 105 x 68

Construction
- Built: 1991-1992
- Opened: 1992
- Renovated: 2009

Tenant
- Envigado Fútbol Club

Estadio Polideportivo Sur is a multi-purpose stadium in Envigado, Colombia that is currently used mostly for football matches. The stadium has a capacity of 11,000 people and was built in 1992. Envigado FC play their home matches at this stadium.

The stadium was renovated in 2009 to prepare for the 2010 South American Games held in Medellín. The renovations added a roof to the main section to protect the fans from weather and beautified the green areas outside the stadium.

== Concerts ==
Estadio Polideportivo Sur has been an important venue for concerts in Medellín.

Date	Event	Attendance	Type	Note
November 29, 2011	Megadeth	TBA	Concert	
March 1, 2012	Maná	TBA	Concert	
March 14, 2012	Enrique Bunbury	TBA	Concert	
