= 2026 Copa Colombia =

Copa BetPlay DIMAYOR 2026

Tournament details
- Country: Colombia
- Dates: 6 May – TBD 2026
- Teams: 36

Tournament statistics
- Matches played: 72
- Goals scored: 203 (2.82 per match)
- Top goal scorer: Tomás Ángel (4 goals)
- All statistics correct as of 17 November 2026.

The 2026 Copa Colombia, officially the Copa BetPlay DIMAYOR 2026 for sponsorship reasons, is the 24th edition of the Copa Colombia, the national cup competition for clubs affiliated to DIMAYOR, the governing body of professional club football in Colombia. The tournament, which is contested by 36 teams, began on 6 May 2026 and the winners will be entitled to qualify for the 2027 Copa Sudamericana.

Atlético Nacional were the defending champions, but they were knocked out by Once Caldas in the semi-finals.

== Format ==
For this edition, the tournament kept the format used since the previous edition, with five stages in which all matchups were determined prior to the start of competition.

The first stage of the competition was split into Stage 1A and Stage 1B, with Stage 1A featuring the 12 Categoría Primera A and the 8 Categoría Primera B teams that failed to advance to the final stages of their league tournament, which were distributed into four groups of five teams (three Primera A teams and the remaining two from Primera B) according to their position in the first stage of the league. In each group, teams had one bye day and played two matches at home and two away, with the top two advancing to the round of 16.

Subsequently, Stage 1B was contested by the 16 teams that advanced to the following round of the Primera A and Primera B tournaments, which were allocated into eight two-legged ties according to their position in the first stage of the league, with the eight winners advancing to the round of 16.

The round of 16 was played by the eight teams advancing from Stage 1A and the eight Stage 1B winners, in which the teams coming from Stage 1A play the Stage 1B winners in eight ties. The winners then advance to the subsequent knockout stages of the competition (quarter-finals, semi-finals, and finals).

Although all knockout stages were set to be contested over two legs, on 19 August 2026 DIMAYOR approved a change of format to the competition due to the 2026 Colombia earthquake which led to the postponement of several matches in all of their competitions, including the Copa Colombia. Because of this, the round of 16 and quarter-finals were played over a single match, only keeping the two-legged format for the semi-finals and the final.

== Schedule ==
The schedule of the competition is as follows:

Round		First leg	Second leg
First stage	Stage 1A	Matchday 1: 6–9 May 2026; Matchday 2: 10–13 May 2026; Matchday 3: 15–17 May 2026; Matchday 4: 20–23 May 2026; Matchday 5: 24–29 May 2026	
First stage	Stage 1B	21 July – 5 August 2026	28 July – 25 September 2026
Round of 16		2 September – 11 October 2026	
Quarter-finals		14 October – 1 November 2026	
Semi-finals		10 November 2026	17 November 2026
Finals		TBD 2026	

== First stage ==
The first stage was split into two phases in which the 36 participating clubs entered according to their placement in the first stage of their respective leagues.

=== Stage 1A ===
Stage 1A was contested by the 20 clubs that failed to advance to the final stages of the Apertura tournaments of the 2026 Primera A and 2026 Primera B: 12 Primera A clubs and 8 Primera B ones, which were sorted into four groups of five. The top two teams in each group advanced to the round of 16.

==== Group A ====
Pos	Team	Pld	W	D	L	GF	GA	GD	Pts	Qualification	CAL	ALI	BOC	BUC	RSA
1	Deportivo Cali	4	4	0	0	10	2	+8	12	Advance to the round of 16	—	1–0	—	2–0	—
2	Alianza	4	2	1	1	6	3	+3	7	Advance to the round of 16	—	—	—	2–1	3–0
3	Boca Juniors de Cali	4	2	1	1	8	8	0	7		1–5	1–1	—	—	—
4	Atlético Bucaramanga	4	1	0	3	8	7	+1	3		—	—	2–3	—	5–0
5	Real Santander	4	0	0	4	1	13	−12	0		1–2	—	0–3	—	—

Source: Dimayor
Legend: Blue = home team win; Yellow = draw; Red = away team win.
Rules for classification: 1) Points, 2) Goal difference, 3) Goals for, 4) Away goals for, 5) Goals against, 6) Away goals against, 7) Drawing of lots.

==== Group B ====
Pos	Team	Pld	W	D	L	GF	GA	GD	Pts	Qualification	MIL	LLA	BOY	PAT	ATL
1	Millonarios	4	3	1	0	14	5	+9	10	Advance to the round of 16	—	1–0	2–2	—	—
2	Llaneros	4	3	0	1	7	2	+5	9	Advance to the round of 16	—	—	—	3–1	3–0
3	Boyacá Chicó	4	1	2	1	6	3	+3	5		—	0–1	—	—	4–0
4	Patriotas	4	0	2	2	4	7	−3	2		2–3	—	0–0	—	—
5	Atlético	4	0	1	3	2	16	−14	1		1–8	—	—	1–1	—

Source: Dimayor
Legend: Blue = home team win; Yellow = draw; Red = away team win.
Rules for classification: 1) Points, 2) Goal difference, 3) Goals for, 4) Away goals for, 5) Goals against, 6) Away goals against, 7) Drawing of lots.

==== Group C ====
Pos	Team	Pld	W	D	L	GF	GA	GD	Pts	Qualification	DIM	FOR	LEO	CUC	ORS
1	Independiente Medellín	4	2	2	0	5	3	+2	8	Advance to the round of 16	—	1–0	—	2–1	—
2	Fortaleza	4	1	2	1	5	3	+2	5	Advance to the round of 16	—	—	4–1	—	1–1
3	Itagüí Leones	4	1	2	1	4	5	−1	5		1–1	—	—	—	2–0
4	Cúcuta Deportivo	4	0	3	1	2	3	−1	3		—	0–0	0–0	—	—
5	Orsomarso	4	0	3	1	3	5	−2	3		1–1	—	—	1–1	—

Source: Dimayor
Legend: Blue = home team win; Yellow = draw; Red = away team win.
Rules for classification: 1) Points, 2) Goal difference, 3) Goals for, 4) Away goals for, 5) Goals against, 6) Away goals against, 7) Drawing of lots.

==== Group D ====
Pos	Team	Pld	W	D	L	GF	GA	GD	Pts	Qualification	PER	RCU	AGU	JAG	INY
1	Deportivo Pereira	4	2	2	0	4	2	+2	8	Advance to the round of 16	—	1–0	—	1–0	—
2	Real Cundinamarca	4	2	1	1	6	4	+2	7	Advance to the round of 16	—	—	2–2	—	2–0
3	Águilas Doradas	4	1	3	0	7	4	+3	6		1–1	—	—	0–0	—
4	Jaguares	4	1	1	2	4	3	+1	4		—	1–2	—	—	3–0
5	Independiente Yumbo	4	0	1	3	2	10	−8	1		1–1	—	1–4	—	—

Source: Dimayor
Legend: Blue = home team win; Yellow = draw; Red = away team win.
Rules for classification: 1) Points, 2) Goal difference, 3) Goals for, 4) Away goals for, 5) Goals against, 6) Away goals against, 7) Drawing of lots.

=== Stage 1B ===
Stage 1B was contested by the eight Categoría Primera A and the eight Categoría Primera B clubs that advanced to the final stages in their respective leagues. The eight Primera A clubs faced the eight Primera B ones in two-legged ties, with the team from the lower tier hosting the second leg.

Team 1	Agg.	Team 2	1st leg	2nd leg
Internacional de Bogotá	3–1	Inter Palmira	1–0	2–1
Deportes Tolima	3–3 (2–4 p)	Deportes Quindío	2–1	1–2
América de Cali	3–2	Real Cartagena	2–1	1–1
Junior	5–5 (3–5 p)	Barranquilla	2–2	3–3
Atlético Nacional	4–0	Tigres	2–0	2–0
Deportivo Pasto	3–1	Bogotá	0–1	3–0
Once Caldas	6–0	Envigado	3–0	3–0
Santa Fe	3–1	Unión Magdalena	2–0	1–1

==== First leg ====
21 July 2026	Atlético Nacional	2–0	Tigres	Medellín
16:00 UTC−5	Zapata 39'; Perlaza 45+2'	Report		Stadium: Cincuentenario; Referee: Carlos Díaz

21 July 2026	Internacional de Bogotá	1–0	Inter Palmira	Bogotá
17:00 UTC−5	Vásquez 74'	Report		Stadium: Parque Estadio Olaya Herrera; Referee: Sebastián Toro

21 July 2026	Deportes Tolima	2–1	Deportes Quindío	Ibagué
18:00 UTC−5	J. Valencia 71'; E. Valencia 81'	Report	Ocampo 20'	Stadium: Manuel Murillo Toro; Referee: Steven Camargo

21 July 2026	Deportivo Pasto	0–1	Bogotá	Pasto
19:00 UTC−5		Report	Velasco 83'	Stadium: Departamental Libertad; Referee: Javier Villa

21 July 2026	Once Caldas	3–0	Envigado	Manizales
19:00 UTC−5	Alvarado 25'; Zapata 33'; Castaño 82'	Report		Stadium: Palogrande; Referee: Ferney Trujillo

21 July 2026	América de Cali	2–1	Real Cartagena	Cali
19:30 UTC−5	Carrascal 29'; Guzmán 54'	Report	Manotas 70'	Stadium: Pascual Guerrero; Referee: Héctor Rivera

22 July 2026	Junior	2–2	Barranquilla	Barranquilla
19:30 UTC−5	Muriel 2'; D. Rivera 26'	Report	Bolívar 68'; Orozco 85'	Stadium: Romelio Martínez; Referee: Wilmar Montaño

5 August 2026	Santa Fe	2–0	Unión Magdalena	Bogotá
19:00 UTC−5	Fagúndez 53'; L. Palacios 64'	Report		Stadium: El Campín; Referee: Carlos Díaz

==== Second leg ====
28 July 2026	Deportes Quindío	2–1 (3–3 agg.) (4–2 p)	Deportes Tolima	Armenia
18:15 UTC−5	Lloreda 65', 90+3' (pen.)	Report	López 45+3'	Stadium: Centenario; Referee: Ricardo Pabón
	Penalties
	Lloreda (penalty scored); Ocampo (penalty missed); Valencia (penalty scored); Castaño (penalty scored); Carabalí (penalty scored)		(penalty scored) H. Martínez; (penalty missed) Arrieta; (penalty missed) A. Angulo; (penalty scored) Hernández

28 July 2026	Bogotá	0–3 (1–3 agg.)	Deportivo Pasto	Bogotá
19:00 UTC−5		Report	Perlaza 4', 45+1'; Obregón 22'	Stadium: Parque Estadio Olaya Herrera; Referee: Luis Matorel

28 July 2026	Tigres	0–2 (0–4 agg.)	Atlético Nacional	Bogotá
20:30 UTC−5		Report	Rodríguez 30'; Morelos 37'	Stadium: El Campín; Referee: Sebastián Toro

29 July 2026	Inter Palmira	1–2 (1–3 agg.)	Internacional de Bogotá	Palmira
17:00 UTC−5	Franco 56'	Report	Vásquez 13'; Sanguinetti 90+2'	Stadium: Francisco Rivera Escobar; Referee: Ferney Ossa

29 July 2026	Barranquilla	3–3 (5–5 agg.) (5–3 p)	Junior	Barranquilla
17:30 UTC−5	Borja 3'; Cortez 63'; Lozano 66'	Report	Suárez 10'; Paiva 25' (pen.); Muriel 88' (pen.)	Stadium: Romelio Martínez; Referee: Ferney Trujillo
	Penalties
	Moreno (penalty scored); Cortez (penalty scored); Oviedo (penalty scored); García (penalty scored); Guerra (penalty scored)		(penalty scored) Muriel; (penalty scored) Castrillón; (penalty missed) Herrera; (penalty scored) Barrios

29 July 2026	Real Cartagena	1–1 (2–3 agg.)	América de Cali	Cartagena
20:00 UTC−5	De Las Salas 17'	Report	Valencia 26'	Stadium: Jaime Morón León; Referee: José Bautista

30 July 2026	Envigado	0–3 (0–6 agg.)	Once Caldas	Envigado
15:30 UTC−5		Report	Torres 3'; Cuesta 41'; Cardona 86'	Stadium: Polideportivo Sur; Referee: Steven Camargo

25 September 2026	Unión Magdalena	1–1 (1–3 agg.)	Santa Fe	Santa Marta
18:00 UTC−5	Molina 10'	Report	Portocarrero 52'	Stadium: Sierra Nevada; Referee: Bismarks Santiago

== Final stages ==
In the final stages, the round of 16 and quarter-finals were played over a single match, while the semi-finals and finals are set to be played under a home-and-away two-legged format. The round of 16 and quarter-final matches, as well as the second leg in the remaining rounds, will be hosted by the team better placed in the league's aggregate table at the end of the Apertura tournament if both teams play in the same tier, or by the Primera B team if both teams play in different tiers. In case of a draw on aggregate score at the end of the second leg, extra time will not be played and the winner will be decided in a penalty shoot-out.

=== Bracket ===
Round of 16
Real Cundinamarca	1
Internacional de Bogotá	2
Deportes Quindío	1 (3)
Llaneros (p)	1 (4)
Barranquilla (p)	1 (5)
Millonarios	1 (4)
América de Cali	4
Deportivo Pereira	1
Santa Fe (p)	2 (9)
Fortaleza	2 (8)
Once Caldas	1
Alianza	0
Atlético Nacional	3
Deportivo Cali	0
Deportivo Pasto	1
Independiente Medellín	4

Quarter-finals
Internacional de Bogotá	4
Llaneros	1
Barranquilla	0
América de Cali	4
Santa Fe	0
Once Caldas	2
Atlético Nacional	3
Independiente Medellín	2

Semi-finals
Internacional de Bogotá	1	1	2
América de Cali	2	1	3
Once Caldas (p)	1	2	3 (4)
Atlético Nacional	1	2	3 (3)

Finals
América de Cali
Once Caldas

=== Round of 16 ===
2 September 2026	Deportes Quindío	1–1 (3–4 p)	Llaneros	Armenia
17:30 UTC−5	Lloreda 10' (pen.)	Report	Mena 44'	Stadium: Centenario; Referee: Carlos Ortega
	Penalties
	Payares (penalty scored); Carabalí (penalty scored); Bacca (penalty missed); Castaño (penalty scored); Valencia (penalty missed)		(penalty scored) Mena; (penalty scored) Meza; (penalty scored) Osorio; (penalty missed) Castañeda; (penalty scored) Ramírez

7 September 2026	Atlético Nacional	3–0	Deportivo Cali	Medellín
20:15 UTC−5	Morelos 4'; Moreno 56'; Velásquez 90+3'	Report		Stadium: Atanasio Girardot; Referee: Jhon Ospina

9 September 2026	Real Cundinamarca	1–2	Internacional de Bogotá	Mosquera
18:00 UTC−5	Fernández 54'	Report	Sanguinetti 39'; Boné 69'	Stadium: Municipal; Referee: Andrés Rojas

9 September 2026	América de Cali	4–1	Deportivo Pereira	Cali
18:00 UTC−5	Rosero 24'; Ángel 41', 45+3'; Guzmán 50'	Report	Largacha 7'	Stadium: Pascual Guerrero; Referee: Carlos Ortega

9 September 2026	Once Caldas	1–0	Alianza	Manizales
19:00 UTC−5	Roa 17'	Report		Stadium: Palogrande; Referee: Diego Ulloa

9 September 2026	Deportivo Pasto	1–4	Independiente Medellín	Pasto
20:10 UTC−5	Perlaza 74'	Report	González 12'; Did. Moreno 27'; Klinger 71'; Palacios 81'	Stadium: Departamental Libertad; Referee: Bismarks Santiago

3 October 2026	Barranquilla	1–1 (5–4 p)	Millonarios	Barranquilla
18:10 UTC−5	Bolívar 6' (pen.)	Report	Silva 22'	Stadium: Romelio Martínez; Referee: Alejandro Moncada
	Penalties
	Torres (penalty scored); Cortez (penalty scored); Lozano (penalty scored); Mendoza (penalty scored); Guerra (penalty missed); Uribe (penalty scored)		(penalty scored) Valencia; (penalty scored) Castro; (penalty missed) Mosquera; (penalty scored) Estupiñán; (penalty scored) Chaverra; (penalty missed) Quintero

11 October 2026	Santa Fe	2–2 (9–8 p)	Fortaleza	Mosquera
14:00 UTC−5	Rodallega 20'; L. Palacios 48'	Report	Wilke 42'; Pulicastro 56'	Stadium: Municipal; Referee: Jairo Mayorga
	Penalties
	Fagúndez (penalty scored); Obrian (penalty scored); Olivera (penalty scored); J. Torres (penalty scored); Rodallega (penalty scored); Scarpeta (penalty scored); Toscano (penalty scored); Rodríguez (penalty scored); H. Palacios (penalty scored)		(penalty scored) Herrera; (penalty scored) Cuero; (penalty scored) Medina; (penalty scored) Ramírez; (penalty scored) Solís; (penalty scored) Salas; (penalty scored) Wilke; (penalty scored) Cajares; (penalty missed) Pico

=== Quarter-finals ===
14 October 2026	Atlético Nacional	3–2	Independiente Medellín	Medellín
20:30 UTC−5	Haydar 23'; Fabra 42' (o.g.); Román 65'	Report	Martegani 63' (pen.), 70'	Stadium: Atanasio Girardot; Referee: Wilmar Roldán

15 October 2026	Internacional de Bogotá	4–1	Llaneros	Bogotá
18:00 UTC−5	Julio 32'; Boné 36' (pen.); Dájome 53'; Caballero 76'	Report	Ospina 21'	Stadium: Metropolitano de Techo; Referee: Camilo Colmenares

21 October 2026	Barranquilla	0–4	América de Cali	Barranquilla
19:30 UTC−5		Report	Bertel 7'; Ángel 43', 69'; Tortolero 45'	Stadium: Romelio Martínez; Referee: Jairo Mayorga

1 November 2026	Santa Fe	0–2	Once Caldas	Bogotá
20:15 UTC−5		Report	Quiñónes 34'; Gómez 81'	Stadium: Metropolitano de Techo; Referee: Bismarks Santiago

=== Semi-finals ===
Team 1	Agg.	Team 2	1st leg	2nd leg
Internacional de Bogotá	2–3	América de Cali	1–2	1–1
Once Caldas	3–3 (4–3 p)	Atlético Nacional	1–1	2–2

==== First leg ====
10 November 2026	Internacional de Bogotá	1–2	América de Cali	Bogotá
18:30 UTC−5	Sanguinetti 5'	Report	Torres 42'; Tortolero 44'	Stadium: Metropolitano de Techo; Referee: José Ortiz

10 November 2026	Once Caldas	1–1	Atlético Nacional	Manizales
20:30 UTC−5	Gómez 38'	Report	J. Rodríguez 83'	Stadium: Palogrande; Referee: Diego Ulloa

==== Second leg ====
17 November 2026	Atlético Nacional	2–2 (3–3 agg.) (3–4 p)	Once Caldas	Medellín
18:30 UTC−5	Cabrera 36'; J. Rodríguez 38'	Report	Barrios 51' (pen.); Nieto 56'	Stadium: Atanasio Girardot; Referee: Carlos Ortega
	Penalties
	Tesillo (penalty scored); E. Cardona (penalty scored); N. Rodríguez (penalty missed); Campuzano (penalty missed); Morelos (penalty scored)		(penalty scored) Torres; (penalty scored) Londoño; (penalty missed) Barrios; (penalty scored) Alvarado; (penalty scored) Patiño

17 November 2026	América de Cali	1–1 (3–2 agg.)	Internacional de Bogotá	Cali
20:30 UTC−5	Mina 87'	Report	Caballero 53'	Stadium: Pascual Guerrero; Referee: Bismarks Santiago

=== Finals ===
TBD 2026
--:-- UTC−5

América de Cali	v	Once Caldas

Estadio Pascual Guerrero, Cali

TBD 2026
--:-- UTC−5

Once Caldas	v	América de Cali

Estadio Palogrande, Manizales

== Top scorers ==
As of 17 November 2026

Rank	Player	Club	Goals
1	(Colombia) Tomás Ángel	América de Cali	4
2	(Colombia) Leonardo Castro	Millonarios	3
2	(Colombia) Jonathan Perlaza	Deportivo Pasto	3
2	(Colombia) José Lloreda	Deportes Quindío	3
2	(Colombia) Jorge Cabezas Hurtado	Millonarios	3
2	(Colombia) Jhon Vásquez	Llaneros	3
2	(Colombia) Pablo Urrutia	Boca Juniors de Cali	3
2	(Colombia) Darwin López	Jaguares	3
2	(Colombia) Jairo Molina	Boyacá Chicó	3
2	(Colombia) Misael Martínez	Alianza	3
2	(Uruguay) Fabricio Sanguinetti	Internacional de Bogotá	3

Source: BeSoccer.

== See also ==
- 2026 Liga DIMAYOR
- 2026 Torneo DIMAYOR
