= Luis Díaz (footballer, born 1997) =

Colombian footballer

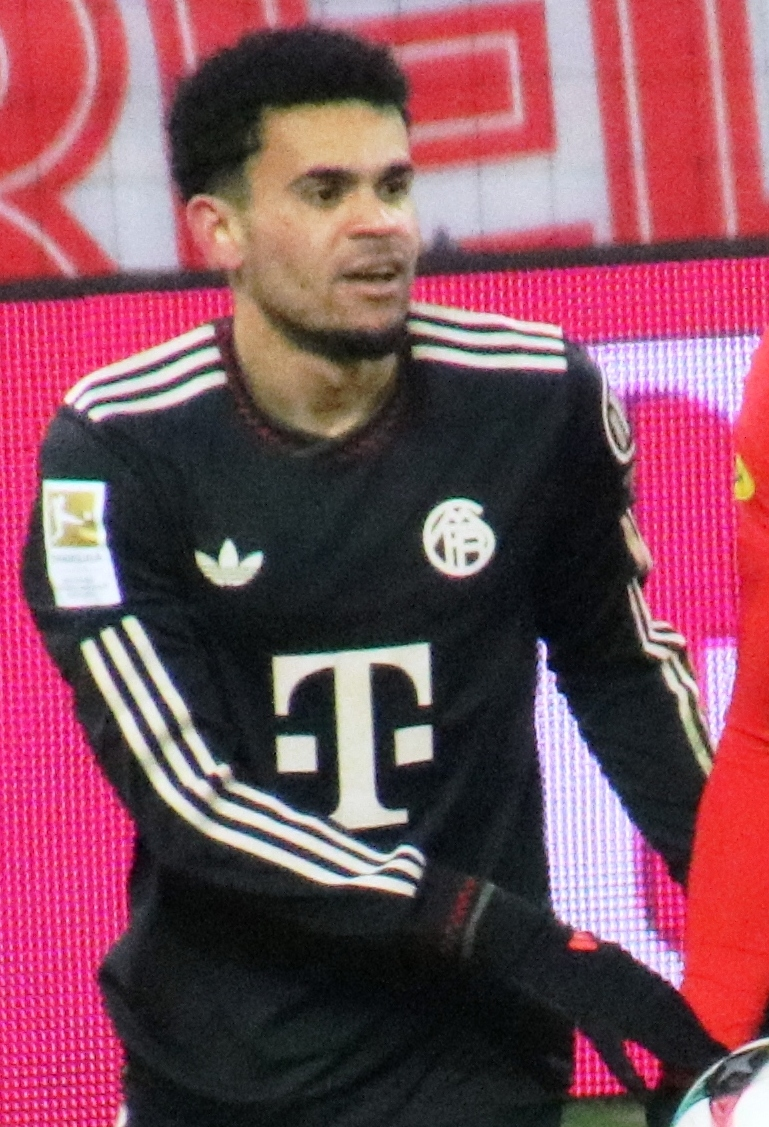
- Díaz with Bayern Munich in 2026

Personal information
- Full name: Luis Fernando Díaz Marulanda
- Date of birth: 13 January 1997 (age 29)
- Place of birth: Barrancas, La Guajira, Colombia
- Height: 1.80 m (5 ft 11 in)
- Positions: Left winger; left midfielder

Team information
- Current team: Bayern Munich
- Number: 14

Youth career
- 2014–2016: Atlético Junior

Senior career*
Years	Team	Apps	(Gls)
2016–2017	Barranquilla	34	(3)
2017–2019	Atlético Junior	67	(15)
2019–2022	Porto	77	(26)
2022–2025	Liverpool	103	(29)
2025–	Bayern Munich	38	(19)

International career^{‡}
2017	Colombia U20	5	(0)
2018–	Colombia	79	(23)
Medal record
Men's football
Representing Colombia
Copa América
Runner-up	2024 United States
Third place	2021 Brazil
- * Club domestic league appearances and goals as of 18:24, 17 October 2026 (UTC) ‡ National team caps and goals as of 22:57, 7 July 2026 (UTC)

Luis Fernando Díaz Marulanda (born 13 January 1997) is a Colombian professional footballer who plays as a midfielder and winger for Bundesliga club Bayern Munich and the Colombia national team. Regarded as one of the best wingers in the world, he is known for his pace, dribbling, and pressing ability.

Díaz began his professional career in the Categoría Primera B with Barranquilla, before moving to Atlético Junior, winning the Categoría Primera A, one Copa Colombia, and one Superliga Colombiana. In 2019, he joined Porto for a reported fee of €7 million, winning two Primeira Liga titles, one Taça de Portugal, and one Supertaça Cândido de Oliveira. After scoring 14 goals in 18 league games in the first half of 2021–22, Liverpool signed him in a transfer worth €45 million (£37.5 million). He won the EFL Cup and FA Cup in his first season, and was man of the match in the latter final. After winning the Premier League in 2024–25, Díaz joined German champions Bayern Munich for a fee of €75 million, including add-ons.

Díaz made his senior international debut for Colombia in 2018. He has earned over 70 caps for the national team, helping Colombia to a third-place finish at the Copa América in 2021, where he was also awarded the Golden Boot, and a runner-up finish in 2024.

== Club career ==
=== Atlético Junior ===
Luis Fernando Díaz Marulanda was born on 13 January 1997 in Barrancas, La Guajira, and began playing football at the age of six. Nicknamed "Luchito", he attended a small football school run by his father. In 2014, at the age of 17, he attended an open trial hosted by Atlético Junior and impressed enough to join the youth team.

He was included in Colombia's 22-man squad for the 2015 Copa Americana de Pueblos Indígenas, due to his Wayuu ethnicity. After impressing during the tournament, he joined the senior team of Atlético Junior in 2016, being immediately assigned to farm team Barranquilla. Given Díaz's slender build and a potentially malnourished appearance, he was given a dietary plan by Barranquilla to gain 10 kg.

Díaz made his senior debut on 26 April 2016, coming on as a second-half substitute in a 2–1 Categoría Primera B home loss against Deportivo Pereira. His first senior goal came on 14 May, as he scored the winner in a 2–1 home defeat of Cúcuta Deportivo.

On 6 June 2017, after already making his first team debut in the year's Copa Colombia, Díaz was subsequently promoted to Junior's main squad. He made his Categoría Primera A debut on 27 August, replacing Matías Mier in a 3–2 loss at Once Caldas, and scored his first goal on 20 September in a 3–1 Copa Sudamericana home win against Cerro Porteño.

Díaz became a regular starter during the 2018 season, and scored his first goal in the top tier on 4 February of that year, by netting the game's only in a home success over Atlético Bucaramanga. He also added braces against Once Caldas, Atlético Huila and Rionegro Águilas, ending the campaign with 16 goals overall.

=== Porto ===
==== 2019–2021: Development and adaptation to Portugal ====
On 10 July 2019, Díaz signed for Primeira Liga club Porto on a five-year contract, with the club buying 80% of his economic rights for a fee of €7 million. Zenit Saint Petersburg had also wanted to sign him, but he was convinced otherwise by compatriot former Porto players Radamel Falcao and James Rodríguez, as well as his then-national team coach Carlos Queiroz. Díaz also admitted that prior to his Porto move, he had signed a pre-contract with Cardiff City, but the move never materialised.

He made his debut on 7 August in a 1–0 win at Krasnodar in the UEFA Champions League first qualifying round first leg as a 55th-minute substitute for Romário Baró, and six days later in the return game he scored his first goal, albeit in a 3–2 loss at the Estádio do Dragão. Domestically, he made his Primeira Liga debut on 10 August in a 2–1 loss at Gil Vicente as a substitute, and a week later scored for the first to wrap up a 4–0 home win against Vitória de Guimarães as a starter. In November, he, Mateus Uribe, Agustín Marchesín and Renzo Saravia were suspended from the derby against Boavista for having partied the night before.

In his first season in Portugal, Díaz totalled fifty appearances and 14 goals as Porto won the league and the Taça de Portugal. In the final of the latter on 1 August 2020, he was sent off after 38 minutes in a 2–1 win over Benfica at the Estádio Cidade de Coimbra.

On 21 October 2020, he scored his first Champions League goal in a 3–1 defeat against Manchester City in the 2020–21 season. On 23 December, Díaz came on as a 77th-minute substitute for Mehdi Taremi in the 2020 Supertaça Cândido de Oliveira against O Clássico rivals Benfica, and scored to confirm a 2–0 win. The following 10 February, he was sent off in a 1–1 draw at Braga in a cup semi-final for unintentionally breaking David Carmo's leg; compatriot Uribe was also dismissed.

==== 2021–2022: Breakthrough and departure ====
On 11 September 2021, Díaz scored in a 1–1 away draw against rivals Sporting CP. On 9 October, he scored the only goal of a 1–0 Champions League group stage win over AC Milan.

With two goals in a 4–0 win over Moreirense on 1 November, he reached five goals in his first six league games, best in the league; On 28 November, he scored his tenth, a long-range effort in the 2–1 victory over Vitória de Guimarães; this goal earned him the Primeira Liga Goal of the Month award. His performances led to him being also named the league's Player of the Month and Forward of the Month for October and November.

On 19 December, Díaz was named the league's Forward of the Month for the second consecutive month, after scoring four goals and providing three assists. Despite leaving Porto halfway through his final season, he was the joint seventh top scorer with 14 goals. Despite leaving Porto in January 2022, he was issued with a winner's medal after the club won the 2021–22 Primeira Liga title.

=== Liverpool ===
==== 2022–2023: Adaptation to England and Champions League final ====
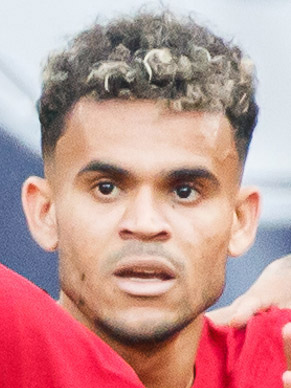
Diaz playing for Liverpool in 2022

On 30 January 2022, Díaz signed a five-year contract at Premier League club Liverpool for a reported €45 million (£37.5 million) with €15 million (£12.5 million) add-ons. Prior to signing for Liverpool, Díaz had attracted interest from Tottenham Hotspur. Upon learning of Tottenham's bid, Liverpool changed their summer plans, and decided to sign Díaz on a permanent deal, after impressing Liverpool's then-manager Jürgen Klopp.

He made his debut on 6 February, coming on as a 58th-minute substitute for Curtis Jones in an FA Cup fourth-round game at home to Cardiff City. He assisted a goal by Takumi Minamino in a 3–1 win. Thirteen days later, he scored his first goal for Liverpool in his second league start for the club in a 3–1 home win over Norwich City at Anfield. In the 2022 EFL Cup final on 27 February, he played the first 97 minutes of a goalless draw with Chelsea that his team won on penalties. On 3 May, he scored the second goal in Liverpool's 3–2 away victory over Villarreal in the Champions League semi-final, to secure his team's place in the final. On 14 May, he started in the 2022 FA Cup final against Chelsea, which Liverpool won 6–5 on penalties after a goalless draw, with Diaz being replaced by Roberto Firmino in the 98th minute, as he was named man of the match. On 28 May, Díaz started in the 2022 Champions League final as Liverpool lost 1–0 to Real Madrid.

On 30 July 2022, Díaz started for Liverpool in the club's 3–1 win over Manchester City in the FA Community Shield at the King Power Stadium. Diaz started the new months of the season by scoring four goals and providing three assists, including a brace in Liverpool's 9–0 win over AFC Bournemouth, which equalled the joint-largest win in the history of the Premier League. However, on 9 October, Díaz came off for Roberto Firmino in the 42nd minute of a game against Arsenal due to an knee injury. After seven months on the sidelines, Díaz made his return from injury on 17 April, replacing Cody Gakpo in the 81st minute of a 6–1 away win over Leeds United. Having not registered a goal since 7 September 2022, Díaz returned to scoring ways on 30 April 2023, scoring Liverpool's second goal in their 4–3 home win over Tottenham Hotspur.

==== 2023–2025: Final year and Premier League champion ====
Díaz entered the 2023–24 season with a new shirt number, changing from 23 to 7. On 13 August, Díaz scored his first goal of the season as his side drew 1–1 against Chelsea in the Premier League. On 19 August, he scored an acrobatic volley in a 3–1 win against Bournemouth.

On 30 September, Díaz scored against Tottenham Hotspur in a Premier League away match, with the goal being disallowed by the linesman for being offside. VAR did not intervene on the decision after an "unusually quick" review. After the match, PGMOL admitted that the offside ruling was a "significant human error" and Díaz should have been awarded a goal. Liverpool lost the game 2–1. On 5 November, in the first match he played since the kidnapping of his parents, Díaz came on as a substitute and scored a stoppage-time equaliser in a 1–1 Premier League draw away against Luton Town. On 24 January 2024, he scored a goal for Liverpool in the EFL Cup semi-final against Fulham which sent Liverpool to the final.

Díaz began the 2024–25 season with three goals in three league matches, including a brace at Old Trafford in a 3–0 win against Manchester United on 1 September 2024. His goal against Brentford on 25 August 2024 was named BBC Goal of the Month. On 5 November, he scored his first Champions League hat-trick in a 4–0 victory over Bayer Leverkusen.

Liverpool won the 2024–25 Premier League, making Díaz the second Colombian to win the league after Juan Cuadrado, who won it with Chelsea in 2015. Additionally, he scored 17 goals during the title-winning season, setting a personal best.

=== Bayern Munich ===
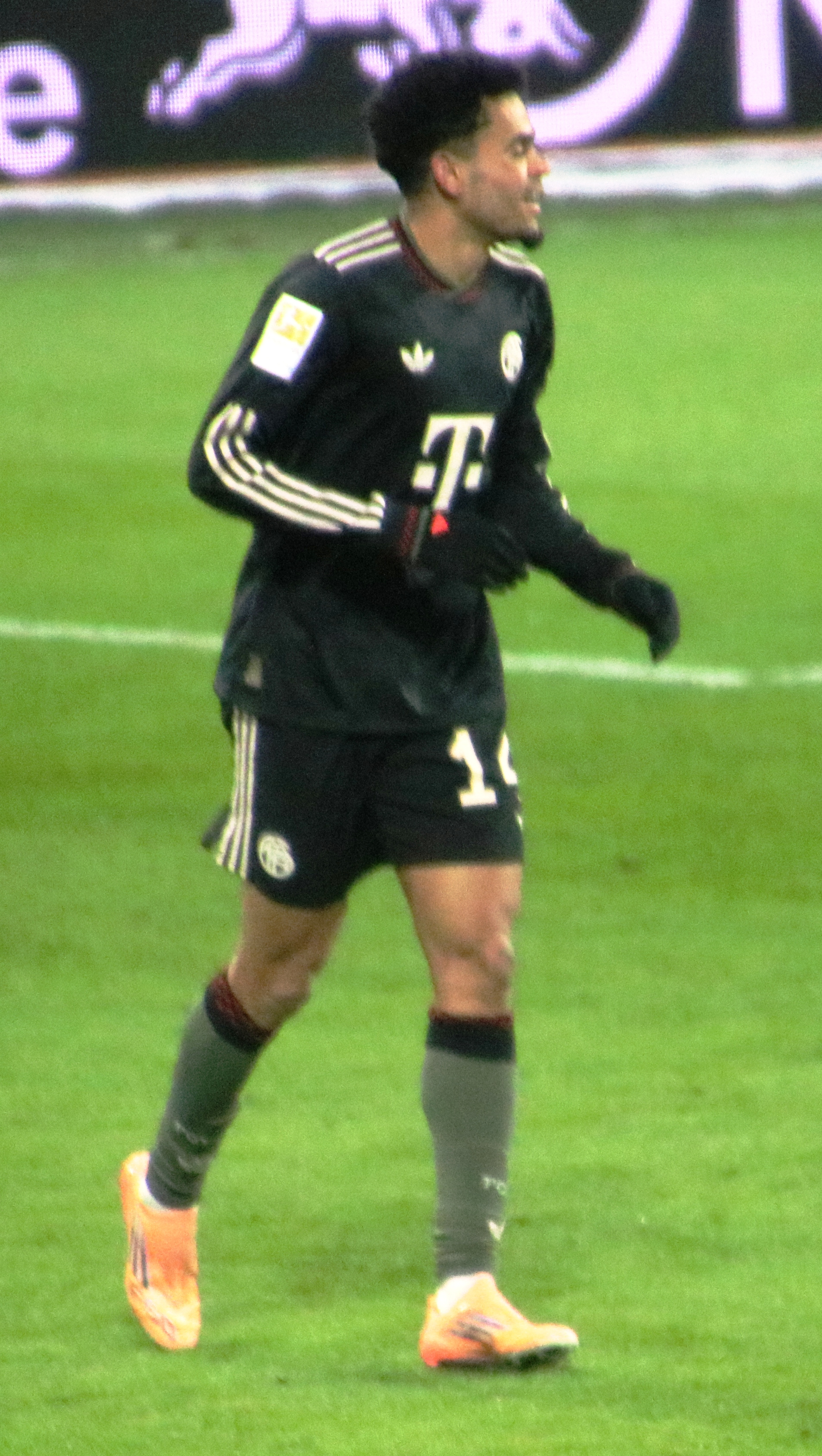
Díaz playing for Bayern Munich in 2026

On 30 July 2025, Díaz signed for Bundesliga club Bayern Munich on a four-year deal for a reported fee of €75 million, including add-ons. He became the third Colombian player to represent the club, following Adolfo Valencia and James Rodríguez. On 16 August, he made his debut and scored his first goal in a 2–1 victory against VfB Stuttgart in the DFL Supercup. By scoring his first goal for Bayern he did his former Liverpool teammate Diogo Jota's gaming celebration as a tribute to him. A week later, on 22 August, he scored a goal and provided two assists on his Bundesliga debut in a 6–0 victory over RB Leipzig.

On 4 November 2025 in a UEFA Champions League league phase match against Paris Saint-Germain, Díaz scored twice in the first-half. Before half-time, he committed a foul that injured Achraf Hakimi, and was sent off with a straight red card. Two weeks later, UEFA suspended Díaz for three games for "serious rough play". In January 2026, German TV viewers named Luis Diaz' goal against Union Berlin on 8 November 2025 as German goal of the year 2025. On 8 February 2026, he netted his first hat-trick for the club in a 5–1 victory over TSG Hoffenheim. A month later, on 18 March, he scored in a 4–1 win over Atalanta in the Champions League round of 16, reaching 14 goals and becoming the top Colombian scorer in the competition, surpassing the tally of Jackson Martínez.

On 7 April, he scored the first goal in a 2–1 away win over Real Madrid at the Bernabéu, securing his club's first victory at the stadium since 1 May 2001 and their first win over Real Madrid since 17 April 2012. A week later, on 15 April, he scored a crucial goal in a 4–3 win over Real Madrid in the second-leg, sealing his club's place in the semi-finals. On 19 April, he provided two assists in a 4–2 victory over VfB Stuttgart, helping Bayern Munich secure their 35th Bundesliga title. Furthermore, he became the first Bayern player to register at least 13 goals and 13 assists in a single Bundesliga season since records began in 2004–05.

== International career ==
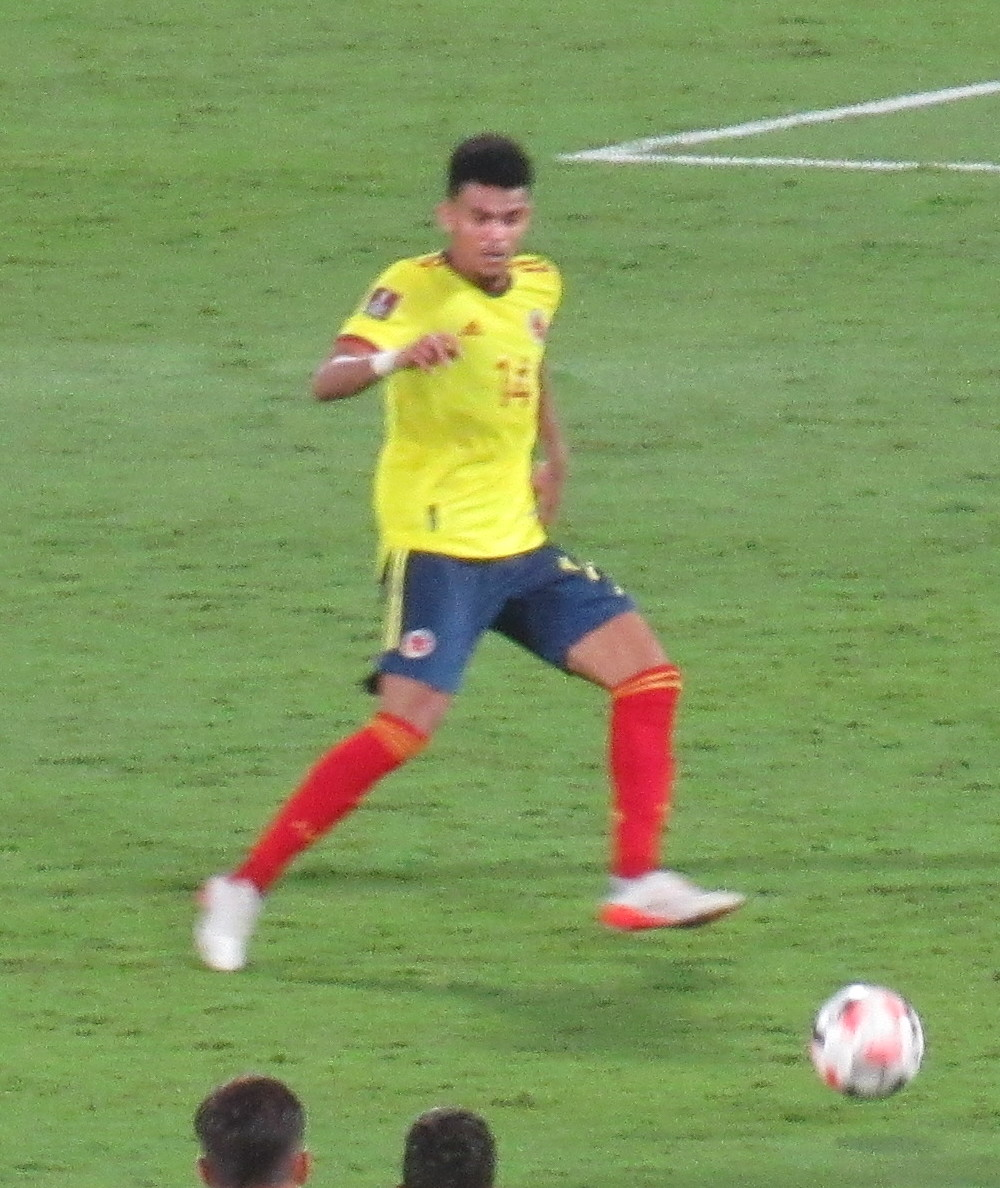
Díaz playing for Colombia in 2022

After representing Colombia at under-20 level in the 2017 South American U-20 Championship, Díaz was called up to the full squad on 27 August 2018, for friendlies against Venezuela and Argentina.

He made his full international debut on 11 September, replacing Juan Cuadrado in a 0–0 draw against the latter at the MetLife Stadium in East Rutherford, New Jersey. Díaz scored his first international goal on 26 March 2019, equalising in a 2–1 friendly loss away to South Korea. He was part of Carlos Queiroz' 23-man squad for the 2019 Copa América in Brazil.

Díaz was included in Colombia's squad for the 2021 Copa América. On 23 June, he scored the opening goal in a 2–1 first round loss to hosts Brazil with a bicycle kick, and on 6 July he scored their goal in a semi-final draw against Argentina, which ended in an Argentine victory following a penalty shoot-out. Three days later, he scored twice, including the match-winning goal, in a 3–2 victory over Peru in the third-place match. He ended as joint-top goalscorer of the tournament alongside Lionel Messi.

On 16 November 2023, Díaz scored both of Colombia's goals as they defeated Brazil 2–1 in what was the first time they had ever defeated the latter in a FIFA World Cup qualifier. On 21 June 2024, he was selected in the 26-man squad for the 2024 Copa América. He would help his national team reach the final, where they lost 1–0 to Argentina after extra time.

Díaz was included in Colombia's squad 26-man squad for the 2026 FIFA World Cup. On 17 June, he recorded his first World Cup goal and an assist in Colombia's opening 3–1 win against Uzbekistan, becoming only the second Colombian to do so, after James Rodríguez.

== Personal life ==
Díaz is of Wayuu origin. His brother, Jesús, is also a professional footballer. In July 2023, Díaz got engaged to his girlfriend, Gera Ponce and they got married in June 2025.

On 29 October 2023, Díaz's mother Cilenis Marulanda and father Luis Manuel "Mane" Díaz were kidnapped by armed men on motorcycles at a gas station in their hometown of Barrancas. His mother was rescued by police a day later, with a "major military search" announced to locate his father. Colombian President Gustavo Petro stated that "all the public forces have been deployed" and the following day, General William Rene Salamanca announced a reward of up to 200 million pesos for information on Díaz's father's whereabouts. Díaz was absent for Liverpool's following Premier League match against Nottingham Forest, with his teammate Diogo Jota holding up Díaz's shirt during a goal celebration. His father was released by the kidnappers on 9 November.

In June 2024, leading up to the 2024 Copa América, Díaz appeared on Colombian singer, Ryan Castro's song "EL RITMO QUE NOS UNE". He also appeared in the music video alongside Colombian national team teammates, James Rodriguez and Juan Fernando Quintero who also sang in the song.

== Career statistics ==
=== Club ===
As of match played 21 October 2026

Appearances and goals by club, season and competition
Club	Season	League			National cup (Note: Includes Copa Colombia, Taça de Portugal, FA Cup, DFB-Pokal)		League cup (Note: Includes Taça da Liga, EFL Cup)		Continental		Other		Total	
Club	Season	Division	Apps	Goals	Apps	Goals	Apps	Goals	Apps	Goals	Apps	Goals	Apps	Goals
Barranquilla	2016	Categoría Primera B	19	2	2	0	—		—		—		21	2
Barranquilla	2017	Categoría Primera B	15	1	6	0	—		—		—		21	1
Barranquilla	Total		34	3	8	0	—		—		—		42	3
Atlético Junior	2017	Categoría Primera A	12	0	7	0	—		4 (Note: Appearances in Copa Sudamericana)	1	—		23	1
Atlético Junior	2018	Categoría Primera A	38	13	2	0	—		19 (Note: Nine appearances in Copa Libertadores, ten appearances and three goals in Copa Sudamericana)	3	—		59	16
Atlético Junior	2019	Categoría Primera A	17	2	—		—		5 (Note: Appearances in Copa Libertadores)	0	2 (Note: Appearances in Superliga Colombiana)	1	24	3
Atlético Junior	Total		67	15	9	0	—		28	4	2	1	106	20
Porto	2019–20	Primeira Liga	29	6	6	2	5	2	10 (Note: Two appearances and one goal in UEFA Champions League, eight appearances and three goals in UEFA Europa League)	4	—		50	14
Porto	2020–21	Primeira Liga	30	6	6	1	1	1	9 (Note: Appearances in UEFA Champions League)	2	1 (Note: Appearance in Supertaça Cândido de Oliveira)	1	47	11
Porto	2021–22	Primeira Liga	18	14	3	0	1	0	6	2	—		28	16
Porto	Total		77	26	15	3	7	3	25	8	1	1	125	41
Liverpool	2021–22	Premier League	13	4	5	0	1	0	7	2	—		26	6
Liverpool	2022–23	Premier League	17	4	0	0	0	0	3	1	1 (Note: Appearance in FA Community Shield)	0	21	5
Liverpool	2023–24	Premier League	37	8	3	1	4	1	7 (Note: Appearances in UEFA Europa League)	3	—		51	13
Liverpool	2024–25	Premier League	36	13	1	0	4	1	9	3	—		50	17
Liverpool	Total		103	29	9	1	9	2	26	9	1	0	148	41
Bayern Munich	2025–26	Bundesliga	32	15	6	3	—		12	7	1 (Note: Appearance in Franz Beckenbauer Supercup)	1	51	26
Bayern Munich	2026–27	Bundesliga	6	4	1	0	—		3	1	1	0	11	5
Bayern Munich	Total		38	19	7	3	—		15	8	2	1	62	31
Career total			319	93	48	7	16	5	94	29	6	3	484	139

=== International ===
As of match played 7 July 2026

Appearances and goals by national team and year
National team	Year	Apps	Goals
Colombia	2018	1	0
Colombia	2019	13	1
Colombia	2020	2	0
Colombia	2021	15	6
Colombia	2022	6	1
Colombia	2023	8	3
Colombia	2024	16	5
Colombia	2025	9	5
Colombia	2026	9	2
Total		79	23

As of match played 17 June 2026
Scores and results list Colombia's goal tally first, score column indicates score after each Díaz goal.

List of international goals scored by Luis Díaz
No.	Date	Venue	Cap	Opponent	Score	Result	Competition	Ref.
1	26 March 2019	Seoul World Cup Stadium, Seoul, South Korea	3	South Korea	1–1	1–2	Friendly	
2	3 June 2021	Estadio Nacional, Lima, Peru	17	Peru	3–0	3–0	2022 FIFA World Cup qualification	
3	23 June 2021	Estádio Olímpico Nilton Santos, Rio de Janeiro, Brazil	20	Brazil	1–0	1–2	2021 Copa América	
4	6 July 2021	Estádio Nacional Mané Garrincha, Brasília, Brazil	22	Argentina	1–1	1–1 (2–3 p)	2021 Copa América	
5	9 July 2021	Estádio Nacional Mané Garrincha, Brasília, Brazil	23	Peru	2–1	3–2	2021 Copa América	
6	9 July 2021	Estádio Nacional Mané Garrincha, Brasília, Brazil	23	Peru	3–2	3–2	2021 Copa América	
7	9 September 2021	Estadio Metropolitano Roberto Meléndez, Barranquilla, Colombia	26	Chile	3–1	3–1	2022 FIFA World Cup qualification	
8	24 March 2022	Estadio Metropolitano Roberto Meléndez, Barranquilla, Colombia	34	Bolivia	1–0	3–0	2022 FIFA World Cup qualification	
9	20 June 2023	Arena AufSchalke, Gelsenkirchen, Germany	39	Germany	1–0	2–0	Friendly	
10	16 November 2023	Estadio Metropolitano Roberto Meléndez, Barranquilla, Colombia	44	Brazil	1–1	2–1	2026 FIFA World Cup qualification	
11	16 November 2023	Estadio Metropolitano Roberto Meléndez, Barranquilla, Colombia	44	Brazil	2–1	2–1	2026 FIFA World Cup qualification	
12	15 June 2024	Pratt & Whitney Stadium, East Hartford, United States	49	Bolivia	3–0	3–0	Friendly	
13	28 June 2024	State Farm Stadium, Glendale, United States	51	Costa Rica	1–0	3–0	2024 Copa América	
14	6 July 2024	State Farm Stadium, Glendale, United States	53	Panama	3–0	5–0	2024 Copa América	
15	6 September 2024	Estadio Nacional, Lima, Peru	56	Peru	1–1	1–1	2026 FIFA World Cup qualification	
16	15 October 2024	Estadio Metropolitano Roberto Meléndez, Barranquilla, Colombia	59	Chile	2–0	4–0	2026 FIFA World Cup qualification	
17	20 March 2025	Estádio Nacional Mané Garrincha, Brasília, Brazil	62	Brazil	1–1	1–2	2026 FIFA World Cup qualification	
18	25 March 2025	Estadio Metropolitano Roberto Meléndez, Barranquilla, Colombia	63	Paraguay	1–0	2–2	2026 FIFA World Cup qualification	
19	10 June 2025	Estadio Monumental, Buenos Aires, Argentina	64	Argentina	1–0	1–1	2026 FIFA World Cup qualification	
20	11 October 2025	AT&T Stadium, Arlington, United States	67	Mexico	2–0	4–0	Friendly	
21	18 November 2025	Citi Field, New York City, United States	70	Australia	2–0	3–0	Friendly	
22	1 June 2026	Estadio El Campín, Bogotá, Colombia	73	Costa Rica	2–0	3–1	Friendly	
23	17 June 2026	Estadio Azteca, Mexico City, Mexico	75	Uzbekistan	2–1	3–1	2026 FIFA World Cup	

== Honours ==
Atlético Junior

- Categoría Primera A: 2018 Finalización, 2019 Apertura
- Copa Colombia: 2017
- Superliga Colombiana: 2019
- Copa Sudamericana runner-up: 2018

Porto

- Primeira Liga: 2019–20, 2021–22
- Taça de Portugal: 2019–20
- Supertaça Cândido de Oliveira: 2020
- Taça da Liga runner-up: 2019–20

Liverpool

- Premier League: 2024–25
- FA Cup: 2021–22
- EFL Cup: 2021–22, 2023–24; runner-up: 2024–25
- FA Community Shield: 2022
- UEFA Champions League runner-up: 2021–22

Bayern Munich

- Bundesliga: 2025–26
- DFB-Pokal: 2025–26
- Franz Beckenbauer Supercup: 2025, 2026

Colombia

- Copa América runner-up: 2024

Individual

- Copa América Golden Boot: 2021 (shared)
- Copa América Team of the Tournament: 2021
- Copa América Tournament Revelation: 2021
- Primeira Liga Player of the Month: October/November 2021
- Primeira Liga Player Fair-Play Prize: 2020–21
- BBC Goal of the Month: August 2024
- Futbolista Colombiano del Año: 2021, 2022
- IFFHS Team of the Copa América: 2021
- O Jogo Player of the Year: 2021
- IFFHS Men's CONMEBOL Team: 2021
- Bundesliga Goal of the Month: August 2025, November 2025
- Bundesliga Team of the Season: 2025–26
- VDV Bundesliga Team of the Season: 2025–26
