= 2018 Categoría Primera A season =

Liga Águila
- Season: 2018
- Dates: 2 February – 16 December 2018
- Champions: Apertura: Deportes Tolima (2nd title); Finalización: Junior (8th title)
- Relegated: Boyacá Chicó; Leones
- Copa Libertadores: Deportes Tolima; Junior; Independiente Medellín; Atlético Nacional (cup winners)
- Copa Sudamericana: Once Caldas; La Equidad; Rionegro Águilas; Deportivo Cali
- Matches: 408
- Goals: 896 (2.2 per match)
- Top goalscorer: Apertura: Germán Cano (12 goals); Finalización: Germán Cano (20 goals)
- Biggest home win: Deportivo Cali 4–0 Boyacá Chicó (14 February); Santa Fe 4–0 Jaguares (25 February); Deportivo Cali 4–0 Rionegro Águilas (3 March); La Equidad 4–0 Boyacá Chicó (6 March); Alianza Petrolera 4–0 Jaguares (18 March); Atlético Huila 4–0 América de Cali (31 March); Santa Fe 4–0 Alianza Petrolera (11 August); Patriotas 4–0 Jaguares (27 August); Junior 4–0 Patriotas (17 October); Deportivo Cali 4–0 Jaguares (27 October); La Equidad 4–0 Patriotas (28 October)
- Biggest away win: Envigado 0–3 Santa Fe (14 March); Junior 0–3 Envigado (21 March); Envigado 0–3 Atlético Huila (22 April); Patriotas 0–3 Ind. Medellín (28 September); Rionegro Águilas 0–3 Santa Fe (6 October); Alianza Petrolera 0–3 Junior (5 November); Millonarios 0–3 Santa Fe (11 November)
- Highest scoring: Junior 4–3 Deportes Tolima (9 October)

The 2018 Categoría Primera A season (officially known as the 2018 Liga Águila season for sponsorship reasons) was the 71st season of Colombia's top-flight football league. The season began on 2 February and concluded on 16 December. Millonarios were the defending champions.

In the Torneo Apertura, Deportes Tolima won their second league title on 9 June, after tying with Atlético Nacional 2–2 on aggregate score in the finals and then beating them 4–2 on penalties and in the Torneo Finalización, Junior won their eighth title on 16 December, following a 5–4 win against Independiente Medellín on aggregate score in the finals.

== Format ==
The league was played under the same format used since the 2015 season, with the exclusion of the regional derby matchday in the first stage of both the Apertura and Finalización tournaments being the only change to be applied for this season. Both tournaments were divided into three stages: a first stage which was contested on a single round-robin basis, with each team playing the other teams once for a total of 19 matches. The top eight teams after the nineteen rounds advanced to a knockout round, where they were drawn into four ties to be played on a home-and-away basis, with the four winners advancing to the semifinals and the winners of each semifinal advancing to the final of the tournament. The winners of the final in each tournament were declared as champions. Relegation to Categoría Primera B by average continued being used.

== Teams ==
20 teams took part, eighteen of them returning from last season plus Boyacá Chicó and Leones, who were promoted from the 2017 Primera B. Leones became the first team to secure promotion, after winning the Torneo Finalización on 26 November 2017, and competed in the Primera A for the first time ever. On the other hand, Boyacá Chicó sealed their promotion on 6 December 2017, by winning the Primera B championship on penalty kicks against Leones. They returned to the top tier after just one year. Both promoted teams replaced Cortuluá and Tigres who were relegated at the end of the last season.

=== Stadia and locations ===
Locations of the 2018 Categoría Primera A teams

Team	Manager	Home city	Stadium	Capacity
Alianza Petrolera	(Colombia) César Torres	Barrancabermeja	Daniel Villa Zapata	10,400
América de Cali	(Colombia) Fernando Castro	Cali	Pascual Guerrero	33,130
Atlético Bucaramanga	(Colombia) Óscar Serrano (caretaker)	Bucaramanga	Alfonso López	28,000
Atlético Huila	(Colombia) Dayron Pérez (caretaker)	Neiva	Guillermo Plazas Alcid^{a}	22,000
Atlético Nacional	(Brazil) Paulo Autuori	Medellín	Atanasio Girardot	40,043
Boyacá Chicó	(Colombia) Jhon Jaime Gómez	Tunja	La Independencia	20,630
Deportes Tolima	(Colombia) Alberto Gamero	Ibagué	Manuel Murillo Toro	28,100
Deportivo Cali	(Uruguay) Gerardo Pelusso	Cali	Deportivo Cali	52,000
Deportivo Pasto	(Colombia) Jairo Enríquez (caretaker)	Pasto	Departamental Libertad	20,665
Envigado	(Colombia) Eduardo Lara	Envigado	Polideportivo Sur	11,000
Independiente Medellín	(Ecuador) Octavio Zambrano	Medellín	Atanasio Girardot	40,043
Jaguares	(Colombia) Julio Méndez (caretaker)	Montería	Jaraguay^{b}	12,000
Junior	(Uruguay) Julio Comesaña	Barranquilla	Metropolitano Roberto Meléndez^{c}	49,692
La Equidad	(Colombia) Luis Fernando Suárez	Bogotá	Metropolitano de Techo	8,000
Leones	(Colombia) Luis Amaranto Perea	Itagüí	Metropolitano Ciudad de Itagüí	12,000
Millonarios	(Argentina) Miguel Ángel Russo	Bogotá	Nemesio Camacho El Campín	36,343
Once Caldas	(Colombia) Hubert Bodhert	Manizales	Palogrande	28,678
Patriotas	(Colombia) Diego Corredor	Tunja	La Independencia	20,630
Rionegro Águilas	(Colombia) Jorge Luis Bernal	Rionegro	Alberto Grisales	14,000
Santa Fe	(Uruguay) Guillermo Sanguinetti	Bogotá	Nemesio Camacho El Campín	36,343

a: Atlético Huila played their first three home games in the Torneo Apertura (against Deportivo Cali, Junior, and La Equidad) at Estadio Manuel Murillo Toro in Ibagué due to their regular stadium Estadio Guillermo Plazas Alcid not meeting DIMAYOR's stadium requirements.
b: Jaguares played their first three home games in the Torneo Apertura (against La Equidad, Deportes Tolima, and Patriotas) at Estadio Armando Tuirán Paternina in Sahagún due to works on the artificial lighting system at Estadio Jaraguay which enabled it to meet DIMAYOR's stadium requirements.
c: Junior played their home matches against Deportivo Pasto, Atlético Huila, and Rionegro Águilas at Estadio Romelio Martínez in Barranquilla instead of their regular stadium Estadio Metropolitano Roberto Meléndez.

=== Managerial changes ===
Team	Outgoing manager	Manner of departure	Date of vacancy	Position in table	Incoming manager	Date of appointment
Torneo Apertura
Atlético Bucaramanga	(Colombia) Jaime de la Pava	Mutual consent	27 November 2017	Pre-season	(Argentina) Diego Cagna	15 December 2017
Atlético Nacional	(Spain) Juan Manuel Lillo	Resigned	5 December 2017	Pre-season	(Argentina) Jorge Almirón	19 December 2017
Junior	(Uruguay) Julio Comesaña	Resigned	5 December 2017	Pre-season	(Colombia) Alexis Mendoza	14 December 2017
Jaguares	(Colombia) Hubert Bodhert	Resigned	5 December 2017	Pre-season	(Colombia) José Manuel Rodríguez	5 December 2017
Once Caldas	(Colombia) Herney Duque	End of caretaker spell	7 December 2017	Pre-season	(Colombia) Hubert Bodhert	7 December 2017
Deportivo Cali	(Colombia) Sergio Angulo	End of caretaker spell	9 December 2017	Pre-season	(Uruguay) Gerardo Pelusso	9 December 2017
Rionegro Águilas	(Colombia) Diego Edison Umaña	Sacked	10 December 2017	Pre-season	(Colombia) Hernán Torres	13 December 2017
América de Cali	(Uruguay) Jorge da Silva	Resigned	24 March 2018	16th	(Colombia) Carlos Asprilla (caretaker)	26 March 2018
América de Cali	(Colombia) Carlos Asprilla	End of caretaker spell	1 April 2018	18th	(Portugal) Pedro Felício Santos	4 April 2018
Junior	(Colombia) Alexis Mendoza	Sacked	9 April 2018	3rd	(Colombia) Fernel Díaz (caretaker)	9 April 2018
Junior	(Colombia) Fernel Díaz	End of caretaker spell	11 April 2018	3rd	(Uruguay) Julio Comesaña	12 April 2018
Santa Fe	(Uruguay) Gregorio Pérez	Sacked	14 April 2018	13th	(Colombia) Agustín Julio (caretaker)	14 April 2018
Atlético Bucaramanga	(Argentina) Diego Cagna	Mutual consent	21 April 2018	12th	(Colombia) Adolfo León Holguín (caretaker)	22 April 2018
Rionegro Águilas	(Colombia) Hernán Torres	Resigned	17 May 2018	13th	(Colombia) Jorge Luis Bernal	31 May 2018
Atlético Bucaramanga	(Colombia) Adolfo León Holguín	End of caretaker spell	21 May 2018	16th	(Colombia) Carlos Mario Hoyos	21 May 2018
Santa Fe	(Colombia) Agustín Julio	End of caretaker spell	23 May 2018	12th	(Uruguay) Guillermo Sanguinetti	12 June 2018
Independiente Medellín	(Spain) Ismael Rescalvo	Mutual consent	6 June 2018	2nd, SFs	(Ecuador) Octavio Zambrano	15 June 2018
Torneo Finalización
Deportivo Pasto	(Colombia) Flabio Torres	Resigned	6 August 2018	18th	(Argentina) Hernán Lisi	6 August 2018
América de Cali	(Portugal) Pedro Felício Santos	Sacked	19 August 2018	13th	(Colombia) Jersson González (caretaker)	20 August 2018
Atlético Bucaramanga	(Colombia) Carlos Mario Hoyos	Mutual consent	19 August 2018	15th	(Colombia) Óscar Serrano (caretaker)	20 August 2018
Envigado	(Colombia) Rubén Darío Bedoya	Resigned	21 August 2018	17th	(Colombia) Juan Carlos Ramírez (caretaker)	23 August 2018
Leones	(Colombia) Juan Carlos Álvarez	Mutual consent	24 August 2018	20th	(Colombia) Mauricio Martínez (caretaker)	24 August 2018
América de Cali	(Colombia) Jersson González	End of caretaker spell	25 August 2018	15th	(Colombia) Fernando Castro	26 August 2018
Leones	(Colombia) Mauricio Martínez	End of caretaker spell	27 August 2018	20th	(Colombia) Luis Amaranto Perea	27 August 2018
Jaguares	(Colombia) José Manuel Rodríguez	Resigned	27 August 2018	16th	(Argentina) Flavio Robatto	29 August 2018
Atlético Nacional	(Argentina) Jorge Almirón	Resigned	30 August 2018	5th	(Colombia) Hernán Darío Herrera (caretaker)	30 August 2018
Atlético Huila	(Argentina) Néstor Craviotto	Mutual consent	9 September 2018	20th	(Colombia) Dayron Pérez (caretaker)	10 September 2018
Alianza Petrolera	(Argentina) Juan Cruz Real	Sacked	23 September 2018	13th	(Colombia) Diego Estrada (caretaker)	24 September 2018
Envigado	(Colombia) Juan Carlos Ramírez	End of caretaker spell	24 September 2018	18th	(Colombia) Eduardo Lara	25 September 2018
Alianza Petrolera	(Colombia) Diego Estrada	End of caretaker spell	6 October 2018	15th	(Colombia) César Torres	7 October 2018
Deportivo Pasto	(Argentina) Hernán Lisi	Sacked	19 October 2018	17th	(Colombia) Jairo Enríquez (caretaker)	19 October 2018
Jaguares	(Argentina) Flavio Robatto	Resigned	28 October 2018	19th	(Colombia) Julio Méndez (caretaker)	28 October 2018
Atlético Nacional	(Colombia) Hernán Darío Herrera	End of caretaker spell	2 November 2018	7th	(Brazil) Paulo Autuori	2 November 2018

== Torneo Apertura ==
=== First stage ===
The First stage began on 2 February and consisted of nineteen rounds with teams playing each other once. It ended on 6 May with the top eight teams at the end of this stage advancing to the knockout phase.

==== Standings ====
Pos	Team	Pld	W	D	L	GF	GA	GD	Pts	Qualification
1	Atlético Nacional	19	12	5	2	23	10	+13	41	Advance to the knockout phase
2	Independiente Medellín	19	11	2	6	32	23	+9	35	Advance to the knockout phase
3	Deportes Tolima	19	9	6	4	22	14	+8	33	Advance to the knockout phase
4	Atlético Huila	19	9	3	7	20	12	+8	30	Advance to the knockout phase
5	Junior	19	8	6	5	19	16	+3	30	Advance to the knockout phase
6	Deportivo Cali	19	9	2	8	26	17	+9	29	Advance to the knockout phase
7	Patriotas	19	8	5	6	17	18	−1	29	Advance to the knockout phase
8	Once Caldas	19	8	3	8	26	26	0	27	Advance to the knockout phase
9	Millonarios	19	7	5	7	19	18	+1	26	
10	Envigado	19	7	5	7	19	19	0	26	
11	La Equidad	19	6	7	6	18	15	+3	25	
12	Santa Fe	19	7	4	8	20	19	+1	25	
13	Rionegro Águilas	19	6	7	6	18	22	−4	25	
14	Jaguares	19	7	4	8	16	23	−7	25	
15	Alianza Petrolera	19	6	5	8	24	26	−2	23	
16	Atlético Bucaramanga	19	6	5	8	22	24	−2	23	
17	América de Cali	19	6	4	9	22	31	−9	22	
18	Deportivo Pasto	19	5	5	9	15	19	−4	20	
19	Boyacá Chicó	19	4	4	11	16	32	−16	16	
20	Leones	19	2	7	10	13	23	−10	13	

Source: Dimayor, Soccerway
Rules for classification: 1) Points, 2) Goal difference, 3) Goals for, 4) Away goals for, 5) Away goals against, 6) Drawing of lots.

==== Results ====
Home \ Away	APE	AME	BUC	HUI	NAC	BOY	TOL	CAL	PAS	ENV	DIM	JAG	JUN	EQU	LEO	MIL	ONC	PAT	RIO	SFE
Alianza Petrolera	—	—	—	2–1	1–2	—	—	—	0–2	—	2–2	4–0	—	—	1–0	—	4–1	—	2–0	2–1
América de Cali	2–1	—	2–1	—	—	3–0	1–1	2–1	—	0–1	—	—	2–2	1–1	—	—	—	2–0	—	—
Atlético Bucaramanga	4–1	—	—	0–1	0–0	—	—	—	3–1	—	2–4	—	—	—	2–2	—	1–2	—	2–2	1–0
Atlético Huila	—	4–0	—	—	—	0–1	0–0	1–0	2–0	—	—	1–2	1–0	3–1	—	—	—	2–0	—	—
Atlético Nacional	—	2–0	—	1–0	—	—	—	—	2–0	—	2–0	1–0	—	—	1–0	—	1–0	—	1–0	1–0
Boyacá Chicó	3–0	—	2–1	—	1–1	—	—	—	—	0–1	1–2	—	—	—	1–1	1–1	2–2	—	1–2	3–1
Deportes Tolima	3–1	—	0–1	—	0–1	1–0	—	0–1	—	2–1	—	—	2–1	4–1	—	1–0	—	—	—	0–0
Deportivo Cali	2–1	—	0–1	—	0–2	4–0	—	—	—	0–0	—	—	—	—	2–1	2–0	2–1	—	4–0	3–0
Deportivo Pasto	—	2–0	—	—	—	3–0	1–1	0–0	—	2–0	—	0–1	2–0	0–0	—	—	—	1–1	—	—
Envigado	0–0	—	1–1	0–3	2–2	—	—	—	—	—	2–0	—	—	—	1–1	—	1–0	—	2–0	0–3
Independiente Medellín	—	3–1	—	3–0	—	—	2–2	2–1	1–0	—	—	2–1	1–2	1–0	—	1–0	—	4–1	—	—
Jaguares	—	1–0	0–1	—	—	2–0	2–0	1–0	—	2–4	—	—	1–2	1–0	—	—	—	0–0	—	—
Junior	0–0	—	1–0	—	1–1	1–0	—	2–1	—	0–3	—	—	—	—	1–0	2–0	3–0	—	—	1–1
La Equidad	0–0	—	0–0	—	1–0	4–0	—	2–0	—	1–0	—	—	0–0	—	2–0	0–0	—	—	—	2–0
Leones	—	1–2	—	0–0	—	—	0–1	—	2–1	—	0–2	0–0	—	—	—	2–1	0–1	1–1	1–1	—
Millonarios	1–1	3–1	4–1	1–0	1–1	—	—	—	2–0	1–0	—	1–1	—	—	—	—	—	1–0	—	—
Once Caldas	—	2–2	—	1–0	—	—	0–1	—	3–0	—	3–2	2–0	—	3–2	—	0–1	—	2–0	1–2	—
Patriotas	2–1	—	1–0	—	3–1	2–0	0–0	1–3	—	1–0	—	—	1–0	0–0	—	—	—	—	—	—
Rionegro Águilas	—	2–1	—	0–0	—	—	1–3	—	0–0	—	2–0	1–1	0–0	2–1	—	3–1	—	0–1	—	—
Santa Fe	—	3–0	—	0–1	—	—	—	—	1–0	—	1–0	4–0	—	—	2–1	1–0	2–2	0–2	0–0	—

Source: Dimayor, Soccerway
Legend: Blue = home team win; Yellow = draw; Red = away team win.

=== Knockout phase bracket ===
Quarterfinals
1	Atlético Nacional	0	2	2
6	Deportivo Cali	1	0	1
4	Atlético Huila (p)	1	0	1 (3)
7	Patriotas	1	0	1 (1)
2	Indep. Medellín	1	2	3
5	Junior	0	2	2
3	Deportes Tolima	0	3	3
8	Once Caldas	1	0	1

Semifinals
1	Atlético Nacional (p)	0	0	0 (4)
4	Atlético Huila	0	0	0 (2)
2	Indep. Medellín	0	1	1 (3)
3	Deportes Tolima (p)	1	0	1 (5)

Finals
1	Atlético Nacional	1	1	2 (2)
3	Deportes Tolima (p)	0	2	2 (4)

=== Quarterfinals ===
Team 1	Agg.	Team 2	1st leg	2nd leg
Deportivo Cali	1–2	Atlético Nacional	1–0	0–2
Junior	2–3	Independiente Medellín	0–1	2–2
Once Caldas	1–3	Deportes Tolima	1–0	0–3
Patriotas	1–1 (1–3 p)	Atlético Huila	1–1	0–0

==== First leg ====
12 May 2018	Patriotas	1–1	Atlético Huila	Tunja
18:00	Rivas 21'	Report	López 90'	Stadium: Estadio La Independencia; Attendance: 2,500; Referee: Bismark Santiago

12 May 2018	Deportivo Cali	1–0	Atlético Nacional	Palmira
20:00	Benedetti 78'	Report		Stadium: Estadio Deportivo Cali; Attendance: 24,000; Referee: Nicolás Gallo

13 May 2018	Junior	0–1	Independiente Medellín	Barranquilla
17:15		Report	D. Moreno 58'	Stadium: Estadio Metropolitano Roberto Meléndez; Attendance: 16,309; Referee: John Hinestroza

13 May 2018	Once Caldas	1–0	Deportes Tolima	Manizales
19:30	Amaya 55'	Report		Stadium: Estadio Palogrande; Attendance: 9,500; Referee: Wilmar Roldán

==== Second leg ====
19 May 2018	Atlético Nacional	2–0 (2–1 agg.)	Deportivo Cali	Medellín
18:00	Moreno 51', 90+1' (pen.)	Report		Stadium: Estadio Atanasio Girardot; Attendance: 31,114; Referee: Gustavo Murillo

19 May 2018	Atlético Huila	0–0 (1–1 agg.) (3–1 p)	Patriotas	Neiva
20:00		Report		Stadium: Estadio Guillermo Plazas Alcid; Attendance: 2,000; Referee: Andrés Rojas
	Penalties
	Ramírez (penalty scored); López (penalty scored); Ordóñez (penalty scored)		(penalty scored) Velásquez; (penalty missed) Álvarez; (penalty missed) Rendón; (penalty missed) Malagón

20 May 2018	Deportes Tolima	3–0 (3–1 agg.)	Once Caldas	Ibagué
17:15	Albornoz 39'; Orozco 70'; Peralta 82' (o.g.)	Report		Stadium: Estadio Manuel Murillo Toro; Attendance: 15,000; Referee: Carlos Betancur

20 May 2018	Independiente Medellín	2–2 (3–2 agg.)	Junior	Medellín
19:30	Cano 30', 86'	Report	Hernández 18'; Chará 62'	Stadium: Estadio Atanasio Girardot; Attendance: 17,763; Referee: Luis Sánchez

=== Semifinals ===
Team 1	Agg.	Team 2	1st leg	2nd leg
Atlético Huila	0–0 (2–4 p)	Atlético Nacional	0–0	0–0
Deportes Tolima	1–1 (5–3 p)	Independiente Medellín	1–0	0–1

==== First leg ====
29 May 2018	Atlético Huila	0–0	Atlético Nacional	Bogotá
19:45		Report		Stadium: Estadio El Campín; Attendance: 29,308; Referee: Alexander Ospina

30 May 2018	Deportes Tolima	1–0	Independiente Medellín	Ibagué
19:30	Rodríguez 54'	Report		Stadium: Estadio Manuel Murillo Toro; Attendance: 16,000; Referee: John Hinestroza

==== Second leg ====
2 June 2018	Atlético Nacional	0–0 (0–0 agg.) (4–2 p)	Atlético Huila	Medellín
18:00		Report		Stadium: Estadio Atanasio Girardot; Attendance: 24,270; Referee: Carlos Betancur
	Penalties
	Moreno (penalty scored); Ramírez (penalty missed); Lucumí (penalty scored); Zúñiga (penalty scored); Castellani (penalty scored)		(penalty missed) Ramírez; (penalty scored) López; (penalty scored) Candelo; (penalty missed) Correa

3 June 2018	Independiente Medellín	1–0 (1–1 agg.) (3–5 p)	Deportes Tolima	Medellín
17:30	Castro 60'	Report		Stadium: Estadio Atanasio Girardot; Attendance: 18,398; Referee: Nicolás Gallo
	Penalties
	Ricaurte (penalty scored); D. Moreno (penalty scored); Calle (penalty scored); Anchico (penalty missed)		(penalty scored) Villa; (penalty scored) Pérez; (penalty scored) Carrascal; (penalty scored) Banguero; (penalty scored) Rodríguez

=== Finals ===
6 June 2018
19:30 UTC−5

Deportes Tolima	0–1	Atlético Nacional
	Report	Moreno 57'

Estadio Manuel Murillo Toro, Ibagué
Attendance: 25,000
Referee: Andrés Rojas

9 June 2018
19:15 UTC−5

Atlético Nacional	1–2	Deportes Tolima
Hernández 66'	Report	Campuzano 47' (o.g.); Banguero 90+4'
Penalties
Moreno (penalty scored); Henríquez (penalty scored); Lenis (penalty missed); Hernández (penalty missed)	2–4	(penalty scored) Villa; (penalty scored) Albornoz; (penalty scored) Banguero; (penalty scored) Pérez

Estadio Atanasio Girardot, Medellín
Attendance: 44,695
Referee: Luis Sánchez

Tied 2–2 on aggregate, Deportes Tolima won on penalties.

=== Top goalscorers ===
Rank	Name	Club	Goals
1	(Argentina) Germán Cano	Independiente Medellín	12
2	(Colombia) Dayro Moreno	Atlético Nacional	9
2	(Colombia) Iván Rivas	Patriotas	9
4	(Colombia) Omar Duarte	Atlético Huila	8
4	(Venezuela) Edder Farías	Once Caldas	8
4	(Colombia) Cristian Martínez Borja	América de Cali	8
4	(Colombia) Humberto Osorio	Rionegro Águilas	8
8	(Colombia) Edwar López	Atlético Huila	7
8	(Colombia) Yairo Moreno	Independiente Medellín	7
8	(Colombia) Carlos Peralta	La Equidad	7
8	(Argentina) José Sand	Deportivo Cali	7

Source: Dimayor

== Torneo Finalización ==
=== First stage ===
The First stage began on 20 July and featured the same format used in the Torneo Apertura, with reversed fixtures. It concluded on 11 November with the top eight teams at the end of this stage advancing to the knockout stage.

==== Standings ====
Pos	Team	Pld	W	D	L	GF	GA	GD	Pts	Qualification
1	Deportes Tolima	19	12	3	4	34	22	+12	39	Advance to the knockout phase
2	Once Caldas	19	10	6	3	25	16	+9	36	Advance to the knockout phase
3	La Equidad	19	11	3	5	22	14	+8	36	Advance to the knockout phase
4	Atlético Bucaramanga	19	11	2	6	25	20	+5	35	Advance to the knockout phase
5	Independiente Medellín	19	9	7	3	29	19	+10	34	Advance to the knockout phase
6	Junior	19	9	5	5	32	17	+15	32	Advance to the knockout phase
7	Rionegro Águilas	19	9	5	5	21	19	+2	32	Advance to the knockout phase
8	Santa Fe	19	8	7	4	27	13	+14	31	Advance to the knockout phase
9	Atlético Nacional	19	8	6	5	27	20	+7	30	
10	Deportivo Cali	19	8	5	6	19	15	+4	29	
11	Millonarios	19	6	7	6	23	23	0	25	
12	América de Cali	19	6	7	6	19	20	−1	25	
13	Envigado	19	5	5	9	20	28	−8	20	
14	Boyacá Chicó	19	5	5	9	19	28	−9	20	
15	Patriotas	19	5	5	9	17	26	−9	20	
16	Alianza Petrolera	19	6	1	12	22	33	−11	19	
17	Atlético Huila	19	4	6	9	13	22	−9	18	
18	Deportivo Pasto	19	3	6	10	11	21	−10	15	
19	Jaguares	19	3	5	11	13	29	−16	14	
20	Leones	19	1	6	12	15	28	−13	9	

Source: Dimayor, Soccerway
Rules for classification: 1) Points, 2) Goal difference, 3) Goals for, 4) Away goals for, 5) Away goals against, 6) Drawing of lots.

==== Results ====
Home \ Away	APE	AME	BUC	HUI	NAC	BOY	TOL	CAL	PAS	ENV	DIM	JAG	JUN	EQU	LEO	MIL	ONC	PAT	RIO	SFE
Alianza Petrolera	—	2–2	1–2	—	—	1–0	4–2	2–0	—	1–2	—	—	0–3	0–2	—	3–2	—	3–2	—	—
América de Cali	—	—	—	0–0	0–2	—	—	—	3–1	—	1–2	2–1	—	—	1–0	0–2	1–1	—	2–1	0–0
Atlético Bucaramanga	—	2–3	—	—	—	3–0	0–2	1–0	—	2–1	—	2–1	0–0	0–2	—	2–1	—	2–1	—	—
Atlético Huila	2–1	—	0–2	—	1–0	—	—	—	—	2–1	0–0	—	—	—	2–3	1–0	1–2	—	2–2	0–1
Atlético Nacional	3–2	—	2–3	—	—	3–2	1–2	0–0	—	3–1	—	—	1–0	0–0	—	1–1	—	0–0	—	—
Boyacá Chicó	—	2–1	—	2–2	—	—	2–1	1–1	1–1	—	—	1–0	2–1	0–1	—	—	—	1–1	—	—
Deportes Tolima	—	1–0	—	2–0	—	—	—	—	1–0	—	3–0	2–2	—	—	3–2	—	3–0	2–1	1–1	—
Deportivo Cali	—	1–0	—	1–0	—	—	0–1	—	1–0	—	3–2	4–0	1–0	3–0	—	—	—	0–2	—	—
Deportivo Pasto	2–1	—	0–1	0–0	0–2	—	—	—	—	—	1–1	—	—	—	2–1	0–1	0–0	—	0–1	1–1
Envigado	—	1–1	—	—	—	1–0	1–3	1–1	1–0	—	—	1–0	0–1	0–1	—	1–2	—	2–1	—	—
Independiente Medellín	2–0	—	2–0	—	2–1	2–0	—	—	—	2–2	—	—	—	—	1–1	—	2–2	—	1–0	2–2
Jaguares	1–0	—	—	0–0	1–1	—	—	—	0–2	—	0–2	—	—	—	2–0	1–2	0–1	—	2–2	0–0
Junior	—	0–0	—	3–0	—	—	4–3	—	3–0	—	2–1	1–2	—	3–1	—	—	—	4–0	2–0	—
La Equidad	—	1–2	—	1–0	—	—	0–1	—	1–0	—	1–1	2–0	—	—	—	—	1–1	4–0	0–2	—
Leones	0–1	—	0–1	—	2–2	1–2	—	0–0	—	1–1	—	—	2–2	0–1	—	—	—	—	—	0–2
Millonarios	—	—	—	—	—	2–2	1–1	0–0	—	—	0–1	—	1–1	2–3	1–0	—	2–2	—	1–1	0–3
Once Caldas	1–0	—	2–1	—	2–0	3–1	—	3–1	—	3–1	—	—	1–0	—	0–0	—	—	—	—	1–0
Patriotas	—	0–0	—	1–0	—	—	—	—	1–1	—	0–3	4–0	—	—	2–1	0–2	1–0	—	0–1	0–0
Rionegro Águilas	1–0	—	1–0	—	1–3	1–0	—	2–0	—	1–1	—	—	—	—	2–1	—	1–0	—	—	0–3
Santa Fe	4–0	—	1–1	—	0–2	2–0	3–0	0–2	—	3–1	—	—	2–2	0–1	—	—	—	—	—	—

Source: Dimayor, Soccerway
Legend: Blue = home team win; Yellow = draw; Red = away team win.

=== Knockout phase bracket ===
Quarterfinals
1	Deportes Tolima (p)	2	0	2 (4)
8	Santa Fe	1	1	2 (3)
4	Atlético Bucaramanga	0	2	2
5	Indep. Medellín	3	0	3
3	La Equidad	0	0	0
6	Junior	1	0	1
2	Once Caldas	0	1	1
7	Rionegro Águilas	1	1	2

Semifinals
1	Deportes Tolima	2	0	2
5	Indep. Medellín	2	2	4
6	Junior	3	1	4
7	Rionegro Águilas	2	1	3

Finals
5	Indep. Medellín	1	3	4
6	Junior	4	1	5

=== Quarterfinals ===
Team 1	Agg.	Team 2	1st leg	2nd leg
Santa Fe	2–2 (3–4 p)	Deportes Tolima	1–2	1–0
Rionegro Águilas	2–1	Once Caldas	1–0	1–1
Junior	1–0	La Equidad	1–0	0–0
Independiente Medellín	3–2	Atlético Bucaramanga	3–0	0–2

==== First leg ====
14 November 2018	Santa Fe	1–2	Deportes Tolima	Bogotá
20:00	Morelo 62'	Report	Cataño 14'; Pérez 29'	Stadium: Estadio El Campín; Attendance: 22,000; Referee: Nicolás Gallo

14 November 2018	Independiente Medellín	3–0	Atlético Bucaramanga	Medellín
20:00	Caicedo 5'; Ricaurte 33'; Cano 62'	Report		Stadium: Estadio Atanasio Girardot; Attendance: 22,000; Referee: Luis Sánchez

15 November 2018	Rionegro Águilas	1–0	Once Caldas	Rionegro
19:00	Arango 63'	Report		Stadium: Estadio Alberto Grisales; Attendance: 9,419; Referee: Mario Herrera

15 November 2018	Junior	1–0	La Equidad	Barranquilla
20:00	Díaz 82'	Report		Stadium: Estadio Metropolitano Roberto Meléndez; Attendance: 7,796; Referee: Wilmar Roldán

==== Second leg ====
17 November 2018	Atlético Bucaramanga	2–0 (2–3 agg.)	Independiente Medellín	Bucaramanga
18:00	Rovira 19'; Rangel 61'	Report		Stadium: Estadio Alfonso López; Attendance: 20,000; Referee: Gustavo Murillo

17 November 2018	Deportes Tolima	0–1 (2–2 agg.) (4–3 p)	Santa Fe	Ibagué
20:00		Report	Arboleda 21'	Stadium: Estadio Manuel Murillo Toro; Attendance: 20,000; Referee: Bismark Santiago
	Penalties
	(penalty scored) Carrascal; (penalty scored) Orozco; (penalty scored) Albornoz; (penalty scored) Banguero		(penalty scored) Morelo; (penalty missed) Guastavino; (penalty scored) Balanta; (penalty scored) Gordillo; (penalty missed) Henao

18 November 2018	Once Caldas	1–1 (1–2 agg.)	Rionegro Águilas	Manizales
17:15	Gómez 40'	Report	Velázquez 45'	Stadium: Estadio Palogrande; Attendance: 10,000; Referee: Luis Sánchez

18 November 2018	La Equidad	0–0 (0–1 agg.)	Junior	Bogotá
19:30		Report		Stadium: Estadio Metropolitano de Techo; Attendance: 5,000; Referee: Carlos Betancur

=== Semifinals ===
Team 1	Agg.	Team 2	1st leg	2nd leg
Independiente Medellín	4–2	Deportes Tolima	2–2	2–0
Rionegro Águilas	3–4	Junior	2–3	1–1

==== First leg ====
21 November 2018	Independiente Medellín	2–2	Deportes Tolima	Medellín
19:00	Angulo 48'; Caicedo 54'	Report	Pérez 8'; Carrascal 90'	Stadium: Estadio Atanasio Girardot; Attendance: 22,876; Referee: Carlos Betancur

22 November 2018	Rionegro Águilas	2–3	Junior	Rionegro
19:45	Ramírez 86'; Osorio 89' (pen.)	Report	Díaz 50', 70'; Barrera 53'	Stadium: Estadio Alberto Grisales; Attendance: 5,000; Referee: Andrés Rojas

==== Second leg ====
25 November 2018	Junior	1–1 (4–3 agg.)	Rionegro Águilas	Barranquilla
17:15	Sánchez 19'	Report	Muñoz 47'	Stadium: Estadio Metropolitano Roberto Meléndez; Attendance: 18,965; Referee: Mario Herrera

25 November 2018	Deportes Tolima	0–2 (2–4 agg.)	Independiente Medellín	Ibagué
19:30		Report	Cano 59'; Caicedo 76'	Stadium: Estadio Manuel Murillo Toro; Attendance: 25,000; Referee: Luis Sánchez

=== Finals ===
8 December 2018
19:00 UTC−5

Junior	4–1	Independiente Medellín
Díaz 50'; Sánchez 56'; T. Gutiérrez 81'; Piedrahita 88'	Report	Cano 66'

Estadio Metropolitano Roberto Meléndez, Barranquilla
Attendance: 40,072
Referee: John Hinestroza

16 December 2018
16:30 UTC−5

Independiente Medellín	3–1	Junior
Castro 45', 55'; Cano 80'	Report	González 71'

Estadio Atanasio Girardot, Medellín
Attendance: 43,445
Referee: Carlos Betancur

Junior won 5–4 on aggregate.

=== Top goalscorers ===
Rank	Name	Club	Goals
1	(Argentina) Germán Cano	Independiente Medellín	20
2	(Colombia) Marco Pérez	Deportes Tolima	17
3	(Colombia) Michael Rangel	Atlético Bucaramanga	11
4	(Colombia) Luis Díaz	Junior	10
4	(Colombia) Dayro Moreno	Atlético Nacional	10
4	(Colombia) Carlos Peralta	La Equidad	10
4	(Colombia) Diego Valdés	Boyacá Chicó	10
8	(Colombia) César Arias	Alianza Petrolera	8
8	(Colombia) David Lemos	Once Caldas	8
10	(Colombia) Jarlan Barrera	Junior	7
10	(Colombia) Juan Fernando Caicedo	Independiente Medellín	7
10	(Colombia) Wilson Morelo	Santa Fe	7

Source: Dimayor, Soccerway

== Aggregate table ==
Pos	Team	Pld	W	D	L	GF	GA	GD	Pts	Qualification
1	Independiente Medellín	48	25	11	12	76	54	+22	86	Qualification to Copa Libertadores second stage
2	Deportes Tolima (C)	48	25	10	13	66	46	+20	85	Qualification to Copa Libertadores group stage
3	Atlético Nacional	44	22	13	9	54	33	+21	79	Qualification to Copa Libertadores second stage (Note: Atlético Nacional qualified for the Copa Libertadores second stage by winning the 2018 Copa Colombia.)
4	Junior (C)	46	20	14	12	63	43	+20	74	Qualification to Copa Libertadores group stage
5	Once Caldas	42	19	10	13	53	47	+6	67	Qualification to Copa Sudamericana first stage
6	La Equidad	40	17	11	12	41	31	+10	62	Qualification to Copa Sudamericana first stage
7	Rionegro Águilas	42	16	14	12	44	46	−2	62	Qualification to Copa Sudamericana first stage
8	Deportivo Cali	40	18	7	15	46	34	+12	61	Qualification to Copa Sudamericana first stage
9	Atlético Bucaramanga	40	18	7	15	49	47	+2	61	
10	Santa Fe	40	16	11	13	49	34	+15	59	
11	Atlético Huila	42	13	13	16	34	35	−1	52	
12	Millonarios	38	13	12	13	42	41	+1	51	
13	Patriotas	40	13	12	15	35	45	−10	51	
14	América de Cali	38	12	11	15	41	51	−10	47	
15	Envigado	38	12	10	16	39	47	−8	46	
16	Alianza Petrolera	38	12	6	20	46	59	−13	42	
17	Jaguares	38	10	9	19	29	52	−23	39	
18	Boyacá Chicó	38	9	9	20	35	60	−25	36	
19	Deportivo Pasto	38	8	11	19	26	40	−14	35	
20	Leones	38	3	13	22	28	51	−23	22	

Source: Dimayor
Rules for classification: 1) Points, 2) Goal difference, 3) Goals for, 4) Away goals for, 5) Away goals against, 6) Drawing of lots.
(C) Champions

== Relegation ==
A separate table was kept to determine the teams that get relegated to the Categoría Primera B for the next season. The table included an average of all first stage games played for the current season and the previous two seasons. For purposes of elaborating the table, promoted teams were given the same point and goal tallies as the team in the 18th position at the start of the season.

Pos	Team	2016 Pts	2017 Pts	2018 Pts	Total Pts	Total Pld	Avg	Relegation
1	Atlético Nacional	76	87	71	234	118	1.983	
2	Independiente Medellín	73	69	69	211	118	1.788	
3	Santa Fe	70	67	56	193	118	1.636	
4	Millonarios	70	69	51	190	118	1.61	
5	Junior	65	62	62	189	118	1.602	
6	Deportes Tolima	57	53	72	182	118	1.542	
7	Deportivo Cali	66	53	58	177	118	1.5	
8	Atlético Bucaramanga	55	47	58	160	118	1.356	
9	La Equidad	42	53	61	156	118	1.322	
10	Once Caldas	51	42	63	156	118	1.322	
11	Rionegro Águilas	60	39	57	156	118	1.322	
12	Patriotas	61	45	49	155	118	1.314	
13	América de Cali	46	60	47	153	118	1.297	
14	Jaguares	46	59	39	144	118	1.22	
15	Envigado	51	44	46	141	118	1.195	
16	Atlético Huila	42	48	48	138	118	1.169	
17	Deportivo Pasto	44	56	35	135	118	1.144	
18	Alianza Petrolera	47	46	42	135	118	1.144	
19	Boyacá Chicó (R)	42	48	36	126	118	1.068	Relegation to Categoría Primera B
20	Leones (R)	42	48	22	112	118	0.949	Relegation to Categoría Primera B

Source: Dimayor
Rules for classification: 1st average; 2nd goal difference; 3rd number of goals scored; 4th away goals scored.

== See also ==
- 2018 Categoría Primera B season
- 2018 Copa Colombia
