= Independiente Valle del Cauca =

Colombian football club

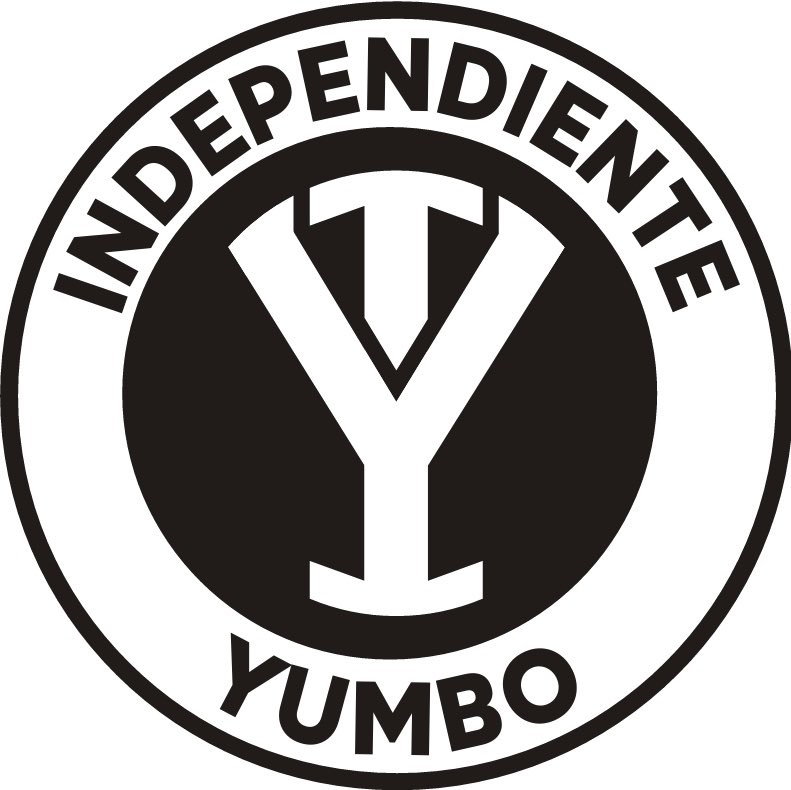
- Full name: Independiente Valle del Cauca S.A.
- Founded: 11 December 2025; 9 months ago
- Ground: Francisco Rivera Escobar; Deportivo Cali
- Capacity: 15,300; 42,000
- Owner(s): Sociedad Farlay S.A. (through Grupo Independiente) (95%); Other shareholders (5%)
- President: Maruán David Issa
- Head coach: Nicolás Serrano
Home colours	Away colours	Third colours

Independiente Valle del Cauca, known as Independiente Yumbo until July 2026, is a Colombian football club based in Palmira, Valle del Cauca. The club was founded on 11 December 2025, and competes in the Categoría Primera B, the second tier of Colombian football, beginning with the 2026 season. The club is the successor to Atlético Huila, following the transfer of the club's license by its owner, Sociedad Farlay S.A., also known as Grupo Independiente.

== History ==
On 13 November 2025, the board of directors of Atlético Huila formally requested the División Mayor del Fútbol Profesional Colombiano (Dimayor) to approve a change of name and headquarters to relocate to the municipality of Yumbo in Valle del Cauca. The move was prompted by the poor infrastructure conditions of Estadio Guillermo Plazas Alcid in Neiva.

After less than a month, at the clubs' assembly held in Medellín on 11 December 2025, Dimayor approved the move of Atlético Huila to Yumbo and the transfer of the club's license to become Independiente Yumbo del Valle, unofficially, starting from the 2026 season.

On 31 December 2025, through an official statement on Atlético Huila's social media accounts, the club's owners confirmed the official name of the new club as Independiente Yumbo for the 2026 season.

In its first season, Independiente Yumbo placed ninth in the first stage of the 2026–I Primera B tournament, failing to advance to the semifinal stage. On 3 July 2026 the club announced a new relocation ahead of the second half of the season, this time to Palmira, being rebranded to Independiente Valle del Cauca in the process.

== Players ==
=== Current squad ===
As of 28 September 2026

Note: Flags indicate national team as defined under FIFA eligibility rules; some limited exceptions apply. Players may hold more than one non-FIFA nationality.

No.	Pos.	Nation	Player
1	GK	COL	Juan Támara
2	DF	COL	Johan Lozano
3	DF	COL	Danny Ferrer
4	DF	COL	Julián Rodríguez
5	FW	COL	Jesús Díaz (on loan from Junior)
6	MF	ARG	Héctor Moreyra
7	FW	COL	Hugo Mena
8	MF	COL	Tomás Díaz
9	FW	COL	Alan García
11	FW	ARG	Lucas Farías
12	GK	COL	Luis Mena
14	MF	COL	José Ordóñez
15	DF	COL	Johan Perdomo
16	DF	COL	Heider De Arco

No.	Pos.	Nation	Player
17	MF	ECU	Luis Quiñonez
18	FW	COL	Matías Caicedo
19	FW	COL	Maicol Sequeda
20	MF	COL	Juan Rubiano
21	DF	COL	Jesús Rodríguez
22	GK	COL	Jeison Méndez
23	FW	COL	Johan Atehortúa
24	MF	COL	Breiner Moya
25	MF	COL	Francisco Peña
26	FW	COL	William López
27	DF	COL	José Ampudia
29	MF	COL	Juan Palacios
34	FW	COL	Jhon Pájaro
—	MF	COL	Santiago González

== Ownership ==
Independiente Valle del Cauca is owned by Sociedad Farlay S.A., also known as Grupo Independiente, which also owns Independiente del Valle of Ecuador as well as Spanish side Numancia. When it was still Atlético Huila, the club became the second Colombian team to be part of foreign multi-ownership after Millonarios.

The ownership group includes:

- (Ecuador) Independiente del Valle (2005–present)
- (Ecuador) Independiente Juniors (2007–present)
- (Spain) Numancia (2020–present)
- (Ecuador) Dragonas IDV (women's team, 2022–present)
