= 2026 Torneo DIMAYOR =

Football league season in Colombia

Torneo BetPlay DIMAYOR
- Season: 2026
- Dates: 23 January – December 2026
- Matches: 290
- Goals: 636 (2.19 per match)
- Top goalscorer: Torneo I: Fredy Montero (16 goals); Torneo II: Fredy Montero (12 goals)
- Biggest home win: R. Cartagena 5–0 Tigres (19 November)
- Biggest away win: Itagüí Leones 1–6 R. Cartagena (24 August)
- Highest scoring: Itagüí Leones 1–6 R. Cartagena (24 August); Ind. Valle del Cauca 4–3 Orsomarso (28 September)
- All statistics correct as of 19 November 2026.

The 2026 Torneo DIMAYOR (officially known as the 2026 Torneo BetPlay DIMAYOR season for sponsorship reasons) is the 37th season of the Torneo DIMAYOR since its founding as Colombia's second division football league. The season began on 23 January 2026.

== Teams ==
Sixteen teams take part in the season. The previous season's champions Jaguares and Cúcuta Deportivo were promoted to Liga DIMAYOR for the 2026 season after securing the top two places of the aggregate table, being replaced in Torneo DIMAYOR for this season by Envigado and Unión Magdalena, who were relegated from the first tier at the end of the 2025 season after finishing in the bottom two places of the relegation table.

Following the closure of Estadio Guillermo Plazas Alcid due to structural damage, the owners of Atlético Huila made a request to move from Neiva to Yumbo, Valle del Cauca, which was approved by the Assembly of Dimayor on 11 December 2025. As part of the agreement reached with the Yumbo Municipality, which requested the club not to use the Atlético Huila name and also due to the sale of the club's brand and colors to a local entrepreneur, a new club named Independiente Yumbo was presented on 1 January 2026. On 3 July 2026, Independiente Yumbo announced a new relocation, this time to Palmira, being rebranded to Independiente Valle del Cauca in the process.

In addition to this, Real Cundinamarca relocated to Mosquera, Cundinamarca following the completion of the construction of the town's municipal stadium, while Orsomarso returned to Yumbo for the second half of the 2026 season, after having played their home matches in Barrancabermeja for one year.

Locations of the 2026 Torneo DIMAYOR teams.

Club	City	Stadium	Capacity
Atlético	Cali	Pascual Guerrero	38,588
Barranquilla	Barranquilla	Romelio Martínez	8,600
Boca Juniors de Cali	Cali	Pascual Guerrero	38,588
Bogotá	Bogotá	Metropolitano de Techo	10,000
Bogotá	Bogotá	Parque Estadio Olaya Herrera	2,500
Deportes Quindío	Armenia	Centenario	20,716
Envigado	Envigado	Polideportivo Sur	11,000
Independiente Valle del Cauca (Note: Competed as Independiente Yumbo in the Torneo I.)	Yumbo	Municipal Raúl Miranda	3,500
Independiente Valle del Cauca	Palmira	Deportivo Cali	42,000
Independiente Valle del Cauca	Palmira	Francisco Rivera Escobar	15,300
Inter Palmira	Palmira	Francisco Rivera Escobar	15,300
Itagüí Leones	Itagüí	Metropolitano Ciudad de Itagüí	12,000
Orsomarso	Barrancabermeja	Daniel Villa Zapata	10,400
Orsomarso	Yumbo	Municipal Raúl Miranda	3,500
Patriotas	Tunja	La Independencia	20,630
Real Cartagena	Cartagena	Jaime Morón León	16,068
Real Cundinamarca	Mosquera	Municipal de Mosquera	5,440
Real Santander	Piedecuesta	Villa Concha	5,500
Tigres	Bogotá	Metropolitano de Techo	10,000
Tigres	Bogotá	Parque Estadio Olaya Herrera	2,500
Unión Magdalena	Santa Marta	Sierra Nevada	16,162

== Torneo I ==
The Torneo I, officially known as the Torneo BetPlay Dimayor 2026–I, was the first tournament of the 2026 season. It began on 23 January and ended on 29 May 2026. Envigado won the tournament after defeating Real Cartagena 4–3 on aggregate in the finals and qualified for the season's grand final.

=== First stage ===
==== Standings ====
Pos	Team	Pld	W	D	L	GF	GA	GD	Pts	Qualification
1	Inter Palmira	15	12	2	1	29	13	+16	38	Advance to the semi-finals
2	Unión Magdalena	15	10	2	3	27	15	+12	32	Advance to the semi-finals
3	Deportes Quindío	15	9	4	2	20	10	+10	31	Advance to the semi-finals
4	Envigado	15	9	2	4	24	14	+10	29	Advance to the semi-finals
5	Real Cartagena	15	7	5	3	23	15	+8	26	Advance to the semi-finals
6	Bogotá	15	6	5	4	16	14	+2	23	Advance to the semi-finals
7	Barranquilla	15	6	2	7	21	20	+1	20	Advance to the semi-finals
8	Tigres	15	5	5	5	15	14	+1	20	Advance to the semi-finals
9	Independiente Yumbo	15	4	7	4	13	14	−1	19	
10	Orsomarso	15	4	5	6	13	17	−4	17 (Note: Away goals for: Orsomarso 8, Patriotas 5.)	
11	Patriotas	15	4	5	6	13	17	−4	17	
12	Boca Juniors de Cali	15	2	7	6	15	20	−5	13	
13	Real Cundinamarca	15	2	7	6	14	19	−5	13	
14	Itagüí Leones	15	2	4	9	8	24	−16	10	
15	Atlético	15	1	6	8	12	23	−11	9	
16	Real Santander	15	1	4	10	9	23	−14	7	

Source: Dimayor, Soccerway
Rules for classification: 1) Points, 2) Goal difference, 3) Goals for, 4) Away goals for, 5) Goals against, 6) Away goals against, 7) Drawing of lots (or play-off matches, only if needed to decide eighth place).

==== Results ====
Home \ Away	ATL	BAR	BOC	BOG	QUI	ENV	INY	INT	LEO	ORS	PAT	RCA	RCU	RSA	TIG	MAG
Atlético	—	0–2	1–1	—	—	1–2	—	0–1	0–0	1–1	1–1	—	—	—	—	1–3
Barranquilla	—	—	—	1–1	—	1–2	—	0–4	3–0	1–2	2–0	—	—	2–0	—	1–3
Boca Juniors de Cali	—	0–2	—	—	0–1	—	0–0	—	2–1	2–2	—	1–1	1–1	—	—	—
Bogotá	1–0	—	2–1	—	0–2	—	—	1–2	—	2–0	—	0–1	2–2	—	0–1	—
Deportes Quindío	2–1	1–0	—	—	—	—	0–0	—	3–0	2–2	—	—	0–0	—	—	1–2
Envigado	—	—	1–0	1–2	1–2	—	2–0	—	—	—	2–0	1–1	—	—	0–0	—
Independiente Yumbo	1–1	1–0	—	1–1	—	—	—	—	—	—	2–1	1–1	1–1	1–1	—	0–2
Inter Palmira	—	—	2–1	—	1–2	2–1	1–0	—	—	—	3–1	—	—	1–0	2–1	—
Itagüí Leones	—	—	—	1–1	—	0–3	0–2	1–2	—	—	—	—	—	1–0	0–0	1–3
Orsomarso	—	—	—	—	—	0–1	2–0	1–2	0–0	—	0–0	—	—	2–0	—	0–1
Patriotas	—	—	3–3	0–1	0–0	—	—	—	1–0	—	—	1–0	1–0	2–0	—	—
Real Cartagena	4–1	1–3	—	—	2–1	—	—	2–2	2–3	4–0	—	—	1–0	—	—	2–1
Real Cundinamarca	1–2	2–2	—	—	—	0–2	—	2–2	2–0	1–0	—	—	—	—	0–2	—
Real Santander	1–1	—	1–1	1–2	1–2	1–3	—	—	—	—	—	0–1	2–1	—	1–1	—
Tigres	2–1	3–1	2–0	—	0–1	—	1–3	—	—	0–1	1–1	0–0	—	—	—	—
Unión Magdalena	—	—	0–2	0–0	—	4–2	—	0–2	—	—	2–1	—	1–1	2–0	3–1	—

Source: Dimayor, Soccerway
Legend: Blue = home team win; Yellow = draw; Red = away team win.

=== Semi-finals ===
The eight teams that advanced to the semi-finals were drawn into two groups of four teams, with the top two teams from the first stage being seeded in each group. The two group winners advanced to the finals.

==== Group A ====
Pos	Team	Pld	W	D	L	GF	GA	GD	Pts	Qualification	ENV	QUI	INT	TIG
1	Envigado	6	3	2	1	6	3	+3	11	Advance to the Finals	—	1–0	0–0	2–0
2	Deportes Quindío	6	3	1	2	4	3	+1	10		2–1	—	0–1	1–0
3	Inter Palmira	6	1	4	1	3	3	0	7		0–0	0–0	—	2–2
4	Tigres	6	1	1	4	4	8	−4	4		1–2	0–1	1–0	—

Source: Dimayor, Soccerway
Legend: Blue = home team win; Yellow = draw; Red = away team win.
Rules for classification: 1) Points, 2) First stage position (only applies for the seeded team, and only if it is involved in a tie for first place), 3) Goal difference, 4) Goals for, 5) Away goals for, 6) Away goals against, 7) First stage position.

==== Group B ====
Pos	Team	Pld	W	D	L	GF	GA	GD	Pts	Qualification	RCA	MAG	BAR	BOG
1	Real Cartagena	6	4	1	1	8	6	+2	13	Advance to the Finals	—	2–1	2–1	2–0
2	Unión Magdalena	6	2	3	1	8	4	+4	9		3–0	—	2–0	0–0
3	Barranquilla	6	1	3	2	5	6	−1	6		0–0	1–1	—	2–0
4	Bogotá	6	0	3	3	3	8	−5	3		1–2	1–1	1–1	—

Source: Dimayor, Soccerway
Legend: Blue = home team win; Yellow = draw; Red = away team win.
Rules for classification: 1) Points, 2) First stage position (only applies for the seeded team, and only if it is involved in a tie for first place), 3) Goal difference, 4) Goals for, 5) Away goals for, 6) Away goals against, 7) First stage position.

=== Finals ===
25 May 2026
20:00 UTC−5

Real Cartagena	2–3	Envigado
Montero 43', 48'	Report	Marulanda 33', 61' (pen.), 68'

Estadio Jaime Morón León, Cartagena
Referee: Diego Ulloa

29 May 2026
15:00 UTC−5

Envigado	1–1	Real Cartagena
Acuña 14'	Report	Montero 90' (pen.)

Estadio Polideportivo Sur, Envigado
Referee: Jhon Ospina

Envigado won 4–3 on aggregate and advanced to the grand final.

=== Top scorers ===
Rank	Player	Club	Goals
1	(Colombia) Fredy Montero	Real Cartagena	16
2	(Colombia) Andrés Carreño	Unión Magdalena	15
3	(Colombia) Mauro Manotas	Real Cartagena	10
4	(Colombia) Miguel Marulanda	Envigado	8
5	(Colombia) José David Lloreda	Deportes Quindío	7
6	(Colombia) Jown Cardona	Inter Palmira	6
6	(Colombia) Cristian Iguarán	Unión Magdalena	6
8	(Colombia) Kevin Álvarez	Patriotas	5
8	(Argentina) Lucas Farías	Independiente Yumbo	5
8	(Colombia) Harold Ortiz	Boca Juniors de Cali	5
8	(Colombia) Diego Castillo	Bogotá	5
8	(Colombia) Kener González	Inter Palmira	5
8	(Venezuela) Freddy Molina	Unión Magdalena	5
8	(Colombia) Cristian Peñate	Barranquilla	5
8	(Colombia) Orles Aragón	Tigres	5
8	(Colombia) Andrés Carabalí	Deportes Quindío	5

Source: Dimayor

== Torneo II ==
The Torneo II, officially known as the Torneo BetPlay Dimayor 2026–II, is the second and final tournament of the 2026 season. It began on 24 July and is scheduled to end on 24 November 2026. The winners will qualify for the season's grand final.

=== First stage ===
==== Standings ====
Pos	Team	Pld	W	D	L	GF	GA	GD	Pts	Qualification
1	Independiente Valle del Cauca	15	8	4	3	20	9	+11	28	Advance to the semi-finals
2	Real Cundinamarca	15	8	4	3	20	11	+9	28	Advance to the semi-finals
3	Tigres	15	6	6	3	16	9	+7	24	Advance to the semi-finals
4	Deportes Quindío	15	6	5	4	14	13	+1	23	Advance to the semi-finals
5	Real Cartagena	15	5	6	4	26	18	+8	21	Advance to the semi-finals
6	Boca Juniors de Cali	15	6	3	6	20	20	0	21	Advance to the semi-finals
7	Envigado	15	4	8	3	17	13	+4	20	Advance to the semi-finals
8	Unión Magdalena	15	5	5	5	15	15	0	20	Advance to the semi-finals
9	Real Santander	15	4	8	3	17	20	−3	20	
10	Bogotá	15	4	6	5	11	14	−3	18	
11	Atlético	15	5	3	7	16	21	−5	18	
12	Patriotas	15	5	3	7	17	23	−6	18	
13	Orsomarso	15	4	5	6	11	14	−3	17	
14	Inter Palmira	15	4	4	7	11	17	−6	16	
15	Barranquilla	15	3	5	7	18	22	−4	14	
16	Itagüí Leones	15	3	5	7	12	22	−10	14	

Source: Dimayor, Soccerway
Rules for classification: 1) Points, 2) Goal difference, 3) Goals for, 4) Away goals for, 5) Goals against, 6) Away goals against, 7) Drawing of lots (or play-off matches, only if needed to decide eighth place).

==== Results ====
Home \ Away	ATL	BAR	BOC	BOG	QUI	ENV	IVC	INT	LEO	ORS	PAT	RCA	RCU	RSA	TIG	MAG
Atlético	—	—	—	2–1	0–1	—	0–2	—	—	—	—	2–2	1–2	2–2	0–3	—
Barranquilla	2–2	—	2–1	—	4–1	—	0–2	—	—	—	—	1–1	0–1	—	2–2	—
Boca Juniors de Cali	0–1	—	—	1–2	—	2–2	—	2–1	—	—	4–1	—	—	2–0	0–0	1–1
Bogotá	—	2–1	—	—	—	3–3	0–2	—	0–1	—	0–0	—	—	1–1	—	1–0
Deportes Quindío	—	—	0–1	1–0	—	1–0	—	1–1	—	—	1–2	1–1	—	0–0	2–0	—
Envigado	3–0	1–0	—	—	—	—	—	1–1	1–1	0–0	—	—	1–0	1–1	—	0–1
Independiente Valle del Cauca	—	—	3–0	—	0–0	1–1	—	0–1	1–0	4–3	—	—	—	—	1–1	—
Inter Palmira	0–1	1–0	—	0–0	—	—	—	—	1–0	1–1	—	2–1	0–2	—	—	0–1
Itagüí Leones	0–3	1–1	1–2	—	1–1	—	—	—	—	1–2	1–0	1–6	1–1	—	—	—
Orsomarso	0–2	1–0	1–0	0–1	0–1	—	—	—	—	—	—	0–1	2–0	—	0–2	—
Patriotas	2–0	3–1	—	—	—	0–2	0–1	3–1	—	1–1	—	—	—	—	1–0	1–2
Real Cartagena	—	—	2–3	2–0	—	0–0	0–2	—	—	—	3–0	—	—	5–1	0–3	—
Real Cundinamarca	—	—	3–1	0–0	3–1	—	1–0	—	—	—	4–1	1–1	—	0–1	—	2–1
Real Santander	—	2–2	—	—	—	—	1–0	3–1	1–0	0–0	2–2	—	—	—	—	1–3
Tigres	—	—	—	0–0	—	2–1	—	1–0	0–1	—	—	—	0–0	1–1	—	1–0
Unión Magdalena	1–0	1–2	—	—	0–2	—	1–1	—	2–2	0–0	—	1–1	—	—	—	—

Source: Dimayor, Soccerway
Legend: Blue = home team win; Yellow = draw; Red = away team win.

=== Semi-finals ===
The eight teams that advanced to the semi-finals were drawn into two groups of four teams, with the top two teams from the first stage being seeded in each group. The two group winners advanced to the finals.

==== Group A ====
Pos	Team	Pld	W	D	L	GF	GA	GD	Pts	Qualification	BOC	ENV	MAG	IVC
1	Boca Juniors de Cali	6	3	1	2	9	8	+1	10	Advance to the Finals	—	1–0	1–1	1–2
2	Envigado	6	2	2	2	8	6	+2	8		2–0	—	2–3	2–0
3	Unión Magdalena	6	1	4	1	7	7	0	7		1–2	1–1	—	1–1
4	Independiente Valle del Cauca	6	1	3	2	6	9	−3	6		2–4	1–1	0–0	—

Source: Dimayor, Soccerway
Legend: Blue = home team win; Yellow = draw; Red = away team win.
Rules for classification: 1) Points, 2) First stage position (only applies for the seeded team, and only if it is involved in a tie for first place), 3) Goal difference, 4) Goals for, 5) Away goals for, 6) Away goals against, 7) First stage position.

==== Group B ====
Pos	Team	Pld	W	D	L	GF	GA	GD	Pts	Qualification	QUI	RCA	RCU	TIG
1	Deportes Quindío	6	4	0	2	8	5	+3	12	Advance to the Finals	—	0–1	2–0	1–0
2	Real Cartagena	6	3	2	1	11	5	+6	11		2–3	—	1–0	5–0
3	Real Cundinamarca	6	1	2	3	4	7	−3	5		0–2	2–2	—	0–0
4	Tigres	6	1	2	3	2	8	−6	5		2–0	0–0	0–2	—

Source: Dimayor, Soccerway
Legend: Blue = home team win; Yellow = draw; Red = away team win.
Rules for classification: 1) Points, 2) First stage position (only applies for the seeded team, and only if it is involved in a tie for first place), 3) Goal difference, 4) Goals for, 5) Away goals for, 6) Away goals against, 7) First stage position.

=== Finals ===
23 November 2026
19:30 UTC−5

Boca Juniors de Cali	v	Deportes Quindío

Estadio Pascual Guerrero, Cali

28 November 2026
16:30 UTC−5

Deportes Quindío	v	Boca Juniors de Cali

Estadio Centenario, Armenia

=== Top scorers ===
As of 19 November 2026

Rank	Player	Club	Goals
1	(Colombia) Fredy Montero	Real Cartagena	12
2	(Colombia) Alejandro Oñate	Atlético	9
3	(Colombia) Jhon Aponzá	Boca Juniors de Cali	8
4	(Colombia) Kevin Álvarez	Patriotas	7
4	(Colombia) Miguel Marulanda	Envigado	7
4	(Colombia) Deiman Cortés	Boca Juniors de Cali	7
7	(Colombia) Cristian Rodríguez	Itagüí Leones	6
7	(Colombia) Michell Díaz	Real Santander	6
7	(Colombia) Ruyery Blanco	Unión Magdalena	6
7	(Colombia) Janeth Alemán	Real Cartagena	6
7	(Colombia) Mauro Manotas	Real Cartagena	6
7	(Colombia) José David Lloreda	Deportes Quindío	6

Source: BeSoccer

== Aggregate table ==
The results of all stages of both of the season's tournaments are combined into a single table. The best-placed team in this table at the end of the season will be assured of qualification for the promotion play-off, and if any or both of the tournament winners place in the top two of this table, they will earn promotion to Liga DIMAYOR for the following season.

Pos	Team	Pld	W	D	L	GF	GA	GD	Pts	Qualification
1	Deportes Quindío (X)	42	22	10	10	46	31	+15	76	Advance to the promotion play-off
2	Real Cartagena	44	19	15	10	71	48	+23	72	
3	Envigado (X)	44	19	15	10	59	39	+20	72	
4	Unión Magdalena	42	18	14	10	57	41	+16	68	
5	Inter Palmira	36	17	10	9	43	33	+10	61	
6	Independiente Valle del Cauca	36	13	14	9	39	32	+7	53	
7	Tigres	42	13	14	15	37	39	−2	53	
8	Real Cundinamarca	36	11	13	12	38	37	+1	46	
9	Boca Juniors de Cali	36	11	11	14	44	48	−4	44	
10	Bogotá	36	10	14	12	30	36	−6	44	
11	Barranquilla	36	10	10	16	44	48	−4	40	
12	Patriotas	30	9	8	13	30	40	−10	35	
13	Orsomarso	30	8	10	12	24	31	−7	34	
14	Atlético	30	6	9	15	28	44	−16	27	
15	Real Santander	30	5	12	13	26	43	−17	27	
16	Itagüí Leones	30	5	9	16	20	46	−26	24	

Updated to match(es) played on 19 November 2026. Source: Dimayor
Rules for classification: 1) Points, 2) Goal difference, 3) Goals for, 4) Away goals for, 5) Goals against, 6) Away goals against, 7) Drawing of lots.
(X) Assured of the promotion play-off, but may still earn direct promotion.

== See also ==
- 2026 Liga DIMAYOR
- 2026 Copa Colombia
