= Pedro Felício Santos =

Portuguese football manager

Personal information
- Full name: Pedro Felipe Da Cruz Felício Santos
- Date of birth: 9 May 1980 (age 46)
- Place of birth: Pombal, Portugal

Managerial career
- Years: Team
- 2017: Pinhalnovense
- 2017–2018: Millonarios U17
- 2018: América de Cali

Pedro Felipe Da Cruz Felício Santos (born 9 May 1980) is a Portuguese football manager.

== Career ==
After working for nearly 20 years in youth football, Santos started his managerial career with Portuguese third tier side Pinhalnovense. In 2017 he arrived in Colombia to manage the U17 squad of Millonarios, and the following year he was appointed manager of América de Cali in the Colombian top flight. He was dismissed by América on 19 August 2018, after a poor start to the 2018 Finalización tournament.

After five years without managing, on 29 June 2023 he was announced as the new manager of Bogotá in the Colombian second tier competition Categoría Primera B. However, he had to leave the job on 26 July due to documentation issues.
