= Edwar López =

Colombian footballer (born 1995)

Personal information
- Full name: Edwar Manuel López Gómez
- Date of birth: 9 May 1995 (age 31)
- Place of birth: Apartadó, Colombia
- Position: Forward

Team information
- Current team: Santa Fe
- Number: 28

Youth career
- Dim Uraba
- Atlético Nacional
- Sampema
- Sportiva Camilo Zuniga

Senior career*
Years	Team	Apps	(Gls)
2015	América Pedro Sellares		
2015–2016	Sanjoanense	28	(6)
2016	Lusitano VRSA	10	(3)
2017	Orsomarso	30	(1)
2018	Atlético Huila	36	(13)
2019	Estudiantes	19	(2)
2020	Argentinos Juniors	3	(1)
2021–2022	Olimpia	7	(0)
2021–2022	→ Independiente Medellín (loan)	15	(1)
2022	Once Caldas	14	(4)
2023	Deportivo Pasto	42	(10)
2024	América de Cali	14	(2)
2024–	Santa Fe	57	(2)
- * Club domestic league appearances and goals as of 11 December 2025

Edwar Manuel López Gómez (born 9 May 1995) is a Colombian professional footballer who plays as a forward for Santa Fe.

== Career ==
López had youth stints with Dim Uraba, Atlético Nacional, Sampema and Sportiva Camilo Zuniga prior to beginning his senior career with América Pedro Sellares in 2015. Later that year, he moved to Portugal with Sanjoanense, making his bow in the Campeonato de Portugal on 20 September during a win away to over Bustelo; he also scored his first goal in the process, netting an 89th-minute winner as Sanjoanense won 1–2. Five further goals followed for López in the 2015–16 season. Ahead of 2016–17, López joined Lusitano VRSA. He again netted on his debut against Armacenenses, on the way to three across ten games.

In February 2017, López agreed to join Categoría Primera B's Orsomarso of Colombia. A year after, López secured a move to Categoría Primera A's Atlético Huila. Having participated in thirty-six fixtures and scored thirteen times in all competitions in 2018, López signed a pre-contract with Argentine Primera División side Estudiantes on 27 November; effective from January 2019.

== Career statistics ==
As of 1 January 2019.

Club statistics
Club	Season	League			Cup (Note: Includes the Copa Colombia)		League Cup		Continental		Other		Total	
Club	Season	Division	Apps	Goals	Apps	Goals	Apps	Goals	Apps	Goals	Apps	Goals	Apps	Goals
Sanjoanense	2015–16	Campeonato de Portugal	28	6	0	0	—		—		0	0	28	6
Lusitano VRSA	2016–17	Campeonato de Portugal	10	3	0	0	—		—		0	0	10	3
Orsomarso	2017	Categoría Primera B	29	1	3	1	—		—		1 (Note: One appearance in the 2017 Categoría Primera B play-offs)	0	33	2
Atlético Huila	2018	Categoría Primera A	32	12	0	0	—		—		4 (Note: Four appearances in the 2018 Categoría Primera A play-offs)	1 (Note: One goal in the 2018 Categoría Primera A play-offs)	36	13
Estudiantes	2018–19	Primera División	0	0	0	0	—		—		0	0	0	0
Career total			99	22	3	1	—		—		5	1	107	24
