= Jesús Díaz (footballer, born 2004) =

Colombian footballer (born 2004)

Personal information
- Full name: Jesús Manuel Díaz Marulanda
- Date of birth: 14 May 2004 (age 22)
- Place of birth: Barrancas, La Guajira, Colombia
- Height: 1.72 m (5 ft 8 in)
- Position: Forward

Team information
- Current team: Atlético Junior
- Number: 90

Youth career
- Barranquilla

Senior career*
Years	Team	Apps	(Gls)
2021–2024	Barranquilla	56	(1)
2022–2023	→ Porto B (loan)	1	(0)
2025–	Atlético Junior	2	(0)

International career
2019	Colombia U15	4	(1)
2020	Colombia U16	3	(0)
- * Club domestic league appearances and goals as of 15 May 2025

Jesús Manuel Díaz Marulanda (born 14 May 2004) is a Colombian footballer who plays as a forward for Atlético Junior.

== Club career ==
Born in Barrancas, La Guajira, Díaz made his professional debut for Barranquilla at the age of sixteen.

In July 2022, Díaz joined Porto on loan, with an option to buy. He was immediately involved in the club's 'B' team's pre-season, playing in games against the reserves of Monaco and Celta de Vigo.

== Personal life ==
Díaz is the brother of fellow professional footballer Luis Díaz who plays for Bayern Munich.

He is of Wayuu origin. On 28 October 2023, Díaz's mother Cilenis Marulanda and father Luis Manuel "Mane" Díaz were kidnapped by armed men on motorcycles at a gas station in their hometown of Barrancas. His mother was rescued by police a day later, with a "major military search" announced to locate his father. Colombian President Gustavo Petro claimed "all the public forces have been deployed" and the following day, General William Rene Salamanca announced a reward of up to 200 million pesos for information on Díaz's father's whereabouts. Mane Díaz was released by the kidnappers on 9 November.

== Career statistics ==
=== Club ===
As of 16 August 2022.

Club	Season	League			Cup		Continental		Other		Total	
Club	Season	Division	Apps	Goals	Apps	Goals	Apps	Goals	Apps	Goals	Apps	Goals
Barranquilla	2021	Categoría Primera B	16	1	2 (Note: Appearances in the Copa Colombia)	1	–		0	0	18	2
Barranquilla	2022	Categoría Primera B	11	0	2	0	–		0	0	13	0
Barranquilla	Total		27	1	4	1	0	0	0	0	31	2
Porto B (loan)	2022–23	Liga Portugal 2	1	0	–		–		0	0	1	0
Career total			28	1	4	1	0	0	0	0	32	2
