= Fredy Valencia =

Colombian footballer (born 2001)

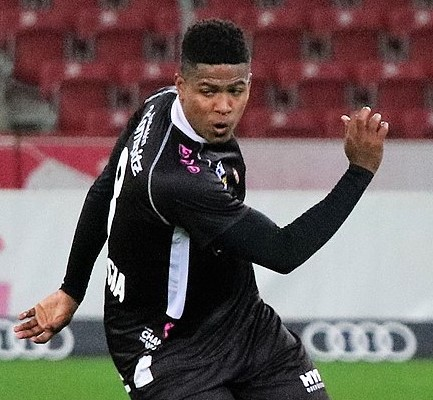

Personal information
- Full name: Fredy Alexander Valencia Ramos
- Date of birth: 16 August 2001 (age 25)
- Place of birth: Bello, Colombia
- Height: 1.82 m (5 ft 11 1/2 in)
- Position: Midfielder

Team information
- Current team: Deportes Quindío
- Number: 8

Youth career
- –2018: Boca Juniors de Cali

Senior career*
Years	Team	Apps	(Gls)
2018–2020	Boca Juniors de Cali	44	(1)
2020–2023	LASK	1	(0)
2020–2022	→ Juniors OÖ (loan)	43	(0)
2023–	Deportes Quindío	56	(3)
- * Club domestic league appearances and goals as of 5 October 2026

Fredy Alexander Valencia Ramos (born 16 August 2001) is a Colombian footballer who plays as a midfielder for Categoría Primera B club Deportes Quindío.

== Career statistics ==
=== Club ===
As of 30 September 2020.

Club	Season	League			Cup		Other		Total	
Club	Season	Division	Apps	Goals	Apps	Goals	Apps	Goals	Apps	Goals
Boca Juniors de Cali	2018	Categoría Primera B	13	0	4 (Note: Appearances in the Copa Colombia)	0	0	0	17	0
Boca Juniors de Cali	2019	Categoría Primera B	25	1	4	0	0	0	29	1
Boca Juniors de Cali	2020	Categoría Primera B	6	0	1	0	0	0	7	0
Boca Juniors de Cali	Total		44	1	9	0	0	0	53	1
LASK	2020–21	Austrian Bundesliga	0	0	0	0	0	0	0	0
Juniors OÖ (loan)	2020–21	2. Liga	2	0	0	0	0	0	2	0
Career total			46	1	9	0	0	0	55	1
