= Agustín Julio =

Colombian footballer (born 1974)

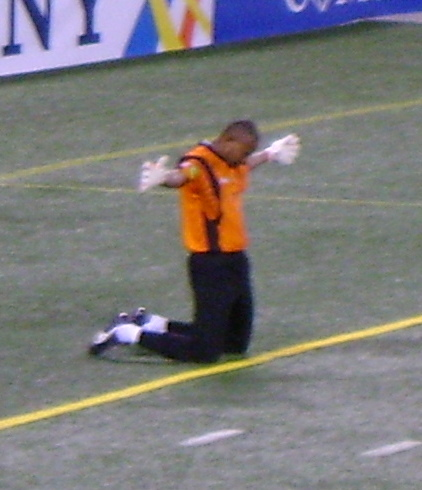

Personal information
- Full name: Agustín Julio Castro
- Date of birth: October 25, 1974 (age 51)
- Place of birth: Cartagena, Colombia
- Height: 1.92 m (6 ft 4 in)
- Position: Goalkeeper

Senior career*
Years	Team	Apps	(Gls)
1997–2004	Santa Fe	112	(0)
2000	→ Atlético Junior (loan)	46	(0)
2002	→ Once Caldas (loan)	20	(0)
2002	→ Medellín (loan)	4	(0)
2004	Unión Magdalena	0	(0)
2005–2007	Deportes Tolima	138	(0)
2008–2011	Santa Fe	78	(0)

International career
1999–2009	Colombia	29	(0)

Managerial career
- 2016: Santa Fe (interim)
- 2017: Santa Fe (women)
- 2018: Santa Fe (interim)
- * Club domestic league appearances and goals

Agustín Julio Castro (born 25 October 1974) is a Colombian Association football former player, who played as a goalkeeper.

== International career ==
Julio used to be the number one choice goalkeeper for the Colombia national football team. He had won his position after the previous first-choice keeper Miguel Calero allowed nine goals in two games. In his stint as keeper, he saved Colombia many times during the first two games of qualifiers against Brazil and Bolivia, and was referred to as San Agustín.

Julio was captain of Colombia for nine out of the first 11 qualifying games of the 2010 FIFA World Cup qualification. He had a successful start to his captaincy reign with a huge win over Argentina. However questions were raised about Julio's captaincy after a 4–0 defeat to Chile. The captaincy and Julio's place in the team were soon lost after this defeat.

However, in a shocking turnaround Agustín Julio managed to regain his place in the Colombian side in the match against Ecuador. Julio's Colombian side won the match 2–0 which took the side back into the playoff positions. Julio made a critical save in the 72nd minute of the match when Colombia when the score was still 0–0, and he managed to save a low-shot with his feet from point-blank range.

Agustin Julio remained a popular figurehead in Colombia, with fans petitioning on internet sites to re-instate Julio back in the team, and after a great performance during the first four games of qualifiers he was rated the 15th best keeper in the world.

Julio is the great-uncle of Wolves and FC Cincinnati defender, Yerson Mosquera.
