= Jaime Alvarado =

Colombian footballer (born 1999)

Personal information
- Full name: Jaime Alberto Alvarado Hoyos
- Date of birth: 26 July 1999 (age 27)
- Place of birth: Santa Marta, Colombia
- Height: 1.81 m (5 ft 11 in)
- Position: Midfielder

Team information
- Current team: Once Caldas (on loan from Independiente Medellin)
- Number: 15

Youth career
- –2016: Udinese Calcio Colombia
- 2016–2017: Watford
- 2017: → Granada (loan)

Senior career*
Years	Team	Apps	(Gls)
2017–2022	Watford	0	(0)
2017–2018	→ Valladolid B (loan)	27	(0)
2018–2020	→ Hércules (loan)	17	(0)
2020	→ Badalona (loan)	3	(0)
2020–2021	→ Athletico Paranaense (loan)	14	(0)
2021–2022	→ Racing Ferrol (loan)	0	(0)
2022	Fortaleza	39	(4)
2023–	Independiente Medellin	124	(0)
2026–	→ Once Caldas	0	(0)

International career
2019	Colombia U20	11	(0)
2019–2020	Colombia U23	8	(0)
- * Club domestic league appearances and goals as of 11 December 2025

Jaime Alberto Alvarado Hoyos (born 26 July 1999) is a Colombian professional footballer who plays as a midfielder for Once Caldas, on loan from Independiente Medellín.

== Club career ==
Born in Santa Marta, Alvarado joined Watford in 2016, after coming through an Udinese Calcio academy based in Colombia. On 17 July 2017, after spending the previous six months on loan at Granada CF's youth setup, he joined Segunda División B side Real Valladolid B on loan for one year.

Alvarado made his senior debut on 19 August 2017, starting in a 1–1 home draw against AD Unión Adarve, and finished the season with 27 appearances. He remained in the Spanish second division in the following two seasons, serving loan stints at Hércules CF and CF Badalona.

On 23 July 2020, Alvarado moved to Série A side Athletico Paranaense on loan until June 2021. He made his debut for the club on 6 September, coming on as a second-half substitute for Richard in a 1–0 away loss against Vasco da Gama.

On 31 August 2021, Alvarado signed for Racing Ferrol on a season-long loan deal.

== Career statistics ==
As of 28 March 2021

Appearances and goals by club, season and competition
Club	Season	League			Cup		Continental		Other		Total	
Club	Season	Division	Apps	Goals	Apps	Goals	Apps	Goals	Apps	Goals	Apps	Goals
Watford	2017–18	Premier League	0	0	0	0	—		—		0	0
Watford	2018–19	Premier League	0	0	0	0	—		—		0	0
Watford	2019–20	Premier League	0	0	0	0	—		—		0	0
Watford	2020–21	Championship	0	0	0	0	—		—		0	0
Watford	Total		0	0	0	0	0	0	0	0	0	0
Valladolid B (loan)	2017–18	Segunda División B	27	0	—		—		—		27	0
Hércules (loan)	2018–19	Segunda División B	11	0	0	0	—		2	0	13	0
Hércules (loan)	2019–20	Segunda División B	6	0	0	0	—		—		6	0
Hércules (loan)	Total		17	0	0	0	0	0	2	0	19	0
Badalona (loan)	2019–20	Segunda División B	3	0	—		—		—		3	0
Athletico Paranaense (loan)	2020	Série A	14	0	1	0	1 (Note: Appearance(s) in Copa Libertadores)	0	—		16	0
Athletico Paranaense (loan)	2021	Série A	0	0	0	0	0	0	0	0	0	0
Athletico Paranaense (loan)	Total		14	0	1	0	1	0	0	0	16	0
Career total			61	0	1	0	1	0	2	0	65	0
