= 1989 Campeonato Profesional =

Campeonato Profesional
- Season: 1989
- Champions: None
- Matches: 318
- Goals: 729 (2.29 per match)

The 1989 Campeonato Profesional was the 42nd season of Colombia's top-flight football league. The season was cancelled after 318 matches because of the assassination of referee Álvaro Ortega on October 1 in Medellín. No champion was declared and no teams qualified for international competitions for the following season (however Atlético Nacional played the 1990 Copa Libertadores as champion of the previous edition).

== League system ==
The season consisted in six phases. The first phase, Torneo Apertura, had a round-robin format. The second phase consisted in a Pentagonal (three groups of five teams each one, playing against each other at home and away). The third phase, Torneo Finalización, had a similar format that Torneo Apertura. The fourth phase, Cuadrangular Inicial, consisted in two groups of four teams each one, playing against each other at home and away. The others phases, Repechaje and the finals, were not played due to the cancellation of the tournament.

Teams received two points for a win and one point for a draw. If two or more teams were tied on points, places were determined by goal difference.

== Teams ==
Locations of the 1956 Campeonato Profesional teams:

1. Armenia
2. Barranquilla
3. Bogotá
4. Bucaramanga

5. Cali
6. Cúcuta
7. Ibagué
8. Manizales

9. Medellín
10. Pereira
11. Santa Marta

Team	City	Stadium
América	Cali	Estadio Olímpico Pascual Guerrero
Atlético Bucaramanga	Bucaramanga	Estadio Alfonso López
Atlético Nacional	Medellín	Estadio Atanasio Girardot
Cúcuta Deportivo	Cúcuta	Estadio General Santander
Deportes Quindío	Armenia	Estadio Centenario
Deportes Tolima	Ibagué	Estadio Manuel Murillo Toro
Deportivo Cali	Cali	Estadio Olímpico Pascual Guerrero
Deportivo Pereira	Pereira	Estadio Hernán Ramírez Villegas
Independiente Medellín	Medellín	Estadio Atanasio Girardot
Junior	Barranquilla	Estadio Metropolitano Roberto Meléndez
Millonarios	Bogotá	Estadio El Campín
Once Caldas	Manizales	Estadio Palogrande
Santa Fe	Bogotá	Estadio El Campín
Sporting de Barranquilla	Barranquilla	Estadio Romelio Martínez
Unión Magdalena	Santa Marta	Estadio Eduardo Santos

== Torneo Apertura ==
Pos	Team	Pld	Pts
1	América	14	23
2	Junior	14	19
3	Independiente Medellín	14	18
4	Unión Magdalena	14	18
5	Millonarios	14	17
6	Atlético Nacional	14	16
7	Deportivo Pereira	14	15
8	Once Caldas	14	14
9	Deportivo Cali	14	13
10	Deportes Tolima	14	12
11	Santa Fe	14	12
12	Deportes Quindío	14	12
13	Atlético Bucaramanga	14	10
14	Cúcuta Deportivo	14	7
15	Sporting de Barranquilla	14	4

== Pentagonal ==
The Pentagonal, officially known as the Copa Colombia, was played as a mid-season stage of the league championship, with its results used to award bonus points to the top finishers in the overall standings.

=== First stage ===
Teams were divided into three regional groups. Points were given after teams played each other home-and-away. The top 8 of the overall standings qualified for the second stage.

Group A (Occidental)

- América
- Deportes Quindío
- Deportivo Cali
- Deportivo Pereira
- Once Caldas

Group B (Central)

- Atlético Bucaramanga
- Cúcuta Deportivo
- Deportes Tolima
- Millonarios
- Santa Fe

Group C (Septentrional)

- Atlético Nacional
- Independiente Medellín
- Junior
- Sporting
- Unión Magdalena

=== Overall standings ===
The following top 8 teams qualified to the second stage:

Pos	Team
1	Junior
2	Millonarios
3	Santa Fe
4	Independiente Medellín
5	Unión Magdalena
6	Deportes Quindío
7	América
8	Deportivo Pereira

=== Second stage ===
==== Quarterfinals ====
Team 1	Agg.	Team 2
Junior	–	Deportivo Pereira
Millonarios	–	América
Santa Fe	–	Deportes Quindío
Unión Magdalena	–	Independiente Medellín

==== Semifinals ====
Team 1	1st leg	2nd leg	Team 2
América	1–1	1–3	Santa Fe
Unión Magdalena	1–0	3–0	Junior

==== Final ====
Team 1	1st leg	2nd leg	Team 2
Unión Magdalena	0–0	1–2	Santa Fe

=== Bonus Points ===
The top 4 received bonus points in the league championship:

Pos	Team	Bonus pts
1	Santa Fe	0.500
2	Magdalena	0.375
3	Junior	0.250
4	América	0.125

== Torneo Finalización ==
Pos	Team	Pld	Pts
1	América	14	21
2	Millonarios	14	20
3	Independiente Medellín	14	19
4	Deportes Quindío	14	18
5	Deportivo Cali	14	17
6	Atlético Nacional	14	17
7	Deportivo Pereira	14	14
8	Junior	14	13
9	Santa Fe	14	13
10	Atlético Bucaramanga	14	12
11	Unión Magdalena	14	11
12	Cúcuta Deportivo	14	11
13	Once Caldas	14	9
14	Sporting de Barranquilla	14	8
15	Deportes Tolima	14	7

== Cuadrangular Inicial ==
=== Group A ===
Pos	Team	Pld	Pts
1	Junior	6	8
2	Millonarios	6	8
3	América	6	6
4	Independiente Medellín	6	2

=== Group B ===
Pos	Team	Pld	Pts
1	Unión Magdalena	6	7
2	Atlético Nacional	6	7
3	Santa Fe	6	6
4	Deportes Quindío	6	4

=== Repechaje ===
Pos	Team	Pld	Pts
1	Unión Magdalena	4	5
2	América	4	4
3	Atlético Nacional	4	4
4	Independiente Medellín	4	3

== Top goalscorers ==
Rank	Name	Club	Goals
1	(Uruguay) Héctor Méndez	Deportivo Pereira	17
2	(Colombia) Sergio Angulo	América	16
3	(Colombia) Carlos Valencia	Independiente Medellín	15
3	(Argentina) Héctor Sosa	Santa Fe	15
5	(Argentina) Óscar Júarez	Millonarios	14
6	(Colombia) Alveiro Valencia	Deportes Quindío	13
6	(Colombia) Armando Díaz	Santa Fe	13
8	(Colombia) Teddy Orozco	Unión Magdalena	12
8	(Colombia) Carlos Castro	Independiente Medellín	12
8	(Colombia) Jorge Lara	Independiente Medellín	12

Source: RSSSF.com Colombia 1989

== Bibliography ==
- Ruiz Bonilla, Guillermo (October 2008). La gran historia del Fútbol Profesional Colombiano [The Grand History of Colombian Professional Football] (in Spanish). Ediciones Dayscript. p. 223. ISBN 978-958-98713-0-0.
