= Copa Colombia =

Copa BetPlay Dimayor
- Founded: 14 October 1950; Re-established on 14 February 2008
- Region: Colombia
- Teams: 36
- Qualifier for: Copa Sudamericana (2008–2016, 2020, 2024–present); Copa Libertadores (2017–2019, 2021–2023)
- Current champions: Atlético Nacional (8th title)
- Most championships: Atlético Nacional (8 titles)
- Broadcaster(s): Win Sports, Win+ Fútbol
- Website: dimayor.com.co
- 2026 Copa Colombia

The Copa Colombia (English: Colombia Cup), officially known as Copa BetPlay Dimayor, is an annual football tournament in Colombia. It is contested by the 36 professional clubs affiliated to the División Mayor del Fútbol Profesional Colombiano (DIMAYOR) and is the nation's domestic cup competition, equivalent to the FA Cup in England or the Copa del Rey in Spain.

The Copa Colombia was played for the first time in 1950, and it has been played consecutively since its revival in 2008. Throughout history, the Copa Colombia name has been used to refer to several tournaments or trophies:

- A double-elimination, knockout tournament parallel to the Colombian league, which was played from 1950–51 to 1952–53.
- A tournament that was played under a round-robin group format in which teams advanced to a final group, which was also named as Copa Presidente de la República, played from late 1956 to early 1957.
- A commemorative trophy awarded to Millonarios in 1963, which is not considered a Copa Colombia title.
- A tournament played in 1981 and 1989, which was part of the league season and awarded bonus points or berths to the final stages of the league tournament.
- The knockout tournament played by teams in Categoría Primera A and Categoría Primera B, established since 2008.

Atlético Nacional are the current holders, who won their eighth Copa Colombia title against Independiente Medellín, winning the final series by a 1–0 aggregate score. Atlético Nacional are also the most successful club in the competition.

== History ==
=== Copa Colombia in "El Dorado" ===
The Copa Colombia was an idea promoted in 1950 by DIMAYOR at the time known as "El Dorado" due to the boom experienced by football in the country. It emerged as an official tournament to be held annually, independent from the league championship and under a particular knockout format in which teams were divided by proximity into territorial groups of four teams each. Teams faced each other in home-and-away matches to determine the teams that advanced to a stage known as the winners' round. When a team lost two ties it was eliminated, while if it won it played a new round. The worst of the three remaining teams was eliminated, while a new tie was played, called losers' round, to determine the other team that reached the final. Due to the economic power of clubs and the Colombian league at that time, many teams had large payrolls for both tournaments as well as the international games they played. However, the little interest the competition generated among the participants led to delays in the scheduling of games and the first tournament ended in 1951. It was the reason why the next edition was not held until 1952, and its conclusion was again delayed until the following year.

In the period between both editions (1951–52), what turned out to be the early rounds of the 1952–53 edition is mistakenly referred as another edition of the competition due to its double-elimination format. Boca Juniors de Cali (as winners of the winners' round) and Millonarios (who were defeated by Boca Juniors in the winners' round but then went on to win the losers' round) played the final of the 1952–53 edition, which was ultimately won by Millonarios. Following that edition, the tournament was cancelled due to the lack of interest displayed by fans and teams alike.

An attempt to resume it was made in 1956–57: in said third edition, the first phase was played and six teams qualified to play a final hexagonal: Atlético Nacional, Santa Fe, Deportivo Pereira, Boca Juniors de Cali and the ones that would be the top two of said hexagonal: Independiente Medellín and Atlético Bucaramanga; however, the grand final between these two teams was never played, thus the tournament was abandoned and no more editions were played until the 1980s.

=== Commemorative cup (1963) ===
After consecutively winning the league titles in 1961, 1962 and 1963, Millonarios were granted permanent ownership of the "Copa Colombia" trophy, which should have been awarded to the winner of three editions. As these editions did not come to fruition, Millonarios were awarded the trophy on account of their league success. Although the club counts it as a title, it is not recognized as an official title by DIMAYOR.

In 2017, and through its Twitter account, DIMAYOR included said trophy among those won by manager Gabriel Ochoa Uribe (who coached the club in 1963), without clarifying whether it is an official title.

=== 1980s: Copa Colombia as part of the league tournament ===
In 1981, an event with the same name was held again but with the particularity that it was played by the 10 clubs eliminated from the final quadrangular of the Campeonato Profesional (made up of 14 teams), as an appendix phase of the championship. Firstly, the six teams eliminated in the regular phase participated in a hexagonal from which one team (Independiente Medellín) qualified for the final, with the other finalist (Deportivo Cali) being decided in a quadrangular between the four teams that were eliminated in the semifinal phase. Independiente Medellín won the tournament after beating Deportivo Cali 3–1 in the first leg and a 1–1 draw in the second leg, both played in Medellín. The competition had an incentive for the first time, awarding a spot in the league's final octagonal for the following season, which Independiente Medellín did not need in the end since they ultimately qualified through league performance. In 2014, this tournament was officially recognized by the Colombian Football Federation as part of the tribute that CONMEBOL paid to Independiente Medellín for its 101st anniversary.

In 1989, a new Copa Colombia edition was held, again as part of the league championship. It was played between the first and second rounds of the tournament and the points from this competition were added to the league's aggregate table, through which eight teams would qualify for the final stage of the championship. However, that year's tournament was abandoned due to the assassination of referee Álvaro Ortega. The Copa's first stage was played in three regional groups of five teams each, and the top eight in the tournament's table qualified for a knockout stage. Santa Fe won the competition by beating Unión Magdalena in the final, and was awarded 0.5 bonus points. The runners-up, Unión Magdalena, were awarded 0.375 bonus points, whilst semi-finalists Junior and América de Cali were awarded 0.250 and 0.125 bonus points, respectively.

=== Reinstatement in 2008 ===
On 14 February 2008, the 36 member clubs of DIMAYOR approved the holding of a new tournament known as Copa Colombia, integrating the teams competing in the Primera A and Primera B tiers of Colombian professional football. In its first editions, it granted the winner a berth into the following season's Copa Sudamericana.

Starting from its 2017 edition, it granted its winner a place in the Copa Libertadores for the following season. The only exception to this was the 2020 edition, which awarded its winner a berth into the 2022 Copa Sudamericana given that the tournament was temporarily suspended due to the COVID-19 pandemic and did not end within the calendar year. Qualification for the Copa Libertadores was granted to the winners until the 2023 edition, with the 36 DIMAYOR member clubs deciding that the winners of the 2024 Copa Colombia would qualify for the Copa Sudamericana.

== Editions ==
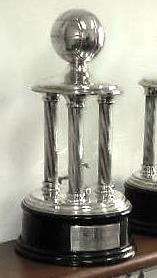
One of the Copa Colombia of the 1950s from the trophy room of Millonarios F.C.

=== Copa Colombia (1950–1989) ===
| Ed. | Season | Winner | Runner-up |
|---|---|---|---|
| 1 | 1950–51 | Boca Juniors de Cali (1) | Santa Fe |
| 2 | 1952–53 | Millonarios (1) | Boca Juniors de Cali |
| 3 | 1956–57 | Abandoned | |
| 4 | 1981 | Independiente Medellín (1) | Deportivo Cali |
| 5 | 1989 | Santa Fe (1) | Unión Magdalena |

Source: RSSSF (Note: some editions cited in RSSSF as official are not considered official by all sources)

=== Copa Colombia (2008 – present) ===
| Ed. | Season | Winner | Runner-up |
Copa Colombia (Copa Postobón)
| 6 | 2008 | La Equidad (1) | Once Caldas |
| 7 | 2009 | Santa Fe (2) | Deportivo Pasto |
| 8 | 2010 | Deportivo Cali (1) | Itagüí |
| 9 | 2011 | Millonarios (2) | Boyacá Chicó |
| 10 | 2012 | Atlético Nacional (1) | Deportivo Pasto |
| 11 | 2013 | Atlético Nacional (2) | Millonarios |
| 12 | 2014 | Deportes Tolima (1) | Santa Fe |
Copa Colombia (Copa Águila)
| 13 | 2015 | Junior (1) | Santa Fe |
| 14 | 2016 | Atlético Nacional (3) | Junior |
| 15 | 2017 | Junior (2) | Independiente Medellín |
| 16 | 2018 | Atlético Nacional (4) | Once Caldas |
| 17 | 2019 | Independiente Medellín (2) | Deportivo Cali |
Copa Colombia (Copa BetPlay Dimayor)
| 18 | 2020 | Independiente Medellín (3) | Deportes Tolima |
| 19 | 2021 | Atlético Nacional (5) | Deportivo Pereira |
| 20 | 2022 | Millonarios (3) | Junior |
| 21 | 2023 | Atlético Nacional (6) | Millonarios |
| 22 | 2024 | Atlético Nacional (7) | América de Cali |
| 23 | 2025 | Atlético Nacional (8) | Independiente Medellín |
| 24 | 2026 | | |

Source: RSSSF

== Titles by club ==
| Club | Titles | Runners-up | Seasons won | Seasons runner-up |
|---|---|---|---|---|
| Atlético Nacional | 8 | — | 2012, 2013, 2016, 2018, 2021, 2023, 2024, 2025 | — |
| Independiente Medellín | 3 | 2 | 1981, 2019, 2020 | 2017, 2025 |
| Millonarios | 3 | 2 | 1952–53, 2011, 2022 | 2013, 2023 |
| Santa Fe | 2 | 3 | 1989, 2009 | 1950–51, 2014, 2015 |
| Junior | 2 | 2 | 2015, 2017 | 2016, 2022 |
| Deportivo Cali | 1 | 2 | 2010 | 1981, 2019 |
| Boca Juniors de Cali | 1 | 1 | 1950–51 | 1952–53 |
| Deportes Tolima | 1 | 1 | 2014 | 2020 |
| La Equidad | 1 | — | 2008 | — |
| Deportivo Pasto | — | 2 | — | 2009, 2012 |
| Once Caldas | — | 2 | — | 2008, 2018 |
| América de Cali | — | 1 | — | 2024 |
| Boyacá Chicó | — | 1 | — | 2011 |
| Deportivo Pereira | — | 1 | — | 2021 |
| Itagüí | — | 1 | — | 2010 |
| Unión Magdalena | — | 1 | — | 1989 |
