= 2016 Categoría Primera A season =

Liga Águila
- Season: 2016
- Champions: Apertura: Independiente Medellín (6th title); Finalización: Santa Fe (9th title)
- Relegated: Boyacá Chicó; Fortaleza
- Copa Libertadores: Atlético Nacional (Copa Libertadores winner); Independiente Medellín; Santa Fe; Millonarios; Junior
- Copa Sudamericana: Deportes Tolima (cup best team not yet qualified); Deportivo Cali; Patriotas; Rionegro Águilas
- Matches: 428
- Goals: 1,031 (2.41 per match)
- Top goalscorer: Apertura: Miguel Borja (19 goals); Finalización: Ayron del Valle (12 goals)
- Biggest home win: Atlético Nacional 7–0 Atlético Bucaramanga (3 April 2016)
- Biggest away win: Boyacá Chicó 0–4 Deportes Tolima (30 July 2016); Rionegro Águilas 0–4 Santa Fe (17 October 2016)
- Highest scoring: Alianza Petrolera 3–6 Atlético Bucaramanga (21 March 2016)

The 2016 Categoría Primera A season (officially known as the 2016 Liga Águila season for sponsorship reasons) was the 69th season of Colombia's top-flight football league. Atlético Nacional came in as the defending champions having won the title in the 2015 season's Finalización tournament.

20 teams competed against one another, eighteen returning from last season plus Atlético Bucaramanga and Fortaleza, who were promoted from the 2015 Primera B and will be returning to the top tier after 7 years and 1 year, respectively, replacing Uniautónoma and Cúcuta Deportivo who were relegated at the end of the last season.

Independiente Medellín won its sixth title in the Torneo Apertura after beating Junior in the finals, while in the Torneo Finalización Santa Fe won its ninth title after beating Deportes Tolima in the finals.

== Format ==
The league retained the format used in the most recent season. The Apertura and Finalización tournaments were divided into three stages: a First Stage which was contested on a single round-robin basis, with each team playing the other teams once and playing a regional rival once more for a total of 20 matches. The top eight teams after the twenty rounds advanced to a knockout round, where they were pitted into four ties to be played on a home-and-away basis, with the four winners advancing to the semifinals and the winner of each semifinal advancing to the final of the tournament, which was played on a home-and-away basis as well. The winner of the final in each tournament was declared the tournament champion and will participate in the 2017 Copa Libertadores.

== Teams ==
=== Stadia and locations ===
Locations of the 2016 Categoría Primera A teams

Team	City	Stadium	2015 season
Alianza Petrolera	Barrancabermeja	Daniel Villa Zapata	14th
Atlético Bucaramanga	Bucaramanga	Alfonso López^{a}	1st (Primera B)
Atlético Huila	Neiva	Guillermo Plazas Alcid^{b}	11th
Atlético Nacional	Medellín	Atanasio Girardot	1st
Boyacá Chicó	Tunja	La Independencia	18th
Cortuluá	Tuluá	Doce de Octubre	15th
Deportes Tolima	Ibagué	Manuel Murillo Toro	5th
Deportivo Cali	Cali	Deportivo Cali^{c}	4th
Deportivo Pasto	Pasto	Departamental Libertad	16th
Envigado	Envigado	Polideportivo Sur	8th
Fortaleza	Bogotá	Metropolitano de Techo	3rd (Primera B)
Independiente Medellín	Medellín	Atanasio Girardot	2nd
Jaguares	Montería	Jaraguay	19th
Junior	Barranquilla	Metropolitano	3rd
La Equidad	Bogotá	Metropolitano de Techo	13th
Millonarios	Bogotá	Nemesio Camacho^{d}	6th
Once Caldas	Manizales	Palogrande	9th
Patriotas	Tunja	La Independencia	10th
Rionegro Águilas^{e}	Rionegro	Alberto Grisales	12th
Santa Fe	Bogotá	Nemesio Camacho^{d}	7th

a: Temporarily plays its home games at Estadio Álvaro Gómez Hurtado in Floridablanca due to remodeling works at Estadio Alfonso López.
b: Temporarily played its home games at Estadio Manuel Murillo Toro in Ibagué due to the temporary closure of Estadio Guillermo Plazas Alcid.
c: Plays Sunday evening home games at Estadio Pascual Guerrero in Cali.
d: Temporarily played its home games at Estadio Metropolitano de Techo due to remodeling works at Estadio El Campín.
e: Formerly known as Águilas Doradas.

== Torneo Apertura ==
=== First stage ===
The First Stage began on 29 January and consisted of twenty rounds including a series of regional rivalries in the tenth round. It ended on 29 May with the top eight teams at the end of this stage advancing to the knockout stage.

==== Standings ====
Pos	Team	Pld	W	D	L	GF	GA	GD	Pts	Qualification
1	Independiente Medellín	20	11	7	2	33	17	+16	40	Advanced to the knockout phase
2	Atlético Nacional	20	12	3	5	42	20	+22	39	Advanced to the knockout phase
3	Millonarios	20	11	4	5	30	17	+13	37	Advanced to the knockout phase
4	Santa Fe	20	11	4	5	28	18	+10	37	Advanced to the knockout phase
5	Junior	20	10	7	3	28	20	+8	37	Advanced to the knockout phase
6	Rionegro Águilas	20	10	4	6	30	23	+7	34	Advanced to the knockout phase
7	Deportivo Cali	20	9	5	6	35	28	+7	32	Advanced to the knockout phase
8	Cortuluá	20	8	7	5	29	23	+6	31	Advanced to the knockout phase
9	Patriotas	20	8	5	7	22	23	−1	29	
10	Once Caldas	20	7	5	8	26	22	+4	26	
11	Deportivo Pasto	20	5	9	6	19	23	−4	24	
12	Deportes Tolima	20	7	3	10	25	32	−7	24	
13	Atlético Bucaramanga	20	3	14	3	21	27	−6	23	
14	Jaguares	20	6	5	9	16	29	−13	23	
15	Envigado	20	4	7	9	21	22	−1	19	
16	Atlético Huila	20	5	4	11	18	26	−8	19	
17	La Equidad	20	4	7	9	20	30	−10	19	
18	Boyacá Chicó	20	3	8	9	17	28	−11	17	
19	Alianza Petrolera	20	4	5	11	24	38	−14	17	
20	Fortaleza	20	4	3	13	16	34	−18	15	

Source: DIMAYOR
Rules for classification: 1) Points, 2) Goal difference, 3) Goals for, 4) Away goals for, 5) Away goals against, 6) Drawing of lots

==== Results ====
Home \ Away	APE	BUC	HUI	NAC	BOY	COR	TOL	CAL	PAS	ENV	FOR	DIM	JAG	JUN	EQU	MIL	ONC	PAT	RIO	SFE
Alianza Petrolera		3–6	0–0			1–1			2–2		2–1			1–2		0–2	1–3	0–1	2–1	
Atlético Bucaramanga	1–1							1–1		0–1	0–0	2–2			2–1	1–1	0–3		0–0	0–0
Atlético Huila		0–0		0–1	3–1		0–2		4–0	1–0		0–3	0–1		3–1			0–0		
Atlético Nacional	3–1	7–0			2–0			2–1		3–2	4–1	1–2			3–0				1–0	0–1
Boyacá Chicó	1–1	1–1						1–0		1–1	1–0	1–1			3–4			1–0	0–2	0–1
Cortuluá		0–0	0–3	2–0	2–2		3–1	4–1	1–1	1–1			2–0					2–1		
Deportes Tolima	2–1	1–2	1–0	2–0	2–1					2–1		1–2			1–0				0–3	2–2
Deportivo Cali	3–2		5–1			3–2	5–1				1–0		3–2			1–1	1–0		3–1	3–4
Deportivo Pasto		0–0		0–2	2–0		1–1	0–1		2–2		1–0	0–1		2–1		1–0			
Envigado	0–1							0–0			4–0	0–1		1–1	0–0	2–0	0–1		2–3	2–1
Fortaleza			1–1			0–1	2–1		0–1				1–2	1–2	0–1	2–0	1–1	3–2		
Independiente Medellín	4–2			1–1		2–0		1–1			3–0			0–1		1–0	2–1		2–0	2–1
Jaguares	2–1	1–1		0–3	1–1		0–0			1–0		2–2		0–2	1–1					2–1
Junior		1–1	1–0	3–3	1–1	2–1	2–1	2–0	2–2				1–0					1–0		
La Equidad	3–1					0–0		1–1			0–1	2–2		0–0		0–3	3–2		2–3	0–2
Millonarios			2–1	2–1	3–1	1–2	2–1		1–1				2–0	3–1				3–0		2–0
Once Caldas			3–0	0–3	0–0	1–3	3–2		0–0				4–0	0–0		0–1		3–1		
Patriotas		3–3		2–2	1–0		2–1	2–1	2–1	2–1		0–0	2–0		0–0					
Rionegro Águilas			3–1			2–1			1–1	1–1	3–2		2–0	2–1		2–1	1–1	0–1		
Santa Fe	0–1		1–0			1–1			2–1		4–0			3–2		0–0	2–0	1–0	1–0	

Updated to match(es) played on 29 May 2016. Source: DIMAYOR
Legend: Blue = home team win; Yellow = draw; Red = away team win.

=== Knockout phase bracket ===
Quarterfinals
1	Ind. Medellín	1	2	3
7	Deportivo Cali	2	0	2
4	Santa Fe	1	1	2
8	Cortuluá	2	1	3
2	Atlético Nacional (p)	1	1	2 (5)
6	Rionegro Águilas	1	1	2 (4)
3	Millonarios	0	4	4 (2)
5	Junior (p)	2	2	4 (4)

Semifinals
1	Ind. Medellín (p)	2	1	3 (8)
8	Cortuluá	1	2	3 (7)
2	Atlético Nacional	1	0	1 (2)
5	Junior (p)	1	0	1 (4)

Finals
1	Ind. Medellín	1	2	3
5	Junior	1	0	1

=== Quarterfinals ===
Team 1	Agg.	Team 2	1st leg	2nd leg
Deportivo Cali	2–3	Independiente Medellín	2–1	0–2
Rionegro Águilas	2–2 (4–5 p)	Atlético Nacional	1–1	1–1
Junior	4–4 (4–2 p)	Millonarios	2–0	2–4
Cortuluá	3–2	Santa Fe	2–1	1–1

=== Semifinals ===
Team 1	Agg.	Team 2	1st leg	2nd leg
Cortuluá	3–3 (7–8 p)	Independiente Medellín	1–2	2–1
Junior	1–1 (4–2 p)	Atlético Nacional	1–1	0–0

=== Finals ===
15 June 2016
19:00 UTC−5

Junior	1 – 1	Independiente Medellín
Aguirre 20'	Report	Cabezas 26'

Estadio Metropolitano Roberto Meléndez, Barranquilla
Referee: Nicolás Gallo

19 June 2016
18:00 UTC−5

Independiente Medellín	2 – 0	Junior
Marrugo 35', 90+3'	Report

Estadio Atanasio Girardot, Medellín
Referee: Harold Perilla

=== Top goalscorers ===
Rank	Name	Club	Goals
1	(Colombia) Miguel Borja	Cortuluá	19
2	(Colombia) Vladimir Hernández	Junior	13
3	(Colombia) Luis Páez	Rionegro Águilas	12
3	(Colombia) Sergio Romero	Alianza Petrolera	12
5	(Colombia) Leonardo Castro	Independiente Medellín	10

Source: DIMAYOR

== Torneo Finalización ==
=== First stage ===
The First Stage began on 1 July and featured the same format used in the Torneo Apertura, with reversed fixtures. It ended on 20 November with the top eight teams at the end of this stage advancing to the knockout stage.

==== Standings ====
Pos	Team	Pld	W	D	L	GF	GA	GD	Pts	Qualification
1	Atlético Nacional	20	9	10	1	32	19	+13	37	Advanced to the knockout phase
2	Deportivo Cali	20	10	4	6	25	17	+8	34	Advanced to the knockout phase
3	Deportes Tolima	20	8	9	3	25	16	+9	33	Advanced to the knockout phase
4	Santa Fe	20	9	6	5	22	15	+7	33	Advanced to the knockout phase
5	Independiente Medellín	20	9	6	5	31	26	+5	33	Advanced to the knockout phase
6	Millonarios	20	10	3	7	28	23	+5	33	Advanced to the knockout phase
7	Atlético Bucaramanga	20	9	5	6	26	19	+7	32	Advanced to the knockout phase
8	Patriotas	20	9	5	6	23	19	+4	32	Advanced to the knockout phase
9	Envigado	20	9	5	6	23	20	+3	32	
10	Alianza Petrolera	20	8	6	6	22	17	+5	30	
11	Junior	20	7	7	6	25	27	−2	28	
12	Rionegro Águilas	20	7	5	8	23	28	−5	26	
13	Once Caldas	20	7	4	9	25	24	+1	25	
14	La Equidad	20	5	8	7	24	27	−3	23	
15	Jaguares	20	6	5	9	16	20	−4	23	
16	Atlético Huila	20	6	5	9	18	27	−9	23	
17	Fortaleza	20	5	5	10	20	28	−8	20	
18	Deportivo Pasto	20	5	5	10	19	28	−9	20	
19	Cortuluá	20	3	5	12	22	34	−12	14	
20	Boyacá Chicó	20	4	2	14	18	33	−15	14	

Source: DIMAYOR
Rules for classification: 1) Points, 2) Goal difference, 3) Goals for, 4) Away goals for, 5) Away goals against, 6) Drawing of lots

==== Results ====
Home \ Away	APE	BUC	HUI	NAC	BOY	COR	TOL	CAL	PAS	ENV	FOR	DIM	JAG	JUN	EQU	MIL	ONC	PAT	RIO	SFE
Alianza Petrolera		0–1		3–3	1–0		3–0	1–0		1–0		3–1	2–0		0–0					0–1
Atlético Bucaramanga	2–2		0–0	2–2	2–0	3–1	0–1		2–1				1–0	3–0				0–0		
Atlético Huila	2–2					2–1	1–2	2–1			2–1			3–1		0–3	2–1		1–2	1–0
Atlético Nacional			4–0			1–1	2–2		3–1			1–0	2–1	2–2		1–0	1–0	2–1		
Boyacá Chicó			2–0	1–1		3–1	0–4		0–2				0–1	2–2		0–1	2–1	1–2		
Cortuluá	1–0							1–1			2–2	3–4		1–2	2–0	2–3	1–1		0–1	0–1
Deportes Tolima			1–1			0–2		1–0	0–0		0–0		2–0	1–1		3–1	3–0	1–0		
Deportivo Cali		2–1		1–0	2–0	3–1			1–1	1–0		1–2		2–0	1–1			1–0		
Deportivo Pasto	0–1		2–0			1–0					1–0			1–1		1–1	1–2	2–3	0–1	0–1
Envigado		0–0	1–0	0–0	3–1	1–0	1–0		1–1				2–1					0–0	3–1	
Fortaleza	1–0	1–2		0–1	2–1			0–2		1–2		2–1			1–1				2–1	1–1
Independiente Medellín		1–0	2–1	2–2	3–2		1–1		2–0	0–1			1–1		1–0			3–0		
Jaguares			0–0			1–1		0–1	3–1		1–0			0–0		2–1	1–1	2–3	1–0	
Junior	2–0									2–1	1–2	1–1	1–0		2–1	2–1	0–1		1–1	2–1
La Equidad		2–1	1–0	1–3	1–2		2–2		4–0	2–2	2–2		0–1					1–1		
Millonarios	1–0	0–3 (Note: DIMAYOR awarded a 3–0 away win in favor of Atlético Bucaramanga for pitch invasion by fans of Millonarios. Original result was a 0–1 win for Atlético Bucaramanga.)						1–0		4–1	3–2	3–1			1–2		1–1		0–0	1–0
Once Caldas	1–1	3–0						2–0	2–3	2–0	3–0	1–2			0–2				1–2	1–2
Patriotas	1–1		0–0		1–0	4–1					1–0			3–2		1–0	0–1		0–1	2–0
Rionegro Águilas	0–1	2–3		1–1	2–1		0–0	1–3		1–4		2–2			4–0					0–4
Santa Fe		1–0		0–0	1–0		1–1	2–2		2–0		1–1	1–0		1–1	1–2				

Updated to match(es) played on 20 November 2016. Source: DIMAYOR
Legend: Blue = home team win; Yellow = draw; Red = away team win.

=== Knockout phase bracket ===
Quarterfinals
1	Atlético Nacional	1	3	4
6	Millonarios	2	0	2
4	Santa Fe	2	2	4
5	Independiente Medellín	1	0	1
3	Deportes Tolima (p)	2	0	2 (3)
8	Patriotas	1	1	2 (0)
2	Deportivo Cali	1	1	2
7	Atlético Bucaramanga	2	1	3

Semifinals
1	Atlético Nacional	1	0	1
4	Santa Fe	1	4	5
3	Deportes Tolima (p)	0	2	2 (4)
7	Atlético Bucaramanga	1	1	2 (2)

Finals
4	Santa Fe	0	1	1
3	Deportes Tolima	0	0	0

=== Quarterfinals ===
Team 1	Agg.	Team 2	1st leg	2nd leg
Millonarios	2–4	Atlético Nacional	2–1	0–3
Atlético Bucaramanga	3–2	Deportivo Cali	2–1	1–1
Patriotas	2–2 (0–3 p)	Deportes Tolima	1–2	1–0
Independiente Medellín	1–4	Santa Fe	1–2	0–2

=== Semifinals ===
Team 1	Agg.	Team 2	1st leg	2nd leg
Santa Fe	5–1	Atlético Nacional	1–1	4–0
Atlético Bucaramanga	2–2 (2–4 p)	Deportes Tolima	1–0	1–2

=== Finals ===
14 December 2016
19:00 UTC−5

Deportes Tolima	0–0	Santa Fe
	Report

Estadio Manuel Murillo Toro, Ibagué
Referee: Nicolás Gallo

18 December 2016
18:00 UTC−5

Santa Fe	1–0	Deportes Tolima
Urrego 11'	Report

Estadio El Campín, Bogotá
Referee: Wilmar Roldán

=== Top goalscorers ===
Rank	Name	Club	Goals
1	(Colombia) Ayron del Valle	Millonarios	12
2	(Colombia) Diego Álvarez	Patriotas	11
3	(Colombia) Darío Rodríguez	Atlético Bucaramanga	10
4	(Colombia) Luis Páez	Rionegro Águilas	9
4	(Colombia) Ángelo Rodríguez	Deportes Tolima	9

Source: DIMAYOR

== Relegation ==
A separate table is kept to determine the teams that get relegated to the Categoría Primera B for the next season. The table includes an average of all first stage games played for the current season and the previous two seasons. For purposes of elaborating the table, the promoted teams are given the same point and goal tallies as the team in the 18th position at the start of the season.

Pos	Team	2014 Pts	2015 Pts	2016 Pts	Total Pts	Total Pld	Avg	Relegation
1	Atlético Nacional	63	79	76	218	116	1.879	
2	Independiente Medellín	51	70	73	194	116	1.672	
3	Santa Fe	61	62	70	193	116	1.664	
4	Junior	55	69	65	189	116	1.629	
5	Millonarios	53	62	70	185	116	1.595	
6	Deportivo Cali	47	67	66	180	116	1.552	
7	Rionegro Águilas	57	54	60	171	116	1.474	
8	Deportes Tolima	45	68	57	170	116	1.466	
9	Once Caldas	57	57	51	165	116	1.422	
10	Patriotas	45	58	61	164	116	1.414	
11	Envigado	48	61	51	160	116	1.379	
12	Alianza Petrolera	54	53	47	154	116	1.328	
13	Atlético Huila	46	57	42	145	116	1.25	
14	La Equidad	41	54	42	137	116	1.181	
15	Atlético Bucaramanga	45	31	55	131	116	1.129	
16	Cortuluá	35	45	45	125	116	1.078	
17	Jaguares	45	31	46	122	116	1.052	
18	Deportivo Pasto	38	39	44	121	116	1.043	
19	Boyacá Chicó (R)	47	34	31	112	116	0.966	Relegation to Categoría Primera B
20	Fortaleza (R)	45	31	35	111	116	0.957	Relegation to Categoría Primera B

Source: DIMAYOR
Rules for classification: 1st average; 2nd goal difference; 3rd number of goals scored; 4th away goals scored.

== Aggregate table ==
Pos	Team	Pld	W	D	L	GF	GA	GD	Pts	Qualification or relegation
1	Santa Fe (C)	48	24	13	11	62	38	+24	85	2017 Copa Libertadores Group stage (Note: Independiente Medellín are qualified for the 2017 Copa Libertadores as Apertura champions, and Santa Fe are qualified for the 2017 Copa Libertadores as Finalización champions. Atlético Nacional are qualified for the 2017 Copa Libertadores as Copa Libertadores winners.)
2	Atlético Nacional	48	22	18	8	82	49	+33	84	2017 Copa Libertadores Group stage
3	Independiente Medellín (C)	48	23	14	11	74	53	+21	83	2017 Copa Libertadores Group stage
4	Millonarios	44	23	7	14	64	48	+16	76	2017 Copa Libertadores Second Stage
5	Junior	46	18	17	11	59	55	+4	71	2017 Copa Libertadores Second Stage
6	Deportivo Cali	44	20	10	14	64	51	+13	70	2017 Copa Sudamericana First Stage (Note: Deportes Tolima are qualified for the 2017 Copa Sudamericana as the Copa Colombia best team not qualified for Copa Libertadores.)
7	Patriotas	42	18	10	14	47	44	+3	64	2017 Copa Sudamericana First Stage
8	Deportes Tolima	46	17	13	16	54	53	+1	64	2017 Copa Sudamericana First Stage
9	Rionegro Águilas	42	17	11	14	55	53	+2	62	2017 Copa Sudamericana First Stage
10	Atlético Bucaramanga	44	14	20	10	52	50	+2	62	
11	Cortuluá	44	13	13	18	57	62	−5	52	
12	Once Caldas	40	14	9	17	51	46	+5	51	
13	Envigado	40	13	12	15	44	42	+2	51	
14	Alianza Petrolera	40	12	11	17	46	55	−9	47	
15	Jaguares	40	12	10	18	32	49	−17	46	
16	Deportivo Pasto	40	10	14	16	38	51	−13	44	
17	La Equidad	40	9	15	16	44	57	−13	42	
18	Atlético Huila	40	11	9	20	36	53	−17	42	
19	Fortaleza	40	9	8	23	36	62	−26	35	
20	Boyacá Chicó	40	7	10	23	35	61	−26	31	

Source: DIMAYOR
Rules for classification: 1) Points, 2) Goal difference, 3) Goals for, 4) Away goals for, 5) Away goals against, 6) Drawing of lots
(C) Champions
