= 2010 Copa Colombia =

Copa Postobón 2010

Tournament details
- Country: Colombia
- Teams: 36

Final positions
- Champions: Deportivo Cali (1st title)
- Runners-up: Itagüí Ditaires

Tournament statistics
- Top goal scorer: Yovanny Arrechea (11 goals)

The 2010 Copa Colombia, officially the 2010 Copa Postobón for sponsorship reasons, was the eighth edition of the Copa Colombia, the national cup competition for clubs of DIMAYOR. It began on February 24 and ended on November 3.

The winner, Deportivo Cali, earned a berth in the 2011 Copa Sudamericana.

== Format ==
The format for 2010 differs from last year's. A total of 16 teams (instead of 12), which include the group winners, runners-up, and the four best third-placed teams, advance from the first phase to the second phase.

== Phase I ==
Teams advanced to Phase II

=== Group A ===
Group A comprises teams from the Caribbean Region.

Team	Pld	W	D	L	GF	GA	GD	Pts
Real Cartagena	10	5	3	2	20	15	+5	18
Junior	10	5	3	2	13	9	+4	18
Atlético La Sabana	10	3	6	1	15	13	+2	15
Valledupar	10	3	4	3	9	10	−1	13
Barranquilla	10	2	3	5	12	17	−5	9
Unión Magdalena	10	1	3	6	10	15	−5	6

	LSA	BAR	JUN	RCA	UMA	VAL
Atlético La Sabana	–	2–2	1–1	1–2	1–0	1–1
Barranquilla	1–2	–	0–1	1–2	3–2	1–1
Junior	0–0	1–0	–	1–2	2–1	3–2
Real Cartagena	3–3	5–2	1–3	–	1–1	2–0
Unión Magdalena	1–2	1–2	1–1	2–2	–	1–0
Valledupar	2–2	0–0	1–0	1–0	1–0	–

=== Group B ===
Group B comprises teams from the Paisa Region.

Team	Pld	W	D	L	GF	GA	GD	Pts
Atlético Nacional	10	6	1	3	17	8	+9	19
Itagüí Ditaires	10	6	1	3	13	7	+6	19
Envigado	10	4	3	3	11	9	+2	15
Once Caldas	10	4	2	4	17	14	+3	14
Independiente Medellín	10	2	3	5	7	12	−5	9
Deportivo Rionegro	10	2	2	6	7	22	−15	8

	NAC	RIO	ENV	MED	ITA	OCA
Atlético Nacional	–	2–0	3–1	0–0	0–1	5–0
D. Rionegro	2–1	–	0–2	0–2	2–1	0–5
Envigado	1–2	1–1	–	1–0	3–1	1–1
Indepen. Medellín	2–1	1–1	1–0	–	1–1	1–2
Itagüí Ditaires	0–1	1–1	0–1	3–0	–	2–1
Once Caldas	1–2	6–1	0–0	1–0	0–2	–

=== Group C ===
Group C comprises teams from Santander, Norte de Santander, and Boyacá.

Team	Pld	W	D	L	GF	GA	GD	Pts
Cúcuta Deportivo	10	6	1	3	17	11	+6	19
Atlético Bucaramanga	10	5	1	4	17	14	+3	16
Boyacá Chicó	10	5	1	4	14	12	+2	16
Real Santander	10	5	0	5	17	17	0	15
Patriotas	10	4	0	6	12	21	−9	12
Alianza Petrolera	10	2	3	5	15	17	−2	9

	ALP	BUC	BOY	CUC	PAT	RSA
Alianza Petrolera	–	1–1	1–1	0–1	5–1	5–2
Atl. Bucaramanga	3–1	–	2–0	2–1	1–2	0–1
Boyacá Chicó	1–0	4–0	–	3–0	1–3	1–2
Cúcuta Deportivo	2–2	2–1	3–0	–	3–0	3–0
Patriotas	2–0	2–3	0–1	2–0	–	0–3
Real Santander	3–0	0–4	1–2	1–2	4–0	–

=== Group D ===
Group D comprises teams from Bogotá and Villavicencio.

Team	Pld	W	D	L	GF	GA	GD	Pts
La Equidad	10	6	2	2	15	9	+6	20
Millonarios	10	4	4	2	22	14	+8	16
Santa Fe	10	4	4	2	14	9	+5	16
Centauros	10	2	5	3	10	14	−4	11
Academia	10	1	5	4	9	15	−6	8
Bogotá	10	2	2	6	8	17	−9	8

	ACA	BOG	CEN	EQU	MIL	SAF
Academia	–	2–0	0–0	1–1	0–3	1–1
Bogotá	0–0	–	1–2	0–3	3–2	1–0
Centauros	2–1	2–2	–	1–3	2–2	0–0
La Equidad	2–2	1–0	1–0	–	0–3	2–0
Millonarios	4–2	3–0	1–1	0–2	–	2–2
Santa Fe	2–0	2–1	3–0	2–0	2–2	–

=== Group E ===
Group E comprises teams from the Pacific Region.

Team	Pld	W	D	L	GF	GA	GD	Pts
Deportivo Cali	10	5	4	1	18	7	+11	19
Deportivo Pasto	10	3	6	1	12	8	+4	15
Cortuluá	10	4	2	4	15	18	−3	14
América	10	2	6	2	17	14	+3	12
Depor	10	3	2	5	13	17	−4	11
Pacífico	10	2	2	6	12	23	−11	8

	AME	COR	DEP	CAL	PAS	PAC
América	–	4–0	1–1	2–2	0–0	5–1
Cortuluá	3–0	–	1–2	1–0	2–2	2–1
Depor	3–1	2–3	–	0–1	1–0	2–2
Deportivo Cali	1–1	4–1	3–1	–	1–1	5–0
Deportivo Pasto	1–1	1–1	2–1	0–0	–	2–1
Pacífico	2–2	2–1	3–0	0–1	0–3	–

=== Group F ===
Group F comprises teams from Cundinamarca and the western part of the country.

Team	Pld	W	D	L	GF	GA	GD	Pts
Deportes Tolima	10	5	4	1	14	8	+6	19
Deportivo Pereira	10	5	3	2	18	10	+8	18
Atlético Huila	10	5	2	3	16	10	+6	17
Deportes Quindío	10	5	0	5	19	13	+6	15
Expreso Rojo	10	1	5	4	10	21	−11	8
Juventud Soacha	10	1	2	7	10	25	−15	5

	HUI	QUI	TOL	PER	EXR	JUS
Atlético Huila	–	3–1	2–0	0–0	4–0	2–1
Deportes Quindío	3–1	–	0–1	3–1	3–0	3–0
Deportes Tolima	2–1	3–1	–	2–1	1–1	4–1
Deportivo Pereira	1–0	2–1	0–0	–	4–1	2–0
Expreso Rojo	1–1	1–0	1–1	2–2	–	3–3
Juventud Soacha	1–2	1–4	0–0	1–5	2–0	–

== Phase II ==
In all tables, Team #2 played the second leg at home.

=== Round of 16 ===
First legs: August 18 and 19; Second legs: August 25.

Team #1	Points earned	Team #2	1st leg	2nd leg
Deportivo Pasto	0–6	Deportivo Pereira	1–2	0–3
Boyacá Chicó	1–4	Atlético Nacional	2–2	1–2
Atlético La Sabana	3–3 (gd)	Cúcuta Deportivo	1–0	0–4
Atlético Huila	3–3 (gd)	La Equidad	2–1	0–2
Junior	3–3 (2–4 pk)	Deportivo Cali	1–0	2–3
Itagüí Ditaires	4–1	Deportes Tolima	1–0	2–2
Atlético Bucaramanga	3–3 (1–2 pk)	Millonarios	1–2	2–1
Santa Fe	3–3 (3–2 pk)	Real Cartagena	2–0	1–3

=== Quarterfinals ===
First legs: September 8, 15 and 16; Second legs: September 22, 23 and 29.

Team #1	Points earned	Team #2	1st leg	2nd leg
Santa Fe	0–6	Deportivo Cali	0–1	1–3
La Equidad	6–0	Deportivo Pereira	2–0	2–1
Itagüí Ditaires	3–3 (5–4 pk)	Atlético Nacional	4–0	1–5
Millonarios	4–1	Cúcuta Deportivo	1–1	1–0

=== Semifinals ===
First legs: October 6; Second legs: October 13.

Team #1	Points earned	Team #2	1st leg	2nd leg
Deportivo Cali	6–0	La Equidad	2–0	5–3
Millonarios	3–3 (4–5 pk)	Itagüí Ditaires	2–3	3–2

=== Final ===
October 27, 2010
15:30 UTC−05:00

Itagüí Ditaires	0–1	Deportivo Cali
	Report	Escobar 59'

Estadio Metropolitano Ciudad de Itagüí, Itagüí
Referee: Imer Machado

November 3, 2010
18:30 UTC−05:00

Deportivo Cali	2–0	Itagüí Ditaires
Amaya 12'; Escobar 55'	Report

Estadio Deportivo Cali, Palmira
Referee: Albert Duarte

Deportivo Cali won on points 6–0

Copa Colombia
2010 Champion
Deportivo Cali
1st title

== Top goalscorers ==
Rank	Name	Club	Goals
1	(Colombia) Yovanny Arrechea	Millonarios	11
2	(Colombia) Luis Alfonso Páez	Itagüí Ditaires	10
3	(Colombia) José Herrera	Atlético Bucaramanga	8
3	(Colombia) Edinson Palomino	Real Cartagena	8
5	(Colombia) César Amaya	Deportivo Cali	7
5	(Colombia) Óscar Móvil	Alianza Petrolera	7

== See also ==
- Copa Colombia
- DIMAYOR
