= 2009 Categoría Primera B season =

Copa Premier
- Season: 2009
- Champions: Cortuluá (2nd title)
- Promoted: Cortuluá

The 2009 Categoría Primera B season, officially known as the 2009 Copa Premier season for sponsorship reasons) was the 20th season since its founding as Colombia's second division football league.

== Teams ==
- Starting from this season, Córdoba moved from Cereté to Sincelejo and was rebranded as Atlético de la Sabana, while Girardot moved to Palmira and became Deportes Palmira.
- Dépor moved from Jamundí to Cali, and Expreso Rojo moved from Fusagasugá to Zipaquirá.
Locations of the 2018 Categoría Primera B teams

Team	City	Stadium	Capacity
Academia	Bogotá	Estadio Compensar	4,500
Alianza Petrolera	Barrancabermeja	Estadio Daniel Villa Zapata	8,000
Atlético Bucaramanga	Bucaramanga	Estadio Alfonso López	28,000
Atlético de la Sabana	Sincelejo	Estadio Arturo Cumplido Sierra	5,000
Barranquilla	Barranquilla	Estadio Romelio Martínez	20,000
Bogotá	Bogotá	Estadio Alfonso López Pumarejo	15,000
Centauros	Villavicencio	Estadio Manuel Calle Lombana	15,000
Cortuluá	Tuluá	Estadio Doce de Octubre	16,000
Dépor	Cali	Estadio Pascual Guerrero	45,195
Deportes Palmira	Palmira	Estadio Francisco Rivera Escobar	9,000
Deportivo Rionegro	Rionegro	Estadio Alberto Grisales	9,000
Expreso Rojo	Zipaquirá	Estadio Municipal Los Zipas	2,000
Itagüí Ditaires	Itagüí	Estadio Metropolitano Ciudad de Itagüí	12,000
Juventud Soacha	Soacha	Estadio Luis Carlos Galán Sarmiento	8,000
Patriotas	Tunja	Estadio de La Independencia	20,000
Real Santander	Floridablanca	Estadio Álvaro Gómez Hurtado	4,000
Unión Magdalena	Santa Marta	Estadio Eduardo Santos	23,000
Valledupar	Valledupar	Estadio Armando Maestre Pavajeau	10,000

== Torneo Apertura ==
=== First stage ===
==== Group A ====
Pos	Team	Pld	W	D	L	GF	GA	GD	Pts	Qualification
1	Atlético Bucaramanga	18	12	2	4	29	17	+12	38	Qualified for semifinals
2	Itagüí Ditaires	18	10	5	3	27	14	+13	35	Qualified for semifinals
3	Deportivo Rionegro	18	10	5	3	20	13	+7	35	Qualified for semifinals
4	Unión Magdalena	18	7	7	4	23	16	+7	28	Qualified for semifinals
5	Atlético de la Sabana	18	7	4	7	18	23	−5	25	
6	Real Santander	18	6	5	7	20	17	+3	23	
7	Valledupar	18	5	7	6	18	19	−1	22	
8	Barranquilla	18	4	4	10	16	24	−8	16	
9	Alianza Petrolera	18	0	5	13	11	30	−19	5	

==== Group B ====
Pos	Team	Pld	W	D	L	GF	GA	GD	Pts	Qualification
1	Patriotas	18	7	7	4	22	18	+4	28	Qualified for semifinals
2	Cortuluá	18	7	6	5	23	18	+5	27	Qualified for semifinals
3	Expreso Rojo	18	7	6	5	19	17	+2	27	Qualified for semifinals
4	Deportes Palmira	18	7	6	5	18	17	+1	27	Qualified for semifinals
5	Bogotá	18	7	4	7	14	16	−2	25	
6	Academia	18	6	6	6	18	22	−4	24	
7	Juventud Soacha	18	6	5	7	24	22	+2	23	
8	Centauros	18	5	4	9	21	28	−7	19	
9	Dépor	18	3	4	11	15	25	−10	13	

=== Semifinals ===
==== Group A ====
Pos	Team	Pld	W	D	L	GF	GA	GD	Pts	Qualification
1	Cortuluá	6	5	1	0	7	2	+5	16	Qualified for the final
2	Deportivo Rionegro	6	3	2	1	9	6	+3	11	
3	Deportes Palmira	6	1	1	4	6	10	−4	4	
4	Atlético Bucaramanga	6	1	0	5	3	7	−4	3	

==== Group B ====
Pos	Team	Pld	W	D	L	GF	GA	GD	Pts	Qualification
1	Itagüí Ditaires	6	3	2	1	6	4	+2	11	Qualified for the final
2	Expreso Rojo	6	2	3	1	5	3	+2	9	
3	Patriotas	6	1	3	2	5	7	−2	6	
4	Unión Magdalena	6	1	2	3	5	7	−2	5	

=== Finals ===
June 15, 2009
20:30

Cortuluá	3–1	Itagüí Ditaires

Estadio Doce de Octubre, Tuluá

June 20, 2009
15:30

Itagüí Ditaires	2–0	Cortuluá
Penalties
	5–6

Estadio Metropolitano Ciudad de Itagüí, Itagüí

Tied 3–3 on aggregate, Cortuluá won on penalties.

Copa Premier
2009–I Winners
Cortuluá
Advanced to the Championship Final

== Torneo Finalización ==
=== First stage ===
==== Group A ====
Pos	Team	Pld	W	D	L	GF	GA	GD	Pts	Qualification
1	Itagüí Ditaires	18	9	6	3	28	22	+6	33	Qualified for semifinals
2	Atlético Bucaramanga	18	9	5	4	37	21	+16	32	Qualified for semifinals
3	Bogotá	18	7	7	4	28	17	+11	28	Qualified for semifinals
4	Real Santander	18	7	7	4	22	21	+1	28	Qualified for semifinals
5	Patriotas	18	7	3	8	23	24	−1	24	
6	Barranquilla	18	6	5	7	20	21	−1	23	
7	Deportes Palmira	18	6	1	11	17	29	−12	19	
8	Valledupar	18	6	1	11	14	29	−15	19	
9	Dépor	18	4	5	9	21	26	−5	17	

==== Group B ====
Pos	Team	Pld	W	D	L	GF	GA	GD	Pts	Qualification
1	Centauros	18	9	4	5	27	17	+10	31	Qualified for semifinals
2	Atlético de la Sabana	18	8	6	4	30	21	+9	30	Qualified for semifinals
3	Unión Magdalena	18	8	5	5	34	19	+15	29	Qualified for semifinals
4	Deportivo Rionegro	18	8	4	6	22	21	+1	28	Qualified for semifinals
5	Juventud Soacha	18	7	6	5	20	22	−2	27	
6	Expreso Rojo	18	7	5	6	18	16	+2	26	
7	Academia	18	7	4	7	27	25	+2	25	
8	Cortuluá	18	6	5	7	21	22	−1	23	
9	Alianza Petrolera	18	1	1	16	7	43	−36	4	

=== Semifinals ===
==== Group A ====
Pos	Team	Pld	W	D	L	GF	GA	GD	Pts	Qualification
1	Atlético de la Sabana	6	3	1	2	8	6	+2	10 (Note: Atlético de la Sabana qualified for having earned more points in the first stage.)	Qualified for the final
2	Bogotá	6	3	1	2	12	7	+5	10	
3	Deportivo Rionegro	6	3	1	2	8	9	−1	10	
4	Itagüí Ditaires	6	0	3	3	7	13	−6	3	

==== Group B ====
Pos	Team	Pld	W	D	L	GF	GA	GD	Pts	Qualification
1	Atlético Bucaramanga	6	3	2	1	8	4	+4	11	Qualified for the final
2	Centauros	6	2	2	2	5	6	−1	8	
3	Unión Magdalena	6	2	2	2	6	7	−1	8	
4	Real Santander	6	0	4	2	4	6	−2	4	

=== Finals ===
November 14, 2009
15:30

Atlético de la Sabana	1–1	Atlético Bucaramanga

Estadio Arturo Cumplido Sierra, Sincelejo

November 21, 2009
15:30

Atlético Bucaramanga	2–1	Atlético de la Sabana

Estadio Alfonso López, Bucaramanga

Atlético Bucaramanga won 3–2 on aggregate.

Copa Premier
2009–II Winners
Atlético Bucaramanga
Advanced to the Championship Final

== Championship final ==
November 25, 2009
20:30

Cortuluá	3–0	Atlético Bucaramanga

Estadio Doce de Octubre, Tuluá

November 29, 2009
15:30

Atlético Bucaramanga	1–1	Cortuluá

Estadio Alfonso López, Bucaramanga

Cortuluá won 4–1 on aggregate.

Copa Premier
2009 champions
Cortuluá
2nd title

== Promotion/relegation playoff ==
As the second worst team in the 2009 Categoría Primera A relegation table, Deportivo Pereira had to play a two-legged tie against Atlético Bucaramanga, the Primera B runners-up. As the Primera A team, Deportivo Pereira played the second leg at home. The winner competed in the Primera A for the 2009 season, while the loser competed in the Primera B.

Team 1	Agg.	Team 2	1st leg	2nd leg
Atlético Bucaramanga	3–5	Deportivo Pereira	1–2	2–3
