= Jonathan Torres (footballer, born 1989) =

Colombian footballer

Personal information
- Full name: Jonathan Torres
- Date of birth: 11 September 1989 (age 37)
- Place of birth: Florida, Colombia
- Height: 1.87 m (6 ft 2 in)
- Position: Defender

Senior career*
Years	Team	Apps	(Gls)
2007	Deportivo Cali	1	(0)
2008	Córdoba	22	(3)
2009	Atlético La Sabana	2	(0)
2009	Deportes Palmira	6	(2)
2010	Pacífico	15	(1)
2015–2016	San Jorge	9	(1)
- * Club domestic league appearances and goals

Jonathan Torres (born 11 September 1989) is a Colombian footballer who plays as a defender. He is currently a free agent.

== Career ==
Torres made his professional debut for Deportivo Cali during the 2007 Categoría Primera A season, which preceded a 2008 move to Categoría Primera B side Córdoba. Three goals in twenty-two fixtures followed. 2009 saw Torres join Atlético La Sabana, months before he completed a passage through fellow tier two team Deportes Palmira. In 2010, Torres agreed to sign for Pacífico, a successor club of Deportes Palmira, making fifteen appearances and scoring one goal during the 2010 campaign. San Jorge of Torneo Federal B signed Torres in 2015. He scored once in nine matches for the Argentine club in two years.

== Career statistics ==
As of 17 November 2018.

Club statistics
Club	Season	League			Cup (Note: Includes the Copa Colombia and Copa Argentina)		League Cup		Continental		Other		Total	
Club	Season	Division	Apps	Goals	Apps	Goals	Apps	Goals	Apps	Goals	Apps	Goals	Apps	Goals
Deportivo Cali	2007	Categoría Primera A	1	0	—		—		—		0	0	1	0
Córdoba	2008	Categoría Primera B	22	3	0	0	—		—		0	0	22	3
Atlético La Sabana	2009	Categoría Primera B	2	0	0	0	—		—		0	0	2	0
Deportes Palmira	2009	Categoría Primera B	6	2	0	0	—		—		0	0	6	6
Pacífico	2010	Categoría Primera B	15	1	0	0	—		—		0	0	15	1
San Jorge	2015	Torneo Federal B	3	1	0	0	—		—		0	0	3	1
San Jorge	2016	Torneo Federal B	6	0	0	0	—		—		0	0	6	0
Career total			49	7	0	0	—		—		0	0	49	7
