= José Adolfo Valencia =

Colombian footballer (born 1991)

José Valencia
Personal information
- Full name: José Adolfo Valencia Arrechea
- Date of birth: 18 December 1991 (age 34)
- Place of birth: Bogotá, Colombia
- Height: 1.85 m (6 ft 1 in)
- Position: Forward

Team information
- Current team: Cajamarca
- Number: 20

Senior career*
Years	Team	Apps	(Gls)
2008–2012	Santa Fe	45	(5)
2008	→ Juventud Soacha (loan)	10	(5)
2012	→ Portland Timbers (loan)	0	(0)
2013–2014	Portland Timbers	21	(7)
2014	→ Olimpo (loan)	19	(7)
2014–2015	Rosario Central	14	(4)
2015	→ Independiente (loan)	9	(1)
2016	Once Caldas	7	(2)
2017	Santa Fe	12	(1)
2017–2019	Feirense	29	(3)
2019	Central Córdoba	8	(0)
2020	Delfín	19	(3)
2021–2022	Deportivo Pereira	24	(2)
2022	Atlético Bucaramanga	6	(0)
2023	Yangon United	6	(6)
2023–2024	PSMS Medan	5	(2)

International career
2010–2011	Colombia U20	6	(1)
- * Club domestic league appearances and goals as of 17 December 2023

José Adolfo Valencia Arrechea (born 18 December 1991), commonly known as José Valencia, is a Colombian footballer who plays as a forward.

== Club career ==
Valencia began his career with Santa Fe, also spending time on loan in 2008 with Juventud Soacha. After making ten appearances and scoring five goals for Juventud Soacha, Valencia returned to Santa Fe. In 2009, he was a member of the squad that captured the Copa Colombia.

Valencia signed on loan with Portland Timbers of Major League Soccer on 15 December 2011. He was signed as Portland's second designated player under the new Young DP rule. On 3 February 2012, the club announced that Valencia would undergo knee surgery and miss 6–12 months. Due to his injury, MLS agreed that Valencia would not count as a designated player in 2012.

Portland announced the full transfer of Valencia from Santa Fe on 22 January 2013. That day the club also announced it had signed Valencia to a multi-year contract. On 18 May 2013 Valencia tallied his first goal for Portland in a 2–2 draw at rivals Vancouver Whitecaps FC. On 15 January 2014, Valencia joined Club Olimpo in the Argentine Primera División on a season-long loan deal, although he stayed with Olimpo until June 2014, in process scoring 7 goals. Valencia was transferred from Portland to Rosario Central on 23 August 2014, scoring four goals in 14 appearances during the second half of 2014 Argentine Primera División.

In Argentina, Valencia played for Rosario Central where he managed to score four times during his 14 games. Next year, he would play for Club Atlético Independiente on loan. After negotiations for a full contract between Valencia's agent and Club Atlético Independiente broke, Valencia was signed by Manizales' side Once Caldas on 9 August 2016.

Back in Colombia, El Trencito played seven matches and scored two goals for Once Caldas. In 2017, his performance called the attention of Gustavo Costas, head coach of his former club Independiente Santa Fe, who got his signature for the 2017-I season.

Joined Delfín on 6 January 2020. Made eight appearances, including five starts, in the 2020 Copa Libertadores as Delfin reached the Round of 16. Delfin finished the 2020 Ecuadorian Serie A season in 10th place in the aggregate table, missing out on qualifying for the Copa Libertadores and Copa Sudamericana. Valencia appeared in 19 of Delfin's 30 league matches in 2020, scoring three goals. On 22 June 2023, he moved to Yangon United.

On 4 November 2023, he signed a contract with Indonesian club PSMS Medan to play in the second round of 2023–24 Liga 2.

== International career ==
Valencia has represented Colombia at the Under-20 level. He played for Colombia at the 2011 FIFA U-20 World Cup and scored 1 goal in the competition.

== Personal ==
Valencia is the son of the Colombian international footballer Adolfo Valencia, who played for European teams such as Bayern Munich and Atlético Madrid, and also in the Colombia national football team.

== Career statistics ==
As of match played 25 July 2023

Yangon United
2023	6	7	2
Total	6	7	2

== Honours ==
Santa Fe

- Copa Colombia (1): 2009
- Superliga Colombiana (1): 2017
