= Carlos Bejarano =

Footballer (born 1985)

Personal information
- Full name: Carlos Andrés Bejarano Palacios
- Date of birth: 29 January 1985 (age 41)
- Place of birth: Quibdó, Colombia
- Height: 1.84 m (6 ft 0 in)
- Position: Goalkeeper

Team information
- Current team: Unión Magdalena
- Number: 1

Youth career
- Córdoba

Senior career*
Years	Team	Apps	(Gls)
2007–2012	Equidad	56	(0)
2009–2010	→ Arabe Unido (loan)	21	(1)
2011–2012	→ AS Trenčín (loan)	0	(0)
2012–2014	Independiente Medellín	22	(0)
2015–2019	América de Cali	128	(0)
2019	Deportivo Pasto	15	(0)
2020–2021	Rionegro Águilas	43	(0)
2022–	Unión Magdalena	30	(0)

International career
2013–2014	Equatorial Guinea	2	(0)
- * Club domestic league appearances and goals as of 31 December 2023 (UTC)

Carlos Andrés Bejarano Palacios (born 29 January 1985) is a professional footballer who plays as a goalkeeper for Rionegro Águilas of the Colombian First Division.

Born and raised in Colombia, he has been naturalized by Equatorial Guinea and played for that national team, despite not complying with FIFA eligibility rules.

== Honours ==
La Equidad

- Copa Colombia: 2008 Copa Colombia

Árabe Unido

- Liga Panameña de Fútbol: Apertura 2009 II

América de Cali

- Categoría Primera B: 2016
