= 2019 Categoría Primera B season =

Torneo Águila
- Season: 2019
- Dates: 2 February – 6 December 2019
- Champions: Deportivo Pereira (2nd title)
- Promoted: Deportivo Pereira; Boyacá Chicó
- Matches: 294
- Goals: 701 (2.38 per match)
- Top goalscorer: Torneo I: 3 players (12 goals each); Torneo II: Juan Sebastián Herrera (12 goals)
- Biggest home win: Deportivo Pereira 6–0 Tigres (18 March); Cortuluá 6–0 Valledupar (14 October)
- Biggest away win: Tigres 0–5 Deportivo Pereira (16 November)
- Highest scoring: Orsomarso 4–4 Boyacá Chicó (22 September)

The 2019 Categoría Primera B season (officially known as the 2019 Torneo Águila season for sponsorship reasons) was the 30th season since its founding as Colombia's second division football league.

== Format ==
For this season, the league returned to the format used in 2017. The season consisted of two tournaments (Torneo I and Torneo II) with three stages each. In the first stage of both tournaments, the 16 clubs played each other once, for a total of 15 games. The top eight teams after the first stage advanced to the semifinal round where they were sorted into two groups of four and played a double round-robin tournament group stage, with the top team of each group qualifying for the finals. The winners of both tournaments would play a final series on a home-and-away basis, with the winner being crowned as the season champions and also earning promotion to the Categoría Primera A for the 2020 season. The season runners-up would then play the best team in the aggregate table (other than the champions) in another double-legged series for the second promotion berth. In case the season runner-up also ended up as the best team in the aggregate table, it would also be promoted and the promotion play-off would not be played.

== Teams ==
16 teams took part, fourteen of them returning from last season plus Boyacá Chicó and Leones, who were relegated from the 2018 Primera A after one year in the top flight. Both teams replaced Cúcuta Deportivo and Unión Magdalena who earned promotion at the end of the last season. Also, starting from this season, Real Santander moved its home games to San Andrés Island, becoming Real San Andrés.

On 12 March 2019, the General Assembly of DIMAYOR approved a proposal to relocate Universitario from Popayán to Cali starting from the second half of the season, with the aforementioned club being effectively rebranded as Boca Juniors de Cali. Universitario played its last match in the tournament under that name on 4 May 2019, losing to Deportivo Pereira in Palmira by a 4–1 score.

Locations of the 2019 Categoría Primera B teams

Club	Home city	Stadium	Capacity
Atlético	Cali	Pascual Guerrero	33,130
Barranquilla	Barranquilla	Romelio Martínez	20,000
Boca Juniors de Cali	Cali	Pascual Guerrero	33,130
Bogotá	Bogotá	Metropolitano de Techo	8,000
Boyacá Chicó	Tunja	La Independencia	20,630
Cortuluá	Tuluá	Doce de Octubre	16,000
Deportes Quindío	Armenia	Centenario	20,716
Deportivo Pereira	Pereira	Hernán Ramírez Villegas	30,297
Fortaleza	Cota	Municipal de Cota	4,000
Leones	Itagüí	Metropolitano Ciudad de Itagüí	12,000
Llaneros	Villavicencio	Manuel Calle Lombana	15,000
Orsomarso	Palmira	Francisco Rivera Escobar	9,000
Real Cartagena	Cartagena	Jaime Morón León	16,068
Real San Andrés	San Andrés	Erwin O'Neill	5,000
Tigres	Bogotá	Metropolitano de Techo	8,000
Universitario	Popayán	Ciro López^{a}	5,000
Valledupar	Valledupar	Armando Maestre Pavajeau	11,000

a: Universitario played their home matches against Llaneros, Bogotá, Leones and Deportivo Pereira at Estadio Deportivo Cali in Palmira.

Only participated in the Torneo I.
Replaced Universitario for the Torneo II.

== Torneo I ==
=== First stage ===
==== Standings ====
Pos	Team	Pld	W	D	L	GF	GA	GD	Pts	Qualification
1	Real Cartagena	15	8	5	2	26	15	+11	29	Advance to the semifinals
2	Deportes Quindío	15	8	5	2	23	12	+11	29	Advance to the semifinals
3	Deportivo Pereira	15	8	4	3	26	10	+16	28	Advance to the semifinals
4	Barranquilla	15	7	5	3	20	15	+5	26	Advance to the semifinals
5	Boyacá Chicó	15	6	7	2	16	10	+6	25	Advance to the semifinals
6	Cortuluá	15	7	3	5	26	22	+4	24	Advance to the semifinals
7	Leones	15	6	6	3	16	12	+4	24	Advance to the semifinals
8	Llaneros	15	7	2	6	26	24	+2	23	Advance to the semifinals
9	Bogotá	15	6	4	5	16	19	−3	22	
10	Tigres	15	5	5	5	20	24	−4	20	
11	Fortaleza	15	5	4	6	21	22	−1	19	
12	Valledupar	15	3	5	7	13	20	−7	14	
13	Universitario	15	2	6	7	12	20	−8	12	
14	Real San Andrés	15	1	7	7	13	24	−11	10	
15	Atlético	15	1	5	9	9	25	−16	8	
16	Orsomarso	15	0	7	8	16	25	−9	7	

Source: Dimayor, Soccerway
Rules for classification: 1) Points, 2) Goal difference, 3) Goals for, 4) Away goals for, 5) Away goals against, 6) Drawing of lots

==== Results ====
Home \ Away	ATL	BAR	BOG	BOY	COR	QUI	PER	FOR	LEO	LLA	ORS	RCA	RSA	TIG	UPO	VAL
Atlético	—	—	—	1–2	0–2	1–0	—	0–1	—	—	—	0–3	0–1	—	—	—
Barranquilla	1–0	—	—	0–0	2–2	—	—	2–0	—	—	—	2–1	2–0	—	—	3–0
Bogotá	0–0	0–2	—	—	3–2	—	1–1	—	—	2–5	—	1–0	1–0	—	—	2–1
Boyacá Chicó	—	—	0–0	—	—	1–1	0–0	3–1	2–1	—	0–0	—	—	0–1	2–0	—
Cortuluá	—	—	—	0–0	—	1–3	2–1	3–2	0–1	—	2–0	—	—	2–1	1–0	—
Deportes Quindío	—	2–2	4–1	—	—	—	—	—	0–0	1–0	1–1	—	—	3–1	2–1	—
Deportivo Pereira	4–0	2–1	—	—	—	0–1	—	—	—	—	1–0	—	1–0	6–0	—	2–0
Fortaleza	—	—	2–0	—	—	0–2	1–2	—	4–1	2–1	2–2	—	—	0–0	3–1	—
Leones	4–2	0–0	1–0	—	—	—	1–0	—	—	0–1	—	1–1	3–0	—	—	0–0
Llaneros	3–1	3–1	—	3–3	3–2	—	0–0	—	—	—	—	0–2	2–0	—	—	0–1
Orsomarso	1–1	1–2	1–2	—	—	—	—	—	1–2	2–3	—	—	—	—	2–2	1–2
Real Cartagena	—	—	—	2–1	3–2	2–1	2–2	2–0	—	—	1–1	—	—	2–0	1–0	—
Real San Andrés	—	—	—	0–1	2–2	1–1	—	2–2	—	—	2–2	3–3	—	1–1	—	—
Tigres	1–1	4–0	0–3	—	—	—	—	—	1–1	4–2	2–1	—	—	—	2–0	—
Universitario	1–1	0–0	0–0	—	—	—	1–4	—	0–0	3–0	—	—	1–1	—	—	2–1
Valledupar	1–1	—	—	0–1	1–3	0–1	—	1–1	—	—	—	1–1	2–0	2–2	—	—

Source: Dimayor, Soccerway
Legend: Blue = home team win; Yellow = draw; Red = away team win.

=== Semifinals ===
The eight teams that advanced to the semifinals were drawn into two groups of four teams. The winners of each group advanced to the finals.

==== Group A ====
Pos	Team	Pld	W	D	L	GF	GA	GD	Pts	Qualification	COR	RCA	LEO	BAR
1	Cortuluá	6	4	1	1	11	4	+7	13	Advance to the Finals	—	3–0	3–0	2–0
2	Real Cartagena	6	3	2	1	11	8	+3	11		1–1	—	4–1	2–1
3	Leones	6	2	1	3	6	11	−5	7		3–1	1–1	—	1–0
4	Barranquilla	6	1	0	5	4	9	−5	3		0–1	1–3	2–0	—

Source: Dimayor
Legend: Blue = home team win; Yellow = draw; Red = away team win.
Rules for classification: 1) Points, 2) Goal difference, 3) Goals for, 4) Away goals for, 5) Away goals against, 6) Drawing of lots.

==== Group B ====
Pos	Team	Pld	W	D	L	GF	GA	GD	Pts	Qualification	PER	BOY	QUI	LLA
1	Deportivo Pereira	6	5	0	1	9	4	+5	15	Advance to the Finals	—	1–2	2–1	1–0
2	Boyacá Chicó	6	4	1	1	9	2	+7	13		0–1	—	1–0	0–0
3	Deportes Quindío	6	1	1	4	5	9	−4	4		0–2	0–3 (Note: Match awarded 3–0 to Boyacá Chicó due to crowd disturbances. The match originally ended with a 0–1 win for Boyacá Chicó.)	—	3–0
4	Llaneros	6	0	2	4	2	10	−8	2		1–2	0–3	1–1	—

Source: Dimayor
Legend: Blue = home team win; Yellow = draw; Red = away team win.
Rules for classification: 1) Points, 2) Goal difference, 3) Goals for, 4) Away goals for, 5) Away goals against, 6) Drawing of lots.

=== Finals ===
6 June 2019
15:30

Cortuluá	2–1	Deportivo Pereira
Herrera 24'; Roa 55'	Report	Álvarez 74'

Estadio Doce de Octubre, Tuluá
Referee: Carlos Ortega

10 June 2019
19:30

Deportivo Pereira	2–1	Cortuluá
Molina 31'; Álvarez 70'	Report	Roa 43'
Penalties
Álvarez (penalty scored); Navarro (penalty scored); Molina (penalty scored); Casierra (penalty missed)	3–1	(penalty missed) Herrera; (penalty scored) Correa; (penalty missed) Lazso; (penalty missed) Montoya

Estadio Hernán Ramírez Villegas, Pereira
Referee: Gustavo Murillo

Tied 3–3 on aggregate, Deportivo Pereira won on penalties.

Torneo Águila
2019–I Winners

=== Top goalscorers ===
Rank	Name	Club	Goals
1	(Colombia) Diego Álvarez	Deportivo Pereira	12
1	(Colombia) Juan Sebastián Herrera	Cortuluá	12
1	(Colombia) Guillermo Murillo	Cortuluá	12
4	(Panama) Edwin Aguilar	Real Cartagena	11
4	(Colombia) Jairo Molina	Deportivo Pereira	11
6	(Colombia) Jhonny Cano	Real Cartagena	8
7	(Sweden) Kevin Aladesanmi	Leones	7
7	(Colombia) Leonel García	Atlético	7
7	(Colombia) Danny Santoya	Deportes Quindío	7

Source: Soccerway

== Torneo II ==
=== First stage ===
==== Standings ====
Pos	Team	Pld	W	D	L	GF	GA	GD	Pts	Qualification
1	Deportes Quindío	15	8	5	2	21	12	+9	29	Advance to the semifinals
2	Boyacá Chicó	15	8	3	4	25	19	+6	27	Advance to the semifinals
3	Bogotá	15	8	2	5	19	14	+5	26	Advance to the semifinals
4	Cortuluá	15	8	1	6	24	19	+5	25	Advance to the semifinals
5	Deportivo Pereira	15	6	7	2	13	9	+4	25	Advance to the semifinals
6	Real Cartagena	15	7	3	5	20	19	+1	24	Advance to the semifinals
7	Fortaleza	15	6	4	5	18	15	+3	22	Advance to the semifinals
8	Tigres	15	5	6	4	17	14	+3	21	Advance to the semifinals
9	Leones	15	4	9	2	19	17	+2	21	
10	Real San Andrés	15	6	2	7	16	17	−1	20	
11	Llaneros	15	6	1	8	12	15	−3	19	
12	Valledupar	15	4	7	4	14	19	−5	19	
13	Atlético	15	4	6	5	15	13	+2	18	
14	Boca Juniors de Cali	15	3	2	10	15	25	−10	11	
15	Barranquilla	15	2	5	8	10	21	−11	11	
16	Orsomarso	15	1	5	9	13	23	−10	8	

Source: Dimayor, Soccerway
Rules for classification: 1) Points, 2) Goal difference, 3) Goals for, 4) Away goals for, 5) Away goals against, 6) Drawing of lots

==== Results ====
Home \ Away	ATL	BAR	BOC	BOG	BOY	COR	QUI	PER	FOR	LEO	LLA	ORS	RCA	RSA	TIG	VAL
Atlético	—	0–0	2–1	0–1	—	—	—	0–0	—	1–1	1–2	1–0	—	—	1–1	0–0
Barranquilla	—	—	3–1	0–2	—	—	0–2	1–1	—	2–2	1–0	0–0	—	—	1–1	—
Boca Juniors de Cali	—	—	—	—	2–2	3–2	0–2	—	0–1	—	—	2–1	1–2	—	2–0	—
Bogotá	—	—	2–0	—	0–1	—	2–1	—	2–0	3–3	—	2–1	—	—	0–3	—
Boyacá Chicó	2–0	4–0	—	—	—	3–2	—	—	—	—	1–0	—	5–2	1–0	—	1–0
Cortuluá	3–2	2–0	—	1–0	—	—	—	—	—	—	1–0	—	1–0	1–0	—	6–0
Deportes Quindío	0–4	—	—	—	3–0	1–1	—	1–1	1–1	—	—	—	2–0	1–0	—	0–0
Deportivo Pereira	—	—	1–0	1–0	1–0	2–0	—	—	1–0	1–1	1–0	—	0–0	—	—	—
Fortaleza	1–1	2–1	—	—	3–0	4–2	—	—	—	—	—	—	1–0	3–0	—	0–0
Leones	—	—	2–2	—	1–0	1–0	2–3	—	0–0	—	—	2–0	—	—	0–0	—
Llaneros	—	—	1–0	0–2	—	—	0–1	—	2–0	1–1	—	2–0	—	—	1–3	—
Orsomarso	—	—	—	—	4–4	1–2	1–1	1–1	2–0	—	—	—	1–2	0–1	0–0	—
Real Cartagena	1–0	2–1	—	2–1	—	—	—	—	—	0–1	3–0	—	—	3–3	—	2–2
Real San Andrés	0–2	1–0	2–0	0–1	—	—	—	3–1	—	3–1	0–1	—	—	—	—	2–1
Tigres	—	—	—	—	1–1	2–0	0–2	1–0	3–2	—	—	—	0–1	1–1	—	1–2
Valledupar	—	1–0	2–1	1–1	—	—	—	1–1	—	1–1	0–2	3–1	—	—	—	—

Source: Dimayor, Soccerway
Legend: Blue = home team win; Yellow = draw; Red = away team win.

=== Semifinals ===
The eight teams that advanced to the semifinals were drawn into two groups of four teams. The winners of each group will advance to the finals.

==== Group A ====
Pos	Team	Pld	W	D	L	GF	GA	GD	Pts	Qualification	PER	COR	TIG	QUI
1	Deportivo Pereira	6	4	1	1	11	4	+7	13	Advance to the Finals	—	1–0	1–1	1–0
2	Cortuluá	6	3	2	1	10	6	+4	11		3–1	—	2–0	1–0
3	Tigres	6	1	3	2	6	12	−6	6		0–5	1–1	—	4–3
4	Deportes Quindío	6	0	2	4	6	11	−5	2		0–2	3–3	0–0	—

Source: Dimayor
Legend: Blue = home team win; Yellow = draw; Red = away team win.
Rules for classification: 1) Points, 2) Goal difference, 3) Goals for, 4) Away goals for, 5) Away goals against, 6) Drawing of lots.

==== Group B ====
Pos	Team	Pld	W	D	L	GF	GA	GD	Pts	Qualification	BOY	FOR	RCA	BOG
1	Boyacá Chicó	6	4	2	0	9	4	+5	14	Advance to the Finals	—	1–1	2–1	1–1
2	Fortaleza	6	2	2	2	10	9	+1	8		0–2	—	1–3	3–1
3	Real Cartagena	6	2	2	2	8	7	+1	8		0–1	2–2	—	1–0
4	Bogotá	6	0	2	4	4	11	−7	2		1–2	0–3	1–1	—

Source: Dimayor
Legend: Blue = home team win; Yellow = draw; Red = away team win.
Rules for classification: 1) Points, 2) Goal difference, 3) Goals for, 4) Away goals for, 5) Away goals against, 6) Drawing of lots.

=== Finals ===
22 November 2019
18:30

Deportivo Pereira	2–1	Boyacá Chicó
Posada 40'; Vásquez 82'	Report	Palomino 73'

Estadio Hernán Ramírez Villegas, Pereira
Referee: Luis Fernando Trujillo

26 November 2019
20:00

Boyacá Chicó	1–1	Deportivo Pereira
Urueña 87'	Report	Vásquez 30'

Estadio La Independencia, Tunja
Referee: Óscar Gómez

Deportivo Pereira won 3–2 on aggregate.

Torneo Águila
2019–II Winners

=== Top goalscorers ===
Rank	Name	Club	Goals
1	(Colombia) Juan Sebastián Herrera	Cortuluá	12
2	(Colombia) Edinson Palomino	Boyacá Chicó	11
3	(Colombia) Sebastián Acosta	Fortaleza	10
4	(Colombia) Cristian Cangá	Valledupar	8
5	(Panama) Edwin Aguilar	Real Cartagena	7
5	(Colombia) Diber Cambindo	Deportes Quindío	7
5	(Colombia) Leonel García	Atlético	7
5	(Colombia) Jairo Molina	Deportivo Pereira	7
9	(Sweden) Kevin Aladesanmi	Leones	6
9	(Colombia) Henry Hernández	Deportes Quindío	6
9	(Colombia) Yorleys Mena	Real Cartagena	6
9	(Colombia) Luis Mina	Boca Juniors de Cali	6
9	(Colombia) José Carlos Muñoz	Cortuluá	6

Source: Soccerway

== Grand Final ==
Since Deportivo Pereira won both tournaments of the season, the Grand Final was not played and they were declared as champions of the season. Deportivo Pereira also earned direct promotion to Categoría Primera A for the 2020 season.

Torneo Águila
2019 champions

2nd title

== Aggregate table ==
Pos	Team	Pld	W	D	L	GF	GA	GD	Pts	Qualification
1	Deportivo Pereira (C, P)	46	25	13	8	65	32	+33	88	Promotion to Categoría Primera A
2	Boyacá Chicó (P)	46	23	15	8	62	37	+25	84	Qualification for Promotion play-off
3	Cortuluá	46	23	8	15	74	55	+19	77	Qualification for Promotion play-off
4	Real Cartagena	42	20	12	10	65	49	+16	72	
5	Deportes Quindío	42	17	13	12	55	44	+11	64	
6	Leones	36	12	16	8	41	40	+1	52	
7	Bogotá	36	14	8	14	39	44	−5	50	
8	Fortaleza	36	13	10	13	49	46	+3	49	
9	Tigres	36	11	14	11	43	50	−7	47	
10	Llaneros	36	13	5	18	40	49	−9	44	
11	Barranquilla	36	10	10	16	34	45	−11	40	
12	Valledupar	30	7	12	11	27	39	−12	33	
13	Real San Andrés	30	7	9	14	29	41	−12	30	
14	Atlético	30	5	11	14	24	38	−14	26	
15	Boca Juniors de Cali	30	5	8	17	27	45	−18	23	
16	Orsomarso	30	1	12	17	29	48	−19	15	

Source: Dimayor
Rules for classification: 1) Points, 2) Goal difference, 3) Goals for, 4) Away goals for, 5) Away goals against, 6) Drawing of lots
(C) Champions; (P) Promoted

== Promotion play-off ==
The promotion play-off was played by Boyacá Chicó and Cortuluá, who were the best two teams in the aggregate table excluding the champions, Deportivo Pereira. The winners of this double-legged series earned the second promotion berth.

1 December 2019
15:15

Cortuluá	0–0	Boyacá Chicó
	Report

Estadio Doce de Octubre, Tuluá
Referee: Carlos Ortega

6 December 2019
20:00

Boyacá Chicó	1–0	Cortuluá
Vela 56'	Report

Estadio La Independencia, Tunja
Referee: Óscar Gómez

Boyacá Chicó won 1–0 on aggregate.

== See also ==
- 2019 Categoría Primera A season
- 2019 Copa Colombia
