= 2009 Copa Colombia =

Copa Postobón 2009

Tournament details
- Country: Colombia
- Teams: 36

Final positions
- Champions: Santa Fe (2nd title)
- Runners-up: Deportivo Pasto

Tournament statistics
- Matches played: 204
- Goals scored: 525 (2.57 per match)
- Top goal scorer: Carlos Bacca (11 goals)

The 2009 Copa Colombia football tournament, officially the 2009 Copa Postobón for sponsorship reasons, was the seventh edition of the Copa Colombia, the national football cup competition for clubs of Colombia's DIMAYOR league. It began on March 4 and ended on November 18. Santa Fe won the tournament for their 2nd title.

== Format ==
The format for 2009 remains the same as last year's. The winner of will earn a berth in the 2010 Copa Sudamericana.

== Phase I ==
Teams advanced to Phase II

=== Group A ===
Group A comprises teams from the Caribbean Region.

Team	Pld	W	D	L	GF	GA	GD	Pts
Atlético La Sabana	10	7	1	2	19	11	+8	22
Junior	10	6	3	1	18	7	+11	21
Barranquilla	10	5	3	2	13	11	+2	18
Real Cartagena	10	3	2	5	9	14	−5	11
Valledupar	10	3	0	7	10	17	−7	9
Unión Magdalena	10	1	1	8	6	15	−9	4

	LSA	BAR	JUN	RCA	UMA	VAL
Atlético La Sabana	–	3–1	1–1	2–0	2–0	4–1
Barranquilla	1–2	–	0–0	1–1	1–1	1–0
Junior	3–0	2–3	–	2–0	2–0	4–1
Real Cartagena	1–2	2–3	1–1	–	1–0	2–0
Unión Magdalena	1–2	0–1	1–2	1–2	–	2–1
Valledupar	3–2	0–1	0–1	3–0	1–0	–

=== Group B ===
Group B comprises teams from the Paisa Region.

Team	Pld	W	D	L	GF	GA	GD	Pts
Independiente Medellín	10	5	4	1	17	8	+9	19
Atlético Nacional	10	3	6	1	15	10	+5	15
Once Caldas	10	4	3	3	10	8	+2	15
Itagüí Ditaires	10	4	1	5	12	13	−1	13
Envigado	10	4	1	5	10	15	−5	13
Deportivo Rionegro	10	1	3	6	4	14	−10	6

	NAC	RIO	ENV	MED	ITA	OCA
Atlético Nacional	–	0–0	1–1	3–3	4–2	3–1
D. Rionegro	1–1	–	1–2	0–0	0–1	1–0
Envigado	0–3	2–1	–	2–1	0–2	1–0
Indepen. Medellín	2–0	2–0	2–1	–	3–1	1–1
Itagüí Ditaires	0–0	3–0	2–0	0–3	–	1–2
Once Caldas	0–0	3–0	2–1	0–0	1–0	–

=== Group C ===
Group C comprises teams from Santander, Norte de Santander, and Boyacá.

Team	Pld	W	D	L	GF	GA	GD	Pts
Cúcuta Deportivo	10	5	4	1	20	8	+12	19
Atlético Bucaramanga	10	5	3	2	21	15	+6	18
Patriotas	10	5	2	3	13	11	+2	17
Boyacá Chicó	10	2	4	4	12	14	−2	10
Real Santander	10	3	1	6	14	17	−3	10
Alianza Petrolera	10	2	2	6	8	23	−15	8

	ALP	BUC	BOY	CUC	PAT	RSA
Alianza Petrolera	–	2–1	1–1	1–1	0–1	2–1
Atl. Bucaramanga	3–1	–	2–0	2–2	3–2	3–0
Boyacá Chicó	5–0	2–2	–	0–0	0–0	1–0
Cúcuta Deportivo	4–0	3–0	4–0	–	2–0	1–1
Patriotas	2–1	1–1	1–0	4–2	–	2–0
Real Santander	4–0	2–4	4–3	0–1	2–0	–

=== Group D ===
Group D comprises teams from Bogotá and Villavicencio.

Team	Pld	W	D	L	GF	GA	GD	Pts
Millonarios	10	5	4	1	15	6	+9	19
Santa Fe	10	5	3	2	19	10	+9	18
La Equidad	10	4	4	2	12	10	+2	16
Academia	10	2	4	4	11	17	−6	10
Centauros	10	2	3	5	6	13	−7	9
Bogotá	10	2	2	6	10	18	−8	8

	ACA	BOG	CEN	EQU	MIL	SAF
Academia	–	3–2	0–0	1–1	0–2	3–3
Bogotá	2–1	–	2–0	2–2	1–1	0–4
Centauros	4–0	1–0	–	0–1	0–3	1–1
La Equidad	1–1	2–0	3–0	–	0–0	1–3
Millonarios	0–1	2–1	1–1	3–0	–	2–2
Santa Fe	2–1	2–0	2–0	0–1	0–1	–

=== Group E ===
Group E comprises teams from the Pacific Region.

Team	Pld	W	D	L	GF	GA	GD	Pts
Deportes Quindío	10	5	3	2	13	9	+6	18
Deportivo Pasto	10	5	2	3	17	12	+5	17
Deportivo Cali	10	4	2	4	12	15	−3	14
Depor	10	2	6	2	8	9	−1	12
Cortuluá	10	2	4	4	9	11	−2	10
América	10	2	3	5	9	12	−3	9

	AME	COR	DEP	QUI	CAL	PAS
América	–	0–1	0–0	2–1	2–3	1–2
Cortuluá	0–0	–	1–1	1–0	1–2	1–1
Depor	0–0	2–1	–	2–2	0–0	2–0
Deportes Quindío	2–1	0–0	1–0	–	2–0	3–2
Deportivo Cali	0–3	3–2	1–1	0–1	–	3–2
Deportivo Pasto	3–0	2–1	3–0	1–1	1–0	–

=== Group F ===
Group F comprises teams from Cundinamarca and the western part of the country.

Team	Pld	W	D	L	GF	GA	GD	Pts
Atlético Huila	10	6	2	2	15	10	+5	20
Expreso Rojo	10	5	3	2	12	9	+3	18
Deportivo Pereira	10	4	4	2	21	13	+8	15
Deportes Palmira	10	3	3	4	11	14	−3	12
Juventud Soacha	10	3	2	5	13	18	−5	11
Deportes Tolima	10	1	2	7	5	13	−8	5

	HUI	PAL	TOL	PER	EXR	JUS
Atlético Huila	–	4–1	3–0	1–1	1–0	3–2
Deportes Palmira	2–0	–	2–1	0–0	1–2	1–1
Deportes Tolima	0–1	0–1	–	0–1	2–1	0–1
Deportivo Pereira	4–1	3–1	1–1	–	0–0	6–1
Expreso Rojo	0–0	2–2	1–0	3–2	–	2–1
Juventud Soacha	0–1	1–0	1–1	5–3	0–1	–

== Phase II ==
Phase II began on August 26 and ended on September 2. Team #2 played the second leg at home.

Team #1	Points earned	Team #2	1st leg	2nd leg
Atlético La Sabana	0–6	Atlético Nacional	1–4	1–3
Independiente Medellín	3–3 (3–4 pk)	Junior	1–2	1–0
Cúcuta Deportivo	3–3 (4–5 pk)	Santa Fe	0–4	5–1
Millonarios	0–6	Atlético Bucaramanga	1–3	0–1
Deportes Quindío	4–1	Expreso Rojo	0–0	3–0
Atlético Huila	3–3 (6–7 pk)	Deportivo Pasto	0–1	2–1

== Phase III ==
Phase III began on September 16 and ended on September 23. Team #2 played the second leg at home.

Team #1	Points earned	Team #2	1st leg	2nd leg
Deportes Quindío	2–2 (3–5 pk)	Junior	0–0	2–2
Atlético Nacional	(gd) 3–3	Atlético Bucaramanga	2–0	0–1
Deportivo Pasto	(gd) 3–3	Santa Fe	3–1	1–2

== Semifinals ==
The semifinals began on October 28 and ended on November 4. Team #2 played the second leg at home.

Team #1	Points earned	Team #2	1st leg	2nd leg
Deportivo Pasto	6–0	Junior	3–1	2–1
Atlético Nacional	3–3 (2–4 pk)	Santa Fe	2–1	2–3

== Finals ==
The finals was played on November 11 and November 18. Team #2 played the second leg at home.

November 11, 2009
20:10 (UTC-5)

Deportivo Pasto	2–1	Santa Fe
Rodríguez 54'; H. Centurión 90+3' (pen.)	Report	Anchico 84'

Estadio Departamental Libertad, Pasto
Referee: José Luis Niño

November 18, 2009
20:15 (UTC-5)

Santa Fe	2–1	Deportivo Pasto
Pérez 54', 88' (pen.)	Report	Castro 44'
Penalties
Valdés (penalty missed); Quintero (penalty scored); M. González (penalty missed); Pérez (penalty scored); Anchico (penalty missed); Seijas (penalty scored); A. González (penalty scored); Gómez (penalty scored)	5–4	(penalty missed) H. Centurión; (penalty scored) Madera; (penalty scored) Rodríguez; (penalty missed) Mosquera; (penalty missed) G. Centurión; (penalty scored) Villamil; (penalty scored) Mesa; (penalty missed) Altamirano

Estadio El Campín, Bogotá
Referee: Francisco Peñuela

Copa Postobón
2009 Champion
Santa Fe
2nd Title

== Top goalscorers ==
Pos	Name	Club	Goals
1	(Colombia) Carlos Bacca	Junior	11
2	(Colombia) Jorge Enrique Vargas	Atlético La Sabana	7
3	(Argentina) Hugo Pablo Centurión	Deportivo Pasto	6
4	(Colombia) Luis Carlos Arias	Independiente Medellín	5
4	(Colombia) Ayron del Valle	Independiente Medellín	5
4	(Colombia) Víctor Guazá Lucumí	Atlético Huila	5
4	(Colombia) Giovanni Moreno	Atlético Nacional	5
4	(Argentina) Daniel Néculman	Santa Fe	5
4	(Brazil) Fernando Oliveira	La Equidad	5

== See also ==
- Copa Colombia
- DIMAYOR
