= Jonathan Torres =

Jonathan Torres may refer to:

- Jonathan Torres (footballer, born 1977), Spanish forward for UD Lanzarote
- Jonathan Torres (footballer, born 1983), Argentine forward for Club Atlético Colegiales (Argentina)
- Jonathan Torres (footballer, born 1989), Colombian defender for Deportivo Cali
- Jonathan Torres (footballer, born 1996), Argentine forward for Club Almagro
- Jonathan Torres (grappler), Puerto Rican American Brazilian jiu-jitsu practitioner
