= Hernán Burbano =

Colombian footballer (born 1988)

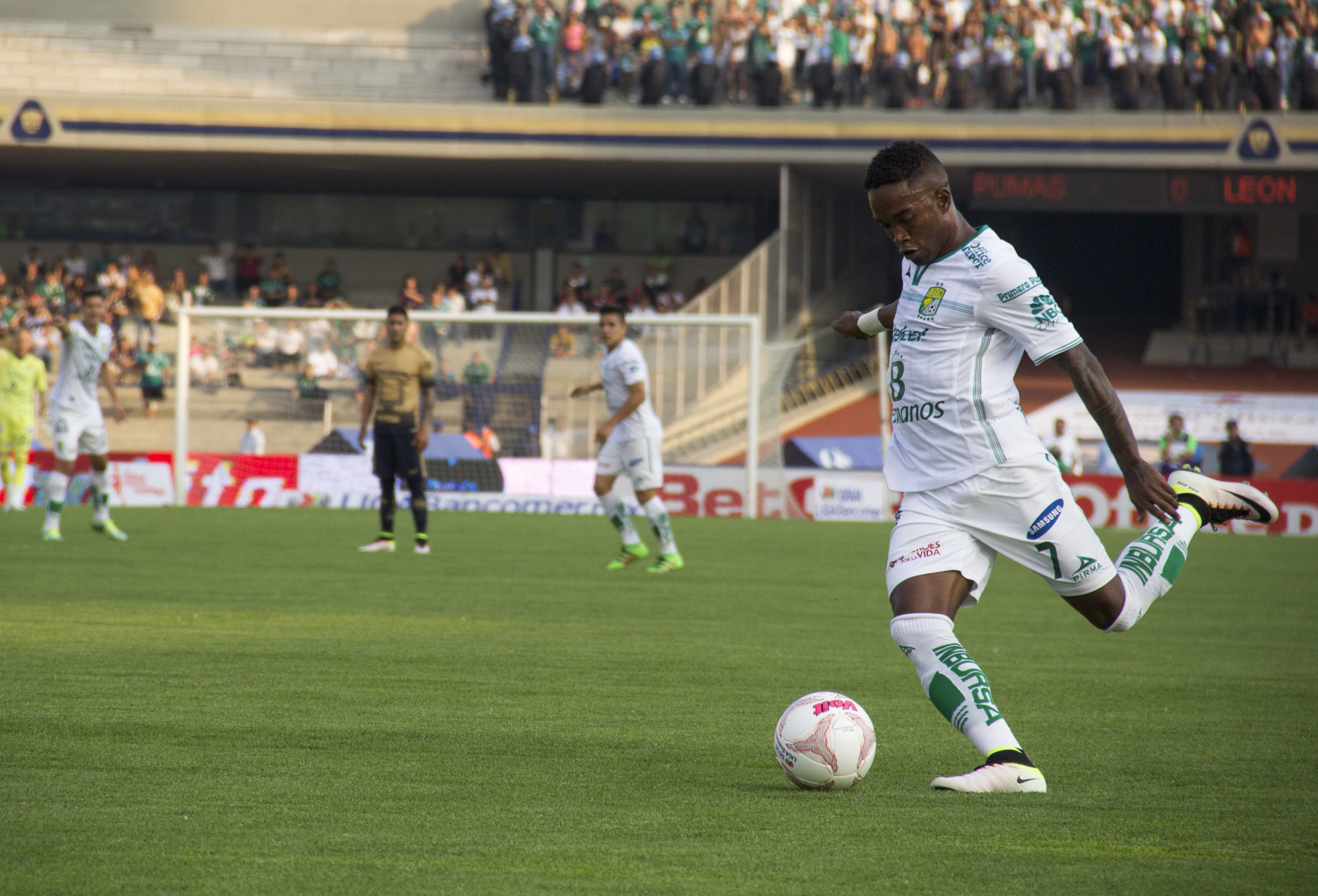
- Burbano playing for Club León

Personal information
- Full name: Hernán Darío Burbano
- Date of birth: 5 March 1988 (age 38)
- Place of birth: Santander de Quilichao, Colombia
- Height: 1.69 m (5 ft 7 in)
- Positions: Winger; attacking midfielder

Senior career*
Years	Team	Apps	(Gls)
2007–2008	Córdoba		
2009	Atlético La Sabana		(0)
2010	Deportivo Pasto	9	(5)
2011	Deportivo Cali	27	(2)
2012–2013	Club León	75	(13)
2014–2015	Tigres UANL	41	(4)
2015–2018	Club León	73	(4)
2018	Independiente Santa Fe	6	(0)
2019	Club Atlas	12	(0)
2019	Aldosivi	3	(0)
2020	Cúcuta Deportivo	4	(0)
- * Club domestic league appearances and goals

Hernán Darío Burbano (born 5 March 1988), popularly known by his nickname Piri, is a Colombian professional footballer who plays for Cúcuta Deportivo. He is a naturalized citizen of Mexico.

Mainly a winger, he can also operate as an attacking midfielder or second striker. His key attributes are his speed, passing and dribbling.

== Career ==
Burbano is a product of the Deportivo Cali youth system, and made his senior debut with Córdoba F.C. In 2008, he was scouted while he played for a local amateur football team called Deportivo Pasto, prior to joining Cali's senior side in 2011. However, he was loaned to Cordoba Futbol Club that at the time played in Colombia's Primera B. Which soon after changed to Atletico de la Sabana, in which he continued to play. The attacking midfielder signed for Mexican side Club León in December 2011. He was one of the key players in the promotion of Club Leon back to the First Division, and a key to the Apertura 2013 championship.

=== Tigres UANL ===
In December 2013, he was transferred to Tigres UANL. On December 14, 2014, Burbano received red card just seconds after replacing teammate José Francisco Torres as a substitute in the Liga MX final. Two of his other teammates, Damian Alvarez and Nahuel Guzman also received a red card in the Liga MX final against Club America. Burbano and his club lost 3–0 against Club América.

== Honours ==
León

- Ascenso MX: Clausura 2012
- Liga MX: Apertura 2013

Tigres UANL

- Copa MX: Clausura 2014
