= Andrés Felipe Correa =

Colombian footballer (born 1984)

Personal information
- Full name: Andrés Felipe Correa Osorio
- Date of birth: 2 July 1984 (age 42)
- Place of birth: Itagüí, Colombia
- Height: 1.83 m (6 ft 0 in)
- Position: Defender

Team information
- Current team: Union Magdalena
- Number: 6

Senior career*
Years	Team	Apps	(Gls)
2011–2013	Itagüí	130	(14)
2014–2017	Atlético Junior	140	(5)
2017–2018	Atlético Huila	41	(4)
2018–2020	Once Caldas	83	(3)
2021	Atlético Bucaramanga	32	(1)
2022	Deportivo Pereira	40	(0)
2023–	Once Caldas	20	(2)
2024-	Union Magdalena		
- * Club domestic league appearances and goals

Andrés Felipe Correa (born 2 July 1984) is a Colombian professional footballer who plays as a defender for Union Magdalena.

== Career ==
From the mid-1990s to the mid-2000s, he was part of the minor divisions of Atlético Nacional until he decided to hang up his boots when he realized that he would not have many opportunities to debut as a professional player.

=== Rionegro Águilas ===
Nearing his 26th birthday, his friend Fabio Restrepo, who was a prop man for the current Itagüí Ditaires, Rionegro Águilas, convinced him to return to professional activity knowing his qualities and he negotiated with the club's directives to make it possible. He arrives to carry out the tests in the preseason of January 2010 and is selected by the DT signing with the club.

== Honours ==
Águilas Doradas

- Categoría Primera B (1): 2010

Junior de Barranquilla

- Copa Colombia (1) : 2015

Deportivo Pereira

- Categoría Primera A (1) : 2022-II
