= Águilas Doradas (futsal) =

- Full name: Águilas Doradas
- Nickname(s): Las Águilas Doradas (The Golden Eagles)
- Founded: 7 January 2011
- Ground: Coliseo del Cielo; Rionegro, Colombia
- Capacity: 5,000
- Owner: Talento Dorado S.A.
- Chairman: Fernando Salazar
- Manager: Henry Gómez
- League: Liga Colombiana de Fútbol Sala
Home colours	Away colours

Águilas Doradas is a Colombian futsal team based in Rionegro, Colombia that plays in the Liga Colombiana de Fútbol Sala. The club was founded in January 2011 in Itagüí by the football team Itagüí F.C. and was known as the "Golden Eagles of Itagüí". In 2013, the club was renamed as Talento Dorado, however since 2014 the club have its current name. Águilas Doradas plays in the Coliseo del Cielo. The team had very good results in its first season reaching quarter-finals. In 2012 they became champions of the league.

== Uniform and team badge ==
The uniform shirt is gold holder, stockings and black pants. The alternate uniform is completely white. The team badge is gold and black colors.

== Honours ==
- Liga Colombiana de Fútbol Sala
  - Winners (2): 2012–I, 2013–1
- Copa Merconorte Futsal
  - Winners (1): 2013
- Copa Libertadores de Futsal
  - Runners-up (1): 2013

== Managers ==
- (Colombia) Jaime Cuervo (January 2011 – December 2012)
- (Colombia) David Sánchez (January 2013 – December 2014)
- (Colombia) Henry Gómez (January 2015 – present)

== See also ==
- Rionegro Águilas
