= David Montoya =

David Montoya may refer to:

- David Montoya (footballer, born 1978), Colombian football manager and former midfielder
- David Montoya (footballer, born 1995), Colombian football centre-back
