= Diego Álvarez (footballer) =

Colombian footballer (born 1981)

Personal information
- Full name: Diego Andrés Álvarez Sánchez
- Date of birth: 23 September 1981 (age 45)
- Place of birth: Medellín, Colombia
- Height: 1.73 m (5 ft 8 in)
- Position: Forward

Senior career*
Years	Team	Apps	(Gls)
2000–2008	Independiente Medellín	162	(69)
2009	San Luis	7	(0)
2010–2011	Deportivo Cali	59	(17)
2012–2013	Atlético Nacional	38	(4)
2013	→ Atlético Junior (loan)	8	(0)
2013–2014	→ Envigado (loan)	43	(4)
2014	Rionegro Águilas	19	(3)
2015	Real Cartagena	2	(0)
2015–2016	Patriotas	57	(18)
2017	La Equidad	25	(4)
2018	Patriotas Boyacá	30	(4)
2019–2020	Deportivo Pereira	57	(18)
- * Club domestic league appearances and goals as of 20:27, 18 January 2021 (UTC)

Diego Andrés Álvarez Sánchez (Note: In this Spanish name, the first or paternal surname is Álvarez and the second or maternal family name is Sánchez.) (born 23 September 1981), known as Diego Álvarez, is a retired Colombian footballer.

== Club career ==
Álvarez began his career with Independiente Medellín in 2000. He played for San Luis F.C. of Mexico between 2008 and 2009. In 2010, he returned to Colombia to play for Deportivo Cali. He moved to Atlético Nacional in January 2012 and to Atlético Junior in January 2013.

== Honours ==
Club

Deportivo Cali

- Copa Colombia (1):2010

Atlético Nacional

- Copa Colombia (1):2012

Deportivo Pereira

- Categoría Primera B (1):2019

Individual

2006 Categoría Primera A Torneo Finalización top scorer (11 goals)
