= Kevin Aladesanmi =

Swedish-Colombian footballer (born 1998)

Personal information
- Full name: Kevin Ademola Aladesanmi Sanchez
- Date of birth: 12 November 1998 (age 28)
- Place of birth: Jönköping, Sweden
- Height: 1.82 m (6 ft 0 in)
- Position: Midfielder

Team information
- Current team: Diamond Harbour

Youth career
- 2007–2013: Academia Tolimense
- 2013–2017: Parma de Barranquilla

Senior career*
Years	Team	Apps	(Gls)
2017	Parma de Barranquilla		
2017	→ Olhanense (loan)	7	(0)
2017	Barranquilla	14	(2)
2018–2022	Atlético Junior	4	(0)
2019	→ Leones (loan)	36	(13)
2020	→ Atlético Bucaramanga (loan)	7	(0)
2021	→ Patriotas (loan)	29	(2)
2022–2025	Fortaleza	43	(13)
2023	→ Pereira (loan)	18	(3)
2023–2024	→ Táchira (loan)	12	(1)
2025	Universitario de Vinto	5	(1)
2025	Guastatoya	2	(0)
2026	Quindío	0	(0)
2026–	Diamond Harbour	4	(2)
- * Club domestic league appearances and goals as of 16:26, 21 June 2026 (UTC)

Kevin Ademola Aladesanmi Sanchez (born 12 November 1998) is a professional footballer who plays as a midfielder for Indian Football League club Diamond Harbour. Born in Sweden to a Nigerian father and Colombian mother, he holds Colombian nationality.

== Career ==
Aladesanmi had a spell in the system of Academia Tolimense, prior to later joining Parma de Barranquilla. In 2017, Aladesanmi joined LigaPro side Olhanense on loan. He made his professional debut against Sporting B on 2 April 2017, being substituted on for Federico Virga during a 5–1 loss. He featured six more times as Olhanense were relegated from the 2016–17 LigaPro. Aladesanmi subsequently agreed to join Colombia's Barranquilla of Categoría Primera B. Four goals in fifteen matches followed, with the midfielder scoring twice in his final appearance versus Cúcuta Deportivo in the play-offs on 12 November.

Categoría Primera A side Atlético Junior signed Aladesanmi at the beginning of the 2018 campaign. After featuring five times that year, Aladesanmi was loaned out in January 2019 to second tier team Leones. For the 2020 season, he was loaned out to Atlético Bucaramanga.

== Personal life ==
Aladesanmi was born in Sweden to a Nigerian father and a Colombian mother; his father, Felix Ademola, was playing football for Deportes Tolima when they met. Aladesanmi's birthplace of Jönköping was where his parents were holidaying at the time. He spent the first years of his life growing up in Norway, while Ademola was playing for Skeid and Haugesund. During which time his parents separated, with Aladesanmi joining his mother in Ibagué, Colombia.

== Career statistics ==
As of 21 September 2019

Appearances and goals by club, season and competition
Club	Season	League			National cup		League cup		Continental		Other		Total	
Club	Season	Division	Apps	Goals	Apps	Goals	Apps	Goals	Apps	Goals	Apps	Goals	Apps	Goals
Olhanense (loan)	2016–17	LigaPro	7	0	0	0	0	0	—		0	0	7	0
Barranquilla	2017	Categoría Primera B	14	2	0	0	—		—		1 (Note: Appearance(s) in the Categoría Primera B play-offs)	2	15	4
Atlético Junior	2018	Categoría Primera A	4	0	1	0	—		0	0	0	0	5	0
Atlético Junior	2019	Categoría Primera A	0	0	0	0	—		0	0	0	0	0	0
Atlético Junior	Total		25	2	1	0	0	0	0	0	1	2	27	4
Leones (loan)	2019	Categoría Primera B	25	10	1	0	—		—		6	1	32	11
Career total			50	12	2	0	0	0	0	0	7	3	59	15
