= Felix Ademola =

Nigerian footballer

Personal information
- Full name: Felix Aladesanmi Ademola
- Date of birth: 9 September 1974 (age 52)
- Place of birth: Nigeria
- Height: 1.78 m (5 ft 10 in)
- Position: Midfielder

Senior career*
Years	Team	Apps	(Gls)
1993–1994	Stationery Stores		
1994	Lens		
1994–1995	Liège	5	(2)
1996	Deportes Tolima	4	(0)
1997	Haugesund	7	(0)
1997	→ Skeid (loan)	8	(1)
1998–1999	Husqvarna	29	(8)
2000–2005	Ham-Kam	124	(23)
2005–2006	Hønefoss	31	(4)
2007–2008	Vard Haugesund	0	(0)
2008–2011	Manglerud Star	35	(3)
2009	→ Årvoll (loan)	6	(0)

International career
2001	Nigeria	1	(0)
- * Club domestic league appearances and goals

Felix Ademola Aladesanmi (born 9 September 1974) is a Nigerian former professional football who played as a midfielder.

== Career ==
Ademola played for Stationery Stores F.C., France-based club Lens, Belgian RFC Liège, Colombian team Deportes Tolima, then Skeid Fotball and FK Haugesund and Swedish side Husqvarna FF. He returned to Norway and played for Hamarkameratene, Hønefoss BK, Vard Haugesund and Manglerud Star in Norway. In the second half of 2009 he was loaned out to Årvoll IL.

When Ademola first came to Norway, he signed for FK Haugesund. However, FK Haugesund signed another Nigerian forward around the same time, Bala Garba. According to the rules, only one non-EEC national could be fielded during any time. After a period where Haugesund decided which Nigerian player to use, the club landed on Bala Garba and decided to offload Ademola. Fredrikstad FK inquired about his availability, and Ademola was then on a short trial with Lillestrøm SK, but was ultimately signed by Skeid on loan.

In Hamarkameratene he was known as a technical player with flair.

== Personal life ==
Ademola's son, Kevin Aladesanmi, is a professional footballer.

According to reports in Norwegian media, Ademola's father and grandfathers were village rulers in Ondo State. Ademola himself grew up in Lagos.
