= Jairo Molina =

Colombian footballer (born 1993)

Personal information
- Full name: Jairo Gabriel Molina Ospino
- Date of birth: April 28, 1993 (age 33)
- Place of birth: Atlántico, Colombia
- Height: 1.81 m (5 ft 11 in)
- Position: Forward

Team information
- Current team: Boyacá Chicó
- Number: 9

Senior career*
| Years | Team | Apps | (Gls) |
| 2012–2014 | Envigado | 8 | (0) |
| 2015–2016 | Bogotá | 43 | (28) |
| 2017 | Deportes Tolima | 1 | (0) |
| 2017 | Dorados de Sinaloa | 4 | (0) |
| 2018 | Deportivo Pasto | 11 | (0) |
| 2019–2020 | Deportivo Pereira | 63 | (22) |
| 2021 | Alianza Petrolera | 32 | (2) |
| 2022 | Bogotá | 4 | (1) |
| 2023 | Atlético Huila | 8 | (0) |
| 2023 | Jaguares de Córdoba | 13 | (1) |
| 2023–2024 | FAS | 14 | (2) |
| 2024 | Orsomarso | 7 | (1) |
| 2025– | Boyacá Chicó | 37 | (14) |
- * Club domestic league appearances and goals as of 12 December 2025

Jairo Gabriel Molina Ospino (born April 28, 1993) is a Colombian footballer who plays for Boyacá Chicó as a forward.

== Honours ==
- Categoría Primera B: 2019
