= Diego Causado =

Colombian footballer (born 1989)

Personal information
- Full name: Diego Armando Causado Rivero
- Date of birth: 17 June 1989 (age 37)
- Place of birth: Ovejas, Sucre, Colombia
- Height: 1.72 m (5 ft 8 in)
- Position: Midfielder

Team information
- Current team: Atlético La Sabana

Youth career
- 2006–2007: Barranquilla FC
- 2007–2008: Atlético Junior

Senior career*
Years	Team	Apps	(Gls)
2008–2009	Atlético Junior	2	(0)
2009–2010	Atlético La Sabana	1	(1)
2010–2012	Boyacá Chicó	2	(0)
2012–	Sucre FC	6	(2)
- * Club domestic league appearances and goals

Diego Armando Causado Rivero (born 17 June 1989) is a Colombian footballer who plays for Sucre FC in the Categoría Primera B, as a midfielder.

== Club career ==
=== Sucre FC ===
On 1 April 2012, Diego featured in an away win to Depor FC in which he scored in the twenty-third minute.
