= 2008 Copa Colombia =

Copa Postobón 2008

Tournament details
- Country: Colombia
- Teams: 36

Final positions
- Champions: La Equidad (1st title)
- Runners-up: Once Caldas

Tournament statistics
- Matches played: 204
- Goals scored: 476 (2.33 per match)
- Top goal scorer(s): Dorlan Pabón; Wilson Mena (8 goals each)

The 2008 Copa Colombia, officially the 2008 Copa Postobón for sponsorship reasons, was the sixth edition of the Copa Colombia, the football tournament for professional clubs in Colombia. This edition marked the return of the tournament after a 19-year absence. It began on March 12 and ended on November 19.

Bogotá club La Equidad beat Manizales club Once Caldas in the finals for their first Copa Colombia title.

== Format ==
The competition is divided into 5 stages. The first stage is a group stage. The groups will be comprised by teams from the same regions, six teams per group. The top-two teams from each group will advance to the a second stage. The second stage will comprise six matches, each contested by two teams. The six winners advance to the third stage, which is identical to the second stage. The three winners and the best second place team advance to the semifinals. The winner of the semifinals advance to the finals. The winner of the Copa Colombia will earn a berth in the 2009 Copa Sudamericana.

== Phase I ==
This is the system of groups approved for the making of the tournament.

Teams advanced to Phase II

=== Group A ===
Teams from Caribbean region.

Team	Pld	W	D	L	GF	GA	GD	Pts
Junior	10	6	2	2	15	8	+7	20
Unión Magdalena	10	6	1	3	13	7	+6	19
Barranquilla	10	6	1	3	10	6	+4	19
Córdoba	10	4	0	6	9	12	-3	12
Real Cartagena	10	4	0	6	6	9	-3	12
Valledupar	10	2	0	8	5	16	-11	6

March 12, 2008
Valledupar	1–2	Atlético Junior	Estadio Armando Maestre Pavajeau	Valledupar
Barranquilla	2–1	Unión Magdalena	Estadio Romelio Martínez	Barranquilla
Córdoba	1–0	Real Cartagena	Estadio Alberto Saibis Saker	Cereté
March 26, 2008
Atlético Junior	1–0	Barranquilla	Estadio Metropolitano	Barranquilla
Real Cartagena	2–0	Valledupar	Estadio Jaime Morón León	Cartagena
Unión Magdalena	2–0	Córdoba	Estadio Eduardo Santos	Santa Marta
April 9, 2008
Unión Magdalena	1–1	Atlético Junior	Estadio Eduardo Santos	Santa Marta
Barranquilla	1–0	Real Cartagena	Estadio Romelio Martínez	Barranquilla
Córdoba	0–2	Valledupar	Estadio Alberto Saibis Saker	Cereté
April 30, 2008
Córdoba	1–0	Atlético Junior	Estadio Alberto Saibis Saker	Cereté
Real Cartagena	1–0	Unión Magdalena	Estadio Jaime Morón León	Cartagena
Valledupar	0–1	Barranquilla	Estadio Armando Maestre Pavajeau	Valledupar
May 7, 2008
Atlético Junior	2–1	Real Cartagena	Estadio Metropolitano	Barranquilla
Barranquilla	1–0	Córdoba	Estadio Romelio Martínez	Barranquilla
Unión Magdalena	2–0	Valledupar	Estadio Eduardo Santos	Santa Marta
May 28, 2008
Atlético Junior	4–0	Valledupar	Estadio Metropolitano	Barranquilla
Real Cartagena	0–3	Córdoba	Estadio Jaime Morón León	Cartagena
Unión Magdalena	2–0	Barranquilla	Estadio Eduardo Santos	Santa Marta
June 4, 2008
Barranquilla	0–0	Atlético Junior	Estadio Romelio Martínez	Barranquilla
Córdoba	2–1	Unión Magdalena	Estadio Alberto Saibis Saker	Cereté
Valledupar	0–1	Real Cartagena	Estadio Armando Maestre Pavajeau	Valledupar
July 30, 2008
Atlético Junior	1–2	Unión Magdalena	Estadio Metropolitano	Barranquilla
Real Cartagena	1–0	Barranquilla	Estadio Jaime Morón León	Cartagena
Valledupar	1–0	Córdoba	Estadio Armando Maestre Pavajeau	Valledupar
August 6, 2008
Atlético Junior	3–2	Córdoba	Estadio Metropolitano	Barranquilla
Barranquilla	3–1	Valledupar	Estadio Metropolitano	Barranquilla
Unión Magdalena	1–0	Real Cartagena	Estadio Eduardo Santos	Santa Marta
August 13, 2008
Córdoba	0–2	Barranquilla	Estadio Alberto Saibis Saker	Cereté
Real Cartagena	0–1	Atlético Junior	Estadio Jaime Morón León	Cartagena
Valledupar	0–1	Unión Magdalena	Estadio Armando Maestre Pavajeau	Valledupar

=== Group B ===
Teams from Antioquia and Risaralda.

Team	Pld	W	D	L	GF	GA	GD	Pts
Atlético Nacional	10	6	3	1	12	5	+7	21
Envigado	10	4	3	3	17	8	+9	15
Independiente Medellín	10	4	3	3	12	12	0	15
Deportivo Pereira	10	2	5	3	11	9	+2	11
Deportivo Rionegro	10	2	3	4	8	16	-8	9
Itagüí Ditaires	10	2	3	5	8	18	-10	9

March 12, 2008
Deportivo Rionegro	1–3	Envigado	Estadio Alberto Grisales	Rionegro
Atlético Nacional	2–0	Pereira	Estadio Atanasio Girardot	Medellín
Bajo Cauca	2–2	Medellín	Estadio Municipal Orlando Anibal Monroy	Caucasia
March 26, 2008
Pereira	1–1	Bajo Cauca	Estadio Hernán Ramírez Villegas	Pereira
Envigado	1–2	Atlético Nacional	Estadio Polideportivo Sur	Envigado
Medellín	0–2	Deportivo Rionegro	Estadio Atanasio Girardot	Medellín
April 9, 2008
Bajo Cauca	2–0	Deportivo Rionegro	Estadio Municipal Orlando Anibal Monroy	Caucasia
Atlético Nacional	3–1	Medellín	Estadio Atanasio Girardot	Medellín
Pereira	0–1	Envigado	Estadio Hernán Ramírez Villegas	Pereira
April 30, 2008
Bajo Cauca	0–0	Envigado	Estadio Municipal Orlando Anibal Monroy	Caucasia
Deportivo Rionegro	0–0	Atlético Nacional	Estadio Alberto Grisales	Rionegro
Medellín	1–1	Pereira	Estadio Atanasio Girardot	Medellín
May 7, 2008
Envigado	0–0	Medellín	Estadio Municipal Orlando Anibal Monroy	Envigado
Pereira	4–0	Deportivo Rionegro	Estadio Hernán Ramírez Villegas	Pereira
Atlético Nacional	1–0	Bajo Cauca	Estadio Atanasio Girardot	Medellín
May 28, 2008
Pereira	0–0	Atlético Nacional	Estadio Hernán Ramírez Villegas	Pereira
Envigado	3–1	Deportivo Rionegro	Estadio Alberto Grisales	Envigado
Medellín	3–0	Bajo Cauca	Estadio Atanasio Girardot	Medellín
June 4, 2008
Deportivo Rionegro	1–2	Medellín	Estadio Alberto Grisales	Rionegro
Atlético Nacional	1–0	Envigado	Estadio Atanasio Girardot	Medellín
Bajo Cauca	1–0	Pereira	Estadio Municipal Orlando Anibal Monroy	Caucasia
July 30, 2008
Deportivo Rionegro	1–0	Itagüí	Estadio Alberto Grisales	Rionegro
Envigado	1–1	Pereira	Estadio Polideportivo Sur	Envigado
Medellín	1–0	Atlético Nacional	Estadio Atanasio Girardot	Medellín
August 6, 2008
Atlético Nacional	0–0	Deportivo Rionegro	Estadio Atanasio Girardot	Medellín
Pereira	2–0	Medellín	Estadio Hernán Ramírez Villegas	Pereira
Envigado	7–0	Itagüí	Estadio Polideportivo Sur	Envigado
August 13, 2008
Itagüí	2–3	Atlético Nacional	Estadio Metropolitano Ciudad de Itagüí	Itagüí
Deportivo Rionegro	2–2	Pereira	Estadio Alberto Grisales	Rionegro
Medellín	2–1	Envigado	Estadio Atanasio Girardot	Medellín

=== Group C ===
Teams from the northeastern part of Colombia.

Team	Pld	W	D	L	GF	GA	GD	Pts
Boyacá Chicó	10	6	2	2	21	9	+12	20
Cúcuta Deportivo	10	5	2	3	13	10	+3	17
Real Santander	10	5	2	3	14	15	-1	17
Atlético Bucaramanga	10	4	3	3	15	8	+7	15
Alianza Petrolera	10	3	2	5	10	14	-4	11
Patriotas	10	0	3	7	6	23	-17	3

	APE	BOY	BUC	CUC	PAT	RSA
Alianza Petrolera		0 - 0	0 - 0	2 - 0	3 - 1	0 - 2
Boyacá Chicó	3 - 0		0 - 0	3 - 0	2 - 1	8 - 1
Atl. Bucaramanga	2 - 1	0 - 2		0 - 1	7 - 0	2 - 0
Cúcuta Deportivo	2 - 0	3 - 0	0 - 2		3 - 0	1 - 1
Patriotas FC	1 - 2	0 - 1	1 - 1	1 - 1		0 - 2
Real Santander	1 - 0	2 - 0	3 - 1	1 - 2	1 - 1	

=== Group D ===
Teams from Bogotá and Villavicencio.

Team	Pld	W	D	L	GF	GA	GD	Pts
La Equidad	10	5	5	0	14	8	+6	20
Centauros	10	5	1	4	15	14	+1	16
Santa Fe	10	4	4	2	9	8	+1	16
Academia	10	3	4	3	8	8	0	13
Millonarios	10	3	3	4	10	8	+2	12
Bogotá	10	0	3	7	3	13	-10	3

	ACA	MIL	CEN	EQU	SAN	BOG
Academia		1 - 0	2 - 0	1 - 2	1 - 1	2 - 1
Millonarios	0 - 0		3 - 0	2 - 2	2 - 0	2 - 0
Centauros	2 - 0	2 - 0		1 - 2	3 - 0	3 - 1
La Equidad	0 - 0	2 - 1	2 - 2		0 - 0	1 - 0
Santa Fe	2 - 1	1 - 0	3 - 0	1 - 1		1 - 0
Bogotá	0 - 0	0 - 0	1 - 2	0 - 2	0 - 0	

=== Group E ===
Teams from Pacific Region of Colombia.

Team	Pld	W	D	L	GF	GA	GD	Pts
Deportivo Cali	10	6	2	2	18	6	+12	20
Depor	10	6	0	4	11	10	+1	18
Deportivo Pasto	10	5	3	2	11	11	0	18
Deportes Quindío	10	5	2	3	10	8	+2	17
Cortuluá	10	2	2	6	7	15	-8	8
América	10	1	1	8	6	13	-7	4

	QUI	COR	CAL	PAS	DEP	AME
Deportes Quindío		1 - 0	3 - 2	1 - 1	1 - 0	1 - 0
Cortuluá	0 - 3		1 - 1	1 - 1	1 - 2	1 - 2
Deportivo Cali	2 - 0	3 - 0		4 - 0	3 - 0	1 - 0
Deportivo Pasto	1 - 0	1 - 0	0 - 0		2 - 0	2 - 1
Depor	2 - 0	1 - 2	2 - 1	2 - 0		1 - 0
América	0 - 0	1 - 2	0 - 1	2 - 3	0 - 1	

=== Grupo F ===
Teams from Central-Western part of the country .

Team	Pld	W	D	L	GF	GA	GD	Pts
Once Caldas	10	5	5	0	22	9	+13	20
Expreso Rojo	10	5	5	0	10	4	+6	20
Deportes Tolima	10	5	2	3	19	12	+7	17
Atlético Huila	10	2	5	3	13	13	0	11
Girardot	10	1	3	6	8	26	-18	6
Juventud Soacha	10	1	2	7	8	16	-8	5

	EXR	CAL	SOA	GFC	TOL	HUI
Expreso Rojo		0 - 0	2 - 1	1 - 0	1 - 0	0 - 0
Once Caldas	1 - 1		2 - 0	5 - 0	1 - 0	5 - 4
Juventud Soacha	0 - 1	2 - 2		1 - 1	0 - 0	0 - 1
Girardot	1 - 1	1 - 5	0 - 2		2 - 6	1 - 1
Deportes Tolima	0 - 2	1 - 1	3 - 1	3 - 0		2 - 2
Atlético Huila	1 - 1	0 - 0	2 - 0	1 - 2	1 - 2	

== Phase II ==
Phase II began on August 27 and ended on September 3.

Team #1	Points earned	Team #2	1st leg	2nd leg
Envigado	3–3 (6–5 p)	Junior	1–0	2–3
Unión Magdalena	1–4	Atlético Nacional	2–2	0–4
Centauros	3–3 (gd)	Boyacá Chicó	1–0	1–6
Cúcuta Deportivo	1–4	La Equidad	0–0	0–2
Expreso Rojo	6–0	Deportivo Cali	2–1	1–0
Depor	3–3 (gd)	Once Caldas	1–0	4–7

== Phase III ==
Phase III began on September 17 and ended on October 1.

Team #1	Points earned	Team #2	1st leg	2nd leg
Envigado	3–3 (gd)	La Equidad	2–1	1–3
Expreso Rojo	(gd) 3–3	Atlético Nacional	2–0	0–1
Boyacá Chicó	1–4	Once Caldas	1–1	1–3

== Semifinals ==
The semifinals were played on October 29 and November 5

Team #1	Points earned	Team #2	1st leg	2nd leg
Expreso Rojo	1–4	Once Caldas	0–1	0–0
Envigado	1–4	La Equidad	0–0	1–4

== Finals ==
The Finals were played on November 12 and November 20.

Team #1	Points earned	Team #2	1st leg	2nd leg
Once Caldas	3–4	La Equidad	0–1	3–3

Copa Colombia
2008 Winners
La Equidad
First Title

== See also ==
- Copa Colombia
