= Jorge Aguirre (footballer, born 1987) =

Colombian footballer

Personal information
- Full name: Jorge Andrés Aguirre Restrepo
- Date of birth: 18 June 1987 (age 39)
- Place of birth: Medellín, Colombia
- Height: 1.69 m (5 ft 7 in)
- Positions: Midfielder; forward

Team information
- Current team: Envigado
- Number: 16

Senior career*
Years	Team	Apps	(Gls)
2004–2007	Envigado	20	(0)
2008	Leones	30	(4)
2009	Envigado	10	(2)
2009–2014	Rionegro Águilas	170	(53)
2014–2017	Atlético Junior	109	(19)
2018	Independiente Santa Fe	13	(0)
2019	Atlético Huila	13	(0)
2019	Atlético Bucaramanga	5	(0)
2020–	Envigado	7	(0)
- * Club domestic league appearances and goals as of 20:07, 12 May 2020 (UTC)

Jorge Aguirre (born 18 June 1987) is a Colombian footballer who plays as a forward for Categoría Primera A club Envigado.

== Honours ==
=== Club ===
Envigado

- Primera B (1): 2007

Leones

- Primera B (1): 2008

Rionegro Águilas

- Primera B (1): 2010

Junior

- Copa Colombia (2): 2015, 2017
