= Liga Colombiana de Futsal =

Liga Colombiana de Fútbol Sala
- Organising body: Colombian Football Federation
- Founded: 2011; 15 years ago
- Country: Colombia
- Confederation: CONMEBOL
- Number of clubs: 32
- Level on pyramid: Level 1
- International cup: Copa Libertadores de Futsal
- Current champions: Deportivo Lyon (2nd title) (2025)
- Most championships: Alianza Platanera; Real Bucaramanga; Real Antioquia; Club Deportivo Meta (3 titles each)
- Website: FCF.com.co

The Liga Colombiana de Fútbol Sala (English: Colombian Futsal League), known as Liga BetPlay Futsal FCF for sponsorship reasons, is the professional futsal league in Colombia. It was founded in 2011. Administered by the Colombian Football Federation, it is currently contested by 32 teams.
