= Jonathan Torres (footballer, born 1983) =

Argentine footballer

Personal information
- Full name: Jonathan Ezequiel Rodrigo Torres
- Date of birth: 11 May 1983 (age 43)
- Place of birth: San Isidro, Argentina
- Height: 1.80 m (5 ft 11 in)
- Position: Forward

Senior career*
Years	Team	Apps	(Gls)
2004	San Miguel	9	(0)
2004–2007	Colegiales	81	(29)
2007–2008	Comunicaciones	37	(7)
2008–2009	Colegiales		
2009	Deportivo Merlo	10	(0)
2010–2012	Colegiales		
2012–2013	Acassuso	24	(0)
2014–2015	Excursionistas	27	(2)
2015	→ JJ Urquiza (loan)		
2016–2017	JJ Urquiza		
2017–2018	Sportivo Barracas	22	(1)
- * Club domestic league appearances and goals

Jonathan Ezequiel Rodrigo Torres (born 11 May 1983) is a retired Argentine footballer who played as a forward.

== Career ==
Torres' career began in 2004 with San Miguel in Primera C Metropolitana, with the forward making nine appearances for the club. Later that year, Torres was signed by Colegiales. Twenty-nine goals in eighty-one matches followed, which preceded a stint with Comunicaciones of Primera B Metropolitana during 2007–08; a season which his parent club ended with promotion. He returned to Colegiales in 2008, before departing for a second time to sign for Primera B Nacional side Deportivo Merlo. His first appearance arrived on 22 August 2009 against Aldosivi, as he featured for the full ninety minutes of a 2–0 loss.

After being selected ten times by Deportivo Merlo, Torres left for a third spell with Colegiales. This spell with the club lasted two years, as Torres agreed to join Acassuso in 2012; overall, Torres scored fifteen goals in one hundred and fifteen appearances for Colegiales in his two latter spells in Primera B Metropolitana. Torres' period with Acassuso was followed with a seventeen-month stint with Excursionistas, which culminated with a loan spell out with Justo José de Urquiza. Six months into his loan with Justo José de Urquiza, the forward was signed permanently by the Primera C Metropolitana club for 2016.

On 30 June 2017, Torres joined fellow fourth tier team Sportivo Barracas. He left a year later after scoring once in twenty-two matches.

== Career statistics ==
As of 17 November 2018.

Club statistics
Club	Season	League			Cup (Note: Includes the Copa Argentina)		League Cup		Continental		Other		Total	
Club	Season	Division	Apps	Goals	Apps	Goals	Apps	Goals	Apps	Goals	Apps	Goals	Apps	Goals
San Miguel	2003–04	Primera C Metropolitana	9	0	0	0	—		—		0	0	9	0
Comunicaciones	2007–08	Primera B Metropolitana	37	7	0	0	—		—		0	0	37	7
Deportivo Merlo	2009–10	Primera B Nacional	10	0	0	0	—		—		0	0	10	0
Acassuso	2012–13	Primera B Metropolitana	24	0	0	0	—		—		0	0	24	0
Sportivo Barracas	2017–18	Primera C Metropolitana	22	1	0	0	—		—		0	0	22	1
Career total			102	8	0	0	—		—		0	0	102	8
