= Federico Virga =

Italian footballer

Personal information
- Date of birth: 28 October 1993 (age 33)
- Place of birth: Italy
- Height: 1.74 m (5 ft 9 in)
- Position: Midfielder

Team information
- Current team: Imperia

Senior career*
Years	Team	Apps	(Gls)
2011–2012	Imperia	34	(1)
2012–2013	Santhià	30	(0)
2013–2015	Folgore Caratese	49	(1)
2015–2017	Olhanense	53	(0)
2018	Savio Rocchetta		
2018–2019	Viareggio 2014	29	(1)
2019–	Imperia		
- * Club domestic league appearances and goals as of 23:46, 12 November 2019 (UTC)

Federico Virga (born 28 October 1993) is an Italian football player who currently plays for A.S.D. Imperia.

== Club career ==
He made his professional debut in the Segunda Liga for Olhanense on 7 August 2015 in a game against Benfica B.

In the summer 2019, Virga returned to A.S.D. Imperia.
