= 2010 Categoría Primera B season =

Torneo Postobón
- Season: 2010
- Champions: Itagüí Ditaires
- Promoted: Itagüí Ditaires
- Top goalscorer: Alvaro Barrios (21 goals)
- Biggest home win: Real Santander 7-0 Valledupar
- Biggest away win: Academia 1-5 Itagüí Ditaires; Juventud Girardot 0-4 Valledupar
- Highest scoring: Real Santander 7-0 Valledupar Itagüí Ditaires 6-1 Juventud Girardot Alianza Petrolera 6-1 Dépor

The 2010 Categoría Primera B season is the 21st season since its founding and is officially called the 2010 Torneo Postobón for sponsorship reasons.

== Teams ==
Team	City	Stadium	Capacity
Academia F.C.	Bogotá	Estadio Compensar	4,500
Alianza Petrolera	Barrancabermeja	Estadio Daniel Villa Zapata	8,000
Atlético Bucaramanga	Bucaramanga	Estadio Alfonso López	28,000
Atlético La Sabana	Sincelejo	Estadio Arturo Cumplido Sierra	5,000
Barranquilla F.C.	Barranquilla	Estadio Romelio Martínez	20,000
Bogotá F.C.	Bogotá	Estadio Alfonso López Pumarejo	15,000
Centauros Villavicencio	Villavicencio	Estadio Manuel Calle Lombana	15,000
Depor F.C.	Cali	Estadio Olímpico Pascual Guerrero	45,195
Deportivo Pasto	Pasto	Estadio Departamental Libertad	27,380
Deportivo Rionegro	Rionegro	Estadio Alberto Grisales	9,000
Expreso Rojo	Zipaquirá	Estadio Municipal Los Zipas	2,000
Itagüí Ditaires	Itagüí	Estadio Metropolitano Ciudad de Itagüí	12,000
Juventud Girardot	Girardot	Estadio Luis Antonio Duque Peña	15,000
Pacífico F.C.	Buenaventura	Polideportivo El Cristal	2,000
Patriotas F.C.	Tunja	Estadio de La Independencia	20,000
Real Santander	Bucaramanga	Estadio Alfonso López	28,000
Unión Magdalena	Santa Marta	Estadio Eduardo Santos	23,000
Valledupar F.C.	Valledupar	Estadio Armando Maestre Pavajeau	10,000

== First stage ==
=== Standings ===
Pos	Team	Pld	W	D	L	GF	GA	GD	Pts	Qualification
1	Itagüí	36	21	8	7	61	33	+28	71	Advanced to the Cuadrangular Semifinals
2	Deportivo Pasto	36	21	5	10	45	30	+15	68	Advanced to the Cuadrangular Semifinals
3	Deportivo Rionegro	36	17	11	8	59	37	+22	62	Advanced to the Cuadrangular Semifinals
4	Patriotas	36	17	10	9	58	36	+22	61	Advanced to the Cuadrangular Semifinals
5	Unión Magdalena	36	18	5	13	46	38	+8	59	Advanced to the Cuadrangular Semifinals
6	Bogotá	36	15	10	11	48	30	+18	55	Advanced to the Cuadrangular Semifinals
7	Real Santander	36	13	14	9	50	41	+9	53	Advanced to the Cuadrangular Semifinals
8	Atlético Bucaramanga	36	14	11	11	44	40	+4	53	Advanced to the Cuadrangular Semifinals
9	Pacífico	36	11	14	11	39	36	+3	47	
10	Expreso Rojo	36	11	12	13	35	39	−4	45	
11	Atlético La Sabana	36	10	14	12	33	45	−12	44	
12	Centauros	36	10	13	13	45	51	−6	43	
13	Academia	36	13	4	19	43	54	−11	43	
14	Alianza Petrolera	36	8	13	15	36	51	−15	37	
15	Valledupar	36	9	10	17	31	51	−20	37	
16	Depor	36	9	8	19	45	58	−13	35	
17	Juventud Girardot	36	9	8	19	43	71	−28	35	
18	Barranquilla	36	7	12	17	24	45	−21	33	

Updated to match(es) played on October 24, 2010. Source: colombia.golgolgol.net
Rules for classification: 1) points; 2) goal difference; 3) number of goals scored.

=== Results ===
==== Regular matches ====
Home \ Away	ACA	AP	LSA	BAR	BOG	BUC	CEN	DEP	PAS	EXP	ITA	JUV	PAC	PAT	RSA	RIO	MAG	VAL
Academia		5–0	2–0	0–0	1–0	0–1	1–2	3–2	1–0	2–1	1–5	2–0	2–1	1–1	0–1	3–0	2–0	2–2
Alianza Petrolera	0–2		0–0	1–0	1–0	0–0	4–2	6–1	0–1	1–0	0–2	1–1	0–0	1–1	1–2	1–1	0–1	0–0
Atlético La Sabana	4–1	2–2		0–0	0–0	0–0	2–1	3–2	0–0	1–1	2–1	3–0	2–1	0–1	2–1	1–3	2–1	2–2
Barranquilla	3–0	1–1	0–0		1–2	0–0	1–1	1–0	2–0	0–2	0–2	4–0	0–0	1–1	2–1	1–1	0–1	0–0
Bogotá	3–0	1–0	3–0	6–0		1–0	1–1	3–0	2–1	0–0	0–0	1–2	0–1	1–1	2–1	2–1	1–0	3–0
Atlético Bucaramanga	0–0	3–1	2–0	2–0	0–1		2–1	2–2	0–1	3–1	2–4	3–2	2–1	0–2	3–3	2–1	0–0	2–1
Centauros	1–2	1–1	1–2	2–0	0–0	2–2		1–1	0–1	2–1	0–0	2–2	3–3	4–2	0–1	1–1	1–0	3–0
Depor	3–0	1–2	2–0	1–2	0–2	1–2	1–0		4–0	0–0	2–0	2–1	0–2	2–3	1–1	2–3	2–3	2–0
Deportivo Pasto	1–0	1–0	5–0	2–0	1–0	1–0	3–2	2–1		2–0	1–0	2–0	2–0	1–0	2–0	2–2	2–0	1–0
Expreso Rojo	1–0	0–0	0–0	1–1	1–0	0–0	0–0	3–1	2–0		1–1	1–0	3–1	1–1	2–1	1–2	1–0	3–2
Itagüí	1–0	1–0	1–0	2–0	2–1	2–0	2–0	4–2	1–3	2–0		6–1	3–2	2–1	2–2	2–2	2–1	1–0
Juventud Girardot	2–1	4–1	4–1	2–0	3–3	1–2	0–1	0–2	1–2	3–2	0–2		1–1	1–0	1–1	2–1	2–2	0–4
Pacífico	2–1	2–0	2–0	3–1	1–1	2–0	1–1	2–2	1–1	1–0	0–0	1–1		0–0	1–0	0–1	1–0	0–1
Patriotas	1–0	4–1	3–1	3–1	1–1	3–2	1–1	2–0	1–0	1–0	1–2	3–0	2–0		0–1	0–3	2–0	4–1
Real Santander	2–1	0–0	1–1	2–0	3–0	0–0	3–1	1–1	1–0	0–0	1–0	1–1	2–1	1–1		0–0	1–1	7–0
Deportivo Rionegro	3–0	3–1	0–0	0–1	1–1	2–1	1–0	0–0	3–0	3–0	1–1	3–1	3–2	1–1	3–0		1–2	2–0
Unión Magdalena	3–2	2–3	1–0	4–1	1–0	2–1	1–0	1–0	2–1	1–2	2–1	5–1	0–0	1–0	4–2	2–1		1–1
Valledupar	3–2	0–1	1–1	1–0	2–0	0–0	1–4	2–0	1–1	3–1	0–0	0–1	0–0	1–3	0–1	0–2	1–0	

Updated to match(es) played on October 24, 2010. Source: colombia.golgolgol.net
Legend: Blue = home team win; Yellow = draw; Red = away team win.

==== Regional derbies (Rounds 9 & 27) ====
Round 9 (Derbies) - April 10 and 11, 2010
Date	Time	Venue	Home	Score	Away
Sat.	14:30	Compensar	Academia	3 - 1	Bogotá F. C.
Sat.	15:30	Alfonso López	Bucaramanga	2 - 1	Juventud
Sat.	15:30	Metropolitano Roberto Meléndez	Barranquilla F. C.	0 - 0	Atlético de la Sabana
Sat.	15:30	Armando Maestre Pavajeau	Valledupar	0 - 1	Unión Magdalena
Sat.	15:30	Metropolitano Ciudad de Itagüí	Itagüi	0 - 1	Rionegro
Sat.	15:30	Manuel Calle Lombana	Centauros	1 - 0	Patriotas
Sun.	15:30	Daniel Villa Zapata	Alianza Petrolera	2 - 2	Real Santander
Sun.	15:30	Departamental Libertad	Deportivo Pasto	1 - 2	Depor F. C.
Sun.	15:30	Polideportivo El Cristal	Pacífico F. C.	1 - 1	Expreso Rojo

Round 27 (Derbies) - September 8, 2010
Date	Time	Venue	Home	Score	Away
Wed.	15:30	Alfonso López	Real Santander	3 - 2	Alianza Petrolera
Wed.	15:30	Municipal Los Zipas	Expreso Rojo	1 - 2	Pacífico F. C.
Wed.	15:30	Cacique Jamundí	Depor F. C.	0 - 0	Deportivo Pasto
Wed.	15:30	Alfonso López Pumarejo	Bogotá F. C.	4 - 0	Academia
Wed.	16:30	Luis Antonio Duque	Juventud	1 - 3	Bucaramanga
Wed.	19:30	Arturo Cumplido Sierra	Atlético de la Sabana	1 - 0	Barranquilla F. C.
Wed.	19:30	Eduardo Santos	Union Magdalena	0 - 1	Valledupar
Wed.	19:30	Alberto Grisales	Rionegro	3 - 4	Itagüi
Wed.	19:30	De La Independencia	Patriotas	5 - 0	Centauros

== Second stage ==
=== Cuagranguar Semifinals ===
==== Group A ====
Pos	Team	Pld	W	D	L	GF	GA	GD	Pts	Qualification
1	Itagüí	6	5	0	1	13	3	+10	15	Advanced to the Final
2	Unión Magdalena	6	3	1	2	7	7	0	10	
3	Real Santander	6	2	1	3	7	8	−1	7	
4	Deportivo Rionegro	6	1	0	5	3	11	−8	3	

Source: colombia.golgolgol.net
Rules for classification: 1) points; 2) goal difference; 3) number of goals scored.

==== Group B ====
Pos	Team	Pld	W	D	L	GF	GA	GD	Pts	Qualification
1	Deportivo Pasto	6	4	1	1	12	9	+3	13	Advanced to the Final
2	Bogotá	6	3	2	1	12	9	+3	11	
3	Patriotas	6	3	1	2	9	8	+1	10	
4	Atlético Bucaramanga	6	0	0	6	6	13	−7	0	

Source: colombia.golgolgol.net
Rules for classification: 1) points; 2) goal difference; 3) number of goals scored.

=== Final ===
Pos	Team	Pld	W	D	L	GF	GA	GD	Pts	Promotion or qualification
1	Itagüí (P)	2	1	1	0	3	2	+1	4	Promotion to the 2011 Primera Categoría A
2	Deportivo Pasto	2	0	1	1	2	3	−1	1	Relegation/promotion playoff

Source: colombia.golgolgol.net
Rules for classification: 1) points; 2) goal difference; 3) number of goals scored.
(P) Promoted
December 5, 2010
15:30 UTC−05:00

Deportivo Pasto	1–1	Itagüí Ditaires
Mera 73'		Páez 82'

Estadio Departamental Libertad, Pasto
Referee: Jorge Sierra

December 8, 2010
15:00 UTC−05:00

Itagüí Ditaires	2–1	Deportivo Pasto
Páez 72', 85'		Cabrera 60'

Estadio Metropolitano Ciudad de Itagüí, Itagüí
Referee: Luis Sánchez

Torneo Postobón
2010 champion
Itagüí Ditaires
1st title

== Aggregate table ==
Pos	Team	Pld	W	D	L	GF	GA	GD	Pts	Promotion or qualification
1	Itagüí (C, P)	44	27	9	8	77	38	+39	90	Promotion to the 2011 Primera Categoría A
2	Deportivo Pasto	44	25	7	12	59	42	+17	82	Relegation/promotion playoff
3	Patriotas	42	20	11	11	67	44	+23	71	
4	Unión Magdalena	42	21	6	15	53	45	+8	69	
5	Bogotá	42	18	12	12	60	39	+21	66	
6	Deportivo Rionegro	42	18	11	13	62	49	+13	65	
7	Real Santander	42	15	15	12	57	49	+8	60	
8	Atlético Bucaramanga	42	14	11	17	50	53	−3	53	
9	Pacífico	36	11	14	11	39	36	+3	47	
10	Expreso Rojo	36	11	12	13	35	39	−4	45	
11	Atlético La Sabana	36	10	14	12	33	45	−12	44	
12	Centauros	36	10	13	13	45	51	−6	43	
13	Academia	36	13	4	19	43	54	−11	43	
14	Alianza Petrolera	36	8	13	15	36	51	−15	37	
15	Valledupar	36	9	10	17	31	51	−20	37	
16	Depor	36	9	8	19	45	58	−13	35	
17	Juventud Girardot	36	9	8	19	43	71	−28	35	
18	Barranquilla	36	7	12	17	24	45	−21	33	

Updated to match(es) played on December 8, 2010. Source: colombia.golgolgol.net
Rules for classification: 1) points; 2) goal difference; 3) number of goals scored.
(C) Champions; (P) Promoted

== Relegation/promotion playoff ==
Teams			Scores		Tie-breakers		
Team #1	Points	Team #2	1st leg	2nd leg	GD	AG	Pen.
Envigado	6:0	Deportivo Pasto	1–0	2–0	—	—	—
