= Luis Páez (footballer, born 1986) =

Colombian footballer

Personal information
- Full name: Luis Alfonso Páez Restrepo
- Date of birth: 27 October 1986 (age 40)
- Place of birth: Medellín, Colombia
- Height: 1.83 m (6 ft 0 in)
- Position: Forward

Team information
- Current team: Toros Neza
- Number: 9

Senior career*
Years	Team	Apps	(Gls)
2007	Atlético Bello	3	(0)
2008	Millonarios	6	(0)
2009	Deportivo Rionegro	20	(6)
2010–2017	Rionegro Águilas	91	(45)
2011–2013	→ Junior (loan)	64	(37)
2013	→ Deportivo Pasto (loan)	9	(2)
2013	→ Atlético Huila (loan)	24	(13)
2014	→ Atlético Nacional (loan)	25	(9)
2015	→ Santa Fe (loan)	13	(8)
2017	NorthEast United FC	6	(0)
2018	Deportivo Táchira	7	(1)
2018–2019	Deportivo Iztapa	3	(1)
2019–2020	Boyacá Chicó	5	(0)
2021–	Toros Neza	0	(0)
- * Club domestic league appearances and goals as of 23:58, 14 May 2023 (UTC)

Luis Alfonso Páez (born October 27, 1986) is a Colombian footballer who plays as a forward for Toros Neza.

== Career ==
Paez began his career in the Categoría Primera B with Atlético Bello. A year later, he transferred to Millonarios, and the following year to Deportivo Rionegro, which later merged into Rionegro Águilas, the club where he won his first title in 2010. In 2011, he joined Atlético Junior, where he had some of the best periods of his career, scoring 37 goals in 64 games, and winning the league title in 2011. In 2017, he left Rionegro and moved to India to play for NorthEast United FC, and in 2018 he signed for Deportivo Táchira from Venezuela.

== Honours ==
=== Club ===
Rionegro Águilas

- Categoría Primera B (1): 2010

Atlético Junior

- Categoría Primera A (1): 2011-II

Atlético Nacional

- Categoría Primera A (1): 2014-I
