= David Montoya (footballer, born 1995) =

Colombian footballer

Personal information
- Full name: David Montoya Henao
- Date of birth: 1 September 1995 (age 31)
- Place of birth: Medellín, Colombia
- Height: 1.78 m (5 ft 10 in)
- Position: Centre-back

Team information
- Current team: Santiago Morning
- Number: 3

Youth career
- Escuela Belén San Bernardo
- Talentos Juniors
- Belén Las Playas
- Deportivo Rionegro

Senior career*
Years	Team	Apps	(Gls)
2014	Deportivo Rionegro	2	(0)
2015	Leones Urabá	3	(0)
2016–2018	Itagüí Leones	25	(1)
2019–2022	Leones	45	(0)
2019	→ Cortuluá (loan)	32	(0)
2020–2021	→ Deportes La Serena (loan)	8	(0)
2024–2025	Atlético Cortegana	23	(4)
2025	Santiago City	8	(0)
2026–	Santiago Morning	0	(0)
- * Club domestic league appearances and goals as of 12 December 2025

David Montoya Henao (born 1 September 1995) is a Colombian professional footballer who plays as a Center-back for Chilean club Santiago Morning.

== Career ==
Born in Medellín, Colombia, Montoya was with Escuela Belén San Bernardo, Talentos Juniors and Belén Las Playas before joining Leones, then called Deportivo Rionegro, with whom he made his professional debut. With them, he won the 2017 Primera B Torneo Finalización. In 2019, he was loaned out to Cortuluá.

In January 2020, Montoya moved abroad and joined on loan to Deportes La Serena in the Chilean Primera División. In February 2021, he left Deportes La Serena and returned to Leones.

During the 2024–25 season, Montoya played for Spanish club Atlético Cortegana in the Primera Andaluza.

In 2025, Montoya returned to Chile and joined Santiago City in the Segunda División Profesional. On 17 March 2026, he switched to Santiago Morning.
