= Juan Camilo Roa =

Colombian footballer (born 1994)

Personal information
- Full name: Juan Camilo Roa Estrada
- Date of birth: 14 November 1994 (age 31)
- Place of birth: Sabanalarga, Atlántico, Colombia
- Height: 1.78 m (5 ft 10 in)
- Position: Midfielder

Team information
- Current team: Jaguares de Cordoba
- Number: 6

Senior career*
Years	Team	Apps	(Gls)
2013–2014	Uniautónoma		
2015–2016	Cortuluá	84	(0)
2017–2018	Atlético Junior	4	(0)
2018	→ Jaguares de Córdoba (loan)	36	(2)
2019–2021	Cortuluá	84	(10)
2022–2023	Deportivo Pasto	74	(0)
2024–	Jaguares de Córdoba	23	(2)
- * Club domestic league appearances and goals as of 17 August 2023

Juan Camilo Roa Estrada (born 14 November 1994) is a Colombian footballer who plays as a midfielder for Jaguares de Cordoba in the Categoría Primera A.

== Honours ==
=== Club ===
Uniautónoma

- Primera B (1): 2013

Junior

- Copa Colombia (1): 2017
