= Atlético Juventud Girardot =

Colombian football club

- Full name: Atlético Juventud Girardot Fútbol Club
- Nickname(s): Los juveniles Porteños
- Founded: 2007
- Dissolved: 2010
- Ground: Estadio Luis Carlos Galán Sarmiento; Girardot, Colombia
Home colours	Away colours

Atlético Juventud Girardot was a Colombian football team, based in Girardot, Colombia. The club was founded in Soacha in 2007 as Atlético Juventud Soacha, before it relocated in 2010. The club was dissolved the same year after it sold its licence to Fortaleza.

== History ==
In the 2008 season, the club played its first campaign in the Primera B under the name Atlético Juventud Soacha. The team, managed by Arturo Leyva, reached the Torneo Apertura semifinals, a performance it was unable to replicate in the Torneo Finalización, ultimately finishing eighth in the aggregate table. In the 2008 Copa Colombia, the Soacha-based team placed last in Group F during the first phase. Throughout 2008 and 2009, the club played its home matches in the municipality of Soacha, Cundinamarca.

For the 2010 season, following a lack of financial support from the Soacha municipal government and the Cundinamarca Department, the club relocated to Girardot after reaching a financial agreement with the local government. At the end of the campaign, in which the team finished second to last, Juventud Girardot ceased operations after selling its license to Fortaleza.

== See also ==
- Girardot F.C.
