= Águilas Doradas =

Association football club in Colombia

- Full name: Águilas Doradas S.A.
- Nicknames: Las Águilas Doradas (The Golden Eagles); El Equipo Dorado (The Golden Team); El Equipo Joven de Colombia (Colombia's Young Team)
- Founded: 16 July 2008; 18 years ago (as Itagüí Ditaires)
- Ground: Alberto Grisales
- Capacity: 14,000
- Owner: Talento Dorado S.A.
- President: Paola Salazar
- Head coach: Flavio Robatto
- League: Categoría Primera A
- 2025: Primera A, 12th of 20
- Website: aguilasdoradas.com.co
| Home colours | Away colours |

Águilas Doradas is a professional Colombian football team based in Rionegro that currently plays in the Categoría Primera A. Although the club plays its home games at the Alberto Grisales stadium in Rionegro, it has been previously based in Itagüí, Pereira, and Sincelejo. The club also has a futsal team.

== History ==
On 16 July 2008, the club was founded as Itagüí Ditaires after a group of investors led by former football player José Fernando Salazar bought the team Bajo Cauca and relocated it to Itagüí.

Itagüí began playing in the Primera B's 2008 Finalización championship, where they finished sixth out of nine teams in their group. In the 2009 Apertura, Itagüí had a great performance; they finished second in their group during the regular season, then won their group in the playoffs, before losing the final to Cortuluá on penalties. In the 2009 Finalización, the club had the most points out of all 18 in the regular season, with 33, and were serious candidates to win the title. However, they faltered in the playoffs and finished last with only three points. For the 2010 season DIMAYOR changed the Primera B format to a year-long tournament. Itagüí topped the regular season table, advancing to the playoffs. In the playoffs, they won their group, winning five and only losing one, which qualified them for the final against Deportivo Pasto. In the finals, the club won 3–2 on aggregate, becoming champions and being promoted to the Primera A, mainly with the help of Luis Páez, who scored in both legs. In that same year, the club also reached the Copa Colombia finals, knocking Deportes Tolima, Atlético Nacional, and Millonarios out of the competition successively before losing to Deportivo Cali.

They made their Primera A debut in 2011, being the first time in the top-flight that four teams from the same department (Antioquia) competed for the grand prize.

The club was expelled from Itagüí in May 2014, following a dispute between the club's chairman and the city's mayor regarding the financial support received by the club from Itagüí's local government. The decision to expel the club from the city was made by the mayor after being publicly criticized by the club's chairman for the scarce support provided to the club. This incident meant the team would change its name to Águilas Pereira, moving to the city of Pereira and playing its home matches at Hernán Ramírez Villegas stadium, a change approved by DIMAYOR's Assembly in an extraordinary meeting on 14 July 2014.

In March 2015, the club moved to Rionegro, changing its name to Águilas Doradas, citing economic losses as the main reason. On 5 January 2016 the club announced it would be changing its name to Rionegro Águilas and its kit colour would be switched from its traditional golden to red. The club returned to its usual primary kit colours of golden and black for the 2020 season.

In April 2021, the club made world headlines when they were forced to play a league match with Boyacá Chicó using only seven players due to a rule imposed by DIMAYOR in the context of the COVID-19 pandemic, which stated that a team had to play if they had at least seven players available. Águilas Doradas were unable to field an entire team due to fifteen players testing positive for COVID-19 and seven players out injured. As a result, the club sent a request to DIMAYOR to have the match postponed, which was declined. Eventually the game was called off after a player got injured with ten minutes remaining, leaving the team with only six players and below the minimum needed.

Since the 2022 Finalización tournament, in which they were managed by Leonel Álvarez, Águilas Doradas started making consistent campaigns in which they made it to the semifinal stage of the competition. In that tournament, they ended the first stage in second place behind Santa Fe, but failed to advance to the finals despite having won the first three matches in their semifinal group. For the following season, the club signed the debutant coach Lucas González, with whom they topped the first stage of the 2023 Apertura with 39 points in 20 matches, but the team failed to keep their momentum in the semifinals and they were eliminated after only collecting 2 points in their following 6 games. González was replaced by Venezuelan manager César Farías for the 2023 Finalización, in which Águilas ended the first stage in first place once again but also became the first team to achieve an unbeaten run in the first stage of the tournament. The team's unbeaten streak extended for 21 matches before being broken with a 4–0 home thrashing at the hands of Deportes Tolima, and Águilas failed to reach the finals of the competition, placing third in their group. However, the team's performance in both tournaments allowed them to qualify for the 2024 Copa Libertadores, after ending in first place in the season's aggregate table. The team entered the Copa Libertadores in the second stage, losing to Brazilian club Red Bull Bragantino on penalty kicks after two scoreless draws.

Prior to the start of the 2024 season, and due to disagreements with the local administration of Rionegro which included the eviction from their training venue, Águilas Doradas were granted approval by the General Assembly of DIMAYOR to seek a new venue for their home matches. Although the club stayed in Rionegro to play their home matches during the Apertura tournament, on 23 July 2024 it confirmed the relocation of its home matches to Sincelejo, Sucre Department, given the lack of support from the new local government as well as the difficulty in obtaining sponsorship by private enterprises. The club played its home matches during the 2024 Finalización tournament in Sincelejo, but the agreement with the local government was not renewed at the end of the season due to budget limitations and the club returned to Rionegro.

== Honours ==
=== Domestic ===
- Categoría Primera B
  - Winners (1): 2010
- Copa Colombia
  - Runners-up (1): 2010

== Performance in CONMEBOL competitions ==
- Copa Libertadores: 1 appearance

2024: Second stage

- Copa Sudamericana: 6 appearances

2013: Quarter-finals
2014: First stage
2015: Second stage
2017: First stage
2019: Second stage
2023: First stage

== Players ==
=== First-team squad ===
As of 24 September 2026

Note: Flags indicate national team as defined under FIFA eligibility rules; some limited exceptions apply. Players may hold more than one non-FIFA nationality.

| No. | Pos. | Nation | Player |
|---|---|---|---|
| 1 | GK | COL | Jorge Soto |
| 2 | DF | COL | John García |
| 3 | MF | ECU | Jhon Ontaneda |
| 4 | DF | COL | Andrés Mosquera |
| 5 | DF | COL | Lucho Vásquez |
| 6 | MF | COL | Iván Rojas |
| 7 | FW | COL | Eduar Arizalas |
| 8 | MF | COL | Andrés Ricaurte |
| 9 | FW | COL | Anthony Vásquez |
| 10 | MF | PAR | Junior Noguera |
| 13 | MF | COL | Jhon Meléndez (on loan from Santa Fe) |
| 15 | MF | COL | Fabián Charales |
| 16 | FW | ARG | Matías Ramírez (on loan from Godoy Cruz) |
| 17 | MF | COL | Tomás Blandón |

| No. | Pos. | Nation | Player |
|---|---|---|---|
| 18 | FW | COL | Andrés Carreño |
| 19 | MF | COL | Frank Lozano (captain) |
| 20 | DF | COL | Alberto Higgins |
| 21 | FW | COL | Ricardo Márquez (on loan from Unión Magdalena) |
| 24 | MF | COL | Juan Esteban Ávalo |
| 25 | MF | COL | Juan Camilo Roa |
| 26 | DF | COL | Dylan Lozano |
| 27 | MF | COL | Carlos Londoño |
| 28 | DF | COL | Sebastián Rodríguez |
| 30 | DF | COL | Nicolás Lara |
| 32 | DF | COL | Javier Mena |
| 33 | FW | COL | Juan Sebastián Quintero |
| 34 | GK | COL | Héctor Arango |
| — | FW | COL | Carlos Rojas |

=== Out on loan ===
Note: Flags indicate national team as defined under FIFA eligibility rules; some limited exceptions apply. Players may hold more than one non-FIFA nationality.

| No. | Pos. | Nation | Player |
|---|---|---|---|
| — | DF | COL | Diego Hernández (at Al-Shorta) |
| — | DF | COL | Mateo Puerta (at Santa Fe) |
| — | FW | COL | Royner Benítez (at Orsomarso) |

=== World Cup players ===
The following players were chosen to represent their country at the FIFA World Cup while contracted to Águilas Doradas.

- (Costa Rica) Jhonny Acosta (2018)

== Notable players ==
- (Colombia) Cleider Alzate (2008–2012), (2014–2015)
- (Colombia) Javier López Rodríguez (2008–2016)
- (Colombia) Jorge Aguirre (2009–2014)
- (Colombia) Luis Páez (2009–2010, 2012, 2015–2017)
- (Colombia) Carlos Mario Arboleda (2010–2016)
- (Colombia) Andrés Felipe Correa (2010–2013)
- (Colombia) Yessy Mena (2011–2014)
- (Colombia) Jhonny Vásquez (2011–2013, 2018)
- (Colombia) Luis Quiñones (2013)
- (Colombia) Édinson Palomino (2014–2018)
- (Colombia) Álvaro Angulo (2017–2022)
- (Costa Rica) Jhonny Acosta (2018)
- (Colombia) Kevin Castaño (2020–2023)
- (Equatorial Guinea) Carlos Bejarano (2020–2021)
- (Colombia) Marco Pérez (2022–2023)

== Managers ==
| Country | Name | Dates |
|---|---|---|
| Colombia | Carlos Hoyos | July 2008 – November 2009 |
| Colombia | Álvaro de Jesús Gómez | January 2010 – November 2010 |
| Colombia | Carlos Hoyos | December 2010 – April 2011 |
| Colombia | Álvaro de Jesús Gómez | May 2011 – December 2011 |
| Colombia | Hernán Torres | January 2012 – June 2012 |
| Colombia | Leonel Álvarez | July 2012 – December 2012 |
| Colombia | Jorge Luis Bernal | January 2013 – December 2013 |
| Colombia | Alberto Gamero | December 2013 – May 2014 |
| Colombia | Jorge Luis Bernal | June 2014 – September 2014 |
| Argentina | Óscar Quintabani | September 2014 – December 2014 |
| Colombia | Álvaro de Jesús Gómez | January 2015 – April 2015 |
| Argentina | Óscar Quintabani | April 2015 – September 2015 |
| Colombia | Néstor Otero | September 2015 – June 2016 |
| Colombia | Pedro Sarmiento | June 2016 – August 2016 |
| Colombia | Néstor Otero | August 2016 – April 2017 |
| Colombia | Óscar Pérez | May 2017 – August 2017 |
| Colombia | Diego Umaña | August 2017 – December 2017 |
| Colombia | Hernán Torres | December 2017 – May 2018 |
| Colombia | Jorge Luis Bernal | May 2018 – March 2019 |
| Paraguay | Ever Almeida | March 2019 – April 2019 |
| Colombia | Eduardo Cruz | April 2019 – June 2019 |
| Colombia | Flabio Torres | June 2019 – November 2019 |
| Venezuela | Francesco Stifano | December 2019 – December 2020 |
| Colombia | Hubert Bodhert | January 2021 – March 2021 |
| Venezuela | Francesco Stifano | March 2021 – November 2021 |
| Peru | Johan Fano (caretaker) | November 2021 – December 2021 |
| Colombia | Leonel Álvarez | January 2022 – December 2022 |
| Colombia | Lucas González | December 2022 – June 2023 |
| Venezuela | César Farías | June 2023 – January 2024 |
| Colombia | Hernán Darío Gómez | January 2024 – March 2024 |
| Colombia | José Luis García | March 2024 – October 2024 |
| Colombia | Juan Pablo Buch | October 2024 – November 2024 |
| Venezuela | Pedro Depablos | December 2024 – March 2025 |
| Paraguay | Gustavo Florentín | March 2025 – April 2025 |
| Colombia | Jhann Carlos López (caretaker) | April 2025 – June 2025 |
| Argentina | Pablo De Muner | June 2025 – August 2025 |
| Spain | Jonathan Risueño | September 2025 – November 2025 |
| Colombia | Juan David Niño | December 2025 – June 2026 |
| Argentina | Flavio Robatto | June 2026 – Present |

Source: Worldfootball.net

== See also ==
- Águilas Doradas (futsal)
