= Atlético de la Sabana =

Colombian football club

Atlético La Sabana
- Full name: Corporación Deportiva Atlético La Sabana
- Founded: 2005; 2006; 2008 (in Sincelejo as Corporación Deportiva Atlético La Sabana)
- Ground: Estadio Arturo Cumplido Sierra; Sincelejo, Colombia
- Capacity: 5,000
- Chairman: Félix Barreneche
- Manager: Víctor Gonzáles Scott
- League: Categoría Primera B
- 2010: 11
Home colours	Away colours

Atlético La Sabana was a Colombian football (soccer) team, based in Sincelejo, Colombia. The club was founded in late 2008 and played in Categoría Primera B as of 2009. The club was formerly known as Córdoba F.C. based in Córdoba, Colombia but due to financial difficulties, the club relocated to Sincelejo and was rebranded.

In 2011 due to financial problems, the team was sold to the Universidad Autónoma del Caribe and refounded as Universidad Autónoma F.C.

== Club history ==
???? - foundation as Itagui Florida SC.

2005 - renamed as Florida Soccer Club Medellin.

2006 - renamed as Corporacion Deportiva Córdoba Fútbol Club.

2009 - relocated to Sincelejo and renamed as Corporación Deportiva Atlético La Sabana.

== Notable players ==
- (Colombia) Nelson Asprilla
- (Colombia) Hernán Burbano
- (Colombia) Diego Causado
