= Córdoba F.C. =

Colombian football club

Córdoba
- Full name: Corporación Deportiva; Córdoba Fútbol Club
- Founded: 2006
- Dissolved: 2008
- Ground: Estadio Alberto Saibis Saker; Cereté, Córdoba, Colombia
- League: Categoría Primera B

Córdoba F.C. was a Colombian football (soccer) team, based in Montería, Córdoba, Colombia. The club was founded in 2006 and played in Categoría Primera B. Due to financial difficulties, the club was relocated at the end of the 2008 season to the city of Sincelejo and rebranded as Atlético La Sabana.
