= 1957–58 FC Basel season =

FC Basel
1957–58 season
- Chairman: Jules Düblin
- Manager: Rudi Strittich
- Ground: Landhof, Basel
- Nationalliga A: 9th
- Swiss Cup: Round 4
- Top goalscorer: League: Josef Hügi (18); All: Josef Hügi (18)
- Highest home attendance: 13,000 on 22 September 1957 vs Young Boys
- Lowest home attendance: 3,500 on 1 June 1958 vs Biel-Bienne
- Average home league attendance: 6,423

The 1957–58 season was Fussball Club Basel 1893's 64th season in their existence. It was their twelfth consecutive season in the top flight of Swiss football after their promotion from the Nationalliga B the season 1945–46. They played their home games in the Landhof, in the Wettstein Quarter in Kleinbasel. Jules Düblin was the club's chairman for his twelfth successive period.

== Overview ==
The Austrian ex-international footballer Rudi Strittich was hired as new team manager this season. He took over from Béla Sárosi who had moved on to Jahn Regensburg. Basel played a total of 42 games this season. Of these 42 matches 26 were in the domestic league, two were in the Swiss Cup and 14 were friendly matches. The friendly games resulted with seven victories and seven defeats. In total, including the test games and the cup competition, 17 games were won, six games were drawn and 19 games were lost. In their 42 games the team scored 107 goals and conceded 87.

Fourteen teams contested the 1957–58 Nationalliga A, these were the top 12 teams from the previous season and the two newly promoted teams FC Biel-Bienne and FC Grenchen. The last two teams in the table at the end of the season were to be relegated. Basel won nine of their 26 games and drew six times and lost eleven times. They scored 59 goals and conceded 53. Basel ended the championship with 24 points in 9th position. They were 19 points behind Young Boys who were able to defend their championship title. At the end of the league table Urania Genève Sport and FC Winterthur ended the season joint second last, each with 18 points, and therefore they had to play a relegation play-off. Urania won the play-off and therefore Winterthur suffered relegation together with FC Biel-Bienne who had finished in last position.

Josef Hügi was the Basel's top league goal scorer with 18 goals. He managed two hat-tricks during the league season, in the first game of the season on 25 August 1957 at home against Winterthur and in the last game of the season on 1 June 1958 at home against Biel-Bienne. Gottlieb Stäuble was the team's second best goal scorer with nine goals, Rudolf Burger netted eight times and both Hermann Suter and Hans Weber netted seven times.

Basel joined the Swiss Cup in the third principal round. They were drawn at home at the Landhof against lower tier local team FC Oten on 2 November 1957. Hans Weber scored five goals during the second half of the game as Basel won 8–0. In the fourth round Basel were also drawn at home against lower tier FC Bern but here Basel were knocked out. Young Boys won the competition and thus completed the double.

== Players ==
The following is the list of the Basel first team squad during the season 1957–58. The list includes players that were in the squad on the day that the Nationalliga A season started on 25 August 1957 but subsequently left the club after that date.

Note: Flags indicate national team as defined under FIFA eligibility rules; some limited exceptions apply. Players may hold more than one non-FIFA nationality.

No.	Pos.	Nation	Player
—	GK	SUI	Hansruedi Blatter
—	GK	SUI	Werner Schley
—	GK	SUI	Kurt Stettler (from Luzern)
—	DF	SUI	Werner Bopp
—	DF	SUI	Wilhelm Jermann
—	DF	SUI	Hans Hügi (I)
—	DF	SUI	Hansjörg Tschirky
—	DF	SUI	Hans Weber (from Lausanne-Sport)
—	MF	SUI	Gustav Borer
—	MF	FRA	Pierre Redolfi
—	MF	SUI	Gottlieb Stäuble

No.	Pos.	Nation	Player
—	MF	SUI	Silvan Thüler
—	FW	SUI	Rudolf Burger (from Nordstern Basel)
—	FW	SUI	Bernhard Chenaux (neu)
—	FW	SUI	Josef Hügi (II)
—	FW	SUI	Ernst Klauser (II)
—	FW	HUN	Janos Magyar (neu)
—	FW	SUI	Emil Müller (from Black Stars Basel)
—	FW	SUI	Hansueli Oberer
—	FW	SUI	Walter Rieder (neu)
—	FW	SUI	Raymond Simonet (neu)
—	FW	SUI	Hermann Suter
—	FW	ITA	Romano Zolin

Players who left the squad

Note: Flags indicate national team as defined under FIFA eligibility rules; some limited exceptions apply. Players may hold more than one non-FIFA nationality.

No.	Pos.	Nation	Player
—	DF	SUI	Hans-Rudolf Fitze (retired)
—	DF	SUI	Bruno Michaud (to Lausanne-Sport)
—	MF	SUI	Benedikt Frey
—	MF	SUI	Rudolf Rickenbacher (to La Chaux-de-Fonds)
—	FW	SUI	René Bader (retired)

No.	Pos.	Nation	Player
—	FW	SUI	Walter Bannwart (retired)
—	FW	SUI	Walter Bielser (retired)
—	FW	SUI	Pierre Geiser (to Nordstern Basel)
—	FW	SUI	Bruno Locher (II) (from Kleinhüningen)
—	FW	GER	Peter-Jürgen Sanmann (to SC Concordia von 1907)

== Results ==
Legend

Win Draw Loss Postponed

=== Friendly matches ===
==== Pre- and mid-season ====
27 July 1957 Pre-season	SC Kleinhüningen (Switzerland)	0–8	(Switzerland) Basel	Schorenmatte, Basel
16:30		Summary	(3x) Hügi (II) (2x) Burger (2x) Müller (1x) Oberer	Attendance: 900; Referee: (Switzerland) K. Keller Basel

3 August 1957 Pre-season	Basel (Switzerland)	3–0	(Austria) SVS Linz	Landhof, Basel
17:30	(1x) Weber (1x) Müller (1x) Hügi (I)	Summary		Attendance: 2,500; Referee: (Switzerland) M. Schreiber Reinach

8 August 1957 Pre-season	Basel	4–2	Cantonal Neuchatel	Landhof, Basel
18:30	Burger 27' (1:1); Hügi (II) 58' (2:1); Hügi (II) (3:1); Weber (4:1)	Summary	23' (0:1) Michaud (4:2) Beck	Attendance: 1,500; Referee: (Switzerland) K. Keller Basel

11 August 1957 Pre-season	Brühl St. Gallen	0–7	Basel	Espenmoos, St. Gallen
16:00		Summary	15' (0:1) Hügi (II); 39' (0:2) Müller; 42' (0:3) Oberer (0:4) Hügi (II) (0:5) Hügi (II) (0:6) Hügi (II) (0:7) Suter	Attendance: 2,000; Referee: (Switzerland) W. Werner St. Gallen

18 August 1955 Pre-season	Basel	1–4	RCD Espanyol	Landhof, Basel
15:00	Hügi (II) (1x)	Summary	(1x) Coll (1x) Gamiz (1x) Benavidez (1x) Arcas	Attendance: 8,000; Referee: (Switzerland) Paul Wyssling Zürich

==== Winter break ====
1 January 1958 Winter break	Basel	1–3	FK Partizan	Landhof, Basel
14:30	Frey 33' (1:1)	Summary	24' (0:1) Kaloperović; 34' (o.g. 1:2) Brodmann; 86' (1:3) Mihajlovic	Attendance: 4,800; Referee: (Switzerland) F. Buchmüller Zürich

=== Nationalliga A ===
==== League matches ====
25 August 1957 Round 1	Basel	8–1	Winterthur	Landhof, Basel
15:00	Hügi (II) 16' (1:0); Burger 18' (2:0); Weber 31' (3:0); Hügi (II) 42' (4:0); Hügi (II) 43' (5:0); Hügi (II) 47' (6:0); Burger 55' (7:0); Burger 81' (8:1)	Summary	74' (7:1) Perazza	Attendance: 7,000; Referee: (Switzerland) E. Guidi Bellinzona

31 August 1957 Round 2	Basel	6–0	Urania Genève Sport	Landhof, Basel
16:30	Weber 52' (1:0); Weber 67' (2:0); Weber 68' (3:0); Weber 70' (4:0); Hügi (II) 74' (5:0); Suter 78' (6:0)	Summary		Attendance: 6,500; Referee: (Switzerland) Victor Werner Schicker Bern

8 September 1957 Round 3	Lugano	2–0	Basel	Cornaredo, Lugano
	Kauer 16' (1:0); Steffanina 69' (2:0)	Summary		Attendance: 3,500; Referee: (Switzerland) Domeniconi Geneva

22 September 1957 Round 4	Basel	0–0	Young Boys	Landhof, Basel
15:00		Summary		Attendance: 13,000; Referee: (Switzerland) Josef Gulde St. Gallen

29 September 1957 Round 5	Grasshopper Club	1–0	Basel	Hardturm, Zürich
	Vukosavljević 34' (1:0)	Summary		Attendance: 13,000; Referee: (Switzerland) D. Mellet Lausanne

6 October 1957 Round 6	Basel	3–4	Grenchen	Landhof, Basel
16:00	Bopp 7' (pen. 1:1); Suter 30' (2:2); Müller 56' (3:4)	Summary	2' (0:1) Raboud (I); 29' (1:2) Karrer; 31' (2:3) Moser; 38' (2:4) Hamel	Attendance: 6,000; Referee: (Switzerland) Schüttel Sion

13 October 1957 Round 7	La Chaux-de-Fonds	1–0	Basel	Stade Charrière, La Chaux-de-Fonds
15:00	Cornuel 87' (1:0)	Summary		Attendance: 4,000; Referee: (Switzerland) F. Schorer Interlaken

20 October 1957 Round 8	Basel	P – P	Lausanne-Sport	Landhof, Basel
		[ Summary]

27 October 1957 Round 9	Servette	2–2	Basel	Charmilles Stadium, Geneva
	Fatton 17' (1:0); Fatton 67' (2:1)	Summary	45' (pen. 1:1) Hügi (I); 78' (2:2) Burger	Attendance: 6,500; Referee: (Switzerland) E. Guidi Bellinzona

10 November 1957 Round 10	Basel	3–2	Bellinzona	Landhof, Basel
14:30	Suter 3' (1:0); Burger 52' (2:2); Suter 88' (3:2)	Summary	9' (1:1) Fontana; 31' (o.g. 1:2) Redolfi	Attendance: 5,500; Referee: (Switzerland) Guinnard Gletterens

17.11 1957 Round 11	Chiasso	1–1	Basel	Stadio Via Comacini, Chiasso
	Riva 3' (1:0)	Summary	80' (o.g. 1:1)	Attendance: 3,000; Referee: (Switzerland) Victor Werner Schicker Bern

8 December 1957 Round 12	Basel	1–6	Young Fellows Zürich	Landhof, Basel
14:30	Weber 4' (1:0)	Summary	8' (1:1) Schennach; 23' (1:2) Buhtz; 27' (1:3) Schönmann; 63' (1:4) Buhtz; 68' (1:5) Weissbaum; 78' (1:6) Reutlinger	Attendance: 3,800; Referee: (Switzerland) Othmar Huber Thun

15 December 1957 Round 13	Biel-Bienne	2–2	Basel	Gurzelen Stadion, Biel/Bienne
	Hügi (I) 9' (o.g. 1:0); Koller 70' (pen. 2:2)	Summary	44' (1:1) Stäuble; 57' (1:2) Stäuble	Attendance: 6,300; Referee: (Switzerland) Schüttel Sion

29 December 1957 Round 8	Basel	1–1	Lausanne-Sport	Landhof, Basel
14:30	Stäuble 68' (1:1)	Summary	63' (0:1) Rösch	Attendance: 4,500; Referee: (Switzerland) Paul Wyssling Zürich
Note: Minute of silence for the death of Hans Rupprecht (honorary member and former chairman (7 July 1928 to 6 July 1929).

16 February 1958 Round 14	Winterthur	2–2	Basel	Schützenwiese, Winterthur
	Berger 38' (pen. 1:0); Etterlin 77' (2:2)	Summary	51' (1:1) Weber; 60' (1:2) Burger	Attendance: 4,000; Referee: (Switzerland) W. Rufli Bremgarten
Note: Minute of silence for Manchester United and all the victims of the Munich air disaster

23 February 1958 Round 15	Urania Genève Sport	3–2	Basel	Stade de Frontenex, Geneva
	Dufau 32' (1:0); Prod'hom 60' (2:0); Linder 83' (3:1)	Summary	77' (2:1) Chenaux; 86' (3:2) Hügi (II)	Attendance: 4,500; Referee: (Switzerland) W. Müller Baden

2 March 1958 Round 16	Basel	1–2	Lugano	Landhof, Basel
15:00	Hügi (II) 67' (1:2)	Summary	(red card) 18' Perroud; 49' (0:1) Meylan; 66' (0:2) Bernasconi; (yellow card) Clerici	Attendance: 6,200; Referee: (Switzerland) D. Mellet Lausanne

9 March 1958 Round 17	Young Boys	6–2	Basel	Wankdorf Stadium, Bern
	Spicher 11' (1:0); Häuptli 13' (2:0); Wechselberger 16' (3:0); Rey 54' (4:1); Häuptli 70' (5:1) Häuptli; 88' (6:2)	Summary	40' (3:1) Hügi (II); 84' (5:2) Stäuble	Attendance: 7,500; Referee: (Switzerland) Guinnard Gletterens

16 March 1958 Round 18	Basel	1–3	Grasshopper Club	Landhof, Basel
15:00	Klauser (II) 85' (1:3)	Summary	38' (0:1) Rognoni; 64' (0:2) Ballaman; 68' (0:3) Robbiani	Attendance: 7,500; Referee: (Switzerland) Domeniconi Geneva

23 March 1958 Round 19	Grenchen	3–4	Basel	Stadion Brühl, Grenchen
	Glisovic 37' (1:2); Hamel 40' (2:2); Morf 78' (pen. 3:4)	Summary	1' (0:1) Hügi (II); 20' (0:2) Burger; 62' (2:3) Magyar; 72' (2:4) Hügi (II)	Attendance: 3,000; Referee: (Switzerland) Paul Wyssling Zürich

30 March 1958 Round 20	Basel	2–1	La Chaux-de-Fonds	Landhof, Basel
15:00	Hügi (II) 61' (1:1); Hügi (II) 64' (2:1)	Summary	55' (0:1) Antenen	Attendance: 7,000; Referee: (Switzerland) Schüttel Sion

13 April 1958 Round 21	Lausanne-Sport	0–1	Basel	Olympique de la Pontaise, Lausanne
15:00		Summary	87' (o.g. 0:1) Michaud	Attendance: 3,500; Referee: (Switzerland) Othmar Huber Thun

20 April 1958 Round 22	Basel	6–2	Servette	Landhof, Basel
15:30	Hügi (II) 33' (1:2); Stäuble 69' (2:2); Hügi (II) 48' (3:2); Stäuble 49' (4:2); Gonins 54' (o.g. 5:2); Stäuble 82' (6:2)	Summary	11' (o.g. 0:1) Thüler; 33' (0:2) Eschmann	Attendance: 8,000; Referee: (Switzerland) Paul Wyssling Zürich

4 May 1958 Round 23	Bellinzona	3–2	Basel	Stadio Comunale, Bellinzona
	Sartori 80' (pen. 1:2); Ghilardi 81' (2:2); Sartori 87' (3:2)	Summary	35' (0:1) Hügi (II); 64' (0:2) Stäuble	Attendance: 2,000; Referee: (Switzerland) Victor Werner Schicker Bern

11 May 1958 Round 24	Basel	0–2	Chiasso	Landhof, Basel
15:00		Summary	13' (0:1) Riva; 68' (0:2) Boffi	Attendance: 5,000; Referee: (Switzerland) Surdez Delémont

18 May 1958 Round 25	Young Fellows Zürich	1–3	Basel	Förrlibuck, Zürich
15:00	Bossi 28' (1:1)	Summary	15' (0:1) Chenaux; 37' (1:2) Suter; 42' (1:3) Burger	Attendance: 4,000; Referee: (Switzerland) D. Mellet Lausanne

1 June 1958 Round 26	Basel	6–2	Biel-Bienne	Landhof, Basel
15:00	Hügi (II) 3' (1:0); Suter 7' (2:0); Stäuble 13' (3:0); Hügi (II) 63' (4:2); Hügi (II) 72' (5:2); Suter 87' (6:2)	Summary	19' (3:1) Maurer; 30' (3:2) Koller; (penalty missed) 51′ Maurer	Attendance: 3,500; Referee: (Switzerland) Domeniconi Geneva

==== League table ====
Pos	Team	Pld	W	D	L	GF	GA	GD	Pts	Qualification
1	Young Boys	26	20	3	3	76	37	+39	43	Champions and Swiss Cup winners
2	Grasshopper Club	26	16	3	7	81	47	+34	35	
3	Chiasso	26	15	5	6	56	43	+13	35	
4	La Chaux-de-Fonds	26	13	5	8	56	55	+1	31	
5	Grenchen	26	9	9	8	54	52	+2	27	
6	Lausanne-Sport	26	9	9	8	51	52	−1	27	
7	Young Fellows Zürich	26	10	5	11	57	54	+3	25	
8	Servette	26	10	4	12	50	47	+3	24	
9	Basel	26	9	6	11	59	53	+6	24	
10	Bellinzona	26	8	5	13	35	52	−17	21	
11	Lugano	26	7	6	13	36	47	−11	20	
12	Urania Genève Sport	26	7	4	15	38	55	−17	18	Play-off winners, remain in Nationalliga A
13	Winterthur	26	6	6	14	51	76	−25	18	Play-off losers, relegated to Nationalliga B
14	Biel-Bienne	26	6	4	16	25	55	−30	16	Relegated to Nationalliga B

Source: rsssf.com

=== Swiss Cup ===
2 November 1957 Round 3	Basel	8–0	FC Olten	Landhof, Basel
14:30	Borer 17' (1:0); Hügi (II) (penalty missed) 30′ Stäuble 38' (2:0); Müller 44' (3:0); Weber 51' (4:0); Weber 53' (5:0); Weber 87' (6:0); Weber 88' (7:0); Weber 89' (8:0)	Summary	(penalty missed) 50′	Attendance: 2,000; Referee: (Switzerland) Pic Le Noirmont

1 December 1957 Round 4	Basel	1–2	FC Bern	Landhof, Basel
14:30	Oberer 62' (1:1)	Summary	18' (0:1) Schott; 63' (1:2) Casali (I)	Attendance: 3,800; Referee: (Switzerland) Josef Gulde St. Gallen

== See also ==
- History of FC Basel
- List of FC Basel players
- List of FC Basel seasons

== Sources ==
- Die ersten 125 Jahre. Publisher: Josef Zindel im Friedrich Reinhardt Verlag, Basel. ISBN 978-3-7245-2305-5
- The FCB team 1957–58 at fcb-archiv.ch
- Switzerland 1957–58 by Erik Garin at Rec.Sport.Soccer Statistics Foundation
