= 1958–59 FC Basel season =

FC Basel
1958–59 season
- Chairman: Jules Düblin
- Manager: until 30 November 1958 (Austria) Rudi Strittich from 1 December (Switzerland) René Bader
- Ground: Landhof, Basel
- Nationalliga A: 6th
- Swiss Cup: Round of 32
- Top goalscorer: League: Josef Hügi and Gottlieb Stäuble (both 12); All: Josef Hügi (14)
- Highest home attendance: 11,500 on 9 November 1958 vs BSC Young Boys
- Lowest home attendance: 3,500 on 12 October 1958 vs Bellinzona and on 7 June 1959 vs Young Fellows Zürich
- Average home league attendance: 6,023

The 1958–59 season was Fussball Club Basel 1893's 65th season in their existence. It was their thirteenth consecutive season in the top flight of Swiss football after their promotion from the Nationalliga B the season 1945–46. They played their home games in the Landhof, in the Wettstein Quarter in Kleinbasel. Jules Düblin was the club's chairman for his 13th successive, but final, period. Düblin presided the club during the period July 1946 until Mai 1959 and in the club's history he is the most permanent president that the club has had to date.

== Overview ==
The Austrian ex-international footballer Rudi Strittich was team manager for the second successive season. The club directors and the team management strengthened the team following the previous disappointing season. Bruno Michaud returned from Lausanne-Sport, Fredy Kehrli, Jean-Jacques Maurer and Charles Turin were hired from Biel-Bienne who had suffered relegation the previous season. Roberto Frigerio was hired from Schaffhausen and Antoine Kohn from Karlsruher SC. But on 30 November 1958 Basel were beaten 0–2 by FC Moutier, a team from the 1 Liga (third highest tier of Swiss football), and because the Basel had lost their previous three league matches this was one bad result too many. Even for club chairman Jules Düblin, who was known as prudent and cautious, this was too much and he replaced Strittich through their ex-trainer René Bader.

Basel played a total of 50 games this season. Of these 50 matches 26 were in the domestic league, two were in the Swiss Cup and 22 were friendly matches. The friendly games resulted with twelve victories, five draws and five defeats. In total, including the test games and the cup competition, 24 games were won, 10 games were drawn and 16 games were lost. In these 50 games the team scored 126 goals and conceded 101.

Fourteen teams contested the 1958–59 Nationalliga A, these were the top 12 teams from the previous season and the two newly promoted teams FC Zürich and FC Luzern. At the end of the season the last two teams in the table were to be relegated. Basel started badly into the new season, losing the first game 1–2 against La Chaux-de-Fonds and then losing at home 1–4 against Grenchen. Then, despite two high wins, 5–0 away against Lausanne-Sport and 6–1 at home against Bellinzona, the afore mentioned three defeats against Young Boys, Zürich and Grasshopper Club caused the change in manager position. But under the new manager things did not change immediately, the lowest point was after round 15 as the team slipped to second last position in the table. But in the last 11 rounds the team lost only one more match and rose in the table to sixth position.

Basel entered the Swiss Cup in the third principal round. They were drawn at home at the Landhof against third tier local team Old Boys. The match was played on 26 October and despite the fact that former Basel goalkeeper Gianfranco de Taddeo, who now played for the Old Boys, held a penalty taken by Hans Weber, Basel won 3–0. In the next round Basel were drawn and lost against FC Moutier. Thus Basel's short and disappointing cup season ended here. As mentioned before, the consequence of this defeat was that team manager Rudi Strittich was fired. Grenchen won the cup this season.

== Players ==
The following is the list of the Basel first team squad during the season 1958–59. The list includes players that were in the squad on the day that the Nationalliga A season started on 31 August 1958 but subsequently left the club after that date.

Note: Flags indicate national team as defined under FIFA eligibility rules; some limited exceptions apply. Players may hold more than one non-FIFA nationality.

No.	Pos.	Nation	Player
—	GK	SUI	René Jeker (from Concordia Basel)
—	GK	SUI	Kurt Stettler
—	GK	SUI	Walter Wider (from Solothurn)
—	DF	SUI	Werner Bopp
—	DF	SUI	Hans Hügi (I)
—	DF	SUI	Fredy Kehrli (from Biel-Bienne)
—	DF	SUI	Bruno Michaud (from Lausanne-Sport)
—	DF	SUI	Hans Weber
—	DF	SUI	Jules Wyss (from SC Kleinhüningen)
—	MF	SUI	René Jaeck (from Schaffhausen)
—	MF	SUI	Jean-Jacques Maurer (from Biel-Bienne)
—	MF	SUI	Rudolf Rickenbacher (from La Chaux-de-Fonds)

No.	Pos.	Nation	Player
—	MF	SUI	Gottlieb Stäuble
—	MF	SUI	Silvan Thüler
—	MF	SUI	Charles Turin (from Biel-Bienne)
—	FW	SUI	Rudolf Burger
—	FW	SUI	Bernhard Chenaux
—	FW	SUI	Roberto Frigerio (from Schaffhausen)
—	FW	SUI	Josef Hügi (II)
—	FW	LUX	Antoine Kohn (from Karlsruher SC)
—	FW	GER	Otto Ludwig
—	FW	SUI	Hansueli Oberer
—	FW	SUI	Raymond Simonet
—	FW	SUI	Hermann Suter

Players who left the squad

Note: Flags indicate national team as defined under FIFA eligibility rules; some limited exceptions apply. Players may hold more than one non-FIFA nationality.

No.	Pos.	Nation	Player
—	GK	SUI	Hansruedi Blatter
—	GK	SUI	Werner Schley (to Zürich)
—	DF	SUI	Wilhelm Jermann (to FC Laufen)
—	DF	SUI	Hansjörg Tschirky
—	MF	SUI	Gustav Borer (to Aarau)

No.	Pos.	Nation	Player
—	MF	FRA	Pierre Redolfi (to FC Hegenheim)
—	FW	SUI	Ernst Klauser (II) (to Black Stars Basel)
—	FW	HUN	Janos Magyar
—	FW	SUI	Emil Müller (to Black Stars Basel)
—	FW	SUI	Walter Rieder
—	FW	ITA	Romano Zolin

== Results ==
Legend

Win Draw Loss Postponed

=== Friendly matches ===
==== Pre- and mid-season ====
July 1958 Pre-season	FC Kickers Luzern (Switzerland)	1–3	(Switzerland) Basel	Luzern
	Goal	Summary	Goal

July 1958 Pre-season	ASCA Wittelsheim (France)	2–4	(Switzerland) Basel	Wittelsheim
	Goal	Summary	Goal

July 1958 Pre-season	FC Saint-Louis (France)	1–2	(Switzerland) Basel	Saint-Louis
	Goal	Summary	Goal

23 July 1958 Pre-season	FC Arlesheim (Switzerland)	1–10	(Switzerland) Basel	Arlesheim
	(1x)	Summary	(8x) Hügi (II) (1x) (1x)

27 July 1958 Pre-season	Basel (Switzerland)	3–2	(Switzerland) FC Bern	Eichhölzli, Zwingen
16:30	Hügi (II) 10' (1:1); Frigerio (2:0); Kohn (3:0)	Summary	7' (0:1) Schott; 73' (3:2) Schott	Attendance: 2,500; Referee: (Switzerland) Gottfried Dienst Basel
Note: Anniversary game 25 years FC Zwingen

3 August 1958 Pre-season	Freiburger FC (Germany)	5–0	(Switzerland) Basel	Elztalstadion, Waldkirch
	Busch (3x); Schukraft (1x); Höge (1x)	Summary		Attendance: 2,000; Referee: (Germany) Walter Stemmler Offenburg
Note: Anniversary game 50 years SV Waldkirch

10 August 1958 Pre-season	1. FC Köln (Germany)	4–1	(Switzerland) Basel	Köln
	Schäfer 41' (1:1); Schäfer 42' (2:1); Schäfer 46' (3:1); Sturm (4:1)	Summary	Goal	Attendance: 7,000

16 August 1958 Friendship Cup	Basel (Switzerland)	1–1 (4 – 4 p)	(Switzerland) Lugano	Landhof, Basel
	Hügi (II) 10' (1:0)	Summary	(1:1) Pantellini	Attendance: 7,000; Referee: (Switzerland) W. Müller Baden
	Penalties
	(penalty scored) (penalty scored) (penalty scored) (penalty scored); Hügi (II) (penalty missed)		(penalty scored) (penalty scored) (penalty scored) (penalty scored); (penalty missed) Tibor
Note: Friendship Cup Basel–Ticino: 10 years of US Ticinese Basel. Penalty shoot-out 5 penalties per team. Lugano win on toss of coin.

17 August 1958 Friendship Cup	Basel (Switzerland)	3–1	(Switzerland) Concordia Basel	Landhof, Basel
	Frigerio 5' (1:0); 30' (o.g. 1:2); Kohn (3:1)	Summary	13' (1:1) Hosp	Attendance: 2,500; Referee: (Switzerland) Surdez Delémont
Note: Friendship Cup Basel–Ticino: 10 years of US Ticinese Basel.

21 August 1958 Pre-season	Basel (Switzerland)	2–2	(Belgium) Royal Olympic Club de Charleroi	Landhof, Basel
20:00	Hügi (II) (1:1); Jaeck 53' (2:1)	Summary	(0:1) Gosseries; 73' (2:2) Frerotte	Attendance: 1,400; Referee: (Switzerland) Gottfried Dienst Basel
Note: Game originally scheduled for Tuesday, postponed until Thursday due to bad weather.

24 August 1958 Pre-season	Schaffhausen (Switzerland)	3–4	(Switzerland) Basel	Stadion Breite, Schaffhausen
	Brändli (1x); Knobloch (1x); Zannin (1x)	Summary	(1x) Frigerio (1x) Hügi (II) (1x) Kohn (1x) Weber	Attendance: 1,800; Referee: (Switzerland) Paul Wyssling Zürich

20 September 1958 Mid-season	Solothurn (Switzerland)	2–6	(Switzerland) Basel	Stadion FC Solothurn, Solothurn
	Fedeli 40' (1:4); Zürcher 48' (2:4)	Summary	15' (0:1) Hügi (II); 16' (0:2) Kohn (0:3) Kohn; 31' (0:4) Kohn (2:5) Hügi (II) (2:6) Stäuble	Attendance: 800; Referee: (Switzerland) von Arx Biel/Bienne
Note: Transfer game Walter Wider

23 September 1958 Mid-season	Basel (Switzerland)	3–5	(Switzerland) Zürich	Landhof, Basel
20:00	Stäuble 16' (1:1); Stäuble 20' (2:1); Kohn 70' (3:5)	Summary	8' (0:1) Probst; 24' (2:2) Leimgruber; 55' (2:3) Probst; 57' (2:4) Probst; 26' (2:5) Corti	Attendance: 2,600; Referee: (Switzerland) W. Müller Baden
Note: Transfer game Werner Schley

4 October 1958 Mid-season	Basel (Switzerland)	7–1	(Switzerland) FC Allschwil	Landhof, Basel
	Suter (1:1); Otto Ludwig (2:1); Kohn (3:1)	Summary	Goal	Referee: (Switzerland) M. Schreiber Reinach

7 October 1958 Mid-season	Royal Olympic Club de Charleroi (Belgium)	2–4	(Switzerland) Basel	Stade de la Neuville, Charleroi Belgium
	Deschrijver 4' (1:0); Delire 55' (2:0)	Summary	67' (2:1) Suter; 69' (2:2) Hügi (II); 70' (2:3) Frigerio; 88' (2:4) Hügi (II)	Attendance: 5,000; Referee: (Switzerland) Karl Lescart

22 October 1958 Mid-season	Basel (Switzerland)	2–2	(Germany) Karlsruher SC	St. Jakob Stadium, Basel
20:00	Burger (2x)	Summary	(1x) Beck (1x) Schmidt	Attendance: 3,000; Referee: (Switzerland) Fischlewitz Basel

==== Winter break to end of season ====
14 February 1959 Winter break	Winterthur (Switzerland)	3–3	(Switzerland) Basel	Schützenwiese, Winterthur
16:00	Vukosavljević 5' (1:0); Gantenbein 43' (2:1); Akeret 48' (3:2)	Summary	19' (1:1) Hügi (II) (2:2) Hügi (II); 57' (3:3) Burger	Attendance: 2,200; Referee: (Switzerland) Anton Bucheli Luzern

15 February 1959 Winter break	Concordia Basel (Switzerland)	1–1	(Switzerland) Basel	St. Jakob Stadium, Basel
14:30	Marti 11' (1:0)	Summary	28' (1:1) Hügi (II)	Attendance: 1,100; Referee: (Switzerland) M. Schreiber Reinach

22 February 1959 Winter break	Basel (Switzerland)	4–2	(Switzerland) Vevey-Sports	Landhof, Basel
14:30	Oberer 11' (pen. 1:0); Burger 19' (2:0); Turin (3:1); Hügi (II) (4:2)	Summary	27' (2:1) Lausche (3:2) Carrard	Attendance: 1,000; Referee: (Switzerland) W. Müller Baden

19 April 1959 Mid-season	Basel (Switzerland)	2–3	(Croatia) HNK Rijeka	Landhof, Basel
16:30	Hügi (II) (2x)	Summary	(2x) Lalic (1x) Berec	Attendance: 2,500; Referee: (Switzerland) Victor Werner Schicker Bern

14 May 1959 Mid-season	Basel (Switzerland)	0–4	(Germany) SpVgg Fürth	Landhof, Basel
18:30		Summary	(o.g.0:1) (0:2) Schmidt (0:3) Appis (0:4) Wagner	Attendance: 2,000; Referee: (Switzerland) Othmar Huber Thun
Note: The game was abandoned in the 70th minute due to darkness

24 June 1959 End of season	Basel (Switzerland)	4–3	(Netherlands) Sparta Rotterdam	Landhof, Basel
18:30	Stäuble (2x); Hügi (II) (1x) (o.g.)	Summary	(3x) Daniels	Attendance: 3,000; Referee: (Switzerland) D. Mellet Lausanne

=== Nationalliga A ===
==== League matches ====
31 August 1958 Round 1	La Chaux-de-Fonds	2–1	Basel	Stade Charrière, La Chaux-de-Fonds
15:00	Csernai 8' (1:0); Gigandet 28' (2:0)	Summary	60' (1:2) Kohn	Attendance: 4,000; Referee: (Switzerland) D. Mellet Lausanne

6 September 1958 Round 2	Basel	1–4	Grenchen	St. Jakob Stadium, Basel
20:00	Kohn 71' (1:4)	Summary	15' (0:1) Glisovic; 30' (0:2) Glisovic; 32' (0:3) Karrer; 67' (0:4) Moser	Attendance: 7,000; Referee: (Switzerland) Josef Gulde St. Gallen

14 September 1958 Round 3	Lausanne-Sport	0–5	Basel	Olympique de la Pontaise, Lausanne
15:30		Summary	14' (0:1) Suter; 39' (0:2) Kohn; 58' (0:3) Stäuble; 69' (0:4) Suter; 79' (0:5) Otto Ludwig	Attendance: 3,500; Referee: (Switzerland) E. Guidi Bellinzona

28 September 1958 Round 4	Basel	0–0	Chiasso	Landhof, Basel
15:00		Summary		Attendance: 6,500; Referee: (Switzerland) Othmar Huber Thun

5 October 1958 Round 5	Lugano	P – P	Basel	Cornaredo, Lugano
		[ Summary]

12 October 1958 Round 6	Basel	6–1	Bellinzona	Landhof, Basel
15:00	Suter 15' (1:1); Stäuble 31' (2:1); Suter 55' (3:1); Stäuble 73' (4:1); Oberer 78' (5:1); Weber 86' (pen. 6:1)	Summary	8' (0:1) Sartori	Attendance: 3,500; Referee: (Switzerland) Roland David Lausanne

19 October 1958 Round 7	Luzern	2–4	Basel	Stadion Allmend, Luzern
15:00	Frigerio 52' (o.g. 1:3); Brühlmann 68' (2:4)	Summary	25' (0:1) Hügi (II); 36' (0:2) Kohn; 43' (0:3) Hügi (II); 57' (1:4) Suter	Attendance: 9,300; Referee: (Switzerland) Meister Neuchâtel

9 November 1958 Round 8	Basel	2–3	Young Boys	Landhof, Basel
14:30	Kohn 2' (1:0); Hügi (II) 31' (2:0)	Summary	54' (2:1) Wechselberger; 58' (pen. 2:2) Bigler; 80' (2:3) Wechselberger	Attendance: 11,500; Referee: (Switzerland) D. Mellet Lausanne

16 November 1958 Round 9	Zürich	3–1	Basel	Letzigrund, Zürich
14:45	Leimgruber 27' (1:0); Feller 57' (2:0); Leimgruber 87' (3:1)	Summary	85' (2:1) Hügi (II)	Attendance: 13,000; Referee: (Switzerland) Roland David Lausanne

23 November 1958 Round 10	Basel	2–4	Grasshopper Club	Landhof, Basel
14:30	Hügi (II) 70' (1:3); Maurer 85' (pen 2:4)	Summary	30' (0:1) Duret; 51' (0:2) Duret; 54' (0:3) Scheller; 76' (1:4) Scheller	Attendance: 8,000; Referee: (Switzerland) Domeniconi Geneva

7 December 1958 Round 11	Young Fellows Zürich	1–0	Basel	Hardturm, Zürich
14:30	Laubacher 60' (1:0)	Summary		Attendance: 6,000; Referee: (Switzerland) E. Guidi Bellinzona

14 December 1958 Round 12	Urania Genève Sport	1–3	Basel	Stade de Frontenex, Geneva
	Pasteur 75' (pen. 1:2)	Summary	15' (pen. 0:1) Maurer; 50' (0:2) Kohn; 86' (1:3) Hügi (II)	Attendance: 4,200; Referee: (Switzerland) F. Schorer Interlaken

21 December 1958 Round 13	Basel	0–3	Servette	Landhof, Basel
14:30		Summary	34' (0:1) Steffanina; 35' (0:2) Makay; 64' (0:3) Nemeth	Attendance: 6,500; Referee: (Switzerland) Schüttel Sion

28 December 1958 Round 5	Lugano	0–1	Basel	Cornaredo, Lugano
	Ciani (yellow card) (yellow-red card) 88'	Summary	37' (0:1) Frigerio	Attendance: 3,500; Referee: (Switzerland) Othmar Huber Thun

1 March 1959 Round 14	Basel	1–3	La Chaux-de-Fonds	Landhof, Basel
15:00	Burger 20' (1:1)	Summary	13' (0:1) Pottier; 46' (1:2) Pottier; 29' (1:3) Jaccard	Attendance: 5,500; Referee: (Switzerland) Anton Bucheli Luzern

7 March 1959 Round 15	Grenchen	6–2	Basel	Stadion Brühl, Grenchen
15:00	Glisovic 32' (1:0); Glisovic 52' (2:0); Moser 52' (3:0); Karrer 79' (4:2); Moser 80' (52); Hamel 81' (6:2)	Summary	68' (pen. 3:1) Maurer; 74' (3:2) Stäuble; (yellow card) Burger	Attendance: 2,500; Referee: (Switzerland) Surdez Delémont

15 March 1959 Round 16	Basel	4–0	Lausanne-Sport	Landhof, Basel
15:00	Stäuble 63' (1:0); Stäuble 78' (2:0); Hügi (II) 83' (3:0); Hügi (II) 79' (pen. 4:0)	Summary	(yellow card) Magnin; (yellow card) Monti	Attendance: 5,000; Referee: (Switzerland) W. Müller Baden
Note: Josef Hügi scored his 200th goal for Basel

22 March 1959 Round 17	Chiasso	1–2	Basel	Stadio Via Comacini, Chiasso
	Ferrari 2' (1:0)	Summary	28' (1:1) Stäuble; 40' (1:2) Kohn	Attendance: 1,500; Referee: (Switzerland) D. Mellet Lausanne

5 April 1959 Round 18	Basel	2–2	Lugano	Landhof, Basel
15:00	Hügi (II) 24' (1:1); Stäuble 55' (2:2)	Summary	23' (0:1) Pantellini; 44' (1:2) Frosio	Attendance: 5,800; Referee: (Switzerland) Meister Neuchâtel

12 April 1959 Round 19	Bellinzona	0–0	Basel	Stadio Comunale, Bellinzona
		Summary		Attendance: 1,500; Referee: (Switzerland) W. Müller Baden

3 May 1959 Round 20	Basel	2–2	Luzern	Landhof, Basel
15:00	Kohn 11' (1:0); Kohn 85' (2:2)	Summary	48' (pen. 1:1) Beerli; 71' (1:2) Beerli	Attendance: 5,500; Referee: (Switzerland) Schüttel Sion

10 May 1959 Round 21	Young Boys	1–0	Basel	Wankdorf Stadium, Bern
15:00	Rey 44' (1:0)	Summary		Attendance: 9,000; Referee: (Switzerland) Josef Gulde St. Gallen

24 May 1959 Round 22	Basel	2–1	Zürich	Landhof, Basel
15:00	Stäuble (1:1); Oberer (2:1)	Summary	34' (0:1) Feller	Attendance: 6,000; Referee: (Switzerland) Gino Bergamini Viganello

31 May 1959 Round 23	Grasshopper Club	1–2	Basel	Letzigrund, Zürich
16:00	Scheller 61' (pen. 1:2)	Summary	18' (0:1) Burger; 34' (0:2) Stäuble	Attendance: 8,000; Referee: (Switzerland) Guinnard Gletterens

7 June 1959 Round 24	Basel	5–2	Young Fellows Zürich	Landhof, Basel
15:00	Maurer 1' (pen. 1:0); Oberer 3' (2:0); Kohn 37' (3:2); Maurer 63' (4:2); Hügi (II) 65' (5:2)	Summary	7' (2:1) Buhtz; 18' (2:2) Niggeler	Attendance: 3,500; Referee: (Switzerland) Schwab Neuchâtel

14 June 1959 Round 25	Basel	2–2	Urania Genève Sport	Landhof, Basel
15:00	Stäuble 50' (1:2); Kohn 67' (2:2)	Summary	18' (0:1) Pillon; 33' (0:2) Dufau	Attendance: 4,000; Referee: (Switzerland) W. Müller Baden

21 June 1959 Round 26	Servette	3–4	Basel	Charmilles Stadium, Geneva
	Mauron 26' (1:1); Makay 38' (2:1); Fatton 71' (3:2)	Summary	18' (0:1) Hügi (II); 48' (2:2) Stäuble; 75' (3:3) Burger; 80' (3:4) Hügi (II)	Attendance: 2,000; Referee: (Switzerland) Othmar Huber Thun

==== League table ====
Pos	Team	Pld	W	D	L	GF	GA	GD	Pts	Qualification
1	BSC Young Boys	26	16	6	4	79	42	+37	38	Swiss Champions, qualified for 1958–59 European Cup
2	FC Grenchen	26	12	8	6	57	39	+18	32	Swiss Cup winners
3	FC Zürich	26	14	2	10	55	45	+10	30	
4	Grasshopper Club Zürich	26	12	6	8	63	54	+9	30	
5	Lausanne Sports	26	11	7	8	40	41	−1	29	
6	FC Basel	26	11	5	10	54	48	+6	27	
7	FC La Chaux-de-Fonds	26	8	10	8	44	44	0	26	
8	FC Lucerne	26	8	10	8	40	45	−5	26	
9	Servette FC Genève	26	10	4	12	70	58	+12	24	
10	FC Chiasso	26	10	4	12	48	61	−13	24	
11	FC Lugano	26	6	11	9	27	33	−6	23	
12	AC Bellinzona	26	8	6	12	38	57	−19	22	
13	Urania Genève Sport	26	6	7	13	41	50	−9	19	Relegated
14	Young Fellows Zürich	26	5	4	17	33	72	−39	14	Relegated

Source: rsssf.com

=== Swiss Cup ===
26 October 1958 Round 3	Basel	3–0	Old Boys	Landhof, Basel
15:00	Hügi (II) 11' (1:0); Burger 20' (2:0); Weber (penalty missed) 63′ Hügi (II) 88' (3:0)	Summary		Attendance: 3,500; Referee: (Switzerland) C. Stettler Feuerthalen

30 November 1958 Round 4	Basel	0–2	FC Moutier	Landhof, Basel
14:30		Summary	24' (0:1) Schaffter; 62' (0:2) Heuri	Attendance: 4,000; Referee: (Switzerland) Meister Neuchâtel

== See also ==
- History of FC Basel
- List of FC Basel players
- List of FC Basel seasons

== Sources ==
- Die ersten 125 Jahre. Publisher: Josef Zindel im Friedrich Reinhardt Verlag, Basel. ISBN 978-3-7245-2305-5
- The FCB team 1958–59 at fcb-archiv.ch
- Switzerland 1958–59 by Erik Garin at Rec.Sport.Soccer Statistics Foundation
