= 1956–57 FC Basel season =

FC Basel
1956–57 season
- Chairman: Jules Düblin
- Manager: Béla Sárosi
- Ground: Landhof, Basel
- Top goalscorer: League: Josef Hügi (22); All: Josef Hügi (23)
- Highest home attendance: 12,000 on 18 November 1956 vs BSC Young Boys
- Lowest home attendance: 3,500 on 16 June 1957 vs Young Fellows Zürich
- Average home league attendance: 6,415

The 1956–57 season was Fussball Club Basel 1893's 63rd season in their existence. It was their eleventh consecutive season in the top flight of Swiss football after their promotion from the Nationalliga B in 1945–46. They played their home games in the Landhof, in the Wettstein Quarter in Kleinbasel. Jules Düblin was again the club's chairman. At the AGM he was voted as club chairman for his eleventh successive term.

== Overview ==
The Hungarian ex-international footballer Béla Sárosi who had been hired in as new team manager the previous season continued as coach this season. Basel played a total of 41 games this season. Of these 41 matches 26 were in the domestic league, three matches were in the Swiss Cup and 12 were friendly matches. The friendly games resulted in five victories, two draws and five defeats. In total, including the test games and the cup competition, 21 games were won, seven were drawn and 13 were lost. In their 41 games they scored 78 and conceded 65 goals.

There were fourteen teams contesting the 1956–57 Nationalliga A, these were the top 12 teams from the previous season and the two newly promoted teams Winterthur and Young Fellows Zürich. Again this season, the bottom two teams in the table were to be relegated. Basel won 15 of their 26 games and drew four times and lost seven times. They scored 53 goals and conceded 48. Basel ended the championship with 34 points in 4th position. They were 11 points behind the new champions Young Boys. At the end of the league season, Zürich and Young Fellows Zürich were level with 14 points, joint second last, and therefore they had to play a relegation play-off. Young Fellows won this play-off match and therefore Zürich suffered relegation together with Schaffhausen who had finished in last position.

Josef Hügi was the team's top league goal scorer with 22 goals. He managed three hat-tricks during the league season, in the home match against Zürich (26 August 1956), in the home game against Chiasso (28 October) and in the away game against La Chaux-de-Fonds (3 March 1957). Hügi (II) was third in the league top scorer list, behind Adrien Kauer from La Chaux-de-Fonds with 29 goals and Branislav Vukosavljević from Grasshopper Club who had scored 26 times. Gottlieb Stäuble was the team's second best goal scorer with 10 goals, Peter-Jürgen Sanmann netted eight times and both Hermann Suter and Hansueli Oberer netted six times.

Basel joined the Swiss Cup in the third principal round. They were drawn away against lower tier local team SC Burgdorf and won 1–0. In the fourth round they were drawn away to lower tier Luzern and this ended in a goalless draw after over time. The replay was held at the Landhof but here Basel were knocked out. La Chaux-de-Fonds won the competition.

== Players ==
The following is the list of the Basel first team squad during the season 1956–57. The list includes players that were in the squad on the day that the Nationalliga A season started on 26 August 1956 but subsequently left the club after that date.

Note: Flags indicate national team as defined under FIFA eligibility rules; some limited exceptions apply. Players may hold more than one non-FIFA nationality.

No.	Pos.	Nation	Player
—	GK	SUI	Hansruedi Blatter
—	GK	SUI	Werner Schley
—	DF	SUI	Werner Bopp
—	DF	SUI	Hans-Rudolf Fitze
—	DF	SUI	Hans Hügi (I)
—	DF	SUI	Bruno Michaud (I)
—	MF	SUI	Gustav Borer
—	MF	SUI	Benedikt Frey (from CIBA)
—	MF	FRA	Pierre Redolfi
—	MF	SUI	Rudolf Rickenbacher
—	MF	SUI	Gottlieb Stäuble
—	MF	SUI	Silvan Thüler

No.	Pos.	Nation	Player
—	FW	SUI	Hans Loosli (new)
—	FW	SUI	René Bader
—	FW	SUI	Walter Bannwart
—	FW	SUI	Walter Bielser
—	FW	SUI	Pierre Geiser
—	FW	SUI	Josef Hügi (II)
—	FW	SUI	Ernst Klauser (II) (from Servette)
—	FW	SUI	Bruno Locher (II) (from Kleinhüningen)
—	FW	SUI	Hansueli Oberer
—	FW	GER	Peter-Jürgen Sanmann
—	FW	SUI	Hermann Suter
—	FW	ITA	Romano Zolin

Players who left the squad

Note: Flags indicate national team as defined under FIFA eligibility rules; some limited exceptions apply. Players may hold more than one non-FIFA nationality.

No.	Pos.	Nation	Player
—	GK	SUI	Walter Müller (end of career)
—	DF	SUI	René Klauser (I) (to VfR Verein für Rasenspiele)
—	DF	HUN	György Mogoy (to Nordstern Basel)

No.	Pos.	Nation	Player
—	MF	SUI	Raymond Gilliéron
—	FW	SUI	Rolf Keller (to Servette)
—	FW	GER	Otto Ludwig (to Schaffhausen)

== Results ==
Legend

Win Draw Loss Postponed

=== Friendly matches ===
==== Pre- and mid-season ====
29 July 1956 Pre-season	Basel (Switzerland)	7–3	(Switzerland) Biel-Bienne	Sportplatz, Reinach
16:45	Hügi (II) (1:0); Locher (2:0); Hügi (II) (3:1); Stäuble (4:1); Hügi (II) (5:1); Stäuble (6:1); Stäuble (penalty missed) 50′ Oberer 73' (7:3)	Summary	25' (2:1) Ibach; 47' (6:2) Muster; 49' (6:3) Stramazzo; (penalty missed) 54′ Ibach	Attendance: 2,000; Referee: (Switzerland) Gottfried Dienst, Basel

1 August 1956 Pre-season	VfR Mannheim (Germany)	4–1	(Switzerland) Basel	Nuremberg
	Goal	Summary	Hügi (II)

12 August 1956 Pre-season	La Chaux-de-Fonds (Switzerland)	4–0	(Switzerland) Basel	Brühl, Wettingen
	Pottier 14' (1:0); Kauer 17' (2:0); Kauer 58' (3:0); Morand 73' (4:0)	Summary		Attendance: 3,500; Referee: (Switzerland) W. Rufli Bremgarten
Note: Anniversary game 25 years FC Wettingen

19 August 1956 Pre-season	Basel (Switzerland)	1–2	(Slovakia) ŠK Slovan Bratislava	Landhof, Basel
15:00	Stäuble 41' (1:1)	Summary	34' (0:1) Varga; 73' (1:2) Obert	Attendance: 4,500; Referee: (Switzerland) Othmar Huber Thun

==== Winter break to end of season ====
27 January 1957 Winter break	Basel (Switzerland)	5–2	(Switzerland) Concordia Basel	Landhof, Basel
	Stäuble 15' (1:0); Suter (2:0); Sanmann (3:0); Suter; Stäuble (5:2)	Summary	(3:1) Hosp (4:2) Ferrari	Referee: (Switzerland) K. Keller Basel

9 February 1957 Winter break	Basel (Switzerland)	1–1	(Switzerland) Nordstern Basel	Landhof, Basel
15:00	Hügi (II) 65' (1:0)	Summary	69' (1:1) Burger	Attendance: 2,500; Referee: (Switzerland) Fischlewitz Basel

10 March 1957 Mid-season	FC Olten (Switzerland)	1–1	(Switzerland) Basel	Kleinholz, Olten
	Racheter 7' (1:0)	Summary	45' (1:1) Stäuble	Attendance: 800; Referee: (Switzerland) F. Schorer Interlaken

14 April 1957 Mid-season	Biel-Bienne (Switzerland)	3–0	(Switzerland) Basel	Gurzelen Stadion, Biel/Bienne
	Gaille 32' (1:0); Gaille 65' (2:0); Turin 75' (3:0)	Summary	(penalty missed) Stäuble	Attendance: 500; Referee: (Switzerland) von Wartburg Bern

22 May 1957 Mid-season	Basel (Switzerland)	2–0	(Brazil) EC Bahia	Landhof, Basel
18:30	Oberer (1x); Hügi (II) (1x)	Summary	Penalty missed	Attendance: 7,000; Referee: (Switzerland) W. Rufli Bremgarten

29 May 1957 Mid-season	Basel (Switzerland)	2–1	(France) Olympique Lyonnais	Landhof, Basel
18:00	Hügi (II) 63' (pen. 1:0); Bopp 66' (pen. 2:0)	Summary	80' (2:1) Kneyer	Attendance: 6,500; Referee: (Switzerland) Othmar Huber Thun

4 June 1957 Mid-season	Basel (Switzerland)	2–3	(Germany) Bayern Munich	Landhof, Basel
18:30	Hügi (II) 57' (1:0); Suter 65' (2:1)	Summary	58' (1:1) Hahn; 85' (2:2) Lettl; 88' (2:3) Jobst	Attendance: 3,600; Referee: (Switzerland) Victor Werner Schicker BernL

23 June 1957 End of season	BC Augsburg (Germany)	1–2	(Switzerland) Basel	Rheinpark Stadion, Vaduz
	Goal	Summary	Goal

=== Nationalliga A ===
==== League matches ====
26 August 1956 Round 1	Basel	3–0	Zürich	Landhof, Basel
15:00	Hügi (II) 5' (1:0); Hügi (II) 26' (pen. 2:0); Hügi (II) 49' (3:0)	Summary		Attendance: 6,000; Referee: (Switzerland) Schüttel Sion

2 September 1956 Round 2	Lugano	1–1	Basel	Cornaredo, Lugano
	Bassoli 46' (1:0)	Summary	73' (1:1) Sanmann	Attendance: 4,000; Referee: (Switzerland) Victor Werner Schicker BernD

9 September 1956 Round 3	Basel	4–3	La Chaux-de-Fonds	Landhof, Basel
15:00	Oberer 27' (1:1); Stäuble 39' (2:1); Hügi (II) 58' (3:2); Stäuble 64' (4:2)	Summary	24' (0:1) Kauer; 44' (2:2) Kauer; 71' (4:3) Kauer	Attendance: 7,400; Referee: (Switzerland) W. Rufli Bremgarten

23 September 1956 Round 4	Servette	1–0	Basel	Charmilles Stadium, Geneva
	Coutaz 55' (1:0)	Summary		Attendance: 5,000; Referee: (Switzerland) Paul Wyssling Zürich

30 September 1956 Round 5	Basel	3–2	Winterthur	Landhof, Basel
15:00	Sanmann 24' (1:1); Oberer 58' (2:1); Hügi (II) 78' (pen. 3:1)	Summary	15' (0:1) Brizzi; 80' (3:2) Etterlin	Attendance: 4,000; Referee: (Switzerland) Surdez Delémont

7 October 1956 Round 6	Basel	1–3	Grasshopper Club	Landhof, Basel
15:00	Oberer 19' (1:0)	Summary	39' (o.g. 1:1) Stäuble; 59' (1:2) Ballaman; 87' (1:3) Duret	Attendance: 8,200; Referee: (Switzerland) W. Rufli Bremgarten

14 October 1956 Round 7	Bellinzona	3–1	Basel	Stadio Comunale, Bellinzona
	Capoferri 10' (1:0); Simoni 25' (2:1); Pedrazzoli 51' (3:1)	Summary	12' (1:1) Sanmann	Attendance: 2,800; Referee: (Switzerland) Schüttel Sion

28 October 1956 Round 8	Basel	3–0	Chiasso	Landhof, Basel
15:00	Hügi (II) 30' (pen. 1:0); Hügi (II) 41' (2:0); Hügi (II) 51' (3:0)	Summary		Attendance: 5,500; Referee: (Switzerland) Domeniconi Geneva

4 November 1956 Round 9	Schaffhausen	0–2	Basel	Stadion Breite, Schaffhausen
14:30		Summary	19' (0:1) Stäuble; 68' (0:2) Loosli	Attendance: 2,000; Referee: (Switzerland) D. Mellet Lausanne

18 November 1956 Round 10	Basel	3–4	Young Boys	Landhof, Basel
14:30	Oberer 49' (1:3); Oberer 70' (2:3); Hügi (II) 74' (3:3)	Summary	3' (pen. 0:1) Häuptli; 38' (0:2) Rey; 47' (0:3) Häuptli; 81' (3:4) Meier	Attendance: 12,000; Referee: (Switzerland) F. Buchmüller Zürich

25 November 1956 Round 11	Urania Genève Sport	1–0	Basel	Stade de Frontenex, Geneva
	Pasteuer (penalty missed) 30′ Prod'hom 53' (1:0)	Summary		Attendance: 6,000; Referee: (Switzerland) F. Schorer Interlaken

9 December 1956 Round 12	Basel	1–0	Lausanne-Sport	Landhof, Basel
14:30	Suter 84' (1:0)	Summary		Attendance: 7,800; Referee: (Switzerland) Guinnard Gletterens

16 December 1956 Round 13	Young Fellows Zürich	0–3	Basel	Letzigrund, Zürich
14:45		Summary	48' (0:1) Hügi (II); 51' (0:2) Hügi (II); 87' (0:3) Sanmann	Attendance: 6,000; Referee: (Switzerland) Othmar Huber Thun

17 February 1957 Round 14	Zürich	P – P	Basel	Hardturm, Zürich
		[ Summary]

24 February 1957 Round 15	Basel	3–0	Lugano	Landhof, Basel
15:00	Hügi (II) 49' (1:0); Stäuble 80' (2:0); Suter 82' (3:0)	Summary		Attendance: 2,500; Referee: (Switzerland) Othmar Huber Thun

3 March 1957 Round 16	La Chaux-de-Fonds	2–3	Basel	Stade Charrière, La Chaux-de-Fonds
15:00	Mauron 22' (0:1); Morand (1:2); Kauer (penalty missed) 88′	Summary	(1:1) Hügi (II); 61' (2:2) Hügi (II); (penalty missed) 68′ Hügi (II); 75' (2:3) Hügi (II)	Attendance: 4,000; Referee: (Switzerland) Josef Gulde St. Gallen

17 March 1957 Round 17	Basel	0–0	Servette	Landhof, Basel
15:00		Summary		Attendance: 9,000; Referee: (Switzerland) E. Guidi Bellinzona

24 March 1957 Round 18	Winterthur	0–1	Basel	Schützenwiese, Winterthur
15:00		Summary	52' (0:1) Stäuble	Attendance: 6,600; Referee: (Switzerland) F. Schorer Interlaken

31 March 1957 Round 19	Grasshopper Club	1–0	Basel	Hardturm, Zürich
15:00	Winterhofen 55' (1:0)	Summary		Attendance: 10,000; Referee: (Switzerland) Domeniconi Geneva

7 April 1957 Round 20	Basel	3–1	Bellinzona	Landhof, Basel
15:00	Hügi (II) 14' (1:0); Sanmann 18' (2:0); Sanmann 25' (3:0)	Summary	53' (3:1) Capoferri	Attendance: 5,000; Referee: (Switzerland) D. Mellet Lausanne

28 April 1957 Round 21	Chiasso	P – P	Basel	Stadio Via Comacini, Chiasso
		[ Summary]

1 May 1957 Round 22	Basel	4–1	Schaffhausen	Landhof, Basel
17:00	Stäuble 22' (1:0); Hügi (II) 29' (2:0); Sanmann 31' (3:0); Hügi (II) 73' (4:0)	Summary	76' (pen. 4:1) Züfle	Attendance: 4,500; Referee: (Switzerland) F. Schorer Interlaken

5 May 1957 Round 21	Chiasso	1–1	Basel	Stadio Via Comacini, Chiasso
	Laurito 35' (1:0)	Summary	73' (1:1) Stäuble	Attendance: 1,000; Referee: (Switzerland) D. Mellet Lausanne

12 May 1957 Round 23	Young Boys	2–2	Basel	Wankdorf Stadium, Bern
15:00	Grütter 6' (1:0); Rey (2:0)	Summary	73' (2:1) Suter; 75' (2:2) Hügi (II)	Attendance: 9,000; Referee: (Switzerland) Paul Wyssling Zürich

15 May 1957 Round 14	Zürich	3–5	Basel	Hardturm, Zürich
20:15	Feller 17' (1:2); Poncioni 74' (2:5); Feller 89' (3:5)	Summary	5' (0:1) Suter; 15' (0:2) Stäuble; 30' (1:3) Sanmann; 58' (1:4) Oberer; 66' (1:5) Hügi (II)	Attendance: 3,000; Referee: (Switzerland) Othmar Huber Thun

26 May 1957 Round 24	Basel	2–1	Urania Genève Sport	Landhof, Basel
15:00	Hügi (II) 26' (1:0); Stäuble 53' (2:1)	Summary	38' (1:1) Vincent	Attendance: 8,000; Referee: (Switzerland) Guillet Yverdon

2 June 1957 Round 25	Lausanne-Sport	7–1	Basel	Olympique de la Pontaise, Lausanne
15:00	Maillard 30' (1:0); Tedeschi 60' (2:1); Vonlanden 62' (3:1); Maillard 63' (4:1); Tedeschi 74' (5:1); Vonlanden 80' (6:1); Maillard 83' (7:1)	Summary	55' (1:1) Suter	Attendance: 3,500; Referee: (Switzerland) Josef Gulde St. Gallen

16 June 1957 Round 26	Basel	3–1	Young Fellows Zürich	Landhof, Basel
15:00	Suter 36' (1:0); Stäuble 41' (2:0); Hügi (II) 77' (3:0)	Summary	(3:1) Bossi	Attendance: 3,500; Referee: (Switzerland) Victor Werner Schicker Bern

==== League table ====
Pos	Team	Pld	W	D	L	GF	GA	GD	Pts	Qualification
1	Young Boys	26	21	3	2	76	22	+54	45	Swiss Champions
2	Grasshopper Club	26	19	3	4	82	30	+52	41	
3	La Chaux-de-Fonds	26	17	4	5	87	35	+52	38	Swiss Cup winners
4	Basel	26	15	4	7	53	38	+15	34	
5	Urania Genève Sport	26	12	6	8	38	34	+4	30	
6	Bellinzona	26	10	8	8	37	42	−5	28	
7	Lausanne-Sport	26	11	5	10	44	37	+7	27	
8	Servette	26	9	8	9	40	44	−4	26	
9	Chiasso	26	10	5	11	46	62	−16	25	
10	Lugano	26	6	5	15	39	51	−12	17	
11	Winterthur	26	6	4	16	43	67	−24	16	
12	Young Fellows Zürich	26	4	6	16	30	67	−37	14	Play-off winners, remain in Nationalliga A
13	Zürich	26	5	4	17	34	61	−27	14	Play-off losers, relegated to Nationalliga B
14	Schaffhausen	26	1	7	18	26	85	−59	9	Relegated to Nationalliga B

Source: rsssf.com

=== Swiss Cup ===
21 October 1956 Round 3	SC Burgdorf	0–1	Basel	Neumatt, Burgdorf
15:00	Probst (penalty missed) 32′	Summary	(red card) 75' Bielser; 86' (0:1) Hügi (II)	Attendance: 2,600; Referee: (Switzerland) Peccorini Geneva

2 December 1956 Round 4	Luzern	0–0 (a.e.t.)	Basel	Stadion Allmend, Luzern
		Summary		Attendance: 4,600; Referee: (Switzerland)

23 December 1956 Round 4 replay	Basel	0–2	Luzern	Landhof, Basel
14:30		Summary	63' (o.g. 0:1) Thüler; 80' (0:2)	Attendance: 4,500; Referee: (Switzerland) Victor Werner Schicker Bern

== See also ==
- History of FC Basel
- List of FC Basel players
- List of FC Basel seasons

== Sources ==
- Die ersten 125 Jahre. Publisher: Josef Zindel im Friedrich Reinhardt Verlag, Basel. ISBN 978-3-7245-2305-5
- The FCB team 1956–57 at fcb-archiv.ch
- Switzerland 1956–57 by Erik Garin at Rec.Sport.Soccer Statistics Foundation
