= 1955–56 FC Basel season =

FC Basel
1955–56 season
- Chairman: Jules Düblin
- Manager: Béla Sárosi
- Ground: Landhof, Basel
- Top goalscorer: League: Josef Hügi (14); All: Josef Hügi (18)
- Highest home attendance: 10,000 on 11 December 1955 vs La Chaux-de-Fonds and on 13 May 1956 vs Grasshopper Club
- Lowest home attendance: 3,800 on 10 June 1956 vs Fribourg
- Average home league attendance: 6,630

The 1955–56 season was Fussball Club Basel 1893's 62nd season in their existence. It was their tenth consecutive season in the top flight of Swiss football after their promotion from the Nationalliga B the season 1945–46. They played their home games in the Landhof, in the Wettstein Quarter in Kleinbasel. Jules Düblin was the club's chairman. It was his tenth successive season as chairman.

== Overview ==
During the previous four or five years the number of players joining and leaving the club was increasing considerably. The other Swiss clubs politics of buying new players was increasing strongly and transfer fees rose rapidly in this period. Basel, under the leadership of Jules Düblin, were trying to stay clear of this transfer trading. But because at the beginning of the previous season they had lost important players, such as goalkeeper Gianfranco de Taddeo to Cantonal Neuchatel, midfielder Kurt Maurer to La Chaux-de-Fonds and striker Walter Bielser to Biel-Bienne, the Basel board of directors were changing their approach to the subject. Düblin explained the situation at the AGM and the club members gave him the rights to strengthen the team. Béla Sárosi was hired as new team manager. Various transfers were made, Werner Schley returned from Grasshopper Club, Gottlieb Stäuble returned from Lausanne-Sport, Walter Bielser returned from Biel-Bienne, Silvan Thüler was hired from Solothurn and Peter-Jürgen Sanmann was hired from Concordia Hamburg. The exact amount that this all cost is not recorded, but the club needed to take up credits, one of which came from the city of Basel over the amount of 30,000 Swiss Francs.

As mentioned Béla Sárosi was hired in as new team manager. The Hungarian ex-international footballer had been team manager by Lugano the previous two seasons. He replaced René Bader who continued as player. There were fourteen teams contesting in the 1955–56 Nationalliga A, these were the top 12 teams from the previous season and the two newly promoted teams Urania Genève Sport and FC Schaffhausen. Again this season, the bottom two teams in the table were to be relegated. Basel won 10 of their 26 games and drew six times and lost 10 times. They scored 47 goals and conceded 50. Basel ended the championship with 26 points in 7th position. They were 16 points behind new champions Grasshopper Club. Grenchen and Fribourg suffered relegation.

Josef Hügi was again Basel's top league goal scorer with 14 goals and he was joint seventh league top scorer behind Branislav Vukosavljević from Grasshopper Club who had scored 33 times. Gottlieb Stäuble was Basel's second best goal scorer with 13 goals and joint ninth league top scorer. Further, Peter-Jürgen Sanmann netted six times. Four goals in one match could be noted for Hügi on 10 June 1956 and also a hat-trick for Sanmann in the same game as Basel won 9–1 against Fribourg. This was seen by only 3,800 supporters, Basel's lowest home attendance that season.

Basel joined the Swiss Cup in the third principal round. They were drawn away against lower tier local team SC Binningen, but because they waived the home advantage the match was played at the Landhof and Basel won 5–0. Rolf Keller scored a hat-trick in this game. In the fourth round they were drawn at home to lower tier FC Emmenbrücke and Basel won 6–2. Josef Hügi scored a hat-trick in this game. In the fifth round Basel were drawn at home to Biel-Bienne. Gottlieb Stäuble scored a hat-trick and Basel won 7–3. In the quarter-finals basel were drawn away against Cantonal Neuchatel, but here they were knocked out of the competition.

== Players ==
The following is the list of the Basel first team squad during the season 1955–56. The list includes players that were in the squad on the day that the Nationalliga A season started on 28 August 1955 but subsequently left the club after that date.

Note: Flags indicate national team as defined under FIFA eligibility rules; some limited exceptions apply. Players may hold more than one non-FIFA nationality.

| No. | Pos. | Nation | Player |
|---|---|---|---|
| — | GK | SUI | Hansruedi Blatter |
| — | GK | SUI | Walter Müller |
| — | GK | SUI | Werner Schley (from Grasshopper Club) |
| — | DF | SUI | Werner Bopp |
| — | DF | SUI | Hans-Rudolf Fitze |
| — | DF | SUI | Hans Hügi (I) |
| — | DF | SUI | René Klauser (I) |
| — | DF | SUI | Bruno Michaud (I) |
| — | DF | HUN | György Mogoy |
| — | MF | SUI | Gustav Borer |
| — | MF | SUI | Raymond Gilliéron (from Brühl St. Gallen) |
| — | MF | FRA | Pierre Redolfi |

| No. | Pos. | Nation | Player |
|---|---|---|---|
| — | MF | SUI | Rudolf Rickenbacher (from Nordstern Basel) |
| — | MF | SUI | Gottlieb Stäuble (from Lausanne-Sport) |
| — | MF | SUI | Silvan Thüler (from Solothurn) |
| — | FW | SUI | René Bader |
| — | FW | SUI | Walter Bannwart |
| — | FW | SUI | Walter Bielser (from Biel-Bienne) |
| — | FW | SUI | Pierre Geiser |
| — | FW | SUI | Josef Hügi (II) |
| — | FW | SUI | Rolf Keller |
| — | FW | GER | Otto Ludwig |
| — | FW | SUI | Hansueli Oberer |
| — | FW | GER | Peter-Jürgen Sanmann (from Concordia Hamburg) |
| — | FW | ITA | Romano Zolin |

Players who left the squad

Note: Flags indicate national team as defined under FIFA eligibility rules; some limited exceptions apply. Players may hold more than one non-FIFA nationality.

| No. | Pos. | Nation | Player |
|---|---|---|---|
| — | DF | SUI | Hans Weber (to Lausanne-Sport) |
| — | MF | SUI | Eugen Büchel |
| — | MF | SUI | Albert Haug (to Zürich) |
| — | MF | SUI | Luciano Merlini (to SC Burgdorf) |
| — | MF | ESP | Juan Monros (to Urania Genève Sport) |

| No. | Pos. | Nation | Player |
|---|---|---|---|
| — | MF | SUI | Kurt Thalmann |
| — | FW | SUI | Ernst Klauser (II) |
| — | FW | SUI | Hans-Peter Schär |
| — | | SUI | Alfred Hartmann |
| — | | SUI | Hans Jordi |

== Results ==
Legend

Win Draw Loss Postponed

=== Friendly matches ===
==== Pre-season and mid-season ====
| 7 August 1955 Pre-season | Grenchen (Switzerland) | 1–1 | (Switzerland) Basel | Stadion Brügglifeld, Aarau |
| | Sidler (1:0) | Summary | (1:1) Hügi (II) | Attendance: 1,200; Referee: (Switzerland) Weiersmüller Suhr |

| 14 August 1955 Pre-season | Basel (Switzerland) | 2–2 | (Switzerland) Solothurn | Landhof, Basel |
| 15:00 | Bannwart (1:0); Oberer (2:1) | Summary | 38' (1:1) Mollet; 75' (2:2) Adam | Attendance: 2,400; Referee: (Switzerland) M. Schreiber Reinach |
Note: Transfer game for Silvan Thüler

| 20 August 1955 Pre-season | Hamburger SV (Germany) | 2–1 | (Switzerland) Basel | Hamburg |
| | Uwe Seeler 25' (1:0); Dieter Seeler 53' (2:0) | Summary | 80' (2:1) Hügi (II) | Attendance: 5,000 |

| 20 November 1955 Mid-season | Basel (Switzerland) | 1–3 | (Russia) Torpedo Moscow | St. Jakob Stadium, Basel |
| 14:45 | Oberer 33' (1:1) | Summary | 18' (0:1) Falin; 65' (1:2) Arbutow; 86' (1:3) Streltsov | Attendance: 18,000; Referee: (Switzerland) Victor Werner Schicker Bern |

| 5 February 1956 Winter break | Urania Genève Sport (Switzerland) | 2–0 | (Switzerland) Basel | Stade de Frontenex, Geneva |
| | Bernasconi 42' (1:0); Monros 87' (2:0) | Summary | | Attendance: 900; Referee: (Switzerland) M. Tasca Geneva |

==== Winter break to end of season ====
| 5 February 1956 Winter break | Urania Genève Sport (Switzerland) | 2–0 | (Switzerland) Basel | Stade de Frontenex, Geneva |
| | Bernasconi 42' (1:0); Monros 87' (2:0) | Summary | | Attendance: 900; Referee: (Switzerland) M. Tasca Geneva |

| 11 February 1956 Winter break | Basel (Switzerland) | 3–2 | (Germany) SC Concordia | Landhof, Basel |
| 15:00 | Stäuble (2x); Bielser (1x) | Summary | (1x) Schmitt (1x) Woiters | Attendance: 400; Referee: (Switzerland) M. Schreiber Reinach |

| 30 May 1956 Mid-season | Basel (Switzerland) | 2–1 | (Scotland) Hibernian | Landhof, Basel |
| 18:30 | Stäuble 58' (1:1); Hügi (II) 85' (pen. 2:1) | Summary | 44' (0:1) Frye | Attendance: 4,500; Referee: (Switzerland) Othmar Huber Thun |

| 1 July 1956 End of season | South Baden XI (Germany) | 1–5 | (Switzerland) Basel | Eichwald-Stadion, Müllheim |
| | Zeller 25' (1:2) | Summary | 13' (0:1) Hügi (II); 15' (0:2) Hügi (II); 30' (1:3) Bannwart; 68' (1:4) Hügi (II); 73' (1:5) Hügi (II) | Referee: (Germany) Klöss |

=== Nationalliga A ===
==== League matches ====
| 28 August 1955 Round 1 | Chiasso | 2–0 | Basel | Stadio Via Comacini, Chiasso |
| | Oberer 51' (pen. 1:0); Ferrari 52' (2:0) | Summary | | Attendance: 1,300; Referee: (Switzerland) von Gunten Bern |

| 4 September 1955 Round 2 | Basel | 3–2 | Zürich | Landhof, Basel |
| 17:00 | Thüler 37' (1:2); Hügi (II) 56' (pen. 2:2); Bielser 69' (3:2) | Summary | 17' (0:1) Marta; 18' (0:2) Bruppacher | Attendance: 5,300; Referee: (Switzerland) Zutter Bern |

| 11 September 1955 Round 3 | Schaffhausen | 2–2 | Basel | Stadion Breite, Schaffhausen |
| 15:00 | Akeret 57' (1:0); Akeret 72' (2:2) | Summary | 60' (1:1) Sanmann; 67' (1:2) Hügi (II) | Attendance: 6,000; Referee: (Switzerland) Schönholzer Lausanne |

| 25 September 1955 Round 4 | Basel | 3–0 | Urania Genève Sport | Landhof, Basel |
| 15:00 | Hügi (II) 53' (1:0); Bannwart 56' (2:0); Stäuble 88' (3:0) | Summary | | Attendance: 6,000; Referee: (Switzerland) Victor Werner Schicker Bern |
Note: Minute of commemoration for the late FCB co-founder Josy Ebinger.

| 2 October 1955 Round 5 | Lausanne-Sport | 0–1 | Basel | Olympique de la Pontaise, Lausanne |
| 15:00 | | Summary | 3' (0:1) Hügi (II) | Attendance: 5,500; Referee: (Switzerland) W. Werner St. Gallen |

| 16 October 1955 Round 6 | Basel | 2–2 | Young Boys | Landhof, Basel |
| 15:00 | Stäuble 31' (1:1); Thüler 73' (2:1) | Summary | 9' (0:1) Bähler; 87' (2:2) Bopp | Attendance: 7,500; Referee: (Switzerland) E. Guidi Bellinzona |

| 23 October 1955 Round 7 | Bellinzona | 2–0 | Basel | Stadio Comunale, Bellinzona |
| | Villa 4' (1:0); Sartori (2:0) | Summary | (penalty missed) 42′ Hügi (II) | Attendance: 1,800; Referee: (Switzerland) Josef Gulde St. Gallen |

| 30 October 1955 Round 8 | Basel | 3–2 | Lugano | Landhof, Basel |
| 15:00 | Stäuble 10' (1:0); Bielser 17' (2:1); Hügi (II) | Summary | 13' (1:1) Pozzi; 52' (2:2) Pozzi; (yellow card) Bartesaghi | Attendance: 6,800; Referee: (Switzerland) D. Mellet Lausanne |

| 6 November 1955 Round 9 | Grasshopper Club | 4–2 | Basel | Hardturm, Zürich |
| 14:45 | Vukosavljević 25' (1:0); Ballaman 31' (2:0); Hüssy 38' (3:0); Vukosavljević 80' (4:2) | Summary | 47' (3:1) Bannwart; 53' (3:2) Stäuble; (yellow card) Mogoy | Attendance: 11,500; Referee: (Switzerland) Victor Werner Schicker Bern |

| 13 November 1955 Round 10 | Basel | 4–2 | Grenchen | Landhof, Basel |
| 14:30 | Stäuble 46' (1:2); Stäuble 59' (2:2); Thüler 72' (3:2); Hügi (II) 81' (4:2) | Summary | 41' (0:1) Sidler; 43' (pen. 0:2) Morf | Attendance: 5,000; Referee: (Switzerland) Gino Bergamini Viganello |

| 27 November 1955 Round 11 | Servette | 3–0 | Basel | Charmilles Stadium, Geneva |
| 14:30 | Anker 30' (1:0); Pasteur 75' (2:0); Anker 85' (3:0) | Summary | | Attendance: 7,000; Referee: (Switzerland) E. Guidi Bellinzona |

| 4 December 1955 Round 12 | Fribourg | 1–0 | Basel | Stade Universitaire Saint-Léonard |
| | Kaeslin 40' (1:0) | Summary | | Attendance: 3,000; Referee: (Switzerland) W. Rufli Bremgarten |

| 11 December 1955 Round 13 | Basel | 2–0 | La Chaux-de-Fonds | Landhof, Basel |
| 14:30 | Stäuble 41' (1:0); Bielser (2:0) | Summary | | Attendance: 10,000; Referee: (Switzerland) F. Buchmüller Zürich |

| 26 February 1956 Round 14 | Basel | P – P | Chiasso | Landhof, Basel |
| | | [ Summary] |

| 4 March 1956 Round 15 | Zürich | 1–1 | Basel | Letzigrund, Zürich |
| 15:00 | Leimgruber 54' (1:0) | Summary | 70' (1:1) Oberer | Attendance: 5,000; Referee: (Switzerland) Gino Bergamini Viganello |

| 15 March 1955 Round 16 | Basel | 1–0 | Schaffhausen | Landhof, Basel |
| 15:00 | Stäuble 27' (1:0) | Summary | | Attendance: 6,500; Referee: (Switzerland) Josef Gulde St. Gallen |

| 25 March 1956 Round 17 | Urania Genève Sport | 2–0 | Basel | Stade de Frontenex, Geneva |
| | Chodat 60' (1:0); Mezzena 87' (pen. 2:0) | Summary | | Attendance: 4,200; Referee: (Switzerland) F. Schorer Interlaken |

| 8 April 1956 Round 18 | Basel | 2–1 | Lausanne-Sport | Landhof, Basel |
| 15:00 | Hügi (II) 4' (1:0); Hügi (II) 19' (2:1) | Summary | 13' (1:1) Poma | Attendance: 8,000; Referee: (Switzerland) Othmar Huber Thun |

| 15 April 1956 Round 19 | Young Boys | 4–1 | Basel | Wankdorf Stadium, Bern |
| 15:00 | Grütter 7' (1:0); Scheller 8' (2:0); Hamel 12' (3:0); Scheller 68' (4:1) | Summary | 14' (3:1) Stäuble | Attendance: 11,000; Referee: (Switzerland) Gino Bergamini Viganello |

| 22 April 1956 Round 14 | Basel | 2–1 | Chiasso | Landhof, Basel |
| 15:00 | Sanmann 23' (1:0); Hügi (II) 60' (2:0) | Summary | 68' (2:1) Chiesa | Attendance: 7,500; Referee: (Switzerland) Schönholzer Lausanne |

| 28 April 1956 Round 20 | Basel | 2–2 | Bellinzona | Landhof, Basel |
| 15:00 | Thüler (penalty missed) 27′ Stäuble 45' (1:0); Stäuble 84' (2:2) | Summary | 48' (1:1) Capoferri; 77' (1:2) Capoferri | Attendance: 5,000; Referee: (Switzerland) Zutter Bern |

| 6 May 1956 Round 21 | Lugano | P – P | Basel | Cornaredo, Lugano |
| | | [ Summary] |

| 13 May 1956 Round 22 | Basel | 2–5 | Grasshopper Club | Landhof, Basel |
| 15:00 | Bielser 47' (1:3); Stäuble 75' (2:3) | Summary | 3' (pen. 0:1) Vukosavljević; 39' (0:2) Ballaman; 41' (0:3) Hagen; 85' (2:4) Vukosavljević; 88' (2:5) Hagen | Attendance: 10,000; Referee: (Switzerland) Fr. Karlen Bern |

| 20 May 1956 Round 21 | Lugano | 0–0 | Basel | Cornaredo, Lugano |
| | | Summary | | Attendance: 2,500; Referee: (Switzerland) Josef Gulde St. Gallen |

| 27 May 1956 Round 23 | Grenchen | 4–2 | Basel | Stadion Brühl, Grenchen |
| 15:30 | Moser 11' (1:0); Raboud (I) 12' (2:0); Sidler 44' (3:0); Sidler 84' (4:2) | Summary | 65' (o.g. 3:1) Campoleoni; 78' (3:2) Bannwart | Attendance: 3,000; Referee: (Switzerland) D. Mellet Lausanne |

| 3 June 1956 Round 24 | Basel | 1–1 | Servette | Landhof, Basel |
| 15:00 | Hügi (II) 73' (1:1) | Summary | 35' (0:1) Anker | Attendance: 4,800; Referee: (Switzerland) F. Buchmüller Zürich |

| 10 June 1956 Round 25 | Basel | 9–1 | Fribourg | Landhof, Basel |
| 15:00 | Hügi (II) 28' (1:0); Sanmann 38' (2:0); Hügi (II) 42' (3:0); Monti 47' (o.g. 4:0); Stäuble 58' (5:0); Hügi (II) 59' (6:0); Sanmann 63' (7:0); Hügi (II) 80' (8:0); Sanmann 81' (9:0); Geiser (penalty missed) 90′ | Summary | 90' (9:1) Schmutz | Attendance: 3,800; Referee: (Switzerland) Victor Werner Schicker Bern |

| 16 June 1956 Round 26 | La Chaux-de-Fonds | 6–2 | Basel | Stade Charrière, La Chaux-de-Fonds |
| 17:30 | Mauron 24' (1:1); Antenen 33' (2:1); Kauer 49' (3:2); Mauron 73' (4:2); Antenen 87' (pen. 5:2); Mauron 88' (6:2) | Summary | 20' (0:1) Geiser; 49' (2:2) Sanmann | Attendance: 3,000; Referee: (Switzerland) E. Guidi Bellinzona |

==== League table ====
| Pos | Team | Pld | W | D | L | GF | GA | GD | Pts | Qualification |
|---|---|---|---|---|---|---|---|---|---|---|
| 1 | Grasshopper Club | 26 | 19 | 4 | 3 | 94 | 36 | +58 | 42 | Champions and Swiss Cup winners |
| 2 | La Chaux-de-Fonds | 26 | 14 | 6 | 6 | 65 | 46 | +19 | 34 | |
| 3 | Young Boys | 26 | 12 | 8 | 6 | 60 | 41 | +19 | 32 | |
| 4 | Servette | 26 | 12 | 6 | 8 | 53 | 51 | +2 | 30 | |
| 5 | Bellinzona | 26 | 11 | 6 | 9 | 39 | 45 | −6 | 28 | |
| 6 | Chiasso | 26 | 12 | 3 | 11 | 48 | 47 | +1 | 27 | |
| 7 | Basel | 26 | 10 | 6 | 10 | 47 | 50 | −3 | 26 | |
| 8 | Lausanne-Sport | 26 | 10 | 5 | 11 | 40 | 50 | −10 | 25 | |
| 9 | Lugano | 26 | 7 | 9 | 10 | 38 | 46 | −8 | 23 | |
| 10 | Schaffhausen | 26 | 7 | 8 | 11 | 30 | 44 | −14 | 22 | |
| 11 | Urania Genève Sport | 26 | 8 | 6 | 12 | 34 | 51 | −17 | 22 | |
| 12 | Zürich | 26 | 8 | 5 | 13 | 55 | 53 | +2 | 21 | |
| 13 | Grenchen | 26 | 7 | 4 | 15 | 39 | 55 | −16 | 18 | Relegated |
| 14 | Fribourg | 26 | 5 | 4 | 17 | 32 | 59 | −27 | 14 | Relegated |

Source: rsssf.com

=== Swiss Cup ===
| 19 November 1955 Round 3 | SC Binningen | 0–5 | Basel | Landhof, Basel |
| | | Summary | 23' (0:1) Keller; 27' (pen. 0:2) Thüler; 58' (0:3) Sanmann; 72' (0:4) Keller; 82' (pen. 0:5) | Attendance: 1,000; Referee: (Switzerland) F. Schorer Interlaken |
Note: SC Binningen waived the home advantage

| 18 December 1955 Round 4 | Basel | 6–2 | FC Emmenbrücke | Landhof, Basel |
| 14:30 | Oberer (1:2); Hügi (II) 31' (2:2); Hügi (II) 63' (3:2); Stäuble 64' (4:2); Bielser 83' (5:2); Hügi (II) 80' (6:2) | Summary | (0:1) Kehl; 23' (0:2) Steffen | Attendance: 2,300; Referee: (Switzerland) Weiersmüller Suhr |

| 19 February 1956 Round 5 | Basel | 7–3 | Biel-Bienne | Landhof, Basel |
| 14:30 | Stäuble 2' (1:0); Stäuble 38' (2:3); Thüler (pen. 3:3); Sanmann 48' (4:3); Hügi (II) 70' (5:3); Sanmann 74' (6:3); Stäuble 80' (7:3) | Summary | 18' (1:1) Kohler; 23' (1:2) Riederer; 33' (1:3) Allemann | Attendance: 1,500; Referee: (Switzerland) Surdez Delémont |

| 2 April 1956 Quarter-final | Cantonal Neuchatel | 1–0 | Basel | Stade de la Maladière (1924), Neuchâtel |
| 15:00 | Lanz 85' (1:0) | Summary | | Attendance: 6,000; Referee: (Switzerland) F. Buchmüller Zürich |

== See also ==
- History of FC Basel
- List of FC Basel players
- List of FC Basel seasons

== Sources ==
- Die ersten 125 Jahre. Publisher: Josef Zindel im Friedrich Reinhardt Verlag, Basel. ISBN 978-3-7245-2305-5
- The FCB team 1955–56 at fcb-archiv.ch
- Switzerland 1955–56 by Erik Garin at Rec.Sport.Soccer Statistics Foundation
