= Gottlieb Stäuble =

Swiss footballer (1929-2015)

Godi Stäuble
Personal information
- Full name: Gottlieb Stäuble
- Date of birth: 27 April 1929
- Place of birth: Basel, Switzerland
- Date of death: 24 April 2015 (aged 85)
- Place of death: Basel, Switzerland
- Positions: Midfielder; forward

Youth career
- –1946: FC Basel

Senior career*
Years	Team	Apps	(Gls)
1946–1951	FC Basel	86	(37)
1951–1953	BSC Young Boys	29	(6)
1953–1955	Lausanne-Sport	50	(20)
1955–1959	FC Basel	99	(44)
1959–1963	Biel-Bienne	100	(27)
1963–1965	FC Bern	42	(11)
1965–1967	Biel-Bienne	26	(10)

International career
1950–1951	Switzerland	1	(0)
- * Club domestic league appearances and goals

Gottlieb "Godi" Stäuble (27 April 1929 – 24 April 2015) was a Swiss footballer who played in the late 1940s, 1950s and 1960s. He played mainly as a midfielder but also as a forward.

== Club career ==
Just 17 years old Stäuble joined Basel's first team during the 1946–47 season, but he did not play in any first team matches that season. It seems that he played with the youth or the reserve team. In the next season, as Ernst Hufschmid took over as player-coach following head coach Anton Schall death, Stäuble was given his chance. First he played a test match with the team against local rivals Nordstern Basel on 24 August 1947. Basel won the game 2–0 and Stäuble netted both goals. He played his domestic league debut for the club in the away game on 31 August as Basel drew 1–1 with Servette. He scored his first competition goal for his club in the Swiss Cup on 26 October that year in the home game at the Landhof against SC Balerna, in fact he scored two goals, as Basel won 7–0. Stäuble scored his first domestic league goal for his club on 22 February 1948 in the home game against Servette as Basel won 3–2 and it was the winning goal of the match. Stäuble played 21 league games for his club in his first season as player and scored eight league goals. In league and cup he was the team's second best scorer with 10 goals behind Paul Stöcklin who had managed 11.

In Basel's 1948–49 season Stäuble played 23 league games and three in the Cup and scored ten goals in total. Behind Hans Hügi who netted 14 times, Stäuble was again the team's second best scorer and was 20th position under the league's top scorers. In the league match on 29 May 1949 he scored his first hat-trick. The following season 1949–50 Stäuble played 25 league games and with 13 goals was the team's best scorer and 8th best league scorer.

Stäuble played with Basel until the end of the 1950–51 Nationalliga A season. That season he played 17 league matches and scored seven goals. In the 3rd principal round of the Swiss Cup on 29 October 1950 in the away match against FC Münchenstein he scored his first hat-trick in this competition.

During the summer break 1951 Stäuble joined BSC Young Boys, where he stayed for two seasons. Then he joined Lausanne-Sport, where he also stayed two seasons.

Then during the summer of 1955 Stäuble rejoined his club of origin. This was the period in which the club, under chairman Jules Düblin, started employing more semi-professional players and paying larger sums for the transfers of new players, because the team was playing in the lower midfield of the domestic league and were in danger of relegation. Together with the new trainer Béla Sárosi (FC Lugano) and new players such as Silvan Thüler (FC Solothurn) and Peter-Jürgen Sanmann (Concordia Hamburg), Stäuble was to help improve the team's situation. Indeed, he fitted in well with striker colleague Josef "Seppe" Hügi. Hügi scored 19 times during the 1955–56 season and Stäuble 18, together they scored more than half of the team's goals. However, in the four years in his second period with the club, they never rose above fourth position in the table.

Between the years 1946 and 1951, and again from 1955 to 1959 Stäuble played a total of 286 games for Basel scoring a total of 123 goals. 185 of these games were in the Nationalliga A, 23 in the Swiss Cup and 78 were friendly games. He scored 81 goals in the domestic league, 13 in the Swiss Cup and the other 29 were scored during the test games.

Following his time with Basel, Stäuble moved on to play for Biel-Bienne. He stayed with them, apart from a short period with FC Bern, until the end of his active football career.

== International career ==
Stäuble was called up for the Swiss national team in the 1950–51 season. However, his only short appearance for them was for 15 minutes as he was substituted in for Hans-Peter Friedländer in October 1950 in front of almost 24,000 spectators in the Stadion Rankhof in Basel during a friendly against the Netherlands for the last quarter of an hour. He helped his FC Basel teammate René Bader to complete the Swiss 7–5 victory.

== Private life ==
After his career as an active footballer Stäuble returned to his home town Basel. As a trained businessman, he worked 30 years for the Cardinal Brewery in Rheinfelden. Stäuble was married twice. Together with his first wife Angelina they had two daughters. His younger daughter Claudine Stäuble also entered into top-class sport. She played handball with the then series champions ATV Basel-Stadt. She won four Swiss titles with them in the Spar Premium League. Three days before his 86th birthday, Gottlieb “Godi” Stäuble died at home in Basel on 24 April 2015.

== Sources ==
- Josef Zindel (2018). FC Basel 1893. Die ersten 125 Jahre (in German). Basel: Friedrich Reinhardt Verlag. ISBN 978-3-7245-2305-5.
- Verein "Basler Fussballarchiv" Homepage
