= Loosli =

Loosli is a Swiss German surname. Notable people with the surname include:

- Carl Albert Loosli (1877–1959), Swiss writer
- David Loosli (born 1980), Swiss cyclist
- Hans Loosli, Swiss footballer
- Noah Loosli (born 1997), Swiss footballer
- Walter Loosli (1932–2015), Swiss sculptor and artist
