= Benjamin Nadjem =

German-born Afghan footballer

Personal information
- Full name: Ali Benjamin Nadjem
- Date of birth: 2 April 1995 (age 31)
- Place of birth: Kabul, Afghanistan
- Height: 1.65 m (5 ft 5 in)
- Position: Right-back

Youth career
- –2012: SC Concordia
- 2012–2014: FC St. Pauli

Senior career*
Years	Team	Apps	(Gls)
2014–2018	FC St. Pauli II	97	(0)
2018–2019	TSV Sasel	24	(3)
2019	Drochtersen/Assel	7	(0)
2020	Meiendorfer SV	2	(0)

International career^{‡}
2017–2019	Afghanistan	9	(0)
- * Club domestic league appearances and goals as of 14:15, 4 April 2020 (UTC) ‡ National team caps and goals as of 09:45, 26 January 2022 (UTC)

Ali Benjamin Nadjem (Dari: علی بنیامین نجم; born 2 April 1995) is a footballer who plays as a right-back. Born in Afghanistan and raised in Germany, he has represented the Afghanistan national team at international level.

== Youth career ==
Nadjem began his youth career with SC Concordia. Nadjem played also in the youth of FC St. Pauli before making his debut for the second team of St. Pauli.

== Club career ==
=== FC St. Pauli II ===
Nadjem played three games in the 2013–14 season with FC St. Pauli II. In his second season he became a regular starter for the team and played 24 games and received 3 yellow cards. In his 3rd season he played 25 games and received six yellow cards. In the 2016–17 season he made his first assist.

=== Meiendorfer SV ===
On 9 January 2020, it was confirmed, that Nadjem had joined Meiendorfer SV in the Oberliga Hamburg.

== International career ==
Nadjem was called up in January for the Afghanistan national team. He made his debut for Afghanistan in a 2–1 friendly win over Singapore on 23 March 2017.
