= Bernhard Chenaux =

Swiss footballer (born 1939)

Personal information
- Full name: Bernhard Chenaux
- Date of birth: 1 September 1939 (age 87)
- Place of birth: Switzerland
- Position: Striker

Senior career*
| Years | Team | Apps | (Gls) |
| 1957–1961 | FC Basel | 21 | (2) |
- * Club domestic league appearances and goals

Bernhard Chenaux (born 1 September 1939) is a Swiss retired footballer who played in the 1950s and 1960s as forward.

Chenaux joined FC Basel's first team in their 1957–58 season under manager Rudi Strittich. After playing in two test matches, Chenaux played his domestic league debut for the club in the away game on 23 February 1958 against Urania Genève Sport as he was substituted in for the injured Silvan Thüler. In the same match he scored his first goal for his club, but this could not save Basel from a 2–3 defeat.

Between the years 1957 and 1961 Chenaux played a total of 38 games for Basel scoring a total of four goals. 21 of these games were in the Nationalliga A, one in the Swiss Cup and the other 16 were friendly games. He scored two goals in the domestic league and the other two were scored during the test games.

== Sources ==
- Die ersten 125 Jahre. Publisher: Josef Zindel im Friedrich Reinhardt Verlag, Basel. ISBN 978-3-7245-2305-5
- Verein "Basler Fussballarchiv" Homepage
