= Peter-Jürgen Sanmann =

German footballer

Personal information
- Full name: Peter-Jürgen Sanmann
- Date of birth: 5 August 1935
- Date of death: 15 March 2016 (aged 80)
- Place of death: Hamburg, Germany
- Position: Forward

Youth career
- until 1954: SC Concordia von 1907

Senior career*
Years	Team	Apps	(Gls)
1954–1955	SC Concordia von 1907		
1955–1957	FC Basel	45	(14)
1957–1962	SC Concordia von 1907	106	(16)

International career
1955	Germany U-23		
- * Club domestic league appearances and goals

Peter-Jürgen Sanmann (5 August 1935 – 15 March 2016) was a German professional footballer who played in the 1950s and 1960s. He played as forward or winger.

== Career ==
=== Club ===
Sanmann played youth football with SC Concordia von 1907 in Hamburg. Playing for the amateur league team, he was nominated by national coach Sepp Herberger for the debut game of the newly launched junior national team (U–23) for the international match against Yugoslavia in Frankfurt on 25 June 1955. In the 3–3 draw, he played on the left wing and scored a goal.

Sanmann signed his first professional contract with FC Basel's club chairman Jules Düblin. He joined their first team for their 1955–56 season under trainer Béla Sárosi. After playing in two test matches, Sanmann played his domestic league debut for his new club in the away game on 28 August 1955 as Basel were defeated 2–0 by Chiasso. He scored his first goal for his new team on 11 September in the away game as Basel drew 2–2 with Schaffhausen. Toward the end of that season, on 10 June 1956 in the home game at the Landhof, Sanmann scored a hat-trick as the team beat Fribourg. His attacking partner Josef Hügi scored four goals and the team went on to win by nine goals to one. Fribourg suffered relegation at the end of the season and Sanmann extended his contract with FCB for another year.

Between the years 1955 and 1957 Sanmann played a total of 67 games for Basel scoring a total of 18 goals. 45 of these games were in the Nationalliga A, six in the Swiss Cup and 16 were friendly games. He scored 14 goals in the domestic league, three in the cup and the other was scored during the test games.

After his two seasons with FC Basel, Sanmann returned to his club of origin, who at this time had just been promoted to the Oberliga Nord, the top tier of Germann football at this time. Sanmann then played for SC Concordia von 1907 until the end of his active playing career. He played his last league game on 21 April 1962 in a 3–2 home defeat against VfR Neumünster. In this game he played on the left wing and scored a goal.

=== International ===
The 19-year-old attacking winger of the Hanseatic amateur league team SC Concordia, was nominated by national coach Sepp Herberger for the debut game of the newly formed junior national team U-23, for the international match on 25 June 1955 in Frankfurt against Yugoslavia. In the 3-3 draw, Sanmann played on the left wing and scored a goal. On 7 August he played for the Northern Germany association team, which won the representative game against Southern Germany with 4-3 goals in front of 45,000 spectators in Hamburg. The talent from the amateur league, together with Klaus Stürmer, Uwe Seeler, Willi Schröder and Erich Haase, formed the attack for the NFV selection.

== Private life ==
After his football career, Sanmann worked as a sales manager. He lived in his home town Hamburg until he died on 15 March 2016.

== Sources ==
- Josef Zindel (2018). FC Basel 1893. Die ersten 125 Jahre (in German). Basel: Friedrich Reinhardt Verlag. ISBN 978-3-7245-2305-5.
- Lorenz Knieriem (2006). Spielerlexikon 1890–1963 (in German). Kassel: AGON Sportverlag. ISBN 3-89784-148-7.
- Verein "Basler Fussballarchiv" Homepage
