= Hans Loosli =

Swiss footballer

Personal information
- Full name: Hans Loosli
- Date of birth: unknown
- Place of birth: Switzerland
- Position: Striker

Senior career*
| Years | Team | Apps | (Gls) |
| 1956–1957 | FC Basel | 4 | (1) |
| 1957– | FC Breite | | |
- * Club domestic league appearances and goals

Hans Loosli is a Swiss former footballer who played for FC Basel in the 1950s. He played as forward.

Loosli joined Basel's first team for their 1956–57 season under manager Béla Sárosi. Loosli played his first match for the club on Sunday 21 October 1956 as Basel played in the Swiss Cup third round and won 1–0 against SC Burgdorf. Loosli played his domestic league debut for the club in the away game on 4 November 1956 as Basel played against Schaffhausen. He scored his first goal for his club in the same match as Basel won 2–0.

In his one season with the club, Loosli played a total of eight games for Basel scoring one goal. Four of these games were in the Nationalliga A, one in the Swiss Cup and three were friendly games.

After his time with Basel, Loosli moved on to play for the local club FC Breite in a lower league.

== Sources ==
- Die ersten 125 Jahre. Publisher: Josef Zindel im Friedrich Reinhardt Verlag, Basel. ISBN 978-3-7245-2305-5
- Verein "Basler Fussballarchiv" Homepage

(NB: Despite all efforts, the editors of these books and the authors in "Basler Fussballarchiv" have failed to be able to identify all the players, their date and place of birth or date and place of death, who played in the games during the early years of FC Basel)
