= Bruno Locher =

Swiss footballer

Personal information
- Full name: Bruno Locher
- Date of birth: unknown
- Place of birth: Switzerland
- Position: Striker

Senior career*
Years	Team	Apps	(Gls)
until 1956	SC Kleinhüningen		
1956–1957	FC Basel	5	(0)
- * Club domestic league appearances and goals

Bruno Locher is a Swiss retired footballer who played in the 1950s as striker.

Locher first played for SC Kleinhüningen and joined FC Basel's first team for their 1956–57 season under manager Béla Sárosi. After playing in four test matches, Locher played his domestic league debut for his new club in the home game at the Landhof on 28 October 1956 as Basel won 3–0 against Chiasso.

Locher played only one season for Basel, and during this time, he played a total of 11 games, scoring one goal. Five of these games were in the Nationalliga A, one in the Swiss Cup, and five were friendly games. He scored his goal in the test game against Biel-Bienne on 29 July 1956.

== Sources ==
- Die ersten 125 Jahre. Publisher: Josef Zindel im Friedrich Reinhardt Verlag, Basel. ISBN 978-3-7245-2305-5
- Verein "Basler Fussballarchiv" Homepage

(NB: Despite all efforts, the editors of these books and the authors in "Basler Fussballarchiv" have failed to be able to identify all the players, their date and place of birth or date and place of death, who played in the games during the early years of FC Basel)
