= John Frye =

Scottish footballer

Personal information
- Full name: John Marr Frye
- Date of birth: 27 July 1933
- Place of birth: Ardrossan, Scotland
- Date of death: 21 March 2005 (aged 71)
- Place of death: Ardrossan, Scotland
- Position: Inside forward

Youth career
- Ardrossan Winton Rovers

Senior career*
| Years | Team | Apps | (Gls) |
| 1955–1959 | Hibernian | 20 | (1) |
| 1959–1961 | St Mirren | 15 | (6) |
| 1961 | Sheffield Wednesday | 0 | (0) |
| 1961–1962 | Tranmere Rovers | 21 | (6) |
| 1962–1963 | Queen of the South | 26 | (4) |
| 1963–1966 | Hamilton Academical | 84 | (9) |
| 1966–1967 | Stranraer | 19 | (4) |
| 1967– | Ardrossan Winton Rovers | | |
| Total | | 185 | (30) |
- * Club domestic league appearances and goals

John Frye (1933–2005) was a footballer who played as an inside forward in the Scottish Football League for Hibernian, St Mirren, Queen of the South, Hamilton Academical and Stranraer, and in the Football League for Sheffield Wednesday and Tranmere Rovers.
