= Willy Jermann =

Swiss footballer (1932–2020)

Personal information
- Full name: Wilhelm Franziskus Jermann
- Date of birth: 19 April 1932
- Place of birth: Switzerland
- Date of death: 12 December 2020 (aged 88)
- Place of death: Laufen, Switzerland
- Position: Defender

Senior career*
Years	Team	Apps	(Gls)
1957–1958	FC Basel	5	(0)
1958–1959	FC Laufen		
- * Club domestic league appearances and goals

Wilhelm Franziskus "Willy" Jermann (19 April 1932 – 12 December 2020) was a Swiss footballer who played in the 1950s as defender in the late 1950s.

Jermann joined FC Basel's first team for their 1957–58 season under manager Rudi Strittich. After playing in one test match Jermann played his domestic league debut for the club in the home game at the Landhof on 29 December 1957 as Basel played a 1–1 draw against Lausanne-Sport.

Jermann played only this one season for Basel and played eight games. Five of these games were in the Nationalliga A and the other three were friendly games. For the following season Jermann moved on to play for FC Laufen.

== Sources ==
- Rotblau: Jahrbuch Saison 2017/2018. Publisher: FC Basel Marketing AG. ISBN 978-3-7245-2189-1
- Die ersten 125 Jahre. Publisher: Josef Zindel im Friedrich Reinhardt Verlag, Basel. ISBN 978-3-7245-2305-5
- Verein "Basler Fussballarchiv" Homepage
