= Pierre Geiser =

Swiss footballer (1935-2016)

Personal information
- Full name: Pierre Geiser
- Date of birth: 25 March 1935
- Place of birth: Saint-Ouen, France
- Date of death: 20 September 2016 (aged 81)
- Place of death: Geneva, Switzerland
- Position: Forward

Senior career*
Years	Team	Apps	(Gls)
1955–1957	FC Basel	2	(1)
1957–1958	FC Nordstern Basel		
1958–	Servette FC		
- * Club domestic league appearances and goals

Pierre Geiser (25 March 1935 – 20 September 2016) was a Swiss footballer who played in the late 1950s. He played as a forward.

Geiser joined FC Basel's first team in their 1955–56 season under trainer Béla Sárosi. After playing in one test match, Geiser played his domestic league debut for the club in the home game at the Landhof on 10 June 1956 as Basel won 9–1 against FC Fribourg. He scored his only goal for the club a week later in the away game against La Chaux-de-Fonds. But this goal could not save the team from a 2–6 defeat.

Geiser played two season for Basel in six games scoring that one goal. Two of these games were in the Nationalliga A, and the other four were friendly games.

After his time with FC Basel, Geiser moved on to play for FC Nordstern Basel, who at that time played in the Nationalliga B (second tier of Swiss football). One year later he moved on again and signed for Servette, where he stayed at least one season. Geiser lived in Geneva until he died on 20 September 2016.

== Sources ==
- Die ersten 125 Jahre. Publisher: Josef Zindel im Friedrich Reinhardt Verlag, Basel. ISBN 978-3-7245-2305-5
- Verein "Basler Fussballarchiv" Homepage
