= Rudolf Burger (footballer) =

Swiss footballer (born 1934)

Personal information
- Full name: Rudolf Burger
- Date of birth: 21 July 1934
- Place of birth: Switzerland
- Positions: Defender; forward

Senior career*
Years	Team	Apps	(Gls)
1954–1955	Nordstern Basel	4	(0)
1955–1956	Cantonal Neuchatel	7	(0)
1955–1957	Nordstern Basel	34	(9)
1957–1959	FC Basel	38	(11)
1959–1963	Grasshopper Club	71	(13)
1963–1964	Biel-Bienne	11	(2)
1964–1965	Grasshopper Club	4	(0)
- * Club domestic league appearances and goals

Rudolf Burger (born 21 July 1934) is a Swiss former footballer who played in the 1950s and 1960s. He played mainly as a forward, but also as a defender.

== Football career ==
Burger first played for Nordstern Basel and then for Cantonal Neuchatel, but after just half a year he returned to Nordstern. Both teams played in the Nationalliga B (the second tier of Swiss football).

Burger joined FC Basel's first team for their 1957–58 season under the Austrian trainer Rudi Strittich. After five test games Burger played his domestic league debut for his new club in the home game at the Landhof on 25 August 1957 as Basel played against Winterthur. He scored his first goal for the club in the same game as Basel won the game. In fact Burger scored a hat-trick and Basel won 8–1.

Between the years 1957 and 1959 Burger played a total of 65 games for Basel scoring a total of 21 goals. 38 of these games were in the Nationalliga A, three in the Swiss Cup and 24 were friendly games. He scored 11 goals in the domestic league, one in the cup and the other nine were scored during the test games.

After his time with Basel Burger moved on to play for Grasshopper Club and for Biel-Bienne.

== Sources ==
- Die ersten 125 Jahre. Publisher: Josef Zindel im Friedrich Reinhardt Verlag, Basel. ISBN 978-3-7245-2305-5
- Verein "Basler Fussballarchiv" Homepage
