= Janos Magyar =

Hungarian footballer

Janos (Istvan) Magyar
Personal information
- Full name: Janos Magyar
- Date of birth: 1927 (age 98–99)
- Position: Striker

Senior career*
Years	Team	Apps	(Gls)
1956–1957	Brühl St. Gallen		
1957–1958	FC Basel	9	(0)
- * Club domestic league appearances and goals

Janos (Istvan) Magyar (born 1927) was a Hungarian footballer who played in the 1950s. He played as a striker.

Magyar first played for Brühl St. Gallen. He joined FC Basel's first team for their 1957–58 season under manager Rudi Strittich. Magyar played his domestic league debut for his new club in the home game at the Landhof on 10 November 1957 as Basel won 3–2 against Bellinzona. He scored his first goal for his club on 23 March 1958 in the away game against Grenchen as Basel won 4–3.

Magyar played only this one season for Basel. He played a total of 18 games scoring just this one goal. Nine of these games were in the Nationalliga A, one in the Swiss Cup and eight were friendly games.

== Sources ==
- Die ersten 125 Jahre. Publisher: Josef Zindel im Friedrich Reinhardt Verlag, Basel. ISBN 978-3-7245-2305-5
- Verein "Basler Fussballarchiv" Homepage

(NB: Despite all efforts, the editors of these books and the authors in "Basler Fussballarchiv" have failed to be able to identify all the players, their date and place of birth or date and place of death, who played in the games during the early years of FC Basel)
