= Gustav Borer =

Swiss footballer (born 1930)

Personal information
- Full name: Gustav Borer
- Date of birth: 19 June 1930 (age 96)
- Place of birth: Switzerland
- Position: Midfielder

Senior career*
Years	Team	Apps	(Gls)
1955–1958	FC Basel	40	(0)
1958–1959	FC Aarau	16	(0)
- * Club domestic league appearances and goals

Gustav Borer (born 19 June 1930) is a Swiss former footballer who played in the 1950s. He played as midfielder.

Borer joined FC Basel's first team in their 1955–56 season under trainer Béla Sárosi. Borer played his domestic league debut for the club in the away game on 16 June 1956 as Basel were defeated 2–6 by La Chaux-de-Fonds. He scored his only goal for his club on 2 November 1957 in the Swiss Cup home match at the Landhof as Basel were 8–0 winners against FC Olten.

Between the years 1955 and 1958 Borer played a total of 50 games for Basel scoring only that one goal. 40 of these games were in the Nationalliga A, one was in the Swiss Cup and the other nine were friendly games.

After his time with FC Basel Merlini moved on to play for FC Aarau, who at that time played in the Nationalliga B (second tier of Swiss football).

== Sources ==
- Die ersten 125 Jahre. Publisher: Josef Zindel im Friedrich Reinhardt Verlag, Basel. ISBN 978-3-7245-2305-5
- Verein "Basler Fussballarchiv" Homepage
