= Raymond Gilliéron =

Swiss footballer

Personal information
- Full name: Raymond Gilliéron
- Date of birth: unknown
- Place of birth: Switzerland
- Position: Central defender

Senior career*
Years	Team	Apps	(Gls)
until 1954	Brühl St. Gallen		
1954–1956	FC Basel	11	(0)
- * Club domestic league appearances and goals

Raymond Gilliéron is a Swiss former footballer who played in the 1950s. He played as defender.

Gilliéron initially played for Brühl St. Gallen. Later, he joined FC Basel's first team for their 1954–55 season under player-coach René Bader. After participating in a test game, Gilliéron made his domestic league debut for the club on 27 February 1955, in an away match where Basel suffered a 0–1 defeat to Bellinzona. In that season he played nine league games and he stayed at the club another year.

Between the years 1954 and 1956 Gilliéron played a total of 17 games for Basel without scoring a goal. 11 of these games were in the Nationalliga A, one was in the Swiss Cup and five were friendly games. In 1957, Raymond goes all the way to Los Angeles, because he as sign for the Los Angeles Kickers. But at the moment he come for the starting season, the club as deposit the bilan, so he live to New York Since he stayed for 4 years, making his place in the local club all along.

[2]

== Sources ==
- Die ersten 125 Jahre. Publisher: Josef Zindel im Friedrich Reinhardt Verlag, Basel. ISBN 978-3-7245-2305-5
- Verein "Basler Fussballarchiv" Homepage

(NB: Despite all efforts, the editors of these books and the authors in "Basler Fussballarchiv" have failed to be able to identify all the players, their date and place of birth or date and place of death, who played in the games during the early years of FC Basel)
