= Rudolf Rickenbacher =

Swiss footballer (born 1934)

Personal information
- Full name: Rudolf Rickenbacher
- Date of birth: 5 December 1934 (age 91)
- Place of birth: Switzerland
- Position: Midfielder

Senior career*
Years	Team	Apps	(Gls)
1954–1955	FC Nordstern Basel	6	(0)
1955–1957	FC Basel	10	(0)
1957–1958	FC La Chaux-de-Fonds	6	(0)
1958–1961	FC Basel	38	(0)
- * Club domestic league appearances and goals

Rudolf Rickenbacher (born 5 December 1934) is a Swiss former footballer who played in the 1950s and early 1960s. He played as midfielder.

Rickenbacher first played for FC Nordstern Basel in the Nationalliga B, the second tier of Swiss football. He joined FC Basel's first team in their 1955–56 season under trainer Béla Sárosi. After playing in one test match, Rickenbacher played his domestic league debut for his new club in the away game on 20 May 1956 as Basel played a goalless draw with Lugano.

After two seasons with Basel, Rickenbacher moved on to play one season with La Chaux-de-Fonds, but returned to Basel there after.

Between the years 1955 to 1957 and again from 1958 to 1961 Rickenbacher played a total of 87 games for Basel without scoring a goal. 48 of these games were in the Nationalliga A, four in the Swiss Cup, three in the International Football Cup and 32 were friendly games.

== Sources ==
- Die ersten 125 Jahre. Publisher: Josef Zindel im Friedrich Reinhardt Verlag, Basel. ISBN 978-3-7245-2305-5
- Verein "Basler Fussballarchiv" Homepage
