= Hansruedi Blatter =

Swiss footballer (1936-1971)

Personal information
- Full name: Hansruedi Blatter
- Date of birth: 1936
- Place of birth: Switzerland
- Date of death: 1971 (aged 34–35)
- Position: Goalkeeper

Senior career*
Years	Team	Apps	(Gls)
1955–1958	FC Basel	6	(0)
- * Club domestic league appearances and goals

Hansruedi Blatter (born 1936, died 1971) was a Swiss footballer who played for FC Basel in the 1950s. Blatter played as goalkeeper.

Blatter joined FC Basel's first team in their 1955–56 season under trainer Béla Sárosi. After one friendly match, Blatter played his domestic league debut for his club on 20 May 1956 in the away game as Basel drew goalless against Lugano.

Blatter played three seasons for Basel, and in total, he played 15 games. Six of these games were in the Nationalliga A and nine were friendly games.

== Sources ==
- Die ersten 125 Jahre. Publisher: Josef Zindel im Friedrich Reinhardt Verlag, Basel. ISBN 978-3-7245-2305-5
- Verein "Basler Fussballarchiv" Homepage

(NB: Despite all efforts, the editors of these books and the authors in "Basler Fussballarchiv" have failed to be able to identify all the players, their date and place of birth or date and place of death, who played in the games during the early years of FC Basel)
