= Viganello =

Coordinates: 46°01′N 8°59′E

- Quarter
- Flag Coat of arms

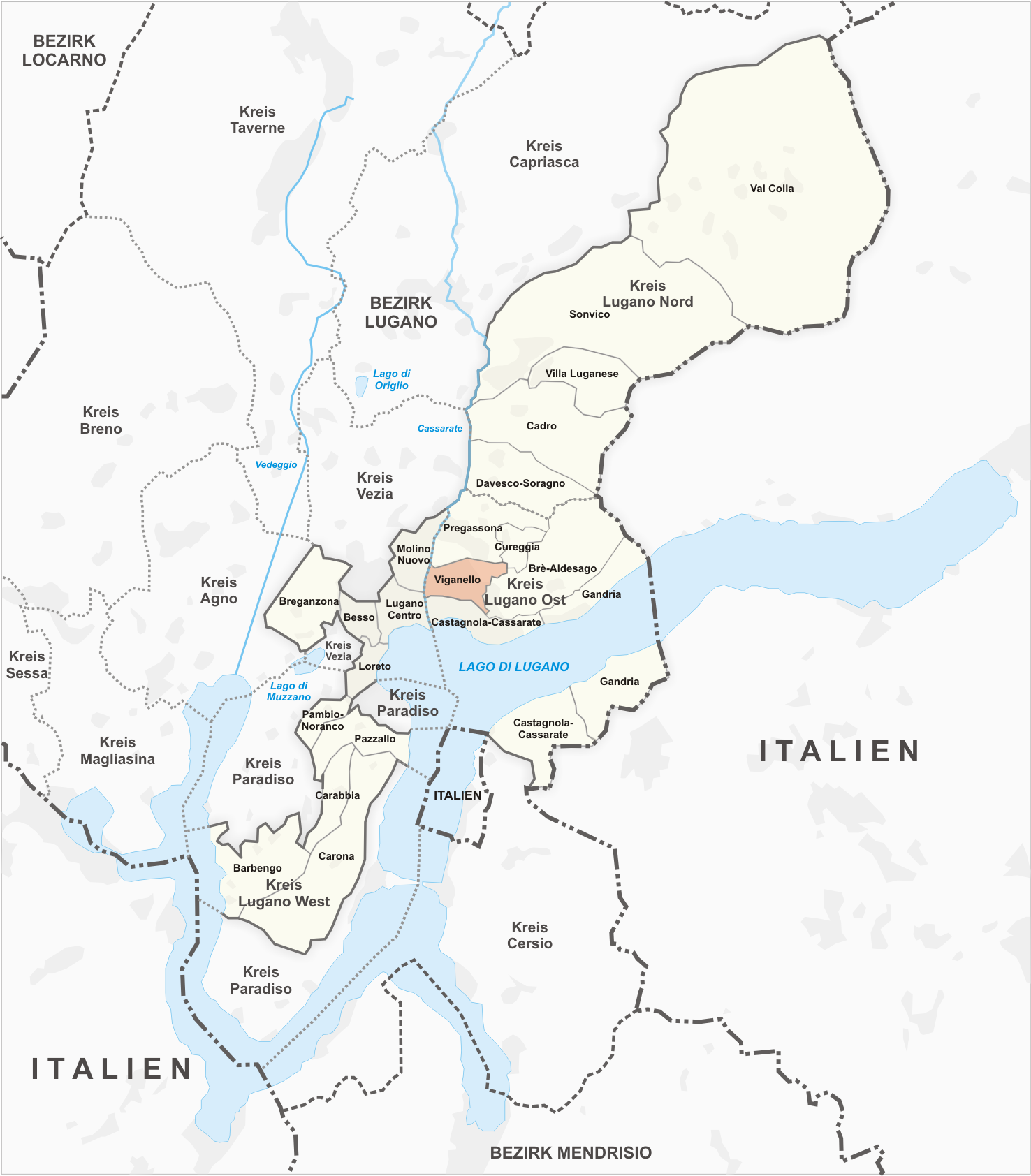
- Country: Switzerland
- Canton: Ticino
- District: Lugano
- City: Lugano

Area
  - Total: 1.2 km^{2} (0.46 sq mi)

Population (2025-12-31)
  - Total: 7,133
  - Density: 5,900/km^{2} (15,000/sq mi)

Viganello is a quarter of the city of Lugano, Switzerland. Viganello was formerly a municipality of its own, having been incorporated into Lugano in 2004. It was first recorded in 1300 as de Viganello.

The municipality also contained the village Albonago. It had 238 inhabitants in 1783, which increased to 244 in 1808, 319 in 1850, 1477 in 1910, 2163 in 1950 and 5587 in 1990.
