= Silvan Thüler =

Swiss footballer (1932-2011)

Sämi Thüler
Personal information
- Full name: Silvan Thüler
- Date of birth: 1 August 1932
- Place of birth: Solothurn, Switzerland
- Date of death: 13 August 2011 (aged 79)
- Place of death: Riehen, Switzerland
- Position: Defender

Youth career
- –1950: FC Solothurn

Senior career*
Years	Team	Apps	(Gls)
1950–1955	FC Solothurn	76	(11)
1955–1962	FC Basel	148	(4)
1962–1963	FC Concordia Basel		

International career
1956–1958	Switzerland	2	(0)
- * Club domestic league appearances and goals

Silvan "Sämi" Thüler (1 August 1932 – 13 August 2011) was a Swiss international footballer. He played as a defender. After his football career he became restaurant landlord and later a manager.

== Football career ==
Born in Solothurn, Thüler played his youth football with FC Solothurn, advancing to their first team in the summer of 1950. At the end of the 1951–52 season Solothurn won their group in the Swiss 1. Liga (third national level) and in the play-offs won promotion to the Nationalliga B. Thüler remained with his club for a further three seasons.

Transfer fees in Switzerland were rising rapidly in this period. FC Basel, under the leadership of Jules Düblin, had been trying to stay clear of this transfer trading. But because they had lost a number of important players, the board of directors changed their approach to the subject and chairman Düblin made Thüler an offer he couldn't refuse and he joined Basel's first team for their 1955–56 season under head coach Béla Sárosi. After playing in two test games, Thüler played his domestic league debut for the club in the away game on 28 August 1955 as Basel were defeated 2–0 by Chiasso. He scored his first goal for his new team one week later, on 4 September, in the home game at the Landhof as Basel won 3–2 against Zürich.

Between 1955 and 1962 he played semi-professional for the club and during this time Thüler played a total of 216 games for Basel scoring a total of six goals. 148 of these games were in the Swiss Serie A, 13 in the Swiss Cup, six were in the International Football Cup and 49 were friendly games. He scored four goal in the domestic league, the other two were scored in the Swiss Cup matches.

In the 1962–63 season Thüler played as amateur for FC Concordia Basel in the Swiss 1. Liga ending his active football thereafter.

== International career ==
"Sämi" Thüler played two games for the Swiss National team. His debut was on the 21 November 1956 in the 3–1 away win against West Germany at the Waldstadion in Frankfurt. The other was one and a half years later, on 7 May 1958 as the Swiss lost 3–2 against Sweden.

== Private life ==
Thüler married Lotti Feller in April 1956. They had two daughters, twins, Barbara and Silvia. First he worked for the local gas and waterboard. Later he was restaurant landlord and managed two restaurants in Münchenstein, before he took over as manager of the "Wenkenhof", two villas located on the eastern outskirts of the Swiss municipality of Riehen near Basel, the "Alte" and the "Neue" Wenken, including the surrounding large parks (Wenkenpark). Sämi Thülers' death was completely unexpected.

== Honours ==
Solothurn

- Swiss 1. Liga champions and promoted to Nationalliga B: 1952

== Sources ==
- Josef Zindel (2018). FC Basel 1893. Die ersten 125 Jahre (in German). Basel: Friedrich Reinhardt Verlag. ISBN 978-3-7245-2305-5.
- Verein "Basler Fussballarchiv" Homepage
