= Pierre Redolfi =

French footballer and coach (1923–2019)

Personal information
- Full name: Pierre Redolfi
- Date of birth: 14 January 1923
- Place of birth: Huningue, France
- Date of death: 9 February 2019 (aged 96)
- Place of death: Mulhouse, France
- Positions: Defender; midfielder

Youth career
- until 1939: AS Huningue
- 1939–1945: RC Strasbourg

Senior career*
| Years | Team | Apps | (Gls) |
| 1945–1947 | AS Huningue | | |
| 1947–1958 | FC Basel | 250 | (0) |
| 1958–1960 | FC Hegenheim | | |

Managerial career
- 1958–1960: FC Hegenheim
- FC Saint-Louis
- AS Huningue
- 1970–1973: Concordia Basel
- * Club domestic league appearances and goals

Pierre "Peter" Redolfi (14 January 1923 – 9 February 2019) was a French footballer and later coach. He played in the 1940s and 1950s as defender or midfielder and he was coach in the 1960s and early 1970s.

== Football career ==
Until the outbreak of the second world war Redolfi played his youth football by local club AS Huningue. During the war, while in military service, his involvement in football was with the reserves of RC Strasbourg. He never played for their first team, however after the war he did receive the offer of a professional contract, but chose to rejoin his local club in Huningue.

Two years later Redolfi joined FC Basel's first team in their 1947–48 season under player-coach Ernst Hufschmid. After two test games Redolfi played his domestic league debut for the club in the home game at the Landhof on 9 November 1947 as Basel played against Lausanne-Sport. The biggest success in his football career was as Basel won the Swiss championship title in Basel's 1952–53 season under player-coach René Bader.

Between the years 1947 and 1958 Redolfi played a total of 393 games for Basel, but without scoring a goal. 250 of these games were in the Nationalliga A, 34 in the Swiss Cup and 109 were friendly games.

After his time with Basel, Redolfi became a player-coach for two seasons for FC Hegenheim, who at that time were playing in the top amateur league in France. Other coaching stations for Redolfi were for FC Saint-Louis and for his club of origin AS Huningue. Redolfi ended his career as a trainer in Basel. From 1970 to 1973 he was coach of Concordia Basel, who at that time played in the top amateur Swiss 1. Liga.

== Private life ==
Redolfi was born in Huningue, a commune in the Haut-Rhin department of Alsace in north-eastern France, a northern suburb of the Swiss city of Basel. He lived in Hunigue all his life. Professionally Redolfi, who was always an amateur footballer, worked as a draftsman for the Swiss company J. R. Geigy and the successor company Ciba-Geigy in their plant in Huningue. He later became their purchasing manager. Redolfi was married to Alice who outlived him by just over one year. The couple had a daughter and a son.

== Sources ==
- Rotblau: Jahrbuch Saison 2017/2018. Publisher: FC Basel Marketing AG. ISBN 978-3-7245-2189-1
- Die ersten 125 Jahre. Publisher: Josef Zindel im Friedrich Reinhardt Verlag, Basel. ISBN 978-3-7245-2305-5
- Verein "Basler Fussballarchiv" Homepage
