= Hansueli Oberer =

Swiss footballer (1929-2005)

Personal information
- Full name: Hansueli Oberer
- Date of birth: 11 May 1929
- Place of birth: Pratteln, Switzerland
- Date of death: 20 September 2005 (aged 76)
- Position: Striker

Senior career*
Years	Team	Apps	(Gls)
until 1954	FC Olten		
1954–1962	FC Basel	145	(23)
1962–	Concordia Basel		
- * Club domestic league appearances and goals

Hansueli Oberer (11 May 1929 – 20 September 2005) was a Swiss footballer who played in the 1950s and early 1960s as a forward.

Oberer first played for FC Olten in the 1 Liga, the third tier of Swiss football. He joined FC Basel's first team for their 1954–55 season under player-coach René Bader. After playing in five friendlies Oberer made his domestic league debut for his new club in the away game on 12 September 1954; he scored his first goal for his club in that game, but could not save the team from a 1–3 defeat by Chiasso.

Between 1954 and 1962 Oberer played 231 games for Basel and scored 37 goals; 145 games were in the Nationalliga A, 16 in the Swiss Cup, 6 in the International Football Cup and 64 were friendlies. He scored 23 goals in the domestic league, 2 in the Cup, 1 in the International Football Cup games and the other 11 were in friendlies.

Following his time with FC Basel Oberer moved on to play for Concordia Basel who at that time played in the 1 Liga, the third tier in Swiss football, where he ended his active football career.

== Sources ==
- Rotblau: Jahrbuch Saison 2017/2018. Publisher: FC Basel Marketing AG. ISBN 978-3-7245-2189-1
- Die ersten 125 Jahre. Publisher: Josef Zindel im Friedrich Reinhardt Verlag, Basel. ISBN 978-3-7245-2305-5
- Verein "Basler Fussballarchiv" Homepage
