= Werner Bopp =

Swiss footballer (1924-2006)

Personal information
- Full name: Werner Bopp
- Date of birth: 12 February 1924
- Place of birth: Düdingen, Switzerland
- Date of death: 22 October 2006 (aged 82)
- Position: Defender

Senior career*
Years	Team	Apps	(Gls)
1944–1960	FC Basel	321	(13)
1960–1961	Nordstern Basel		
- * Club domestic league appearances and goals

Werner Bopp (* 12 February 1924; † 22 October 2006) was a Swiss footballer who played nearly his entire career for FC Basel. He played mainly in the position as defender.

== Football career ==
Between the years 1944 and 1960 Bopp played a total of 496 games for Basel scoring a total of 20 goals. 321 of these games were in the Nationalliga A, 43 in the Swiss Cup and 132 were friendly games. He scored 13 goal in the domestic league, two in the Swiss Cup and the other five were scored during the test games.

In his first season Bopp played in three test games before he played his debut in domestic league game on 18 March 1945 against Lausanne Sports. Basel were relegated at the end of this season, but they achieved immediate promotion the following season. Bopp scored his first goal for Basel in the 1946–47 season on 21 June 1947 in the 5–1 victory against Cantonal Neuchatel.

His biggest success was the championship title in Basel's 1952–53 season. In addition to this title, Bopp also reached the Swiss Cup final with his club in Basel's 1946–47 season. They won the final 3–0 against Lausanne Sports. In the Stadion Neufeld on 7 April 1947 Paul Stöcklin scoring all three goals. Bopp moved to local rivals Nordstern Basel for the 1960–61 season and at the end this season he ended his football career.

== Titles and Honours ==
FC Basel

- Swiss Cup winner: 1946–47
- Swiss League Champion: 1952–53

== See also ==
- List of FC Basel players
- List of FC Basel seasons

== Sources ==
- Rotblau: Jahrbuch Saison 2017/2018. Publisher: FC Basel Marketing AG. ISBN 978-3-7245-2189-1
- Die ersten 125 Jahre. Publisher: Josef Zindel im Friedrich Reinhardt Verlag, Basel. ISBN 978-3-7245-2305-5
- Verein "Basler Fussballarchiv" Homepage
- 1946–47 at RSSSF
- 1952–53 at RSSSF
