= Ernst Klauser =

Swiss footballer (born 1934)

Personal information
- Date of birth: 22 December 1934
- Place of birth: Basel, Switzerland
- Position(s): Striker

Senior career*
Years	Team	Apps	(Gls)
1953–1955	FC Basel	9	(0)
1955–1956	Servette		
1956–1958	FC Basel	4	(1)
1958–	FC Black Stars Basel		
- *Club domestic league appearances and goals

Ernst Klauser (born 22 December 1934) is a Swiss footballer who played in the 1950s. He played as a striker.

== Career ==
Klauser joined FC Basel's first team for their 1953–54 season under player-coach René Bader. Klauser played his domestic league debut for the club in the away game on 29 November 1953 as Basel played a 2–2 draw with Servette.

Klauser stayed with Basel for two seasons and then he moved on to Servette for one season before he returned to his club of origin. He scored his first goal for his club on 16 March 1958 in the home game at the Landhof against Grasshopper Club. It was the last goal of the game but it did not save Basel from a 1–3 defeat.

Between the years 1953 to 1955 and again from 1956 to 1958, Klauser played a total of 28 games for Basel scoring a total of three goals. 13 of these games were in the Nationalliga A and 15 were friendly games. He scored one goal in the domestic league, the other two were scored during the test games.

Following his time with Basel Klauser moved on to play for the regional team FC Black Stars Basel.

== Sources ==
- Rotblau: Jahrbuch Saison 2017/2018. Publisher: FC Basel Marketing AG. ISBN 978-3-7245-2189-1
- Die ersten 125 Jahre. Publisher: Josef Zindel im Friedrich Reinhardt Verlag, Basel. ISBN 978-3-7245-2305-5
- Verein "Basler Fussballarchiv" Homepage
