= SC Concordia von 1907 =

German football club

- Full name: Sports Club Concordia von 1907 e.V.
- Nickname: Cordi
- Founded: 9 May 1907
- Dissolved: 30 June 2013
- Ground: Sportplatz Bekkamp, Jenfeld
- League: defunct
Home colours	Away colours

SC Concordia von 1907 was a German football club from Marienthal, a quarter in the Wandsbek borough of the city of Hamburg. In 2013, the club has merged with neighbours TSV Wandsbek-Jenfeld 81' (already having used their ground for a couple of years), renaming itself Wandsbeker TSV Concordia.

== History ==
=== Early years ===
The club was formed in 1907 as SC Concordia by a small group of seven enthusiastic cycle polo players, with football being only the second sport of the new association. However, cycle polo soon became unfashionable due to frequent crashes and football took over as the club's main interest. The club's name Concordia originated by Walter Stautz who saw it engraved in a medal.

In 1923, when Wandsbeck, as it was spelt at the time, was still a town in Schleswig-Holstein, the club merged with another local club, Germania, and from 1937, when the town became a part of Greater Hamburg, the press started referring to them as Concordia Hamburg although officially, it was just SC Concordia like before.

=== 1921 to 1933 ===
The club did not reach the highest level of play in the city of Hamburg till after World War I. In 1921–22, it played in the Kreisliga Groß-Hamburg – Alsterkreis, one of the two highest divisions in the city at the time, reaching sixth place out of eight teams. It repeated this performance in 1923 and 1924, but came last in its division in 1924–25. However, the team managed to retain its spot in the league through a good performance in the relegation round. Struggling on in the following season, Concordia was relegated back to the second level in 1927, after finishing last in its division again.

In the A-Klasse Hamburg – Staffel 3 (II), the club delivered an average performance in 1927–28, earning a fourth-place finish. In the 1929–30 season, the club declined further, coming last in what was now the Bezirksliga Hamburg – Alster Staffel and finding itself relegated to the third division.

=== 1933 to 1945 ===
Concordia returned to first division football in 1939, when it won promotion to the Gauliga Nordmark, then the highest football league in northern Germany. Due to the outbreak of World War II, the league was split into two regional groups for 1939–40, but reunited the next season. Concordia suffered a last place finish in 1941 and was relegated from the Gauliga, unable to return to the league which was disbanded in 1945.

=== 1945 to 1963 ===
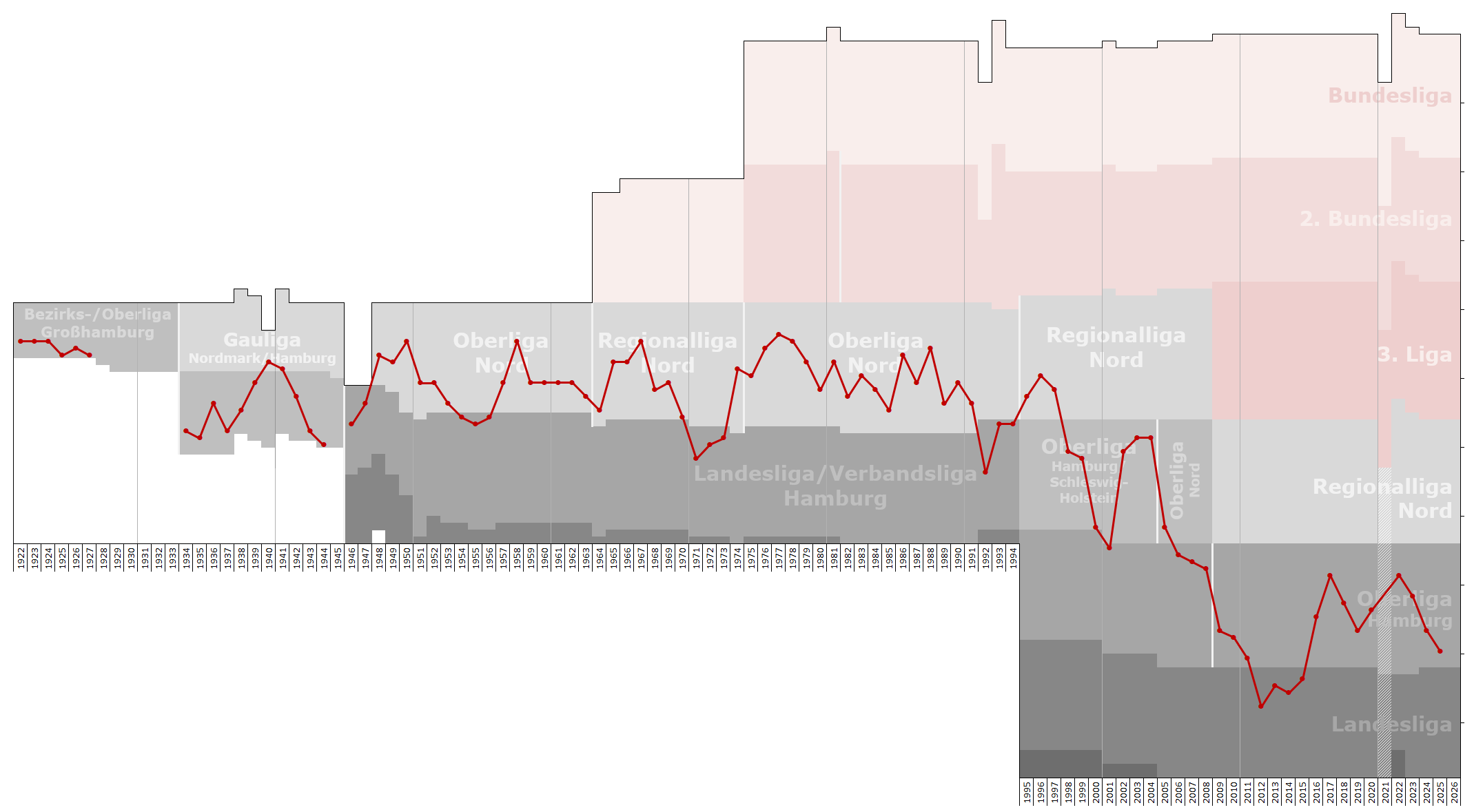
Historical chart of SC Concordia league performance

Following the war, the club became one of thirteen clubs in the Stadtliga Hamburg, the highest league in the region until 1947. In 1946–47, Concordia came third in this league and, together with Hamburger SV, FC St Pauli and Victoria Hamburg, was admitted to the new Oberliga Nord (I).

In Oberliga play, the club managed several mid-table finishes, with a sixth place in 1949–50 being its best performance. In 1953, it was relegated to the Amateurliga Hamburg (II) after coming 15th out of 16 teams. In three seasons in this league, the team won two championships and a runners-up spot and won promotion back to the Oberliga in 1956.

With the exception of a sixth-place result in 1957–58, the club continually flirted with relegation, but survived managed to survive until 1963 when the Oberligen were disbanded in favor of the new nationwide first division Bundesliga.

=== 1963 to 1974 ===
Concordia qualified for the new second division Regionalliga Nord despite only coming 14th in 1963. In its first Regionalliga season, Cordi continued to struggle but improved somewhat after 1964. Another sixth-place finish in 1967 stands out as the club's best performance in this era, but by 1970 it was relegated once more, to the tier three Landesliga Hamburg. After three seasons, the team returned to the Regionalliga for what was the final season for the Regionalligen before they were replaced by the 2. Bundesliga in 1974.

=== 1974 to 2008 ===
A tenth place in 1974 was not enough to qualify for the new second division and Cordi became part of the newly recreated Oberliga Nord (III). It remained in this league for the next 17 seasons, without ever coming close to promotion, a fifth place in 1977 being its best result.

In 1991, the club's luck finally run out and it lost its relegation battle, having to step down to the Verbandsliga Hamburg (IV). After an eighth place in its first season there, it earned two championships in the following campaigns, with their second title earning the team promotion to the new Regionalliga Nord (III).

Concordia enjoyed three season there before falling to relegation again and having to return to the Oberliga. After three seasons in the Oberliga Hamburg/Schleswig-Holstein, the club was relegated again, back to the Verbandsliga. A title in this league however moved the team straight back up and it enjoyed three excellent seasons in the Oberliga with two third places in 2003 and 2004 being the best results.

Upon recreation of the Oberliga Nord in 2004, the club was immediately relegated to the Verbandsliga and has since spent its time there. In 2008, the Verbandsliga Hamburg was renamed Oberliga Hamburg.

=== 2008 to 2013: Final years ===
In the final of the Hamburg Cup they won against Altonaer FC 93 with 2–1, so they started in the DFB-Pokal in 2009–10. There they were defeated by TuS Koblenz 4–0. Concordia spent three more seasons in the Oberliga before sliding down to the Landesliga for their final two seasons. They ended at third in 2012–13 before the merged club Wandsbeker TSV took their place for the 2013–14 season.

== Honours ==
The club's honours:

- Amateurliga Hamburg (II)
  - Champions: 1954, 1956
  - Runners-up: 1955
- Landesliga Hamburg (III)
  - Runners-up: 1973
- Verbandsliga Hamburg (IV–V)
  - Champions: 1993, 1994, 2001
- Hamburger Pokal
  - Winners: 1987, 2009

== Recent managers ==
Manager	Start	Finish
Andreas Klobedanz		7 October 2008
Andreas Reinke	7 October 2008	
Aki Cholevas	2013	

== Final seasons ==
The final seasons of the club:

Year	Division	Position
1999–2000	Oberliga Hamburg/Schleswig-Holstein (IV)	16th ↓
2000–01	Verbandsliga Hamburg (V)	1st ↑
2001–02	Oberliga Hamburg/Schleswig-Holstein (IV)	5th
2002–03	Oberliga Hamburg/Schleswig-Holstein	3rd
2003–04	Oberliga Hamburg/Schleswig-Holstein	3rd
2004–05	Oberliga Nord (IV)	16th ↓
2005–06	Verbandsliga Hamburg (V)	2nd
2006–07	Verbandsliga Hamburg	3rd
2007–08	Verbandsliga Hamburg	4th
2008–09	Oberliga Hamburg (V)	13th
2009–10	Oberliga Hamburg	14th
2010–11	Oberliga Hamburg	17th ↓
2011–12	Landesliga Hamburg (VI)	6th
2012–13	Landesliga Hamburg	3rd

== DFB-Pokal appearances ==
The club has qualified for the first round of the German Cup seven times:

Season	Round	Date	Home	Away	Result	Attendance
1952–53 DFB-Pokal	First round	17 August 1952	Concordia Hamburg	Borussia Dortmund	4–3	
1952–53 DFB-Pokal	Second round	19 November 1952	Concordia Hamburg	VfB Mühlburg	4–3	
1952–53 DFB-Pokal	Quarter-final	1 February 1953	Waldhof Mannheim	Concordia Hamburg	2–1	
1962–63 DFB-Pokal	First round	1 June 1963	Concordia Hamburg	Tasmania 1900 Berlin	1–3	
1965–66 DFB-Pokal	First round	22 January 1966	TuS Haste	Concordia Hamburg	1–2	
1965–66 DFB-Pokal	Second round	19 February 1966	SV Werder Bremen	Concordia Hamburg	2–0	
1977–78 DFB-Pokal	First round	29 July 1977	Concordia Hamburg	FC Bayern Hof	2–0	
1977–78 DFB-Pokal	Second round	19 August 1977	Schwarz-Weiß Essen	Concordia Hamburg	2–0	
1978–79 DFB-Pokal	First round	4 August 1978	Südwest Ludwigshafen	Concordia Hamburg	2–0	
1980–81 DFB-Pokal	First round	28 August 1980	Concordia Hamburg	Hammer SpVg	2–2 aet	
1980–81 DFB-Pokal	First round replay	4 September 1980	Hammer SpVg	Concordia Hamburg	3–2	
1987–88 DFB-Pokal	First round	28 August 1987	Concordia Hamburg	SpVgg Erkenschwick	3–0 aet	
1987–88 DFB-Pokal	Second round	24 October 1987	1. FC Pforzheim	Concordia Hamburg	2–0	
2009–10 DFB-Pokal	First round	2 August 2009	Concordia Hamburg	TuS Koblenz	0–4	1100
