= Jules Düblin =

Swiss footballer and athlete (1895-1992)

Personal information
- Date of birth: 30 August 1895
- Date of death: 1992
- Position: Forward

Senior career*
Years	Team	Apps	(Gls)
1919–1926	FC Basel	27	(4)
- * Club domestic league appearances and goals

Jules Düblin (30 August 1895 – 1992) was a Swiss footballer and athlete. He played for FC Basel, mainly as a forward. Later he was member of the FC Basel board of directors. He was doctor, banker and politician, became author and private art collector.

== Football career ==
Between the years 1919 and 1926 Düblin played a total of 57 games for Basel scoring a total of 5 goals. 27 of these games were in the Swiss Serie A and 30 were friendly games. He scored four goals in the domestic league, the other was scored during the test games.

Düblin was also member of the FC Basel board of directors. He presided the club during the period July 1946 until Mai 1959. Thus in the club's history he is the most permanent president that the club has had to date. As President of the club he joined the Swiss Football League (SFL) and was appointed honorary Member in 1965.

== Private life ==
Doktor Jules Düblin made his career as banker, was authorized officer of the Swiss Bank Corporation. After his career he was founder member of VPK UBS Basel (a group of retired authorized officers of the Swiss Bank Association).

As politician Düblin was member of the Grand Council of Basel-Stadt and was president of Grand Council during 1953.

As private art collector he also collected memorabilia from FC Basel. Many of his FCB objects are now stored in the Swiss Sports Museum in Münchenstein. One of the most valuable pieces is a photograph of the team's first training in the Landhof in 1893.

== Sources ==
- Rotblau: Jahrbuch Saison 2017/2018. Publisher: FC Basel Marketing AG. ISBN 978-3-7245-2189-1
- Die ersten 125 Jahre. Publisher: Josef Zindel im Friedrich Reinhardt Verlag, Basel. ISBN 978-3-7245-2305-5
- Verein "Basler Fussballarchiv" Homepage
