= Béla Sárosi =

Hungarian footballer and manager

Personal information
- Full name: Béla Sárosi
- Date of birth: 15 May 1919
- Place of birth: Budapest, Hungary
- Date of death: 15 June 1993 (aged 74)
- Place of death: Zaragoza, Spain
- Position: Midfielder

Youth career
- 1933–1937: Műegyetemi AFC

Senior career*
| Years | Team | Apps | (Gls) |
| 1937–1946 | Ferencváros | | |
| 1946–1949 | Bologna | 77 | (4) |
| 1949–1950 | Bari | 21 | (2) |
| 1950–1951 | Junior Barranquilla | | |
| 1951 | Porto | | |
| 1952 | Real Zaragoza | | |
| 1953–1955 | Lugano | | |
| 1955 | Millonarios FC | 18 | (3) |

International career
| 1939–1945 | Hungary | 25 | (3) |

Managerial career
- 1953–1955: Lugano
- 1955–1957: Basel
- 1957–1958: Jahn Regensburg
- 1958–1959: Alemannia Aachen
- 1960–1961: Beerschot
Medal record
Representing Hungary
FIFA World Cup
| Runner-up | 1938 France |
- * Club domestic league appearances and goals

Béla Sárosi (15 May 1919 – 15 June 1993) was a Hungarian football player and manager.

He played for Ferencváros, Bologna, Bari, Junior Barranquilla, Porto, Real Zaragoza, Lugano and Millonarios FC. He gained 25 caps for Hungary.

He managed Lugano, FC Basel, Jahn Regensburg, Alemannia Aachen and Beerschot.
