= List of foreign Colombian league footballers =

This is a list of foreign players in the Categoría Primera A and the Categoría Primera B. The following players:

1. have not been capped for the Colombia national team on any level, independently from the birthplace.
2. have been born in Colombia and were capped by a foreign national team. This includes players who have dual citizenship with Colombia.

== Africa (CAF) ==
=== Cameroon ===
- Thierry Fondjeu – Expreso Rojo, Alianza Petrolera – 2008–2009
- Jules Ntamak – Boyacá Chicó, Alianza Petrolera – 2008–2009
- Ernest Tchoupe – Girardot F.C., Expreso Rojo, Alianza Petrolera – 2008–2010
- Modeste M'bami – Millonarios – 2014
- Oyié Flavié – Junior, Atlético Bucaramanga, Deportes Quindío, Santa Fe, Deportivo Pasto, Alianza Petrolera, Patriotas, Centauros Villavicencio, Boyacá Chicó – 1997–2006
- Joseph Mbarga – Junior, Once Caldas – 1998

=== Equatorial Guinea ===
- Carlos Bejarano – Córdoba, La Equidad, Independiente Medellín, América, Deportivo Pasto, Águilas Doradas, Unión Magdalena – 2006–2023
- Jimmy Bermúdez – Alianza Petrolera, Atlético Bucaramanga, Atlético Nacional, Envigado, Atlético Huila – 2006–2011
- Dio – Deportes Quindío – 2013
- Mauricio Mina – Deportes Tolima, Dépor, Envigado, Deportivo Pasto, Águilas Doradas, Boyacá Chicó, Orsomarso – 2002–2016
- Yoiver González – Millonarios, Fortaleza, América de Cali, Deportivo Pasto, Deportivo Pereira, Once Caldas, La Equidad – 2010–2016, 2018–
- Danny Quendambú – Deportivo Cali, Deportivo Pereira, Unión Magdalena – 2002–2004, 2010
- Mike Campaz – Centauros Villavicencio, Santa Fe, Expreso Rojo, Deportes Tolima, Deportivo Pasto, Once Caldas, Boca Juniors de Cali – 2006–2015, 2019–2020
- Rolan de la Cruz – Deportivo Cali, Deportivo Pasto, Santa Fe, Cortuluá, Fortaleza] – 2005–2008, 2011–2012

=== Gabon ===
- Pierre Aubameyang – Junior – 1996

=== Nigeria ===
- Felix Ademola – Deportes Tolima – 1996
- Usman Amodu – Llaneros F.C. – 2013
- Robert Egbeta – Llaneros F.C. – 2013

=== Senegal ===
- Babacar Sene – Unión Magdalena – 2008
- Birahim Diop – Deportivo Pereira – 2003–2005

=== South Africa ===
- Teboho Moloi - Once Caldas – 1995–1996
- Lebogang Morula – Once Caldas – 1996

== Asia (AFC) ==
=== India ===
- Aniket Bharti – Orsomarso, Santa Fe – 2022–2023

=== Palestine ===
- Pablo Abdala – Millonarios – 1994–1996
- Alejandro Naif – Santa Fe – 2004

=== Syria ===
- Pablo Sabbag – Deportivo Cali, Orsomarso, La Equidad – 2010–2011

=== Timor-Leste ===
- Franco Triana – Academia F.C. – 2010–2011
- Rangel Hernández – Academia F.C. – 2011

== Europe (UEFA) ==
=== Armenia ===
- Mauro Guevgeozián – Atlético Bucaramanga – 2016
- Jordy Monroy – Santa Fe, Boyacá Chicó, Independiente Medellín, Deportivo Pereira – 2015–2020, 2022–present
- Wbeymar Angulo – Patriotas, Bogotá, Atlético Huila, Alianza Petrolera – 2008–2012

=== Austria ===
- Rudolf Strittich – Samarios – 1951

=== Czech Republic ===
- Jiří Hanke – Samarios – 1951

=== England ===
- Neil Franklin – Santa Fe – 1950
- Charlie Mitten – Santa Fe – 1950–1951
- Billy Higgins – Millonarios – 1951
- George Mountford – Santa Fe – 1950–1951
- George Saunders – América, Fortaleza, Unión Magdalena, Patriotas, Envigado, Atlético Huila – 2013, 2013–2014, 2014, 2015, 2015–2022, 2023–

=== France ===
- Quentin Danloux – Patriotas Boyacá – 2020–2023

=== Hungary ===
- Béla Sárosi – Junior, Millonarios – 1950–1951, 1955
- Mihail Uram – Junior – 1951
- Gyula Zsengellér – Deportivo Samarios – 1951–1953
- Ernest Sabeditch – Deportivo Samarios – 1951
- Sándor Török – Deportivo Samarios – 1951
- Gerro Hinduliak – Deportivo Samarios – 1951
- József Samu – Deportivo Samarios – 1951
- László Füzesi – Deportivo Samarios – 1951
- György Marik – Deportivo Samarios, Santa Fe – 1951–1954
- László Szőke – Junior – 1951
- Imre Danko – Junior – 1951
- Wladislaw Zsoke – Junior – 1951
- Fernes Neyrs – Junior – 1951
- Gabriel Rakosky – Deportivo Samarios – 1952
- Kalman Lami – Deportivo Samarios – 1952
- Ladislao Magyar – Deportivo Samarios – 1952
- Nicolás Hrotko – Deportivo Samarios – 1952

=== Italy ===
- Luigi Di Franco – Deportivo Pereira – 1949–1950
- Angelo Bellotto – Deportivo Pereira, Huracán de Medellín – 1950–1951
- Alessandro Adam – Deportivo Samarios – 1951
- Bruno Gerzelli – Deportivo Samarios – 1952
- Corrado Contin – Deportivo Samarios – 1952
- Dante Mircoli – Atlético Bucaramanga – 1977

=== Lithuania ===
- Víctor Vitatutas – Deportes Caldas – 1949

=== Netherlands ===
- André Krul – Boyacá Chico, Deportivo Pasto – 2012–2013, 2014
- Michael Chacón – Atlético Nacional – 2021

=== Portugal ===
- Bruno Corte Real – Envigado – 2004

=== Romania ===
- Alexandru Negrescu – Junior, Deportivo Samarios – 1950–1951, 1951–1952

=== Scotland ===
- Bobby Flavell – Millonarios – 1950

=== Spain ===
- Alfredo di Stéfano – Millonarios – 1949–1953
- Diego Cascón – América – 2015
- Diego Gregori – América, Envigado – 2014, 2015–2017
- Héctor Rial – Santa Fe – 1948–1951
- Jesús María Lires – Santa Fe – 1948–1950
- Jesús Suárez – América – 2014
- Jorge Brazalez – América – 2014
- Mario Martínez Rubio – Jaguares de Córdoba – 2015
- Gorka Elustondo – Atlético Nacional – 2017
- Iago Falque – América – 2022–2023

=== Switzerland ===
- Johan Vonlanthen – Itagüí – 2011–2012

=== Yugoslavia (Socialist Federal Republic of Yugoslavia) ===
- Dragoslav Šekularac – Santa Fe, Atlético Bucaramanga, Millonarios, América – 1969–1971, 1972, 1973, 1974
- Zvonko Monsider – Samarios – 1951–1952
- Milos Dragolovich – Samarios – 1951
- Miran Uram – Junior – 1951
- Antony Franjic – Boca Juniors de Cali, América de Cali – 1954
- Tony Katalenic – América de Cali – 1954
- Janko Sanković – Santa Fe, Deportes Quindío – 1970–1974
- Radoslav Bečejac – Santa Fe – 1973
- Ratomic Musikiv – Santa Fe – 1974
- Josip Tiplajas – Santa Fe – 1974
- Sivorad Screbrich – América de Cali – 1974
- Predrag Bubanja – América de Cali – 1974
- Jovna Jaydokovic – América de Cali – 1975
- Mihailo Jezevik – América de Cali – 1975
- Radovan Birovllev – América de Cali – 1975
- Dussan Sopic – América de Cali – 1975–1976

== North, Central America and Caribbean (CONCACAF) ==
=== Canada ===
- Sérgio Clyde Rodríguez – Expreso Rojo – 2012
- David Monsalve – América – 2015
- Emilio Reuben – Deportivo Cali, América – 1947–1949

=== Costa Rica ===
- Carlos Alvarado Villalobos – América – 1947–1948, 1950
- Max Villalobos – Cúcuta Deportivo – 1953
- Juan Pablo Vargas – Millonarios – 2020–present
- Rolando Fonseca – Independiente Medellín, América – 1996, 1997
- Francisco Rodríguez – Deportes Tolima, Águilas Doradas – 2020, 2022
- José Guillermo Ortiz – Millonarios, Deportes Tolima– 2019–2020, 2021
- Juan Carlos Arguedas – Atlético Bucaramanga – 1995
- Chale Silva – Universidad, Once Deportivo, Deportivo Manizales – 1948–1952
- Ariel Soto – Boyacá Chicó – 2016–2017
- Claudio Jara – Atlético Bucaramanga – 1994
- José Rafael Meza – Universidad – 1950
- Jhonny Acosta – Águilas Doradas – 2018

=== El Salvador ===
- Junior Burgos – Jaguares de Córdoba – 2015

=== Guatemala ===
- Alejandro Galindo – Atlético Juventud, Santa Fe – 2009–2010, 2011–2012
- Ricardo Jerez, Jr. – Alianza Petrolera, Deportivo Cali – 2012–2017, 2017–

=== Honduras ===
- Junior Sandoval – Jaguares de Córdoba – 2015

=== Mexico ===
- Jesús Soto – Alianza Petrolera – 2008
- Sergio Blancas – Expreso Rojo – 2013
- Mario García – Boyacá Chicó, Deportes Quindío – 2006–2012, 2013, 2014–2015
- Erik Reyna – Valledupar F.C. – 2013

=== Nicaragua ===
- Luis Copete – La Equidad – 2009

=== Panama ===
- Renán Addles – Atlético Huila – 2008
- Edwin Aguilar – América, Real Cartagena – 2010, 2011
- Abdiel Arroyo – Deportes Tolima – 2016
- Felipe Baloy – Envigado, Independiente Medellín, Rionegro Águilas – 2001–2002, 2003, 2016
- Nelson Barahona – Atlético Huila, Independiente Medellín, Itagüí, Alianza Petrolera – 2009, 2010–2012, 2012, 2013, 2014, 2015–2016
- Anthony Basile – Centauros Villavicencio – 2005
- Roberto Chen – Rionegro Águilas – 2016
- Gabriel Gómez – Envigado, Deportivo Pasto, Deportivo Pereira, Santa Fe, La Equidad, Junior, Deportes Tolima, Atlético Bucaramanga – 2001–2003, 2004, 2005, 2006–2007, 2011, 2013, 2016, 2017–2019
- Amílcar Henríquez – Atlético Huila, Independiente Medellín, Real Cartagena, América – 2009–2012, 2012–2014, 2015, 2015–2016
- Roderick Miller – Atlético Nacional – 2016–2017
- Valentín Pimentel – La Equidad – 2016–2017
- Luis Tejada – Deportes Tolima, Envigado, Once Caldas, América, Millonarios – 2003, 2004, 2006, 2007–2008, 2008–2009
- Gabriel Torres – La Equidad, América, Atlético Huila – 2008, 2009, 2009, 2010
- Román Torres – Cortuluá, La Equidad, Junior, Atlético Nacional, Millonarios – 2006, 2007–2009, 2010, 2011, 2012–2015
- Alejandro Vélez – Cortuluá, Atlético Huila – 2010, 2012

=== Trinidad and Tobago ===
- Clyde Leon – Itagüí – 2011

=== United States ===
- Jorge Acosta – Deportivo Cali – 1991–1995
- Juan Agudelo – Millonarios – 2010
- Carlos Llamosa – Atlético Huila – 1990–1991

== South America (CONMEBOL) ==
=== Bolivia ===
- Diego Cabrera – Cúcuta Deportivo, Independiente Medellín, Deportivo Pasto, Deportes Tolima, Santa Fe, Itagüí – 2008, 2009, 2010, 2010, 2011, 2012, 2013
- Marco Etcheverry – América – 1995
- Leonardo Fernández – Atlético Nacional – 2005
- Luis Haquín - Deportivo Cali – 2023
- Alcides Peña – Atlético Bucaramanga – 2016–2017
- Juan Manuel Peña – Santa Fe – 1993–1996
- Carlos Trucco – Deportivo Cali – 1990–1991
- Víctor Ugarte – Once Caldas – 1959–1961
- Joselito Vaca – Deportivo Pasto – 2012

=== Brazil ===
- Anselmo de Almeida – Deportivo Pereira, Independiente Medellín, Junior – 2008–2009, 2009–2010, 2011–2012, 2013
- Alfredo Pereira – Santa Fe – 1961
- Arílson – Santa Fe – 2004
- Armando Miranda – Junior – 1970–1972
- Ary Goncalvez – Santa Fe – 1966
- Aylton Peixoto – Santa Fe –
- Aírton dos Santos – Junior, Millonarios – 1968–1970
- Bahiano – Santa Fe –
- Casimiro Marin – Santa Fe – 1963
- Claudionor Cardozo – Santa Fe – 1965–1968
- Eduardo Ghilio – Santa Fe – 1979
- Eduardo Lima – Millonarios, Junior – 1965–1968
- Flodoaldo Soarez – Santa Fe – 1965
- Garrincha – Junior – 1968
- Gelson Viera – Santa Fe – 1966
- Guilherme Barbosa – Deportivo Pereira – 2007
- Heleno de Freitas – Junior – 1949–1950
- Jair Gómez dos Santos – Santa Fe –
- Joao Carlos de Araujo – Santa Fe – 1965
- Jose Marin – Santa Fe – 1963–1965
- Luis Carlos França – Santa Fe – 1966
- Marcelo Ramos – Atlético Nacional – 2005–2007
- Milton Netto – Santa Fe – 1965
- Nadyr Pretes – Santa Fe – 1966
- Newton López – Santa Fe – 1966
- Odymar Dos Santos – Santa Fe –
- Pipico – Santa Fe –
- Roberto Mainente – Santa Fe – 1963
- Ronaille Calheira – Deportes Quindío, América, Atlético Huila – 2008, 2011, 2011
- Sapuca – Santa Fe –
- Tim – Junior – 1950–1951
- Toninho Dos Santos – Deportivo Cali, Atlético Bucaramanga – 1996, 1996
- Valdomiro – Millonarios – 1980–1981
- Víctor Ephanor – Junior, Independiente Medellín, Unión Magdalena – 1972, 1974–1975, 1976, 1984
- Waldinho Ferreyra – Santa Fe – 1966
- Waltinho – Santa Fe – 1966–1969, 1971–1973
- Wilson Pimentel – Santa Fe – 1963

=== Ecuador ===
- Daniel Angulo – Santa Fe – 2015–2016
- Nicolás Asencio – Millonarios – 2001
- Jimmy Blandón – Millonarios – 1998
- Iván Hurtado – Atlético Nacional, Millonarios – 2007, 2008–2009
- Edwin Tenorio – Deportivo Pereira – 2009–2010

=== Peru ===
- Ronald Baroni – Deportivo Cali – 1999–2002
- Juan José Barros – Deportivo Cali – 1997
- Félix Castillo – América – 1950–1951
- César Cueto – Atlético Nacional – 1978–1983
- Guillermo La Rosa – Atlético Nacional – 1979–1983
- Miguel Loayza – Deportivo Cali – 1969–1970
- Valeriano López – Deportivo Cali – 1949–1950, 1961
- Juan Carlos Mariño – Atlético Nacional, Deportivo Cali – 2009, 2009
- Roberto Merino – Deportes Tolima – 2013
- Franco Navarro – Independiente Medellín – 1984–1986
- Percy Olivares – Deportivo Cali – 1991–1992
- Roberto Palacios – Deportivo Cali – 2004–2005
- Hugo Sotil – Independiente Medellín – 1979–1980
- Julio César Uribe – Junior, América, Independiente Medellín, Envigado – 1986, 1987, 1989, 1992, 1992

== Notes ==
1. Born in Argentina
2. Born in Brazil
3. Born in Colombia
4. Born in Uruguay
5. Capped for the Argentina national football team
6. Capped for the Colombia national under-20 football team
7. Capped for the Spain national under-18 football team
