= 1969 Copa Libertadores =

10th season of Copa Libertadores

1969 Copa Libertadores de América
Tournament details
- Dates: January 31 - May 22
- Teams: 17 (from 9 confederations)

Final positions
- Champions: (Argentina) Estudiantes (LP) (2nd title)
- Runners-up: (Uruguay) Nacional

Tournament statistics
- Matches played: 74
- Goals scored: 211 (2.85 per match)
- Top scorer: (Uruguay) Alberto Ferrero (8 goals)

The 1969 Copa Libertadores de América was the 10th edition of the Copa Libertadores, a football competition contested between the top clubs of the CONMEBOL federation. Estudiantes de la Plata won the competition defeating Nacional 4–0 on points over two-legs. The CBD declared that no Brazilian club would play in the 1969 Copa Libertadores de América, since Brazil disagreed on the format of the tournament, whose dates would conflict with the preparation of the national team for the 1970 World Cup Qualifying matches.

== Qualified teams ==
Country	Team	Qualification method
CONMEBOL; 1 berth	Estudiantes (LP)	1968 Copa Libertadores de América winners
Argentina; 2 berths	None	
Argentina; 2 berths	None	
Bolivia; 2 berths	Bolívar	1968 Primera División champion
Bolivia; 2 berths	Litoral	1968 Primera División runner-up
Brazil; 2 berths	None	
Brazil; 2 berths	None	
Chile; 2 berths	Santiago Wanderers	1968 Primera División champion
Chile; 2 berths	Universidad Católica	1968 Primera División runner-up
Colombia; 2 berths	Unión Magdalena	1968 Campeonato Profesional champion
Colombia; 2 berths	Deportivo Cali	1968 Campeonato Profesional runner-up
Ecuador; 2 berths	Deportivo Quito	1968 Campeonato Ecuatoriano Serie A champion
Ecuador; 2 berths	Barcelona	1968 Campeonato Ecuatoriano Serie A runner-up
Paraguay; 2 berths	Olimpia	1968 Primera División champion
Paraguay; 2 berths	Cerro Porteño	1968 Primera División runner-up
Peru; 2 berths	Sporting Cristal	1968 Torneo Descentralizado champion
Peru; 2 berths	Juan Aurich	1968 Torneo Descentralizado runner-up
Uruguay; 2 berths	Peñarol	1968 Primera División champion
Uruguay; 2 berths	Nacional	1968 Primera División runner-up
Venezuela; 2 berths	Unión Deportiva Canarias	1968 Primera División champion
Venezuela; 2 berths	Deportivo Italia	1968 Primera División runner-up

== Draw ==
The champions and runners-up of each football association were drawn into the same group along with another football association's participating teams. One club from Argentina competed as Estudiantes (LP) was champion of the 1968 Copa Libertadores. They entered the tournament in the Semifinals.

Group 1	Group 2	Group 3	Group 4
Colombia; Venezuela	Chile; Peru	Bolivia; Paraguay	Ecuador; Uruguay

== Group stage ==
=== Group 1 ===
Pos	Team	Pld	W	D	L	GF	GA	GD	Pts	Qualification	(Colombia) CAL	(Venezuela) ITA	(Colombia) MAG	(Venezuela) CAN
1	(Colombia) Deportivo Cali	6	3	2	1	12	6	+6	8	Qualified to the Second round		3–0	3–1	2–0
2	(Venezuela) Deportivo Italia	6	3	1	2	7	8	−1	7	Qualified to the Second round	2–1		2–0	2–0
3	(Colombia) Unión Magdalena	6	2	1	3	7	8	−1	5		2–2	3–0		1–0
4	(Venezuela) Unión Deportiva Canarias	6	1	2	3	3	7	−4	4		1–1	1–1	1–0	

=== Group 2 ===
Pos	Team	Pld	W	D	L	GF	GA	GD	Pts	(Chile) WAN	(Peru) CRI	(Chile) CAT	(Peru) JA
1	(Chile) Santiago Wanderers	6	3	0	3	13	10	+3	6		2–0	2–3	4–1
2	(Peru) Sporting Cristal	6	2	2	2	11	11	0	6	2–1		2–0	3–3
3	(Chile) Universidad Católica	6	3	0	3	12	13	−1	6	1–3	3–2		1–2
4	(Peru) Juan Aurich	6	2	2	2	13	15	−2	6	3–1	2–2	2–4	

==== Tiebreakers ====
- Note: After 6 matches, there was a quadruple tie. So, there were two extra rounds as tiebreaker.

Pos	Team	Pld	W	D	L	GF	GA	GD	Pts	Qualification	(Chile) CAT	(Chile) WAN	(Peru) CRI	(Peru) JA
1	(Chile) Universidad Católica	2	2	0	0	6	2	+4	4	Qualified to the Second round				4–1
2	(Chile) Santiago Wanderers	2	1	1	0	2	1	+1	3	Qualified to the Second round			1–1	
3	(Peru) Sporting Cristal	2	0	1	1	2	3	−1	1		1–2			
4	(Peru) Juan Aurich	2	0	0	2	1	5	−4	0			0–1		

=== Group 3 ===
Pos	Team	Pld	W	D	L	GF	GA	GD	Pts	Qualification	(Paraguay) CER	(Paraguay) OLI	(Bolivia) BOL	(Bolivia) LIT
1	(Paraguay) Cerro Porteño	6	4	1	1	15	5	+10	9	Qualified to the Second round		4–1	1–1	6–0
2	(Paraguay) Olimpia	6	3	1	2	12	7	+5	7	Qualified to the Second round	1–2		4–0	2–0
3	(Bolivia) Bolívar	6	2	3	1	6	8	−2	7		2–1	1–1		1–0
4	(Bolivia) Litoral	6	0	1	5	1	14	−13	1		0–1	0–3	1–1	

==== Tiebreaker ====
Team 1	Score	Team 2
Olimpia (Paraguay)	2–1	(Bolivia) Bolívar

=== Group 4 ===
Pos	Team	Pld	W	D	L	GF	GA	GD	Pts	Qualification	(Uruguay) PEÑ	(Uruguay) NAC	(Ecuador) QUI	(Ecuador) BAR
1	(Uruguay) Peñarol	6	3	3	0	16	8	+8	9	Qualified to the Second round		1–1	5–2	5–2
2	(Uruguay) Nacional	6	2	4	0	10	4	+6	8	Qualified to the Second round	2–2		4–0	2–0
3	(Ecuador) Deportivo Quito	6	1	3	2	4	10	−6	5		1–1	0–0		1–0
4	(Ecuador) Barcelona	6	0	2	4	3	11	−8	2		0–2	1–1	0–0	

== Second round ==
=== Group 1 ===
Pos	Team	Pld	W	D	L	GF	GA	GD	Pts	Qualification	(Chile) CAT	(Paraguay) CER	(Venezuela) ITA
1	(Chile) Universidad Católica	4	2	1	1	7	3	+4	5	Qualified to the Semi-finals		1–0	4–0
2	(Paraguay) Cerro Porteño	4	1	2	1	1	1	0	4		0–0		1–0
3	(Venezuela) Deportivo Italia	4	1	1	2	3	7	−4	3		3–2	0–0	

=== Group 2 ===
Pos	Team	Pld	W	D	L	GF	GA	GD	Pts	Qualification	(Uruguay) NAC	(Colombia) CAL	(Chile) WAN
1	(Uruguay) Nacional	4	3	1	0	10	2	+8	7	Qualified to the Semi-finals		2–0	2–0
2	(Colombia) Deportivo Cali	4	1	1	2	9	11	−2	3		1–5		5–1
3	(Chile) Santiago Wanderers	4	0	2	2	5	11	−6	2		1–1	3–3	

=== Group 3 ===
Pos	Team	Pld	W	D	L	GF	GA	GD	Pts	Qualification	(Uruguay) PEÑ	(Paraguay) OLI
1	(Uruguay) Peñarol	2	1	1	0	2	1	+1	3	Qualified to the Semi-finals		1–1
2	(Paraguay) Olimpia	2	0	1	1	1	2	−1	1		0–1	

== Semi-finals ==
Team 1	Agg.	Team 2	1st leg	2nd leg
Universidad Católica (Chile)	2–6	(Argentina) Estudiantes (LP)	1–3	1–3
Nacional (Uruguay)	2–1	(Uruguay) Peñarol	2–0	0–1

=== Tiebreaker ===
- Nacional qualify due to better goal difference in the three matches.

Team 1	Score	Team 2
Nacional (Uruguay)	0–0	(Uruguay) Peñarol

== Finals ==
Team 1	Agg.	Team 2	1st leg	2nd leg
Nacional (Uruguay)	0–3	(Argentina) Estudiantes (LP)	0–1	0–2

== Champion ==
Copa Libertadores de América
1969 Champion

Estudiantes (LP)
Second Title
