= Walter Wider =

Swiss footballer (born 1937)

Personal information
- Full name: Walter Wider
- Date of birth: 5 March 1937 (age 89)
- Place of birth: Switzerland
- Position: Goalkeeper

Senior career*
Years	Team	Apps	(Gls)
1952–1953	FC Biel-Bienne		
1953–1958	FC Solothurn	86	(0)
1958–1959	FC Basel	2	(0)
- * Club domestic league appearances and goals

Walter Wider (born 5 March 1937) is a Swiss former football goalkeeper who played in the 1950s.

Wider first played for Biel-Bienne in the second tier of Swiss football and during the 1953–1954 season he transferred to FC Solothurn, second-tier club at that time. He played here for five seasons.

Wider then joined FC Basel's first team for their 1958–59 season under manager Rudi Strittich. After playing in three test games, Wider played his domestic league debut for his new club in the first game of the season, on 31 August 1958, as Basel were defeated 1–2 by La Chaux-de-Fonds. Wider also played the next match at home in the Landhof as Basel were defeated 1–4 by Grenchen. These were the only two league games that he played for the club. He played in two more test games, but was not on any other match card after that and he left the club at the same time as club chairman Jules Düblin replaced manager Strittich through their ex-trainer René Bader at the end of November.

During his few months with the club, Wider played a total of seven games for Basel. These two games were in the Nationalliga A and the other five were friendly games.

== Sources ==
- Die ersten 125 Jahre. Publisher: Josef Zindel im Friedrich Reinhardt Verlag, Basel. ISBN 978-3-7245-2305-5
- Verein "Basler Fussballarchiv" Homepage
