= Jean-Jacques Maurer =

Swiss footballer (1931-1990)

Personal information
- Full name: Jean-Jacques Maurer
- Date of birth: 25 February 1931
- Date of death: 19 November 1990 (aged 59)
- Position: Midfielder

Senior career*
Years	Team	Apps	(Gls)
1949–1950	Young Boys	3	(3)
1950–1951	Servette FC	4	(0)
1951–1957	FC Lausanne-Sport	101	(15)
1957–1958	FC Biel-Bienne	5	(3)
1958–1960	FC Basel	35	(5)
1960–1961	Servette FC	0	(0)

International career
1956	Switzerland	2	(0)
- * Club domestic league appearances and goals

Jean-Jacques Maurer (25 February 1931 – 19 November 1990) was a Swiss footballer who played during the 1950s. He played as midfielder.

== Career ==
Maurer played the 1949–50 season with Young Boys who during that season won promotion to the Nationalliga A. For the following season Maurer transferred to Servette but because he did not get much playing time he moved on to Lausanne-Sport just one year later. Here he stayed for six seasons and during this time he was called up for the Swiss national team. In his sixth season by Lausanne-Sport he did not get any playing time due to an injury. He then moved on to Biel-Bienne for the 1957–58 Nationalliga A to strengthen the squad who had just achieved promotion, however, at the end of the season the team suffered relegation.

Maurer then joined FC Basel's first team for their 1958–59 season under manager Rudi Strittich. After playing in four test games, Maurer played his domestic league debut for his new club in the second game of the season, on 6 September 1958, in the home game at the Landhof as Basel were defeated 1–4 by Grenchen. He scored his first goal for his club on 23 November 1958 in the home game as Basel were defeated 2–4 by Grasshopper Club.

Between the years 1958 and 1960 Maurer played a total of 56 games for Basel scoring a total of five goals. 35 of these games were in the Nationalliga A, three in the Swiss Cup and 18 were friendly games. He scored his five goals all in the domestic league.

Following his time with Basel, Maurer returned to Servette and ended his active football career.

== Sources ==
- Rotblau: Jahrbuch Saison 2017/2018. Publisher: FC Basel Marketing AG. ISBN 978-3-7245-2189-1
- Die ersten 125 Jahre. Publisher: Josef Zindel im Friedrich Reinhardt Verlag, Basel. 2018. ISBN 978-3-7245-2305-5
- Verein "Basler Fussballarchiv" Homepage
