= Fredy Kehrli =

Swiss footballer (1935-2008)

Personal information
- Full name: Alfred "Fredy" Kehrli
- Date of birth: 21 September 1935
- Date of death: 13 October 2008 (aged 73)
- Place of death: Biel-Bienne
- Positions: Defender; midfielder

Senior career*
Years	Team	Apps	(Gls)
1954–1958	Biel-Bienne	88	(1)
1958–1959	Basel	23	(0)
1959–1967	Biel-Bienne	175	(0)
- * Club domestic league appearances and goals

Fredy Kehrli (21 September 1935 – 13 October 2008) was a Swiss footballer who played in the 1950s and 1960s. He played mainly in the position as defender, but also as midfielder.

Kehrli first played for Biel-Bienne in the second tier of Swiss football. In the 1956–1957 Kehrli and the team won promotion to the Nationalliga A. But at the end of the season the team suffered relegation.

Kehrli then joined FC Basel's first team for their 1958–59 season under manager Rudi Strittich. After playing in three test games, Kehrli played his domestic league debut for his new club in the first game of the season, on 31 August 1958, as Basel were defeated 1–2 by La Chaux-de-Fonds. In his one season with the club, Kehrli played a total of 33 games for Basel without scoring a goal. 23 of these games were in the Nationalliga A, one in the Swiss Cup and nine were friendly games.

Following his time with Basel, Kehrli returned to his club of origin Biel-Bienne who had again achieved promotion. Here Kehrli played until he ended his active football career. Kehrli lived in his home town Biel-Bienne until the end of his days.

== Sources ==
- Die ersten 125 Jahre. Publisher: Josef Zindel im Friedrich Reinhardt Verlag, Basel. ISBN 978-3-7245-2305-5
- Verein "Basler Fussballarchiv" Homepage
