= Charles Turin =

Swiss footballer (born 1933)

Personal information
- Full name: Charles Turin
- Date of birth: 1 June 1933 (age 93)
- Place of birth: Oberwil, Switzerland
- Position: Midfielder

Youth career
- FC Oberwil

Senior career*
| Years | Team | Apps | (Gls) |
| 1954–1955 | FC Concordia Basel | | |
| 1955–1958 | FC Biel-Bienne | 45 | (4) |
| 1958–1959 | FC Basel | 4 | (0) |
| 1959–1963 | FC Biel-Bienne | 53 | (4) |
- * Club domestic league appearances and goals

Charles Turin (born 1 June 1933) is a Swiss former footballer who played in the 1950s and 1960s. He played as midfielder.

Born in Oberwil, Basel-Landschaft Turin played his youth football by local club FC Oberwil and then moved on to higher classed Concordia Basel. In the summer of 1955 he moved on to play for Biel-Bienne in the Nationalliga B (second highest tier in Swiss football. At the end of the 1956–57 season Turin with Biel won the championship and were promoted. But at the end of the following season they were relegated.

At this point Turin joined FC Basel's first team for their 1958–59 season und manager Rudi Strittich. After four test games Turin played his debut for the club in the Swiss Cup home game at the Landhof on 26 October as Basel won 3–0 against local team Old Boys. Turin played his domestic league debut for the club in the away game on 7 December as Basel were beaten 0–1 by Young Fellows Zürich.

Turin never advanced to become a regular in the team and only stayed this one season with them. Turin played a total of 12 games for Basel scoring one goal. Four of these games were in the Nationalliga A, one in the Swiss Cup and the other seven were friendly games. He scored his goal in the test game against Vevey-Sports.

Turin then returned to Biel-Bienne, who in the meantime, had again won promotion, and he remained with them until the end of his active football career.

== Sources ==
- Die ersten 125 Jahre. Publisher: Josef Zindel im Friedrich Reinhardt Verlag, Basel. ISBN 978-3-7245-2305-5
- Verein "Basler Fussballarchiv" Homepage
