= René Jaeck =

Swiss footballer (1937–2018)

Personal information
- Full name: René Jaeck
- Date of birth: 31 July 1937
- Place of birth: Switzerland
- Date of death: 2 June 2018 (aged 80)
- Place of death: Allschwil Switzerland
- Position: Midfielder

Senior career*
Years	Team	Apps	(Gls)
1957–1958	FC Schaffhausen		
1958–1961	FC Basel	16	(1)
- * Club domestic league appearances and goals

René Jaeck (31 July 1937 – 2 June 2018) was a Swiss footballer who played in the late 1950s and early 1960s as midfielder.

Jaeck first played for Schaffhausen in the second tier of Swiss football. He then joined FC Basel's first team for their 1958–59 season under manager Rudi Strittich. After playing in three test games, Jaeck played his debut for his new club in the Swiss Cup home match at the Landhof on 28 October 1958 as Basel won 3–0 against local club Old Boys.

He played his domestic league debut for the club in the following season. This was the first match of the new season, on 23 August 1959 as Basel lost the away game 2–3 against Grenchen. He scored his first goal for the club on 5 June 1960 in the away game as Basel won 4–2 against Lugano.

Between the years 1958 and 1961 Jaeck played a total of 34 games for Basel scoring a total of four goals. 16 of these games were in the Nationalliga A, four in the Swiss Cup and 14 were friendly games. He scored one goal in the domestic league and the other three were scored during the test games.

== Sources ==
- Die ersten 125 Jahre. Publisher: Josef Zindel im Friedrich Reinhardt Verlag, Basel. ISBN 978-3-7245-2305-5
- Verein "Basler Fussballarchiv" Homepage
