= Alberto Ferrero =

Alberto Ferrero may refer to:

- Alberto Ferrero (general) (1885–1969), Italian general
- Alberto Ferrero (footballer) (born 1944), Chilean forward

== See also ==
- Albert Ferrer (born 1970), Spanish footballer
