= 1968 Campeonato Profesional =

Campeonato Profesional
- Season: 1968
- Champions: Unión Magdalena (1st title)
- Copa Libertadores: Deportivo Cali; Unión Magdalena
- Top goalscorer: José María Ferrero (32 goals)

The 1968 Campeonato Profesional was the 20th season of Colombia's top-flight football league. 14 teams competed against one another. Unión Magdalena won their first league title.

== Teams ==
Team	City	Stadium
América de Cali	Cali	Estadio Olímpico Pascual Guerrero
Atlético Bucaramanga	Bucaramanga	Estadio Alfonso López
Atlético Nacional	Medellín	Estadio Atanasio Girardot
Cúcuta Deportivo	Cúcuta	Estadio General Santander
Deportes Quindío	Armenia	Estadio San José de Armenia
Deportes Tolima	Ibagué	Estadio Serrano de Ávila
Deportivo Cali	Cali	Estadio Olímpico Pascual Guerrero
Deportivo Pereira	Pereira	Estadio Alberto Mora Mora
Independiente Medellín	Medellín	Estadio Atanasio Girardot
Junior	Barranquilla	Estadio Romelio Martínez
Millonarios	Bogotá	Estadio El Campín
Once Caldas	Manizales	Estadio Fernando Londoño Londoño
Santa Fe	Bogotá	Estadio El Campín
Unión Magdalena	Santa Marta	Estadio Eduardo Santos

== Torneo Apertura ==
=== Standings ===
Pos	Team	Pld	W	D	L	GF	GA	GD	Pts	Qualification or relegation
1	Unión Magdalena	26	15	8	3	43	28	+15	38	1969 Copa Libertadores
2	Deportivo Cali	26	14	8	4	55	34	+21	36	
3	Millonarios	26	14	7	5	56	31	+25	35	
4	Junior	26	14	7	5	52	31	+21	35	
5	Santa Fe	26	13	6	7	57	42	+15	32	
6	América de Cali	26	11	9	6	43	28	+15	31	
7	Independiente Medellín	26	8	12	6	26	27	−1	28	
8	Deportivo Pereira	26	8	9	9	37	38	−1	25	
9	Once Caldas	26	8	7	11	37	43	−6	23	
10	Atlético Bucaramanga	26	9	3	14	36	37	−1	21	
11	Deportes Quindío	26	5	8	13	34	59	−25	18	
12	Atlético Nacional	26	5	6	15	24	47	−23	16	
13	Cúcuta Deportivo	26	2	10	14	26	52	−26	14	
14	Deportes Tolima	26	4	4	18	26	62	−36	12	

Source: RSSSF

=== Results ===
_{Home}\^{Away}	AME	BUC	CAL	CUC	JUN	MAG	DIM	MIL	NAC	ONC	PER	QUI	SFE	TOL
América	—	1–0	1–4	5–0	3–3	3–1	2–1	1–2	1–0	1–1	2–2	5–1	3–1	2–0
Bucaramanga	0–0	—	4–1	2–0	0–1	1–2	1–2	2–0	1–1	3–0	3–3	3–1	2–3	1–0
Cali	2–1	1–0	—	4–0	3–2	3–3	0–0	1–1	5–1	4–1	4–0	3–1	1–0	5–0
Cúcuta	1–1	2–3	0–0	—	0–0	2–2	0–0	2–1	0–0	1–1	0–1	2–1	0–2	3–3
Junior	1–0	2–1	0–0	5–1	—	2–1	2–0	0–1	3–0	5–3	2–1	5–0	2–1	5–1
Magdalena	1–0	2–1	1–1	2–1	3–1	—	1–0	1–0	4–0	2–0	1–1	3–0	1–1	3–0
Medellín	2–2	1–0	0–1	2–0	2–2	1–1	—	0–0	1–0	1–0	3–3	1–1	0–0	2–1
Millonarios	0–2	4–3	4–0	3–2	3–2	2–2	5–1	—	3–0	5–1	1–0	3–1	5–1	6–1
Nacional	0–0	0–2	0–1	2–1	4–1	2–4	0–0	1–1	—	0–0	1–0	2–4	1–2	3–0
Caldas	0–0	2–1	2–1	2–0	0–0	1–2	1–2	3–0	3–0	—	4–2	2–2	1–2	3–1
Pereira	0–2	2–1	1–1	1–1	1–1	3–1	1–1	1–1	1–0	4–2	—	3–0	1–2	1–0
Quindío	1–1	1–0	4–4	4–2	0–1	2–2	0–1	0–2	2–3	1–1	2–1	—	2–2	0–0
Santa Fe	1–3	5–0	6–3	5–3	2–2	1–3	1–1	1–1	3–2	2–3	1–0	7–0	—	3–2
Tolima	3–1	0–1	1–2	2–2	0–4	1–3	2–1	2–2	4–1	1–0	1–3	0–3	0–2	—

== Torneo Finalización ==
=== Standings ===
Pos	Team	Pld	W	D	L	GF	GA	GD	Pts	Qualification or relegation
1	Deportivo Cali	26	14	10	2	50	27	+23	38	1969 Copa Libertadores
2	América de Cali	26	15	6	5	46	26	+20	36	
3	Junior	26	16	3	7	56	37	+19	35	
4	Millonarios	26	12	8	6	46	32	+14	32	
5	Once Caldas	26	11	7	8	47	42	+5	29	
6	Atlético Bucaramanga	26	12	5	9	38	36	+2	29	
7	Santa Fe	26	10	6	10	45	47	−2	26	
8	Independiente Medellín	26	9	7	10	32	37	−5	25	
9	Atlético Nacional	26	9	6	11	34	29	+5	24	
10	Unión Magdalena	26	9	5	12	34	45	−11	23	
11	Cúcuta Deportivo	26	6	10	10	27	29	−2	22	
12	Deportes Tolima	26	5	7	14	25	44	−19	17	
13	Deportivo Pereira	26	3	10	13	38	51	−13	16	
14	Deportes Quindío	26	5	2	19	26	61	−35	12	

Source: RSSSF

Source: RSSSF.com Colombia 1968

=== Results ===
_{Home}\^{Away}	AME	BUC	CAL	CUC	JUN	MAG	DIM	MIL	NAC	ONC	PER	QUI	SFE	TOL
América	—	0–0	1–2	1–0	1–1	2–1	3–1	2–1	1–0	2–1	2–1	3–1	4–1	4–1
Bucaramanga	2–1	—	4–3	1–1	0–1	2–1	2–1	4–1	2–0	0–2	3–2	2–0	1–1	2–1
Cali	2–1	1–0	—	0–0	2–2	2–0	2–0	1–0	2–0	1–1	2–2	4–1	3–1	2–2
Cúcuta	1–0	4–0	1–1	—	1–2	3–2	2–2	1–1	0–1	3–1	0–0	1–0	1–1	0–0
Junior	2–4	2–1	2–1	3–2	—	3–2	2–0	3–0	1–0	4–1	5–2	2–0	2–3	3–2
Magdalena	0–0	1–1	0–2	1–0	2–3	—	2–4	1–1	2–1	3–1	4–1	1–0	2–0	1–1
Medellín	0–0	3–5	2–2	1–0	2–1	2–2	—	0–1	0–1	1–1	1–0	1–3	1–1	1–0
Millonarios	2–0	0–0	1–1	3–2	2–1	2–0	0–1	—	2–0	3–3	4–0	6–1	3–0	3–1
Nacional	0–1	4–1	1–1	1–1	0–0	3–0	1–2	1–2	—	1–1	0–0	3–0	3–1	3–2
Caldas	0–2	1–0	1–2	3–1	4–2	2–0	2–1	1–1	2–1	—	1–0	4–1	1–1	3–1
Pereira	1–1	0–2	1–4	2–0	1–2	7–0	2–2	3–3	0–2	2–2	—	5–2	1–3	2–2
Quindío	1–3	2–1	1–2	1–1	2–1	0–1	0–1	2–2	1–5	3–4	1–0	—	0–1	1–2
Santa Fe	3–6	3–0	2–2	0–1	1–5	1–3	1–0	1–2	4–2	4–3	1–1	5–0	—	3–0
Tolima	1–1	0–2	0–3	1–0	1–0	1–2	0–2	2–0	0–0	2–1	2–2	0–1	0–2	—

== Third Place ==
Team 1	Agg.	Team 2	1st leg	2nd leg
Millonarios	6–5	Junior	2–1	4–4

== Final ==
Team 1	Agg.	Team 2	1st leg	2nd leg
Deportivo Cali	2–3	Unión Magdalena	0–1	2–2
