= Julio Ulises Terra =

Uruguayan footballer (1920-1985)

Personal information
- Full name: Julio Ulises Terra Guerra
- Date of birth: 1920 20 September
- Place of birth: Uruguay
- Date of death: 31 October 1985 (aged 64–65)
- Place of death: Cúcuta, Colombia
- Position: Defender

Senior career*
Years	Team	Apps	(Gls)
–	River Plate de Montevideo		
1948	San Lorenzo	8	(0)
1950–1953	Cúcuta Deportivo	107	(3)
1954–1957	Atlético Nacional	65	(3)
1958–1959	Cúcuta Deportivo	71	(8)
1960–1962	Independiente Medellín	24	(0)
1965	Cúcuta Deportivo	7	(0)
–	Loyola Sport		
1967	Cúcuta Deportivo	2	(0)

International career
1947	Uruguay	3	(0)
- * Club domestic league appearances and goals

Julio Ulises Terra Guerra (1920 - 31 October 1985) was a Uruguayan football defender. He played in one match for the Uruguay national football team in 1947. He was also part of Uruguay's squad for the 1947 South American Championship.

== Career ==
Terra began playing football in Uruguay with River Plate de Montevideo. He had a brief spell in the Argentina Primera Division with San Lorenzo de Almagro during 1948, before moving to Colombia where he would finish his career.

In 1950, Terra joined Cúcuta Deportivo, the club where he spent most of his remaining career and where he would become the oldest player in Colombian league history at the age of 45 years and 5 months. Terra also played for Atlético Nacional and Independiente Medellín. In 1954, he won the Colombian league with Atlético Nacional.

Terra played for the Uruguay national football team in the 1947 South American Championship.

== Personal ==
Terra died at his home in Cúcuta, Colombia at age 63.
