= Fernando Batiste =

Argentine footballer

Personal information
- Full name: Fernando Nicolás Batiste
- Date of birth: March 11, 1984 (age 42)
- Place of birth: Tacural, Santa Fe, Argentina
- Height: 1.78 m (5 ft 10 in)
- Position: Defender

Senior career*
Years	Team	Apps	(Gls)
2003–2009	San José	86	(3)
2007	→ Aurora (loan)	26	(5)
2009	América	3	(0)
2010	Bucaramanga	14	(1)
2011	Fortaleza	22	(0)
2011–2012	Águilas Doradas Rionegro		
2012–2017	Deportivo Pereira	121	(10)
2013–2014	→ La Equidad (loan)	51	(1)
2018–2019	Unión Magdalena	42	(2)
- * Club domestic league appearances and goals

Fernando Nicolás Batiste (born March 11, 1984) is a former Argentine footballer who played for last in Colombian Categoría Primera A club Union Magdalena.

He previously played for Bolivian clubs San José (2003–2006, 2008–2009) and Aurora (2007) and for Colombian clubs América de Cali (2009), Atlético Bucaramanga (2010), Fortaleza F.C. (2011), Itagüí Ditaires (2011–2012), Deportivo Pereira (2012, 2015–2017) and La Equidad 2013–2014).
