= 1968 Campeonato Nacional Primera División =

Chilean football division

Campeonato Profesional de Fútbol
- Dates: 27 April 1968 – 11 January 1969
- Champions: Santiago Wanderers (2nd title)
- Relegated: Unión San Felipe
- 1969 Copa Libertadores: Santiago Wanderers; Universidad Católica (Play-off Winners)
- Matches: 325
- Goals: 1,018 (3.13 per match)
- Top goalscorer: Eladio Zárate (32 goals)
- Biggest home win: Unión La Calera 7–0 Rangers (10 November)
- Highest attendance: 70,481 Universidad Católica 0–0 Universidad de Chile (13 November)
- Total attendance: 3,697,921
- Average attendance: 11,378

The 1968 Campeonato Nacional de Futbol Profesional was Chilean first tier’s 36th season. Santiago Wanderers were the champions, winning its second title.

== First stage ==
=== Torneo Metropolitano ===
Pos	Team	Pld	W	D	L	GF	GA	GD	Pts	Qualification
1	Universidad de Chile	14	9	1	4	34	18	+16	19	Qualified to Torneo Nacional
2	Audax Italiano	14	5	7	2	26	23	+3	17	Qualified to Torneo Nacional
3	Universidad Católica	14	5	4	5	17	16	+1	14	Qualified to Torneo Nacional
4	Santiago Morning	14	5	4	5	28	38	−10	14	Qualified to Torneo Nacional
5	Colo-Colo	14	4	5	5	30	25	+5	13	Qualified to 5th-place play-off
6	Unión Española	14	5	3	6	25	24	+1	13	Qualified to 5th-place play-off
7	Palestino	14	4	5	5	23	23	0	13	Qualified to 5th-place play-off
8	Magallanes	14	2	5	7	18	34	−16	9	

Home \ Away	AUDI	COLO	MAGA	PALE	SMOR	UESP	UCAT	UCHI
Audax I.		2–1	2–2	2–2	2–2	5–3	1–0	2–2
Colo-Colo	2–2		3–3	4–2	2–2	0–0	4–0	3–4
Magallanes	1–1	1–6		0–3	3–2	0–1	0–3	2–1
Palestino	2–1	2–4	2–2		3–1	2–2	1–1	1–0
S. Morning	2–2	2–1	5–4	0–0		2–1	4–2	0–5
U. Española	1–2	2–0	3–0	4–3	1–2		1–1	4–2
U. Católica	3–0	0–0	0–0	1–0	5–2	1–0		0–1
U. de Chile	0–2	3–0	2–0	1–0	7–2	4–2	2–0	

Legend: Blue = home team win; Yellow = draw; Red = away team win.

=== 5th-place play-off ===
Pos	Team	Pld	W	D	L	GF	GA	GD	Pts	Qualification
1	Palestino	2	1	1	0	3	1	+2	3	Qualified to Torneo Nacional
2	Colo-Colo	2	1	0	1	4	3	+1	2	
3	Unión Española	2	0	1	1	0	3	−3	1	

Home \ Away	COLO	PALE	UESP
Colo-Colo			3–0
Palestino	3–1		
U. Española		0–0	

Legend: Blue = home team win; Yellow = draw; Red = away team win.

=== Torneo Provincial ===
Pos	Team	Pld	W	D	L	GF	GA	GD	Pts	Qualification
1	Deportes Concepción	18	8	7	3	23	12	+11	23	Qualified to Torneo Nacional
2	Santiago Wanderers	18	7	7	4	23	15	+8	21	Qualified to Torneo Nacional
3	Huachipato	18	6	8	4	28	14	+14	20	Qualified to Torneo Nacional
4	Green Cross Temuco	18	8	4	6	21	18	+3	20	Qualified to Torneo Nacional
5	Rangers	18	3	11	4	14	16	−2	17	Qualified to 5th-place play-off
6	Deportes La Serena	18	6	5	7	14	17	−3	17	Qualified to 5th-place play-off
7	Unión La Calera	18	6	5	7	18	25	−7	17	Qualified to 5th-place play-off
8	Everton	18	6	5	7	24	32	−8	17	Qualified to 5th-place play-off
9	Unión San Felipe	18	5	5	8	24	32	−8	15	
10	O'Higgins	18	5	3	10	22	30	−8	13	

Home \ Away	DCON	EVER	GCRT	HUAC	DLSE	OHIG	RANG	USFE	ULCA	SWAN
D. Concepción		2–2	4–0	0–0	2–0	2–1	1–1	2–0	1–0	1–1
Everton	1–1		1–3	0–2	1–0	2–3	2–1	2–0	3–1	1–1
Green Cross T.	2–1	3–2		0–0	1–1	2–0	0–0	2–0	1–0	2–0
Huachipato	0–0	5–0	1–0		0–0	5–1	0–1	1–1	5–0	1–1
D. La Serena	0–1	0–1	1–0	2–1		1–0	1–1	3–0	3–2	1–0
O'Higgins	0–1	1–2	1–0	2–2	3–0		1–1	5–2	1–2	0–1
Rangers	0–2	2–1	1–1	1–1	0–0	1–0		2–2	1–2	1–1
U. San Felipe	1–1	2–2	3–1	1–3	3–1	3–1	1–0		1–0	1–2
U. La Calera	2–1	1–1	2–0	2–1	0–0	1–1	0–0	2–1		0–0
S. Wanderers	0–1	4–0	0–3	2–0	1–0	3–0	0–0	2–2	4–1	

Legend: Blue = home team win; Yellow = draw; Red = away team win.

=== 5th-place play-off ===
Pos	Team	Pld	W	D	L	GF	GA	GD	Pts	Qualification
1	Everton	3	2	0	1	8	3	+5	4	Qualified to Torneo Nacional
2	Deportes La Serena	3	2	0	1	5	3	+2	4	
3	Rangers	3	2	0	1	4	5	−1	4	
4	Unión La Calera	3	0	0	3	2	8	−6	0	

Home \ Away	EVER	DLSE	RANG	ULCA
Everton			5–0	2–1
D. La Serena	2–1		0–1	
Rangers				3–0
U. La Calera		1–3		

Legend: Blue = home team win; Yellow = draw; Red = away team win.

== Second stage ==
=== Torneo Promocional ===
Pos	Team	Pld	W	D	L	GF	GA	GD	Pts	Qualification
1	Colo-Colo	14	9	5	0	37	17	+20	23	Qualified to Serie A
2	Unión Española	14	8	2	4	32	25	+7	18	Qualified to Serie A
3	Magallanes	14	5	6	3	29	24	+5	16	Qualified to Serie A
4	Rangers	14	5	5	4	16	22	−6	15	Qualified to Serie A
5	Unión La Calera	14	4	4	6	27	22	+5	12	
6	Deportes La Serena	14	3	5	6	14	21	−7	11	
7	O'Higgins	14	3	3	8	19	35	−16	9	
8	Unión San Felipe	14	2	4	8	18	26	−8	8	

Home \ Away	COLO	DLSE	MAGA	OHIG	USFE	ULCA	RANG	UESP
Colo-Colo		3–1	2–2	2–2	2–1	4–2	3–1	1–0
D. La Serena	0–3		3–3	1–0	1–1	1–2	0–0	2–1
Magallanes	2–2	2–0		4–2	1–1	2–1	1–2	4–4
O'Higgins	1–6	2–1	1–2		1–1	3–1	0–0	0–2
U. San Felipe	1–3	0–1	3–3	0–2		2–0	3–1	2–3
U. La Calera	2–2	1–0	1–2	6–1	2–1		7–0	2–3
Rangers	1–1	1–1	1–0	4–1	1–0	0–0		2–1
U. Española	1–3	2–2	2–1	5–3	3–1	1–0	4–2	

Legend: Blue = home team win; Yellow = draw; Red = away team win.

== Final stage ==
=== Torneo Nacional ===
Pos	Team	Pld	W	D	L	GF	GA	GD	Pts	Qualification
1	Santiago Wanderers	18	11	3	4	37	20	+17	25	Champions. Qualified to 1969 Copa Libertadores
2	Universidad Católica	18	10	4	4	42	25	+17	24	Qualified to Pre-Copa Libertadores play-off
3	Universidad de Chile	18	9	6	3	31	17	+14	24	Qualified to Pre-Copa Libertadores play-off
4	Palestino	18	7	6	5	37	34	+3	20	
5	Huachipato	18	7	3	8	18	20	−2	17	
6	Audax Italiano	18	5	5	8	20	26	−6	15	
7	Green Cross Temuco	18	5	5	8	29	36	−7	15	
8	Deportes Concepción	18	4	6	8	21	28	−7	14	
9	Santiago Morning	18	5	4	9	32	46	−14	14	
10	Everton	18	4	4	10	20	35	−15	12	

Home \ Away	AUDI	DCON	EVER	GCRT	HUAC	PALE	SMOR	UCAT	UCHI	SWAN
Audax I.		0–1	4–3	1–1	0–3	3–1	2–1	3–2	1–0	3–3
D. Concepción	1–1		2–0	0–0	2–1	1–1	5–2	0–2	0–2	0–1
Everton	1–1	2–0		0–1	0–1	3–3	1–1	2–0	1–3	2–1
Green Cross T.	2–1	2–2	0–0		1–0	0–1	5–0	0–1	1–1	0–3
Huachipato	2–1	1–1	2–0	1–0		0–1	1–1	1–4	0–1	2–1
Palestino	4–3	1–1	4–1	1–2	1–2		3–3	3–3	0–2	3–1
S. Morning	2–2	4–3	4–0	4–2	1–0	0–1		2–1	3–5	0–2
U. Católica	2–0	2–1	5–2	6–2	3–1	5–2	3–2		0–0	2–2
U. de Chile	2–1	2–0	1–2	1–0	0–0	3–3	5–0	1–1		0–2
S. Wanderers	5–2	4–1	2–0	3–1	2–0	0–1	2–1	1–0	2–2	

Legend: Blue = home team win; Yellow = draw; Red = away team win.

=== Serie A ===
Pos	Team	Pld	W	D	L	GF	GA	GD	Pts
1	Colo-Colo	6	5	0	1	24	11	+13	10
2	Unión Española	6	4	1	1	17	10	+7	9
3	Rangers	6	1	1	4	10	15	−5	3
4	Magallanes	6	1	0	5	7	22	−15	2

Home \ Away	COLO	MAGA	RANG	UESP
Colo-Colo		4–3	2–1	3–2
Magallanes	0–6		3–2	1–3
Rangers	1–6	3–0		3–3
U. Española	4–3	4–0	1–0	

Legend: Blue = home team win; Yellow = draw; Red = away team win.

=== Serie B ===
Pos	Team	Pld	W	D	L	GF	GA	GD	Pts	Relegation
1	Deportes La Serena	6	4	0	2	13	9	+4	8	
2	O'Higgins	6	4	0	2	10	8	+2	8	
3	Unión La Calera	6	2	1	3	13	12	+1	5	
4	Unión San Felipe	6	1	1	4	7	14	−7	3	Relegated to 1969 Segunda División de Chile

Home \ Away	OHIG	DLSE	USFE	ULCA
O'Higgins		2–3	2–1	2–1
D. La Serena	1–2		4–0	3–2
U. San Felipe	0–1	2–0		2–5
U. La Calera	2–1	1–2	2–2	

Legend: Blue = home team win; Yellow = draw; Red = away team win.

=== Title ===
Campeonato Profesional
1968 champion
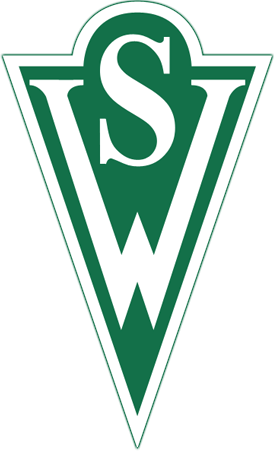
Santiago Wanderers
2nd title

== Pre-Copa Libertadores play-off ==
9 January 1969	Universidad Católica	1 – 0	Universidad de Chile	Estadio Nacional, Santiago
	Livingstone 39'			Attendance: 33,294; Referee: J. Cruzat

11 January 1969	Universidad de Chile	2 – 1	Universidad Católica	Estadio Nacional, Santiago
	Marcos 70'; Hodge 76'		48' Herrera	Attendance: 63,720; Referee: J. Cruzat

Universidad Católica also qualified for the 1969 Copa Libertadores due to better goal difference in the Final stage

== Top goalscorers ==
Rank	Name	Club	Goals
1	(Paraguay) Eladio Zárate	Unión Española	32
2	(Chile) Osvaldo Castro	Unión La Calera	31
3	(Chile) Carlos Reinoso	Audax Italiano	21

== Sources ==
- RSSSF Chile 1968
- Tablas 1968
