= 1968 Campeonato Ecuatoriano de Fútbol Serie A =

Ecuadorian Serie A
- Season: 1968
- Champions: Deportivo Quito

The 1968 Campeonato Ecuatoriano de Fútbol Serie A, the first division of Ecuadorian football (soccer), was played by 12 teams. The champion was Deportivo Quito.

== First stage ==
Pos	Team	Pld	W	D	L	GF	GA	GD	Pts	Qualification
1	Deportivo Quito	22	16	4	2	44	20	+24	36	Qualified to the Liguilla Final
2	Barcelona	22	11	5	6	29	16	+13	27	Qualified to the Liguilla Final
3	Emelec	22	11	5	6	37	27	+10	27	Qualified to the Liguilla Final
4	LDU Quito	22	10	6	6	36	19	+17	26	Qualified to the Liguilla Final
5	Manta	22	8	6	8	26	22	+4	22	Qualified to the Liguilla Final
6	El Nacional	22	6	9	7	29	25	+4	21	Qualified to the Liguilla Final
7	Aucas	22	8	4	10	26	40	−14	20	Qualified to the Liguilla del No Descenso
8	América de Quito	22	6	6	10	27	32	−5	18	Qualified to the Liguilla del No Descenso
9	Everest	22	6	6	10	27	35	−8	18	Qualified to the Liguilla del No Descenso
10	Politécnico	22	5	8	9	28	37	−9	18	Qualified to the Liguilla del No Descenso
11	Macará	22	6	4	12	33	50	−17	16	Qualified to the Liguilla del No Descenso
12	Estibadores Navales	22	5	5	12	31	49	−18	15	Qualified to the Liguilla del No Descenso

Source: RSSSF - 1968 Serie A

== Liguilla No Descenso ==
Pos	Team	Pld	W	D	L	GF	GA	GD	Pts
1	América de Quito	30	10	8	12	39	41	−2	28
2	Everest	30	10	8	12	43	47	−4	28
3	Aucas	30	11	6	13	39	55	−16	28
4	Politécnico	30	8	10	12	35	43	−8	26
5	Macará	30	6	8	16	37	60	−23	20
6	Estibadores Navales	22	5	5	12	31	49	−18	15

== Liguilla Final ==
Pos	Team	Pld	W	D	L	GF	GA	GD	Pts	Qualification
1	Deportivo Quito	32	18	9	5	51	31	+20	45	Champions and Qualified to the 1969 Copa Libertadores
2	Barcelona	32	18	7	7	44	24	+20	43	Qualified to the 1969 Copa Libertadores
3	Emelec	32	16	6	10	48	41	+7	38	
4	LDU Quito	32	14	9	9	53	29	+24	37	
5	El Nacional	32	7	14	11	36	35	+1	28	
6	Manta	32	9	10	13	34	34	0	28	

Source: RSSSF - 1968 Serie A
