= Luigi Di Franco =

Italian footballer (born 1918)

Personal information
- Date of birth: 18 November 1918
- Place of birth: Rome, Kingdom of Italy
- Positions: Midfielder; winger

Senior career*
Years	Team	Apps	(Gls)
1937–1941	Jedinstvo Beograd	4	(0)
1941–1942	SK Jugoslavija		
1942–1943	Venezia	3	(0)
1943–1944	Legnago	11	(0)
1945–1949	Mestrina		
1949–1950	Deportivo Pereira	9	(0)

Managerial career
- 1949–1950: Deportivo Pereira
- * Club domestic league appearances and goals

Luigi Di Franco (born 18 November 1918, date of death unknown) was an Italian footballer.

== Biography ==
Playing as a left winger, Di Franco played in the Yugoslav Championship with SK Jedinstvo Belgrade where he got first registered at January 1937 and played until 1941. In 1941, he moved to a more popular Belgrade club SK Jugoslavija. With the beginning of the Second World War, the national league was divided, and Di Franco (spelled as Di Franko or Difranko in the Serbian press) finished second with SK Jugoslavija in the 1940–41 season.

With the Axis invasion of Yugoslavia, Di Franco returned to Italy, signing with the Serie A side Venezia. They finished the 1942–43 season at 13th place.

At the end of the war, in 1945, Di Franco signed with Mestrina, which was playing in the Serie B. However, at the end of the 1946–47 season, they were relegated to Serie C. Luigi Di Franco stayed with Mestrina until 1949.

Di Franco moved to Colombia to become player-manager of Deportivo Pereira during the 1949 and 1950 seasons.

Di Franco is deceased.
