= Quentin Danloux =

French footballer (born 2001)

Personal information
- Full name: Quentin David Jean Pierre Danloux
- Date of birth: 16 November 2001 (age 24)
- Place of birth: Bordeaux, France
- Height: 1.80 m (5 ft 11 in)
- Position: Midfielder

Team information
- Current team: Patriotas Boyacá
- Number: 8

Youth career
- Elche
- 2018–2019: Kelme

Senior career*
Years	Team	Apps	(Gls)
2019–2020	Novelda	0	(0)
2020–	Patriotas Boyacá	27	(1)
- * Club domestic league appearances and goals as of 6 April 2022

Quentin David Jean Pierre Danloux (born 16 November 2001) is a French footballer who plays as a midfielder for Colombian club Patriotas Boyacá.

== Career ==
Born in Bordeaux, Danloux moved to Spain at the age of three and played the most of his youth career for Elche CF. In 2019, after a year at Kelme CF, he signed for Tercera División side Novelda CF.

In 2020, Danloux signed for Patriotas Boyacá in Colombia, becoming the first Frenchman in the league's history.
