= Billy Higgins (English footballer) =

English footballer

Personal information
- Full name: William Charles Higgins
- Date of birth: 26 February 1924
- Place of birth: Birkenhead, England
- Date of death: 1981 (aged 57/58)
- Place of death: Canterbury, England
- Position: Winger

Senior career*
Years	Team	Apps	(Gls)
1945–1946	Tranmere Rovers	0	(0)
1946–1950	Everton	48	(8)
1950	Millonarios		
1950–1953	Bangor City		
- * Club domestic league appearances and goals

William Charles Higgins (26 February 1924 — 1981) was an English footballer who played as a winger.

== Career ==
In 1946, Everton signed Higgins from Tranmere Rovers, with whom he played for on amateur terms. Higgins made his debut for Everton on 21 September 1946 in a 0–0 Merseyside derby draw against Liverpool. Over the course of four seasons, Higgins made 48 league appearances, scoring eight times.

In May 1950, Higgins signed for Colombian club Millonarios, during the El Dorado era of Colombian football, in which a breakaway league was formed. Despite receiving a £1,000 signing-on fee and a monthly wage of £120, Higgins' time in Colombia was short lived. The Liverpool Echo reported Higgins was unhappy in Colombia and in financial despair, with his signing-on fee "not in order". Higgins returned to England five months later, with £19 to his name. As a result of leaving Everton to join Colombia's Campeonato Profesional, Higgins was suspended by The Football Association, before having his suspension later lifted. Despite talks with Luton Town and Sheffield Wednesday, Higgins eventually ended up signing for Welsh club Bangor City, who played in the English non-league system.

Higgins made his debut for Bangor on 2 December 1950, scoring in a 2–1 win against Runcorn. In October 1952, Higgins had a transfer request accepted by the club. Despite this, he remained with Bangor until the end of the 1952–53 season. Following his retirement from professional football, Billy Higgins took on the licence of the Imperial Hotel, Canterbury, which he ran until the late 1960s.
