= László Szőke =

Hungarian footballer

Personal information
- Date of birth: 17 October 1930
- Place of birth: Budapest, Hungary
- Date of death: 19 March 2014 (aged 83)
- Place of death: Udine, Italy
- Position: Midfielder

Senior career*
Years	Team	Apps	(Gls)
1949–1950	Fanfulla	22	(5)
1951	Junior Barranquilla	33	(10)
1951–1952	RC Paris	5	(1)
1952–1955	Udinese	66	(9)
1955–1960	Triestina	136	(10)
1960–1961	Brescia	27	(0)
1961–1962	Triestina	27	(2)
- * Club domestic league appearances and goals

László Szőke (17 October 1930 – 19 March 2014) was a Hungarian footballer.

== Career ==
Szőke was born in Budapest. In 1949 he moved to Italy under contract to Fanfulla before becoming a well-known name in Italian football by being transferred to first division Udinese who went on to place themselves in second position, behind the great AC Milan, in the Serie A division during the 1955–56 season.

Szőke had a spell in Colombia with Atlético Junior during the 1951 season.

Subsequently, he transferred to Triestina and with them he won the Italian serie B championship in 1957/58.

At the end of the 1960 season he was ceded to Brescia, coached at the time by another Hungarian born personage in György Sárosi, only to return to Trieste at the end of that season. With the Triestina team, now in Serie B, he became one of the squad's focal points, winning the 1961/62 premiership, returning immediately to Serie B where he ended his playing days in 1963 after suffering a serious leg injury.

He remained in the Udine area, and died in hospital in that city on 19 March 2014, at the age of 83.
