= Alberto Ferrero (footballer) =

Uruguayan footballer (born 1944)

Personal information
- Full name: Alberto Ferrero Gordiola
- Date of birth: 15 November 1944 (age 81)
- Place of birth: Uruguay
- Position: Forward

Senior career*
Years	Team	Apps	(Gls)
1960–1963	Racing de Montevideo		
1964	Peñarol		
1966	Peñarol		
1968–1971	Santiago Wanderers	109	(41)
1973	Deportes Antofagasta	24	(8)
1974	Unión La Calera	26	(4)
- * Club domestic league appearances and goals

Alberto Ferrero Gordiola (born 15 November 1944) is a former Uruguayan naturalized Chilean professional football player. He was the topscorer of the 1969 Copa Libertadores with eight goals.

== Club career ==
After having played for Peñarol in his home country, he moved to Chile, where he stayed during the best period of his career. He joined the Santiago Wanderers and scored six goals in 13 games during the 1968 season. His best season at the local level was the 1969 National championship, during which he scored 18 goals in 35 games, being the second top goalscorer of the tournament behind Eladio Zárate (22 goals). He also scored eight goals during the 1969 Copa Libertadores, becoming the top goalgetter for that competition. His team managed to reach the quarterfinals, but failed to qualify for the semifinals. Ferrero left the Wanderers in 1971; he continued to play in Chile, appearing for Unión La Calera and Antofagasta.
