= Unión Magdalena =

Colombian football club

- Full name: Unión Magdalena
- Nicknames: El Ciclón Bananero (The Banana Cyclone); Los Samarios (The Samarios)
- Founded: 10 March 1951; 75 years ago (as Deportivo Samarios); 19 April 1953; 73 years ago (officially)
- Ground: Sierra Nevada
- Capacity: 16,000
- Owner: Eduardo Dávila Armenta
- President: Alberto Garzón
- Head coach: Carlos Silva
- League: Categoría Primera B
- 2025: Primera A, 19th of 20 (relegated by average)
- Website: unionmagdalena.co
Home colours	Away colours	Third colours

Unión Magdalena (Spanish pronunciation: [uˈnjom maɣðaˈlena]) commonly known as El Unión, and nicknamed as El Ciclón Bananero (The Banana Cyclone) and also Los Samarios (The Samarios), is a Colombian football club from the city of Santa Marta, capital of the department of Magdalena, founded on 19 April 1953. They compete in the Categoría Primera A, the first division of the Colombian football league system.

The club's home ground is the Estadio Sierra Nevada, since 2018.

Founded on 10 March 1951 as Deportivo Samarios, the club was re-founded as Unión Magdalena on 19 April 1953. The original playing squad was largely composed of Hungarians who were touring Colombia when their club, the Hungaria FbC Roma, was disbanded.

== History ==
Unión Magdalena was founded as Deportivo Samarios on 10 March 1951. The team was founded with the help of José Eduardo Gnecco Correa and Eduardo Dávila Riascos. It was formed by the Hungaria FbC Roma squad when it was disbanded after a tour in South America. The first team consisted of 10 Colombians, 8 Hungarians, 2 Yugoslavs, 1 Austrian, 1 Argentine, 1 Italian and 1 Romanian. Deportivo Samarios debuted in the league that same year and placed 14th. That season, the team achieved the record of the biggest win in the Colombian league against Universidad, scoring 12–1.

The club was re-founded as Unión Magdalena on 19 April 1953. Unión has only won one championship, in 1968 playing against Deportivo Cali in the final, thus becoming the first football club of the Caribbean region of Colombia to win a football championship in history. Carlos Valderrama, born in Santa Marta and one of the most famous Colombian footballer, started his career in this club.

Relegated in 2005 after losing 3–0 to Deportivo Pereira, Unión earned automatic promotion to the 2019 Categoría Primera A season, after playing 13 years in the second division football league. Despite qualifying for the semifinals of the 2019 Apertura, Unión's performance in the Finalización tournament was poor and the club ended up being relegated on 29 October after losing 3–1 to Once Caldas.

Red and blue stripes compose the traditional shirt of the team, and its design is inspired by the Argentine club San Lorenzo de Almagro.

=== 2021 controversy and promotion ===
On 4 December 2021, the last matchday of the semi-final Group B of the second tournament of the 2021 Primera B season, Unión Magdalena sealed their promotion to Categoría Primera A after coming back from a 1–0 deficit against Llaneros in Villavicencio with a couple of goals in quick succession in stoppage time to win the game by a 2–1 score and get promoted at the expense of Fortaleza, who were clinching promotion with the score in Villavicencio despite losing their final match to Bogotá at the same time. However, video footage of Unión Magdalena's winning goal appeared to show the Llaneros players backing off and failing to make an effort to prevent their rivals from scoring. The events sparked outrage both within the country and abroad, with Colombian internationals Juan Cuadrado and Mateus Uribe expressing their displeasure, calling them "a lack of respect" and "an embarrassment for Colombian football", whilst President of Colombia Iván Duque Márquez stated it was a "national disgrace".

In response to the growing backlash, as well as calls from Fortaleza to get the match annulled and Unión Magdalena's promotion reversed, Dimayor chairman Fernando Jaramillo ordered the opening of an inquiry on the match events while also requesting the Office of the Attorney General of Colombia to investigate whether any criminal offenses had been committed, but on 7 December 2021, Jaramillo stated that the tournament would not be paused and Unión Magdalena's promotion would not be overturned while due process was completed. However, amid the ongoing inquiries, the Torneo II's final match between Cortuluá and Unión Magdalena, which was originally scheduled to be played on 11 December 2021 in Tuluá was postponed until further notice.

On 30 December 2021, Dimayor's disciplinary commission closed the investigation on Unión Magdalena as it found no evidence implying that members of the aforementioned club had been responsible for the events that occurred in the match against Llaneros, thus confirming their promotion to Primera A for the 2022 season.

== Stadiums ==
The Eduardo Santos Stadium, inaugurated in 1951, was the highest sports venue for Magdalenes, located in the Olympic Village of Santa Marta. It served for the Unión Magdalena local games but since its inauguration, it has not only been the headquarters of the Unión Magdalena soccer club, it also witnessed the birth of prominent Colombian soccer figures such as the former Colombian team captain, Carlos "El Pibe" Valderrama. It currently has a capacity of 23,000 spectators.

On 3 March 2013, Unión Magdalena played its last game at the stadium against Llaneros F.C., in compliance with the final closure order of the Eduardo Santos Stadium.

The team had a tour of venues around Riohacha (La Guajira) at the Federico Serrano Soto Stadium and then in the Magdalena municipality of Ciénaga, at the "Luis Tete Samper" Municipal Stadium, with a capacity of 5,000 spectators.

After the inauguration of the Sierra Nevada Stadium for the 2017 Bolivarian Games, the Union Magdalena agreed with the mayor of Santa Marta official to return to the city from the 2018 season.

Period	Stadium
1951 - 1991	Estadio Eduardo Santos
1991	Estadio Jaime Morón León
1992 - 2013	Estadio Eduardo Santos
2013	Estadio Federico Serrano Soto
2014	Estadio Cortes Campomanes (Julia Turbay Samur)
2014 - 2015	Estadio Municipal "Luis Tete Samper"
2016	Estadio Federico Serrano Soto
2017	Estadio Diego de Carvajal
2018–present	Estadio Sierra Nevada

== Players ==
=== Current squad ===
As of 25 September 2026

Note: Flags indicate national team as defined under FIFA eligibility rules; some limited exceptions apply. Players may hold more than one non-FIFA nationality.

No.	Pos.	Nation	Player
1	GK	COL	Víctor Cabezas
2	DF	COL	Manuel Ballesteros
3	DF	COL	Daniel Mera
4	DF	PAR	Rodrigo Delvalle (on loan from Arsenal de Sarandí)
5	DF	COL	Jesús Peñaloza
6	DF	COL	Dilan Ortiz
7	FW	COL	Ruyery Blanco
8	MF	COL	Vicente Prado
9	FW	COL	Cristian Iguarán
10	MF	COL	José Mercado
12	GK	COL	David Mojica
13	MF	COL	Marcel Vergara
14	FW	ARG	Juan Bautista Farías
15	MF	COL	Luis Narváez
16	MF	COL	Oscar Surmay
17	FW	COL	Gabriel Arrieta

No.	Pos.	Nation	Player
18	DF	VEN	Freddy Molina
19	MF	COL	Fabián Mosquera
20	MF	COL	Juan José Vásquez
21	FW	COL	Juan Romero
22	MF	COL	Juan Diego Giraldo
23	MF	COL	Jimmy Congo
24	FW	COL	Miguel Cervantes
25	DF	COL	Winston Sagrera
26	FW	COL	Santiago Franco
27	DF	COL	Jhon Lerma
28	MF	COL	Kevin Salazar
29	MF	COL	Jairo Pimienta
30	FW	COL	Giancarlo García
34	GK	ARG	Manuel Tasso (on loan from Independiente)
40	FW	ARG	Valentín Escalante (on loan from San Lorenzo)

=== First Team (Deportivo Samarios – 1951) ===
Note: Flags indicate national team as defined under FIFA eligibility rules; some limited exceptions apply. Players may hold more than one non-FIFA nationality.

No.	Pos.	Nation	Player
—	GK	HUN	Ernest Sabeditch
—	GK	COL	Rubén Rocha
—	GK	COL	Jaime de la Spriella
—	GK	YUG	Zvonko Monsider
—	DF	COL	Víctor Lanao
—	DF	ROU	Alexandru Negrescu
—	DF	HUN	Sándor Török
—	MF	HUN	Gerro Hinduliak
—	MF	HUN	József Samu
—	MF	COL	Enrique Ortiz
—	MF	COL	Nelson Pérez
—	MF	COL	Rómulo Barrios

No.	Pos.	Nation	Player
—	MF	COL	Felipe Fernández
—	MF	ARG	Rafael Botto
—	FW	HUN	György Marik
—	FW	HUN	Joseph Kajml
—	FW	HUN	Gyula Zsengellér (also Manager)
—	FW	COL	Orlando Granados
—	FW	HUN	László Füzesi
—	FW	YUG	Milos Dragolovich
—	FW	AUT	Rudolf Strittich
—	FW	COL	Antonio Carrasquilla
—	FW	ITA	Alessandro Adam
—	FW	COL	Apolinar Pérez

=== Notable players ===
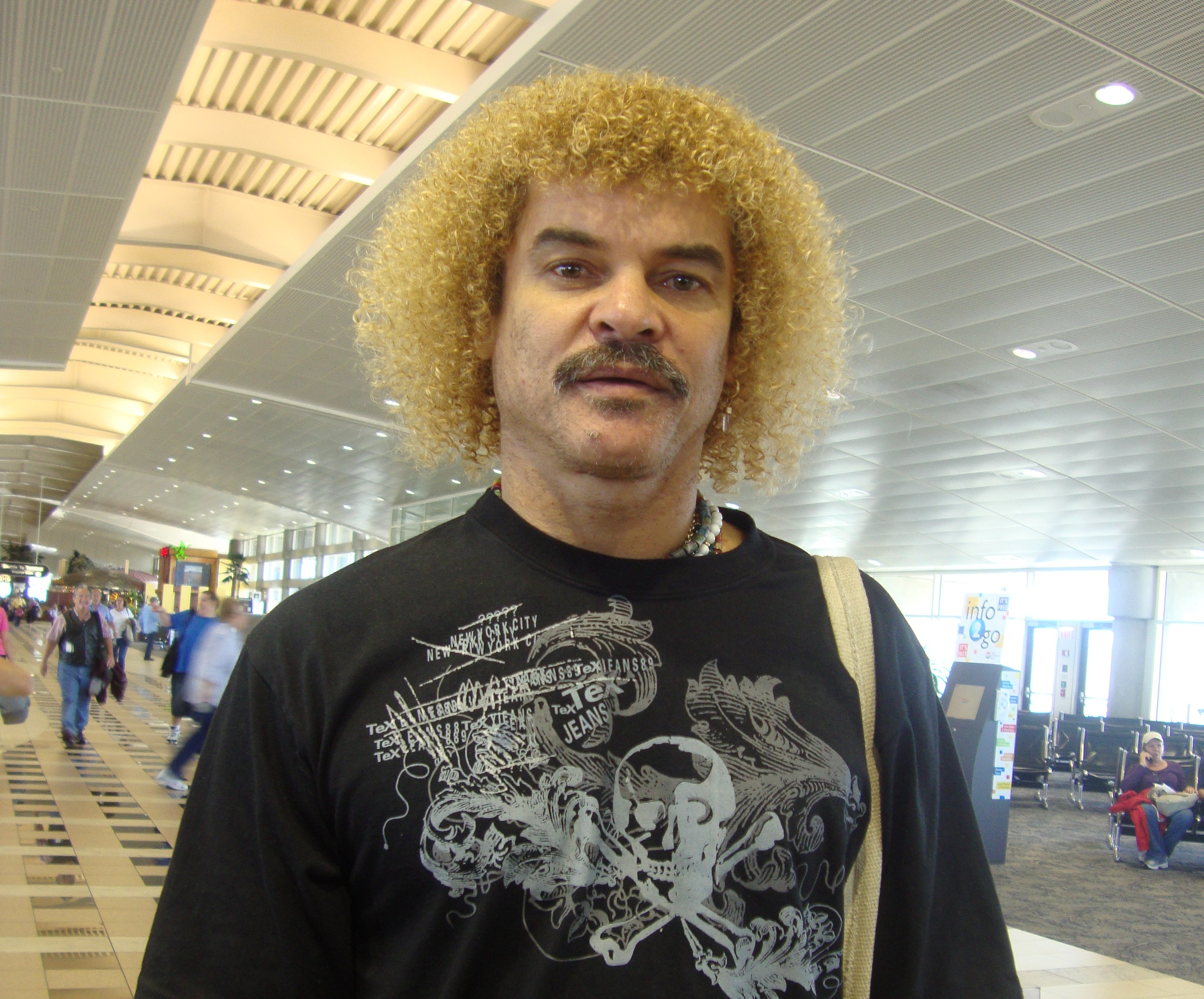
Carlos "El Pibe" Valderrama

- (Hungary) Gyula Zsengellér (1951–53)
- (Czechoslovakia) Jiří Hanke (1951)
- (Hungary) György Marik (1951–1952)
- (Hungary) Gabriel Rakosky (1952)
- (Hungary) Kalman Lami (1952)
- (Hungary) Ladislao Magyar (1952)
- (Hungary) Nicolás Hrotko (1952)
- (Italy) Bruno Gerzelli (1952)
- (Italy) Corrado Contin (1952)
- (Peru) Manuel Rossi (1965)
- (Paraguay) Arístides Del Puerto (1973)
- (Argentina) Luis Giribet (1976)
- (Chile) Víctor Solar (1977)
- (Colombia) Carlos Valderrama (1981–84)
- (Colombia) Alfredo Arango (1965–1972),(1973–1974),(1978–1980)
- (Colombia) Carlos Arango (1950),(1960–1961)
- (Colombia) Aurelio Palacios
- (Colombia) Nixon Perea (1993)
- (Colombia) Erwin Carrillo (2004–2005),(2007–2009),(2012–2014),(2018)
- (Colombia) Ruyery Blanco (2016–2021)
- (Argentina) Fernando Batiste (2018–2019)
- (Colombia) Abel Aguilar (2018–2020)
- (Colombia) David Ferreira (2018–2019)
- (Colombia) Ricardo Márquez (2018–2020), (2022–2024)
- (Colombia) (Equatorial Guinea) Carlos Bejarano (2022-2023)
- (Colombia) Alexander Mejía (2023)

== Honours ==
=== Domestic ===
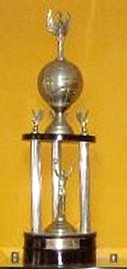
Campeonato Profesional trophy replica from 1968

- Categoría Primera A
  - Winners (1): 1968
- Categoría Primera B
  - Winners (2): 2021–II, 2024
  - Runners-up (2): 2000, 2018
- Copa Colombia
  - Runners-up (1): 1989

== Performance in CONMEBOL competitions ==
Season	Competition	Round	Opponent	Home	Away	Pen.
1969	Copa Libertadores	GS	(Colombia) Deportivo Cali	2–2	1–3	—
1969	Copa Libertadores	GS	(Venezuela) Deportivo Italia	3–0	0–2	—
1969	Copa Libertadores	GS	(Venezuela) Deportivo Canarias	0–1	1–0	—

== Personnel ==
=== Current technical staff ===
Position	Staff
Head coach	(Colombia) Jorge Luis Pinto
Assistant manager	(Colombia) Melquisedec Navarro Vidal
Physical Trainer	(Colombia) Gilberto Arenas Monsalve
Doctor	(Colombia) Edgar Sanchez Comas (Colombia) Orlando Moreno Barriga
Kinesiologist	(Colombia) Fabian Andres Bedoya (Colombia) Dairo Granados Labarces
Field Delegated	(Colombia) Orlando Zuniga Sanchez (Colombia) Christian Orozco Oliveros
Property master	(Colombia) Manuel Alvarez Ariza

Last updated: 27 August 2024
Source: Dimayor

=== Notable managers ===
The following managers won at least one trophy when in charge of Union Magdalena:

Name	Period	Trophies
(Colombia) Antonio Julio de la Hoz	1968	1968 Campeonato Profesional
(Colombia) Carlos Silva	2019–2022	2021–II Categoría Primera B
(Colombia) Jorge Luis Pinto	2024–2025	2024 Categoría Primera B
