= Bruno Gerzeli =

Italian footballer (1925-1982)

Personal information
- Full name: Bruno Livio Gerzeli
- Date of birth: 3 October 1925
- Place of birth: Monfalcone, Italy
- Date of death: 8 November 1982 (aged 57)
- Place of death: Salt Lake City, Utah, United States
- Position: Striker

Senior career*
Years	Team	Apps	(Gls)
1942–1943	C.R.D.A Monfalcone		
1945–1946	Monfalconese C.N.T.		
1946–1947	Venezia	1	(0)
1947–1948	Marzotto Valdagno		
1948–1949	Salernitana	9	(2)
1949–1950	Stabia		
1950–1951	Biellese	31	(3)
1951–1952	Anconitana	31	(4)
1952	Deportivo Samarios	20	(5)
1954–1955	Aosta	18	(0)
1954–1955	Toronto Hungarians		
1956–1958	Toronto Sparta		
1963	K.F.C. Estonia		

Managerial career
- 1963: K.F.C. Estonia
- * Club domestic league appearances and goals

Bruno Gerzeli (3 October 1925 – 8 November 1982) was an Italian professional footballer who played as a forward.

== Career ==
Born in Monfalcone, Gerzeli, a winger, inside forward and centre-forward, started his career in the Serie C side C.R.D.A. Monfalcone, which was the team of his hometown Monfalcone. After World War II, Gerzeli played the 1945-46 Serie C season for Monfalconese (which was the new name of C.R.D.A. Monfalcone); he was then signed by Venezia, a team which was competing in the Serie A. Gerzeli only played one match during the 1946–47 Serie A season, on 6 July 1947, against Triestina. After this one-match experience, he left Venezia and moved to Marzotto Valdagno, coming back to Serie C. He played the Serie B championship in 1948–1949 with Salernitana. In 1952, he decided to leave Italy for Colombia, a nation in which professional football was well-paid because of the so-called El Dorado period. He played for Deportivo Samarios in Colombia along with two other Italian footballers, Corrado Contin and Alessandro Adam. He collected 20 appearances with Samarios, scoring five goals (the first of which was scored against Atlético Nacional on 1 June 1952). In the summer of 1954 he played in the National Soccer League (NSL) with Toronto Hungarians. In 1956, he continued playing in the NSL with Toronto Sparta, and was suspended by the league until 1960 after an incident with a referee in late 1958. In 1963, he served as a player-coach for K.F.C. Estonia in the National Soccer League.

== Personal life ==
After he retired from playing, Gerzeli emigrated to Canada in 1954. He married and moved to the United States where he coached the Brigham Young University soccer program. He was originally baptized as a Roman Catholic, but later converted to Mormonism. In early 1980, Gerzeli volunteered to coach the Olympus High School soccer team. The following year this team won the 4A State soccer tournament as significant underdogs to neighboring Skyline High School.

Gerzeli died in Salt Lake City on November 8, 1982, due to hepatitis of the liver.
