= Mihail Uram =

Hungarian footballer

Personal information
- Date of birth: 20 June 1924
- Place of birth: Budapest, Hungary
- Position: Midfielder

Senior career*
Years	Team	Apps	(Gls)
1945–1946	Dynamo Mukachevo	?	
1947	Bolshevik Mukachevo	?	
1948	Sokol NV Bratislava	8	(0)
1948–1949	Lucchese	7	(0)
1949–1950	Spezia	28	(0)
1950	FBK Hungaria		
1951	Atlético Junior	10	(0)
1952–1953	New York Hungaria		
- * Club domestic league appearances and goals

Mihail Uram (Hungarian: Uram Mihály, Ukrainian: Урам Міхай; born 20 June 1924) is a Hungarian former football player.

== Career ==
Born in Budapest, Uram began playing youth football in Mukachevo. Next, he played senior football for local sides Dynamo Mukachevo and Bolshevik Mukachevo. He signed with ŠK Bratislava in Czechoslovakia before moving to Italy.

Uram signed with Serie A side Lucchese before the 1948–49 season, but only made seven league appearances for the club. He would join Serie B side Spezia for the next two seasons, leaving for FBK Hungaria in the 1950–51 season winter break.

Uram finished his playing career in the Americas, first joining Colombian side Atlético Junior and then New York Hungaria in the United States.
