= Corrado Contin =

Italian footballer (1922-2001)

Personal information
- Date of birth: 7 January 1922
- Place of birth: Aquileia, Italy
- Date of death: 16 November 2001 (aged 79)
- Position: Defender

Senior career*
| Years | Team | Apps | (Gls) |
| 1940–1942 | Pieris | | |
| 1943–1944 | Cormonese | 13 | (0) |
| 1945–1950 | Roma | 86 | (0) |
| 1952 | Deportivo Samarios | 23 | (0) |
| 1953–1956 | Cuneo | | |
- * Club domestic league appearances and goals

Corrado "Dino" Contin (7 January 1922 – 16 November 2001) was an Italian professional footballer who played as a defender.

== Career ==
After initial brief spells with Italian clubs Pieris and Cormonese in the early 1940s, Contin joined Serie A side A.S. Roma in 1945; he played there for four seasons (65 games, no goals). He later also played for Deportivo Samarios in Colombia in 1952, along with two other Italian footballers, Bruno Gerzelli and Alessandro Adam. He ended his career in his home country in 1956, after three years with Cuneo.

== Personal life ==
Contin was married to Aileen Courteen, who he met in Caracas, Venezuela. They resided there for more than 30 years and had one daughter. After retiring in 1990, Contin divided his time between Cervignano, Italy and Wickenburg, Arizona. He died in November 2001 at the age of 79.
