= 1968 Bolivian Primera División =

Bolivian Primera División
- Season: 1968
- Champions: Bolívar

The 1968 Bolivian Primera División, the first division of Bolivian football (soccer), was played by 6 teams. The champion was Bolívar.

== La Paz Group ==
Pos	Team	Pld	W	D	L	GF	GA	GD	Pts
1	Always Ready	21	12	3	6	40	27	+13	27
2	Bolívar	21	10	6	5	32	20	+12	26
3	Mariscal Santa Cruz	21	9	6	6	51	41	+10	24
4	Universitario de La Paz	21	9	5	7	42	39	+3	23
5	Deportivo Municipal	21	10	2	9	39	45	−6	22
6	The Strongest	21	8	2	11	33	36	−3	18
7	31 de Octubre	21	5	7	9	23	31	−8	17
8	Chaco Petrolero	21	3	5	13	38	59	−21	11

== Final Group ==
Pos	Team	Pld	W	D	L	GF	GA	GD	Pts
1	Bolívar	10	8	0	2	20	4	+16	16
2	Guabirá	10	5	2	3	14	9	+5	12
3	Litoral	10	5	2	3	14	15	−1	12
4	Blooming	10	3	2	5	12	17	−5	8
5	Always Ready	10	3	0	7	18	22	−4	6
6	Bata	10	2	2	6	11	22	−11	6
