= Rudi Strittich =

Austrian footballer

Personal information
- Full name: Rudolf Strittich
- Date of birth: 3 March 1922
- Date of death: 11 July 2010 (aged 88)
- Position: Midfielder

Senior career*
| Years | Team | Apps | (Gls) |
| 1936–1946 | Vorwärts Steyr | | |
| 1946–1950 | First Vienna | | |
| 1950–1951 | USC Triestina | | |
| 1951 | Samarios | 25 | (5) |
| 1952–1953 | First Vienna | | |
| 1953–1955 | Besançon RC | | |

International career^{‡}
| 1946–1949 | Austria | 4 | (0) |

Managerial career
- 1955–1956: Sturm Graz
- 1957–1958: Basel
- 1959–1960: Apollon Kalamarias
- 1961–1962: Esbjerg fB
- 1962–1963: Vorwärts Steyr
- 1964: Viborg FF
- 1965–1967: Esbjerg fB
- 1968–1969: Aalborg BK
- 1970–1975: Denmark
- 1976: Real Murcia
- 1976–1979: Esbjerg fB
- 1980: Austria Salzburg
- * Club domestic league appearances and goals as of 26 August 2008 ‡ National team caps and goals as of 26 August 2008

Rudi Strittich (3 March 1922 – 11 July 2010) was an Austrian football coach and former player.

== Club career ==
Strittich debuted for Vorwärts Steyr, and later played for First Vienna FC. While with First Vienna, he went on a tour of the Middle East and upon returning was arrested along with two other players for smuggling narcotics into Austria. Strittich was imprisoned for three months and banned from football for one year by the Austrian Football Association.

Unable to play football in Austria, Strittich was recruited by Béla Guttmann to play for Italian club USC Triestina. The Austrian FA would not clear him to play, so he joined Colombian side Samarios, where he could play because the Colombian Football Federation was not at the time affiliated to FIFA.

Upon returning to Austria, Strittich learned that his ban was still in effect, as the Austrian FA ruled that he did serve the ban while playing in Colombia. He moved to Switzerland and trained with the youth side of Young Fellows Zürich. Next, he briefly returned to Vienna, and was sold to French side Besançon RC after just six months. He suffered a back injury in France, and would retire from playing soon after.

== International career ==
He made his debut for Austria in December 1946 against Hungary and earned 4 caps, scoring one goal.

== Coaching career ==
After retiring as a football player Strittich worked as a coach for Sturm Graz in his home country. However, his greatest success as a coach came in Denmark, where he made Esbjerg fB champions in 1961, 1962, 1965, and 1979. He was also coach of the Denmark national football team from 1970 to 1975.

== Honours ==
=== As a player ===
- Austrian Football Bundesliga (1): 1943

=== As a manager ===
- Danish Football League (4): 1961, 1962, 1965, 1979
