= 1997 NIRSA National Soccer Championship =

- League: NIRSA
- Sport: Soccer
- Site: Georgia Southern; Statesboro, Georgia
- Duration: November 20–22, 1997
- Teams: 16 (men's championship); 16 (women's championship); 16 (men's open); 4 (women's open)
- Results: Official Results

Men's Championship Division
- Score: 1–0 (a.e.t.)
- Champion: BYU (2nd title, 2nd title game)
- Runners-up: Texas (2nd title game)
- Season MVP: Steven Crook (BYU)

Women's Championship Division
- Score: 1–0
- Champion: Colorado State (1st title, 1st title game)
- Runners-up: Penn State (1st title game)
- Season MVP: Erin Ortega (Colorado State)

Men's Open Division
- Score: 4–1
- Champion: Texas Tech (1st title, 2nd title game)
- Runners-up: Texas "B" (2nd title game)
- Season MVP: Jeff Dupre (Texas Tech)

Women's Open Division
- Score: 3–2
- Champion: Virginia Tech (1st title, 1st title game)
- Runners-up: Colorado State "Green" (1st title game)
- Top seed: Amy Mayer (Virginia Tech)

NIRSA national soccer championships seasons
- ← 1996 1998 →

The 1997 NIRSA national soccer championship was the 4th NIRSA National Soccer Championships, the annual national championships for United States-based, collegiate club soccer teams organized by NIRSA. It took place at Georgia Southern University in Statesboro, Georgia from Thursday, November 20 to Saturday, November 22, 1997.

== Overview ==
=== Men's championship ===
In the finals, reigning champions, BYU, would face 1995 champions, Texas, in a rematch of the previous year's group stage opener. Prior to this, in the group stage, Texas would win all three games by a score of 2–0, first beating Wyoming and Ohio State, respectively, on Thursday then JMU on Friday. Meanwhile, BYU would also win all three games beating Texas A&M 3–0, Penn State 2–0, and finally, Clemson tournament winners, Georgia, 1–0.

In the quarterfinals, in what was described as wet and rainy conditions, BYU would beat Salt Lake Community College 2–1 while Texas would defeat in-state rival, Texas A&M, for the fourth time that season following a goal from David Sorenson with 10 minutes remaining in the match. In the semifinals, Texas would face North Carolina and would score the first three goals of the match but would concede their first goal in 12 matches off of a corner that made the game 3–1 at the time. Texas would then score two more goals in route to a 5–1 win and their second finals appearance. Meanwhile, BYU would face JMU and would open the scoring early in the second half but would concede late which sent the game to overtime. After a scoreless overtime, the game would go into penalties where BYU's goalkeeper Bryce Jolley saved two attempts and scored the winning goal to send BYU to their second straight final.

In the finals, the game would remain deadlocked at 0–0 after regulation meaning a 10-minute golden goal overtime would be required. With 30 seconds remaining, BYU's freshman forward, Ryan Hawkins, would score a scissor kick to secure BYU's second consecutive title, the first men's championship team to win two titles and the first team in any division to win back-to-back titles. BYU's senior midfielder, Steven Crook, would be named tournament MVP.

=== Women's championship ===
In the finals, Colorado State would face Penn State. Prior to this, Colorado State tied their opener 0–0 to Ohio State, then beat Clemson 4–0, and finally beat Maryland 7–0. Meanwhile, Penn State won their opener against Kansas 3–0 on goals from Courtney Davis, Angela Nolfi, and Christa Rimonneau, outshooting Kansas 20–1. They would then face Salt Lake CC who would score early but a goal from Jessica Ashbaugh would tie the game at 1–1, a score the game ended on. Finally, Penn State would defeat Dayton 4–0 on goals from Courtney Davis, Angela Nolfi, and two from Katie Stober.

In the quarterfinals, Penn State would face Ohio State where they'd score the first two goals from Georgia Hartnett and Katie Stober. Ohio State would then score but another goal from Stober would secure a 3–1 win. Meanwhile, Colorado State would face reigning runners-up, Purdue, and would end regulation with a 1–1 draw. Colorado State would score in overtime to win 2–1 and advance to the semifinals. In the semifinals, Colorado State would defeat North Carolina 3–0 to advance to their first finals while Penn State would face undefeated JMU. Penn State's Courtney Davis would open the scoring and Angela Nolfi would double the advantage. JMU would score late in the first half but that wouldn't be enough as Penn State won 2–1. In the finals, in front of what was reported as 400 spectators, the first half would be scoreless. In the second half, Colorado State would score the lone goal of the match and claim their first national title. Colorado State's freshman, Erin Ortega, would be named tournament MVP.

=== Men's open ===
In the finals, Texas Tech would face Texas' "B" team. Prior to this, in the group stage, Texas Tech would defeat Illinois Central College 8–1, then Morehouse 4–0, and finally JMU's "B" team 2–0 to top their group. Meanwhile, Texas would beat South Dakota School of the Mines 8–0, then beat the hosts, Georgia Southern's, "B" team 5–0, and finally beat Colorado State 1–0 to also top their group. In the knockout round, Texas Tech would defeat Colorado State 4–1 in the quarterfinals, then beat regional tournament runners-up, San Antonio College, 5–0 in the semifinals to advance to their second open finals in three years. Meanwhile, Texas "B" defeated Miami (FL) 5–1 in the quarterfinals then would face Clemson in the semifinals. The game would remain 0–0 after regulation and overtime, but Texas "B" would win in penalties to set up a rematch of the finals from two years ago where Texas "B" would claim the inaugural open title. In the finals, Texas Tech would defeat Texas "B" 4–1 to claim their first open title. Texas Tech's Jeff Dupre would be named tournament champions.

=== Women's open ===
The division was composed of 4 teams, three of which were region II teams. The teams were Virginia Tech, Florida, Tennessee, and Colorado State's "Green" team (also known as their "B" team as their "A", or "Gold", team competed in the championship division). In the group stage opening round, Florida would defeat Colorado State "Green" 1–0 while Virginia Tech beat Tennessee 4–1. In the second round of the group stage, Colorado State "Green" beat Tennessee 2–0 while Virginia Tech beat Florida 2–1. The group stage would end with two ties with Colorado State "Green" tying Virginia Tech 0–0 and Florida tying Tennessee 1–1 meaning Virginia Tech would top the group, Florida would be placed second on the head-to-head tiebreaker over third placed Colorado State "Green" who were tied with Florida on points, and finally Tennessee would be 4th. In the semifinals, Virginia Tech defeated Tennessee 3–0 while Colorado State "Green" would defeat Florida 1–0, advancing to the finals like their "Gold" team in the championship division. In the finals, Virginia Tech would win 3–2 and claim their first open title. Virginia Tech's Amy Mayer would be named division MVP and notably, Virginia Tech's roster also included former Virginia Tech varsity player, Shannon Mullen, who participated in the first two years of the program's varsity history and would be named to the all-tournament team.

== Format ==
The competition consisted of 52 teams partitioned into 32 men's teams and 20 women's teams. Each of these partitions were further divided into a 16-team, invite-only championship division and an open division for the remaining teams. The championship divisions and men's open division were divided into four groups of four teams each while the women's open tournament divided teams into a single group of four.

All 4 divisions began with a round-robin tournament where teams played each of the other teams in their group once. Following this, in the championship divisions and men's open, the two best teams in each group advanced to a single-elimination, knockout round while all four teams in the women's open division advanced to their single-elimination, knockout round. The knockout stage was an 8-team tournament for each division except the women's open which was 4 teams. While not specifically stated, it appears, based on results, that the three points for a win system was used with head-to-head being the first tiebreaker and goal difference being the second.

== Qualification and selections ==
NIRSA extended invitations to the 16 men's and 16 women's teams to participate in the championship division beginning on October 20, 1997 with those invitations being extend to who NIRSA believed were the best in the nation. Reigning champions BYU in the men and Miami (OH) in the women received an automatic bid as well as the winner of the Clemson tournament for the men's and women's division. The teams that participated in the open division were chosen on a first-come first-serve basis with registration beginning on September 15, 1997 with a maximum of 12 teams per division.

=== Men's championship ===
Participating teams
Region	Team	Appearance	Last Bid
I	Maryland	2nd	1996
I	Penn State	1st	Never
II	JMU	2nd	1996
II	North Carolina	2nd	1996
II	Georgia (Note: Qualified as Clemson tournament champion)	1st	Never
III	Purdue	4th	1996
III	Miami (OH)	2nd	1996
III	Ohio State	2nd	1995
IV	Texas	4th	1996
IV	Kansas State	2nd	1995
IV	Texas A&M	2nd	1994
V	Colorado	2nd	1995
V	Wyoming	1st	Never
VI	Oregon	3rd	1996
VI	Salt Lake CC	3rd	1996
VI	BYU (Note: Qualified as reigning champions)	2nd	1996

=== Women's championship ===
Participating teams
Region	Team	Appearance	Last Bid
I	Penn State	3rd	1996
I	Maryland	1st	Never
II	Clemson	2nd	1996
II	JMU	2nd	1996
II	North Carolina	1st	Never
II	West Virginia	1st	Never
III	Purdue	4th	1996
III	Miami (OH)	4th	1996
III	Ohio State	3rd	1996
III	Dayton	1st	Never
IV	Kansas	2nd	1996
IV	Texas	3rd	1995
IV	Texas A&M	1st	Never
V	Colorado	3rd	1996
V	Colorado State	1st	Never
VI	Salt Lake CC	2nd	1996

=== Men's open ===
Region	Num	Team
I	0	–
II	8	Clemson, Daytona Beach CC, Georgia Southern "A", Georgia Southern "B", JMU "B", Miami (FL), Morehouse College, Oxford College
III	2	Grand Valley State, Illinois Central College
IV	4	Houston, San Antonio College, Texas Tech, Texas "B"
V	2	Colorado State, South Dakota Mines
VI	0	–

=== Women's open ===
Region	Num	Team
I	0	–
II	3	Florida, Tennessee, Virginia Tech
III	0	–
IV	0	–
V	1	Colorado State "Green"
VI	0	–

== Group stage ==
=== Men's championship ===
Group A
Pos	Team	Pld	W	D	L	GF	GA	GD	Pts	Qualification
1	Kansas State	3	2	1	0	7	4	+3	7	Advanced to knockout stage
2	Oregon	3	2	0	1	10	4	+6	6	Advanced to knockout stage
3	Purdue	3	1	0	2	4	7	−3	3	
4	Maryland	3	0	1	2	3	9	−6	1	

Scores

8:00am EST	Maryland	1–2	Purdue	Field 5
Thu, November 20		Report		Stadium: Georgia Southern University; Statesboro, Georgia

8:00am EST	Kansas State	3–1	Oregon	Field 6
Thu, November 20		Report		Stadium: Georgia Southern University; Statesboro, Georgia

2:00pm EST	Oregon	6–1	Maryland	Field 5
Thu, November 20		Report		Stadium: Georgia Southern University; Statesboro, Georgia

2:00pm EST	Purdue	2–3	Kansas State	Field 6
Thu, November 20		Report		Stadium: Georgia Southern University; Statesboro, Georgia

12:00pm EST	Maryland	1–1	Kansas State	Field 1
Fri, November 21		Report		Stadium: Georgia Southern University; Statesboro, Georgia

12:00pm EST	Oregon	3–0	Purdue	Field 2
Fri, November 21		Report		Stadium: Georgia Southern University; Statesboro, Georgia

Group B
Pos	Team	Pld	W	D	L	GF	GA	GD	Pts	Qualification
1	North Carolina	3	2	0	1	5	3	+2	6	Advanced to knockout stage
2	Salt Lake CC	3	1	2	0	6	5	+1	5	Advanced to knockout stage
3	Colorado	3	1	1	1	4	3	+1	4	
4	Miami (OH)	3	0	1	2	2	6	−4	1	

Scores

10:00am EST	Miami (OH)	0–1	North Carolina	Field 1
Thu, November 20		Report		Stadium: Georgia Southern University; Statesboro, Georgia

10:00am EST	Colorado	1–1	Salt Lake CC	Field 2
Thu, November 20		Report		Stadium: Georgia Southern University; Statesboro, Georgia

4:00pm EST	Salt Lake CC	2–2	Miami (OH)	Field 1
Thu, November 20		Report		Stadium: Georgia Southern University; Statesboro, Georgia

4:00pm EST	North Carolina	2–0	Colorado	Field 2
Thu, November 20		Report		Stadium: Georgia Southern University; Statesboro, Georgia

12:00pm EST	Miami (OH)	0–3	Colorado	Field 3
Fri, November 21		Report		Stadium: Georgia Southern University; Statesboro, Georgia

12:00pm EST	Salt Lake CC	3–2	North Carolina	Field 4
Fri, November 21		Report		Stadium: Georgia Southern University; Statesboro, Georgia

Group C
Pos	Team	Pld	W	D	L	GF	GA	GD	Pts	Qualification
1	BYU	3	3	0	0	6	0	+6	9	Advanced to knockout stage
2	Texas A&M	3	1	1	1	3	4	−1	4	Advanced to knockout stage
3	Georgia	3	0	2	1	1	2	−1	2	
4	Penn State	3	0	1	2	0	4	−4	1	

Scores

10:00am EST	BYU	3–0	Texas A&M	Field 3
Thu, November 20		Report		Stadium: Georgia Southern University; Statesboro, Georgia

10:00am EST	Georgia	0–0	Penn State	Field 4
Thu, November 20		Report		Stadium: Georgia Southern University; Statesboro, Georgia

4:00pm EST	Penn State	0–2	BYU	Field 3
Thu, November 20		Report		Stadium: Georgia Southern University; Statesboro, Georgia

4:00pm EST	Texas A&M	1–1	Georgia	Field 4
Thu, November 20		Report		Stadium: Georgia Southern University; Statesboro, Georgia

12:00pm EST	BYU	1–0	Georgia	Field 5
Fri, November 21		Report		Stadium: Georgia Southern University; Statesboro, Georgia

12:00pm EST	Penn State	0–2	Texas A&M	Field 6
Fri, November 21		Report		Stadium: Georgia Southern University; Statesboro, Georgia

Group D
Pos	Team	Pld	W	D	L	GF	GA	GD	Pts	Qualification
1	Texas	3	3	0	0	6	0	+6	9	Advanced to knockout stage
2	JMU	3	2	0	1	9	3	+6	6	Advanced to knockout stage
3	Ohio State	3	1	0	2	4	5	−1	3	
4	Wyoming	3	0	0	3	1	12	−11	0	

Scores

12:00pm EST	Texas	2–0	Wyoming	Field 5
Thu, November 20		Report		Stadium: Georgia Southern University; Statesboro, Georgia

12:00pm EST	JMU	3–0	Ohio State	Field 6
Thu, November 20		Report		Stadium: Georgia Southern University; Statesboro, Georgia

6:00pm EST	Ohio State	0–2	Texas	Field 5
Thu, November 20		Report		Stadium: Georgia Southern University; Statesboro, Georgia

6:00pm EST	Wyoming	1–6	JMU	Field 6
Thu, November 20		Report		Stadium: Georgia Southern University; Statesboro, Georgia

12:00pm EST	Texas	2–0	JMU	Field 7
Fri, November 21		Report		Stadium: Georgia Southern University; Statesboro, Georgia

12:00pm EST	Ohio State	4–0	Wyoming	Field 8
Fri, November 21		Report		Stadium: Georgia Southern University; Statesboro, Georgia

=== Women's championship ===
Group A
Pos	Team	Pld	W	D	L	GF	GA	GD	Pts	Qualification
1	Colorado State	3	2	1	0	11	0	+11	7	Advanced to knockout stage
2	Ohio State	3	1	2	0	3	0	+3	5	Advanced to knockout stage
3	Clemson	3	1	1	1	2	5	−3	4	
4	Maryland	3	0	0	3	1	12	−11	0	

Scores

8:00am EST	Ohio State	0–0	Colorado State	Field 1
Thu, November 20		Report		Stadium: Georgia Southern University; Statesboro, Georgia

8:00am EST	Clemson	2–1	Maryland	Field 2
Thu, November 20		Report		Stadium: Georgia Southern University; Statesboro, Georgia

2:00pm EST	Maryland	0–3	Ohio State	Field 1
Thu, November 20		Report		Stadium: Georgia Southern University; Statesboro, Georgia

2:00pm EST	Colorado State	4–0	Clemson	Field 2
Thu, November 20		Report		Stadium: Georgia Southern University; Statesboro, Georgia

10:00am EST	Ohio State	0–0	Clemson	Field 1
Fri, November 21		Report		Stadium: Georgia Southern University; Statesboro, Georgia

10:00am EST	Maryland	0–7	Colorado State	Field 2
Fri, November 21		Report		Stadium: Georgia Southern University; Statesboro, Georgia

Group B
Pos	Team	Pld	W	D	L	GF	GA	GD	Pts	Qualification
1	Penn State	3	2	1	0	8	1	+7	7	Advanced to knockout stage
2	Salt Lake CC	3	2	1	0	5	1	+4	7	Advanced to knockout stage
3	Dayton	3	1	0	2	2	6	−4	3	
4	Kansas	3	0	0	3	1	8	−7	0	

Scores

8:00am EST	Dayton	0–1	Salt Lake CC	Field 3
Thu, November 20		Report		Stadium: Georgia Southern University; Statesboro, Georgia

8:00am EST	Penn State	3–0	Kansas	Field 4
Thu, November 20		Report		Stadium: Georgia Southern University; Statesboro, Georgia

2:00pm EST	Kansas	1–2	Dayton	Field 3
Thu, November 20		Report		Stadium: Georgia Southern University; Statesboro, Georgia

2:00pm EST	Salt Lake CC	1–1	Penn State	Field 4
Thu, November 20		Report		Stadium: Georgia Southern University; Statesboro, Georgia

10:00am EST	Dayton	0–4	Penn State	Field 3
Fri, November 21		Report		Stadium: Georgia Southern University; Statesboro, Georgia

10:00am EST	Kansas	0–3	Salt Lake CC	Field 4
Fri, November 21		Report		Stadium: Georgia Southern University; Statesboro, Georgia

Group C
Pos	Team	Pld	W	D	L	GF	GA	GD	Pts	Qualification
1	North Carolina	3	2	1	0	8	4	+4	7	Advanced to knockout stage
2	Colorado	3	1	1	1	2	3	−1	4	Advanced to knockout stage
3	Miami (OH)	3	1	1	1	2	2	0	4	
4	Texas A&M	3	0	1	2	2	5	1	1	

Scores

12:00pm EST	Miami (OH)	0–1	Colorado	Field 1
Thu, November 20		Report		Stadium: Georgia Southern University; Statesboro, Georgia

12:00pm EST	North Carolina	4–2	Texas A&M	Field 2
Thu, November 20		Report		Stadium: Georgia Southern University; Statesboro, Georgia

6:00pm EST	Texas A&M	0–1	Miami (OH)	Field 1
Thu, November 20		Report		Stadium: Georgia Southern University; Statesboro, Georgia

6:00pm EST	Colorado	1–3	North Carolina	Field 2
Thu, November 20		Report		Stadium: Georgia Southern University; Statesboro, Georgia

10:00am EST	Miami (OH)	1–1	North Carolina	Field 5
Fri, November 21		Report		Stadium: Georgia Southern University; Statesboro, Georgia

10:00am EST	Texas A&M	0–0	Colorado	Field 6
Fri, November 21		Report		Stadium: Georgia Southern University; Statesboro, Georgia

Group D
Pos	Team	Pld	W	D	L	GF	GA	GD	Pts	Qualification
1	JMU	3	3	0	0	10	1	+9	9	Advanced to knockout stage
2	Purdue	3	2	0	1	5	4	+1	6	Advanced to knockout stage
3	Texas	3	1	0	2	3	7	−4	3	
4	West Virginia	3	0	0	3	2	8	−6	0	

Scores

12:00pm EST	JMU	4–0	Texas	Field 3
Thu, November 20		Report		Stadium: Georgia Southern University; Statesboro, Georgia

12:00pm EST	West Virginia	1–2	Purdue	Field 4
Thu, November 20		Report		Stadium: Georgia Southern University; Statesboro, Georgia

6:00pm EST	Purdue	1–3	JMU	Field 3
Thu, November 20		Report		Stadium: Georgia Southern University; Statesboro, Georgia

6:00pm EST	Texas	3–1	West Virginia	Field 4
Thu, November 20		Report		Stadium: Georgia Southern University; Statesboro, Georgia

10:00am EST	JMU	3–0	West Virginia	Field 7
Fri, November 21		Report		Stadium: Georgia Southern University; Statesboro, Georgia

10:00am EST	Purdue	2–0	Texas	Field 8
Fri, November 21		Report		Stadium: Georgia Southern University; Statesboro, Georgia

=== Men's open ===
Group E
Pos	Team	Pld	W	D	L	GF	GA	GD	Pts	Qualification
1	Texas Tech	3	3	0	0	14	1	+13	9	Advanced to knockout stage
2	Morehouse College	3	2	0	1	5	4	+1	6	Advanced to knockout stage
3	JMU "B"	3	1	0	2	3	6	−3	3	
4	Illinois Central College (ICC)	3	0	0	3	2	13	−11	0	

Scores

8:00am EST	Texas Tech	8–1	ICC	Field 7
Thu, November 20		Report		Stadium: Georgia Southern University; Statesboro, Georgia

8:00am EST	JMU "B"	0–3	Morehouse College	Field 8
Thu, November 20		Report		Stadium: Georgia Southern University; Statesboro, Georgia

2:00pm EST	Morehouse College	0–4	Texas Tech	Field 7
Thu, November 20		Report		Stadium: Georgia Southern University; Statesboro, Georgia

2:00pm EST	ICC	1–3	JMU "B"	Field 8
Thu, November 20		Report		Stadium: Georgia Southern University; Statesboro, Georgia

8:00am EST	Texas Tech	2–0	JMU "B"	Field 1
Fri, November 21		Report		Stadium: Georgia Southern University; Statesboro, Georgia

8:00am EST	Morehouse College	2–0	ICC	Field 2
Fri, November 21		Report		Stadium: Georgia Southern University; Statesboro, Georgia

Group F
Pos	Team	Pld	W	D	L	GF	GA	GD	Pts	Qualification
1	Texas "B"	3	3	0	0	14	0	+14	9	Advanced to knockout stage
2	Colorado State	3	2	0	1	9	2	+7	6	Advanced to knockout stage
3	South Dakota Mines	3	1	0	2	5	17	−12	3	
4	Georgia Southern "B"	3	0	0	3	3	12	−9	0	

Scores

10:00am EST	Texas "B"	8–0	South Dakota Mines	Field 5
Thu, November 20		Report		Stadium: Georgia Southern University; Statesboro, Georgia

10:00am EST	Colorado State	3–0	Georgia Southern "B"	Field 6
Thu, November 20		Report		Stadium: Georgia Southern University; Statesboro, Georgia

4:00pm EST	Georgia Southern "B"	0–5	Texas "B"	Field 5
Thu, November 20		Report		Stadium: Georgia Southern University; Statesboro, Georgia

4:00pm EST	South Dakota Mines	1–6	Colorado State	Field 6
Thu, November 20		Report		Stadium: Georgia Southern University; Statesboro, Georgia

8:00am EST	Texas "B"	1–0	Colorado State	Field 3
Fri, November 21		Report		Stadium: Georgia Southern University; Statesboro, Georgia

8:00am EST	Georgia Southern "B"	3–4	South Dakota Mines	Field 4
Fri, November 21		Report		Stadium: Georgia Southern University; Statesboro, Georgia

Group G
Pos	Team	Pld	W	D	L	GF	GA	GD	Pts	Qualification
1	San Antonio College	3	2	0	1	9	9	0	6	Advanced to knockout stage
2	Miami (FL)	3	2	0	1	5	4	+1	6	Advanced to knockout stage
3	Georgia Southern "A"	3	1	1	1	8	7	+1	4	
4	Grand Valley State	3	0	1	2	6	8	−2	1	

Scores

12:00pm EST	San Antonio College	3–2	Miami (FL)	Field 7
Thu, November 20		Report		Stadium: Georgia Southern University; Statesboro, Georgia

12:00pm EST	Grand Valley State	3–3	Georgia Southern "A"	Field 8
Thu, November 20		Report		Stadium: Georgia Southern University; Statesboro, Georgia

6:00pm EST	Georgia Southern "A"	4–2	San Antonio College	Field 10
Thu, November 20		Report		Stadium: Georgia Southern University; Statesboro, Georgia

6:00pm EST	Miami (FL)	1–0	Grand Valley State	Field 11
Thu, November 20		Report		Stadium: Georgia Southern University; Statesboro, Georgia

8:00am EST	San Antonio College	4–3	Grand Valley State	Field 5
Fri, November 21		Report		Stadium: Georgia Southern University; Statesboro, Georgia

8:00am EST	Georgia Southern "A"	1–2	Miami (FL)	Field 6
Fri, November 21		Report		Stadium: Georgia Southern University; Statesboro, Georgia

Group H
Pos	Team	Pld	W	D	L	GF	GA	GD	Pts	Qualification
1	Clemson	3	3	0	0	17	0	+17	9	Advanced to knockout stage
2	Daytona Beach CC	3	2	0	1	12	4	+8	6	Advanced to knockout stage
3	Houston	3	0	1	2	1	12	−11	3	
4	Oxford College	3	0	1	2	1	15	−14	3	

Scores

8:00am EST	Houston	0–0	Oxford College	Field 9
Thu, November 20		Report		Stadium: Georgia Southern University; Statesboro, Georgia

10:00am EST	Clemson	2–0	Daytona Beach CC	Field 9
Thu, November 20		Report		Stadium: Georgia Southern University; Statesboro, Georgia

6:00pm EST	Daytona Beach CC	4–1	Houston	Field 7
Thu, November 20		Report		Stadium: Georgia Southern University; Statesboro, Georgia

6:00pm EST	Oxford College	0–7	Clemson	Field 8
Thu, November 20		Report		Stadium: Georgia Southern University; Statesboro, Georgia

8:00am EST	Houston	0–8	Clemson	Field 7
Fri, November 21		Report		Stadium: Georgia Southern University; Statesboro, Georgia

8:00am EST	Daytona Beach CC	8–1	Oxford College	Field 8
Fri, November 21		Report		Stadium: Georgia Southern University; Statesboro, Georgia

=== Women's open ===
Group O
Pos	Team	Pld	W	D	L	GF	GA	GD	Pts	Qualification
1	Virginia Tech	3	2	1	0	6	2	+4	7	Advanced to knockout stage
2	Florida	3	1	1	1	3	3	0	4	Advanced to knockout stage
3	Colorado State "Green"	3	1	1	1	2	1	+1	4	Advanced to knockout stage
4	Tennessee	3	0	1	2	2	7	−5	1	Advanced to knockout stage

Scores

10:00am EST	Virginia Tech	4–1	Tennessee	Field 7
Thu, November 20		Report		Stadium: Georgia Southern University; Statesboro, Georgia

10:00am EST	Colorado State "Green"	0–1	Florida	Field 8
Thu, November 20		Report		Stadium: Georgia Southern University; Statesboro, Georgia

4:00pm EST	Florida	1–2	Virginia Tech	Field 7
Thu, November 20		Report		Stadium: Georgia Southern University; Statesboro, Georgia

4:00pm EST	Tennessee	0–2	Colorado State "Green"	Field 8
Thu, November 20		Report		Stadium: Georgia Southern University; Statesboro, Georgia

8:00am EST	Virginia Tech	0–0	Colorado State "Green"	Field 9
Fri, November 21		Report		Stadium: Georgia Southern University; Statesboro, Georgia

10:00am EST	Florida	1–1	Tennessee	Field 9
Fri, November 21		Report		Stadium: Georgia Southern University; Statesboro, Georgia

== Tournament bracket ==
=== Men's championship ===
Quarterfinals
Fri • 8:00pm • Field 1
Kansas State	1
JMU	2
Fri • 8:00pm • Field 2
BYU	2
Salt Lake CC	1
Fri • 8:00pm • Field 3
North Carolina (pen.)	3
Oregon	2
Fri • 8:00pm • Field 4
Texas	1
Texas A&M	0

Semifinals
Sat • 10:00am • Field 3
JMU	1
BYU (pen.)	2
Sat • 10:00am • Field 4
North Carolina	1
Texas	5

Final
Sat • 5:00pm • Field 8
Texas	0
BYU (a.e.t.)	1

=== Women's championship ===
Quarterfinals
Fri • 6:00pm • Field 1
Colorado State (a.e.t.)	2
Purdue	1
Fri • 6:00pm • Field 2
North Carolina	3
Salt Lake CC	1
Fri • 6:00pm • Field 3
Penn State	3
Ohio State	1
Fri • 6:00pm • Field 4
JMU (pen.)	3
Colorado	2

Semifinals
Sat • 10:00am • Field 1
Colorado State	3
North Carolina	0
Sat • 10:00am • Field 2
Penn State	2
JMU	1

Final
Sat • 3:00pm • Field 7
Colorado State	1
Penn State	0

=== Men's open ===
Quarterfinals
Fri • 6:00pm • Field 5
Texas Tech	4
Colorado State	1
Fri • 6:00pm • Field 6
San Antonio College	2
Daytona Beach	0
Fri • 8:00pm • Field 5
Texas "B"	5
Miami (FL)	1
Fri • 8:00pm • Field 6
Clemson	3
Morehouse	1

Semifinals
Sat • 8:00am • Field 3
Texas Tech	5
San Antonio College	0
Sat • 8:00am • Field 4
Texas "B" (pen.)	1
Clemson	0

Final
Sat • 1:00pm • Field 5
Texas Tech	4
Texas "B"	1

=== Women's open ===
Semifinals
Sat • 8:00am • Field 1
1	Virginia Tech	3
4	Tennessee	0
Sat • 8:00am • Field 2
2	Florida	0
3	Colorado State	1

Final
Sat • 1:00pm • Field 6
1	Virginia Tech	3
3	Colorado State	2

== All-tournament teams ==
=== Men's championship ===
Name	Team
Steven Crook (Note: Most Valuable Player)	BYU
Mark Hamre	Texas
Nathan Morris	BYU
Tyler Jones	JMU
Tavi Brunson	North Carolina
Bill Brown	Texas
Dom Manbrath	Kansas State
Glenn Puckrin	BYU
Chad Wright	Oregon
Todd White	JMU
Ablakhat Tuleshov	Texas A&M
Eric Landon	Salt Lake CC

=== Women's championship ===
Name	Team
Erin Ortega	Colorado State
Carissa Lawson	Penn State
Casey Hagen	Colorado State
Sonya Nagy	North Carolina
Varna Swartz	JMU
Jamie Miller	Salt Lake CC
Katie Stober	Penn State
Stacie Milam	Colorado
Abby Illyes	Purdue
Jenny Kelly	Colorado State
Courtney Davis	Penn State
Joannah Roseman	North Carolina

=== Men's open ===
Name	Team
Jeff Dupre	Texas Tech
David Burnley	Texas "B"
Quinton Hart	Texas Tech
Justin Pochardt	Clemson
Alex Weedin	Colorado State
Michael Prewitt	Texas "B"
Peter Menendez	Miami (FL)
Chadd Hobbs	Texas Tech
Dwayne Cambridge	Morehouse College
Ivan Ferreris	San Antonio College
Bailey Landress	Texas "B"
Jason Blaize-Coar	Morehouse College
Sportsmanship award
Clemson

=== Women's open ===
Name	Team
Amy Mayer	Virginia Tech
Anna Hansen	Colorado State "Green"
Rebecca Elliott	Virginia Tech
Molly Stickel	Tennessee
Lara Mann	Florida
Shannon Mullen	Virginia Tech
Lisa Schreiber	Colorado State "Green"
Amy Halsey	Tennessee
Lisa Ciraldo	Colorado State "Green"
Carolyn Flowers	Virginia Tech
Shannon Forbes	Colorado State "Green"
Tracy Perrotti	Florida
Sportsmanship award
Tennessee
