= 1996 NIRSA National Soccer Championship =

- League: NIRSA
- Sport: Soccer
- Site: University of Texas; Austin, Texas
- Duration: November 21–23, 1996
- Number of teams: 16 (men's championship); 16 (women's championship); 8 (men's open); 4 (women's open)
- Results: Official Results

Men's Championship Division
- Score: 1–0
- Champion: BYU (1st title, 1st title game)
- Runners-up: Baylor (1st title game)
- Season MVP: Roger Seaman (BYU)

Women's Championship Division
- Score: 1–0
- Champion: Miami (OH) (2nd title, 3rd title game)
- Runners-up: Purdue (1st title game)
- Season MVP: Trisha Barkman (Miami (OH))

Men's Open Division
- Score: 2–0
- Champion: Toledo (1st title, 1st title game)
- Runners-up: Angelo State (1st title game)
- Season MVP: Troy Bingham (Toledo)

Women's Open Division
- Score: 9–0
- Champion: Texas (1st title, 1st title game)
- Runners-up: Rice (1st title game)
- Top seed: Jill Cook (Texas)

NIRSA national soccer championships seasons
- ← 1995 1997 →

The 1996 NIRSA national soccer championship was the 3rd NIRSA National Soccer Championships, the annual national championships for United States-based, collegiate club soccer teams organized by NIRSA. It took place at the University of Texas in Austin, Texas from Thursday, November 21 to Saturday, November 23, 1996.

== Overview ==
=== Men's championship ===
In the finals, BYU would take on Baylor. Prior to this, in the group stage, Baylor would face inaugural champions, Purdue, in their opener and would go down 2–0, but would score four consecutive goals to win 4–2. They'd then beat Northern Colorado 5–0 and finally tied Clemson 2–2 to top their group. Meanwhile, BYU would have a "perfect" group stage in that they'd win all three games by three or more goals without conceding a goal in any game, giving them 30 points. They did this by beating reigning champions and hosts, Texas, 7–0, then North Carolina 6–0, and finally Colorado State 3–0.

In the quarterfinals, Baylor would eliminate in-state rival, host, and reigning champion, Texas, 3–0 while BYU would beat Northern Colorado 10–1 which would be the only game where they conceded a goal this tournament. In the semifinals, Baylor would defeat Salt Lake CC 3–0 while BYU defeated Oregon 3–0. In the finals, BYU's Spencer Viernes would score the lone goal of the match as BYU claimed their first national NIRSA national title. BYU's Roger Seaman would be named tournament MVP.

=== Women's championship ===
In the finals, inaugural champion and reigning runners up, Miami (OH), would face Purdue. Prior to this, in the group stage, Purdue would tie their opener 0–0 to Southern Mississippi, then would defeat Penn State 1–0, and finally beat Tennessee 4–0 to win their group. Meanwhile, Miami (OH) would beat Kansas State 2–0, then would tie JMU 1–1, and finally beat Salt Lake CC 3–2 to top their group as well.

In the quarterfinals, Purdue would beat Clemson 4–1 while Miami (OH) beat Bowling Green 3–0. Following this, Purdue would defeat JMU 2–1 while Miami (OH) beat regional opponent Illinois 1–0 to reach their third finals in as many competitions. Illinois' Erica Loechl would be named the division's best goalkeeper and following this tournament would be a part of Illinois' first varsity team. In the finals, eventual tournament MVP, Trisha Barkman of Miami (OH), would score the lone goal of the match to claim their second title in three seasons, the first team in any division to win two titles.

=== Men's open ===
In the finals, Toledo would face Angelo State. Prior to this, in the group stage, Angelo State would beat Wichita State 6–1 in their opener, then beat Houston 4–0, and finally lost to Tennessee 2–1 but would have enough to advance to the knockout round as the second placed team in the group. Meanwhile, Toledo would lose their opener 2–1 to inaugural open runners-up Texas Tech, then beat Lamar 5–2 to be level on points with them going into the group stage finale with Texas Tech ahead of both teams by 7 points. In the group stage finale, both teams would tie 1–1 with Toledo tying Texas A&M and Lamar tying Texas Tech 1–1, meaning both teams would still be level on points, but Toledo would claim the final knockout round spot due to them having the head-to-head tiebreaker.

In the semifinals, both teams would win 2–1 with Angelo State beating Texas Tech and Toledo being Tennessee. In the finals, Toledo would win 2–0 and claim their first open title. Toledo's Troy Bingham would be name tournament MVP and Toledo would eventual get a formal congratulations from their Mayor, Carty Finkbeiner.

=== Women's open ===
In the finals, in-state rivals Rice and Texas would face off in the team's fourth meeting. Prior to this, in the regular season, the teams tied in their first meeting and Texas defeated Rice in the second. In the opener for both teams, Texas would defeat Colorado State 5–0 while Rice would defeat Texas Tech 2–0 with goals from freshman Tiffany Elkins and sophomore Casey Robinson. In the teams' second game, Texas would defeat Texas Tech 3–0 while Rice would lose to Colorado State 1–0. In the group stage finale, Texas would defeat Rice 6–0 and with Colorado State beating Texas Tech 5–1, going into the knockout round Texas would have the 1 seed and face the 4 seed Texas Tech while Colorado State would have the 2 seed and face 3 seed Rice. In the semifinals, Texas would defeat in-state rival Texas Tech 9–0 while Rice would remain tied 0–0 with Colorado State after regulation and overtime, meaning penalties would be required to determine a winner which Rice would win. In the finals, Texas would defeat Rice 9–0 in what is, as of 2024, the largest score differential in a finals across all 4 divisions. Texas' Jill Cook would be named the tournament's MVP.

== Format ==
The competition consisted of 44 teams partitioned into 24 men's teams and 20 women's teams. Each of these partitions were further divided into a 16-team, invite-only championship division, an 8-team men's open division, and a 4-team women's open division. The championship divisions were divided into four groups of four teams each, the men's open group divided teams into two groups of four teams each, and the women's division placed all the teams into a 4-team group.

All 4 divisions began with a round-robin tournament where each team played each of the other teams in their group once. Following this, the two best teams in each group in the championship division and men's open division advanced to a single-elimination, knockout round. All four teams in the women's open division advanced to their single-elimination, knockout round. The first metric for determining the best team was points, calculated first by giving a team 6 points for a win, 3 points for a tie, and 0 points for a loss. Then, a team could be awarded an addition point for a shutout and an additional point for every goal scored, up to a max of 3 goals per game. If teams were tied on points, the following criteria were used in order:

1. Winner of head-to-head competition
2. Greatest goal difference
3. Most goals scored
4. Coin toss

The knockout stage was an 8-team tournament for the championship divisions and a 4-team tournament for the open divisions. Knockout stage games needed to declare a winner, so if one was tied at the end of regulation, overtime would begin. Overtime in the quarterfinals consisted of two, 5-minute, golden-goal periods while in the semifinals and finals, overtime consisted of two, 10-minute, golden-goal periods. If still tied after overtime, kicks from the mark would determine the winner. Pool play and quarterfinal games were two 40-minute halves, separated by a seven-minute halftime with the semifinals and finals also being 40-minute halves, but having a ten minute halftime. If a player received three yellow cards during the course of the tournament they would be suspended the following the game.

== Qualification and selections ==
NIRSA extended invitations to the 16 men's and 16 women's teams to participate in the championship division beginning on October 23, 1996 with those invitations being extended to who NIRSA believed were the best in the nation. The teams that participated in the open division were chosen on a first-come first-serve basis via mail with registration beginning on September 15, 1996 with a maximum of 24 teams per gender division.

=== Men's championship ===
Participating teams
Region	Team	Appearance	Last Bid
I	Maryland	1st	Never
II	Clemson	1st	Never
II	JMU	1st	Never
II	North Carolina	1st	Never
III	Purdue	3rd	1995
III	Grand Valley State	2nd	1995
III	Miami (OH)	1st	Never
IV	Texas	3rd	1995
IV	Baylor	1st	Never
IV	Kansas	1st	Never
IV	Tulane	1st	Never
V	Colorado State	1st	Never
V	Northern Colorado	1st	Never
VI	Oregon	2nd	1995
VI	Salt Lake CC	2nd	1995
VI	BYU	1st	Never

=== Women's championship ===
Participating teams
Region	Team	Appearance	Last Bid
I	Penn State	2nd	1995
II	Tennessee	2nd	1994
II	Clemson	1st	Never
II	JMU	1st	Never
II	Miami (OH)	2nd	Never
II	Southern Miss	1st	Never
III	Miami (OH)	3rd	1995
III	Purdue	3rd	1995
III	Illinois	2nd	1995
III	Ohio State	2nd	1994
III	Bowling Green	1st	Never
IV	Kansas	1st	Never
IV	Kansas State	1st	Never
V	Colorado	2nd	1995
V	Iowa	2nd	1995
VI	Salt Lake CC	1st	Never
VI	San Diego State	1st	Never

=== Men's open ===
Region	Num	Team
I	0	–
II	1	Tennessee
III	1	Toledo
IV	5	Angelo State, Houston, Lamar, Texas A&M "B", Texas Tech
V	1	Wichita State
VI	0	–

=== Women's open ===
Region	Num	Team
I	0	–
II	0	–
III	0	–
IV	3	Rice, Texas Tech, Texas
V	1	Colorado State
VI	0	–

== Group stage ==
=== Men's championship ===
Group A
Pos	Team	Pld	W	D	L	GF	GA	GD	SO (Note: Shutouts)	GFP (Note: Goals for, points. The points gained by scoring with a max of 3 per game)	Pts	Qualification
1	Salt Lake CC	3	2	1	0	7	5	+2	0	6	21	Advanced to knockout stage
2	Kansas	3	1	1	1	4	4	0	1	4	14	Advanced to knockout stage
3	JMU	3	1	0	2	8	7	+1	0	6	12	
4	Grand Valley	3	0	2	1	5	8	−3	0	5	11	

Scores

10:00am CST	Grand Valley	1–1	Salt Lake CC	Field 3
Thu, November 21		Report		Stadium: University of Texas; Austin, Texas

10:00am CST	JMU	0–1	Kansas	Field 4
Thu, November 21		Report		Stadium: University of Texas; Austin, Texas

4:00pm CST	Kansas	2–2	Grand Valley	Field 3
Thu, November 21		Report		Stadium: University of Texas; Austin, Texas

4:00pm CST	Salt Lake CC	4–3	JMU	Field 4
Thu, November 21		Report		Stadium: University of Texas; Austin, Texas

10:00am CST	Grand Valley	2–5	JMU	Field 3
Fri, November 22		Report		Stadium: University of Texas; Austin, Texas

10:00am CST	Kansas	1–2	Salt Lake CC	Field 4
Fri, November 22		Report		Stadium: University of Texas; Austin, Texas

Group B
Pos	Team	Pld	W	D	L	GF	GA	GD	SO	GFP	Pts	Qualification
1	BYU	3	3	0	0	16	0	+16	3	9	30	Advanced to knockout stage
2	Texas	3	1	1	1	5	9	−4	0	4	13	Advanced to knockout stage
3	North Carolina	3	0	2	1	2	8	−6	0	2	8	
4	Colorado State	3	0	1	2	2	8	−6	0	2	5	

Scores

10:00am CST	Colorado State	1–1	North Carolina	Field 5
Thu, November 21		Report		Stadium: University of Texas; Austin, Texas

10:00am CST	BYU	7–0	Texas	Field 6
Thu, November 21		Report		Stadium: University of Texas; Austin, Texas

4:00pm CST	Texas	4–1	Colorado State	Field 5
Thu, November 21		Report		Stadium: University of Texas; Austin, Texas

4:00pm CST	North Carolina	0–6	BYU	Field 6
Thu, November 21		Report		Stadium: University of Texas; Austin, Texas

10:00am CST	Colorado State	0–3	BYU	Field 5
Fri, November 22		Report		Stadium: University of Texas; Austin, Texas

10:00am CST	Texas	1–1	North Carolina	Field 6
Fri, November 22		Report		Stadium: University of Texas; Austin, Texas

Group C
Pos	Team	Pld	W	D	L	GF	GA	GD	SO	GFP	Pts	Qualification
1	Oregon	3	1	2	0	4	2	+2	1	4	17	Advanced to knockout stage
2	Miami (OH)	3	1	1	1	4	1	+3	2	3	14	Advanced to knockout stage
3	Maryland	3	1	1	1	2	2	0	1	2	12	
4	Tulane	3	1	0	2	2	7	−5	1	2	9	

Scores

12:00pm CST	Tulane	1–0	Maryland	Field 3
Thu, November 21		Report		Stadium: University of Texas; Austin, Texas

12:00pm CST	Miami (OH)	0–0	Oregon	Field 4
Thu, November 21		Report		Stadium: University of Texas; Austin, Texas

6:00pm CST	Oregon	3–1	Tulane	Field 3
Thu, November 21		Report		Stadium: University of Texas; Austin, Texas

6:00pm CST	Maryland	1–0	Miami (OH)	Field 4
Thu, November 21		Report		Stadium: University of Texas; Austin, Texas

10:00am CST	Tulane	0–4	Miami (OH)	Field 7
Fri, November 22		Report		Stadium: University of Texas; Austin, Texas

10:00am CST	Oregon	1–1	Maryland	Field 8
Fri, November 22		Report		Stadium: University of Texas; Austin, Texas

Group D
Pos	Team	Pld	W	D	L	GF	GA	GD	SO	GFP	Pts	Qualification
1	Baylor	3	2	1	0	12	4	+8	1	8	24	Advanced to knockout stage
2	Northern Colorado	3	2	0	1	4	8	−4	1	4	17	Advanced to knockout stage
3	Clemson	3	0	2	1	5	6	−1	0	5	11	
4	Purdue	3	0	1	2	3	6	−3	0	3	6	

Scores

12:00pm CST	Baylor	4–2	Purdue	Field 5
Thu, November 21		Report		Stadium: University of Texas; Austin, Texas

12:00pm CST	Clemson	2–3	Northern Colorado	Field 6
Thu, November 21		Report		Stadium: University of Texas; Austin, Texas

6:00pm CST	Northern Colorado	0–6	Baylor	Field 5
Thu, November 21		Report		Stadium: University of Texas; Austin, Texas

6:00pm CST	Purdue	1–1	Clemson	Field 6
Thu, November 21		Report		Stadium: University of Texas; Austin, Texas

10:00am CST	Baylor	2–2	Clemson	Field 9
Fri, November 22		Report		Stadium: University of Texas; Austin, Texas

10:00am CST	Northern Colorado	1–0	Purdue	Field 10
Fri, November 22		Report		Stadium: University of Texas; Austin, Texas

=== Women's championship ===
Group A
Pos	Team	Pld	W	D	L	GF	GA	GD	SO	GFP	Pts	Qualification
1	Purdue	3	2	1	0	5	0	+5	3	4	22	Advanced to knockout stage
2	Penn State	3	2	0	1	5	1	+4	2	5	19	Advanced to knockout stage
3	Southern Mississippi	3	1	1	1	2	2	0	2	2	13	
4	Tennessee	3	0	0	3	0	9	−9	0	0	0	

Scores

10:00am CST	Southern Miss	0–0	Purdue	Field 7
Thu, November 21		Report		Stadium: University of Texas; Austin, Texas

10:00am CST	Penn State	3–0	Tennessee	Field 8
Thu, November 21		Report		Stadium: University of Texas; Austin, Texas

4:00pm CST	Tennessee	0–2	Southern Miss	Field 7
Thu, November 21		Report		Stadium: University of Texas; Austin, Texas

4:00pm CST	Purdue	1–0	Penn State	Field 8
Thu, November 21		Report		Stadium: University of Texas; Austin, Texas

8:00am CST	Southern Miss	0–2	Penn State	Field 3
Fri, November 22		Report		Stadium: University of Texas; Austin, Texas

8:00am CST	Tennessee	0–4	Purdue	Field 4
Fri, November 22		Report		Stadium: University of Texas; Austin, Texas

Group B
Pos	Team	Pld	W	D	L	GF	GA	GD	SO	GFP	Pts	Qualification
1	Miami (OH)	3	2	1	0	6	3	+3	1	6	22	Advanced to knockout stage
2	JMU	3	2	1	0	4	2	+2	1	4	20	Advanced to knockout stage
3	Salt Lake CC	3	1	0	2	5	6	−1	0	5	11	
4	Kansas State	3	0	0	3	1	5	−4	0	1	1	

Scores

12:00pm CST	Salt Lake CC	1–2	JMU	Field 7
Thu, November 21		Report		Stadium: University of Texas; Austin, Texas

12:00pm CST	Miami (OH)	2–0	Kansas State	Field 8
Thu, November 21		Report		Stadium: University of Texas; Austin, Texas

6:00pm CST	Kansas State	1–2	Salt Lake CC	Field 7
Thu, November 21		Report		Stadium: University of Texas; Austin, Texas

6:00pm CST	JMU	1–1	Miami (OH)	Field 8
Thu, November 21		Report		Stadium: University of Texas; Austin, Texas

8:00am CST	Salt Lake CC	2–3	Miami (OH)	Field 5
Fri, November 22		Report		Stadium: University of Texas; Austin, Texas

8:00am CST	Kansas State	0–1	JMU	Field 6
Fri, November 22		Report		Stadium: University of Texas; Austin, Texas

Group C
Pos	Team	Pld	W	D	L	GF	GA	GD	SO	GFP	Pts	Qualification
1	Illinois	3	3	0	0	13	0	+13	3	8	29	Advanced to knockout stage
2	Clemson	3	1	1	1	8	8	0	1	6	16	Advanced to knockout stage
3	Ohio State	3	1	1	1	5	5	0	1	5	15	
4	Kansas	3	0	0	3	0	13	−13	0	0	0	

Scores

10:00am CST	Ohio State	3–3	Clemson	Field 9
Thu, November 21		Report		Stadium: University of Texas; Austin, Texas

10:00am CST	Illinois	6–0	Kansas	Field 10
Thu, November 21		Report		Stadium: University of Texas; Austin, Texas

4:00pm CST	Kansas	0–2	Ohio State	Field 9
Thu, November 21		Report		Stadium: University of Texas; Austin, Texas

4:00pm CST	Clemson	0–5	Illinois	Field 10
Thu, November 21		Report		Stadium: University of Texas; Austin, Texas

8:00am CST	Ohio State	0–2	Illinois	Field 7
Fri, November 22		Report		Stadium: University of Texas; Austin, Texas

8:00am CST	Kansas	0–5	Clemson	Field 8
Fri, November 22		Report		Stadium: University of Texas; Austin, Texas

Group D
Pos	Team	Pld	W	D	L	GF	GA	GD	SO	GFP	Pts	Qualification
1	Colorado	3	3	0	0	12	4	+8	0	8	26	Advanced to knockout stage
2	Bowling Green	3	2	0	1	9	5	+4	1	7	20	Advanced to knockout stage
3	Iowa	3	1	0	2	10	13	−3	0	8	14	
4	San Diego State	3	0	0	3	4	13	−9	0	4	4	

Scores

12:00pm CST	Bowling Green	5–3	Iowa	Field 9
Thu, November 21		Report		Stadium: University of Texas; Austin, Texas

12:00pm CST	Colorado	5–1	San Diego State	Field 10
Thu, November 21		Report		Stadium: University of Texas; Austin, Texas

6:00pm CST	San Diego State	0–3	Bowling Green	Field 9
Thu, November 21		Report		Stadium: University of Texas; Austin, Texas

6:00pm CST	Iowa	2–5	Colorado	Field 10
Thu, November 21		Report		Stadium: University of Texas; Austin, Texas

8:00am CST	Bowling Green	1–2	Colorado	Field 9
Fri, November 22		Report		Stadium: University of Texas; Austin, Texas

8:00am CST	San Diego State	3–5	Iowa	Field 10
Fri, November 22		Report		Stadium: University of Texas; Austin, Texas

=== Men's open ===
Group E
Pos	Team	Pld	W	D	L	GF	GA	GD	SO	GFP	Pts	Qualification
1	Texas Tech	3	2	1	0	6	3	+3	0	6	21	Advanced to knockout stage
2	Toledo	3	1	1	1	7	5	+2	0	5	14	Advanced to knockout stage
3	Lamar	3	1	1	1	5	7	−2	0	5	14	
4	Texas A&M	3	0	1	2	3	6	−3	0	3	6	

Scores

8:00am CST	Texas Tech	2–1	Toledo	Field 3
Thu, November 21		Report		Stadium: University of Texas; Austin, Texas

8:00am CST	Lamar	2–1	Texas A&M	Field 4
Thu, November 21		Report		Stadium: University of Texas; Austin, Texas

2:00pm CST	Texas A&M	1–3	Texas Tech	Field 3
Thu, November 21		Report		Stadium: University of Texas; Austin, Texas

2:00pm CST	Toledo	5–2	Lamar	Field 4
Thu, November 21		Report		Stadium: University of Texas; Austin, Texas

3:30pm CST	Texas Tech	1–1	Lamar	Field 4
Fri, November 22		Report		Stadium: University of Texas; Austin, Texas

3:30pm CST	Texas A&M	1–1	Toledo	Field 5
Fri, November 22		Report		Stadium: University of Texas; Austin, Texas

Group F
Pos	Team	Pld	W	D	L	GF	GA	GD	SO	GFP	Pts	Qualification
1	Tennessee	3	3	0	0	9	3	+6	1	8	27	Advanced to knockout stage
2	Angelo State	3	2	0	1	11	3	+8	1	7	20	Advanced to knockout stage
3	Houston	3	1	0	2	6	9	−3	0	5	11	
4	Wichita State	3	0	0	3	3	14	−11	0	3	3	

Scores

8:00am CST	Tennessee	3–2	Houston	Field 5
Thu, November 21		Report		Stadium: University of Texas; Austin, Texas

8:00am CST	Angelo State	6–1	Wichita State	Field 6
Thu, November 21		Report		Stadium: University of Texas; Austin, Texas

2:00pm CST	Wichita State	0–4	Tennessee	Field 5
Thu, November 21		Report		Stadium: University of Texas; Austin, Texas

2:00pm CST	Houston	0–4	Angelo State	Field 6
Thu, November 21		Report		Stadium: University of Texas; Austin, Texas

3:30pm CST	Tennessee	2–1	Angelo State	Field 6
Fri, November 22		Report		Stadium: University of Texas; Austin, Texas

3:30pm CST	Wichita State	2–4	Houston	Field 7
Fri, November 22		Report		Stadium: University of Texas; Austin, Texas

=== Women's open ===
Pos	Team	Pld	W	D	L	GF	GA	GD	SO	GFP	Pts	Qualification
1	Texas	3	3	0	0	14	0	+14	3	9	30	Advanced to knockout stage
2	Colorado State	3	2	0	1	6	6	0	1	4	17	Advanced to knockout stage
3	Rice	3	1	0	2	2	7	−5	1	2	9	Advanced to knockout stage
4	Texas Tech	3	0	0	3	1	10	−9	0	1	1	Advanced to knockout stage

Scores

8:00am CST	Texas Tech	0–2	Rice	Field 7
Thu, November 21		Report		Stadium: University of Texas; Austin, Texas

8:00am CST	Colorado State	0–5	Texas	Field 8
Thu, November 21		Report		Stadium: University of Texas; Austin, Texas

2:00pm CST	Texas	3–0	Texas Tech	Field 7
Thu, November 21		Report		Stadium: University of Texas; Austin, Texas

2:00pm CST	Rice	0–1	Colorado State	Field 8
Thu, November 21		Report		Stadium: University of Texas; Austin, Texas

3:30pm CST	Texas Tech	1–5	Colorado State	Field 8
Fri, November 22		Report		Stadium: University of Texas; Austin, Texas

3:30pm CST	Texas	6–0	Rice	Field 9
Fri, November 22		Report		Stadium: University of Texas; Austin, Texas

== Tournament bracket ==
=== Men's championship ===
Quarterfinals
Fri • 7:30pm • Field 4
Salt Lake CC (pen.)	2
Miami (OH)	1
Fri • 7:30pm • Field 5
Baylor	3
Texas	0
Fri • 7:30pm • Field 6
BYU	10
Northern Colorado	1
Fri • 7:30pm • Field 7
Oregon	1
Kansas	0

Semifinals
Sat • 10:00am • Field 4
Salt Lake CC	0
Baylor	3
Sat • 10:00am • Field 5
BYU	3
Oregon	0

Final
Sat • 5:30pm • Field 3
Baylor	0
BYU	1

=== Women's championship ===
Quarterfinals
Fri • 5:30pm • Field 4
Purdue	4
Clemson	1
Fri • 5:30pm • Field 5
Colorado	0
JMU (a.e.t.)	1
Fri • 5:30pm • Field 6
Miami (OH)	3
Bowling Green	0
Fri • 5:30pm • Field 7
Illinois (pen.)	1
Penn State	0

Semifinals
Sat • 10:00am • Field 6
Purdue	2
JMU	1
Sat • 10:00am • Field 7
Miami (OH)	1
Illinois	0

Final
Sat • 3:00pm • Field 3
Purdue	0
Miami (OH)	1

=== Men's open ===
Semifinals
Sat • 8:00am • Field 7
1E	Texas Tech	1
2F	Angelo State	2
Sat • 8:00am • Field 8
2E	Toledo	2
1F	Tennessee	1

Final
Sat • 1:00pm • Field 6
2F	Angelo State	0
2E	Toledo	2

=== Women's open ===
Semifinals
Sat • 8:00am • Field 9
1	Texas	9
4	Texas Tech	0
Sat • 8:00am • Field 10
3	Rice (pen.)	1
2	Colorado State	0

Final
Sat • 1:00pm • Field 5
1	Texas	9
3	Rice	0

== All-tournament teams ==
Key
MVP
Best goalkeeper

=== Men's championship ===
Position	Name	Team
Midfielder	Roger Seaman	BYU
GK	Scott Carlson	Miami (OH)
Forward	Jarred Henderson	Salt Lake CC
Forward	Jon Lovell	BYU
Forward	Greg Coke	Texas
Forward	Ryan Aandervel	Oregon
Midfielder	Clement Yeh	Baylor
Midfielder	Brad Peterson	BYU
Midfielder	Josh Yates	Baylor
Defender	Jon Miller	Salt Lake CC
Defender	Mike Parks	Baylor
Defender	Nathan Morris	BYU

=== Women's championship ===
	Name	Team
Forward	Trisha Barkman	Miami (OH)
GK	Erica Loechl	Illinois
Forward	Samantha Butke	Clemson
Forward	Kristin Swenson	Miami (OH)
Forward	Paula Kelton	JMU
Midfielder	Brandi Duffy	Penn State
Midfielder	Brittan Hlista	Colorado
Midfielder	Abby Illyes	Purdue
Midfielder	Francie Rank	Purdue
Defender	Nicole Notarianni	Bowling Green
Defender	Katie Hall	Miami (OH)
Defender	Karen Keitzer	Purdue

=== Men's open ===
Position	Name	Team
Midfielder	Troy Bingham	Toledo
GK	Shawn Wallace	Texas Tech
Forward	John Gross	Tennessee
Forward	Bryan Rapp	Toledo
Forward	Kyle Doty	Angelo State
Forward	Matt Bryant	Angelo State
Midfielder	Mike Dawdy	Texas Tech
Midfielder	Ryan Miles	Tennessee
Midfielder	Mike Loisel	Toledo
Defender	Luke Vosburg	Angelo State
Defender	Matt Rappe	Tennessee
Defender	Jarred Graves	Texas Tech

=== Women's open ===
Position	Name	Team
Forward	Jill Cook	Texas
GK	LaTisha Braddock	Texas Tech
Forward	Leslie Nouri	Texas Tech
Forward	Aimee Henley	Texas
Forward	Brooke Cotter	Rice
Midfielder	Rebecca Resich	Colorado State
Midfielder	Kristen Anderson	Texas
Midfielder	Amy Chlapowski	Rice
Midfielder	Amy Boyce	Texas
Defender	Casey Robinson	Rice
Defender	Marissa Bartlett	Colorado State
Defender	Kelley Young	Texas
