= NIRSA National Soccer Championships =

American collegiate club soccer seasons

- League: NIRSA
- Teams: 24
- Founded: 1994; 31 years ago
- Website: Official website

Men's Championship Division
- Current Champion: BYU (12th title)
- Most Successful Club(s): BYU (12 titles)

Women's Championship Division
- Current Champion: Michigan State (3rd title)
- Most Successful Club(s): UC Santa Barbara (8 titles)

Men's Open Division
- Current Champion: Cal Poly (1st title)
- Most Successful Club(s): JMU (3 titles)

Women's Open Division
- Current Champion: UCLA (4th title)
- Most Successful Club(s): UCLA (4 titles)

Current season (2025)

The NIRSA National Soccer Championships is an annual collegiate club competition organized by the National Intramural and Recreational Sports Association (NIRSA), deciding the competition winners through a round robin group stage to qualify for a single-elimination knockout format.

The tournament is unique because it is limited to teams representing a university on a non-varsity level. Due to collegiate clubs receiving little to no funding from the university they represent, their ability to travel is limited and why the tournament takes place over a single weekend; typically in late November to early December.

== History ==
=== Beginnings ===
In 1994, following the United States hosting its first World Cup and advancing out of the group stage for the first time in 60 years, NIRSA made the decision to stage its first national soccer championship in Austin, Texas. To separate itself from other collegiate club competitions, NIRSA decided to focus on three main aspects: being run by entities with collegiate program affiliation, creating a serious and competitive atmosphere, and developing the women's game.

The tournament started with 15 teams split into two divisions: seven teams in a men's division and eight teams in a women's division. Despite the fact so few teams attended the initial tournament, the following year NIRSA would further split the tournament into a championship division and an open division where the championship division would be invite-only while the open division would be first come first serve. The decision to create a “championship” division and limit the teams that could participate in it created a greater interest in the tournament and lead to a 133% growth in the number of teams in the following tournament with 35 participating teams. However, the open division wasn't without controversy as the very first men's open tournament title was taken away from the finals winners, Rice, who were deemed to have used ineligible players, forfeiting their title to Texas' "B" team. However, to date, this is the only instance of this occurring in an open division and other than the 2003 Illinois men's championship forfeiture, was the only instance a title winning team would forfeit their title. The 1995 tournament is also the only time a title was given to the runners-up (the 2003 men's championship division title was vacated and not awarded to any team).

To aid in the championship division selection process, NIRSA appointed regional coordinators, beginning in 1995, that would be able to select the teams most deserving of a bid to the tournament. The first regional tournaments were run by outside entities as opposed to being NIRSA-affiliated, but eventually all six regions would be run by NIRSA directly.

=== Fall of the NCSA and first 10 years ===
With its origins pre-dating those of the NIRSA soccer championships, the National Collegiate Soccer Association (NCSA) was considered to have the highest level of club soccer competition in the nation. However, when NIRSA developed their own rival competition, more and more teams began choosing NIRSA over the NCSA. NCSA began falling apart and eventually was dismantled in 1999, with the 1998 national championship being its last held tournament.

The fall of the NCSA meant that now NIRSA, unarguably, had the highest competition level of any national collegiate club soccer tournament. This fall also meant that teams no longer had to choose which tournament they believed was better to join, which further contributed to the growth of the league. After the last NCSA national tournament, the NIRSA national soccer championship grew by 33% in three years from 54 participants in 1998 to 72 participants in 2001.

Despite this rise in competition, the first 10 years of the men's championship bracket was dominated by a single team: BYU who won 5 championships in the first 8 years of the tournament despite not participating in the first 2 tournaments in order to attend the NCSA tournament. This run also included a 28-game national championship tournament win streak from 1996–2000, which is still the longest of any team across all four divisions. The streak was ended in the 2000 championships by eventual champions, Penn State, via a penalty shootout in the semifinals which was their first non-win since they began playing in the tournament. The following year of 2001, BYU once again dominated the tournament, winning all six of their games and not only claiming their fifth title, but significantly outscoring their opponents with 26 goals for and only 5 goals against, with 3 of those goals conceded coming in the group stage finale against Texas. In 2002, looking to defend their title, BYU once again made its way to the finals where the title defenders would lose their crown via a 2–0 loss to their in-state rival Weber State. After this loss, BYU left NIRSA after establishing a franchise in the Premier Development League (later renamed to USL League Two), leaving the national tournament without its most successful team and opening up the tournament to other competitors.

Meanwhile, during the same first 10 years of the competition, the women's championship division saw several teams trading titles. By the 2003 tournament, the women's championship had four teams that had won multiple championships: Miami of Ohio, Colorado, Colorado State, and Michigan. Despite this fact, no team had gone back-to-back until the 2004 championships which saw rain cancelling the semi-finals, and subsequently naming four co-champions, one of which being defending champion Colorado. Three of these co-champions were repeat winners (Colorado, Colorado State, and Michigan) and the only co-champion without a previous title being a team that would go on to become the most successful team in the women's championship: UC Santa Barbara.

=== UC Santa Barbara's women's championship dominance ===
Three years after being named co-champion in the 2004 tournament, in 2007, UC Santa Barbara's women's team won its first outright championship tournament over reigning champions San Diego State in a penalty shoot-out while the men's team also won their first championship title. UCSB would then win the next four tournaments, from 2008-2011, giving them the longest streak of tournament championships across all four divisions with 5-straight titles, a record they still hold. The 2011 championship for UCSB also meant they had the most total titles for a single team across all four divisions (6), overtaking BYU who had 5 titles in the men's championship division. During this time, UCSB gained the longest women's national championship win streak with 21-straight wins from 2009 to 2012. The streak was ended in the finals of the 2012 championships in extra time to eventual champions Michigan State. This is the second longest national championship win streak, only behind BYU's 28-game win streak in the men's championship division from 1996–2000. The following year, the 2013 tournament saw the first time no champion was crowned for all four divisions due to rain cancelling play on the last day of the tournament. Following titles from Ohio State and Michigan State in 2014 and 2015 respectively, UCSB continued their winning ways by winning two straight titles again in 2016 and 2017, giving them their seventh and eighth titles.

Meanwhile, in the men's championship, it was discovered that in 2003, Illinois used ineligible players during their championship run, resulting in the first instance, since the inaugural 1995 men's open championship, where a championship was forfeited, and the only instance where no champion was crowned following the forfeiture. In 2007, the first penalty shootout was used to determine the men's national championship when UC Santa Barbara defeated Texas Tech 4–1 following a 0–0 game in regulation and overtime. This gave Texas Tech their fourth finals defeat in their four total finals appearances. The 2009 tournament saw Weber State win their second championship, only the second team to do so in the men's championship. Colorado would become the third, and most recent, team to do so the next year in 2010.

=== Return of BYU's men's team ===
In 2017, BYU's men's soccer club left the PDL after 15 years to rejoin NIRSA. Despite missing 14 of the last 23 tournaments, BYU was still the men's most successful men's championship club with 5 national championships in just the first eight iterations of the competition. As if they had never left, BYU immediately continued its winning ways by winning the 2017 tournament. However, the following tournament, in 2018, BYU was eliminated in the quarterfinals to eventual champions, Florida, marking the only time the team has not made the finals while participating in this tournament. Following this defeat, BYU would win the following 6 tournaments, breaking their own record of 4 consecutive titles in the men's division and overtaking UC-Santa Barbara's women's team's record across all 4 divisions of 5 consecutive titles. In 2022, BYU would retake sole possession of honor of having the most total titles for a single team across all four divisions with its ninth championship, overtaking UC Santa Barbara's women's team who had 8 championship titles. Following the 2023 tournament, BYU would become the first team with 10 titles and extend that record to 12 following the 2024 and 2025 tournaments during their 6 consecutive title run.

During this time, the women's championship would see, for only its second team, a back-to-back champion in Ohio State who won in 2018 and 2019. The 2023 tournament saw, for the first time since 2006, their most successful team, UC-Santa Barbara, not qualifying for the championship division and finishing second in the open division after a 2-1 overtime loss to 2006 national champion San Diego State. UCLA would also take sole possession of most open titles with their 4th title following the 2025 tournament.

== Regions ==
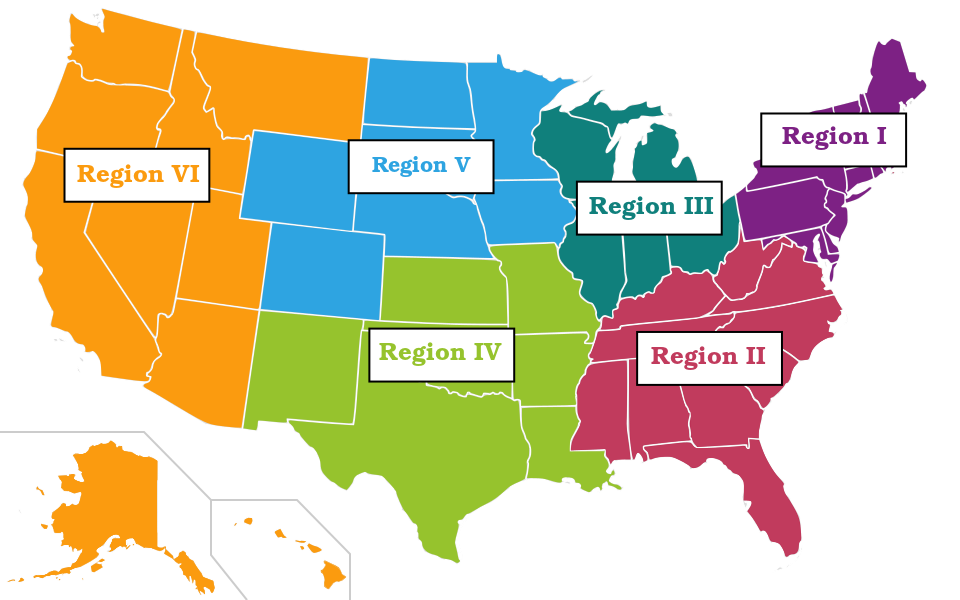
Current regional alignment

As the national tournament grew, a regional system was necessary to assist with national rankings, tournament seedings, and player eligibility. Regional tournaments did not start under the NIRSA umbrella, instead outside entities ran many of the initial tournaments. However, as the seasons progressed, NIRSA increased their direct supervision of tournaments and now all tournaments have NIRSA representation, including direct management from the NIRSA-appointed regional coordinators.

Regional Alignment
Region	Name	States
I	Region I Club Soccer	Connecticut, Delaware, Maine, Maryland, Massachusetts, New Hampshire, New Jersey, New York, Pennsylvania, Rhode Island, Vermont
II	Southeast Collegiate Soccer Alliance	Alabama, Florida, Georgia, Kentucky, Mississippi, North Carolina, South Carolina, Tennessee, Virginia, West Virginia
III	Midwest Alliance Soccer Conference	Illinois, Indiana, Michigan, Ohio, Wisconsin
IV	Region IV Collegiate Club Soccer	Arkansas, Kansas, Louisiana, Missouri, New Mexico, Oklahoma, Texas
V	Region V Soccer	Colorado, Iowa, Minnesota, Nebraska, North Dakota, South Dakota, Wyoming
VI	Region VI Collegiate Club Soccer	Alaska, Arizona, Hawaii, Idaho, Montana, Nevada, California, Oregon, Utah, Washington

Titles by region
	Men's				Women's			
Region	Championship		Open		Championship		Open	
Region	#	Years	#	Years	#	Years	#	Years
Region I	1	2000	2	2016, 2021	2	2001, 2021	2	2002, 2007
Region II	3	2015, 2016, 2018	3	1999, 2000, 2009	0	–	8	1997, 1999, 2000, 2005, 2009, 2012, 2016, 2021
Region III	5	1994, ~~2003~~, (Note: Illinois relinquished their title when it was discovered that they used ineligible players) 2006, 2008, 2012, 2014	4	1996, 2001, 2019, 2023	12	1994, 1996, 2000, 2002, 2004, (Note: Due to rain canceling the semi-finals, all four semi-finalists named co-champions) 2005, 2012, 2014, 2015, 2018, 2019, 2025	3	1995, 2010, 2014
Region IV	2	1995, 2004	5	1995, 1997, 1998, 2002, 2007	0	–	2	1996, 2011
Region V	2	2005, 2010	1	2024	7	1995, 1997, 1998, 1999, 2003, 2004, 2004	3	1998, 2001, 2024
Region VI	16	1996, 1997, 1998, 1999, 2001, 2002, 2007, 2009, 2011, 2017, 2019, 2021, 2022, 2023, 2024, 2025	14	2003, 2005, 2006, 2008, 2010, 2011, 2012, 2014, 2015, 2017, 2018, (Note: Due to rain canceling the finals, both finalists named co-champions, both Region VI teams) 2018, 2022, 2025	12	2004, 2006, 2007, 2008, 2009, 2010, 2011, 2016, 2017, 2022, 2023, 2024	10	2003, 2006, 2008, 2015, 2017, 2018, 2019, 2022, 2023, 2025

== Formats ==
=== Early formats ===
Despite changing frequently, the format consistently remained a two stage tournament beginning with a round-robin group stage followed by a single-elimination knockout stage where group play standings were determined by the three-point system.

In the men's championship division, after starting with seven and eleven teams in their first two years respectively, the division moved to a 16-team format. Teams were divided into four groups of four teams and the top two teams from each group advanced to an 8-team knockout-round. This format was used for 7 years. In 2003, the tournament expanded to 24 teams utilizing an unconventional format. Teams were divided into four groups, each of them consisting of two pools of three teams each. In each of the pools, one team played both teams in its pool while the other two teams played a team from the other pool of its group. The top four teams from each of the four pools advanced to a 16-team knockout-round. Following this, the tournament implemented its current format. However, with rain cancelling the semi-finals, the tournament ended up continuing with a three-game group stage in Arizona a month later (UNC declined invitation to continue the tournament). The men have not changed their format since the 2004 tournament.

The women's championship division, like its male counterparts, began from humble beginnings with eight and twelve teams in its first two years respectively. The division moved to a 16-team format in 1996 with teams divided into four groups of four teams and the top two teams from each group advancing to an 8-team knockout-round. This format was held until 2009 when the tournament expanded to 24 teams. The current format was implemented and has remained with that format ever since.

Just like the championship divisions, the open divisions started off slow beginning a year after the first iteration of the competition in 1995 with only 6 teams each. The number of teams fluctuated year to year, but starting in 2000 the aim was to have 16 teams in each division. This was the case until 2004 when both open divisions expanded to have 20 teams divided into five groups of four advancing to an 8-team knockout-round. In 2005, the open divisions decreased to 16 teams again, and divided teams into four groups of four advancing to a round of 8. This was the format until 2012, when both open divisions implemented their current format.

No changes in the format have been made for any division since 2012.

=== Current format ===
==== Qualification and selections ====
Since 2009, each of the six regions were given three automatic bids to hand out amongst its members. Regions use their own intra-regional tournament to decide at least one of the bids they'll hand out. The remaining six bids are considered "at-large" and are given out by NIRSA once all regional play has concluded. The RPI system is favored when selecting at-large bids.

How bids are given out to championship teams
Region	First bid	Second bid	Third bid
Region I	Regional Tournament Co-Champion	Regional Tournament Co-Champion	Highest Power Ranked Team
Region II	Winner of Regional Tournament	Runner-up of Regional Tournament	Highest ranked team in Region II after Regional Tournament (Note: The RPI ranking upon completion of the tournament with special consideration paid to tournament performance.)
Region III (Men)	Regional Tournament Co-Champion	Regional Tournament Co-Champion	Highest Power Ranked Team
Region III (Women)	Winner of Regional Tournament	Highest Power Ranked Team after regional tournament	2nd highest Power Ranked Team after regional tournament
Region IV	South Tournament Bid; Game 1 Champion	South Tournament Bid; Game 2 Champion	North Tournament; Champion
Region V	Pool Play; Winner	Pool Play; Winner	Bracket Play; Winner
Region VI	North Tournament; Champion	South Tournament; Champion	South Tournament; Runner-up

Notes:

Prior to the 2014 tournament, the open division was decided on a first come, first serve basis. However, due to the growing popularity, the open division has utilized a lottery system to select it's participating teams since 2014. The lottery is run prior to championship teams receiving a bid and 24 teams are initially selected: 4 teams from each region. After this, the remaining teams in each region are placed, in order, on the waitlist in the event one of the 24 teams is promoted to the championship division or if a team drops. If a region didn't have 4 teams apply for the lottery, other regions would have their waitlist teams fill those spots. To enter a name in the lottery, a team must have a membership in a NIRSA-affiliated league or have played at least four games against NIRSA-affiliated teams prior to the lottery selection.

==== Rules of play ====
The current format is a two stage tournament: a round-robin group stage followed by a single-elimination knockout stage

For the championship division group stage, the 24 teams are split into eight groups of three teams each. Each team plays every other team in their group. A total of 3 games are played within a group. The top two teams from each group advance to the round of 16 while the third placed team advances to a consolation bracket; both brackets become knockout competitions.

For the open division group stage, the 24 teams are split into six groups of four teams each. Each team plays every other team in their group. This means that a total of 6 games are played within a group. The six group winners, six runners-up, and the four best third placed teams advance to the round of 16 which becomes a knockout competition. The remaining teams are eliminated.

To determine group standings, the three-point system (three points for a win, one point for a draw, no points for a loss) is used. In the event two teams are tied on points after the group stage, ranking is determined as follows:

1. Winner in head-to-head competition in group play
2. Greatest goal differential (Max ±5 from any one match)
3. Greatest number of goals scored in group play
4. Greatest number of shutouts
5. NCAA kicks from the mark thirty minutes prior to next scheduled match

In the event all three teams are tied, steps 2–4 are once again used. If one team beats the other two teams in a tie breaker, they are ranked highest, then the remaining two teams restart the tie-breaking procedure. In the event all three teams are still tied after all 4 steps, a coin flip is conducted for each team. If one team gets a different result from both other teams, the two teams that tied compete in NCAA kicks from the mark where the winner then competes with the remaining team in NCAA kicks from the mark.

The knockout stage is a single-elimination tournament, in which each team plays in a one-off match. In the event of a tie, two periods of extra time are used to decide the winner, with penalty shootouts being the final tie-breaker if one is still needed. The 16 advancing teams are seeded such that a group winner plays the runner-up of another group and where teams from the same group are placed on opposite ends of the bracket.

Games consist of two 40-minute halves. For pool play, round of 16, and quarterfinals halves are separated by a seven-minute halftime while the halves for the semifinals and finals are separated by a ten-minute halftime.

== Results ==
=== Men's championship division ===
Below is a complete list of known finals held:

Key
Match was won during extra time
Match was won on a penalty shoot-out

List of men's soccer championships
Year	Winner	Score	Runner up	Venue	Location	Ref.
1994	Purdue	2–1	Washington State	University of Texas	Austin, Texas	
1995	Texas	5–0	Kansas State	University of Texas	Austin, Texas	
1996	BYU	1–0	Baylor	University of Texas	Austin, Texas	
1997	BYU (2)	1–0 (a.e.t.)	Texas	Georgia Southern	Statesboro, Georgia	
1998	BYU (3)	4–0	Texas Tech	Georgia Southern	Statesboro, Georgia	
1999	BYU (4)	1–0	Texas Tech	Georgia Southern	Statesboro, Georgia	
2000	Penn State	2–0	Texas Tech	University of Texas	Austin, Texas	
2001	BYU (5)	4–0	Illinois	University of Alabama	Tuscaloosa, Alabama	
2002	Weber State	2–0	BYU	Kern County Soccer Complex	Bakersfield, California	
2003	~~Illinois~~ (Note: Illinois would later vacate their title after it was discovered that they used ineligible players. Utah Valley State would be named a finalist but not given the title)	2–0	Utah Valley State	University of Alabama	Tuscaloosa, Alabama	
2004	Texas A&M	(Note: Semifinals cancelled due to rain. A continuation was held Jan. 8th, 2005 in Mesa, AZ. North Carolina declined the invitation, meaning a three team round robin would occur. Colorado State beat UC-Berkeley 2–0, Texas A&M beat Colorado State 1–0, and Texas A&M beat UC-Berkeley 2–0 making Texas A&M champions, Colorado State runners-up, UC-Berkeley third place, and North Carolina fourth place)	Colorado State (2nd) UC Berkeley (3rd)	University of Texas → Red Mountain Complex	Austin, TX → Mesa, AZ	
2005	Colorado	2–1 (a.e.t.)	Vanderbilt	University of Alabama	Tuscaloosa, Alabama	
2006	Michigan	1–0	Illinois	Arizona State University	Tempe, Arizona	
2007	UC Santa Barbara	0–0 (a.e.t.) (4–1 p)	Texas Tech	University of West Florida	Pensacola, Florida	
2008	Indiana	1–0	Colorado State	University of Alabama	Tuscaloosa, Alabama	
2009	Weber State (2)	0–0 (a.e.t.) (3–2 p)	Florida	Reach 11 Sports Complex	Phoenix, Arizona	
2010	Colorado (2)	3–1	Missouri	Reach 11 Sports Complex	Phoenix, Arizona	
2011	Weber State (3)	0–0 (a.e.t.) (4–3 p)	Missouri	Reach 11 Sports Complex	Phoenix, Arizona	
2012	Michigan State	0–0 (a.e.t.) (4–2 p)	Weber State	Mike Rose Soccer Complex	Memphis, Tennessee	
2013	Cancelled due to rain			Reach 11 Sports Complex	Phoenix, Arizona	
2014	Ohio State	1–0 (a.e.t.)	San Diego State	Mike Rose Soccer Complex	Memphis, Tennessee	
2015	North Carolina	2–0	Penn State	Reach 11 Sports Complex	Phoenix, Arizona	
2016	Virginia	3–2	Ohio State	Foley Sports Tourism Complex	Foley, Alabama	
2017	BYU (6)	4–1	Cal Poly	Reach 11 Sports Complex	Phoenix, Arizona	
2018	Florida	1–0 (Note: Semifinals were cancelled due to rain. A continuation was held Jan. 26th, 2019 at UNC-Charlotte's Rec Fields. Also included a third place match where Ohio State beat Virginia Tech 3–1) (a.e.t.)	North Carolina	Foley Sports Complex → Charlotte Rec Fields	Foley, AL → Charlotte, NC	
2019	BYU (7)	3–1	Ohio State	Round Rock Multipurpose Complex	Round Rock, Texas	
2020	Not held due to the COVID-19 pandemic.				N/A	
2021	BYU (8)	3–1	Texas	Foley Sports Tourism Complex	Foley, Alabama	
2022	BYU (9)	2–1	Minnesota	Round Rock Multipurpose Complex	Round Rock, Texas	
2023	BYU (10)	2–0	Virginia Tech	Round Rock Multipurpose Complex	Round Rock, Texas	
2024	BYU (11)	0–0 (a.e.t.) (6–5 p)	Ohio State	Round Rock Multipurpose Complex	Round Rock, Texas	
2025	BYU (11)	2–0	UCLA	Scheels Overland Park Soccer Complex	Overland Park, Kansas	

=== Women's championship division ===
Below is a complete list of known finals held:

Key
Match was won during extra time
Match was won on a penalty shoot-out

List of women's soccer championships
Year	Winner	Score	Runner up	Venue	Location	Ref.
1994	Miami (OH)	2–0	Florida	University of Texas	Austin, Texas	
1995	Colorado	4–0	Miami (OH)	University of Texas	Austin, Texas	
1996	Miami (OH) (2)	1–0	Purdue	University of Texas	Austin, Texas	
1997	Colorado State	1–0	Penn State	Georgia Southern	Statesboro, Georgia	
1998	Colorado (2)	0–0 (a.e.t.) (4–3 p)	Penn State	Georgia Southern	Statesboro, Georgia	
1999	Colorado State (2)	0–0 (a.e.t.) (3–1 p)	Michigan	Georgia Southern	Statesboro, Georgia	
2000	Michigan	1–0 (a.e.t.)	Ohio State	University of Texas	Austin, Texas	
2001	Penn State	1–0	UC Santa Barbara	University of Alabama	Tuscaloosa, Alabama	
2002	Michigan (2)	2–1	Colorado	Kern County Soccer Complex	Bakersfield, California	
2003	Colorado (3)	1–0	Miami (OH)	University of Alabama	Tuscaloosa, Alabama	
2004	UC Santa Barbara, Colorado (4), Colorado State (3), Michigan (3) (Note: Due to rain canceling the semi-finals, all four semi-finalists named co-champions)			University of Texas	Austin, Texas	
2005	Michigan (4)	2–1 (a.e.t.)	Colorado State	University of Alabama	Tuscaloosa, Alabama	
2006	San Diego State	2–1	Colorado	Arizona State University	Tempe, Arizona	
2007	UC Santa Barbara (2)	1–1 (a.e.t.) (4–1 p)	San Diego State	University of West Florida	Pensacola, Florida	
2008	UC Santa Barbara (3)	4–1	Arizona	University of Alabama	Tuscaloosa, Alabama	
2009	UC Santa Barbara (4)	2–0	Penn State	Reach 11 Sports Complex	Phoenix, Arizona	
2010	UC Santa Barbara (5)	1–1 (a.e.t.) (5–4 p)	Texas	Reach 11 Sports Complex	Phoenix, Arizona	
2011	UC Santa Barbara (6)	1–0	Cal Poly	Reach 11 Sports Complex	Phoenix, Arizona	
2012	Michigan State	2–1 (a.e.t.)	UC Santa Barbara	Mike Rose Soccer Complex	Memphis, Tennessee	
2013	Cancelled due to rain			Reach 11 Sports Complex	Phoenix, Arizona	
2014	Ohio State	2–0	Miami (OH)	Mike Rose Soccer Complex	Memphis, Tennessee	
2015	Michigan State (2)	1–0 (a.e.t.)	Colorado State	Reach 11 Sports Complex	Phoenix, Arizona	
2016	UC Santa Barbara (7)	1–0	North Carolina	Foley Sports Tourism Complex	Foley, Alabama	
2017	UC Santa Barbara (8)	3–0	Texas	Reach 11 Sports Complex	Phoenix, Arizona	
2018	Ohio State (2)	2–0 (Note: Semifinals were cancelled due to rain. A continuation was held Feb. 23, 2019 at Vanderbilt University's Rec Fields. Rain postponed the continuation, pushing the finals to early Feb. 24, 2019)	UC Davis	Foley Sports Complex → Natchez Trace Fields	Foley, AL → Nashville, TN	
2019	Ohio State (3)	2–1	Boston College	Round Rock Multipurpose Complex	Round Rock, Texas	
2020	Not held due to the COVID-19 pandemic.				N/A	
2021	Penn State (2)	1–0	North Carolina	Foley Sports Tourism Complex	Foley, Alabama	
2022	Cal Poly	1–0 (a.e.t.)	UConn	Round Rock Multipurpose Complex	Round Rock, Texas	
2023	UCLA	1–0	Boston College	Round Rock Multipurpose Complex	Round Rock, Texas	
2024	Cal Poly (2)	1-0	UCLA	Round Rock Multipurpose Complex	Round Rock, Texas	
2025	Michigan State (3)	0–0 (a.e.t.) (4–3 p)	San Diego State	Scheels Overland Park Soccer Complex	Overland Park, Kansas	

=== Men's open division ===
Below is a complete list of known finals held:

Key
Match was won during extra time
Match was won on a penalty shoot-out

List of men's open soccer championships
Year	Winner	Score	Runner up	Venue	Location	Ref.
1995	~~Rice~~; Texas "B"	(Note: Rice defeated Texas Tech 2-1 (a.e.t.) in the semifinals then defeated Texas "B" 1(4)-1(3) in penalties in the finals. However, it was determined that Rice used ineligible players and tournament officials gave Texas "B" the title and labeled Texas Tech as the runners-up)	Texas Tech	University of Texas	Austin, Texas	
1996	Toledo	2–0	Angelo State	University of Texas	Austin, Texas	
1997	Texas Tech	4–1	Texas "B"	Georgia Southern	Statesboro, Georgia	
1998	LSU	1-0	Virginia	Georgia Southern	Statesboro, Georgia	
1999	JMU	2–0	Florida State	Georgia Southern	Statesboro, Georgia	
2000	JMU (2)	2–0	Oregon	University of Texas	Austin, Texas	
2001	Ohio State	3–2	Texas Tech	University of Alabama	Tuscaloosa, Alabama	
2002	Texas A&M	4–0	Penn State	Kern County Soccer Complex	Bakersfield, California	
2003	UC-Santa Barbara	1–0	JMU	University of Alabama	Tuscaloosa, Alabama	
2004	Cancelled due to rain			University of Texas	Austin, Texas	
2005	Oregon	2–0	UC Berkeley	University of Alabama	Tuscaloosa, Alabama	
2006	Arizona State	3–1	Kansas	Arizona State University	Tempe, Arizona	
2007	Missouri	1–1 (a.e.t.) (4–2 p)	Kansas	University of West Florida	Pensacola, Florida	
2008	UC Berkeley	5–0	Northern Iowa	University of Alabama	Tuscaloosa, Alabama	
2009	JMU (3)	1–1 (a.e.t.) (6–5 p)	San Diego State	Reach 11 Sports Complex	Phoenix, Arizona	
2010	Cal Poly "B"	2–1 (a.e.t.)	JMU	Reach 11 Sports Complex	Phoenix, Arizona	
2011	UC San Diego	5–0	Texas "B"	Reach 11 Sports Complex	Phoenix, Arizona	
2012	San Diego State	1–1 (a.e.t.) (4–3 p)	UC Berkeley	Mike Rose Soccer Complex	Memphis, Tennessee	
2013	Cancelled due to rain			Reach 11 Sports Complex	Phoenix, Arizona	
2014	UC Berkeley (2)	2–1	UCF	Mike Rose Soccer Complex	Memphis, Tennessee	
2015	Oregon (2)	3–2	UC Davis	Reach 11 Sports Complex	Phoenix, Arizona	
2016	Penn State	2–1	Oregon	Foley Sports Tourism Complex	Foley, Alabama	
2017	Arizona	1–0	Texas	Reach 11 Sports Complex	Phoenix, Arizona	
2018	UCLA, Utah Valley (Note: Due to rain canceling the finals, both finalists named co-champions)			Foley Sports Tourism Complex	Foley, Alabama	
2019	Purdue	2–0	UCLA	Round Rock Multipurpose Complex	Round Rock, Texas	
2020	Not held due to the COVID-19 pandemic.				N/A	
2021	Boston College	1–0	Missouri	Foley Sports Tourism Complex	Foley, Alabama	
2022	UCLA (2)	3–0	Miami (OH)	Round Rock Multipurpose Complex	Round Rock, Texas	
2023	Miami (OH)	3–1	Purdue	Round Rock Multipurpose Complex	Round Rock, Texas	
2024	Minnesota	0–0 (a.e.t.) (8–7 p)	UCLA	Round Rock Multipurpose Complex	Round Rock, Texas	
2025	Cal Poly	1–0	San Diego State	Scheels Overland Park Soccer Complex	Overland Park, Kansas	

=== Women's open division ===
Below is a complete list of known finals held:

Key
Match was won during extra time
Match was won on a penalty shoot-out

List of women's open soccer championships
Year	Winner	Score	Runner up	Venue	Location	Ref.
1995	Ohio State	7–0	Kansas	University of Texas	Austin, Texas	
1996	Texas	9–0	Rice	University of Texas	Austin, Texas	
1997	Virginia Tech	3–2	Colorado State "Green"	Georgia Southern	Statesboro, Georgia	
1998	Colorado State "Green"	1–1 (a.e.t.) (p)	Florida State	Georgia Southern	Statesboro, Georgia	
1999	Florida State	2–0	Utah Valley	Georgia Southern	Statesboro, Georgia	
2000	Virginia	1–0	Rice	University of Texas	Austin, Texas	
2001	Colorado "Black"	2–1 (a.e.t.)	Ohio State	University of Alabama	Tuscaloosa, Alabama	
2002	Delaware	2–1 (a.e.t.)	Arizona	Kern County Soccer Complex	Bakersfield, California	
2003	Arizona	2–2 (a.e.t.) (p)	Kansas	University of Alabama	Tuscaloosa, Alabama	
2004	Cancelled due to rain			University of Texas	Austin, Texas	
2005	Virginia (2)	1–0	Virginia Tech	University of Alabama	Tuscaloosa, Alabama	
2006	UC Santa Barbara	3–0	Colorado "Black"	Arizona State University	Tempe, Arizona	
2007	Villanova	3–1	UC-Berkeley	University of West Florida	Pensacola, Florida	
2008	UCLA	2–0	East Carolina	University of Alabama	Tuscaloosa, Alabama	
2009	JMU	2–0	Oregon	Reach 11 Sports Complex	Phoenix, Arizona	
2010	Illinois	1–0	Colorado "Black"	Reach 11 Sports Complex	Phoenix, Arizona	
2011	Missouri	2–0	UC Berkeley	Reach 11 Sports Complex	Phoenix, Arizona	
2012	JMU (2)	0–0 (a.e.t.) (3–1 p)	Illinois	Mike Rose Soccer Complex	Memphis, Tennessee	
2013	Cancelled due to rain			Reach 11 Sports Complex	Phoenix, Arizona	
2014	Michigan	2–0	UCLA	Mike Rose Soccer Complex	Memphis, Tennessee	
2015	UCLA (2)	2–0	JMU	Reach 11 Sports Complex	Phoenix, Arizona	
2016	Virginia Tech (2)	2–1	Oregon	Foley Sports Tourism Complex	Foley, Alabama	
2017	Oregon	2–1	Colorado "Black"	Reach 11 Sports Complex	Phoenix, Arizona	
2018	San Diego State	3–1 (Note: Finals were cancelled due to rain. A continuation was held Feb. 23, 2019 at UC-Irvine's Rec Fields)	USC	Foley Sports Complex → UC-Irvine Rec Fields	Foley, AL → Irvine, CA	
2019	Oregon (2)	2–0	East Carolina	Round Rock Multipurpose Complex	Round Rock, Texas	
2020	Not held due to the COVID-19 pandemic.				N/A	
2021	JMU (3)	3–2 (a.e.t.)	UConn	Foley Sports Tourism Complex	Foley, Alabama	
2022	UCLA (3)	1–0	Kansas	Round Rock Multipurpose Complex	Round Rock, Texas	
2023	San Diego State (2)	2–1 (a.e.t.)	UC-Santa Barbara	Round Rock Multipurpose Complex	Round Rock, Texas	
2024	Colorado "Black" (2)	1–1 (a.e.t.) (4–1 p)	Missouri	Round Rock Multipurpose Complex	Round Rock, Texas	
2025	UCLA (4)	2–0	Purdue	Scheels Overland Park Soccer Complex	Overland Park, Kansas	

== Appearances ==
=== Men's championship ===
Key

- CH National Champion
- RU National Runner-up
- F4 Final Four
- E8 Elite Eight
- 16 Sweet Sixteen (Began in 2003)
- • Group Stage
- C1 Consolation Champion (Began in 2003)
- C2 Consolation Runner-up (Began in 2003)
- C4 Consolation Final Four (Began in 2003)
- C8 Consolation Elite Eight (Began in 2003)
- ~~CH~~ The team won the championship, but the participation was later vacated. These vacated appearances are not included in the total columns.

School	Region	#	16	E8	F4	CG	CH	94	95	96	97	98	99	00	01	02	03	04	05	06	07	08	09	10	11	12	13	14	15	16	17	18	19	21	22	23	24	25
BYU	VI	15	15	15	14	13	12			CH	CH	CH	CH	F4	CH	RU															CH	E8	CH	CH	CH	CH	CH	CH
Weber State	VI	15	14	10	7	4	3						F4	E8	•	CH	E8	16	F4		E8		CH	16	CH	RU	16		F4						16			
Colorado	V	23	14	8	4	2	2		•		•		•	E8			C8	E8	CH	C2		E8	F4	CH	16	16	C8			C2	16	16	16	16	C8	C8	E8	F4
Ohio State	III	17	15	10	8	4	1		F4		•		E8								16	F4	16		C4	16	16	CH		RU	16	F4	RU		E8	F4	RU	
Texas	IV	24	17	10	7	3	1	F4	CH	E8	RU	E8			•	•	16	16	16		16			F4	C1	16	C8	16	C8			16	C8	RU	F4	C2	F4	E8
North Carolina	II	19	16	9	7	2	1			•	F4				E8			F4	C8	16		16	16	16	F4				CH	16	16	RU	F4	F4	E8	C4	16	
Penn State	I	14	11	7	3	2	1				•	•	•	CH	F4				E8	16	16	E8	E8		16	E8	16		RU									
Florida	II	15	9	5	3	2	1					•						C8				E8	RU	E8	16	C2	16	16		C8	F4	CH	16		C4	C4		
Michigan	III	19	16	10	6	1	1						E8		F4	F4	16		16	CH	F4		F4	16	C8		C8		16	16	E8	16	E8	F4		E8	C2	
Texas A&M	IV	23	20	13	3	1	1	E8			E8				E8		E8	CH	F4	16	C1	16	E8	16	E8	E8	16	F4	E8	E8	16		16	E8	16		C4	C1
Michigan State	III	14	14	8	2	1	1										E8	16				16	E8		16	CH	16	F4		16	E8	E8	E8		E8			16
Purdue	III	8	4	2	2	1	1	CH	F4	•	•	•					16		C8															16				
Indiana	III	8	6	5	1	1	1		E8							•				E8	E8	CH			C2											16	E8	
UC-Santa Barbara	VI	12	11	4	1	1	1								•			16	16	E8	CH	E8	16		E8		16				16		16	16				
Virginia	II	11	8	3	1	1	1									•	C2		C4			16	E8	E8				16		CH	16	16						16
Texas Tech	IV	12	8	6	4	4	-	E8				RU	RU	RU						E8	RU			C8								C8	C1	16	16	C8		
Illinois	III	18	15	9	5	2	-					E8		F4	RU	E8	~~CH~~		16	RU	F4		C4			E8	16	16	F4		16	C8			E8	C1	16	16
Colorado State	V	24	16	6	4	2	-			•		E8	F4	•	•	•	F4	RU	16	C4	16	RU	16	C4	C8		16	16	16	16		16	16	C1	16	E8		
Missouri	V	9	9	2	2	2	-												16	16		16	16	RU	RU		16		16							16		
Minnesota	V	19	13	6	3	1	-								•	•	F4	E8		16	16	16	16	C1	F4	C4			C2	16	E8		C2	E8	RU	16		16
Cal Poly	VI	12	12	6	2	1	-																16	E8	E8	F4	16	16	16		RU	16	E8	16			E8	
Virginia Tech	II	13	6	3	2	1	-						•	•					C2	C8						16	C8	E8	C4		C8	F4				RU	16	16
UCLA	VI	7	4	3	2	1	-														E8	C8		C2		C8			16							F4		RU
San Diego State	VI	5	2	2	2	1	-									•	C1				C8							RU		F4								
Vanderbilt	II	4	4	3	1	1	-									E8		E8	RU		16																	
UC-Berkeley	VI	5	3	2	1	1	-										16	RU					C8		E8				C1									
Kansas State	V	4	3	2	1	1	-		RU		E8										C8						16											
Utah Valley State	VI	4	3	2	1	1	-					E8					RU	C4	16																			
Baylor	IV	3	1	1	1	1	-			RU		•										C2																
Washington State	VI	1	1	1	1	1	-	RU																														
Arizona	VI	12	7	5	2	-	-						E8	•		E8	16	C4		F4	E8	C1		F4	16	C8						C4						
Salt Lake CC	VI	5	5	4	2	-	-		E8	F4	E8	F4								16																		
Delaware	I	16	4	3	2	-	-									F4	C4	C8	C1				C8	C4	C8		C8	C2	16	E8		C2	F4		C8		C8	C8
Wisconsin	III	9	8	4	1	-	-																						16	E8	F4	E8	16	16	16	C8		E8
Oregon	VI	10	7	4	1	-	-		E8	F4	E8									16		C8										E8		C2		16	16	C8
Cincinnati	III	7	5	3	1	-	-																	16			16	E8	C8	F4		C2		E8				
Georgia Tech	II	6	4	3	1	-	-							•				16												C1						E8	F4	E8
UC-Davis	VI	4	4	2	1	-	-																				16					16		E8	F4			
USC	VI	4	3	2	1	-	-															F4				16							E8		C2			
UC-San Diego	VI	4	2	2	1	-	-												E8	F4											C1						C8	
Boston College	I	3	2	1	1	-	-														16										C8							F4
JMU	II	4	1	1	1	-	-			•	F4																							C8	C4			
Oklahoma	IV	2	1	1	1	-	-	F4										C8																				
Georgia Southern	II	1	1	1	1	-	-					F4																										
Wash U	IV	1	1	1	1	-	-																			F4												
Miami (OH)	III	6	4	3	-	-	-			E8	•		E8		E8			C8																			16	
Ohio	III	2	2	2	-	-	-							E8						E8																		
UCF	II	6	5	1	-	-	-																	16					E8	C4				16			16	16
Cornell	I	9	4	1	-	-	-							•	•	E8	C8	16	C8	C8									16							16		
UConn	I	7	4	1	-	-	-																		16			E8		C8	C4			C4	16	16		
Florida State	II	3	3	1	-	-	-																					16	E8				16					
Kansas	IV	6	2	1	-	-	-			E8				•		•	C8	16													C8							
Auburn	II	5	2	1	-	-	-										E8			C4	C8					C8												16
Mississippi State	II	4	2	1	-	-	-						•		E8		16			C8																		
Rutgers	I	4	2	1	-	-	-																												C8	E8	C1	16
UW-Milwaukee	III	3	2	1	-	-	-														16	E8	C1															
Northwestern	III	2	2	1	-	-	-																	E8	16													
SMU	IV	2	2	1	-	-	-													16								E8										
Stanford	VI	2	2	1	-	-	-																							E8	16							
Penn	I	6	1	1	-	-	-											E8	C8		C2	C8		C8							C8							
Tufts	I	5	1	1	-	-	-																					C8		C8			C4	C8			E8	
UTEP	IV	4	1	1	-	-	-												C4								C8	C4	E8									
Arkansas	IV	2	1	1	-	-	-																										C8					E8
Dayton	III	2	1	1	-	-	-											C4	E8																			
North Texas	IV	2	1	1	-	-	-												E8											C4								
Northern Colorado	V	2	1	1	-	-	-			E8		•																										
Arapahoe CC	V	1	1	1	-	-	-	E8																														
Harvard	I	1	1	1	-	-	-																			E8												
NC State	II	1	1	1	-	-	-																								E8							
Utah	VI	1	1	1	-	-	-							E8																								
Xavier	III	1	1	1	-	-	-		E8																													
Georgia	II	8	3	-	-	-	-				•	•	•								C4		16		C8	16	16											
Navy	I	9	2	-	-	-	-						•	•	•		C4	16			C4		C2	16	C4													
Colorado Mines	V	8	2	-	-	-	-																	C8		16	C8	C1	C8	16	C4		C8					
Texas State	IV	5	2	-	-	-	-					•	•									16	C8		16													
Arizona State	VI	4	2	-	-	-	-										16						C4													16		C4
Georgetown	I	3	2	-	-	-	-																												16	16		C8
Utah State	VI	2	2	-	-	-	-																					16		16								
Clemson	II	5	1	-	-	-	-			•		•			•		16																		C8			
Rice	IV	3	1	-	-	-	-									•											16	C4										
Northern Iowa	V	2	1	-	-	-	-												16	C8																		
Notre Dame	III	2	1	-	-	-	-																											C4	16			
Western Michigan	III	2	1	-	-	-	-											C4						16														
Boston University	I	1	1	-	-	-	-																														16	
Drexel	I	1	1	-	-	-	-																										16					
Fordham	I	1	1	-	-	-	-																									16						
Grand Canyon	VI	1	1	-	-	-	-																														16	
Long Beach State	VI	1	1	-	-	-	-																							16								
Syracuse	I	1	1	-	-	-	-																											16				
TCU	IV	1	1	-	-	-	-																			16												
Grand Valley State	III	3	-	-	-	-	-		•	•																C1												
Iowa State	V	3	-	-	-	-	-																					C8	C8				C4					
Saint Louis	IV	3	-	-	-	-	-																							C8							C4	C8
Denver	V	2	-	-	-	-	-																			C4								C8				
Johns Hopkins	I	2	-	-	-	-	-															C4	C8															
LSU	IV	2	-	-	-	-	-						•													C8												
Maryland	I	2	-	-	-	-	-			•	•																											
Northeastern	I	2	-	-	-	-	-																				C8									C8		
Tulane	IV	2	-	-	-	-	-		•	•																												
UMass	I	2	-	-	-	-	-																	C8				C8										
Alabama	II	1	-	-	-	-	-							•																								
App State	II	1	-	-	-	-	-																											C8				
Augustana	III	1	-	-	-	-	-														C8																	
Brown	I	1	-	-	-	-	-													C1																		
Loyola Chicago	III	1	-	-	-	-	-																						C4									
Marquette	III	1	-	-	-	-	-																					C8										
Nebraska	IV	1	-	-	-	-	-																														C8	
New Hampshire	I	1	-	-	-	-	-																															C2
North Dakota State	V	1	-	-	-	-	-															C8																
Oklahoma State	IV	1	-	-	-	-	-										C8																					
Pittsburgh	I	1	-	-	-	-	-																									C8						
San Jose State	VI	1	-	-	-	-	-																									C4						
SIUE	III	1	-	-	-	-	-																								C2							
Texas Southmost	IV	1	-	-	-	-	-																										C8					
Texas-Rio Grande	IV	1	-	-	-	-	-																									C8						
Tulsa	IV	1	-	-	-	-	-																														C8	
UW-Eau Claire	III	1	-	-	-	-	-															C4																
Washington	VI	1	-	-	-	-	-																															C4
Wichita State	IV	1	-	-	-	-	-		•																													
William & Mary	II	1	-	-	-	-	-																												C2			
Wyoming	V	1	-	-	-	-	-				•																											

=== Women's championship ===
Key

- CH National Champion
- RU National Runner-up
- F4 Final Four
- E8 Elite Eight
- 16 Sweet Sixteen (Began in 2009)
- • Group Stage
- C1 Consolation Champion (Began in 2009)
- C2 Consolation Runner-up (Began in 2009)
- C4 Consolation Final Four (Began in 2009)
- C8 Consolation Elite Eight (Began in 2009)

School	Region	#	16	E8	F4	CG	CH	94	95	96	97	98	99	00	01	02	03	04	05	06	07	08	09	10	11	12	13	14	15	16	17	18	19	21	22	23	24	25
UC-Santa Barbara	VI	22	21	16	13	10	8							•	RU	E8	F4	CH	E8		CH	CH	CH	CH	CH	RU	16	F4	16	CH	CH	16	E8	F4	16		16	
Colorado	V	30	28	24	10	6	4		CH	E8	E8	CH	F4	E8	E8	RU	CH	CH	F4	RU	E8	E8	16	E8	16	E8	C8	E8	C1	16	F4	E8	F4	E8	E8	16	E8	E8
Michigan	III	23	19	15	8	5	4						RU	CH	F4	CH	•	CH	CH	•	E8	E8	E8	C2	16	C8	16		F4		E8	16	E8		E8	16	F4	E8
Colorado State	V	27	19	14	6	5	3				CH	E8	CH	E8	E8	•	F4	CH	RU	E8	•	•	C8	C4	C8	16	16	16	RU	E8	16	E8	E8	16	C4	E8	C8	
Ohio State	III	23	18	13	7	4	3	•		•	E8	E8	F4	RU		•	•						E8	16	C1	E8	16	CH	16	F4	E8	CH	CH	E8	F4	16		16
Michigan State	III	17	14	12	6	3	3								E8	•		•		F4	F4	•	E8		E8	CH		16	CH	F4		E8			E8	E8	16	CH
Penn State	I	24	19	17	11	5	2		F4	E8	RU	RU	E8	F4	CH	•	E8	•	E8	•	F4	F4	RU	F4	E8		16	C2	16	E8	F4			CH	C8			
Miami (OH)	III	16	10	8	6	5	2	CH	RU	CH	•	•	•	E8	•	F4	RU	•								C2	16	RU	E8	16								
Cal Poly	VI	12	11	8	5	3	2																16		RU	16	16		E8	C1	E8		E8	F4	CH	F4	CH	
San Diego State	VI	11	7	7	4	3	1			•			E8		•	F4	E8			CH	RU	E8			C4	C4												RU
UCLA	VI	10	8	5	4	2	1												•		•		F4	E8	16		16						F4	16		CH	RU	
Texas	IV	24	14	8	6	2	-	•	•		•	•				•	•		F4	E8	•		16	RU	F4	F4	16	F4	C2	16	RU	16	16		16	C4	C8	E8
North Carolina	II	20	16	7	4	2	-				F4	F4	E8							•	•	•		16	16	E8	16	E8	16	RU	16	16	C2	RU		16	16	16
Boston College	I	8	4	2	2	2	-													•		•				16							RU	16	C2	RU	C2	
Arizona	VI	9	6	5	2	1	-								F4				E8	E8		RU	E8	16	C2				C8	C8								
Purdue	III	11	5	5	2	1	-	F4	E8	RU	E8		•				E8		•					C8										C4		C2	C4	
Florida	II	17	11	8	1	1	-	RU						•		E8	•	E8	E8			•	C2	E8	16		16	C1	E8	C2	16			E8		E8		
UConn	I	4	3	2	1	1	-																							E8		16	C8		RU			
UC-Davis	VI	6	4	1	1	1	-													•								16			C8	RU		16	16			
Virginia Tech	II	18	10	6	3	-	-					E8	•	F4	•	E8				•	E8	•	16	C8	F4	C8	C8		F4		16		16		16			C1
JMU	II	11	7	6	3	-	-			F4	F4	F4	E8		•	E8	•	E8	•		•												16					
Illinois	III	17	10	4	3	-	-		F4	F4		•	•		•				•		•		16				16	E8	16	16		F4	16	C8		C1		16
Virginia	II	14	7	4	2	-	-										E8	•		F4			16	16	C8	F4		16		C8		C1		C4	C1	E8	C8	
Tennessee	II	3	2	2	2	-	-	F4		•																												F4
Texas A&M	IV	23	11	5	1	-	-				•	E8	•		•	•	•	•	•	E8	•		16	F4		16	16	16	16	E8	C4	C4		16	C8		E8	C4
Cornell	I	12	4	2	1	-	-													•	•	•	C8	16	E8	C8		C8	C8				C4			16		F4
Clemson	II	6	3	2	1	-	-			E8	•	•															C8					F4	16					
Oregon	VI	3	3	1	1	-	-																					16							F4		16	
Georgia	II	4	2	1	1	-	-								•											16					C2						F4	
Texas State	IV	4	2	1	1	-	-					•											F4	16														C8
Vanderbilt	II	3	2	1	1	-	-																												16	F4		C8
Dayton	III	5	1	1	1	-	-				•								•	•		F4					C8											
Delaware	I	15	9	6	-	-	-						•	E8	E8			E8	•		E8		C4	C8	C4	16	16	E8	E8	C4	16							
Wisconsin	III	7	5	3	-	-	-																							16	E8	E8	C4	E8	16			C2
Pitt	I	6	5	3	-	-	-																	E8	E8	E8	16	C8	16									
Baylor	IV	11	3	2	-	-	-		E8					•	•		•	•				E8		C4		16	C8							C8	C8			
Kansas	IV	12	7	1	-	-	-			•	•	•														16		16	16	16		C1	16	16		C4	E8	
UC-Berkeley	VI	4	2	1	-	-	-											E8						C8		C1						16						
Missouri	IV	3	2	1	-	-	-																C1				16											E8
Salt Lake CC	VI	5	1	1	-	-	-			•	E8	•	•														C8											
Arizona State	VI	3	1	1	-	-	-																	C1												C8	E8	
Ohio	III	2	1	1	-	-	-		E8																						C1							
Bowling Green	III	1	1	1	-	-	-			E8																												
Cincinnati	III	1	1	1	-	-	-																												E8			
Tulane	IV	1	1	1	-	-	-		E8																													
Minnesota	V	5	4	-	-	-	-																										C8	16	16	16	16	
Wash U	IV	7	3	-	-	-	-																		16				C8		C4	C8			16		C8	16
Gonzaga	VI	4	3	-	-	-	-																							16	16	16	C1					
Northeastern	I	4	3	-	-	-	-																								16	C8				16	16	
Marquette	III	3	3	-	-	-	-																16	16	16													
Colorado Mines	V	6	2	-	-	-	-																C4		C8			16	C4	16	C8							
Auburn	II	2	2	-	-	-	-																														16	16
College of New Jersey	I	5	1	-	-	-	-																C8	16		C8						C8	C8					
Maryland	I	4	1	-	-	-	-				•					•	•																					16
USC	VI	3	1	-	-	-	-																				C8	C4					16					
Georgia Tech	II	2	1	-	-	-	-																											16	C8			
Syracuse	I	2	1	-	-	-	-																							C4								16
TCU	IV	2	1	-	-	-	-																		16											C8		
Brown	I	1	1	-	-	-	-																															16
Fordham	I	1	1	-	-	-	-																									16						
Grand Valley State	III	1	1	-	-	-	-																										16					
LSU	IV	1	1	-	-	-	-																														16	
South Carolina	II	1	1	-	-	-	-																													16		
Vermont	I	1	1	-	-	-	-																								16							
Florida State	II	4	-	-	-	-	-							•														C4		C8					C4			
Indiana	III	4	-	-	-	-	-							•				•							C8	C4												
Boise State	VI	2	-	-	-	-	-																													C8		C8
Harvard	I	2	-	-	-	-	-																											C8			C1	
Iowa	V	2	-	-	-	-	-		•	•																												
Iowa State	V	2	-	-	-	-	-																									C4				C8		
NC State	II	2	-	-	-	-	-																					C8				C8						
Princeton	I	2	-	-	-	-	-									•		•																				
Rice	IV	2	-	-	-	-	-						•																				C8					
Air Force	V	1	-	-	-	-	-																				C8											
Arkansas	IV	1	-	-	-	-	-																											C8				
Cal State Northridge	VI	1	-	-	-	-	-																					C8										
Denver	V	1	-	-	-	-	-																C8															
Grand Canyon	V	1	-	-	-	-	-																															C8
Ithaca	I	1	-	-	-	-	-																								C8							
Kansas State	IV	1	-	-	-	-	-			•																												
Long Beach State	VI	1	-	-	-	-	-																						C8									
Miami (FL)	II	1	-	-	-	-	-		•																													
North Florida	II	1	-	-	-	-	-		•																													
Northern Arizona	VI	1	-	-	-	-	-																						C4									
Northern Colorado	V	1	-	-	-	-	-							•																								
Rutgers	I	1	-	-	-	-	-												•																			
Salisbury State	I	1	-	-	-	-	-					•																										
SMU	IV	1	-	-	-	-	-																								C8							
Southern Mississippi	II	1	-	-	-	-	-			•																												
Texas Tech	IV	1	-	-	-	-	-							•																								
UC-San Diego	VI	1	-	-	-	-	-																							C8								
UMass	I	1	-	-	-	-	-																														C4	
Utah	VI	1	-	-	-	-	-																															C4
Utah Valley State	VI	1	-	-	-	-	-							•																								
UTSA	IV	1	-	-	-	-	-															•																
Villanova	I	1	-	-	-	-	-																											C2				
Washington	VI	1	-	-	-	-	-																											C1				
West Virginia	I	1	-	-	-	-	-				•																											
Wichita State	IV	1	-	-	-	-	-	•																														
