= BYU Cougars men's soccer =

BYU Cougars men’s soccer
- Full name: Brigham Young University Cougars
- Nickname: Cougars
- Founded: 1963; 63 years ago
- Stadium: The Stadium at South Field; Provo, Utah
- Capacity: 4,200
- Head Coach: Brandon Gilliam
- Website: https://soccer.byu.edu/
Home colors	Away colors

BYU Cougars men's soccer is an American soccer team based in Provo, Utah, United States. The club has won eleven NIRSA national championships, and it is the only university sponsored soccer program to have ever purchased a franchise, competing in the Premier Development League (now known as USL League Two) from 2003 to 2017. It has since returned to club competition with NIRSA, and the team plays its home games at The Stadium at South Field on the campus of Brigham Young University. The team's colors are dark blue and white.

== History ==
Men's soccer has had a presence at BYU dating back to 1955, when Carl and Harold Boden – two brothers who had recently moved from Germany to attend the school – placed an ad in the student newspaper and gathered enough players together to start a team. They joined the Utah Soccer League the following year, and began playing teams from around the state of the Utah. The university officially sanctioned soccer as a club sport in 1963.

The team received a major boost in 1969 with the arrival of former Italian soccer star Bruno Gerzeli, who had 14 seasons of experience as a professional player in Europe and South America. Gerzeli had become a member of the Church of Jesus Christ of Latter-day Saints in 1966 while living in Canada, and moved to Utah shortly thereafter. His coaching helped BYU secure the Daynes Cup, the top soccer trophy in the state, in 1970. He also provided some international exposure by arranging for the team to take a 22-day tour of his native Italy in 1974. That same year BYU installed new coach Shavji “Jim” Dusara, who had previously served as head coach of the national soccer team of Tanzania during Olympic qualifying in 1968 and 1972. Dusara continued the trend of building BYU soccer with players from foreign countries, in addition to local talent from Utah and other parts of the United States. The team won the Daynes Cup for the second time in 1976.

The BYU men's soccer team officially joined the NCAA in 1978. Then known as the “SoccerCats”, the team showed well in their first season, defeating rival Utah 3-0 and eventually finishing in second place in the WAC tournament. The program then proceeded to win the tournament in the following three consecutive seasons (1979 to 1981). Dusara guided the team as head coach until 1987, when he was controversially dismissed by BYU's athletic administration, and the men's soccer program was dropped from NCAA status.

With the end of NCAA competition, BYU's men's soccer team found significant success at the club level. The Cougars won NCSA national titles in 1993 and 1995 prior to moving to NIRSA. There, they continued to dominate the Collegiate Club Soccer Championships, winning national titles in 1996, 1997, 1998, 1999, and 2001, including an unprecedented run of 30 straight victories at the Club National Championships.

In 2001, BYU participated in its first international tour as a club team. The Cougars traveled for 10 days throughout Europe, playing 6 games in Spain and the Netherlands. BYU compiled a 4-1-1 record, with games in Spain against Vallecas CF, Rayo Vallecano reserves, and FC Barcelona reserves, and in the Netherlands against FC Sittard and Minor Nuth. In 2002, they spent 6 days in Pachuca and Mexico City playing 4 games against the various reserve teams of C.F. Pachuca and Cruz Azul, compiling a 2–2 record.

Paralleling their efforts to increase the level of competition, BYU left the collegiate club division of soccer, and purchased a franchise in the Premier Development League (now known as USL League Two), where they began play in May 2003. Part of the United Soccer Leagues system, the league provided year-round competition and cost $40,000 to enter. BYU became the only university-sponsored soccer program to purchase a franchise and compete at a level considered higher than NCAA soccer in the pyramid of U.S. soccer development. Their first season in the PDL saw BYU in the Southwest Division, competing against traditionally strong southern California sides such as Orange County Blue Star and Southern California Seahorses. The team won 3–0 over the Nevada Wonders in their first game, but finished their first season with a 2–13–1 record.

BYU finished 4th in their second and third PDL seasons. In 2006, BYU was realigned to the Northwest Division, and qualified for their first U.S. Open Cup and their first playoffs. In 2007, the Cougars won their first divisional title, but the following year the team fell back to 4th place. BYU realigned to the PDL's Southwest Division in 2009 following the league's expansion in the Pacific Northwest, and they finished fourth in the table, three points out of the playoffs. BYU's tough time in the Southwest continued in 2010, a season in which the Cougars won just four games.

In 2017, it was announced that the team would leave the PDL after 15 seasons to return to club status, and the club finished the season with its sixth NIRSA National Championship. The following year, the team would have their worst NIRSA National Tournament performance after losing to eventual national champions Florida 1–0 in the quarterfinals of the 2018 tournament.

On November 23, 2019, the Cougars faced the 2014 National Champions Ohio State in the 2019 NIRSA National Championship. Ohio State and BYU whom are perennial power houses entered the match with a 18-1-0 record and a 16-1-0 record respectively. The Buckeyes took a 1–0 lead in the 8th minute, but the Cougars responded shortly after with a penalty kick in the 14th minute. The Cougars then made it 2–1 in the 24th minute of the match. In the 28th minute the Buckeyes were reduced to 10 men following a red card. The Cougars entered half-time with the 2–1 advantage. Although the Buckeyes were down a player, they kept the pressure on BYU for majority of the 2nd half. The Cougars defense made spectacular efforts to keep the game only 2–1, after weathering numerous set pieces from the Buckeyes. As the Buckeyes continued to push more numbers forward in search for an equalizer, BYU sealed the game in the 80th minute off a counterattack to make the game 3–1, and ultimately giving BYU their 7th National Championship.

Following the 2020 season that was cancelled due to the COVID-19 pandemic, BYU would go on to win the following five consecutive tournaments, extending their national championship total to 12 and winning a historic six-straight titles, winning every game in that streak except a 0–0 draw against Notre Dame in their 2021 tournament opener and a 1–1 draw against Colorado in the 2025 tournament group stage finale.

== Honors ==
=== NIRSA ===
- 1996 National Champions
- 1997 National Champions
- 1998 National Champions
- 1999 National Champions
- 2001 National Champions
- 2002 National Runners-up
- 2017 National Champions
- 2019 National Champions
- 2021 National Champions
- 2022 National Champions
- 2023 National Champions
- 2024 National Champions
- 2025 National Champions

=== United Soccer League ===
- 2007 PDL Northwest Division Champions

== Attendances ==
Attendance stats are calculated by averaging each team's self-reported home attendances and from Kenn.com https://kenn.com/blog/soccer/all-time-usl-league-two-attendance/

- 2003: 630 (14th in PDL)
- 2004: 605 (12th in PDL)
- 2005: 378 (22nd in PDL)
- 2006: 414 (19th in PDL) Playoffs: 500 Overall: 431
- 2007: 525 (20th in PDL)
- 2008: 454 (22nd in PDL)
- 2009: 782 (15th in PDL)
- 2010: 712 (17th in PDL)
- 2011: 568 (19th in PDL)
- 2012: 879 (10th in PDL)
- 2013: 1,136 (10th in PDL)
- 2014: 1,888 (4th in PDL)
- 2015: 800 (8th in PDL)
- 2016: NA
- 2017: NA

== Head coaches ==
- (Italy) Bruno Gerzeli (1968–1974)
- (South Africa) Jim Dusara (1974–1987)
- (United States) David G. Woolley (1987–1995)
- (United States) Chris Watkins (1995–2015)
- (United States) Brandon Gilliam (2015–present)

== Stadium ==
- The Stadium at South Field; Provo, Utah (1995–present) (40.247°N 111.655°W)
