= 1995 NIRSA National Soccer Championship =

- League: NIRSA
- Sport: Soccer
- Site: University of Texas; Austin, Texas
- Duration: November 16–18, 1995
- Teams: 12 (men's championship); 12 (women's championship); 6 (men's open); 6 (women's open)

Men's Championship Division
- Score: 5–0
- Champion: Texas (1st title, 1st title game)
- Runners-up: Kansas State (1st title game)
- Season MVP: Peter Narvarte (Texas)

Women's Championship Division
- Champion: Colorado (1st title, 1st title game)
- Runners-up: Miami (OH) (2nd title game)
- Season MVP: Brittan Hlista (Colorado)

Men's Open Division
- Score: 1–1 (a.e.t.); 4–3 (pen.)
- Champion: ~~Rice~~ (Note: Due to an ineligible player, Rice would vacate the title. The title would be given to runners-up Texas "B" and since they lost to Rice in the semifinals, Texas Tech would be named runners-up); Texas "B" (1st title, 1st title game)
- Runners-up: Texas Tech (1st title game)
- Season MVP: Ben Heilman (Texas)

Women's Open Division
- Champion: Ohio State (1st title, 1st title game)
- Runners-up: Kansas (1st title game)
- Top seed: Kristi Malen (Ohio State)

NIRSA national soccer championships seasons
- ← 1994 1996 →

The 1995 NIRSA national soccer championship was the 2nd NIRSA National Soccer Championships, the annual national championships for United States-based, collegiate club soccer teams organized by NIRSA. It took place at The University of Texas at Austin from Thursday, November 16 to Saturday, November 18, 1995. Notably, this is the first tournament that added the open division for the men and women.

== Overview ==
=== Men's championship ===
In the finals, hosts Texas would face Kansas State. Prior to this, in the group stage, both teams would win all three of their games. Texas would defeat Ohio State 5-0 in their opener, then Grand Valley State 7-0, and finally Colorado 2-0 while Kansas State defeated Tulane via forfeit, then reigning champions Purdue 4-1, and finally Xavier 5-2.

In the knockout round, Texas would concede their first goal of the tournament in a 8–1 win over Xavier while Kansas State would remain tied 1–1 with Oregon after regulation and overtime, meaning a penalty shootout was required. Kansas State would win the shootout 5–3 and advance to the semifinals to face Ohio State. In the semifinals, Texas would defeat reigning champions, Purdue, 2–0 while Kansas State would once again require overtime after a 0–0 draw with Ohio State. In overtime, Kansas State would score and advance to the finals against hosts Texas. In the finals, Texas would defeat Kansas State 5–0 and claim their first national title. Texas' Peter Narvarte would be named the tournament's MVP.

=== Women's championship ===
In the finals, Colorado would face the reigning champions Miami (OH) in a rematch of their second group stage game. In the group stage opener, Miami (OH) would defeat hosts, Texas, 4-1 while Colorado defeated Iowa 7-0. In the second group stage match, the teams would remain tied 1-1 after regulation, but Miami (OH) would claim the victory with a goal in overtime. In the group stage finale, Miami (OH) defeated Iowa 2-0 while Colorado defeated hosts, Texas, 3-1, sending both teams to the knockout round.

In the knockout round, Miami (OH) would defeat reigning semifinalists, Purdue, 4-3 while Colorado defeated Baylor 5-0. In the semifinals, Colorado would defeat Penn State 2-0 while Miami (OH) defeated Illinois 3-2, meaning they were the only reigning champion to reach the finals with Purdue's men's team losing to Texas in the semifinals of the men's championship division. In the finals, despite the first match being close enough to require overtime, Colorado would defeat Miami (OH) handily 4-0 and claim their first national title. Former Texas A&M varsity player, Brittan Hlista of Colorado, would be named the MVP.

=== Men's open ===
In the inaugural open tournament, in-state rivals Rice and hosts Texas' "B" team would face off in a rematch of both teams' group stage finale. In the seeding matches, Texas "B" would win their opener 7-1 over TAMU-Galveston and their second match 6-0 over Kirkwood CC. Meanwhile, Rice would lose their opener to Sam Houston State 0-5 then lost 1-4 to Texas Tech. In the group stage finale for both teams, Texas "B" would defeat Rice 4-0 giving Texas "B" the number 1 overall seed and an automatic bye to the semifinals while Rice had the sixth, and worst, seed and would have to face Sam Houston State again in the opening round. In the opening round, Kirkwood CC would defeat TAMU-Galveston 5-2 and advance to the semifinals to play Texas "B" while Rice would defeat in-city rival and 3 seed, Sam Houston State, 4–0 and would now face another in-state rival in Texas Tech. In the semifinals, Texas "B" would defeat Kirkwood Community College 5-0 while Rice would tie Texas Tech 1–1 after regulation meaning overtime would be required. Rice's midfielder Mike Eggen, who scored Rice's first goal, would score in overtime to improbably send his team to the finals. In the finals, Rice's Mike Eggen would open the scoring but Texas "B" would tie the game up shortly after that. The game would remain tied 1–1 through regulation and overtime meaning a penalty shootout would determine the champion. Rice would make four of their five kicks and would defeat Texas "B".

However, shortly after this, tournament officials determined Rice used an ineligible player following the opening round match against Sam Houston State and vacated their title. Rather than leaving the first title without a champion, initial runners-up Texas "B" would be given the title and since they lost to Rice in the semifinals, initial semifinalist Texas Tech would be judged as the runners-up with Kirkland CC being judged as a "finalist". To date, this is the only time an open division team has been judged to have used ineligible players and the only time when a forfeited title was given to another team (the only other instance of this was in 2006 where Illinois men vacated their title but the championship was left without a champion rather than awarding it to the finalists, Utah Valley State).

=== Women's open ===
In the inaugural women's open finals, Ohio State would face Kansas in a rematch of their group stage finale. Prior to this, in the group stage, Ohio State won their opener 7-0 over Sam Houston State then beat Colorado State 3-0 while Kansas would lose their opener 0-1 to Grand Valley State but would beat Texas Tech 4-1 in the following match. In the group stage finale, Ohio State would defeat Kansas 3-0 giving Kansas the 4-seed to face 5-seed Texas Tech in the opener while Ohio State received the number two overall seed and automatically advanced to the semifinals.

In the opening round, both games would result in a forfeit with Sam Houston State forfeiting to Colorado State who would advance to the semifinals to face Ohio State and with Texas Tech forfeiting to Kansas, advancing them to the semifinals to face Grand Valley State. In the semifinals, Ohio State would defeat Colorado State 5-0 while Kansas defeated Grand Valley State 2–1 despite previously losing to them. In the finals, Ohio State would claim the first women's open title after defeating Kansas 7-0. Ohio State's Kristi Malen would be named MVP.

== Qualification and selections ==
=== Men's championship ===
Region	Team	Appearance	Last Bid
III	Purdue	2nd	1994
III	Ohio State	1st	Never
III	Grand Valley State	1st	Never
III	Indiana	1st	Never
III	Xavier	1st	Never
IV	Texas	2nd	1994
IV	Kansas State	1st	Never
IV	Tulane	1st	Never
IV	Wichita State	1st	Never
V	Colorado	1st	Never
VI	Salt Lake CC	1st	Never
VI	Oregon	1st	Never

=== Women's championship ===
Region	Team	Appearance	Last Bid
I	Penn State	1st	Never
II	Miami (FL)	1st	Never
II	North Florida	1st	Never
III	Miami (OH)	2nd	1994
III	Purdue	2nd	1994
III	Illinois	1st	Never
III	Ohio University	1st	Never
IV	Texas	1st	Never
IV	Baylor	1st	Never
IV	Tulane	1st	Never
V	Iowa	1st	Never
V	Colorado	1st	Never

=== Men's open ===
Region	Num	Team
I	0	-
II	0	-
III	0	-
IV	5	Texas "B", Rice, Texas Tech, Texas A&M-Galveston, Sam Houston State
V	1	Kirkwood CC
VI	0	-

=== Women's open ===
Region	Num	Team
I	0	–
II	0	–
III	2	Ohio State, Grand Valley
IV	2	Texas Tech, Sam Houston State
V	2	Kansas, Colorado State
VI	0	–

== Group stage ==
=== Men's championship ===
Group A
Pos	Team	Pld	W	L	GF	GA	GD	SO (Note: Shutouts)	GFP (Note: Goals for, points. The points gained by scoring with a max of 3 per game)	Pts	Qualification
1	Texas	3	3	0	14	0	+14	3	8	29	Advanced to knockout stage
2	Ohio State	3	2	1	3	6	-3	1	3	16	Advanced to knockout stage
3	Colorado	3	1	2	2	3	-1	1	2	9	
4	Grand Valley State	3	0	3	1	11	-10	0	1	1	

Scores

Thu, November 16	Colorado	2-0	Grand Valley	University of Texas; Austin, Texas
		Report		Stadium: Whitaker Fields

Thu, November 16	Texas	5–0	Ohio State	University of Texas; Austin, Texas
		Report		Stadium: Whitaker Fields

Thu, November 16	Colorado	0-1	Ohio State	University of Texas; Austin, Texas
				Stadium: Whitaker Fields

Thu, November 16	Grand Valley	0–7	Texas	University of Texas; Austin, Texas
		Report		Stadium: Whitaker Fields

Fri, November 17	Texas	2–0	Colorado	University of Texas; Austin, Texas
		Report		Stadium: Whitaker Fields

Fri, November 17	Ohio State	2-1	Grand Valley	University of Texas; Austin, Texas
		Report	Chris Wilson	Stadium: Whitaker Fields

Group B
Pos	Team	Pld	W	L	GF	GA	GD	SO	GFP	Pts	Qualification
1	Salt Lake CC	3	3	0	14	1	+13	2	8	28	Advanced to knockout stage
2	Indiana	3	2	1	8	9	-1	0	6	18	Advanced to knockout stage
3	Oregon	3	1	2	8	6	+2	0	6	12	Advanced to knockout stage
4	Wichita State	3	0	3	3	17	-14	0	3	3	

Scores

Thu, November 16	Wichita State	1–5	Oregon	University of Texas; Austin, Texas

Thu, November 16	Salt Lake CC	5–0	Indiana	University of Texas; Austin, Texas
		Report

Thu, November 16	Wichita State	2–5	Indiana	University of Texas; Austin, Texas

Thu, November 16	Oregon	1–2	Salt Lake CC	University of Texas; Austin, Texas
		Report

Fri, November 17	Salt Lake CC	7–0	Wichita State	University of Texas; Austin, Texas
		Report

Fri, November 17	Indiana	3–2	Oregon	University of Texas; Austin, Texas

Group C
Pos	Team	Pld	W	L	GF	GA	GD	SO	GFP	Pts	Qualification
1	Kansas State	3	3	0	10	3	+7	1	7	26	Advanced to knockout stage
2	Purdue	3	2	1	4	5	-1	1	4	17	Advanced to knockout stage
3	Xavier	3	1	2	4	7	-3	1	4	11	Advanced to knockout stage
4	Tulane (Note: Tulane forfeited all 3 games)	3	0	3	0	3	-3	0	0	0	

Scores

Thu, November 16	Purdue	2–1	Xavier	University of Texas; Austin, Texas

Thu, November 16	Tulane	0–1; Forfeit	Kansas State	University of Texas; Austin, Texas
		Report

Thu, November 16	Purdue	1–4	Kansas State	University of Texas; Austin, Texas
		Report

Thu, November 16	Xavier	1–0; Forfeit	Tulane	University of Texas; Austin, Texas

Fri, November 17	Tulane	0–1; Forfeit	Purdue	University of Texas; Austin, Texas

Fri, November 17	Kansas State	5–2	Xavier	University of Texas; Austin, Texas
		Report

=== Women's championship ===
Pos	Team	Pld	W	L	GF	GA	GD	SO	GFP	Pts	Qualification
1	Penn State	3	3	0	8	2	+6	2	8	26	Advanced to knockout stage
2	Tulane	3	1	2	4	4	0	1	4	11	Advanced to knockout stage
3	Purdue	3	1	2	4	4	0	1	3	10	Advanced to knockout stage
4	North Florida	3	1	2	1	7	-6	1	1	8	

Scores

Thu, November 16	North Florida	1–0; Forfeit	Tulane	University of Texas; Austin, Texas
				Stadium: Whitaker Fields

Thu, November 16	Purdue	0–2	Penn State	University of Texas; Austin, Texas
				Stadium: Whitaker Fields

Thu, November 16	North Florida	0–3	Penn State	University of Texas; Austin, Texas
				Stadium: Whitaker Fields

Thu, November 16	Tulane	2–0	Purdue	University of Texas; Austin, Texas
				Stadium: Whitaker Fields

Fri, November 17	Purdue	4–0	North Florida	University of Texas; Austin, Texas
				Stadium: Whitaker Fields

Fri, November 17	Penn State	3–2	Tulane	University of Texas; Austin, Texas
				Stadium: Whitaker Fields

Pos	Team	Pld	W	L	GF	GA	GD	SO	GFP	Pts	Qualification
1	Baylor	3	3	0	13	3	+10	1	9	28	Advanced to knockout stage
2	Illinois	3	2	1	9	4	+5	1	6	19	Advanced to knockout stage
3	Ohio	3	1	2	6	4	+2	1	4	11	Advanced to knockout stage
4	Miami (FL)	3	0	3	1	18	-17	0	1	1	

Scores

Thu, November 16	Miami (FL)	1–6	Illinois	University of Texas; Austin, Texas
				Stadium: Whitaker Fields

Thu, November 16	Ohio	1–3	Baylor	University of Texas; Austin, Texas
				Stadium: Whitaker Fields

Thu, November 16	Miami (FL)	0–7	Baylor	University of Texas; Austin, Texas
				Stadium: Whitaker Fields

Thu, November 16	Illinois	1–0	Ohio	University of Texas; Austin, Texas
				Stadium: Whitaker Fields

Fri, November 17	Ohio	5–0	Miami (FL)	University of Texas; Austin, Texas
				Stadium: Whitaker Fields

Fri, November 17	Baylor	3–2 (a.e.t.)	Illinois	University of Texas; Austin, Texas
				Stadium: Whitaker Fields

Pos	Team	Pld	W	L	GF	GA	GD	SO	GFP	Pts	Qualification
1	Miami (OH)	3	3	0	8	2	+6	1	7	26	Advanced to knockout stage
2	Colorado	3	2	1	11	3	+8	1	7	20	Advanced to knockout stage
3	Iowa	3	1	2	2	10	-8	0	2	8	
4	Texas	3	0	3	3	9	-6	0	3	3	

Scores

Thu, November 16	Miami (OH)	4–1	Texas	University of Texas; Austin, Texas
				Stadium: Whitaker Fields

Thu, November 16	Iowa	0–7	Colorado	University of Texas; Austin, Texas
				Stadium: Whitaker Fields

Thu, November 16	Miami (OH)	2–1 (a.e.t.)	Colorado	University of Texas; Austin, Texas
				Stadium: Whitaker Fields

Thu, November 16	Texas	1–2	Iowa	University of Texas; Austin, Texas
				Stadium: Whitaker Fields

Fri, November 17	Iowa	0–2	Miami (OH)	University of Texas; Austin, Texas
				Stadium: Whitaker Fields

Fri, November 17	Colorado	3–1	Texas	University of Texas; Austin, Texas
				Stadium: Whitaker Fields

=== Men's open ===
Group A
Pos	Seed	Team	Pld	W	L	GF	GA	GD	SO	GFP	Pts	Qualification
1	1	Texas "B"	3	3	0	17	1	+16	2	9	29	Advanced to semifinals
2	2	Texas Tech	3	3	0	17	1	+16	2	9	29	Advanced to semifinals
3	6	Rice	3	0	3	1	13	-12	0	1	1	Advanced to first round
Group B
Pos	Seed	Team	Pld	W	L	GF	GA	GD	SO	GFP	Pts	Qualification
1	3	Sam Houston State	3	2	1	9	4	+5	1	6	19	Advanced to first round
2	4	Kirkwood CC	3	1	2	5	20	-15	0	3	9	Advanced to first round
3	5	Texas A&M-Galveston	3	0	3	6	16	-10	0	5	6	Advanced to first round

Scores

Thu, November 16	Kirkwood CC	0–10	Texas Tech	University of Texas; Austin, Texas
				Stadium: Whitaker Fields

Thu, November 16	TAMU-Galveston	1–7	Texas "B"	University of Texas; Austin, Texas
				Stadium: Whitaker Fields

Thu, November 16	Rice	0–5	Sam Houston State	University of Texas; Austin, Texas
				Stadium: Whitaker Fields

Thu, November 16	Texas Tech	4–1	Rice	University of Texas; Austin, Texas
				Stadium: Whitaker Fields

Thu, November 16	TAMU-Galveston	1–4	Sam Houston State	University of Texas; Austin, Texas
				Stadium: Whitaker Fields

Thu, November 16	Texas "B"	6–0	Kirkwood CC	University of Texas; Austin, Texas
				Stadium: Whitaker Fields

Fri, November 17	Rice	0–4	Texas "B"	University of Texas; Austin, Texas
				Stadium: Whitaker Fields

Fri, November 17	TAMU-Galveston	4–5 (a.e.t.); Penalties	Kirkwood CC	University of Texas; Austin, Texas
				Stadium: Whitaker Fields

Fri, November 17	Texas Tech	3–0	Sam Houston State	University of Texas; Austin, Texas
				Stadium: Whitaker Fields

=== Women's open ===
Group A
Pos	Seed	Team	Pld	W	D	L	GF	GA	GD	SO	GFP	Pts	Qualification
1	1	Ohio State	3	3	0	0	13	0	+13	3	9	30	Advanced to semifinals
2	2	Grand Valley State	3	3	0	0	8	0	+8	3	5	26	Advanced to semifinals
3	6	Texas Tech	3	0	0	3	2	8	-6	0	2	2	Advanced to first round
Group B
Pos	Seed	Team	Pld	W	D	L	GF	GA	GD	SO	GFP	Pts	Qualification
1	3	Kansas	3	1	0	2	4	5	-1	0	3	9	Advanced to first round
2	4	Colorado State	3	1	0	2	3	5	-2	0	3	9	Advanced to first round
3	5	Sam Houston State	3	1	0	2	1	13	-12	1	1	8	Advanced to first round

Thu, November 16	Kansas	0–1	Grand Valley	University of Texas; Austin, Texas
		Report		Stadium: Whitaker Fields

Thu, November 16	Colorado State	3-1	Texas Tech	University of Texas; Austin, Texas
				Stadium: Whitaker Fields

Thu, November 16	Sam Houston State	0-7	Ohio State	University of Texas; Austin, Texas
				Stadium: Whitaker Fields

Thu, November 16	Grand Valley	6–0	Sam Houston	University of Texas; Austin, Texas
		Report		Stadium: Whitaker Fields

Thu, November 16	Texas Tech	1-4	Kansas	University of Texas; Austin, Texas
				Stadium: Whitaker Fields

Thu, November 16	Ohio State	3-0	Colorado State	University of Texas; Austin, Texas
				Stadium: Whitaker Fields

Fri, November 17	Kansas	0-3	Ohio State	University of Texas; Austin, Texas
				Stadium: Whitaker Fields

Fri, November 17	Colorado State	0–1	Grand Valley	University of Texas; Austin, Texas
		Report		Stadium: Whitaker Fields

Fri, November 17	Sam Houston State	1–0	Texas Tech	University of Texas; Austin, Texas
				Stadium: Whitaker Fields

== Tournament bracket ==
=== Men's championship ===
Quarterfinals
Fri • Nov. 17
Texas	8
Xavier	1
Fri • Nov. 17
Purdue	1
Salt Lake CC	0
Fri • Nov. 17
Ohio State	3
Indiana	0
Fri • Nov. 17
Oregon	2 (2)
Kansas State (pen.)	2 (4)

Semifinals
Sat • Nov. 18
Texas	2
Purdue	0
Sat • Nov. 18
Ohio State	1
Kansas State (a.e.t.)	0

Final
Sat • Nov. 18
Texas	5
Kansas State	0

=== Women's championship ===
Quarterfinals
Fri • Nov. 17
Ohio	0
Penn State	1
Fri • Nov. 17
Colorado	5
Baylor	0
Fri • Nov. 17
Tulane	1
Illinois	2
Fri • Nov. 17
Purdue	3
Miami (OH)	4

Semifinals
Fri • Nov. 18
Penn State	0
Colorado	2
Fri • Nov. 18
Illinois	2
Miami (OH)	3

Final
Fri • Nov. 18
Colorado	4
Miami (OH)	0

=== Men's open ===
First round
Fri • Nov. 17
4	Kirkwood CC	5
5	TAMU-Galveston	2
Fri • Nov. 17
3	Sam Houston State	0
6	Rice	4

Semifinals
Sat • Nov. 18
Texas "B"	5
4	Kirkwood CC	0
Sat • Nov. 18
Texas Tech	1
6	Rice (a.e.t.)	2

Final
Sat • Nov. 18
1	Texas "B"	1 (3)
6	Rice (pen.)	1 (4)

=== Women's open ===
First round
Fri • Nov. 17
4	Colorado State	1
5	Sam Houston State (forfeit)	0
Fri • Nov. 17
3	Kansas	1
6	Texas Tech (forfeit)	0

Semifinals
Sat • Nov. 18
Ohio State	5
4	Colorado State	0
Sat • Nov. 18
Grand Valley State	1
3	Kansas	2

Final
Sat • Nov. 18
1	Ohio State	7
3	Kansas	0

== All-tournament teams ==
Key
MVP
Best goalkeeper

=== Men's championship ===
Position	Name	Team
Midfielder	Pete Narvarte	Texas
GK	Michael Burgy	Kansas State
Midfielder	Don Robertson	Kansas State
Forward	Jorge Estrada	Salt Lake CC
CAM	Francisco Silva	Salt Lake CC
CDM	Troy Yamaguchi	Texas
Defender	Pat Doyle	Purdue
Midfielder	Brian McQuery	Ohio State
Defender	Mark Hamre	Texas
CDM	Tony Hoang	Purdue
Sweeper	Karlton Dodson	Kansas State

=== Women's championship ===
Position	Name	Team
Midfielder	Brittan Hlista	Colorado
GK	Erica Loechl	Illinois
Forward	Katie Crowley	Miami (OH)
Halfback	Patty McCauley	Miami (OH)
Forward	Delilah Heulsint	Tulane
Forward	Kia Young	Colorado
Centerback	Ariel Falk	Purdue
Defender	Melanie Goss	Baylor
Defender	Allison Goldschlag	Penn State
Defender	Claire Quintella	Colorado
Defender	Missy Papanek	Ohio

=== Men's open ===
Position	Name	Team
Midfielder	Ben Heilman	Texas "B"
GK	Jeff McClure	Texas "B"
Midfielder	Clint Winegar	Texas A&M – Galveston
Midfielder	Travis Miller	Kirkwood CC
Forward	Sam Morton	Sam Houston State
Defender	John Grubbs	Texas Tech
Forward	Greg Clampper	Texas "B"
CAM	Jason Boyle	Kirkwood CC
Sweeper	Jason Hill	Texas "B"
Defender	Brian Devlin	Texas Tech
Sweeper	Rob Draper	Texas Tech

=== Women's open ===
Position	Name	Team
Forward	Kristi Malen	Ohio State
GK	Kim Schaul	Kansas
Midfielder	Katie Powers	Kansas
Forward	Debbie Thompson	Kansas
Midfielder	Melissa Ide	Grand Valley
Strikerr	Kim Cox	Ohio State
Stopper	Brenda Olivas	Colorado State
Sweeper	Kristen Fullford	Kansas
Midfielder	Jill Leonard	Ohio State
Defender	Nikki Vertal	Texas Tech
Striker	Kim Crady	Ohio State
