= 1994 NIRSA National Soccer Championship =

- League: NIRSA
- Sport: Soccer
- Site: University of Texas; Austin, Texas
- Duration: November 18–20, 1994
- Teams: 7 (men's championship); 8 (women's championship)

Men's Championship Division
- Score: 2–1
- Champion: Purdue (1st title, 1st title game)
- Runners-up: Washington State (1st title game)
- Season MVP: Michael Rowe (Purdue)

Women's Championship Division
- Score: 2–0
- Champion: Miami (OH) (1st title, 1st title game)
- Runners-up: Florida (1st title game)
- Season MVP: Corey Manning (Miami (OH))

NIRSA national soccer championships seasons
- 1995 →

The 1994 NIRSA national soccer championship was the 1st NIRSA National Soccer Championships, an annual national championships for United States-based, collegiate club soccer teams organized by NIRSA. It took place at the Whitaker Fields at the University of Texas in Austin, Texas from Friday, November 18 to Sunday, November 20, 1994. Notably, this tournament is the only one that didn't feature an open division.

== Overview ==
=== Men's championship ===
Purdue and Washington State would face off in the inaugural finals. Prior to this, in the group stage, Washington State would top their group after defeating Texas A&M 6–0 and defeating Texas Tech via forfeit. While Washington State reported beating Oklahoma 6–0, Oklahoma reported the match being a 3–3 draw, and since Washington State didn't receive the lone tournament bye, Oklahoma's report is the one that's assumed actually occurred. It's also assumed that Purdue won all their matches and were the only team to receive a bye to the semifinals.

In the quarterfinals, Washington State would defeat Arapahoe CC 15–0 and Oklahoma would defeat Wichita State 3–2. This is notable because this is the only time Arapahoe CC or Wichita State were mentioned, and since it's known only 7 teams attended, one of these teams were likely added to replace Texas Tech who forfeited their finale against Washington State. It's assumed the team that replaced them was Wichita State because they're closer to Austin than Arapahoe CC and therefore were not mentioned in official qualification/selection statistics. In the semifinals, Purdue would defeat Oklahoma 3–0 in what, presumably, was only their third match of the tournament while Washington State defeated hosts, Texas, 2–1, conceding their first goal of the tournament.

In the finals, Washington State would open the scoring and would take the 1–0 lead into halftime. Purdue would equalize with 14 minutes remaining in the match. Purdue would then take the lead and end up claiming the first NIRSA national championship with a 2–1 win over Washington State. Purdue's Michael Rowe would be named the division's MVP.

=== Women's championship ===
Miami (OH) and Florida would face off in the first championship finals. Prior to this, Miami (OH) would win their first three group stage games, first a 2–0 win over the hosts, Texas, then, presumably, a 1–0 win over Purdue, and then a dominant 12–0 win over Wichita State. In the group stage finale, Miami (OH) would face Tennessee and would end up losing 3–0, their first loss of the season. Due to this loss, Miami (OH) would claim the second overall seed and would face Purdue in the semifinals, while Florida would likely play Tennessee, assumed due to the fact that Tennessee was the only team to beat Miami (OH). In the semifinals, Miami (OH) would defeat Purdue 2–0 to advance to the finals to face Florida, who also won their semifinal match. Miami (OH) would defeat Florida 2–0 in the finals and claim the first national title. Miami (OH)'s Corey Manning would be named the tournament's MVP.

== Participating teams ==
=== Men's championship ===
Region	Team	Appearance	Last Bid
III	Purdue	1st	Never
IV	Oklahoma	1st	Never
IV	Texas A&M (Note: Technically, the team playing represented Texas A&M of Galveston, but since that's a branch college of Texas A&M they are counted as the general Texas A&M)	1st	Never
IV	Texas Tech	1st	Never
IV	Texas	1st	Never
V	Arapahoe CC	1st	Never
VI	Washington State	1st	Never

=== Women's championship ===
Region	Team	Appearance	Last Bid
II	Tennessee	1st	Never
II	Florida	1st	Never
III	Purdue	1st	Never
III	Ohio State	1st	Never
IIII	Miami (OH)	1st	Never
IV	Texas	1st	Never
V	Wichita State	1st	Never
?	?	1st	Never

== Group stage ==
=== Men's championship ===
Group A
Pos	Team	Pld	W	D	L	GF	GA	GD	Pts	Qualification
1	Washington State	3	2	1	0	15	3	+12	7	Advanced to quarterfinals
2	Oklahoma	3	2	1	0	12			7	Advanced to quarterfinals
3	Texas A&M	3								Advanced to quarterfinals
4	Texas Tech (Note: Texas Tech forfeited their final match, it's assumed Wichita State replaced them for the quarterfinals)	2								Advanced to quarterfinals

Fri, November 18	Oklahoma	3–1	Texas Tech	University of Texas; Austin, Texas
		Report		Stadium: Whitaker Fields

Fri, November 18	Washington State	6–0	Texas A&M	University of Texas; Austin, Texas
		Report		Stadium: Whitaker Fields

Fri, November 18	Oklahoma	3–3 (Note: Washington State reported the match as a 6–0 win but Oklahoma's report was the one used)	Washington State	University of Texas; Austin, Texas
		Report		Stadium: Whitaker Fields
Note: Washington State reported this match as a 6–0 win

Fri, November 18	Purdue	4–2	Texas Tech	University of Texas; Austin, Texas
		Report		Stadium: Whitaker Fields

Sat, November 19	Oklahoma	6–0	Texas A&M	University of Texas; Austin, Texas
		Report		Stadium: Whitaker Fields

Sat, November 19	Washington State	6–0	Texas Tech	University of Texas; Austin, Texas
		Report		Stadium: Whitaker Fields
Note: Texas Tech forfeited the match

Group B
Pos	Team	Pld	W	D	L	GF	GA	GD	Pts	Qualification
1	Purdue									Advanced to semifinals
2	Texas									Advanced to quarterfinals
3	Arapahoe CC									Advanced to quarterfinals

=== Women's championship ===
Pos	OVR Pos	Group A									
Pos	OVR Pos	Team	Pld	W	D	L	GF	GA	GD	Pts	Qualification
1	1	Tennessee (Note: While not known for sure, it's assumed Tennessee topped the group since they were the only team to beat Miami (OH))	4								Advanced to knockout stage
2	3	Purdue	4								Advanced to knockout stage
3–4	5–8	Texas	4								
3–4	5–8	Wichita State	4								
Pos	OVR Pos	Group B									
Pos	OVR Pos	Team	Pld	W	D	L	GF	GA	GD	Pts	Qualification
1	2	Miami (OH)	4	3	0	1	15	3	+12	9	Advanced to knockout stage
2	4	Florida	4								Advanced to knockout stage
3–4	5–8	Ohio State	4								
3–4	5–8	Unknown	4								

Fri, November 18	Miami (OH)	2–0	Texas	University of Texas; Austin, Texas
	Corey Manning	Report		Stadium: Whitaker Fields

Fri, November 18	Purdue	2–0	Texas	University of Texas; Austin, Texas
		Report		Stadium: Whitaker Fields

Fri, November 18	Miami (OH)	1–0	Purdue	University of Texas; Austin, Texas
	Emina Zvizdich	Report		Stadium: Whitaker Fields

Sat, November 19	Miami (OH)	12–0	Wichita State	University of Texas; Austin, Texas
		Report		Stadium: Whitaker Fields

Fri, November 19	Purdue	2–0	Ohio State	University of Texas; Austin, Texas
		Report		Stadium: Whitaker Fields

Sat, November 19	Miami (OH)	0–3	Tennessee	University of Texas; Austin, Texas
		Report		Stadium: Whitaker Fields

== Tournament bracket ==
=== Men's championship ===
Quarterfinals
Oklahoma	3
Wichita State	2
Washington State	15
Arapahoe CC	0
Texas
Texas A&M

Semifinals
Purdue	3
Oklahoma	0
Washington State	2
Texas	1

Finals
Purdue	2
Washington State	1

=== Women's championship ===
Semifinals
1	Tennessee
4	Florida
2	Miami (OH)	2
3	Purdue	0

Final
Florida	0
Miami (OH)	2

== All-tournament teams ==
=== Men's championship ===
Name	Team
Michael Rowe (Note: Most Valuable Player)	Purdue
Chris Becker	Purdue
Pat Doyle	Purdue
Joe Kurijiaka	Purdue
Kevin Glasse	Washington State
Mike Loffland	Oklahoma
Juan Strutton	Oklahoma
Scott Bradford	Oklahoma
Mike Segroves	Oklahoma

=== Women's championship ===
Name	Team
Corey Manning	Miami (OH)
Carole Fanning	Miami (OH)
Nancy Marazzi	Miami (OH)
Katie Crowley	Miami (OH)
Tara Lagu	Purdue
Ariel Falk	Purdue
