= 2016 SCSA Regional Tournament =

- Association: NIRSA
- League: Southeast Collegiate Soccer Alliance
- Sport: Soccer
- Site: Ashton Brosnaham Soccer Complex; Pensacola, Florida
- Duration: October 28–30, 2016
- Teams: 16 (men's); 12 (women's)

Men's Championship Division
- Score: 1–0
- Champion: UCF (1st title, 2nd title game)
- Runners-up: North Carolina (2nd title game)
- Season MVP: Omar Vallejo (UCF)

Women's Championship Division
- Score: 1–0
- Champion: North Carolina (4th title, 4th title game)
- Runners-up: NC State (2nd title game)
- Season MVP: Leah Levey (North Carolina)

Southeast Collegiate Soccer Alliance seasons
- 2015 2017

The 2016 Southeast Collegiate Soccer Alliance Regional Tournament was the 7th edition of the Southeast Collegiate Soccer Alliance's postseason club soccer tournament, which was held at Ashton Brosnaham Soccer Complex in Pensacola, Florida, from October 28–30, 2016. A tournament was held for each the men's and women's division, with each tournament champion receiving an automatic bid to the 2016 NIRSA National Soccer Championship's championship division. The remaining 2 of NIRSA Region II's automatic bids for each division were given out based on RPI, with a special consideration to this tournament's performance.

== Format ==
The tournament consisted of twelve women’s teams and sixteen men’s teams. Each divisional champion received an automatic bid (6 for the women and 8 for the men) with the remaining wild card teams being the next highest RPI ranked teams that had not already qualified. Teams were divided into groups based on RPI.

For the men's division group stage, the 16 teams were split into four groups of four teams each. Each team played every other team in their group meaning a total of 6 games were played within a group. The top two teams from each group advanced to the knockout round.

For the women's division group stage, the 12 teams were split into three groups of four teams each. Each team played every other team in their group meaning a total of 6 games were played within a group. The top two teams from each group advanced to the semi-finals, with the best two teams across all pools receiving a bye to the semifinals.

== Participants ==
=== Men's ===
Divisional champions
Division	Team	Appearance	Last bid
Atlantic North	North Carolina	7th	2015
Atlantic South	UNC-Wilmington	3rd	2015
Coastal	Miami	1st	Never
Coastal Plains	Florida	6th	2014
Central	Georgia Tech	2nd	2015
Gulf Coast	Auburn	4th	2014
Mountain East	JMU	Did not attend	
Mountain West	UT-Chattanooga	1st	Never

At-large bids
Team	Appearance	Last bid
UCF	6th	2015
Lynn	2nd	2015
Virginia	6th	2015
Georgia	5th	2014
Clemson	4th	2015
Emory	1st	Never
Appalachian State	2nd	2015
NC State	3rd	2015
Florida State	3rd	2015

=== Women's ===
Divisional champions
Division	Team	Appearance	Last bid
North	Virginia	7th	2015
Northeast	North Carolina	7th	2015
Northwest	NKU	1st	Never
Southeast	Clemson	5th	2015
Southwest	Georgia	4th	2015
Florida	UCF	3rd	2015

At-large bids
Team	Appearance	Last bid
NC State	5th	2015
Tennessee	1st	Never
Florida State	3rd	2015
Emory	1st	Never
Florida	7th	2015
Virginia Tech	7th	2015

== Group stage ==
=== Men's ===
Group A
Pos	Team	Pld	W	D	L	GF	GA	GD	Pts	Qualification
1	UCF	3	3	0	0	8	2	+6	9	Advanced to knockout stage
2	North Carolina	3	2	0	1	6	4	+2	6	Advanced to knockout stage
3	Lynn	3	1	0	2	4	7	−3	3	
4	UNC-Wilmington	3	0	0	3	0	5	−5	0	

9:30pm EST	North Carolina	1–3	UCF	Field 4
Fri, October 28				Stadium: Ashton Brosnaham Soccer Complex; Pensacola, Florida

9:30pm EST	UNC-Wilmington	0–2	Lynn	Field 6
Fri, October 28				Stadium: Ashton Brosnaham Soccer Complex; Pensacola, Florida

9:45am EST	UNC-Wilmington	0–2	North Carolina	Field 6
Sat, October 29				Stadium: Ashton Brosnaham Soccer Complex; Pensacola, Florida

9:45am EST	UCF	4–1	Lynn	Field 4
Sat, October 29				Stadium: Ashton Brosnaham Soccer Complex; Pensacola, Florida

3:00pm EST	UCF	1–0	UNC-Wilmington	Field 4
Sat, October 29				Stadium: Ashton Brosnaham Soccer Complex; Pensacola, Florida

3:00pm EST	Lynn	1–3	North Carolina	Field 6
Sat, October 29				Stadium: Ashton Brosnaham Soccer Complex; Pensacola, Florida

Group B
Pos	Team	Pld	W	D	L	GF	GA	GD	Pts	Qualification
1	Virginia	3	3	0	0	9	3	+6	9	Advanced to knockout stage
2	Georgia	3	2	0	1	6	2	+4	6	Advanced to knockout stage
3	Clemson	3	1	0	2	4	6	−2	3	
4	Miami	3	0	0	3	3	11	−8	0	

7:45pm EST	Virginia	1–0	Georgia	Field 5
Fri, October 28				Stadium: Ashton Brosnaham Soccer Complex; Pensacola, Florida

9:30pm EST	Miami	1–2	Clemson	Field 5
Fri, October 28				Stadium: Ashton Brosnaham Soccer Complex; Pensacola, Florida

9:45am EST	Miami	2–5	Virginia	Field 7
Sat, October 29				Stadium: Ashton Brosnaham Soccer Complex; Pensacola, Florida

9:45am EST	Georgia	2–1	Clemson	Field 5
Sat, October 29				Stadium: Ashton Brosnaham Soccer Complex; Pensacola, Florida

3:00pm EST	Georgia	4–0	Miami	Field 7
Sat, October 29				Stadium: Ashton Brosnaham Soccer Complex; Pensacola, Florida

3:00pm EST	Clemson	1–3	Virginia	Field 5
Sat, October 29				Stadium: Ashton Brosnaham Soccer Complex; Pensacola, Florida

Group C
Pos	Team	Pld	W	D	L	GF	GA	GD	Pts	Qualification
1	Florida	3	2	1	0	6	2	+4	7	Advanced to knockout stage
2	Emory	3	1	2	0	3	2	+1	5	Advanced to knockout stage
3	Appalachian State	3	1	1	1	4	4	0	4	
4	UT-Chattanooga	3	0	0	3	1	6	−5	0	

6:00pm EST	Florida	0–0	Emory	Field 5
Fri, October 28				Stadium: Ashton Brosnaham Soccer Complex; Pensacola, Florida

7:45pm EST	UT-Chattanooga	0–1	App State	Field 7
Fri, October 28				Stadium: Ashton Brosnaham Soccer Complex; Pensacola, Florida

8:00am EST	UT-Chattanooga	0–3	Florida	Field 5
Sat, October 29				Stadium: Ashton Brosnaham Soccer Complex; Pensacola, Florida

8:00am EST	Emory	1–1	App State	Field 6
Sat, October 29				Stadium: Ashton Brosnaham Soccer Complex; Pensacola, Florida

1:15pm EST	Emory	2–1	UT-Chattanooga	Field 6
Sat, October 29				Stadium: Ashton Brosnaham Soccer Complex; Pensacola, Florida

1:15pm EST	App State	2–3	Florida	Field 5
Sat, October 29				Stadium: Ashton Brosnaham Soccer Complex; Pensacola, Florida

Group D
Pos	Team	Pld	W	D	L	GF	GA	GD	Pts	Qualification
1	Georgia Tech	3	2	1	0	5	3	+2	7	Advanced to knockout stage
2	NC State	3	2	0	1	5	3	+2	6	Advanced to knockout stage
3	Auburn	3	0	2	1	4	5	−1	2	
4	Florida State	3	0	1	2	3	6	−3	1	

6:00pm EST	Georgia Tech	2–1	NC State	Field 7
Fri, October 28				Stadium: Ashton Brosnaham Soccer Complex; Pensacola, Florida

6:00pm EST	Auburn	2–2	Florida State	Field 8
Fri, October 28				Stadium: Ashton Brosnaham Soccer Complex; Pensacola, Florida

8:00am EST	Auburn	1–1	Georgia Tech	Field 4
Sat, October 29				Stadium: Ashton Brosnaham Soccer Complex; Pensacola, Florida

8:00am EST	NC State	2–0	Florida State	Field 7
Sat, October 29				Stadium: Ashton Brosnaham Soccer Complex; Pensacola, Florida

1:15pm EST	NC State	2–1	Auburn	Field 7
Sat, October 29				Stadium: Ashton Brosnaham Soccer Complex; Pensacola, Florida

1:15pm EST	Florida State	1–2	Georgia Tech	Field 8
Sat, October 29				Stadium: Ashton Brosnaham Soccer Complex; Pensacola, Florida

=== Women's ===
Group A
Pos	Team	Pld	W	D	L	GF	GA	GD	Pts	Qualification	Seed
1	NC State	3	2	1	0	10	1	+7	7	Advanced to semifinals	1
2	Georgia	3	2	1	0	3	1	+2	7	Advanced to first round	4
3	Tennessee	3	1	0	2	5	10	−3	3		8
4	UCF	3	0	0	3	2	8	−6	0		12

7:45pm EST	Georgia	2–1	Tennessee	Field 8
Fri, October 28				Stadium: Ashton Brosnaham Soccer Complex; Pensacola, Florida

7:45pm EST	NC State	3–1	UCF	Field 4
Fri, October 28				Stadium: Ashton Brosnaham Soccer Complex; Pensacola, Florida

8:00am EST	NC State	0–0	Georgia	Field 8
Sat, October 29				Stadium: Ashton Brosnaham Soccer Complex; Pensacola, Florida

9:45am EST	Tennessee	4–1	UCF	Field 8
Sat, October 29				Stadium: Ashton Brosnaham Soccer Complex; Pensacola, Florida

3:00pm EST	Tennessee	0–7	NC State	Field 8
Sat, October 29				Stadium: Ashton Brosnaham Soccer Complex; Pensacola, Florida

4:45pm EST	UCF	0–1	Georgia	Field 8
Sat, October 29				Stadium: Ashton Brosnaham Soccer Complex; Pensacola, Florida

Group B
Pos	Team	Pld	W	D	L	GF	GA	GD	Pts	Qualification	Seed
1	Virginia	3	2	1	0	7	0	+6	7	Advanced to semifinals	2
2	Florida State	3	2	1	0	5	1	+4	7	Advanced to first round	3
3	Emory	3	0	1	2	1	4	−3	1		10
4	NKU	3	0	1	2	2	10	−7	1		11

6:00pm EST	Florida State	3–1	NKU	Field 4
Fri, October 28				Stadium: Ashton Brosnaham Soccer Complex; Pensacola, Florida

9:30pm EST	Emory	0–1	Virginia	Field 7
Fri, October 28				Stadium: Ashton Brosnaham Soccer Complex; Pensacola, Florida

11:30am EST	Emory	0–2	Florida State	Field 7
Sat, October 29				Stadium: Ashton Brosnaham Soccer Complex; Pensacola, Florida

11:30am EST	NKU	0–6	Virginia	Field 4
Sat, October 29				Stadium: Ashton Brosnaham Soccer Complex; Pensacola, Florida

4:45pm EST	NKU	1–1	Emory	Field 7
Sat, October 29				Stadium: Ashton Brosnaham Soccer Complex; Pensacola, Florida

4:45pm EST	Virginia	0–0	Florida State	Field 4
Sat, October 29				Stadium: Ashton Brosnaham Soccer Complex; Pensacola, Florida

Group C
Pos	Team	Pld	W	D	L	GF	GA	GD	Pts	Qualification	Seed
1	Florida	3	2	0	1	2	1	+1	6	Advanced to first round	5
2	North Carolina	3	2	0	1	4	1	+3	6	Advanced to first round	6
3	Virginia Tech	3	1	0	2	4	4	0	3		7
4	Clemson	3	1	0	2	1	5	−4	3		9

7:45pm EST	Clemson	0–4	Virginia Tech	Field 6
Fri, October 28				Stadium: Ashton Brosnaham Soccer Complex; Pensacola, Florida

9:30pm EST	Florida	1–0	North Carolina	Field 8
Fri, October 28				Stadium: Ashton Brosnaham Soccer Complex; Pensacola, Florida

11:30am EST	Florida	0–1	Clemson	Field 6
Sat, October 29				Stadium: Ashton Brosnaham Soccer Complex; Pensacola, Florida

11:30am EST	Virginia Tech	0–3	North Carolina	Field 8
Sat, October 29				Stadium: Ashton Brosnaham Soccer Complex; Pensacola, Florida

4:45pm EST	Virginia Tech	0–1	Florida	Field 6
Sat, October 29				Stadium: Ashton Brosnaham Soccer Complex; Pensacola, Florida

4:45pm EST	North Carolina	1–0	Clemson	Field 5
Sat, October 29				Stadium: Ashton Brosnaham Soccer Complex; Pensacola, Florida

== Tournament bracket ==
=== Men's ===
Quarterfinals
Sat • 6:30pm • Field 4
UCF	3
NC State	0
Sat • 6:30pm • Field 5
Florida	0
Georgia	1
Sat • 6:30pm • Field 7
Virginia	1
Emory	0
Sat • 6:30pm • Field 8
Georgia Tech	2
North Carolina (a.e.t.)	3

Semifinals
Sun • 9:00am • Field 4
UCF	3
Georgia	0
Sun • 9:00am • Field 5
Virginia	0
North Carolina (a.e.t.)	1

Final
Sun • 12:00pm • Field 5
UCF	1
North Carolina	0

=== Women's ===
First round
Sat • 8:15pm • Field 4
4	Georgia	0
5	Florida (a.e.t.)	1
Sat • 8:15pm • Field 5
3	Florida State	0
6	North Carolina	1

Semifinals
Sun • 9:00am • Field 7
NC State	0 (5)
Florida (pen.)	0 (3)
Sun • 9:00am • Field 6
Virginia	0
North Carolina	1

Final
Sun • 12:00pm • Field 4
NC State	0
North Carolina	1

== National Championship performance ==
=== Men's ===
Team	Qualification	App	Last bid	Result
UCF	Tournament champion	3rd	2015	Consolation semifinalist (2–2 | 6–7 penalties vs Colorado)
North Carolina	Highest RPI remaining teams	12th	2015	Sweet 16 (1–2 vs Texas A&M)
Virginia	2nd highest RPI remaining teams	8th	2014	Champion (3-2 vs Ohio State)
Georgia Tech	National wildcard	3rd	2004	Consolation champion (3-0 vs Colorado)
Florida	National wildcard	10th	2014	Consolation quarterfinalist (forfeit vs North Texas)

=== Women's ===
Team	Qualification	App	Last bid	Result
North Carolina	Tournament champion	12th	2015	Finalist (0–1 vs UC-Santa Barbara)
Virginia	Highest RPI remaining teams	9th	2014	Consolation semifinalist (0–0 3–5 penalties vs Cal Poly)
Florida	2nd highest RPI remaining teams	14th	2015	Consolation finalist (0–0 | 3–5 penalties vs Cal Poly)
Florida State	National wildcard	3rd	2014	Consolation quarterfinalist (1–6 vs Florida)

== Notes ==
- Many details obtained through SCSA's Twitter, however generally unreliable and therefore uncited
