= 2014 NIRSA National Soccer Championship =

- League: NIRSA
- Sport: Soccer
- Site: Mike Rose Soccer Complex; Memphis, Tennessee
- Duration: November 20–22, 2014
- Teams: 24
- Results: Official Results

Men's Championship Division
- Score: 1–0 (a.e.t.)
- Champion: Ohio State (1st title, 1st title game)
- Runners-up: San Diego State (1st title game)
- Season MVP: Alex Bujenovic (Ohio State)

Women's Championship Division
- Score: 2–0
- Champion: Ohio State (1st title, 2nd title game)
- Runners-up: Miami (OH) (5th title game)
- Season MVP: Ellen Haas (Ohio State)

Men's Open Division
- Score: 2–1
- Champion: UC-Berkeley (2nd title, 4th title game)
- Runners-up: UCF (1st title game)
- Season MVP: Amir Guedoir (UC-Berkeley)

Women's Open Division
- Score: 2–0
- Champion: Michigan (1st title, 1st title game)
- Runners-up: UCLA (2nd title game)
- Top seed: Beth Boyer (Michigan)

NIRSA national soccer championships seasons
- ← 2013 2015 →

The 2014 NIRSA national soccer championship was the 21st NIRSA National Soccer Championships, the annual national championships for United States-based, collegiate club soccer teams organized by NIRSA. It took place at Mike Rose Soccer Complex in Memphis, Tennessee from Thursday, November 20 to Saturday, November 22, 2014. This marks a return to play after the previous tournament was unable to name a champion due to rain.

== Overview ==
=== Men's championship ===
In the finals, Ohio State and San Diego State would face off in both teams' first finals. Coming into the finals, San Diego State defeated reigning champion from the 2012 tournament, Michigan State, 1–0 in the semi-finals while Ohio State beat 2004 champion, Texas A&M 4–2 in the semifinals. The game would be scoreless at the end of regulation, meaning a 15-minute, sudden-victory period would be played. Three minutes before the end of extra time, eventual MVP Alex Bujenovic of Ohio State would score a low cross and lead Ohio State to a 1–0 victory and their first national title.

=== Women's championship ===
In the finals, Ohio State and Miami (OH), two Region III opponents, would meet for the third time this season. Miami (OH) won the first two meetings 1–0, the first being on October 5 in the regular season and the second being in the W-MASC Region III regional tournament. Coming into the finals, Miami (OH) had won their first 4 games, including a 4–3 penalty shootout victory against the division's most successful team, UC-Santa Barbara. Conversely, Ohio State lost their opener to aforementioned UC-Santa Barbara, but won their next 4, including a 1–0 victory in extra time over Texas via a PK. In the finals, eventual MVP Ellen Haas of Ohio State would score in the 35th and 63rd minute to win 2–0 and prevent Miami (OH) from beating them 3 straight times. This was Ohio State's first national title, joining their male counterparts.

=== Men's open ===
In the finals, the 2012 open finalists, UC-Berkeley, were looking to claim their second open title over Region II regional finalist UCF in their first open division finals. In the finals, UC-Berkeley scored first in the 50th minute but UCF tied it 8 minutes later, the first goal they conceded all tournament. 3 minutes prior to the end of regulation, UC-Berkeley would take the lead again, which would be enough for them to claim their second open title. UC-Berkeley only scored 5 goals in their six games with 2 of them coming in the finals, and their own Amir Guedoir was named MVP.

=== Women's open ===
In the finals, 2008 open division champions UCLA would face 2005 championship division champions Michigan in their first open divisional finals. Michigan started the knockout round by beating the reigning open division champions, JMU, 2–0 in the quarterfinals while UCLA needed extra time in their quarterfinal matchup against Northeastern. Michigan took the lead in the 56th minute and doubled it in the 61st minute to win 2–0 and claim their first women's open division title. Michigan didn't give up a goal in any of their 6 games and their own Beth Boyer was named divisional MVP.

== Format ==
The competition consisted of 96 teams: 48 men's teams and 48 women's teams. Each of these divisions were further divided into two 24-team divisions: the championship and open. The championship division divided teams into eight groups of three while the open division divided teams into six groups of four, both engaging in a round-robin tournament that determined teams able to advance to a knockout stage. Pool play games were two 40-minute halves, separated by a seven-minute halftime and utilized the three points for a win system. In the championship division, the two highest ranked teams from each group advanced to their knockout stage, with the third placed team advancing to a consolation bracket. In the open division, the top team from each group as well as the two best second placed teams advanced to their knockout stage.

Tie-breaking criteria for group play
The ranking of teams in each group was based on the following criteria in order:
1. Highest number of points
2. Winner of head-to-head competition
3. Greatest goal difference
  - Maximum ± 5 goal difference per match
4. Most goals scored
5. Most shutouts

In a tie breaking scenario involving more than 2 teams, the tiebreaker procedure would begin. If one team is identified as different and both remaining teams are still tied, the tie breaker procedure is restarted.

If a tie still remained after the first 5 criteria, the following was used to break a tie:

1. NCAA kicks from the mark
  - If there was a three-way tie, a coin-flip would be conducted. The two teams that chose the same outcome would compete in kicks from the mark between each other. The winner would compete with the last remaining team in kicks from the mark
  - If there's a four-way tie, a drawing of lots would be conducted (only could occur in open division)

Knockout stage games also consisted of two 40-minute halves. The round of 16 and quarterfinals were separated by a seven-minute halftime while the semifinals and finals had a ten-minute halftime. Knockout stage games needed to declare a winner. If a knockout-stage game was tied at the end of regulation, overtime would begin. Overtime consisted of one, 15-minute, golden-goal period. If still tied after overtime, kicks from the mark would determine the winner.

== Qualification and selections ==
Each of the six regions received three automatic bids for both the men's and women's championship that they awarded to its members. The final six bids were considered "at-large", and were given out by NIRSA to teams, typically based on their regional tournament results and RPI.

The 48 remaining teams participated in the open division and were selected via a lottery draw that aired on YouTube on September 30, 2014, at 3pm EST. This was the first time a lottery was utilized. If a selected team qualified for the championship division, an alternate took their spot. 54 men's teams and 43 women's were selected.

=== Men's championship ===
Automatic bids
Region	Team	Appearance	Last Bid
I	Delaware	9th	2013
I	Tufts	1st	Never
I	UConn	2nd	2011
II	Florida	9th	2013
II	Virginia Tech	7th	2013
II	Florida State	1st	Never
III	Illinois	12th	2013
III	Ohio State	10th	2013
III	Cincinnati	3rd	2013
IV	Texas	16th	2013
IV	Rice	3rd	2013
IV	SMU	2nd	2006
V	Colorado State	17th	2013
V	Colorado Mines	4th	2013
V	Iowa State	1st	Never
VI	Cal Poly	6th	2013
VI	Utah State	1st	Never
VI	UTEP	3rd	2013

At-large bids
Region	Team	Appearance	Last Bid
I	UMass	2nd	2010
II	Virginia	7th	2010
III	Marquette	1st	Never
III	Michigan State	8th	2013
IV	Texas A&M	15th	2013
VI	San Diego State	4th	2007

=== Women's championship ===
Automatic bids
Region	Team	Appearance	Last Bid
I	Delaware	12th	2013
I	Pittsburgh	5th	2013
I	Penn State	19th	2013
II	North Carolina	11th	2013
II	NC State	1st	Never
II	Virginia	8th	2012
III	Ohio State	14th	2013
III	Miami (OH)	14th	2013
III	Michigan State	11th	2012
IV	Texas	15th	2013
IV	Texas A&M	15th	2013
IV	Kansas	5th	2012
V	Colorado	20th	2013
V	Colorado State	18th	2013
V	Colorado Mines	3rd	2011
VI	Oregon	1st	Never
VI	UC-Davis	2nd	2006
VI	Cal State Northridge	1st	Never

At-large bids
Region	Team	Appearance	Last Bid
I	Cornell	8th	2012
II	Florida	12th	2013
II	Florida State	2nd	2000
III	Illinois	10th	2013
VI	UC-Santa Barbara	14th	2013
VI	USC	2nd	2013

=== Men's lottery selection ===
Full men's lottery selections
Region	Team	Selection Type	Bid result
I	George Mason	Automatic	Accepted
I	Cornell	Automatic	Accepted
I	Rochester	Automatic	Not accepted
I	SUNY Cortland	Automatic	Accepted
I	Boston College	Waitlist	Accepted from waitlist
I	Northeastern	Waitlist	Accepted from waitlist
I	Stony Brook	Waitlist	Accepted from waitlist
I	Penn State	Waitlist	Not given
I	Binghamton	Waitlist	Not given
I	Penn	Waitlist	Not given
I	Canisius	Waitlist	Not given
I	Villanova	Waitlist	Not given
I	UConn	Waitlist	Championship
I	Brown	Waitlist	Not given
I	Vermont	Waitlist	Not given
I	Brockport	Waitlist	Not given
II	Mary Washington	Automatic	Accepted
II	UCF	Automatic	Accepted
II	Virginia Tech	Automatic	Championship
II	ECTC	Automatic	Not accepted
II	Miami (FL)	Waitlist	Accepted from waitlist
II	JMU	Waitlist	Accepted from waitlist
II	East Carolina	Waitlist	Not given
II	Memphis	Waitlist	Not given
II	USF St. Petersburg	Waitlist	Not given
III	Cincinnati	Automatic	Championship
III	Purdue	Automatic	Accepted
III	Illinois	Automatic	Accepted
III	UW-Whitewater	Automatic	Not accepted
III	UW-Milwaukee	Waitlist	Accepted from waitlist
IV	Texas	Automatic	Accepted
IV	Wash U	Automatic	Accepted
IV	Missouri	Automatic	Accepted
IV	Arkansas	Automatic	Accepted
IV	Texas Tech	Waitlist	Accepted from waitlist
IV	Kansas	Waitlist	Not given
IV	Kansas State	Waitlist	Not given
V	Colorado Springs	Automatic	Accepted
V	Iowa State	Automatic	Championship
V	Minnesota	Automatic	Not accepted
V	Colorado State	Automatic	Championship
V	Colorado Mines	Waitlist	Championship
VI	UC-Berkeley	Automatic	Accepted
VI	Oregon	Automatic	Accepted
VI	Loyola Marymount	Automatic	Not accepted
VI	Idaho State	Automatic	Not accepted
VI	UC-Davis	Waitlist	Accepted from waitlist
VI	Cal Poly SLO	Waitlist	Championship
VI	Utah Valley	Waitlist	Accepted from waitlist
VI	UCLA	Waitlist	Accepted from waitlist
VI	San Diego State	Waitlist	Championship
VI	Stanford	Waitlist	Not given
VI	LDS Business College	Waitlist	Not given
VI	Cal State Northridge	Waitlist	Not given

Participating teams
Region	Team	Selection Type	Bid result
I	George Mason	Automatic	Accepted
I	Cornell	Automatic	Accepted
I	SUNY Cortland	Automatic	Accepted
I	Boston College	Waitlist	Accepted from waitlist
I	Northeastern	Waitlist	Accepted from waitlist
I	Stony Brook	Waitlist	Accepted from waitlist
II	Mary Washington	Automatic	Accepted
II	UCF	Automatic	Accepted
II	Miami (FL)	Waitlist	Accepted from waitlist
II	JMU	Waitlist	Accepted from waitlist
III	Purdue	Automatic	Accepted
III	Illinois	Automatic	Accepted
III	UW-Milwaukee	Waitlist	Accepted from waitlist
IV	Texas	Automatic	Accepted
IV	Wash U	Automatic	Accepted
IV	Missouri	Automatic	Accepted
IV	Arkansas	Automatic	Accepted
IV	Texas Tech	Waitlist	Accepted from waitlist
V	Colorado Springs	Automatic	Accepted
VI	UC-Berkeley	Automatic	Accepted
VI	Oregon	Automatic	Accepted
VI	UC-Davis	Waitlist	Accepted from waitlist
VI	Utah Valley	Waitlist	Accepted from waitlist
VI	UCLA	Waitlist	Accepted from waitlist

=== Women's lottery selection ===
Full women's lottery selections
Region	Team	Selection Type	Bid result
I	Georgetown	Automatic	Accepted
I	Northeastern	Automatic	Accepted
I	Penn	Automatic	Accepted
I	Fordham	Automatic	Accepted
I	UConn	Waitlist	Accepted from waitlist
I	UMass	Waitlist	Accepted from waitlist
I	Boston	Waitlist	Not given
I	Villanova	Waitlist	Not given
I	Vermont	Waitlist	Not given
I	Rutgers	Waitlist	Not given
I	SUNY Cortland	Waitlist	Not given
I	Brockport	Waitlist	Not given
I	Penn State	Waitlist	Championship
I	Boston College	Waitlist	Not given
II	South Carolina	Automatic	Not accepted
II	Vanderbilt	Automatic	Accepted
II	UCF	Automatic	Accepted
II	Virginia Tech	Automatic	Accepted
II	Mary Washington	Waitlist	Accepted from waitlist
II	JMU	Waitlist	Accepted from waitlist
II	Miami (FL)	Waitlist	Accepted from waitlist
III	Cornell	Automatic	Championship
III	UW-Milwaukee	Automatic	Accepted
III	Illinois	Automatic	Championship
III	Michigan	Automatic	Accepted
IV	Texas	Automatic	Championship
IV	Kansas	Automatic	Championship
IV	Texas Tech	Automatic	Accepted
IV	Wash U	Automatic	Accepted
IV	Missouri	Waitlist	Accepted from waitlist
V	Iowa	Automatic	Accepted
V	Iowa State	Automatic	Accepted
V	Colorado Mines	Automatic	Championship
V	Colorado	Automatic	Accepted
V	Colorado State	Waitlist	Championship
VI	Northern Arizona	Automatic	Not accepted
VI	USC	Automatic	Accepted
VI	UC-Santa Barbara	Automatic	Championship
VI	UC-Davis	Automatic	Championship
VI	UCLA	Waitlist	Accepted from waitlist
VI	San Diego State	Waitlist	Accepted from waitlist
VI	UC-Berkeley	Waitlist	Not given
VI	Oregon	Waitlist	Championship

Participating teams
Region	Team	Selection Type	Bid result
I	Georgetown	Automatic	Accepted
I	Northeastern	Automatic	Accepted
I	Penn	Automatic	Accepted
I	Fordham	Automatic	Accepted
I	UConn	Waitlist	Accepted from waitlist
I	UMass	Waitlist	Accepted from waitlist
II	Vanderbilt	Automatic	Accepted
II	UCF	Automatic	Accepted
II	Virginia Tech	Automatic	Accepted
II	Mary Washington	Waitlist	Accepted from waitlist
II	JMU	Waitlist	Accepted from waitlist
II	Miami (FL)	Waitlist	Accepted from waitlist
III	UW-Milwaukee	Automatic	Accepted
III	Michigan	Automatic	Accepted
IV	Texas Tech	Automatic	Accepted
IV	Wash U	Automatic	Accepted
IV	Missouri	Waitlist	Accepted from waitlist
V	Iowa	Automatic	Accepted
V	Iowa State	Automatic	Accepted
V	Colorado	Automatic	Accepted
V	Colorado Mesa	Invite	Accepted via invite
VI	USC	Automatic	Accepted
VI	UCLA	Waitlist	Accepted from waitlist
VI	San Diego State	Waitlist	Accepted from waitlist

== Group stage ==
=== Men's championship ===
Group A
Pos	Team	Pld	W	D	L	GF	GA	GD	Pts	Qualification
1	Michigan State	2	1	1	0	5	1	+4	4	Advanced to knockout stage
2	Florida	2	1	1	0	4	1	+3	4	Advanced to knockout stage
3	Rice	2	0	0	2	0	7	−7	0	Consolation

Scores

8:00am CST	Florida	1–1	Michigan State	Field 2
Thu, November 20		Report		Stadium: Mike Rose Soccer Complex; Memphis, Tennessee

1:15pm CST	Michigan State	4–0	Rice	Field 2
Thu, November 20		Report		Stadium: Mike Rose Soccer Complex; Memphis, Tennessee

6:30pm CST	Rice	0–3	Florida	Field 2
Thu, November 20		Report		Stadium: Mike Rose Soccer Complex; Memphis, Tennessee

Group B
Pos	Team	Pld	W	D	L	GF	GA	GD	Pts	Qualification
1	San Diego State	2	1	1	0	3	0	+3	4	Advanced to knockout stage
2	SMU	2	0	2	0	1	1	0	2	Advanced to knockout stage
3	Iowa State	2	0	1	1	1	4	−3	1	Consolation

Scores

8:00am CST	SMU	0–0	San Diego State	Field 3
Thu, November 20		Report		Stadium: Mike Rose Soccer Complex; Memphis, Tennessee

1:15pm CST	San Diego State	3–0	Iowa State	Field 3
Thu, November 20		Report		Stadium: Mike Rose Soccer Complex; Memphis, Tennessee

6:30pm CST	Iowa State	1–1	SMU	Field 3
Thu, November 20		Report		Stadium: Mike Rose Soccer Complex; Memphis, Tennessee

Group C
Pos	Team	Pld	W	D	L	GF	GA	GD	Pts	Qualification
1	Cal Poly	2	1	1	0	2	1	+1	4	Advanced to knockout stage
2	Colorado State	2	1	0	1	3	2	+1	3	Advanced to knockout stage
3	UMass	2	0	1	1	0	2	−2	1	Consolation

Scores

8:00am CST	Cal Poly	0–0	UMass	Field 4
Thu, November 20		Report		Stadium: Mike Rose Soccer Complex; Memphis, Tennessee

1:15pm CST	UMass	0–2	Colorado State	Field 4
Thu, November 20		Report		Stadium: Mike Rose Soccer Complex; Memphis, Tennessee

6:30pm CST	Colorado State	1–2	Cal Poly	Field 4
Thu, November 20		Report		Stadium: Mike Rose Soccer Complex; Memphis, Tennessee

Group D
Pos	Team	Pld	W	D	L	GF	GA	GD	Pts	Qualification
1	Ohio State	2	2	0	0	3	1	+2	6	Advanced to knockout stage
2	Virginia	2	1	0	1	2	2	0	3	Advanced to knockout stage
3	UTEP	2	0	0	2	0	2	−2	0	Consolation

Scores

8:00am CST	Ohio State	2–1	Virginia	Field 5
Thu, November 20		Report		Stadium: Mike Rose Soccer Complex; Memphis, Tennessee

1:15pm CST	Virginia	1–0	UTEP	Field 5
Thu, November 20		Report		Stadium: Mike Rose Soccer Complex; Memphis, Tennessee

6:30pm CST	UTEP	0–1	Ohio State	Field 5
Thu, November 20		Report		Stadium: Mike Rose Soccer Complex; Memphis, Tennessee

Group E
Pos	Team	Pld	W	D	L	GF	GA	GD	Pts	Qualification
1	Virginia Tech	2	2	0	0	7	2	+5	6	Advanced to knockout stage
2	UConn	2	1	0	1	3	4	−1	3	Advanced to knockout stage
3	Marquette	2	0	0	2	2	6	−4	0	Consolation

Scores

9:45am CST	Virginia Tech	4–1	Marquette	Field 2
Thu, November 20		Report		Stadium: Mike Rose Soccer Complex; Memphis, Tennessee

3:00pm CST	Marquette	1–2	UConn	Field 2
Thu, November 20		Report		Stadium: Mike Rose Soccer Complex; Memphis, Tennessee

8:15pm CST	UConn	1–3	Virginia Tech	Field 2
Thu, November 20		Report		Stadium: Mike Rose Soccer Complex; Memphis, Tennessee

Group F
Pos	Team	Pld	W	D	L	GF	GA	GD	Pts	Qualification
1	Florida State	2	1	1	0	1	1	0	4	Advanced to knockout stage
2	Utah State	2	0	2	0	1	0	+1	2	Advanced to knockout stage
3	Delaware	2	0	1	1	1	2	−1	1	Consolation

Scores

9:45am CST	Delaware	0–1	Florida State	Field 3
Thu, November 20		Report		Stadium: Mike Rose Soccer Complex; Memphis, Tennessee

3:00pm CST	Florida State	0–0	Utah State	Field 3
Thu, November 20		Report		Stadium: Mike Rose Soccer Complex; Memphis, Tennessee

8:15pm CST	Utah State	1–1	Delaware	Field 3
Thu, November 20		Report		Stadium: Mike Rose Soccer Complex; Memphis, Tennessee

Group G
Pos	Team	Pld	W	D	L	GF	GA	GD	Pts	Qualification
1	Cincinnati	2	1	1	0	2	1	+1	4	Advanced to knockout stage
2	Texas A&M	2	1	1	0	1	0	+1	4	Advanced to knockout stage
3	Colorado Mines	2	0	0	2	1	3	−2	0	Consolation

Scores

9:45am CST	Cincinnati	0–0	Texas A&M	Field 4
Thu, November 20		Report		Stadium: Mike Rose Soccer Complex; Memphis, Tennessee

3:00pm CST	Texas A&M	1–0	Colorado Mines	Field 4
Thu, November 20		Report		Stadium: Mike Rose Soccer Complex; Memphis, Tennessee

8:15pm CST	Colorado Mines	1–2	Cincinnati	Field 4
Thu, November 20		Report		Stadium: Mike Rose Soccer Complex; Memphis, Tennessee

Group H
Pos	Team	Pld	W	D	L	GF	GA	GD	Pts	Qualification
1	Illinois	2	2	0	0	5	3	+2	6	Advanced to knockout stage
2	Texas	2	1	0	1	4	2	+2	3	Advanced to knockout stage
3	Tufts	2	0	0	2	2	6	−4	0	Consolation

Scores

9:45am CST	Texas	3–0	Tufts	Field 5
Thu, November 20		Report		Stadium: Mike Rose Soccer Complex; Memphis, Tennessee

3:00pm CST	Tufts	2–3	Illinois	Field 5
Thu, November 20		Report		Stadium: Mike Rose Soccer Complex; Memphis, Tennessee

8:15pm CST	Illinois	2–1	Texas	Field 5
Thu, November 20		Report		Stadium: Mike Rose Soccer Complex; Memphis, Tennessee

=== Women's championship ===
Group A
Pos	Team	Pld	W	D	L	GF	GA	GD	Pts	Qualification
1	Texas A&M	2	1	1	0	2	1	+1	4	Advanced to knockout stage
2	Virginia	2	1	1	0	1	0	+1	4	Advanced to knockout stage
3	Southern Cal (USC)	2	0	0	2	1	3	−2	0	Consolation

Scores

8:00am CST	Texas A&M	2–1	USC	Field 6
Thu, November 20		Report		Stadium: Mike Rose Soccer Complex; Memphis, Tennessee

1:15pm CST	USC	0–1	Virginia	Field 6
Thu, November 20		Report		Stadium: Mike Rose Soccer Complex; Memphis, Tennessee

6:30pm CST	Virginia	0–0	Texas A&M	Field 6
Thu, November 20		Report		Stadium: Mike Rose Soccer Complex; Memphis, Tennessee

Group B
Pos	Team	Pld	W	D	L	GF	GA	GD	Pts	Qualification
1	Miami (OH)	2	2	0	0	7	3	+4	6	Advanced to knockout stage
2	Colorado	2	1	0	1	4	6	−2	3	Advanced to knockout stage
3	Florida	2	0	0	2	4	6	−2	0	Consolation

Scores

8:00am CST	Miami (OH)	3–2	Florida	Field 7
Thu, November 20		Report		Stadium: Mike Rose Soccer Complex; Memphis, Tennessee

1:15pm CST	Florida	2–3	Colorado	Field 7
Thu, November 20		Report		Stadium: Mike Rose Soccer Complex; Memphis, Tennessee

6:30pm CST	Colorado	1–4	Miami (OH)	Field 7
Thu, November 20		Report		Stadium: Mike Rose Soccer Complex; Memphis, Tennessee

Group C
Pos	Team	Pld	W	D	L	GF	GA	GD	Pts	Qualification
1	Oregon	2	0	2	0	4	4	0	2	Advanced to knockout stage
2	Kansas	2	0	2	0	3	3	0	2	Advanced to knockout stage
3	Pittsburgh	2	0	2	0	1	1	0	2	Consolation

Scores

8:00am CST	Oregon	3–3	Kansas	Field 8
Thu, November 20		Report		Stadium: Mike Rose Soccer Complex; Memphis, Tennessee

1:15pm CST	Kansas	0–0	Pittsburgh	Field 8
Thu, November 20		Report		Stadium: Mike Rose Soccer Complex; Memphis, Tennessee

6:30pm CST	Pittsburgh	1–1	Oregon	Field 8
Thu, November 20		Report		Stadium: Mike Rose Soccer Complex; Memphis, Tennessee

Group D
Pos	Team	Pld	W	D	L	GF	GA	GD	Pts	Qualification
1	Illinois	2	1	0	1	3	2	+1	3	Advanced to knockout stage
2	Delaware	2	1	0	1	4	3	+1	3	Advanced to knockout stage
3	Cal State Northridge	2	1	0	1	1	3	−2	3	Consolation

Scores

8:00am CST	Delaware	1–3	Illinois	Field 9
Thu, November 20		Report		Stadium: Mike Rose Soccer Complex; Memphis, Tennessee

1:15pm CST	Illinois	0–1	Cal State Northridge	Field 9
Thu, November 20		Report		Stadium: Mike Rose Soccer Complex; Memphis, Tennessee

6:30pm CST	Cal State Northridge	0–3	Delaware	Field 9
Thu, November 20		Report		Stadium: Mike Rose Soccer Complex; Memphis, Tennessee

Group E
Pos	Team	Pld	W	D	L	GF	GA	GD	Pts	Qualification
1	UC Davis	2	1	1	0	2	0	+2	4	Advanced to knockout stage
2	Colorado Mines	2	1	0	1	1	2	−1	3	Advanced to knockout stage
3	NC State	2	0	1	1	0	1	−1	1	Consolation

Scores

9:45am CST	NC State	0–1	Colorado Mines	Field 6
Thu, November 20		Report		Stadium: Mike Rose Soccer Complex; Memphis, Tennessee

3:00pm CST	Colorado Mines	0–2	UC Davis	Field 6
Thu, November 20		Report		Stadium: Mike Rose Soccer Complex; Memphis, Tennessee

8:15pm CST	UC Davis	0–0	NC State	Field 6
Thu, November 20		Report		Stadium: Mike Rose Soccer Complex; Memphis, Tennessee

Group F
Pos	Team	Pld	W	D	L	GF	GA	GD	Pts	Qualification
1	Michigan State	2	2	0	0	2	0	+2	6	Advanced to knockout stage
2	North Carolina	2	0	1	1	0	1	−1	1	Advanced to knockout stage
3	Cornell	2	0	1	1	0	1	−1	1	Consolation

Scores

9:45am CST	North Carolina	0–0	Cornell	Field 7
Thu, November 20		Report		Stadium: Mike Rose Soccer Complex; Memphis, Tennessee

3:00pm CST	Cornell	0–1	Michigan State	Field 7
Thu, November 20		Report		Stadium: Mike Rose Soccer Complex; Memphis, Tennessee

8:15pm CST	Michigan State	1–0	North Carolina	Field 7
Thu, November 20		Report		Stadium: Mike Rose Soccer Complex; Memphis, Tennessee

9:30am CST	North Carolina	4–3; Kicks from the mark	Cornell	Field 15
Sat, November 20		Report		Stadium: Mike Rose Soccer Complex; Memphis, Tennessee

Group G
Pos	Team	Pld	W	D	L	GF	GA	GD	Pts	Qualification
1	Colorado State	2	2	0	0	3	1	+2	6	Advanced to knockout stage
2	Texas	2	1	0	1	5	2	+3	3	Advanced to knockout stage
3	Florida State	2	0	0	2	0	5	−5	0	Consolation

Scores

9:45am CST	Colorado State	1–0	Florida State	Field 8
Thu, November 20		Report		Stadium: Mike Rose Soccer Complex; Memphis, Tennessee

3:00pm CST	Florida State	0–4	Texas	Field 8
Thu, November 20		Report		Stadium: Mike Rose Soccer Complex; Memphis, Tennessee

8:15pm CST	Texas	1–2	Colorado State	Field 8
Thu, November 20		Report		Stadium: Mike Rose Soccer Complex; Memphis, Tennessee

Group H
Pos	Team	Pld	W	D	L	GF	GA	GD	Pts	Qualification
1	UC-Santa Barbara	2	2	0	0	3	1	+2	6	Advanced to knockout stage
2	Ohio State	2	1	0	1	2	1	+1	3	Advanced to knockout stage
3	Penn State	2	0	0	2	1	4	−3	0	Consolation

Scores

9:45am CST	Ohio State	0–1	UCSB	Field 9
Thu, November 20		Report		Stadium: Mike Rose Soccer Complex; Memphis, Tennessee

3:00pm CST	UCSB	2–1	Penn State	Field 9
Thu, November 20		Report		Stadium: Mike Rose Soccer Complex; Memphis, Tennessee

8:15pm CST	Penn State	0–2	Ohio State	Field 9
Thu, November 20		Report		Stadium: Mike Rose Soccer Complex; Memphis, Tennessee

=== Men's open ===
Group A
Pos	Team	Pld	W	D	L	GF	GA	GD	Pts	Qualification
1	Northeastern	3	3	0	0	8	1	+7	9	Advanced to knockout stage
2	Missouri	3	2	0	1	4	3	+1	6	
3	UW Milwaukee	3	1	0	2	3	6	−3	3	
4	Utah Valley	3	0	0	3	1	6	−5	0	

Scores

8:00am CST	Missouri	1–0	Utah Valley	Field 12
Thu, November 20		Report		Stadium: Mike Rose Soccer Complex; Memphis, Tennessee

8:00am CST	Northeastern	3–0	UW Milwaukee	Field 13
Thu, November 20		Report		Stadium: Mike Rose Soccer Complex; Memphis, Tennessee

3:00pm CST	UW Milwaukee	1–2	Missouri	Field 12
Thu, November 20		Report		Stadium: Mike Rose Soccer Complex; Memphis, Tennessee

3:00pm CST	Utah Valley	0–3	Northeastern	Field 13
Thu, November 20		Report		Stadium: Mike Rose Soccer Complex; Memphis, Tennessee

8:00am CST	Missouri	1–2	Northeastern	Field 12
Fri, November 21		Report		Stadium: Mike Rose Soccer Complex; Memphis, Tennessee

8:00am CST	UW Milwaukee	2–1	Utah Valley	Field 13
Fri, November 21		Report		Stadium: Mike Rose Soccer Complex; Memphis, Tennessee

Group B
Pos	Team	Pld	W	D	L	GF	GA	GD	Pts	Qualification
1	Texas Tech	2	1	1	0	6	1	+6	7	Advanced to knockout stage
2	JMU	2	0	2	0	1	1	+1	5	
3	Illinois “B”	2	0	1	1	2	7	−4	4	
4	Cornell	Did not attend (weather), all teams given 3 points and +1 GD								

Scores

8:00am CST	JMU	1–1	Illinois “B”	Field 14
Thu, November 20		Report		Stadium: Mike Rose Soccer Complex; Memphis, Tennessee

3:00pm CST	Illinois “B”	1–6	Texas Tech	Field 15
Thu, November 20		Report		Stadium: Mike Rose Soccer Complex; Memphis, Tennessee

8:00am CST	JMU	0–0	Texas Tech	Field 14
Fri, November 21		Report		Stadium: Mike Rose Soccer Complex; Memphis, Tennessee

Group C
Pos	Team	Pld	W	D	L	GF	GA	GD	Pts	Qualification
1	UCF	3	2	1	0	5	1	+4	7	Advanced to knockout stage
2	UC-Berkeley	3	2	1	0	3	0	+3	7	Advanced to knockout stage
3	George Mason	3	0	1	2	1	3	−2	1	
4	Texas “B”	3	0	1	2	2	7	−5	1	

Scores

8:00am CST	UC Berkeley	1–0	George Mason	Field 16
Thu, November 20		Report		Stadium: Mike Rose Soccer Complex; Memphis, Tennessee

8:00am CST	UCF	4–1	Texas “B”	Field 17
Thu, November 20		Report		Stadium: Mike Rose Soccer Complex; Memphis, Tennessee

3:00pm CST	Texas “B”	0–2	UC Berkeley	Field 16
Thu, November 20		Report		Stadium: Mike Rose Soccer Complex; Memphis, Tennessee

3:00pm CST	George Mason	0–1	UCF	Field 17
Thu, November 20		Report		Stadium: Mike Rose Soccer Complex; Memphis, Tennessee

8:00am CST	UC Berkeley	0–0	UCF	Field 16
Fri, November 21		Report		Stadium: Mike Rose Soccer Complex; Memphis, Tennessee

8:00am CST	Texas “B”	1–1	George Mason	Field 17
Fri, November 21		Report		Stadium: Mike Rose Soccer Complex; Memphis, Tennessee

Group D
Pos	Team	Pld	W	D	L	GF	GA	GD	Pts	Qualification
1	Arkansas	3	2	1	0	6	1	+5	7	Advanced to knockout stage
2	Oregon	3	2	0	1	8	1	+5 (Note: Actual GD differs because the max GD for any one game is ±5, which came into effect when Oregon beat Colorado Springs 7–0)	6	Advanced to knockout stage
3	Boston College	3	1	1	1	5	3	+2	4	
4	Colorado Springs	3	0	0	3	1	15	−12	0	

Scores

9:45am CST	Boston College	0–1	Oregon	Field 12
Thu, November 20		Report		Stadium: Mike Rose Soccer Complex; Memphis, Tennessee

9:45am CST	Arkansas	4–0	Colorado Springs”	Field 13
Thu, November 20		Report		Stadium: Mike Rose Soccer Complex; Memphis, Tennessee

4:45pm CST	Colorado Springs	1–4	Boston College	Field 12
Thu, November 20		Report		Stadium: Mike Rose Soccer Complex; Memphis, Tennessee

4:45pm CST	Oregon	0–1	Arkansas	Field 13
Thu, November 20		Report		Stadium: Mike Rose Soccer Complex; Memphis, Tennessee

10:00am CST	Boston College	1–1	Arkansas	Field 12
Fri, November 21		Report		Stadium: Mike Rose Soccer Complex; Memphis, Tennessee

10:00am CST	Colorado Springs	0–7	Oregon	Field 13
Fri, November 21		Report		Stadium: Mike Rose Soccer Complex; Memphis, Tennessee

Group E
Pos	Team	Pld	W	D	L	GF	GA	GD	Pts	Qualification
1	UCLA	3	3	0	0	8	0	+8	9	Advanced to knockout stage
2	SUNY Cortland	3	1	1	1	2	2	0	4	
3	Mary Washington	3	1	1	1	3	6	−3	4	
4	Wash U	3	0	0	3	1	6	−5	0	

Scores

9:45am CST	UCLA	4–0	Mary Washington	Field 14
Thu, November 20		Report		Stadium: Mike Rose Soccer Complex; Memphis, Tennessee

9:45am CST	Wash U	0–1	SUNY Cortland	Field 15
Thu, November 20		Report		Stadium: Mike Rose Soccer Complex; Memphis, Tennessee

4:45pm CST	SUNY Cortland	0–1	UCLA	Field 14
Thu, November 20		Report		Stadium: Mike Rose Soccer Complex; Memphis, Tennessee

4:45pm CST	Mary Washington	2–1	Wash U	Field 15
Thu, November 20		Report		Stadium: Mike Rose Soccer Complex; Memphis, Tennessee

10:00am CST	UCLA	3–0	Wash U	Field 14
Fri, November 21		Report		Stadium: Mike Rose Soccer Complex; Memphis, Tennessee

10:00am CST	SUNY Cortland	1–1	Mary Washington	Field 15
Fri, November 21		Report		Stadium: Mike Rose Soccer Complex; Memphis, Tennessee

Group F
Pos	Team	Pld	W	D	L	GF	GA	GD	Pts	Qualification
1	UC Davis	3	3	0	0	6	0	+6	9	Advanced to knockout stage
2	Stony Brook	3	2	0	1	3	4	−1	6	
3	Miami (FL)	3	1	0	2	2	2	0	3	
4	Purdue	3	0	0	3	0	5	−5	0	

Scores

9:45am CST	UC Davis	1–0	Purdue	Field 16
Thu, November 20		Report		Stadium: Mike Rose Soccer Complex; Memphis, Tennessee

9:45am CST	Miami (FL)	0–1	Stony Brook	Field 17
Thu, November 20		Report		Stadium: Mike Rose Soccer Complex; Memphis, Tennessee

4:45pm CST	Stony Brook	0–4	UC Davis	Field 16
Thu, November 20		Report		Stadium: Mike Rose Soccer Complex; Memphis, Tennessee

4:45pm CST	Purdue	0–2	Miami (FL)	Field 17
Thu, November 20		Report		Stadium: Mike Rose Soccer Complex; Memphis, Tennessee

10:00am CST	UC Davis	1–0	Miami (FL)	Field 16
Fri, November 21		Report		Stadium: Mike Rose Soccer Complex; Memphis, Tennessee

10:00am CST	Stony Brook	2–0	Purdue	Field 17
Fri, November 21		Report		Stadium: Mike Rose Soccer Complex; Memphis, Tennessee

=== Women's open ===
Group A
Pos	Team	Pld	W	D	L	GF	GA	GD	Pts	Qualification
1	JMU	3	2	1	0	7	2	+5	7	Advanced to knockout stage
2	Vermont	3	1	1	1	2	4	−2	4	
3	Texas Tech	3	1	0	2	1	3	−2	3	
4	Penn	3	0	2	1	1	2	−1	2	

Scores

11:30am CST	JMU	4–1	Vermont	Field 12
Thu, November 20		Report		Stadium: Mike Rose Soccer Complex; Memphis, Tennessee

11:30am CST	Penn	0–1	Texas Tech	Field 13
Thu, November 20		Report		Stadium: Mike Rose Soccer Complex; Memphis, Tennessee

6:30pm CST	Texas Tech	0–2	JMU	Field 12
Thu, November 20		Report		Stadium: Mike Rose Soccer Complex; Memphis, Tennessee

6:30pm CST	Vermont	0–0	Penn	Field 13
Thu, November 20		Report		Stadium: Mike Rose Soccer Complex; Memphis, Tennessee

12:00pm CST	JMU	1–1	Penn	Field 12
Fri, November 21		Report		Stadium: Mike Rose Soccer Complex; Memphis, Tennessee

12:00pm CST	Texas Tech	0–1	Vermont	Field 13
Fri, November 21		Report		Stadium: Mike Rose Soccer Complex; Memphis, Tennessee

Group B
Pos	Team	Pld	W	D	L	GF	GA	GD	Pts	Qualification
1	Colorado “Black”	3	2	1	0	4	0	+4	7	Advanced to knockout stage
2	UCF	3	1	2	0	1	0	+1	5	
3	Missouri	3	0	2	1	0	2	−2	2	
4	Georgetown	3	0	1	2	0	3	−3	1	

Scores

11:30am CST	Missouri	0–0	Georgetown	Field 14
Thu, November 20		Report		Stadium: Mike Rose Soccer Complex; Memphis, Tennessee

11:30am CST	Colorado “Black”	0–0	UCF	Field 15
Thu, November 20		Report		Stadium: Mike Rose Soccer Complex; Memphis, Tennessee

6:30pm CST	UCF	0–0	Missouri	Field 14
Thu, November 20		Report		Stadium: Mike Rose Soccer Complex; Memphis, Tennessee

6:30pm CST	Georgetown	0–2	Colorado “Black”	Field 15
Thu, November 20		Report		Stadium: Mike Rose Soccer Complex; Memphis, Tennessee

12:00pm CST	Missouri	0–2	Colorado “Black”	Field 14
Fri, November 21		Report		Stadium: Mike Rose Soccer Complex; Memphis, Tennessee

12:00pm CST	UCF	1–0	Georgetown	Field 15
Fri, November 21		Report		Stadium: Mike Rose Soccer Complex; Memphis, Tennessee

Group C
Pos	Team	Pld	W	D	L	GF	GA	GD	Pts	Qualification
1	Virginia Tech	3	3	0	0	9	4	+5	9	Advanced to knockout stage
2	Fordham	3	2	0	1	7	3	+4	6	Advanced to knockout stage
3	Wash U	3	1	0	2	4	6	−2	3	
4	Colorado Mesa	3	0	0	3	1	8	−7	0	

Scores

11:30am CST	Virginia Tech	3–1	Colorado Mesa	Field 16
Thu, November 20		Report		Stadium: Mike Rose Soccer Complex; Memphis, Tennessee

11:30am CST	Wash U	0–3	Fordham	Field 17
Thu, November 20		Report		Stadium: Mike Rose Soccer Complex; Memphis, Tennessee

6:30pm CST	Fordham	2–3	Virginia Tech	Field 16
Thu, November 20		Report		Stadium: Mike Rose Soccer Complex; Memphis, Tennessee

6:30pm CST	Colorado Mesa	0–3	Wash U	Field 17
Thu, November 20		Report		Stadium: Mike Rose Soccer Complex; Memphis, Tennessee

12:00pm CST	Virginia Tech	3–1	Wash U	Field 16
Fri, November 21		Report		Stadium: Mike Rose Soccer Complex; Memphis, Tennessee

12:00pm CST	Fordham	2–0	Colorado Mesa	Field 17
Fri, November 21		Report		Stadium: Mike Rose Soccer Complex; Memphis, Tennessee

Group D
Pos	Team	Pld	W	D	L	GF	GA	GD	Pts	Qualification
1	Michigan	3	3	0	0	9	0	+9	9	Advanced to knockout stage
2	Northeastern	3	2	0	1	2	2	0	6	Advanced to knockout stage
3	Iowa	3	1	0	2	3	4	−1	3	
4	Mary Washington	3	0	0	3	0	8	−8	0	

Scores

1:15pm CST	Michigan	3–0	Iowa	Field 12
Thu, November 20		Report		Stadium: Mike Rose Soccer Complex; Memphis, Tennessee

1:15pm CST	Northeastern	1–0	Mary Washington	Field 13
Thu, November 20		Report		Stadium: Mike Rose Soccer Complex; Memphis, Tennessee

8:15pm CST	Mary Washington	0–4	Michigan	Field 12
Thu, November 20		Report		Stadium: Mike Rose Soccer Complex; Memphis, Tennessee

8:15pm CST	Iowa	0–1	Northeastern	Field 13
Thu, November 20		Report		Stadium: Mike Rose Soccer Complex; Memphis, Tennessee

2:00pm CST	Michigan	2–0	Northeastern	Field 12
Fri, November 21		Report		Stadium: Mike Rose Soccer Complex; Memphis, Tennessee

2:00pm CST	Mary Washington	0–3	Iowa	Field 13
Fri, November 21		Report		Stadium: Mike Rose Soccer Complex; Memphis, Tennessee

Group E
Pos	Team	Pld	W	D	L	GF	GA	GD	Pts	Qualification
1	San Diego State	3	3	0	0	10	1	+9	9	Advanced to knockout stage
2	UMass	3	1	1	1	6	3	+3	4	
3	Vanderbilt	3	1	1	1	5	5	0	4	
4	UW Milwaukee	3	0	0	3	1	13	−12	0	

Scores

1:15pm CST	San Diego State	2–1	UMass	Field 14
Thu, November 20		Report		Stadium: Mike Rose Soccer Complex; Memphis, Tennessee

1:15pm CST	Vanderbilt	4–1	UW Milwaukee	Field 15
Thu, November 20		Report		Stadium: Mike Rose Soccer Complex; Memphis, Tennessee

8:15pm CST	UW Milwaukee	0–5	San Diego State	Field 14
Thu, November 20		Report		Stadium: Mike Rose Soccer Complex; Memphis, Tennessee

8:15pm CST	UMass	1–1	Vanderbilt	Field 15
Thu, November 20		Report		Stadium: Mike Rose Soccer Complex; Memphis, Tennessee

2:00pm CST	San Diego State	3–0	Vanderbilt	Field 14
Fri, November 21		Report		Stadium: Mike Rose Soccer Complex; Memphis, Tennessee

2:00pm CST	UW Milwaukee	0–4	UMass	Field 15
Fri, November 21		Report		Stadium: Mike Rose Soccer Complex; Memphis, Tennessee

Group F
Pos	Team	Pld	W	D	L	GF	GA	GD	Pts	Qualification
1	UCLA	3	2	1	0	8	2	+6	7	Advanced to knockout stage
2	Miami (FL)	3	1	1	1	4	6	−2	4	
3	UConn	3	1	1	1	3	4	−1	4	
4	Iowa State	3	0	1	2	0	3	−3	1	

Scores

1:15pm CST	UCLA	1–1	UConn	Field 16
Thu, November 20		Report		Stadium: Mike Rose Soccer Complex; Memphis, Tennessee

1:15pm CST	Miami (FL)	0–0	Iowa State	Field 17
Thu, November 20		Report		Stadium: Mike Rose Soccer Complex; Memphis, Tennessee

8:15pm CST	Iowa State	0–2	UCLA	Field 16
Thu, November 20		Report		Stadium: Mike Rose Soccer Complex; Memphis, Tennessee

8:15pm CST	UConn	1–3	Miami (FL)	Field 17
Thu, November 20		Report		Stadium: Mike Rose Soccer Complex; Memphis, Tennessee

2:00pm CST	UCLA	5–1	Miami (FL)	Field 16
Fri, November 21		Report		Stadium: Mike Rose Soccer Complex; Memphis, Tennessee

2:00pm CST	Iowa State	0–1	UConn	Field 17
Fri, November 21		Report		Stadium: Mike Rose Soccer Complex; Memphis, Tennessee

== Tournament bracket ==
=== Men's championship ===
Sweet 16
Fri • 10:00am • Field 2
Michigan State (pen.)	3 (4)
Virginia	3 (3)
Fri • 10:00am • Field 3
Illinois	1 (1)
UConn (pen.)	1 (2)
Fri • 10:00am • Field 4
Cincinnati	3
Utah State	0
Fri • 10:00am • Field 5
San Diego State	1
Colorado State	0
Fri • 12:00pm • Field 2
Cal Poly	0
SMU	1
Fri • 12:00pm • Field 3
Florida State	0
Texas A&M	5
Fri • 12:00pm • Field 4
Virginia Tech (pen.)	2 (4)
Texas	2 (2)
Fri • 12:00pm • Field 5
Ohio State	2
Florida	1

Quarterfinals
Fri • 4:00pm • Field 2
Michigan State	3
UConn	1
Fri • 4:00pm • Field 4
Cincinnati	0
San Diego State	2
Fri • 6:00pm • Field 2
SMU	1
Texas A&M	3
Fri • 6:00pm • Field 4
Virginia Tech	0
Ohio State	1

Semifinals
Sat • 10:00am • Field 2
Michigan State	0
San Diego State	1
Sat • 10:00am • Field 4
Texas A&M	1
Ohio State	4

Final
Sat • 5:00pm • Stadium
San Diego State	0
Ohio State (a.e.t.)	1

==== Men's consolation ====
Quarterfinals
Fri • 4:00pm • Field 14
Rice (pen.)	1 (4)
Marquette	1 (2)
Fri • 4:00pm • Field 17
Delaware	3
Iowa State	0
Fri • 6:00pm • Field 14
UMass	1
Colorado Mines	3
Fri • 6:00pm • Field 17
Tufts	1 (1)
UTEP (pen.)	1 (3)

Semifinals
Sat • 8:00am • Field 6
Rice	2
Delaware	5
Sat • 8:00am • Field 8
Colorado Mines	3
UTEP	0

Final
Sat • 1:00pm • Field 5
Delaware	1 (2)
Colorado Mines (pen.)	1 (4)

=== Women's championship ===
Sweet 16
Fri • 10:00am • Field 6
Texas A&M	0 (1)
Delaware (pen.)	0 (3)
Fri • 10:00am • Field 7
UC-Santa Barbara	1
Colorado Mines	0
Fri • 10:00am • Field 8
Colorado State	1
North Carolina	2
Fri • 10:00am • Field 9
Miami (OH)	2
Kansas	1
Fri • 12:00pm • Field 6
Oregon	0
Colorado	2
Fri • 12:00pm • Field 7
Michigan State	0
Texas	1
Fri • 12:00pm • Field 8
UC Davis	0
Ohio State	1
Fri • 12:00pm • Field 9
Illinois (a.e.t.)	2
Virginia	1

Quarterfinals
Fri • 4:00pm • Field 3
Delaware	0
UC-Santa Barbara	1
Fri • 4:00pm • Field 5
North Carolina	0
Miami (OH)	2
Fri • 6:00pm • Field 3
Colorado	0
Texas	1
Fri • 6:00pm • Field 5
Ohio State	3
Illinois	1

Semifinals
Sat • 10:00am • Field 3
UC-Santa Barbara	0 (3)
Miami (OH) (pen.)	0 (4)
Sat • 10:00am • Field 5
Texas	0
Ohio State (a.e.t.)	1

Final
Sat • 3:00pm • Stadium
Miami (OH)	0
Ohio State	2

==== Women's consolation ====
Quarterfinals
Fri • 4:00pm • Field 12
USC	3
NC State	2
Fri • 4:00pm • Field 13
Cornell	0
Florida	3
Fri • 6:00pm • Field 12
Pitt	0
Florida State	1
Fri • 6:00pm • Field 13
Penn State	1
Cal State Northridge	0

Semifinals
Sat • 8:00am • Field 7
USC	1
Florida	3
Sat • 8:00am • Field 9
Florida State	0 (2)
Penn State (pen.)	0 (4)

Final
Sat • 1:00pm • Field 3
Florida	1
Penn State	0

=== Men's open ===
Quarterfinals
Fri • 4:00pm • Field 6
Arkansas	0
UC-Davis	2
Fri • 4:00pm • Field 7
UCLA	0 (1)
UC Berkeley (pen.)	0 (3)
Fri • 4:00pm • Field 8
UCF	1
Texas Tech	0
Fri • 4:00pm • Field 9
Northeastern	1
Oregon	2

Semifinals
Sat • 8:00am • Field 2
UC-Davis	0 (3)
UC Berkeley (pen.)	0 (4)
Sat • 8:00am • Field 4
UCF	3
Oregon	0

Final
Sat • 1:00pm • Field 4
UC Berkeley	2
UCF	1

=== Women's open ===
Quarterfinals
Fri • 8:00pm • Field 2
Michigan	2
JMU	0
Fri • 8:00pm • Field 3
San Diego State	1
Fordham	3
Fri • 8:00pm • Field 4
Virginia Tech	4
Colorado "Black"	2
Fri • 8:00pm • Field 5
UCLA	1
Northeastern	0

Semifinals
Sat • 8:00am • Field 3
Michigan	3
Fordham	0
Sat • 8:00am • Field 5
Virginia Tech	1
UCLA (a.e.t.)	2

Final
Sat • 1:00pm • Field 2
Michigan	2
UCLA	0
