= 2012 NIRSA National Soccer Championship =

- League: NIRSA
- Sport: Soccer
- Site: Mike Rose Soccer Complex; Memphis, Tennessee
- Duration: November 15–17, 2012
- Teams: 24
- Results: Official Results

Men's Championship Division
- Score: 0–0 (a.e.t.); 4–1 (pen.)
- Champion: Michigan State (1st title, 1st title game)
- Runners-up: Weber State (4th title game)
- Season MVP: Matt Kaminski (Michigan State)

Women's Championship Division
- Score: 2–1 (a.e.t.)
- Champion: Michigan State (1st title, 1st title game)
- Runners-up: UC-Santa Barbara (8th title game)
- Season MVP: Maddie Lucci (Michigan State)

Men's Open Division
- Score: 1–1 (a.e.t.); 4–3 (pen.)
- Champion: San Diego State (1st title, 2nd title game)
- Runners-up: UC-Berkeley (3rd title game)
- Season MVP: Berrick Rastok (San Diego State)

Women's Open Division
- Score: 0–0 (a.e.t.); 3–1 (pen.)
- Champion: JMU (2nd title, 2nd title game)
- Runners-up: Illinois (2nd title game)
- Top seed: Saundra Bailey (JMU)

NIRSA national soccer championships seasons
- ← 2011 2013 →

The 2012 NIRSA national soccer championship was the 19th NIRSA National Soccer Championships, the annual national championships for United States-based, collegiate club soccer teams organized by NIRSA. It took place at Mike Rose Soccer Complex in Memphis, Tennessee from Thursday, November 15 to Saturday, November 17, 2012. All four finals required extra time and three required a penalty shootout.

== Overview ==
=== Men's championship ===
In the finals, defending champions, Weber State, would return to face finals debutants Michigan State. Prior to this, in the group stage, both teams would top their group with Weber State defeating Grand Valley State 1–0 in their opener then Wash U 3–0 while Michigan State would defeat Colorado Mines 3–0 then LSU 4–0.

In the knockout round, both teams would concede their first goal of the tournament in 1–1 draws in the round of 16 and would require extra time with Weber State defeating USC 2–1 with a golden goal and Michigan State needing penalty kicks over Georgia that they won 5–4. Following this, Weber State would beat Texas A&M 2–0 in the quarterfinals while Michigan State would have a rematch with Region III tournament champion, Illinois, who defeated them via penalty kicks in the semifinals of the regional tournament. In this matchup, Michigan State would win via an own goal late in the match to advance to the semifinals. In the semifinals, Weber State would be tied 0–0 after regulation and overtime with regional opponent Cal Poly but would defeat them 4–3 in penalties while Michigan State would beat Wash U 3–0 to advance to their first finals.

In the finals, the game would be deadlocked at 0–0 after regular time and extra time, meaning the game would go into a penalty shootout, the second for both teams this tournament. Michigan State would kick first. Both teams would score their first attempts but in the second and third rounds, Michigan State scored but Weber State's attempts would be saved, leaving Michigan State with a 3–1 advantage. Max Washko of Michigan State would score to open the fourth round, ending the game at 4–1 on PKs and giving Michigan State their first national championship while preventing the Weber State repeat. First penalty kick taker and captain for Michigan State, Matt Kaminski, would be named men's championship MVP.

=== Women's championship ===
In the finals, the winner of all 5 previous titles, UC-Santa Barbara, were looking to claim their 6th straight title and 7th overall against finals debutants Michigan State. Prior to this, in the group stage, UC-Santa Barbara would defeat Delaware 2–0 then Virginia Tech 4–0 while Michigan State would defeat 2007 runners-up, San Diego State, 2–0 then would lose to reigning semifinalist and 2010 runners-up, Texas, 1–3 but would still finish second in their group to advance to the knockout round.

In the knockout round, UC-Santa Barbara this would defeat Baylor in the round of 16 and Pitt in the quarterfinals, both by a score of 1–0, while Michigan State would defeat reigning runners-up Cal Poly in the round of 16 then 4-time champion Colorado in the quarterfinals, both by a score of 2–1. In the semifinals, UC-Santa Barbara would face Texas in a rematch of the 2010 national championship game and just like the game in 2010, the game would require a penalty shootout with UC-Santa Barbara once again being victorious with a 4–2 win to advance to their sixth straight national title game, the longest national final appearance streak of all time. Meanwhile, Michigan State would defeat Virginia 4–0 in the semifinals to advance to their first national title game.

In the finals, Samantha Pace of Michigan State would open the scoring with a goal two minutes into the second half, but Nadia Zadeh of UC-Santa Barbara would even the score in the 61st minute. The game would remain tied at the end of regulation, meaning 15 minutes of extra time were to be played. Three minutes prior to the conclusion of extra time, eventual women's championship MVP Maddie Lucci of Michigan State would score the sudden-victory goal, giving Michigan State their first national title and ending UC-Santa Barbara's streak of five straight national titles and 21-straight national championship wins.

=== Men's open ===
In the finals, 2008 open champions UC-Berkeley would face 2009 open runners-up San Diego State. After a 1–1 score line after regulation and extra time, the game would go into a penalty shootout. San Diego State would go on to win 4–3 and claim their first open national championship. San Diego State's Berrick Rastok would go on to be named men's open division MVP.

=== Women's open ===
In the finals, 2009 open champions JMU would face 2010 open champions Illinois in both of the clubs' second finals appearance. The game would remain scoreless after regulation and extra time, meaning a penalty shootout would be required to name a champion. JMU would win 3–1 and claim their second national title in 4 years. JMU's Saundra Bailey would be named women's open's MVP.

== Format ==
The competition consisted of 96 teams: 48 men's teams and 48 women's teams. Each of these divisions were further divided into two 24-team divisions: the championship and open. The championship division divided teams into eight groups of three while the open division divided teams into six groups of four, both engaging in a round-robin tournament that determined teams able to advance to a knockout stage. Pool play games were two 40-minute halves, separated by a seven-minute halftime and utilized the three points for a win system. In the championship division, the two highest ranked teams from each group advanced to their knockout stage, with the third placed team advancing to a consolation bracket. In the open division, the top team from each group as well as the two best second placed teams advanced to their knockout stage.

Tie-breaking criteria for group play
The ranking of teams in each group was based on the following criteria in order:
1. Highest number of points
2. Winner of head-to-head competition
3. Greatest goal difference
  - Maximum ± 5 goal difference per match
4. Most goals scored
5. Most shutouts

In a tie breaking scenario involving more than 2 teams, the tiebreaker procedure would begin. If one team is identified as different and both remaining teams are still tied, the tie breaker procedure is restarted.

If a tie still remained after the first 5 criteria, the following was used to break a tie:

1. NCAA kicks from the mark
  - If there was a three-way tie, a coin-flip would be conducted. The two teams that chose the same outcome would compete in kicks from the mark between each other. The winner would compete with the last remaining team in kicks from the mark
  - If there's a four-way tie, a drawing of lots would be conducted (only could occur in open division)

Knockout stage games also consisted of two 40-minute halves. The round of 16 and quarterfinals were separated by a seven-minute halftime while the semifinals and finals had a ten-minute halftime. Knockout stage games needed to declare a winner. If a knockout-stage game was tied at the end of regulation, overtime would begin. Overtime consisted of one, 15-minute, golden-goal period. If still tied after overtime, kicks from the mark would determine the winner.

== Qualification and selections ==
Each of the six regions received three automatic bids for both the men's and women's championship that they awarded to its members. The final six bids were considered "at-large", and were given out by NIRSA to teams, typically based on their regional tournament results and RPI.

The 48 remaining teams participated in the open division, chosen on a first-come first-serve basis with a max of 4 teams per region being allowed in initially, with all teams applying after this being placed on the waitlist. Registration was online on September 25, 2012 at 8am PST.

=== Men's championship ===
Automatic bids
Region	Team	Appearance	Last Bid
I	Navy	Did not participate	
I	Harvard	1st	Never
I	Penn State	12th	2011
II	Florida	7th	2011
II	Georgia	7th	2011
II	Virginia Tech	5th	2006
III	Illinois	10th	2009
III	Michigan State	6th	2011
III	Ohio State	8th	2011
IV	TCU	1st	Never
IV	LSU	2nd	1999
IV	Wash U	1st	Never
V	Colorado	13th	2011
V	Colorado Mines	2nd	2010
V	Denver	1st	Never
VI	Arizona	11th	2011
VI	Cal Poly	4th	2011
VI	Weber State	12th	2011

At-large bids
Region	Team	Appearance	Last Bid
II	Auburn	4th	2007
III	Grand Valley State	3rd	1996
IV	Texas A&M	13th	2011
IV	Texas	14th	2011
V	Minnesota	11th	2011
VI	UCLA	4th	2010
VI	Southern Cal	2nd	2008

=== Women's championship ===
Automatic bids
Region	Team	Appearance	Last Bid
I	Cornell	7th	2011
I	Boston College	3rd	2008
I	Pitt	3rd	2011
I	College of New Jersey	3rd	2010
II	North Carolina	9th	2011
II	Georgia	2nd	2001
II	Virginia Tech	12th	2011
III	Ohio State	12th	2011
III	Indiana	4th	2011
III	Michigan State	10th	2011
IV	Texas	13th	2011
IV	Baylor	8th	2010
IV	Kansas	4th	1998
V	Colorado	18th	2011
V	Colorado State	16th	2011
VI	UC-Santa Barbara	12th	2011
VI	Cal Poly	3rd	2011
VI	UC-Berkeley	3rd	2010

At-large bids
Region	Team	Appearance	Last Bid
I	Delaware	10th	2011
II	Virginia	7th	2011
III	Michigan	14th	2011
III	Miami (OH)	12th	2004
IV	Texas A&M	13th	2010
VI	San Diego State	10th	2011

=== Men's open ===
Region	Num	Team
I	5	Northeastern, Penn, SUNY Cortland, UConn, Villanova
II	4	JMU, Miami (FL), NC State, Samford
III	1	Cincinnati
IV	7	Arkansas, Baylor, Kansas, Missouri, Sam Houston State, Texas "B", Texas Tech
V	7	Colorado "Black", Colorado State, Iowa State, Minnesota, Cal State Fullerton, San Diego State, UC-Berkeley

=== Women's open ===
Region	Num	Team
I	4	Penn, Penn State, UConn, Villanova
II	6	JMU, Miami (FL), MTSU, Old Dominion, Towson, Vanderbilt
III	2	Illinois, UW-Milwaukee
IV	4	Missouri, Texas "B", Texas State-San Marcos, Wash U, ~~Texas Tech~~ (did not attend)
V	3	Colorado "Black", Colorado Mines, Iowa State
VI	4	Arizona, Oregon, Salt Lake CC, UCLA

== Group stage ==
=== Men's championship ===
Group A
Pos	Team	Pld	W	D	L	GF	GA	GD	Pts	Qualification
1	Weber State	2	2	0	0	4	0	+4	6	Advanced to knockout stage
2	Wash U	2	1	0	1	2	4	−2	3	Advanced to knockout stage
3	Grand Valley State	2	0	0	2	1	3	−2	0	Consolation

Scores

8:00am CST	Weber State	1–0	Grand Valley State	Field 10
Thu, November 15		Report		Stadium: Mike Rose Soccer Complex; Memphis, Tennessee

1:15pm CST	Grand Valley State	1–2	Wash U	Field 10
Thu, November 15		Report		Stadium: Mike Rose Soccer Complex; Memphis, Tennessee

6:30pm CST	Wash U	0–3	Weber State	Field 10
Thu, November 15		Report		Stadium: Mike Rose Soccer Complex; Memphis, Tennessee

Group B
Pos	Team	Pld	W	D	L	GF	GA	GD	Pts	Qualification
1	Virginia Tech	2	1	1	0	3	0	+3	4	Advanced to knockout stage
2	Texas	2	1	1	0	3	1	+2	4	Advanced to knockout stage
3	Minnesota	2	0	0	2	1	6	−5	0	Consolation

Scores

8:00am CST	Virginia Tech	3–0	Minnesota	Field 11
Thu, November 15		Report		Stadium: Mike Rose Soccer Complex; Memphis, Tennessee

1:15pm CST	Minnesota	1–3	Texas	Field 11
Thu, November 15		Report		Stadium: Mike Rose Soccer Complex; Memphis, Tennessee

6:30pm CST	Texas	0–0	Virginia Tech	Field 11
Thu, November 15		Report		Stadium: Mike Rose Soccer Complex; Memphis, Tennessee

Group C
Pos	Team	Pld	W	D	L	GF	GA	GD	Pts	Qualification
1	Illinois	2	1	1	0	2	1	+1	4	Advanced to knockout stage
2	Harvard	2	1	1	0	1	0	+1	4	Advanced to knockout stage
3	Arizona	2	0	0	2	1	3	−2	0	Consolation

Scores

8:00am CST	Illinois	2–1	Arizona	Field 12
Thu, November 15		Report		Stadium: Mike Rose Soccer Complex; Memphis, Tennessee

1:15pm CST	Arizona	0–1	Harvard	Field 12
Thu, November 15		Report		Stadium: Mike Rose Soccer Complex; Memphis, Tennessee

6:30pm CST	Harvard	0–0	Illinois	Field 12
Thu, November 15		Report		Stadium: Mike Rose Soccer Complex; Memphis, Tennessee

Group D
Pos	Team	Pld	W	D	L	GF	GA	GD	Pts	Qualification
1	Colorado	2	2	0	0	4	1	+3	6	Advanced to knockout stage
2	Southern Cal (USC)	2	0	1	1	4	5	−1	1	Advanced to knockout stage
3	Florida	2	0	1	1	3	5	−2	1	Consolation

Scores

8:00am CST	Colorado	2–1	USC	Field 13
Thu, November 15		Report		Stadium: Mike Rose Soccer Complex; Memphis, Tennessee

1:15pm CST	USC	3–3	Florida	Field 13
Thu, November 15		Report		Stadium: Mike Rose Soccer Complex; Memphis, Tennessee

6:30pm CST	Florida	0–2	Colorado “Gold	Field 13
Thu, November 15		Report		Stadium: Mike Rose Soccer Complex; Memphis, Tennessee

Group E
Pos	Team	Pld	W	D	L	GF	GA	GD	Pts	Qualification
1	Ohio State	2	1	1	0	4	3	+1	4	Advanced to knockout stage
2	Texas A&M	2	0	2	0	3	3	0	2	Advanced to knockout stage
3	Auburn	2	0	1	1	2	3	−1	1	Consolation

Scores

9:45am CST	Ohio State	2–2	Texas A&M	Field 10
Thu, November 15		Report		Stadium: Mike Rose Soccer Complex; Memphis, Tennessee

3:00pm CST	Texas A&M	1–1	Auburn	Field 10
Thu, November 15		Report		Stadium: Mike Rose Soccer Complex; Memphis, Tennessee

8:15pm CST	Auburn	1–2	Ohio State	Field 10
Thu, November 15		Report		Stadium: Mike Rose Soccer Complex; Memphis, Tennessee

Group F
Pos	Team	Pld	W	D	L	GF	GA	GD	Pts	Qualification
1	Michigan State	2	2	0	0	7	0	+7	6	Advanced to knockout stage
2	Colorado Mines	2	0	1	1	1	4	−3	1	Advanced to knockout stage
3	LSU	2	0	1	1	1	5	−4	1	Consolation

Scores

9:45am CST	LSU	1–1	Colorado Mines	Field 11
Thu, November 15		Report		Stadium: Mike Rose Soccer Complex; Memphis, Tennessee

3:00pm CST	Colorado Mines	0–3	Michigan State	Field 11
Thu, November 15		Report		Stadium: Mike Rose Soccer Complex; Memphis, Tennessee

8:15pm CST	Michigan State	4–0	LSU	Field 11
Thu, November 15		Report		Stadium: Mike Rose Soccer Complex; Memphis, Tennessee

Group G
Pos	Team	Pld	W	D	L	GF	GA	GD	Pts	Qualification
1	Cal Poly	2	2	0	0	5	0	+5	6	Advanced to knockout stage
2	Georgia	2	1	0	1	2	4	−2	3	Advanced to knockout stage
3	Denver	2	0	0	2	1	4	−3	0	Consolation

Scores

9:45am CST	Georgia	2–1	Denver	Field 12
Thu, November 15		Report		Stadium: Mike Rose Soccer Complex; Memphis, Tennessee

3:00pm CST	Denver	0–2	Cal Poly	Field 12
Thu, November 15		Report		Stadium: Mike Rose Soccer Complex; Memphis, Tennessee

8:15pm CST	Cal Poly	3–0	Georgia	Field 12
Thu, November 15		Report		Stadium: Mike Rose Soccer Complex; Memphis, Tennessee

Group H
Pos	Team	Pld	W	D	L	GF	GA	GD	Pts	Qualification
1	TCU	2	1	1	0	2	1	+1	4	Advanced to knockout stage
2	Penn State	2	0	2	0	1	1	0	2	Advanced to knockout stage
3	UCLA	2	0	1	1	0	1	−1	1	Consolation

Scores

9:45am CST	Penn State	0–0	UCLA	Field 13
Thu, November 15		Report		Stadium: Mike Rose Soccer Complex; Memphis, Tennessee

3:00pm CST	UCLA	0–1	TCU	Field 13
Thu, November 15		Report		Stadium: Mike Rose Soccer Complex; Memphis, Tennessee

8:15pm CST	TCU	1–1	Penn State	Field 13
Thu, November 15		Report		Stadium: Mike Rose Soccer Complex; Memphis, Tennessee

=== Women's championship ===
Group A
Pos	Team	Pld	W	D	L	GF	GA	GD	Pts	Qualification
1	Ohio State	2	2	0	0	6	1	+5	6	Advanced to knockout stage
2	Baylor	2	1	0	1	1	4	−3	3	Advanced to knockout stage
3	Cornell	2	0	0	2	1	3	−2	0	Consolation

Scores

8:00am CST	Ohio State	2–1	Cornell	Field 14
Thu, November 15		Report		Stadium: Mike Rose Soccer Complex; Memphis, Tennessee

1:15pm CST	Cornell	0–1	Baylor	Field 14
Thu, November 15		Report		Stadium: Mike Rose Soccer Complex; Memphis, Tennessee

6:30pm CST	Baylor	0–4	Ohio State	Field 14
Thu, November 15		Report		Stadium: Mike Rose Soccer Complex; Memphis, Tennessee

Group B
Pos	Team	Pld	W	D	L	GF	GA	GD	Pts	Qualification
1	Colorado	2	2	0	0	5	1	+4	6	Advanced to knockout stage
2	Kansas	2	1	0	1	2	4	−2	3	Advanced to knockout stage
3	Michigan	2	0	0	2	2	4	−2	0	Consolation

Scores

8:00am CST	Colorado	2–1	Michigan	Field 15
Thu, November 15		Report		Stadium: Mike Rose Soccer Complex; Memphis, Tennessee

1:15pm CST	Michigan	1–2	Kansas	Field 15
Thu, November 15		Report		Stadium: Mike Rose Soccer Complex; Memphis, Tennessee

6:30pm CST	Kansas	0–3	Colorado	Field 15
Thu, November 15		Report		Stadium: Mike Rose Soccer Complex; Memphis, Tennessee

Group C
Pos	Team	Pld	W	D	L	GF	GA	GD	Pts	Qualification
1	North Carolina	2	1	1	0	7	3	+4	4	Advanced to knockout stage
2	Texas A&M	2	1	0	1	3	5	−2	3	Advanced to knockout stage
3	Miami (OH)	2	0	1	1	2	4	−2	1	Consolation

Scores

8:00am CST	North Carolina	2–2	Miami U	Field 16
Thu, November 15		Report		Stadium: Mike Rose Soccer Complex; Memphis, Tennessee

1:15pm CST	Miami U	0–2	Texas A&M	Field 16
Thu, November 15		Report		Stadium: Mike Rose Soccer Complex; Memphis, Tennessee

6:30pm CST	Texas A&M	1–5	North Carolina	Field 16
Thu, November 15		Report		Stadium: Mike Rose Soccer Complex; Memphis, Tennessee

Group D
Pos	Team	Pld	W	D	L	GF	GA	GD	Pts	Qualification
1	UC Santa Barbara	2	2	0	0	6	0	+6	6	Advanced to knockout stage
2	Delaware	2	1	0	1	1	2	−1	3	Advanced to knockout stage
3	Virginia Tech	2	0	0	2	0	5	−5	0	Consolation

Scores

8:00am CST	UCSB	2–0	Delaware	Field 17
Thu, November 15		Report		Stadium: Mike Rose Soccer Complex; Memphis, Tennessee

1:15pm CST	Delaware	1–0	Virginia Tech	Field 17
Thu, November 15		Report		Stadium: Mike Rose Soccer Complex; Memphis, Tennessee

6:30pm CST	Virginia Tech	0–4	UCSB	Field 17
Thu, November 15		Report		Stadium: Mike Rose Soccer Complex; Memphis, Tennessee

Group E
Pos	Team	Pld	W	D	L	GF	GA	GD	Pts	Qualification
1	Colorado State	2	1	1	0	2	1	+1	4	Advanced to knockout stage
2	Boston College	2	1	1	0	1	0	+1	4	Advanced to knockout stage
3	UC Berkeley	2	0	0	2	1	3	−2	0	Consolation

Scores

9:45am CST	Boston College	1–0	Cal	Field 14
Thu, November 15		Report		Stadium: Mike Rose Soccer Complex; Memphis, Tennessee

3:00pm CST	Cal	1–2	CSU	Field 14
Thu, November 15		Report		Stadium: Mike Rose Soccer Complex; Memphis, Tennessee

8:15pm CST	CSU	0–0	Boston College	Field 14
Thu, November 15		Report		Stadium: Mike Rose Soccer Complex; Memphis, Tennessee

Group F
Pos	Team	Pld	W	D	L	GF	GA	GD	Pts	Qualification
1	Texas	2	2	0	0	10	2	+7 (Note: Actual GD differs because the max GD for any one game is ±5, which came into effect when Texas beat SDSU 7–1)	6	Advanced to knockout stage
2	Michigan State	2	1	0	1	3	3	0	3	Advanced to knockout stage
3	San Diego State	2	0	0	2	1	9	−7	0	Consolation

Scores

9:45am CST	Texas	7–1	SDSU	Field 15
Thu, November 15		Report		Stadium: Mike Rose Soccer Complex; Memphis, Tennessee

3:00pm CST	SDSU	0–2	Michigan State	Field 15
Thu, November 15		Report		Stadium: Mike Rose Soccer Complex; Memphis, Tennessee

8:15pm CST	Michigan State	1–3	Texas	Field 15
Thu, November 15		Report		Stadium: Mike Rose Soccer Complex; Memphis, Tennessee

Group G
Pos	Team	Pld	W	D	L	GF	GA	GD	Pts	Qualification
1	Cal Poly	2	2	0	0	7	0	+7	6	Advanced to knockout stage
2	Georgia	2	1	0	1	1	3	−2	3	Advanced to knockout stage
3	College of New Jersey	2	0	0	2	0	5	−5	0	Consolation

Scores

9:45am CST	Georgia	1–0	TCNJ	Field 16
Thu, November 15		Report		Stadium: Mike Rose Soccer Complex; Memphis, Tennessee

3:00pm CST	TCNJ	0–4	Cal Poly	Field 16
Thu, November 15		Report		Stadium: Mike Rose Soccer Complex; Memphis, Tennessee

8:15pm CST	Cal Poly	3–0	Georgia	Field 16
Thu, November 15		Report		Stadium: Mike Rose Soccer Complex; Memphis, Tennessee

Group H
Pos	Team	Pld	W	D	L	GF	GA	GD	Pts	Qualification
1	Virginia	2	2	0	0	3	1	+2	6	Advanced to knockout stage
2	Pittsburgh	2	0	1	1	2	3	−1	1	Advanced to knockout stage
3	Indiana	2	0	1	1	1	2	−1	1	Consolation

Scores

9:45am CST	Pittsburgh	1–2	Virginia	Field 17
Thu, November 15		Report		Stadium: Mike Rose Soccer Complex; Memphis, Tennessee

3:00pm CST	Virginia	1–0	Indiana	Field 17
Thu, November 15		Report		Stadium: Mike Rose Soccer Complex; Memphis, Tennessee

8:15pm CST	Indiana	1–1	Pittsburgh	Field 17
Thu, November 15		Report		Stadium: Mike Rose Soccer Complex; Memphis, Tennessee

=== Men's open ===
Group A
Pos	Team	Pld	W	D	L	GF	GA	GD	Pts	Qualification
1	Colorado State	3	2	0	1	3	1	+2	6	Advanced to knockout stage
2	UConn	3	1	1	1	6	3	+3	4	
3	Texas Tech	3	1	1	1	3	2	+1	4	
4	Samford	3	1	0	2	1	7	−6	3	

Scores

8:00am CST	Colorado State	0–1	Samford	Field 2
Thu, November 15		Report		Stadium: Mike Rose Soccer Complex; Memphis, Tennessee

8:00am CST	Texas Tech	1–1	UConn	Field 3
Thu, November 15		Report		Stadium: Mike Rose Soccer Complex; Memphis, Tennessee

3:00pm CST	UConn	0–2	Colorado State	Field 2
Thu, November 15		Report		Stadium: Mike Rose Soccer Complex; Memphis, Tennessee

3:00pm CST	Samford	0–2	Texas Tech	Field 3
Thu, November 15		Report		Stadium: Mike Rose Soccer Complex; Memphis, Tennessee

8:00am CST	Colorado State	1–0	Texas Tech	Field 2
Fri, November 17		Report		Stadium: Mike Rose Soccer Complex; Memphis, Tennessee

8:00am CST	UConn	5–0	Samford	Field 3
Fri, November 17		Report		Stadium: Mike Rose Soccer Complex; Memphis, Tennessee

Group B
Pos	Team	Pld	W	D	L	GF	GA	GD	Pts	Qualification
1	JMU	3	2	1	0	4	1	+3	7	Advanced to knockout stage
2	Cincinnati	3	2	1	0	4	1	+3	7	Advanced to knockout stage
3	Colorado “Black”	3	0	1	2	4	6	−2	1	
4	Baylor	3	0	1	2	2	6	−4	1	

Scores

8:00am CST	Baylor	0–2	Cincinnati	Field 4
Thu, November 15		Report		Stadium: Mike Rose Soccer Complex; Memphis, Tennessee

8:00am CST	JMU	2–1	Colorado “Black”	Field 5
Thu, November 15		Report		Stadium: Mike Rose Soccer Complex; Memphis, Tennessee

3:00pm CST	Colorado “Black”	2–2	Baylor	Field 4
Thu, November 15		Report		Stadium: Mike Rose Soccer Complex; Memphis, Tennessee

3:00pm CST	Cincinnati	0–0	JMU	Field 5
Thu, November 15		Report		Stadium: Mike Rose Soccer Complex; Memphis, Tennessee

8:00am CST	Baylor	0–2	JMU	Field 4
Fri, November 17		Report		Stadium: Mike Rose Soccer Complex; Memphis, Tennessee

8:00am CST	Colorado “Black”	1–2	Cincinnati	Field 5
Fri, November 17		Report		Stadium: Mike Rose Soccer Complex; Memphis, Tennessee

3:00pm CST	Cincinnati	PKs; Penalty seeding	JMU	Field 5
Thu, November 15		Report		Stadium: Mike Rose Soccer Complex; Memphis, Tennessee

Group C
Pos	Team	Pld	W	D	L	GF	GA	GD	Pts	Qualification
1	Iowa State	3	3	0	0	8	1	+7	9	Advanced to knockout stage
2	Arkansas	3	1	1	1	5	3	+2	4	
3	Texas “B”	3	1	1	1	3	2	+1	4	
4	Arkansas State	3	0	0	3	1	11	−10	0	

Scores

8:00am CST	Texas “B”	3–0	Arkansas State	Field 6
Thu, November 15		Report		Stadium: Mike Rose Soccer Complex; Memphis, Tennessee

8:00am CST	Iowa State	2–1	Arkansas	Field 8
Thu, November 15		Report		Stadium: Mike Rose Soccer Complex; Memphis, Tennessee

3:00pm CST	Arkansas	0–0	Texas “B”	Field 6
Thu, November 15		Report		Stadium: Mike Rose Soccer Complex; Memphis, Tennessee

3:00pm CST	Arkansas State	0–4	Iowa State	Field 8
Thu, November 15		Report		Stadium: Mike Rose Soccer Complex; Memphis, Tennessee

8:00am CST	Texas “B”	0–2	Iowa State	Field 6
Fri, November 17		Report		Stadium: Mike Rose Soccer Complex; Memphis, Tennessee

8:00am CST	Arkansas	4–1	Arkansas State	Field 8
Fri, November 17		Report		Stadium: Mike Rose Soccer Complex; Memphis, Tennessee

Group D
Pos	Team	Pld	W	D	L	GF	GA	GD	Pts	Qualification
1	Missouri	3	3	0	0	9	2	+7	9	Advanced to knockout stage
2	Sam Houston State	3	2	0	1	7	4	+3	6	Advanced to knockout stage
3	CSU Fullerton	3	0	1	2	3	5	−2	1	
4	Villanova	3	0	1	2	2	10	−8	1	

Scores

9:45am CST	Missouri	2–1	Sam Houston	Field 2
Thu, November 15		Report		Stadium: Mike Rose Soccer Complex; Memphis, Tennessee

9:45am CST	Fullerton	1–1	Villanova	Field 3
Thu, November 15		Report		Stadium: Mike Rose Soccer Complex; Memphis, Tennessee

4:45pm CST	Villanova	0–5	Missouri	Field 2
Thu, November 15		Report		Stadium: Mike Rose Soccer Complex; Memphis, Tennessee

4:45pm CST	Sam Houston	2–1	Fullerton	Field 3
Thu, November 15		Report		Stadium: Mike Rose Soccer Complex; Memphis, Tennessee

10:00am CST	Missouri	2–1	Fullerton	Field 2
Fri, November 17		Report		Stadium: Mike Rose Soccer Complex; Memphis, Tennessee

10:00am CST	Villanova	1–4	Sam Houston	Field 3
Fri, November 17		Report		Stadium: Mike Rose Soccer Complex; Memphis, Tennessee

Group E
Pos	Team	Pld	W	D	L	GF	GA	GD	Pts	Qualification
1	UC Berkeley	3	3	0	0	5	0	+5	9	Advanced to knockout stage
2	Miami (FL)	3	1	1	1	1	2	−1	4	
3	Kansas	3	0	2	1	0	1	−1	2	
4	SUNY Cortland	3	0	1	2	0	3	−3	1	

Scores

9:45am CST	Kansas	0–0	Miami	Field 4
Thu, November 15		Report		Stadium: Mike Rose Soccer Complex; Memphis, Tennessee

9:45am CST	Cal	2–0	SUNY Cortland	Field 5
Thu, November 15		Report		Stadium: Mike Rose Soccer Complex; Memphis, Tennessee

4:45pm CST	SUNY Cortland	0–0	Kansas	Field 4
Thu, November 15		Report		Stadium: Mike Rose Soccer Complex; Memphis, Tennessee

4:45pm CST	Miami	0–2	Cal	Field 5
Thu, November 15		Report		Stadium: Mike Rose Soccer Complex; Memphis, Tennessee

10:00am CST	Kansas	0–1	Cal	Field 4
Fri, November 17		Report		Stadium: Mike Rose Soccer Complex; Memphis, Tennessee

10:00am CST	SUNY Cortland	0–1	Miami	Field 5
Fri, November 17		Report		Stadium: Mike Rose Soccer Complex; Memphis, Tennessee

Group F
Pos	Team	Pld	W	D	L	GF	GA	GD	Pts	Qualification
1	San Diego State	3	2	1	0	8	5	+3	7	Advanced to knockout stage
2	NC State	3	2	0	1	6	5	+1	6	
3	Pennsylvania	3	1	1	1	5	4	+1	4	
4	Houston CC	3	0	0	3	4	9	−5	0	

Scores

9:45am CST	SDSU	3–1	Houston CC	Field 6
Thu, November 15		Report		Stadium: Mike Rose Soccer Complex; Memphis, Tennessee

9:45am CST	Penn	0–1	NC State	Field 8
Thu, November 15		Report		Stadium: Mike Rose Soccer Complex; Memphis, Tennessee

4:45pm CST	NC State	2–3	SDSU	Field 6
Thu, November 15		Report		Stadium: Mike Rose Soccer Complex; Memphis, Tennessee

4:45pm CST	Houston CC	1–3	Penn	Field 8
Thu, November 15		Report		Stadium: Mike Rose Soccer Complex; Memphis, Tennessee

10:00am CST	SDSU	2–2	Penn	Field 6
Fri, November 17		Report		Stadium: Mike Rose Soccer Complex; Memphis, Tennessee

10:00am CST	NC State	3–2	Houston CC	Field 8
Fri, November 17		Report		Stadium: Mike Rose Soccer Complex; Memphis, Tennessee

=== Women's open ===
Group A
Pos	Team	Pld	W	D	L	GF	GA	GD	Pts	Qualification
1	Missouri	3	3	0	0	8	0	+8	9	Advanced to knockout stage
2	Colorado Mines	3	1	1	1	2	4	−2	4	
3	Penn	3	1	0	2	2	3	−1	3	
4	Iowa State	3	0	1	2	0	5	−5	1	

Scores

11:30am CST	Missouri	4–0	Colorado Mines	Field 2
Thu, November 15		Report		Stadium: Mike Rose Soccer Complex; Memphis, Tennessee

11:30am CST	Penn	2–0	Iowa State	Field 3
Thu, November 15		Report		Stadium: Mike Rose Soccer Complex; Memphis, Tennessee

6:30pm CST	Iowa State	0–3	Missouri	Field 2
Thu, November 15		Report		Stadium: Mike Rose Soccer Complex; Memphis, Tennessee

6:30pm CST	Colorado Mines	2–0	Penn	Field 3
Thu, November 15		Report		Stadium: Mike Rose Soccer Complex; Memphis, Tennessee

12:00pm CST	Missouri	1–0	Penn	Field 2
Fri, November 17		Report		Stadium: Mike Rose Soccer Complex; Memphis, Tennessee

12:00pm CST	Iowa State	0–0	Colorado Mines	Field 3
Fri, November 17		Report		Stadium: Mike Rose Soccer Complex; Memphis, Tennessee

Group B
Pos	Team	Pld	W	D	L	GF	GA	GD	Pts	Qualification
1	Miami (FL)	3	2	1	0	5	1	+4	7	Advanced to knockout stage
2	Oregon	3	2	0	1	5	2	+3	6	
3	Villanova	3	1	0	2	2	7	−5	3	
4	Old Dominion	3	0	1	2	1	3	−2	1	

Scores

11:30am CST	Oregon	0–1	Miami	Field 4
Thu, November 15		Report		Stadium: Mike Rose Soccer Complex; Memphis, Tennessee

11:30am CST	Villanova	1–0	ODU	Field 5
Thu, November 15		Report		Stadium: Mike Rose Soccer Complex; Memphis, Tennessee

6:30pm CST	ODU	1–2	Oregon	Field 4
Thu, November 15		Report		Stadium: Mike Rose Soccer Complex; Memphis, Tennessee

6:30pm CST	Miami	4–1	Villanova	Field 5
Thu, November 15		Report		Stadium: Mike Rose Soccer Complex; Memphis, Tennessee

12:00pm CST	Oregon	3–0	Villanova	Field 4
Fri, November 17		Report		Stadium: Mike Rose Soccer Complex; Memphis, Tennessee

12:00pm CST	ODU	0–0	Miami	Field 5
Fri, November 17		Report		Stadium: Mike Rose Soccer Complex; Memphis, Tennessee

Group C
Pos	Team	Pld	W	D	L	GF	GA	GD	Pts	Qualification
1	JMU	3	2	1	0	11	1	+7 (Note: Actual GD differs because the max GD for any one game is ±5, which came into effect when JMU beat UW-Milwaukee 8–0)	7	Advanced to knockout stage
2	Illinois	3	2	1	0	6	1	+5	7	Advanced to knockout stage
3	Salt Lake CC	3	1	0	2	7	5	+2	3	
4	UW-Milwaukee	3	0	0	3	2	19	−14	0	

Scores

11:30am CST	Illinois	5–1	UW-Milwaukee	Field 6
Thu, November 15		Report		Stadium: Mike Rose Soccer Complex; Memphis, Tennessee

11:30am CST	JMU	3–1	SLCC	Field 8
Thu, November 15		Report		Stadium: Mike Rose Soccer Complex; Memphis, Tennessee

6:30pm CST	SLCC	0–1	Illinois	Field 6
Thu, November 15		Report		Stadium: Mike Rose Soccer Complex; Memphis, Tennessee

6:30pm CST	UW-Milwaukee	0–8	JMU	Field 8
Thu, November 15		Report		Stadium: Mike Rose Soccer Complex; Memphis, Tennessee

12:00pm CST	Illinois	0–0	JMU	Field 6
Fri, November 17		Report		Stadium: Mike Rose Soccer Complex; Memphis, Tennessee

12:00pm CST	SLCC	6–1	UW-Milwaukee	Field 8
Fri, November 17		Report		Stadium: Mike Rose Soccer Complex; Memphis, Tennessee

Group D
Pos	Team	Pld	W	D	L	GF	GA	GD	Pts	Qualification
1	Penn State	3	2	1	0	6	1	+5	7	Advanced to knockout stage
2	Colorado “Black”	3	2	0	1	4	2	+2	6	
3	Texas-San Marcos	3	1	1	1	3	2	+1	4	
4	Wash U	3	0	0	3	0	8	−8	0	

Scores

1:15pm CST	Penn State	4–0	Washington U	Field 2
Thu, November 15		Report		Stadium: Mike Rose Soccer Complex; Memphis, Tennessee

1:15pm CST	Texas State	0–2	Colorado “Black”	Field 3
Thu, November 15		Report		Stadium: Mike Rose Soccer Complex; Memphis, Tennessee

8:15pm CST	Colorado “Black”	1–2	Penn State	Field 2
Thu, November 15		Report		Stadium: Mike Rose Soccer Complex; Memphis, Tennessee

8:15pm CST	Washington U	0–3	Texas State	Field 3
Thu, November 15		Report		Stadium: Mike Rose Soccer Complex; Memphis, Tennessee

2:00pm CST	Penn State	0–0	Texas State	Field 2
Fri, November 17		Report		Stadium: Mike Rose Soccer Complex; Memphis, Tennessee

2:00pm CST	Colorado “Black”	1–0	Washington U	Field 3
Fri, November 17		Report		Stadium: Mike Rose Soccer Complex; Memphis, Tennessee

Group E
Pos	Team	Pld	W	D	L	GF	GA	GD	Pts	Qualification
1	Vanderbilt	2	2	0	0	4	1	+3	9	Advanced to knockout stage
2	UCLA	2	1	0	1	7	3	+4	6	Advanced to knockout stage
3	Towson	2	0	0	2	2	6	−4	3	
4	Texas Tech	Could not attend, all other teams given +3 points and +1 GD								

Scores

1:15pm CST	Vanderbilt	1–0	Towson	Field 5
Thu, November 15		Report		Stadium: Mike Rose Soccer Complex; Memphis, Tennessee

8:15pm CST	Towson	1–5	UCLA	Field 4
Thu, November 15		Report		Stadium: Mike Rose Soccer Complex; Memphis, Tennessee

2:00pm CST	UCLA	1–2	Vanderbilt	Field 4
Fri, November 17		Report		Stadium: Mike Rose Soccer Complex; Memphis, Tennessee

Group F
Pos	Team	Pld	W	D	L	GF	GA	GD	Pts	Qualification
1	Arizona	3	2	1	0	7	2	+5	7	Advanced to knockout stage
2	UConn	3	1	2	0	7	2	+5	5	
3	Texas “B”	3	1	1	1	9	3	+3 (Note: Actual GD differs because the max GD for any one game is ±5, which came into effect when Texas "B" beat MTSU 8–0)	4	
4	MTSU	3	0	0	3	1	17	−13	0	

Scores

1:15pm CST	Arizona	2–0	Texas “B”	Field 6
Thu, November 15		Report		Stadium: Mike Rose Soccer Complex; Memphis, Tennessee

1:15pm CST	UConn	5–0	MTSU	Field 8
Thu, November 15		Report		Stadium: Mike Rose Soccer Complex; Memphis, Tennessee

8:15pm CST	MTSU	1–4	Arizona	Field 6
Thu, November 15		Report		Stadium: Mike Rose Soccer Complex; Memphis, Tennessee

8:15pm CST	Texas “B”	1–1	UConn	Field 8
Thu, November 15		Report		Stadium: Mike Rose Soccer Complex; Memphis, Tennessee

2:00pm CST	Arizona	1–1	UConn	Field 6
Fri, November 17		Report		Stadium: Mike Rose Soccer Complex; Memphis, Tennessee

2:00pm CST	MTSU	0–8	Texas “B”	Field 8
Fri, November 17		Report		Stadium: Mike Rose Soccer Complex; Memphis, Tennessee

== Tournament bracket ==
=== Men's championship ===
Sweet 16
Fri • 10:00am • Field 10
Weber State (a.e.t.)	2
USC	1
Fri • 10:00am • Field 11
TCU	0
Texas A&M	2
Fri • 10:00am • Field 12
Cal Poly	2
Colorado Mines	1
Fri • 10:00am • Field 13
Virginia Tech	0
Harvard	1
Fri • 12:00pm • Field 10
Illinois	1
Texas	0
Fri • 12:00pm • Field 11
Michigan State (pen.)	1 (5)
Georgia	1 (4)
Fri • 12:00pm • Field 12
Ohio State	0
Penn State	1
Fri • 12:00pm • Field 13
Colorado	1
Wash U	2

Quarterfinals
Fri • 4:00pm • Field 10
Weber State	2
Texas A&M	0
Fri • 4:00pm • Field 12
Cal Poly	4
Harvard	1
Fri • 6:00pm • Field 10
Illinois	0
Michigan State	1
Fri • 6:00pm • Field 12
Penn State	0
Wash U	1

Semifinals
Sat • 10:00am • Field 10
Weber State (pen.)	0 (4)
Cal Poly	0 (3)
Sat • 10:00am • Field 12
Michigan State	3
Wash U	0

Final
Sat • 5:00pm • Stadium
Weber State	0 (1)
Michigan State (pen.)	0 (4)

==== Men's consolation ====
Quarterfinals
Fri • 4:00pm • Field 2
Grand Valley State	2
Auburn	0
Fri • 4:00pm • Field 4
LSU	0
Minnesota	2
Fri • 6:00pm • Field 2
Arizona	0
Denver	1
Fri • 6:00pm • Field 4
UCLA	0
Florida	3

Semifinals
Sat • 8:00am • Field 14
Grand Valley State	2
Minnesota	1
Sat • 8:00am • Field 16
Denver	1
Florida	3

Final
Sat • 1:00pm • Field 13
Grand Valley State	2
Florida	1

=== Women's championship ===
Sweet 16
Fri • 10:00am • Field 14
Ohio State	1
Delaware	0
Fri • 10:00am • Field 17
Virginia	1
Boston College	0
Fri • 10:00am • Field 16
Cal Poly	1
Michigan State	2
Fri • 10:00am • Field 1
Colorado	2 (4)
Texas A&M	2 (3)
Fri • 12:00pm • Field 14
North Carolina (pen.)	0 (4)
Kansas	0 (2)
Fri • 12:00pm • Field 17
Texas	3
Georgia	0
Fri • 12:00pm • Field 16
Colorado State	0
Pitt	1
Fri • 12:00pm • Field 1
UC-Santa Barbara	1
Baylor	0

Quarterfinals
Fri • 4:00pm • Field 14
Ohio State	0
Virginia	1
Fri • 4:00pm • Field 16
Michigan State	2
Colorado	1
Fri • 6:00pm • Field 14
North Carolina	0
Texas	2
Fri • 6:00pm • Field 16
Pitt	0
UC-Santa Barbara	1

Semifinals
Sat • 10:00am • Field 11
Virginia	0
Michigan State	4
Sat • 10:00am • Field 13
Texas	0 (2)
UC-Santa Barbara (pen.)	0 (4)

Final
Sat • 3:00pm • Stadium
Michigan State (a.e.t.)	2
UC-Santa Barbara	1

==== Women's consolation ====
Quarterfinals
Fri • 4:00pm • Field 3
Cornell	0
UC-Berkeley	2
Fri • 4:00pm • Field 5
San Diego State (pen.)	0 (3)
Michigan	0 (2)
Fri • 6:00pm • Field 3
Miami (OH)	3
College of New Jersey	1
Fri • 6:00pm • Field 5
Indiana	1
Virginia Tech	0

Semifinals
Sat • 8:00am • Field 17
UC-Berkeley	0 (6)
San Diego State	0 (5)
Sat • 8:00am • Field 1
Miami (OH)	1
Indiana	0

Final
Sat • 1:00pm • Field 11
UC-Berkeley	2
Miami (OH)	1

=== Men's open ===
Quarterfinals
Fri • 4:00pm • Field 6
Missouri	0
San Diego State	2
Fri • 4:00pm • Field 8
Iowa State	1 (3)
Cincinnati (pen.)	1 (4)
Fri • 4:00pm • Field 11
JMU (a.e.t.)	1
Colorado State	0
Fri • 4:00pm • Field 13
UC-Berkeley	3
Sam Houston State	0

Semifinals
Sat • 8:00am • Field 10
San Diego State (pen.)	1 (4)
Cincinnati	1 (3)
Sat • 8:00am • Field 12
JMU	1
UC-Berkeley	2

Final
Sat • 1:00pm • Field 12
San Diego State (pen.)	1 (4)
UC-Berkeley	1 (3)

=== Women's open ===
Quarterfinals
Fri • 4:00pm • Field 10
Vanderbilt	1 (2)
Penn State (pen.)	1 (3)
Fri • 4:00pm • Field 11
Missouri	1
Illinois	2
Fri • 4:00pm • Field 12
JMU	2
Miami (FL)	1
Fri • 4:00pm • Field 13
Arizona	1
UCLA	3

Semifinals
Sat • 8:00am • Field 11
Penn State	0
Illinois	1
Sat • 8:00am • Field 13
JMU	1
UCLA	0

Final
Sat • 1:00pm • Field 10
Illinois	0 (1)
JMU (pen.)	0 (3)
