= 1998 NIRSA National Soccer Championship =

- League: NIRSA
- Sport: Soccer
- Site: Georgia Southern; Statesboro, Georgia
- Duration: November 19–21, 1998
- Teams: 16 (men's championship); 16 (women's championship); 16 (men's open); 6 (women's open)

Men's Championship Division
- Score: 4–0
- Champion: BYU (3rd title, 3rd title game)
- Runners-up: Texas Tech (1st title game)
- Season MVP: Brandon LeRoy (BYU)

Women's Championship Division
- Score: 0–0 (a.e.t.) (4–3 p)
- Champion: Colorado (2nd title, 2nd title game)
- Runners-up: Penn State (2nd title game)
- Season MVP: Nicole Skogg (Colorado)

Men's Open Division
- Score: 1–0
- Champion: LSU (1st title, 1st title game)
- Runners-up: Virginia (1st title game)
- Season MVP: Andre Dugas (LSU)

Women's Open Division
- Champion: Colorado State "Green" (1st title, 2nd title game)
- Runners-up: Florida State (1st title game)
- Top seed: Courtney Kramer (Colorado State "Green")

NIRSA national soccer championships seasons
- ← 1997 1999 →

The 1998 NIRSA national soccer championship was the 5th NIRSA National Soccer Championships, the annual national championships for United States-based, collegiate club soccer teams organized by NIRSA. It took place at Georgia Southern University in Statesboro, Georgia from Thursday, November 19 to Saturday, November 21, 1998.

== Overview ==
=== Men's championship ===
In the finals, reigning men's open champions, Texas Tech, would face reigning champions, BYU, who were looking to claim their third straight title. Prior to this, both teams would top their respective groups with Texas Tech defeating Salt Lake CC 1–0 in their opener followed by a 2-2 tie with Georgia and a 6–0 win over Clemson in their finale. Meanwhile, BYU defeated Baylor 3-1 in a rematch of the 1996 finals, 1994 champions Purdue 4-1, and hosts Georgia Southern 5-0.

In the quarterfinals, BYU would defeat 1995 champions, Texas, 3-0 while Texas Tech would defeat Illinois 1-0. In the semifinals, BYU would defeat Salt Lake CC 5–0 in a rematch of last year's quarterfinal matchup that BYU won 2–1 while Texas Tech would defeat hosts Georgia Southern 4-1 to advance to their first finals. In the finals, BYU would dominate with a 4–0 win over Texas Tech, becoming the first team to win three national titles. Freshman, Brandon LeRoy, of BYU would be named the tournament's MVP after scoring five of the team's 23 goals while John Morris of BYU would be named the tournament's best goalkeeper after only conceding twice, with both goals being in the group stage.

=== Women's championship ===
In the finals, reigning runners-up and undefeated Penn State would face 1995 champions, Colorado. Prior to this, in the group stage, Penn State would win their opener against Illinois 3–1 with two goals from Penn State's Kate Stober while Colorado would lose their first match of the season in the opener to Ohio River Soccer Conference semifinalist, Ohio State, 2–1. In their second match, Penn State defeated Texas State 6–0 while Colorado improved from their loss by beating Salisbury State 3-0. In the Group A finale, Penn State would face Virginia Tech with both teams already qualifying for the quarterfinals after Virginia Tech also won their first two matches by at least three goals. However, since Virginia Tech had yet to concede, Penn State would need to win to claim first place due to the goal they conceded to Illinois in their opener; any other result would leave Virginia Tech in first in the group. The game would go on to be deadlocked at 0–0, meaning Virginia Tech would win the group and face Group D runners-up, North Carolina, while Penn State would take second and face reigning champions, Colorado State.

Meanwhile, going into the final games in Group B, Colorado would face Clemson and Ohio State would face Salisbury State with the current standings having Clemson in first with 18 points, Colorado in second with 11 points, and Ohio State in third with 9 points. In the finale, Ohio State would claim all 10 possible points with a 3–0 win over Salisbury State, meaning if Ohio State and/or Colorado wanted to advance to the quarterfinals, Colorado would need to beat Clemson, which they would do with a 3–0 win over Clemson. After this, Colorado would top the group and face Texas A&M, Ohio State would finish second and face JMU, and Clemson would be eliminated being just one point shy of a quarterfinal berth.

In the quarterfinals, Colorado would defeat Texas A&M 3-1 while Penn State would face reigning champions Colorado State in a rematch of last year's finale which Colorado State won 1–0. In the game, Colorado State would open the scoring in the 15th minute and would carry the 1–0 lead into the break. Penn State would equalize in the 60th minute on penalty kick goal from Liz Villamil. The game would remain tied 1–1 after regulation, meaning overtime would be required. A goal at the end of the first period of overtime from Penn State's Ruth Uselton would give them their first lead of the match. Colorado State were unable to score in the five remaining minutes, sending Penn State to their second consecutive final four. In the semifinals, Colorado would defeat North Carolina 1-0 while Penn State would face another undefeated team, JMU, in a rematch of last years semifinal that Penn State won 2–1. In the match, Penn State's Katie Stober would open the scoring with a goal in the 43rd minute via a header following a shot from Ruth Uselton whose shot hit the crossbar. This would prove to be the lone goal of the match, giving JMU their first loss of the season and sending Penn State to their second straight finals. In the finals, the game would remain deadlocked at 0–0 after regulation, meaning extra time would be required, the first time it would be required for a women's championship final. The overtime would also remain scoreless meaning, for the first time in any of the four divisions, penalties would determine a division's champion. Colorado would go on to win the shootout 4–3 and claim their second title. Colorado's Nicole Skogg would be named the tournament MVP.

=== Men's open ===
In the finals, LSU would face off against Virginia in a rematch of their second group stage match. In the group stage, both teams would win their opener with LSU beating Rutgers 3-0 and Virginia beating Grand Valley State 1-0. In their second group stage match, Virginia would score the lone goal of the match against LSU to win 1-0. In the finale, both teams would win with LSU beating Grand Valley State 5-0 and Virginia beating Rutgers 2-0, meaning Virginia would top the group to face group H runners-up, Oregon, in the quarterfinals while LSU would face Group H winners, JMU "Purple".

In the quarterfinals, Virginia would win 2-1 and would face JMU's "Gold" team in the semifinals while LSU would win 4-0 and face Daytona Beach CC. In the semifinals, would once again win 2-1 and LSU would win 3-1 to set up the group stage rematch. In this rematch, LSU would this time be victorious after scoring the lone goal of the match en route to a 1–0 win over Virginia and would claim their first open title. LSU's Andre Dugas would go on to be named the tournament's MVP.

=== Women's open ===
In the finals, Florida State would face off against reigning women's open runners-up, Colorado State "Green", otherwise known as Colorado State's "B" or second team in a rematch of both teams' second game. Prior to this, in the group stage, both teams would win their opener with Florida State beating LSU 3-0 and Colorado State "Green" beating Georgia Tech 2-0. In the second match, both teams would face off and Colorado State "Green" would defeat Florida State in dominate fashion, 5-1. In the finale, Colorado State "Green" would defeat hosts Georgia Southern 9-0 while Florida State would defeat NW Missouri State 3-1. Both teams would end up topping their respective groups, meaning they automatically advanced to the semifinals.

In the semifinals, both teams would secure a 3-0 victory with Florida State defeating Georgia Tech, who defeated hosts Georgia Southern 4-1 in the opening round, while Colorado State "Green" defeated NW Missouri State who defeated LSU in penalties in their opening matchup. In the finals, the game would be deadlocked at 1-1 after regulation and overtime, meaning penalties would be required to determine a winner joining the current year's women's championship division in being the first championship games requiring penalties. Colorado State "Green" would go on to win in penalties and defeat Florida State to claim their first open title. Colorado State "Green's Courtney Kramer would be named the tournament's MVP.

== Format ==
The competition consisted of 54 teams partitioned into 32 men's teams and 22 women's teams. Each of these partitions were further divided into an invite-only championship division and an open division. All divisions except the women's open were divided into four groups of four teams with the women's open division having two groups of three teams each.

All 4 divisions began with a round-robin tournament. All teams except for ones in the women's open division played each of the other teams in their group once with teams in the women's open division playing each team in the other group from theirs once. Following this, the two best teams in each group advanced to a single-elimination, knockout round except in the women's open division where all teams advanced to the knockout round and the winners of each group receiving a bye to the semifinals.

The first metric for determining the best team in each group was points, calculated first by giving a team 6 points for a win, 3 points for a tie, and 0 points for a loss. Then, a team could be awarded an addition point for a shutout and an additional point for every goal scored, up to a max of 3 goals per game. If teams were tied on points, the following criteria were used in order:

1. Winner of head-to-head competition
2. Greatest goal difference
3. Most goals scored
4. Coin toss

The knockout stage was an 8-team tournament for all divisions except the women's open which had a 6-team tournament. Knockout stage games needed to declare a winner, meaning if one was tied at the end of regulation, overtime would begin. Overtime consisted of two complete 5-minute periods. If still tied after overtime, kicks from the mark would determine the winner.

All games consisted of two 40-minute halves with pool play and quarterfinal games were separated by a seven-minute halftime while the halves in the semifinals and finals were separated by a ten minute halftime. If a player received three yellow cards during the course of the tournament they would be suspended the following the game.

== Qualification and selections ==
=== Men's championship ===
Participating teams
Region	Team	Appearance	Last Bid
I	Penn State	2nd	1997
II	Georgia	2nd	1997
II	Florida	1st	Never
II	Georgia Southern	1st	Never
II	Clemson	2nd	1996
III	Purdue	5th	1997
III	Illinois	1st	Never
IV	Texas	5th	1997
IV	Baylor	2nd	1996
IV	Texas Tech	2nd	1994
IV	Texas State	1st	Never
V	Colorado State	2nd	1996
V	Northern Colorado	2nd	1996
VI	Salt Lake CC	4th	1997
VI	BYU	3rd	1997
VI	Utah Valley State	1st	Never

=== Women's championship ===
Participating teams
Region	Team	Appearance	Last Bid
I	Penn State	4th	1997
I	Salisbury State	1st	Never
II	Clemson	3rd	1997
II	JMU	3rd	1997
II	North Carolina	2nd	1997
II	Texas State	1st	Never
II	Virginia Tech	1st	Never
III	Miami (OH)	5th	1997
III	Ohio State	4th	1997
III	Illinois	3rd	1996
IV	Kansas	3rd	1997
IV	Texas	4th	1997
IV	Texas A&M	2nd	1997
V	Colorado	4th	1997
V	Colorado State	2nd	1997
VI	Salt Lake CC	3rd	1997

=== Men's open ===
Region	Num	Team
I	1	Rutgers
II	7	JMU "Purple", JMU "Gold", Miami (FL), Clemson, Daytona Beach CC, Armstrong Atlantic State, Virginia
III	2	Grand Valley State, Toledo
IV	5	LSU, San Antonio CC, Louisiana, Kansas State, Houston
V	0	–
VI	1	Oregon

=== Women's open ===
Region	Num	Team
I	0	-
II	3	Georgia Tech, Florida State, Georgia Southern
III	0	-
IV	2	LSU, NW Missouri State
V	1	Colorado State "Green"
VI	0	-

== Group stage ==
=== Men's championship ===
Group A
Pos	Team	Pld	W	D	L	GF	GA	GD	SO (Note: Shutouts)	GFP (Note: Goals for, points. The points gained by scoring with a max of 3 per game)	Pts	Qualification
1	BYU	3	3	0	0	12	2	+10	1	9	28	Advanced to knockout stage
2	Georgia Southern	3	2	0	1	6	6	0	1	5	18	Advanced to knockout stage
3	Baylor	3	1	0	2	5	6	-1	0	5	11	
4	Purdue	3	0	0	3	2	11	-9	0	2	2	

Scores

10:00am EST	BYU	3–1	Baylor	Field 5
Thu, November 19		Report		Stadium: Georgia Southern University; Statesboro, Georgia

10:00am EST	Georgia Southern	4–0	Purdue	Field 6
Thu, November 19		Report		Stadium: Georgia Southern University; Statesboro, Georgia

4:00pm EST	Purdue	1–4	BYU	Field 5
Thu, November 19		Report		Stadium: Georgia Southern University; Statesboro, Georgia

4:00pm EST	Baylor	1–2	Georgia Southern	Field 6
Thu, November 19		Report		Stadium: Georgia Southern University; Statesboro, Georgia

10:00am EST	BYU	5–0	Georgia Southern	Field 5
Fri, November 20		Report		Stadium: Georgia Southern University; Statesboro, Georgia

10:00am EST	Purdue	1–3	Baylor	Field 6
Fri, November 20		Report		Stadium: Georgia Southern University; Statesboro, Georgia

Group B
Pos	Team	Pld	W	D	L	GF	GA	GD	SO	GFP	Pts	Qualification
1	Colorado State	3	2	0	1	6	4	+2	1	5	18	Advanced to knockout stage
2	Illinois	3	2	0	1	6	5	+1	0	6	18	Advanced to knockout stage
3	Penn State	3	1	1	1	4	4	0	1	4	14	
4	Texas State	3	0	1	2	5	8	-3	0	5	8	

Scores

10:00am EST	Colorado State	4–2	Texas State	Field 7
Thu, November 19		Report		Stadium: Georgia Southern University; Statesboro, Georgia

10:00am EST	Penn State	1–3	Illinois	Field 8
Thu, November 19		Report		Stadium: Georgia Southern University; Statesboro, Georgia

4:00pm EST	Illinois	0–2	Colorado State	Field 7
Thu, November 19		Report		Stadium: Georgia Southern University; Statesboro, Georgia

4:00pm EST	Texas State	1–1	Penn State	Field 8
Thu, November 19		Report		Stadium: Georgia Southern University; Statesboro, Georgia

10:00am EST	Colorado State	0–2	Penn State	Field 7
Fri, November 20		Report		Stadium: Georgia Southern University; Statesboro, Georgia

10:00am EST	Illinois	3–2	Texas State	Field 8
Fri, November 20		Report		Stadium: Georgia Southern University; Statesboro, Georgia

Group C
Pos	Team	Pld	W	D	L	GF	GA	GD	SO	GFP	Pts	Qualification
1	Texas Tech	3	2	1	0	9	2	+7	2	6	23	Advanced to knockout stage
2	Salt Lake CC	3	1	1	1	5	4	+1	0	5	14	Advanced to knockout stage
3	Georgia	3	0	2	1	6	7	-1	0	6	12	
4	Clemson	3	1	0	2	4	11	-7	0	4	10	

Scores

12:00pm EST	Salt Lake CC	0–1	Texas Tech	Field 5
Thu, November 19		Report		Stadium: Georgia Southern University; Statesboro, Georgia

12:00pm EST	Georgia	2–3	Clemson	Field 6
Thu, November 19		Report		Stadium: Georgia Southern University; Statesboro, Georgia

6:00pm EST	Clemson	1–3	Salt Lake CC	Field 5
Thu, November 19		Report		Stadium: Georgia Southern University; Statesboro, Georgia

6:00pm EST	Texas Tech	2–2	Georgia	Field 6
Thu, November 19		Report		Stadium: Georgia Southern University; Statesboro, Georgia

12:00pm EST	Salt Lake CC	2–2	Georgia	Field 5
Fri, November 20		Report		Stadium: Georgia Southern University; Statesboro, Georgia

12:00pm EST	Clemson	0–6	Texas Tech	Field 6
Fri, November 20		Report		Stadium: Georgia Southern University; Statesboro, Georgia

Group D
Pos	Team	Pld	W	D	L	GF	GA	GD	SO	GFP	Pts	Qualification
1	Texas	3	2	1	0	6	1	+5	2	4	21	Advanced to knockout stage
2	Utah Valley State	3	1	2	0	6	4	+2	1	5	18	Advanced to knockout stage
3	Florida	3	0	2	1	4	5	−1	0	4	10	
4	Northern Colorado	3	0	1	2	5	11	-6	0	5	8	

Scores

12:00pm EST	Florida	2–2	Northern Colorado	Field 7
Thu, November 19		Report		Stadium: Georgia Southern University; Statesboro, Georgia

12:00pm EST	Texas	0–0	Utah Valley State	Field 8
Thu, November 19		Report		Stadium: Georgia Southern University; Statesboro, Georgia

6:00pm EST	Utah Valley State	2–2	Florida	Field 7
Thu, November 19		Report		Stadium: Georgia Southern University; Statesboro, Georgia

6:00pm EST	Northern Colorado	1–5	Texas	Field 8
Thu, November 19		Report		Stadium: Georgia Southern University; Statesboro, Georgia

12:00pm EST	Florida	0–1	Texas	Field 7
Fri, November 20		Report		Stadium: Georgia Southern University; Statesboro, Georgia

12:00pm EST	Utah Valley State	4–2	Northern Colorado	Field 8
Fri, November 20		Report		Stadium: Georgia Southern University; Statesboro, Georgia

=== Women's championship ===
Group A
Pos	Team	Pld	W	D	L	GF	GA	GD	SO	GFP	Pts	Qualification
1	Virginia Tech	3	2	1	0	6	0	+6	3	6	24	Advanced to knockout stage
2	Penn State	3	2	1	0	9	1	+8	2	6	23	Advanced to knockout stage
3	Illinois	3	1	0	2	4	6	-2	1	4	11	
4	Texas State	3	0	0	3	0	12	-12	0	0	0	

Scores

8:00am EST	Penn State	3–1	Illinois	Field 9
Thu, November 19	Kate Stober 27'; Kate Stober 34'; Liz Villamil 43'	Report	30'	Stadium: Georgia Southern University; Statesboro, Georgia

8:00am EST	Virginia Tech	3–0	Texas State	Field 10
Thu, November 19		Report		Stadium: Georgia Southern University; Statesboro, Georgia

2:00pm EST	Texas State	0–6	Penn State	Field 9
Thu, November 19		Report	Kathy Uram; Ruth Uselton x2; Christa Rimonneau; Steph DeCecco; Anna Falkenstern	Stadium: Georgia Southern University; Statesboro, Georgia

2:00pm EST	Illinois	0–3	Virginia Tech	Field 10
Thu, November 19		Report		Stadium: Georgia Southern University; Statesboro, Georgia

10:00am EST	Penn State	0–0	Virginia Tech	Field 1
Fri, November 20		Report		Stadium: Georgia Southern University; Statesboro, Georgia

10:00am EST	Texas State	0–3	Illinois	Field 2
Fri, November 20		Report		Stadium: Georgia Southern University; Statesboro, Georgia

Group B
Pos	Team	Pld	W	D	L	GF	GA	GD	SO	GFP	Pts	Qualification
1	Colorado	3	2	0	1	8	2	+6	2	7	21	Advanced to knockout stage
2	Ohio State	3	2	0	1	6	3	+3	1	6	19	Advanced to knockout stage
3	Clemson	3	2	0	1	6	5	+1	1	5	18	
4	Salisbury State	3	0	0	3	0	10	−10	0	0	0	

Scores

12:00pm EST	Colorado	1–2	Ohio State	Field 1
Thu, November 19	Ryan Zwelling	Report	Colleen McPherson; 65' Laurie Barton	Stadium: Georgia Southern University; Statesboro, Georgia

12:00pm EST	Clemson	4–0	Salisbury State	Field 2
Thu, November 19		Report		Stadium: Georgia Southern University; Statesboro, Georgia

6:00pm EST	Salisbury State	0–3	Colorado	Field 1
Thu, November 19		Report		Stadium: Georgia Southern University; Statesboro, Georgia

6:00pm EST	Ohio State	1–2	Clemson	Field 2
Thu, November 19	Jenny Dues	Report	43'	Stadium: Georgia Southern University; Statesboro, Georgia

10:00am EST	Colorado	4–0	Clemson	Field 3
Fri, November 20		Report		Stadium: Georgia Southern University; Statesboro, Georgia

10:00am EST	Salisbury State	0–3	Ohio State	Field 4
Fri, November 20		Report	30' Steph Yoder; Beth Clark; Steph Yoder	Stadium: Georgia Southern University; Statesboro, Georgia

Group C
Pos	Team	Pld	W	D	L	GF	GA	GD	SO	GFP	Pts	Qualification
1	JMU	3	3	0	0	9	0	+9	3	8	29	Advanced to knockout stage
2	Texas A&M	3	2	0	1	6	5	+1	1	5	18	Advanced to knockout stage
3	Salt Lake CC	3	1	0	2	5	4	+1	1	4	11	
4	Kansas	3	0	0	3	0	11	−11	0	0	0	

Scores

10:00am EST	Salt Lake CC	4–0	Kansas	Field 9
Thu, November 19		Report		Stadium: Georgia Southern University; Statesboro, Georgia

10:00am EST	JMU	4–0	Texas A&M	Field 10
Thu, November 19		Report		Stadium: Georgia Southern University; Statesboro, Georgia

4:00pm EST	Texas A&M	2–1	Salt Lake CC	Field 9
Thu, November 19		Report		Stadium: Georgia Southern University; Statesboro, Georgia

4:00pm EST	Kansas	0–3	JMU	Field 10
Thu, November 19		Report		Stadium: Georgia Southern University; Statesboro, Georgia

12:00pm EST	Salt Lake CC	0–2	JMU	Field 1
Fri, November 20		Report		Stadium: Georgia Southern University; Statesboro, Georgia

12:00pm EST	Texas A&M	4–0	Kansas	Field 2
Fri, November 20		Report		Stadium: Georgia Southern University; Statesboro, Georgia

Group D
Pos	Team	Pld	W	D	L	GF	GA	GD	SO	GFP	Pts	Qualification
1	Colorado State	3	2	1	0	7	2	+5	1	7	23	Advanced to knockout stage
2	North Carolina	3	1	1	1	4	4	0	1	4	14	Advanced to knockout stage
3	Texas	3	1	0	2	2	6	-4	1	2	9	
4	Miami (OH)	3	0	2	1	1	2	-1	1	1	8	

Scores

10:00am EST	Texas	1–3	North Carolina	Field 3
Thu, November 19		Report		Stadium: Georgia Southern University; Statesboro, Georgia

10:00am EST	Colorado State	1–1	Miami (OH)	Field 4
Thu, November 19		Report		Stadium: Georgia Southern University; Statesboro, Georgia

4:00pm EST	Miami (OH)	0–1	Texas	Field 3
Thu, November 19		Report		Stadium: Georgia Southern University; Statesboro, Georgia

4:00pm EST	North Carolina	1–3	Colorado State	Field 4
Thu, November 19		Report		Stadium: Georgia Southern University; Statesboro, Georgia

12:00pm EST	Texas	0–3	Colorado State	Field 3
Fri, November 20		Report		Stadium: Georgia Southern University; Statesboro, Georgia

12:00pm EST	Miami (OH)	0–0	North Carolina	Field 4
Fri, November 20		Report		Stadium: Georgia Southern University; Statesboro, Georgia

=== Men's open ===
Group E
Pos	Team	Pld	W	D	L	GF	GA	GD	SO	GFP	Pts	Qualification
1	Virginia	3	3	0	0	4	0	+4	3	4	25	Advanced to knockout stage
2	LSU	3	2	0	1	8	1	+7	2	6	20	Advanced to knockout stage
3	Grand Valley State	3	1	0	2	4	6	-2	1	3	10	
4	Rutgers	3	0	0	3	0	9	-9	0	0	0	

Scores

8:00am EST	LSU	3–0	Rutgers	Field 1
Thu, November 19		Report		Stadium: Georgia Southern University; Statesboro, Georgia

8:00am EST	Grand Valley State	0–1	Virginia	Field 2
Thu, November 19		Report		Stadium: Georgia Southern University; Statesboro, Georgia

2:00pm EST	Virginia	1–0	LSU	Field 1
Thu, November 19		Report		Stadium: Georgia Southern University; Statesboro, Georgia

2:00pm EST	Rutgers	0–4	Grand Valley State	Field 2
Thu, November 19		Report		Stadium: Georgia Southern University; Statesboro, Georgia

8:00am EST	LSU	5–0	Grand Valley State	Field 1
Fri, November 20		Report		Stadium: Georgia Southern University; Statesboro, Georgia

8:00am EST	Virginia	2–0	Rutgers	Field 2
Fri, November 20		Report		Stadium: Georgia Southern University; Statesboro, Georgia

Group F
Pos	Team	Pld	W	D	L	GF	GA	GD	SO	GFP	Pts	Qualification
1	JMU "Gold"	3	2	0	1	8	3	+5	1	6	19	Advanced to knockout stage
2	Toledo	3	2	0	1	6	5	+1	2	4	18	Advanced to knockout stage
3	San Antonio CC	3	1	1	1	4	4	0	0	4	13	
4	Miami (FL)	3	0	1	2	3	9	-6	0	3	6	

Scores

8:00am EST	JMU "Gold"	2–1	Miami (FL)	Field 3
Thu, November 19		Report		Stadium: Georgia Southern University; Statesboro, Georgia

8:00am EST	Toledo	1–0	San Antonio CC	Field 4
Thu, November 19		Report		Stadium: Georgia Southern University; Statesboro, Georgia

2:00pm EST	San Antonio CC	2–1	JMU "Gold"	Field 3
Thu, November 19		Report		Stadium: Georgia Southern University; Statesboro, Georgia

2:00pm EST	Miami (FL)	0–5	Toledo	Field 4
Thu, November 19		Report		Stadium: Georgia Southern University; Statesboro, Georgia

8:00am EST	JMU "Gold"	5–0	Toledo	Field 3
Fri, November 20		Report		Stadium: Georgia Southern University; Statesboro, Georgia

8:00am EST	Miami (FL)	2–2	San Antonio CC	Field 4
Fri, November 20		Report		Stadium: Georgia Southern University; Statesboro, Georgia

Group G
Pos	Team	Pld	W	D	L	GF	GA	GD	SO	GFP	Pts	Qualification
1	Daytona Beach CC	3	3	0	0	8	4	+4	1	7	26	Advanced to knockout stage
2	Louisiana	3	2	0	1	9	4	+5	0	6	18	Advanced to knockout stage
3	Virginia Tech	3	1	0	2	4	6	-2	1	4	11	
4	Kansas State	3	0	0	3	4	11	-7	0	4	4	

Scores

10:00am EST	Virginia Tech	2–0	Kansas State	Field 5
Thu, November 19		Report		Stadium: Georgia Southern University; Statesboro, Georgia

10:00am EST	Louisiana	0–2	Daytona Beach CC	Field 6
Thu, November 19		Report		Stadium: Georgia Southern University; Statesboro, Georgia

4:00pm EST	Daytona Beach CC	2–1	Virginia Tech	Field 5
Thu, November 19		Report		Stadium: Georgia Southern University; Statesboro, Georgia

4:00pm EST	Kansas State	1–5	Louisiana	Field 6
Thu, November 19		Report		Stadium: Georgia Southern University; Statesboro, Georgia

8:00am EST	Virginia Tech	1–4	Louisiana	Field 5
Fri, November 20		Report		Stadium: Georgia Southern University; Statesboro, Georgia

8:00am EST	Daytona Beach CC	4–3	Kansas State	Field 6
Fri, November 20		Report		Stadium: Georgia Southern University; Statesboro, Georgia

Group H
Pos	Team	Pld	W	D	L	GF	GA	GD	SO	GFP	Pts	Qualification
1	JMU "Purple"	3	3	0	0	18	3	+15	1	9	28	Advanced to knockout stage
2	Oregon	3	1	1	1	9	3	+6	2	5	16	Advanced to knockout stage
3	Houston	3	1	1	1	19	4	+15	1	4	14	
4	Armstrong Atlantic State	3	0	0	3	1	37	-36	0	1	1	

Scores

12:00pm EST	JMU "Purple"	12–0	Armstrong State	Field 3
Thu, November 19		Report		Stadium: Georgia Southern University; Statesboro, Georgia

12:00pm EST	Oregon	0–0	Houston	Field 4
Thu, November 19		Report		Stadium: Georgia Southern University; Statesboro, Georgia

6:00pm EST	Houston	1–3	JMU "Purple"	Field 3
Thu, November 19		Report		Stadium: Georgia Southern University; Statesboro, Georgia

6:00pm EST	Armstrong State	0–7	Oregon	Field 4
Thu, November 19		Report		Stadium: Georgia Southern University; Statesboro, Georgia

8:00am EST	JMU "Purple"	3–2	Oregon	Field 7
Fri, November 20		Report		Stadium: Georgia Southern University; Statesboro, Georgia

8:00am EST	Houston	18–1	Armstrong State	Field 8
Fri, November 20		Report		Stadium: Georgia Southern University; Statesboro, Georgia

=== Women's open ===
Group E
Pos	Team	Pld	W	D	L	GF	GA	GD	SO	GFP	Pts	Qualification
1	Florida State	3	2	0	1	7	6	+1	1	7	20	Advanced to semifinals
2	Georgia Tech	3	0	1	2	1	4	-3	0	1	4	Advanced to first round
3	Georgia Southern	3	0	0	3	0	17	-17	0	0	0	Advanced to first round
Group F
Pos	Team	Pld	W	D	L	GF	GA	GD	SO	GFP	Pts	Qualification
1	Colorado State "Green"	3	3	0	0	16	1	+15	2	8	28	Advanced to semifinals
2	LSU	3	2	0	1	6	3	+3	2	4	18	Advanced to first round
3	NW Missouri State	3	1	1	1	5	4	+1	1	5	15	Advanced to first round

Scores

8:00am EST	Florida State	3–0	LSU	Field 5
Thu, November 19		Report		Stadium: Georgia Southern University; Statesboro, Georgia

8:00am EST	Georgia Tech	0–2	Colorado State "Green"	Field 6
Thu, November 19		Report		Stadium: Georgia Southern University; Statesboro, Georgia

8:00am EST	Georgia Southern	0–3	NW Missouri State	Field 7
Thu, November 19		Report		Stadium: Georgia Southern University; Statesboro, Georgia

2:00pm EST	Florida State	1–5	Colorado State "Green"	Field 5
Thu, November 19		Report		Stadium: Georgia Southern University; Statesboro, Georgia

2:00pm EST	Georgia Tech	1–1	NW Missouri State	Field 6
Thu, November 19		Report		Stadium: Georgia Southern University; Statesboro, Georgia

2:00pm EST	Georgia Southern	0–5	LSU	Field 7
Thu, November 19		Report		Stadium: Georgia Southern University; Statesboro, Georgia

8:00am EST	NW Missouri State	1–3	Florida State	Field 9
Fri, November 20		Report		Stadium: Georgia Southern University; Statesboro, Georgia

8:00am EST	LSU	1–0	Georgia Tech	Field 10
Fri, November 20		Report		Stadium: Georgia Southern University; Statesboro, Georgia

10:00am EST	Colorado State "Green"	9–0	Georgia Southern	Field 9
Fri, November 20		Report		Stadium: Georgia Southern University; Statesboro, Georgia

== Tournament bracket ==
=== Men's championship ===
Quarterfinals
Fri • 4:00pm • Field 5
BYU	3
Utah Valley State	0
Fri • 4:00pm • Field 6
Salt Lake CC (pen.)	2 (4)
Colorado State	2 (3)
Fri • 6:00pm • Field 5
Texas Tech	1
Illinois	0
Fri • 6:00pm • Field 6
Texas	0
Georgia Southern (pen.)	1

Semifinals
Sat • 10:00am • Field 3
BYU	5
Salt Lake CC	0
Sat • 10:00am • Field 4
Texas Tech	4
Georgia Southern	1

Final
Sat • 5:00pm • Field 8
BYU	4
Texas Tech	0

=== Women's championship ===
Quarterfinals
Fri • 4:00pm • Field 1
Virginia Tech	0
North Carolina	3
Fri • 4:00pm • Field 2
Texas A&M	1
Colorado	3
Fri • 6:00pm • Field 1
JMU	4
Ohio State	0
Fri • 6:00pm • Field 2
Colorado State	0
Penn State (a.e.t.)	1

Semifinals
Sat • 10:00am • Field 5
North Carolina	0
Colorado	1
Sat • 10:00am • Field 6
JMU	0
Penn State	1

Final
Sat • 3:00pm • Field 7
Colorado (pen.)	1
Penn State	0

=== Men's open ===
Quarterfinals
Fri • 4:00pm • Field 3
Virginia	2
Oregon	1
Fri • 4:00pm • Field 4
Southwestern Louisiana	0
JMU "Gold"	1
Fri • 4:00pm • Field 7
Daytona Beach CC	2
Toledo	1
Fri • 4:00pm • Field 8
JMU "Purple"	0
LSU	4

Semifinals
Sat • 8:00am • Field 3
Virginia	2
JMU "Gold"	1
Sat • 8:00am • Field 4
Daytona Beach CC	1
LSU	3

Final
Sat • 1:00pm • Field 1
Virginia	0
LSU	1

=== Women's open ===
First round
Sat • 8:00am • Field 1
2F	LSU	1
3F	NW Missouri State (pen.)	2
Sat • 8:00am • Field 2
2E	Georgia Tech	4
3E	Georgia Southern	1

Semifinals
Sat • 1:00pm • Field 6
1F	Colorado State "Green"	3
3F	NW Missouri State	0
1E	Florida State	3
2E	Georgia Tech	0

Final
1F	Colorado State "Green" (pen.)	2
1E	Florida State	1

== All-tournament teams ==
Key
MVP
Best goalkeeper

=== Men's championship ===
Position	Name	Team
Forward	Brandon LeRoy	BYU
GK	John Morris	BYU
Defender	Abe Millett	BYU
Forward	Collin Morgan	Utah Valley State
Midfielder	Michael Dawdy	Texas Tech
Defender	Kevin Kennedy	Georgia Southern
Defender	Nate Morris	BYU
Midfielder	Tom Morse	Salt Lake CC
Defender	Chance Abbott	Texas Tech
Midfielder	Chris Sklar	Georgia Southern
Defender	Jeff Dupre	Texas Tech
Forward	Dave Huber	Salt Lake CC
Sportsmanship Award
Salt Lake CC

=== Women's championship ===
Position	Name	Team
Midfielder	Nicole Skogg	Colorado
GK	Sarah Lucey	Colorado
Midfielder	Tinsley Jones	JMU
Defender	Paige Loustalot	Texas A&M
Defender	Georganne Hutchison	Colorado
Forward	Sheryl Freedman	North Carolina
Defender	Karen Lupis	Penn State
Midfielder	Lynne Fogarty	North Carolina
Defender	Lisa Erbacher	Ohio State
Midfielder	Liz Villamil	Penn State
Defender	Varna Swartz	JMU
Forward	Kate Stober	Penn State

=== Men's open ===
Position	Name	Team
Defender	Andre Dugas	LSU
GK	Christian LaFreniere	JMU "Gold"
Defender	Jeff LeBlanc	LSU
Defender	Brad Nitschke	Toledo
Forward	Clifton Philip	Daytona Beach CC
Defender	Chris Potter	Virginia
Defender	Dave Checchio	Virginia
Forward	Chris Wardlaw	Virginia
Forward	Chad Wright	Oregon
Midfielder	Tamer Moumen	JMU
Midfielder	Chris Griffin	LSU
Midfielder	Jeff Carrier	Louisiana

=== Women's open ===
Position	Name	Team
Midfielder	Courtney Kramer	Colorado State "Green"
GK	Jennifer Waite	Georgia Tech
Defender	Jenica Tapocik	Florida State
Defender	Lauren Jardell	LSU
Midfielder	Melissa Cole	Northwest Missouri State
Defender	Shannon Forbes	Colorado State "Green"
Defender	Lisa Imburgia	Florida State
Forward	Mary Stalvey	Georgia Southern
Defender	Elizabeth Coon	Georgia Tech
Forward	Adrienne Winghart	Colorado State "Green"
Forward	Kathrine Bishop	Colorado State "Green"
Forward	Kelly Poole	Florida State
Sportsmanship Award
Florida State
