= Mike Rose Soccer Complex =

Sport complex in Memphis, Tennessee

Mike Rose Soccer Stadium
- Interactive map of Mike Rose Soccer Stadium
- Former names: Mike Rose Soccer Complex
- Location: Memphis, Tennessee
- Coordinates: 35.024479°N 89.763036°W
- Owner: Shelby County
- Operator: OS Memphis
- Capacity: 2,500
- Surface: Grass

Construction
- Opened: 1998 (Complex); 2001(Stadium)
- Cost: $4 million
- Architect: ETI Corporation

Tenant
- Memphis Tigers men's & women's soccer (NCAA D-I) (2001–2018)

The Mike Rose Soccer Complex is a complex of 16 soccer fields and one 2,500-capacity stadium located in Memphis, Tennessee.

The complex and stadium were completed in 2001 at a cost of around $4 million. The complex is home to many clubs in the Memphis area as well as several regional tournaments. The largest cross country race at night known as the Memphis Twilight Invitational is held here as well.

It served as the home of the Memphis Tigers men's and women's soccer from 2001 to 2018. They then moved to the on-campus soccer & track stadium in 2019.

In 2019, the complex hosted two U.S. Open Cup games against Hartford Athletic and Orlando City SC on May 29th and June 12th, respectively. The Orlando City game was sold out with a total of 3,088 spectators.

In 2025, the stadium was announced to be the new home of Memphis FC, a team competing in USL League Two.
