= 2007 NIRSA National Soccer Championship =

- League: NIRSA
- Sport: Soccer
- Site: University of West Florida; Pensacola, FL
- Duration: November 15–17, 2007
- Teams: 24 (Men's championship); 19 (Women's open); 16 (Women's championship and Men's open)
- Results: Official Results

Men's Championship Division
- Score: 0–0 (a.e.t.); 4–1 (pen.)
- Champion: UC-Santa Barbara (1st title, 1st title game)
- Runners-up: Texas Tech (4th title game)
- Season MVP: Joe Ferreira (UC-Santa Barbara)

Women's Championship Division
- Score: 1–1 (a.e.t.); 4–1 (pen.)
- Champion: UC-Santa Barbara (2nd title, 3rd title game)
- Runners-up: San Diego State (2nd title game)
- Season MVP: Allie Browne (UC-Santa Barbara)

Men's Open Division
- Score: 1–1 (a.e.t.); 4–2 (pen.)
- Champion: Missouri (1st title, 1st title game)
- Runners-up: Kansas (2nd title game)
- Season MVP: Ross Pfeifer (Missouri)

Women's Open Division
- Score: 3–1
- Champion: Villanova (1st title, 1st title game)
- Runners-up: UC-Berkeley (1st title game)
- Top seed: Christina Sangiacoma (Villanova)

NIRSA national soccer championships seasons
- ← 2006 2008 →

The 2007 NIRSA national soccer championship was the 14th NIRSA National Soccer Championships, the annual national championships for United States-based, collegiate club soccer teams organized by NIRSA. It took place at the University of West Florida in Pensacola, Florida from Thursday, November 15 to Saturday, November 17, 2007. This tournament was the first where both the men's and women's championship division winners represented the same school.

== Overview ==
=== Men's championship ===
In the finals, three-time runners-up, Texas Tech, were looking to claim their first national title against finals debutants UC-Santa Barbara in a rematch from the Group C finale. Coming into the finals, both teams would defeat Augustana 3–0 in the group stage, ensuring that, regardless of the score from their matchup, they'd both advance with the winner placing first in the group. Texas Tech would win the matchup 2–1 meaning they would face Group B runners-up Minnesota in the round of 16 while UC-Santa Barbara would face Group B winners, Vanderbilt.

In the round of 16, Texas Tech would win their matchup 2–1 against Minnesota, then would beat Arizona 4–0 in the quarterfinals, and finally would beat reigning champions and region III champions, Michigan, 2–1 to advance to their fourth finals. Meanwhile, UC-Santa Barbara would beat 2005 runners-up and region II tournament champion, Vanderbilt, 1–0 in the round of 16, then beat 2002 champions Weber State 1–0 in the quarterfinals, and finally would beat reigning runners-up, Illinois, 5–3 in penalties in the semifinals after a 0–0 game in regulation and overtime.

In the finals, UC-Santa Barbara would receive a red card at the start of the second half but the game would remain 0–0 after overtime and extra time, meaning penalty kicks would decide the men's championship for the first time. UC-Santa Barbara would kick first and both teams would score in the first round of kicks. In rounds 2 and 3, UC-Santa Barbara would score while Texas Tech would not, meaning when UC-Santa Barbara scored in the fourth round they'd secure the 2007 men's championship title. This would be UC-Santa Barbara's first men's championship title and the first time both the men's and women's championship title winners represented the same school. UC-Santa Barbara's Joe Ferreira would be named tournament MVP.

=== Women's championship ===
In the finals, reigning champion, San Diego State, would face 2004 co-champion UC-Santa Barbara. Coming into the finals, San Diego State would win all three group stage matches without conceding a goal while UC-Santa Barbara would lose its group stage opener to Michigan State and end up second in the group behind them.

In the knockout round, San Diego State would defeat region II champion Virginia Tech 2–1 in the quarterfinals then would defeat Michigan State 2–0 in the semifinals. Meanwhile, UC-Santa Barbara would defeat four-time champion Michigan 3–1 in the quarterfinals then after a 0–0 draw following regulation and overtime, they'd defeat 2001 champion Penn State 4–1 in penalty kicks in the semifinals. In the finals, eventual MVP Allie Browne of UC-Santa Barbara would open the scoring in the first minute but Cassidy Runyon of San Diego State would even the score at 1–1 off of a free-kick in the 23rd minute. The score would remain tied at 1–1 after regulation and overtime, meaning penalties would determine the champion. UC-Santa Barbara would kick first, and after both teams scored in the first round, eventual tournament outstanding goalkeeper Emily Ottinia of UC-Santa Barbara would save San Diego State's kicks in the second and third rounds while UC-Santa Barbara would score in both rounds. In the fourth round, UC-Santa Barbara would score their fourth straight penalty and win 4–1. This would be UC-Santa Barbara's second title and first outright due to the title in 2004 being shared.

=== Men's open ===
In the finals, reigning runners-up, Kansas would face finals debutants Missouri. Coming into the finals, Kansas would win all three group stage games while Missouri would tie their group stage finale 1–1 to JMU but would win the group with 7 points. In the quarterfinals, Kansas would face Florida and Missouri would face Oregon with both teams winning 2–1. In the semifinals, Kansas would defeat JMU 2–0 while Missouri would require penalties after the game finished 1–1 which they'd win 4–1. In the finals, the game would be tied 1–1 after regulation meaning overtime would be required for the first time in the men's open division finals. The score would remain the same meaning penalties would determine the men's open champion. Missouri would go on to win 4–2, claiming their 1st men's open title. Missouri's Ross Pfeifer would be named division MVP.

=== Women's open ===
In the finals, Villanova would face UC-Berkeley in what would be the first finals appearance for both teams. Coming into the finals, both teams would win all three group stage games. UC-Berkeley would beat Alabama in the quarterfinals and Arizona in the semifinals, both by a score of 3–0. Meanwhile, Villanova would beat Texas State 1–0 in the quarter finals then beat Virginia 2–0 in the semifinals. In the finals, Villanova would win 3–1 and claim their first women's open title. Villanova's Christina Sangiacomo would be named divisional MVP. This was the only division finals to not require penalties.

== Format ==
The competition consisted of 75 teams: 40 championship teams and 35 open teams. The divisions were further divided into a men's and women's division: 24 men's and 16 women's teams in the championship division and 19 women's and 16 men's teams in the open division. The divisions were then further divided into groups: eight groups of three teams in the men's championship, four teams of four teams in the women's championship and men's open divisions, and five groups of four teams each with one group only having three teams in the women's open division. All four divisions engaged in a round-robin tournament that determined teams able to advance to a knockout stage. Each team played every other team in their group once in pool play which consisted of two 40-minute halves separated by a seven-minute halftime. Pool play utilized the three points for a win system and after pool play, the two highest ranked teams from each group in all but the women's open division advanced to their respective knockout stage, with the third placed team in the men's championship advancing to a consolation bracket while the third and fourth placed teams in the women's championship and men's open divisions being eliminated. In the women's open division, each pool winner automatically advanced in addition to three additional wild-card teams. Positions 1 and 8 were given to first place teams in groups that didn't have a wild-card team in order of tie-breaking procedures, positions 2, 6, and 7 were given to wild-card teams in order of tie-breaking procedures, and positions 5, 3, and 4 were given to the pool winners from the pools of the 2, 6, and 7 positioned wild-card teams, respectively.

Tie-breaking criteria for group play
The ranking of teams in each group was based on the following criteria in order:
1. Highest number of points
2. Winner of head-to-head competition
3. Greatest goal difference
  - Maximum ± 5 goal difference per match
4. Most goals scored
5. Most shutouts

In a tie breaking scenario involving more than 2 teams, the tiebreaker procedure would begin. If one team is identified as different and both remaining teams are still tied, the tie breaker procedure is restarted.

If a tie still remained after the first 5 criteria, the following was used to break a tie:

1. NCAA kicks from the mark
  - If there was a three-way tie, a coin-flip would be conducted. The two teams that chose the same outcome would compete in kicks from the mark between each other. The winner would compete with the last remaining team in kicks from the mark
  - If there's a four-way tie, a drawing of lots would be conducted (only could occur in open division)

Knockout stage games also consisted of two 40-minute halves. The round of 16 and quarterfinals were separated by a seven-minute halftime while the semifinals and finals had a ten-minute halftime. Knockout stage games needed to declare a winner, therefore if a game was tied at the end of regulation, one 15-minute, golden-goal overtime period would begin. If still tied after overtime, kicks from the mark would determine the winner.

== Qualification and selections ==
Each of the six regions received three automatic bids for the men's championship division and two automatic bids for the women's championship that they awarded to its members. The final bids for each division were considered "at-large", and were given out by NIRSA to teams, typically based on their regional tournament results and RPI.

The remaining teams participated in the open division, chosen on a first-come first-serve basis via online registration beginning on October 12, 2007, with a max of 20 teams per gender division.

=== Men's championship ===
Participating teams
| Region | Team | Appearance | Last Bid |
|---|---|---|---|
| I | Penn State | 8th | 2006 |
| I | Navy | 6th | 2004 |
| I | Penn | 3rd | 2005 |
| I | Boston College | 1st | Never |
| II | Georgia | 4th | 1999 |
| II | Vanderbilt | 4th | 2005 |
| II | Auburn | 3rd | 2006 |
| III | Illinois | 8th | 2006 |
| III | Michigan | 7th | 2006 |
| III | Indiana | 4th | 2006 |
| III | Ohio State | 4th | 1999 |
| III | UW Milwaukee | 1st | Never |
| IV | Texas | 11th | 2005 |
| IV | Texas A&M | 8th | 2006 |
| IV | Texas Tech | 6th | 2006 |
| IV | Kansas State | 3rd | 1997 |
| V | Colorado State | 11th | 2006 |
| V | Minnesota | 6th | 2006 |
| V | Augustana | 1st | Never |
| VI | Weber State | 8th | 2005 |
| VI | Arizona | 7th | 2006 |
| VI | UC Santa Barabara | 5th | 2006 |
| VI | San Diego State | 3rd | 2003 |
| VI | UCLA | 1st | Never |

=== Women's championship ===
Participating teams
| Region | Team | Appearance | Last Bid |
|---|---|---|---|
| I | Penn State | 13th | 2006 |
| I | Delaware | 6th | 2005 |
| I | Cornell | 2nd | 2006 |
| II | JMU | 10th | 2005 |
| II | Virginia Tech | 7th | 2006 |
| II | North Carolina | 5th | 2006 |
| III | Michigan | 9th | 2006 |
| III | Illinois | 7th | 2005 |
| III | Michigan State | 5th | 2006 |
| IV | Texas A&M | 10th | 2006 |
| IV | Texas | 9th | 2006 |
| V | Colorado | 13th | 2006 |
| V | Colorado State | 11th | 2006 |
| VI | San Diego State | 7th | 2006 |
| VI | UC-Santa Barbara | 7th | 2005 |
| VI | UCLA | 2nd | 2005 |

=== Men's open ===
Participating teams
| Region | Num | Team |
|---|---|---|
| I | 3 | Villanova, UConn, Towson |
| II | 6 | Florida, Alabama, UCF, Virginia Tech, JMU, Georgia Southern |
| III | 1 | Michigan State |
| IV | 3 | Kansas, Wichita State, Missouri |
| V | 1 | Iowa State |
| VI | 2 | Oregon, East Washington |

=== Women's open ===
Participating teams
| Region | Num | Team |
|---|---|---|
| I | 4 | Penn, Villanova, Vermont, Towson |
| II | 7 | MTSU, Florida, Vanderbilt, Virginia, Alabama, Georgia Tech, UCF |
| III | 0 | – |
| IV | 3 | Texas State, Kansas, LSU |
| V | 3 | Colorado, Iowa State, Colorado State |
| VI | 2 | Arizona, UC-Berkeley |

== Group stage ==
=== Men's championship ===
Group A
| Pos | Team | Pld | W | D | L | GF | GA | GD | Pts | Qualification |
|---|---|---|---|---|---|---|---|---|---|---|
| 1 | Indiana | 2 | 1 | 1 | 0 | 3 | 2 | +1 | 4 | Advanced to knockout stage |
| 2 | UCLA | 2 | 1 | 1 | 0 | 3 | 2 | +1 | 4 | Advanced to knockout stage |
| 3 | Auburn | 2 | 0 | 0 | 2 | 0 | 2 | −2 | 0 | Consolation |

Scores

| 8:00am CST | Auburn | 0–1 | UCLA | Field 1 |
| Thu, November 15 | | Report | | Stadium: University of West Florida; Pensacola, Florida |

| 2:00pm CST | UCLA | 2–2 | Indiana | Field 1 |
| Thu, November 15 | | Report | | Stadium: University of West Florida; Pensacola, Florida |

| 8:00pm CST | Indiana | 1–0 | Auburn | Field 1 |
| Thu, November 15 | | Report | | Stadium: University of West Florida; Pensacola, Florida |

| 11:45am CST | UCLA | 5–6; Kicks from the mark | Indiana | Field 10 |
| Fri, November 16 | | Report | | Stadium: University of West Florida; Pensacola, Florida |

Group B
| Pos | Team | Pld | W | D | L | GF | GA | GD | Pts | Qualification |
|---|---|---|---|---|---|---|---|---|---|---|
| 1 | Vanderbilt | 2 | 2 | 0 | 0 | 4 | 1 | +3 | 6 | Advanced to knockout stage |
| 2 | Minnesota | 2 | 0 | 1 | 1 | 1 | 2 | −1 | 1 | Advanced to knockout stage |
| 3 | San Diego State | 2 | 0 | 1 | 1 | 0 | 2 | −2 | 1 | Consolation |

Scores

| 8:00am CST | Vanderbilt | 2–0 | San Diego State | Field 2 |
| Thu, November 15 | | Report | | Stadium: University of West Florida; Pensacola, Florida |

| 2:00pm CST | San Diego State | 0–0 | Minnesota | Field 2 |
| Thu, November 15 | | Report | | Stadium: University of West Florida; Pensacola, Florida |

| 8:00pm CST | Minnesota | 1–2 | Vanderbilt | Field 2 |
| Thu, November 15 | | Report | | Stadium: University of West Florida; Pensacola, Florida |

Group C
| Pos | Team | Pld | W | D | L | GF | GA | GD | Pts | Qualification |
|---|---|---|---|---|---|---|---|---|---|---|
| 1 | Texas Tech | 2 | 2 | 0 | 0 | 5 | 1 | +4 | 6 | Advanced to knockout stage |
| 2 | UC-Santa Barbara | 2 | 1 | 0 | 1 | 4 | 2 | +2 | 3 | Advanced to knockout stage |
| 3 | Augustana | 2 | 0 | 0 | 2 | 0 | 6 | −6 | 0 | Consolation |

Scores

| 8:00am CST | UC-Santa Barbara | 3–0 | Augustana | Field 3 |
| Thu, November 15 | | Report | | Stadium: University of West Florida; Pensacola, Florida |

| 2:00pm CST | Augustana | 0–3 | Texas Tech | Field 3 |
| Thu, November 15 | | Report | | Stadium: University of West Florida; Pensacola, Florida |

| 8:00pm CST | Texas Tech | 2–1 | UC-Santa Barbara | Field 3 |
| Thu, November 15 | | Report | | Stadium: University of West Florida; Pensacola, Florida |

Group D
| Pos | Team | Pld | W | D | L | GF | GA | GD | Pts | Qualification |
|---|---|---|---|---|---|---|---|---|---|---|
| 1 | Penn State | 2 | 2 | 0 | 0 | 5 | 1 | +4 | 6 | Advanced to knockout stage |
| 2 | UW-Milwaukee | 2 | 1 | 0 | 1 | 3 | 2 | +1 | 3 | Advanced to knockout stage |
| 3 | Georgia | 2 | 0 | 0 | 2 | 0 | 5 | −5 | 0 | Consolation |

Scores

| 8:00am CST | Penn State | 3–0 | Georgia | Field 4 |
| Thu, November 15 | | Report | | Stadium: University of West Florida; Pensacola, Florida |

| 2:00pm CST | Georgia | 0–2 | UW-Milwaukee | Field 4 |
| Thu, November 15 | | Report | | Stadium: University of West Florida; Pensacola, Florida |

| 8:00pm CST | UW-Milwaukee | 1–2 | Penn State | Field 4 |
| Thu, November 15 | | Report | | Stadium: University of West Florida; Pensacola, Florida |

Group E
| Pos | Team | Pld | W | D | L | GF | GA | GD | Pts | Qualification |
|---|---|---|---|---|---|---|---|---|---|---|
| 1 | Texas | 2 | 2 | 0 | 0 | 8 | 0 | +8 | 6 | Advanced to knockout stage |
| 2 | Illinois | 2 | 1 | 0 | 1 | 2 | 4 | −2 | 3 | Advanced to knockout stage |
| 3 | Penn | 2 | 0 | 0 | 2 | 1 | 7 | −6 | 0 | Consolation |

Scores

| 8:00am CST | Texas | 5–0 | Penn | Field 5 |
| Thu, November 15 | | Report | | Stadium: University of West Florida; Pensacola, Florida |

| 2:00pm CST | Penn | 1–2 | Illinois | Field 5 |
| Thu, November 15 | | Report | | Stadium: University of West Florida; Pensacola, Florida |

| 8:00pm CST | Illinois | 0–3 | Texas | Field 5 |
| Thu, November 15 | | Report | | Stadium: University of West Florida; Pensacola, Florida |

Group F
| Pos | Team | Pld | W | D | L | GF | GA | GD | Pts | Qualification |
|---|---|---|---|---|---|---|---|---|---|---|
| 1 | Arizona | 2 | 2 | 0 | 0 | 4 | 1 | +3 | 6 | Advanced to knockout stage |
| 2 | Colorado State | 2 | 1 | 0 | 1 | 4 | 2 | +2 | 3 | Advanced to knockout stage |
| 3 | Navy | 2 | 0 | 0 | 2 | 0 | 5 | −5 | 0 | Consolation |

Scores

| 8:00am CST | Colorado State | 1–2 | Arizona | Field 6 |
| Thu, November 15 | | Report | | Stadium: University of West Florida; Pensacola, Florida |

| 2:00pm CST | Arizona | 2–0 | Navy | Field 6 |
| Thu, November 15 | | Report | | Stadium: University of West Florida; Pensacola, Florida |

| 8:00pm CST | Navy | 0–3 | Colorado State | Field 6 |
| Thu, November 15 | | Report | | Stadium: University of West Florida; Pensacola, Florida |

Group G
| Pos | Team | Pld | W | D | L | GF | GA | GD | Pts | Qualification |
|---|---|---|---|---|---|---|---|---|---|---|
| 1 | Weber State | 2 | 1 | 1 | 0 | 3 | 1 | +2 | 4 | Advanced to knockout stage |
| 2 | Ohio State | 2 | 1 | 1 | 0 | 4 | 3 | +1 | 4 | Advanced to knockout stage |
| 3 | Texas A&M | 2 | 0 | 0 | 2 | 2 | 5 | −3 | 0 | Consolation |

Scores

| 8:00am CST | Texas A&M | 0–2 | Weber State | Field 9 |
| Thu, November 15 | | Report | | Stadium: University of West Florida; Pensacola, Florida |

| 2:00pm CST | Weber State | 1–1 | Ohio State | Field 9 |
| Thu, November 15 | | Report | | Stadium: University of West Florida; Pensacola, Florida |

| 8:00pm CST | Ohio State | 3–2 | Texas A&M | Field 9 |
| Thu, November 15 | | Report | | Stadium: University of West Florida; Pensacola, Florida |

Group H
| Pos | Team | Pld | W | D | L | GF | GA | GD | Pts | Qualification |
|---|---|---|---|---|---|---|---|---|---|---|
| 1 | Boston College | 2 | 1 | 1 | 0 | 4 | 3 | +1 | 4 | Advanced to knockout stage |
| 2 | Michigan | 2 | 1 | 1 | 0 | 2 | 1 | +1 | 4 | Advanced to knockout stage |
| 3 | Kansas State | 2 | 0 | 0 | 2 | 2 | 4 | −2 | 0 | Consolation |

Scores

| 8:00am CST | Boston College | 1–1 | Michigan | Field 10 |
| Thu, November 15 | | Report | | Stadium: University of West Florida; Pensacola, Florida |

| 2:00pm CST | Michigan | 1–0 | Kansas State | Field 10 |
| Thu, November 15 | | Report | | Stadium: University of West Florida; Pensacola, Florida |

| 8:00pm CST | Kansas State | 2–3 | Boston College | Field 10 |
| Thu, November 15 | | Report | | Stadium: University of West Florida; Pensacola, Florida |

=== Women's championship ===
Group A
| Pos | Team | Pld | W | D | L | GF | GA | GD | Pts | Qualification |
|---|---|---|---|---|---|---|---|---|---|---|
| 1 | Michigan | 3 | 2 | 0 | 1 | 6 | 3 | +3 | 6 | Advanced to knockout stage |
| 2 | Delaware | 3 | 1 | 2 | 0 | 3 | 2 | +1 | 5 | Advanced to knockout stage |
| 3 | North Carolina | 3 | 1 | 1 | 1 | 5 | 5 | 0 | 4 | |
| 4 | Colorado State | 3 | 1 | 0 | 2 | 1 | 5 | −4 | 3 | |

Scores

| 10:00am CST | Michigan | 3–1 | North Carolina | Field 5 |
| Thu, November 15 | | Report | | Stadium: University of West Florida; Pensacola, Florida |

| 10:00am CST | Delaware | 0–0 | Colorado State | Field 6 |
| Thu, November 15 | | Report | | Stadium: University of West Florida; Pensacola, Florida |

| 4:00pm CST | Michigan | 2–0 | Colorado State | Field 5 |
| Thu, November 15 | | Report | | Stadium: University of West Florida; Pensacola, Florida |

| 4:00pm CST | North Carolina | 1–1 | Delaware | Field 6 |
| Thu, November 15 | | Report | | Stadium: University of West Florida; Pensacola, Florida |

| 8:00am CST | Delaware | 2–1 | Michigan | Field 5 |
| Fri, November 16 | | Report | | Stadium: University of West Florida; Pensacola, Florida |

| 8:00am CST | Colorado State | 1–3 | North Carolina | Field 6 |
| Fri, November 16 | | Report | | Stadium: University of West Florida; Pensacola, Florida |

Group B
| Pos | Team | Pld | W | D | L | GF | GA | GD | Pts | Qualification |
|---|---|---|---|---|---|---|---|---|---|---|
| 1 | Michigan State | 3 | 2 | 0 | 1 | 4 | 3 | +1 | 6 | Advanced to knockout stage |
| 2 | UC-Santa Barbara | 3 | 2 | 0 | 1 | 7 | 2 | +5 | 6 | Advanced to knockout stage |
| 3 | Texas A&M | 3 | 1 | 1 | 1 | 1 | 3 | −2 | 4 | |
| 4 | Cornell | 3 | 0 | 1 | 2 | 1 | 5 | −4 | 1 | |

Scores

| 10:00am CST | UC-Santa Barbara | 1–2 | Michigan State | Field 9 |
| Thu, November 15 | | Report | | Stadium: University of West Florida; Pensacola, Florida |

| 10:00am CST | Texas A&M | 0–0 | Cornell | Field 10 |
| Thu, November 15 | | Report | | Stadium: University of West Florida; Pensacola, Florida |

| 4:00pm CST | UC-Santa Barbara | 3–0 | Cornell | Field 9 |
| Thu, November 15 | | Report | | Stadium: University of West Florida; Pensacola, Florida |

| 4:00pm CST | Michigan State | 0–1 | Texas A&M | Field 10 |
| Thu, November 15 | | Report | | Stadium: University of West Florida; Pensacola, Florida |

| 8:00am CST | Texas A&M | 0–3 | UC-Santa Barbara | Field 9 |
| Fri, November 16 | | Report | | Stadium: University of West Florida; Pensacola, Florida |

| 8:00am CST | Cornell | 1–2 | Michigan State | Field 10 |
| Fri, November 16 | | Report | | Stadium: University of West Florida; Pensacola, Florida |

Group C
| Pos | Team | Pld | W | D | L | GF | GA | GD | Pts | Qualification |
|---|---|---|---|---|---|---|---|---|---|---|
| 1 | San Diego State | 3 | 3 | 0 | 0 | 5 | 0 | +5 | 9 | Advanced to knockout stage |
| 2 | Colorado | 3 | 1 | 1 | 1 | 4 | 2 | +2 | 4 | Advanced to knockout stage |
| 3 | JMU | 3 | 1 | 0 | 2 | 2 | 6 | −4 | 3 | |
| 4 | Illinois | 3 | 0 | 1 | 2 | 1 | 4 | −3 | 1 | |

Scores

| 12:00pm CST | Colorado | 1–1 | Illinois | Field 5 |
| Thu, November 15 | | Report | | Stadium: University of West Florida; Pensacola, Florida |

| 12:00pm CST | JMU | 0–3 | San Diego State | Field 6 |
| Thu, November 15 | | Report | | Stadium: University of West Florida; Pensacola, Florida |

| 6:00pm CST | Colorado | 0–1 | San Diego State | Field 5 |
| Thu, November 15 | | Report | | Stadium: University of West Florida; Pensacola, Florida |

| 6:00pm CST | Illinois | 0–2 | JMU | Field 6 |
| Thu, November 15 | | Report | | Stadium: University of West Florida; Pensacola, Florida |

| 10:00am CST | JMU | 0–3 | Colorado | Field 5 |
| Fri, November 16 | | Report | | Stadium: University of West Florida; Pensacola, Florida |

| 10:00am CST | San Diego State | 1–0 | Illinois | Field 6 |
| Fri, November 16 | | Report | | Stadium: University of West Florida; Pensacola, Florida |

Group D
| Pos | Team | Pld | W | D | L | GF | GA | GD | Pts | Qualification |
|---|---|---|---|---|---|---|---|---|---|---|
| 1 | Penn State | 3 | 2 | 0 | 1 | 4 | 2 | +2 | 6 | Advanced to knockout stage |
| 2 | Virginia Tech | 3 | 1 | 1 | 1 | 3 | 3 | 0 | 4 | Advanced to knockout stage |
| 3 | UCLA | 3 | 1 | 1 | 1 | 2 | 2 | 0 | 4 | |
| 4 | Texas | 3 | 1 | 0 | 2 | 1 | 3 | −2 | 3 | |

Scores

| 12:00pm CST | Texas | 0–2 | Penn State | Field 9 |
| Thu, November 15 | | Report | | Stadium: University of West Florida; Pensacola, Florida |

| 12:00pm CST | Virginia Tech | 1–1 | UCLA | Field 10 |
| Thu, November 15 | | Report | | Stadium: University of West Florida; Pensacola, Florida |

| 6:00pm CST | Texas | 0–1 | UCLA | Field 9 |
| Thu, November 15 | | Report | | Stadium: University of West Florida; Pensacola, Florida |

| 6:00pm CST | Penn State | 1–2 | Virginia Tech | Field 10 |
| Thu, November 15 | | Report | | Stadium: University of West Florida; Pensacola, Florida |

| 10:00am CST | Virginia Tech | 0–1 | Texas | Field 9 |
| Fri, November 16 | | Report | | Stadium: University of West Florida; Pensacola, Florida |

| 10:00am CST | UCLA | 0–1 | Penn State | Field 10 |
| Fri, November 16 | | Report | | Stadium: University of West Florida; Pensacola, Florida |

=== Men's open ===
Group A
| Pos | Team | Pld | W | D | L | GF | GA | GD | Pts | Qualification |
|---|---|---|---|---|---|---|---|---|---|---|
| 1 | Michigan State | 3 | 3 | 0 | 0 | 7 | 0 | +7 | 9 | Advanced to knockout stage |
| 2 | Florida | 3 | 2 | 0 | 1 | 10 | 3 | +4 | 6 | Advanced to knockout stage |
| 3 | Alabama | 3 | 1 | 0 | 2 | 5 | 7 | −2 | 3 | |
| 4 | Villanova | 3 | 0 | 0 | 3 | 2 | 14 | −9 | 0 | |

Scores

| 10:00am CST | Florida | 2–0 | Alabama | Field 2 |
| Thu, November 15 | | Report | | Stadium: University of West Florida; Pensacola, Florida |

| 10:00am CST | Michigan State | 1–0 | Villanova | Field 4 |
| Thu, November 15 | | Report | | Stadium: University of West Florida; Pensacola, Florida |

| 4:00pm CST | Florida | 8–0 | Villanova | Field 2 |
| Thu, November 15 | | Report | | Stadium: University of West Florida; Pensacola, Florida |

| 4:00pm CST | Alabama | 0–3 | Michigan State | Field 4 |
| Thu, November 15 | | Report | | Stadium: University of West Florida; Pensacola, Florida |

| 8:00am CST | Michigan State | 3–0 | Florida | Field 2 |
| Fri, November 16 | | Report | | Stadium: University of West Florida; Pensacola, Florida |

| 8:00am CST | Villanova | 2–5 | Alabama | Field 4 |
| Fri, November 16 | | Report | | Stadium: University of West Florida; Pensacola, Florida |

Group B
| Pos | Team | Pld | W | D | L | GF | GA | GD | Pts | Qualification |
|---|---|---|---|---|---|---|---|---|---|---|
| 1 | Kansas | 3 | 3 | 0 | 0 | 5 | 1 | +4 | 9 | Advanced to knockout stage |
| 2 | UConn | 3 | 1 | 1 | 1 | 6 | 4 | +2 | 4 | Advanced to knockout stage |
| 3 | Iowa State | 3 | 1 | 0 | 2 | 3 | 6 | −3 | 3 | |
| 4 | UCF | 3 | 0 | 1 | 2 | 0 | 3 | −3 | 1 | |

Scores

| 10:00am CST | Kansas | 1–0 | UCF | Field 7 |
| Thu, November 15 | | Report | | Stadium: University of West Florida; Pensacola, Florida |

| 10:00am CST | UConn | 5–1 | Iowa State | Field 8 |
| Thu, November 15 | | Report | | Stadium: University of West Florida; Pensacola, Florida |

| 4:00pm CST | Kansas | 1–0 | Iowa State | Field 7 |
| Thu, November 15 | | Report | | Stadium: University of West Florida; Pensacola, Florida |

| 4:00pm CST | UCF | 0–0 | UConn | Field 8 |
| Thu, November 15 | | Report | | Stadium: University of West Florida; Pensacola, Florida |

| 8:00am CST | UConn | 1–3 | Kansas | Field 7 |
| Fri, November 16 | | Report | | Stadium: University of West Florida; Pensacola, Florida |

| 8:00am CST | Iowa State | 2–0 | UCF | Field 8 |
| Fri, November 16 | | Report | | Stadium: University of West Florida; Pensacola, Florida |

Group C
| Pos | Team | Pld | W | D | L | GF | GA | GD | Pts | Qualification |
|---|---|---|---|---|---|---|---|---|---|---|
| 1 | Virginia Tech | 3 | 1 | 2 | 0 | 2 | 1 | +1 | 5 | Advanced to knockout stage |
| 2 | Oregon | 3 | 1 | 2 | 0 | 1 | 0 | +1 | 5 | Advanced to knockout stage |
| 3 | Towson | 3 | 1 | 1 | 1 | 4 | 2 | +2 | 4 | |
| 4 | Wichita State | 3 | 0 | 1 | 2 | 0 | 4 | −4 | 1 | |

Scores

| 12:00pm CST | Oregon | 1–0 | Towson | Field 2 |
| Thu, November 15 | | Report | | Stadium: University of West Florida; Pensacola, Florida |

| 12:00pm CST | Virginia Tech | 1–0 | Wichita State | Field 4 |
| Thu, November 15 | | Report | | Stadium: University of West Florida; Pensacola, Florida |

| 6:00pm CST | Oregon | 0–0 | Wichita State | Field 2 |
| Thu, November 15 | | Report | | Stadium: University of West Florida; Pensacola, Florida |

| 6:00pm CST | Towson | 1–1 | Virginia Tech | Field 4 |
| Thu, November 15 | | Report | | Stadium: University of West Florida; Pensacola, Florida |

| 10:00am CST | Virginia Tech | 0–0 | Oregon | Field 2 |
| Fri, November 16 | | Report | | Stadium: University of West Florida; Pensacola, Florida |

| 10:00am CST | Wichita State | 0–3 | Towson | Field 4 |
| Fri, November 16 | | Report | | Stadium: University of West Florida; Pensacola, Florida |

Group D
| Pos | Team | Pld | W | D | L | GF | GA | GD | Pts | Qualification |
|---|---|---|---|---|---|---|---|---|---|---|
| 1 | Missouri | 3 | 2 | 1 | 0 | 9 | 3 | +6 | 7 | Advanced to knockout stage |
| 2 | JMU | 3 | 1 | 2 | 0 | 3 | 1 | +2 | 5 | Advanced to knockout stage |
| 3 | Georgia Southern | 3 | 0 | 2 | 1 | 1 | 3 | −2 | 2 | |
| 4 | East Washington | 3 | 0 | 1 | 2 | 1 | 7 | −6 | 1 | |

Scores

| 12:00pm CST | Missouri | 5–1 | East Washington | Field 7 |
| Thu, November 15 | | Report | | Stadium: University of West Florida; Pensacola, Florida |

| 12:00pm CST | JMU | 0–0 | Georgia Southern | Field 8 |
| Thu, November 15 | | Report | | Stadium: University of West Florida; Pensacola, Florida |

| 6:00pm CST | Missouri | 3–1 | Georgia Southern | Field 7 |
| Thu, November 15 | | Report | | Stadium: University of West Florida; Pensacola, Florida |

| 6:00pm CST | East Washington | 0–2 | JMU | Field 8 |
| Thu, November 15 | | Report | | Stadium: University of West Florida; Pensacola, Florida |

| 10:00am CST | JMU | 1–1 | Missouri | Field 7 |
| Fri, November 16 | | Report | | Stadium: University of West Florida; Pensacola, Florida |

| 10:00am CST | Georgia Southern | 0–0 | East Washington | Field 8 |
| Fri, November 16 | | Report | | Stadium: University of West Florida; Pensacola, Florida |

=== Women's open ===
Group A
| Pos | Team | Pld | W | D | L | GF | GA | GD | Pts | Qualification |
|---|---|---|---|---|---|---|---|---|---|---|
| 1 | Colorado | 3 | 2 | 1 | 0 | 6 | 2 | +4 | 7 | Advanced to knockout stage |
| 2 | Texas State | 3 | 2 | 0 | 1 | 6 | 4 | +2 | 6 | Advanced to knockout stage |
| 3 | Penn | 3 | 1 | 0 | 2 | 5 | 4 | +1 | 3 | |
| 4 | MTSU | 3 | 0 | 1 | 2 | 2 | 9 | −7 | 1 | |

Scores

| 8:00am CST | Colorado | 3–0 | Texas State | Field 1 |
| Thu, November 15 | | Report | | Stadium: University of West Florida; Pensacola, Florida |

| 8:00am CST | MTSU | 0–4 | Penn | Field 3 |
| Thu, November 15 | | Report | | Stadium: University of West Florida; Pensacola, Florida |

| 4:00pm CST | Colorado | 2–1 | Penn | Field 1 |
| Thu, November 15 | | Report | | Stadium: University of West Florida; Pensacola, Florida |

| 4:00pm CST | Texas State | 4–1 | MTSU | Field 3 |
| Thu, November 15 | | Report | | Stadium: University of West Florida; Pensacola, Florida |

| 8:00am CST | MTSU | 1–1 | Colorado | Field 1 |
| Fri, November 16 | | Report | | Stadium: University of West Florida; Pensacola, Florida |

| 8:00am CST | Penn | 0–2 | Texas State | Field 3 |
| Fri, November 16 | | Report | | Stadium: University of West Florida; Pensacola, Florida |

Group B
| Pos | Team | Pld | W | D | L | GF | GA | GD | Pts | Qualification |
|---|---|---|---|---|---|---|---|---|---|---|
| 1 | Villanova | 3 | 3 | 0 | 0 | 10 | 2 | +8 | 9 | Advanced to knockout stage |
| 2 | Kansas | 3 | 1 | 1 | 1 | 4 | 3 | +1 | 4 | |
| 3 | Florida | 3 | 1 | 1 | 1 | 2 | 3 | −1 | 4 | |
| 4 | Vermont | 3 | 0 | 0 | 3 | 1 | 9 | −8 | 0 | |

Scores

| 8:00am CST | Villanova | 4–1 | Vermont | Field 11 |
| Thu, November 15 | | Report | | Stadium: University of West Florida; Pensacola, Florida |

| 8:00am CST | Florida | 0–0 | Kansas | Field 12 |
| Thu, November 15 | | Report | | Stadium: University of West Florida; Pensacola, Florida |

| 4:00pm CST | Villanova | 3–1 | Kansas | Field 11 |
| Thu, November 15 | | Report | | Stadium: University of West Florida; Pensacola, Florida |

| 4:00pm CST | Vermont | 0–2 | Florida | Field 12 |
| Thu, November 15 | | Report | | Stadium: University of West Florida; Pensacola, Florida |

| 8:00am CST | Florida | 0–3 | Villanova | Field 11 |
| Fri, November 16 | | Report | | Stadium: University of West Florida; Pensacola, Florida |

| 8:00am CST | Kansas | 3–0 | Vermont | Field 12 |
| Fri, November 16 | | Report | | Stadium: University of West Florida; Pensacola, Florida |

Group C
| Pos | Team | Pld | W | D | L | GF | GA | GD | Pts | Qualification |
|---|---|---|---|---|---|---|---|---|---|---|
| 1 | Arizona | 2 | 1 | 1 | 0 | 6 | 0 | +6 | 7 | Advanced to knockout stage |
| 2 | Vanderbilt | 2 | 1 | 1 | 0 | 2 | 0 | +2 | 7 | Advanced to knockout stage |
| 3 | Iowa State | 2 | 0 | 0 | 2 | 1 | 6 | −5 | 3 | |
| 4 | Unable to field team, all teams awarded 3 points and +1 GD | | | | | | | | | |

Scores

| 10:00am CST | Vanderbilt | 1–0 | Iowa State | Field 12 |
| Thu, November 15 | | Report | | Stadium: University of West Florida; Pensacola, Florida |

| 6:00pm CST | Arizona | 5–0 | Iowa State | Field 11 |
| Thu, November 15 | | Report | | Stadium: University of West Florida; Pensacola, Florida |

| 10:00am CST | Vanderbilt | 0–0 | Arizona | Field 11 |
| Fri, November 16 | | Report | | Stadium: University of West Florida; Pensacola, Florida |

Group D
| Pos | Team | Pld | W | D | L | GF | GA | GD | Pts | Qualification |
|---|---|---|---|---|---|---|---|---|---|---|
| 1 | Virginia | 3 | 2 | 1 | 0 | 4 | 0 | +4 | 7 | Advanced to knockout stage |
| 2 | Alabama | 3 | 2 | 1 | 0 | 3 | 0 | +3 | 7 | Advanced to knockout stage |
| 3 | Colorado State | 3 | 1 | 0 | 2 | 3 | 3 | 0 | 3 | |
| 4 | LSU | 3 | 0 | 0 | 3 | 1 | 8 | −7 | 0 | |

Scores

| 12:00pm CST | Colorado State | 0–1 | Alabama | Field 1 |
| Thu, November 15 | | Report | | Stadium: University of West Florida; Pensacola, Florida |

| 12:00pm CST | Virginia | 3–0 | LSU | Field 3 |
| Thu, November 15 | | Report | | Stadium: University of West Florida; Pensacola, Florida |

| 8:00pm CST | Colorado State | 3–1 | LSU | Field 1 |
| Thu, November 15 | | Report | | Stadium: University of West Florida; Pensacola, Florida |

| 8:00pm CST | Alabama | 0–0 | Virginia | Field 3 |
| Thu, November 15 | | Report | | Stadium: University of West Florida; Pensacola, Florida |

| 12:00pm CST | Virginia | 1–0 | Colorado State | Field 1 |
| Fri, November 16 | | Report | | Stadium: University of West Florida; Pensacola, Florida |

| 12:00pm CST | LSU | 0–2 | Alabama | Field 3 |
| Fri, November 16 | | Report | | Stadium: University of West Florida; Pensacola, Florida |

Group E
| Pos | Team | Pld | W | D | L | GF | GA | GD | Pts | Qualification |
|---|---|---|---|---|---|---|---|---|---|---|
| 1 | UC-Berkeley | 3 | 3 | 0 | 0 | 10 | 0 | +9 | 9 | Advanced to knockout stage |
| 2 | Towson | 3 | 1 | 1 | 1 | 2 | 1 | +1 | 4 | |
| 3 | Georgia Tech | 3 | 1 | 0 | 2 | 4 | 7 | −3 | 3 | |
| 4 | UCF | 3 | 0 | 1 | 2 | 2 | 10 | −7 | 1 | |

Scores

| 12:00pm CST | Georgia Tech | 4–2 | UCF | Field 11 |
| Thu, November 15 | | Report | | Stadium: University of West Florida; Pensacola, Florida |

| 12:00pm CST | UC-Berkeley | 1–0 | Towson | Field 12 |
| Thu, November 15 | | Report | | Stadium: University of West Florida; Pensacola, Florida |

| 8:00pm CST | Georgia Tech | 0–2 | Towson | Field 11 |
| Thu, November 15 | | Report | | Stadium: University of West Florida; Pensacola, Florida |

| 8:00pm CST | UCF | 0–6 | UC-Berkeley | Field 12 |
| Thu, November 15 | | Report | | Stadium: University of West Florida; Pensacola, Florida |

| 12:00pm CST | UC-Berkeley | 3–0 | Georgia Tech | Field 11 |
| Fri, November 16 | | Report | | Stadium: University of West Florida; Pensacola, Florida |

| 12:00pm CST | Towson | 0–0 | UCF | Field 12 |
| Fri, November 16 | | Report | | Stadium: University of West Florida; Pensacola, Florida |

== Tournament bracket ==
=== Men's championship ===
Sweet 16
Fri • 12:00pm • Field 7
Indiana | 2
UW-Milwaukee | 0
Fri • 12:00pm • Field 2
Illinois | 2
Boston College | 0
Fri • 12:00pm • Field 8
Weber State (pen.) | 0 (4)
Colorado State | 0 (3)
Fri • 12:00pm • Field 4
UC-Santa Barbara | 1
Vanderbilt | 0
Fri • 12:00pm • Field 5
Texas Tech | 2
Minnesota | 1
Fri • 12:00pm • Field 6
Ohio State | 1
Arizona | 2
Fri • 12:00pm • Field 9
Texas | 1 (3)
Michigan (pen.) | 1 (4)
Fri • 12:00pm • Field 10
UCLA | 1
Penn State | 0

Quarterfinals
Fri • 8:00pm • Field 7
Indiana | 1 (2)
Illinois (pen.) | 1 (4)
Fri • 8:00pm • Field 8
Weber State | 0
UC-Santa Barbara | 1
Fri • 8:00pm • Field 9
Texas Tech | 4
Arizona | 0
Fri • 8:00pm • Field 10
Michigan (pen.) | 1 (9)
UCLA | 1 (8)

Semifinals
Sat • 10:00am • Field 4
Illinois | 0 (3)
UC-Santa Barbara (pen.) | 0 (5)
Sat • 10:00am • Field 5
Texas Tech | 2
Michigan | 1

Final
Sat • 5:00pm • Field 10
UC-Santa Barbara (pen.) | 0 (4)
Texas Tech | 0 (1)

==== Men's consolation ====
Quarterfinals
Fri • 6:00pm • Field 7
Auburn | 0
Penn | 1
Fri • 6:00pm • Field 8
Navy | 2
San Diego State | 0
Fri • 6:00pm • Field 9
Augustana | 1
Texas A&M | 4
Fri • 6:00pm • Field 10
Kansas State | 2
Georgia | 3

Semifinals
Sat • 8:00am • Field 5
Penn | 1
Navy | 0
Sat • 8:00am • Field 6
Texas A&M | 3
Georgia | 0

Final
Sat • 1:00pm • Field 9
Penn | 0
Texas A&M | 1

=== Women's championship ===
Quarterfinals
Fri • 4:00pm • Field 5
Michigan | 1
UC-Santa Barbara | 3
Fri • 4:00pm • Field 6
Colorado | 0
Penn State | 1
Fri • 6:00pm • Field 5
San Diego State | 2
Virginia Tech | 1
Fri • 6:00pm • Field 6
Delaware | 0
Michigan State | 3

Semifinals
Sat • 10:00am • Field 7
UC-Santa Barbara (pen.) | 0 (4)
Penn State | 0 (1)
Sat • 10:00am • Field 8
San Diego State | 2
Michigan State | 0

Final
Sat • 3:00pm • Field 10
UC-Santa Barbara (pen.) | 1 (4)
San Diego State | 1 (1)

=== Men's open ===
Quarterfinals
Fri • 4:00pm • Field 2
Michigan State | 3
UConn | 2
Fri • 4:00pm • Field 4
Oregon | 1
Missouri | 2
Fri • 6:00pm • Field 2
Virginia Tech | 0
JMU | 2
Fri • 6:00pm • Field 4
Florida | 1
Kansas | 2

Semifinals
Sat • 8:00am • Field 2
Michigan State | 1 (1)
Missouri (pen.) | 1 (4)
Sat • 8:00am • Field 4
JMU | 0
Kansas | 2

Final
Sat • 1:00pm • Field 8
Missouri (pen.) | 1 (4)
Kansas | 1 (2)

=== Women's open ===
Quarterfinals
Fri • 4:00pm • Field 3
UC-Berkeley | 3
Alabama | 0
Fri • 4:00pm • Field 4
Arizona | 1
Colorado | 0
Fri • 6:00pm • Field 3
Virginia | 2
Vanderbilt | 0
Fri • 6:00pm • Field 4
Texas State | 0
Villanova | 1

Semifinals
Sat • 8:00am • Field 1
UC-Berkeley | 3
Arizona | 0
Sat • 8:00am • Field 2
Virginia | 0
Villanova | 2

Final
Sat • 1:00pm • Field 7
UC-Berkeley | 1
Villanova | 3
