= 2002 NIRSA National Soccer Championship =

- League: NIRSA
- Sport: Soccer
- Site: Kern County Soccer Complex; Bakersfield, California
- Duration: November 21–23, 2002
- Number of teams: 16 (men's championship); 16 (women's championship); 16 (men's open); 16 (women's open)
- Results: Official Results

Men's Championship Division
- Score: 2–0
- Champion: Weber State (1st title, 1st title game)
- Runners-up: BYU (6th title game)
- Season MVP: Scott Badger (Weber State)

Women's Championship Division
- Score: 2–1
- Champion: Michigan (2nd title, 3rd title game)
- Runners-up: Colorado (3rd title game)
- Season MVP: Katie Keller (Michigan)

Men's Open Division
- Score: 4–0
- Champion: Texas A&M (1st title, 1st title game)
- Runners-up: Penn State (1st title game)
- Season MVP: Joe Shine (Texas A&M)

Women's Open Division
- Score: 2–1 (a.e.t.)
- Champion: Delaware (1st title, 1st title game)
- Runners-up: Arizona (1st title game)
- Top seed: Sara White (Delaware)

NIRSA national soccer championships seasons
- ← 2001 2003 →

The 2002 NIRSA national soccer championship was the 9th NIRSA National Soccer Championships, the annual national championships for United States-based, collegiate club soccer teams organized by NIRSA. It took place at the Kern County Soccer Complex in Bakersfield, California from Thursday, November 21 to Saturday, November 23, 2002.

== Overview ==
=== Men's championship ===
In the finals, 5-time, and reigning, champions BYU would face in-state rivals Weber State. Preceding the tournament, the teams had already played twice with BYU winning the first match 1–0 and both teams tying the second. In the group stage, BYU would win all three of their matches, first beating Indiana 2–0, then Delaware 5–1, and finally Rice 2–1. Meanwhile, Weber State would win their opener against Virginia 3–1, then would lose their second match 2–0 to Michigan, but would win their finale against Kansas 2–1 to secure second in the group.

In the knockout round, Weber State would win their first two games by a score of 3–1, first against Arizona in the quarterfinals and then against Delaware in the semifinals, to advance to their first finals. Meanwhile, BYU would win their quarterfinal matchup 6–2 against Illinois followed by a 3–0 win against Michigan to reach their 6th finals in their 7th tournament appearance, winning all 5 of their previous finals appearances.

In the finals, Tyson Craythorne of Weber State would open the scoring six minutes into the game giving BYU their first deficit of the tournament. Near the end of match, BYU's goalkeeper, Erik Walunas, would receive a red card denying Weber State of an obvious goal scoring opportunity on a breakaway. Shortly after, in the final minutes of the match, Weber State's Curtis Whitesides would score the second goal of the game and secure Weber State's first NIRSA title. Weber State's goalkeeper, Scott Badger, would be named the tournament's MVP after maintaining a shutout despite facing 24 shots. Following this tournament, BYU would move to the Premier Development League and would not play at the club level again until 2015.

=== Women's championship ===
In the finals, 2000 champions, Michigan, would face two-time champion Colorado in a rematch of the 1999 semifinals which Michigan won 1–0, the 2000 quarterfinals that Michigan won in penalties, and their group stage finale in this tournament. In the group stage, both teams would beat Maryland and Texas A&M by the same score of 3–0 and 4–1, respectively. These results secured a knockout round berth for both teams going into the group stage finale but following a 2–2 draw, both teams were level on all tie-breaking metrics, meaning a coin flip would need to be used to determine group seeding. Michigan would lose the coin flip and end up 2nd in the group, meaning they'd have to play Group A winners, JMU, in the quarterfinals while Colorado would face Group D runners-up, Virginia Tech.

In the quarterfinals, Michigan would win 1–0 over JMU while Colorado would win 3–1 over Virginia Tech. In the semifinals, Michigan would beat San Diego State 3–0 while Colorado would beat two-time champion Miami (OH) 2–0. Both teams would make their third finals appearance.

In the finals, Colorado would open the scoring 5 minutes into the second half but Michigan would level the match 15 minutes later with a goal from junior, Bethany Dalby, on a penalty kick after it was deemed Colorado handled the ball in their own box. With five minutes remaining in the match, sophomore Gwen Reyes of Michigan would score what would go on to be the game-winning goal. Michigan's Katie Keller would be named tournament MVP and Michigan would become the fourth team to win two national titles following Miami (OH), Colorado, and Colorado State.

=== Men's open ===
In the finals, Texas A&M would make their first finals and play against 2000 championship division winners, Penn State. Prior to this, in the group stage, both teams would top their groups after winning all three games, with Texas A&M defeating Oregon, Grand Valley State, and UC-Santa Barbara by a score of 1–0, 3–1, and 1–0 respectively and with Penn State defeating Colorado, Central Washington, and Wichita State by a score of 2–1, 2–0, and 5–1 respectively. In the quarterfinals, Texas A&M would defeat two-time open champions, JMU, by a score of 1–0 then would beat Colorado 3–0 in the semifinals. Meanwhile, Penn State would beat UC-Santa Barbara 1–0 in the quarterfinals then beat Utah Valley State 2–0. In the finals, Texas A&M would defeat Penn State by their largest margin of victory in a 4–0 win and claim their first open title. Texas A&M's Joe Shine would be named the tournament's MVP.

=== Women's open ===
In the finals, Delaware and Arizona would meet in what would be the first finals for both teams. In the group stage, both teams would win all 3 games with Arizona beating UC-Davis, Cornell, and Colorado "Black" by scores of 4–0, 3–0, and 2–1, respectively and with Delaware beating Colorado School of the Mines, Long Beach State (who did not attend), and Purdue by a score of 5–1, 1-0 (forfeit score), and 1-0 respectively.

In the knockout round, Arizona would defeat 1996 championship runners-up, Purdue, 2-1 then would beat 2000 open division champions Virginia 2–1 in the semifinals. Meanwhile, Delaware would defeat Texas Tech in penalties following a 0–0 draw in regulation and overtime, then would beat reigning open champions Colorado "Black" 2–0 in the semifinals. In the finals, the game would end in a 1–1 draw after regulation, making it the second straight year overtime would be required in the finals. In overtime, Delaware would score the game winning, golden-goal to win their first open championship. Co-captain, Sarah White, of Delaware would be named the division's MVP.

== Format ==
The competition consisted of 64 teams partitioned into 32 teams per gender. Each of these partitions were further divided into two 16-team divisions: an invite-only championship division and an open division. These divisions divided teams into four groups of four and first engaged in a round-robin tournament. In these groups, teams played each of the other three teams in their group once with the two best teams at the end of play advancing to an 8-team, single-elimination, knockout stage. The first metric for determining the best team was points, calculated first by giving a team 6 points for a win, 3 points for a tie, and 0 points for a loss. Then, a team could be awarded an addition point for a shutout and an additional point for every goal scored, up to a max of 3 goals per game. If teams were tied on points, the following criteria were used in order:

1. Winner of head-to-head competition
2. Greatest goal difference
3. Most goals scored
4. Coin toss

Knockout stage games needed to declare a winner. If a knockout-stage game was tied at the end of regulation, overtime would begin. Overtime in the quarterfinals consisted of two, 5-minute, golden-goal periods while in the semifinals and finals, overtime consisted of two, 10-minute, golden-goal periods. If still tied after overtime, kicks from the mark would determine the winner. Pool play and quarterfinal games were two 40-minute halves, separated by a seven-minute halftime with the semifinals and finals also being 40-minute halves, but having a ten-minute halftime. If a player received three yellow cards during the course of the tournament they would be suspended the following the game.

== Qualification and selections ==
Each of the six regions received two automatic bids for each the men's and women's championship divisions that they awarded to its members. The reigning champions, BYU in the men's division and Penn State in the women's division, received an automatic bid with the final 5 bids for each division considered "at-large", and given out by NIRSA to teams, typically based on their regional tournament results and RPI.

The remaining teams participated in the open division, chosen on a first-come first-serve basis via online registration beginning on September 3, 2002.

=== Men's championship ===
Participating teams
Region	Team	Appearance	Last Bid
I	Cornell	3rd	2001
I	Delaware	1st	Never
II	Vanderbilt	1st	Never
II	Virginia	1st	Never
III	Illinois	4th	2001
III	Michigan	3rd	2001
III	Indiana	2nd	1995
IV	Texas	7th	2001
IV	Kansas	3rd	2000
IV	Rice	1st	Never
V	Colorado State	6th	2001
V	Minnesota	2nd	2001
VI	BYU	7th	2001
VI	Weber State	4th	2001
VI	Arizona	3rd	2000
VI	San Diego State	1st	Never

=== Women's championship ===
Participating teams
Region	Team	Appearance	Last Bid
I	Penn State	8th	2001
I	Maryland	2nd	1997
I	Princeton	1st	Never
II	JMU	6th	2001
II	Virginia Tech	5th	2001
II	Florida	3rd	2000
III	Miami (OH)	9th	2001
III	Ohio State	7th	2000
III	Michigan	4th	2001
III	Michigan State	2nd	2001
IV	Texas A&M	5th	2001
IV	Texas	5th	1998
V	Colorado	8th	2001
V	Colorado State	6th	2001
VI	San Diego State	4th	2001
VI	UC-Santa Barbara	3rd	2001

=== Men's open ===
Participating teams
Region	Num	Team
I	1	Penn State
II	2	Florida, JMU
III	2	Grand Valley State, Southern Illinois
IV	1	Texas A&M
V	3	Colorado, Iowa State, Wichita State
VI	7	Arizona State, UC-Santa Barbara, UC-San Diego, Central Washington, Oregon, Utah Valley State, Weber State "B"

=== Women's open ===
Participating teams
Region	Num	Team
I	2	Cornell, Delaware
II	1	Virginia
III	2	Illinois, Purdue
IV	3	Kansas, LSU, Texas Tech
V	3	Colorado Mines, Colorado State "Green", Colorado "Black"
VI	5	Arizona, UC-Berkeley, UC-Davis, Long Beach State, UCLA

== Group stage ==
=== Men's championship ===
Group A
Pos	Team	Pld	W	D	L	GF	GA	GD	SO (Note: Shutouts)	GFP (Note: Goals for, points. The points gained by scoring with a max of 3 per game)	Pts	Qualification
1	Cornell	3	2	1	0	5	2	+3	1	5	21	Advanced to knockout stage
2	Vanderbilt	3	1	1	1	4	2	+2	1	4	14	Advanced to knockout stage
3	Minnesota	3	1	1	1	2	3	−1	1	2	12	
4	San Diego State	3	0	1	2	2	6	−4	0	2	5	

Scores

10:00am PST	Cornell	1–1	Vanderbilt	Field 1
Thu, November 21		Report		Stadium: Kern County Soccer Complex; Bakersfield, CA

10:00am PST	San Diego State	1–1	Minnesota	Field 2
Thu, November 21		Report		Stadium: Kern County Soccer Complex; Bakersfield, CA

3:00pm PST	Minnesota	0–2	Cornell	Field 1
Thu, November 21		Report		Stadium: Kern County Soccer Complex; Bakersfield, CA

3:00pm PST	Vanderbilt	3–0	San Diego State	Field 2
Thu, November 21		Report		Stadium: Kern County Soccer Complex; Bakersfield, CA

10:00am PST	Cornell	2–1	San Diego State	Field 1
Fri, November 22		Report		Stadium: Kern County Soccer Complex; Bakersfield, CA

10:00am PST	Minnesota	1–0	Vanderbilt	Field 2
Fri, November 22		Report		Stadium: Kern County Soccer Complex; Bakersfield, CA

Group B
Pos	Team	Pld	W	D	L	GF	GA	GD	SO	GFP	Pts	Qualification
1	BYU	3	3	0	0	9	2	+7	1	7	26	Advanced to knockout stage
2	Delaware	3	1	0	2	3	7	−4	1	3	10	Advanced to knockout stage
3	Rice	3	1	0	2	2	3	−1	1	2	9	
4	Indiana	3	1	0	2	2	4	−2	0	2	8	

Scores

10:00am PST	Delaware	1–0	Rice	Field 3
Thu, November 21		Report		Stadium: Kern County Soccer Complex; Bakersfield, CA

10:00am PST	Indiana	0–2	BYU	Field 14
Thu, November 21		Report		Stadium: Kern County Soccer Complex; Bakersfield, CA

3:00pm PST	BYU	5–1	Delaware	Field 3
Thu, November 21		Report		Stadium: Kern County Soccer Complex; Bakersfield, CA

3:00pm PST	Rice	1–0	Indiana	Field 14
Thu, November 21		Report		Stadium: Kern County Soccer Complex; Bakersfield, CA

10:00am PST	Delaware	1–2	Indiana	Field 3
Fri, November 22		Report		Stadium: Kern County Soccer Complex; Bakersfield, CA

10:00am PST	BYU	2–1	Rice	Field 14
Fri, November 22		Report		Stadium: Kern County Soccer Complex; Bakersfield, CA

Group C
Pos	Team	Pld	W	D	L	GF	GA	GD	SO	GFP	Pts	Qualification
1	Michigan	3	2	1	0	4	1	+3	2	4	21	Advanced to knockout stage
2	Weber State	3	2	0	1	5	4	+1	0	5	17	Advanced to knockout stage
3	Kansas	3	0	2	1	3	4	−1	0	3	9	
4	Virginia	3	0	1	2	2	5	−3	0	2	5	

Scores

10:00am PST	Michigan	1–1	Kansas	Field 15
Thu, November 21		Report		Stadium: Kern County Soccer Complex; Bakersfield, CA

10:00am PST	Virginia	1–3	Weber State	Field 16
Thu, November 21		Report		Stadium: Kern County Soccer Complex; Bakersfield, CA

3:00pm PST	Weber State	0–2	Michigan	Field 15
Thu, November 21		Report		Stadium: Kern County Soccer Complex; Bakersfield, CA

3:00pm PST	Kansas	1–1	Virginia	Field 16
Thu, November 21		Report		Stadium: Kern County Soccer Complex; Bakersfield, CA

10:00am PST	Michigan	1–0	Virginia	Field 15
Fri, November 22		Report		Stadium: Kern County Soccer Complex; Bakersfield, CA

10:00am PST	Weber State	2–1	Kansas	Field 16
Fri, November 22		Report		Stadium: Kern County Soccer Complex; Bakersfield, CA

Group D
Pos	Team	Pld	W	D	L	GF	GA	GD	SO	GFP	Pts	Qualification
1	Arizona	3	1	2	0	4	3	+1	1	4	17	Advanced to knockout stage
2	Illinois	3	1	2	0	3	2	+1	2	3	17	Advanced to knockout stage
3	Colorado State	3	0	3	0	2	2	0	2	2	13	
4	Texas	3	0	1	2	3	5	−2	0	3	6	

Scores

10:00am PST	Colorado State	0–0	Illinois	Field 17
Thu, November 21		Report		Stadium: Kern County Soccer Complex; Bakersfield, CA

10:00am PST	Texas	1–2	Arizona	Field BC1
Thu, November 21		Report		Stadium: Kern County Soccer Complex; Bakersfield, CA

3:00pm PST	Arizona	0–0	Colorado State	Field 17
Thu, November 21		Report		Stadium: Kern County Soccer Complex; Bakersfield, CA

3:00pm PST	Illinois	1–0	Texas	Field BC1
Thu, November 21		Report		Stadium: Kern County Soccer Complex; Bakersfield, CA

10:00am PST	Colorado State	2–2	Texas	Field 17
Fri, November 22		Report		Stadium: Kern County Soccer Complex; Bakersfield, CA

10:00am PST	Arizona	2–2	Illinois	Field BC1
Fri, November 22		Report		Stadium: Kern County Soccer Complex; Bakersfield, CA

=== Women's championship ===
Group A
Pos	Team	Pld	W	D	L	GF	GA	GD	SO	GFP	Pts	Qualification
1	JMU	3	2	1	0	8	4	+4	0	7	22	Advanced to knockout stage
2	Florida	3	1	0	2	6	6	0	1	6	13	Advanced to knockout stage
3	Michigan State	3	1	1	1	3	3	0	0	3	12	
4	Princeton	3	1	0	2	2	6	−4	1	2	9	

Scores

10:00am PST	Princeton	0–3	Florida	Field 5
Thu, November 21		Report		Stadium: Kern County Soccer Complex; Bakersfield, CA

10:00am PST	JMU	1–1	Michigan State	Field 6
Thu, November 21		Report		Stadium: Kern County Soccer Complex; Bakersfield, CA

3:00pm PST	Michigan State	0–1	Princeton	Field 5
Thu, November 21		Report		Stadium: Kern County Soccer Complex; Bakersfield, CA

3:00pm PST	Florida	2–4	JMU	Field 6
Thu, November 21		Report		Stadium: Kern County Soccer Complex; Bakersfield, CA

10:00am PST	Princeton	1–3	JMU	Field 9
Fri, November 22		Report		Stadium: Kern County Soccer Complex; Bakersfield, CA

10:00am PST	Michigan State	2–1	Florida	Field 10
Fri, November 22		Report		Stadium: Kern County Soccer Complex; Bakersfield, CA

Group B
Pos	Team	Pld	W	D	L	GF	GA	GD	SO	GFP	Pts	Qualification
1	Colorado	3	2	1	0	9	3	+6	1	8	24	Advanced to knockout stage
2	Michigan	3	2	1	0	9	3	+6	1	8	24	Advanced to knockout stage
3	Texas A&M	3	1	0	2	3	8	−5	1	3	10	
4	Maryland	3	0	0	3	0	7	−7	0	0	0	

Scores

8:00am PST	Maryland	0–3	Colorado	Field 7
Thu, November 21		Report		Stadium: Kern County Soccer Complex; Bakersfield, CA

8:00am PST	Texas A&M	1–4	Michigan	Field 8
Thu, November 21		Report		Stadium: Kern County Soccer Complex; Bakersfield, CA

1:00pm PST	Michigan	3–0	Maryland	Field 7
Thu, November 21		Report		Stadium: Kern County Soccer Complex; Bakersfield, CA

1:00pm PST	Colorado	4–1	Texas A&M	Field 8
Thu, November 21		Report		Stadium: Kern County Soccer Complex; Bakersfield, CA

10:00am PST	Maryland	0–1	Texas A&M	Field 12
Fri, November 22		Report		Stadium: Kern County Soccer Complex; Bakersfield, CA

10:00am PST	Michigan	2–2	Colorado	Field 13
Fri, November 22		Report		Stadium: Kern County Soccer Complex; Bakersfield, CA

Group C
Pos	Team	Pld	W	D	L	GF	GA	GD	SO	GFP	Pts	Qualification
1	Miami (OH)	3	2	1	0	5	2	+3	1	5	21	Advanced to knockout stage
2	San Diego State	3	1	1	1	5	5	0	0	5	14	Advanced to knockout stage
3	Penn State	3	0	3	0	2	2	0	2	2	13	
4	Texas	3	0	1	2	2	5	−3	1	2	6	

Scores

8:00am PST	San Diego State	2–1	Texas	Field 5
Thu, November 21		Report		Stadium: Kern County Soccer Complex; Bakersfield, CA

8:00am PST	Penn State	0–0	Miami (OH)	Field 6
Thu, November 21		Report		Stadium: Kern County Soccer Complex; Bakersfield, CA

1:00pm PST	Miami (OH)	2–1	San Diego State	Field 5
Thu, November 21		Report		Stadium: Kern County Soccer Complex; Bakersfield, CA

1:00pm PST	Texas	0–0	Penn State	Field 6
Thu, November 21		Report		Stadium: Kern County Soccer Complex; Bakersfield, CA

10:00am PST	San Diego State	2–2	Penn State	Field 5
Fri, November 22		Report		Stadium: Kern County Soccer Complex; Bakersfield, CA

10:00am PST	Miami (OH)	3–1	Texas	Field 6
Fri, November 22		Report		Stadium: Kern County Soccer Complex; Bakersfield, CA

Group D
Pos	Team	Pld	W	D	L	GF	GA	GD	SO	GFP	Pts	Qualification
1	UC-Santa Barbara	3	2	1	0	6	2	+4	2	6	23	Advanced to knockout stage
2	Virginia Tech	3	2	1	0	3	1	+2	2	3	20	Advanced to knockout stage
3	Ohio State	3	1	0	2	3	5	−2	1	3	10	
4	Colorado State	3	0	0	3	2	6	−4	0	2	2	

Scores

10:00am PST	Colorado State	2–3	UC-Santa Barbara	Field 7
Thu, November 21		Report		Stadium: Kern County Soccer Complex; Bakersfield, CA

10:00am PST	Virginia Tech	2–1	Ohio State	Field 8
Thu, November 21		Report		Stadium: Kern County Soccer Complex; Bakersfield, CA

3:00pm PST	Ohio State	2–0	Colorado State	Field 7
Thu, November 21		Report		Stadium: Kern County Soccer Complex; Bakersfield, CA

3:00pm PST	UC-Santa Barbara	0–0	Virginia Tech	Field 8
Thu, November 21		Report		Stadium: Kern County Soccer Complex; Bakersfield, CA

10:00am PST	Colorado State	0–1	Virginia Tech	Field 7
Fri, November 22		Report		Stadium: Kern County Soccer Complex; Bakersfield, CA

10:00am PST	Ohio State	0–3	UC-Santa Barbara	Field 8
Fri, November 22		Report		Stadium: Kern County Soccer Complex; Bakersfield, CA

=== Men's open ===
Group E
Pos	Team	Pld	W	D	L	GF	GA	GD	SO	GFP	Pts	Qualification
1	Utah Valley State	3	2	0	1	6	5	+1	0	6	18	Advanced to knockout stage
2	JMU	3	2	0	1	4	2	+2	1	4	17	Advanced to knockout stage
3	UC-San Diego	3	1	1	1	6	6	0	1	6	16	
4	Southern Illinois	3	0	1	2	4	7	+3	0	4	7	

Scores

8:00am PST	SIU	0–2	JMU	Field 1
Thu, November 21		Report		Stadium: Kern County Soccer Complex; Bakersfield, CA

8:00am PST	UC San Diego	2–3	Utah Valley	Field 2
Thu, November 21		Report		Stadium: Kern County Soccer Complex; Bakersfield, CA

1:00pm PST	Utah Valley	2–1	SIU	Field 1
Thu, November 21		Report		Stadium: Kern County Soccer Complex; Bakersfield, CA

1:00pm PST	JMU	0–1	UC San Diego	Field 2
Thu, November 21		Report		Stadium: Kern County Soccer Complex; Bakersfield, CA

8:00am PST	SIU	3–3	UC San Diego	Field 1
Fri, November 22		Report		Stadium: Kern County Soccer Complex; Bakersfield, CA

8:00am PST	Utah Valley	1–2	JMU	Field 2
Fri, November 22		Report		Stadium: Kern County Soccer Complex; Bakersfield, CA

Group F
Pos	Team	Pld	W	D	L	GF	GA	GD	SO	GFP	Pts	Qualification
1	Arizona State	3	2	1	0	10	2	+8	1	6	22	Advanced to knockout stage
2	Weber State "B"	3	2	0	1	8	4	+4	2	7	21	Advanced to knockout stage
3	Iowa State	3	0	2	1	1	4	−3	1	1	8	
4	Florida	3	0	1	2	2	11	−9	0	2	5	

Scores

8:00am PST	Iowa State	1–1	Florida	Field 3
Thu, November 21		Report		Stadium: Kern County Soccer Complex; Bakersfield, CA

8:00am PST	Arizona State	4–1	Weber State	Field 14
Thu, November 21		Report		Stadium: Kern County Soccer Complex; Bakersfield, CA

1:00pm PST	Weber State	3–0	Iowa State	Field 3
Thu, November 21		Report		Stadium: Kern County Soccer Complex; Bakersfield, CA

1:00pm PST	Florida	1–6	Arizona State	Field 14
Thu, November 21		Report		Stadium: Kern County Soccer Complex; Bakersfield, CA

8:00am PST	Iowa State	0–0	Arizona State	Field 3
Fri, November 22		Report		Stadium: Kern County Soccer Complex; Bakersfield, CA

8:00am PST	Weber State	4–0	Florida	Field 14
Fri, November 22		Report		Stadium: Kern County Soccer Complex; Bakersfield, CA

Group G
Pos	Team	Pld	W	D	L	GF	GA	GD	SO	GFP	Pts	Qualification
1	Texas A&M	3	3	0	0	5	1	+4	2	5	25	Advanced to knockout stage
2	UC-Santa Barbara	3	2	0	1	4	1	+3	2	4	18	Advanced to knockout stage
3	Grand Valley State	3	1	0	2	3	5	−2	0	3	9	
4	Oregon	3	0	0	3	1	6	−5	0	1	1	

Scores

8:00am PST	Grand Valley	0–1	UC-Santa Barbara	Field 15
Thu, November 21		Report		Stadium: Kern County Soccer Complex; Bakersfield, CA

8:00am PST	Oregon	0–1	Texas A&M	Field 16
Thu, November 21		Report		Stadium: Kern County Soccer Complex; Bakersfield, CA

1:00pm PST	Texas A&M	3–1	Grand Valley	Field 15
Thu, November 21		Report		Stadium: Kern County Soccer Complex; Bakersfield, CA

1:00pm PST	UC-Santa Barbara	3–0	Oregon	Field 16
Thu, November 21		Report		Stadium: Kern County Soccer Complex; Bakersfield, CA

8:00am PST	Grand Valley	2–1	Oregon	Field 15
Fri, November 22		Report		Stadium: Kern County Soccer Complex; Bakersfield, CA

8:00am PST	Texas A&M	1–0	UC-Santa Barbara	Field 16
Fri, November 22		Report		Stadium: Kern County Soccer Complex; Bakersfield, CA

Group H
Pos	Team	Pld	W	D	L	GF	GA	GD	SO	GFP	Pts	Qualification
1	Penn State	3	3	0	0	9	2	+7	1	7	26	Advanced to knockout stage
2	Colorado	3	2	0	1	6	3	+3	1	6	19	Advanced to knockout stage
3	Central Washington	3	0	1	2	2	5	−3	0	2	5	
4	Wichita State	3	0	1	2	2	9	−7	0	2	5	

Scores

8:00am PST	Central Washington	1–1	Wichita State	Field 17
Thu, November 21		Report		Stadium: Kern County Soccer Complex; Bakersfield, CA

8:00am PST	Colorado	1–2	Penn State	Field BC1
Thu, November 21		Report		Stadium: Kern County Soccer Complex; Bakersfield, CA

1:00pm PST	Penn State	2–0	Central Washington	Field 17
Thu, November 21		Report		Stadium: Kern County Soccer Complex; Bakersfield, CA

1:00pm PST	Wichita State	0–3	Colorado	Field BC1
Thu, November 21		Report		Stadium: Kern County Soccer Complex; Bakersfield, CA

8:00am PST	Central Washington	1–2	Colorado	Field 17
Fri, November 22		Report		Stadium: Kern County Soccer Complex; Bakersfield, CA

8:00am PST	Penn State	5–1	Wichita State	Field BC1
Fri, November 22		Report		Stadium: Kern County Soccer Complex; Bakersfield, CA

=== Women's open ===
Group E
Pos	Team	Pld	W	D	L	GF	GA	GD	SO	GFP	Pts	Qualification
1	Arizona	3	3	0	0	9	1	+8	2	8	28	Advanced to knockout stage
2	Colorado "Black"	3	2	0	1	3	2	+1	2	3	17	Advanced to knockout stage
3	Cornell	3	0	1	2	1	5	−4	0	1	4	
4	UC-Davis	3	0	1	2	1	6	−5	0	1	4	

Scores

10:00am PST	Cornell	0–1	Colorado	Field 12
Thu, November 21		Report		Stadium: Kern County Soccer Complex; Bakersfield, CA

10:00am PST	UC-Davis	0–4	Arizona	Field 13
Thu, November 21		Report		Stadium: Kern County Soccer Complex; Bakersfield, CA

3:00pm PST	Arizona	3–0	Cornell	Field 12
Thu, November 21		Report		Stadium: Kern County Soccer Complex; Bakersfield, CA

3:00pm PST	Colorado	1–0	UC-Davis	Field 13
Thu, November 21		Report		Stadium: Kern County Soccer Complex; Bakersfield, CA

8:00am PST	Cornell	1–1	UC-Davis	Field 9
Fri, November 22		Report		Stadium: Kern County Soccer Complex; Bakersfield, CA

8:00am PST	Arizona	2–1	Colorado	Field 10
Fri, November 22		Report		Stadium: Kern County Soccer Complex; Bakersfield, CA

Group F
Pos	Team	Pld	W	D	L	GF	GA	GD	SO	GFP	Pts	Qualification
1	Delaware	2	3	0	0	7	1	+6	2	5	25	Advanced to knockout stage
2	Purdue	2	2	0	1	5	1	+4	2	4	18	Advanced to knockout stage
3	Colorado Mines	2	1	0	2	2	9	−7	1	2	9	
4	Long Beach State	Did not attend (Note: All three scheduled games were recorded as a 1–0 loss, giving each team +8 points (6 for a win, 1 for a shutout, and 1 for the goal))										

Scores

10:00am PST	Colorado Mines	1–5	Delaware	Field 9
Thu, November 21		Report		Stadium: Kern County Soccer Complex; Bakersfield, CA

10:00am PST	Long Beach	0–1; Forfeit	Purdue	Field 10
Thu, November 21		Report		Stadium: Kern County Soccer Complex; Bakersfield, CA

3:00pm PST	Purdue	4–0	Colorado Mines	Field 9
Thu, November 21		Report		Stadium: Kern County Soccer Complex; Bakersfield, CA

3:00pm PST	Delaware	1–0; Forfeit	Long Beach	Field 10
Thu, November 21		Report		Stadium: Kern County Soccer Complex; Bakersfield, CA

8:00am PST	Colorado Mines	1–0; Forfeit	Long Beach	Field 12
Fri, November 22		Report		Stadium: Kern County Soccer Complex; Bakersfield, CA

8:00am PST	Purdue	0–1	Delaware	Field 13
Fri, November 22		Report		Stadium: Kern County Soccer Complex; Bakersfield, CA

Group G
Pos	Team	Pld	W	D	L	GF	GA	GD	SO	GFP	Pts	Qualification
1	UC-Berkeley	3	2	1	0	6	2	+4	2	6	23	Advanced to knockout stage
2	Illinois	3	1	1	1	5	5	0	0	5	14	Advanced to knockout stage
3	Kansas	3	1	0	2	5	4	+1	0	4	10	
4	Colorado State "Green"	3	1	0	2	3	8	−5	0	3	9	

Scores

8:00am PST	Kansas	4–1	Colorado State	Field 9
Thu, November 21		Report		Stadium: Kern County Soccer Complex; Bakersfield, CA

8:00am PST	UC-Berkeley	2–2	Illinois	Field 10
Thu, November 21		Report		Stadium: Kern County Soccer Complex; Bakersfield, CA

1:00pm PST	Illinois	2–1	Kansas	Field 9
Thu, November 21		Report		Stadium: Kern County Soccer Complex; Bakersfield, CA

1:00pm PST	Colorado State	0–3	UC-Berkeley	Field 10
Thu, November 21		Report		Stadium: Kern County Soccer Complex; Bakersfield, CA

8:00am PST	Kansas	0–1	UC-Berkeley	Field 5
Fri, November 22		Report		Stadium: Kern County Soccer Complex; Bakersfield, CA

8:00am PST	Illinois	1–2	Colorado State	Field 6
Fri, November 22		Report		Stadium: Kern County Soccer Complex; Bakersfield, CA

Group H
Pos	Team	Pld	W	D	L	GF	GA	GD	SO	GFP	Pts	Qualification
1	Virginia	3	3	0	0	9	1	+8	2	7	27	Advanced to knockout stage
2	Texas Tech	3	1	1	1	3	5	−2	0	3	12	Advanced to knockout stage
3	UCLA	3	1	0	2	2	3	−1	1	2	9	
4	LSU	3	0	1	2	2	7	−5	0	2	5	

Scores

8:00am PST	Texas Tech	1–1	LSU	Field 12
Thu, November 21		Report		Stadium: Kern County Soccer Complex; Bakersfield, CA

8:00am PST	UCLA	0–1	Virginia	Field 13
Thu, November 21		Report		Stadium: Kern County Soccer Complex; Bakersfield, CA

1:00pm PST	Virginia	3–0	Texas Tech	Field 12
Thu, November 21		Report		Stadium: Kern County Soccer Complex; Bakersfield, CA

1:00pm PST	LSU	0–1	UCLA	Field 13
Thu, November 21		Report		Stadium: Kern County Soccer Complex; Bakersfield, CA

8:00am PST	Texas Tech	2–1	UCLA	Field 7
Fri, November 22		Report		Stadium: Kern County Soccer Complex; Bakersfield, CA

8:00am PST	Virginia	5–1	LSU	Field 8
Fri, November 22		Report		Stadium: Kern County Soccer Complex; Bakersfield, CA

== Tournament bracket ==
=== Men's championship ===
Quarterfinals
Fri • 3:00pm • Field 2
Cornell	1
Delaware	2
Fri • 3:00pm • Field 3
Arizona	1
Weber State	3
Fri • 3:00pm • Field 16
BYU	6
Illinois	2
Fri • 3:00pm • Field 17
Michigan	2
Vanderbilt	1

Semifinals
Sat • 10:00am • Field 12
Delaware	1
Weber State	3
Sat • 10:00am • Field 13
BYU	3
Michigan	0

Final
Sat • 5:30pm • Field 7
Weber State	2
BYU	0

=== Women's championship ===
Quarterfinals
Fri • 5:00pm • Field 6
JMU	0
Michigan	1
Fri • 5:00pm • Field 7
UC-Santa Barbara	1
San Diego State (pen.)	2
Fri • 5:00pm • Field 8
Colorado	3
Virginia Tech	1
Fri • 5:00pm • Field 9
Miami (OH)	2
Florida	1

Semifinals
Sat • 10:00am • Field 14
Michigan	3
San Diego State	0
Sat • 10:00am • Field 15
Colorado	2
Miami (OH)	0

Final
Sat • 3:30pm • Field 6
Michigan	2
Colorado	1

=== Men's open ===
Quarterfinals
Fri • 1:00pm • Field 2
Utah Valley State	3
Weber State "B"	2
Fri • 1:00pm • Field 3
Penn State	1
UC-Santa Barbara	0
Fri • 1:00pm • Field 16
Arizona State	0
Colorado	2
Fri • 1:00pm • Field 17
Texas A&M	1
JMU	0

Semifinals
Sat • 8:00am • Field 12
Utah Valley State	0
Penn State	2
Sat • 8:00am • Field 13
Colorado	0
Texas A&M	3

Final
Sat • 1:00pm • Field 8
Penn State	0
Texas A&M	4

=== Women's open ===
Quarterfinals
Fri • 1:00pm • Field 6
Arizona	2
Purdue	1
Fri • 1:00pm • Field 7
Virginia	3
Illinois	1
Fri • 1:00pm • Field 8
Delaware (pen.)	1
Texas Tech	0
Fri • 1:00pm • Field 9
UC-Berkeley	0
Colorado "Black" (pen.)	1

Semifinals
Sat • 8:00am • Field 14
Arizona	2
Virginia	1
Sat • 8:00am • Field 15
Delaware	2
Colorado "Black"	0

Final
Sat • 1:00pm • Field 9
Arizona	1
Delaware (a.e.t.)	2

== All-tournament teams ==
=== Men's championship ===
Name	Team
Scott Badger (Note: Most Valuable Player)	Weber State
Curtis Whitesides	Weber State
Brent Moyes	Weber State
TJ Waters	Weber State
Eric Schueller	Michigan
Greg Gavlik	Michigan
Josh Hollens	Delaware
Roger Garrison	Delaware
Casey Waldron	BYU
Chad Oyler	BYU
Matt Affleck	BYU
Tom Thies	Illinois
Outstanding sportsmanship
Iowa State

=== Women's championship ===
Name	Team
Katie Keller	Michigan
Breanne Bennett	Michigan
Ryann MacDonald	Colorado
Ashley Felter	Miami (OH)
Alissa Shaw	Michigan
Lauren Richey	Colorado
Avy Austria	San Diego State
Anna Haghgooie	Michigan
Allison Marshall	Colorado
Rachel Lehman	Miami (OH)
Gwen Reyes	Michigan
Stacy Kuntz	Colorado
Outstanding sportsmanship
Princeton

=== Men's open ===
Name	Team
Joe Shine	Texas A&M
George Millas	Texas A&M
John Garvey	Texas A&M
Jake Eggett	Utah Valley State
Chad Meldrum	Penn State
Chris Camacho	Texas A&M
Pete Lindahl	Penn State
Mike Rogers	Utah Valley State
James Takow	Texas A&M
Steve Toniatti	Penn State
Brian Bishop	Colorado
Jake Servinsky	JMU

=== Women's open ===
Name	Team
Sara White	Delaware
Andrea Gastellum	Arizona
Kate Guider	Delaware
Kelly Melton	Virginia
Samantha Watson	Delaware
Beth Taylor	Arizona
Caroline Stone	Colorado "Black"
Sara Plummer	Virginia
Dana Berry	Delaware
Leslie Watson	Arizona
Courtney Shields	Delaware
Kamaya Damwijk	Arizona
