= 2003 NIRSA National Soccer Championship =

- League: NIRSA
- Sport: Soccer
- Site: University of Alabama; Tuscaloosa, Alabama
- Duration: November 20–22, 2003
- Number of teams: 24 (men's championship); 16 (women's championship); 16 (men's open); 16 (women's open)
- Results: Official Results

Men's Championship Division
- Score: 2–0
- Champion: Illinois (Vacated) (1st title, 2nd title game)
- Runners-up: Utah Valley State (1st title game)
- Season MVP: Tyson Masar (Note: Illinois relinquished all awards due to ineligible players.) (Illinois)

Women's Championship Division
- Score: 1–0
- Champion: Colorado (3rd title, 4th title game)
- Runners-up: Miami (OH) (4th title game)
- Season MVP: Kim Lipman (Colorado)

Men's Open Division
- Score: 1–0
- Champion: UC-Santa Barbara (1st title, 1st title game)
- Runners-up: JMU (3rd title game)
- Season MVP: Chris Hughes (UC-Santa Barbara)

Women's Open Division
- Score: 3–2 (pen.)
- Champion: Arizona (1st title, 1st title game)
- Runners-up: Kansas (2nd title game)
- Top seed: Kamaya Damwijk (Arizona)

NIRSA national soccer championships seasons
- ← 2002 2004 →

The 2003 NIRSA national soccer championship was the 10th NIRSA National Soccer Championships, the annual national championships for United States-based, collegiate club soccer teams organized by NIRSA. It took place at the University of Alabama in Tuscaloosa, Alabama from Thursday, November 20 to Saturday, November 22, 2003.

This tournament saw the first ever team to be disqualified after the tournament when it was discovered that tournament winners in the men's championship division, Illinois, used ineligible players. All awards, including all-tournament selections and the title, would be relinquished. Utah Valley State, despite self-proclaiming themselves as such, would not be named champions, officially leaving the tournament without a champion.

== Overview ==
=== Men's championship ===
The tournament wouldn't see its most successful club in 5-time champion, BYU, who were beginning their first season in the Premier Development League. In their absence, the finals would feature 2001 tournament finalists Illinois and finals debutants, Utah Valley State, in only their second tournament appearance. Prior to the finals, Illinois would win their 2 group stage games against Minnesota and Oklahoma State, respectively, both by a score of 3–1 and claim the top rank in their group on the goals for tiebreaker. Meanwhile, Utah Valley State would narrowly advance to knockout round on goal difference following a 2–1 win over Virginia and a 2–3 loss to Texas A&M.

In the knockout round, both teams would require extra time in their round of 16 matchups with Illinois scoring a golden goal in overtime following a 0–0 draw in regulation over Clemson and Utah Valley State winning in penalties over Mississippi State following a 1–1 draw in regulation and overtime. Following this, Illinois would win their quarterfinal match 4–2 over Texas A&M and their semifinal match 4–0 over Colorado State while Utah Valley State would win their quarterfinal match 4–1 over SCSL (now SCSA) tournament champions Auburn and their semifinal match 1–0 over Minnesota. In the finals, Illinois would defeat Utah Valley State 2–0 and senior, Tyson Masar would be named tournament MVP.

It would later be announced that Illinois used ineligible players during the tournament and would be relinquished of all awards including their 6 wins, 4 all tournament team selections, and the title. Illinois had 3 ex-NCAA players that played in the tournament, but also had a 3rd string backup goalie that had played at the NJCAA level. While the backup goalie never entered the field, his presence on the official roster brought Illinois over the maximum allowable ex-NCAA player limit of 3. While Utah Valley State would self-proclaim themselves champions, NIRSA would declare them "finalists" and leave the tournament without a champion. To date, this is the only time a team has been disqualified in any of the four divisions for any reason.

=== Women's championship ===
In the women's championship division finals, 2 two-time champions would face off in reigning finalists Colorado and inaugural champions Miami (OH) in a rematch of the 1995 national championship where Colorado was victorious. Coming into the finals, both teams would win all three of their group stage games without conceding a goal. Miami (OH) won all three games 1–0 against San Diego State, JMU, and Texas A&M, respectively, and Colorado won 5–0, 1–0, and 2–0 against Ohio State, 2001 champions and regional champions Penn State, and previously undefeated Baylor, respectively.

In the quarterfinals, both teams would win 2–1 with Miami (OH) beating Purdue and Colorado beating San Diego State. In the semifinals, Miami (OH) would defeat UC-Santa Barbara 1–0 while Colorado would require penalties against rival Colorado State following a 0–0 draw in regulation and overtime to advance to their second straight finals. Colorado would go on to win 1–0 and become the first women's championship team to win 3 national titles. Colorado's Kim Lipman would be named tournament MVP and best goalkeeper.

=== Men's open ===
In finals, finals debutants UC-Santa Barbara would face two-time open champions JMU. In the group stage, both teams would be undefeated with UC-Santa Barbara winning their opener 2–1 against Iowa State followed by a 10–0 win over Southern Miss and a 7–0 win over Ohio University while JMU would win their opener 2–1 over North Dakota State followed by a 1–0 win over Florida State and a 1–1 draw against Cornell. In the quarterfinals, UC-Santa Barbara would beat Florida State 3–0 while JMU would require penalties to beat Alabama following a 0–0 draw in regulation and overtime. In the semifinals, UC-Santa Barbara would beat 2000 championship division winners and reigning open finalists Penn State in penalties following a scoreless game to reach their first finals while JMU would defeat Vanderbilt 2–1. In the finals, UC-Santa Barbara would score the lone goal of the match and claim their first title. UC-Santa Barbara's Chris Hughes would be named the division's MVP.

=== Women's open ===
In the women's open division finals, reigning open tournament finalists, Arizona, would face finals debutants Kansas in a rematch of their group stage finale. Coming into the finals, Arizona would beat Alabama 4–0 in their opener while Kansas beat Vermont 2–0 in theirs. Following this, Arizona would defeat Vermont 3–0 while Kansas would beat Alabama 8–0, ensuring both teams would advance to the knockout stage with the finale determining seeding. In the group stage finale, the teams would draw 1–1, giving Kansas the top seed in the group with a superior goal difference.

In the quarterfinals, Kansas would defeat Ohio University 3–2 while Arizona would require penalties to defeat UC-Berkeley following a scoreless match in regulation and overtime. In the semifinals, Kansas would defeat UCLA 1–0 while Arizona beat 2001 open champions Colorado "Black" 3–1. In the finals, the game would once again end tied, this time 2–2 following regulation and overtime. However, this game required a winner, so the game would go to penalties to determine a champion, which Arizona would win claiming their first open title. Junior Kamaya Damwijk of Arizona would go on to be named the division's MVP. Following this tournament, Damwijk would walk-on to Arizona's women's varsity team where she would score 6 goals in 20 games, 10 of which being starts, in route to the team's first Pac-12 championship and their first NCAA Tournament appearance.

== Format ==
The competition consisted of 72 teams: 40 men's teams and 32 women's teams. Each of these divisions were further divided into a 24-team divisions for the men's championship and a 16-team division for the women's championship, men's open, and women's open. The men's championship division divided teams into four "master" groups of six while the remaining divisions divided teams into six groups of four. The men's championship further divided "master" groups into two "sub groups" of three. Each division engaged in a round-robin tournament that determined teams able to advance to a knockout stage. The men's championship division had teams play two pool play games within their "master" group.

The remaining divisions played each of the other three teams in their group. In the men's championship division, the four highest ranked teams from each group advanced to their knockout stage, with the 5th and 6th placed team advancing to a consolation bracket. In the remaining divisions, the top team from each group as well as the two best second placed teams advanced to their knockout stage. Pool play games were two 40-minute halves, separated by a seven-minute halftime and utilized the three points for a win system.

Tie-breaking criteria for group play
The ranking of teams in each group was based on the following criteria in order:
1. Highest number of points
2. Winner of head-to-head competition
3. Greatest goal difference
4. Most goals scored
5. Most shutouts

In a tie breaking scenario involving more than 2 teams, the tiebreaker procedure would begin. If one team is identified as different and both remaining teams are still tied, the tie breaker procedure is restarted.

If a tie still remained after the first 5 criteria, the following was used to break a tie:

1. NCAA kicks from the mark
  - If there was a three-way tie, a coin-flip would be conducted. The two teams that chose the same outcome would compete in kicks from the mark between each other. The winner would compete with the last remaining team in kicks from the mark
  - If there's a four-way tie, a drawing of lots would be conducted

Knockout stage games also consisted of two 40-minute halves. The round of 16 and quarterfinals were separated by a seven-minute halftime while the semifinals and finals had a ten-minute halftime. Knockout stage games needed to declare a winner. If a knockout-stage game was tied at the end of regulation, overtime would begin. Overtime in the round of 16 and quarterfinals consisted of two, 5-minute, golden-goal periods while overtime in the semifinals and finals consisted of two, 10-minute, golden-goal periods. If still tied after overtime, kicks from the mark would determine the winner.

== Qualification and selections ==
Each of the six regions received three automatic bids for the men's championship division and two automatic bids for the women's championship that they awarded to its members. The final bids for each division were considered "at-large", and were given out by NIRSA to teams, typically based on their regional tournament results and RPI.

The remaining teams participated in the open division, chosen on a first-come first-serve basis via online registration beginning on September 2, 2003.

=== Men's championship ===
Participating teams
Region	Team	Appearance	Last Bid
I	Cornell	4th	2002
I	Navy	4th	2001
I	Delaware	2nd	2002
II	Clemson	4th	2001
II	Mississippi State	3rd	2001
II	Virginia	2nd	2002
II	Auburn	1st	Never
III	Purdue	6th	1998
III	Illinois	5th	2002
III	Michigan	4th	2002
III	Michigan State	1st	Never
IV	Texas	9th	2002
IV	Kansas	4th	2002
IV	Texas A&M	4th	2001
IV	Oklahoma State	1st	Never
V	Colorado State	9th	2002
V	Colorado	5th	2000
V	Minnesota	3rd	2002
VI	Weber State	5th	2002
VI	Arizona	4th	2002
VI	San Diego State	2nd	2002
VI	Utah Valley State	2nd	1998
VI	Arizona State	1st	Never
VI	UC Berkeley	1st	Never

=== Women's championship ===
Participating teams
Region	Team	Appearance	Last Bid
I	Penn State	10th	2002
I	Maryland	3rd	2002
II	JMU	7th	2002
II	Florida	4th	2002
II	Virginia	1st	Never
III	Miami (OH)	10th	2002
III	Ohio State	8th	2002
III	Purdue	6th	1999
III	Michigan	5th	2002
IV	Texas A&M	6th	2002
IV	Texas	6th	2002
IV	Baylor	4th	2001
V	Colorado	10th	2002
V	Colorado State	7th	2002
VI	San Diego State	5th	2002
VI	UC-Santa Barbara	4th	2002

=== Men's open ===
Participating teams
Region	Num	Team
I	2	Cornell, Penn State
II	5	Alabama, Florida State, JMU, Southern Mississippi, Vanderbilt
III	3	Grand Valley State, Ohio, Wisconsin
IV	1	Texas "B"
V	2	Iowa State, North Dakota State
VI	3	UC-Santa Barbara, Central Washington, Oregon

=== Women's open ===
Participating teams
Region	Num	Team
I	2	Cornell, Vermont
II	3	Alabama, Georgia College, Georgia Tech
III	3	Illinois, Michigan State, Ohio
IV	2	Kansas, LSU
V	3	Colorado "Black", Colorado State "Green", Iowa State
VI	3	Arizona, UC-Berkeley, UCLA

== Group stage ==
=== Men's championship ===
Group A
Pool 1
Pos	Team	Pld	W	D	L	GF	GA	GD	Pts	Qualification
1	Colorado State	2	2	0	0	3	0	+3	6	Advanced to knockout stage
2	Clemson	2	1	0	1	2	2	0	3	Advanced to knockout stage
3	San Diego State	2	1	0	1	2	2	0	3	Consolation
Pool 2
Pos	Team	Pld	W	D	L	GF	GA	GD	Pts	Qualification
1	Texas	2	1	0	1	5	2	+3	3	Advanced to knockout stage
2	Michigan	2	1	0	1	2	1	+1	3	Advanced to knockout stage
3	Delaware	2	0	0	2	0	7	−7	0	Consolation

SCORES

Subgroup 1

8:00am CST	Colorado State	1–0	Clemson	Field 11
Thu, November 20		Report		Stadium: University of Alabama; Tuscaloosa, Alabama

2:00pm CST	Clemson	2–1	San Diego State	Field 11
Thu, November 20		Report		Stadium: University of Alabama; Tuscaloosa, Alabama

Subgroup 2

8:00am CST	Texas	5–0	Delaware	Field 10
Thu, November 20		Report		Stadium: University of Alabama; Tuscaloosa, Alabama

2:00pm CST	Michigan	2–0	Texas	Field 12
Thu, November 20		Report		Stadium: University of Alabama; Tuscaloosa, Alabama

Inter-group

8:00am CST	San Diego State	1–0	Michigan	Field 12
Thu, November 20		Report		Stadium: University of Alabama; Tuscaloosa, Alabama

2:00pm CST	Delaware	0–2	Colorado State	Field 10
Thu, November 20		Report		Stadium: University of Alabama; Tuscaloosa, Alabama

Group B
Pool 1
Pos	Team	Pld	W	D	L	GF	GA	GD	Pts	Qualification
1	Minnesota	2	1	0	1	4	3	+1	3	Advanced to knockout stage
2	Arizona State	2	1	0	1	1	3	−2	3	Advanced to knockout stage
3	Cornell	2	0	0	2	0	2	−2	0	Consolation
Pool 2
Pos	Team	Pld	W	D	L	GF	GA	GD	Pts	Qualification
1	Illinois	2	2	0	0	6	2	+4	6	Advanced to knockout stage
2	Auburn	2	2	0	0	5	1	+4	6	Advanced to knockout stage
3	Oklahoma State	2	0	0	2	2	7	−5	0	Consolation

SCORES

Subgroup 1

8:00am CST	Cornell	0–1	Arizona State	Field 6
Thu, November 20		Report		Stadium: University of Alabama; Tuscaloosa, Alabama

2:00pm CST	Arizona State	0–3	Minnesota	Field 7
Thu, November 20		Report		Stadium: University of Alabama; Tuscaloosa, Alabama

Subgroup 2

8:00am CST	Oklahoma State	1–4	Auburn	Field 8
Thu, November 20		Report		Stadium: University of Alabama; Tuscaloosa, Alabama

2:00pm CST	Illinois	3–1	Oklahoma State	Field 8
Thu, November 20		Report		Stadium: University of Alabama; Tuscaloosa, Alabama

Inter-group

8:00am CST	Minnesota	1–3	Illinois	Field 7
Thu, November 20		Report		Stadium: University of Alabama; Tuscaloosa, Alabama

2:00pm CST	Auburn	1–0	Cornell	Field 6
Thu, November 20		Report		Stadium: University of Alabama; Tuscaloosa, Alabama

Group C
Pool 1
Pos	Team	Pld	W	D	L	GF	GA	GD	Pts	Qualification
1	Mississippi State	2	2	0	0	3	0	+3	6	Advanced to knockout stage
2	Arizona	2	2	0	0	2	0	+2	6	Advanced to knockout stage
3	Navy	2	0	0	2	0	3	−3	0	Consolation
Pool 2
Pos	Team	Pld	W	D	L	GF	GA	GD	Pts	Qualification
1	Michigan State	2	1	0	1	3	2	+1	3	Advanced to knockout stage
2	UC Berkeley	2	1	0	1	5	5	0	3	Advanced to knockout stage
3	Kansas	2	0	0	2	2	5	−3	0	Consolation

SCORES

Subgroup 1

12:00pm CST	Arizona	1–0	Navy	Field 1
Thu, November 20		Report		Stadium: University of Alabama; Tuscaloosa, Alabama

6:00pm CST	Navy	0–2	Mississippi State	Field 2
Thu, November 20		Report		Stadium: University of Alabama; Tuscaloosa, Alabama

Subgroup 2

12:00pm CST	UC Berkeley	1–3	Michigan State	Field 6
Thu, November 20		Report		Stadium: University of Alabama; Tuscaloosa, Alabama

6:00pm CST	Kansas	2–4	UC Berkeley	Field 6
Thu, November 20		Report		Stadium: University of Alabama; Tuscaloosa, Alabama

Inter-group

12:00pm CST	Mississippi State	1–0	Kansas	Field 2
Thu, November 20		Report		Stadium: University of Alabama; Tuscaloosa, Alabama

6:00pm CST	Michigan State	0–1	Arizona	Field 1
Thu, November 20		Report		Stadium: University of Alabama; Tuscaloosa, Alabama

Group D
Pool 1
Pos	Team	Pld	W	D	L	GF	GA	GD	Pts	Qualification
1	Texas A&M	2	1	0	1	3	3	0	3	Advanced to knockout stage
2	Utah Valley State	2	1	0	1	4	4	0	3	Advanced to knockout stage
3	Virginia	2	0	0	2	3	5	−2	0	Consolation
Pool 2
Pos	Team	Pld	W	D	L	GF	GA	GD	Pts	Qualification
1	Weber State	2	2	0	0	3	1	+2	6	Advanced to knockout stage
2	Purdue	2	1	0	1	4	2	+2	3	Advanced to knockout stage
3	Colorado	2	1	0	1	3	5	−2	3	Consolation

SCORES

Subgroup 1

12:00pm CST	Virginia	1–2	Utah Valley State	Field 7
Thu, November 20		Report		Stadium: University of Alabama; Tuscaloosa, Alabama

6:00pm CST	Utah Valley State	2–3	Texas A&M	Field 8
Thu, November 20		Report		Stadium: University of Alabama; Tuscaloosa, Alabama

Subgroup 2

12:00pm CST	Purdue	3–0	Colorado	Field 10
Thu, November 20		Report		Stadium: University of Alabama; Tuscaloosa, Alabama

6:00pm CST	Weber State	2–1	Purdue	Field 10
Thu, November 20		Report		Stadium: University of Alabama; Tuscaloosa, Alabama

Inter-group

12:00pm CST	Texas A&M	0–1	Weber State	Field 8
Thu, November 20		Report		Stadium: University of Alabama; Tuscaloosa, Alabama

6:00pm CST	Colorado	3–2	Virginia	Field 7
Thu, November 20		Report		Stadium: University of Alabama; Tuscaloosa, Alabama

=== Women's championship ===
Group A
Pos	Team	Pld	W	D	L	GF	GA	GD	Pts	Qualification
1	Miami (OH)	3	3	0	0	3	0	+3	9	Advanced to knockout stage
2	San Diego State	3	1	1	1	3	3	0	4	Advanced to knockout stage
3	JMU	3	0	2	1	2	3	−1	2	
4	Texas A&M	3	0	1	2	2	4	−2	1	

Scores

8:00am CST	Miami (OH)	1–0	San Diego State	Field 1
Thu, November 20		Report		Stadium: University of Alabama; Tuscaloosa, Alabama

8:00am CST	Texas A&M	1–1	JMU	Field 2
Thu, November 20		Report		Stadium: University of Alabama; Tuscaloosa, Alabama

2:00pm CST	JMU	0–1	Miami (OH)	Field 1
Thu, November 20		Report		Stadium: University of Alabama; Tuscaloosa, Alabama

2:00pm CST	San Diego State	2–1	Texas A&M	Field 2
Thu, November 20		Report		Stadium: University of Alabama; Tuscaloosa, Alabama

8:00am CST	Miami (OH)	1–0	Texas A&M	Field 7
Fri, November 21		Report		Stadium: University of Alabama; Tuscaloosa, Alabama

8:00am CST	JMU	1–1	San Diego State	Field 9
Fri, November 21		Report		Stadium: University of Alabama; Tuscaloosa, Alabama

Group B
Pos	Team	Pld	W	D	L	GF	GA	GD	Pts	Qualification
1	Colorado State	3	3	0	0	6	0	+6	9	Advanced to knockout stage
2	Purdue	3	2	0	1	4	6	−2	6	Advanced to knockout stage
3	Florida	3	0	1	2	3	5	−2	1	
4	Maryland	3	0	1	2	1	3	−2	1	

Scores

10:00am CST	Florida	2–3	Purdue	Field 1
Thu, November 20		Report		Stadium: University of Alabama; Tuscaloosa, Alabama

10:00am CST	Colorado State	1–0	Maryland	Field 2
Thu, November 20		Report		Stadium: University of Alabama; Tuscaloosa, Alabama

4:00pm CST	Maryland	1–1	Florida	Field 1
Thu, November 20		Report		Stadium: University of Alabama; Tuscaloosa, Alabama

4:00pm CST	Purdue	0–4	Colorado State	Field 2
Thu, November 20		Report		Stadium: University of Alabama; Tuscaloosa, Alabama

8:00am CST	Florida	0–1	Colorado State	Field 5
Fri, November 21		Report		Stadium: University of Alabama; Tuscaloosa, Alabama

8:00am CST	Maryland	0–1	Purdue	Field 6
Fri, November 21		Report		Stadium: University of Alabama; Tuscaloosa, Alabama

Group C
Pos	Team	Pld	W	D	L	GF	GA	GD	Pts	Qualification
1	Colorado	3	3	0	0	8	0	+8	9	Advanced to knockout stage
2	Penn State	3	2	0	1	4	3	+1	6	Advanced to knockout stage
3	Ohio State	3	1	0	2	4	7	−3	3	
4	Baylor	3	0	0	3	1	7	−6	0	

Scores

10:00am CST	Colorado	5–0	Ohio State	Field 3
Thu, November 20		Report		Stadium: University of Alabama; Tuscaloosa, Alabama

10:00am CST	Baylor	1–2	Penn State	Field 4
Thu, November 20		Report		Stadium: University of Alabama; Tuscaloosa, Alabama

4:00pm CST	Penn State	0–1	Colorado	Field 3
Thu, November 20		Report		Stadium: University of Alabama; Tuscaloosa, Alabama

4:00pm CST	Ohio State	3–0	Baylor	Field 4
Thu, November 20		Report		Stadium: University of Alabama; Tuscaloosa, Alabama

8:00am CST	Colorado	2–0	Baylor	Field 3
Fri, November 21		Report		Stadium: University of Alabama; Tuscaloosa, Alabama

8:00am CST	Penn State	2–1	Ohio State	Field 4
Fri, November 21		Report		Stadium: University of Alabama; Tuscaloosa, Alabama

Group D
Pos	Team	Pld	W	D	L	GF	GA	GD	Pts	Qualification
1	UC-Santa Barbara	3	3	0	0	9	1	+8	9	Advanced to knockout stage
2	Virginia	3	2	0	1	4	4	0	6	Advanced to knockout stage
3	Michigan	3	1	0	2	4	5	−1	3	
4	Texas	3	0	0	3	2	9	−7	0	

Scores

10:00am CST	UC-Santa Barbara	3–0	Texas	Field 8
Thu, November 20		Report		Stadium: University of Alabama; Tuscaloosa, Alabama

10:00am CST	Michigan	0–1	Virginia	Field 9
Thu, November 20		Report		Stadium: University of Alabama; Tuscaloosa, Alabama

4:00pm CST	Virginia	1–3	UC-Santa Barbara	Field 8
Thu, November 20		Report		Stadium: University of Alabama; Tuscaloosa, Alabama

6:00pm CST	Texas	1–4	Michigan	Field 5
Thu, November 20		Report		Stadium: University of Alabama; Tuscaloosa, Alabama

8:00am CST	UC-Santa Barbara	3–0	Michigan	Field 1
Fri, November 21		Report		Stadium: University of Alabama; Tuscaloosa, Alabama

8:00am CST	Virginia	2–1	Texas	Field 2
Fri, November 21		Report		Stadium: University of Alabama; Tuscaloosa, Alabama

=== Men's open ===
Group E
Pos	Team	Pld	W	D	L	GF	GA	GD	Pts	Qualification
1	UC-Santa Barbara	3	3	0	0	19	1	+18	9	Advanced to knockout stage
2	Iowa State	3	2	0	1	15	3	+12	6	Advanced to knockout stage
3	Ohio University	3	1	0	2	6	9	−3	3	
4	Southern Mississippi	3	0	0	3	0	27	−27	0	

Scores

10:00am CST	UC-Santa Barbara	2–1	Iowa State	Field 5
Thu, November 20		Report		Stadium: University of Alabama; Tuscaloosa, Alabama

10:00am CST	Ohio	5–0	Southern Miss	Field 6
Thu, November 20		Report		Stadium: University of Alabama; Tuscaloosa, Alabama

4:00pm CST	Southern Miss	0–10	UC-Santa Barbara	Field 5
Thu, November 20		Report		Stadium: University of Alabama; Tuscaloosa, Alabama

4:00pm CST	Iowa State	2–1	Ohio	Field 6
Thu, November 20		Report		Stadium: University of Alabama; Tuscaloosa, Alabama

12:00pm CST	UC-Santa Barbara	7–0	Ohio	Field 1
Fri, November 21		Report		Stadium: University of Alabama; Tuscaloosa, Alabama

12:00pm CST	Southern Miss	0–12	Iowa State	Field 2
Fri, November 21		Report		Stadium: University of Alabama; Tuscaloosa, Alabama

Group F
Pos	Team	Pld	W	D	L	GF	GA	GD	Pts	Qualification
1	JMU	3	2	1	0	4	2	+2	7	Advanced to knockout stage
2	Florida State	3	1	1	1	5	5	0	4	Advanced to knockout stage
3	Cornell "United"	3	1	1	1	6	3	+3	4	
4	North Dakota State	3	0	1	2	6	11	−5	1	

Scores

10:00am CST	Cornell	0–1	Florida State	Field 7
Thu, November 20		Report		Stadium: University of Alabama; Tuscaloosa, Alabama

10:00am CST	JMU	2–1	North Dakota State	Field 10
Thu, November 20		Report		Stadium: University of Alabama; Tuscaloosa, Alabama

4:00pm CST	North Dakota State	1–5	Cornell	Field 7
Thu, November 20		Report		Stadium: University of Alabama; Tuscaloosa, Alabama

8:00pm CST	Florida State	0–1	JMU	Field 5
Thu, November 20		Report		Stadium: University of Alabama; Tuscaloosa, Alabama

12:00pm CST	Cornell	1–1	JMU	Field 5
Fri, November 21		Report		Stadium: University of Alabama; Tuscaloosa, Alabama

12:00pm CST	North Dakota State	4–4	Florida State	Field 6
Fri, November 21		Report		Stadium: University of Alabama; Tuscaloosa, Alabama

Group G
Pos	Team	Pld	W	D	L	GF	GA	GD	Pts	Qualification
1	Vanderbilt	3	2	1	0	8	4	+4	7	Advanced to knockout stage
2	Wisconsin (Eau Claire)	3	2	1	0	7	4	+3	7	Advanced to knockout stage
3	Central Washington	3	1	0	2	10	8	+2	3	
4	Grand Valley State	3	0	0	3	3	12	−9	0	

Scores

10:00am CST	Vanderbilt	4–2	Central Washington	Field 11
Thu, November 20		Report		Stadium: University of Alabama; Tuscaloosa, Alabama

10:00am CST	Grand Valley State	1–3	UW-Eau Claire	Field 12
Thu, November 20		Report		Stadium: University of Alabama; Tuscaloosa, Alabama

8:00pm CST	UW-Eau Claire	2–2	Vanderbilt	Field 7
Thu, November 20		Report		Stadium: University of Alabama; Tuscaloosa, Alabama

8:00pm CST	Central Washington	7–2	Grand Valley State	Field 8
Thu, November 20		Report		Stadium: University of Alabama; Tuscaloosa, Alabama

12:00pm CST	Vanderbilt	2–0	Grand Valley State	Field 7
Fri, November 21		Report		Stadium: University of Alabama; Tuscaloosa, Alabama

12:00pm CST	UW-Eau Claire	2–1	Central Washington	Field 8
Fri, November 21		Report		Stadium: University of Alabama; Tuscaloosa, Alabama

Group H
Pos	Team	Pld	W	D	L	GF	GA	GD	Pts	Qualification
1	Penn State	3	3	0	0	10	2	+8	9	Advanced to knockout stage
2	Alabama	3	2	0	1	4	5	−1	6	Advanced to knockout stage
3	Texas "B"	3	1	0	2	4	7	−3	3	
4	Oregon	3	0	0	3	5	9	−4	0	

Scores

12:00pm CST	Penn State	3–0	Alabama	Field 11
Thu, November 20		Report		Stadium: University of Alabama; Tuscaloosa, Alabama

12:00pm CST	Oregon	2–3	Texas "B"	Field 12
Thu, November 20		Report		Stadium: University of Alabama; Tuscaloosa, Alabama

8:00pm CST	Texas "B"	0–3	Penn State	Field 1
Thu, November 20		Report		Stadium: University of Alabama; Tuscaloosa, Alabama

8:00pm CST	Alabama	2–1	Oregon	Field 2
Thu, November 20		Report		Stadium: University of Alabama; Tuscaloosa, Alabama

12:00pm CST	Penn State	4–2	Oregon	Field 3
Fri, November 21		Report		Stadium: University of Alabama; Tuscaloosa, Alabama

12:00pm CST	Texas "B"	1–2	Alabama	Field 4
Fri, November 21		Report		Stadium: University of Alabama; Tuscaloosa, Alabama

=== Women's open ===
Group E
Pos	Team	Pld	W	D	L	GF	GA	GD	Pts	Qualification
1	UCLA	3	3	0	0	10	1	+9	9	Advanced to knockout stage
2	Cornell	3	2	0	1	4	3	+1	6	Advanced to knockout stage
3	Illinois	3	1	0	2	2	6	−4	3	
4	Georgia Tech	3	0	0	3	0	6	−6	0	

Scores

8:00am CST	UCLA	2–1	Cornell	Field 3
Thu, November 20		Report		Stadium: University of Alabama; Tuscaloosa, Alabama

8:00am CST	Illinois	1–0	Georgia Tech	Field 4
Thu, November 20		Report		Stadium: University of Alabama; Tuscaloosa, Alabama

2:00pm CST	Georgia Tech	0–4	UCLA	Field 3
Thu, November 20		Report		Stadium: University of Alabama; Tuscaloosa, Alabama

2:00pm CST	Cornell	2–1	Illinois	Field 4
Thu, November 20		Report		Stadium: University of Alabama; Tuscaloosa, Alabama

10:00am CST	UCLA	4–0	Illinois	Field 7
Fri, November 21		Report		Stadium: University of Alabama; Tuscaloosa, Alabama

10:00am CST	Georgia Tech	0–1	Cornell	Field 9
Fri, November 21		Report		Stadium: University of Alabama; Tuscaloosa, Alabama

Group F
Pos	Team	Pld	W	D	L	GF	GA	GD	Pts	Qualification
1	UC Berkeley	3	3	0	0	6	0	+6	9	Advanced to knockout stage
2	Colorado State "Green"	3	2	0	1	7	2	+5	6	Advanced to knockout stage
3	Michigan State	3	1	0	2	4	6	−2	3	
4	Iowa State	3	0	0	3	1	10	−9	0	

Scores

8:00am CST	Michigan State	0–2	UC-Berkeley	Field 5
Thu, November 20		Report		Stadium: University of Alabama; Tuscaloosa, Alabama

8:00am CST	Iowa State	0–4	Colorado State	Field 9
Thu, November 20		Report		Stadium: University of Alabama; Tuscaloosa, Alabama

2:00pm CST	Colorado State	3–1	Michigan State	Field 5
Thu, November 20		Report		Stadium: University of Alabama; Tuscaloosa, Alabama

2:00pm CST	UC-Berkeley	3–0	Iowa State	Field 9
Thu, November 20		Report		Stadium: University of Alabama; Tuscaloosa, Alabama

10:00am CST	Michigan State	3–1	Iowa State	Field 5
Fri, November 21		Report		Stadium: University of Alabama; Tuscaloosa, Alabama

10:00am CST	Colorado State	0–1	UC-Berkeley	Field 6
Fri, November 21		Report		Stadium: University of Alabama; Tuscaloosa, Alabama

Group G
Pos	Team	Pld	W	D	L	GF	GA	GD	Pts	Qualification
1	Colorado "Black"	3	3	0	0	12	1	+11	9	Advanced to knockout stage
2	Ohio University	3	2	0	1	6	6	0	6	Advanced to knockout stage
3	Georgia College	3	0	1	2	1	5	−4	1	
4	LSU	3	0	1	2	3	10	−7	1	

Scores

12:00pm CST	Colorado	4–1	Ohio	Field 3
Thu, November 20		Report		Stadium: University of Alabama; Tuscaloosa, Alabama

12:00pm CST	LSU	1–1	Georgia College	Field 4
Thu, November 20		Report		Stadium: University of Alabama; Tuscaloosa, Alabama

6:00pm CST	Georgia College	0–3	Colorado	Field 3
Thu, November 20		Report		Stadium: University of Alabama; Tuscaloosa, Alabama

6:00pm CST	Ohio	4–2	LSU	Field 4
Thu, November 20		Report		Stadium: University of Alabama; Tuscaloosa, Alabama

10:00am CST	Colorado	5–0	LSU	Field 3
Fri, November 21		Report		Stadium: University of Alabama; Tuscaloosa, Alabama

10:00am CST	Georgia College	0–1	Ohio	Field 4
Fri, November 21		Report		Stadium: University of Alabama; Tuscaloosa, Alabama

Group H
Pos	Team	Pld	W	D	L	GF	GA	GD	Pts	Qualification
1	Kansas	3	2	1	0	11	1	+10	7	Advanced to knockout stage
2	Arizona	3	2	1	0	8	1	+7	7	Advanced to knockout stage
3	Vermont	3	1	0	2	2	6	−4	3	
4	Alabama	3	0	0	3	1	14	−13	0	

Scores

12:00pm CST	Arizona	4–0	Alabama	Field 5
Thu, November 20		Report		Stadium: University of Alabama; Tuscaloosa, Alabama

12:00pm CST	Kansas	2–0	Vermont	Field 9
Thu, November 20		Report		Stadium: University of Alabama; Tuscaloosa, Alabama

8:00pm CST	Vermont	0–3	Arizona	Field 4
Thu, November 20		Report		Stadium: University of Alabama; Tuscaloosa, Alabama

8:00pm CST	Alabama	0–8	Kansas	Field 3
Thu, November 20		Report		Stadium: University of Alabama; Tuscaloosa, Alabama

10:00am CST	Arizona	1–1	Kansas	Field 1
Fri, November 21		Report		Stadium: University of Alabama; Tuscaloosa, Alabama

10:00am CST	Vermont	2–1	Alabama	Field 2
Fri, November 21		Report		Stadium: University of Alabama; Tuscaloosa, Alabama

== Tournament bracket ==
=== Men's championship ===
Sweet 16
Fri • 8:00am • Field 8
Colorado State	4
Arizona State	0
Fri • 8:00am • Field 10
Michigan State	2
Purdue	0
Fri • 8:00am • Field 11
Illinois (a.e.t.)	1
Clemson	0
Fri • 8:00am • Field 12
Texas A&M	6
Arizona	2
Fri • 10:00am • Field 8
Michigan	3
Auburn	4
Fri • 10:00am • Field 10
Mississippi State	1
Utah Valley State (pen.)	2
Fri • 10:00am • Field 11
Weber State	1
UC Berkeley	0
Fri • 10:00am • Field 12
Minnesota	2
Texas	1

Quarterfinals
Fri • 3:00pm • Field 5
Colorado State	3
Michigan State	1
Fri • 3:00pm • Field 6
Illinois	4
Texas A&M	2
Fri • 5:00pm • Field 8
Auburn	1
Utah Valley State	4
Fri • 5:00pm • Field 5
Weber State	0
Minnesota	1

Semifinals
Sat • 10:00am • Field 5
Colorado State	0
Illinois (Note: Illinois relinquished all awards due to ineligible players.)	4
Sat • 10:00am • Field 6
Utah Valley State	1
Minnesota	0

Final
Sat • 5:00pm • Field 8
Illinois	2
Utah Valley State	0

==== Men's consolation ====
Quarterfinals
Fri • 3:00pm • Field 7
San Diego State	1
Oklahoma State	0
Fri • 3:00pm • Field 8
Colorado	0
Navy	1
Fri • 5:00pm • Field 6
Cornell	0
Virginia	2
Fri • 5:00pm • Field 7
Kansas	0
Delaware	1

Semifinals
Sat • 8:00am • Field 1
San Diego State	4
Navy	1
Sat • 8:00am • Field 2
Virginia	3
Delaware	1

Final
Sat • 1:00pm • Field 2
San Diego State	3
Virginia	2

=== Women's championship ===
Quarterfinals
Fri • 3:00pm • Field 1
Miami (OH)	2
Purdue	1
Fri • 3:00pm • Field 2
UC-Santa Barbara	2
Penn State	1
Fri • 3:00pm • Field 3
Colorado State	2
Virginia	1
Fri • 3:00pm • Field 4
Colorado	2
San Diego State	1

Semifinals
Sat • 10:00am • Field 1
Miami (OH)	1
UC-Santa Barbara	0
Sat • 10:00am • Field 2
Colorado State	0
Colorado (pen.)	1

Final
Sat • 3:00pm • Field 8
Miami (OH)	0
Colorado	1

=== Men's open ===
Quarterfinals
Fri • 7:00pm • Field 1
UC-Santa Barbara	3
Florida State	0
Fri • 7:00pm • Field 2
Penn State (pen.)	2
UW-Eau Claire	1
Fri • 7:00pm • Field 5
JMU (pen.)	1
Alabama	0
Fri • 7:00pm • Field 6
Vanderbilt	3
Iowa State	2

Semifinals
Sat • 8:00am • Field 5
UC-Santa Barbara (pen.)	1
Penn State	0
Sat • 8:00am • Field 6
JMU	2
Vanderbilt	1

Final
Sat • 1:00pm • Field 5
UC-Santa Barbara	1
JMU	0

=== Women's open ===
Quarterfinals
Fri • 5:00pm • Field 1
UCLA	2
Colorado State "Green"	0
Fri • 5:00pm • Field 2
Kansas	3
Ohio University	2
Fri • 5:00pm • Field 3
UC-Berkeley	0
Arizona (pen.)	1
Fri • 5:00pm • Field 4
Colorado "Black" (pen.)	1
Cornell	0

Semifinals
Sat • 8:00am • Field 3
UCLA	0
Kansas	1
Sat • 8:00am • Field 4
Arizona	3
Colorado	1

Final
Sat • 1:00pm • Field 7
Kansas	2
Arizona (pen.)	3

== All-tournament teams ==
Key
MVP
Best goalkeeper

=== Men's championship ===
Name	Team
Tyson Masar (Note: Illinois relinquished all awards due to ineligible players.)	Illinois
Walter Musumeci	Illinois
Keith Hormel	Illinois
Nelvin Wilson	Utah Valley State
Justin Wagar	Utah Valley State
Stewart Hudspeth	Auburn
Billy Cooksey	Colorado State
Jeremy Etzkorn	Illinois
Mike Balla	Utah Valley State
Bill Besançon	Texas A&M
Daniel Spakowicz	Minnesota
Tory Waters	Weber State
Outstanding sportsmanship
Oklahoma State

=== Women's championship ===
Name	Team
Kim Lipman	Colorado
Kim Lipman	Colorado
Ryann McDonald	Colorado
Sarah Kovarik	UC-Santa Barbara
Kerry Greer	Colorado State
Rachel Lehman	Miami (OH)
Jessie Chrismer	Colorado
Vida TaFoya	UC-Santa Barbara
Sara Zach	Colorado State
Ashley Felter	Miami (OH)
Samantha Picraux	Colorado
Kelly Pordon	Purdue
Avygail Austria	San Diego State
Outstanding sportsmanship
Colorado State

=== Men's open ===
Name	Team
Chris Hughes	UC-Santa Barbara
Alberto Corona	UC-Santa Barbara
Georgi Milosevski	UC-Santa Barbara
Brook Taylor	UC-Santa Barbara
Daniel McCormick	Vanderbilt
Jonathan Toub	Vanderbilt
Esli Feliz	Penn State
Andy Deak	Penn State
Andrew Richardson	JMU
Quan Phan	JMU
Alexis Koppius	JMU
Jeremy Engel	JMU

=== Women's open ===
Name	Team
Kamaya Damwijk	Arizona
Beth Tybor	Arizona
Amy Roller	Kansas
Breanah Glynn	Colorado
Elizabeth St. John	UCLA
Andrea Gastelum	Arizona
Sarah Armand	Arizona
Amanda Williams	Kansas
Tess Piete	Colorado
Genevieve Painter	UCLA
Erica Aber	Ohio
Lizzy Reisman	UC-Berkeley
