= 2001 NIRSA National Soccer Championship =

- League: NIRSA
- Sport: Soccer
- Site: University of Alabama; Tuscaloosa, Alabama
- Duration: November 15–17, 2001
- Teams: 16 (men's championship); 16 (women's championship); 24 (men's open); 16 (women's open)
- Results: Official Results

Men's Championship Division
- Score: 4–0
- Champion: BYU (5th title, 5th title game)
- Runners-up: Illinois (1st title game)
- Season MVP: John Morris (BYU)

Women's Championship Division
- Score: 1–0
- Champion: Penn State (1st title, 3rd title game)
- Runners-up: UC-Santa Barbara (1st title game)
- Season MVP: Marcia Haradon (Penn State)

Men's Open Division
- Score: 3–2
- Champion: Ohio State (1st title, 1st title game)
- Runners-up: Texas Tech (3rd title game)
- Season MVP: Ian Gordona (Ohio State)

Women's Open Division
- Score: 2–1 (a.e.t.)
- Champion: Colorado "Black" (1st title, 1st title game)
- Runners-up: Ohio State (2nd title game)
- Top seed: Jessie Chrismer (Colorado "Black")

NIRSA national soccer championships seasons
- ← 2000 2002 →

The 2001 NIRSA national soccer championship was the 8th NIRSA National Soccer Championships, the annual national championships for United States-based, collegiate club soccer teams organized by NIRSA. It took place at The University of Alabama in Tuscaloosa, Alabama from Thursday, November 15 to Saturday, November 17, 2001.

== Overview ==
=== Men's championship ===
In the finals, four-time champions, BYU, would return to their 5th finals to face finals debutants, Illinois. In the group stage, BYU would win all three games, first beating Cornell 4–0, then North Carolina 3–0, and finally 1995 champions Texas 4–3, making them a shutout short of a perfect group stage performance. Meanwhile, Illinois would beat Miami (OH) 3–2, then would lose to Weber State 2–3, but would win their finale against Navy 4–1 to win their group on the head-to-head tiebreaker after drawing to Miami (OH) on points.

In the knockout round, Illinois would defeat North Carolina 4–3 in the quarterfinals then would beat Michigan 1–0 in overtime to reach their first finals. Meanwhile, BYU would beat SCSL (now SCSA) tournament runners-up Mississippi State 7–1. Then, in a rematch of the previous year's semifinals where BYU's 4-title run and 28-game national championship win streak was broken by eventual champions, Penn State, in penalties. This time, the match was won by BYU 4–1, ending Penn State's own 53-game win streak. Penn State notably had Anthony Calvano, who following this season would walk onto Penn State's varsity team and eventually play in the USL Second Division and USL Pro. In the finals, BYU would defeat Illinois 4–0, including a goal from sophomore Matt Affleck winning their 5th title in 6 years. BYU's goalkeeper, John Morris, would be named MVP after posting 3 shutouts.

=== Women's championship ===
In the finals, back-to-back runners-up in 1997 and 1998, and regional champions Penn State, would face the first region 6 team to make the women's championship finals, UC-Santa Barbara in their second year as a club. Prior to this, in the group stage, UC-Santa Barbara would win their opener 3–1 against Georgia with goals from junior Monique Gregoine, sophomore Vida Tafoya, and sophomore Sarah Battin. They then defeated two-time champion and regional runners-up Miami (OH) 2–1 with goals from senior co-captain Jessica Duggan and freshman Marina Karag. Their group stage finale ended in a 1–1 draw with a goal from sophomore Sarah Battin against 2nd in the group, Delaware, giving UC-Santa Barbara the first seed in the group. Meanwhile, Penn State would win their opener 2–1 against Illinois, then would draw their second match 0–0 against Texas A&M, and despite losing their finale 1–0 against Arizona, a Texas A&M loss ensured Penn State would advance with the second place in the group.

In the knockout round, UC-Santa Barbara beat Michigan State 1–0 in the quarterfinals with a goal from senior co-captain Alison Conway; then, following a 1–1 draw in regulation where UCSB's freshman Veronica Noone scored and a scoreless overtime, would defeat Arizona after 9 rounds of a penalty shootout in the semifinals to advance to their first finals. Meanwhile, Penn State would defeat two-time champion, Colorado, in penalties following a 3–3 draw in the quarterfinals, then would beat reigning champion, Michigan, 3–2 in the semifinals to advance to their third finals in 5 years. In the finals, Penn State would score the lone goal of the game and claim their first national title. Penn State's Marcia Haradon would go on to be named MVP.

=== Men's open ===
In the finals, 1997 open champions and three straight championship runners-up from 1998–2000, Texas Tech, would face finals debutants, Ohio State. In the group stage, Texas Tech would win their opener 3–2 over Northern Arizona and draw with Georgia Tech 1–1 in their finale. Meanwhile, Ohio State would defeat MTSU 2–0 in their opener then lost 0–2 to Rice on goals from Rice's Mark Doughty and Blake Borgeson. Facing a potential elimination without any games left to play, a 1-0 Rice win over MTSU in the group stage finale secured Ohio State's spot in the knockout round as the two seed in their group where they'd face Florida.

In the round of 16, both teams would score 7 goals with Ohio State defeating Florida 7–1 and Texas Tech defeating Georgia Southern 7–0. In the quarterfinals, Ohio State would beat Kansas 2–1 to advance to the Saturday semifinals where they would defeat Arizona 4–1 to advance to their first finals. Meanwhile, Texas Tech would face Utah Valley State in the quarterfinals and scored two goals early then received a red card but were able to hold them off 2–1 to advance to the semifinals where they defeated the back-to-back, reigning champions, JMU, 3–0. In the finals, Ohio State would defeat Texas Tech 3–2 to claim their first title. Ohio State's sophomore, Ian Gordona, would go on to be named MVP. The following year, Gordona would attempt to walk on to the varsity team but would be unsuccessful; however, he later would be named the assistant coach of the varsity team in 2014.

=== Women's open ===
In the finals, inaugural champions and reigning championship runners-up, Ohio State, would take on finals debutants Colorado's "Black" team, also known as their B-team, in a rematch of their group stage opener. In the opener, Colorado would defeat Ohio State 2–1 but despite this, Ohio State would win the group after they beat Texas Tech 5–0 and Florida 2–0 while Colorado would beat Florida 2–0 but would lose to Texas Tech 0–1.

In the quarterfinals, Colorado "Black" would take on their in-state rival, Colorado State's, "Green" team, also known as their B-team, which Colorado would win 4–1 while Ohio State would defeat Kansas, in a rematch of the inaugural 1995 open title game, 2–0. In the semifinals, Colorado would defeat reigning open champions, Virginia, 2–0 to advance to their first finals while Ohio State would defeat Princeton 1–0 to reach their second finals. In the finals, the game would be tied 1–1 after regulation, but Colorado "Black" would score a golden goal in overtime to defeat Ohio State and claim their first open title. Colorado sophomore Jessie Chrismer of the "Black" team would go on to be named division MVP. Following this tournament, Chrismer would walk on to Colorado's varsity team where she would appear in 5 matches and would record a single assist which was against Oklahoma on October 25, 2002, to Kristina Lamberty in what would end up being the game winner.

== Format ==
The competition consisted of 72 teams partitioned into 40 men's teams and 32 women's teams. Each of these partitions were further divided into an invite-only championship division and an open division. The men's open division had 24 teams divided into eight groups of three teams each while the remaining three divisions had 16 teams divided into four groups of four. All 4 divisions began with a round-robin tournament where teams played each of the other teams in their group once. Following this, the two best teams in each group advanced to a single-elimination, knockout round. The first metric for determining the best team was points, calculated first by giving a team 6 points for a win, 3 points for a tie, and 0 points for a loss. Then, a team could be awarded an addition point for a shutout and an additional point for every goal scored, up to a max of 3 goals per game. If teams were tied on points, the following criteria were used in order:

1. Winner of head-to-head competition
2. Greatest goal difference
3. Most goals scored
4. Coin toss

The knockout stage was a 16-team tournament for the men's open division and an 8-team tournament for the remaining divisions. To ensure all teams played three games, the men's open division had a consolation knockout stage which was also an 8-team tournament composed of the team that finished last in their group. Knockout stage games needed to declare a winner, so if one was tied at the end of regulation, overtime would begin. Overtime in the round of 16 and quarterfinals consisted of two, 5-minute, golden-goal periods while in the semifinals and finals, overtime consisted of two, 10-minute, golden-goal periods. If still tied after overtime, kicks from the mark would determine the winner. Pool play and quarterfinal games were two 40-minute halves, separated by a seven-minute halftime with the semifinals and finals also being 40-minute halves, but having a ten-minute halftime. If a player received three yellow cards during the course of the tournament they would be suspended the following the game.

== Qualification and selections ==
NIRSA extended invitations to the 16 men's and 16 women's teams to participate in the championship division beginning on October 22, 2001, with those invitations being extend to who NIRSA believed were the best in the nation. The teams that participated in the open division were chosen on a first-come first-serve basis with registration beginning on September 3, 2001.

=== Men's championship ===
Participating teams
Region	Team	Appearance	Last Bid
I	Penn State	5th	2000
I	Navy	3rd	2000
I	Cornell	2nd	2000
II	North Carolina	3rd	1997
II	Clemson	3rd	1998
II	Mississippi State	2nd	1999
III	Miami (OH)	4th	1999
III	Illinois	3rd	2000
III	Michigan	2nd	1999
IV	Texas	6th	1998
IV	Texas A&M	3rd	1997
V	Colorado State	5th	2000
V	Minnesota	1st	Never
VI	BYU	6th	2000
VI	Weber State	3rd	2000
VI	UC Santa Barabara	1st	Never

=== Women's championship ===
Participating teams
Region	Team	Appearance	Last Bid
I	Penn State	7th	2000
I	Delaware	3rd	2000
II	JMU	5th	1999
II	Virginia Tech	4th	2000
II	Georgia	1st	Never
III	Miami (OH)	8th	2000
III	Illinois	5th	1999
III	Michigan	3rd	2000
III	Michigan State	1st	Never
IV	Texas A&M	4th	1999
IV	Baylor	3rd	2000
V	Colorado	7th	2000
V	Colorado State	5th	2000
VI	San Diego State	3rd	1999
VI	UC-Santa Barbara	2nd	2000
VI	Arizona	1st	Never

=== Men's open ===
Region	Num	Team
I	1	Cornell "United"
II	8	Alabama, Florida State, Florida, Georgia Southern, Georgia Tech, JMU, MTSU, Virginia
III	4	Grand Valley State, Michigan State, Ohio State, SIU
IV	6	Kansas, UL-Lafayette, Louisiana Tech, Rice, Texas Tech, Wichita State
V	1	Colorado State "Gold"
VI	4	Arizona, Northern Arizona, Oregon, Utah Valley State

=== Women's open ===
Region	Num	Team
I	1	Princeton
II	5	Florida, Georgia Southern, Georgia Tech, Richmond, Virginia
III	1	Ohio State
IV	5	Kansas, LSU, Rice, Texas, Texas Tech
V	3	Colorado "Black", Colorado State "Green", Colorado Mines
VI	1	Utah Valley State

== Group stage ==
=== Men's championship ===
Group A
Pos	Team	Pld	W	D	L	GF	GA	GD	SO (Note: Shutouts)	GFP (Note: Goals for, points. The points gained by scoring with a max of 3 per game)	Pts	Qualification
1	Illinois	3	2	0	1	9	6	+3	0	8	20	Advanced to knockout stage
2	Miami (OH)	3	2	0	1	8	5	+3	1	7	20	Advanced to knockout stage
3	Weber State	3	2	0	1	4	4	0	1	4	17	
4	Navy	3	0	0	3	3	9	−6	0	3	3	

8:00am CST	Navy	0–1	Weber State	Field 6
Thu, November 21		Report		Stadium: University of Alabama; Tuscaloosa, AL

8:00am CST	Illinois	3–2	Miami (OH)	Field 7
Thu, November 21		Report		Stadium: University of Alabama; Tuscaloosa, AL

2:00pm CST	Miami (OH)	4–2	Navy	Field 6
Thu, November 21		Report		Stadium: University of Alabama; Tuscaloosa, AL

2:00pm CST	Weber State	3–2	Illinois	Field 7
Thu, November 21		Report		Stadium: University of Alabama; Tuscaloosa, AL

10:00am CST	Navy	1–4	Illinois	Field 1
Fri, November 22		Report		Stadium: University of Alabama; Tuscaloosa, AL

10:00am CST	Miami (OH)	2–0	Weber State	Field 2
Fri, November 22		Report		Stadium: University of Alabama; Tuscaloosa, AL

Group B
Pos	Team	Pld	W	D	L	GF	GA	GD	SO	GFP	Pts	Qualification
1	BYU	3	3	0	0	11	3	+8	2	9	29	Advanced to knockout stage
2	North Carolina	3	2	0	1	5	5	0	0	5	17	Advanced to knockout stage
3	Texas	3	1	0	2	7	6	+1	1	7	14	
4	Cornell	3	0	0	3	1	10	−9	0	1	1	

8:00am CST	BYU	4–0	Cornell	Field 8
Thu, November 21		Report		Stadium: University of Alabama; Tuscaloosa, AL

8:00am CST	Texas	1–2	North Carolina	Field 9
Thu, November 21		Report		Stadium: University of Alabama; Tuscaloosa, AL

2:00pm CST	North Carolina	0–3	BYU	Field 8
Thu, November 21		Report		Stadium: University of Alabama; Tuscaloosa, AL

2:00pm CST	Cornell	0–3	Texas	Field 9
Thu, November 21		Report		Stadium: University of Alabama; Tuscaloosa, AL

10:00am CST	BYU	4–3	Texas	Field 3
Fri, November 22		Report		Stadium: University of Alabama; Tuscaloosa, AL

10:00am CST	North Carolina	3–1	Cornell	Field 4
Fri, November 22		Report		Stadium: University of Alabama; Tuscaloosa, AL

Group C
Pos	Team	Pld	W	D	L	GF	GA	GD	SO	GFP	Pts	Qualification
1	Penn State	3	3	0	0	5	0	+5	3	5	26	Advanced to knockout stage
2	Texas A&M	3	2	0	1	4	2	+2	1	4	17	Advanced to knockout stage
3	Clemson	3	0	1	2	2	6	−4	0	2	5	
4	UC-Santa Barbara	3	0	1	2	1	4	−3	0	1	4	

10:00am CST	UC-Santa Barbara	0–1	Penn State	Field 8
Thu, November 21		Report		Stadium: University of Alabama; Tuscaloosa, AL

10:00am CST	Clemson	1–2	Texas A&M	Field 9
Thu, November 21		Report		Stadium: University of Alabama; Tuscaloosa, AL

4:00pm CST	Texas A&M	2–0	UC-Santa Barbara	Field 8
Thu, November 21		Report		Stadium: University of Alabama; Tuscaloosa, AL

4:00pm CST	Penn State	3–0	Clemson	Field 9
Thu, November 21		Report		Stadium: University of Alabama; Tuscaloosa, AL

10:00am CST	UC-Santa Barbara	1–1	Clemson	Field 5
Fri, November 22		Report		Stadium: University of Alabama; Tuscaloosa, AL

10:00am CST	Texas A&M	0–1	Penn State	Field 6
Fri, November 22		Report		Stadium: University of Alabama; Tuscaloosa, AL

Group D
Pos	Team	Pld	W	D	L	GF	GA	GD	SO	GFP	Pts	Qualification
1	Michigan	3	2	1	0	4	2	+2	2	4	21	Advanced to knockout stage
2	Mississippi State	3	2	0	1	7	1	+6	2	5	19	Advanced to knockout stage
3	Minnesota	3	1	1	1	4	2	+2	2	3	14	
4	Colorado State	3	0	0	3	2	12	−10	0	2	2	

12:00pm CST	Minnesota	0–0	Michigan	Field 8
Thu, November 21		Report		Stadium: University of Alabama; Tuscaloosa, AL

12:00pm CST	Mississippi State	5–0	Colorado State	Field 9
Thu, November 21		Report		Stadium: University of Alabama; Tuscaloosa, AL

6:00pm CST	Colorado State	0–4	Minnesota	Field 7
Thu, November 21		Report		Stadium: University of Alabama; Tuscaloosa, AL

6:00pm CST	Michigan	1–0	Mississippi State	Field 8
Thu, November 21		Report		Stadium: University of Alabama; Tuscaloosa, AL

10:00am CST	Minnesota	0–2	Mississippi State	Field 7
Fri, November 22		Report		Stadium: University of Alabama; Tuscaloosa, AL

10:00am CST	Colorado State	2–3	Michigan	Field 8
Fri, November 22		Report		Stadium: University of Alabama; Tuscaloosa, AL

=== Women's championship ===
Group A
Pos	Team	Pld	W	D	L	GF	GA	GD	SO	GFP	Pts	Qualification
1	Michigan	3	3	0	0	10	1	+9	2	7	27	Advanced to knockout stage
2	Colorado State	3	2	0	1	4	2	+2	1	4	17	Advanced to knockout stage
3	San Diego State	3	1	0	2	3	10	−7	0	3	9	
4	JMU	3	0	0	3	2	6	−4	0	2	1	

10:00am CST	Michigan	3–1	JMU	Field 3
Thu, November 21		Report		Stadium: University of Alabama; Tuscaloosa, AL

10:00am CST	Colorado State	3–1	San Diego State	Field 4
Thu, November 21		Report		Stadium: University of Alabama; Tuscaloosa, AL

4:00pm CST	San Diego State	0–6	Michigan	Field 3
Thu, November 21		Report		Stadium: University of Alabama; Tuscaloosa, AL

4:00pm CST	JMU	0–1	Colorado State	Field 4
Thu, November 21		Report		Stadium: University of Alabama; Tuscaloosa, AL

12:00pm CST	Michigan	1–0	Colorado State	Field 1
Fri, November 22		Report		Stadium: University of Alabama; Tuscaloosa, AL

12:00pm CST	San Diego State	2–1	JMU	Field 2
Fri, November 22		Report		Stadium: University of Alabama; Tuscaloosa, AL

Group B
Pos	Team	Pld	W	D	L	GF	GA	GD	SO	GFP	Pts	Qualification
1	UC-Santa Barbara	3	2	1	0	6	3	+3	0	6	21	Advanced to knockout stage
2	Delaware	3	1	2	0	2	1	+1	2	2	16	Advanced to knockout stage
3	Miami (OH)	3	1	1	1	5	3	+2	1	4	14	
4	Georgia	3	0	0	3	2	8	−6	0	2	2	

10:00am CST	Miami (OH)	0–0	Delaware	Field 6
Thu, November 21		Report		Stadium: University of Alabama; Tuscaloosa, AL

10:00am CST	Georgia	1–3	UC-Santa Barbara	Field 7
Thu, November 21		Report		Stadium: University of Alabama; Tuscaloosa, AL

4:00pm CST	UC-Santa Barbara	2–1	Miami (OH)	Field 6
Thu, November 21		Report		Stadium: University of Alabama; Tuscaloosa, AL

4:00pm CST	Delaware	1–0	Georgia	Field 7
Thu, November 21		Report		Stadium: University of Alabama; Tuscaloosa, AL

12:00pm CST	Miami (OH)	4–1	Georgia	Field 3
Fri, November 22		Report		Stadium: University of Alabama; Tuscaloosa, AL

12:00pm CST	UC-Santa Barbara	1–1	Delaware	Field 4
Fri, November 22		Report		Stadium: University of Alabama; Tuscaloosa, AL

Group C
Pos	Team	Pld	W	D	L	GF	GA	GD	SO	GFP	Pts	Qualification
1	Arizona	3	2	1	0	2	0	+2	3	2	20	Advanced to knockout stage
2	Penn State	3	1	1	1	2	2	0	1	2	12	Advanced to knockout stage
3	Illinois	3	1	0	2	2	3	−1	1	2	9	
4	Texas A&M	3	0	2	1	0	1	−1	2	0	8	

12:00pm CST	Arizona	0–0	Texas A&M	Field 1
Thu, November 21		Report		Stadium: University of Alabama; Tuscaloosa, AL

12:00pm CST	Penn State	2–1	Illinois	Field 2
Thu, November 21		Report		Stadium: University of Alabama; Tuscaloosa, AL

6:00pm CST	Illinois	0–1	Arizona	Field 1
Thu, November 21		Report		Stadium: University of Alabama; Tuscaloosa, AL

6:00pm CST	Texas A&M	0–0	Penn State	Field 2
Thu, November 21		Report		Stadium: University of Alabama; Tuscaloosa, AL

12:00pm CST	Arizona	1–0	Penn State	Field 5
Fri, November 22		Report		Stadium: University of Alabama; Tuscaloosa, AL

12:00pm CST	Illinois	1–0	Texas A&M	Field 6
Fri, November 22		Report		Stadium: University of Alabama; Tuscaloosa, AL

Group D
Pos	Team	Pld	W	D	L	GF	GA	GD	SO	GFP	Pts	Qualification
1	Colorado	3	2	1	0	7	1	+6	2	4	21	Advanced to knockout stage
2	Michigan State	3	1	2	0	3	0	+3	3	3	18	Advanced to knockout stage
3	Virginia Tech	3	1	1	1	1	1	0	2	1	12	
4	Baylor	3	0	0	3	1	10	−9	0	1	1	

12:00pm CST	Michigan State	3–0	Baylor	Field 3
Thu, November 21		Report		Stadium: University of Alabama; Tuscaloosa, AL

12:00pm CST	Virginia Tech	0–1	Colorado	Field 4
Thu, November 21		Report		Stadium: University of Alabama; Tuscaloosa, AL

6:00pm CST	Colorado	0–0	Michigan State	Field 3
Thu, November 21		Report		Stadium: University of Alabama; Tuscaloosa, AL

6:00pm CST	Baylor	0–1	Virginia Tech	Field 4
Thu, November 21		Report		Stadium: University of Alabama; Tuscaloosa, AL

12:00pm CST	Michigan State	0–0	Virginia Tech	Field 7
Fri, November 22		Report		Stadium: University of Alabama; Tuscaloosa, AL

12:00pm CST	Colorado	6–1	Baylor	Field 8
Fri, November 22		Report		Stadium: University of Alabama; Tuscaloosa, AL

=== Men's open ===
Group E
Pos	Team	Pld	W	D	L	GF	GA	GD	SO	GFP	Pts	Qualification
1	Rice	2	2	0	0	4	1	+3	1	4	17	Advanced to knockout stage
2	Ohio State	2	1	0	1	2	2	0	1	2	9	Advanced to knockout stage
3	MTSU	2	0	0	2	1	4	−3	0	1	1	Consolation

8:00am CST	Ohio State	2–0	MTSU	Field 5
Thu, November 21		Report		Stadium: University of Alabama; Tuscaloosa, AL

1:00pm CST	Rice	2–0	Ohio State	Field 5
Thu, November 21		Report		Stadium: University of Alabama; Tuscaloosa, AL

8:00pm CST	MTSU	1–2	Rice	Field 1
Thu, November 21		Report		Stadium: University of Alabama; Tuscaloosa, AL

Group F
Pos	Team	Pld	W	D	L	GF	GA	GD	SO	GFP	Pts	Qualification
1	Texas Tech	2	1	1	0	4	3	+1	0	4	13	Advanced to knockout stage
2	Georgia Tech	2	0	2	0	2	2	0	0	2	8	Advanced to knockout stage
3	Northern Arizona	2	0	1	1	3	4	−1	0	3	6	Consolation

8:00am CST	Texas Tech	3–2	Northern Arizona	Field 10
Thu, November 21		Report		Stadium: University of Alabama; Tuscaloosa, AL

1:00pm CST	Georgia Tech	1–1	Texas Tech	Field 10
Thu, November 21		Report		Stadium: University of Alabama; Tuscaloosa, AL

8:00pm CST	Northern Arizona	1–1	Georgia Tech	Field 2
Thu, November 21		Report		Stadium: University of Alabama; Tuscaloosa, AL

Group G
Pos	Team	Pld	W	D	L	GF	GA	GD	SO	GFP	Pts	Qualification
1	JMU	2	1	1	0	4	2	+2	0	4	13	Advanced to knockout stage
2	Grand Valley State	2	1	1	0	3	2	+1	0	3	12	Advanced to knockout stage
3	UL-Lafayette	2	0	0	2	2	5	−3	0	2	2	Consolation

8:00am CST	JMU	3–1	UL-Lafayette	Field 11
Thu, November 21		Report		Stadium: University of Alabama; Tuscaloosa, AL

1:00pm CST	Grand Valley State	1–1	JMU	Field 11
Thu, November 21		Report		Stadium: University of Alabama; Tuscaloosa, AL

8:00pm CST	UL-Lafayette	1–2	Grand Valley State	Field 3
Thu, November 21		Report		Stadium: University of Alabama; Tuscaloosa, AL

Group H
Pos	Team	Pld	W	D	L	GF	GA	GD	SO	GFP	Pts	Qualification
1	SIU-Carbondale	2	1	1	0	5	3	+2	1	5	15	Advanced to knockout stage
2	Arizona	2	1	1	0	6	5	+1	0	6	15	Advanced to knockout stage
3	Florida State	2	0	0	2	2	5	−3	0	2	2	Consolation

8:00am CST	Arizona	3–2	Florida State	Field 12
Thu, November 21		Report		Stadium: University of Alabama; Tuscaloosa, AL

1:00pm CST	SIU	3–3	Arizona	Field 12
Thu, November 21		Report		Stadium: University of Alabama; Tuscaloosa, AL

8:00pm CST	Florida State	0–2	SIU	Field 4
Thu, November 21		Report		Stadium: University of Alabama; Tuscaloosa, AL

Group I
Pos	Team	Pld	W	D	L	GF	GA	GD	SO	GFP	Pts	Qualification
1	Alabama	2	2	0	0	7	0	+7	2	7	20	Advanced to knockout stage
2	Michigan State	2	1	0	1	2	3	−1	1	2	9	Advanced to knockout stage
3	Wichita State	2	0	0	2	0	6	−7	0	0	0	Consolation

10:00am CST	Wichita State	0–4	Alabama	Field 5
Thu, November 21		Report		Stadium: University of Alabama; Tuscaloosa, AL

3:00pm CST	Michigan State	2–0	Wichita State	Field 5
Thu, November 21		Report		Stadium: University of Alabama; Tuscaloosa, AL

8:00pm CST	Alabama	3–0	Michigan State	Field 5
Thu, November 21		Report		Stadium: University of Alabama; Tuscaloosa, AL

Group J
Pos	Team	Pld	W	D	L	GF	GA	GD	SO	GFP	Pts	Qualification
1	Virginia	2	2	0	0	5	1	+4	1	5	18	Advanced to knockout stage
2	Cornell	2	1	0	1	4	2	+2	1	4	11	Advanced to knockout stage
3	Louisiana Tech	2	0	0	2	0	6	−6	0	0	0	Consolation

10:00am CST	Virginia	2–1	Cornell	Field 10
Thu, November 21		Report		Stadium: University of Alabama; Tuscaloosa, AL

3:00pm CST	Louisiana Tech	0–3	Virginia	Field 10
Thu, November 21		Report		Stadium: University of Alabama; Tuscaloosa, AL

8:00pm CST	Cornell	3–0	Louisiana Tech	Field 6
Thu, November 21		Report		Stadium: University of Alabama; Tuscaloosa, AL

Group K
Pos	Team	Pld	W	D	L	GF	GA	GD	SO	GFP	Pts	Qualification
1	Kansas	2	1	1	0	2	1	+1	1	2	12	Advanced to knockout stage
2	Georgia Southern	2	1	0	1	3	3	0	0	3	9	Advanced to knockout stage
3	Oregon	2	0	1	1	1	2	−1	1	1	5	Consolation

10:00am CST	Kansas	0–0	Oregon	Field 11
Thu, November 21		Report		Stadium: University of Alabama; Tuscaloosa, AL

3:00pm CST	Georgia Southern	1–2	Kansas	Field 11
Thu, November 21		Report		Stadium: University of Alabama; Tuscaloosa, AL

8:00pm CST	Oregon	1–2	Georgia Southern	Field 7
Thu, November 21		Report		Stadium: University of Alabama; Tuscaloosa, AL

Group L
Pos	Team	Pld	W	D	L	GF	GA	GD	SO	GFP	Pts	Qualification
1	Florida	2	2	0	0	3	1	+2	1	3	16	Advanced to knockout stage
2	Utah Valley State	2	1	0	1	4	2	+2	0	3	9	Advanced to knockout stage
3	Colorado State "Gold"	2	0	0	2	2	6	−4	0	2	2	Consolation

10:00am CST	Utah Valley State	0–1	Florida	Field 12
Thu, November 21		Report		Stadium: University of Alabama; Tuscaloosa, AL

3:00pm CST	Colorado State	1–4	Utah Valley State	Field 12
Thu, November 21		Report		Stadium: University of Alabama; Tuscaloosa, AL

8:00pm CST	Florida	2–1	Colorado State	Field 8
Thu, November 21		Report		Stadium: University of Alabama; Tuscaloosa, AL

=== Women's open ===
Group E
Pos	Team	Pld	W	D	L	GF	GA	GD	SO	GFP	Pts	Qualification
1	Colorado State "Green"	3	3	0	0	7	0	+7	3	5	26	Advanced to knockout stage
2	LSU	3	2	0	1	4	1	+3	2	4	18	Advanced to knockout stage
3	Rice	3	1	0	2	5	3	+2	1	3	10	
4	Georgia Tech	3	0	0	3	0	12	−12	0	0	0	

8:00am CST	Rice	5–0	Georgia Tech	Field 1
Thu, November 21		Report		Stadium: University of Alabama; Tuscaloosa, AL

8:00am CST	Colorado State	1–0	LSU	Field 2
Thu, November 21		Report		Stadium: University of Alabama; Tuscaloosa, AL

2:00pm CST	LSU	2–0	Rice	Field 1
Thu, November 21		Report		Stadium: University of Alabama; Tuscaloosa, AL

2:00pm CST	Georgia Tech	0–5	Colorado State	Field 2
Thu, November 21		Report		Stadium: University of Alabama; Tuscaloosa, AL

8:00am CST	Rice	0–1	Colorado State	Field 1
Fri, November 22		Report		Stadium: University of Alabama; Tuscaloosa, AL

8:00am CST	LSU	2–0	Georgia Tech	Field 2
Fri, November 22		Report		Stadium: University of Alabama; Tuscaloosa, AL

Group F
Pos	Team	Pld	W	D	L	GF	GA	GD	SO	GFP	Pts	Qualification
1	Ohio State	3	2	0	1	8	2	+6	2	6	20	Advanced to knockout stage
2	Colorado "Black"	3	2	0	1	4	2	+2	1	4	17	Advanced to knockout stage
3	Florida	3	1	0	2	4	5	−1	0	3	9	
4	Texas Tech	3	1	0	2	2	9	−7	1	2	9	

8:00am CST	Ohio State	1–2	Colorado	Field 3
Thu, November 21		Report		Stadium: University of Alabama; Tuscaloosa, AL

8:00am CST	Florida	4–1	Texas Tech	Field 4
Thu, November 21		Report		Stadium: University of Alabama; Tuscaloosa, AL

2:00pm CST	Texas Tech	0–5	Ohio State	Field 3
Thu, November 21		Report		Stadium: University of Alabama; Tuscaloosa, AL

2:00pm CST	Colorado	2–0	Florida	Field 4
Thu, November 21		Report		Stadium: University of Alabama; Tuscaloosa, AL

8:00am CST	Ohio State	2–0	Florida	Field 3
Fri, November 22		Report		Stadium: University of Alabama; Tuscaloosa, AL

8:00am CST	Texas Tech	1–0	Colorado	Field 4
Fri, November 22		Report		Stadium: University of Alabama; Tuscaloosa, AL

Group G
Pos	Team	Pld	W	D	L	GF	GA	GD	SO	GFP	Pts	Qualification
1	Princeton	3	2	1	0	7	0	+7	3	4	22	Advanced to knockout stage
2	Utah Valley State	3	2	0	1	8	1	+7	2	4	18	Advanced to knockout stage
3	Richmond	3	1	1	1	5	3	+2	1	3	13	
4	Texas	3	0	0	3	2	18	−16	0	2	2	

10:00am CST	Princeton	0–0	Richmond	Field 1
Thu, November 21		Report		Stadium: University of Alabama; Tuscaloosa, AL

10:00am CST	Texas	0–7	Utah Valley State	Field 2
Thu, November 21		Report		Stadium: University of Alabama; Tuscaloosa, AL

4:00pm CST	Utah Valley State	0–1	Princeton	Field 1
Thu, November 21		Report		Stadium: University of Alabama; Tuscaloosa, AL

4:00pm CST	Richmond	5–2	Texas	Field 2
Thu, November 21		Report		Stadium: University of Alabama; Tuscaloosa, AL

8:00am CST	Princeton	6–0	Texas	Field 5
Fri, November 22		Report		Stadium: University of Alabama; Tuscaloosa, AL

8:00am CST	Utah Valley State	1–0	Richmond	Field 6
Fri, November 22		Report		Stadium: University of Alabama; Tuscaloosa, AL

Group H
Pos	Team	Pld	W	D	L	GF	GA	GD	SO	GFP	Pts	Qualification
1	Virginia	3	3	0	0	7	1	+6	2	6	26	Advanced to knockout stage
2	Kansas	3	2	0	1	6	1	+5	2	4	18	Advanced to knockout stage
3	Georgia Southern	3	1	0	2	2	7	−5	1	2	9	
4	Colorado Mines	3	0	0	3	0	6	−6	0	0	0	

12:00pm CST	Virginia	2–1	Georgia Southern	Field 6
Thu, November 21		Report		Stadium: University of Alabama; Tuscaloosa, AL

12:00pm CST	Colorado Mines	0–1	Kansas	Field 7
Thu, November 21		Report		Stadium: University of Alabama; Tuscaloosa, AL

6:00pm CST	Kansas	0–1	Virginia	Field 5
Thu, November 21		Report		Stadium: University of Alabama; Tuscaloosa, AL

6:00pm CST	Georgia Southern	1–0	Colorado Mines	Field 6
Thu, November 21		Report		Stadium: University of Alabama; Tuscaloosa, AL

8:00am CST	Virginia	4–0	Colorado Mines	Field 7
Fri, November 22		Report		Stadium: University of Alabama; Tuscaloosa, AL

8:00am CST	Kansas	5–0	Georgia Southern	Field 8
Fri, November 22		Report		Stadium: University of Alabama; Tuscaloosa, AL

== Tournament bracket ==
=== Men's championship ===
Quarterfinals
Fri • 4:00pm • Field 5
Illinois	4
North Carolina	3
Fri • 4:00pm • Field 6
Michigan State (pen.)	2
Texas A&M	1
Fri • 4:00pm • Field 7
BYU	7
Mississippi State	1
Fri • 4:00pm • Field 8
Penn State	6
Miami (OH)	1

Semifinals
Sat • 10:00am • Field 7
Illinois (a.e.t.)	1
Michigan	0
Sat • 10:00am • Field 8
BYU	4
Penn State	1

Final
Sat • 5:00pm • Field 9
Illinois	0
BYU	4

=== Women's championship ===
Quarterfinals
Fri • 6:00pm • Field 1
Michigan (a.e.t.)	1
Delaware	0
Fri • 6:00pm • Field 2
Colorado	3
Penn State (pen.)	4
Fri • 6:00pm • Field 3
UC-Santa Barbara	1
Michigan State	0
Fri • 6:00pm • Field 4
Arizona (pen.)	4
Colorado State	3

Semifinals
Sat • 10:00am • Field 5
Michigan	2
Penn State	3
Sat • 10:00am • Field 6
UC-Santa Barbara (pen.)	2
Arizona	1

Final
Sat • 3:00pm • Field 9
Penn State	1
UC-Santa Barbara	0

=== Men's open ===
Sweet 16
Fri • 8:00am • Field 9
Rice	1
Utah Valley	4
Fri • 8:00am • Field 10
Texas Tech	7
Georgia Southern	0
Fri • 8:00am • Field 11
JMU	3
Cornell	0
Fri • 8:00am • Field 12
SIU	2
Michigan State	3
Fri • 10:00am • Field 9
Alabama	0
Arizona	2
Fri • 10:00am • Field 10
Virginia	1
Grand Valley	0
Fri • 10:00am • Field 11
Kansas	1
Georgia Tech	0
Fri • 10:00am • Field 12
Florida	1
Ohio State	7

Quarterfinals
Fri • 2:00pm • Field 5
Utah Valley	1
Texas Tech	2
Fri • 2:00pm • Field 6
JMU (pen.)	2
Michigan State	1
Fri • 4:00pm • Field 3
Arizona	4
Virginia	1
Fri • 4:00pm • Field 4
Kansas	1
Ohio State	2

Semifinals
Sat • 8:00am • Field 3
Texas Tech	3
JMU	0
Sat • 8:00am • Field 4
Arizona	1
Ohio State	4

Final
Sat • 1:00pm • Field 2
Texas Tech	2
Ohio State	3

==== Men's open consolation ====
Quarterfinals
Fri • 12:00pm • Field 9
MTSU	6
Wichita State	3
Fri • 12:00pm • Field 10
UL-Lafayette	3
Oregon	2
Fri • 12:00pm • Field 11
Florida State	3
Colorado State	1
Fri • 12:00pm • Field 12
Louisiana Tech	1
Northern Arizona	4

Semifinals
Fri • 6:00pm • Field 5
MTSU	3
UL-Lafayette (pen.)	4
Fri • 6:00pm • Field 6
Florida State	1
Northern Arizona (a.e.t.)	2

Final
Sat • 10:00am • Field 4
UL-Lafayette	1
Northern Arizona	0

=== Women's open ===
Quarterfinals
Fri • 2:00pm • Field 1
Colorado State	1
Colorado	4
Fri • 2:00pm • Field 2
Virginia	1
Utah Valley	0
Fri • 2:00pm • Field 3
Ohio State	2
Kansas	0
Fri • 2:00pm • Field 4
Princeton	1
LSU	0

Semifinals
Sat • 8:00am • Field 1
Colorado	2
Virginia	0
Sat • 8:00am • Field 2
Ohio State	1
Princeton	0

Final
Sat • 1:00pm • Field 1
Colorado (a.e.t.)	2
Ohio State	1

== All-tournament teams ==
=== Men's championship ===
Num	Name	Team
GK	John Morris (Note: Most Valuable Player)	BYU
4	Casey Waldron	BYU
5	Brandon Leroy	BYU
3	Ryan Stotts	Illinois
11	Jeff Connell	Illinois
2	Tony Albrecht	Miami (OH)
9	Tom Skilling	Michigan
11	Patrick Stone	Mississippi State
25	Adam Miller	North Carolina
13	Esli Feliz	Penn State
17	Gareth Glick	Texas A&M
GK	Wally Musumeci	Illinois
Outstanding sportsmanship
Navy

=== Women's championship ===
Num	Name	Team
MVP	Marcia Haradon	Penn State
16	Ryan Zwelling	Colorado
21	Laura Eicham	Delaware
11	Kerry Greer	Colorado State
12	Sinead Byrne	Michigan State
10	Lisa Mireles	Arizona
7	Melissa Persaud	Penn State
10	Gwen Reyes	Michigan
3	Vida Tafoya	UC-Santa Barbara
15	Ashley Carter	Michigan
18	Amber Squire	UC-Santa Barbara
GK	Sara Kloosterman	Michigan State
Outstanding sportsmanship
Delaware

=== Men's open ===
Name	Team
Ian Gordona	Ohio State
Michael Chandler	Texas Tech
Ryan Miller	Utah Valley State
Patrick Noonan	Arizona
Gifford Okatah-Boi	Virginia
Doug Paul	Ohio State
Sean Washatka	Kansas
Ryan Byrd	Michigan State
Chris Hogan	JMU
Ivan Lerma	Arizona
Chris Moreno	Texas Tech
Wayne Pientka	Ohio State

=== Women's open ===
	Name	Team
MVP	Jessie Chrismer	Colorado "Black"
11	Katie Ojennes	Colorado State "Green"
3	Linda Crites	Princeton
16	Erin Wilcox	Virginia
5	Kristin Harris	Colorado "Black"
18	Cindy Heiss	Colorado "Black"
28	Jennifer Dues	Ohio State
5	Carrie Forster	Kansas
10	Christen Severson	LSU
5	Debbie Ropp	Utah Valley State
15	Holly Reilman	Ohio State
GK	Jana Jordine	Colorado "Black"
