= Calvano =

Calvano is an Italian surname. Notable people with the surname include:

- Anthony Calvano (born 1982), American soccer player
- Sadie Calvano (born 1997), American actress
- Simone Calvano (born 1993), Italian footballer
- Tiago Calvano (born 1981), Brazilian footballer

Fictional characters

- Jodie Calvano, fictional character the soap opera River City
