= Anthony Calvano =

American soccer player (born 1982)

Personal information
- Full name: Anthony Calvano
- Date of birth: January 8, 1982 (age 44)
- Place of birth: Garden Grove, California, United States
- Height: 5 ft 7 in (1.70 m)
- Position: Defender

Youth career
- 2002–2004: Penn State Nittany Lions

Senior career*
Years	Team	Apps	(Gls)
2005–2006	Pittsburgh Riverhounds	26	(1)
2007–2011	Harrisburg City Islanders	87	(3)
2012	Pittsburgh Riverhounds	17	(0)
- * Club domestic league appearances and goals as of July 21, 2012

Anthony Calvano (born January 8, 1982) is an American soccer player.

== Career ==
=== College ===
Calvano was cut by the varsity soccer team at Pennsylvania State University his freshman year, he played for the Pennsylvania State University men's club soccer team that season, helping guide the Penn State club team to an undefeated record of 25-0-5 and winning the 2000 NIRSA National Soccer Championship with a 2–0 victory over Texas Tech. Calvano was cut again his sophomore year, he again played for the Penn State men's club team, the team's unbeaten streak reached 54 matches before falling to BYU 4–1 in the semifinals of the 2001 NIRSA National Soccer Championship. Calvano finally made the varsity college soccer team at Pennsylvania State University in 2002, his junior year, he appeared in 20 of 24 matches that season, starting 9 of them, and helped the team win the Big Ten tournament for the first time since 1993. Over the next two years Calvano played as a defender and started in all 42 games for Penn State during his final two years of NCAA eligibility, registering 2 goals and 4 assists, this after not playing a single minute on the varsity team as a freshman or sophomore.

=== Professional ===
Calvano turned professional when he signed with Pittsburgh Riverhounds of the USL Second Division in 2005 and made his professional debut on April 23, 2005, in Pittsburgh's 1–0 opening day defeat to the Harrisburg City Islanders.

He transferred to the Harrisburg City Islanders in 2007, and played every single minute of Harrisburg's 2007 championship season. On February 2, 2010, Harrisburg City announced the re-signing of Calvano for the 2010 season.
