= 2000 NIRSA National Soccer Championship =

- League: NIRSA
- Sport: Soccer
- Site: University of Texas; Austin, Texas
- Duration: November 16–18, 2000
- Teams: 16 (men's championship); 16 (women's championship); 16 (men's open); 15 (women's open)
- Results: Official Results

Men's Championship Division
- Score: 2–0
- Champion: Penn State (1st title, 1st title game)
- Runners-up: Texas Tech (3rd title game)
- Season MVP: Reed Brubaker (Penn State)

Women's Championship Division
- Score: 1–0 (a.e.t.)
- Champion: Michigan (1st title, 2nd title game)
- Runners-up: Ohio State (1st title game)
- Season MVP: Laura Rowland (Michigan)

Men's Open Division
- Score: 2–0
- Champion: JMU (2nd title, 2nd title game)
- Runners-up: Oregon (1st title game)
- Season MVP: Sean Mannion (JMU)

Women's Open Division
- Score: 1–0
- Champion: Virginia (1st title, 1st title game)
- Runners-up: Rice (2nd title game)
- Top seed: Melissa Hancock (Virginia)

NIRSA national soccer championships seasons
- ← 1999 2001 →

The 2000 NIRSA national soccer championship was the 7th NIRSA National Soccer Championships, the annual national championships for United States-based, collegiate club soccer teams organized by NIRSA. It took place at The University of Texas in Austin, Texas from Thursday, November 16 to Saturday, November 18, 2000.

== Overview ==
=== Men's championship ===
In the finals, back-to-back runners up, Texas Tech, would face region 1 champions, Penn State, following their historic win over BYU in the semifinals. Prior to this, in the group stage, both teams would top their group. Texas Tech would tie their opener to Cornell 2–2, then would defeat Virginia Tech 4–0, and finally would beat Utah 2–1. Meanwhile, Penn State defeated Colorado State 4–0 with opening goals from Darin Tranquillo and Ken Lear, then tied Arizona 1–1 where Lear scored Penn State's lone goal, and finally defeated region III tournament champions Illinois 3–2 including a late winner from Lear. In the quarterfinals, Penn State would defeat Utah 3–0 with 2 goals from Ken Lear while Texas Tech would score a golden goal in overtime to defeat region III tournament runners-up, Ohio University, following a 1–1 draw in regulation.

In the semifinals, on what was described as a "cold, wet" day in Austin, Texas Tech would face regional champions Illinois. In the game, Illinois would score the first two goals but Texas Tech would cut their deficit in half following a late first half goal. Texas Tech would score again in the second half, leveling the score at 2–2 which would remain after regulation. Following a scoreless overtime, penalties would be required to determine a winner. In penalties, Illinois would miss all of their shootout attempts and two makes from Texas Tech would be enough to reach their third consecutive finals. Meanwhile, Penn State would face four-time reigning champion BYU. Darin Tranquillo of Penn State would open the scoring early but BYU's Daniel Yescas would score on a penalty kick before halftime to leave the score 1–1. About halfway into the second half, BYU's Bryce Jolley would score to give BYU the lead, but Penn State's Ken Lear would score shortly after to tie the game at 2–2. The game would remain tied at the end of regulation, and with no goals in overtime a penalty shootout would be required to determine a winner. In the shootout, where Penn State shot first, both teams had scored twice and missed once after 3 rounds of kicks; but, following a make from Lear and a save from eventual tournament MVP Reed Brubaker, Penn State were a make or a BYU miss away from their first finals appearance. A make from team captain Chad Meldrum of Penn State would be enough to not only advance to their first finals, but also give BYU their first loss in their 5 years in the tournament. This win also snapped BYU's 4-straight title run and ended the longest national championship win streak of 28 games dating back to their first game in the competition in 1996.

In the finals, Ken Leary of Penn State would score just before halftime in his sixth straight game of the tournament to give Penn State a 1–0 lead. The score would remain the same until the dying moments of the match when Leary would notch his 8th goal of the tournament and seal Penn State's first ever title while Texas Tech would lose their third straight finals. Goalkeeper Reed Brubaker of Penn State would go on to be named tournament MVP.

=== Women's championship ===
In the finals, reigning runners up, Michigan, would face regional opponent and rival, Ohio State. Prior to this, in the group stage, both teams would lose their opener with Ohio State losing to Delaware 1–2 and Michigan losing their first match of the season 2–3 to UC-Santa Barbara. Following this, Ohio State would beat Northern Colorado 2–0 then beat eventual group winners, Virginia Tech, 1–0 in the finale while Michigan beat Florida State1-0 then tied Utah Valley State to 1–1 to advance to the knockout round.

In the quarterfinals, both teams would require penalties following a 1–1 draw after regulation and overtime with Ohio State defeating Delaware and Michigan defeating two-time champion Colorado. In the semifinals, Michigan would defeat Virginia Tech 1–0 to advance to their second consecutive finals while Ohio State defeated two-time runner up, Penn State, 1–0 to advance to their first finals. In the finals, the game would be deadlocked 0–0 after regulation and the first period of overtime. With two minutes before the game would go into a penalty shootout, freshman midfielder Jamie Chioini of Michigan would score the first goal of the match, on what was a golden goal, from an assist from sophomore Anna Haghgooie to help Michigan claim their first national title. Michigan's Laura Rowland would be named tournament MVP.

=== Men's open ===
In the finals, reigning champions, JMU, would face finals debutants Oregon. Prior to this, in the group stage, JMU would win their first two games defeating Grand Valley State 4–0 and Houston 6–0, then would tie Utah Valley State 1–1 to win their group. Meanwhile, Oregon would win their opener against MTSU 6–0, then would lose to Rice 1–0 on a goal from Rice's Tony Licata in their second match, and finally would beat Weber "B" 1–0 to advance to the quarterfinals.

In the knockout round, JMU would beat inaugural open champions and hosts, Texas "B", 1–0 in the quarterfinals then would beat Weber State's "B" 2–1 in the semifinals to advance to their second consecutive finals. Meanwhile, in the quarterfinals, following a 2–2 draw in regulation and a scoreless first overtime period, sophomore Michael Kubas of Oregon would score a golden goal in the second overtime period to advance to the semifinals where they would defeat Howard 3–1 and make their first finals. In the finals, JMU would win 2–0 to claim their second straight open title, the first team to win two open titles. JMU senior and club president, Sean Mannion, who scored 6 goals in the competition would be named MVP for the second consecutive year.

=== Women's open ===
In the finals, 1996 open runners up, Rice, would face finals debutants Virginia. Prior to this, in the group stage, Virginia would be placed in the only group of 3 teams and would beat the other two teams in the group, first 1996 open champion, Texas, 3–0 then 1998 champions, Colorado State "Green", 5–1. Meanwhile, Rice would beat LSU 3–0 in the opener, then lost to JMU 0–3, and finally beat 1995 open runners-up Kansas 1–0 to advance to the knockout round.

In the quarterfinals, both teams would win 3–0 with Virginia beating Ohio University and Rice beating rival Texas A&M. In the semifinals, Virginia would beat JMU 2–1 while Rice would be tied with Colorado State "Green" 1–1 at the end of regulation. In overtime, Rice would score a golden goal to advance to the finals. In the finals, Virginia would score the lone goal of the game with 20 minutes remaining in the match to win their first open title. Virginia's Melissa Hancock would be named tournament MVP.

== Format ==
The competition consisted of 63 teams partitioned into 32 men's teams and 31 women's teams. Each of these partitions were further divided into an invite-only championship division and an open division. The divisions were divided into four groups of four teams each except for the women's open division group E which only had 3 teams. All 4 divisions began with a round-robin tournament where teams played each of the other teams in their group once. Following this, the two best teams in each group advanced to a single-elimination, knockout round. The first metric for determining the best team was points, calculated first by giving a team 6 points for a win, 3 points for a tie, and 0 points for a loss. Then, a team could be awarded an addition point for a shutout and an additional point for every goal scored, up to a max of 3 goals per game. If teams were tied on points, the following criteria were used in order:

1. Winner of head-to-head competition
2. Greatest goal difference
3. Most goals scored
4. Coin toss

The knockout stage was an 8-team tournament composed of the two best teams in each group. Knockout stage games needed to declare a winner, so if one was tied at the end of regulation, overtime would begin. Overtime in the quarterfinals consisted of two, 5-minute, golden-goal periods while in the semifinals and finals, overtime consisted of two, 10-minute, golden-goal periods. If still tied after overtime, kicks from the mark would determine the winner. Pool play and quarterfinal games were two 40-minute halves, separated by a seven-minute halftime with the semifinals and finals also being 40-minute halves, but having a ten-minute halftime. If a player received three yellow cards during the course of the tournament they would be suspended the following game.

== Qualification and selections ==
=== Men's championship ===
Participating teams
| Region | Team | Appearance | Last Bid |
|---|---|---|---|
| I | Penn State | 4th | 1999 |
| I | Navy | 2nd | 1999 |
| I | Cornell | 1st | Never |
| II | Virginia Tech | 2nd | 1999 |
| II | Alabama | 1st | Never |
| II | Georgia Tech | 1st | Never |
| III | Illinois | 2nd | 1998 |
| III | Ohio | 1st | Never |
| IV | Texas Tech | 4th | 1999 |
| IV | Kansas | 2nd | 1996 |
| V | Colorado | 4th | 1999 |
| V | Colorado State | 4th | 1999 |
| VI | BYU | 5th | 1999 |
| VI | Arizona | 2nd | 1999 |
| VI | Weber State | 2nd | 1999 |
| VI | Utah | 1st | Never |

=== Women's championship ===
Participating teams
| Region | Team | Appearance | Last Bid |
|---|---|---|---|
| I | Penn State | 6th | 1999 |
| I | Delaware | 2nd | 1999 |
| II | Virginia Tech | 3rd | 1999 |
| II | Florida | 2nd | 1994 |
| II | Florida State | 1st | Never |
| III | Miami (OH) | 7th | 1999 |
| III | Ohio State | 6th | 1999 |
| III | Michigan | 2nd | 1999 |
| III | Indiana | 1st | Never |
| IV | Baylor | 2nd | 1995 |
| IV | Texas State | 1st | Never |
| V | Colorado | 6th | 1999 |
| V | Colorado State | 4th | 1999 |
| V | Northern Colorado | 1st | Never |
| VI | UC-Santa Barbara | 1st | Never |
| VI | Utah Valley State | 1st | Never |

=== Men's open ===
| Region | Num | Team |
|---|---|---|
| I | 1 | Howard |
| II | 4 | Florida, JMU, MTSU, Virginia |
| III | 1 | Grand Valley State |
| IV | 5 | UL-Lafayette, Houston, Rice, Texas "B", Wichita State |
| V | 2 | Colorado State "Gold", St. Thomas |
| VI | 3 | Oregon, Utah Valley State, Weber State "B" |

=== Women's open ===
| Region | Num | Team |
|---|---|---|
| I | 0 | – |
| II | 4 | Georgia Tech, JMU, Miami (FL), Virginia |
| III | 1 | Ohio |
| IV | 6 | Kansas, LSU, Rice, Southwest Texas State, Texas, Texas A&M |
| V | 2 | Colorado State "Green", Colorado "Black" |
| VI | 2 | Arizona, San Diego State |

== Group stage ==
=== Men's championship ===
Group A
| Pos | Team | Pld | W | D | L | GF | GA | GD | SO (Note: Shutouts) | GFP (Note: Goals for, points. The points gained by scoring with a max of 3 per game) | Pts | Qualification |
|---|---|---|---|---|---|---|---|---|---|---|---|---|
| 1 | BYU | 3 | 3 | 0 | 0 | 10 | 3 | +7 | 0 | 8 | 26 | Advanced to knockout stage |
| 2 | Ohio | 3 | 2 | 0 | 1 | 4 | 4 | 0 | 2 | 4 | 18 | Advanced to knockout stage |
| 3 | Navy | 3 | 1 | 0 | 2 | 2 | 4 | −2 | 1 | 2 | 9 | |
| 4 | Alabama | 3 | 0 | 0 | 3 | 1 | 6 | −5 | 0 | 1 | 1 | |

Scores

| 8:00am CST | BYU | 2–1 | Navy | Field 3 |
| Thu, November 16 | | Report | | Stadium: University of Texas; Austin, Texas |

| 8:00am CST | Alabama | 0–1 | Ohio | Field 4 |
| Thu, November 16 | | Report | | Stadium: University of Texas; Austin, Texas |

| 2:00pm CST | Ohio | 1–4 | BYU | Field 3 |
| Thu, November 16 | | Report | | Stadium: University of Texas; Austin, Texas |

| 2:00pm CST | Navy | 1–0 | Alabama | Field 4 |
| Thu, November 16 | | Report | | Stadium: University of Texas; Austin, Texas |

| 8:00am CST | BYU | 4–1 | Alabama | Field 3 |
| Fri, November 17 | | Report | | Stadium: University of Texas; Austin, Texas |

| 8:00am CST | Ohio | 2–0 | Navy | Field 4 |
| Fri, November 17 | | Report | | Stadium: University of Texas; Austin, Texas |

Group B
| Pos | Team | Pld | W | D | L | GF | GA | GD | SO | GFP | Pts | Qualification |
|---|---|---|---|---|---|---|---|---|---|---|---|---|
| 1 | Colorado | 3 | 2 | 1 | 0 | 10 | 5 | +5 | 0 | 8 | 23 | Advanced to knockout stage |
| 2 | Weber State | 3 | 1 | 2 | 0 | 4 | 3 | +1 | 1 | 4 | 17 | Advanced to knockout stage |
| 3 | Kansas | 3 | 1 | 1 | 1 | 5 | 7 | −2 | 0 | 5 | 14 | |
| 4 | Georgia Tech | 3 | 0 | 0 | 3 | 2 | 6 | −4 | 0 | 2 | 2 | |

Scores

| 12:00pm CST | Weber State | 1–1 | Kansas | Field 3 |
| Thu, November 16 | | Report | | Stadium: University of Texas; Austin, Texas |

| 12:00pm CST | Colorado | 3–1 | Georgia Tech | Field 4 |
| Thu, November 16 | | Report | | Stadium: University of Texas; Austin, Texas |

| 6:00pm CST | Georgia Tech | 0–1 | Weber State | Field 3 |
| Thu, November 16 | | Report | | Stadium: University of Texas; Austin, Texas |

| 6:00pm CST | Kansas | 2–5 | Colorado | Field 4 |
| Thu, November 16 | | Report | | Stadium: University of Texas; Austin, Texas |

| 8:00am CST | Weber State | 2–2 | Colorado | Field 5 |
| Fri, November 17 | | Report | | Stadium: University of Texas; Austin, Texas |

| 8:00am CST | Georgia Tech | 1–2 | Kansas | Field 6 |
| Fri, November 17 | | Report | | Stadium: University of Texas; Austin, Texas |

Group C
| Pos | Team | Pld | W | D | L | GF | GA | GD | SO | GFP | Pts | Qualification |
|---|---|---|---|---|---|---|---|---|---|---|---|---|
| 1 | Texas Tech | 3 | 2 | 1 | 0 | 8 | 3 | +5 | 1 | 7 | 23 | Advanced to knockout stage |
| 2 | Utah | 3 | 1 | 1 | 1 | 3 | 2 | +1 | 2 | 3 | 14 | Advanced to knockout stage |
| 3 | Cornell | 3 | 1 | 1 | 1 | 5 | 5 | 0 | 0 | 5 | 14 | |
| 4 | Virginia Tech | 3 | 0 | 1 | 2 | 1 | 7 | −6 | 1 | 1 | 5 | |

Scores

| 10:00am CST | Utah | 0–0 | Virginia Tech | Field 3 |
| Thu, November 16 | | Report | | Stadium: University of Texas; Austin, Texas |

| 10:00am CST | Texas Tech | 2–2 | Cornell | Field 4 |
| Thu, November 16 | | Report | | Stadium: University of Texas; Austin, Texas |

| 4:00pm CST | Cornell | 0–2 | Utah | Field 3 |
| Thu, November 16 | | Report | | Stadium: University of Texas; Austin, Texas |

| 4:00pm CST | Virginia Tech | 0–4 | Texas Tech | Field 4 |
| Thu, November 16 | | Report | | Stadium: University of Texas; Austin, Texas |

| 8:00am CST | Utah | 1–2 | Texas Tech | Field 7 |
| Fri, November 17 | | Report | | Stadium: University of Texas; Austin, Texas |

| 8:00am CST | Cornell | 3–1 | Virginia Tech | Field 6 |
| Fri, November 17 | | Report | | Stadium: University of Texas; Austin, Texas |

Group D
| Pos | Team | Pld | W | D | L | GF | GA | GD | SO | GFP | Pts | Qualification |
|---|---|---|---|---|---|---|---|---|---|---|---|---|
| 1 | Penn State | 3 | 2 | 1 | 0 | 8 | 3 | +5 | 1 | 7 | 23 | Advanced to knockout stage |
| 2 | Illinois | 3 | 1 | 1 | 1 | 7 | 6 | +1 | 0 | 7 | 16 | Advanced to knockout stage |
| 3 | Arizona | 3 | 1 | 1 | 1 | 5 | 5 | 0 | 0 | 5 | 14 | |
| 4 | Colorado State | 3 | 0 | 1 | 2 | 3 | 9 | −6 | 0 | 3 | 6 | |

Scores

| 12:00pm CST | Arizona | 1–3 | Illinois | Field 7 |
| Thu, November 16 | | Report | | Stadium: University of Texas; Austin, Texas |

| 12:00pm CST | Colorado State | 0–4 | Penn State | Field 8 |
| Thu, November 16 | | Report | | Stadium: University of Texas; Austin, Texas |

| 6:00pm CST | Penn State | 1–1 | Arizona | Field 7 |
| Thu, November 16 | | Report | | Stadium: University of Texas; Austin, Texas |

| 6:00pm CST | Illinois | 2–2 | Colorado State | Field 8 |
| Thu, November 16 | | Report | | Stadium: University of Texas; Austin, Texas |

| 10:00am CST | Arizona | 3–1 | Colorado State | Field 7 |
| Fri, November 17 | | Report | | Stadium: University of Texas; Austin, Texas |

| 10:00am CST | Penn State | 3–2 | Illinois | Field 8 |
| Fri, November 17 | | Report | | Stadium: University of Texas; Austin, Texas |

=== Women's championship ===
Group A
| Pos | Team | Pld | W | D | L | GF | GA | GD | SO | GFP | Pts | Qualification |
|---|---|---|---|---|---|---|---|---|---|---|---|---|
| 1 | Colorado | 3 | 2 | 1 | 0 | 6 | 1 | +5 | 2 | 6 | 23 | Advanced to knockout stage |
| 2 | Penn State | 3 | 1 | 1 | 1 | 4 | 3 | +1 | 1 | 4 | 14 | Advanced to knockout stage |
| 3 | Texas Tech | 3 | 1 | 1 | 1 | 4 | 5 | −1 | 0 | 4 | 13 | |
| 4 | Indiana | 3 | 0 | 1 | 2 | 2 | 7 | −5 | 0 | 2 | 5 | |

Scores

| 8:00am CST | Penn State | 1–2 | Texas Tech | Field 5 |
| Thu, November 16 | | Report | | Stadium: University of Texas; Austin, Texas |

| 8:00am CST | Colorado | 3–0 | Indiana | Field 6 |
| Thu, November 16 | | Report | | Stadium: University of Texas; Austin, Texas |

| 2:00pm CST | Indiana | 0–2 | Penn State | Field 5 |
| Thu, November 16 | | Report | | Stadium: University of Texas; Austin, Texas |

| 2:00pm CST | Texas Tech | 0–2 | Colorado | Field 6 |
| Thu, November 16 | | Report | | Stadium: University of Texas; Austin, Texas |

| 12:00pm CST | Penn State | 1–1 | Colorado | Field 3 |
| Fri, November 17 | | Report | | Stadium: University of Texas; Austin, Texas |

| 12:00pm CST | Indiana | 2–2 | Texas Tech | Field 4 |
| Fri, November 17 | | Report | | Stadium: University of Texas; Austin, Texas |

Group B
| Pos | Team | Pld | W | D | L | GF | GA | GD | SO | GFP | Pts | Qualification |
|---|---|---|---|---|---|---|---|---|---|---|---|---|
| 1 | Delaware | 3 | 3 | 0 | 0 | 9 | 3 | +6 | 1 | 9 | 28 | Advanced to knockout stage |
| 2 | Michigan | 3 | 1 | 1 | 1 | 4 | 4 | 0 | 1 | 4 | 13 | Advanced to knockout stage |
| 3 | Utah Valley State | 3 | 1 | 1 | 1 | 4 | 5 | −1 | 0 | 4 | 12 | |
| 4 | Florida State | 3 | 0 | 0 | 3 | 1 | 6 | −5 | 0 | 1 | 1 | |

Scores

| 12:00pm CST | Michigan | 2–3 | Delaware | Field 5 |
| Thu, November 16 | | Report | | Stadium: University of Texas; Austin, Texas |

| 12:00pm CST | Utah Valley State | 2–1 | Florida State | Field 6 |
| Thu, November 16 | | Report | | Stadium: University of Texas; Austin, Texas |

| 6:00pm CST | Florida State | 0–1 | Michigan | Field 5 |
| Thu, November 16 | | Report | | Stadium: University of Texas; Austin, Texas |

| 6:00pm CST | Delaware | 3–1 | Utah Valley State | Field 6 |
| Thu, November 16 | | Report | | Stadium: University of Texas; Austin, Texas |

| 12:00pm CST | Michigan | 1–1 | Utah Valley State | Field 7 |
| Fri, November 17 | | Report | | Stadium: University of Texas; Austin, Texas |

| 12:00pm CST | Florida State | 0–3 | Delaware | Field 8 |
| Fri, November 17 | | Report | | Stadium: University of Texas; Austin, Texas |

Group C
| Pos | Team | Pld | W | D | L | GF | GA | GD | SO | GFP | Pts | Qualification |
|---|---|---|---|---|---|---|---|---|---|---|---|---|
| 1 | Colorado State | 3 | 3 | 0 | 0 | 9 | 2 | +7 | 1 | 7 | 26 | Advanced to knockout stage |
| 2 | Miami (OH) | 3 | 2 | 0 | 1 | 6 | 2 | +4 | 1 | 5 | 18 | Advanced to knockout stage |
| 3 | Florida | 3 | 1 | 0 | 2 | 4 | 7 | −3 | 0 | 4 | 10 | |
| 4 | Baylor | 3 | 0 | 0 | 3 | 3 | 11 | −8 | 0 | 3 | 3 | |

Scores

| 10:00am CST | Colorado State | 4–1 | Baylor | Field 7 |
| Thu, November 16 | | Report | | Stadium: University of Texas; Austin, Texas |

| 10:00am CST | Miami (OH) | 2–0 | Florida | Field 8 |
| Thu, November 16 | | Report | | Stadium: University of Texas; Austin, Texas |

| 4:00pm CST | Florida | 1–4 | Colorado State | Field 5 |
| Thu, November 16 | | Report | | Stadium: University of Texas; Austin, Texas |

| 4:00pm CST | Baylor | 1–4 | Miami (OH) | Field 6 |
| Thu, November 16 | | Report | | Stadium: University of Texas; Austin, Texas |

| 12:00pm CST | Colorado State | 1–0 | Miami (OH) | Field 9 |
| Fri, November 17 | | Report | | Stadium: University of Texas; Austin, Texas |

| 12:00pm CST | Florida | 3–1 | Baylor | Field 10 |
| Fri, November 17 | | Report | | Stadium: University of Texas; Austin, Texas |

Group D
| Pos | Team | Pld | W | D | L | GF | GA | GD | SO | GFP | Pts | Qualification |
|---|---|---|---|---|---|---|---|---|---|---|---|---|
| 1 | Virginia Tech | 3 | 2 | 0 | 1 | 5 | 3 | +2 | 1 | 5 | 18 | Advanced to knockout stage |
| 2 | Ohio State | 3 | 2 | 0 | 1 | 4 | 2 | +2 | 2 | 4 | 18 | Advanced to knockout stage |
| 3 | UC-Santa Barbara | 3 | 2 | 0 | 1 | 3 | 3 | 0 | 1 | 3 | 16 | |
| 4 | Northern Colorado | 3 | 0 | 0 | 3 | 2 | 6 | −4 | 0 | 2 | 2 | |

Scores

| 10:00am CST | Virginia Tech | 3–2 | Northern Colorado | Field 5 |
| Thu, November 16 | | Report | | Stadium: University of Texas; Austin, Texas |

| 10:00am CST | Ohio State | 1–2 | UC-Santa Barbara | Field 6 |
| Thu, November 16 | | Report | | Stadium: University of Texas; Austin, Texas |

| 4:00pm CST | UC-Santa Barbara | 0–2 | Virginia Tech | Field 7 |
| Thu, November 16 | | Report | | Stadium: University of Texas; Austin, Texas |

| 4:00pm CST | Northern Colorado | 0–2 | Ohio State | Field 8 |
| Thu, November 16 | | Report | | Stadium: University of Texas; Austin, Texas |

| 2:00pm CST | Virginia Tech | 0–1 | Ohio State | Field 5 |
| Fri, November 17 | | Report | | Stadium: University of Texas; Austin, Texas |

| 2:00pm CST | UC-Santa Barbara | 1–0 | Northern Colorado | Field 4 |
| Fri, November 17 | | Report | | Stadium: University of Texas; Austin, Texas |

=== Men's open ===
Group E
| Pos | Team | Pld | W | D | L | GF | GA | GD | SO | GFP | Pts | Qualification |
|---|---|---|---|---|---|---|---|---|---|---|---|---|
| 1 | Howard | 3 | 2 | 1 | 0 | 10 | 2 | +8 | 2 | 7 | 24 | Advanced to knockout stage |
| 2 | Florida | 3 | 2 | 0 | 1 | 8 | 3 | +5 | 1 | 6 | 19 | Advanced to knockout stage |
| 3 | Wichita State | 3 | 1 | 1 | 1 | 9 | 6 | +3 | 0 | 6 | 15 | |
| 4 | St. Thomas | 3 | 0 | 0 | 3 | 1 | 17 | −16 | 0 | 1 | 1 | |

Scores

| 8:00am CST | Florida | 5–0 | St. Thomas | Field 9 |
| Thu, November 16 | | Report | | Stadium: University of Texas; Austin, Texas |

| 8:00am CST | Wichita State | 2–2 | Howard | Field 10 |
| Thu, November 16 | | Report | | Stadium: University of Texas; Austin, Texas |

| 2:00pm CST | Howard | 2–0 | Florida | Field 9 |
| Thu, November 16 | | Report | | Stadium: University of Texas; Austin, Texas |

| 2:00pm CST | St. Thomas | 1–6 | Wichita State | Field 10 |
| Thu, November 16 | | Report | | Stadium: University of Texas; Austin, Texas |

| 10:00am CST | Florida | 3–1 | Wichita State | Field 3 |
| Fri, November 17 | | Report | | Stadium: University of Texas; Austin, Texas |

| 10:00am CST | Howard | 6–0 | St. Thomas | Field 4 |
| Fri, November 17 | | Report | | Stadium: University of Texas; Austin, Texas |

Group F
| Pos | Team | Pld | W | D | L | GF | GA | GD | SO | GFP | Pts | Qualification |
|---|---|---|---|---|---|---|---|---|---|---|---|---|
| 1 | JMU | 3 | 2 | 1 | 0 | 11 | 1 | +10 | 2 | 7 | 24 | Advanced to knockout stage |
| 2 | Utah Valley State | 3 | 1 | 2 | 0 | 7 | 4 | +3 | 0 | 5 | 17 | Advanced to knockout stage |
| 3 | Grand Valley State | 3 | 1 | 0 | 2 | 6 | 12 | −6 | 0 | 5 | 11 | |
| 4 | Houston | 3 | 0 | 1 | 2 | 4 | 11 | −7 | 0 | 4 | 7 | |

Scores

| 10:00am CST | Utah Valley | 1–1 | Houston | Field 9 |
| Thu, November 16 | | Report | | Stadium: University of Texas; Austin, Texas |

| 10:00am CST | JMU | 4–0 | Grand Valley | Field 10 |
| Thu, November 16 | | Report | | Stadium: University of Texas; Austin, Texas |

| 4:00pm CST | Grand Valley | 2–5 | Utah Valley | Field 9 |
| Thu, November 16 | | Report | | Stadium: University of Texas; Austin, Texas |

| 4:00pm CST | Houston | 0–6 | JMU | Field 10 |
| Thu, November 16 | | Report | | Stadium: University of Texas; Austin, Texas |

| 10:00am CST | Utah Valley | 1–1 | JMU | Field 5 |
| Fri, November 17 | | Report | | Stadium: University of Texas; Austin, Texas |

| 10:00am CST | Grand Valley | 4–3 | Houston | Field 6 |
| Fri, November 17 | | Report | | Stadium: University of Texas; Austin, Texas |

Group G
| Pos | Team | Pld | W | D | L | GF | GA | GD | SO | GFP | Pts | Qualification |
|---|---|---|---|---|---|---|---|---|---|---|---|---|
| 1 | Weber State "B" | 3 | 2 | 0 | 1 | 7 | 1 | +6 | 2 | 6 | 20 | Advanced to knockout stage |
| 2 | Oregon | 3 | 2 | 0 | 1 | 7 | 1 | +6 | 2 | 4 | 18 | Advanced to knockout stage |
| 3 | Rice | 3 | 2 | 0 | 1 | 3 | 3 | 0 | 2 | 3 | 17 | |
| 4 | MTSU | 3 | 0 | 0 | 3 | 0 | 12 | −12 | 0 | 0 | 0 | |

Scores

| 2:00pm CST | Weber State | 3–0 | Rice | Field 7 |
| Thu, November 16 | | Report | | Stadium: University of Texas; Austin, Texas |

| 2:00pm CST | Oregon | 6–0 | MTSU | Field 8 |
| Thu, November 16 | | Report | | Stadium: University of Texas; Austin, Texas |

| 8:00pm CST | MTSU | 0–4 | Weber State | Field 7 |
| Thu, November 16 | | Report | | Stadium: University of Texas; Austin, Texas |

| 8:00pm CST | Rice | 1–0 | Oregon | Field 8 |
| Thu, November 16 | | Report | | Stadium: University of Texas; Austin, Texas |

| 12:00pm CST | Weber State | 0–1 | Oregon | Field 1 |
| Fri, November 17 | | Report | | Stadium: University of Texas; Austin, Texas |

| 12:00pm CST | MTSU | 0–2 | Rice | Field 2 |
| Fri, November 17 | | Report | | Stadium: University of Texas; Austin, Texas |

Group H
| Pos | Team | Pld | W | D | L | GF | GA | GD | SO | GFP | Pts | Qualification |
|---|---|---|---|---|---|---|---|---|---|---|---|---|
| 1 | Virginia | 3 | 3 | 0 | 0 | 10 | 3 | +7 | 1 | 9 | 28 | Advanced to knockout stage |
| 2 | Texas "B" | 3 | 2 | 0 | 1 | 5 | 5 | 0 | 1 | 5 | 18 | Advanced to knockout stage |
| 3 | Colorado State "Gold" | 3 | 1 | 0 | 2 | 6 | 8 | −2 | 0 | 6 | 12 | |
| 4 | Louisiana | 3 | 0 | 0 | 3 | 1 | 6 | −5 | 0 | 1 | 1 | |

Scores

| 12:00pm CST | Colorado State | 2–1 | Louisiana | Field 9 |
| Thu, November 16 | | Report | | Stadium: University of Texas; Austin, Texas |

| 12:00pm CST | Virginia | 3–1 | Texas | Field 10 |
| Thu, November 16 | | Report | | Stadium: University of Texas; Austin, Texas |

| 6:00pm CST | Texas | 3–2 | Colorado State | Field 9 |
| Thu, November 16 | | Report | | Stadium: University of Texas; Austin, Texas |

| 6:00pm CST | Louisiana | 0–3 | Virginia | Field 10 |
| Thu, November 16 | | Report | | Stadium: University of Texas; Austin, Texas |

| 12:00pm CST | Colorado State | 2–4 | Virginia | Field 5 |
| Fri, November 17 | | Report | | Stadium: University of Texas; Austin, Texas |

| 12:00pm CST | Texas | 1–0 | Louisiana | Field 6 |
| Fri, November 17 | | Report | | Stadium: University of Texas; Austin, Texas |

=== Women's open ===
Group E
| Pos | Team | Pld | W | D | L | GF | GA | GD | SO | GFP | Pts | Qualification |
|---|---|---|---|---|---|---|---|---|---|---|---|---|
| 1 | Virginia | 2 | 3 | 0 | 0 | 9 | 1 | +8 | 2 | 7 | 27 | Advanced to knockout stage |
| 2 | Colorado State "Green" | 2 | 2 | 0 | 1 | 6 | 5 | +1 | 2 | 5 | 19 | Advanced to knockout stage |
| 3 | Texas | 2 | 1 | 0 | 2 | 1 | 7 | −6 | 1 | 1 | 8 | |
| 4 | No team fielded (Note: Each scheduled game recorded as 1–0 win giving each team an additional 8 points (6 points for the win, 1 point for the shutout, and 1 point for the "goal for")) | | | | | | | | | | | |

Scores

| 8:00am CST | Texas | 0–4 | Colorado State | Field 1 |
| Thu, November 16 | | Report | | Stadium: University of Texas; Austin, Texas |

| 4:00pm CST | Virginia | 3–0 | Texas | Field 1 |
| Thu, November 16 | | Report | | Stadium: University of Texas; Austin, Texas |

| 8:00am CST | Virginia | 5–1 | Colorado State | Field 2 |
| Fri, November 17 | | Report | | Stadium: University of Texas; Austin, Texas |

Group F
| Pos | Team | Pld | W | D | L | GF | GA | GD | SO | GFP | Pts | Qualification |
|---|---|---|---|---|---|---|---|---|---|---|---|---|
| 1 | Texas A&M | 3 | 2 | 0 | 1 | 8 | 4 | +4 | 1 | 7 | 20 | Advanced to knockout stage |
| 2 | Ohio | 3 | 2 | 0 | 1 | 7 | 2 | +5 | 2 | 5 | 19 | Advanced to knockout stage |
| 3 | Arizona | 3 | 1 | 0 | 2 | 4 | 5 | −1 | 0 | 4 | 10 | |
| 4 | Miami (FL) | 3 | 1 | 0 | 2 | 2 | 10 | −8 | 0 | 2 | 8 | |

Scores

| 10:00am CST | Ohio | 1–0 | Arizona | Field 1 |
| Thu, November 16 | | Report | | Stadium: University of Texas; Austin, Texas |

| 10:00am CST | Miami | 0–4 | Texas A&M | Field 2 |
| Thu, November 16 | | Report | | Stadium: University of Texas; Austin, Texas |

| 6:00pm CST | Texas A&M | 2–1 | Ohio | Field 1 |
| Thu, November 16 | | Report | | Stadium: University of Texas; Austin, Texas |

| 6:00pm CST | Arizona | 1–2 | Miami | Field 2 |
| Thu, November 16 | | Report | | Stadium: University of Texas; Austin, Texas |

| 8:00am CST | Ohio | 5–0 | Miami | Field 9 |
| Fri, November 17 | | Report | | Stadium: University of Texas; Austin, Texas |

| 8:00am CST | Texas A&M | 2–3 | Arizona | Field 10 |
| Fri, November 17 | | Report | | Stadium: University of Texas; Austin, Texas |

Group G
| Pos | Team | Pld | W | D | L | GF | GA | GD | SO | GFP | Pts | Qualification |
|---|---|---|---|---|---|---|---|---|---|---|---|---|
| 1 | Colorado "Black" | 3 | 2 | 1 | 0 | 10 | 1 | +9 | 2 | 6 | 23 | Advanced to knockout stage |
| 2 | San Diego State | 3 | 2 | 1 | 0 | 7 | 0 | +7 | 3 | 5 | 23 | Advanced to knockout stage |
| 3 | Georgia Tech | 3 | 1 | 0 | 2 | 7 | 7 | 0 | 0 | 4 | 10 | |
| 4 | Texas State | 3 | 0 | 0 | 3 | 1 | 17 | −16 | 0 | 1 | 1 | |

Scores

| 12:00pm CST | San Diego State | 2–0 | Georgia Tech | Field 1 |
| Thu, November 16 | | Report | | Stadium: University of Texas; Austin, Texas |

| 12:00pm CST | Colorado | 6–0 | Texas State | Field 2 |
| Thu, November 16 | | Report | | Stadium: University of Texas; Austin, Texas |

| 8:00pm CST | Texas State | 0–5 | San Diego State | Field 1 |
| Thu, November 16 | | Report | | Stadium: University of Texas; Austin, Texas |

| 8:00pm CST | Georgia Tech | 1–4 | Colorado | Field 2 |
| Thu, November 16 | | Report | | Stadium: University of Texas; Austin, Texas |

| 10:00am CST | San Diego State | 0–0 | Colorado | Field 1 |
| Fri, November 17 | | Report | | Stadium: University of Texas; Austin, Texas |

| 10:00am CST | Texas State | 1–6 | Georgia Tech | Field 2 |
| Fri, November 17 | | Report | | Stadium: University of Texas; Austin, Texas |

Group H
| Pos | Team | Pld | W | D | L | GF | GA | GD | SO | GFP | Pts | Qualification |
|---|---|---|---|---|---|---|---|---|---|---|---|---|
| 1 | JMU | 3 | 2 | 1 | 0 | 5 | 1 | +4 | 2 | 5 | 22 | Advanced to knockout stage |
| 2 | Rice | 3 | 2 | 0 | 1 | 5 | 4 | +1 | 1 | 5 | 18 | Advanced to knockout stage |
| 3 | Kansas | 3 | 1 | 1 | 1 | 5 | 3 | +2 | 1 | 5 | 15 | |
| 4 | LSU | 3 | 0 | 0 | 3 | 0 | 7 | −7 | 0 | 0 | 0 | |

Scores

| 2:00pm CST | Kansas | 1–1 | JMU | Field 1 |
| Thu, November 16 | | Report | | Stadium: University of Texas; Austin, Texas |

| 2:00pm CST | Rice | 3–0 | LSU | Field 2 |
| Thu, November 16 | | Report | | Stadium: University of Texas; Austin, Texas |

| 8:00pm CST | LSU | 0–3 | Kansas | Field 3 |
| Thu, November 16 | | Report | | Stadium: University of Texas; Austin, Texas |

| 8:00pm CST | JMU | 3–0 | Rice | Field 4 |
| Thu, November 16 | | Report | | Stadium: University of Texas; Austin, Texas |

| 10:00am CST | Kansas | 1–2 | Rice | Field 9 |
| Fri, November 17 | | Report | | Stadium: University of Texas; Austin, Texas |

| 10:00am CST | LSU | 0–1 | JMU | Field 10 |
| Fri, November 17 | | Report | | Stadium: University of Texas; Austin, Texas |

== Tournament bracket ==
=== Men's championship ===
Quarterfinals
Fri • 6:00pm • Field 3
BYU | 3
Weber State | 0
Fri • 6:00pm • Field 4
Penn State | 3
Utah | 0
Fri • 6:00pm • Field 5
Colorado | 0
Illinois | 1
Fri • 6:00pm • Field 6
Texas Tech (a.e.t.) | 2
Ohio | 1

Semifinals
Sat • 10:00am • Field 4
BYU | 2 (2)
Penn State (pen.) | 2 (4)
Sat • 10:00am • Field 5
Illinois | 2 (0)
Texas Tech (pen.) | 2 (2)

Final
Sat • 5:30pm • Field 3
Penn State | 2
Texas Tech | 0

=== Women's championship ===
Quarterfinals
Fri • 8:00pm • Field 3
Colorardo | 1
Michigan (pen.) | 2
Fri • 8:00pm • Field 4
Virginia Tech | 3
Miami (OH) | 1
Fri • 8:00pm • Field 5
Delaware | 1
Ohio State (pen.) | 2
Fri • 8:00pm • Field 6
Colorado State | 0
Penn State | 1

Semifinals
Sat • 10:00am • Field 6
Michigan | 1
Virginia Tech | 0
Sat • 10:00am • Field 8
Ohio State | 1
Penn State | 0

Final
Sat • 3:00pm • Field 3
Michigan (a.e.t.) | 1
Ohio State | 0

=== Men's open ===
Quarterfinals
Fri • 7:00pm • Field 7
Howard | 2
Utah Valley State | 1
Fri • 7:00pm • Field 8
Virginia | 2
Oregon (a.e.t.) | 3
Fri • 7:00pm • Field 9
JMU | 1
Texas | 0
Fri • 7:00pm • Field 10
Weber State "B" (a.e.t.) | 1
Florida | 0

Semifinals
Sat • 8:00am • Field 4
Howard | 1
Oregon | 3
Sat • 8:00am • Field 5
JMU | 2
Weber State "B" | 1

Final
Sat • 1:00pm • Field 4
Oregon | 0
JMU | 2

=== Women's open ===
Quarterfinals
Fri • 4:00pm • Field 7
Virginia | 3
Ohio | 0
Fri • 4:00pm • Field 8
JMU | 2
San Diego State | 0
Fri • 4:00pm • Field 9
Texas A&M | 0
Rice | 3
Fri • 4:00pm • Field 10
Colorado "Black" | 0
Colorado State "Green" | 2

Semifinals
Sat • 8:00am • Field 6
Virginia | 2
JMU | 1
Sat • 8:00am • Field 8
Rice (a.e.t.) | 2
Colorado State "Green" | 1

Final
Sat • 1:00pm • Field 6
Virginia | 1
Rice | 0

== All-tournament teams ==
=== Men's championship ===
| Name | Team |
|---|---|
| Reed Brubaker (Note: Most Valuable Player) | Penn State |
| Greg Gavlic | Ohio University |
| Mason Butler | Colorado |
| Ryan Taylor | Weber State |
| Will Minerick | Utah |
| Jeff Connell | Illinois |
| Dax Cuthbert | BYU |
| Darin Tranquillo | Penn State |
| Chance Abbott | Texas Tech |
| Matt Schaefer | Penn State |
| Eric Fores | Texas Tech |
| Mike Chandler | Texas Tech |

=== Women's championship ===
| Name | Team |
|---|---|
| Laura Rowland | Michigan |
| Panthini Desai | Penn State |
| Alyssa Grauman | Michigan |
| Tara Madigan | Delaware |
| Cathy Gibellato | Ohio State |
| Ryan Zwelling | Colorado |
| Alexis Brown | Virginia Tech |
| Libby Wann | Colorado State |
| Blake Miller | Penn State |
| Becca Rocco | Miami (OH) |
| Megan Brent | Ohio State |
| Shelly Noland | Michigan |

=== Men's open ===
| Name | Team |
|---|---|
| Sean Mannion | JMU |
| Leon Anderson | Howard |
| Ryan Heath | Weber State "B" |
| Cameron Stoddart | JMU |
| John Feely | Florida |
| Malik Ashiru | Virginia |
| Johnny Noris | Texas "B" |
| Eli Kerr | Utah Valley State |
| Jared Murray | Weber State "B" |
| Brian Woodward | Howard |
| Matt Tassos | Oregon |
| Dave Woodworth | Oregon |

=== Women's open ===
| Name | Team |
|---|---|
| Melissa Hancock | Virginia |
| Caitlin Rooney | JMU |
| Sara Jistel | Texas A&M |
| Casey Godfrey | Virginia |
| Nicole Miller | San Diego State |
| Jessie Chrismer | Colorado "Black" |
| Mandy Light | JMU |
| Lindsay Botsford | Rice |
| Gina Garbarino | Colorado State "Green" |
| Amy Cranston | Virginia |
| Alexa Shoning | Rice |
| Marlene Kaiser | Ohio University |
