= 1999 NIRSA National Soccer Championship =

- League: NIRSA
- Sport: Soccer
- Site: Georgia Southern; Statesboro, Georgia
- Duration: November 18–20, 1999
- Number of teams: 16 (men's championship); 16 (women's championship); 18 (men's open); 10 (women's open)
- Results: Official Results

Men's Championship Division
- Score: 2–0
- Champion: BYU (4th title, 4th title game)
- Runners-up: Texas Tech (2nd title game)
- Season MVP: Bryce Jolley (BYU)

Women's Championship Division
- Score: 0–0 (a.e.t.); 3–1 (pen.)
- Champion: Colorado State (2nd title, 2nd title game)
- Runners-up: Michigan (1st title game)
- Season MVP: Erin Ortega (Colorado State)

Men's Open Division
- Score: 2–0
- Champion: JMU (1st title, 1st title game)
- Runners-up: Florida State (1st title game)
- Season MVP: Sean Mannion (JMU)

Women's Open Division
- Score: 2–0
- Champion: Florida State (1st title, 2nd title game)
- Runners-up: Utah Valley State (1st title game)
- Top seed: Kelley Poole (Florida State)

NIRSA national soccer championships seasons
- ← 1998 2000 →

The 1999 NIRSA national soccer championship was the 6th NIRSA National Soccer Championships, the annual national championships for United States-based, collegiate club soccer teams organized by NIRSA. It took place at Georgia Southern University in Statesboro, Georgia from Thursday, November 18 to Saturday, November 20, 1999.

== Overview ==
=== Men's championship ===
The finals would see a rematch of the previous year's championship game between three time reigning champion, BYU, and 1997 open champions, Texas Tech. Prior to this, in the group stage, both teams would win all 3 games with Texas Tech beating Navy 1–0, undefeated Michigan 2–1, and Colorado 1–0 while BYU would beat Miami (OH) 3–2 after facing a second half deficit, then beat Penn State 2–0, and finally beat SCSL (now SCSA) tournament champions Mississippi State 1–0.

In the knockout round, Texas Tech would defeat Miami (OH) 4–0 in the quarterfinals then would beat Colorado State 3–0 in the semifinals to advance to their second straight finals. Meanwhile, in the quarterfinals, Michigan would score in the 10th minute against BYU to give them a 1–0 lead, but following Michigan receiving two red cards 10 minutes into the second half, BYU would score 3 straight goals in the final 30 minutes to defeat tournament favorites, Michigan, 3–1 in the quarterfinals. Then, in the semifinals, they would face in-state rival Weber State in a rematch of an earlier season matchup in Provo, Utah that Weber State won. In this rematch, BYU would win 3–0 with goals from sophomore Casey Waldron, freshman Brock Blake, and freshman Devin Matsumori to advance to their fourth straight finals in their fourth year participating in the tournament. In the first half of finals, eventual MVP and BYU junior midfielder, Bryce Jolley, would score on an assist from Brandon LeRoy in what would be the lone goal of the match as BYU won 1–0 and claimed their fourth straight national title. BYU also extended their NIRSA championship tournament win streak to 24 games after going four straight tournaments without a tie or loss.

=== Women's championship ===
In the finals, 1997 champions, Colorado State, would face finals debutants and Ohio River Soccer Conference (ORSC) runners-up, Michigan, in a rematch of the second group stage match for both teams. In the group stage, Michigan would tie their opener 1–1 to Virginia Tech while Colorado State would beat Illinois 3–0. In the second match of the group stage, Michigan would defeat Colorado State 1–0 and with Virginia Tech beating Illinois 2–0 in the otger match of the group, the standings going into the group stage finale had Virginia Tech and Michigan in first and second, respectively, and Colorado State in the elimination position of third. In the finale, Michigan would defeat Illinois 2–1 and, with Colorado State defeating Virginia Tech 3–1, Michigan would top the group and Colorado State would overtake Virginia Tech for second place.

In the quarterfinals, Colorado State would face reigning, back-to-back runners up and ORSC champions, Penn State, in a rematch of the 1997 finals, which Colorado State won 1-0, and of last year's quarterfinals, which Penn State won 2-1 in overtime. In the match, Colorado State would open the scoring in the 34th minute off of a free kick then would double their advantage in the 58th minute in route to a 2-0 win to advance to the semifinals. Meanwhile, Michigan would face region 6 champions, San Diego State, where Michigan's Debney Prauss scored two goals in a 2-1 win. In the semifinals, Colorado State would defeat ORSC semifinalists, Ohio State, 1–0 to advance to their second finals in three years while Michigan would defeat reigning champions, Colorado, 1–0 to advance to their first finals. In the finals, the game would be deadlocked at 0–0 at the end of regulation, meaning overtime would be required, for the second consecutive year. Overtime would also be scoreless meaning penalties would be required, again for the second consecutive year, to determine a champion. Colorado State would go on to win the shootout 3-1 and secured their second national title. Junior Erin Ortega of Colorado State would win her 2nd tournament MVP with the first being in 1997.

=== Men's open ===
In finals, JMU would face Florida State in what was the first finals for both teams. Prior to this, in the group stage, Florida State would win all three games while scoring 17 goals with a 4–1 win over Georgia Tech in their opener, then a 4–0 win over Oregon, and finally a 9–2 win over Toledo. Meanwhile, JMU would beat Colorado State "Gold" 2–1 in their opener, beat a no-show Miami (FL) 1–0 by forfeit, and finally tied MTSU 0–0.

In the quarterfinals, Florida State would defeat Clemson 1–0 while JMU defeated Oregon 2–0. In the semifinals, JMU would defeat reigning runner up, Virginia, 4–0 while Florida State would face in-state rival, Florida. The game would be tied 1–1 after regulation and overtime and Florida State would win in penalties to advance to their first finals. In the finals, JMU would defeat Florida State 2–0 to claim their first open title. JMU's Sean Mannion would be named the division's MVP

=== Women's open ===
In the finals, reigning open division runners up, Florida State, would face final debutants Utah Valley State in a rematch of both teams' second group stage match. Prior to this, in the group stage, Florida State would beat LSU 3–0 in their opener while Utah Valley State beat Georgia Tech 4–1 in theirs. In the second match for both teams, Florida State would defeat Utah Valley State 1–0. In the group stage finale, Florida State would beat Loyola 5–0 and win their group while Utah Valley State would lose 3–2 to Florida but would still have enough points to top their group.

In the quarterfinals, Utah Valley State would beat LSU 4–1 while Florida State would be tied 1–1 with reigning open champions, Colorado State "Green" in a rematch of the previous year's final. However, this year Florida State would defeat Colorado State "Green" with a golden goal in overtime to advance to the semifinals. In the semifinals, Utah Valley State would defeat hosts Georgia Southern 3–1 while Florida State would defeat in-state rival Florida to advance to their second straight finals. In the finals, Florida State would defeat Utah Valley State 2–0 to win their first open title. Former varsity soccer and softball player for Florida State, Kelley Poole of Florida State, would be named tournament MVP.

== Format ==
The competition consisted of 60 teams partitioned into 34 men's teams and 26 women's teams. Each of these partitions were further divided into a 16-team, invite-only championship division and an open division for the remaining teams. The championship divisions each had 16 teams divided into four groups of four teams each. The men's open division divided teams into three groups of four teams each and two groups of three teams each while the women's open division divided teams into two groups of three teams each and one group of four teams.

All 4 divisions began with a round-robin tournament. In the championship divisions, teams played each of the other teams in their group once. In the men's open, the three groups of four played each other once while the two groups of three teams played all three teams in the other group of three once. In the women's open division, the two groups of three teams played all three teams in the other group of three once while the one group of four played each of the other teams in their group once. Following this, in the championship division, the two best teams in each group advanced to a single-elimination, knockout round. In the men's open division, the best team in each group as well as the three best second placed teams. In the women's open division, the best two teams in each group advanced as well as the two best third placed teams. The first metric for determining the best team was points, calculated first by giving a team 6 points for a win, 3 points for a tie, and 0 points for a loss. Then, a team could be awarded an addition point for a shutout and an additional point for every goal scored, up to a max of 3 goals per game. If teams were tied on points, the following criteria were used in order:

1. Winner of head-to-head competition
2. Greatest goal difference
3. Most goals scored
4. Coin toss

The knockout stage was an 8-team tournament for each division. Knockout stage games needed to declare a winner, so if one was tied at the end of regulation, overtime would begin. Overtime in the quarterfinals consisted of two, 5-minute, golden-goal periods while in the semifinals and finals, overtime consisted of two, 10-minute, golden-goal periods. If still tied after overtime, kicks from the mark would determine the winner. Pool play and quarterfinal games were two 40-minute halves, separated by a seven-minute halftime with the semifinals and finals also being 40-minute halves, but having a ten minute halftime. If a player received three yellow cards during the course of the tournament they would be suspended the following the game.

== Qualification and selections ==
NIRSA extended invitations to the 16 men's and 16 women's teams to participate in the championship division beginning on October 25, 1999 with those invitations being extend to who NIRSA believed were the best in the nation. The teams that participated in the open division were chosen on a first-come first-serve basis with registration beginning on September 7, 1999.

=== Men's championship ===
Participating teams
Region	Team	Appearance	Last Bid
I	Penn State	3rd	1998
I	Navy	1st	Never
II	Georgia	3rd	1998
II	Mississippi State	1st	Never
II	Virginia Tech	1st	Never
III	Miami (OH)	3rd	1997
III	Ohio State	3rd	1997
III	Michigan	1st	Never
IV	Texas Tech	3rd	1998
IV	Southwest Texas State (Note: Would later be renamed "Texas State" in 2003)	2nd	1998
IV	LSU	1st	Never
V	Colorado	3rd	1997
V	Colorado State	3rd	1998
VI	BYU	4th	1998
VI	Arizona	1st	Never
VI	Weber State	1st	Never

=== Women's championship ===
Participating teams
Region	Team	Appearance	Last Bid
I	Penn State	5th	1998
I	Delaware	1st	Never
II	JMU	4th	1998
II	North Carolina	3rd	1998
II	Virginia Tech	2nd	1998
III	Miami (OH)	6th	1998
III	Ohio State	5th	1998
III	Purdue	5th	1997
III	Illinois	4th	1998
III	Michigan	1st	Never
IV	Texas A&M	3rd	1998
IV	Rice	1st	Never
V	Colorado	5th	1998
V	Colorado State	3rd	1998
VI	Salt Lake CC	4th	1998
VI	San Diego State	2nd	1996

=== Men's open ===
Region	Num	Team
I	1	Rutgers
II	10	Clemson, Georgia Southern, Virginia, MTSU, Florida, Georgia Tech, Florida State, JMU "Gold", JMU "Purple", Miami (FL)
III	3	Ohio University, Grand Valley State, Toledo
IV	1	Louisiana-Lafayette
V	1	Colorado State "Gold"
VI	2	Lane CC, Oregon

=== Women's open ===
Region	Num	Team
I	1	Loyola College (MD)
II	5	Georgia Southern, NC State, Georgia Tech, Florida, Florida State
III	0	–
IV	2	Kansas, LSU
V	1	Colorado State "Green"
VI	1	Utah Valley State

== Group stage ==
=== Men's championship ===
Group A
Pos	Team	Pld	W	D	L	GF	GA	GD	SO (Note: Shutouts)	GFP (Note: Goals for, points. The points gained by scoring with a max of 3 per game)	Pts	Qualification
1	Weber State	3	2	0	1	5	3	+2	1	5	18	Advanced to knockout stage
2	Ohio State	3	2	0	1	7	5	+2	0	6	18	Advanced to knockout stage
3	Southwest Texas State	3	1	0	2	4	3	+1	1	4	11	
4	Virginia Tech	3	1	0	2	3	8	−5	0	3	9	

Scores

8:00am EST	Weber State	1–0	Texas State	Field 5
Thu, November 18		Report		Stadium: Georgia Southern University; Statesboro, Georgia

8:00am EST	Virginia Tech	1–4	Ohio State	Field 6
Thu, November 18		Report		Stadium: Georgia Southern University; Statesboro, Georgia

2:00pm EST	Ohio State	1–3	Weber State	Field 7
Thu, November 18		Report		Stadium: Georgia Southern University; Statesboro, Georgia

2:00pm EST	Texas State	3–0	Virginia Tech	Field 8
Thu, November 18		Report		Stadium: Georgia Southern University; Statesboro, Georgia

10:00am EST	Weber State	1–2	Virginia Tech	Field 1
Fri, November 19		Report		Stadium: Georgia Southern University; Statesboro, Georgia

10:00am EST	Ohio State	2–1	Texas State	Field 2
Fri, November 19		Report		Stadium: Georgia Southern University; Statesboro, Georgia

Group B
Pos	Team	Pld	W	D	L	GF	GA	GD	SO	GFP	Pts	Qualification
1	Colorado State	3	3	0	0	11	4	+7	1	9	28	Advanced to knockout stage
2	Arizona	3	2	0	1	8	7	+1	0	8	20	Advanced to knockout stage
3	Georgia	3	1	0	2	5	7	−2	1	5	12	
4	LSU	3	0	0	3	2	8	−6	0	2	2	

Scores

8:00am EST	LSU	2–3	Arizona	Field 7
Thu, November 18		Report		Stadium: Georgia Southern University; Statesboro, Georgia

8:00am EST	Colorado State	4–2	Georgia	Field 8
Thu, November 18		Report		Stadium: Georgia Southern University; Statesboro, Georgia

2:00pm EST	Georgia	2–0	LSU	Field 5
Thu, November 18		Report		Stadium: Georgia Southern University; Statesboro, Georgia

2:00pm EST	Arizona	2–4	Colorado State	Field 6
Thu, November 18		Report		Stadium: Georgia Southern University; Statesboro, Georgia

10:00am EST	LSU	0–3	Colorado State	Field 5
Fri, November 19		Report		Stadium: Georgia Southern University; Statesboro, Georgia

10:00am EST	Georgia	1–3	Arizona	Field 6
Fri, November 19		Report		Stadium: Georgia Southern University; Statesboro, Georgia

Group C
Pos	Team	Pld	W	D	L	GF	GA	GD	SO	GFP	Pts	Qualification
1	Texas Tech	3	3	0	0	4	1	+3	2	4	24	Advanced to knockout stage
2	Michigan	3	2	0	1	3	2	+1	2	3	17	Advanced to knockout stage
3	Colorado	3	1	0	2	2	3	−1	0	2	8	
4	Navy	3	0	0	3	1	4	−3	0	1	1	

Scores

10:00am EST	Michigan	1–0	Colorado	Field 5
Thu, November 18		Report		Stadium: Georgia Southern University; Statesboro, Georgia

10:00am EST	Navy	0–1	Texas Tech	Field 6
Thu, November 18		Report		Stadium: Georgia Southern University; Statesboro, Georgia

4:00pm EST	Texas Tech	2–1	Michigan	Field 7
Thu, November 18		Report		Stadium: Georgia Southern University; Statesboro, Georgia

4:00pm EST	Colorado	2–1	Navy	Field 8
Thu, November 18		Report		Stadium: Georgia Southern University; Statesboro, Georgia

10:00am EST	Michigan	1–0	Navy	Field 7
Fri, November 19		Report		Stadium: Georgia Southern University; Statesboro, Georgia

10:00am EST	Texas Tech	1–0	Colorado	Field 8
Fri, November 19		Report		Stadium: Georgia Southern University; Statesboro, Georgia

Group D
Pos	Team	Pld	W	D	L	GF	GA	GD	SO	GFP	Pts	Qualification
1	BYU	3	3	0	0	6	2	+4	2	6	26	Advanced to knockout stage
2	Miami (OH)	3	2	0	1	4	3	+1	2	4	18	Advanced to knockout stage
3	Penn State	3	1	0	2	3	4	−1	0	3	9	
4	Mississippi State	3	0	0	3	1	5	−4	0	1	1	

Scores

10:00am EST	Mississippi State	1–3	Penn State	Field 7
Thu, November 18		Report		Stadium: Georgia Southern University; Statesboro, Georgia

10:00am EST	BYU	3–2	Miami (OH)	Field 8
Thu, November 18		Report		Stadium: Georgia Southern University; Statesboro, Georgia

4:00pm EST	Miami (OH)	1–0	Mississippi State	Field 5
Thu, November 18		Report		Stadium: Georgia Southern University; Statesboro, Georgia

4:00pm EST	Penn State	0–2	BYU	Field 6
Thu, November 18		Report		Stadium: Georgia Southern University; Statesboro, Georgia

10:00am EST	Mississippi State	0–1	BYU	Field 9
Fri, November 19		Report		Stadium: Georgia Southern University; Statesboro, Georgia

10:00am EST	Miami (OH)	1–0	Penn State	Field 10
Fri, November 19		Report		Stadium: Georgia Southern University; Statesboro, Georgia

=== Women's championship ===
Group A
Pos	Team	Pld	W	D	L	GF	GA	GD	SO	GFP	Pts	Qualification
1	North Carolina	3	2	1	0	3	1	+2	2	3	20	Advanced to knockout stage
2	Ohio State	3	2	0	1	7	3	+4	1	6	19	Advanced to knockout stage
3	Rice	3	1	0	2	5	6	−1	0	5	11	
4	Salt Lake CC	3	0	1	2	1	6	−5	1	1	5	

Scores

8:00am EST	Ohio State	3–2	Rice	Field 1
Thu, November 18		Report		Stadium: Georgia Southern University; Statesboro, Georgia

8:00am EST	North Carolina	0–0	Salt Lake CC	Field 2
Thu, November 18		Report		Stadium: Georgia Southern University; Statesboro, Georgia

2:00pm EST	Salt Lake CC	0–4	Ohio State	Field 1
Thu, November 18		Report		Stadium: Georgia Southern University; Statesboro, Georgia

2:00pm EST	Rice	1–2	North Carolina	Field 2
Thu, November 18		Report		Stadium: Georgia Southern University; Statesboro, Georgia

12:00pm EST	Ohio State	0–1	North Carolina	Field 1
Fri, November 19		Report		Stadium: Georgia Southern University; Statesboro, Georgia

12:00pm EST	Salt Lake CC	1–2	Rice	Field 2
Fri, November 19		Report		Stadium: Georgia Southern University; Statesboro, Georgia

Group B
Pos	Team	Pld	W	D	L	GF	GA	GD	SO	GFP	Pts	Qualification
1	JMU	3	1	2	0	3	1	+2	2	3	17	Advanced to knockout stage
2	Colorado	3	1	2	0	1	0	+1	3	1	16	Advanced to knockout stage
3	Delaware	3	1	1	1	4	3	+1	2	4	15	
4	Miami (OH)	3	0	1	2	0	4	−4	1	0	4	

Scores

10:00am EST	Miami (OH)	0–3	Delaware	Field 1
Thu, November 18		Report		Stadium: Georgia Southern University; Statesboro, Georgia

10:00am EST	JMU	0–0	Colorado	Field 2
Thu, November 18		Report		Stadium: Georgia Southern University; Statesboro, Georgia

4:00pm EST	Colorado	1–0	Miami (OH)	Field 1
Thu, November 18		Report		Stadium: Georgia Southern University; Statesboro, Georgia

4:00pm EST	Delaware	1–3	JMU	Field 2
Thu, November 18		Report		Stadium: Georgia Southern University; Statesboro, Georgia

12:00pm EST	Miami (OH)	0–0	JMU	Field 5
Fri, November 19		Report		Stadium: Georgia Southern University; Statesboro, Georgia

12:00pm EST	Colorado	0–0	Delaware	Field 6
Fri, November 19		Report		Stadium: Georgia Southern University; Statesboro, Georgia

Group C
Pos	Team	Pld	W	D	L	GF	GA	GD	SO	GFP	Pts	Qualification
1	Penn State	3	2	0	1	8	1	+7	2	6	20	Advanced to knockout stage
2	San Diego State	3	2	0	1	3	1	+2	2	3	17	Advanced to knockout stage
3	Texas A&M	3	2	0	1	3	5	−2	1	3	16	
4	Purdue	3	0	0	3	1	8	−7	0	1	1	

Scores

10:00am EST	Penn State	0–1	San Diego State	Field 1
Thu, November 18		Report		Stadium: Georgia Southern University; Statesboro, Georgia

10:00am EST	Purdue	1–2	Texas A&M	Field 2
Thu, November 18		Report		Stadium: Georgia Southern University; Statesboro, Georgia

4:00pm EST	Texas A&M	0–4	Penn State	Field 1
Thu, November 18		Report		Stadium: Georgia Southern University; Statesboro, Georgia

4:00pm EST	San Diego State	2–0	Purdue	Field 2
Thu, November 18		Report		Stadium: Georgia Southern University; Statesboro, Georgia

10:00am EST	Penn State	4–0	Purdue	Field 7
Fri, November 19		Report		Stadium: Georgia Southern University; Statesboro, Georgia

10:00am EST	Texas A&M	1–0	San Diego State	Field 8
Fri, November 19		Report		Stadium: Georgia Southern University; Statesboro, Georgia

Group D
Pos	Team	Pld	W	D	L	GF	GA	GD	SO	GFP	Pts	Qualification
1	Michigan	3	2	1	0	4	2	+2	1	4	20	Advanced to knockout stage
2	Colorado State	3	2	0	1	6	2	+4	1	6	19	Advanced to knockout stage
3	Virginia Tech	3	1	1	1	4	4	0	1	4	14	
4	Illinois	3	0	0	3	1	7	−6	0	1	1	

Scores

12:00pm EST	Illinois	0–3	Colorado State	Field 3
Thu, November 18		Report		Stadium: Georgia Southern University; Statesboro, Georgia

12:00pm EST	Michigan	1–1	Virginia Tech	Field 4
Thu, November 18		Report		Stadium: Georgia Southern University; Statesboro, Georgia

6:00pm EST	Virginia Tech	2–0	Illinois	Field 3
Thu, November 18		Report		Stadium: Georgia Southern University; Statesboro, Georgia

6:00pm EST	Colorado State	0–1	Michigan	Field 4
Thu, November 18		Report		Stadium: Georgia Southern University; Statesboro, Georgia

12:00pm EST	Illinois	1–2	Michigan	Field 3
Fri, November 19		Report		Stadium: Georgia Southern University; Statesboro, Georgia

12:00pm EST	Virginia Tech	1–3	Colorado State	Field 4
Fri, November 19		Report		Stadium: Georgia Southern University; Statesboro, Georgia

=== Men's open ===
Group E
Pos	Team	Pld	W	D	L	GF	GA	GD	SO	GFP	Pts	Qualification
1	JMU "Gold"	3	2	1	0	3	1	+2	2	3	20	Advanced to knockout stage
2	Colorado State	3	2	0	1	3	2	+1	2	3	17	
3	MTSU	3	1	1	1	1	1	0	2	1	12	
4	Miami (FL)	Did not attend (Note: Each scheduled game recorded as 1–0 win giving each team an additional 8 points (6 points for the win, 1 point for the shutout, and 1 point for the "goal for"))										

Scores

8:00am EST	JMU	2–1	Colorado State	Field 3
Thu, November 18		Report		Stadium: Georgia Southern University; Statesboro, Georgia

2:00pm EST	MTSU	0–0	JMU	Field 3
Thu, November 18		Report		Stadium: Georgia Southern University; Statesboro, Georgia

8:00am EST	MTSU	0–1	Colorado State	Field 2
Fri, November 19		Report		Stadium: Georgia Southern University; Statesboro, Georgia

Group F
Pos	Team	Pld	W	D	L	GF	GA	GD	SO	GFP	Pts	Qualification
1	Virginia	3	3	0	0	8	4	+4	1	8	27	Advanced to knockout stage
2	Ohio University	3	1	1	1	7	5	+2	1	7	17	Advanced to knockout stage
3	Georgia Southern	3	1	1	1	8	6	+2	0	7	16	
4	Grand Valley State	3	0	0	3	2	9	−7	0	2	2	

Scores

10:00am EST	Virginia	3–2	Ohio	Field 3
Thu, November 18		Report		Stadium: Georgia Southern University; Statesboro, Georgia

10:00am EST	Georgia Southern	4–1	Grand Valley	Field 4
Thu, November 18		Report		Stadium: Georgia Southern University; Statesboro, Georgia

4:00pm EST	Grand Valley	0–2	Virginia	Field 3
Thu, November 18		Report		Stadium: Georgia Southern University; Statesboro, Georgia

4:00pm EST	Ohio	2–2	Georgia Southern	Field 4
Thu, November 18		Report		Stadium: Georgia Southern University; Statesboro, Georgia

8:00am EST	Virginia	3–2	Georgia Southern	Field 8
Fri, November 19		Report		Stadium: Georgia Southern University; Statesboro, Georgia

8:00am EST	Grand Valley	0–3	Ohio	Field 9
Fri, November 19		Report		Stadium: Georgia Southern University; Statesboro, Georgia

Group G
Pos	Team	Pld	W	D	L	GF	GA	GD	SO	GFP	Pts	Qualification
1	Florida State	3	3	0	0	17	3	+14	1	9	28	Advanced to knockout stage
2	Oregon	3	2	0	1	6	5	+1	1	4	17	Advanced to knockout stage
3	Georgia Tech	3	0	1	2	5	12	−7	0	5	8	
4	Toledo	3	0	1	2	5	13	−8	0	5	8	

Scores

12:00pm EST	Florida State	4–1	Georgia Tech	Field 5
Thu, November 18		Report		Stadium: Georgia Southern University; Statesboro, Georgia

12:00pm EST	Toledo	0–1	Oregon	Field 6
Thu, November 18		Report		Stadium: Georgia Southern University; Statesboro, Georgia

6:00pm EST	Oregon	0–4	Florida State	Field 5
Thu, November 18		Report		Stadium: Georgia Southern University; Statesboro, Georgia

6:00pm EST	Georgia Tech	3–3	Toledo	Field 6
Thu, November 18		Report		Stadium: Georgia Southern University; Statesboro, Georgia

8:00am EST	Florida State	9–2	Toledo	Field 10
Fri, November 19		Report		Stadium: Georgia Southern University; Statesboro, Georgia

8:00am EST	Oregon	5–1	Georgia Tech	Field 11
Fri, November 19		Report		Stadium: Georgia Southern University; Statesboro, Georgia

Group H
Pos	Team	Pld	W	D	L	GF	GA	GD	SO	GFP	Pts	Qualification
1	Florida	3	3	0	0	12	1	+11	2	9	29	Advanced to knockout stage
2	Lane CC	3	2	1	0	8	3	+5	0	7	22	Advanced to knockout stage
3	Louisiana	3	2	0	1	9	3	+6	1	6	19	
Group I
Pos	Team	Pld	W	D	L	GF	GA	GD	SO	GFP	Pts	Qualification
1	Clemson	3	1	0	2	2	8	−6	1	2	9	Advanced to knockout stage
2	JMU "Purple"	3	0	1	2	2	10	−8	0	2	5	
3	Rutgers	3	0	0	3	3	11	−8	0	3	3	

Scores

12:00pm EST	Florida	4–0	Rutgers	Field 7
Thu, November 18		Report		Stadium: Georgia Southern University; Statesboro, Georgia

12:00pm EST	Louisiana	0–1	Clemson	Field 8
Thu, November 18		Report		Stadium: Georgia Southern University; Statesboro, Georgia

12:00pm EST	Lane CC	1–1	JMU	Field 9
Thu, November 18		Report		Stadium: Georgia Southern University; Statesboro, Georgia

6:00pm EST	Clemson	0–4	Florida	Field 7
Thu, November 18		Report		Stadium: Georgia Southern University; Statesboro, Georgia

6:00pm EST	JMU	0–5	Louisiana	Field 8
Thu, November 18		Report		Stadium: Georgia Southern University; Statesboro, Georgia

6:00pm EST	Rutgers	1–3	Lane CC	Field 9
Thu, November 18		Report		Stadium: Georgia Southern University; Statesboro, Georgia

8:00am EST	Florida	4–1	JMU	Field 5
Fri, November 19		Report		Stadium: Georgia Southern University; Statesboro, Georgia

8:00am EST	Louisiana	4–2	Rutgers	Field 6
Fri, November 19		Report		Stadium: Georgia Southern University; Statesboro, Georgia

8:00am EST	Lane CC	4–1	Clemson	Field 7
Fri, November 19		Report		Stadium: Georgia Southern University; Statesboro, Georgia

=== Women's open ===
Group F
Pos	Team	Pld	W	D	L	GF	GA	GD	SO	GFP	Pts	Qualification
1	NC State	3	2	0	1	3	1	+2	2	3	17	Advanced to knockout stage
2	Georgia Southern	3	2	0	1	3	5	−2	1	3	16	Advanced to knockout stage
3	Colorado State "Green"	3	1	1	1	5	2	+3	1	4	14	Advanced to knockout stage
4	Kansas	3	0	1	2	2	5	−3	0	2	5	

Scores

8:00am EST	Colorado State	4–0	Georgia Southern	Field 1
Thu, November 18		Report		Stadium: Georgia Southern University; Statesboro, Georgia

8:00am EST	Kansas	0–2	NC State	Field 2
Thu, November 18		Report		Stadium: Georgia Southern University; Statesboro, Georgia

2:00pm EST	NC State	1–0	Colorado State	Field 1
Thu, November 18		Report		Stadium: Georgia Southern University; Statesboro, Georgia

2:00pm EST	Georgia Southern	2–1	Kansas	Field 2
Thu, November 18		Report		Stadium: Georgia Southern University; Statesboro, Georgia

8:00am EST	Colorado State	1–1	Kansas	Field 1
Fri, November 19		Report		Stadium: Georgia Southern University; Statesboro, Georgia

8:00am EST	NC State	0–1	Georgia Southern	Field 2
Fri, November 19		Report		Stadium: Georgia Southern University; Statesboro, Georgia

Group E
Pos	Team	Pld	W	D	L	GF	GA	GD	SO	GFP	Pts	Qualification
1	Utah Valley State	3	1	0	2	6	5	+1	0	5	11	Advanced to knockout stage
2	Loyola (MD)	3	1	0	2	2	7	−5	1	2	9	Advanced to knockout stage
3	LSU	3	0	1	2	3	9	−6	0	3	6	Advanced to knockout stage
Group G
Pos	Team	Pld	W	D	L	GF	GA	GD	SO	GFP	Pts	Qualification
1	Florida State	3	3	0	0	9	1	+8	2	7	27	Advanced to knockout stage
2	Florida	3	3	0	0	10	3	+7	1	8	27	Advanced to knockout stage
3	Georgia Tech	3	0	1	2	2	7	−5	0	2	5	

Scores

10:00am EST	Utah Valley	4–1	Georgia Tech	Field 9
Thu, November 18		Report		Stadium: Georgia Southern University; Statesboro, Georgia

10:00am EST	LSU	1–3	Florida State	Field 10
Thu, November 18		Report		Stadium: Georgia Southern University; Statesboro, Georgia

10:00am EST	Loyola	0–2	Florida	Field 11
Thu, November 18		Report		Stadium: Georgia Southern University; Statesboro, Georgia

4:00pm EST	Florida State	1–0	Utah Valley	Field 9
Thu, November 18		Report		Stadium: Georgia Southern University; Statesboro, Georgia

4:00pm EST	Florida	5–1	LSU	Field 10
Thu, November 18		Report		Stadium: Georgia Southern University; Statesboro, Georgia

4:00pm EST	Georgia Tech	0–2	Loyola	Field 11
Thu, November 18		Report		Stadium: Georgia Southern University; Statesboro, Georgia

10:00am EST	Utah Valley	2–3	Florida	Field 3
Fri, November 19		Report		Stadium: Georgia Southern University; Statesboro, Georgia

10:00am EST	LSU	1–1	Georgia Tech	Field 4
Fri, November 19		Report		Stadium: Georgia Southern University; Statesboro, Georgia

10:00am EST	Loyola	0–5	Florida State	Field 11
Fri, November 19		Report		Stadium: Georgia Southern University; Statesboro, Georgia

== Tournament bracket ==
=== Men's championship ===
Quarterfinals
Fri • 6:00pm • Field 5
Weber State	1
Arizona	0
Fri • 6:00pm • Field 6
BYU	3
Michigan	1
Fri • 6:00pm • Field 7
Texas Tech	4
Miami (OH)	0
Fri • 6:00pm • Field 8
Colorado State	3
Ohio State	1

Semifinals
Sat • 10:00am • Field 1
Weber State	0
BYU	3
Sat • 10:00am • Field 3
Texas Tech	3
Colorado State	0

Final
Sat • 5:00pm • Field 8
BYU	1
Texas Tech	0

=== Women's championship ===
Quarterfinals
Fri • 6:00pm • Field 1
North Carolina	0
Colorado	2
Fri • 6:00pm • Field 2
Michigan	2
San Diego State	1
Fri • 6:00pm • Field 3
JMU	0
Ohio State (a.e.t.)	1
Fri • 6:00pm • Field 4
Penn State	0
Colorado State	2

Semifinals
Sat • 10:00am • Field 4
Colorado	0
Michigan	1
Sat • 10:00am • Field 6
Ohio State	0
Colorado State	1

Final
Sat • 3:00pm • Field 7
Michigan	0
Colorado State (pen.)	1

=== Men's open ===
Quarterfinals
Fri • 4:30pm • Field 1
Florida	2
Ohio University	1
Fri • 4:30pm • Field 2
Florida State	1
Clemson	0
Fri • 4:30pm • Field 3
Virginia	2
Lane CC	1
Fri • 4:30pm • Field 4
JMU "Gold"	2
Oregon	0

Semifinals
Sat • 8:00am • Field 1
Florida	1
Florida State (pen.)	2
Sat • 8:00am • Field 3
Virginia	0
JMU	4

Final
Sat • 1:00pm • Field 2
Florida State	0
JMU	2

=== Women's open ===
Quarterfinals
Fri • 4:30pm • Field 5
Florida State (a.e.t.)	2
Colorado State "Green"	1
Fri • 4:30pm • Field 6
NC State	1
Florida	4
Fri • 4:30pm • Field 7
Utah Valley State	4
LSU	1
Fri • 4:30pm • Field 8
Georgia Southern	3
Loyola (MD)	1

Semifinals
Sat • 8:00am • Field 4
Florida State	1
Florida	0
Sat • 8:00am • Field 6
Utah Valley State	3
Georgia Southern	1

Final
Sat • 1:00pm • Field 5
Florida State	2
Utah Valley State	0

== All-tournament teams ==
=== Men's championship ===
Name	Team
Bryce Jolley (Note: Most Valuable Player)	BYU
Josh Katke	Michigan
Brandon LeRoy	BYU
Andrew Morton	Texas Tech
Nate Lei	Miami (OH)
Julian Rizo	Colorado State
Jeff Dupre	Texas Tech
Dax Cuthbert	BYU
Brandon Miller	Weber State
Adam Crider	Ohio State
Colin Cotter	Arizona
Josh Baker	Texas Tech

=== Women's championship ===
Name	Team
Erin Ortega	Colorado State
Blythe Hardie	North Carolina
Colleen McPherson	Ohio State
Jenny Kelly	Colorado State
Ashley Simpson	Penn State
Deidra Azurra	Colorado
Shelley Noland	Michigan
Erin Gilman	JMU
Julie Trommeter	Colorado State
Amanda Erhardt	San Diego State
Kathryn Iammarino	Ohio State
Jessica Fisher	Michigan

=== Men's open ===
Name	Team
Sean Mannion	JMU
Andres Buenfil	Florida
Malik Achiru	Virginia
Robert Clarke	Florida State
Cameron Stoddart	JMU
Julio Vega	Florida
Scott Nagel	Florida State
Thamer Al-abdullah	Lane CC
Greig Warwick	JMU
Landon Moore	Virginia
Christian Lafreniere	JMU

=== Women's open ===
Name	Team
Kelley Poole	Florida State
Jen Conrad	Florida
Lindsay Grossman	Georgia Southern
Michelle Palmer	Florida State
Rachel Taylor	Utah Valley State
Lisa Schreiber	Colorado State
Meghan Asay	Utah Valley State
Nicole Neth	NC State
Kelli Maggio	LSU
Emily Hall	Florida
Jessica Holmes	Florida State
Kelli Earle	Florida State
