= 2021 SCSA Regional Tournament =

- Association: NIRSA
- League: Southeast Collegiate Soccer Alliance
- Sport: Soccer
- Site: ECU's North Recreational Complex; Greenville, NC
- Duration: October 29–31, 2021
- Teams: 16 (men's); 12 (women's)

Men's Championship Division
- Score: 2–1
- Champion: North Carolina (1st title, 4th title game)
- Runners-up: Appalachian State (1st title game)

Women's Championship Division
- Score: 2–0
- Champion: North Carolina (7th title, 7th title game)
- Runners-up: Georgia Tech (1st title game)

Southeast Collegiate Soccer Alliance seasons
- ← 2019 2022

The 2021 Southeast Collegiate Soccer Alliance Regional Tournament was the 11th edition of the Southeast Collegiate Soccer Alliance's postseason club soccer tournament, which was held at ECU's North Recreational Complex in Greenville, North Carolina, from October 29–31, 2021. A tournament was held for each the men's and women's division, with each tournament champion receiving an automatic bid to the 2021 NIRSA National Soccer Championship's championship division. The remaining 2 of NIRSA Region II's automatic bids for each division were given out based on RPI, with a special consideration to this tournament's performance. This tournament marked the first SCSA regional tournament held since the COVID-19 pandemic and was an expansion of the previous tournament with both divisions adding 4 teams.

== Format ==
The tournament consisted of 12 women's teams and 16 men's teams. Each divisional champion received an automatic bid (6 for the women and 8 for the men) with the remaining wild card teams being the next highest RPI ranked teams that had not already qualified. Teams were divided into groups based on RPI.

For the men's division group stage, the 16 teams were split into four groups of four teams each. Each team played every other team in their group meaning a total of 6 games were played within a group. The top two teams from each group advanced to the round of 8.

For the women's division group stage, the 12 teams were split into four groups of three teams each. Each team played every other team in their group meaning a total of 3 games were played within a group. The top two teams from each group advanced to the round of 8.

Pool play games were two 35-minute halves, separated by a seven-minute halftime and utilized the three points for a win system. After pool play, the two highest ranked teams from each group advanced to their respective gender division's knockout stage.

Tie-breaking criteria for group play
The ranking of teams in each group was based on the following criteria in order:
1. Highest number of points
2. Winner of head-to-head competition
3. Greatest goal difference
  - Maximum ± 5 goal difference per match
4. Most goals scored
5. Most shutouts

In a tie-breaking scenario involving more than 2 teams, the tiebreaker procedure would begin. If one team is identified as different and both remaining teams are still tied, the procedure is restarted.

If a tie still remained after the first 5 criteria, the following was used to break a tie:

1. NCAA kicks from the mark
  - If there was a three-way tie, a coin-flip would be conducted. The two teams that chose the same outcome would compete in kicks from the mark between each other. The winner would compete with the last remaining team in kicks from the mark
  - If there's a four-way tie, a drawing of lots would be conducted

Knockout stage games also consisted of two 35-minute halves. The quarterfinals were separated by a seven-minute halftime while the semifinals and finals had a ten minute halftime. Knockout stage games needed to declare a winner. If a knockout-stage game was tied at the end of regulation, overtime would begin. Overtime consisted of one, 15-minute, golden-goal period. If still tied after overtime, kicks from the mark would determine the winner.

== Participants ==
=== Men's ===
Divisional champions
Division	Team	Appearance	Last bid
Coastal South	UCF	9th	2019
Mountain East	Georgia Tech	6th	2019
Atlantic South	NC State	6th	2018
Mountain North	NKU	3rd	2019
Mid-Atlantic	Appalachian State	3rd	2016
Mountain West	Emory	2nd	2016
Atlantic North	JMU	2nd	2014
Coastal North	USF	1st	Never

At-large bids
Division	Team	Appearance	Last bid
Atlantic South	North Carolina	11th	2019
Coastal North	Florida	10th	2019
Atlantic North	Virginia	10th	2019
Mountain East	Clemson	8th	2019
Atlantic North	Virginia Tech	7th	2018
Coastal South	Miami	3rd	2017
Mountain North	Tennessee	3rd	2013
Atlantic North	William & Mary	2nd	2018

=== Women's ===
Divisional champions
Division	Team	Appearance	Last bid
Florida	Florida	11th	2019
Northeast	North Carolina	11th	2019
North	Virginia	10th	2018
Southeast	Clemson	9th	2019
Northwest	Vanderbilt	7th	2019
Southwest	Georgia Tech	4th	2019

At-large bids
Division	Team	Appearance	Last bid
North	Virginia Tech	11th	2019
Northeast	East Carolina	6th	2018
Florida	UCF	5th	2018
Florida	Florida State	5th	2017
Northeast	Wake Forest	2nd	2018
North	William & Mary	1st	Never

== Group stage ==
=== Men's ===
Group A
Pos	Team	Pld	W	D	L	GF	GA	GD	Pts	Qualification
1	NC State	2	1	0	1	1	1	0	6	Advanced to knockout stage
2	USF	2	1	0	1	1	1	0	6	Advanced to knockout stage
3	William & Mary	2	1	0	1	1	1	0	6	
4	Clemson	Did not attend								

Scores

7:00pm EST	William & Mary	1–0	USF	Field 3
Fri, October 29		Report		Stadium: ECU's North Recreational Complex; Greenville, NC

8:30am EST	William & Mary	0–1	NC State	Field 3
Sat, October 30		Report		Stadium: ECU's North Recreational Complex; Greenville, NC

11:30am EST	NC State	0–1	USF	Field 4
Sat, October 30		Report		Stadium: ECU's North Recreational Complex; Greenville, NC

Penalty Tiebreaker

1:00pm EST	NC State	1–0; Coin flip	USF, Will & Mary	Field 4
Sat, October 30				Stadium: ECU's North Recreational Complex; Greenville, NC

1:00pm EST	USF	1–0; PKs (Elimination)	Will & Mary	Field 4
Sat, October 30				Stadium: ECU's North Recreational Complex; Greenville, NC

1:00pm EST	NC State	1–0; PKs (Seeding)	USF	Field 4
Sat, October 30				Stadium: ECU's North Recreational Complex; Greenville, NC

Group B
Pos	Team	Pld	W	D	L	GF	GA	GD	Pts	Qualification
1	UCF	3	2	1	0	5	1	+4	7	Advanced to knockout stage
2	Emory	3	1	1	1	3	2	+1	4	Advanced to knockout stage
3	JMU	3	1	1	1	4	5	−1	4	
4	Tennessee	3	0	1	2	3	7	−4	1	

7:00pm EST	JMU	1–1	UCF	Field 5
Fri, October 29		Report		Stadium: ECU's North Recreational Complex; Greenville, NC

8:30pm EST	Emory	1–1	Tennessee	Field 6
Fri, October 29		Report		Stadium: ECU's North Recreational Complex; Greenville, NC

10:00am EST	JMU	0–2	Emory	Field 5
Sat, October 30		Report		Stadium: ECU's North Recreational Complex; Greenville, NC

10:00am EST	UCF	3–0	Tennessee	Field 6
Sat, October 30		Report		Stadium: ECU's North Recreational Complex; Greenville, NC

2:00pm EST	JMU	3–2	Tennessee	Field 5
Sat, October 30		Report		Stadium: ECU's North Recreational Complex; Greenville, NC

2:00pm EST	UCF	1–0	Emory	Field 6
Sat, October 30		Report		Stadium: ECU's North Recreational Complex; Greenville, NC

Group C
Pos	Team	Pld	W	D	L	GF	GA	GD	Pts	Qualification
1	North Carolina	3	2	1	0	6	1	+5	7	Advanced to knockout stage
2	Virginia Tech	3	2	1	0	5	3	+2	7	Advanced to knockout stage
3	Miami	3	1	0	2	6	4	+2	3	
4	NKU	3	0	0	3	3	12	−9	0	

7:00pm EST	Miami	0–1	Virginia Tech	Field 6
Fri, October 29		Report		Stadium: ECU's North Recreational Complex; Greenville, NC

8:30pm EST	NKU	0–3	North Carolina	Field 5
Fri, October 29		Report		Stadium: ECU's North Recreational Complex; Greenville, NC

8:30am EST	NKU	0–5	Miami	Field 5
Sat, October 30		Report		Stadium: ECU's North Recreational Complex; Greenville, NC

8:30am EST	North Carolina	0–0	Virginia Tech	Field 6
Sat, October 30		Report		Stadium: ECU's North Recreational Complex; Greenville, NC

11:30am EST	NKU	3–4	Virginia Tech	Field 5
Sat, October 30		Report		Stadium: ECU's North Recreational Complex; Greenville, NC

11:30am EST	North Carolina	3–1	Miami	Field 6
Sat, October 30		Report		Stadium: ECU's North Recreational Complex; Greenville, NC

Group D
Pos	Team	Pld	W	D	L	GF	GA	GD	Pts	Qualification
1	Appalachian State	3	1	2	0	5	4	+1	5	Advanced to knockout stage
2	Georgia Tech	3	1	1	1	5	3	+2	4	Advanced to knockout stage
3	Virginia	3	0	3	0	3	3	0	3	
4	Florida	3	0	2	1	1	4	−3	2	

8:30pm EST	Georgia Tech	1–1	Virginia	Field 3
Fri, October 29		Report		Stadium: ECU's North Recreational Complex; Greenville, NC

8:30pm EST	Appalachian State	1–1	Florida	Field 4
Fri, October 29		Report		Stadium: ECU's North Recreational Complex; Greenville, NC

10:00am EST	Georgia Tech	1–2	Appalachian State	Field 3
Sat, October 30		Report		Stadium: ECU's North Recreational Complex; Greenville, NC

10:00am EST	Virginia	0–0	Florida	Field 4
Sat, October 30		Report		Stadium: ECU's North Recreational Complex; Greenville, NC

2:00pm EST	Georgia Tech	3–0	Florida	Field 3
Sat, October 30		Report		Stadium: ECU's North Recreational Complex; Greenville, NC

2:00pm EST	Virginia	2–2	Appalachian State	Field 4
Sat, October 30		Report		Stadium: ECU's North Recreational Complex; Greenville, NC

=== Women's ===
Pos	Team	Pld	W	D	L	GF	GA	GD	Pts	Qualification
1	Georgia Tech	2	2	0	0	6	1	+5	6	Advanced to knockout stage
2	East Carolina	2	0	1	1	2	4	−2	1	Advanced to knockout stage
3	UCF	2	0	1	1	1	4	−3	1	

7:00pm EST	Georgia Tech	3–0	UCF	Field 7
Fri, October 29		Report		Stadium: ECU's North Recreational Complex; Greenville, NC

8:30am EST	Georgia Tech	3–1	East Carolina	Field 7
Sat, October 30		Report		Stadium: ECU's North Recreational Complex; Greenville, NC

11:30am EST	UCF	1–1	East Carolina	Field 7
Sat, October 30		Report		Stadium: ECU's North Recreational Complex; Greenville, NC

Pos	Team	Pld	W	D	L	GF	GA	GD	Pts	Qualification
1	Virginia	2	2	0	0	2	0	+2	6	Advanced to knockout stage
2	Florida	2	1	0	1	3	1	+2	3	Advanced to knockout stage
3	William & Mary	2	0	0	2	0	4	−4	0	

7:00pm EST	Florida	3–0	William & Mary	Field 8
Fri, October 29		Report		Stadium: ECU's North Recreational Complex; Greenville, NC

8:30am EST	Florida	0–1	Virginia	Field 8
Sat, October 30		Report		Stadium: ECU's North Recreational Complex; Greenville, NC

11:30am EST	William & Mary	0–1	Virginia	Field 8
Sat, October 30		Report		Stadium: ECU's North Recreational Complex; Greenville, NC

Pos	Team	Pld	W	D	L	GF	GA	GD	Pts	Qualification
1	Clemson	2	2	0	0	4	2	+2	6	Advanced to knockout stage
2	Virginia Tech	2	1	0	1	3	1	+2	3	Advanced to knockout stage
3	Wake Forest	2	0	0	2	2	6	−4	0	

8:30pm EST	Clemson	1–0	Virginia Tech	Field 7
Fri, October 29		Report		Stadium: ECU's North Recreational Complex; Greenville, NC

10:00am EST	Clemson	3–2	Wake Forest	Field 7
Sat, October 30		Report		Stadium: ECU's North Recreational Complex; Greenville, NC

2:00pm EST	Virginia Tech	3–0	Wake Forest	Field 7
Sat, October 30		Report		Stadium: ECU's North Recreational Complex; Greenville, NC

Pos	Team	Pld	W	D	L	GF	GA	GD	Pts	Qualification
1	North Carolina	2	2	0	0	3	1	+2	6	Advanced to knockout stage
2	Vanderbilt	2	1	0	1	1	1	0	3	Advanced to knockout stage
3	Florida State	2	0	0	2	1	3	−2	0	

8:30pm EST	North Carolina	2–1	Florida State	Field 8
Fri, October 29		Report		Stadium: ECU's North Recreational Complex; Greenville, NC

10:00am EST	North Carolina	1–0	Vanderbilt	Field 8
Sat, October 30		Report		Stadium: ECU's North Recreational Complex; Greenville, NC

2:00pm EST	Florida State	0–1	Vanderbilt	Field 8
Sat, October 30		Report		Stadium: ECU's North Recreational Complex; Greenville, NC

== Tournament bracket ==
=== Men's ===
Quarterfinals
Sat • 4:30pm • Field 3
NC State	0
Virginia Tech	1
Sat • 4:30pm • Field 4
North Carolina	1
USF	0
Sat • 6:00pm • Field 3
Appalachian State	3
Emory	2
Sat • 6:00pm • Field 4
UCF	4
Georgia Tech	1

Semifinals
Sun • 8:00am • Field 5
Virginia Tech	0
North Carolina	1
Sun • 8:00am • Field 6
Appalachian State	1
UCF	0

Final
Sun • 11:00am • Field 3
North Carolina	2
Appalachian State	1

=== Women's ===
Quarterfinals
Sat • 4:30pm • Field 5
Georgia Tech	1
Florida	0
Sat • 4:30pm • Field 6
Virginia	4
East Carolina	1
Sat • 6:00pm • Field 5
Clemson	0
Vanderbilt	1
Sat • 6:00pm • Field 6
North Carolina	2
Virginia Tech	1

Semifinals
Sun • 8:00am • Field 3
Georgia Tech	1
Virginia	0
Sun • 8:00am • Field 4
North Carolina	1
Vanderbilt	0

Final
Sun • 11:00am • Field 4
Georgia Tech	0
North Carolina	2

== All tournament teams ==
Note: only players on teams in the semifinals were eligible.

=== Men's ===
Name	Team
Stephan Ryan (MVP)	North Carolina
Willem Kelson (Best Goalie)	North Carolina
Francis Boafo	App State
Calvin Ryan	North Carolina
Johnathan Makoko	App State

=== Women's ===
Name	Team
Mia Zlade (MVP)	North Carolina
Caroline Walton (Best Goalie)	North Carolina
Camille Knudstrep	North Carolina
Peyton Warrick	Georgia Tech
Emily Glesser	Vanderbilt
Hope Ingram	North Carolina

== National Championship performance ==
=== Men's ===
Team	Qualification	App	Last bid	Result
North Carolina	Tournament champion	16th	2019	Semifinalist (1–1 a.e.t | 7–8 pen. vs Texas)
Appalachian State	Highest RPI remaining teams	1st	Never	Consolation quarterfinalist (0–6 vs Colorado State)
UCF	2nd highest RPI remaining teams	4th	2016	Sweet 16 (0–2 vs Texas)
JMU	National wildcard	3rd	1997	Consolation quarterfinalist (2–4 vs UConn)

=== Women's ===
Team	Qualification	App	Last bid	Result
North Carolina	Tournament champion	16th	2019	Runners-up (0–1 vs Penn State)
Georgia Tech	Highest RPI remaining teams	1st	Never	Sweet 16 (1–2 vs Cal Poly)
Florida	2nd highest RPI remaining teams	16th	2017	Quarterfinalist (0–1 vs Cal Poly)
Virginia	National wildcard	11th	2018	Consolation semifinalist (0–1 vs Washington)
