= 2019 SCSA Regional Tournament =

- Association: NIRSA
- League: Southeast Collegiate Soccer Alliance
- Sport: Soccer
- Site: Glover Park; Richmond, VA
- Duration: October 25–27, 2019
- Teams: 12 (men's); 8 (women's)

Men's Championship Division
- Score: 1–1 (a.e.t.) (PKs)
- Champion: Florida State (2nd title, 2nd title game)
- Runners-up: North Carolina (3rd title game)
- Season MVP: Michael Seng (Florida State)

Women's Championship Division
- Score: 1–0
- Champion: Virginia Tech (1st title, 6th title game)
- Runners-up: Clemson (1st title game)
- Season MVP: Elizabeth Mondloch (Virginia Tech)

Southeast Collegiate Soccer Alliance seasons
- ← 2018 2021

The 2019 Southeast Collegiate Soccer Alliance Regional Tournament was the 10th edition of the Southeast Collegiate Soccer Alliance's postseason club soccer tournament, which was held at Glover Park in Richmond, Virginia, from October 25–27, 2019. A tournament was held for each the men's and women's division, with each tournament champion receiving an automatic bid to the 2019 NIRSA National Soccer Championship's championship division. The remaining 2 of NIRSA Region II's automatic bids for each division were given out based on RPI, with a special consideration to this tournament's performance. With only 20 teams, this was the lowest number of teams the SCSA has invited to the regional tournament

== Format ==
The tournament consisted of 8 women's teams and 12 men's teams. Each divisional champion received an automatic bid (6 for the women and 8 for the men) with the remaining wild card teams being the next highest RPI ranked teams that had not already qualified. Teams were divided into groups based on RPI.

For the men's division group stage, the 12 teams were split into three groups of four teams each. Each team played every other team in their group meaning a total of 6 games were played within a group. The top two teams from each group advanced to the knockout round, with the best two teams receiving a bye to the semi-finals.

For the women's division group stage, the 8 teams were split into two groups of four teams each. Each team played every other team in their group meaning a total of 6 games were played within a group. The top two teams from each group advanced to the semi-finals.

Pool play games were two 40-minute halves, separated by a seven-minute halftime and utilized the three points for a win system. After pool play, the two highest ranked teams from each group advanced to their respective gender division's knockout stage.

Tie-breaking criteria for group play
The ranking of teams in each group was based on the following criteria in order:
1. Highest number of points
2. Winner of head-to-head competition
3. Greatest goal difference
  - Maximum ± 5 goal difference per match
4. Most goals scored
5. Most shutouts

In a tie-breaking scenario involving more than 2 teams, the tie-breaker procedure would begin. If one team is identified as different and both remaining teams are still tied, the procedure is restarted.

If a tie still remained after the first 5 criteria, the following was used to break a tie:

1. NCAA kicks from the mark
  - If there was a three-way tie, a coin-flip would be conducted. The two teams that chose the same outcome would compete in kicks from the mark between each other. The winner would compete with the last remaining team in kicks from the mark
  - If there's a four-way tie, a drawing of lots would be conducted

Knockout stage games also consisted of two 40-minute halves. The quarterfinals were separated by a seven-minute halftime while the semifinals and finals had a ten minute halftime. Knockout stage games needed to declare a winner. If a knockout-stage game was tied at the end of regulation, overtime would begin. Overtime consisted of one, 15-minute, golden-goal period. If still tied after overtime, kicks from the mark would determine the winner.

== Participants ==
=== Men's ===
Divisional champions
Division	Team	Appearance	Last bid
Atlantic North	North Carolina	10th	2018
Mountain East	Virginia	9th	2018
Coastal Plains	UCF	8th	2018
Atlantic South	Clemson	7th	2018
Gulf Coast	Auburn	5th	2016
Coastal	USF	3rd	2013
Mountain West	NKU	2nd	2018
Central	Kennesaw State	1st	Never

At-large bids
Division	Team	Appearance	Last bid
Coastal Plains	Florida	9th	2018
Central	Georgia Tech	5th	2018
Coastal Plains	Florida State	4th	2016
Gulf Coast	Alabama	3rd	2017

=== Women's ===
Divisional champions
Division	Team	Appearance	Last bid
Florida	Florida	10th	2018
Northeast	North Carolina	10th	2018
North	Virginia Tech	10th	2018
Southeast	Clemson	8th	2018
Northwest	Vanderbilt	6th	2018
Southwest	Georgia Tech	3rd	2018

At-large bids
Division	Team	Appearance	Last bid
Northeast	NC State	8th	2018
North	JMU	1st	Never

== Group stage ==
Note: Scores obtained through SCSA's Twitter, however uncited because it's a primary source and generally unreliable.

=== Men's ===
Group A
Pos	Team	Pld	W	D	L	GF	GA	GD	Pts	Qualification	Seed
1	Kennesaw State	3	3	0	0	7	3	+4	9	Qualification for semi-finals	2
2	Florida	3	2	0	1	9	2	+6	6	Qualification for first round	4
3	NKU	3	1	0	2	7	12	−4	3		9
4	Alabama	3	0	0	3	3	9	−6	0		10

9:30pm EST	Florida	2–0	Alabama	Turf 3
Fri, October 25				Stadium: Glover Park; Richmond, VA

9:30pm EST	Kennesaw State	3–2	NKU	Turf 4
Fri, October 25				Stadium: Glover Park; Richmond, VA

10:45am EST	NKU	1–7	Florida	Turf 3
Sat, October 26				Stadium: Glover Park; Richmond, VA

10:45am EST	Alabama	1–3	Kennesaw State	Turf 4
Sat, October 26				Stadium: Glover Park; Richmond, VA

2:15pm EST	Florida	0–1	Kennesaw State	Turf 5
Sat, October 26				Stadium: Glover Park; Richmond, VA

2:15pm EST	NKU	4–2	Alabama	Turf 2
Sat, October 26				Stadium: Glover Park; Richmond, VA

Group B
Pos	Team	Pld	W	D	L	GF	GA	GD	Pts	Qualification	Seed
1	Florida State	3	2	1	0	7	2	+5	7	Qualification for first round	3
2	Virginia	3	2	0	1	6	3	+3	6	Qualification for first round	6
3	Georgia Tech	3	1	1	0	8	3	+4	4		7
4	Auburn	3	0	0	3	0	13	−12	0		12

7:45pm EST	Georgia Tech	1–2	Virginia	Turf 5
Fri, October 25				Stadium: Glover Park; Richmond, VA

7:45pm EST	Auburn	0–4	Florida State	Turf 2
Sat, October 26				Stadium: Glover Park; Richmond, VA

9:00am EST	Virginia	3–0	Auburn	Turf 3
Sat, October 26				Stadium: Glover Park; Richmond, VA

9:00am EST	Florida State	1–1	Georgia Tech	Turf 2
Sat, October 26				Stadium: Glover Park; Richmond, VA

12:30pm EST	Georgia Tech	6–0	Auburn	Turf 3
Sat, October 26				Stadium: Glover Park; Richmond, VA

12:30pm EST	Florida State	2–1	Virginia	Turf 4
Sat, October 26				Stadium: Glover Park; Richmond, VA

Group C
Pos	Team	Pld	W	D	L	GF	GA	GD	Pts	Qualification	Seed
1	North Carolina	3	3	0	0	8	0	+8	9	Qualification for semi-finals	1
2	Clemson	3	2	0	1	6	1	+5	6	Qualification for first round	5
3	UCF	3	1	0	2	3	6	−3	3		8
4	USF	3	0	0	3	1	11	−10	0		11

7:45pm EST	USF	1–3	UCF	Turf 3
Fri, October 25				Stadium: Glover Park; Richmond, VA

7:45pm EST	Clemson	0–1	North Carolina	Turf 4
Sat, October 26				Stadium: Glover Park; Richmond, VA

9:00am EST	UCF	0–3	Clemson	Turf 5
Sat, October 26				Stadium: Glover Park; Richmond, VA

9:00am EST	North Carolina	5–0	USF	Turf 2
Sat, October 26				Stadium: Glover Park; Richmond, VA

2:15pm EST	USF	0–3	Clemson	Turf 3
Sat, October 26				Stadium: Glover Park; Richmond, VA

2:15pm EST	North Carolina	2–0	UCF	Turf 4
Sat, October 26				Stadium: Glover Park; Richmond, VA

=== Women's ===
Group A
Pos	Team	Pld	W	D	L	GF	GA	GD	Pts	Qualification
1	Clemson	3	2	1	0	2	0	+2	7	Advanced to knockout stage
2	North Carolina	3	2	0	1	4	2	+2	6	Advanced to knockout stage
3	Vanderbilt	3	1	0	2	4	5	−1	3	
4	Georgia Tech	3	0	1	2	2	5	−3	1	

6:00pm EST	North Carolina	2–1	Vanderbilt	Turf 2
Fri, October 25				Stadium: Glover Park; Richmond, VA

9:30pm EST	Clemson	0–0	Georgia Tech	Turf 2
Sat, October 26				Stadium: Glover Park; Richmond, VA

10:45am EST	Georgia Tech	0–2	North Carolina	Turf 5
Sat, October 26				Stadium: Glover Park; Richmond, VA

10:45am EST	Vanderbilt	0–1	Clemson	Turf 2
Sat, October 26				Stadium: Glover Park; Richmond, VA

4:00pm EST	Georgia Tech	2–3	Vanderbilt	Turf 5
Sat, October 26				Stadium: Glover Park; Richmond, VA

4:00pm EST	Clemson	1–0	North Carolina	Turf 3
Sat, October 26				Stadium: Glover Park; Richmond, VA

Group B
Pos	Team	Pld	W	D	L	GF	GA	GD	Pts	Qualification
1	Virginia Tech	3	3	0	0	7	1	+6	9	Advanced to knockout stage
2	JMU	3	2	0	1	4	2	+2	6	Advanced to knockout stage
3	NC State	3	1	0	2	3	5	−2	3	
4	Florida	3	0	0	3	1	7	−6	0	

6:00pm EST	NC State	0–2	JMU	Turf 3
Fri, October 25				Stadium: Glover Park; Richmond, VA

9:30pm EST	Florida	0–3	Virginia Tech	Turf 5
Sat, October 26				Stadium: Glover Park; Richmond, VA

12:30pm EST	Virginia Tech	2–1	NC State	Turf 5
Sat, October 26				Stadium: Glover Park; Richmond, VA

12:30pm EST	JMU	2–0	Florida	Turf 2
Sat, October 26				Stadium: Glover Park; Richmond, VA

4:00pm EST	NC State	2–1	Florida	Turf 2
Sat, October 26				Stadium: Glover Park; Richmond, VA

4:00pm EST	Virginia Tech	2–0	JMU	Turf 4
Sat, October 26				Stadium: Glover Park; Richmond, VA

== Tournament bracket ==
Note: Scores obtained through SCSA's Twitter, however uncited because it's a primary source and generally unreliable.

=== Men's ===
First round
Sat • 5:45pm • Turf 3
4	Florida	2
5	Clemson	1
Sat • 5:45pm • Turf 2
3	Florida State	5
6	Virginia	1

Semifinals
Sun • 9:00am • Turf 2
North Carolina	2
Florida	0
Sun • 9:00am • Turf 4
Kennesaw State	0
Florida State	2

Final
Sun • 12:00pm • Turf 3
North Carolina	1
Florida State (a.e.t.) (pen.)	1

=== Women's ===
Semifinals
Sun • 9:00am • Turf 5
Clemson (a.e.t.) (pen.)	1
JMU	1
Sun • 9:00am • Turf 3
Virginia Tech (a.e.t.) (pen.)	1
North Carolina	1

Final
Sun • 12:00pm • Turf 2
Clemson	0
Virginia Tech	1

== All tournament teams ==
Note: only players on teams in the semifinals were eligible.

=== Men's ===
Name	Team
Michael Seng (MVP)	Florida State
Jeff Sweeney (Best goalie)	Florida State
AJ Jallow	Kennesaw State
Robert Atkinson	North Carolina
Stephen Ryan	North Carolina
Patrick Rye	Florida State
Daniel Villa	Florida State

=== Women's ===
Name	Team
Elizabeth Mondloch (MVP)	Virginia Tech
Caroline Viscovich (Best goalie)	Virginia Tech
Maddie Malooy	JMU
Laura Sullivan	North Carolina
Jessica Schifer	Clemson
Mikaela Schifer	Clemson
Abby Dolgos	Virginia Tech
Kellie Hoffman	Virginia Tech

== National Championship performance ==
=== Men's ===
Team	Qualification	App	Last bid	Result
Florida State	Tournament champion	3rd	2015	Sweet 16 (2–2 a.e.t. | 2–4 pen. vs Michigan)
Florida	Highest RPI remaining teams	13th	2018	Sweet 16 (2–3 a.e.t. vs USC)
North Carolina	2nd highest RPI remaining teams	15th	2018	Semifinalist (0–3 vs BYU)

=== Women's ===
Team	Qualification	App	Last bid	Result
Virginia Tech	Tournament champion	15th	2017	Sweet 16 (1–2 vs Michigan)
Clemson	Highest RPI remaining teams	6th	2018	Sweet 16 (1–3 vs UCLA)
North Carolina	2nd highest RPI remaining teams	15th	2018	Consolation runners-up (0–1 vs Gonzaga)
JMU	National wildcard	11th	2007	Sweet 16 (0–0 a.e.t. | 1–3 pen. vs UCSB)
