= 2014 SCSA Regional Tournament =

- Association: NIRSA
- League: Southeast Collegiate Soccer Alliance
- Sport: Soccer
- Site: BB&T Soccer Park; Winston-Salem, North Carolina
- Duration: Oct. 31–Nov. 2, 2014
- Number of teams: 16 (men's); 12 (women's)

Men's Championship Division
- Score: 2–1
- Champion: Virginia Tech (2nd title, 2nd title game)
- Runners-up: UCF (1st title game)
- Season MVP: J. Pace (Virginia Tech)

Women's Championship Division
- Score: 4–1
- Champion: North Carolina (2nd title, 2nd title game)
- Runners-up: NC State (1st title game)
- Season MVP: Rachel Baum (North Carolina)

Southeast Collegiate Soccer Alliance seasons
- ← 2013 2015 →

The 2014 Southeast Collegiate Soccer Alliance Regional Tournament was the 5th edition of the Southeast Collegiate Soccer Alliance's postseason club soccer tournament, which was held at BB&T Soccer Park in Winston-Salem, North Carolina, from October 31 – November 2, 2014. A tournament was held for each the men's and women's division, with each tournament champion receiving an automatic bid to the 2014 NIRSA National Soccer Championship's championship division. The remaining 2 of NIRSA Region II's automatic bids for each division were given out based on RPI, with a special consideration to this tournament's performance. Rain caused no games to be played Saturday, meaning all the teams, with one game played, advanced to the knockout round, the entirety of which was to be played Sunday.

== Format ==
The tournament consisted of twelve women's teams and sixteen men's teams. Each divisional champion received an automatic bid (6 for the women and 8 for the men) with the remaining wild card teams being the next highest RPI ranked teams that had not already qualified. Teams were divided into groups based on RPI.

For the men's division group stage, the 16 teams were split into four groups of four teams each. Each team played every other team in their group meaning a total of 6 games were played within a group. The top two teams from each group advanced to the knockout round.

For the women's division group stage, the 12 teams were split into three groups of four teams each. Each team played every other team in their group meaning a total of 6 games were played within a group. The top two teams from each group advanced to the semi-finals, with the best two teams across all pools receiving a bye to the semifinals.

== Participants ==
=== Men's ===
Automatic bids
Division	Team	Appearance	Last bid
Coastal	UCF	4th	2013
Central	Georgia	4th	2013
Gulf Coast	Auburn	3rd	2013
Mountain West	Eastern Kentucky	1st	Never
Mountain East	Virginia	4th	2013
Atlantic North	Elon	1st	Never
Atlantic South	South Carolina	2nd	2012
Coastal Plains	Florida State	1st	Never

At-large bids
Division	Team	Appearance	Last bid
Mountain West	Kentucky	1st	Never
Coastal Plains	Florida	5th	2013
Coastal	Florida Gulf Coast	2nd	2012
Central	Georgia College	2nd	2013
Mountain East	JMU	1st	Never
Atlantic North	North Carolina	5th	2013
Atlantic South	UNC-Wilmington	1st	Never
Mountain East	Virginia Tech	3rd	2013

=== Women's ===
Automatic bids
Division	Team	Appearance	Last bid
North	Virginia	5th	2013
Northwest	Vanderbilt	2nd	2013
Northeast	North Carolina	5th	2013
Southeast	Clemson	3rd	2013
Southwest	Auburn	3rd	2013
Florida	Florida State	1st	Never

At-large bids
Division	Team	Appearance	Last bid
North	App State	2nd	2013
Northeast	East Carolina	2nd	2012
Florida	Florida	5th	2013
Northeast	NC State	3rd	2013
Florida	UCF	1st	Never
North	Virginia Tech	5th	2013

== Group stage ==
=== Men's ===
Group A
Pos	Team	Pld	W	D	L	GF	GA	GD	Pts	Qualification
1	Florida State	1	1	0	0	2	1	+1	3	Advanced to knockout stage
2	Kentucky	1	1	0	0	2	1	+1	3	Advanced to knockout stage
3	Florida Gulf Coast	1	0	0	1	1	2	−1	0	Advanced to knockout stage
4	Georgia College	1	0	0	1	1	2	−1	0	Advanced to knockout stage

Scores

9:30pm EST	Florida State	2–1	Georgia College	Field 1
Fri, October 31				Stadium: BB&T Soccer Park; Winston-Salem, NC

9:30pm EST	Kentucky	2–1	Florida Gulf Coast	Field 2
Fri, October 31				Stadium: BB&T Soccer Park; Winston-Salem, NC

Remainder of games cancelled (rain)

Group B
Pos	Team	Pld	W	D	L	GF	GA	GD	Pts	Qualification
1	JMU	1	1	0	0	5	0	+5	3	Advanced to knockout stage
2	Auburn	1	1	0	0	3	0	+3	3	Advanced to knockout stage
3	UCF	1	0	0	1	0	3	−3	0	Advanced to knockout stage
4	Eastern Kentucky	1	0	0	1	0	5	−5	0	Advanced to knockout stage

Scores

7:45pm EST	JMU	5–0	EKU	Field 4
Fri, October 31				Stadium: BB&T Soccer Park; Winston-Salem, NC

9:30pm EST	Auburn	3–0	UCF	Field 3
Fri, October 31				Stadium: BB&T Soccer Park; Winston-Salem, NC

Remainder of games cancelled (rain)

Pos	Team	Pld	W	D	L	GF	GA	GD	Pts	Qualification
1	Virginia Tech	1	1	0	0	4	2	+2	3	Advanced to knockout stage
2	Florida	1	1	0	0	2	0	+2	3	Advanced to knockout stage
3	North Carolina	1	0	0	1	2	4	−2	0	Advanced to knockout stage
4	UNC-Wilmington	1	0	0	1	0	2	−2	0	Advanced to knockout stage

Scores

6:00pm EST	Virginia Tech	4–2	North Carolina	Field 1
Fri, October 31				Stadium: BB&T Soccer Park; Winston-Salem, NC

7:45pm EST	Florida	2–0	UNC-Wilmington	Field 5
Fri, October 31				Stadium: BB&T Soccer Park; Winston-Salem, NC

Remainder of games cancelled (rain)

Group D
Pos	Team	Pld	W	D	L	GF	GA	GD	Pts	Qualification
1	South Carolina	1	1	0	0	2	1	+1	3	Advanced to knockout stage
2	Georgia	1	0	1	0	1	1	0	1	Advanced to knockout stage
3	Virginia	1	0	1	0	1	1	0	1	Advanced to knockout stage
4	Elon	1	0	0	1	1	2	−1	0	Advanced to knockout stage

Scores

6:00pm EST	South Carolina	2–1	Elon	Field 2
Fri, October 31				Stadium: BB&T Soccer Park; Winston-Salem, NC

6:00pm EST	Virginia	1–1	Georgia	Field 3
Fri, October 31				Stadium: BB&T Soccer Park; Winston-Salem, NC

Remainder of games cancelled (rain)

=== Women's ===
Group A
Pos	Team	Pld	W	D	L	GF	GA	GD	Pts	Qualification
1	NC State	1	1	0	0	3	0	+3	3	Advanced to knockout stage
2	Virginia Tech	1	1	0	0	2	1	+1	3	Advanced to knockout stage
3	Auburn	1	0	0	1	1	2	−1	0	Advanced to knockout stage
4	Florida State	1	0	0	1	0	3	−3	0	Advanced to knockout stage

7:45pm EST	NC State	3–0	East Carolina	Field 10
Fri, October 31				Stadium: BB&T Soccer Park; Winston-Salem, NC

9:30pm EST	Virginia Tech	2–1	Auburn	Field 5
Fri, October 31				Stadium: BB&T Soccer Park; Winston-Salem, NC

Remainder of games cancelled (rain)

Pos	Team	Pld	W	D	L	GF	GA	GD	Pts	Qualification
1	Virginia	1	1	0	0	2	1	+1	3	Advanced to knockout stage
2	UCF	1	0	1	0	0	0	0	1	Advanced to knockout stage
3	Vanderbilt	1	0	1	0	0	0	0	1	Advanced to knockout stage
4	East Carolina	1	0	0	1	1	2	−1	0	Advanced to knockout stage

7:45pm EST	Virginia	2–1	East Carolina	Field 3
Fri, October 31				Stadium: BB&T Soccer Park; Winston-Salem, NC

7:45pm EST	Vanderbilt	0–0	UCF	Field 3
Fri, October 31				Stadium: BB&T Soccer Park; Winston-Salem, NC

Remainder of games cancelled (rain)

Pos	Team	Pld	W	D	L	GF	GA	GD	Pts	Qualification
1	North Carolina	1	1	0	0	3	1	+2	3	Advanced to knockout stage
2	Florida	1	1	0	0	2	1	+1	3	Advanced to knockout stage
3	Clemson	1	0	0	1	1	2	−1	0	Advanced to knockout stage
4	App State	1	0	0	1	1	3	−2	0	Advanced to knockout stage

6:00pm EST	North Carolina	3–1	App State	Field 4
Fri, October 31				Stadium: BB&T Soccer Park; Winston-Salem, NC

9:30pm EST	Florida	2–1	Clemson	Field 4
Fri, October 31				Stadium: BB&T Soccer Park; Winston-Salem, NC

Remainder of games cancelled (rain)

== Tournament bracket ==
=== Men's ===
Sweet 16
Sun • 8:00am • Field 1
Florida State	1
Florida Gulf Coast	0
Sun • 8:00am • Field 2
North Carolina	1
UNC-Wilmington	0
Sun • 8:00am • Field 3
Virginia Tech	1
Florida	0
Sun • 8:00am • Field 4
South Carolina	0
Georgia	1
Sun • 8:00am • Field 5
Virginia	1
Elon	0
Sun • 8:00am • Field 9
JMU	1
Auburn	0
Sun • 8:00am • Field 10
UCF	1
EKU	0
Sun • 8:00am • Field 11
Kentucky (a.e.t.)	3
Georgia College	2

Quarterfinals
Sun • 10:00am • Field 1
Florida State	1
North Carolina	0
Sun • 10:00am • Field 2
Virginia Tech (pen.)	1
Georgia	0
Sun • 10:00am • Field 3
Virginia	1
JMU	0
Sun • 10:00am • Field 4
UCF	1
Kentucky	0

Semifinals
Sun • 12:00pm • Field 1
Florida State	0
Virginia Tech (pen.)	1
Sun • 12:00pm • Field 2
Virginia	0
UCF	1

Final
Sun • 2:00pm • Field 1
Virginia Tech	2
UCF	1

=== Women's ===
First round
Sun • 8:00am • Field 6
Auburn	1
Clemson	0
Sun • 8:00am • Field 7
Virginia	1
App State	0
Sun • 8:00am • Field 8
East Carolina	0
Virginia Tech	1
Sun • 8:00am • Field 12
Florida	0
Florida State	1

Quarterfinals
Sun • 10:00am • Field 9
North Carolina	5
Auburn	0
Sun • 10:00am • Field 10
Vanderbilt (pen.)	1
Virginia	0
Sun • 10:00am • Field 11
NC State	1
Virginia Tech	0
Sun • 10:00am • Field 12
UCF	0
Florida State	1

Semifinals
Sun • 12:00pm • Field 3
North Carolina	9
Vanderbilt	0
Sun • 12:00pm • Field 4
NC State	2
Florida State	1

Final
Sun • 2:00pm • Field 2
North Carolina	4
NC State	1

== National Championship performance ==
=== Men's ===
Team	Qualification	App	Last bid	Result
Virginia Tech	Tournament champion	7th	2013	Quarterfinalist (0–1 vs Ohio State)
Florida	Highest RPI remaining teams	9th	2013	Sweet 16 (1–2 vs Ohio State)
Florida State	2nd highest RPI remaining teams	1st	Never	Sweet 16 (0–5 vs Texas A&M)
Virginia	National Wildcard	7th	2010	Sweet 16 (3–3 | 3–4 penalties vs Michigan State)

=== Women's ===
Team	Qualification	App	Last bid	Result
North Carolina	Tournament champion	11th	2013	Quarterfinalist (0–2 vs Miami (OH))
NC State	Highest RPI remaining teams	1st	Never	Consolation quarterfinalist (2–3 vs USC)
Virginia	2nd highest RPI remaining teams	8th	2012	Sweet 16 (1–2 a.e.t. vs Illinois)
Florida	National Wildcard	12th	2013	Consolation champion
Florida State	National Wildcard	2nd	2000	Consolation semifinalist (0–0 | 2–4 penalties vs Penn State)

== Notes ==
- Many details obtained through SCSA's Twitter, however generally unreliable and therefore uncited
