= 2015 SCSA Regional Tournament =

- Association: NIRSA
- League: Southeast Collegiate Soccer Alliance
- Sport: Soccer
- Site: Jonesville Soccer Complex; Gainesville, Florida
- Duration: Oct. 30–Nov. 1, 2015
- Number of teams: 16 (men's); 12 (women's)

Men's Championship Division
- Score: 1–0
- Champion: Florida State (1st title, 1st title game)
- Runners-up: Virginia Tech (3rd title game)
- Season MVP: Keegan Ball (Florida State)

Women's Championship Division
- Score: 2–1
- Champion: North Carolina (3rd title, 3rd title game)
- Runners-up: NC State (5th title game)
- Season MVP: Courtney Johnson (North Carolina)

Southeast Collegiate Soccer Alliance seasons
- ← 2014 2016 →

The 2015 Southeast Collegiate Soccer Alliance Regional Tournament was the 6th edition of the Southeast Collegiate Soccer Alliance's postseason club soccer tournament, which was held at Jonesville Soccer Complex in Gainesville, Florida, from October 30 – November 1, 2015. A tournament was held for each the men's and women's division, with each tournament champion receiving an automatic bid to the 2015 NIRSA National Soccer Championship's championship division. The remaining 2 of NIRSA Region II's automatic bids for each division were given out based on RPI, with a special consideration to this tournament's performance.

== Format ==
The tournament consisted of twelve women’s teams and sixteen men’s teams. Each divisional champion received an automatic bid (6 for the women and 8 for the men) with the remaining wild card teams being the next highest RPI ranked teams that had not already qualified. Teams were divided into groups based on RPI.

For the men's division group stage, the 16 teams were split into four groups of four teams each. Each team played every other team in their group meaning a total of 6 games were played within a group. The top two teams from each group advanced to the knockout round.

For the women's division group stage, the 12 teams were split into three groups of four teams each. Each team played every other team in their group meaning a total of 6 games were played within a group. The top two teams from each group advanced to the semi-finals, with the best two teams across all pools receiving a bye to the semifinals.

== Participants ==
=== Men's ===
Divisional champions
Division	Team	Appearance	Last bid
Atlantic North	Duke	2nd	2012
Atlantic South	Appalachian State	1st	Never
Coastal	Lynn	1st	Never
Coastal Plains	Florida State	2nd	2014
Central	Georgia College	3rd	2014
Gulf Coast	Alabama	1st	Never
Mountain East	Virginia	5th	2014
Mountain West	MTSU	1st	Never

At-large bids
Team	Appearance	Last bid
Clemson	3rd	2013
Elon	2nd	2014
Georgia Tech	1st	Never
NC State	2nd	2012
North Carolina	6th	2014
UCF	5th	2014
UNC-Wilmington	2nd	2014
Virginia Tech	4th	2014

=== Women's ===
Divisional champions
Division	Team	Appearance	Last bid
Florida	Florida	6th	2014
North	Virginia Tech	6th	2014
Northeast	North Carolina	6th	2014
Northwest	Vanderbilt	3rd	2014
Southeast	Clemson	4th	2014
Southwest	Georgia	3rd	2013

At-large bids
Team	Appearance	Last bid
Appalachian State	3rd	2014
East Carolina	3rd	2014
Florida State	2nd	2014
NC State	4th	2014
UCF	2nd	2014
Virginia	6th	2014

== Group stage ==
=== Men's ===
Pos	Team	Pld	W	D	L	GF	GA	GD	Pts	Qualification
1	North Carolina	3	2	1	0	5	2	+3	7	Advanced to knockout stage
2	Virginia	3	1	1	1	4	3	+1	4	Advanced to knockout stage
3	UNC-Wilmington	3	1	1	1	4	5	−1	4	
4	Georgia Tech	3	0	1	2	3	6	−3	1	

9:30pm EST	Virginia	1–1	UNC-Wilmington	Field 1
Fri, October 30				Stadium: Jonesville Soccer Complex; Gainesville, Florida

9:30pm EST	Georgia Tech	1–1	North Carolina	Field 3
Fri, October 30				Stadium: Jonesville Soccer Complex; Gainesville, Florida

9:45am EST	Georgia Tech	0–2	Virginia	Field 3
Sat, October 31				Stadium: Jonesville Soccer Complex; Gainesville, Florida

9:45am EST	UNC-Wilmington	0–2	North Carolina	Field 5
Sat, October 31				Stadium: Jonesville Soccer Complex; Gainesville, Florida

3:00pm EST	UNC-Wilmington	3–2	Georgia Tech	Field 1
Sat, October 31				Stadium: Jonesville Soccer Complex; Gainesville, Florida

3:00pm EST	North Carolina	2–1	Virginia	Field 3
Sat, October 31				Stadium: Jonesville Soccer Complex; Gainesville, Florida

Pos	Team	Pld	W	D	L	GF	GA	GD	Pts	Qualification
1	UCF	3	3	0	0	7	0	+7	9	Advanced to knockout stage
2	Florida State	3	1	1	1	2	1	+1	4	Advanced to knockout stage
3	Elon	3	1	0	2	2	3	−1	3	
4	Clemson	3	0	1	2	0	7	−7	1	

4:15pm EST	Florida State	0–1	UCF	Field 3
Fri, October 30				Stadium: Jonesville Soccer Complex; Gainesville, Florida

7:45pm EST	Elon	2–0	Clemson	Field 3
Fri, October 30				Stadium: Jonesville Soccer Complex; Gainesville, Florida

9:45am EST	Florida State	2–0	Elon	Field 4
Sat, October 31				Stadium: Jonesville Soccer Complex; Gainesville, Florida

9:45am EST	Clemson	0–5	UCF	Field 6
Sat, October 31				Stadium: Jonesville Soccer Complex; Gainesville, Florida

3:00pm EST	Clemson	0–0	Florida State	Field 4
Sat, October 31				Stadium: Jonesville Soccer Complex; Gainesville, Florida

3:00pm EST	UCF	1–0	Elon	Field 5
Sat, October 31				Stadium: Jonesville Soccer Complex; Gainesville, Florida

Pos	Team	Pld	W	D	L	GF	GA	GD	Pts	Qualification
1	Lynn	3	3	0	0	10	4	+6	9	Advanced to knockout stage
2	Duke	3	1	1	1	7	3	+4	4	Advanced to knockout stage
3	Alabama	3	1	1	1	6	6	0	4	
4	Georgia College	3	0	0	3	5	15	−10	0	

6:00pm EST	Duke	1–2	Lynn	Field 6
Fri, October 30				Stadium: Jonesville Soccer Complex; Gainesville, Florida

7:45pm EST	Georgia College	2–5	Alabama	Field 6
Fri, October 30				Stadium: Jonesville Soccer Complex; Gainesville, Florida

8:00am EST	Georgia College	0–5	Duke	Field 5
Sat, October 31				Stadium: Jonesville Soccer Complex; Gainesville, Florida

8:00am EST	Lynn	3–0	Alabama	Field 6
Sat, October 31				Stadium: Jonesville Soccer Complex; Gainesville, Florida

1:15pm EST	Lynn	5–3	Georgia College	Field 5
Sat, October 31				Stadium: Jonesville Soccer Complex; Gainesville, Florida

1:15pm EST	Alabama	1–1	Duke	Field 6
Sat, October 31				Stadium: Jonesville Soccer Complex; Gainesville, Florida

Pos	Team	Pld	W	D	L	GF	GA	GD	Pts	Qualification
1	Virginia Tech	3	2	0	1	4	1	+3	6	Advanced to knockout stage
2	App State	3	1	1	1	3	3	0	4	Advanced to knockout stage
3	MTSU	3	1	1	1	2	2	0	4	
4	NC State	3	1	0	2	2	5	−3	3	

6:00pm EST	MTSU	1–0	NC State	Field 3
Fri, October 30				Stadium: Jonesville Soccer Complex; Gainesville, Florida

6:00pm EST	App State	1–0	Virginia Tech	Field 2
Fri, October 30				Stadium: Jonesville Soccer Complex; Gainesville, Florida

8:00am EST	MTSU	1–1	App State	Field 3
Sat, October 31				Stadium: Jonesville Soccer Complex; Gainesville, Florida

8:00am EST	Virginia Tech	3–0	NC State	Field 2
Sat, October 31				Stadium: Jonesville Soccer Complex; Gainesville, Florida

1:15pm EST	Virginia Tech	1–0	MTSU	Field 3
Sat, October 31				Stadium: Jonesville Soccer Complex; Gainesville, Florida

1:15pm EST	NC State	2–1	App State	Field 4
Sat, October 31				Stadium: Jonesville Soccer Complex; Gainesville, Florida

=== Women's ===
Pos	Team	Pld	W	D	L	GF	GA	GD	Pts	Qualification	Seed
1	Florida	3	2	1	0	6	2	+4	7	Advanced to first round	3
2	NC State	3	1	1	1	2	3	−1	4	Advanced to first round	6
3	Georgia	3	0	3	0	2	2	0	3		7
4	Appalachian State	3	0	1	2	1	4	−3	1		11

4:15pm EST	Florida	1–1	Georgia	Field 5
Fri, October 30				Stadium: Jonesville Soccer Complex; Gainesville, Florida

7:45pm EST	NC State	1–0	App State	Field 2
Fri, October 30				Stadium: Jonesville Soccer Complex; Gainesville, Florida

8:00am EST	NC State	0–2	Florida	Field 1
Sat, October 31				Stadium: Jonesville Soccer Complex; Gainesville, Florida

9:45am EST	Georgia	0–0	App State	Field 2
Sat, October 31				Stadium: Jonesville Soccer Complex; Gainesville, Florida

3:00pm EST	Georgia	1–1	NC State	Field 2
Sat, October 31				Stadium: Jonesville Soccer Complex; Gainesville, Florida

4:45pm EST	App State	1–3	Florida	Field 5
Sat, October 31				Stadium: Jonesville Soccer Complex; Gainesville, Florida

Pos	Team	Pld	W	D	L	GF	GA	GD	Pts	Qualification	Seed
1	Virginia Tech	3	3	0	0	11	1	+10	9	Advanced to semifinals	1
2	Vanderbilt	3	2	0	1	6	5	+1	6	Advanced to first round	4
3	UCF	3	1	0	2	3	6	−3	3		8
4	East Carolina	3	0	0	3	1	9	−8	0		12

6:00pm EST	Virginia Tech	3–0	UCF	Field 1
Fri, October 30				Stadium: Jonesville Soccer Complex; Gainesville, Florida

9:30pm EST	Vanderbilt	3–0	East Carolina	Field 2
Fri, October 30				Stadium: Jonesville Soccer Complex; Gainesville, Florida

11:30am EST	Vanderbilt	1–4	Virginia Tech	Field 2
Sat, October 31				Stadium: Jonesville Soccer Complex; Gainesville, Florida

11:30am EST	UCF	2–1	East Carolina	Field 1
Sat, October 31				Stadium: Jonesville Soccer Complex; Gainesville, Florida

4:45pm EST	UCF	1–2	Vanderbilt	Field 2
Sat, October 31				Stadium: Jonesville Soccer Complex; Gainesville, Florida

4:45pm EST	East Carolina	0–4	Virginia Tech	Field 3
Sat, October 31				Stadium: Jonesville Soccer Complex; Gainesville, Florida

Pos	Team	Pld	W	D	L	GF	GA	GD	Pts	Qualification	Seed
1	North Carolina	3	3	0	0	5	0	+5	9	Advanced to semifinals	2
2	Florida State	3	1	1	1	5	4	+1	4	Advanced to first round	5
3	Clemson	3	0	2	1	2	5	−3	2		9
4	Virginia	3	0	1	2	3	6	−3	1		10

7:45pm EST	North Carolina	1–0	Florida State	Field 1
Fri, October 30				Stadium: Jonesville Soccer Complex; Gainesville, Florida

9:30pm EST	Clemson	1–1	Virginia	Field 6
Fri, October 30				Stadium: Jonesville Soccer Complex; Gainesville, Florida

11:30am EST	Clemson	0–3	North Carolina	Field 6
Sat, October 31				Stadium: Jonesville Soccer Complex; Gainesville, Florida

11:30am EST	Florida State	4–2	Virginia	Field 4
Sat, October 31				Stadium: Jonesville Soccer Complex; Gainesville, Florida

4:45pm EST	Florida State	1–1	Clemson	Field 1
Sat, October 31				Stadium: Jonesville Soccer Complex; Gainesville, Florida

4:45pm EST	Virginia	0–1	North Carolina	Field 6
Sat, October 31				Stadium: Jonesville Soccer Complex; Gainesville, Florida

== Tournament bracket ==
=== Men's ===
Quarterfinals
Sat • 6:30pm • Field 1
North Carolina	0 (5)
App State (pen.)	0 (6)
Sat • 6:30pm • Field 2
Lynn	2
Florida State (a.e.t.)	3
Sat • 6:30pm • Field 3
UCF	4
Duke	1
Sat • 6:30pm • Field 6
Virginia Tech	1
Virginia	0

Semifinals
Sun • 9:00am • Field 4
App State	1
Florida State	2
Sun • 9:00am • Field 5
UCF	0
Virginia Tech	1

Final
Sun • 12:00pm • Field 1
Florida State	1
Virginia Tech	0

=== Women's ===
First round
Sat • 8:15pm • Field 1
4	Vanderbilt (pen.)	2 (6)
5	Florida State	2 (5)
Sat • 8:15pm • Field 2
3	Florida	3
6	NC State	2

Semifinals
Sun • 9:00am • Field 2
Virginia Tech	1
Vanderbilt	0
Sun • 9:00am • Field 3
North Carolina	1
Florida	0

Final
Sun • 12:00pm • Field 2
Virginia Tech	1
North Carolina	2

== National Championship performance ==
=== Men's ===
Team	Qualification	App	Last bid	Result
Florida State	Tournament champion	2nd	2014	Quarterfinalist (2–3 a.e.t vs Weber State)
UCF	Highest RPI remaining teams	2nd	2010	Quarterfinalist (2–3 a.e.t vs North Carolina)
Virginia Tech	2nd highest RPI remaining teams	8th	2014	Consolation semifinalist (0–5 vs UC-Berkeley)
North Carolina	National wildcard	11th	2011	National champion (2-0 vs Penn State)

=== Women's ===
Team	Qualification	App	Last bid	Result
North Carolina	Tournament champion	11th	2014	Sweet 16 (0–1 vs Michigan State)
Virginia Tech	Highest RPI remaining teams	13th	2013	Semifinalist (2–3 a.e.t. vs Michigan State)
Florida	2nd highest RPI remaining teams	13th	2014	Quarterfinalist (0–2 vs Michigan State)

== Notes ==
- Many details obtained through SCSA's Twitter, however generally unreliable and therefore uncited
