= Southeast Collegiate Soccer Alliance =

- Association: NIRSA
- Sport: Soccer
- Founded: 1995
- Rebranded: 2010
- Commissioners: Shawn Conboy (Men); Laura Shively (Women)
- Website: Official website

Men's
- Most successful club: Virginia Tech (4 titles)
- Current champion: Georgia Tech (1st title, 2nd title game)
- Runners-up: Virginia Tech (6th title game)

Women's
- Most successful club: North Carolina (7 titles)
- Current champion: Tennessee (1st title, 1st title game)
- Runners-up: Virginia Tech (7th title game)

Most recent regional tournament (2025)

The Southeast Collegiate Soccer Alliance (SCSA), also referred to as NIRSA Region II, is a NIRSA-affiliated, structured, divisional play for men's and women's collegiate club soccer programs in the US which seek to qualify for the Region 2 Soccer Tournament which is a qualifier for the NIRSA National Soccer Championships. Region 2 Soccer consists of non-varsity club teams representing accredited colleges and universities from the following states: Alabama, Florida, Georgia, Kentucky, Mississippi, North Carolina, South Carolina, Tennessee, and Virginia. While NIRSA has had an official region 2 for soccer since 1995, the current SCSA wasn't created until 2010.

== History ==
Initially developed to help NIRSA determine the best teams in the nation to send to the national tournament, NIRSA appointed regional coordinators in 1995, the year following the first national tournament. These appointed coordinators were in charge of generating rankings that NIRSA could use to select the teams most deserving of a bid.

For the first 7 years, the region II coordinators used their own ranking system from games that teams played locally. However, coordinators began finding it more and more difficult to accurately rank teams due to the growth in the number of teams. To solve this issue, NIRSA encouraged coordinators to host a regional tournament to not only gauge skill, but to also find teams that were willing, and able, to travel since collegiate clubs generally receive little, to no, funding from the university they represent.

During this time, a separate league began in 1999 called the Southeast Collegiate Soccer League (SCSL) that was exclusively for men's club teams in NIRSA's region II area. Despite not being created by the coordinators NIRSA appointed for the region, this league was still affiliated with NIRSA. Each year, the league hosted an end of season tournament that all teams were required to attend and the winner of the tournament would receive an automatic bid to the national tournament, a system that's currently used by the SCSA. Three years after this, in the 2002 season, NIRSA's region II division began holding a tournament of their own for both men's and women's teams. The first two seasons, the tournaments were on separate weekends, but in 2004 the tournaments fell on the same weekend, forcing teams to choose which one to attend.

Following the 2004 season, in July 2005, it was announced that the league would end due to a lack of communication from participating club teams and no longer host a tournament. After the dissolution, all SCSL clubs were allowed to participate in NIRSA's Region II league and tournament. In 2010, the league was renamed from NIRSA Region II to the current Southeast Collegiate Soccer Alliance.

== Current format ==
=== Regular season ===
The SCSA is currently divided into 6 divisions for women's teams and 8 divisions for the men's teams. Each team must play at least 6 games against current SCSA teams to be eligible for the end of season tournament.

To help decide who gets to attend the regional tournament, the winner of each division receives an automatic bid to the regional tournament with the remaining invitations given to wild card teams that are determined by RPI. Each team plays the same number of intra-divisional games as each team within its division. Once the regular season is concluded, divisional standings are determined on the double three-point system (six points for a win, two points for a draw, no points for a loss). Only divisional games are included in the tiebreaking criteria.

Tie-breaking criteria for divisional ranking
The ranking of teams in each group are based on the following criteria in order:
1. Highest number of points
2. Winner of head-to-head competition
3. Greatest goal difference
  - Maximum ± 5 goal difference per match
4. Most goals scored
5. Most shutouts
6. Coin flip

In a tie breaking scenario involving more than 2 teams, the tiebreaker procedure would begin. If one team is identified as different and both remaining teams are still tied, the tie breaker procedure is restarted.

While only intra-divisional games will be counted in the division standings, all regional games are counted in the overall record used for the League RPI ranking.

=== Regional tournament ===
Each year, the SCSA hosts, what they call, the Region II Regional Tournament consisting of 12 women's teams and 16 men's teams. The tournament is two stage beginning with a round-robin group stage followed by a single-elimination knockout stage

For the men's division group stage, the 16 teams are split into four groups of four teams each. Each team plays every other team in their group meaning a total of 6 games are played within a group. The top two teams from each group advance to the round of 8.

For the women's division group stage, the 12 teams are split into four groups of four teams each. Each team plays every other team in their group meaning a total of 3 games are played within a group. The top two teams from each group advance to the round of 8.

To determine group standings, the three-point system (three points for a win, one point for a draw, no points for a loss) is used.

Tie-breaking criteria for group play
The ranking of teams in each group are based on the following criteria in order:
1. Highest number of points
2. Winner of head-to-head competition
3. Greatest goal difference
  - Maximum ± 5 goal difference per match
4. Most goals scored
5. Most shutouts

In a tie breaking scenario involving more than 2 teams, the tiebreaker procedure would begin. If one team is identified as different and both remaining teams are still tied, the tie breaker procedure is restarted.

If a tie still remained after the first 5 criteria, the following is used to break a tie:

1. NCAA kicks from the mark
  - If there was a three-way tie, a coin-flip would be conducted. The two teams that chose the same outcome would compete in kicks from the mark between each other. The winner would compete with the last remaining team in kicks from the mark
  - If there's a four-way tie, a drawing of lots would be conducted (only could occur in open division)

The knockout stage is a single-elimination tournament, in which each team plays in a one-off match. In the event of a tie, one 15-minute, sudden-victory overtime period begins. If still tied, a penalty shootout is used.

Games consist of two 35-minute halves. For pool play, round of 16, and quarterfinals halves are separated by a seven-minute halftime while the halves for the semifinals and finals are separated by a ten-minute halftime.

== Champions ==
=== Men's ===
==== SCSL (1994–2002) ====
The first 4 years that the region existed, the region itself relied on rankings and an outside, pre-existing league, the Southeast Collegiate Soccer Alliance (SCSL), to help determine national tournament bids. The SCSL typically hosted two tournaments: the "Final Four", consisting of the top two teams from the east and west divisions, and a 16-team invitational tournament the following week. The "Final Four" became the main qualifier for the league but notably, no men's team in region II attended NIRSA's national tournament until 1996 with teams generally participating in the NCSA tournament or opting out entirely.

SCSL Tournaments
Season	Champions	Score	Runners-up	Location	Ref.
1994	MTSU	2–2 (a.e.t.) (4–2 (p))	Alabama	Meridian, Mississippi	
1995	MTSU (2)	4–3 (a.e.t.)	Tennessee	Meridian, Mississippi	
1996	Mississippi State or Georgia Tech	(Note: Score and champion unknown)	Mississippi State or Georgia Tech	Meridian, Mississippi	
1997					
1998					
1999	Mississippi State	5–0	Alabama	Selma, Alabama	
2000	Mississippi State (2)	1–0	Alabama	Tupelo, Mississippi	
2001	Auburn	2–0	Mississippi State	Charlottesville, Virginia	

==== SCSL and Region II (2002–2004) ====
Beginning in 2002 for both the men's and women's division, the region II coordinators decided to host an end of season tournament where the regional tournament winner received an automatic bid to the national tournament. The first two years, the tournaments were hosted on different weekends, meaning teams could compete in both but in 2004, the tournaments were on the same weekend, forcing teams to choose which tournament to participate in.

Regional Tournaments
Season	League	Champions	Score	Runners-up	Location	Ref.
2002	SCSL	Vanderbilt	3–1	Mississippi State	Tupelo, Mississippi	
2002	Region II	Virginia	4–0	Florida	Columbus, Georgia	
2003	SCSL	Auburn (2)	3–0	Mississippi State	Tupelo, Mississippi	
2003	Region II	Virginia (2)	2–1	Wake Forest	Columbus, Georgia	
2004	SCSL	Georgia Tech	3–1	Vanderbilt	Tupelo, Mississippi	
2004	Region II	North Carolina	4–3	Florida	Cary, North Carolina	

==== Region II (2005–2009) ====
With the dissolution of the SCSL, the Region II tournament became the sole qualifier for nationals in the region

Region II Tournament
Season	Champions	Score	Runners-up	Location	Ref.
2005	Vanderbilt (2)	2–1	Virginia	Tupelo, Mississippi	
2006	Vanderbilt (3)	2–1	North Carolina	Tupelo, Mississippi	
2007	Vanderbilt (4)	6–0	George Mason	Tuscaloosa, Alabama	
2008	North Carolina (2)	1-0	Florida	Statesboro, Georgia	
2009	Georgia	1–0	Florida	East Ridge, Tennessee	

==== SCSA (2010–present) ====
NIRSA's region II was rebranded to the current Southeast Collegiate Soccer Alliance. Teams began to get divided into divisions within the region, with each divisional winner receiving a bid to the regional tournament and the remaining participating teams selected using RPI.

SCSA Regional Tournament
Season	Champions	Score	Runners-up	Location	Ref.
2010	Florida	1-0	North Carolina	Pensacola, Florida	
2011	Georgia (2)	(Note: Score unknown. Assumed Georgia were champs based on this Facebook post from Florida)	North Carolina	Rock Hill, South Carolina	
2012	Florida (2)	0–0 (a.e.t.) (9–8 (p))	Georgia	Rock Hill, South Carolina	
2013	Virginia Tech	0–0 (a.e.t.) (4–3 (p))	Georgia	Winston-Salem, North Carolina	
2014	Virginia Tech (2)	2–1	UCF	Winston-Salem, North Carolina	
2015	Florida State	1–0	Virginia Tech	Gainesville, Florida	
2016	UCF	1–0	North Carolina	Pensacola, Florida	
2017	NC State	2–2 (a.e.t.) (8–7 (p))	Virginia	Greenville, North Carolina	
2018	Virginia Tech (3)	4–0	UNC-Wilmington	Winston-Salem, North Carolina	
2019	Florida State (2)	1–1 (a.e.t.) (won on penalties)	North Carolina	Richmond, Virginia	
2020	Not held due to the COVID-19 pandemic.				
2021	North Carolina (3)	2–1	Appalachian State	Greenville, North Carolina	
2022	North Carolina (4)	5–1	William & Mary	Greenville, North Carolina	
2023	Virginia Tech (4)	1–0	North Carolina	Henrico, Virginia	
2024	UCF (2)	4-0	Georgia Tech	Gainesville, Florida	
2025	Georgia Tech	2–1	Virginia Tech	Browns Summit, North Carolina	

=== Women's ===
==== Region II (1995–2009) ====
The first 7 years that the region existed, no regional tournament was used for the women. The winner of the league was crowned as the team with the best record at the end of the season according to the coordinators, similar to what other soccer leagues do in Europe.

Region II end-of season rankings
Season	Champions	Runners-up	Third place	Ref.
1995	Unrecorded			
1996	JMU	Southern Mississippi	North Carolina	
1997	JMU (2)	West Virginia	Clemson	
1998	JMU (3)	Virginia Tech	Clemson	
1999	JMU (4)	Virginia Tech	North Carolina	
2000	Virginia Tech	Florida State	Georgia	
2001	Georgia	Virginia Tech	JMU	

Beginning in 2002 for both the men's and women's division, the region II coordinators decided to host an end of the season tournament due too a rapid growth in participating teams. The regional tournament winner received an automatic bid to the national tournament.

Region II Tournament
Season	Champions	Score	Runners-up	Location	Ref.
2002	JMU (5)	3–1	Florida	Columbus, Georgia	
2003	Florida	2–0	Georgia	Columbus, Georgia	
2004	JMU (6)	3–0	Virginia	Cary, North Carolina	
2005	JMU (7)	(Note: Score unknown)	Florida	Tupelo, Mississippi	
2006	Virginia Tech (2)	(Note: Score and team unknown)		Tupelo, Mississippi	
2007	Virginia Tech (3)	4–0	Georgia Tech	Tuscaloosa, Alabama	
2008	Virginia Tech (4)		Duke	Statesboro, Georgia	
2009	Virginia Tech (5)			Chattanooga, Tennessee	

==== SCSA (2010–present) ====
NIRSA region II was rebranded to the current Southeast Collegiate Soccer Alliance. Teams are divided into divisions within the region, with each divisional winner receiving a bid to the regional tournament. The remaining participating teams are selected using RPI.

Season	Champions	Score	Runners-up	Location	Ref.
2010	Virginia	(Note: Score unknown)	Virginia Tech	Pensacola, Florida	
2011	Virginia (2)		Virginia Tech	Rock Hill, South Carolina	
2012	Georgia		Virginia Tech	Rock Hill, South Carolina	
2013	North Carolina	4–0	Virginia Tech	Winston-Salem, North Carolina	
2014	North Carolina (2)	4–1	NC State	Winston-Salem, North Carolina	
2015	North Carolina (3)	2–1	Virginia Tech	Gainesville, Florida	
2016	North Carolina (4)	1–0	NC State	Pensacola, Florida	
2017	North Carolina (5)	3–0	Florida	Greenville, North Carolina	
2018	North Carolina (6)	1–0	NC State	Winston-Salem, North Carolina	
2019	Virginia Tech	1–0	Clemson	Richmond, Virginia	
2020	Not held due to the COVID-19 pandemic.				
2021	North Carolina (7)	2–0	Georgia Tech	Greenville, North Carolina	
2022	Virginia (3)		Florida State	Greenville, North Carolina	
2023	Virginia (4)	1–0	South Carolina	Henrico, Virginia	
2024	Georgia (2)	4–0	Auburn	Gainesville, Florida	
2025	Tennessee	1–0	Virginia Tech	Browns Summit, North Carolina	

== SCSA regional tournament appearances ==
=== Men's ===
Key
†	Regional champion
‡	National champion

Team	Logo	Apps	Year
North Carolina		15	2025, 2024, 2023, 2022^{†}, 2021^{†}, 2019, 2018, 2017, 2016, 2015^{‡}, 2014, 2013, 2012, 2011, 2010
Florida		15	2025, 2024, 2023, 2022, 2021, 2019, 2018^{‡}, 2017, 2016, 2014, 2013, 2012^{†}, 2011, 2010^{†}
UCF		13	2025, 2024^{†}, 2023, 2022, 2021, 2019, 2018, 2016^{†}, 2015, 2014, 2013, 2012, 2010
Virginia		13	2025, 2023, 2022, 2021, 2019, 2018, 2017, 2016^{‡}, 2015, 2014, 2013, 2012, 2010
Virginia Tech		11	2025, 2024, 2023^{†}, 2022, 2021, 2018^{†}, 2017, 2015, 2014^{†}, 2013^{†}, 2012
Georgia Tech		10	2025^{†}, 2024, 2023, 2022, 2021, 2019, 2018, 2017, 2016, 2015
Auburn		8	2025, 2024, 2022, 2019, 2016, 2014, 2013, 2012
NC State		8	2024, 2023, 2021, 2018, 2017^{†}, 2016, 2015, 2012
Clemson		8	2022, 2019, 2018, 2017, 2016, 2015, 2013, 2012
Tennessee		7	2025, 2024, 2023, 2022, 2021, 2013, 2012
UNC-Wilmington		7	2025, 2023, 2018, 2017, 2016, 2015, 2014
USF		7	2024, 2023, 2022, 2021, 2019, 2013, 2012
Florida State		6	2024, 2023, 2019^{†}, 2016^{†}, 2015^{†}, 2014
Georgia		6	2017, 2016, 2014, 2013, 2012, 2011
Kentucky		5	2025, 2024, 2023, 2022, 2014
Miami		5	2025, 2022, 2021, 2017, 2016
William & Mary		5	2024, 2023, 2022, 2021, 2018
Elon		5	2024, 2023, 2022, 2015, 2014
Alabama		5	2024, 2023, 2019, 2017, 2015
App State		4	2023, 2021, 2016, 2015
Emory		3	2025, 2021, 2016
South Carolina		3	2025, 2014, 2012
JMU		3	2022, 2021, 2014
NKU		3	2021, 2019, 2018
UT-Chattanooga		3	2018, 2017, 2016
Vanderbilt		3	2018, 2017, 2013
Georgia Southern		3	2018, 2017, 2012
Georgia College		3	2015, 2014, 2013
Davidson		1	2025, 2024
Wake Forest		2	2024, 2022
FIU		2	2018, 2017
Ole Miss		2	2018, 2017
Lynn		2	2016, 2015
Duke		2	2015, 2012
Florida Gulf Coast		2	2014, 2012
East Carolina		2	2013, 2012
High Point		1	2025
Mercer		1	2025
Kennesaw State		1	2019
MTSU		1	2015
Eastern Kentucky		1	2014
Georgia State		1	2013
Mississippi State		1	2013
North Florida		1	2013

=== Women's ===
Key
†	Regional champion
‡	National champion

Team	Logo	Apps	Year
North Carolina		15	2025, 2024, 2023, 2022, 2021^{†}, 2019, 2018^{†}, 2017^{†}, 2016^{†}, 2015^{†}, 2014^{†}, 2013^{†}, 2012, 2011, 2010
Virginia		14	2025, 2024, 2023^{†}, 2022^{†}, 2021, 2018, 2017, 2016, 2015, 2014, 2013, 2012, 2011, 2010^{†}
Florida		14	2024, 2023, 2022, 2021, 2019, 2018, 2017, 2016, 2015, 2014, 2013, 2012, 2011, 2010
Virginia Tech		13	2025, 2022, 2021, 2019^{†}, 2018, 2017, 2016, 2015, 2014, 2013, 2012, 2011, 2010
Vanderbilt		11	2025, 2024, 2023, 2022, 2021, 2019, 2018, 2017, 2015, 2014, 2013
NC State		11	2025, 2024, 2023, 2019, 2018, 2017, 2016, 2015, 2014, 2013, 2012
Clemson		11	2025, 2023, 2021, 2019, 2018, 2017, 2016, 2015, 2014, 2013, 2012
Georgia		9	2025, 2024^{†}, 2023, 2018, 2017, 2016, 2015, 2013, 2012^{†}
Florida State		7	2024, 2022, 2021, 2017, 2016, 2015, 2014
East Carolina		7	2022, 2021, 2018, 2017, 2015, 2014, 2012
Georgia Tech		6	2024, 2022, 2021, 2019, 2018, 2017
Tennessee		5	2025^{†}, 2024, 2023, 2017, 2016
Auburn		5	2025, 2024, 2014, 2013, 2012
UCF		5	2021, 2018, 2016, 2015, 2014
South Carolina		4	2025, 2024, 2023, 2022
Tampa		3	2025, 2024, 2023
William & Mary		3	2025, 2022, 2021
Alabama		3	2023, 2022, 2011
Wake Forest		3	2022, 2021, 2018
App State		3	2015, 2014, 2013
JMU		1	2019
Emory		1	2016
NKU		1	2016
Coastal Carolina		1	2013
UNC-Wilmington		1	2013
Duke		1	2012
Georgia Southern		1	2012

== NIRSA national champions and runners-up ==
Key
Match was won during extra time
Match was won on a penalty shoot-out

=== Men's ===
List of NIRSA National championships with men's Region II teams
Year	Champion	Score	Runner-up
2005	Colorado	2–1 (a.e.t.)	Vanderbilt
2009	Weber State	0–0 (a.e.t.) (3–2 p)	Florida
2015	North Carolina	2–0	Penn State
2016	Virginia	3–2	Ohio State
2018	Florida	1–0 (a.e.t.)	North Carolina
2023	BYU	2–0	Virginia Tech

=== Women's ===
List of NIRSA National championships with women's Region II teams
Year	Champion	Score	Runner-up
1994	Miami (OH)	2–0	Florida
2016	UC Santa Barbara	1–0	North Carolina
2021	Penn State	1–0	North Carolina

== NIRSA national championship appearances ==
=== Men's ===
School	Appearances		Highest finish	
School	Number	Most recent	Type	Year
North Carolina	19	2024	Champion	2015
Florida	15	2023	Champion	2018
Virginia	11	2025	Champion	2016
Virginia Tech	13	2025	Runner-up	2023
Vanderbilt	4	2007	Runner-up	2005
Georgia Tech	6	2025	Semifinals	2024
JMU	4	2022	Semifinals	1997
UCF	6	2025	Quarterfinals	2015
Auburn	5	2025	Quarterfinals	2003
Mississippi State	4	2006	Quarterfinals	2003, 2001
Florida State	3	2019	Quarterfinals	2015
NC State	1	2017	Quarterfinals	2017
Georgia	8	2013	Sweet 16	2013 (Note: Tournament cancelled before game could be played), 2012, 2009
Clemson	4	2022	Sweet 16	2003
William & Mary	1	2022	Consolation co-champ	2022
Appalachian State	1	2021	Consolation Quarterfinals	2021
Miami (FL)	1	2001	Quarterfinals	2001
Alabama	1	2000	4th group stage	2000
Georgia Southern	1	1998	Semifinals	1998

=== Women's ===
School	Appearances		Highest finish	
School	Number	Most recent	Type	Year
North Carolina	20	2025	Runner-up	2021, 2016
Florida	17	2023	Runner-up	1994
Virginia Tech	18	2025	Semifinals	2015, 2011
Virginia	14	2024	Semifinals	2012, 2006
JMU	11	2019	Semifinals	1997, 1996
Clemson	6	2019	Semifinals	2018
Georgia	4	2024	Semifinals	2024
Tennessee	3	2025	Semifinals	2025
Vanderbilt	3	2025	Semifinials	2023
Auburn	2	2025	Sweet 16	2025, 2024
Georgia Tech	2	2022	Sweet 16	2021
South Carolina	1	2023	Sweet 16	2023
Florida State	4	2022	Consolation Semifinal	2022, 2014
NC State	2	2018	Consolation Quarterfinals	2018, 2014

== Notes ==
- Many details and scores obtained from the official SCSA twitter @SCSARegion2, uncited because it's a primary source and generally unreliable
