= 2018 SCSA Regional Tournament =

- Association: NIRSA
- League: Southeast Collegiate Soccer Alliance
- Sport: Soccer
- Site: BB&T Soccer Park; Winston-Salem, NC
- Duration: November 2–4, 2018
- Teams: 16 (men's); 12 (women's)

Men's Championship Division
- Score: 4–0
- Champion: Virginia Tech (3rd title, 4th title game)
- Runners-up: UNC-Wilmington (1st title game)
- Season MVP: Garrett Craft (Virginia Tech)

Women's Championship Division
- Score: 1–0
- Champion: North Carolina (6th title, 6th title game)
- Runners-up: NC State (3rd title game)
- Season MVP: Caroline Wootten (North Carolina)

Southeast Collegiate Soccer Alliance seasons
- 2017 2019

The 2018 Southeast Collegiate Soccer Alliance Regional Tournament was the 9th edition of the Southeast Collegiate Soccer Alliance's postseason club soccer tournament, which was held at BB&T Soccer Park in Winston-Salem, North Carolina, from November 2–4, 2018. A tournament was held for each the men's and women's division, with each tournament champion receiving an automatic bid to the 2018 NIRSA National Soccer Championship's championship division. The remaining 2 of NIRSA Region II's automatic bids for each division were given out based on RPI, with a special consideration to this tournament's performance.

== Format ==
The tournament consisted of 12 women's teams and 16 men's teams. Each divisional champion received an automatic bid (6 for the women and 8 for the men) with the remaining wild card teams being the next highest RPI ranked teams that had not already qualified. Teams were divided into groups based on RPI.

For the men's division group stage, the 16 teams were split into four groups of four teams each. Each team played every other team in their group meaning a total of 6 games were played within a group. The top two teams from each group advanced to the knockout round.

For the women's division group stage, the 12 teams were split into three groups of four teams each. Each team played every other team in their group meaning a total of 6 games were played within a group. The top two teams from each group advanced to the semi-finals, with the best two teams receiving a bye to the semi-finals.

Pool play games were two 40-minute halves, separated by a seven-minute halftime and utilized the three points for a win system. After pool play, the two highest ranked teams from each group advanced to their respective gender division's knockout stage.

Tie-breaking criteria for group play
The ranking of teams in each group was based on the following criteria in order:
1. Highest number of points
2. Winner of head-to-head competition
3. Greatest goal difference
  - Maximum ± 5 goal difference per match
4. Most goals scored
5. Most shutouts

In a tie-breaking scenario involving more than 2 teams, the tie-breaker procedure would begin. If one team is identified as different and both remaining teams are still tied, the procedure is restarted. If a tie still remained after the first 5 criteria, the following was used to break a tie:

1. NCAA kicks from the mark
  - If there was a three-way tie, a coin-flip would be conducted. The two teams that chose the same outcome would compete in kicks from the mark between each other. The winner would compete with the last remaining team in kicks from the mark
  - If there's a four-way tie, a drawing of lots would be conducted

Knockout stage games also consisted of two 40-minute halves. The quarterfinals were separated by a seven-minute halftime while the semifinals and finals had a ten minute halftime. Knockout stage games needed to declare a winner. If a knockout-stage game was tied at the end of regulation, overtime would begin. Overtime consisted of one, 15-minute, golden-goal period. If still tied after overtime, kicks from the mark would determine the winner.

== Participants ==
=== Men's ===
Divisional champions
Division	Team	Appearance	Last bid
Atlantic North	North Carolina	9th	2017
Atlantic South	UNC-Wilmington	5th	2017
Coastal	FIU	2nd	2017
Coastal Plains	UCF	7th	2017
Central	Georgia Tech	4th	2017
Gulf Coast	Ole Miss	2nd	2017
Mountain East	Virginia	8th	2017
Mountain West	NKU	1st	Never

Wild cards
Division	Team	Appearance	Last bid
Coastal Plains	Florida	8th	2017
Mountain East	Virginia Tech	6th	2017
Atlantic North	NC State	5th	2017
Mountain West	Vanderbilt	3rd	2017
Mountain East	William & Mary	1st	Never
Central	Georgia Southern	3rd	2017
Mountain West	UT-Chattanooga	3rd	2017
Atlantic South	Clemson	6th	2017

=== Women's ===
Divisional champions
Division	Team	Appearance	Last bid
Florida	UCF	4th	2016
Southwest	Georgia	6th	2017
Southeast	Clemson	7th	2017
Northwest	Vanderbilt	5th	2017
Northeast	North Carolina	9th	2017
North	Virginia	9th	2017

Wild cards
Division	Team	Appearance	Last bid
North	Virginia Tech	9th	2017
Northeast	NC State	7th	2017
Northeast	East Carolina	5th	2017
Southwest	Georgia Tech	2nd	2017
Northeast	Wake Forest	1st	Never
Florida	Florida	9th	2017

== Group stage ==
=== Men's ===
Group A
Pos	Team	Pld	W	D	L	GF	GA	GD	Pts	Qualification
1	Florida	3	1	2	0	16	3	+5	5	Advanced to knockout stage
2	FIU	3	1	2	0	8	2	+5	5	Advanced to knockout stage
3	Virginia (Note: UTC forfeited their final game vs Virginia. Virginia was awarded 3 points and a +1 goal difference)	2	0	2	0	3	3	+1	5	
4	UT-Chattanooga (Note: UTC forfeited their final game vs Virginia. Was deducted 1 goal difference point)	2	0	0	3	0	19	−11	0	

Notes:

9:30pm EST	Virginia	2–2	Florida	Turf 3
Fri, November 2				Stadium: BB&T Soccer Park; Winston-Salem, NC

9:30pm EST	FIU	6–0	UTC	Turf 5
Fri, November 2				Stadium: BB&T Soccer Park; Winston-Salem, NC

9:45am EST	Florida	13–0	UTC	Turf 3
Sat, November 3				Stadium: BB&T Soccer Park; Winston-Salem, NC

9:45am EST	Virginia	1–1	FIU	Turf 5
Sat, November 3				Stadium: BB&T Soccer Park; Winston-Salem, NC

3:00pm EST	UTC	0–1; Forfeit	Virginia	Turf 3
Sat, November 3				Stadium: BB&T Soccer Park; Winston-Salem, NC

3:00pm EST	FIU	1–1	Florida	Turf 5
Sat, November 3				Stadium: BB&T Soccer Park; Winston-Salem, NC

Group B
Pos	Team	Pld	W	D	L	GF	GA	GD	Pts	Qualification
1	Vanderbilt	3	2	0	1	7	3	+4	6	Advanced to knockout stage
2	Clemson	3	2	0	1	7	4	+3	6	Advanced to knockout stage
3	Georgia Tech	3	2	0	1	4	2	+2	6	
4	Ole Miss	3	0	0	3	0	9	−9	0	

7:45pm EST	Georgia Tech	3–0	Clemson	Turf 4
Fri, November 2				Stadium: BB&T Soccer Park; Winston-Salem, NC

7:45pm EST	Ole Miss	0–4	Vanderbilt	Turf 5
Fri, November 2				Stadium: BB&T Soccer Park; Winston-Salem, NC

9:45am EST	Vanderbilt	1–3	Clemson	Turf 2
Sat, November 3				Stadium: BB&T Soccer Park; Winston-Salem, NC

9:45am EST	Ole Miss	0–1	Georgia Tech	Turf 4
Sat, November 3				Stadium: BB&T Soccer Park; Winston-Salem, NC

3:00pm EST	Georgia Tech	0–2	Vanderbilt	Grass 1
Sat, November 3				Stadium: BB&T Soccer Park; Winston-Salem, NC

3:00pm EST	Clemson	4–0	Ole Miss	Turf 4
Sat, November 3				Stadium: BB&T Soccer Park; Winston-Salem, NC

Group C
Pos	Team	Pld	W	D	L	GF	GA	GD	Pts	Qualification
1	North Carolina	3	1	2	0	9	4	+5	5	Advanced to knockout stage
2	Virginia Tech	3	1	2	0	4	2	+2	5	Advanced to knockout stage
3	UCF	3	1	2	0	6	5	+1	5	
4	Georgia Southern	3	0	0	3	1	9	−8	0	

6:00pm EST	North Carolina	1–1	Virginia Tech	Turf 5
Fri, November 2				Stadium: BB&T Soccer Park; Winston-Salem, NC

7:45pm EST	UCF	2–1	Georgia Southern	Turf 3
Fri, November 2				Stadium: BB&T Soccer Park; Winston-Salem, NC

8:00am EST	North Carolina	3–3	UCF	Grass 1
Sat, November 3				Stadium: BB&T Soccer Park; Winston-Salem, NC

8:00am EST	Virginia Tech	2–0	Georgia Southern	Turf 5
Sat, November 3				Stadium: BB&T Soccer Park; Winston-Salem, NC

1:15pm EST	UCF	1–1	Virginia Tech	Turf 2
Sat, November 3				Stadium: BB&T Soccer Park; Winston-Salem, NC

1:15pm EST	Georgia Southern	0–5	North Carolina	Turf 5
Sat, November 3				Stadium: BB&T Soccer Park; Winston-Salem, NC

Group D
Pos	Team	Pld	W	D	L	GF	GA	GD	Pts	Qualification
1	NC State	3	3	0	0	9	3	+6	9	Advanced to knockout stage
2	UNC-Wilmington	3	2	0	1	8	2	+6	6	Advanced to knockout stage
3	William & Mary	3	1	0	2	2	7	−5	3	
4	NKU	3	0	0	3	3	10	−7	0	

6:00pm EST	UNC-Wilmington	1–2	NC State	Turf 3
Fri, November 2				Stadium: BB&T Soccer Park; Winston-Salem, NC

7:45pm EST	NKU	1–2	William & Mary	Grass 1
Fri, November 2				Stadium: BB&T Soccer Park; Winston-Salem, NC

8:00am EST	UNC-Wilmington	5–0	NKU	Turf 3
Sat, November 3				Stadium: BB&T Soccer Park; Winston-Salem, NC

8:00am EST	NC State	4–0	William & Mary	Turf 4
Sat, November 3				Stadium: BB&T Soccer Park; Winston-Salem, NC

1:15pm EST	NKU	2–3	NC State	Turf 3
Sat, November 3				Stadium: BB&T Soccer Park; Winston-Salem, NC

1:15pm EST	William & Mary	0–2	UNC-Wilmington	Turf 4
Sat, November 3				Stadium: BB&T Soccer Park; Winston-Salem, NC

=== Women's ===
Group A
Pos	Team	Pld	W	D	L	GF	GA	GD	Pts	Qualification	Seed
1	NC State	3	3	0	0	5	2	+3	9	Advanced to semifinals	2
2	Virginia	3	2	0	1	7	4	+3	6	Advanced to first round	4
3	Vanderbilt	3	1	0	2	5	7	−2	3		7 (Note: Despite being ranked 7th and 6th seed unable to advance, they're unable to advance because the max teams that can advance from a group is two)
4	East Carolina	3	0	0	3	3	7	−4	0		11

Notes:

Scores

6:00pm EST	Virginia	1–2	NC State	Turf 4
Fri, November 2				Stadium: BB&T Soccer Park; Winston-Salem, NC

7:45pm EST	Vanderbilt	3–2	East Carolina	Turf 2
Fri, November 2				Stadium: BB&T Soccer Park; Winston-Salem, NC

8:00am EST	Vanderbilt	1–3	Virginia	Turf 2
Sat, November 3				Stadium: BB&T Soccer Park; Winston-Salem, NC

9:45am EST	East Carolina	0–1	NC State	Grass 1
Sat, November 3				Stadium: BB&T Soccer Park; Winston-Salem, NC

3:00pm EST	Virginia	3–1	East Carolina	Turf 2
Sat, November 3				Stadium: BB&T Soccer Park; Winston-Salem, NC

4:45pm EST	NC State	2–1	Vanderbilt	Turf 4
Sat, November 3				Stadium: BB&T Soccer Park; Winston-Salem, NC

Group B
Pos	Team	Pld	W	D	L	GF	GA	GD	Pts	Qualification	Seed
1	North Carolina	3	3	0	0	15	0	+13	9	Advanced to semifinals	1
2	Florida (Note: Despite Florida being ranked higher on tiebreakers, they declined their bid to advance so the third placed Wake Forest was allowed to take their place)	3	1	0	2	2	6	−4	3	Advanced to first round	8
3	Wake Forest	3	1	0	2	3	8	−4	3		9
4	Georgia	3	1	0	2	4	10	−5	3		10

Notes:

Scores

6:00pm EST	North Carolina	6–0	Wake Forest	Turf 2
Fri, November 2				Stadium: BB&T Soccer Park; Winston-Salem, NC

9:30pm EST	Florida	1–3	Georgia	Grass 1
Fri, November 2				Stadium: BB&T Soccer Park; Winston-Salem, NC

11:30am EST	North Carolina	3–0	Florida	Turf 2
Sat, November 3				Stadium: BB&T Soccer Park; Winston-Salem, NC

11:30am EST	Wake Forest	3–1	Georgia	Turf 4
Sat, November 3				Stadium: BB&T Soccer Park; Winston-Salem, NC

4:45pm EST	Georgia	0–6	North Carolina	Turf 2
Sat, November 3				Stadium: BB&T Soccer Park; Winston-Salem, NC

4:45pm EST	Florida	1–0	Wake Forest	Turf 5
Sat, November 3				Stadium: BB&T Soccer Park; Winston-Salem, NC

Group C
Pos	Team	Pld	W	D	L	GF	GA	GD	Pts	Qualification	Seed
1	Clemson	3	2	1	0	5	1	+4	7	Advanced to first round	3
2	Virginia Tech	3	1	2	0	4	1	+3	5	Advanced to first round	5
3	UCF	3	1	1	1	2	4	−2	4		6 (Note: Despite being ranked 6th, unable to advance because the max teams that can advance from a group is two)
4	Georgia Tech	3	0	0	3	1	6	−5	0		12

Notes:

Scores

9:30pm EST	UCF	0–0	Virginia Tech	Turf 2
Fri, November 2				Stadium: BB&T Soccer Park; Winston-Salem, NC

9:30pm EST	Clemson	1–0	Georgia Tech	Turf 4
Fri, November 2				Stadium: BB&T Soccer Park; Winston-Salem, NC

11:30am EST	Clemson	3–0	UCF	Turf 3
Sat, November 3				Stadium: BB&T Soccer Park; Winston-Salem, NC

11:30am EST	Georgia Tech	0–3	Virginia Tech	Turf 5
Sat, November 3				Stadium: BB&T Soccer Park; Winston-Salem, NC

4:45pm EST	Virginia Tech	1–1	Clemson	Grass 1
Sat, November 3				Stadium: BB&T Soccer Park; Winston-Salem, NC

4:45pm EST	UCF	2–1	Georgia Tech	Turf 3
Sat, November 3				Stadium: BB&T Soccer Park; Winston-Salem, NC

== Tournament bracket ==
Note: Some scores obtained through SCSA's Twitter, however uncited because it's a primary source and generally unreliable.

=== Men's ===
Quarterfinals
Sat • 6:30pm • Turf 2
Florida	1
Clemson	0
Sat • 6:30pm • Turf 4
NC State	1
Virginia Tech	3
Sat • 6:30pm • Turf 3
Vanderbilt (pen.)	1 (6)
FIU	1 (5)
Sat • 6:30pm • Turf 5
North Carolina	0
UNC-Wilmington	1

Semifinals
Sun • 9:00am • Turf 3
Florida	1
Virginia Tech	2
Sun • 9:00am • Turf 5
Vanderbilt	0
UNC-Wilmington	1

Final
Sun • 12:00pm • Turf 4
Virginia Tech	4
UNC-Wilmington	0

=== Women's ===
First round
Sat • 8:15pm • Turf 2
4	Virginia	0
5	Virginia Tech	1
Sat • 8:15pm • Turf 4
3	Clemson (a.e.t.)	3
6	Wake Forest	2

Semifinals
Sun • 9:00am • Turf 2
North Carolina	5
Virginia Tech	1
Sun • 9:00am • Turf 4
NC State	2
Clemson	0

Final
Sun • 12:00pm • Turf 2
North Carolina	1
NC State	0

== National Championship performance ==
=== Men's ===
Team	Qualification	App	Last bid	Result
Virginia Tech	Tournament champion	10th	2017	Semifinalist (0–2 vs North Carolina)
Virginia	Highest RPI remaining teams	10th	2017	Sweet 16 (0–2 vs North Carolina)
Florida	2nd highest RPI remaining teams	12th	2017	Champion
North Carolina	National wildcard	14th	2017	Runners-up (0–1 a.e.t. vs Florida)

=== Women's ===
Team	Qualification	App	Last bid	Result
North Carolina	Tournament champion	14th	2017	Sweet 16 (1–2 vs UC-Davis)
Clemson	Highest RPI remaining teams	5th	2013	Semifinalist (1–4 Ohio State)
Virginia	2nd highest RPI remaining teams	10th	2016	Consolation co-champion (Finals cancelled)
NC State	National wildcard	2nd	2014	Consolation quarterfinalist (2–4 vs Texas A&M)
