= 2017 SCSA Regional Tournament =

- Association: NIRSA
- League: Southeast Collegiate Soccer Alliance
- Sport: Soccer
- Site: ECU's North Recreational Complex; Greenville, NC
- Duration: October 27–29, 2017
- Teams: 16 (men's); 12 (women's)

Men's Championship Division
- Score: 2–2 (a.e.t.); 8–7 on penalties
- Champion: NC State (1st title, 1st title game)
- Runners-up: Virginia (1st title game)

Women's Championship Division
- Score: 3–0
- Champion: North Carolina (5th title, 5th title game)
- Runners-up: Florida (1st title game)

Southeast Collegiate Soccer Alliance seasons
- 2016 2018

The 2017 Southeast Collegiate Soccer Alliance Regional Tournament was the 8th edition of the Southeast Collegiate Soccer Alliance's postseason club soccer tournament, which was held at ECU's North Recreational Complex in Greenville, North Carolina, from October 27–29, 2017. A tournament was held for each the men's and women's division, with each tournament champion receiving an automatic bid to the 2017 NIRSA National Soccer Championship's championship division. The remaining 2 of NIRSA Region II's automatic bids for each division were given out based on RPI, with a special consideration to this tournament's performance.

== Format ==
The tournament consisted of twelve women's teams and sixteen men's teams. Each divisional champion received an automatic bid (6 for the women and 8 for the men) with the remaining wild card teams being the next highest RPI ranked teams that had not already qualified. Teams were divided into groups based on RPI.

For the men's division group stage, the 16 teams were split into four groups of four teams each. Each team played every other team in their group meaning a total of 6 games were played within a group. The top two teams from each group advanced to the knockout round.

For the women's division group stage, the 12 teams were split into three groups of four teams each. Each team played every other team in their group meaning a total of 6 games were played within a group. The top two teams from each group advanced to the semi-finals, with the best two teams across all pools receiving a bye to the semifinals.

== Participants ==
=== Men's ===
Divisional champions
Division	Team	Appearance	Last bid
Atlantic North	NC State	4th	2016
Atlantic South	UNC-Wilmington	4th	2016
Central	Georgia Tech	3rd	2016
Coastal	Miami (FL)	2nd	2016
Coastal Plains	UCF	Did not attend	
Gulf Coast	Alabama	2nd	2015
Mountain East	Virginia Tech	5th	2015
Mountain West	Vanderbilt	2nd	2013

At large bids
Team	Appearance	Last bid
North Carolina	8th	2016
Clemson	5th	2016
Ole Miss	1st	Never
Georgia	6th	2016
Virginia	7th	2016
Florida	7th	2016
FIU	1st	Never
UT – Chattanooga	2nd	2016
Georgia Southern	2nd	2012

=== Women's ===
Divisional champions
Division	Team	Appearance	Last bid
North	Virginia	8th	2016
Northeast	North Carolina	8th	2016
Northwest	Vanderbilt	4th	2015
Southeast	Clemson	6th	2016
Southwest	Georgia	5th	2016
Florida	Florida	8th	2016

At-large bids
Team	Appearance	Last bid
Virginia Tech	8th	2016
NC State	6th	2016
Tennessee	2nd	2016
Georgia Tech	1st	Never
Florida State	4th	2016
East Carolina	4th	2015

== Group stage ==
=== Men's ===
Group A
Pos	Team	Pld	W	D	L	GF	GA	GD	Pts	Qualification
1	Virginia	3	3	0	0	5	0	+5	9	Advanced to knockout stage
2	UNC-Wilmington	3	2	0	1	9	3	+4	6	Advanced to knockout stage
3	FIU	3	1	0	2	4	2	+2	3	
4	UT-Chattanooga	3	0	0	3	1	14	−11	0	

Scores

7:45pm EST	UNC-Wilmington	8–1	UT-Chattanooga	Field 3
Fri, October 27				Stadium: ECU's North Recreational Complex; Greenville, NC

9:30pm EST	Virginia	1–0	FIU	Field 3
Fri, October 27				Stadium: ECU's North Recreational Complex; Greenville, NC

9:45am EST	Virginia	2–0	UNC-Wilmington	Field 2
Sat, October 28				Stadium: ECU's North Recreational Complex; Greenville, NC

9:45am EST	UT-Chattanooga	0–4	FIU	Field 3
Sat, October 28				Stadium: ECU's North Recreational Complex; Greenville, NC

3:00pm EST	UT-Chattanooga	0–2	Virginia	Field 2
Sat, October 28				Stadium: ECU's North Recreational Complex; Greenville, NC

3:00pm EST	FIU	0–1	UNC-Wilmington	Field 3
Sat, October 28				Stadium: ECU's North Recreational Complex; Greenville, NC

Group B
Pos	Team	Pld	W	D	L	GF	GA	GD	Pts	Qualification
1	NC State	3	3	0	0	14	4	+10	9	Advanced to knockout stage
2	Clemson	3	1	1	1	8	6	+2	4	Advanced to knockout stage
3	Alabama	3	1	0	2	6	13	−7	3	
4	Georgia	3	0	1	2	6	11	−5	1	

Scores

6:00pm EST	NC State	2–0	Clemson	Field 7
Fri, October 27				Stadium: ECU's North Recreational Complex; Greenville, NC

9:30pm EST	Alabama	3–1	Georgia	Field 2
Fri, October 27				Stadium: ECU's North Recreational Complex; Greenville, NC

9:45am EST	Alabama	2–7	NC State	Field 7
Sat, October 28				Stadium: ECU's North Recreational Complex; Greenville, NC

9:45am EST	Clemson	3–3	Georgia	Field 8
Sat, October 28				Stadium: ECU's North Recreational Complex; Greenville, NC

3:00pm EST	Clemson	5–1	Alabama	Field 7
Sat, October 28				Stadium: ECU's North Recreational Complex; Greenville, NC

3:00pm EST	Georgia	2–5	NC State	Field 8
Sat, October 28				Stadium: ECU's North Recreational Complex; Greenville, NC

Group C
Pos	Team	Pld	W	D	L	GF	GA	GD	Pts	Qualification
1	North Carolina	3	3	0	0	8	1	+7	9	Advanced to knockout stage
2	Georgia Tech	3	2	0	1	11	1	+6	6	Advanced to knockout stage
3	Ole Miss	3	1	0	2	2	4	−2	3	
4	Miami (FL)	3	0	0	3	1	16	−11	0	

Scores

6:00pm EST	Georgia Tech	0–1	North Carolina	Field 2
Fri, October 27				Stadium: ECU's North Recreational Complex; Greenville, NC

7:45pm EST	Miami (FL)	0–2	Ole Miss	Field 8
Fri, October 27				Stadium: ECU's North Recreational Complex; Greenville, NC

8:00am EST	Miami (FL)	0–9	Georgia Tech	Field 2
Sat, October 28				Stadium: ECU's North Recreational Complex; Greenville, NC

8:00am EST	North Carolina	2–0	Ole Miss	Field 3
Sat, October 28				Stadium: ECU's North Recreational Complex; Greenville, NC

1:15pm EST	North Carolina	5–1	Miami (FL)	Field 3
Sat, October 28				Stadium: ECU's North Recreational Complex; Greenville, NC

1:15pm EST	Ole Miss	0–2	Georgia Tech	Field 2
Sat, October 28				Stadium: ECU's North Recreational Complex; Greenville, NC

Group D
Pos	Team	Pld	W	D	L	GF	GA	GD	Pts	Qualification
1	Florida	3	3	0	0	8	0	+8	9	Advanced to knockout stage
2	Virginia Tech	3	2	0	1	10	3	+7	6	Advanced to knockout stage
3	Vanderbilt	3	1	0	2	1	7	−6	3	
4	Georgia Southern	3	0	0	3	2	11	−9	0	

Scores

6:00pm EST	Virginia Tech	0–1	Florida	Field 8
Fri, October 27				Stadium: ECU's North Recreational Complex; Greenville, NC

7:45pm EST	Vanderbilt	1–0	Georgia Southern	Field 2
Fri, October 27				Stadium: ECU's North Recreational Complex; Greenville, NC

8:00am EST	Vanderbilt	0–5	Virginia Tech	Field 7
Sat, October 28				Stadium: ECU's North Recreational Complex; Greenville, NC

8:00am EST	Florida	5–0	Georgia Southern	Field 8
Sat, October 28				Stadium: ECU's North Recreational Complex; Greenville, NC

1:15pm EST	Florida	2–0	Vanderbilt	Field 8
Sat, October 28				Stadium: ECU's North Recreational Complex; Greenville, NC

1:15pm EST	Georgia Southern	2–5	Virginia Tech	Field 7
Sat, October 28				Stadium: ECU's North Recreational Complex; Greenville, NC

=== Women's ===
Group A
Pos	Team	Pld	W	D	L	GF	GA	GD	Pts	Qualification	Seed
1	North Carolina	3	3	0	0	9	1	+8	9	Advanced to semifinals	1
2	Virginia	3	2	0	1	8	4	+4	6	Advanced to first round	5
3	Tennessee	3	1	0	2	1	9	−8	3		8
4	Florida State	3	0	0	3	1	5	−4	0		12

Scores

6:00pm EST	North Carolina	3–1	Virginia	Field 3
Fri, October 27				Stadium: ECU's North Recreational Complex; Greenville, NC

9:30pm EST	Tennessee	1–0	Florida State	Field 1
Fri, October 27				Stadium: ECU's North Recreational Complex; Greenville, NC

8:00am EST	Tennessee	0–4	North Carolina	Field 1
Sat, October 28				Stadium: ECU's North Recreational Complex; Greenville, NC

9:45am EST	Virginia	2–1	Florida State	Field 1
Sat, October 28				Stadium: ECU's North Recreational Complex; Greenville, NC

3:00pm EST	Virginia	5–0	Tennessee	Field 1
Sat, October 28				Stadium: ECU's North Recreational Complex; Greenville, NC

4:45pm EST	Florida State	0–2	North Carolina	Field 1
Sat, October 28				Stadium: ECU's North Recreational Complex; Greenville, NC

Group B
Pos	Team	Pld	W	D	L	GF	GA	GD	Pts	Qualification	Seed
1	Georgia	3	2	1	0	5	1	+4	7	Advanced to first round	3
2	Virginia Tech	3	2	1	0	5	2	+3	7	Advanced to first round	4
3	East Carolina	3	0	1	2	2	4	−2	1		9
4	Clemson	3	0	1	2	3	8	−5	1		10

Scores

7:45pm EST	Clemson	1–1	East Carolina	Field
Fri, October 27				Stadium: ECU's North Recreational Complex; Greenville, NC

7:45pm EST	Georgia	0–0	Virginia Tech	Field
Fri, October 27				Stadium: ECU's North Recreational Complex; Greenville, NC

11:30am EST	Georgia	4–1	Clemson	Field
Sat, October 28				Stadium: ECU's North Recreational Complex; Greenville, NC

11:30am EST	East Carolina	1–2	Virginia Tech	Field
Sat, October 28				Stadium: ECU's North Recreational Complex; Greenville, NC

4:45pm EST	East Carolina	0–1	Georgia	Field
Sat, October 28				Stadium: ECU's North Recreational Complex; Greenville, NC

4:45pm EST	Virginia Tech	3–1	Clemson	Field
Sat, October 28				Stadium: ECU's North Recreational Complex; Greenville, NC

Group C
Pos	Team	Pld	W	D	L	GF	GA	GD	Pts	Qualification	Seed
1	NC State	3	3	0	0	8	3	+5	9	Advanced to semifinals	2
2	Florida	3	2	0	1	5	5	0	6	Advanced to first round	6
3	Georgia Tech	3	1	0	2	4	6	−2	3		7
4	Vanderbilt	3	0	0	3	5	8	−3	0		11

Scores

9:30pm EST	Florida	1–3	NC State	Field 7
Fri, October 27				Stadium: ECU's North Recreational Complex; Greenville, NC

9:30pm EST	Vanderbilt	2–3	Georgia Tech	Field 8
Fri, October 27				Stadium: ECU's North Recreational Complex; Greenville, NC

11:30am EST	Vanderbilt	2–3	Florida	Field 7
Sat, October 28				Stadium: ECU's North Recreational Complex; Greenville, NC

11:30am EST	NC State	3–1	Georgia Tech	Field 8
Sat, October 28				Stadium: ECU's North Recreational Complex; Greenville, NC

4:45pm EST	NC State	2–1	Vanderbilt	Field 7
Sat, October 28				Stadium: ECU's North Recreational Complex; Greenville, NC

4:45pm EST	Georgia Tech	0–1	Florida	Field 8
Sat, October 28				Stadium: ECU's North Recreational Complex; Greenville, NC

== Tournament bracket ==
=== Men's ===
Quarterfinals
Sat • 6:30pm • Field 1
Virginia	2
Clemson	0
Sat • 6:30pm • Field 2
North Carolina	1
Virginia Tech (a.e.t.)	2
Sat • 6:30pm • Field 7
Florida	3
Georgia Tech	0
Sat • 6:30pm • Field 8
NC State	3
UNC-Wilmington	0

Semifinals
Sun • 9:00am • Field 1
Virginia	1
Virginia Tech	0
Sun • 9:00am • Field 2
Florida	1
NC State	3

Final
Sun • 12:00pm • Field 2
Virginia	2 (7)
NC State (pen.)	2 (8)

=== Women's ===
First round
Sat • 8:15pm • Field 3
4	Virginia Tech	4
5	Virginia	2
Sat • 8:15pm • Field 6
3	Georgia	1 (5)
6	Florida (pen.)	1 (6)

Semifinals
Sun • 9:00am • Field 6
North Carolina	2
Virginia Tech	1
Sun • 9:00am • Field 3
NC State	1
Florida (a.e.t.)	2

Final
Sun • 12:00pm • Field 1
North Carolina	3
Florida	0

== National Championship performance ==
=== Men's ===
Team	Qualification	App	Last bid	Result
NC State	Tournament champion	1st	Never	Quarterfinalist (0–1 vs BYU)
Virginia	Highest RPI remaining teams	9th	2016	Sweet 16 (1–4 vs Wisconsin)
Florida	2nd highest RPI remaining teams	11th	2016	Semifinalist (0–1 vs Cal Poly)
Virginia Tech	National wildcard	9th	2015	Consolation quarterfinalist (3–3 | 4–3 pen vs Col. Mines)
North Carolina	National wildcard	13th	2016	Sweet 16 (0–2 vs BYU)

=== Women's ===
Team	Qualification	App	Last bid	Result
North Carolina	Tournament champion	13th	2016	Sweet 16 (1–2 vs Ohio State)
Virginia Tech	Highest RPI remaining teams	14th	2015	Sweet 16 (0–1 vs Wisconsin)
Georgia	2nd highest RPI remaining teams	3rd	2012	Consolation finalist (1–3 vs Ohio)
Florida	National wildcard	15th	2016	Sweet 16 (0–1 vs Texas)

== Notes ==
- Many details obtained through SCSA's Twitter, however generally unreliable and therefore uncited
