= 2013 NIRSA National Soccer Championship =

- League: NIRSA
- Sport: Soccer
- Site: Reach 11 Sports Complex; Phoenix, Arizona
- Duration: November 21–23, 2013
- Teams: 24
- Results: Official Results

No champions (rain cancellation)

NIRSA national soccer championships seasons
- ← 2012 2014 →

The 2013 NIRSA national soccer championship was the 20th NIRSA National Soccer Championships, the annual national championships for United States-based, collegiate club soccer teams organized by NIRSA. It took place at Reach 11 Sports Complex in Phoenix, Arizona from Thursday, November 21 to Saturday, November 23, 2013.

After the first day of games, persistent rain over Thursday night resulted in the closure of all Reach 11's fields for all of Friday. The rain continued through to Saturday which inevitably resulted in the cancellation of the remainder of the tournament. The weekend saw Phoenix receive over 2.5 inches of rain in a 30-hour period, more than four times the 0.65 inches it typically receives in the entire of month of November. Attempts at a continuation, like the one that happened when rain cancelled the 2004 tournament, were ultimately unsuccessful meaning the championship would see, for the first time in its 20-year history, not a single division able to name a champion.

== Format ==
The competition consisted of 96 teams: 48 men's teams and 48 women's teams. Each of these divisions were further divided into two 24-team divisions: the championship and open. The championship division divided teams into eight groups of three while the open division divided teams into six groups of four, both engaging in a round-robin tournament that determined teams able to advance to a knockout stage. Pool play games were two 40-minute halves, separated by a seven-minute halftime and utilized the three points for a win system. In the championship division, the two highest ranked teams from each group advanced to their knockout stage, with the third placed team advancing to a consolation bracket. In the open division, the top team from each group as well as the two best second placed teams advanced to their knockout stage.

Tie-breaking criteria for group play
The ranking of teams in each group was based on the following criteria in order:
1. Highest number of points
2. Winner of head-to-head competition
3. Greatest goal difference
  - Maximum ± 5 goal difference per match
4. Most goals scored
5. Most shutouts

In a tie breaking scenario involving more than 2 teams, the tiebreaker procedure would begin. If one team is identified as different and both remaining teams are still tied, the tie breaker procedure is restarted.

If a tie still remained after the first 5 criteria, the following was used to break a tie:

1. NCAA kicks from the mark
  - If there was a three-way tie, a coin-flip would be conducted. The two teams that chose the same outcome would compete in kicks from the mark between each other. The winner would compete with the last remaining team in kicks from the mark
  - If there's a four-way tie, a drawing of lots would be conducted (only could occur in open division)

Knockout stage games also consisted of two 40-minute halves. The round of 16 and quarterfinals were separated by a seven-minute halftime while the semifinals and finals had a ten-minute halftime. Knockout stage games needed to declare a winner. If a knockout-stage game was tied at the end of regulation, overtime would begin. Overtime consisted of one, 15-minute, golden-goal period. If still tied after overtime, kicks from the mark would determine the winner.

== Qualification and selections ==
Each of the six regions received three automatic bids for both the men's and women's championship that they awarded to its members. The final six bids were considered "at-large", and were given out by NIRSA to teams, typically based on their regional tournament results and RPI.

The 48 remaining teams participated in the open division. Participants were chosen on a first-come first-serve basis through IMLeagues. Registration began September 24 at 8:00am PDT. The first four teams per region that register guaranteed a spot with each remaining team in the region being placed on the waitlist. If a region didn't fill up by 5:00pm PDT on September 24, waitlist teams would begin to fill those spots.

=== Men's championship ===
Participating teams
Region	Team	Appearance	Last Bid
I	Penn State	13th	2012
I	Delaware	8th	2011
I	Northeastern	1st	Never
II	Florida	8th	2012
II	Georgia	8th	2012
II	Virginia Tech	6th	2012
III	Illinois	11th	2012
III	Michigan	11th	2011
III	Ohio State	9th	2012
III	Michigan State	7th	2012
III	Cincinnati	2nd	2010
IV	Texas	15th	2012
IV	Texas A&M	14th	2012
IV	Missouri	7th	2011
IV	Kansas State	4th	2007
IV	UTEP	2nd	2005
IV	Rice	2nd	2002
V	Colorado State	16th	2011
V	Colorado	14th	2012
V	Colorado Mines	3rd	2012
VI	Weber State	13th	2012
VI	UC Santa Barabara	9th	2011
VI	Cal Poly	5th	2012
VI	UC Davis	1st	Never

=== Women's championship ===
Participating teams
Region	Team	Appearance	Last Bid
I	Penn State	18th	2011
I	Delaware	11th	2012
I	Pitt	4th	2012
II	Virginia Tech	13th	2012
II	Florida	11th	2011
II	North Carolina	10th	2012
II	Clemson	4th	1998
III	Michigan	15th	2012
III	Ohio State	13th	2012
III	Miami (OH)	14th	2012
III	Illinois	9th	2009
III	Dayton	5th	2008
IV	Texas A&M	14th	2012
IV	Texas	13th	2012
IV	Baylor	9th	2012
IV	Missouri	2nd	2009
V	Colorado	19th	2012
V	Colorado State	17th	2012
V	Air Force	1st	Never
VI	UC-Santa Barbara	13th	2012
VI	UCLA	6th	2011
VI	Salt Lake CC	5th	1999
VI	Cal Poly	4th	2012
VI	Southern Cal (USC)	1st	Never

=== Men's open ===
Region	Num	Team
I	5	UConn, Penn, Boston College, SUNY Cortland, Villanova
II	2	JMU, Miami (FL)
III	1	UW-Milwaukee
IV	6	Kansas, Arkansas, Texas Tech, Texas "B", Wash U, Oklahoma
V	3	Iowa State, Colorado "Black", Colorado Mesa
VI	7	San Diego State, Cal State Fullerton, Southern Cal (USC), UC-Berkeley, Northern Arizona, Cal Poly "B", Utah Valley

=== Women's open ===
Region	Num	Team
I	5	Boston College, Cornell, Northeastern, Penn, Villanova
II	5	Virginia, JMU, Miami (FL), Mary Washington, Vanderbilt
III	1	UW-Milwaukee
IV	5	Kansas, Texas Tech, Texas "B", Iowa State, Wash U
V	3	Colorado "Black", Denver, Colorado Mines
VI	5	Arizona State, UC-Davis, UC-Berkeley, San Diego State, Northern Arizona

== Group stage ==
=== Men's championship ===
Group A
Pos	Team	Pld	W	D	L	GF	GA	GD	Pts	Qualification
1	Rice	2	1	1	0	1	0	+1	4	Advanced to knockout stage
2	Penn State	2	1	0	1	1	1	0	3	Advanced to knockout stage
3	Virginia Tech	2	0	1	1	0	1	−1	1	Consolation

Scores

8:00am MST	Penn State	0–1	Rice	Field 11
Thu, November 21		Report		Stadium: Reach 11 Sports Complex; Phoenix, Arizona

1:15pm MST	Rice	0–0	Virginia Tech	Field 11
Thu, November 21		Report		Stadium: Reach 11 Sports Complex; Phoenix, Arizona

6:30pm MST	Virginia Tech	0–1	Penn State	Field 11
Thu, November 21		Report		Stadium: Reach 11 Sports Complex; Phoenix, Arizona

Group B
Pos	Team	Pld	W	D	L	GF	GA	GD	Pts	Qualification
1	Weber State	2	2	0	0	5	1	+4	6	Advanced to knockout stage
2	Texas A&M	2	1	0	1	2	2	0	3	Advanced to knockout stage
3	Northeastern	2	0	0	2	2	6	−4	0	Consolation

Scores

8:00am MST	Weber State	1–0	Texas A&M	Field 12
Thu, November 21		Report		Stadium: Reach 11 Sports Complex; Phoenix, Arizona

1:15pm MST	Texas A&M	2–1	Northeastern	Field 12
Thu, November 21		Report		Stadium: Reach 11 Sports Complex; Phoenix, Arizona

6:30pm MST	Northeastern	1–4	Weber State	Field 12
Thu, November 21		Report		Stadium: Reach 11 Sports Complex; Phoenix, Arizona

Group C
Pos	Team	Pld	W	D	L	GF	GA	GD	Pts	Qualification
1	Ohio State	2	1	1	0	3	1	+2	4	Advanced to knockout stage
2	UC-Santa Barbara	2	1	1	0	3	2	+1	4	Advanced to knockout stage
3	Colorado Mines	2	0	0	2	1	4	−3	0	Consolation

Scores

8:00am MST	Ohio State	1–1	UCSB	Field 13
Thu, November 21		Report		Stadium: Reach 11 Sports Complex; Phoenix, Arizona

1:15pm MST	UCSB	2–1	Colorado Mines	Field 13
Thu, November 21		Report		Stadium: Reach 11 Sports Complex; Phoenix, Arizona

6:30pm MST	Colorado Mines	0–2	Ohio State	Field 13
Thu, November 21		Report		Stadium: Reach 11 Sports Complex; Phoenix, Arizona

Group D
Pos	Team	Pld	W	D	L	GF	GA	GD	Pts	Qualification
1	UC Davis	2	1	1	0	1	0	+1	4	Advanced to knockout stage
2	Cincinnati	2	0	2	0	1	1	0	2	Advanced to knockout stage
3	Texas	2	0	1	1	1	2	−1	1	Consolation

Scores

8:00am MST	Texas	1–1	Cincinnati	Field 14
Thu, November 21		Report		Stadium: Reach 11 Sports Complex; Phoenix, Arizona

1:15pm MST	Cincinnati	0–0	UC Davis	Field 14
Thu, November 21		Report		Stadium: Reach 11 Sports Complex; Phoenix, Arizona

6:30pm MST	UC Davis	1–0	Texas	Field 14
Thu, November 21		Report		Stadium: Reach 11 Sports Complex; Phoenix, Arizona

Group E
Pos	Team	Pld	W	D	L	GF	GA	GD	Pts	Qualification
1	Colorado State	2	1	1	0	2	1	+1	4	Advanced to knockout stage
2	Kansas State	2	0	2	0	2	2	0	2	Advanced to knockout stage
3	Michigan	2	0	1	1	1	2	−1	1	Consolation

Scores

9:45am MST	Colorado State	1–0	Michigan	Field 11
Thu, November 21		Report		Stadium: Reach 11 Sports Complex; Phoenix, Arizona

3:00pm MST	Michigan	1–1	Kansas State	Field 11
Thu, November 21		Report		Stadium: Reach 11 Sports Complex; Phoenix, Arizona

8:15pm MST	Kansas State	1–1	Colorado State	Field 11
Thu, November 21		Report		Stadium: Reach 11 Sports Complex; Phoenix, Arizona

Group F
Pos	Team	Pld	W	D	L	GF	GA	GD	Pts	Qualification
1	Illinois	2	1	1	0	1	0	+1	4	Advanced to knockout stage
2	Florida	2	1	0	1	3	2	+1	3	Advanced to knockout stage
3	UTEP	2	0	1	1	1	3	−2	1	Consolation

Scores

9:45am MST	Florida	3–1	UTEP	Field 12
Thu, November 21		Report		Stadium: Reach 11 Sports Complex; Phoenix, Arizona

3:00pm MST	UTEP	0–0	Illinois	Field 12
Thu, November 21		Report		Stadium: Reach 11 Sports Complex; Phoenix, Arizona

8:15pm MST	Illinois	1–0	Florida	Field 12
Thu, November 21		Report		Stadium: Reach 11 Sports Complex; Phoenix, Arizona

Group G
Pos	Team	Pld	W	D	L	GF	GA	GD	Pts	Qualification
1	Georgia	2	1	1	0	3	1	+2	4	Advanced to knockout stage
2	Missouri	2	0	2	0	1	1	0	2	Advanced to knockout stage
3	Colorado “Gold”	2	0	1	1	0	2	−2	1	Consolation

Scores

9:45am MST	Georgia	1–1	Missouri	Field 13
Thu, November 21		Report		Stadium: Reach 11 Sports Complex; Phoenix, Arizona

3:00pm MST	Missouri	0–0	Colorado “Gold”	Field 13
Thu, November 21		Report		Stadium: Reach 11 Sports Complex; Phoenix, Arizona

8:15pm MST	Colorado “Gold”	0–2	Georgia	Field 13
Thu, November 21		Report		Stadium: Reach 11 Sports Complex; Phoenix, Arizona

Group H
Pos	Team	Pld	W	D	L	GF	GA	GD	Pts	Qualification
1	Michigan State	2	2	0	0	5	1	+4	6	Advanced to knockout stage
2	Cal Poly	2	1	0	1	3	3	0	3	Advanced to knockout stage
3	Delaware	2	0	0	2	0	4	−4	0	Consolation

Scores

9:45am MST	Michigan State	3–1	Cal Poly	Field 14
Thu, November 21		Report		Stadium: Reach 11 Sports Complex; Phoenix, Arizona

3:00pm MST	Cal Poly	2–0	Delaware	Field 14
Thu, November 21		Report		Stadium: Reach 11 Sports Complex; Phoenix, Arizona

8:15pm MST	Delaware	0–2	Michigan State	Field 14
Thu, November 21		Report		Stadium: Reach 11 Sports Complex; Phoenix, Arizona

=== Women's championship ===
Group A
Pos	Team	Pld	W	D	L	GF	GA	GD	Pts	Qualification
1	Florida	2	2	0	0	6	2	+4	6	Advanced to knockout stage
2	Texas	2	1	0	1	1	1	0	3	Advanced to knockout stage
3	Salt Lake CC	2	0	0	2	2	6	−4	0	Consolation

Scores

8:00am MST	Texas	1–0	Salt Lake CC	Field 15
Thu, November 21		Report		Stadium: Reach 11 Sports Complex; Phoenix, Arizona

1:15pm MST	Salt Lake CC	2–5	Florida	Field 15
Thu, November 21		Report		Stadium: Reach 11 Sports Complex; Phoenix, Arizona

6:30pm MST	Florida	1–0	Texas	Field 15
Thu, November 21		Report		Stadium: Reach 11 Sports Complex; Phoenix, Arizona

Group B
Pos	Team	Pld	W	D	L	GF	GA	GD	Pts	Qualification
1	Cal Poly	2	1	1	0	4	2	+2	4	Advanced to knockout stage
2	Illinois	2	1	0	1	2	3	−1	3	Advanced to knockout stage
3	Colorado	2	0	1	1	1	2	−1	1	Consolation

Scores

8:00am MST	Illinois	1–3	Cal Poly	Field 16
Thu, November 21		Report		Stadium: Reach 11 Sports Complex; Phoenix, Arizona

1:15pm MST	Cal Poly	1–1	Colorado	Field 16
Thu, November 21		Report		Stadium: Reach 11 Sports Complex; Phoenix, Arizona

6:30pm MST	Colorado	0–1	Illinois	Field 16
Thu, November 21		Report		Stadium: Reach 11 Sports Complex; Phoenix, Arizona

Group C
Pos	Team	Pld	W	D	L	GF	GA	GD	Pts	Qualification
1	Pitt	2	1	1	0	5	2	+3	4	Advanced to knockout stage
2	UCLA	2	1	1	0	3	2	+1	4	Advanced to knockout stage
3	Dayton	2	0	0	2	0	4	−4	0	Consolation

Scores

8:00am MST	UCLA	1–0	Dayton	Field 17
Thu, November 21		Report		Stadium: Reach 11 Sports Complex; Phoenix, Arizona

1:15pm MST	Dayton	0–3	Pitt	Field 17
Thu, November 21		Report		Stadium: Reach 11 Sports Complex; Phoenix, Arizona

6:30pm MST	Pitt	2–2	UCLA	Field 17
Thu, November 21		Report		Stadium: Reach 11 Sports Complex; Phoenix, Arizona

Group D
Pos	Team	Pld	W	D	L	GF	GA	GD	Pts	Qualification
1	Delaware	2	2	0	0	5	1	+4	6	Advanced to knockout stage
2	Texas A&M	2	1	0	1	3	3	0	3	Advanced to knockout stage
3	Clemson	2	0	0	2	1	5	−4	0	Consolation

Scores

8:00am MST	Texas A&M	2–1	Clemson	Field 18
Thu, November 21		Report		Stadium: Reach 11 Sports Complex; Phoenix, Arizona

1:15pm MST	Clemson	0–3	Delaware	Field 18
Thu, November 21		Report		Stadium: Reach 11 Sports Complex; Phoenix, Arizona

6:30pm MST	Delaware	2–1	Texas A&M	Field 18
Thu, November 21		Report		Stadium: Reach 11 Sports Complex; Phoenix, Arizona

Group E
Pos	Team	Pld	W	D	L	GF	GA	GD	Pts	Qualification
1	UC-Santa Barbara	2	2	0	0	6	0	+6	6	Advanced to knockout stage
2	Missouri	2	1	0	1	5	3	+2	3	Advanced to knockout stage
3	Air Force	2	0	0	2	1	9	−8	0	Consolation

Scores

9:45am MST	UCSB	4–0	Air Force	Field 15
Thu, November 21		Report		Stadium: Reach 11 Sports Complex; Phoenix, Arizona

3:00pm MST	Air Force	1–5	Missouri	Field 15
Thu, November 21		Report		Stadium: Reach 11 Sports Complex; Phoenix, Arizona

8:15pm MST	Missouri	0–2	UCSB	Field 15
Thu, November 21		Report		Stadium: Reach 11 Sports Complex; Phoenix, Arizona

Group F
Pos	Team	Pld	W	D	L	GF	GA	GD	Pts	Qualification
1	Penn State	2	1	1	0	3	1	+2	4	Advanced to knockout stage
2	Miami (OH)	2	0	2	0	1	1	0	2	Advanced to knockout stage
3	Virginia Tech	2	0	1	1	0	2	−2	1	Consolation

Scores

9:45am MST	Penn State	1–1	Miami (OH)	Field 16
Thu, November 21		Report		Stadium: Reach 11 Sports Complex; Phoenix, Arizona

3:00pm MST	Miami (OH)	0–0	Virginia Tech	Field 16
Thu, November 21		Report		Stadium: Reach 11 Sports Complex; Phoenix, Arizona

8:15pm MST	Virginia Tech	0–2	Penn State	Field 16
Thu, November 21		Report		Stadium: Reach 11 Sports Complex; Phoenix, Arizona

Group G
Pos	Team	Pld	W	D	L	GF	GA	GD	Pts	Qualification
1	Colorado State	2	2	0	0	4	1	+3	6	Advanced to knockout stage
2	Ohio State	2	1	0	1	2	2	0	3	Advanced to knockout stage
3	Southern Cal(USC)	2	0	0	2	1	4	−3	0	Consolation

Scores

9:45am MST	Colorado State	2–1	USC	Field 17
Thu, November 21		Report		Stadium: Reach 11 Sports Complex; Phoenix, Arizona

3:00pm MST	USC	0–2	Ohio State	Field 17
Thu, November 21		Report		Stadium: Reach 11 Sports Complex; Phoenix, Arizona

8:15pm MST	Ohio State	0–2	Colorado State	Field 17
Thu, November 21		Report		Stadium: Reach 11 Sports Complex; Phoenix, Arizona

Group H
Pos	Team	Pld	W	D	L	GF	GA	GD	Pts	Qualification
1	North Carolina	2	1	1	0	4	3	+1	4	Advanced to knockout stage
2	Michigan	2	1	1	0	4	3	+1	4	Advanced to knockout stage
3	Baylor	2	0	0	2	2	4	−2	0	Consolation

Scores

9:45am MST	North Carolina	2–1	Baylor	Field 18
Thu, November 21		Report		Stadium: Reach 11 Sports Complex; Phoenix, Arizona

3:00pm MST	Baylor	1–2	Michigan	Field 18
Thu, November 21		Report		Stadium: Reach 11 Sports Complex; Phoenix, Arizona

8:15pm MST	Michigan	2–2	North Carolina	Field 18
Thu, November 21		Report		Stadium: Reach 11 Sports Complex; Phoenix, Arizona

=== Men's open ===
Group A
Pos	Team	Pld	W	D	L	GF	GA	GD	Pts	Qualification
1	UC-Berkeley	2	1	1	0	4	0	+4	4	Cancelled prior to conclusion of all games
2	Colorado Mesa	2	1	1	0	3	2	+1	4	Cancelled prior to conclusion of all games
3	UPenn	2	1	0	1	3	3	0	3	Cancelled prior to conclusion of all games
4	Oklahoma	2	0	0	2	0	5	−5	0	Cancelled prior to conclusion of all games

Scores

8:00am MST	UC-Berkeley	0–0	Colorado Mesa	Field 2
Thu, November 21		Report		Stadium: Reach 11 Sports Complex; Phoenix, Arizona

8:00am MST	UPenn	1–0	Oklahoma	Field 3
Thu, November 21		Report		Stadium: Reach 11 Sports Complex; Phoenix, Arizona

3:00pm MST	Oklahoma	0–4	UC-Berkeley	Field 2
Thu, November 21		Report		Stadium: Reach 11 Sports Complex; Phoenix, Arizona

3:00pm MST	Colorado Mesa	3–2	UPenn	Field 3
Thu, November 21		Report		Stadium: Reach 11 Sports Complex; Phoenix, Arizona

8:00am MST	UC-Berkeley	CANCELLED	UPenn	Field 2
Fri, November 23		Report		Stadium: Reach 11 Sports Complex; Phoenix, Arizona

8:00am MST	Oklahoma	CANCELLED	Colorado Mesa	Field 3
Fri, November 23		Report		Stadium: Reach 11 Sports Complex; Phoenix, Arizona

Group B
Pos	Team	Pld	W	D	L	GF	GA	GD	Pts	Qualification
1	San Diego State	2	2	0	0	4	0	+4	6	Cancelled prior to conclusion of all games
2	UConn	2	2	0	0	3	0	+3	6	Cancelled prior to conclusion of all games
3	Wash U	2	0	0	2	0	2	−2	0	Cancelled prior to conclusion of all games
4	SUNY Cortland	2	0	0	2	0	5	−5	0	Cancelled prior to conclusion of all games

Scores

8:00am MST	San Diego State	3–0	SUNY Cortland	Field 5
Thu, November 21		Report		Stadium: Reach 11 Sports Complex; Phoenix, Arizona

8:00am MST	UConn	1–0	Wash U	Field 6
Thu, November 21		Report		Stadium: Reach 11 Sports Complex; Phoenix, Arizona

3:00pm MST	Wash U	0–1	San Diego State	Field 5
Thu, November 21		Report		Stadium: Reach 11 Sports Complex; Phoenix, Arizona

3:00pm MST	SUNY Cortland	0–2	UConn	Field 6
Thu, November 21		Report		Stadium: Reach 11 Sports Complex; Phoenix, Arizona

8:00am MST	San Diego State	CANCELLED	UConn	Field 5
Fri, November 23		Report		Stadium: Reach 11 Sports Complex; Phoenix, Arizona

8:00am MST	Wash U	CANCELLED	SUNY Cortland	Field 6
Fri, November 23		Report		Stadium: Reach 11 Sports Complex; Phoenix, Arizona

Group C
Pos	Team	Pld	W	D	L	GF	GA	GD	Pts	Qualification
1	USC	2	1	1	0	2	1	+1	4	Cancelled prior to conclusion of all games
2	Utah Valley	2	0	2	0	1	1	0	2	Cancelled prior to conclusion of all games
3	Boston College	2	0	2	0	1	1	0	2	Cancelled prior to conclusion of all games
4	Texas “B”	2	0	1	1	1	2	−1	1	Cancelled prior to conclusion of all games

Scores

8:00am MST	USC	1–0	Texas “B”	Field 8
Thu, November 21		Report		Stadium: Reach 11 Sports Complex; Phoenix, Arizona

8:00am MST	Boston College	0–0	Utah Valley	Field 9
Thu, November 21		Report		Stadium: Reach 11 Sports Complex; Phoenix, Arizona

3:00pm MST	Utah Valley	1–1	USC	Field 8
Thu, November 21		Report		Stadium: Reach 11 Sports Complex; Phoenix, Arizona

3:00pm MST	Texas “B”	1–1	Boston College	Field 9
Thu, November 21		Report		Stadium: Reach 11 Sports Complex; Phoenix, Arizona

8:00am MST	USC	CANCELLED	Boston College	Field 8
Fri, November 23		Report		Stadium: Reach 11 Sports Complex; Phoenix, Arizona

8:00am MST	Utah Valley	CANCELLED	Texas “B”	Field 9
Fri, November 23		Report		Stadium: Reach 11 Sports Complex; Phoenix, Arizona

Group D
Pos	Team	Pld	W	D	L	GF	GA	GD	Pts	Qualification
1	Iowa State	2	1	1	0	2	0	+2	4	Cancelled prior to conclusion of all games
2	Miami (FL)	2	0	2	0	1	1	0	2	Cancelled prior to conclusion of all games
3	Villanova	2	0	2	0	1	1	0	2	Cancelled prior to conclusion of all games
4	Northern Arizona	2	0	1	1	0	2	−2	1	Cancelled prior to conclusion of all games

Scores

9:45am MST	Iowa State	2–0	Northern Arizona	Field 2
Thu, November 21		Report		Stadium: Reach 11 Sports Complex; Phoenix, Arizona

9:45am MST	Miami (FL)	1–1	Villanova	Field 3
Thu, November 21		Report		Stadium: Reach 11 Sports Complex; Phoenix, Arizona

4:45pm MST	Villanova	0–0	Iowa State	Field 2
Thu, November 21		Report		Stadium: Reach 11 Sports Complex; Phoenix, Arizona

4:45pm MST	Northern Arizona	0–0	Miami (FL)	Field 3
Thu, November 21		Report		Stadium: Reach 11 Sports Complex; Phoenix, Arizona

10:00am MST	Iowa State	CANCELLED	Miami (FL)	Field 2
Fri, November 23		Report		Stadium: Reach 11 Sports Complex; Phoenix, Arizona

10:00am MST	Villanova	CANCELLED	Northern Arizona	Field 3
Fri, November 23		Report		Stadium: Reach 11 Sports Complex; Phoenix, Arizona

Group E
Pos	Team	Pld	W	D	L	GF	GA	GD	Pts	Qualification
1	JMU	2	2	0	0	6	0	+6	6	Cancelled prior to conclusion of all games
2	Cal Poly “B”	2	1	0	1	4	1	+3	3	Cancelled prior to conclusion of all games
3	Arkansas	2	0	1	1	1	5	−4	1	Cancelled prior to conclusion of all games
4	UW Milwaukee	2	0	1	1	1	6	−5	1	Cancelled prior to conclusion of all games

Scores

9:45am MST	JMU	1–0	Cal Poly “B”	Field 5
Thu, November 21		Report		Stadium: Reach 11 Sports Complex; Phoenix, Arizona

9:45am MST	Arkansas	1–1	UW Milwaukee	Field 6
Thu, November 21		Report		Stadium: Reach 11 Sports Complex; Phoenix, Arizona

4:45pm MST	UW Milwaukee	0–5	JMU	Field 5
Thu, November 21		Report		Stadium: Reach 11 Sports Complex; Phoenix, Arizona

4:45pm MST	Cal Poly “B”	4–0	Arkansas	Field 6
Thu, November 21		Report		Stadium: Reach 11 Sports Complex; Phoenix, Arizona

10:00am MST	JMU	CANCELLED	Arkansas	Field 5
Fri, November 23		Report		Stadium: Reach 11 Sports Complex; Phoenix, Arizona

10:00am MST	UW Milwaukee	CANCELLED	Cal Poly “B”	Field 6
Fri, November 23		Report		Stadium: Reach 11 Sports Complex; Phoenix, Arizona

Group F
Pos	Team	Pld	W	D	L	GF	GA	GD	Pts	Qualification
1	Kansas	2	2	0	0	4	1	+3	6	Cancelled prior to conclusion of all games
2	Texas Tech	2	0	2	0	2	2	0	2	Cancelled prior to conclusion of all games
3	Colorado “Black”	2	0	1	1	1	2	−1	1	Cancelled prior to conclusion of all games
4	Cal State Fullerton	2	0	1	1	2	4	−2	1	Cancelled prior to conclusion of all games

Scores

9:45am MST	Texas Tech	1–1	Colorado “Black”	Field 8
Thu, November 21		Report		Stadium: Reach 11 Sports Complex; Phoenix, Arizona

9:45am MST	Kansas	3–1	Cal State Fullerton	Field 9
Thu, November 21		Report		Stadium: Reach 11 Sports Complex; Phoenix, Arizona

4:45pm MST	Cal State Fullerton	1–1	Texas Tech	Field 8
Thu, November 21		Report		Stadium: Reach 11 Sports Complex; Phoenix, Arizona

4:45pm MST	Colorado “Black”	0–1	Kansas	Field 9
Thu, November 21		Report		Stadium: Reach 11 Sports Complex; Phoenix, Arizona

10:00am MST	Texas Tech	CANCELLED	Kansas	Field 8
Fri, November 23		Report		Stadium: Reach 11 Sports Complex; Phoenix, Arizona

10:00am MST	Cal State Fullerton	CANCELLED	Colorado “Black”	Field 9
Fri, November 23		Report		Stadium: Reach 11 Sports Complex; Phoenix, Arizona

=== Women's open ===
Group A
Pos	Team	Pld	W	D	L	GF	GA	GD	Pts	Qualification
1	Boston College	2	2	0	0	9	1	+8	6	Cancelled prior to conclusion of all games
2	JMU	2	1	0	1	2	1	+1	3	Cancelled prior to conclusion of all games
3	Northern Arizona	2	1	0	1	2	4	−2	3	Cancelled prior to conclusion of all games
4	Iowa State	2	0	0	2	0	7	−7	0	Cancelled prior to conclusion of all games

Scores

11:30am MST	JMU	2–0	Iowa State	Field 2
Thu, November 21		Report		Stadium: Reach 11 Sports Complex; Phoenix, Arizona

11:30am MST	Boston College	4–1	Northern Arizona	Field 3
Thu, November 21		Report		Stadium: Reach 11 Sports Complex; Phoenix, Arizona

6:30pm MST	Northern Arizona	1–0	JMU	Field 2
Thu, November 21		Report		Stadium: Reach 11 Sports Complex; Phoenix, Arizona

6:30pm MST	Iowa State	0–5	Boston College	Field 3
Thu, November 21		Report		Stadium: Reach 11 Sports Complex; Phoenix, Arizona

12:00pm MST	JMU	CANCELLED	Boston College	Field 2
Fri, November 23		Report		Stadium: Reach 11 Sports Complex; Phoenix, Arizona

12:00pm MST	Northern Arizona	CANCELLED	Iowa State	Field 3
Fri, November 23		Report		Stadium: Reach 11 Sports Complex; Phoenix, Arizona

Group B
Pos	Team	Pld	W	D	L	GF	GA	GD	Pts	Qualification
1	Virginia	2	2	0	0	6	2	+4	6	Cancelled prior to conclusion of all games
2	Arizona State	2	1	0	1	4	2	+2	3	Cancelled prior to conclusion of all games
3	Texas Tech	2	1	0	1	2	4	−2	3	Cancelled prior to conclusion of all games
4	Denver	2	0	0	2	2	6	−4	0	Cancelled prior to conclusion of all games

Scores

11:30am MST	Virginia	2–0	Arizona State	Field 5
Thu, November 21		Report		Stadium: Reach 11 Sports Complex; Phoenix, Arizona

11:30am MST	Texas Tech	2–0	Denver	Field 6
Thu, November 21		Report		Stadium: Reach 11 Sports Complex; Phoenix, Arizona

6:30pm MST	Denver	2–4	Virginia	Field 5
Thu, November 21		Report		Stadium: Reach 11 Sports Complex; Phoenix, Arizona

6:30pm MST	Arizona State	4–0	Texas Tech	Field 6
Thu, November 21		Report		Stadium: Reach 11 Sports Complex; Phoenix, Arizona

12:00pm MST	Virginia	CANCELLED	Texas Tech	Field 5
Fri, November 23		Report		Stadium: Reach 11 Sports Complex; Phoenix, Arizona

12:00pm MST	Denver	CANCELLED	Arizona State	Field 6
Fri, November 23		Report		Stadium: Reach 11 Sports Complex; Phoenix, Arizona

Group C
Pos	Team	Pld	W	D	L	GF	GA	GD	Pts	Qualification
1	UC Davis	2	2	0	0	3	0	+3	6	Cancelled prior to conclusion of all games
2	Kansas	2	1	1	0	6	2	+4	4	Cancelled prior to conclusion of all games
3	Villanova	2	0	1	1	2	3	−1	1	Cancelled prior to conclusion of all games
4	Texas “B”	2	0	0	2	0	6	−6	0	Cancelled prior to conclusion of all games

Scores

11:30am MST	Kansas	4–0	Texas “B”	Field 8
Thu, November 21		Report		Stadium: Reach 11 Sports Complex; Phoenix, Arizona

11:30am MST	UC Davis	1–0	Villanova	Field 9
Thu, November 21		Report		Stadium: Reach 11 Sports Complex; Phoenix, Arizona

6:30pm MST	Villanova	2–2	Kansas	Field 8
Thu, November 21		Report		Stadium: Reach 11 Sports Complex; Phoenix, Arizona

6:30pm MST	Texas “B”	0–2	UC Davis	Field 9
Thu, November 21		Report		Stadium: Reach 11 Sports Complex; Phoenix, Arizona

12:00pm MST	Kansas	CANCELLED	UC Davis	Field 8
Fri, November 23		Report		Stadium: Reach 11 Sports Complex; Phoenix, Arizona

12:00pm MST	Villanova	CANCELLED	Texas “B”	Field 9
Fri, November 23		Report		Stadium: Reach 11 Sports Complex; Phoenix, Arizona

Group D
Pos	Team	Pld	W	D	L	GF	GA	GD	Pts	Qualification
1	UC-Berkeley	2	2	0	0	3	0	+3	6	Cancelled prior to conclusion of all games
2	UPenn	2	1	0	1	1	1	0	3	Cancelled prior to conclusion of all games
3	Miami (FL)	2	1	0	1	4	2	+2	3	Cancelled prior to conclusion of all games
4	UW Milwaukee	2	0	0	2	1	6	−5	0	Cancelled prior to conclusion of all games

Scores

1:15pm MST	UC-Berkeley	2–0	UW Milwaukee	Field 2
Thu, November 21		Report		Stadium: Reach 11 Sports Complex; Phoenix, Arizona

1:15pm MST	Miami (FL)	0–1	UPenn	Field 3
Thu, November 21		Report		Stadium: Reach 11 Sports Complex; Phoenix, Arizona

8:15pm MST	UPenn	0–1	UC-Berkeley	Field 2
Thu, November 21		Report		Stadium: Reach 11 Sports Complex; Phoenix, Arizona

8:15pm MST	UW Milwaukee	1–4	Miami (FL)	Field 3
Thu, November 21		Report		Stadium: Reach 11 Sports Complex; Phoenix, Arizona

2:00pm MST	UC-Berkeley	CANCELLED	Miami (FL)	Field 2
Fri, November 23		Report		Stadium: Reach 11 Sports Complex; Phoenix, Arizona

2:00pm MST	UPenn	CANCELLED	UW Milwaukee	Field 3
Fri, November 23		Report		Stadium: Reach 11 Sports Complex; Phoenix, Arizona

Group E
Pos	Team	Pld	W	D	L	GF	GA	GD	Pts	Qualification
1	Cornell	2	1	1	0	2	1	+1	4	Cancelled prior to conclusion of all games
2	Colorado “Black”	2	0	2	0	2	2	0	2	Cancelled prior to conclusion of all games
3	Vanderbilt	2	0	2	0	1	1	0	2	Cancelled prior to conclusion of all games
4	Mary Washington	2	0	1	1	0	1	−1	1	Cancelled prior to conclusion of all games

Scores

1:15pm MST	Cornell	1–0	Mary Washington	Field 5
Thu, November 21		Report		Stadium: Reach 11 Sports Complex; Phoenix, Arizona

1:15pm MST	Vanderbilt	1–1	Colorado “Black”	Field 6
Thu, November 21		Report		Stadium: Reach 11 Sports Complex; Phoenix, Arizona

8:15pm MST	Colorado “Black”	1–1	Cornell	Field 5
Thu, November 21		Report		Stadium: Reach 11 Sports Complex; Phoenix, Arizona

8:15pm MST	Mary Washington	0–0	Vanderbilt	Field 6
Thu, November 21		Report		Stadium: Reach 11 Sports Complex; Phoenix, Arizona

2:00pm MST	Cornell	CANCELLED	Vanderbilt	Field 5
Fri, November 23		Report		Stadium: Reach 11 Sports Complex; Phoenix, Arizona

2:00pm MST	Colorado “Black”	CANCELLED	Mary Washington	Field 6
Fri, November 23		Report		Stadium: Reach 11 Sports Complex; Phoenix, Arizona

Group F
Pos	Team	Pld	W	D	L	GF	GA	GD	Pts	Qualification
1	Colorado Mines	2	1	1	0	1	0	+1	4	Cancelled prior to conclusion of all games
2	San Diego State	2	1	1	0	1	0	+1	4	Cancelled prior to conclusion of all games
3	Northeastern	2	1	0	1	3	1	+2	3	Cancelled prior to conclusion of all games
4	Wash U	2	0	0	2	0	4	−4	0	Cancelled prior to conclusion of all games

Scores

1:15pm MST	Northeastern	0–1	Colorado Mines	Field 8
Thu, November 21		Report		Stadium: Reach 11 Sports Complex; Phoenix, Arizona

1:15pm MST	San Diego State	1–0	Wash U	Field 9
Thu, November 21		Report		Stadium: Reach 11 Sports Complex; Phoenix, Arizona

8:15pm MST	Wash U	0–3	Northeastern	Field 8
Thu, November 21		Report		Stadium: Reach 11 Sports Complex; Phoenix, Arizona

8:15pm MST	Colorado Mines	0–0	San Diego State	Field 9
Thu, November 21		Report		Stadium: Reach 11 Sports Complex; Phoenix, Arizona

2:00pm MST	Northeastern	CANCELLED	San Diego State	Field 8
Fri, November 23		Report		Stadium: Reach 11 Sports Complex; Phoenix, Arizona

2:00pm MST	Wash U	CANCELLED	Colorado Mines	Field 9
Fri, November 23		Report		Stadium: Reach 11 Sports Complex; Phoenix, Arizona

== Tournament bracket ==
No knockout games were able to be played due to the rain. Due to all championship group stage games finishing prior to the rain, the theoretical knockout matchups were set.

=== Men's championship ===
Sweet 16
Fri • 10:00am • Field 11
Rice
Cincinnati
Fri • 10:00am • Field 12
Michigan State
Kansas State
Fri • 10:00am • Field 13
Georgia
Florida
Fri • 10:00am • Field 14
Weber State
UC-Santa Barbara
Fri • 12:00pm • Field 11
Ohio State
Texas A&M
Fri • 12:00pm • Field 12
Illinois
Missouri
Fri • 12:00pm • Field 13
Colorado State
Cal Poly
Fri • 12:00pm • Field 14
UC-Davis
Penn State

Quarterfinals	Semifinals
Fri • 4:00pm • Field 11
Sat • 10:00am • Field 15
CANCELLED
Fri • 4:00pm • Field 12
CANCELLED
Fri • 6:00pm • Field 11
Sat • 10:00am • Field 16
CANCELLED
Fri • 6:00pm • Field 12

Final
Sat • 5:00pm • Field 16

==== Men's consolation ====
Quarterfinals
Fri • 4:00pm • Field 2
Virginia Tech
Michigan
Fri • 4:00pm • Field 3
UTEP
Northeastern
Fri • 6:00pm • Field 2
Colorado Mines
Colorado
Fri • 6:00pm • Field 3
Delaware
Texas

Semifinals
Sat • 8:00am • Field 15
CANCELLED
Sat • 8:00am • Field 16

Final
Sat • 1:00pm • Field 11

=== Women's championship ===
Sweet 16
Fri • 10:00am • Field 15
Florida
Texas A&M
Fri • 10:00am • Field 16
North Carolina
Missouri
Fri • 10:00am • Field 17
Colorado State
Miami (OH)
Fri • 10:00am • Field 18
Cal Poly
UCLA
Fri • 12:00pm • Field 15
Pittsburgh
Illinois
Fri • 12:00pm • Field 16
Penn State
Ohio State
Fri • 12:00pm • Field 17
UC-Santa Barbara
Michigan
Fri • 12:00pm • Field 18
Delaware
Texas

Quarterfinals	Semifinals
Fri • 4:00pm • Field 13
Sat • 10:00am • Field 17
CANCELLED
Fri • 4:00pm • Field 14
CANCELLED
Fri • 6:00pm • Field 13
Sat • 10:00am • Field 18
CANCELLED
Fri • 6:00pm • Field 14

Final
Sat • 3:00pm • Field 16

==== Women's consolation ====
Quarterfinals
Fri • 4:00pm • Field 5
Salt Lake CC
Air Force
Fri • 4:00pm • Field 6
Virginia Tech
Colorado
Fri • 6:00pm • Field 5
Dayton
USC
Fri • 6:00pm • Field 6
Baylor
Clemson

Semifinals
Sat • 8:00am • Field 17
CANCELLED
Sat • 8:00am • Field 18

Final
Sat • 1:00pm • Field 12

=== Men's open ===
Quarterfinals
Fri • 4:00pm • Field 15
Fri • 4:00pm • Field 16
Fri • 4:00pm • Field 17
Fri • 4:00pm • Field 18

Semifinals
Sat • 8:00am • Field 11
CANCELLED
Sat • 8:00am • Field 12

Final
Sat • 1:00pm • Field 14

=== Women's open ===
Quarterfinals
Fri • 8:00pm • Field 15
Fri • 8:00pm • Field 16
Fri • 8:00pm • Field 17
Fri • 8:00pm • Field 18

Semifinals
Sat • 8:00am • Field 13
CANCELLED
Sat • 8:00am • Field 14

Final
Sat • 1:00pm • Field 13
