= National Intramural and Recreational Sports Association =

Sports regulation organization

National Intramural-Recreational Sports Association
- Abbreviation: NIRSA
- Formation: February 22, 1950
- Legal status: Association
- Purpose: building intramural/recreational sports and fitness programs and services
- Headquarters: Corvallis, Oregon, United States
- Members: 700 schools/institutions, conferences, or other associations
- President: Erin Patchett
- Website: nirsa.net

The National Intramural-Recreational Sports Association (NIRSA) is an organization which regulates various sports through the collegiate systems across the United States and Canada. NIRSA serves students who play at the university varsity or club level in athletic sports, but do not participate in the NCAA, NAIA, USports or other sports affiliates.

In addition to providing resources for Campus Recreation Programs through conferences, workshops and symposiums, NIRSA is the host of the National Championship Series events, which offers regional and national extramural tournaments in the sports of flag football, basketball, soccer and tennis.

== History ==
Dr. William Wasson founded NIRSA in 1950 when he presented his study on intramural programs entitled "A Comparative Study of Intramural Programs in Negro Colleges." This led to the formation of the National Intramural Association (NIA), NIRSA's original title.

== Core competencies ==
NIRSA has eight confirmed core competencies: programming, philosophy and theory, personal and professional qualities, legal liabilities and risk management, human resources management, facility management, planning and design, business management, and research and evaluation. The competencies help professionals to attain new skills, and plan, assess, and refine programs.

== Leadership Groups ==
2024-25 Board of Directors
Name	Position	School
Erin Patchett	President	Colorado State University
Lashica Thomas	President Designee	Columbus State University
Andre Love	President Elect	Ohio State University
Abby Whaley	At Large Director	Purdue University
Kevin Martin	At Large Director	Texas A&M Univ, Corpus Christi
Dexter Shorter	At Large Director	Penn State University
Nicole Olmeda	Annual Director	Univ. Texas-Austin
Rachael Finley	Annual Director	Rachael Finley Coaching and Consulting
Pam Watts	Secretary	NIRSA Executive Director

2024-25 Member Network
Name	Position	School
Brooke Turner	Member Network Chair	University of Alabama
Jaclyn Kirko	Student Leader	West Virginia University
Scott Flickinger	Region 1 Rep	Cornell University
Phoebe Kurniawan	Region 1 Student Leader	Rowan University
Marty Dempsy	Region 2 Rep	University of Florida
Fauz Adeyinka	Region 2 Student Leader	Clemson University
Chris Crume	Region 3 Rep	Denison University
Riley Feiner	Region 3 Student Leader	Ohio State University
Armando Espinoza	Region 4 Rep	Kansas State University
Kayla Polcano	Region 4 Student Leader	Oklahoma State University
TJ Hill	Region 5 Rep	Colorado State
Owen Woodman	Region 5 Student Leader	University of Colorado Boulder
Ryan Kirchner	Region 6 Rep	University of Utah
Michaela Richman	Region 6 Student Leader	University of Nevada Las Vegas
Megan Locker	Canadian Rep	Brock University
Jack Parry	Canadian Student Leader	Brock University
Dexter Shorter	Board Liaison	Penn State University
David Davenport	Past Presidents Rep	Austin Peay State University

== Professional development ==
NIRSA provides a variety of professional development and educational opportunities for members including their Annual Campus Recreation and Wellness Expo.

== Championship Series ==
The NIRSA Championship Series gives American participants of collegiate recreational sports, also known as "club sports", an opportunity to compete and connect with skilled peers from other schools.

=== Current offered sports ===
- National soccer championships
- National flag football championships
- UTSA tennis on campus
- National basketball championships
