= 2025 SCSA Regional Tournament =

- Association: NIRSA
- League: Southeast Collegiate Soccer Alliance
- Sport: Soccer
- Site: Bryan Park Soccer Complex; Browns Summit, NC
- Duration: October 31 – November 2, 2025
- Teams: 16 (men's); 12 (women's)

Men's Championship Division
- Score: 2–1
- Champion: Georgia Tech (1st title, 2nd title game)
- Runners-up: Virginia Tech (6th title game)
- Season MVP: Oskar Bringle (Georgia Tech)

Women's Championship Division
- Score: 1–0
- Champion: Tennessee (1st title, 1st title game)
- Runners-up: Virginia Tech (7th title game)
- Season MVP: Natalie Druger (Tennessee)

Southeast Collegiate Soccer Alliance seasons
- ← 2024 2026 →

The 2025 Southeast Collegiate Soccer Alliance Regional Tournament was the 15th edition of the Southeast Collegiate Soccer Alliance's postseason club soccer tournament, which was held at Bryan Park Soccer Complex in Browns Summit, NC from October 31 – November 2, 2025. A tournament was held for each the men's and women's divisions, with each tournament champion and runner-up receiving an automatic bid to the 2025 NIRSA National Soccer Championships' championship division. The remaining bid for each division was given out based on power rankings.

== Format ==
The tournament consisted of twelve women's teams and sixteen men's teams. Each divisional champion received an automatic bid (6 for the women and 8 for the men) with the remaining wild card teams being the next highest power ranked teams that had not already qualified. Power ranking utilized the three points for a win system for the 6 divisional games and up to 4 additional regional matches. Teams were divided into groups based on power ranking with divisional champs getting an additional 10 points exclusively for seeding.

For the men's division group stage, the 16 teams were split into four groups of four teams each. Each team played every other team in their group meaning a total of 6 games were played within a group. For the women's division group stage, the 12 teams were split into four groups of three teams each. Each team played 2 games against teams in their group. The top two teams from each group advanced to the single elimination quarterfinal round.

Pool play games were two 35-minute halves, separated by a seven-minute halftime and utilized the three points for a win system. After pool play, the two highest ranked teams from each group advanced to their respective gender division's knockout stage.

Tie-breaking criteria for group play
The ranking of teams in each group was based on the following criteria in order:
1. Highest number of points
2. Winner of head-to-head competition
3. Greatest goal difference
  - Maximum ± 5 goal difference per match
4. Least coals allowed
5. Most shutouts
6. Penalty shootout

Knockout stage games also consisted of two 35-minute halves. The quarterfinals were separated by a seven-minute halftime while the semifinals and finals had a ten-minute halftime. Knockout stage games needed to declare a winner. If a knockout-stage game was tied at the end of regulation, overtime would begin. Overtime consisted of one, 15-minute, golden-goal period. If still tied after overtime, kicks from the mark would determine the winner.

== Participants ==
=== Men's ===
Divisional champions
Division	Team	Appearance	Last bid
Atlantic North	Virginia	13th	2023
Atlantic South	South Carolina	3rd	2014
Coastal North	Florida	14th	2024
Coastal South	UCF	13th	2024
Mid-Atlantic	Davidson	2nd	2024
Mountain East	Emory	3rd	2021
Mountain North	Tennessee	7th	2024
Mountain West	Auburn	8th	2024

Wild cards
Division	Team	Appearance	Last bid
Mountain North	Kentucky	5th	2024
Mountain West	Georgia Tech	10th	2024
Atlantic North	North Carolina	15th	2024
Atlantic South	Miami	5th	2022
Mid-Atlantic	High Point	1st	Never
Coastal North	UNC-Wilmington	7th	2023
Coastal South	Virginia Tech	11th	2024
Mid-Atlantic	Mercer	1st	Never

=== Women's ===
Divisional champions
Division	Team	Appearance	Last bid
Florida	Tampa	3rd	2024
North	Virginia Tech	13th	2022
Northeast	North Carolina	15th	2024
Northwest	Vanderbilt	11th	2024
Southeast	Clemson	11th	2024
Southwest	Auburn	5th	2024

Wild cards
Division	Team	Appearance	Last bid
Northwest	Tennessee	5th	2024
North	Virginia	14th	2024
Southeast	South Carolina	4th	2024
Southwest	Georgia	9th	2024
Northeast	NC State	11th	2024
North	William & Mary	3rd	2022

== Group stage ==
Note: Scores obtained through SCSA's IMLeagues, however uncited because it's a primary source and generally unreliable.

=== Men's ===
Group A
Pos	Team	Pld	W	L	D	GF	GA	GD	Pts	Qualification
1	Georgia Tech	3	2	0	1	7	3	+4	7	Advanced to knockout stage
2	South Carolina	3	2	1	0	3	2	+1	6	Advanced to knockout stage
3	Miami	3	1	2	0	1	4	-3	3	
4	Davidson	3	0	2	1	2	4	-2	1	

Scores

7:00pm EST	Davidson	0–1	Miami	Field 2
Fri, October 31		Report		Stadium: Bryan Park; Browns Summit, NC

7:00pm EST	South Carolina	1–2	Georgia Tech	Field 13
Fri, October 31		Report		Stadium: Bryan Park; Browns Summit, NC

9:15am EST	South Carolina	1–0	Davidson	Field 3
Sat, November 1		Report		Stadium: Bryan Park; Browns Summit, NC

9:15am EST	Georgia Tech	3–0	Miami	Field 7
Sat, November 1		Report		Stadium: Bryan Park; Browns Summit, NC

1:15pm EST	Davidson	2–2	Georgia Tech	Field 8
Sat, November 1		Report		Stadium: Bryan Park; Browns Summit, NC

1:15pm EST	Miami	0–1	South Carolina	Field 4
Sat, November 1		Report		Stadium: Bryan Park; Browns Summit, NC

Group B
Pos	Team	Pld	W	L	D	GF	GA	GD	Pts	Qualification
1	Auburn	3	3	0	0	5	0	+5	9	Advanced to knockout stage
2	Virginia	3	2	1	0	4	2	+2	6	Advanced to knockout stage
3	Kentucky	3	1	2	0	3	4	-1	3	
4	Mercer	3	0	3	0	1	7	-6	0	

Scores

7:00pm EST	Virginia	3–1	Mercer	Field 12
Fri, October 31		Report		Stadium: Bryan Park; Browns Summit, NC

7:00pm EST	Auburn	3–0	Kentucky	Field 7
Fri, October 31		Report		Stadium: Bryan Park; Browns Summit, NC

9:15am EST	Auburn	1–0	Virginia	Field 8
Sat, November 1		Report		Stadium: Bryan Park; Browns Summit, NC

9:15am EST	Kentucky	3–0	Mercer	Field 10
Sat, November 1		Report		Stadium: Bryan Park; Browns Summit, NC

1:15pm EST	Virginia	1–0	Kentucky	Field 2
Sat, November 1		Report		Stadium: Bryan Park; Browns Summit, NC

1:15pm EST	Mercer	0–1; Forfeit	Auburn	Field 3
Sat, November 1		Report		Stadium: Bryan Park; Browns Summit, NC

Group C
Pos	Team	Pld	W	L	D	GF	GA	GD	Pts	Qualification
1	UCF	3	2	1	0	7	2	+5	6	Advanced to knockout stage
2	North Carolina	3	2	1	0	8	3	+5	6	Advanced to knockout stage
3	Florida	3	2	1	0	7	5	+2	6	
4	High Point	3	0	3	0	1	13	-12	0	

Scores

8:30pm EST	Florida	4–1	High Point	Field 7
Fri, October 31		Report		Stadium: Bryan Park; Browns Summit, NC

8:30pm EST	UCF	2–0	North Carolina	Field 3
Fri, October 31		Report		Stadium: Bryan Park; Browns Summit, NC

10:45am EST	UCF	1–2	Florida	Field 2
Sat, November 1		Report		Stadium: Bryan Park; Browns Summit, NC

10:45am EST	North Carolina	5–0	High Point	Field 3
Sat, November 1		Report		Stadium: Bryan Park; Browns Summit, NC

2:45pm EST	Florida	1–3	North Carolina	Field 4
Sat, November 1		Report		Stadium: Bryan Park; Browns Summit, NC

2:45pm EST	High Point	0–4	UCF	Field 10
Sat, November 1		Report		Stadium: Bryan Park; Browns Summit, NC

Group D
Pos	Team	Pld	W	L	D	GF	GA	GD	Pts	Qualification
1	Virginia Tech	3	2	0	1	4	1	+3	7	Advanced to knockout stage
2	Tennessee	3	2	1	0	2	1	+1	6	Advanced to knockout stage
3	UNC-Wilmington	3	1	1	1	5	4	+1	4	
4	Emory	3	0	3	0	2	7	-5	0	

Scores

8:30pm EST	Tennessee	1–0	UNC-Wilmington	Field 13
Fri, October 31		Report		Stadium: Bryan Park; Browns Summit, NC

8:30pm EST	Emory	0–2	Virginia Tech	Field 8
Fri, October 31		Report		Stadium: Bryan Park; Browns Summit, NC

10:45am EST	Emory	0–1	Tennessee	Field 7
Sat, November 1		Report		Stadium: Bryan Park; Browns Summit, NC

10:45am EST	Virginia Tech	1–1	UNC-Wilmington	Field 4
Sat, November 1		Report		Stadium: Bryan Park; Browns Summit, NC

2:45pm EST	Tennessee	0–1	Virginia Tech	Field 3
Sat, November 1		Report		Stadium: Bryan Park; Browns Summit, NC

2:45pm EST	UNC-Wilmington	4–2	Emory	Field 8
Sat, November 1		Report		Stadium: Bryan Park; Browns Summit, NC

=== Women's ===
Group A
Pos	Team	Pld	W	L	D	GF	GA	GD	Pts	Qualification
1	Tennessee	2	2	0	0	5	0	+5	6	Advanced to knockout stage
2	Vanderbilt	2	0	1	1	0	1	-1	1	Advanced to knockout stage
3	Virginia	2	0	1	1	0	4	-4	1	

Scores

7:00pm EST	Vanderbilt	0–0	Virginia	Field 8
Fri, October 31		Report		Stadium: Bryan Park; Browns Summit, NC

9:15am EST	Virginia	0–4	Tennessee	Field 4
Sat, November 1		Report		Stadium: Bryan Park; Browns Summit, NC

1:15pm EST	Tennessee	1–0	Vanderbilt	Field 7
Sat, November 1		Report		Stadium: Bryan Park; Browns Summit, NC

Group B
Pos	Team	Pld	W	L	D	GF	GA	GD	Pts	Qualification
1	North Carolina	2	2	0	0	4	2	+2	6	Advanced to knockout stage
2	Georgia	2	1	1	0	3	3	0	3	Advanced to knockout stage
3	South Carolina	2	0	2	0	2	4	-2	0	

Scores

7:00pm EST	North Carolina	2–1	Georgia	Field 3
Fri, October 31		Report		Stadium: Bryan Park; Browns Summit, NC

9:15am EST	Georgia	2–1	South Carolina	Field 2
Sat, November 1		Report		Stadium: Bryan Park; Browns Summit, NC

1:15pm EST	South Carolina	1–2	North Carolina	Field 10
Sat, November 1		Report		Stadium: Bryan Park; Browns Summit, NC

Group C
Pos	Team	Pld	W	L	D	GF	GA	GD	Pts	Qualification
1	Virginia Tech	2	1	0	1	1	0	+1	4	Advanced to knockout stage
2	Clemson	2	1	0	1	1	0	+1	4	Advanced to knockout stage
3	NC State	2	0	2	0	0	2	-2	0	

Scores

8:30pm EST	Clemson	1–0	NC State	Field 2
Fri, October 31		Report		Stadium: Bryan Park; Browns Summit, NC

10:45am EST	NC State	0–1	Virginia Tech	Field 10
Sat, November 1		Report		Stadium: Bryan Park; Browns Summit, NC

2:45pm EST	Virginia Tech	0–0	Clemson	Field 7
Sat, November 1		Report		Stadium: Bryan Park; Browns Summit, NC

6:00pm EST	Virginia Tech	1st/2nd Seeding (5–4 p)	Clemson	Field 4
Sat, November 1		Report		Stadium: Bryan Park; Browns Summit, NC

Group D
Pos	Team	Pld	W	L	D	GF	GA	GD	Pts	Qualification
1	Auburn	2	2	0	0	4	0	+4	6	Advanced to knockout stage
2	Tampa	2	1	1	0	3	1	+2	1	Advanced to knockout stage
3	William & Mary	2	0	2	0	0	6	-6	1	

Scores

8:30pm EST	Auburn	3–0	William & Mary	Field 12
Fri, October 31		Report		Stadium: Bryan Park; Browns Summit, NC

10:45am EST	William & Mary	0–3	Tampa	Field 8
Sat, November 1		Report		Stadium: Bryan Park; Browns Summit, NC

2:45pm EST	Tampa	0–1	Auburn	Field 2
Sat, November 1		Report		Stadium: Bryan Park; Browns Summit, NC

== Tournament bracket ==
=== Men's ===
Quarterfinals
Sat • 5:00pm • Field 2
Georgia Tech	2
Virginia	0
Sat • 5:00pm • Field 3
Auburn	2
South Carolina	0
Sat • 6:30pm • Field 3
UCF	2
Tennessee	0
Sat • 6:30pm • Field 7
Virginia Tech	1
North Carolina	0

Semifinals
Sun • 8:00am • Field 2
Georgia Tech	3
Auburn	1
Sun • 8:00am • Field 3
UCF	1
Virginia Tech	3

Final
Sun • 11:00am • Field 2
Georgia Tech	2
Virginia Tech	1

=== Women's ===
Quarterfinals
Sat • 5:00pm • Field 7
Tennessee	4
Georgia	1
Sat • 5:00pm • Field 8
North Carolina	0
Vanderbilt	1
Sat • 6:30pm • Field 2
Virginia Tech	3
Tampa	0
Sat • 6:30pm • Field 8
Auburn	2
Clemson	0

Semifinals
Sun • 8:00am • Field 7
Tennessee	1
Vanderbilt	0
Sun • 8:00am • Field 8
Virginia Tech	1
Auburn	0

Final
Sun • 11:00am • Field 3
Tennessee	1
Virginia Tech	0

== All-tournament teams ==
Note: Only semifinalist players were eligible for selections

Key
MVP
Best Defender

=== Men's championship ===
Name	Team	Pos
Oskar Bringle	Georgia Tech	Offense
Cole Kettner	Georgia Tech	Defense
Jared McCall	Georgia Tech	Goalkeeper
Gabriel Mawanda	Georgia Tech	Offense
Peighhton Raisey	UCF	Offense
Jack Pucciano	Auburn	Offense
Andrew Fiocca	Virginia Tech	Defense
Hogan Schrader	Virginia Tech	Defense

=== Women's championship ===
Name	Team	Pos.
Natalie Druger	Tennessee	Offense
Amelie D'Agnillo	Virginia Tech	Defense
Alina Pope	Tennessee	Goalkeeper
Ally Ouano	Vanderbilt	Offense
Caroline Tulk	Virginia Tech	Offense
Mira Sansone	Virginia Tech	Offense
Ava Cole	Vanderbilt	Defense
Emery Arsma	Auburn	Defense

== National Championship performance ==
=== Men's ===
Team	Qualification	App	Last bid	Performance
Georgia Tech	Tournament champion	6th	2024	Quarterfinalist (1–2 v Colorado)
Virginia Tech	Tournament runner-up	13th	2024	Sweet 16 (0–1 v BYU)
Auburn	Highest Power; Rank remaining	5th	2012	Sweet 16 (1–3 v UCLA)
UCF	National wildcard	6th	2024	Sweet 16 (0(3)–0(4) v Georgia Tech)
Virginia	National wildcard	11th	2018	Sweet 16 (0–1 v Texas)

=== Women's ===
Team	Qualification	App	Last bid	Performance
Tennessee	Tournament champion	3rd	1996	Semifinalist (1–2 v Michigan State)
Virginia Tech	Tournament runner-up	18th	2022	Consolation Champion (0(4)–0(3) v Wisconsin)
Auburn	Highest Power; Rank remaining	2nd	2024	Sweet 16 (1–3 v San Diego State)
North Carolina	National wildcard	20th	2024	Sweet 16 (0–1 v Texas)
Vanderbilt	National wildcard	3rd	2023	Consolation Quarterfinalist (0–2 v Texas A&M)
