= 2024 SCSA Regional Tournament =

- Association: NIRSA
- League: Southeast Collegiate Soccer Alliance
- Sport: Soccer
- Site: Jonesville Soccer Complex; Gainesville, FL
- Duration: November 1–3, 2024
- Teams: 16 (men's); 12 (women's)

Men's Championship Division
- Score: 4-0
- Champion: UCF (2nd title, 3rd title game)
- Runners-up: Georgia Tech (1st title game)
- Season MVP: Mateo Hurtado (UCF)

Women's Championship Division
- Score: 4-0
- Champion: Georgia (2nd title, 2nd title game)
- Runners-up: Auburn (1st title game)
- Season MVP: Kelly Humphrey (Georgia)

Southeast Collegiate Soccer Alliance seasons
- ← 2023 2025 →

The 2024 Southeast Collegiate Soccer Alliance Regional Tournament was the 14th edition of the Southeast Collegiate Soccer Alliance's postseason club soccer tournament, which was held at Jonesville Soccer Complex in Gainesville, Florida from November 1–3, 2024. A tournament was held for each the men's and women's divisions, with each tournament champion and runner-up receiving an automatic bid to the 2024 NIRSA National Soccer Championships' championship division. The remaining bid for each division was given out based on RPI, with a special consideration to this tournament's performance.

== Format ==
The tournament consisted of twelve women's teams and sixteen men's teams. Each divisional champion received an automatic bid (6 for the women and 8 for the men) with the remaining wild card teams being the next highest RPI ranked teams that had not already qualified. Teams were divided into groups based on RPI.

For the men's division group stage, the 16 teams were split into four groups of four teams each. Each team played every other team in their group meaning a total of 6 games were played within a group. For the women's division group stage, the 12 teams were split into four groups of three teams each. Each team played 2 games against teams in their group. The top two teams from each group advanced to the single elimination quarterfinal round.

Pool play games were two 35-minute halves, separated by a seven-minute halftime and utilized the three points for a win system. After pool play, the two highest ranked teams from each group advanced to their respective gender division's knockout stage.

Tie-breaking criteria for group play
The ranking of teams in each group was based on the following criteria in order:
1. Highest number of points
2. Winner of head-to-head competition
3. Greatest goal difference
  - Maximum ± 5 goal difference per match
4. Most goals scored
5. Most shutouts
6. Coin flip (No penalty shootout for group stage standings)

Knockout stage games also consisted of two 35-minute halves. The quarterfinals were separated by a seven-minute halftime while the semifinals and finals had a ten-minute halftime. Knockout stage games needed to declare a winner. If a knockout-stage game was tied at the end of regulation, overtime would begin. Overtime consisted of one, 15-minute, golden-goal period. If still tied after overtime, kicks from the mark would determine the winner.

== Participants ==
=== Men's ===
Divisional champions
| Division | Team | Appearance | Last bid |
|---|---|---|---|
| Atlantic North | Virginia Tech | 10th | 2023 |
| Atlantic South | North Carolina | 14th | 2023 |
| Coastal North | Florida | 13th | 2023 |
| Coastal South | UCF | 12th | 2023 |
| Mid-Atlantic | Wake Forest | 2nd | 2022 |
| Mountain East | Georgia Tech | 9th | 2023 |
| Mountain North | Tennessee | 6th | 2023 |
| Mountain West | Alabama | 5th | 2023 |

Wild cards
| Division | Team | Appearance | Last bid |
|---|---|---|---|
| Mountain North | Kentucky | 4th | 2023 |
| Mountain West | Auburn | 7th | 2022 |
| Atlantic North | William & Mary | 5th | 2023 |
| Atlantic South | NC State | 8th | 2023 |
| Mid-Atlantic | Davidson | 1st | Never |
| Coastal North | Florida State | 6th | 2023 |
| Coastal South | USF | 7th | 2023 |
| Mid-Atlantic | Elon | 5th | 2023 |

=== Women's ===
Divisional champions
| Division | Team | Appearance | Last bid |
|---|---|---|---|
| Florida | Florida State | 7th | 2022 |
| North | Virginia | 13th | 2023 |
| Northeast | North Carolina | 14th | 2023 |
| Northwest | Tennessee | 4th | 2023 |
| Southeast | South Carolina | 3rd | 2023 |
| Southwest | Auburn | 4th | 2014 |

Wild cards
| Division | Team | Appearance | Last bid |
|---|---|---|---|
| Southwest | Georgia | 8th | 2023 |
| Northwest | Vanderbilt | 10th | 2023 |
| Southwest | Georgia Tech | 6th | 2022 |
| Northeast | NC State | 10th | 2023 |
| Florida | Tampa | 2nd | 2023 |
| Florida | Florida | 14th | 2023 |

== Group stage ==
Note: Scores obtained through SCSA's IMLeagues, however uncited because it's a primary source and generally unreliable.

=== Men's ===
Group A
| Pos | Team | Pld | W | L | D | GF | GA | GD | Pts | Qualification |
|---|---|---|---|---|---|---|---|---|---|---|
| 1 | Virginia Tech | 3 | 3 | 0 | 0 | 6 | 0 | +6 | 9 | Advanced to knockout stage |
| 2 | Florida State | 3 | 2 | 1 | 0 | 2 | 1 | +1 | 6 | Advanced to knockout stage |
| 3 | Alabama | 3 | 1 | 2 | 0 | 1 | 3 | -2 | 3 | |
| 4 | Elon | 3 | 0 | 3 | 0 | 0 | 5 | -5 | 0 | |

Scores

| 7:00pm EST | Florida State | 1–0 | Elon | Field 2 |
| Fri, November 1 | | | | Stadium: Jonesville Sports Complex; Gainesville, FL |

| 7:00pm EST | Virginia Tech | 2–0 | Alabama | Field 1 |
| Fri, November 1 | | | | Stadium: Jonesville Sports Complex; Gainesville, FL |

| 8:30am EST | Alabama | 1–0 | Elon | Field 3 |
| Sat, November 2 | | | | Stadium: Jonesville Sports Complex; Gainesville, FL |

| 8:30am EST | Virginia Tech | 1–0 | Florida State | Field 2 |
| Sat, November 2 | | | | Stadium: Jonesville Sports Complex; Gainesville, FL |

| 11:30am EST | Virginia Tech | 3–0 | Elon | Field 4 |
| Sat, November 2 | | | | Stadium: Jonesville Sports Complex; Gainesville, FL |

| 11:30am EST | Alabama | 0–1 | Florida State | Field 5 |
| Sat, November 2 | | | | Stadium: Jonesville Sports Complex; Gainesville, FL |

Group B
| Pos | Team | Pld | W | L | D | GF | GA | GD | Pts | Qualification |
|---|---|---|---|---|---|---|---|---|---|---|
| 1 | UCF | 3 | 2 | 0 | 1 | 7 | 0 | +6 | 7 | Advanced to knockout stage |
| 2 | North Carolina | 3 | 2 | 0 | 1 | 4 | 2 | +2 | 7 | Advanced to knockout stage |
| 3 | Auburn | 3 | 1 | 2 | 0 | 3 | 4 | -1 | 3 | |
| 4 | Davidson | 3 | 0 | 3 | 0 | 0 | 8 | -7 | 0 | |

Scores

| 7:00pm EST | Davidson | 0–1 | Auburn | Field 3 |
| Fri, November 1 | | | | Stadium: Jonesville Sports Complex; Gainesville, FL |

| 7:00pm EST | North Carolina | 0–0 | UCF | Field 6 |
| Fri, November 1 | | | | Stadium: Jonesville Sports Complex; Gainesville, FL |

| 8:30am EST | North Carolina | 1–0 | Davidson | Field 4 |
| Sat, November 2 | | | | Stadium: Jonesville Sports Complex; Gainesville, FL |

| 8:30am EST | UCF | 1–0 | Auburn | Field 6 |
| Sat, November 2 | | | | Stadium: Jonesville Sports Complex; Gainesville, FL |

| 11:30am EST | UCF | 6–0 | Davidson | Field 2 |
| Sat, November 2 | | | | Stadium: Jonesville Sports Complex; Gainesville, FL |

| 11:30am EST | North Carolina | 3–2 | Auburn | Field 1 |
| Sat, November 2 | | | | Stadium: Jonesville Sports Complex; Gainesville, FL |

Group C
| Pos | Team | Pld | W | L | D | GF | GA | GD | Pts | Qualification |
|---|---|---|---|---|---|---|---|---|---|---|
| 1 | Wake Forest | 3 | 2 | 0 | 1 | 2 | 0 | +2 | 7 | Advanced to knockout stage |
| 2 | South Florida | 3 | 1 | 0 | 2 | 2 | 0 | +2 | 5 | Advanced to knockout stage |
| 3 | Florida | 3 | 1 | 2 | 0 | 3 | 4 | -1 | 3 | |
| 4 | William & Mary | 3 | 0 | 2 | 1 | 1 | 4 | -3 | 1 | |

Scores

| 8:30pm EST | Wake Forest | 1–0 | Florida | Field 3 |
| Fri, November 1 | | | | Stadium: Jonesville Sports Complex; Gainesville, FL |

| 8:30pm EST | William & Mary | 0–0 | South Florida | Field 2 |
| Fri, November 1 | | | | Stadium: Jonesville Sports Complex; Gainesville, FL |

| 10:00am EST | Wake Forest | 1–0 | William & Mary | Field 1 |
| Sat, November 2 | | | | Stadium: Jonesville Sports Complex; Gainesville, FL |

| 10:00am EST | Florida | 0–2 | South Florida | Field 2 |
| Sat, November 2 | | | | Stadium: Jonesville Sports Complex; Gainesville, FL |

| 2:00pm EST | Wake Forest | 0–0 | South Florida | Field 4 |
| Sat, November 2 | | | | Stadium: Jonesville Sports Complex; Gainesville, FL |

| 2:00pm EST | Florida | 3–1 | William & Mary | Field 2 |
| Sat, November 2 | | | | Stadium: Jonesville Sports Complex; Gainesville, FL |

Group D
| Pos | Team | Pld | W | L | D | GF | GA | GD | Pts | Qualification |
|---|---|---|---|---|---|---|---|---|---|---|
| 1 | NC State | 3 | 2 | 0 | 1 | 3 | 1 | +2 | 7 | Advanced to knockout stage |
| 2 | Georgia Tech | 3 | 1 | 0 | 2 | 4 | 3 | +1 | 5 | Advanced to knockout stage |
| 3 | Kentucky | 3 | 1 | 2 | 0 | 2 | 3 | -1 | 3 | |
| 4 | Tennessee | 3 | 0 | 2 | 1 | 1 | 3 | -2 | 1 | |

Scores

| 8:30pm EST | Tennessee | 0–1 | NC State | Field 4 |
| Fri, November 1 | | | | Stadium: Jonesville Sports Complex; Gainesville, FL |

| 8:30pm EST | Georgia Tech | 2–1 | Kentucky | Field 6 |
| Fri, November 1 | | | | Stadium: Jonesville Sports Complex; Gainesville, FL |

| 10:00am EST | NC State | 1–0 | Kentucky | Field 6 |
| Sat, November 2 | | | | Stadium: Jonesville Sports Complex; Gainesville, FL |

| 10:00am EST | Tennessee | 1–1 | Georgia Tech | Field 3 |
| Sat, November 2 | | | | Stadium: Jonesville Sports Complex; Gainesville, FL |

| 2:00pm EST | Georgia Tech | 1–1 | NC State | Field 5 |
| Sat, November 2 | | | | Stadium: Jonesville Sports Complex; Gainesville, FL |

| 2:00pm EST | Tennessee | 0–1 | Kentucky | Field 6 |
| Sat, November 2 | | | | Stadium: Jonesville Sports Complex; Gainesville, FL |

=== Women's ===
Group A
| Pos | Team | Pld | W | L | D | GF | GA | GD | Pts | Qualification |
|---|---|---|---|---|---|---|---|---|---|---|
| 1 | North Carolina | 2 | 1 | 0 | 1 | 3 | 1 | +2 | 4 | Advanced to knockout stage |
| 2 | Vanderbilt | 2 | 0 | 0 | 2 | 1 | 1 | 0 | 2 | Advanced to knockout stage |
| 3 | Florida | 2 | 0 | 1 | 1 | 0 | 2 | -2 | 1 | |

Scores

| 7:00pm EST | North Carolina | 2–0 | Florida | Field 4 |
| Fri, November 1 | | | | Stadium: Jonesville Sports Complex; Gainesville, FL |

| 8:30am EST | Vanderbilt | 0–0 | Florida | Field 1 |
| Sat, November 2 | | | | Stadium: Jonesville Sports Complex; Gainesville, FL |

| 11:30am EST | North Carolina | 1–1 | Vanderbilt | Field 3 |
| Sat, November 2 | | | | Stadium: Jonesville Sports Complex; Gainesville, FL |

Group B
| Pos | Team | Pld | W | L | D | GF | GA | GD | Pts | Qualification |
|---|---|---|---|---|---|---|---|---|---|---|
| 1 | Georgia | 2 | 2 | 0 | 0 | 5 | 0 | +5 | 6 | Advanced to knockout stage |
| 2 | Florida State | 2 | 1 | 1 | 0 | 1 | 4 | -3 | 3 | Advanced to knockout stage |
| 3 | NC State | 2 | 0 | 2 | 0 | 0 | 2 | -2 | 0 | |

Scores

| 7:00pm EST | Florida State | 0–4 | Georgia | Field 5 |
| Fri, November 1 | | | | Stadium: Jonesville Sports Complex; Gainesville, FL |

| 8:30am EST | Georgia | 1–0 | NC State | Field 5 |
| Sat, November 2 | | | | Stadium: Jonesville Sports Complex; Gainesville, FL |

| 11:30am EST | Florida State | 1–0 | NC State | Field 6 |
| Sat, November 2 | | | | Stadium: Jonesville Sports Complex; Gainesville, FL |

Group C
| Pos | Team | Pld | W | L | D | GF | GA | GD | Pts | Qualification |
|---|---|---|---|---|---|---|---|---|---|---|
| 1 | Georgia Tech | 2 | 2 | 0 | 0 | 2 | 0 | +2 | 6 | Advanced to knockout stage |
| 2 | Tampa | 2 | 1 | 1 | 0 | 2 | 1 | +1 | 3 | Advanced to knockout stage |
| 3 | Tennessee | 2 | 0 | 2 | 0 | 0 | 3 | -3 | 0 | |

Scores

| 8:30pm EST | Tampa | 0–1 | Georgia Tech | Field 1 |
| Fri, November 1 | | | | Stadium: Jonesville Sports Complex; Gainesville, FL |

| 10:00am EST | Tennessee | 0–1 | Georgia Tech | Field 4 |
| Sat, November 2 | | | | Stadium: Jonesville Sports Complex; Gainesville, FL |

| 2:00pm EST | Tampa | 2–0 | Tennessee | Field 3 |
| Sat, November 2 | | | | Stadium: Jonesville Sports Complex; Gainesville, FL |

Group D
| Pos | Team | Pld | W | L | D | GF | GA | GD | Pts | Qualification |
|---|---|---|---|---|---|---|---|---|---|---|
| 1 | Virginia | 2 | 1 | 0 | 1 | 3 | 1 | +2 | 4 | Advanced to knockout stage |
| 2 | Auburn | 2 | 0 | 0 | 2 | 1 | 1 | 0 | 2 | Advanced to knockout stage |
| 3 | South Carolina | 2 | 0 | 1 | 1 | 0 | 2 | -2 | 1 | |

Scores

| 8:30pm EST | South Carolina | 0–0 | Auburn | Field 5 |
| Fri, November 1 | | | | Stadium: Jonesville Sports Complex; Gainesville, FL |

| 10:00am EST | Virginia | 2–0 | South Carolina | Field 5 |
| Sat, November 2 | | | | Stadium: Jonesville Sports Complex; Gainesville, FL |

| 2:00pm EST | Virginia | 1–1 | Auburn | Field 1 |
| Sat, November 2 | | | | Stadium: Jonesville Sports Complex; Gainesville, FL |

== Tournament bracket ==
=== Men's ===
Quarterfinals
Sat • 4:30pm • Field 3
Virginia Tech | 1 (4)
North Carolina (pen.) | 1 (5)
Sat • 4:30pm • Field 2
UCF | 1
Florida State | 0
Sat • 6:00pm • Field 2
Wake Forest | 0
Georgia Tech (a.e.t) | 1
Sat • 6:00pm • Field 3
NC State | 1
South Florida | 2

Semifinals
Sun • 9:30am • Field 5
North Carolina | 0
UCF | 1
Sun • 9:30am • Field 2
Georgia Tech | 2
South Florida | 0

Final
Sun • 12:00pm • Field 3
UCF | 4
Georgia Tech | 0

=== Women's ===
Quarterfinals
Sun • 8:00am • Field 5
North Carolina | 1
Florida State | 0
Sun • 8:00am • Field 2
Georgia | 2
Vanderbilt | 0
Sun • 8:00am • Field 3
Georgia Tech | 1
Auburn | 2
Sun • 8:00am • Field 4
Virginia | 1
Tampa | 2

Semifinals
Sun • 10:30am • Field 3
North Carolina | 0
Georgia | 1
Sun • 10:30am • Field 4
Auburn (a.e.t) | 2
Tampa | 1

Final
Sun • 1:00pm • Field 2
Georgia | 3
Auburn | 0

== All-tournament teams ==
Note: Only semifinalist players were eligible for selections

=== Men's championship ===
| Name | Team |
|---|---|
| Mateo Hurtado (MVP) | UCF |
| Cade Greenwald | UCF |
| Sebastian Rodriguez | UCF |
| Hans Kuhnke | UCF |
| Bailey Goldstein | Georgia Tech |
| Cole Kettner | Georgia Tech |
| Kieran Ferguson | Georgia Tech |
| Zachariah Brewer | USF |
| Tyler Brett | North Carolina |

=== Women's championship ===
| # | Name | Team |
|---|---|---|
| 12 | Kelly Humphrey (MVP) | Georgia |
| 0 | Alyssa Graham | Georgia |
| 2 | Jordan Nowicki | Georgia |
| 21 | Janey Kauppinen | Georgia |
| 15 | Ella Ortbals | Auburn |
| 26 | Addy Pitts | Auburn |
| 10 | Allison Travis | North Carolina |
| 14 | Marley Mladucky | Tampa |

== National Championship performance ==
=== Men's ===
| Team | Qualification | App | Last bid | Performance |
|---|---|---|---|---|
| UCF | Tournament champion | 5th | 2021 | Sweet 16 (0–3 vs Ohio State) |
| Georgia Tech | Tournament runner-up | 5th | 2023 | Semifinalist (0–5 vs BYU) |
| Virginia Tech | Highest RPI remaining teams | 12th | 2023 | Sweet 16 (1(3)–1(4) pen. vs Indiana) |
| North Carolina | National wildcard | 19th | 2023 | Sweet 16 (0–1 vs Cal Poly) |

=== Women's ===
| Team | Qualification | App | Last bid | Performance |
|---|---|---|---|---|
| Georgia | Tournament champion | 4th | 2017 | Semifinalist (0–2 vs UCLA) |
| Auburn | Tournament runner-up | 1st | Never | Sweet 16 (0–2 vs Kansas) |
| North Carolina | Highest RPI remaining teams | 19th | 2023 | Sweet 16 (1–2 vs Georgia) |
| Virginia | National wildcard | 14th | 2023 | Consolation quarterfinalist (0–2 vs Harvard) |
