= 2023 SCSA Regional Tournament =

Soccer tournament

- Association: NIRSA
- League: Southeast Collegiate Soccer Alliance
- Sport: Soccer
- Site: Dorey Park; Henrico, VA
- Duration: October 27–29, 2023
- Teams: 16 (men's); 12 (women's)

Men's Championship Division
- Score: 1–0
- Champion: Virginia Tech (4th title, 5th title game)
- Runners-up: North Carolina (6th title game)

Women's Championship Division
- Score: 1–0
- Champion: Virginia (3rd title, 3rd title game)
- Runners-up: South Carolina (1st title game)

Southeast Collegiate Soccer Alliance seasons
- ← 2022 2024 →

The 2023 Southeast Collegiate Soccer Alliance Regional Tournament was the 13th edition of the Southeast Collegiate Soccer Alliance's postseason club soccer tournament, which was held at Dorey Park in Henrico, Virginia from October 27–29th, 2023. A tournament was held for each the men's and women's divisions, with each tournament champion receiving an automatic bid to the 2023 NIRSA National Soccer Championships' championship division. The remaining 2 of NIRSA Region II's automatic bids for each division were given out based on RPI, with a special consideration to this tournament's performance.

== Format ==
The tournament consisted of twelve women's teams and sixteen men's teams. Each divisional champion received an automatic bid (6 for the women and 8 for the men) with the remaining wild card teams being the next highest RPI ranked teams that had not already qualified. Teams were divided into groups based on RPI.

For the men's division group stage, the 16 teams were split into four groups of four teams each. Each team played every other team in their group meaning a total of 6 games were played within a group. The top two teams from each group advanced to the round of 8.

For the women's division group stage, a team dropped out prior to the tournament and was unable to be replaced, meaning the tournament would only have 11 teams. The tournament would have two groups of four teams and one group of three teams. Each team played 2 games against teams in their group, and the top two teams from each group advanced to the quarterfinals. The final 2 spots were given to the highest ranked third placed teams. Seeding was adjusted based on teams' final game timings.

Pool play games were two 35-minute halves, separated by a seven-minute halftime and utilized the three points for a win system. After pool play, the two highest ranked teams from each group advanced to their respective gender division's knockout stage.

Tie-breaking criteria for group play
The ranking of teams in each group was based on the following criteria in order:
1. Highest number of points
2. Winner of head-to-head competition
3. Greatest goal difference
  - Maximum ± 5 goal difference per match
4. Most goals scored
5. Most shutouts
6. Coin flip (No penalty shootout for group stage standings)

Knockout stage games also consisted of two 35-minute halves. The quarterfinals were separated by a seven-minute halftime while the semifinals and finals had a ten-minute halftime. Knockout stage games needed to declare a winner. If a knockout-stage game was tied at the end of regulation, overtime would begin. Overtime consisted of one, 15-minute, golden-goal period. If still tied after overtime, kicks from the mark would determine the winner.

== Participants ==
=== Men's ===
Divisional champions
Division	Team	Appearance	Last bid
Atlantic North	Virginia Tech	9th	2022
Atlantic South	North Carolina	13th	2022
Coastal North	Florida	12th	2022
Coastal South	UCF	11th	2022
Mid-Atlantic	Elon	4th	2022
Mountain East	Georgia Tech	8th	2022
Mountain North	Tennessee	5th	2022
Mountain West	Alabama	4th	2019

Wild cards
Division	Team	Appearance	Last bid
Atlantic North	Virginia	12th	2022
Atlantic North	William & Mary	4th	2022
Atlantic South	NC State	7th	2021
Atlantic South	UNC-Wilmington	6th	2018
Coastal North	Florida State	5th	2019
Coastal South	USF	5th	2022
Mid-Atlantic	App State	4th	2021
Mountain North	Kentucky	3rd	2022

=== Women's ===
Divisional champions
Division	Team	Appearance	Last bid
Florida	Florida	13th	2022
North	Virginia	12th	2022
Northeast	North Carolina	13th	2022
Northwest	Vanderbilt	9th	2022
Southeast	Clemson	10th	2021
Southwest	Georgia	7th	2018

Wild cards
Division	Team	Appearance	Last bid
Florida	Tampa	1st	Never
Northeast	NC State	9th	2019
Northwest	Tennessee	3rd	2017
Southeast	South Carolina	2nd	2022
Southwest	Alabama	3rd	2022

== Group stage ==
Note: Scores obtained through SCSA's IMLeagues, however uncited because it's a primary source and generally unreliable.

=== Men's ===
Group A
Pos	Team	Pld	W	L	D	GF	GA	GD	Pts	Qualification
1	App State	3	2	1	0	3	2	+1	6	Advanced to knockout stage
2	Virginia Tech	3	1	0	2	5	3	+2	5	Advanced to knockout stage
3	USF	3	1	1	1	2	2	0	4	
4	Alabama	3	0	2	1	3	6	−3	1	

Scores

7:00pm EST	App State	0–2	Virginia Tech	Field 1
Fri, October 27				Stadium: Dorey Park; Henrico, VA

7:00pm EST	Alabama	0–2	USF	Field 2
Fri, October 27				Stadium: Dorey Park; Henrico, VA

8:30am EST	App State	1–0	Alabama	Field 2
Sat, October 28				Stadium: Dorey Park; Henrico, VA

8:30am EST	USF	0–0	Virginia Tech	Field 3
Sat, October 28				Stadium: Dorey Park; Henrico, VA

11:30am EST	Virginia Tech	3–3	Alabama	Field 5
Sat, October 28				Stadium: Dorey Park; Henrico, VA

11:30am EST	USF	0–2	App State	Field 4
Sat, October 28				Stadium: Dorey Park; Henrico, VA

Group B
Pos	Team	Pld	W	L	D	GF	GA	GD	Pts	Qualification
1	NC State	3	1	0	2	7	4	+3	5	Advanced to knockout stage
2	Elon	3	1	1	1	5	7	−2	4	Advanced to knockout stage
3	William & Mary	3	0	0	3	4	4	0	3	
4	Tennessee	3	0	1	2	4	5	−1	2	

Scores

7:00pm EST	NC State	1–1	William & Mary	Field 6
Fri, October 27				Stadium: Dorey Park; Henrico, VA

7:00pm EST	Elon	2–1	Tennessee	Field 5
Fri, October 27				Stadium: Dorey Park; Henrico, VA

8:30am EST	Elon	1–4	NC State	Field 5
Sat, October 28				Stadium: Dorey Park; Henrico, VA

8:30am EST	William & Mary	1–1	Tennessee	Field 6
Sat, October 28				Stadium: Dorey Park; Henrico, VA

11:30am EST	Elon	2–2	William & Mary	Field 1
Sat, October 28				Stadium: Dorey Park; Henrico, VA

11:30am EST	NC State	2–2	Tennessee	Field 2
Sat, October 28				Stadium: Dorey Park; Henrico, VA

Group C
Pos	Team	Pld	W	L	D	GF	GA	GD	Pts	Qualification
1	Georgia Tech	3	1	0	2	4	3	+1	5	Advanced to knockout stage
2	Florida	3	0	0	3	4	4	0	3	Advanced to knockout stage
3	Kentucky	3	0	0	3	3	3	0	3	
4	UNC-Wilmington	3	0	1	2	4	5	−1	2	

Scores

8:30pm EST	Florida	1–1	Georgia Tech	Field 3
Fri, October 27				Stadium: Dorey Park; Henrico, VA

8:30pm EST	UNC-Wilmington	1–1	Kentucky	Field 2
Fri, October 27				Stadium: Dorey Park; Henrico, VA

10:00am EST	UNC-Wilmington	2–2	Florida	Field 1
Sat, October 28				Stadium: Dorey Park; Henrico, VA

10:00am EST	Georgia Tech	1–1	Kentucky	Field 2
Sat, October 28				Stadium: Dorey Park; Henrico, VA

2:00pm EST	Georgia Tech	2–1	UNC-Wilmington	Field 3
Sat, October 28				Stadium: Dorey Park; Henrico, VA

2:00pm EST	Florida	1–1	Kentucky	Field 2
Sat, October 28				Stadium: Dorey Park; Henrico, VA

Group D
Pos	Team	Pld	W	L	D	GF	GA	GD	Pts	Qualification
1	North Carolina	3	2	0	1	4	2	+2	7	Advanced to knockout stage
2	Virginia	3	1	1	1	4	3	+1	4	Advanced to knockout stage
3	UCF	3	1	2	0	2	4	−2	3	
4	Florida State	3	0	1	2	1	2	−1	2	

Scores

8:30pm EST	Florida State	0–0	North Carolina	Field 6
Fri, October 27				Stadium: Dorey Park; Henrico, VA

8:30pm EST	UCF	0–2	Virginia	Field 5
Fri, October 27				Stadium: Dorey Park; Henrico, VA

10:00am EST	Florida State	0–1	UCF	Field 5
Sat, October 28				Stadium: Dorey Park; Henrico, VA

10:00am EST	North Carolina	2–1	Virginia	Field 6
Sat, October 28				Stadium: Dorey Park; Henrico, VA

2:00pm EST	North Carolina	2–1	UCF	Field 5
Sat, October 28				Stadium: Dorey Park; Henrico, VA

2:00pm EST	Virginia	1–1	Florida State	Field 6
Sat, October 28				Stadium: Dorey Park; Henrico, VA

=== Women's ===
Group A
Pos	Team	Pld	W	L	D	GF	GA	GD	Pts	Qualification
1	Florida	2	2	0	0	5	0	+5	6	Advanced to knockout stage
2	South Carolina	2	2	0	0	5	2	+3	6	Advanced to knockout stage
3	NC State	2	0	0	2	2	6	−4	0	Advanced to knockout stage
4	Tennessee	2	0	0	2	0	4	−4	0	

Scores

7:00pm EST	Florida	2–0	NC State	Field 3
Fri, October 27				Stadium: Dorey Park; Henrico, Virginia

8:30am EST	South Carolina	1–0	Tennessee	Field 1
Fri, October 27				Stadium: Dorey Park; Henrico, Virginia

11:30am EST	Florida	3–0	Tennessee	Field 3
Sat, October 28				Stadium: Dorey Park; Henrico, Virginia

2:00pm EST	South Carolina	4–2	NC State	Field 1
Sat, October 28				Stadium: Dorey Park; Henrico, Virginia

Group B
Pos	Team	Pld	W	L	D	GF	GA	GD	Pts	Qualification
1	Georgia	2	2	0	0	7	0	+7	6	Advanced to knockout stage
2	Vanderbilt	2	1	0	1	3	1	+2	4	Advanced to knockout stage
3	Tampa	2	0	1	1	1	5	−4	1	Advanced to knockout stage
4	Alabama	2	0	2	0	0	5	−5	0	

Scores

7:00pm EST	Vanderbilt	1–1	Tampa	Field 4
Fri, October 27				Stadium: Dorey Park; Henrico, Virginia

8:30pm EST	Georgia	3–0	Alabama	Field 1
Fri, October 27				Stadium: Dorey Park; Henrico, Virginia

10:00am EST	Georgia	4–0	Tampa	Field 3
Sat, October 28				Stadium: Dorey Park; Henrico, Virginia

10:00am EST	Vanderbilt	2–0	Alabama	Field 4
Sat, October 28				Stadium: Dorey Park; Henrico, Virginia

Group C
Pos	Team	Pld	W	L	D	GF	GA	GD	Pts	Qualification
1	Virginia	2	1	0	1	5	1	+4	4	Advanced to knockout stage
2	North Carolina	2	1	0	1	4	1	+3	4	Advanced to knockout stage
3	Clemson	2	0	2	0	0	7	−7	0	

Scores

8:30pm EST	Virginia	4–0	Clemson	Field 4
Fri, October 27				Stadium: Dorey Park; Henrico, Virginia

8:30am EST	North Carolina	3–0	Clemson	Field 4
Fri, October 27				Stadium: Dorey Park; Henrico, Virginia

11:30am EST	Virginia	1–1	North Carolina	Field 6
Sat, October 28				Stadium: Dorey Park; Henrico, Virginia

== Tournament bracket ==
=== Men's ===
Quarterfinals
Sat • 4:30pm • Field 6
App State	2
Elon	1
Sat • 4:30pm • Field 2
Virginia Tech	1
NC State	0
Sat • 6:00pm • Field 3
North Carolina	2
Florida	1
Sat • 6:00pm • Field 2
Georgia Tech	2
Virginia	0

Semifinals
Sun • 8:00am • Field 3
App State	0
Virginia Tech	1
Sun • 8:00am • Field 6
North Carolina	2
Georgia Tech	0

Final
Sun • 11:00am • Field 5
Virginia Tech	1
North Carolina	0

=== Women's ===
Quarterfinals
Sat • 4:30pm • Field 3
2	Florida	0
8	NC State	1
Sat • 4:30pm • Field 5
6	Vanderbilt	0
3	South Carolina	1
Sat • 6:00pm • Field 6
4	Virginia	6
7	Tampa	1
Sat • 6:00pm • Field 5
1	Georgia	0
5	North Carolina	3

Semifinals
Sun • 8:00am • Field 2
NC State	0
South Carolina	1
Sun • 8:00am • Field 5
Virginia	2
North Carolina	0

Final
Sun • 11:00am • Field 4
South Carolina	0
Virginia	1

== National Championship performance ==
=== Men's ===
Team	Qualification	App	Last bid	Performance
Virginia Tech	Tournament champion	11th	2018	Finalist (0–2 vs BYU)
North Carolina	Highest RPI remaining teams	18th	2022	Consolation Semifinalist (4–6 vs Texas)
Georgia Tech	2nd highest RPI remaining teams	4th	2016	Quarterfinalist (0–2 a.e.t. vs BYU)
Florida	National wildcard	15th	2022	Consolation Semifinalist (2–4 vs Illinois)

=== Women's ===
Team	Qualification	App	Last bid	Performance
Virginia	Tournament champion	13th	2022	Quarterfinalist (2–3 a.e.t. vs UCLA)
Florida	Highest RPI remaining teams	17th	2021	Quarterfinalist (0–1 a.e.t. vs Boston College)
South Carolina	2nd highest RPI remaining teams	1st	Never	Sweet 16 (0–2 vs Colorado State)
North Carolina	National wildcard	18th	2021	Sweet 16 (0–1 vs Michigan State)
Vanderbilt	National wildcard	2nd	2022	Semifinalist (0–1 vs Boston College)
