= 2023 NIRSA National Soccer Championship =

National collegiate club soccer tournament

- League: NIRSA
- Sport: Soccer
- Site: Round Rock Multipurpose Complex; Round Rock, Texas
- Duration: November 16–18, 2023
- Teams: 96 total (24 per division)
- Results: Official Results

Men's Championship Division
- Score: 2–0
- Champion: BYU (10th title, 11th title game)
- Runners-up: Virginia Tech (1st title game)
- Season MVP: Ben Gonzalez (BYU)

Women's Championship Division
- Score: 1–0
- Champion: UCLA (1st title, 1st title game)
- Runners-up: Boston College (2nd title game)
- Season MVP: Mia Kim (UCLA)

Men's Open Division
- Score: 3–1
- Champion: Miami (OH) (1st title, 2nd title game)
- Runners-up: Purdue (2nd title game)
- Season MVP: Noah Hjelmeng (Miami (OH))

Women's Open Division
- Score: 2–1 (a.e.t)
- Champion: San Diego State (2nd title, 2nd title game)
- Runners-up: UC-Santa Barbara (2nd title game)
- Top seed: Alex Guzzardo (San Diego State)

NIRSA national soccer championships seasons
- ← 2022 2024 →

The 2023 NIRSA national soccer championship was the 29th NIRSA National Soccer Championships, the annual national championships for United States-based, collegiate club soccer teams organized by NIRSA. It took place at the Round Rock Multipurpose Complex, in Round Rock, Texas from Thursday, November 16 to Saturday, November 18, 2023.

== Overview ==
=== Men's championship ===
In the finals, region II champions, Virginia Tech, were looking to end the tournament's winningest team, BYU's, streak of three straight titles. In the group stage, BYU won their opener 1–0 against the last team to beat them in the tournament, Florida, then secured first place in the group with a 2–0 win over Arizona State. Meanwhile, Virginia Tech won their opener against Colorado 2–0 but ended up finishing second in their group on the goals-for tiebreaker following a 1–1 tie against UCLA.

In the knockout round, Virginia Tech would require penalties against Missouri following a 0–0 draw in regulation and overtime. They would win 3–1 and face Rutgers in the quarterfinals which would finish 1–1 and again require overtime, but an overtime goal would send them to the semifinals against 2014 champion and 2019 runners up, Ohio State. Meanwhile, BYU would beat UConn 2–0 in the round of 16 and face Georgia Tech in the quarterfinals. Following a 0–0 draw in regulation, BYU would score 2 overtime goals to advance to the semifinals against UCLA. In the semifinals, Virginia Tech would once again require overtime after a 0–0 draw with Ohio State, but a late goal would send them to their first ever finals where they would face BYU who beat UCLA 2–0 and advanced to their 11th finals and fourth straight.

In the finals, the game would be tied 0–0 at halftime, but a goal from a freekick from Talmage Woodhouse and a second from Kyle Cuvelier would see BYU win their fourth straight national title and become the first team in the tournament with 10 titles. BYU, notably, would end the tournament with 0 goals conceded leading their goalkeeper, Chris Jenkinson, being named the tournament's best goalkeeper. BYU's Ben Gonzalez would be named tournament MVP.

=== Women's championship ===
In the finals, reigning open division champions, UCLA, would face 2019 championship runner's up Boston College. In the group stage, UCLA would win both their matches, first against Texas 3–0 then against Michigan 1–0, to win their group. Meanwhile, Boston College would win their opener against Purdue 2–0 but would tie their finale against Colorado 1–1 which would still be enough to win their group as well.

In the knockout round, UCLA would win their round of 16 matchup against Northeastern 2–0 then, following a 2–2 draw in regulation against region II champions, Virginia, UCLA would win 3–2 in overtime to advance to the semifinals against reigning champions Cal Poly. Meanwhile, Boston College would also win their round of 16 match 2–0 against Cornell then would also require overtime in the quarterfinals following a scoreless-draw against Florida that they would win 1–0 to face Vanderbilt in the semifinals. Boston College would win via a second half goal from eventual all-tournament member Camille Longabardi while UCLA would beat reigning champions, Cal Poly, 2–0 to reach their first championship finals. In the finals, a first half goal from UCLA would end up being the game winner as UCLA would win their first championship title. UCLA's Mia Kim would be named tournament MVP.

=== Men's open ===
In the finals, reigning open finalist and region III tournament co-runner's up Miami (OH) would face regional opponent and 2019 open division champions Purdue. Coming into the finals, both teams would win all 3 group stage games and their groups to advance to the knockout round. In the knockout round, Miami (OH) would beat Cal Poly 2–0 in the quarterfinals then Colorado College 1–0 in the semifinals while Purdue would beat Kansas 1–0 then, following a 0–0 draw against regional foe Cincinnati in regulation and extra time, Purdue would advance via a 4–3 victory in penalties. In the finals, the game would be tied 1–1 at halftime but Miami (OH) would score 2 second half goals and claim their first open title with a 3–1 victory. Noah Hjelmeng of Miami (OH) would go on to be named men's open division MVP.

=== Women's open ===
In the finals, 8-time women's championship winners and 2017 championship division winners, UC-Santa Barbara, would face 2018 open division champions San Diego State. In the group stage, UC-Santa Barbara would win their opener 4–1 over Quinnipiac but would tie their second match against Virginia Tech 1–1. However, a 4–0 win in their finale against Arkansas would see UC-Santa Barbara win their group and advance to the knockout round. Meanwhile, San Diego State would win all three games, first against Vermont 3–1 then against Colorado "Black" and Oakland by a score of 2–0. In the knockout round, San Diego State would beat Grand Valley State 3–1 then 2021 finalist UConn 2–0. Meanwhile, UC-Santa Barbara would beat UCF 2–0 in the quarterfinals then would beat Oregon 4–2 in penalties following a 1–1 draw in regulation and overtime. In the finals, both teams would score in the first half and the game would remain tied 1–1 at the end of regulation. In overtime, San Diego State would score the lone goal of the period and win their second open title with a 2–1 victory. Alex Guzzardo of San Diego State would go on to be named the division's MVP.

== Format ==
The competition consisted of 96 teams partitioned into 48 men's teams and 48 women's teams. Each of these partitions were further divided into two 24-team divisions, an invite-only championship division and an open division. These divisions were finally divided into groups, eight groups of three teams each in championship divisions and six groups of four teams each in the open divisions. All four divisions engaged in a round-robin tournament where they played each team in their group and utilized the three points for a win system to determine teams able to advance to a single elimination, knockout stage. In the championship division, the two highest ranked teams from each group advanced to their knockout stage, with the third placed team advancing to a consolation bracket. In the open division, the top team from each group as well as the two best second placed teams advanced to their knockout stage. The primary criteria for determining the best team was points followed by the following criteria.

Tie-breaking criteria for group play
The ranking of teams in each group was based on the following criteria in order:
1. Highest number of points
2. Winner of head-to-head competition
3. Greatest goal difference
  - Maximum ± 5 goal difference per match
4. Most goals scored
5. Most shutouts

In a tie breaking scenario involving more than 2 teams, the tiebreaker procedure would begin. If one team is identified as different and both remaining teams are still tied, the tie breaker procedure is restarted.

If a tie still remained after the first 5 criteria, the following was used to break a tie:

1. NCAA kicks from the mark
  - If there was a three-way tie, a coin-flip would be conducted. The two teams that chose the same outcome would compete in kicks from the mark between each other. The winner would compete with the last remaining team in kicks from the mark
  - If there's a four-way tie, a drawing of lots would be conducted (only could occur in open division)

Pool play games were two 40-minute halves, separated by a seven-minute halftime. Knockout stage games also consisted of two 40-minute halves. The round of 16 and quarterfinals were separated by a seven-minute halftime while the semifinals and finals had a ten minute halftime. Knockout stage games needed to declare a winner. If a knockout-stage game was tied at the end of regulation, overtime would begin. Overtime consisted of one, 15-minute, golden-goal period. If still tied after overtime, kicks from the mark would determine the winner.

=== Seeding ===
In the championship division, teams coming out of the same group were placed on opposite ends of the bracket and 1st placed teams against 2nd placed teams in the first round. In the first round, group A was matched against group D, group H matched against group E, group G matched against group F, and group B matched against group C. The winner of the A vs D matchup would face the winner of the H vs E matchup and the winner of the G vs F matchup would face the winner of the B vs C matchup in the quarterfinals.

In the championship division's consolation bracket, the third placed team from group A played the third placed team from group E, the third placed team from group F played the third placed team from group B, the third placed team from group C played the third placed team from group G, and the third placed team from group H played the third placed team from group D with the winner of the A vs E matchup facing the winner of the F vs B matchup and the winner of the C vs G matchup facing the winner of the H vs D matchup.

In the open division, the bracket was numbered top to bottom from 1–8. First, the highest ranked wildcard team was placed in position 4 with the other wildcard team being placed in position 8. Then, the pool winner from the group with the wildcard team in position 4 was placed in position 5 and the pool winner from the group with the wildcard team in position 8 was placed in position 1. Finally, using the tiebreaking procedures, the highest ranked remaining group winning team was placed in position 3, the second highest was placed in position 7, the third highest placed in position 2, and the final being placed in position 6.

== Qualification and selections ==
Each of the six regions received three automatic bids for both the men's and women's championship that they awarded to its members. The final six bids were considered "at-large", and were given out by NIRSA to teams, typically based on the regional tournament results and RPI.

The 48 remaining teams participated in the open division and were selected via a lottery draw that aired on October 6, 2023. Any team with membership in a NIRSA-affiliated league or with a minimum of four games played prior to the tournament was able to enter their name into the lottery. If a selected team qualified for the championship division, an alternate took their spot.

=== Men's championship ===
Automatic qualifiers
Region	Method	Team	Appearance	Last Bid
I	Tournament; Co-champ	Cornell	9th	2015
I	Tournament; Co-champ	Rutgers	2nd	2022
I	Highest RPI of remaining teams	UConn	7th	2022
II	Tournament; Champion	Virginia Tech	11th	2018
II	Highest RPI remaining teams	North Carolina	18th	2022
II	2nd highest RPI of remaining teams	Georgia Tech	4th	2016
III	Tournament; Co-champ	Michigan	18th	2021
III	Tournament; Co-champ	Indiana	7th	2011
III	Highest RPI of remaining teams	Wisconsin	8th	2022
IV	South Bid Game 1 Champion	Missouri	9th	2015
IV	South Bid Game 2 Champion	Texas Tech	12th	2022
IV	Bid Game 3 Winner	Texas	22nd	2022
V	Bid Game 1 Winner	Minnesota	18th	2022
V	Bid Game 2 Winner	Colorado State	24th	2022
V	Bid Game 3 Winner	Arizona State	3rd	2009
VI	North Tournament; Champion	BYU	13th	2022
VI	South Tournament; Champion	UCLA	6th	2015
VI	South Tournament; Runners-up	Disqualified	N/A	N/A

At-large bids
Region	Team	Appearance	Last Bid
I	Georgetown	2nd	2022
I	Northeastern	2nd	2013
II	Florida	15th	2022
III	Illinois	17th	2022
III	Ohio State	16th	2022
V	Colorado	21st	2022
VI	Oregon	8th	2021

=== Women's championship ===
Automatic qualifiers
Region	Method	Team	Appearance	Last Bid
I	Tournament; Co-champ	Boston College	7th	2022
I	Tournament; Co-champ	Northeastern	3rd	2018
I	Highest RPI of remaining teams	Cornell	11th	2019
II	Tournament; Champion	Virginia	13th	2022
II	Highest RPI remaining teams	Florida	17th	2021
II	2nd highest RPI of remaining teams	South Carolina	1st	Never
III	Tournament; Champion	Illinois	16th	2021
III	Highest RPI remaining teams	Michigan State	15th	2022
III	2nd highest RPI of remaining teams	Michigan	21st	2022
IV	Group A Winner	Texas	22nd	2022
IV	Group B Winner	TCU	2nd	2011
IV	2nd Place Bid Game; Winner	Kansas	11th	2021
V	Bid Game 1 Winner	Iowa State	2nd	2018
V	Bid Game 2 Winner	Colorado State	26th	2022
V	Bid Game 3 Winner	Colorado	28th	2022
VI	North Tournament; Champion	Boise State	1st	Never
VI	South Tournament; Co-Champion	Arizona State	2nd	2010
VI	South Tournament; Co-Champmion	Cal Poly	11th	2022

At-large bids
Region	Team	Appearance	Last Bid
II	North Carolina	18th	2021
II	Vanderbilt	2nd	2022
III	Ohio State	22nd	2022
III	Purdue	10th	2021
V	Minnesota	4th	2022
VI	UCLA	9th	2021

=== Men's lottery selection ===
Full men's lottery selections
Region	Team	Selection Type	Bid result
I	Babson	Automatic	Accepted
I	Rochester	Automatic	Accepted
I	Quinnipiac	Automatic	Accepted
I	UMass Amherst	Automatic	Accepted
I	Lehigh	Waitlist	Not given
I	Vermont	Waitlist	Not given
I	UConn	Waitlist	Championship
I	Brown	Waitlist	Not given
I	Boston University	Waitlist	Not given
I	Loyola (Maryland)	Waitlist	Not given
I	Penn State	Waitlist	Not given
I	Dartmouth	Waitlist	Not given
I	Northeastern	Waitlist	Championship
I	Bryant	Waitlist	Not given
I	Boston College	Waitlist	Not given
I	Stony Brook	Waitlist	Not given
I	Towson	Waitlist	Not given
I	Maryland	Waitlist	Not given
I	Cortland	Waitlist	Not given
I	Johns Hopkins	Waitlist	Not given
I	Fairfield	Waitlist	Not given
I	Springfield	Waitlist	Not given
I	Cornell	Waitlist	Championship
I	UPenn	Waitlist	Not given
I	Adelphi	Waitlist	Not given
I	New Haven	Waitlist	Not given
I	Providence	Waitlist	Not given
I	Hartford	Waitlist	Not given
I	Villanova	Waitlist	Not given
I	Carnegie Mellon	Waitlist	Not given
II	Virginia	Automatic	Accepted
II	Tampa	Automatic	Accepted
II	High Point	Automatic	Accepted
II	JMU	Automatic	Accepted
II	VCU	Waitlist	Not given
II	Georgia College	Waitlist	Not given
III	DePaul	Automatic	Not accepted
III	Illinois	Automatic	Championship
III	Xavier	Automatic	Accepted
III	Miami (OH)	Automatic	Accepted
III	Cincinnati	Waitlist	Accepted from waitlist
III	Purdue	Waitlist	Accepted from waitlist
IV	Texas A&M	Automatic	Not accepted
IV	TCU	Automatic	Accepted
IV	UTRGV	Automatic	Accepted
IV	Texas Tech	Automatic	Championship
IV	LSU	Waitlist	Accepted from waitlist
IV	Kansas	Waitlist	Accepted from waitlist
IV	Missouri	Waitlist	Championship
IV	Baylor	Waitlist	Not given
IV	Texas	Waitlist	Championship
V	Creighton	Automatic	Not accepted
V	Minnesota	Automatic	Accepted
V	Colorado	Automatic	Accepted
V	Iowa State	Automatic	Accepted
V	Arizona	Waitlist	Not accepted
V	Colorado College	Waitlist	Accepted from waitlist
VI	Cal Poly	Automatic	Accepted
VI	Cal State Fullerton	Automatic	Not accepted
VI	Weber State	Automatic	Accepted
VI	Loyola Marymount	Automatic	Not accepted
VI	Cal State San Marcos	Waitlist	Accepted from waitlist
VI	Oregon	Waitlist	Championship
VI	Boise State	Waitlist	Not accepted
VI	Utah Valley	Waitlist	Accepted from waitlist
VI	UC-Berkeley	Waitlist	Not given
VI	San Diego State	Waitlist	Not given
VI	UCLA	Waitlist	Championship

Participating teams
Region	Team	Selection Type	Bid result
I	Babson	Automatic	Accepted
I	Rochester	Automatic	Accepted
I	Quinnipiac	Automatic	Accepted
I	UMass Amherst	Automatic	Accepted
II	Virginia	Automatic	Accepted
II	Tampa	Automatic	Accepted
II	High Point	Automatic	Accepted
II	JMU	Automatic	Accepted
III	Xavier	Automatic	Accepted
III	Miami (OH)	Automatic	Accepted
III	Cincinnati	Waitlist	Accepted from waitlist
IV	Purdue	Waitlist	Accepted from waitlist
IV	TCU	Automatic	Accepted
IV	UTRGV	Automatic	Accepted
IV	LSU	Waitlist	Accepted from waitlist
V	Kansas	Waitlist	Accepted from waitlist
V	Minnesota	Automatic	Accepted
V	Colorado	Automatic	Accepted
V	Iowa State	Automatic	Accepted
V	Colorado College	Waitlist	Accepted from waitlist
VI	Cal Poly	Automatic	Accepted
VI	Weber State	Automatic	Accepted
VI	Cal State San Marcos	Waitlist	Accepted from waitlist
VI	Utah Valley	Waitlist	Accepted from waitlist

=== Women's lottery selection ===
Full women's lottery selections
Region	Team	Selection Type	Bid result
I	Yale	Automatic	Not accepted
I	Vermont	Automatic	Accepted
I	UConn	Automatic	Accepted
I	Bucknell	Automatic	Not accepted
I	Maryland	Waitlist	Accepted from waitlist
I	Millersville	Waitlist	Accepted from waitlist
I	Quinnipiac	Waitlist	Accepted from waitlist
I	Penn State	Waitlist	Not given
I	Georgetown	Waitlist	Not given
I	Elizabethtown	Waitlist	Not given
I	Syracuse	Waitlist	Not given
I	Delaware	Waitlist	Not given
I	Buffalo	Waitlist	Not given
I	RIT	Waitlist	Not given
I	Villanova	Waitlist	Not given
I	Northeastern	Waitlist	Championship
I	Cornell	Waitlist	Championship
I	Boston College	Waitlist	Championship
I	UMass	Waitlist	Not given
I	Johns Hopkins	Waitlist	Not given
I	Springfield	Waitlist	Not given
I	UPenn	Waitlist	Not given
I	College of New Jersey	Waitlist	Not given
II	JMU	Automatic	Accepted
II	UCF	Automatic	Accepted
II	Alabama	Automatic	Accepted
II	William & Mary	Automatic	Not accepted
II	Virginia Tech	Waitlist	Accepted from waitlist
II	Clemson	Waitlist	Not given
II	Florida State	Waitlist	Not given
II	Wake Forest	Waitlist	Not given
II	East Carolina	Waitlist	Not given
II	Vanderbilt	Waitlist	Championship
II	Florida Gulf Coast	Waitlist	Not given
II	Georgia Southern	Waitlist	Not given
II	Tampa	Waitlist	Not given
III	Miami (OH)	Automatic	Accepted
III	Grand Valley State	Automatic	Accepted
III	Oakland	Automatic	Accepted
III	Western Michigan	Automatic	Accepted
III	Purdue	Waitlist	Championship
III	UW La Crosse	Waitlist	Not given
III	Butler	Waitlist	Not given
III	Cincinnati	Waitlist	Not given
III	Ohio	Waitlist	Not given
III	Notre Dame	Waitlist	Not given
III	Dayton	Waitlist	Not given
III	Illinois	Waitlist	Championship
IV	Texas A&M	Automatic	Accepted
IV	Kansas	Automatic	Championship
IV	Missouri	Automatic	Accepted
IV	Arkansas	Automatic	Accepted
IV	LSU	Waitlist	Accepted from waitlist
IV	Baylor	Waitlist	Not given
V	Colorado	Automatic	Accepted
V	Northern Colorado	Automatic	Not accepted
V	Minnesota	Automatic	Championship
V	Iowa State	Automatic	Championship
V	Colorado Mines	Waitlist	Accepted from waitlist
V	Colorado College	Waitlist	Accepted from waitlist
V	St. Thomas (MN)	Waitlist	Not accepted
V	Colorado State	Waitlist	Championship
VI	San Diego State	Automatic	Accepted
VI	Oregon	Automatic	Accepted
VI	UCLA	Automatic	Championship
VI	UC-Santa Barbara	Automatic	Accepted
VI	Boise State	Waitlist	Not accepted
VI	UC-Davis	Waitlist	Accepted from waitlist

Participating teams
Region	Team	Selection Type	Bid result
I	Vermont	Automatic	Accepted
I	UConn	Automatic	Accepted
I	Maryland	Waitlist	Accepted from waitlist
I	Millersville	Waitlist	Accepted from waitlist
I	Quinnipiac	Waitlist	Accepted from waitlist
II	JMU	Automatic	Accepted
II	UCF	Automatic	Accepted
II	Alabama	Automatic	Accepted
II	Virginia Tech	Waitlist	Accepted from waitlist
III	Miami (OH)	Automatic	Accepted
III	Grand Valley State	Automatic	Accepted
III	Oakland	Automatic	Accepted
III	Western Michigan	Automatic	Accepted
IV	Texas A&M	Automatic	Accepted
IV	Missouri	Automatic	Accepted
IV	Arkansas	Automatic	Accepted
IV	LSU	Waitlist	Accepted from waitlist
V	Colorado	Automatic	Accepted
V	Colorado Mines	Waitlist	Accepted from waitlist
V	Colorado College	Waitlist	Accepted from waitlist
VI	San Diego State	Automatic	Accepted
VI	Oregon	Automatic	Accepted
VI	UC-Santa Barbara	Automatic	Accepted
VI	UC-Davis	Waitlist	Accepted from waitlist

== Group stage ==
Results from pool play from all 4 divisions:

Tie-breaking criteria for group play
The ranking of teams in each group was based on the following criteria in order:
1. Highest number of points
2. Winner of head-to-head competition
3. Greatest goal difference
  - Maximum ± 5 goal difference per match
4. Most goals scored
5. Most shutouts

In a tie breaking scenario involving more than 2 teams, the tiebreaker procedure would begin as normal. If one team is identified as different and both remaining teams are still tied, the tie breaker procedure is restarted.

If a tie still remained after the first 5 criteria, the following was used to break a tie:

1. NCAA kicks from the mark
  - If there was a three-way tie, a coin-flip would be conducted. The two teams that chose the same outcome would compete in kicks from the mark between each other. The winner would compete with the last remaining team in kicks from the mark
  - If there's a four-way tie, a drawing of lots would be conducted (only could occur in open division)

=== Men's championship ===
Group A
Pos	Team	Pld	W	D	L	GF	GA	GD	Pts	Qualification
1	BYU	2	2	0	0	3	0	+3	6	Advanced to knockout stage
2	Arizona State	2	1	0	1	3	3	0	3	Advanced to knockout stage
3	Florida	2	0	0	2	1	4	−3	0	Consolation

Scores

8:00am CST	BYU	1–0	Florida	Field 7
Thu, November 16		Report		Stadium: Round Rock Multipurpose Complex; Round Rock, Texas

1:15pm CST	Florida	1–3	Arizona State	Field 9
Thu, November 16		Report		Stadium: Round Rock Multipurpose Complex; Round Rock, Texas

6:30pm CST	Arizona State	0–2	BYU	Field 8
Thu, November 16		Report		Stadium: Round Rock Multipurpose Complex; Round Rock, Texas

Group B
Pos	Team	Pld	W	D	L	GF	GA	GD	Pts	Qualification
1	Michigan	2	2	0	0	5	2	+3	6	Advanced to knockout stage
2	Rutgers	2	0	1	1	2	3	−1	1	Advanced to knockout stage
3	Texas Tech	2	0	1	1	2	4	−2	1	Consolation

Scores

8:00am CST	Michigan	3–1	Texas Tech	Field 8
Thu, November 16		Report		Stadium: Round Rock Multipurpose Complex; Round Rock, Texas

1:15pm CST	Texas Tech	1–1	Rutgers	Field 10
Thu, November 16		Report		Stadium: Round Rock Multipurpose Complex; Round Rock, Texas

6:30pm CST	Rutgers	1–2	Michigan	Field 7
Thu, November 16		Report		Stadium: Round Rock Multipurpose Complex; Round Rock, Texas

Group C
Pos	Team	Pld	W	D	L	GF	GA	GD	Pts	Qualification
1	Minnesota	2	1	1	0	4	2	+2	4	Advanced to knockout stage
2	Georgetown	2	1	1	0	4	3	+1	4	Advanced to knockout stage
3	Texas	2	0	0	2	3	6	−3	0	Consolation

Scores

8:00am CST	Minnesota	1–1	Georgetown	Field 9
Thu, November 16		Report		Stadium: Round Rock Multipurpose Complex; Round Rock, Texas

1:15pm CST	Georgetown	3–2	Texas	Field 7
Thu, November 16		Report		Stadium: Round Rock Multipurpose Complex; Round Rock, Texas

6:30pm CST	Texas	1–3	Minnesota	Field 10
Thu, November 16		Report		Stadium: Round Rock Multipurpose Complex; Round Rock, Texas

Group D
Pos	Team	Pld	W	D	L	GF	GA	GD	Pts	Qualification
1	Ohio State	2	2	0	0	4	0	+4	6	Advanced to knockout stage
2	UConn	2	1	0	1	2	3	−1	3	Advanced to knockout stage
3	North Carolina	2	0	0	2	1	4	−3	0	Consolation

Scores

8:00am CST	North Carolina	0–2	Ohio State	Field 10
Thu, November 16		Report		Stadium: Round Rock Multipurpose Complex; Round Rock, Texas

1:15pm CST	Ohio State	2–0	UConn	Field 8
Thu, November 16		Report		Stadium: Round Rock Multipurpose Complex; Round Rock, Texas

6:30pm CST	UConn	2–1	North Carolina	Field 9
Thu, November 16		Report		Stadium: Round Rock Multipurpose Complex; Round Rock, Texas

Group E
Pos	Team	Pld	W	D	L	GF	GA	GD	Pts	Qualification
1	Cornell	2	1	0	1	5	4	+1	3	Advanced to knockout stage
2	Georgia Tech	2	1	0	1	4	4	0	3	Advanced to knockout stage
3	Wisconsin	2	1	0	1	3	4	−1	3	Consolation

Scores

9:45am CST	Cornell	2–3	Georgia Tech	Field 7
Thu, November 16		Report		Stadium: Round Rock Multipurpose Complex; Round Rock, Texas

3:00pm CST	Georgia Tech	1–2	Wisconsin	Field 9
Thu, November 16		Report		Stadium: Round Rock Multipurpose Complex; Round Rock, Texas

8:15pm CST	Wisconsin	1–3	Cornell	Field 8
Thu, November 16		Report		Stadium: Round Rock Multipurpose Complex; Round Rock, Texas

Group F
Pos	Team	Pld	W	D	L	GF	GA	GD	Pts	Qualification
1	Missouri	2	1	1	0	3	1	+2	4	Advanced to knockout stage
2	Oregon	2	1	0	1	1	2	−1	3	Advanced to knockout stage
3	Illinois	2	0	1	1	1	2	−1	1	Consolation

Scores

9:45am CST	Missouri	1–1	Illinois	Field 8
Thu, November 16		Report		Stadium: Round Rock Multipurpose Complex; Round Rock, Texas

3:00pm CST	Illinois	0–1	Oregon	Field 10
Thu, November 16		Report		Stadium: Round Rock Multipurpose Complex; Round Rock, Texas

8:15pm CST	Oregon	0–2	Missouri	Field 7
Thu, November 16		Report		Stadium: Round Rock Multipurpose Complex; Round Rock, Texas

Group G
Pos	Team	Pld	W	D	L	GF	GA	GD	Pts	Qualification
1	UCLA	2	1	1	0	5	3	+2	4	Advanced to knockout stage
2	Virginia Tech	2	1	1	0	3	1	+2	4	Advanced to knockout stage
3	Colorado	2	0	0	2	2	6	−4	0	Consolation

Scores

9:45am CST	Virginia Tech	2–0	Colorado	Field 9
Thu, November 16		Report		Stadium: Round Rock Multipurpose Complex; Round Rock, Texas

3:00pm CST	Colorado	2–4	UCLA	Field 7
Thu, November 16		Report		Stadium: Round Rock Multipurpose Complex; Round Rock, Texas

8:15pm CST	UCLA	1–1	Virginia Tech	Field 10
Thu, November 16		Report		Stadium: Round Rock Multipurpose Complex; Round Rock, Texas

Group H
Pos	Team	Pld	W	D	L	GF	GA	GD	Pts	Qualification
1	Indiana	2	0	2	0	3	3	0	2	Advanced to knockout stage
2	Colorado State	2	0	2	0	2	2	0	2	Advanced to knockout stage
3	Northeastern	2	0	2	0	1	1	0	2	Consolation

Scores

9:45am CST	Indiana	1–1	Northeastern	Field 10
Thu, November 16		Report		Stadium: Round Rock Multipurpose Complex; Round Rock, Texas

3:00pm CST	Northeastern	0–0	Colorado State	Field 8
Thu, November 16		Report		Stadium: Round Rock Multipurpose Complex; Round Rock, Texas

8:15pm CST	Colorado State	2–2	Indiana	Field 9
Thu, November 16		Report		Stadium: Round Rock Multipurpose Complex; Round Rock, Texas

=== Women's championship ===
Group A
Pos	Team	Pld	W	D	L	GF	GA	GD	Pts	Qualification
1	Michigan State	2	1	1	0	5	1	+4	4	Advanced to knockout stage
2	Virginia	2	1	1	0	5	1	+4	4	Advanced to knockout stage
3	Iowa State	2	0	0	2	0	8	−8	0	Consolation

Scores

8:00am CST	Virginia	4–0	Iowa State	Field 3
Thu, November 16		Report		Stadium: Round Rock Multipurpose Complex; Round Rock, Texas

1:15pm CST	Iowa State	0–4	Michigan State	Field 5
Thu, November 16		Report		Stadium: Round Rock Multipurpose Complex; Round Rock, Texas

6:30pm CST	Michigan State	1–1	Virginia	Field 4
Thu, November 16		Report		Stadium: Round Rock Multipurpose Complex; Round Rock, Texas

9:30am CST	Virginia	1st/2nd Seeding (3–4 p)	Michigan State	Field 10
Fri, November 17		Report		Stadium: Round Rock Multipurpose Complex; Round Rock, Texas
	Penalties
	Penalty scored Penalty missed		Penalty scored Penalty missed

Group B
Pos	Team	Pld	W	D	L	GF	GA	GD	Pts	Qualification
1	Boston College	2	1	1	0	3	1	+2	4	Advanced to knockout stage
2	Colorado	2	0	2	0	2	2	0	2	Advanced to knockout stage
3	Purdue	2	0	1	1	1	3	−2	1	Consolation

Scores

8:00am CST	Boston College	2–0	Purdue	Field 4
Thu, November 16		Report		Stadium: Round Rock Multipurpose Complex; Round Rock, Texas

1:15pm CST	Purdue	1–1	Colorado	Field 6
Thu, November 16		Report		Stadium: Round Rock Multipurpose Complex; Round Rock, Texas

6:30pm CST	Colorado	1–1	Boston College	Field 3
Thu, November 16		Report		Stadium: Round Rock Multipurpose Complex; Round Rock, Texas

Group C
Pos	Team	Pld	W	D	L	GF	GA	GD	Pts	Qualification
1	Cal Poly	2	0	2	0	3	3	0	2	Advanced to knockout stage
2	Cornell	2	0	2	0	2	2	0	2	Advanced to knockout stage
3	Kansas	2	0	2	0	1	1	0	2	Consolation

Scores

8:00am CST	Cal Poly	2–2	Cornell	Field 5
Thu, November 16		Report		Stadium: Round Rock Multipurpose Complex; Round Rock, Texas

1:15pm CST	Cornell	0–0	Kansas	Field 3
Thu, November 16		Report		Stadium: Round Rock Multipurpose Complex; Round Rock, Texas

6:30pm CST	Kansas	1–1	Cal Poly	Field 6
Thu, November 16		Report		Stadium: Round Rock Multipurpose Complex; Round Rock, Texas

Group D
Pos	Team	Pld	W	D	L	GF	GA	GD	Pts	Qualification
1	Minnesota	2	2	0	0	3	1	+2	6	Advanced to knockout stage
2	North Carolina	2	1	0	1	3	2	+1	3	Advanced to knockout stage
3	Illinois	2	0	0	2	2	5	−3	0	Consolation

Scores

8:00am CST	Illinois	1–2	Minnesota	Field 6
Thu, November 16		Report		Stadium: Round Rock Multipurpose Complex; Round Rock, Texas

1:15pm CST	Minnesota	1–0	North Carolina	Field 4
Thu, November 16		Report		Stadium: Round Rock Multipurpose Complex; Round Rock, Texas

6:30pm CST	North Carolina	3–1	Illinois	Field 5
Thu, November 16		Report		Stadium: Round Rock Multipurpose Complex; Round Rock, Texas

Group E
Pos	Team	Pld	W	D	L	GF	GA	GD	Pts	Qualification
1	UCLA	2	2	0	0	4	0	+4	6	Advanced to knockout stage
2	Michigan	2	1	0	1	2	1	+1	3	Advanced to knockout stage
3	Texas	2	0	0	2	0	5	−5	0	Consolation

Scores

9:45am CST	Texas	0–3	UCLA	Field 3
Thu, November 16		Report		Stadium: Round Rock Multipurpose Complex; Round Rock, Texas

3:00pm CST	UCLA	1–0	Michigan	Field 5
Thu, November 16		Report		Stadium: Round Rock Multipurpose Complex; Round Rock, Texas

8:15pm CST	Michigan	2–0	Texas	Field 4
Thu, November 16		Report		Stadium: Round Rock Multipurpose Complex; Round Rock, Texas

Group F
Pos	Team	Pld	W	D	L	GF	GA	GD	Pts	Qualification
1	South Carolina	2	2	0	0	3	1	+2	6	Advanced to knockout stage
2	Ohio State	2	1	0	1	2	2	0	3	Advanced to knockout stage
3	Arizona State	2	0	0	2	2	4	−2	0	Consolation

Scores

9:45am CST	Arizona State	1–2	Ohio State	Field 4
Thu, November 16		Report		Stadium: Round Rock Multipurpose Complex; Round Rock, Texas

3:00pm CST	Ohio State	0–1	South Carolina	Field 6
Thu, November 16		Report		Stadium: Round Rock Multipurpose Complex; Round Rock, Texas

8:15pm CST	South Carolina	2–1	Arizona State	Field 3
Thu, November 16		Report		Stadium: Round Rock Multipurpose Complex; Round Rock, Texas

Group G
Pos	Team	Pld	W	D	L	GF	GA	GD	Pts	Qualification
1	Florida	2	2	0	0	2	0	+2	6	Advanced to knockout stage
2	Colorado State	2	1	0	1	4	2	+2	3	Advanced to knockout stage
3	TCU	2	0	0	2	1	5	−4	0	Consolation

Scores

9:45am CST	Colorado State	0–1	Florida	Field 5
Thu, November 16		Report		Stadium: Round Rock Multipurpose Complex; Round Rock, Texas

3:00pm CST	Florida	1–0	TCU	Field 3
Thu, November 16		Report		Stadium: Round Rock Multipurpose Complex; Round Rock, Texas

8:15pm CST	TCU	1–4	Colorado State	Field 6
Thu, November 16		Report		Stadium: Round Rock Multipurpose Complex; Round Rock, Texas

Group H
Pos	Team	Pld	W	D	L	GF	GA	GD	Pts	Qualification
1	Vanderbilt	2	2	0	0	7	1	+6	6	Advanced to knockout stage
2	Northeastern	2	1	0	1	2	3	−1	3	Advanced to knockout stage
3	Boise State	2	0	0	2	1	6	−5	0	Consolation

Scores

9:45am CST	Northeastern	2–0	Boise State	Field 6
Thu, November 16		Report		Stadium: Round Rock Multipurpose Complex; Round Rock, Texas

3:00pm CST	Boise State	1–4	Vanderbilt	Field 4
Thu, November 16		Report		Stadium: Round Rock Multipurpose Complex; Round Rock, Texas

8:15pm CST	Vanderbilt	3–0	Northeastern	Field 5
Thu, November 16		Report		Stadium: Round Rock Multipurpose Complex; Round Rock, Texas

=== Men's open ===
Group A
Pos	Team	Pld	W	D	L	GF	GA	GD	Pts	Qualification
1	Colorado College	3	3	0	0	8	3	+5	9	Advanced to knockout stage
2	Kansas	3	2	0	1	8	3	+5	6	Advanced to knockout stage
3	Virginia	3	1	0	2	8	6	+2	3	
4	Rochester	3	0	0	3	2	14	−12	0	

Scores

11:30am CST	Kansas	6–1	Rochester	Field OSP1
Thu, November 16		Report		Stadium: Round Rock Multipurpose Complex; Round Rock, Texas

11:30am CST	Virginia	2–4	Colorado College	Field OSP2
Thu, November 16		Report		Stadium: Round Rock Multipurpose Complex; Round Rock, Texas

6:30pm CST	Colorado College	1–0	Kansas	Field OSP3
Thu, November 16		Report		Stadium: Round Rock Multipurpose Complex; Round Rock, Texas

6:30pm CST	Rochester	0–5	Virginia	Field OSP4
Thu, November 16		Report		Stadium: Round Rock Multipurpose Complex; Round Rock, Texas

10:00am CST	Kansas	2–1	Virginia	Field OSP5
Fri, November 17		Report		Stadium: Round Rock Multipurpose Complex; Round Rock, Texas

10:00am CST	Colorado College	3–1	Rochester	Field 2
Fri, November 17		Report		Stadium: Round Rock Multipurpose Complex; Round Rock, Texas

Group B
Pos	Team	Pld	W	D	L	GF	GA	GD	Pts	Qualification
1	Tampa	3	2	0	1	5	4	+1	6	Advanced to knockout stage
2	TCU	3	2	0	1	5	5	0	6	
3	Colorado "Black"	3	1	1	1	4	3	+1	4	
4	Quinnipiac	3	0	1	2	1	3	−2	1	

Scores

11:30am CST	Colorado "Black"	1–1	Quinnipiac	Field OSP3
Thu, November 16		Report		Stadium: Round Rock Multipurpose Complex; Round Rock, Texas

11:30am CST	Tampa	4–2	TCU	Field OSP4
Thu, November 16		Report		Stadium: Round Rock Multipurpose Complex; Round Rock, Texas

6:30pm CST	TCU	2–1	Colorado "Black"	Field OSP5
Thu, November 16		Report		Stadium: Round Rock Multipurpose Complex; Round Rock, Texas

6:30pm CST	Quinnipiac	0–1	Tampa	Field 2
Thu, November 16		Report		Stadium: Round Rock Multipurpose Complex; Round Rock, Texas

10:00am CST	Colorado "Black"	2–0	Tampa	Field OSP1
Fri, November 17		Report		Stadium: Round Rock Multipurpose Complex; Round Rock, Texas

10:00am CST	TCU	1–0	Quinnipiac	Field OSP2
Fri, November 17		Report		Stadium: Round Rock Multipurpose Complex; Round Rock, Texas

Group C
Pos	Team	Pld	W	D	L	GF	GA	GD	Pts	Qualification
1	Miami (OH)	3	3	0	0	6	1	+5	9	Advanced to knockout stage
2	JMU	3	2	0	1	5	3	+2	6	
3	Minnesota "Maroon"	3	1	0	2	2	3	−1	3	
4	Utah Valley	3	0	0	3	1	7	−6	0	

Scores

11:30am CST	Minnesota "Maroon"	1–0	Utah Valley	Field OSP5
Thu, November 16		Report		Stadium: Round Rock Multipurpose Complex; Round Rock, Texas

11:30am CST	Miami (OH)	2–0	JMU	Field 2
Thu, November 16		Report		Stadium: Round Rock Multipurpose Complex; Round Rock, Texas

6:30pm CST	JMU	1–0	Minnesota "Maroon"	Field OSP1
Thu, November 16		Report		Stadium: Round Rock Multipurpose Complex; Round Rock, Texas

6:30pm CST	Utah Valley	0–2	Miami (OH)	Field OSP2
Thu, November 16		Report		Stadium: Round Rock Multipurpose Complex; Round Rock, Texas

10:00am CST	Minnesota "Maroon"	1–2	Miami (OH)	Field OSP3
Fri, November 17		Report		Stadium: Round Rock Multipurpose Complex; Round Rock, Texas

10:00am CST	JMU	4–1	Utah Valley	Field OSP4
Fri, November 17		Report		Stadium: Round Rock Multipurpose Complex; Round Rock, Texas

Group D
Pos	Team	Pld	W	D	L	GF	GA	GD	Pts	Qualification
1	Weber State	3	2	1	0	9	2	+7	7	Advanced to knockout stage
2	Babson College	3	1	1	1	3	6	−3	4	
3	Iowa State	3	0	3	0	2	2	0	3	
4	Xavier	3	0	1	2	0	4	−4	1	

Scores

1:15pm CST	Weber State	3–0	Xavier	Field OSP1
Thu, November 16		Report		Stadium: Round Rock Multipurpose Complex; Round Rock, Texas

1:15pm CST	Iowa State	1–1	Babson College	Field OSP2
Thu, November 16		Report		Stadium: Round Rock Multipurpose Complex; Round Rock, Texas

8:15pm CST	Babson College	1–5	Weber State	Field OSP3
Thu, November 16		Report		Stadium: Round Rock Multipurpose Complex; Round Rock, Texas

8:15pm CST	Xavier	0–0	Iowa State	Field OSP4
Thu, November 16		Report		Stadium: Round Rock Multipurpose Complex; Round Rock, Texas

1:00pm CST	Weber State	1–1	Iowa State	Field OSP5
Fri, November 17		Report		Stadium: Round Rock Multipurpose Complex; Round Rock, Texas

1:00pm CST	Babson College	1–0	Xavier	Field 2
Fri, November 17		Report		Stadium: Round Rock Multipurpose Complex; Round Rock, Texas

Group E
Pos	Team	Pld	W	D	L	GF	GA	GD	Pts	Qualification
1	Purdue	3	3	0	0	7	2	+5	9	Advanced to knockout stage
2	LSU	3	2	0	1	6	4	+2	6	
3	Cal State San Marcos	3	1	0	2	3	5	−2	3	
4	High Point	3	0	0	3	1	6	−5	0	

Scores

1:15pm CST	Purdue	3–1	High Point	Field OSP3
Thu, November 16		Report		Stadium: Round Rock Multipurpose Complex; Round Rock, Texas

1:15pm CST	Cal State San Marcos	2–3	LSU	Field OSP4
Thu, November 16		Report		Stadium: Round Rock Multipurpose Complex; Round Rock, Texas

8:15pm CST	LSU	1–2	Purdue	Field OSP5
Thu, November 16		Report		Stadium: Round Rock Multipurpose Complex; Round Rock, Texas

8:15pm CST	High Point	0–1	Cal State San Marcos	Field 2
Thu, November 16		Report		Stadium: Round Rock Multipurpose Complex; Round Rock, Texas

1:00pm CST	Purdue	2–0	Cal State San Marcos	Field OSP1
Fri, November 17		Report		Stadium: Round Rock Multipurpose Complex; Round Rock, Texas

1:00pm CST	LSU	2–0	High Point	Field OSP2
Fri, November 17		Report		Stadium: Round Rock Multipurpose Complex; Round Rock, Texas

Group F
Pos	Team	Pld	W	D	L	GF	GA	GD	Pts	Qualification
1	Cincinnati	3	3	0	0	7	0	+7	9	Advanced to knockout stage
2	Cal Poly	3	2	0	1	5	1	+4	6	Advanced to knockout stage
3	UMass Amherst	3	0	1	2	0	5	−5	1	
4	UTRGV	3	0	1	2	0	6	−6	1	

Scores

1:15pm CST	Cincinnati	3–0	UTRGV	Field OSP5
Thu, November 16		Report		Stadium: Round Rock Multipurpose Complex; Round Rock, Texas

1:15pm CST	Cal Poly	2–0	UMass Amherst	Field 2
Thu, November 16		Report		Stadium: Round Rock Multipurpose Complex; Round Rock, Texas

8:15pm CST	UMass Amherst	0–3	Cincinnati	Field OSP1
Thu, November 16		Report		Stadium: Round Rock Multipurpose Complex; Round Rock, Texas

8:15pm CST	UTRGV	0–3	Cal Poly	Field OSP2
Thu, November 16		Report		Stadium: Round Rock Multipurpose Complex; Round Rock, Texas

1:00pm CST	Cincinnati	1–0	Cal Poly	Field OSP3
Fri, November 17		Report		Stadium: Round Rock Multipurpose Complex; Round Rock, Texas

1:00pm CST	UMass Amherst	0–0	UTRGV	Field OSP4
Fri, November 17		Report		Stadium: Round Rock Multipurpose Complex; Round Rock, Texas

=== Women's open ===
Group A
Pos	Team	Pld	W	D	L	GF	GA	GD	Pts	Qualification
1	UConn	3	2	0	1	12	3	+6 (Note: Actual GD differs because the max GD for any one game is ±5, which applied when UConn beat Western Michigan 8–0)	6	Advanced to knockout stage
2	UCF	3	2	0	1	9	4	+4 (Note: Actual GD differs because the max GD for any one game is ±5, which applied when UCF beat Western Michigan 6–0)	6	Advanced to knockout stage
3	Missouri	3	2	0	1	8	4	+4	6	
4	Western Michigan	3	0	0	3	0	18	−14	0	

Notes:

Scores

8:00am CST	UConn	8–0	Western Michigan	Field OSP1
Thu, November 16		Report		Stadium: Round Rock Multipurpose Complex; Round Rock, Texas

8:00am CST	Missouri	3–1	UCF	Field OSP2
Thu, November 16		Report		Stadium: Round Rock Multipurpose Complex; Round Rock, Texas

3:00pm CST	UCF	2–1	UConn	Field OSP3
Thu, November 16		Report		Stadium: Round Rock Multipurpose Complex; Round Rock, Texas

3:00pm CST	Western Michigan	0–4	Missouri	Field OSP4
Thu, November 16		Report		Stadium: Round Rock Multipurpose Complex; Round Rock, Texas

8:00am CST	UConn	3–1	Missouri	Field OSP2
Fri, November 17		Report		Stadium: Round Rock Multipurpose Complex; Round Rock, Texas

8:00am CST	UCF	6–0	Western Michigan	Field OSP3
Fri, November 17		Report		Stadium: Round Rock Multipurpose Complex; Round Rock, Texas

Group B
Pos	Team	Pld	W	D	L	GF	GA	GD	Pts	Qualification
1	LSU	3	2	0	1	6	4	+2	6	Advanced to knockout stage
2	Maryland	3	2	0	1	5	3	+2	6	
3	Penn State	3	2	0	1	5	3	+2	6	
4	JMU	3	0	0	3	1	7	−6	0	

Scores

8:00am CST	JMU	0–1	Penn State	Field OSP3
Thu, November 16		Report		Stadium: Round Rock Multipurpose Complex; Round Rock, Texas

8:00am CST	Maryland	2–0	LSU	Field OSP4
Thu, November 16		Report		Stadium: Round Rock Multipurpose Complex; Round Rock, Texas

3:00pm CST	LSU	4–1	JMU	Field OSP5
Thu, November 16		Report		Stadium: Round Rock Multipurpose Complex; Round Rock, Texas

3:00pm CST	Penn State	3–1	Maryland	Field 2
Thu, November 16		Report		Stadium: Round Rock Multipurpose Complex; Round Rock, Texas

8:00am CST	JMU	0–2	Maryland	Field 2
Fri, November 17		Report		Stadium: Round Rock Multipurpose Complex; Round Rock, Texas

8:00am CST	LSU	2–1	Penn State	Field 3
Fri, November 17		Report		Stadium: Round Rock Multipurpose Complex; Round Rock, Texas

Group C
Pos	Team	Pld	W	D	L	GF	GA	GD	Pts	Qualification
1	Oregon	3	3	0	0	10	0	+8 (Note: Actual GD differs because the max GD for any one game is ±5, which applied when Oregon beat Millersville)	9	Advanced to knockout stage
2	Grand Valley State	3	2	0	1	7	2	+5	6	Advanced to knockout stage
3	Colorado Mines	3	0	1	2	1	4	−3	1	
4	Millersville	3	0	1	2	2	14	−10	1	

Notes:

Scores

8:00am CST	Oregon	7–0	Millersville	Field OSP5
Thu, November 16		Report		Stadium: Round Rock Multipurpose Complex; Round Rock, Texas

8:00am CST	Colorado Mines	0–1	Grand Valley State	Field 2
Thu, November 16		Report		Stadium: Round Rock Multipurpose Complex; Round Rock, Texas

3:00pm CST	Grand Valley State	0–1	Oregon	Field OSP1
Thu, November 16		Report		Stadium: Round Rock Multipurpose Complex; Round Rock, Texas

3:00pm CST	Millersville	1–1	Colorado Mines	Field OSP2
Thu, November 16		Report		Stadium: Round Rock Multipurpose Complex; Round Rock, Texas

8:00am CST	Oregon	2–0	Colorado Mines	Field 4
Fri, November 17		Report		Stadium: Round Rock Multipurpose Complex; Round Rock, Texas

8:00am CST	Grand Valley State	6–1	Millersville	Field 5
Fri, November 17		Report		Stadium: Round Rock Multipurpose Complex; Round Rock, Texas

Group D
Pos	Team	Pld	W	D	L	GF	GA	GD	Pts	Qualification
1	UC-Santa Barbara	3	2	1	0	9	2	+7	7	Advanced to knockout stage
2	Virginia Tech	3	1	1	1	6	3	+3	4	
3	Quinnipiac	3	1	0	2	4	10	−6	3	
4	Arkansas	3	1	0	2	4	8	−4	3	

Scores

9:45am CST	UCSB	4–1	Quinnipiac	Field OSP1
Thu, November 16		Report		Stadium: Round Rock Multipurpose Complex; Round Rock, Texas

9:45am CST	Arkansas	2–1	Virginia Tech	Field OSP2
Thu, November 16		Report		Stadium: Round Rock Multipurpose Complex; Round Rock, Texas

4:45pm CST	Virginia Tech	1–1	UCSB	Field OSP3
Thu, November 16		Report		Stadium: Round Rock Multipurpose Complex; Round Rock, Texas

4:45pm CST	Quinnipiac	3–2	Arkansas	Field OSP4
Thu, November 16		Report		Stadium: Round Rock Multipurpose Complex; Round Rock, Texas

8:00am CST	UCSB	4–0	Arkansas	Field 6
Fri, November 17		Report		Stadium: Round Rock Multipurpose Complex; Round Rock, Texas

8:00am CST	Virginia Tech	4–0	Quinnipiac	Field OSP1
Fri, November 17		Report		Stadium: Round Rock Multipurpose Complex; Round Rock, Texas

Group E
Pos	Team	Pld	W	D	L	GF	GA	GD	Pts	Qualification
1	San Diego State	3	3	0	0	7	1	+6	9	Advanced to knockout stage
2	Colorado "Black"	3	2	0	1	3	3	0	6	
3	Vermont	3	1	0	2	4	5	−1	3	
4	Oakland	3	0	0	3	2	7	−5	0	

Scores

9:45am CST	Colorado "Black"	2–1	Oakland	Field OSP3
Thu, November 16		Report		Stadium: Round Rock Multipurpose Complex; Round Rock, Texas

9:45am CST	Vermont	1–3	San Diego State	Field OSP4
Thu, November 16		Report		Stadium: Round Rock Multipurpose Complex; Round Rock, Texas

4:45pm CST	San Diego State	2–0	Colorado "Black"	Field OSP5
Thu, November 16		Report		Stadium: Round Rock Multipurpose Complex; Round Rock, Texas

4:45pm CST	Oakland	1–3	Vermont	Field 2
Thu, November 16		Report		Stadium: Round Rock Multipurpose Complex; Round Rock, Texas

8:00am CST	Colorado "Black"	1–0	Vermont	Field OSP4
Fri, November 17		Report		Stadium: Round Rock Multipurpose Complex; Round Rock, Texas

8:00am CST	San Diego State	2–0	Oakland	Field OSP5
Fri, November 17		Report		Stadium: Round Rock Multipurpose Complex; Round Rock, Texas

Group F
Pos	Team	Pld	W	D	L	GF	GA	GD	Pts	Qualification
1	UC Davis	3	2	1	0	4	0	+4	7	Advanced to knockout stage
2	Alabama	3	1	2	0	2	1	+1	5	
3	Texas A&M	3	1	0	2	2	2	0	3	
4	Miami (OH)	3	0	1	2	1	6	−5	1	

Scores

9:45am CST	Texas A&M	0–1	Alabama	Field OSP5
Thu, November 16		Report		Stadium: Round Rock Multipurpose Complex; Round Rock, Texas

9:45am CST	UC Davis	3–0	Miami (OH)	Field 2
Thu, November 16		Report		Stadium: Round Rock Multipurpose Complex; Round Rock, Texas

4:45pm CST	Miami (OH)	0–2	Texas A&M	Field OSP1
Thu, November 16		Report		Stadium: Round Rock Multipurpose Complex; Round Rock, Texas

4:45pm CST	Alabama	0–0	UC Davis	Field OSP2
Thu, November 16		Report		Stadium: Round Rock Multipurpose Complex; Round Rock, Texas

8:00am CST	Texas A&M	0–1	UC Davis	Field 7
Fri, November 17		Report		Stadium: Round Rock Multipurpose Complex; Round Rock, Texas

8:00am CST	Miami (OH)	1–1	Alabama	Field 8
Fri, November 17		Report		Stadium: Round Rock Multipurpose Complex; Round Rock, Texas

== Tournament bracket ==
=== Men's championship ===
Sweet 16
Fri • 10:00am • Field 7
BYU	2
UConn	0
Fri • 10:00am • Field 8
Indiana	0
Georgia Tech	3
Fri • 10:00am • Field 9
UCLA	2
Oregon	1
Fri • 10:00am • Field 10
Michigan	6
Georgetown	1
Fri • 1:00pm • Field 7
Minnesota	0
Rutgers	1
Fri • 1:00pm • Field 8
Missouri	0 (1)
Virginia Tech (pen.)	0 (3)
Fri • 1:00pm • Field 9
Cornell	0
Colorado State	1
Fri • 1:00pm • Field 10
Ohio State (pen.)	2 (7)
Arizona State	2 (6)

Quarterfinals
Fri • 5:00pm • Field 5
BYU (a.e.t)	2
Georgia Tech	0
Fri • 5:00pm • Field 6
UCLA (pen.)	1 (4)
Michigan	1 (3)
Fri • 7:00pm • Field 5
Rutgers	1
Virginia Tech (a.e.t)	2
Fri • 7:00pm • Field 6
Colorado State	2 (4)
Ohio State (pen.)	2 (5)

Semifinals
Sat • 10:00am • Field 5
BYU	2
UCLA	0
Sat • 10:00am • Field 6
Virginia Tech (a.e.t)	1
Ohio State	0

Final
Sat • 3:00pm • Field 2
BYU	2
Virginia Tech	0

==== Men's consolation ====
Quarterfinals
Fri • 3:00pm • Field 7
Florida (pen.)	1 (2)
Wisconsin	1 (1)
Fri • 3:00pm • Field 8
Illinois	2
Texas Tech	1
Fri • 5:00pm • Field 7
Texas	4
Colorado	0
Fri • 5:00pm • Field 8
Northeastern	1
North Carolina	3

Semifinals
Sat • 8:00am • Field 7
Florida	2
Illinois	4
Sat • 8:00am • Field 8
Texas	6
North Carolina	4

Final
Sat • 1:00pm • Field 7
Illinois	1
Texas	0

=== Women's championship ===
Sweet 16
Fri • 10:00am • Field 7
Michigan State	1
North Carolina	0
Fri • 10:00am • Field 8
Vanderbilt	1
Michigan	0
Fri • 10:00am • Field 9
Florida (pen.)	0 (4)
Ohio State	0 (2)
Fri • 10:00am • Field 10
Boston College	2
Cornell	0
Fri • 1:00pm • Field 7
Cal Poly (pen.)	0 (3)
Colorado	0 (0)
Fri • 1:00pm • Field 8
South Carolina	0
Colorado State	2
Fri • 1:00pm • Field 9
UCLA	2
Northeastern	0
Fri • 1:00pm • Field 10
Minnesota	0
Virginia	2

Quarterfinals
Fri • 5:00pm • Field 5
Michigan State	0
Vanderbilt	1
Fri • 5:00pm • Field 6
Florida	0
Boston College (a.e.t)	1
Fri • 7:00pm • Field 5
Cal Poly	4
Colorado State	3
Fri • 7:00pm • Field 6
UCLA (a.e.t)	3
Virginia	2

Semifinals
Sat • 10:00am • Field 9
Vanderbilt	0
Boston College	1
Sat • 10:00am • Field 10
Cal Poly	0
UCLA	2

Final
Sat • 5:00pm • Field 1
Boston College	0
UCLA	1

==== Women's consolation ====
Quarterfinals
Fri • 3:00pm • Field 9
Iowa State	2
Texas	3
Fri • 3:00pm • Field 10
Arizona State	0
Purdue	2
Fri • 5:00pm • Field 9
Kansas	5
TCU	0
Fri • 5:00pm • Field 10
Boise State	1
Illinois	2

Semifinals
Sat • 8:00am • Field 9
Texas	0
Purdue	2
Sat • 8:00am • Field 10
Kansas	1
Illinois	2

Final
Sat • 1:00pm • Field 8
Purdue	0 (4)
Illinois (pen.)	0 (5)

=== Men's open ===
Quarterfinals
Fri • 7:00pm • Field 7
Cincinnati	2
Weber State	1
Fri • 7:00pm • Field 8
Purdue	1
Kansas	0
Fri • 7:00pm • Field 9
Colorado College	2
Tampa	0
Fri • 7:00pm • Field 10
Miami (OH)	2
Cal Poly	0

Semifinals
Sat • 8:00am • Field 5
Cincinnati	0 (3)
Purdue (pen.)	0 (4)
Sat • 8:00am • Field 6
Colorado College	0
Miami (OH)	1

Final
Sat • 1:00pm • Field 6
Purdue	1
Miami (OH)	3

=== Women's open ===
Quarterfinals
Fri • 3:00pm • Field 3
UConn	2
UC Davis	1
Fri • 3:00pm • Field 4
San Diego State	3
Grand Valley State	1
Fri • 3:00pm • Field 5
Oregon	2
LSU	0
Fri • 3:00pm • Field 6
UC-Santa Barbara	2
UCF	0

Semifinals
Sat • 8:00am • Field 3
UConn	0
San Diego State	2
Sat • 8:00am • Field 4
Oregon	1 (2)
UC-Santa Barbara (pen.)	1 (4)

Final
Sat • 1:00pm • Field 4
San Diego State (a.e.t)	2
UC-Santa Barbara	1

== All-tournament teams ==
Note: Only semifinalist players were eligible for selections

Key
MVP
Best goalkeeper

=== Men's championship ===
#	Name	Team
5	Benjamin Gonzalez	BYU
00	Chris Jenkinson	BYU
7	Ciaran Hornon	UCLA
10	Michael Crisera	UCLA
30	Jacob Honner	Ohio State
18	Asher Lackman	Ohio State
1	Duke Durand	Virginia Tech
12	Benjamin Hiebler	Virginia Tech
24	Nicholas Washington	Virginia Tech
4	Nathan Mumford	BYU
15	Asher Franks	BYU
27	Andrew Fiocca	Virginia Tech

=== Women's championship ===
#	Name	Team
8	Mia Kim	UCLA
0	Isabelle Southern	UCLA
1	Olivia Perez	Colorado State
5	Kaitlin Spiridellis	Vanderbilt
2	Sasha Asselbaye	Vanderbilt
17	Nina Toracca	Cal Poly
19	Marissa Gorog	Boston College
4	Camille Longabardi	Boston College
27	Kylie Skiba	Boston College
13	Linda Boama	Boston College
6	Allison Shea	UCLA
17	Brooklyn Horst	UCLA

=== Men's open ===
#	Name	Team
19	Noah Hjelmeng	Miami (OH)
99	Christian Calabro	Purdue
14	Bobo Kikonda	Cincinnati
18	Hogan Daley	Cincinnati
9	Jaiden Marriott	Weber State
28	Lucas Summers	Cal Poly
9	Mark Reiss	Colorado College
10	Youssef Errihani	Purdue
11	Nicholas Wilson	Purdue
25	Robert Boychyn	Purdue
17	Maddox Jung	Miami (OH)
5	Ryan Gora	Miami (OH)

=== Women's open ===
#	Name	Team
3	Alex Guzzardo	San Diego State
0	Kiley Quillen	UC Santa Barbara
23	Maya Presume	UConn
4	Maya Pickhart	Oregon
16	Sven Nuenfinger	Oregon
17	Grace Truman	San Diego State
11	Karoline Lundstrom	San Diego State
18	Katherine Montoya	UC Santa Barbara
25	Allison Holloman	UC Santa Barbara
9	Naiya Samios	UC Santa Barbara
13	Lauren Edwards	Oregon
8	Emma Duckett	San Diego State
