= 2022 SCSA Regional Tournament =

- Association: NIRSA
- League: Southeast Collegiate Soccer Alliance
- Sport: Soccer
- Site: ECU's North Recreational Complex; Greenville, NC
- Duration: October 28–30, 2022
- Teams: 16 (men's); 12 (women's)

Men's Championship Division
- Score: 5–1
- Champion: North Carolina (2nd title, 5th title game)
- Runners-up: William & Mary (1st title game)
- Season MVP: Calvin Ryan (North Carolina)

Women's Championship Division
- Champion: Virginia (2nd title, 2nd title game)
- Runners-up: Florida State (1st title game)
- Season MVP: Gracie Heil

Southeast Collegiate Soccer Alliance seasons
- ← 2021 2023 →

The 2022 Southeast Collegiate Soccer Alliance Regional Tournament was the 12th edition of the Southeast Collegiate Soccer Alliance's postseason club soccer tournament, which was held at ECU's North Recreational Complex in Greenville, North Carolina, from October 28–30, 2022. A tournament was held for each the men's and women's division, with each tournament champion receiving an automatic bid to the 2022 NIRSA National Soccer Championships' championship division. The remaining 2 of NIRSA Region II's automatic bids for each division were given out based on RPI, with a special consideration to this tournament's performance.

== Format ==
The tournament consisted of 12 women's teams and 16 men's teams. Each divisional champion received an automatic bid (6 for the women and 8 for the men) with the remaining wild card teams being the next highest RPI ranked teams that had not already qualified. Teams were divided into groups based on RPI.

For the men's division group stage, the 16 teams were split into four groups of four teams each. Each team played every other team in their group meaning a total of 6 games were played within a group. The top two teams from each group advanced to the round of 8.

For the women's division group stage, the 12 teams were split into four groups of three teams each. Each team played every other team in their group meaning a total of 3 games were played within a group. The top two teams from each group advanced to the round of 8.

Pool play games were two 35-minute halves, separated by a seven-minute halftime and utilized the three points for a win system. After pool play, the two highest ranked teams from each group advanced to their respective gender division's knockout stage.

Tie-breaking criteria for group play
The ranking of teams in each group was based on the following criteria in order:
1. Highest number of points
2. Winner of head-to-head competition
3. Greatest goal difference
  - Maximum ± 5 goal difference per match
4. Most goals scored
5. Most shutouts

In a tie-breaking scenario involving more than 2 teams, the tiebreaker procedure would begin. If one team is identified as different and both remaining teams are still tied, the procedure is restarted.

If a tie still remained after the first 5 criteria, the following was used to break a tie:

1. NCAA kicks from the mark
  - If there was a three-way tie, a coin-flip would be conducted. The two teams that chose the same outcome would compete in kicks from the mark between each other. The winner would compete with the last remaining team in kicks from the mark
  - If there's a four-way tie, a drawing of lots would be conducted

Knockout stage games also consisted of two 35-minute halves. The quarterfinals were separated by a seven-minute halftime while the semifinals and finals had a ten minute halftime. Knockout stage games needed to declare a winner. If a knockout-stage game was tied at the end of regulation, overtime would begin. Overtime consisted of one, 15-minute, golden-goal period. If still tied after overtime, kicks from the mark would determine the winner.

== Participants ==
=== Men's ===
Divisional champions
Division	Team	Appearance	Last bid
Atlantic South	North Carolina	12th	2021
Coastal North	Florida	11th	2021
Mountain East	Clemson	9th	2021
Mountain West	Auburn	6th	2019
Coastal South	Miami	4th	2021
Atlantic North	JMU	3rd	2021
Mountain North	Kentucky	2nd	2014
Mid-Atlantic	Wake Forest	1st	Never

Wild cards
Division	Team	Appearance	Last bid
Atlantic North	Virginia	11th	2021
Coastal South	UCF	10th	2021
Atlantic North	Virginia Tech	8th	2021
Mountain East	Georgia Tech	7th	2021
Mountain North	Tennessee	4th	2021
Coastal South	USF	4th	2019
Atlantic North	William & Mary	3rd	2021
Mid-Atlantic	Elon	3rd	2015

=== Women's ===
Divisional champions
Division	Team	Appearance	Last bid
Florida	Florida	12th	2021
Northeast	North Carolina	12th	2021
North	Virginia Tech	12th	2021
Northwest	Vanderbilt	8th	2021
Southwest	Georgia Tech	5th	2021
Southeast	South Carolina	1st	Never

Wild cards
Division	Team	Appearance	Last bid
North	Virginia	11th	2021
Northeast	East Carolina	7th	2021
Florida	Florida State	6th	2021
Northeast	Wake Forest	3rd	2021
North	William & Mary	2nd	2021
Southwest	Alabama	2nd	2011

== Group stage ==
Note: Scores obtained through SCSA's IMLeagues, however uncited because it's a primary source and generally unreliable.

=== Men's ===
Group A
Pos	Team	Pld	W	D	L	GF	GA	GD	Pts	Qualification
1	Clemson	3	2	1	0	3	1	+2	7	Advanced to knockout stage
2	Miami	3	1	2	0	3	1	+2	5	Advanced to knockout stage
3	Elon	3	0	2	1	1	2	−1	2	
4	Georgia Tech	3	0	1	2	1	4	−3	1	

Scores

7:00pm EST	Clemson	1–0	Elon	Field 8
Fri, October 28				Stadium: ECU's North Recreational Complex; Greenville, NC

7:00pm EST	Miami	2–0	Georgia Tech	Field 3
Fri, October 28				Stadium: ECU's North Recreational Complex; Greenville, NC

8:30am EST	Clemson	1–1	Miami	Field 3
Sat, October 29				Stadium: ECU's North Recreational Complex; Greenville, NC

8:30am EST	Georgia Tech	1–1	Elon	Field 4
Sat, October 29				Stadium: ECU's North Recreational Complex; Greenville, NC

11:30am EST	Elon	0–0	Miami	Field 6
Sat, October 29				Stadium: ECU's North Recreational Complex; Greenville, NC

11:30am EST	Georgia Tech	0–1	Clemson	Field 5
Sat, October 29				Stadium: ECU's North Recreational Complex; Greenville, NC

Group B
Pos	Team	Pld	W	D	L	GF	GA	GD	Pts	Qualification
1	North Carolina	3	3	0	0	8	0	+8	9	Advanced to knockout stage
2	Tennessee	3	2	0	1	4	5	−1	6	Advanced to knockout stage
3	USF	3	0	1	2	1	3	−2	1	
4	Wake Forest	3	0	1	2	3	8	−5	1	

Scores

7:00pm EST	North Carolina	1–0	USF	Field 6
Fri, October 28				Stadium: ECU's North Recreational Complex; Greenville, NC

7:00pm EST	Tennessee	3–2	Wake Forest	Field 7
Fri, October 28				Stadium: ECU's North Recreational Complex; Greenville, NC

8:30am EST	North Carolina	4–0	Wake Forest	Field 6
Sat, October 29				Stadium: ECU's North Recreational Complex; Greenville, NC

8:30am EST	USF	0–1	Tennessee	Field 7
Sat, October 29				Stadium: ECU's North Recreational Complex; Greenville, NC

11:30am EST	Tennessee	0–3	North Carolina	Field 8
Sat, October 29				Stadium: ECU's North Recreational Complex; Greenville, NC

11:30am EST	USF	1–1	Wake Forest	Field 3
Sat, October 29				Stadium: ECU's North Recreational Complex; Greenville, NC

Group C
Pos	Team	Pld	W	D	L	GF	GA	GD	Pts	Qualification
1	JMU	3	3	0	0	6	2	+4	9	Advanced to knockout stage
2	Florida	3	2	0	1	5	3	+2	6	Advanced to knockout stage
3	Virginia	3	1	0	2	4	5	−1	3	
4	Kentucky	3	0	0	3	3	8	−5	0	

Scores

8:30pm EST	JMU	2–1	Kentucky	Field 3
Fri, October 28				Stadium: ECU's North Recreational Complex; Greenville, NC

8:30pm EST	Florida	2–0	Virginia	Field 4
Fri, October 28				Stadium: ECU's North Recreational Complex; Greenville, NC

10:00am EST	Kentucky	1–3	Virginia	Field 3
Sat, October 29				Stadium: ECU's North Recreational Complex; Greenville, NC

10:00am EST	JMU	2–0	Florida	Field 8
Sat, October 29				Stadium: ECU's North Recreational Complex; Greenville, NC

2:00pm EST	Virginia	1–2	JMU	Field 4
Sat, October 29				Stadium: ECU's North Recreational Complex; Greenville, NC

2:00pm EST	Kentucky	1–3	Florida	Field 5
Sat, October 29				Stadium: ECU's North Recreational Complex; Greenville, NC

Group D
Pos	Team	Pld	W	D	L	GF	GA	GD	Pts	Qualification
1	Virginia Tech	3	2	1	0	3	0	+3	7	Advanced to knockout stage
2	William & Mary	3	1	1	1	3	4	−1	4	Advanced to knockout stage
3	UCF	3	1	0	2	5	5	0	3	
4	Auburn	3	1	0	2	4	6	−2	3	

Scores

8:30pm EST	UCF	4–1	Auburn	Field 6
Fri, October 28				Stadium: ECU's North Recreational Complex; Greenville, NC

8:30pm EST	Virginia Tech	0–0	William & Mary	Field 7
Fri, October 28				Stadium: ECU's North Recreational Complex; Greenville, NC

10:00am EST	UCF	0–2	Virginia Tech	Field 6
Sat, October 29				Stadium: ECU's North Recreational Complex; Greenville, NC

10:00am EST	Auburn	3–1	William & Mary	Field 7
Sat, October 29				Stadium: ECU's North Recreational Complex; Greenville, NC

2:00pm EST	Auburn	0–1	Virginia Tech	Field 7
Sat, October 29				Stadium: ECU's North Recreational Complex; Greenville, NC

2:00pm EST	William & Mary	2–1	UCF	Field 6
Sat, October 29				Stadium: ECU's North Recreational Complex; Greenville, NC

=== Women's ===
Group A
Pos	Team	Pld	W	D	L	GF	GA	GD	Pts	Qualification
1	Virginia	2	2	0	0	2	0	+2	6	Advanced to knockout stage
2	North Carolina	2	1	0	1	3	2	+1	3	Advanced to knockout stage
3	South Carolina	2	0	0	2	1	4	−3	0	

Scores

7:00pm EST	South Carolina	0–1	Virginia	Field 4
Fri, October 28				Stadium: ECU's North Recreational Complex; Greenville, NC

8:30am EST	North Carolina	0–1	Virginia	Field 8
Sat, October 29				Stadium: ECU's North Recreational Complex; Greenville, NC

11:30am EST	North Carolina	3–1	South Carolina	Field 4
Sat, October 29				Stadium: ECU's North Recreational Complex; Greenville, NC

Group B
Pos	Team	Pld	W	D	L	GF	GA	GD	Pts	Qualification
1	Virginia Tech	2	2	0	0	4	1	+3	6	Advanced to knockout stage
2	East Carolina	2	0	1	1	1	2	−1	1	Advanced to knockout stage
3	Wake Forest	2	0	1	1	0	2	−2	1	

Scores

7:00pm EST	East Carolina	0–0	Wake Forest	Field 5
Fri, October 28				Stadium: ECU's North Recreational Complex; Greenville, NC

8:30am EST	Virginia Tech	2–0	Wake Forest	Field 5
Sat, October 29				Stadium: ECU's North Recreational Complex; Greenville, NC

11:30am EST	Virginia Tech	2–1	East Carolina	Field 7
Sat, October 29				Stadium: ECU's North Recreational Complex; Greenville, NC

Group C
Pos	Team	Pld	W	D	L	GF	GA	GD	Pts	Qualification
1	Vanderbilt	2	1	1	0	3	0	+3	4	Advanced to knockout stage
2	Florida	2	0	2	0	1	1	0	2	Advanced to knockout stage
3	Alabama	2	0	1	1	1	4	−3	1	

Scores

8:30pm EST	Alabama	0–3	Vanderbilt	Field 8
Fri, October 28				Stadium: ECU's North Recreational Complex; Greenville, NC

10:00am EST	Florida	0–0	Vanderbilt	Field 4
Sat, October 29				Stadium: ECU's North Recreational Complex; Greenville, NC

2:00pm EST	Florida	1–1	Alabama	Field 3
Sat, October 29				Stadium: ECU's North Recreational Complex; Greenville, NC

Group D
Pos	Team	Pld	W	D	L	GF	GA	GD	Pts	Qualification
1	Georgia Tech	2	2	0	0	7	1	+6	6	Advanced to knockout stage
2	Florida State	2	1	0	1	6	3	+3	3	Advanced to knockout stage
3	William & Mary	2	0	0	2	1	10	−9	0	

Scores

8:30pm EST	Florida State	5–1	William & Mary	Field 5
Fri, October 28				Stadium: ECU's North Recreational Complex; Greenville, NC

10:00am EST	Georgia Tech	5–0	William & Mary	Field 5
Sat, October 29				Stadium: ECU's North Recreational Complex; Greenville, NC

2:00pm EST	Florida State	1–2	Georgia Tech	Field 8
Sat, October 29				Stadium: ECU's North Recreational Complex; Greenville, NC

== Tournament bracket ==
=== Men's ===
Quarterfinals
Sat • 4:30pm • Field 8
Clemson	1
Tennessee	0
Sat • 4:30pm • Field 3
North Carolina	1
Miami	0
Sat • 6:00pm • Field 3
Virginia Tech	0
Florida	2
Sat • 6:00pm • Field 4
JMU	0
William & Mary	1

Semifinals
Sun • 8:00am • Field 8
Clemson	1
North Carolina	2
Sun • 8:00am • Field 3
Florida	1
William & Mary	2

Final
Sun • 11:00am • Field 3
North Carolina	5
William & Mary	1

=== Women's ===
Quarterfinals
Sat • 4:30pm • Field 4
Virginia	3
East Carolina	0
Sat • 4:30pm • Field 7
Virginia Tech	1
North Carolina	0
Sat • 6:00pm • Field 5
Vanderbilt	0
Florida State	1
Sat • 6:00pm • Field 7
Georgia Tech	1
Florida	0

Semifinals
Sun • 8:00am • Field 5
Virginia	1
Virginia Tech	0
Sun • 8:00am • Field 7
Florida State	1
Georgia Tech	0

Final
Sun • 11:00am • Field 4
Virginia
Florida State

== All tournament teams ==
Note: only players on teams in the semifinals were eligible.

=== Men's ===
Name	Team
Calvin Ryan (MVP)	North Carolina
Dylan Collins	Clemson
Devin Ortega	Florida
Raphael Espinosa	William & Mary
Jason Kline	William & Mary
Sam Loyack	North Carolina
William Kelson	North Carolina
Luka Noronha	North Carolina

=== Women's ===
Name	Team
Gracie Heil (MVP)	Virginia
Madeline Simpson	Virginia
Gracie Williams	Virginia
Ava Lohmann	Virginia
Ava Pizzuto	Florida State
Jordan Rolli	Florida State
Jordan Turner	Virginia Tech
Katie Chuckran	Georgia Tech

== National Championship performance ==
=== Men's ===
Region II championship teams
Team	Qualification	App	Last bid	Result
North Carolina	Tournament champion	17th	2021	Quarterfinalist (1–2 a.e.t. vs Minnesota)
Clemson	Highest RPI remaining teams	4th	2003	Consolation quarterfinalist (0–3 vs USC)
William & Mary	2nd highest RPI remaining teams	1st	Never	Consolation co-champ (Finals canceled)
JMU	National wildcard	4th	2021	Consolation semifinalist (0–2 vs William & Mary)
Florida	National wildcard	14th	2019	Consolation semifinalist (2–3 vs USC)

=== Women's ===
Team	Qualification	App	Last bid	Performance
Virginia	Tournament champion	12th	2021	Consolation champion
Vanderbilt	Highest RPI remaining teams	1st	Never	Sweet 16 (0–1 vs Cal Poly)
Virginia Tech	2nd highest RPI remaining teams	16th	2019	Sweet 16 (1–2 vs Michigan)
Florida State	National wildcard	4th	2016	Consolation semifinalist (0–2 vs Virginia)
Georgia Tech	National wildcard	2nd	2021	Consolation quarterfinalist (0–2 vs Florida State)
