= Kentucky Wildcats men's club soccer =

Kentucky Club Soccer
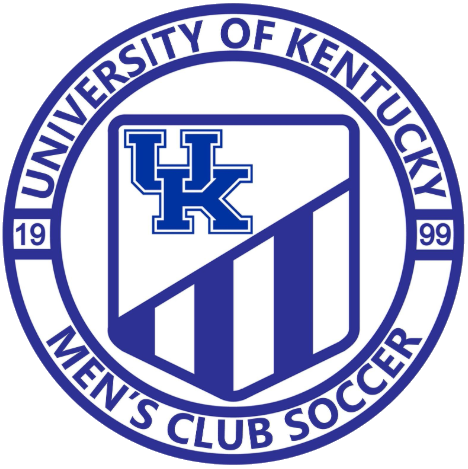
- Full name: University of Kentucky Men's Club Soccer
- Nickname(s): Wildcats
- Founded: 1964; 61 years ago
- Ground: Lexington, Kentucky
- League: NIRSA Region II
- Website: ukyclubsoccer
colors

The University of Kentucky Men's Club Soccer (also referred as "Kentucky Wildcats men's club soccer team"), is an intercollegiate club soccer team representing the University of Kentucky (UK). The club team is considered a non-varsity team, meaning funding is comparatively limited and in turn requires most of the funds to be raised internally.

Currently, Kentucky is a member of NIRSA's Southeast Collegiate Soccer Alliance (mostly known as "Region II").

== History ==
=== Beginnings ===
Men's soccer at the University of Kentucky can be traced back to 1964, when Dr. Abdelmonem Rizk, a physical education professor at UK, formed an organized soccer team of UK students with the intention of eventually creating a varsity soccer team. Two years later, in 1966, Rizk started the first SEC Tournament which was held in Knoxville where Kentucky finished third. The following year, Kentucky were SEC champions.

As the game grew in popularity, Rizk decided to split the pool of players into five separate teams: the main/highest level "A" team, the lower-level "B" or "JV" team, the "Graduate" team of all graduate students, the "Persia" team of mostly foreign students, and the women's team, which was formed for the first time in 1979. Unable to coach five separate teams, Rizk became the broader "head of the soccer program" and allowed the all non-A teams to be self-organized. In 1976, Rizk appointed David Mossbrook to be the head coach of the main A-team, but due to lack of funding Mossbrook operated as a volunteer like Rizk. Mossbrook would go on to coach for 11 years until 1987, only having a season below .500 in 1983 when they went 10–11. After Mossbrook departed, Sam Wooten would take over. Despite the club's success and following all NCAA regulations, UK still wouldn't obtain varsity status until 3 years after Mossbrook left.

=== Varsity team created ===
On December 10, 1990, 26 years after Rizk's first team, the University of Kentucky voted to alleviate soccer from a club to a varsity sport, meaning the team would be able to get the funding it needed and would be able to compete against other collegiate varsity teams. The upgrade to UK's varsity team meant the "club team" would dissolve due to a majority of players, including coach Sam Wooten who would coach until 1994, would shift to play with the varsity team. Having fulfilled his ultimate goal, Rizk, the head of soccer since 1964, would step away from the team after the 1990 season and retire from the university in 1992.

Despite having a full varsity team, many students who didn't want to deal with the time and physical commitment needed for a varsity athlete, but wanted to play soccer at a high level felt that the old club soccer method was a great solution. This led to the re-creation of a separate club soccer team in 1995. However, now that Lexington had an NCAA DI varsity soccer team, it became much more difficult to convince outside entities to volunteer as a coach, meaning the team would be player-coached.

The following year, in 1996, Kentucky would participate in the first of what would be a regular tournament for them called Clemson's Socctoberfest in Clemson, SC. It's known they competed in at least the first 8 editions of the competition and advanced from the group stage for the first time in 2000 where they lost in the quarterfinals to Virginia Tech.

=== Joining the SCSL and SCSA ===
In 2002, UK would join the SCSL, a NIRSA affiliated league, meaning they would have a consistent pool of teams to play against and would be able to travel to Tupelo, Mississippi where all league members were invited to compete in a regional tournament. This year also saw them win their first Clemson Socctoberfest. The following year, in 2003, UK would have its best regional tournament performance by advancing to the semifinals where they would lose to Mississippi State, who had previously beat them in the quarterfinals of the Clemson Socctoberfest. UK would end the season being ranked 2nd in the region, but would not receive a bid to the 2003 national championship in Tuscaloosa, Alabama.

In 2005, the SCSL folded. Luckily, NIRSA's other Region II-affiliated league, later known as the Southeast Collegiate Soccer Alliance (SCSA), would allow all SCSL teams to join, including UK who accepted the offer. Unlike the SCSL who invited all their members to compete in the regional tournament, the regional tournament for the SCSA was invite-only due to them having more members. UK were unable to qualify for the regional tournament again until 2014 when they became Mountain West divisional champions. After the first round of games in Winston-Salem, rain would see all remaining group stage matches cancelled meaning all 16 teams would advance to the knockout round. UK would beat Georgia College 3–2 in extra time but would lose to eventual finalist, UCF, in the quarterfinals. This would be UK's best SCSA seasonal performance but would not qualify for the 2014 national tournament. The following year, in 2015, despite only losing one regular season game, UK would not qualify for the regional tournament and wouldn't return for another 7 years.

=== Reorganization ===
Kentucky would participate in the SCSA until 2019 when two forfeits in the 2018 regular season caused by a lack of players forced them to be removed from the league. The following year, UK would play against local teams as an independent club, similar to how they operated from 1995 to 2002, but the COVID-19 pandemic would all but see the team dissolve due to restrictions regarding in-person interactions that were in effect for over a year.

Despite them being unable to meet in person, a small group of players would help keep the team's affiliation with the university and in 2021 were allowed to resume in-person activities. UK would rejoin NIRSA's SCSA this season, but due to them being removed in the 2018 season, they would have to be "associate" members for a year, meaning they would have to display the ability to play in 3 matches against NIRSA-affiliated opponents without the assistance of the league scheduling games. Being associate members also meant UK would be ineligible for the regional and national tournament. UK would successfully accomplish this goal, meaning the following year they'd once again be full NIRSA and SCSA members. The 2021 season saw UK advance to the semifinals of Clemson's Socctoberfest tournament despite losing their first group stage match to hosts Clemson “A” and tying their second match against Auburn.

In their first season back as full NIRSA members in the fall of 2022, UK would tie their first 2 regular season games but would go on to win their next four, which would be enough for them to become Mountain North divisional champions and automatically qualify for the 2022 SCSA Regional Tournament, their first regional tournament appearance in eight years. The tournament was hosted at ECU's NRC in Greenville, NC. This year also saw them, once again, advance to the semifinals of Clemson's Socctoberfest tournament, despite losing their first group stage match to in-state rival Louisville on a last second kick and tying their second match against UNC-Charlotte 1–1.

In 2023, UK would advance to Clemson's Socctoberfest finals for the first time since their 2002 championship but would lose to NC State who they previously beat 2–1 in the group stage. They would also qualify for the 2023 SCSA Regional Tournament, marking the first time they'd qualify in back to back tournaments since joining the SCSA. They would tie all three group stage matches 1–1 but failed to advance out of the group on the goals-for tiebreaker. The following year, UK would win the Clemson Socctoberfest tournament for the first time since 2002 and would once again qualify for the regional tournament as a wildcard but two opening losses to Georgia Tech and NC State would eliminate them before their first regional win in 10 years against divisional opponent Tennessee 1–0. Following this season, striker Hunter Sekelsky would be named to the inaugural US College Club Soccer (USCCS) all-American roster.

== Honors ==
- 1968 SEC Tournament champions
- 1981 SEC Tournament finalists
- 2002 Clemson Socctoberfest champions
- 2003 SCSL Regional Tournament semifinalist
- 2014 Mountain West divisional champions
- 2014 SCSA Regional tournament quarterfinalist
- 2021 Clemson Socctoberfest semifinalist
- 2022 Clemson Socctoberfest semifinalist
- 2022 Mountain North divisional champions
- 2022 SCSA Regional tournament group stage
- 2023 Clemson Socctoberfest finalist
- 2023 Mountain North divisional champions
- 2023 SCSA Regional tournament group stage
- 2024 Clemson Socctoberfest champions
- 2024 SCSA Regional tournament group stage
- 2024 USCCS All-American selection (Hunter Sekelsky)

== Notes ==
- Information about the 2014 season was obtained through the SCSA's Twitter, but uncited because generally unreliable
- Some info after 2018 obtained from UKMCS's official Instagram, but uncited because generally unreliable
