= Rating percentage index =

Sports team ranking

The rating percentage index, commonly known as the RPI, is a quantity used to rank sports teams based upon a team's wins and losses and its strength of schedule. It is one of the sports rating systems by which NCAA basketball, baseball, softball, hockey, soccer, lacrosse, and volleyball teams are ranked. This system was in use from 1981 through 2018 to aid in the selecting and seeding of teams appearing in the NCAA Division I men's basketball tournament as well as in the women's tournament from its inception in 1982 through 2020.

During the 2018 offseason, the NCAA announced that the RPI would no longer be used in the selection process for the Division I men's basketball tournament. Effective immediately, it was replaced with the NCAA Evaluation Tool (NET).

In its current formulation, the index comprises a team's winning percentage (25%), its opponents' winning percentage (50%), and the winning percentage of those opponents' opponents (25%). The opponents' winning percentage and the winning percentage of those opponents' opponents both comprise the strength of schedule (SOS). Thus, the SOS accounts for 75% of the RPI calculation and is 2/3 its opponents' winning percentage and 1/3 its opponents' opponents' winning percentages.

The RPI lacks theoretical justification from a statistical standpoint. Other ranking systems which include the margin of victory of games played or other statistics in addition to the win/loss results have been shown to be a better predictor of the outcomes of future games. However, because the margin of victory has been manipulated in the past by teams or individuals in the context of gambling, the RPI can be used to mitigate motivation for such manipulation.

Some feel that the heavy emphasis upon strength of schedule gives an unfair advantage to teams from major conferences. Teams from "majors" are allowed to pick many of their non-conference opponents (often blatantly weaker teams). Teams from minor conferences, however, may only get one or two such opponents in their schedules. Also, some mid-major conferences regularly compel their member teams to schedule opponents ranked in the top half of the RPI, which could boost the strength of that conference and/or its tougher-scheduling teams. In basketball, the Missouri Valley Conference has successfully done this: It has become one of the top-rated RPI conferences, despite having very few of its teams ranked in the two national Top 25 polls. In 2006, the NCAA began to release its RPI calculations weekly starting in January. Independent sources, such as ESPN or CNN/SI, also publish their own RPI calculations, which are updated more frequently.

== Basketball formula ==
The current and commonly used formula for determining the RPI of a college basketball team at any given time is as follows.

RPI = (WP * 0.25) + (OWP * 0.50) + (OOWP * 0.25)

where WP is Winning Percentage, OWP is Opponents' Winning Percentage and OOWP is Opponents' Opponents' Winning Percentage.

The WP is calculated by taking a team's wins divided by the number of games it has played (i.e. wins plus losses).

For Division 1 NCAA Men's basketball, the WP factor of the RPI was updated in 2004 to account for differences in home, away, and neutral games. A home win now counts as 0.6 win, while a road win counts as 1.4 wins. Inversely, a home loss equals 1.4 losses, while a road loss counts as 0.6 loss. A neutral game counts as 1 win or 1 loss. This change was based on statistical data that consistently showed home teams in Division I basketball winning about two-thirds of the time. Note that this location adjustment applies only to the WP factor and not the OWP and OOWP factors. Only games against Division 1 teams are included for all RPI factors. As an example, if a team loses to Syracuse at home, beats them away, and then loses to Cincinnati away, their record would be 1–2. Considering the weighted aspect of the WP, their winning percentage is 1.4 / (1.4 + 1.4 + 0.6) = 0.4118

The OWP is calculated by taking the average of the WP's for each of the team's opponents with the requirement that all games against the team in question are removed from the equation. Continuing from the example above, assume Syracuse has played one other game and lost, while Cincinnati has played two other teams and won. The team in question has played Syracuse twice and therefore Syracuse must be counted twice. Thus the OWP of the team is (0/1 + 0/1 + 2/2) / 3 (number of opponents – Syracuse, Syracuse, Cincinnati). OWP = 0.3333

The OOWP is calculated by taking the average of each Opponent's OWP. Note that the team in question is part of the team's OOWP. In fact, the most re-occurring opponent of your opponents is the team in question.

Continuing the example above, a team has played Syracuse twice and Cincinnati once. Syracuse has played one other game and lost, while Cincinnati has played two other games and won. Next, for simplicity, assume none of the unnamed teams has played any other games.

The OOWP is calculated as (Syracuse's OWP + Syracuse's OWP + Cincinnati's OWP ) / 3.

Syracuse has played and beat the team in question (which, excluding the games against Syracuse, only lost to Cincinnati), lost to the team in question (excluding Syracuse, only lost to Cincinnati), and lost one other game (excluding Syracuse, this team has no WP). Syracuse's OWP is (0/1 + 0/1) / 2 = 0.0000.

Cincinnati has played the team in question (excluding Cincinnati, they went 1–1 vs. Syracuse) and won versus two other opponents each of which have no WP when games versus Cincinnati are excluded. Cincinnati's OWP is (1/2) / 1 = 0.5000.

For the team in question, the OOWP is thus (0.0000 + 0.0000 + 0.5000) / 3 = 0.1667

For the team in question, the RPI can now be calculated:

RPI = (WP * 0.25) + (OWP * 0.50) + (OOWP * 0.25)

Plugging in numbers from the above example gives you

RPI = (0.4117 * 0.25) + (0.3333 * 0.50) + (0.1667 * 0.25) = 0.3113

=== Extended example ===
Assume the following game results:

Home	Score	Away	Score
UConn	64	Kansas	57
UConn	82	Duke	68
Wisconsin	71	UConn	72
Kansas	69	UConn	62
Duke	81	Wisconsin	70
Wisconsin	52	Kansas	62

Here is the calculation of the WPs, OWPs, and OOWPs for each team:

WP

UConn: 3 / 4 = 0.7500 Weighted 2.6/3.2 = 0.8125
Kansas: 2 / 3 = 0.6667 Weighted 2.0/2.6 = 0.7692
Duke: 1 / 2 = 0.5000 Weighted 0.6/1.2 = 0.500
Wisconsin: 0 / 3 = 0.0000 Weighted 0/3.4 = 0.000

OWP

UConn: ((Kansas 1.0) + (Kansas 1.0) + (Duke 1.0) + (Wisconsin 0.0)) / (4 games) = 0.7500
Kansas: ((UConn 1.0) + (UConn 1.0) + (Wisconsin 0.0)) / (3 games) = 0.6667
Duke: ((UConn 0.6667) + (Wisconsin 0.0)) / (2 games) = 0.3333
Wisconsin: ((UConn 0.6667) + (Duke 0.0) + (Kansas 0.5)) / (3 games) = 0.3889

OOWP

UConn: ((Kansas 0.6667) + (Kansas 0.6667) + (Duke 0.3333) + (Wisconsin 0.3889)) / (4 games) = 0.5139
Kansas: ((UConn 0.7500) + (UConn 0.7500) + (Wisconsin 0.3889)) / (3 games) = 0.6296
Duke: ((UConn 0.7500) + (Wisconsin 0.3889)) / (2 games) = 0.5694
Wisconsin: ((UConn 0.7500) + (Duke 0.3333) + (Kansas 0.6667)) / (3 games) = 0.5833

These are then combined via the formula

RPI = (WP * 0.25) + (OWP * 0.50) + (OOWP * 0.25)

resulting in the following ratings:

UConn: 0.7066
Kansas: 0.6830
Duke: 0.4340
Wisconsin: 0.3403

The RPI formula also has many flaws. Due to the heavy weighting of opponents winning percentage, beating a team with a bad RPI may actually hurt your RPI. In addition, losing to a good RPI team can help your RPI.

=== Quadrants ===
Since 2018, one criterion for determining selection to the NCAA Tournament has been performance against certain RPI quadrants. Typically, a quadrant 1 win is considered a "good win", while a quadrant 4 loss is considered a "bad loss". The quadrants are defined as follows:

- Quadrant 1: Home games vs. RPI teams ranked in the top 30; neutral games vs. 1-50; away games vs. 1-75.
- Quadrant 2: Home vs. 31-75 teams; neutral vs. 51-100; away vs. 76-135.
- Quadrant 3: Home vs. 76-160 teams; neutral vs. 101-200; away vs. 136-240.
- Quadrant 4: Home vs. 161-plus teams; neutral vs. 201-plus; away vs. 241-plus.

The quadrant system is still in use under the new NET system, with RPI ranking replaced by NET ranking.

=== Replacement with NET for Division I basketball ===
The NCAA announced on August 22, 2018, that the RPI would no longer be used in the Division I men's basketball selection process and would be replaced by the aforementioned NET. This new metric takes the following into account:

- Game results
- Strength of schedule
- Game location (home, away, or neutral court)
- Scoring margin — While included in the NET, teams receive no extra credit for wins by more than 10 points. Additionally, overtime games are assigned a 1-point victory margin, regardless of the actual score.
- Net offensive and defensive efficiency
- Quality of wins and losses, using the existing quadrant system

Game date and order are not included in the NET—all games are treated equally, whether an early-season matchup or a conference tournament championship game.

== Baseball formula ==
The formula used in NCAA baseball is the same as that used in basketball except for the adjustment of home and road records. Starting in 2013, college baseball RPI formula values each road victory as 1.3 instead of 1.0. Each home win is valued at 0.7 instead of 1.0. Conversely, each home loss counts 1.3 against a team’s RPI and each road loss counts 0.7 against a team’s RPI. Neutral-site games have a value of 1.0, but the committee is studying how to determine if a game should be considered a neutral-site contest. The adjustment is based on data showing that home teams win about 62 percent of the time in Division I baseball." The change was made because of the discrepancy in the number of home games teams play. Some schools are able to play 35–40 of their 56 allowable games at home, while other teams, due to factors such as weather, may play only 20 home games.

This adjustment replaces the previous system of bonuses or penalties that teams received. Bonus points were awarded for beating top-75 non-conference opponents on the road and penalty points were given for losing to bottom-75 non-conference opponents at home. Bonuses and penalties were on a sliding scale, separated into groups of 25, with the top bonus for a road win against a top-25 team and the worst penalty for a home loss to a bottom-25 opponent.

== See also ==
- Bracketology
