= 2024 NIRSA National Soccer Championship =

American collegiate club soccer season

- League: NIRSA
- Sport: Soccer
- Site: Round Rock Multipurpose Complex; Round Rock, Texas
- Duration: November 21–23, 2024
- Teams: 96 total (24 per division)
- Results: Official Results

Men's Championship Division
- Score: 0–0 (a.e.t.); 6–5 (pen.)
- Champion: BYU (11th title, 12th title game)
- Runners-up: Ohio State (4th title game)
- Season MVP: Talmage Woodhouse (BYU)

Women's Championship Division
- Score: 1–0
- Champion: Cal Poly (2nd title, 3rd title game)
- Runners-up: UCLA (2nd title game)
- Season MVP: Megan Go (UCLA)

Men's Open Division
- Score: 0–0 (a.e.t.); 8–7 (pen.)
- Champion: Minnesota (1st title, 1st title game)
- Runners-up: UCLA (4th title game)
- Season MVP: Henry Elias (Minnesota)

Women's Open Division
- Score: 1–1 (a.e.t.); 4–1 (pen.)
- Champion: Colorado "Black" (2nd title, 5th title game)
- Runners-up: Missouri (2nd title game)
- Top seed: Kylie Schultz (Colorado "Black")

NIRSA national soccer championships seasons
- ← 2023 2025 →

The 2024 NIRSA national soccer championship was the 30th NIRSA National Soccer Championships, the annual national championships for United States-based, collegiate club soccer teams organized by NIRSA. It took place at the Round Rock Multipurpose Complex, in Round Rock, Texas from Thursday, November 21 to Saturday, November 23, 2024. This tournament also featured an amputee soccer division in partnership with the USA Function Fitness (USAFF).

== Overview ==
=== Men's championship ===
The finals featured a rematch of the 2019 national title game between four consecutive, reigning champions, BYU, and the 2014 national champions, Ohio State. Prior to this, in the group stage, BYU extended their current 17-game national tournament win streak with two wins, first against Nebraska 4–0 then against Boston University 2–1 to top their group. Meanwhile, Ohio State would also win their opener, a 2–1 win against Tulsa but would end up finishing second in their group after they tied reigning quarterfinalist Georgia Tech 0–0 due to Georgia Tech's superior 4–0 win against Tulsa in the group stage.

In the knockout round, BYU would first defeat pool D runner-up and reigning open champion Miami (OH) 1–0 in the round of 16 then would defeat fellow region 6 opponent and regional champion Cal Poly 3–1 in the quarterfinals to advance to their fifth consecutive final four. Meanwhile, Ohio State would first defeat pool C winners and region II tournament champions UCF then would defeat fellow regional co-champion and 2008 national champions Indiana, both by a score of 3–0, to advance to their second straight final four. In the semifinals, BYU would defeat Georgia Tech 5–0 behind 4 first half goals in a rematch of last year's quarterfinal that required extra time while Ohio State would defeat 2021 runners-up and 1995 national champions, Texas, by a score of 1–0.

In the finals, the game would be deadlocked 0–0 after halftime and regulation, meaning two 10-minute overtime periods would be required, the first time since 2018. The game would again remain scoreless following overtime, meaning penalties would have to determine a champion for the first time since 2012. In the shootout, BYU would kick first but Ohio State's goalkeeper Reese Delahanty would save the opening kick from Evan Smith with a trailing foot. Ohio State's Eric Reed would then make the first kick for Ohio State and give them a 1 goal advantage that they would hold until the fourth round. In the fourth round, Ohio State's Dawson Meldrum kicked his attempt over the bar, tying the match at 3–3. Following a conversion from BYU's Brayden Gonder and a save from BYU's keeper Chris Jenkinson, it appeared BYU had won. However, controversially, several seconds after the match referee had blown his whistle signaling full time later reversed the decision deeming Jenkinson left his line early resulting in a re-kick that Ohio State's Asher Laackman would convert. In the sixth round, Delahanty would save Isaiah Strong's attempt for BYU but Jenkinson would force another round following a save of Jacob Honner's attempt for Ohio State. Both teams converted in the seventh round then, following a make from BYU's James Dunning in the 8th round, Jenkinson would save Ohio State's 8th attempt from Youssof Mitiek to win the 2024 national title.

This would be BYU's 11th NIRSA national title and fifth-straight, breaking their own record of most consecutive national titles with four from 1996-1999 and tying UC-Santa Barbara's women's team for most consecutive titles across all four divisions. This also extended their national championship win streak to 23 games, the second longest of all time only behind their own streak of 28 from 1996-1999. BYU's Talmage Woodhouse, who scored the winning goal in the previous title game and a penalty in the fourth round of kicks in the finals, would be named tournament MVP with Chris Jenkinson being named the tournament's best goalkeeper after only conceding twice during the tournament and making the game winning save in the penalty shootout.

=== Women's championship ===
The finals consisted of the winners of the previous two tournaments, 2023 champions, UCLA, and 2022 champions, Cal Poly. Prior to this, in the group stage, both teams would top their group. UCLA would defeat UMass 5–0 in their opener followed by a 1–0 win over 2012 champions Michigan State. Meanwhile, Cal Poly would tie their opener to region II tournament champions Georgia but a 4-1 over Harvard would be enough to top their group.

In the knockout round, UCLA would defeat Northeastern 3–0 in the round of 16 then would remain tied with Texas A&M 1–1 after regulation, requiring penalties. UCLA would then prevail 3–2 in penalty kicks to advance to their second straight final four. Meanwhile, Cal Poly would defeat 8-time champions UC-Santa Barbara 2–0 in the round of 16 then would defeat 2004 co-champions Colorado 1–0 to advance to their fourth straight final four. In the semifinals, UCLA would defeat Georgia 2–0 to make their second straight finals while Cal Poly would finish their game against 2005 champions Michigan 0–0 after regulation and extra time, sending Cal Poly to their second penalty shootout in 3 games. Cal Poly would win 6–5 to set up a rematch of last year's semifinal match that UCLA won 2–0.

In the finals, the game would be deadlocked 0–0 at halftime. With roughly 10 minutes remaining, an errant touch by UCLA in their box led to a turnover with possession being won by Cal Poly's Vanessa von Sosen who passed it to Hanna Crawford whose initial shot was blocked by UCLA's Megan Go but recovered by Crawford leading to her getting fouled by UCLA's Sadie Lahey-Teare, who had the initial errant touch, leading to Cal Poly being awarded the penalty. Cal Poly's Crawford would take the kick and shoot to the left side of the goal while UCLA's goalkeeper, Lindsay Felder, would move towards the right side of the goal leading to a conversion with 9 minutes remaining, giving Cal Poly the 1–0 advantage. UCLA would be unable to equalize, giving Cal Poly the victory and securing their 2nd title in 3 years. UCLA's Megan Go would be awarded the tournament MVP, marking the first time in the 30 year history of the tournament an MVP was named for a non-champion team.

=== Men's open ===
In the finals, 2022 open champions UCLA would face 2022 championship runners-up Minnesota. Prior to this, in the group stage, both teams would top their groups with 3 wins out of 3 games. UCLA would defeat Iowa State 2–0, 2007 open runners-up Kansas 3–0, and 2000 champions Penn State 2–0, respectively, while Minnesota would defeat High Point 3–0, Sacred Heart 4–0, and 2007 champions UC-Santa Barbara 2–1.

In the knockout round, UCLA would defeat UC-Santa Barbara 1–0 in the quarterfinals then would defeat 2011 champions 2–1 to advance to their 2nd title game in 3 years and 3rd title game in 5 tournaments. Meanwhile, Minnesota would defeat 2014 national runners-up San Diego State 3–2 then 2021 open champions Boston College 3–0 to advance to their first open finals. In the finals, the game would remain deadlocked 0–0 after regulation and extra times, meaning penalties would be needed to determine an open champion for the first time since 2012. Minnesota would win 8–7 in penalties to claim their first open title. Minnesota's Henry Elias would be named tournament MVP.

=== Women's open ===
In the finals, 2011 open champions Missouri would face 2001 open champions Colorado "Black". Prior to this, in the group stage, both teams would top their groups by winning all three games. Missouri would first defeat Vermont 1–0, UC-Irvine 2–1, then Colorado School of the Mines 2–0 while Colorado "Black" won their opener 2–1 over Arkansas, then won 2–0 over Central Michigan, and finally Arizona 4–1.

In the knockout round, Missouri would defeat Oregon "Green" 3–0 in the quarterfinals then would overcome a 2–1 halftime deficit with a 4-goal second half to defeat 2016 open champions Virginia Tech 5–4 in the semifinals to advance to the finals. Meanwhile, Colorado "Black" would defeat 2018 runners-up UC-Davis 2–0 then would defeat 2010 open champions Illinois 1–0 to advance to their 5th open division championship game. In the finals, Colorado "Black" would score first and would take that lead into halftime but a second half Missouri goal would leave the game deadlocked 1–1 after regulation, meaning the championship game would go into overtime for the second consecutive year and for the third time in the last four years. However, overtime would remain goalless, meaning penalties would be required to determine a champion for the first time since 2012. In the shootout, Colorado "Black" would prevail 4–1 and claim their second open national title and become the only "B" or second team from a university to claim multiple open titles. Colorado "Black's Kylie Schultz would be named the tournament MVP.

== Format ==
The competition consisted of 96 teams partitioned into 48 men's teams and 48 women's teams. Each of these partitions were further divided into two 24-team divisions, an invite-only championship division and an open division. These divisions were finally be divided into groups, eight groups of three teams each in championship divisions and six groups of four teams each in the open divisions. All four divisions engaged in a round-robin tournament where they played each team in their group and utilized the three points for a win system to determine teams able to advance to the single elimination, knockout stage. In the championship division, the two highest ranked teams from each group advanced to their knockout stage, with the third placed team advancing to the consolation bracket. In the open division, the top team from each group as well as the two best second placed teams advanced to their knockout stage. The primary criteria for determining the best team will be points followed by the following:

Tie-breaking criteria for group play
The ranking of teams in each group was based on the following criteria in order:
1. Highest number of points
2. Winner of head-to-head competition
3. Greatest goal difference
  - Maximum ± 5 goal difference per match
4. Most goals scored
5. Most shutouts

In a tie breaking scenario involving more than 2 teams, the tiebreaker procedure would begin. If one team is identified as different and both remaining teams are still tied, the tie breaker procedure is restarted.

If a tie still remained after the first 5 criteria, the following was used to break a tie:

1. NCAA kicks from the mark
  - If there was a three-way tie, a coin-flip would be conducted. The two teams that chose the same outcome would compete in kicks from the mark between each other. The winner would compete with the last remaining team in kicks from the mark
  - If there's a four-way tie, a drawing of lots would be conducted (only could occur in open division)

Pool play games were two 40-minute halves, separated by a seven-minute halftime. Knockout stage games also consisted of two 40-minute halves. The round of 16 and quarterfinals were separated by a seven-minute halftime while the semifinals and finals had a ten-minute halftime. Knockout stage games need to declare a winner. If a knockout-stage game was tied at the end of regulation, overtime would begin. Overtime consisted of two, 10-minute periods played in their entirety. If still tied after overtime, kicks from the mark would determine the winner.

=== Seeding ===
In the championship division, teams advancing to the knockout round were placed on opposite ends of the bracket as the other team in their group. The first round matches were against 1st placed teams vs 2nd placed teams with pairings being pools A vs D, pools H vs E, pools G vs F, and pools B vs C. Following this round, the winner of the A vs D match would face the winner of the H vs E match while the winner of the G vs F match would face the winner of the B vs C match. In the consolation bracket, the first round pairings were pools A vs E, pools F vs B, pools C vs G, and pools H vs D with the winner of the A vs E match facing the winner of the F vs B match and the winner of the C vs G match facing the winner of the H vs D match.

In the open division, the bracket was numbered top to bottom from 1–8. First, the highest ranked wildcard team was placed in position 4 with the other wildcard team being placed in position 8. Then, the pool winner from the group with the wildcard team in position 4 was placed in position 5 and the pool winner from the group with the wildcard team in position 8 was placed in position 1. Finally, using the tiebreaking procedures, the highest ranked remaining group winning team was placed in position 3, the second highest was placed in position 7, the third highest placed in position 2, and the final being placed in position 6.

== Qualification and selections ==
Each of the six regions received three automatic bids for both the men's and women's championship that they awarded to its members. The final six bids were considered "at-large", and were given out by NIRSA to teams, typically based on the regional tournament results and RPI.

The 48 remaining teams participated in the open division and were selected via a lottery draw that aired on October 9, 2024, at 12pm EST. Any team with membership in a NIRSA-affiliated league or with a minimum of four games played prior to the tournament was able to enter their name into the lottery. If a selected team qualified for the championship division, an alternate took their spot.

=== Men's championship ===
Automatic qualifiers
Region	Method	Team	Appearance	Last Bid
I	Tournament; Co-champ	Rutgers	3rd	2023
I	Tournament; Co-champ	Delaware	15th	2022
I	Highest RPI of remaining teams	Tufts	6th	2021
II	Tournament; Champion	UCF	5th	2021
II	Tournament; Runner-up	Georgia Tech	5th	2023
II	Highest RPI of remaining teams	Virginia Tech	12th	2023
III	Tournament; Co-champ	Ohio State	17th	2023
III	Tournament; Co-champ	Indiana	8th	2023
III	Highest RPI of remaining teams	Michigan	19th	2023
IV	North Tournament; Champion	Saint Louis	2nd	2016
IV	South Tournament; Bid Game 1 Winner	Tulsa	1st	Never
IV	South Tournament; Bid Game 2 Winner	Texas	23rd	2023
V	Bid Game 1 Winner	Nebraska	1st	Never
V	Bid Game 2 Winner	Grand Canyon	1st	Never
V	Bid Game 3 Winner	Colorado	22nd	2023
VI	North Tournament; Champion	Oregon	9th	2023
VI	South Tournament; Co-Champion	UC-San Diego	4th	2017
VI	South Tournament; Co-Champion	Cal Poly	12th	2021

At-large bids
Region	Team	Appearance	Last Bid
I	Boston U.	1st	Never
II	North Carolina	19th	2023
III	Miami (OH)	6th	2004
III	Illinois	18th	2023
IV	Texas A&M	22nd	2022
VI	BYU	14th	2023

=== Women's championship ===
Automatic qualifiers
Region	Method	Team	Appearance	Last Bid
I	Tournament; Co-champ	Harvard	2nd	2021
I	Tournament; Co-champ	Boston College	8th	2023
I	Highest RPI of remaining teams	Northeastern	4th	2023
II	Tournament; Champion	Georgia	4th	2017
II	Tournament; Runner-up	Auburn	1st	Never
II	Highest RPI of remaining teams	North Carolina	19th	2023
III	Tournament; Co-champ	Michigan	22nd	2023
III	Tournament; Co-champ	Purdue	11th	2023
III	Highest RPI of remaining teams	Michigan State	16th	2023
IV	North Tournament; Champion	Missouri	Elected to play in open bracket	
IV	South Tournament; Bid Game 1 Winner	LSU	1st	Never
IV	South Tournament; Bid Game 2 Winner	Texas A&M	22nd	2022
V	Bid Game 1 Winner	Colorado	29th	2023
V	Bid Game 2 Winner	Colorado State	27th	2023
V	Bid Game 3 Winner	Kansas	12th	2023
VI	North Tournament; Champion	Oregon	3rd	2022
VI	South Tournament; Co-Champion	UCLA	10th	2023
VI	South Tournament; Co-Champion	UC-Santa Barbara	22nd	2022

At-large bids
Region	Team	Appearance	Last Bid
I	UMass	1st	Never
II	Virginia	14th	2023
IV	Texas	23rd	2023
IV	Wash U	6th	2022
V	Minnesota	5th	2023
VI	Cal Poly	12th	2023
VI	Arizona State	3rd	2023

=== Men's lottery selection ===
Full men's lottery selections
Region	Team	Selection Type	Bid result
I	Penn State	Automatic	Accepted
I	Sacred Heart	Automatic	Accepted
I	Brown	Automatic	Accepted
I	UConn	Automatic	Accepted
I	Babson College	Waitlist	Not accepted
I	Fairfield	Waitlist	Not accepted
I	Boston College	Waitlist	Accepted from waitlist
I	Vermont	Waitlist	Not given
I	Quinnipiac	Waitlist	Not given
I	Penn	Waitlist	Not given
I	Boston U	Waitlist	Championship
I	SUNY Brockport	Waitlist	Not given
II	Alabama	Automatic	Not accepted
II	JMU	Automatic	Accepted
II	Virginia Tech	Automatic	Championship
II	Charleston	Automatic	Accepted
II	VCU	Waitlist	Not accepted
II	High Point	Waitlist	Accepted from waitlist
II	Wake Forest	Waitlist	Not accepted
II	Tampa	Waitlist	Accepted from waitlist
II	Elon	Waitlist	Not given
III	Northeast Illinois	Automatic	Not accepted
III	Grand Valley State	Automatic	Accepted
III	Cincinnati	Automatic	Not accepted
III	Loyola Chicago	Automatic	Not accepted
III	Purdue	Waitlist	Accepted from waitlist
III	Illinois	Waitlist	Championship
III	John Carroll	Waitlist	Not given
III	UW Oshkosh	Waitlist	Not given
III	Xavier	Waitlist	Not given
III	Miami (OH)	Waitlist	Championship
IV	Baylor	Automatic	Not accepted
IV	Missouri	Automatic	Accepted
IV	Arkansas	Automatic	Accepted
IV	Kansas	Automatic	Accepted
IV	LSU	Waitlist	Accepted from waitlist
IV	Texas Tech	Waitlist	Accepted from waitlist
IV	Texas	Waitlist	Championship
V	Nebraska Omaha	Automatic	Accepted
V	Colorado	Automatic	Accepted
V	Minnesota	Automatic	Accepted
V	Iowa State	Automatic	Accepted
VI	Weber State	Automatic	Accepted
VI	USC	Automatic	Not accepted
VI	Oregon	Automatic	Championship
VI	San Diego State	Automatic	Accepted
VI	UC-Santa Barbara	Waitlist	Accepted from waitlist
VI	Cal State Fullerton	Waitlist	Not accepted
VI	Cal Poly Pomona	Waitlist	Not accepted
VI	Utah Valley	Waitlist	Not accepted
VI	UCLA	Waitlist	Accepted from waitlist
VI	Cal State San Marcos	Waitlist	Not given

Participating teams
Region	Team	Selection Type	Bid result
I	Penn State	Automatic	Accepted
I	Sacred Heart	Automatic	Accepted
I	Brown	Automatic	Accepted
I	UConn	Automatic	Accepted
I	Boston College	Waitlist	Accepted from waitlist
II	JMU	Automatic	Accepted
II	Charleston	Automatic	Accepted
II	High Point	Waitlist	Accepted from waitlist
II	Tampa	Waitlist	Accepted from waitlist
III	Grand Valley State	Automatic	Accepted
III	Purdue	Waitlist	Accepted from waitlist
IV	Missouri	Automatic	Accepted
IV	Arkansas	Automatic	Accepted
IV	Kansas	Automatic	Accepted
IV	LSU	Waitlist	Accepted from waitlist
IV	Texas Tech	Waitlist	Accepted from waitlist
V	Nebraska Omaha	Automatic	Accepted
V	Colorado	Automatic	Accepted
V	Minnesota	Automatic	Accepted
V	Iowa State	Automatic	Accepted
VI	Weber State	Automatic	Accepted
VI	San Diego State	Automatic	Accepted
VI	UC-Santa Barbara	Waitlist	Accepted from waitlist
VI	UCLA	Waitlist	Accepted from waitlist

=== Women's lottery selection ===
Full women's lottery selections
Region	Team	Selection Type	Bid result
I	Penn State	Automatic	Accepted
I	Sacred Heart	Automatic	Accepted
I	Brown	Automatic	Accepted
I	UConn	Automatic	Accepted
I	Babson College	Waitlist	Not accepted
I	Fairfield	Waitlist	Not accepted
I	Boston College	Waitlist	Accepted from waitlist
I	Vermont	Waitlist	Accepted from waitlist
I	Quinnipiac	Waitlist	Not given
I	Penn	Waitlist	Not given
I	Boston U	Waitlist	Championship
I	SUNY Brockport	Waitlist	Not given
II	Alabama	Automatic	Not accepted
II	JMU	Automatic	Accepted
II	Virginia Tech	Automatic	Championship
II	Charleston	Automatic	Accepted
II	VCU	Waitlist	Not accepted
II	High Point	Waitlist	Accepted from waitlist
II	Wake Forest	Waitlist	Not accepted
II	Tampa	Waitlist	Accepted from waitlist
II	Elon	Waitlist	Not given
III	Northeast Illinois	Automatic	Not accepted
III	Grand Valley State	Automatic	Accepted
III	Cincinnati	Automatic	Accepted
III	Loyola Chicago	Automatic	Not accepted
III	Purdue	Waitlist	Accepted from waitlist
III	Illinois	Waitlist	Championship
III	John Carroll	Waitlist	Not given
III	UW Oshkosh	Waitlist	Not given
III	Xavier	Waitlist	Not given
III	Miami (OH)	Waitlist	Championship
IV	Baylor	Automatic	Not accepted
IV	Missouri	Automatic	Accepted
IV	Arkansas	Automatic	Accepted
IV	Kansas	Automatic	Accepted
IV	LSU	Waitlist	Accepted from waitlist
IV	Texas Tech	Waitlist	Accepted from waitlist
IV	Texas	Waitlist	Championship
V	Nebraska Omaha	Automatic	Accepted
V	Colorado	Automatic	Accepted
V	Minnesota	Automatic	Accepted
V	Iowa State	Automatic	Accepted
VI	Weber State	Automatic	Accepted
VI	USC	Automatic	Not accepted
VI	Oregon	Automatic	Championship
VI	San Diego State	Automatic	Accepted
VI	UC-Santa Barbara	Waitlist	Accepted from waitlist
VI	Cal State Fullerton	Waitlist	Not given
VI	Cal Poly Pomona	Waitlist	Not given
VI	Utah Valley	Waitlist	Not given
VI	UCLA	Waitlist	Not given
VI	Cal State San Marcos	Waitlist	Not given

Participating teams
Region	Team	Selection Type	Bid result
I	Villanova	Automatic	Accepted
I	Temple	Automatic	Accepted
I	Syracuse	Automatic	Accepted
I	Vermont	Waitlist	Accepted from waitlist
II	JMU	Automatic	Accepted
II	East Carolina	Automatic	Accepted
II	Virginia Tech	Automatic	Accepted
II	UCF	Automatic	Accepted
III	Butler	Automatic	Accepted
III	Oakland	Automatic	Accepted
III	Illinois	Automatic	Accepted
III	Central Michigan	Automatic	Accepted
IV	TAMU-Galveston	Automatic	Accepted
IV	Texas Tech	Automatic	Accepted
IV	Arkansas	Automatic	Accepted
IV	Missouri	Waitlist	Accepted from waitlist
V	Iowa State	Automatic	Accepted
V	Colorado	Automatic	Accepted
V	Colorado Mines	Automatic	Accepted
V	Air Force	Automatic	Accepted
VI	UC Irvine	Automatic	Accepted
VI	UC-Davis	Automatic	Accepted
VI	Oregon	Waitlist	Accepted from waitlist
VI	Arizona	Waitlist	Accepted from waitlist

== Group stage ==
Tie-breaking criteria for group play
The ranking of teams in each group was based on the following criteria in order:
1. Highest number of points
2. Winner of head-to-head competition
3. Greatest goal difference
  - Maximum ± 5 goal difference per match
4. Most goals scored
5. Most shutouts

In a tie breaking scenario involving more than 2 teams, the tiebreaker procedure would begin as normal. If one team is identified as different and both remaining teams are still tied, the tie breaker procedure is restarted.

If a tie still remained after the first 5 criteria, the following was used to break a tie:

1. NCAA kicks from the mark
  - If there was a three-way tie, a coin-flip would be conducted. The two teams that chose the same outcome would compete in kicks from the mark between each other. The winner would compete with the last remaining team in kicks from the mark
  - If there's a four-way tie, a drawing of lots would be conducted (only could occur in open division)

=== Men's championship ===
Group A
Pos	Team	Pld	W	D	L	GF	GA	GD	Pts	Qualification
1	BYU	2	2	0	0	6	1	+5	6	Advanced to knockout stage
2	Boston U	2	0	1	1	2	3	−1	1	Advanced to knockout stage
3	Nebraska	2	0	1	1	1	5	−4	1	Consolation

Scores

8:00am CST	BYU	4–0	Nebraska	Field 3
Thu, November 21		Report		Stadium: Round Rock Multipurpose Complex; Round Rock, Texas

1:15pm CST	Nebraska	1–1	Boston U	Field 5
Thu, November 21		Report		Stadium: Round Rock Multipurpose Complex; Round Rock, Texas

6:30pm CST	Boston U	1–2	BYU	Field 4
Thu, November 21		Report		Stadium: Round Rock Multipurpose Complex; Round Rock, Texas

Group B
Pos	Team	Pld	W	D	L	GF	GA	GD	Pts	Qualification
1	Georgia Tech	2	1	1	0	4	0	+4	4	Advanced to knockout stage
2	Ohio State	2	1	1	0	2	1	+1	4	Advanced to knockout stage
3	Tulsa	2	0	0	2	1	6	−5	0	Consolation

Scores

8:00am CST	Ohio State	2–1	Tulsa	Field 4
Thu, November 21		Report		Stadium: Round Rock Multipurpose Complex; Round Rock, Texas

1:15pm CST	Tulsa	0–4	Georgia Tech	Field 6
Thu, November 21		Report		Stadium: Round Rock Multipurpose Complex; Round Rock, Texas

6:30pm CST	Georgia Tech	0–0	Ohio State	Field 3
Thu, November 21		Report		Stadium: Round Rock Multipurpose Complex; Round Rock, Texas

Group C
Pos	Team	Pld	W	D	L	GF	GA	GD	Pts	Qualification
1	UCF	2	2	0	0	4	1	+3	6	Advanced to knockout stage
2	Grand Canyon	2	1	0	1	3	4	−1	3	Advanced to knockout stage
3	UC San Diego	2	0	0	2	1	3	−2	0	Consolation

Scores

8:00am CST	UCF	1–0	UC San Diego	Field 5
Thu, November 21		Report		Stadium: Round Rock Multipurpose Complex; Round Rock, Texas

1:15pm CST	UC San Diego	1–2	Grand Canyon	Field 3
Thu, November 21		Report		Stadium: Round Rock Multipurpose Complex; Round Rock, Texas

6:30pm CST	Grand Canyon	1–3	UCF	Field 6
Thu, November 21		Report		Stadium: Round Rock Multipurpose Complex; Round Rock, Texas

Group D
Pos	Team	Pld	W	D	L	GF	GA	GD	Pts	Qualification
1	Texas	2	1	1	0	4	2	+2	4	Advanced to knockout stage
2	Miami (OH)	2	1	0	1	3	3	0	3	Advanced to knockout stage
3	Rutgers	2	0	1	1	1	3	−2	1	Consolation

Scores

8:00am CST	Rutgers	0–2	Miami (OH)	Field 6
Thu, November 21		Report		Stadium: Round Rock Multipurpose Complex; Round Rock, Texas

1:15pm CST	Miami (OH)	1–3	Texas	Field 4
Thu, November 21		Report		Stadium: Round Rock Multipurpose Complex; Round Rock, Texas

6:30pm CST	Texas	1–1	Rutgers	Field 5
Thu, November 21		Report		Stadium: Round Rock Multipurpose Complex; Round Rock, Texas

Group E
Pos	Team	Pld	W	D	L	GF	GA	GD	Pts	Qualification
1	Colorado	2	1	0	1	2	1	+1	3	Advanced to knockout stage
2	North Carolina	2	1	0	1	1	1	0	3	Advanced to knockout stage
3	Michigan	2	1	0	1	1	2	−1	3	Consolation

Scores

9:45am CST	Colorado	0–1	North Carolina	Field 3
Thu, November 21		Report		Stadium: Round Rock Multipurpose Complex; Round Rock, Texas

3:00pm CST	North Carolina	0–1	Michigan	Field 5
Thu, November 21		Report		Stadium: Round Rock Multipurpose Complex; Round Rock, Texas

8:15pm CST	Michigan	0–2	Colorado	Field 4
Thu, November 21		Report		Stadium: Round Rock Multipurpose Complex; Round Rock, Texas

Group F
Pos	Team	Pld	W	D	L	GF	GA	GD	Pts	Qualification
1	Indiana	2	1	1	0	4	3	+1	4	Advanced to knockout stage
2	Oregon	2	1	0	1	5	1	+4	3	Advanced to knockout stage
3	Texas A&M	2	0	1	1	3	8	−5	1	Consolation

Scores

9:45am CST	Oregon	5–0	Texas A&M	Field 4
Thu, November 21		Report		Stadium: Round Rock Multipurpose Complex; Round Rock, Texas

3:00pm CST	Texas A&M	3–3	Indiana	Field 6
Thu, November 21		Report		Stadium: Round Rock Multipurpose Complex; Round Rock, Texas

8:15pm CST	Indiana	1–0	Oregon	Field 3
Thu, November 21		Report		Stadium: Round Rock Multipurpose Complex; Round Rock, Texas

Group G
Pos	Team	Pld	W	D	L	GF	GA	GD	Pts	Qualification
1	Tufts	2	1	1	0	2	1	+1	4	Advanced to knockout stage
2	Virginia Tech	2	0	2	0	2	2	0	2	Advanced to knockout stage
3	St Louis	2	0	1	1	1	2	−1	1	Consolation

Scores

9:45am CST	St Louis	0–1	Tufts	Field 5
Thu, November 21		Report		Stadium: Round Rock Multipurpose Complex; Round Rock, Texas

3:00pm CST	Tufts	1–1	Virginia Tech	Field 3
Thu, November 21		Report		Stadium: Round Rock Multipurpose Complex; Round Rock, Texas

8:15pm CST	Virginia Tech	1–1	St Louis	Field 6
Thu, November 21		Report		Stadium: Round Rock Multipurpose Complex; Round Rock, Texas

Group H
Pos	Team	Pld	W	D	L	GF	GA	GD	Pts	Qualification
1	Cal Poly	2	2	0	0	4	1	+3	6	Advanced to knockout stage
2	Illinois	2	1	0	1	3	3	0	3	Advanced to knockout stage
3	Delaware	2	0	0	2	1	4	−3	0	Consolation

Scores

9:45am CST	Delaware	1–2	Illinois	Field 6
Thu, November 21		Report		Stadium: Round Rock Multipurpose Complex; Round Rock, Texas

3:00pm CST	Illinois	1–2	Cal Poly	Field 4
Thu, November 21		Report		Stadium: Round Rock Multipurpose Complex; Round Rock, Texas

8:15pm CST	Cal Poly	2–0	Delaware	Field 5
Thu, November 21		Report		Stadium: Round Rock Multipurpose Complex; Round Rock, Texas

=== Women's championship ===
Group A
Pos	Team	Pld	W	D	L	GF	GA	GD	Pts	Qualification
1	UCLA	2	2	0	0	6	0	+6	6	Advanced to knockout stage
2	Michigan State	2	1	0	1	6	1	+4	3	Advanced to knockout stage
3	UMass	2	0	0	2	0	11	−10	0	Consolation

Scores

8:00am CST	UCLA	5–0	UMass	Field 7
Thu, November 21		Report		Stadium: Round Rock Multipurpose Complex; Round Rock, Texas

1:15pm CST	UMass	0–6	Michigan State	Field 9
Thu, November 21		Report		Stadium: Round Rock Multipurpose Complex; Round Rock, Texas

6:30pm CST	Michigan State	0–1	UCLA	Field 8
Thu, November 21		Report		Stadium: Round Rock Multipurpose Complex; Round Rock, Texas

Group B
Pos	Team	Pld	W	D	L	GF	GA	GD	Pts	Qualification
1	North Carolina	2	2	0	0	4	2	+2	6	Advanced to knockout stage
2	UC-Santa Barbara	2	0	1	1	1	2	−1	1	Advanced to knockout stage
3	Boston College	2	0	1	1	1	2	−1	1	Consolation

Scores

8:00am CST	Boston College	0–0	UC-Santa Barbara	Field 8
Thu, November 21		Report		Stadium: Round Rock Multipurpose Complex; Round Rock, Texas

1:15pm CST	UC-Santa Barbara	1–2	North Carolina	Field 10
Thu, November 21		Report		Stadium: Round Rock Multipurpose Complex; Round Rock, Texas

6:30pm CST	North Carolina	2–1	Boston College	Field 7
Thu, November 21		Report		Stadium: Round Rock Multipurpose Complex; Round Rock, Texas

12:30pm CST	UC-Santa Barbara	Tiebreaker (4–3 p)	Boston College	Field 2
Fri, November 22		Report		Stadium: Round Rock Multipurpose Complex; Round Rock, Texas
	Penalties
	Kimi Rubino (penalty missed); Alexis Muche (penalty missed); Heather Mahoney (penalty scored); Katherine Montoya (penalty missed); Sydney Koleno (penalty scored); Elizabeth Powell (penalty scored); Talia Bertino (penalty scored)		(penalty missed) Jada Tuffin; (penalty scored) Josephine Edgar; (penalty missed) Camille Longabardi; (penalty scored) Gracie Couden; (penalty missed) Kylie Skiba; (penalty scored) Sabrina Walker; (penalty missed) Avery Manni
Note: Shootout Video

Group C
Pos	Team	Pld	W	D	L	GF	GA	GD	Pts	Qualification
1	Cal Poly	2	1	1	0	5	2	+3	4	Advanced to knockout stage
2	Georgia	2	0	2	0	2	2	0	2	Advanced to knockout stage
3	Harvard	2	0	1	1	2	5	−3	1	Consolation

Scores

8:00am CST	Georgia	1–1	Cal Poly	Field 9
Thu, November 21		Report		Stadium: Round Rock Multipurpose Complex; Round Rock, Texas

1:15pm CST	Cal Poly	4–1	Harvard	Field 7
Thu, November 21		Report		Stadium: Round Rock Multipurpose Complex; Round Rock, Texas

6:30pm CST	Harvard	1–1	Georgia	Field 10
Thu, November 21		Report		Stadium: Round Rock Multipurpose Complex; Round Rock, Texas

Group D
Pos	Team	Pld	W	D	L	GF	GA	GD	Pts	Qualification
1	Michigan	2	1	1	0	8	2	+5	4	Advanced to knockout stage
2	Northeastern	2	1	1	0	3	2	+1	4	Advanced to knockout stage
3	Wash U	2	0	0	2	2	9	−6	0	Consolation

Scores

8:00am CST	Michigan	7–1	Wash U	Field 10
Thu, November 21		Report		Stadium: Round Rock Multipurpose Complex; Round Rock, Texas

1:15pm CST	Wash U	1–2	Northeastern	Field 8
Thu, November 21		Report		Stadium: Round Rock Multipurpose Complex; Round Rock, Texas

6:30pm CST	Northeastern	1–1	Michigan	Field 9
Thu, November 21		Report		Stadium: Round Rock Multipurpose Complex; Round Rock, Texas

Group E
Pos	Team	Pld	W	D	L	GF	GA	GD	Pts	Qualification
1	Arizona State	2	2	0	0	5	2	+3	6	Advanced to knockout stage
2	LSU	2	1	0	1	4	4	0	3	Advanced to knockout stage
3	Colorado State	2	0	0	2	0	3	−3	0	Consolation

Scores

9:45am CST	LSU	2–4	Arizona State	Field 7
Thu, November 21		Report		Stadium: Round Rock Multipurpose Complex; Round Rock, Texas

3:00pm CST	Arizona State	1–0	Colorado State	Field 9
Thu, November 21		Report		Stadium: Round Rock Multipurpose Complex; Round Rock, Texas

8:15pm CST	Colorado State	0–2	LSU	Field 8
Thu, November 21		Report		Stadium: Round Rock Multipurpose Complex; Round Rock, Texas

Group F
Pos	Team	Pld	W	D	L	GF	GA	GD	Pts	Qualification
1	Colorado	2	2	0	0	3	0	+3	6	Advanced to knockout stage
2	Auburn	2	1	0	1	2	2	0	3	Advanced to knockout stage
3	Texas	2	0	0	2	0	3	−3	0	Consolation

Scores

9:45am CST	Colorado	1–0	Texas	Field 8
Thu, November 21		Report		Stadium: Round Rock Multipurpose Complex; Round Rock, Texas

3:00pm CST	Texas	0–2	Auburn	Field 10
Thu, November 21		Report		Stadium: Round Rock Multipurpose Complex; Round Rock, Texas

8:15pm CST	Auburn	0–2	Colorado	Field 7
Thu, November 21		Report		Stadium: Round Rock Multipurpose Complex; Round Rock, Texas

Group G
Pos	Team	Pld	W	D	L	GF	GA	GD	Pts	Qualification
1	Kansas	2	2	0	0	6	3	+3	6	Advanced to knockout stage
2	Oregon	2	1	0	1	3	2	+1	3	Advanced to knockout stage
3	Virginia	2	0	0	2	2	6	−4	0	Consolation

Scores

9:45am CST	Oregon	2–0	Virginia	Field 9
Thu, November 21		Report		Stadium: Round Rock Multipurpose Complex; Round Rock, Texas

3:00pm CST	Virginia	2–4	Kansas	Field 7
Thu, November 21		Report		Stadium: Round Rock Multipurpose Complex; Round Rock, Texas

8:15pm CST	Kansas	2–1	Oregon	Field 10
Thu, November 21		Report		Stadium: Round Rock Multipurpose Complex; Round Rock, Texas

Group H
Pos	Team	Pld	W	D	L	GF	GA	GD	Pts	Qualification
1	Texas A&M	2	0	2	0	3	3	0	2	Advanced to knockout stage
2	Minnesota	2	0	2	0	2	2	0	2	Advanced to knockout stage
3	Purdue	2	0	2	0	1	1	0	2	Consolation

Scores

9:45am CST	Purdue	0–0	Minnesota	Field 10
Thu, November 21		Report		Stadium: Round Rock Multipurpose Complex; Round Rock, Texas

3:00pm CST	Minnesota	2–2	Texas A&M	Field 8
Thu, November 21		Report		Stadium: Round Rock Multipurpose Complex; Round Rock, Texas

8:15pm CST	Texas A&M	1–1	Purdue	Field 9
Thu, November 21		Report		Stadium: Round Rock Multipurpose Complex; Round Rock, Texas

=== Men's open ===
Group A
Pos	Team	Pld	W	D	L	GF	GA	GD	Pts	Qualification
1	UCLA	1	3	0	0	7	0	+7	9	Advanced to knockout stage
2	Penn State	2	2	0	1	7	3	+4	6	
3	Kansas	3	1	0	2	2	6	−4	3	
4	Iowa State	4	0	0	3	0	7	−7	0	

Scores

8:00am CST	Penn State	3–1	Kansas	Field OSP1
Thu, November 21		Report		Stadium: Round Rock Multipurpose Complex; Round Rock, Texas

8:00am CST	UCLA	2–0	Iowa State	Field OSP2
Thu, November 21		Report		Stadium: Round Rock Multipurpose Complex; Round Rock, Texas

3:00pm CST	Iowa State	0–4	Penn State	Field OSP3
Thu, November 21		Report		Stadium: Round Rock Multipurpose Complex; Round Rock, Texas

3:00pm CST	Kansas	0–3	UCLA	Field OSP4
Thu, November 21		Report		Stadium: Round Rock Multipurpose Complex; Round Rock, Texas

8:00am CST	Penn State	0–2	UCLA	Field 8
Fri, November 22		Report		Stadium: Round Rock Multipurpose Complex; Round Rock, Texas

8:00am CST	Iowa State	0–1	Kansas	Field 2
Fri, November 22		Report		Stadium: Round Rock Multipurpose Complex; Round Rock, Texas
Note: Game Video

Group B
Pos	Team	Pld	W	D	L	GF	GA	GD	Pts	Qualification
1	Minnesota	1	3	0	0	9	1	+8	9	Advanced to knockout stage
2	UC-Santa Barbara	2	2	0	1	12	3	+9	6	Advanced to knockout stage
3	High Point	3	1	0	2	4	8	−4	3	
4	Sacred Heart	4	0	0	3	2	15	−13	0	

Scores

8:00am CST	High Point	0–3	Minnesota	Field OSP3
Thu, November 21		Report		Stadium: Round Rock Multipurpose Complex; Round Rock, Texas

8:00am CST	Sacred Heart	1–7	UC-Santa Barbara	Field OSP4
Thu, November 21		Report		Stadium: Round Rock Multipurpose Complex; Round Rock, Texas

3:00pm CST	UC-Santa Barbara	4–0	High Point	Field OSP5
Thu, November 21		Report		Stadium: Round Rock Multipurpose Complex; Round Rock, Texas

3:00pm CST	Minnesota	4–0	Sacred Heart	Field 2
Thu, November 21		Report		Stadium: Round Rock Multipurpose Complex; Round Rock, Texas
Note: Game Video

8:00am CST	High Point	4–1	Sacred Heart	Field 4
Fri, November 22		Report		Stadium: Round Rock Multipurpose Complex; Round Rock, Texas

8:00am CST	UC-Santa Barbara	1–2	Minnesota	Field 5
Fri, November 22		Report		Stadium: Round Rock Multipurpose Complex; Round Rock, Texas

Group C
Pos	Team	Pld	W	D	L	GF	GA	GD	Pts	Qualification
1	San Diego State	1	2	1	0	4	1	+3	7	Advanced to knockout stage
2	Brown	2	2	0	1	2	1	+1	6	
3	JMU	3	1	1	1	3	2	+1	4	
4	Texas Tech	4	0	0	3	0	5	−5	0	

Scores

8:00am CST	Texas Tech	0–2	San Diego State	Field OSP5
Thu, November 21		Report		Stadium: Round Rock Multipurpose Complex; Round Rock, Texas

8:00am CST	JMU	0–1	Brown	Field 2
Thu, November 21		Report		Stadium: Round Rock Multipurpose Complex; Round Rock, Texas

3:00pm CST	Brown	1–0	Texas Tech	Field OSP1
Thu, November 21		Report		Stadium: Round Rock Multipurpose Complex; Round Rock, Texas

3:00pm CST	San Diego State	1–1	JMU	Field OSP2
Thu, November 21		Report		Stadium: Round Rock Multipurpose Complex; Round Rock, Texas

8:00am CST	Texas Tech	0–2	JMU	Field 6
Fri, November 22		Report		Stadium: Round Rock Multipurpose Complex; Round Rock, Texas

8:00am CST	Brown	0–1	San Diego State	Field 7
Fri, November 22		Report		Stadium: Round Rock Multipurpose Complex; Round Rock, Texas

Group D
Pos	Team	Pld	W	D	L	GF	GA	GD	Pts	Qualification
1	Missouri	1	3	0	0	9	3	+6	9	Advanced to knockout stage
2	UConn	2	2	0	1	11	7	+4	6	
3	Grand Valley	3	1	0	2	5	5	0	3	
4	Tampa	4	0	0	3	2	12	−10	0	

Scores

9:45am CST	Missouri	4–3	UConn	Field OSP1
Thu, November 21		Report		Stadium: Round Rock Multipurpose Complex; Round Rock, Texas

9:45am CST	Grand Valley	4–0	Tampa	Field OSP2
Thu, November 21		Report		Stadium: Round Rock Multipurpose Complex; Round Rock, Texas

4:45pm CST	Tampa	0–3	Missouri	Field OSP3
Thu, November 21		Report		Stadium: Round Rock Multipurpose Complex; Round Rock, Texas

4:45pm CST	UConn	3–1	Grand Valley	Field OSP4
Thu, November 21		Report		Stadium: Round Rock Multipurpose Complex; Round Rock, Texas

8:00am CST	Missouri	2–0	Grand Valley	Field OSP5
Fri, November 22		Report		Stadium: Round Rock Multipurpose Complex; Round Rock, Texas

8:00am CST	Tampa	2–5	UConn	Field 3
Fri, November 22		Report		Stadium: Round Rock Multipurpose Complex; Round Rock, Texas

Group E
Pos	Team	Pld	W	D	L	GF	GA	GD	Pts	Qualification
1	LSU	1	3	0	0	9	2	+7	9	Advanced to knockout stage
2	Boston College	2	2	0	1	11	5	+6	6	Advanced to knockout stage
3	Nebraska Omaha	3	0	1	2	3	8	−5	1	
4	Charleston	4	0	1	2	5	13	−8	1	

Scores

9:45am CST	Nebraska Omaha	2–2	Charleston	Field OSP3
Thu, November 21		Report		Stadium: Round Rock Multipurpose Complex; Round Rock, Texas

9:45am CST	LSU	2–1	Boston College	Field OSP4
Thu, November 21		Report		Stadium: Round Rock Multipurpose Complex; Round Rock, Texas

4:45pm CST	Boston College	3–1	Nebraska Omaha	Field OSP5
Thu, November 21		Report		Stadium: Round Rock Multipurpose Complex; Round Rock, Texas

4:45pm CST	Charleston	1–4	LSU	Field 2
Thu, November 21		Report		Stadium: Round Rock Multipurpose Complex; Round Rock, Texas
Note: Game Video

8:00am CST	Nebraska Omaha	0–3	LSU	Field OSP1
Fri, November 22		Report		Stadium: Round Rock Multipurpose Complex; Round Rock, Texas

8:00am CST	Boston College	7–2	Charleston	Field OSP2
Fri, November 22		Report		Stadium: Round Rock Multipurpose Complex; Round Rock, Texas

Group F
Pos	Team	Pld	W	D	L	GF	GA	GD	Pts	Qualification
1	Weber State	1	2	1	0	9	3	+6	7	Advanced to knockout stage
2	Purdue	2	1	1	1	4	4	0	4	
3	Arkansas	3	0	3	0	2	2	0	3	
4	Colorado "Black"	4	0	1	2	0	6	−6	1	

Scores

9:45am CST	Weber State	3–2	Purdue	Field OSP5
Thu, November 21		Report		Stadium: Round Rock Multipurpose Complex; Round Rock, Texas

9:45am CST	Colorado "Black"	0–0	Arkansas	Field 2
Thu, November 21		Report		Stadium: Round Rock Multipurpose Complex; Round Rock, Texas
Note: Game stream

4:45pm CST	Arkansas	1–1	Weber State	Field OSP1
Thu, November 21		Report		Stadium: Round Rock Multipurpose Complex; Round Rock, Texas

4:45pm CST	Purdue	1–0	Colorado "Black"	Field OSP2
Thu, November 21		Report		Stadium: Round Rock Multipurpose Complex; Round Rock, Texas

8:00am CST	Weber State	5–0	Colorado "Black"	Field OSP3
Fri, November 22		Report		Stadium: Round Rock Multipurpose Complex; Round Rock, Texas

8:00am CST	Arkansas	1–1	Purdue	Field OSP4
Fri, November 22		Report		Stadium: Round Rock Multipurpose Complex; Round Rock, Texas

=== Women's open ===
Group A
Pos	Team	Pld	W	D	L	GF	GA	GD	Pts	Qualification
1	Missouri	1	3	0	0	5	1	+4	9	Advanced to knockout stage
2	UC Irvine	2	1	1	1	3	3	0	4	
3	Colorado Mines	3	1	0	2	1	3	−2	3	
4	Vermont	4	0	1	2	1	3	−2	1	

Scores

11:30am CST	Vermont	0–1	Missouri	Field OSP1
Thu, November 21		Report		Stadium: Round Rock Multipurpose Complex; Round Rock, Texas

11:30am CST	UC Irvine	1–0	Colorado Mines	Field OSP2
Thu, November 21		Report		Stadium: Round Rock Multipurpose Complex; Round Rock, Texas

6:30pm CST	Colorado Mines	1–0	Vermont	Field OSP3
Thu, November 21		Report		Stadium: Round Rock Multipurpose Complex; Round Rock, Texas

6:30pm CST	Missouri	2–1	UC Irvine	Field OSP4
Thu, November 21		Report		Stadium: Round Rock Multipurpose Complex; Round Rock, Texas

10:00am CST	Vermont	1–1	UC Irvine	Field OSP5
Fri, November 22		Report		Stadium: Round Rock Multipurpose Complex; Round Rock, Texas

10:00am CST	Colorado Mines	0–2	Missouri	Field 2
Fri, November 22		Report		Stadium: Round Rock Multipurpose Complex; Round Rock, Texas
Note: Game Video

Group B
Pos	Team	Pld	W	D	L	GF	GA	GD	Pts	Qualification
1	UC Davis	1	3	0	0	4	0	+4	9	Advanced to knockout stage
2	JMU	2	2	0	1	4	2	+2	6	Advanced to knockout stage
3	Air Force	3	1	0	2	3	6	−3	3	
4	Villanova	4	0	0	3	3	6	−3	0	

Scores

11:30am CST	JMU	2–0	Air Force	Field OSP3
Thu, November 21		Report		Stadium: Round Rock Multipurpose Complex; Round Rock, Texas

11:30am CST	Villanova	0–1	UC Davis	Field OSP4
Thu, November 21		Report		Stadium: Round Rock Multipurpose Complex; Round Rock, Texas

6:30pm CST	UC Davis	1–0	JMU	Field OSP5
Thu, November 21		Report		Stadium: Round Rock Multipurpose Complex; Round Rock, Texas

6:30pm CST	Air Force	3–2	Villanova	Field 2
Thu, November 21		Report		Stadium: Round Rock Multipurpose Complex; Round Rock, Texas
Note: Game Video

10:00am CST	JMU	2–1	Villanova	Field OSP1
Fri, November 22		Report		Stadium: Round Rock Multipurpose Complex; Round Rock, Texas

10:00am CST	UC Davis	2–0	Air Force	Field OSP2
Fri, November 22		Report		Stadium: Round Rock Multipurpose Complex; Round Rock, Texas

Group C
Pos	Team	Pld	W	D	L	GF	GA	GD	Pts	Qualification
1	East Carolina	1	2	0	1	6	2	+4	6	Advanced to knockout stage
2	Oregon "Green"	2	2	0	1	3	2	+1	6	Advanced to knockout stage
3	Temple	3	1	0	2	1	3	−2	3	
4	Butler	4	1	0	2	2	5	−3	3	

Scores

11:30am CST	Butler	2–0	Oregon "Green"	Field OSP5
Thu, November 21		Report		Stadium: Round Rock Multipurpose Complex; Round Rock, Texas

11:30am CST	East Carolina	2–0	Temple	Field 2
Thu, November 21		Report		Stadium: Round Rock Multipurpose Complex; Round Rock, Texas
Note: Game Video

6:30pm CST	Temple	1–0	Butler	Field OSP1
Thu, November 21		Report		Stadium: Round Rock Multipurpose Complex; Round Rock, Texas

6:30pm CST	Oregon "Green"	2–0	East Carolina	Field OSP2
Thu, November 21		Report		Stadium: Round Rock Multipurpose Complex; Round Rock, Texas

10:00am CST	Butler	0–4	East Carolina	Field OSP3
Fri, November 22		Report		Stadium: Round Rock Multipurpose Complex; Round Rock, Texas

10:00am CST	Temple	0–1	Oregon "Green"	Field OSP4
Fri, November 22		Report		Stadium: Round Rock Multipurpose Complex; Round Rock, Texas

Group D
Pos	Team	Pld	W	D	L	GF	GA	GD	Pts	Qualification
1	Virginia Tech	1	2	1	0	18	1	+17	7	Advanced to knockout stage
2	Syracuse	2	1	2	0	13	0	+13	5	
3	Oakland	3	1	1	1	7	2	+5	4	
4	TAMU Galveston	4	0	0	3	0	35	−35	0	

Scores

1:15pm CST	TAMU Galveston	0–13	Syracuse	Field OSP1
Thu, November 21		Report		Stadium: Round Rock Multipurpose Complex; Round Rock, Texas

1:15pm CST	Oakland	1–2	Virginia Tech	Field OSP2
Thu, November 21		Report		Stadium: Round Rock Multipurpose Complex; Round Rock, Texas

8:15pm CST	Virginia Tech	16–0	TAMU Galveston	Field OSP3
Thu, November 21		Report		Stadium: Round Rock Multipurpose Complex; Round Rock, Texas

8:15pm CST	Syracuse	0–0	Oakland	Field OSP4
Thu, November 21		Report		Stadium: Round Rock Multipurpose Complex; Round Rock, Texas

1:30pm CST	TAMU Galveston	0–6	Oakland	Field OSP3
Fri, November 22		Report		Stadium: Round Rock Multipurpose Complex; Round Rock, Texas

1:30pm CST	Virginia Tech	0–0	Syracuse	Field 2
Fri, November 22		Report		Stadium: Round Rock Multipurpose Complex; Round Rock, Texas
Note: Game Video

Group E
Pos	Team	Pld	W	D	L	GF	GA	GD	Pts	Qualification
1	Illinois	1	3	0	0	9	1	+8	9	Advanced to knockout stage
2	Iowa State	2	1	1	1	5	5	0	4	
3	Texas Tech	3	1	1	1	6	9	−3	4	
4	UCF	4	0	0	3	2	7	−5	0	

Scores

1:15pm CST	Iowa State	2–1	UCF	Field OSP3
Thu, November 21		Report		Stadium: Round Rock Multipurpose Complex; Round Rock, Texas

1:15pm CST	Texas Tech	0–6	Illinois	Field OSP4
Thu, November 21		Report		Stadium: Round Rock Multipurpose Complex; Round Rock, Texas

8:15pm CST	Illinois	2–1	Iowa State	Field OSP5
Thu, November 21		Report		Stadium: Round Rock Multipurpose Complex; Round Rock, Texas

8:15pm CST	UCF	1–4	Texas Tech	Field 2
Thu, November 21		Report		Stadium: Round Rock Multipurpose Complex; Round Rock, Texas
Note: Game Video

1:30pm CST	Iowa State	2–2	Texas Tech	Field OSP4
Fri, November 22		Report		Stadium: Round Rock Multipurpose Complex; Round Rock, Texas

1:30pm CST	Illinois	1–0	UCF	Field OSP5
Fri, November 22		Report		Stadium: Round Rock Multipurpose Complex; Round Rock, Texas

Group F
Pos	Team	Pld	W	D	L	GF	GA	GD	Pts	Qualification
1	Colorado "Black"	1	3	0	0	8	2	+6	9	Advanced to knockout stage
2	Arkansas	2	2	0	1	5	4	+1	6	
3	Arizona	3	1	0	2	4	5	−1	3	
4	Central Michigan	4	0	0	3	2	8	−6	0	

Scores

1:15pm CST	Arizona	3–0	Central Michigan	Field OSP5
Thu, November 21		Report		Stadium: Round Rock Multipurpose Complex; Round Rock, Texas

1:15pm CST	Colorado "Black"	2–1	Arkansas	Field 2
Thu, November 21		Report		Stadium: Round Rock Multipurpose Complex; Round Rock, Texas
Note: Game Video

8:15pm CST	Arkansas	1–0	Arizona	Field OSP1
Thu, November 21		Report		Stadium: Round Rock Multipurpose Complex; Round Rock, Texas

8:15pm CST	Central Michigan	0–2	Colorado "Black"	Field OSP2
Thu, November 21		Report		Stadium: Round Rock Multipurpose Complex; Round Rock, Texas

1:30pm CST	Arizona	1–4	Colorado "Black"	Field OSP1
Fri, November 22		Report		Stadium: Round Rock Multipurpose Complex; Round Rock, Texas

1:30pm CST	Arkansas	3–2	Central Michigan	Field OSP2
Fri, November 22		Report		Stadium: Round Rock Multipurpose Complex; Round Rock, Texas

== Tournament bracket ==
=== Men's championship ===
Sweet 16
Fri • 10:00am • Field 3
BYU	1
Miami (OH)	0
Fri • 10:00am • Field 4
Cal Poly	1
North Carolina	0
Fri • 10:00am • Field 5
Tufts (pen.)	2 (8)
Oregon	2 (7)
Fri • 10:00am • Field 6
Georgia Tech (pen.)	1 (3)
Grand Canyon	1 (2)
Fri • 1:00pm • Field 3
UCF	0
Ohio State	3
Fri • 1:00pm • Field 4
Indiana (pen.)	1 (4)
Virginia Tech	1 (3)
Fri • 1:00pm • Field 5
Colorado (pen.)	0 (4)
Illinois	0 (3)
Fri • 1:00pm • Field 6
Texas	3
Boston U	1

Quarterfinals
Fri • 5:00pm • Field 5
BYU	3
Cal Poly	1
Fri • 5:00pm • Field 6
Tufts	0
Georgia Tech	2
Fri • 7:00pm • Field 5
Ohio State	3
Indiana	0
Fri • 7:00pm • Field 6
Colorado	1
Texas	2

Semifinals
Sat • 10:00am • Field 5
BYU	5
Georgia Tech	0
Sat • 10:00am • Field 6
Ohio State	1
Texas	0

Final
Sat • 5:00pm • Field 2
BYU	0 (6)
Ohio State	0 (5)

==== Men's consolation ====
Quarterfinals
Fri • 3:00pm • Field 7
Nebraska	4
Michigan	7
Fri • 3:00pm • Field 8
Texas A&M (pen.)	2 (4)
Tulsa	2 (3)
Fri • 5:00pm • Field 7
UC-San Diego	0
Saint Louis	1
Fri • 5:00pm • Field 8
Delaware	0
Rutgers	4

Semifinals
Sat • 8:00am • Field 7
Michigan (pen.)	2 (6)
Texas A&M	2 (5)
Sat • 8:00am • Field 8
Saint Louis	1
Rutgers	3

Final
Sat • 1:00pm • Field 8
Michigan	2 (4)
Rutgers (pen.)	2 (5)

=== Women's championship ===
Sweet 16
Fri • 10:00am • Field 7
UCLA	3
Northeastern	0
Fri • 10:00am • Field 8
Texas A&M	3
LSU	0
Fri • 10:00am • Field 9
Kansas	2
Auburn	0
Fri • 10:00am • Field 10
North Carolina	1
Georgia	2
Fri • 1:00pm • Field 7
Cal Poly	2
UC-Santa Barbara	0
Fri • 1:00pm • Field 8
Colorado (a.e.t)	3
Oregon	2
Fri • 1:00pm • Field 9
Arizona State (a.e.t)	3
Minnesota	1
Fri • 1:00pm • Field 10
Michigan (pen.)	1 (5)
Michigan State	1 (4)

Quarterfinals
Fri • 5:00pm • Field 3
UCLA (pen.)	1 (3)
Texas A&M	1 (2)
Fri • 5:00pm • Field 4
Kansas	0
Georgia	1
Fri • 7:00pm • Field 3
Cal Poly	1
Colorado	0
Fri • 7:00pm • Field 4
Arizona State	0
Michigan	2

Semifinals
Sat • 10:00am • Field 3
UCLA	2
Georgia	0
Sat • 10:00am • Field 4
Cal Poly (pen.)	0 (6)
Michigan	0 (5)

Final
Sat • 3:00pm • Field 2
UCLA	0
Cal Poly	1

==== Women's consolation ====
Quarterfinals
Fri • 3:00pm • Field 9
UMass	2
Colorado State	0
Fri • 3:00pm • Field 10
Texas	0
Boston College	1
Fri • 5:00pm • Field 9
Harvard	2
Virginia	0
Fri • 5:00pm • Field 10
Purdue (pen.)	1 (3)
Wash U	1 (1)

Semifinals
Sat • 8:00am • Field 9
UMass	0
Boston College	1
Sat • 8:00am • Field 10
Harvard	3
Purdue	2

Final
Sat • 1:00pm • Field 9
Boston College	1 (3)
Harvard (pen.)	1 (4)

=== Men's open ===
Quarterfinals
Fri • 3:00pm • Field 3
LSU	0
Weber State	2
Fri • 3:00pm • Field 4
UCLA	1
UC-Santa Barbara	0
Fri • 3:00pm • Field 5
Minnesota	3
San Diego State	2
Fri • 3:00pm • Field 6
Missouri	0
Boston College	1

Semifinals
Sat • 8:00am • Field 5
Weber State	1
UCLA	2
Sat • 8:00am • Field 6
Minnesota	3
Boston College	0

Final
Sat • 1:00pm • Field 6
UCLA	0 (7)
Minnesota (pen.)	0 (8)

=== Women's open ===
Quarterfinals
Fri • 7:00pm • Field 7
UC Davis	0
Colorado "Black"	2
Fri • 7:00pm • Field 8
Illinois	1
East Carolina	0
Fri • 7:00pm • Field 9
Oregon "Green"	0
Missouri	3
Fri • 7:00pm • Field 10
Virginia Tech	3
JMU	0

Semifinals
Sat • 8:00am • Field 3
Colorado "Black"	1
Illinois	0
Sat • 8:00am • Field 4
Missouri	5
Virginia Tech	4

Final
Sat • 1:00pm • Field 4
Colorado "Black" (pen.)	1 (4)
Missouri	1 (1)

== All-tournament teams ==
Key
MVP
Best goalkeeper

=== Men's championship ===
#	Name	Team
9	Talmage Woodhouse	BYU
00	Chris Jenkinson	BYU
21	Zachary Rollins	Ohio State
14	Oskar Bringle	Georgia Tech
10	Max Anders	Oregon
27	Gabe Tangeman	Ohio State
2	Dylan Rodriguez	BYU
24	Christian Torres	Texas
19	Aryan Sunder	Texas
14	Andrew Juarez	Ohio State
14	Alex Fankhauser	BYU
20	Aaron Jolley	BYU

=== Women's championship ===
#	Name	Team
2	Megan Go	UCLA
1	Paige Rightmire	Cal Poly
17	Nina Toracca	Cal Poly
21	Nicole Krockenberger	UCLA
9	Mia Kim	UCLA
24	Lily Pennington	Cal Poly
21	Janey Kauppien	Georgia
12	Hanna Crawford	Cal Poly
3	Gina Czochara	Michigan
21	Emily Barkes	Michigan
22	Ella Economos	Cal Poly
17	Brooklyn Horst	UCLA
Sportsmanship Award
University of Michigan

=== Men's open ===
#	Name	Team
11	Henry Elias	Minnesota
1	Ryan Everhart	Minnesota
13	Travis Caplan	UCLA
1	Sam Friedman	UCLA
15	Rockwood Foster	UCLA
19	Noah Walker	UCLA
14	James Patten	Weber State
11	Jacob Agazzi	LSU
4	Ethan Cotton	San Diego State
8	Corbin Bodily	Weber State
11	Christian Martins	Boston College
14	Antonio Lee	Minnesota
Sportsmanship Award
Weber State

=== Women's open ===
#	Name	Team
1	Kylie Schultz	Colorado "Black"
0	Emily Lewis	Colorado "Black"
22	Morgan Taylor	Colorado "Black"
20	Marley Naughton	Colorado "Black"
19	Maisun Kobal	Colorado "Black"
7	Lauren Peyton	Virginia Tech
14	Kelly Dean	Missouri
2	Juju Arensdorf	Colorado "Black"
2	Hanah Crowder	Illinois
6	Caroline Tulk	Virginia Tech
5	Caroline Knolhoff	Missouri
13	Ashley Borron	Missouri
