= 2025 NIRSA National Soccer Championship =

American collegiate club soccer season

- League: NIRSA
- Sport: Soccer
- Site: Scheels Overland Park Soccer Complex; Overland Park, Kansas
- Duration: November 20–22, 2025
- Teams: 96 total (24 per division)
- Results: Official Results

Men's Championship Division
- Score: 1–0
- Champion: BYU (12th title, 13th title game)
- Runners-up: UCLA (1st title game)
- Season MVP: Brayden Gonder (BYU)

Women's Championship Division
- Score: 0–0 (a.e.t.); 4–3 (pen.)
- Champion: Michigan State (3rd title, 3rd title game)
- Runners-up: San Diego State (3rd title game)
- Season MVP: Ally Maloney (Michigan State)

Men's Open Division
- Score: 1–0
- Champion: Cal Poly (1st title, 1st title game)
- Runners-up: San Diego State (3rd title game)
- Season MVP: Zachary Preucil (Cal Poly)

Women's Open Division
- Score: 2–0
- Champion: UCLA (4th title, 5th title game)
- Runners-up: Purdue (1st title game)
- Top seed: May Lu (UCLA)

NIRSA national soccer championships seasons
- ← 2024 2026

The 2025 NIRSA national soccer championship was the 31st NIRSA National Soccer Championships, the annual national championships for United States-based, collegiate club soccer teams organized by NIRSA. It took place at SCHEELS Overland Park Soccer Complex in Overland Park, Kansas, from Thursday, November 20, to Saturday, November 22, 2025.

== Overview ==
=== Men's championship ===
In the finals, 5-time reigning champs, BYU, would make their 6th straight finals and face finals debutants, UCLA. Prior to this, in the group stage, UCLA would top their group after tying Georgetown 1–1 in the opener then defeating two-time runner-up, Illinois, 3–1 in the group stage finale. Meanwhile, after defeating New Hampshire 2–0 in their opener, BYU would tie reigning quarterfinalist and 2010 champion, Colorado, 1–1 in their second match. This tie would break BYU's 24-game win streak in the national tournament, dating back to the 2021 group stage opener against Notre Dame and notably, with Colorado defeating New Hampshire 3–0 in the group stage finale, BYU would finish second in their group which marked the first time in their 15 appearances where they didn't top the group.

In the knockout round, UCLA would defeat Auburn 3–1 then would require penalties against Wisconsin following a 1–1 draw in regulation but would edge the Badgers 4–1 to advance to their second semifinals in 3 years. Meanwhile, BYU would beat Virginia Tech 1–0 in the round of 16 in a rematch of the 2023 finals and would then beat Arkansas 2–0. In the semifinals, BYU would defeat Boston College 2–1 while UCLA would defeat Colorado 2–0, preventing a group stage rematch for BYU.

In the finals, the game would remained deadlocked until the 62nd minute, where Ethan Christensen of BYU scored on an assist from Aaron Jolley in what would end up being the game winner in a 1–0 victory. BYU's Brayden Gonder would be named the tournament's MVP. This win would be BYU's 6th straight national title, overtaking UC-Santa Barbara's women's team for sole possession of the longest championship streak which was previously 5.

=== Women's championship ===
In the finals, 2006 champion San Diego State would face two-time champions, Michigan State. Prior to this, in the group stage, both teams would top their group with San Diego State tying 2023 semifinalist Vanderbilt 0–0 then defeating 2018 semifinalist Illinois 1–0 in the group stage finale while Michigan State would defeat Grand Canyon 5–0 in the opener then would defeat Auburn 3–1 in the group stage finale.

In the knockout round, San Diego State would defeat Auburn 3–1 then would require penalties against Colorado in the quarterfinals that they'd ultimately win 5–3. Meanwhile, Michigan State would defeat Illinois 3–0 and then would defeat two-time runners-up, Texas, 1–0 to advance to their first semifinals since 2016. In the semifinals, Michigan State would beat region II champions, Tennessee 2–1 while San Diego State would defeat Cornell 2–0.

In the finals, Michigan State and San Diego State would be deadlocked after regulation, meaning overtime would be required for the first time since 2022. Overtime would also be deadlocked, meaning penalties would be required for the first time since 2010. In the shootout, Michigan State would kick first and both goalkeepers would save the opening kick. Following this, both teams would each hit their next 3 kicks, leaving the score tied at 3–3 going into the fifth and final round. Michigan State would hit their and goalkeeper Ally Maloney of Michigan State would save San Diego State's final shot, winning the match for Michigan State 4–3. Ally Maloney would earn MVP honors for her two saves in the shootout accompanied with her 4 shutouts and 2 goals against in 6 games.

=== Men's open ===
In the finals, 2012 open champions, San Diego State would face 2017 championship runners-up Cal Poly. Prior to this, in the group stage, both teams would top their group by winning all 3 games. San Diego State would defeat 2007 open champs Missouri 3–1, LSU 3–1, and Cornell 2–1 while Cal Poly would defeat Cincinnati 3–1, Charleston via forfeit, and Sacred Heart 5–0.

In the knockout round, San Diego State would defeat 2023 open champions Miami (OH) 3–2 in the quarterfinals and then would require penalties against 2023 open runners-up Purdue following a 1–1 draw. San Diego State would win 3–2 and advance to their first open final since 2012. Meanwhile, Cal Poly would defeat Quinnipiac 2–0 in the quarterfinals then would defeat 2007 championship division winners UC-Santa Barbara 3–0 in the semifinals. In the finals, Cal Poly would score the match's lone goal and win the game 1–0. This would be Cal Poly's A-team's first open title (their "B-team" won in 2010) and Cal Poly's Zachary Preucil would be named the tournament's MVP.

=== Women's open ===
In the finals, three-time open champions, reigning championship runner-up and 2023 championship winner, UCLA, would face 1996 championship runner-up, Purdue. Prior to this, in the group stage, both teams would top their group by winning all three group stage matches. UCLA would defeat Ohio 5–0, UCF 3–1, and Arkansas 5–0 while Purdue would defeat 2018 open division runners-up, USC, 4–0, Iowa State 5–0, and Springfield 2–0.

In the knockout round, UCLA would defeat 1996 championship winners, Miami (OH) 2–0 in the quarterfinals then would require penalties against 2018 championship runners-up, UC Davis following a 1–1 draw. UCLA would win the shootout 3–2 to advance to the open finals. Meanwhile, Purdue would require penalties against Michigan State "B" in the quarterfinals following a deadlocked regulation and would win the shootout 5–4 to advance to the semifinals where they defeated reigning open champion, Colorado "B", 2–0 to make their first open finals. In the finals, UCLA would defeat Purdue 2–0 to claim their 4th open division title. This gives them sole possession of having the title of most open titles won. UCLA's May Lu would be named the tournament's MVP.

== Format ==
The competition consisted of 96 teams partitioned into 48 men's teams and 48 women's teams. Each of these partitions were further divided into two 24-team divisions, an invite-only championship division and an open division. These divisions were finally be divided into groups, eight groups of three teams each in championship divisions and six groups of four teams each in the open divisions. All four divisions engaged in a round-robin tournament where they played each team in their group and utilized the three points for a win system to determine teams able to advance to the single elimination, knockout stage. In the championship division, the two highest ranked teams from each group advanced to their knockout stage, with the third placed team advancing to the consolation bracket. In the open division, the top team from each group as well as the two best second placed teams advanced to their knockout stage. The primary criteria for determining the best team will be points followed by the following:

Tie-breaking criteria for group play
The ranking of teams in each group was based on the following criteria in order:
1. Highest number of points
2. Winner of head-to-head competition
3. Greatest goal difference
  - Maximum ± 5 goal difference per match
4. Most goals scored
5. Most shutouts

In a tie breaking scenario involving more than 2 teams, the tiebreaker procedure would begin. If one team is identified as different and both remaining teams are still tied, the tie breaker procedure is restarted.

If a tie still remained after the first 5 criteria, the following was used to break a tie:

1. NCAA kicks from the mark
  - If there was a three-way tie, a coin-flip would be conducted. The two teams that chose the same outcome would compete in kicks from the mark between each other. The winner would compete with the last remaining team in kicks from the mark
  - If there's a four-way tie, a drawing of lots would be conducted (only could occur in open division)

Pool play games were two 40-minute halves, separated by a seven-minute halftime. Knockout stage games also consisted of two 40-minute halves. The round of 16 and quarterfinals were separated by a seven-minute halftime while the semifinals and finals had a ten-minute halftime. Knockout stage games need to declare a winner. If a knockout-stage game was tied at the end of regulation, kicks from the mark would determine the winner for every game except the finals. The finals required overtime which consisted of two, 10-minute periods played in their entirety. If still tied after overtime, kicks from the mark would again determine the winner.

=== Seeding ===
In the championship division, teams advancing to the knockout round were placed on opposite ends of the bracket as the other team in their group. The first round matches were against 1st placed teams vs 2nd placed teams with pairings being pools A vs D, pools H vs E, pools G vs F, and pools B vs C. Following this round, the winner of the A vs D match would face the winner of the H vs E match while the winner of the G vs F match would face the winner of the B vs C match. In the consolation bracket, the first round pairings were pools A vs E, pools F vs B, pools C vs G, and pools H vs D with the winner of the A vs E match facing the winner of the F vs B match and the winner of the C vs G match facing the winner of the H vs D match.

In the open division, the bracket was numbered top to bottom from 1–8. First, the highest ranked wildcard team was placed in position 4 with the other wildcard team being placed in position 8. Then, the pool winner from the group with the wildcard team in position 4 was placed in position 5 and the pool winner from the group with the wildcard team in position 8 was placed in position 1. Finally, using the tiebreaking procedures, the highest ranked remaining group winning team was placed in position 3, the second highest was placed in position 7, the third highest placed in position 2, and the final being placed in position 6.

== Qualification and selections ==
Each of the six regions received three automatic bids for both the men's and women's championship that they awarded to its members. The final six bids were considered "at-large", and were given out by NIRSA to teams, typically based on the regional tournament results and RPI.

The 48 remaining teams participated in the open division and were selected via a lottery draw that will air on Wednesday, October 8, 2025, at 12pm EST. Any team with membership in a NIRSA-affiliated league or with a minimum of four games played prior to the tournament was able to enter their name into the lottery. If a selected team qualified for the championship division, an alternate took their spot.

=== Men's championship ===
Automatic qualifiers
Region	Method	Team	Appearance	Last Bid
I	Tournament; Co-champ	New Hampshire	1st	Never
I	Tournament; Co-champ	Georgetown	3rd	2023
I	Highest Power; Ranked team	Boston College	3rd	2017
II	Tournament; Champion	Georgia Tech	6th	2024
II	Tournament; Runner-up	Virginia Tech	13th	2024
II	Highest Power; Ranked team	Auburn	5th	2012
III	Tournament; Co-champ	Michigan State	14th	2022
III	Tournament; Co-champ	Wisconsin	9th	2023
III	Highest Power; Ranked team	Illinois	18th	2024
IV	North Tournament; Champion	Saint Louis	3rd	2024
IV	South Tournament; Bid Game 1 Winner	Texas	24th	2024
IV	South Tournament; Bid Game 2 Winner	Arkansas	2nd	2019
V	Pool 1 Winner	Minnesota	19th	2023
V	Pool 2 Winner	Colorado	23rd	2024
V	Bracket Play; Winner	Arizona State	4th	2023
VI	North Tournament; Champion	Oregon	10th	2024
VI	North Tournament; Runner-up	Washington	1st	Never
VI	South Tournament; Champion	UCLA	7th	2023

At-large bids
Region	Team	Appearance	Last Bid
I	Delaware	16th	2024
I	Rutgers	4th	2024
II	UCF	6th	2024
II	Virginia	11th	2018
IV	Texas A&M	23rd	2024
VI	BYU	15th	2024

=== Women's championship ===
Automatic qualifiers
Region	Method	Team	Appearance	Last Bid
I	Tournament; Co-champ	Brown	1st	Never
I	Tournament; Co-champ	Cornell	12th	2023
I	Highest Power; Ranked team	Syracuse	2nd	2016
II	Tournament; Champion	Tennessee	3rd	1996
II	Tournament; Runner-up	Virginia Tech	18th	2022
II	Highest Power; Ranked team	Auburn	2nd	2024
III	Tournament; Co-champ	Michigan State	17th	2024
III	Highest Power Ranked team	Illinois	17th	2023
III	Second Highest Power; Ranked team	Michigan	23rd	2024
IV	North Tournament; Champion	WashU	7th	2024
IV	South Tournament; Bid Game 1 Winner	Texas	24th	2024
IV	South Tournament; Bid Game 2 Winner	Texas A&M	4th	2024
V	Pool 1 Winner	Colorado	30th	2024
V	Pool 2 Winner	Grand Canyon	1st	Never
V	Bracket Play; Winner	Missouri	3rd	2013
VI	North Tournament; Champion	Utah	1st	Never
VI	North Tournament; Runner-up	Boise State	2nd	2023
VI	South Tournament; Champion	San Diego State	11th	2012

At-large bids
Region	Team	Appearance	Last Bid
I	Maryland	4th	2003
II	North Carolina	20th	2024
II	Vanderbilt	3rd	2023
III	Wisconsin	7th	2022
III	Ohio State	23rd	2023
IV	Texas State	4th	2010

=== Men's lottery selection ===
Full men's lottery selections
Region	Team	Selection Type	Bid result
I	Cornell	Automatic	Accepted
I	Boston College	Automatic	Championship
I	Sacred Heart	Automatic	Accepted
I	Quinnipiac	Automatic	Accepted
I	Brown	Waitlist	Accepted from waitlist
I	UMass-Amherst	Waitlist	Not given
I	UConn	Waitlist	Not given
II	Elon	Automatic	Accepted
II	Charleston	Automatic	Accepted
II	Western Kentucky	Automatic	Accepted
II	Tampa	Automatic	Accepted
II	Virginia Tech	Waitlist	Championship
II	JMU	Waitlist	Not given
II	Northern Kentucky	Waitlist	Not given
II	High Point	Waitlist	Not given
II	Georgia Southern	Waitlist	Not given
III	Akron	Automatic	Not accepted
III	Miami (OH)	Automatic	Accepted
III	Saginaw Valley State	Automatic	Not accepted
III	Illinois	Automatic	Championship
III	Cincinnati	Waitlist	Accepted from waitlist
III	Wisconsin	Waitlist	Championship
III	Xavier	Waitlist	Not accepted
III	Grand Valley	Waitlist	Not accepted
III	Central Michigan	Waitlist	Not accepted
III	Purdue	Waitlist	Accepted from waitlist
III	Butler	Waitlist	Not accepted
III	Hillsdale College	Waitlist	Accepted from waitlist
III	IU-Indy	Waitlist	Not given
IV	Texas A&M	Automatic	Accepted
IV	Rice	Automatic	Not accepted
IV	Sam Houston State	Automatic	Accepted
IV	Arkansas	Automatic	Championship
IV	LSU	Waitlist	Accepted from waitlist
IV	Texas	Waitlist	Championship
IV	Abilene Christian	Waitlist	Accepted from waitlist
V	Minnesota	Automatic	Accepted
V	Kansas	Automatic	Accepted
V	Missouri	Automatic	Accepted
V	Colorado	Automatic	Accepted
V	Nebraska-Omaha	Waitlist	Not given
V	Kansas State	Waitlist	Not given
VI	UCLA	Automatic	Championship
VI	San Diego State	Automatic	Accepted
VI	Cal Poly	Automatic	Accepted
VI	Oregon	Automatic	Championship
VI	Weber State	Waitlist	Accepted from waitlist
VI	UC-Santa Barbara	Waitlist	Accepted from waitlist
VI	Cal State Fullerton	Waitlist	Not given
VI	Utah Valley	Waitlist	Not given

Participating men's lottery teams
Region	Team	Selection Type	Bid result
I	Cornell	Automatic	Accepted
I	Sacred Heart	Automatic	Accepted
I	Quinnipiac	Automatic	Accepted
I	Brown	Waitlist	Accepted from waitlist
II	Elon	Automatic	Accepted
II	Charleston	Automatic	Accepted
II	Western Kentucky	Automatic	Accepted
II	Tampa	Automatic	Accepted
III	Miami (OH)	Automatic	Accepted
III	Cincinnati	Waitlist	Accepted from waitlist
III	Purdue	Waitlist	Accepted from waitlist
III	Hillsdale College	Waitlist	Accepted from waitlist
IV	Texas A&M	Automatic	Accepted
IV	Sam Houston State	Automatic	Accepted
IV	LSU	Waitlist	Accepted from waitlist
IV	Abilene Christian	Waitlist	Accepted from waitlist
V	Minnesota	Automatic	Accepted
V	Kansas	Automatic	Accepted
V	Missouri	Automatic	Accepted
V	Colorado	Automatic	Accepted
VI	San Diego State	Automatic	Accepted
VI	Cal Poly	Automatic	Accepted
VI	Weber State	Waitlist	Accepted from waitlist
VI	UC-Santa Barbara	Waitlist	Accepted from waitlist

=== Women's lottery selection ===
Full women's lottery selections
Region	Team	Selection Type	Bid result
I	Syracuse	Automatic	Championship
I	Springfield	Automatic	Accepted
I	Rochester	Automatic	Accepted
I	George Washington	Automatic	Accepted
I	Quinnipiac	Waitlist	Not accepted
I	Penn State	Waitlist	Accepted from waitlist
I	Brown	Waitlist	Championship
I	Millersville	Waitlist	Not accepted
I	Cornell	Waitlist	Championship
I	RIT	Waitlist	Not accepted
I	Boston College	Waitlist	Accepted from waitlist
I	Maryland	Waitlist	Championship
I	Villanova	Waitlist	Not given
I	UConn	Waitlist	Not given
I	Penn	Waitlist	Not given
II	UCF	Automatic	Accepted
II	Western Carolina	Automatic	Accepted
II	High Point	Automatic	Accepted
II	Alabama	Automatic	Accepted
II	Tampa	Waitlist	Not given
II	Miami	Waitlist	Not given
II	JMU	Waitlist	Not given
II	Virginia Tech	Waitlist	Championship
II	Florida State	Waitlist	Not given
III	Miami (OH)	Automatic	Accepted
III	Central Michigan	Automatic	Accepted
III	Oakland	Automatic	Not accepted
III	Michigan State	Automatic	Championship
III	Purdue	Waitlist	Accepted from waitlist
III	Ohio State	Waitlist	Championship
III	Ohio	Waitlist	Accepted from waitlist
III	Illinois	Waitlist	Championship
III	Cincinnati	Waitlist	Not given
III	Notre Dame	Waitlist	Not given
III	Western Michigan	Waitlist	Not given
IV	Texas A&M	Automatic	Championship
IV	Baylor	Automatic	Accepted
IV	Iowa State	Automatic	Accepted
IV	Texas	Automatic	Championship
IV	LSU	Waitlist	Not accepted
IV	Missouri State	Waitlist	Not accepted
IV	Arkansas	Waitlist	Accepted from waitlist
V	Colorado	Automatic	Accepted
V	Missouri	Automatic	Championship
V	Kansas	Automatic	Accepted
V	Arizona	Automatic	Not accepted
V	Northern Colorado	Waitlist	Accepted from waitlist
V	Creighton	Waitlist	Not given
V	Colorado Mines	Waitlist	Not given
V	Minnesota	Waitlist	Not given
V	Air Force	Waitlist	Not given
VI	UCLA	Automatic	Accepted
VI	UC Davis	Automatic	Accepted
VI	USC	Automatic	Accepted
VI	Oregon State	Automatic	Accepted
VI	CS San Marcos	Waitlist	Not given
VI	Oregon	Waitlist	Not given
VI	UC-Santa Barbara	Waitlist	Not given
VI	UC Irvine	Waitlist	Not given
VI	San Diego State	Waitlist	Championship
VI	Cal Poly	Waitlist	Not given
VI	Montana State	Waitlist	Not given

Participating women's lottery teams
Region	Team	Selection Type	Bid result
I	Springfield	Automatic	Accepted
I	Rochester	Automatic	Accepted
I	George Washington	Automatic	Accepted
I	Penn State	Waitlist	Accepted from waitlist
I	Boston College	Waitlist	Accepted from waitlist
II	UCF	Automatic	Accepted
II	Western Carolina	Automatic	Accepted
II	High Point	Automatic	Accepted
II	Alabama	Automatic	Accepted
III	Miami (OH)	Automatic	Accepted
III	Central Michigan	Automatic	Accepted
III	Michigan State	Automatic	Accepted
III	Purdue	Waitlist	Accepted from waitlist
III	Ohio	Waitlist	Accepted from waitlist
IV	Baylor	Automatic	Accepted
IV	Iowa State	Automatic	Accepted
IV	Arkansas	Waitlist	Accepted from waitlist
V	Colorado	Automatic	Accepted
V	Kansas	Automatic	Accepted
V	Northern Colorado	Waitlist	Accepted from waitlist
VI	UCLA	Automatic	Accepted
VI	UC Davis	Automatic	Accepted
VI	USC	Automatic	Accepted
VI	Oregon State	Automatic	Accepted

== Group stage ==
Tie-breaking criteria for group play
The ranking of teams in each group was based on the following criteria in order:
1. Highest number of points
2. Winner of head-to-head competition
3. Greatest goal difference
  - Maximum ± 5 goal difference per match
4. Most goals scored
5. Most shutouts

In a tie breaking scenario involving more than 2 teams, the tiebreaker procedure would begin as normal. If one team is identified as different and both remaining teams are still tied, the tie breaker procedure is restarted.

If a tie still remained after the first 5 criteria, the following was used to break a tie:

1. NCAA kicks from the mark
  - If there was a three-way tie, a coin-flip would be conducted. The two teams that chose the same outcome would compete in kicks from the mark between each other. The winner would compete with the last remaining team in kicks from the mark
  - If there's a four-way tie, a drawing of lots would be conducted (only could occur in open division)

=== Men's championship ===
Group A
Pos	Team	Pld	W	D	L	GF	GA	GD	Pts	Qualification
1	Michigan State	2	2	0	0	2	0	+2	6	Advanced to knockout stage
2	UCF	2	1	0	1	1	1	0	3	Advanced to knockout stage
3	Oregon	2	0	0	2	0	2	−2	0	Consolation

Scores

8:00am CST	Michigan State	1–0	UCF	Field 1
Thu, November 20		Report		Stadium: Scheels Overland Park Soccer Complex; Overland Park, Kansas

1:15pm CST	UCF	1–0	Oregon	Field 8
Thu, November 20		Report		Stadium: Scheels Overland Park Soccer Complex; Overland Park, Kansas

6:30pm CST	Oregon	0–1	Michigan State	Field 5
Thu, November 20		Report		Stadium: Scheels Overland Park Soccer Complex; Overland Park, Kansas

Group B
Pos	Team	Pld	W	D	L	GF	GA	GD	Pts	Qualification
1	Boston College	2	2	0	0	5	2	+3	6	Advanced to knockout stage
2	Auburn	2	1	0	1	5	4	+1	3	Advanced to knockout stage
3	Washington	2	0	0	2	2	6	−4	0	Consolation

Scores

8:00am CST	Boston College	2–1	Washington	Field 2
Thu, November 20		Report		Stadium: Scheels Overland Park Soccer Complex; Overland Park, Kansas

1:15pm CST	Washington	1–4	Auburn	Field 7
Thu, November 20		Report		Stadium: Scheels Overland Park Soccer Complex; Overland Park, Kansas

6:30pm CST	Auburn	1–3	Boston College	Field 6
Thu, November 20		Report		Stadium: Scheels Overland Park Soccer Complex; Overland Park, Kansas

Group C
Pos	Team	Pld	W	D	L	GF	GA	GD	Pts	Qualification
1	UCLA	2	1	1	0	4	2	+2	4	Advanced to knockout stage
2	Illinois	2	1	0	1	3	4	−1	3	Advanced to knockout stage
3	Georgetown	2	0	1	1	2	3	−1	1	Consolation

Scores

8:00am CST	UCLA	1–1	Georgetown	Field 3
Thu, November 20		Report		Stadium: Scheels Overland Park Soccer Complex; Overland Park, Kansas

1:15pm CST	Georgetown	1–2	Illinois	Field 6
Thu, November 20		Report		Stadium: Scheels Overland Park Soccer Complex; Overland Park, Kansas

6:30pm CST	Illinois	1–3	UCLA	Field 7
Thu, November 20		Report		Stadium: Scheels Overland Park Soccer Complex; Overland Park, Kansas

Group D
Pos	Team	Pld	W	D	L	GF	GA	GD	Pts	Qualification
1	Georgia Tech	2	2	0	0	5	3	+2	6	Advanced to knockout stage
2	Arkansas	2	1	0	1	5	4	+1	3	Advanced to knockout stage
3	Delaware	2	0	0	2	2	5	−3	0	Consolation

Scores

8:00am CST	Georgia Tech	2–1	Delaware	Field 4
Thu, November 20		Report		Stadium: Scheels Overland Park Soccer Complex; Overland Park, Kansas

1:15pm CST	Delaware	1–3	Arkansas	Field 5
Thu, November 20		Report		Stadium: Scheels Overland Park Soccer Complex; Overland Park, Kansas

6:30pm CST	Arkansas	2–3	Georgia Tech	Field 8
Thu, November 20		Report		Stadium: Scheels Overland Park Soccer Complex; Overland Park, Kansas

Group E
Pos	Team	Pld	W	D	L	GF	GA	GD	Pts	Qualification
1	Colorado	2	1	1	0	4	1	+3	4	Advanced to knockout stage
2	BYU	2	1	1	0	3	1	+2	4	Advanced to knockout stage
3	New Hampshire	2	0	0	2	0	5	−5	0	Consolation

Scores

8:00am CST	New Hampshire	0–2	BYU	Field 5
Thu, November 20		Report	Aaron Jolley 23'; Brayden Gonder	Stadium: Scheels Overland Park Soccer Complex; Overland Park, Kansas

1:15pm CST	BYU	1–1	Colorado	Field 4
Thu, November 20	Colorado Team (o.g.)	Report	Dylan Joudieh	Stadium: Scheels Overland Park Soccer Complex; Overland Park, Kansas

6:30pm CST	Colorado	3–0	New Hampshire	Field 1
Thu, November 20		Report		Stadium: Scheels Overland Park Soccer Complex; Overland Park, Kansas

Group F
Pos	Team	Pld	W	D	L	GF	GA	GD	Pts	Qualification
1	Wisconsin	2	1	1	0	4	1	+3	4	Advanced to knockout stage
2	Virginia	2	1	1	0	3	2	+1	4	Advanced to knockout stage
3	Saint Louis	2	0	0	2	1	5	−4	0	Consolation

Scores

8:00am CST	Wisconsin	1–1	Virginia	Field 6
Thu, November 20		Report		Stadium: Scheels Overland Park Soccer Complex; Overland Park, Kansas

1:15pm CST	Virginia	2–1	Saint Louis	Field 3
Thu, November 20		Report		Stadium: Scheels Overland Park Soccer Complex; Overland Park, Kansas

6:30pm CST	Saint Louis	0–3	Wisconsin	Field 2
Thu, November 20		Report		Stadium: Scheels Overland Park Soccer Complex; Overland Park, Kansas

Group G
Pos	Team	Pld	W	D	L	GF	GA	GD	Pts	Qualification
1	Texas	2	2	0	0	2	0	+2	6	Advanced to knockout stage
2	Rutgers	2	1	0	1	2	2	0	3	Advanced to knockout stage
3	Arizona State	2	0	0	2	1	3	−2	0	Consolation

Scores

8:00am CST	Texas	1–0	Rutgers	Field 7
Thu, November 20		Report		Stadium: Scheels Overland Park Soccer Complex; Overland Park, Kansas

1:15pm CST	Rutgers	2–1	Arizona State	Field 2
Thu, November 20		Report		Stadium: Scheels Overland Park Soccer Complex; Overland Park, Kansas

6:30pm CST	Arizona State	0–1	Texas	Field 3
Thu, November 20		Report		Stadium: Scheels Overland Park Soccer Complex; Overland Park, Kansas

Group H
Pos	Team	Pld	W	D	L	GF	GA	GD	Pts	Qualification
1	Virginia Tech	2	1	1	0	7	2	+5	4	Advanced to knockout stage
2	Minnesota	2	1	1	0	3	1	+2	4	Advanced to knockout stage
3	Texas A&M	2	0	0	2	1	8	−7	0	Consolation

Scores

8:00am CST	Minnesota	2–0	Texas A&M	Field 8
Thu, November 20		Report		Stadium: Scheels Overland Park Soccer Complex; Overland Park, Kansas

1:15pm CST	Texas A&M	1–6	Virginia Tech	Field 1
Thu, November 20		Report		Stadium: Scheels Overland Park Soccer Complex; Overland Park, Kansas

6:30pm CST	Virginia Tech	1–1	Minnesota	Field 4
Thu, November 20		Report		Stadium: Scheels Overland Park Soccer Complex; Overland Park, Kansas

=== Women's championship ===
Group A
Pos	Team	Pld	W	D	L	GF	GA	GD	Pts	Qualification
1	Michigan State	2	2	0	0	8	1	+7	6	Advanced to knockout stage
2	Auburn	2	1	0	1	3	4	−1	3	Advanced to knockout stage
3	Grand Canyon	2	0	0	2	1	7	−6	0	Consolation

Scores

9:45am CST	Michigan State	5–0	Grand Canyon	Field 1
Thu, November 20		Report		Stadium: Scheels Overland Park Soccer Complex; Overland Park, Kansas

3:00pm CST	Grand Canyon	1–2	Auburn	Field 8
Thu, November 20		Report		Stadium: Scheels Overland Park Soccer Complex; Overland Park, Kansas

8:15pm CST	Auburn	1–3	Michigan State	Field 5
Thu, November 20		Report		Stadium: Scheels Overland Park Soccer Complex; Overland Park, Kansas

Group B
Pos	Team	Pld	W	D	L	GF	GA	GD	Pts	Qualification
1	Tennessee	2	1	1	0	2	0	+2	4	Advanced to knockout stage
2	Maryland	2	1	1	0	2	1	+1	4	Advanced to knockout stage
3	Utah	2	0	0	2	1	4	−3	0	Consolation

Scores

9:45am CST	Tennessee	0–0	Maryland	Field 2
Thu, November 20		Report		Stadium: Scheels Overland Park Soccer Complex; Overland Park, Kansas

3:00pm CST	Maryland	2–1	Utah	Field 7
Thu, November 20		Report		Stadium: Scheels Overland Park Soccer Complex; Overland Park, Kansas

8:15pm CST	Utah	0–2	Tennessee	Field 6
Thu, November 20		Report		Stadium: Scheels Overland Park Soccer Complex; Overland Park, Kansas

Group C
Pos	Team	Pld	W	D	L	GF	GA	GD	Pts	Qualification
1	Cornell	2	1	1	0	1	0	+1	4	Advanced to knockout stage
2	WashU	2	0	2	0	1	1	0	2	Advanced to knockout stage
3	Boise State	2	0	1	1	1	2	−1	1	Consolation

Scores

9:45am CST	Cornell	1–0	Boise State	Field 3
Thu, November 20		Report		Stadium: Scheels Overland Park Soccer Complex; Overland Park, Kansas

3:00pm CST	Boise State	1–1	WashU	Field 6
Thu, November 20		Report		Stadium: Scheels Overland Park Soccer Complex; Overland Park, Kansas

8:15pm CST	WashU	0–0	Cornell	Field 7
Thu, November 20		Report		Stadium: Scheels Overland Park Soccer Complex; Overland Park, Kansas

Group D
Pos	Team	Pld	W	D	L	GF	GA	GD	Pts	Qualification
1	San Diego State	2	1	1	0	1	0	+1	4	Advanced to knockout stage
2	Illinois	2	1	0	1	1	1	0	3	Advanced to knockout stage
3	Vanderbilt	2	0	1	1	0	1	−1	1	Consolation

Scores

9:45am CST	San Diego State	0–0	Vanderbilt	Field 4
Thu, November 20		Report		Stadium: Scheels Overland Park Soccer Complex; Overland Park, Kansas

3:00pm CST	Vanderbilt	0–1	Illinois	Field 5
Thu, November 20		Report		Stadium: Scheels Overland Park Soccer Complex; Overland Park, Kansas

8:15pm CST	Illinois	0–1	San Diego State	Field 8
Thu, November 20		Report		Stadium: Scheels Overland Park Soccer Complex; Overland Park, Kansas

Group E
Pos	Team	Pld	W	D	L	GF	GA	GD	Pts	Qualification
1	Syracuse	2	1	1	0	1	0	+1	4	Advanced to knockout stage
2	Texas	2	0	2	0	1	1	0	2	Advanced to knockout stage
3	Wisconsin	2	0	1	1	1	2	−1	1	Consolation

Scores

9:45am CST	Texas	1–1	Wisconsin	Field 5
Thu, November 20		Report		Stadium: Scheels Overland Park Soccer Complex; Overland Park, Kansas

3:00pm CST	Wisconsin	0–1	Syracuse	Field 4
Thu, November 20		Report		Stadium: Scheels Overland Park Soccer Complex; Overland Park, Kansas

8:15pm CST	Syracuse	0–0	Texas	Field 1
Thu, November 20		Report		Stadium: Scheels Overland Park Soccer Complex; Overland Park, Kansas

Group F
Pos	Team	Pld	W	D	L	GF	GA	GD	Pts	Qualification
1	Michigan	2	1	1	0	3	0	+3	4	Advanced to knockout stage
2	Missouri	2	1	1	0	2	0	+2	4	Advanced to knockout stage
3	Texas State	2	0	0	2	0	5	−5	0	Consolation

Scores

9:45am CST	Michigan	3–0	Texas State	Field 6
Thu, November 20		Report		Stadium: Scheels Overland Park Soccer Complex; Overland Park, Kansas

3:00pm CST	Texas State	0–2	Missouri	Field 3
Thu, November 20		Report		Stadium: Scheels Overland Park Soccer Complex; Overland Park, Kansas

8:15pm CST	Missouri	0–0	Michigan	Field 2
Thu, November 20		Report		Stadium: Scheels Overland Park Soccer Complex; Overland Park, Kansas

Group G
Pos	Team	Pld	W	D	L	GF	GA	GD	Pts	Qualification
1	Brown	2	1	1	0	3	2	+1	4	Advanced to knockout stage
2	Ohio State	2	1	1	0	1	0	+1	4	Advanced to knockout stage
3	Virginia Tech	2	0	0	2	2	4	−2	0	Consolation

Scores

9:45am CST	Brown	0–0	Ohio State	Field 7
Thu, November 20		Report		Stadium: Scheels Overland Park Soccer Complex; Overland Park, Kansas

3:00pm CST	Ohio State	1–0	Virginia Tech	Field 2
Thu, November 20		Report		Stadium: Scheels Overland Park Soccer Complex; Overland Park, Kansas

8:15pm CST	Virginia Tech	2–3	Brown	Field 3
Thu, November 20		Report		Stadium: Scheels Overland Park Soccer Complex; Overland Park, Kansas

Group H
Pos	Team	Pld	W	D	L	GF	GA	GD	Pts	Qualification
1	North Carolina	2	1	1	0	5	2	+3	4	Advanced to knockout stage
2	Colorado	2	1	1	0	3	2	+1	4	Advanced to knockout stage
3	Texas A&M	2	0	0	2	2	6	−4	0	Consolation

Scores

9:45am CST	Texas A&M	1–4	North Carolina	Field 8
Thu, November 20		Report		Stadium: Scheels Overland Park Soccer Complex; Overland Park, Kansas

3:00pm CST	North Carolina	1–1	Colorado	Field 1
Thu, November 20		Report		Stadium: Scheels Overland Park Soccer Complex; Overland Park, Kansas

8:15pm CST	Colorado	2–1	Texas A&M	Field 4
Thu, November 20		Report		Stadium: Scheels Overland Park Soccer Complex; Overland Park, Kansas

=== Men's open ===
Group A
Pos	Team	Pld	W	D	L	GF	GA	GD	Pts	Qualification
1	San Diego State	3	3	0	0	8	3	+5	9	Advanced to knockout stage
2	Missouri	3	1	1	1	5	6	−1	4	
3	Cornell	3	0	2	1	2	3	−1	2	
4	LSU	3	0	1	2	3	6	−3	1	

Scores

8:00am CST	Cornell	0–0	LSU	Field 9
Thu, November 20		Report		Stadium: Scheels Overland Park Soccer Complex; Overland Park, Kansas

8:00am CST	San Diego State	3–1	Missouri	Field 10
Thu, November 20		Report		Stadium: Scheels Overland Park Soccer Complex; Overland Park, Kansas

3:00pm CST	Missouri	1–1	Cornell	Field 9
Thu, November 20		Report		Stadium: Scheels Overland Park Soccer Complex; Overland Park, Kansas

3:00pm CST	LSU	1–3	San Diego State	Field 10
Thu, November 20		Report		Stadium: Scheels Overland Park Soccer Complex; Overland Park, Kansas

8:00am CST	Cornell	1–2	San Diego State	Field 12
Fri, November 21		Report		Stadium: Scheels Overland Park Soccer Complex; Overland Park, Kansas

8:00am CST	Missouri	3–2	LSU	Field 1
Fri, November 21		Report		Stadium: Scheels Overland Park Soccer Complex; Overland Park, Kansas

Group B
Pos	Team	Pld	W	D	L	GF	GA	GD	Pts	Qualification
1	UC-Santa Barbara	3	2	1	0	4	2	+2	7	Advanced to knockout stage
2	Elon	3	1	1	1	2	2	0	4	
3	Brown	3	0	3	0	4	4	0	3	
4	Colorado "Black"	3	0	1	2	3	5	−2	1	

Scores

8:00am CST	Elon	2–1	Colorado "Black"	Field 11
Thu, November 20		Report		Stadium: Scheels Overland Park Soccer Complex; Overland Park, Kansas

8:00am CST	Brown	2–2	UC-Santa Barbara	Field 12
Thu, November 20		Report		Stadium: Scheels Overland Park Soccer Complex; Overland Park, Kansas

3:00pm CST	UC-Santa Barbara	1–0	Elon	Field 11
Thu, November 20		Report		Stadium: Scheels Overland Park Soccer Complex; Overland Park, Kansas

3:00pm CST	Colorado "Black"	2–2	Brown	Field 12
Thu, November 20		Report		Stadium: Scheels Overland Park Soccer Complex; Overland Park, Kansas

8:00am CST	Elon	0–0	Brown	Field 7
Fri, November 21		Report		Stadium: Scheels Overland Park Soccer Complex; Overland Park, Kansas

8:00am CST	UC-Santa Barbara	1–0	Colorado "Black"	Field 2
Fri, November 21		Report		Stadium: Scheels Overland Park Soccer Complex; Overland Park, Kansas

Group C
Pos	Team	Pld	W	D	L	GF	GA	GD	Pts	Qualification
1	Cal Poly	3	3	0	0	10	1	+9	9	Advanced to knockout stage
2	Cincinnati	3	1	1	1	4	4	0	4	
3	Sacred Heart	3	1	1	1	3	6	−3	4	
~~4~~	~~College of Charleston~~	~~3~~	~~0~~	~~0~~	~~3~~	~~0~~	~~6~~	~~−6~~	~~0~~	~~Did Not Appear~~

Scores

9:45am CST	Cincinnati	1–3	Cal Poly	Field 9
Thu, November 20		Report		Stadium: Scheels Overland Park Soccer Complex; Overland Park, Kansas

9:45am CST	~~College of Charleston~~	0–2; Forfeit	Sacred Heart	Field 10
Thu, November 20		Report		Stadium: Scheels Overland Park Soccer Complex; Overland Park, Kansas

4:45pm CST	Sacred Heart	1–1	Cincinnati	Field 9
Thu, November 20		Report		Stadium: Scheels Overland Park Soccer Complex; Overland Park, Kansas

4:45pm CST	Cal Poly	2–0; Forfeit	~~College of Charleston~~	Field 10
Thu, November 20		Report		Stadium: Scheels Overland Park Soccer Complex; Overland Park, Kansas

8:00am CST	Cincinnati	2–0; Forfeit	~~College of Charleston~~	Field 9
Fri, November 21		Report		Stadium: Scheels Overland Park Soccer Complex; Overland Park, Kansas

8:00am CST	Sacred Heart	0–5	Cal Poly	Field 3
Fri, November 21		Report		Stadium: Scheels Overland Park Soccer Complex; Overland Park, Kansas

Group D
Pos	Team	Pld	W	D	L	GF	GA	GD	Pts	Qualification
1	Miami (OH)	3	3	0	0	18	4	+12	9	Advanced to knockout stage
1	Quinnipiac	3	2	0	1	16	4	+8	6	
3	WKU	3	1	0	2	9	20	−9	3	
4	Abilene Christian	3	0	0	3	4	19	−11	0	

Scores

9:45am CST	Abilene Christian	0–8	Quinnipiac	Field 11
Thu, November 20		Report		Stadium: Scheels Overland Park Soccer Complex; Overland Park, Kansas

9:45am CST	Miami (OH)	9–3	WKU	Field 12
Thu, November 20		Report		Stadium: Scheels Overland Park Soccer Complex; Overland Park, Kansas

4:45pm CST	WKU	5–4	Abilene Christian	Field 11
Thu, November 20		Report		Stadium: Scheels Overland Park Soccer Complex; Overland Park, Kansas

4:45pm CST	Quinnipiac	1–3	Miami (OH)	Field 12
Thu, November 20		Report		Stadium: Scheels Overland Park Soccer Complex; Overland Park, Kansas

8:00am CST	Abilene Christian	0–6	Miami (OH)	Field 11
Fri, November 21		Report		Stadium: Scheels Overland Park Soccer Complex; Overland Park, Kansas

8:00am CST	WKU	1–7	Quinnipiac	Field 4
Fri, November 21		Report		Stadium: Scheels Overland Park Soccer Complex; Overland Park, Kansas

Group E
Pos	Team	Pld	W	D	L	GF	GA	GD	Pts	Qualification
1	Purdue	3	3	0	0	12	1	+9	9	Advanced to knockout stage
2	Tampa	3	2	0	1	5	3	+2	6	
3	Texas A&M "B"	3	1	0	2	1	8	−5	3	
4	Minnesota "Maroon"	3	0	0	3	0	6	−6	0	

Scores

11:30am CST	Minnesota "Maroon"	0–3	Tampa	Field 9
Thu, November 20		Report		Stadium: Scheels Overland Park Soccer Complex; Overland Park, Kansas

11:30am CST	Texas A&M "B"	0–7	Purdue	Field 10
Thu, November 20		Report		Stadium: Scheels Overland Park Soccer Complex; Overland Park, Kansas

6:30pm CST	Purdue	2–0	Minnesota "Maroon"	Field 9
Thu, November 20		Report		Stadium: Scheels Overland Park Soccer Complex; Overland Park, Kansas

6:30pm CST	Tampa	1–0	Texas A&M "B"	Field 10
Thu, November 20		Report		Stadium: Scheels Overland Park Soccer Complex; Overland Park, Kansas

8:00am CST	Minnesota "Maroon"	0–1	Texas A&M "B"	Field 8
Fri, November 21		Report		Stadium: Scheels Overland Park Soccer Complex; Overland Park, Kansas

8:00am CST	Purdue	3–1	Tampa	Field 5
Fri, November 21		Report		Stadium: Scheels Overland Park Soccer Complex; Overland Park, Kansas

Group F
Pos	Team	Pld	W	D	L	GF	GA	GD	Pts	Qualification
1	Weber State	3	2	1	0	17	3	+10	7	Advanced to knockout stage
1	Kansas	3	2	1	0	8	3	+5	7	Advanced to knockout stage
3	Hillsdale	3	1	0	2	3	9	−5	3	
4	Sam Houston State	3	0	0	3	1	14	−10	0	

Scores

11:30am CST	Weber State	6–0	Hillsdale	Field 11
Thu, November 20		Report		Stadium: Scheels Overland Park Soccer Complex; Overland Park, Kansas

11:30am CST	Kansas	3–0	Sam Houston State	Field 12
Thu, November 20		Report		Stadium: Scheels Overland Park Soccer Complex; Overland Park, Kansas

6:30pm CST	Sam Houston State	1–9	Weber State	Field 11
Thu, November 20		Report		Stadium: Scheels Overland Park Soccer Complex; Overland Park, Kansas

6:30pm CST	Hillsdale	1–3	Kansas	Field 12
Thu, November 20		Report		Stadium: Scheels Overland Park Soccer Complex; Overland Park, Kansas

8:00am CST	Weber State	2–2	Kansas	Field 10
Fri, November 21		Report		Stadium: Scheels Overland Park Soccer Complex; Overland Park, Kansas

8:00am CST	Sam Houston State	0–2	Hillsdale	Field 6
Fri, November 21		Report		Stadium: Scheels Overland Park Soccer Complex; Overland Park, Kansas

=== Women's open ===
Group A
Pos	Team	Pld	W	D	L	GF	GA	GD	Pts	Qualification
1	UC Davis	3	3	0	0	8	0	+8	9	Advanced to knockout stage
2	Kansas	3	2	0	1	3	3	0	6	
3	Penn State	3	0	1	2	0	3	−3	1	
4	High Point	3	0	1	2	1	6	−5	1	

Scores

11:30am CST	Penn State	0–0	High Point	Field 1
Thu, November 20		Report		Stadium: Scheels Overland Park Soccer Complex; Overland Park, Kansas

11:30am CST	UC Davis	2–0	Kansas	Field 2
Thu, November 20		Report		Stadium: Scheels Overland Park Soccer Complex; Overland Park, Kansas

4:45pm CST	Kansas	1–0	Penn State	Field 5
Thu, November 20		Report		Stadium: Scheels Overland Park Soccer Complex; Overland Park, Kansas

4:45pm CST	High Point	0–4	UC Davis	Field 6
Thu, November 20		Report		Stadium: Scheels Overland Park Soccer Complex; Overland Park, Kansas

9:45am CST	Penn State	0–2	UC Davis	Field 4
Fri, November 21		Report		Stadium: Scheels Overland Park Soccer Complex; Overland Park, Kansas

9:45am CST	Kansas	2–1	High Point	Field 5
Fri, November 21		Report		Stadium: Scheels Overland Park Soccer Complex; Overland Park, Kansas

Group B
Pos	Team	Pld	W	D	L	GF	GA	GD	Pts	Qualification
1	UCLA	3	3	0	0	13	1	+12	9	Advanced to knockout stage
2	UCF	3	2	0	1	4	3	+1	6	
3	Ohio	3	1	0	2	1	6	−5	3	
4	Arkansas	3	0	0	3	0	8	−8	0	

Scores

11:30am CST	UCF	2–0	Arkansas	Field 3
Thu, November 20		Report		Stadium: Scheels Overland Park Soccer Complex; Overland Park, Kansas

11:30am CST	Ohio	0–5	UCLA	Field 4
Thu, November 20		Report		Stadium: Scheels Overland Park Soccer Complex; Overland Park, Kansas

4:45pm CST	UCLA	3–1	UCF	Field 7
Thu, November 20		Report		Stadium: Scheels Overland Park Soccer Complex; Overland Park, Kansas

4:45pm CST	Arkansas	0–1	Ohio	Field 8
Thu, November 20		Report		Stadium: Scheels Overland Park Soccer Complex; Overland Park, Kansas

9:45am CST	UCF	1–0	Ohio	Field 11
Fri, November 21		Report		Stadium: Scheels Overland Park Soccer Complex; Overland Park, Kansas

9:45am CST	UCLA	5–0	Arkansas	Field 1
Fri, November 21		Report		Stadium: Scheels Overland Park Soccer Complex; Overland Park, Kansas

Group C
Pos	Team	Pld	W	D	L	GF	GA	GD	Pts	Qualification
1	Colorado "Black"	3	2	1	0	10	2	+6	7	Advanced to knockout stage
2	Miami (OH)	3	2	1	0	6	1	+5	7	Advanced to knockout stage
3	Rochester	3	1	0	2	3	4	−1	3	
4	Western Carolina	3	0	0	3	0	12	−10	0	

Scores

11:30am CST	Miami (OH)	1–1	Colorado "Black"	Field 5
Thu, November 20		Report		Stadium: Scheels Overland Park Soccer Complex; Overland Park, Kansas

11:30am CST	Western Carolina	0–2	Rochester	Field 6
Thu, November 20		Report		Stadium: Scheels Overland Park Soccer Complex; Overland Park, Kansas

4:45pm CST	Rochester	0–2	Miami (OH)	Field 3
Thu, November 20		Report		Stadium: Scheels Overland Park Soccer Complex; Overland Park, Kansas

4:45pm CST	Colorado "Black"	7–0	Western Carolina	Field 4
Thu, November 20		Report		Stadium: Scheels Overland Park Soccer Complex; Overland Park, Kansas

9:45am CST	Miami (OH)	3–0	Western Carolina	Field 2
Fri, November 21		Report		Stadium: Scheels Overland Park Soccer Complex; Overland Park, Kansas

9:45am CST	Rochester	1–2	Colorado "Black"	Field 3
Fri, November 21		Report		Stadium: Scheels Overland Park Soccer Complex; Overland Park, Kansas

Group D
Pos	Team	Pld	W	D	L	GF	GA	GD	Pts	Qualification
1	Central Michigan	3	2	0	1	4	2	+2	6	Advanced to knockout stage
2	George Washington	3	2	0	1	5	2	+3	6	
3	Baylor	3	2	0	1	4	3	+1	6	
4	Northern Colorado	3	0	0	3	0	6	−6	0	

Scores

11:30am CST	Baylor	1–3	George Washington	Field 7
Thu, November 20		Report		Stadium: Scheels Overland Park Soccer Complex; Overland Park, Kansas

11:30am CST	Central Michigan	3–0	Northern Colorado	Field 8
Thu, November 20		Report		Stadium: Scheels Overland Park Soccer Complex; Overland Park, Kansas

4:45pm CST	Northern Colorado	0–1	Baylor	Field 1
Thu, November 20		Report		Stadium: Scheels Overland Park Soccer Complex; Overland Park, Kansas

4:45pm CST	George Washington	0–1	Central Michigan	Field 2
Thu, November 20		Report		Stadium: Scheels Overland Park Soccer Complex; Overland Park, Kansas

9:45am CST	Baylor	2–0	Central Michigan	Field 9
Fri, November 21		Report		Stadium: Scheels Overland Park Soccer Complex; Overland Park, Kansas

9:45am CST	Northern Colorado	0–2	George Washington	Field 10
Fri, November 21		Report		Stadium: Scheels Overland Park Soccer Complex; Overland Park, Kansas

Group E
Pos	Team	Pld	W	D	L	GF	GA	GD	Pts	Qualification
1	Boston College	3	2	1	0	5	0	+5	7	Advanced to knockout stage
2	Michigan State "White"	3	2	1	0	2	0	+2	7	Advanced to knockout stage
3	Oregon State	3	1	0	2	2	3	−1	3	
4	Alabama	4	0	0	3	1	7	−6	0	

Scores

1:15pm CST	Oregon State	2–1	Alabama	Field 9
Thu, November 20		Report		Stadium: Scheels Overland Park Soccer Complex; Overland Park, Kansas

1:15pm CST	Boston College	0–0	Michigan State "White"	Field 10
Thu, November 20		Report		Stadium: Scheels Overland Park Soccer Complex; Overland Park, Kansas

8:15pm CST	Michigan State "White"	1–0	Oregon State	Field 9
Thu, November 20		Report		Stadium: Scheels Overland Park Soccer Complex; Overland Park, Kansas

8:15pm CST	Alabama	0–4	Boston College	Field 10
Thu, November 20		Report		Stadium: Scheels Overland Park Soccer Complex; Overland Park, Kansas

9:45am CST	Oregon State	0–1	Boston College	Field 12
Fri, November 21		Report		Stadium: Scheels Overland Park Soccer Complex; Overland Park, Kansas

9:45am CST	Michigan State "White"	1–0	Alabama	Field 6
Fri, November 21		Report		Stadium: Scheels Overland Park Soccer Complex; Overland Park, Kansas

Group F
Pos	Team	Pld	W	D	L	GF	GA	GD	Pts	Qualification
1	Purdue	3	3	0	0	11	0	+11	9	Advanced to knockout stage
2	USC	3	2	0	1	6	5	+1	6	
3	Iowa State	3	1	0	2	2	6	−4	3	
4	Springfield	3	0	0	3	1	9	−8	0	

Scores

1:15pm CST	USC	0–4	Purdue	Field 11
Thu, November 20		Report		Stadium: Scheels Overland Park Soccer Complex; Overland Park, Kansas

1:15pm CST	Iowa State	2–0	Springfield	Field 12
Thu, November 20		Report		Stadium: Scheels Overland Park Soccer Complex; Overland Park, Kansas

8:15pm CST	Springfield	1–5	USC	Field 11
Thu, November 20		Report		Stadium: Scheels Overland Park Soccer Complex; Overland Park, Kansas

8:15pm CST	Purdue	5–0	Iowa State	Field 12
Thu, November 20		Report		Stadium: Scheels Overland Park Soccer Complex; Overland Park, Kansas

9:45am CST	USC	1–0	Iowa State	Field 7
Fri, November 21		Report		Stadium: Scheels Overland Park Soccer Complex; Overland Park, Kansas

9:45am CST	Springfield	0–2	Purdue	Field 8
Fri, November 21		Report		Stadium: Scheels Overland Park Soccer Complex; Overland Park, Kansas

== Tournament bracket ==
=== Men's championship ===
Sweet 16
Fri • 12:30pm • Field 1
Michigan State	0
Arkansas	1
Fri • 12:30pm • Field 2
Virginia Tech	0
BYU	1
Fri • 12:30pm • Field 3
Texas	1
Virginia	0
Fri • 12:30pm • Field 4
Boston College	3
Illinois	2
Fri • 12:30pm • Field 5
UCLA	3
Auburn	1
Fri • 12:30pm • Field 6
Wisconsin	3
Rutgers	0
Fri • 12:30pm • Field 7
Colorado	2
Minnesota	0
Fri • 12:30pm • Field 8
Georgia Tech (pen.)	0 (4)
UCF	0 (3)

Quarterfinals
Fri • 7:30pm • Field 3
Arkansas	0
BYU	2
Fri • 7:30pm • Field 4
Texas	0
Boston College	1
Fri • 7:30pm • Field 1
UCLA (pen.)	1 (4)
Wisconsin	1 (1)
Fri • 7:30pm • Field 2
Colorado	2
Georgia Tech	1

Semifinals
Sat • 10:00am • Field 5
BYU	2
Boston College	1
Sat • 10:00am • Field 6
UCLA	2
Colorado	0

Final
Sat • 3:00pm • Field 1
BYU	1
UCLA	0

==== Men's consolation ====
Quarterfinals
Fri • 12:30pm • Field 9
Oregon	1 (2)
New Hampshire (pen.)	1 (4)
Fri • 12:30pm • Field 10
Saint Louis	1
Washington	2
Fri • 12:30pm • Field 11
Georgetown	2 (3)
Arizona State (pen.)	2 (4)
Fri • 12:30pm • Field 12
Texas A&M	4
Delaware	1

Semifinals
Sat • 8:00am • Field 5
New Hampshire (pen.)	1 (4)
Washington	1 (1)
Sat • 8:00am • Field 6
Arizona State	1
Texas A&M	2

Final
Sat • 12:30pm • Field 8
New Hampshire	0
Texas A&M	4

=== Women's championship ===
Sweet 16
Fri • 2:30pm • Field 1
Michigan State	3
Illinois	0
Fri • 2:30pm • Field 2
North Carolina	0
Texas	1
Fri • 2:30pm • Field 3
Brown	0
Missouri	1
Fri • 2:30pm • Field 4
Tennessee	3
WashU	0
Fri • 2:30pm • Field 5
Cornell (pen.)	0 (5)
Maryland	0 (3)
Fri • 2:30pm • Field 6
Michigan (pen.)	0 (4)
Ohio State	0 (1)
Fri • 2:30pm • Field 7
Syracuse	1 (5)
Colorado (pen.)	1 (6)
Fri • 2:30pm • Field 8
San Diego State	3
Auburn	1

Quarterfinals
Fri • 7:30pm • Field 7
Michigan State	1
Texas	0
Fri • 7:30pm • Field 8
Missouri	1 (4)
Tennessee (pen.)	1 (5)
Fri • 7:30pm • Field 5
Cornell	1
Michigan	0
Fri • 7:30pm • Field 6
Colorado	1 (3)
San Diego State (pen.)	1 (5)

Semifinals
Sat • 10:00am • Field 8
Michigan State	2
Tennessee	1
Sat • 10:00am • Field 9
Cornell	0
San Diego State	2

Final
Sat • 5:00pm • Field 1
Michigan State (pen.)	0 (4)
San Diego State	0 (3)

==== Women's consolation ====
Quarterfinals
Fri • 2:30pm • Field 9
Grand Canyon	0
Wisconsin	2
Fri • 2:30pm • Field 10
Texas State	1 (3)
Utah (pen.)	1 (5)
Fri • 2:30pm • Field 11
Boise State	0
Virginia Tech	1
Fri • 2:30pm • Field 12
Texas A&M	2
Vanderbilt	0

Semifinals
Sat • 8:00am • Field 5
Wisconsin	3
Utah	0
Sat • 8:00am • Field 6
Virginia Tech	2
Texas A&M	0

Final
Sat • 12:30pm • Field 8
Wisconsin	0 (3)
Virginia Tech (pen.)	0 (4)

=== Men's open ===
Quarterfinals
Fri • 5:30pm • Field 1
Miami (OH)	2
San Diego State	3
Fri • 5:30pm • Field 2
Purdue	2
Kansas	0
Fri • 5:30pm • Field 3
Weber State	0
UC-Santa Barbara	2
Fri • 5:30pm • Field 4
Cal Poly	2
Quinnipiac	0

Semifinals
Sat • 8:00am • Field 1
San Diego State (pen.)	1 (3)
Purdue	1 (2)
Sat • 8:00am • Field 4
UC-Santa Barnara	0
Cal Poly	3

Final
Sat • 12:30pm • Field 3
San Diego State	0
Cal Poly	1

=== Women's open ===
Quarterfinals
Fri • 5:30pm • Field 5
Boston College	1
UC Davis	2
Fri • 5:30pm • Field 6
UCLA	2
Miami (OH)	0
Fri • 5:30pm • Field 7
Colorado "Black"	5
Central Michigan	0
Fri • 5:30pm • Field 8
Purdue (pen.)	0 (5)
Michigan State "White"	0 (4)

Semifinals
Sat • 8:00am • Field 2
UC Davis	1 (2)
UCLA (pen.)	1 (3)
Sat • 8:00am • Field 3
Colorado "Black"	0
Purdue	2

Final
Sat • 12:30pm • Field 4
UCLA	2
Purdue	0

== All-tournament teams ==
Key
MVP
Best goalkeeper

=== Men's championship ===
#	Name	Team
19	Brayden Gonder	BYU
1	Ryan McCloskey	UCLA
21	Max Magleby	BYU
20	Aaron Jolley	BYU
24	Ammon Oyler	BYU
19	Noah Walker	UCLA
3	Jacob Diaz	UCLA
13	Travis Caplan	UCLA
?	Christian Martins	Boston College
1	Charles Coughlin	Boston College
3	Alejandro Arellano Ramirez	Colorado
10	Oskar Bringle	Georgia Tech

=== Women's championship ===
#	Name	Team
1	Ally Maloney	Michigan State
	Emily Woods	Michigan State
11	Jenna Barbour	Michigan State
21	Lauren Carrico	Michigan State
24	Gabriela Alvarez	San Diego State
	Darby Rogers	San Diego State
	Alicia Ugaz	San Diego State
26	Ella Shapiro	San Diego State
14	Isabella Rocque	Tennessee
	Bridgette Martin	Cornell
28	Hannah Mekky	Cornell
22	Lilly Van Wagenen	Cornell

=== Men's open ===
Name	Team
Zachary Preucil	Cal Poly
Lucas Summers	Cal Poly
Duncan Hawe	Cal Poly
Johnathan Roth	Cal Poly
Beckett Heynan	Cal Poly
Denys Kovalenko	Cal Poly
Riley Franco	San Diego State
Jesse Nunez	San Diego State
Rocco Villarreal	San Diego State
Lucas Summers	San Diego State
Sawyer Rice	UC-Santa Barbara
Zachary Ahmed	Miami (OH)

=== Women's open ===
#	Name	Team
	May Lu	UCLA
	Gabby Loughran	UCLA
	Mariam Yusuf	UCLA
	Kaella Chin	UCLA
	Payton Lucitt	Purdue
	Samantha Pullins	Purdue
	Anna Lindsey	Purdue
	Kiara Jumenez-Fuentes	Purdue
	Madeline Coles	UC Davis
	Lilyana Webb	Colorado
	Megan Twomey	Colorado
	Madison Poe	Colorado
