= 2022 NIRSA National Soccer Championship =

- League: NIRSA
- Sport: Soccer
- Site: Round Rock Multipurpose Complex; Round Rock, Texas
- Duration: November 17–19, 2022
- Teams: 96 total (24 per division)
- Results: Official Results

Men's Championship Division
- Score: 2–1
- Champion: BYU (9th title, 10th title game)
- Runners-up: Minnesota (1st title game)
- Season MVP: Thys Call (BYU)

Women's Championship Division
- Score: 1–0
- Champion: Cal Poly (1st title, 2nd title game)
- Runners-up: UConn (1st title game)
- Season MVP: Fiona Plunkett (Cal Poly)

Men's Open Division
- Score: 3–0
- Champion: UCLA (2nd title, 3rd title game)
- Runners-up: Miami (OH) (1st title game)
- Season MVP: Ciaran Hernon (UCLA)

Women's Open Division
- Score: 1–0
- Champion: UCLA (3rd title, 4th title game)
- Runners-up: Kansas (3rd title game)
- Top seed: Alison Shea (UCLA)

NIRSA national soccer championships seasons
- ← 2021 2023

The 2022 NIRSA national soccer championship was the 28th NIRSA National Soccer Championships, the annual national championships for United States-based, collegiate club soccer teams organized by NIRSA. It took place at the Round Rock Multipurpose Complex, in Round Rock, Texas from Thursday, November 17 to Saturday, November 19, 2022. This was the second time the event was held here, the first being in 2019.

== Overview ==
=== Men's championship ===
In the finals, the reigning back-back-back champions, BYU, were making their 10th finals appearance against finals debutants Minnesota. Prior to this, in the group stage, BYU would defeat Rutgers 6–0 then 2004 national champions, Texas A&M, 4–1 while Minnesota would defeat 2012 national champions, Michigan State, 3–0 then region II tournament runners-up, William & Mary, 4–0 to top their group.

In the knockout round, BYU would defeat 2008 national runners-up, Colorado State, 6–0 in the round of 16 then, in a rematch of the 2019 national championship game, would face Ohio State and beat them 3–0. Meanwhile, Minnesota would defeat region I tournament champion, UConn, 6–0 in the round of 16 then would beat 2015 national champion, North Carolina, 2–1 to advance to the semifinals. In the semifinals, in a rematch of last year's championship game, BYU would face Texas and would defeat them 4–1 to advance to their third straight finals while Minnesota would defeat UC-Davis 2–0 to advance to their first finals.

In the finals, with neither team trailing the entirety of the tournament, Minnesota would take an early lead with a goal from Samuel Yarmulnik in the first minute. They would hold this lead until Eric Morris of BYU leveled the game at 1–1 in the 67th minute. 2 minutes prior to the end of regulation, eventual MVP Thys Call of BYU would score what would be a game winner in a 2–1 victory for BYU, their 9th men's championship title and third consecutive. This was also their fourth title in the five iterations since they returned to NIRSA from the PDL.

=== Women's championship ===
In the finals, UConn would face 2011 runners-up Cal Poly. Prior to this, in the group stage, UConn would tie their opener 1–1 against region II tournament champion, Virginia, but a 1–0 win over Wisconsin would be enough to top their group. Meanwhile, Cal Poly would defeat Florida State 2–0 then would beat 2017 runners-up, Texas, 1–0 to also top their group.

In the knockout round, UConn would defeat UC-Davis 2–1 in the round of 16 then, after remaining deadlocked 1–1 after regulation and overtime would defeat 2005 national champion Michigan 5–4 in penalties to make their first semifinals. Meanwhile, Cal Poly would defeat Vanderbilt 1–0 in the round of 16 then would beat 2004 co-champion Colorado 2–1 in the quarterfinals. In the semifinals, UConn would defeat Oregon 2–0 to advance to their first finals while Cal Poly would defeat 2019 champion, Ohio State, 2–1 to advance to their second finals.

In the finals, the game would remain deadlocked 0–0 at the end of regulation, meaning a 15-minute, golden-goal period would occur. Two minutes before the end of the overtime period, Bethany Love of Cal Poly would head a cross off of a corner kick past the eventual women's championship's most outstanding goalkeeper, Estelle Jarrett of UConn, to give Cal Poly their first women's national title. Fiona Plunkett of Cal Poly would be named the MVP of the women's championship division.

=== Men's open ===
In the finals, UCLA, who were making their 3rd finals appearance in the last 4 iterations of the competition, would face Miami of Ohio, who were making their first ever open finals appearance. UCLA, led by captain and eventual MVP Ciaran Hernon, would go on to dominate 3–0 and claim their second men's open title.

=== Women's open ===
In the finals, Kansas were looking to claim their first national title against one of the division's most successful teams, UCLA who, despite their success in previous tournaments, finished second in their group. The game would be tied 0–0 at halftime, but a second half goal would be enough for UCLA to join their male counterparts and claim a 2022 open title. This was their third open title in their history and meant they had tied the record for most championships in the women’s open division, going level with JMU who have also won 3 titles. UCLA would also see their own Alison Shea be named the MVP of the women's open division.

== Format ==
The competition consisted of 96 teams: 48 men's teams and 48 women's teams. Each of these divisions were further divided into two 24-team divisions: the championship and open. The championship division divided teams into eight groups of three while the open division divided teams into six groups of four, both engaging in a round-robin tournament that determined teams able to advance to a knockout stage. Pool play games were two 40-minute halves, separated by a seven-minute halftime and utilized the three points for a win system. In the championship division, the two highest ranked teams from each group advanced to their knockout stage, with the third placed team advancing to a consolation bracket. In the open division, the top team from each group as well as the two best second placed teams advanced to their knockout stage.

Tie-breaking criteria for group play
The ranking of teams in each group was based on the following criteria in order:
1. Highest number of points
2. Winner of head-to-head competition
3. Greatest goal difference
  - Maximum ± 5 goal difference per match
4. Most goals scored
5. Most shutouts

In a tie breaking scenario involving more than 2 teams, the tiebreaker procedure would begin. If one team is identified as different and both remaining teams are still tied, the tie breaker procedure is restarted.

If a tie still remained after the first 5 criteria, the following was used to break a tie:

1. NCAA kicks from the mark
  - If there was a three-way tie, a coin-flip would be conducted. The two teams that chose the same outcome would compete in kicks from the mark between each other. The winner would compete with the last remaining team in kicks from the mark
  - If there's a four-way tie, a drawing of lots would be conducted (only could occur in open division)

Knockout stage games also consisted of two 40-minute halves. The round of 16 and quarterfinals were separated by a seven-minute halftime while the semifinals and finals had a ten minute halftime. Knockout stage games needed to declare a winner. If a knockout-stage game was tied at the end of regulation, overtime would begin. Overtime consisted of one, 15-minute, golden-goal period. If still tied after overtime, kicks from the mark would determine the winner.

== Qualification and selections ==
Each of the six regions receives three automatic bids for both the men's and women's championship that they award to its members. The final six bids are considered "at-large", and are given out by NIRSA to teams, typically based on the regional tournament results and RPI.

The 48 remaining teams participating in the open division were selected via a lottery draw that aired on YouTube on October 6, 2022 at 8am PST. Any team with membership in a NIRSA-affiliated league or with a minimum of four games played prior to the tournament were able to enter their name into the lottery. If a selected team qualified for the championship division, an alternate would take their spot. 54 men's teams and 56 women's were selected.

=== Men's championship ===
Automatic bid
Region	Method	Team	Appearance	Last Bid
I	Tournament; Co-champ	UConn	6th	2021
I	Tournament; Co-champ	Delaware	14th	2019
I	Highest RPI of remaining teams	Rutgers	1st	Never
II	Tournament; Champion	North Carolina	17th	2021
II	Highest RPI remaining teams	Clemson	5th	2003
II	2nd highest RPI of remaining teams	William & Mary	1st	Never
III	Tournament; Co-champ	Ohio State	15th	2019
III	Tournament; Co-champ	Notre Dame	2nd	2021
III	Highest RPI of remaining teams	Illinois	16th	2018
IV	Group A Winner	Texas Tech	11th	2021
IV	Group B Winner	Texas	21st	2021
IV	Group C Winner	Texas A&M	21st	2021
V	Pool A Winner	Minnesota	17th	2021
V	Pool B Winner	Colorado	20th	2021
V	3rd Place; Qualifier Winner	Colorado State	23rd	2021
VI	North Tournament; Champion	BYU	12th	2021
VI	South Tournament; Champion	USC	4th	2019
VI	South Tournament; Runners-up	UC-Davis	4th	2021

At-large bids
Region	Team	Appearance	Last Bid
I	Georgetown	1st	Never
II	JMU	4th	2021
II	Florida	14th	2019
III	Wisiconsin	7th	2021
III	Michigan State	13th	2019
VI	Weber State	15th	2015

=== Women's championship ===
Automatic bids
Region	Method	Team	Appearance	Last Bid
I	Tournament; Co-champion	Boston College	6th	2021
I	Tournament; Co-champion	Penn State	24th	2021
I	Highest RPI of remaining teams	UConn	4th	2019
II	Tournament; Champion	Virginia	12th	2021
II	Highest RPI of remaining teams	Vanderbilt	1st	Never
II	2nd highest RPI of remaining teams	Virginia Tech	17th	2019
III	Tournament; Co-champion	Cincinnati	1st	Never
III	Tournament; Co-champion	Michigan State	15th	2018
III	Highest RPI of remaining teams	Wisconsin	6th	2021
IV	Group A Winner	Baylor	11th	2021
IV	Group B Winner	Wash U St Louis	5th	2018
IV	Group C Winner	Texas	21st	2019
V	Pool A Winner	Colorado State	25th	2021
V	Pool B Winner	Minnesota	3rd	2021
V	3rd Place; Qualifier Winner	Colorado	27th	2021
VI	North Tournament; Champion	Oregon	2nd	2014
VI	South Tournament; Champion	Cal Poly	10th	2021
VI	South Tournament; Runners-up	UC-Santa Barbara	21st	2021

At-large bids
Region	Team	Appearance	Last Bid
II	Florida State	4th	2016
II	Georgia Tech	2nd	2021
III	Michigan	20th	2019
III	Ohio State	21st	2021
IV	Texas A&M	21st	2021
VI	UC-Davis	6th	2021

=== Men's lottery selection ===
Full men's lottery selections
Region	Team	Selection Type	Bid result
I	UMass Amherst	Automatic	Accepted
I	Babson	Automatic	Accepted
I	Penn	Automatic	Accepted
I	Cornell	Automatic	Accepted
I	Springfield	Waitlist	Not given
I	Stony Brook	Waitlist	Not given
I	UConn	Waitlist	Championship
I	Temple	Waitlist	Not given
I	New Haven	Waitlist	Not given
I	Vermont	Waitlist	Not given
I	Yale	Waitlist	Not given
I	Boston U.	Waitlist	Not given
I	Penn State	Waitlist	Not given
I	Boston College	Waitlist	Not given
I	Quinnipiac	Waitlist	Not given
I	Towson	Waitlist	Not given
I	Carnegie Mellon	Waitlist	Not given
I	Fordham	Waitlist	Not given
I	Connecticut College	Waitlist	Not given
I	Johns Hopkins	Waitlist	Not given
I	Northeastern	Waitlist	Not given
I	UMBC	Waitlist	Not given
I	Adelphi	Waitlist	Not given
II	Tampa	Automatic	Accepted
II	Virginia Tech	Automatic	Accepted
II	Florida Gulf Coast	Automatic	Accepted
II	VCU	Automatic	Accepted
II	JMU	Waitlist	Championship
III	Cincinnati	Automatic	Accepted
III	Miami (OH)	Automatic	Accepted
III	Ohio State	Automatic	Championship
III	Purdue	Automatic	Accepted
III	Illinois	Waitlist	Championship
III	Ohio U.	Waitlist	Not given
III	Kent State	Waitlist	Not given
III	Xavier	Waitlist	Not given
III	Grand Valley State	Waitlist	Not given
III	Michigan	Waitlist	Not given
IV	Kansas	Automatic	Accepted
IV	LSU	Automatic	Accepted
IV	Oklahoma State	Automatic	Not accepted
IV	Texas	Automatic	Accepted
IV	Missouri	Waitlist	Accepted from waitlist
V	Iowa State	Automatic	Accepted
V	Colorado College	Automatic	Accepted
V	Utah Valley State	Automatic	Accepted
V	Colorado	Automatic	Accepted
V	Minnesota	Waitlist	Accepted from waitlist
V	Arizona	Waitlist	Not given
VI	Cal Berkeley	Automatic	Accepted
VI	Oregon	Automatic	Accepted
VI	Cal Poly	Automatic	Accepted
VI	UCLA	Automatic	Accepted
VI	Boise State	Waitlist	Not given

Participating men's lottery teams
Region	Team	Selection Type	Bid result
I	UMass Amherst	Automatic	Accepted
I	Babson	Automatic	Accepted
I	Penn	Automatic	Accepted
I	Cornell	Automatic	Accepted
II	Tampa	Automatic	Accepted
II	Virginia Tech	Automatic	Accepted
II	Florida Gulf Coast	Automatic	Accepted
II	VCU	Automatic	Accepted
III	Cincinnati	Automatic	Accepted
III	Miami (OH)	Automatic	Accepted
III	Purdue	Automatic	Accepted
IV	Kansas	Automatic	Accepted
IV	LSU	Automatic	Accepted
IV	Texas	Automatic	Accepted
IV	Missouri	Waitlist	Accepted from waitlist
V	Iowa State	Automatic	Accepted
V	Colorado College	Automatic	Accepted
V	Utah Valley State	Automatic	Accepted
V	Colorado	Automatic	Accepted
V	Minnesota	Waitlist	Accepted from waitlist
VI	UC-Berkeley	Automatic	Accepted
VI	Oregon	Automatic	Accepted
VI	Cal Poly	Automatic	Accepted
VI	UCLA	Automatic	Accepted

=== Women's lottery selection ===
Full women's lottery selections
Region	Team	Selection Type	Bid result
I	Penn	Automatic	Accepted
I	Vermont	Automatic	Accepted
I	UMass Amherst	Automatic	Accepted
I	Cornell	Automatic	Accepted
I	UConn	Waitlist	Championship
I	Penn State	Waitlist	Championship
I	Northeastern	Waitlist	Not given
I	Quinnipiac	Waitlist	Not given
I	Towson	Waitlist	Not given
I	Boston College	Waitlist	Championship
I	Fordham	Waitlist	Not given
I	Syracuse	Waitlist	Not given
I	Springfield College	Waitlist	Not given
II	Miami	Automatic	Accepted
II	UCF	Automatic	Accepted
II	Georgia Southern	Automatic	Accepted
II	William & Mary	Automatic	Not accepted
II	JMU	Waitlist	Accepted from waitlist
II	Tampa	Waitlist	Not given
II	East Carolina	Waitlist	Not given
II	Virginia Tech	Waitlist	Championship
II	FAU	Waitlist	Not given
III	Central Michigan	Automatic	Not accepted
III	Dayton	Automatic	Not accepted
III	Cincinnati	Automatic	Championship
III	Butler	Automatic	Not accepted
III	Notre Dame	Waitlist	Accepted from waitlist
III	Grand Valley State	Waitlist	Accepted from waitlist
III	Purdue	Waitlist	Accepted from waitlist
III	Illinois	Waitlist	Accepted from waitlist
III	Miami (OH)	Waitlist	Not given
III	Western Michigan	Waitlist	Not given
III	Xavier	Waitlist	Not given
IV	Arkansas	Automatic	Accepted
IV	Kansas	Automatic	Accepted
IV	Kansas State	Automatic	Accepted
IV	Missouri	Automatic	Accepted
IV	Oklahoma State	Waitlist	Not given
IV	Texas Tech	Waitlist	Not given
IV	New Mexico	Waitlist	Not given
IV	Baylor	Waitlist	Not given
V	Air Force	Automatic	Not accepted
V	Colorado State	Automatic	Not accepted
V	Colorado	Automatic	Accepted
V	Iowa State	Automatic	Accepted
V	Northern Colorado	Waitlist	Accepted from waitlist
V	Colorado Mines	Waitlist	Accepted from waitlist
V	Minnesota	Waitlist	Championship
VI	Oregon	Automatic	Championship
VI	UC Berkeley	Automatic	Accepted
VI	Arizona	Automatic	Accepted
VI	Boise State	Automatic	Accepted
VI	UCLA	Waitlist	Accepted from waitlist
VI	UC Santa Barbara	Waitlist	Championship
VI	USC	Waitlist	Not given
VI	Montana State	Waitlist	Not given

Participating women's open teams
Region	Team	Selection Type	Bid result
I	Penn	Automatic	Accepted
I	Vermont	Automatic	Accepted
I	UMass Amherst	Automatic	Accepted
I	Cornell	Automatic	Accepted
II	Miami	Automatic	Accepted
II	UCF	Automatic	Accepted
II	Georgia Southern	Automatic	Accepted
II	JMU	Waitlist	Accepted from waitlist
III	Notre Dame	Waitlist	Accepted from waitlist
III	Grand Valley State	Waitlist	Accepted from waitlist
III	Purdue	Waitlist	Accepted from waitlist
III	Illinois	Waitlist	Accepted from waitlist
IV	Arkansas	Automatic	Accepted
IV	Kansas	Automatic	Accepted
IV	Kansas State	Automatic	Accepted
IV	Missouri	Automatic	Accepted
V	Colorado	Automatic	Accepted
V	Iowa State	Automatic	Accepted
V	Northern Colorado	Waitlist	Accepted from waitlist
V	Colorado Mines	Waitlist	Accepted from waitlist
VI	UC-Berkeley	Automatic	Accepted
VI	Arizona	Automatic	Accepted
VI	Boise State	Automatic	Accepted
VI	UCLA	Waitlist	Accepted from waitlist

== Group stage ==
Results from pool play from all 4 divisions:

Tie-breaking criteria for group play
The ranking of teams in each group was based on the following criteria in order:
1. Highest number of points
2. Winner of head-to-head competition
3. Greatest goal difference
  - Maximum ± 5 goal difference per match
4. Most goals scored
5. Most shutouts

In a tie breaking scenario involving more than 2 teams, the tiebreaker procedure would begin as normal. If one team is identified as different and both remaining teams are still tied, the tie breaker procedure is restarted.

If a tie still remained after the first 5 criteria, the following was used to break a tie:

1. NCAA kicks from the mark
  - If there was a three-way tie, a coin-flip would be conducted. The two teams that chose the same outcome would compete in kicks from the mark between each other. The winner would compete with the last remaining team in kicks from the mark
  - If there's a four-way tie, a drawing of lots would be conducted (only could occur in open division)

=== Men's championship ===
Group A
Pos	Team	Pld	W	D	L	GF	GA	GD	Pts	Qualification
1	BYU	2	2	0	0	10	1	+8 (Note: Actual GD differs because the max GD for any one game is ±5, which came into effect when BYU beat Rutgers 6–0)	6	Advanced to knockout stage
2	Texas A&M	2	1	0	1	3	4	−1	3	Advanced to knockout stage
3	Rutgers	2	0	0	2	0	8	−7	0	Consolation

Notes:

Scores

8:00am CST	BYU	6–0	Rutgers	Field 3
Thu, November 17		Report		Stadium: Round Rock Multipurpose Complex; Round Rock, Texas

12:45pm CST	Rutgers	0–2	Texas A&M	Field 5
Thu, November 17		Report		Stadium: Round Rock Multipurpose Complex; Round Rock, Texas

5:30pm CST	Texas A&M	1–4	BYU	Field 4
Thu, November 17		Report		Stadium: Round Rock Multipurpose Complex; Round Rock, Texas

Group B
Pos	Team	Pld	W	D	L	GF	GA	GD	Pts	Qualification
1	Texas	2	2	0	0	8	5	+3	6	Advanced to knockout stage
2	Wisconsin	2	1	0	1	3	3	0	3	Advanced to knockout stage
3	Colorado	2	0	0	2	3	6	−3	0	Consolation

Scores

8:00am CST	Texas	3–2	Wisconsin	Field 4
Thu, November 17		Report		Stadium: Round Rock Multipurpose Complex; Round Rock, Texas

12:45pm CST	Wisconsin	1–0	Colorado	Field 6
Thu, November 17		Report		Stadium: Round Rock Multipurpose Complex; Round Rock, Texas

5:30pm CST	Colorado	3–5	Texas	Field 3
Thu, November 17		Report		Stadium: Round Rock Multipurpose Complex; Round Rock, Texas

Group C
Pos	Team	Pld	W	D	L	GF	GA	GD	Pts	Qualification
1	North Carolina	2	2	0	0	7	1	+6	6	Advanced to knockout stage
2	Weber State	2	1	0	1	4	5	−1	3	Advanced to knockout stage
3	Delaware	2	0	0	2	1	6	−5	0	Consolation

Scores

8:00am CST	North Carolina	4–1	Weber State	Field 5
Thu, November 17		Report		Stadium: Round Rock Multipurpose Complex; Round Rock, Texas

12:45pm CST	Weber State	3–1	Delaware	Field 3
Thu, November 17		Report		Stadium: Round Rock Multipurpose Complex; Round Rock, Texas

5:30pm CST	Delaware	0–3	North Carolina	Field 6
Thu, November 17		Report		Stadium: Round Rock Multipurpose Complex; Round Rock, Texas

Group D
Pos	Team	Pld	W	D	L	GF	GA	GD	Pts	Qualification
1	Illinois	2	1	1	0	2	1	+1	4	Advanced to knockout stage
2	Colorado State	2	1	0	1	1	1	0	3	Advanced to knockout stage
3	S. California (USC)	2	0	1	1	1	2	−1	1	Consolation

Scores

8:00am CST	Illinois	1–0	Colorado State	Field 6
Thu, November 17		Report		Stadium: Round Rock Multipurpose Complex; Round Rock, Texas

12:45pm CST	Colorado State	1–0	USC	Field 4
Thu, November 17		Report		Stadium: Round Rock Multipurpose Complex; Round Rock, Texas

5:30pm CST	USC	1–1	Illinois	Field 5
Thu, November 17		Report		Stadium: Round Rock Multipurpose Complex; Round Rock, Texas

Group E
Pos	Team	Pld	W	D	L	GF	GA	GD	Pts	Qualification
1	UC-Davis	2	1	1	0	3	1	+2	4	Advanced to knockout stage
2	Ohio State	2	0	2	0	3	3	0	2	Advanced to knockout stage
3	JMU	2	0	1	1	2	4	−2	1	Consolation

Scores

9:35am CST	Ohio State	2–2	JMU	Field 3
Thu, November 17		Report		Stadium: Round Rock Multipurpose Complex; Round Rock, Texas

2:20pm CST	JMU	0–2	UC-Davis	Field 5
Thu, November 17		Report		Stadium: Round Rock Multipurpose Complex; Round Rock, Texas

7:05pm CST	UC-Davis	1–1	Ohio State	Field 4
Thu, November 17		Report		Stadium: Round Rock Multipurpose Complex; Round Rock, Texas

Group F
Pos	Team	Pld	W	D	L	GF	GA	GD	Pts	Qualification
1	Minnesota	2	2	0	0	7	0	+7	6	Advanced to knockout stage
2	Michigan State	2	0	1	1	2	5	−3	1 (Note: Tied on head-to-head result (MSU 2–2 W&M). Goal difference used to break tie)	Advanced to knockout stage
3	William & Mary	2	0	1	1	2	6	−4	1	Consolation

Notes:

Scores

9:35am CST	Minnesota	3–0	Michigan State	Field 4
Thu, November 17		Report		Stadium: Round Rock Multipurpose Complex; Round Rock, Texas

2:20pm CST	Michigan State	2–2	William & Mary	Field 6
Thu, November 17		Report		Stadium: Round Rock Multipurpose Complex; Round Rock, Texas

7:05pm CST	William & Mary	0–4	Minnesota	Field 3
Thu, November 17		Report		Stadium: Round Rock Multipurpose Complex; Round Rock, Texas

Group G
Pos	Team	Pld	W	D	L	GF	GA	GD	Pts	Qualification
1	Texas Tech	2	1	1	0	3	2	+1	4	Advanced to knockout stage
2	UConn	2	1	0	1	2	2	0	3	Advanced to knockout stage
3	Florida	2	0	1	1	1	2	−1	1	Consolation

Scores

9:35am CST	UConn	1–0	Florida	Field 5
Thu, November 17		Report		Stadium: Round Rock Multipurpose Complex; Round Rock, Texas

2:20pm CST	Florida	1–1	Texas Tech	Field 3
Thu, November 17		Report		Stadium: Round Rock Multipurpose Complex; Round Rock, Texas

7:05pm CST	Texas Tech	2–1	UConn	Field 6
Thu, November 17		Report		Stadium: Round Rock Multipurpose Complex; Round Rock, Texas

Group H
Pos	Team	Pld	W	D	L	GF	GA	GD	Pts	Qualification
1	Notre Dame	2	1	1	0	2	1	+1	4	Advanced to knockout stage
2	Georgetown	2	1	0	1	2	2	0	3	Advanced to knockout stage
3	Clemson	2	0	1	1	2	3	−1	1	Consolation

Scores

9:35am CST	Clemson	1–2	Georgetown	Field 6
Thu, November 17		Report		Stadium: Round Rock Multipurpose Complex; Round Rock, Texas

2:20pm CST	Georgetown	0–1	Notre Dame	Field 4
Thu, November 17		Report		Stadium: Round Rock Multipurpose Complex; Round Rock, Texas

7:05pm CST	Notre Dame	1–1	Clemson	Field 5
Thu, November 17		Report		Stadium: Round Rock Multipurpose Complex; Round Rock, Texas

=== Women's championship ===
Group A
Pos	Team	Pld	W	D	L	GF	GA	GD	Pts	Qualification
1	Michigan State	2	1	1	0	2	1	+1	4 (Note: Tied on head-to-head result (MSU 0–0 CU). Tied on goal difference (+1). Total goals for used to break tie)	Advanced to knockout stage
2	Colorado	2	1	1	0	1	0	+1	4	Advanced to knockout stage
3	Georgia Tech	2	0	0	2	1	3	−2	0	Consolation

Notes:

Scores

8:00am CST	Michigan State	0–0	Colorado	Field 7
Thu, November 17		Report		Stadium: Round Rock Multipurpose Complex; Round Rock, Texas

12:45pm CST	Colorado	1–0	Georgia Tech	Field 9
Thu, November 17		Report		Stadium: Round Rock Multipurpose Complex; Round Rock, Texas

5:30pm CST	Georgia Tech	1–2	Michigan State	Field 8
Thu, November 17		Report		Stadium: Round Rock Multipurpose Complex; Round Rock, Texas

Group B
Pos	Team	Pld	W	D	L	GF	GA	GD	Pts	Qualification
1	UConn	2	1	1	0	2	1	+1	4	Advanced to knockout stage
2	Wisconsin	2	1	0	1	3	1	+2	3	Advanced to knockout stage
3	Virginia	2	0	1	1	1	4	−3	1	Consolation

Scores

8:00am CST	Virginia	1–1	UConn	Field 8
Thu, November 17		Report		Stadium: Round Rock Multipurpose Complex; Round Rock, Texas

12:45pm CST	UConn	1–0	Wisconsin	Field 10
Thu, November 17		Report		Stadium: Round Rock Multipurpose Complex; Round Rock, Texas

5:30pm CST	Wisconsin	3–0	Virginia	Field 7
Thu, November 17		Report		Stadium: Round Rock Multipurpose Complex; Round Rock, Texas

Group C
Pos	Team	Pld	W	D	L	GF	GA	GD	Pts	Qualification
1	Ohio State	2	1	1	0	3	2	+1	4	Advanced to knockout stage
2	UC-Davis	2	0	2	0	2	2	0	2	Advanced to knockout stage
3	Boston College	2	0	1	1	0	1	−1	1	Consolation

Scores

8:00am CST	Boston College	0–1	Ohio State	Field 9
Thu, November 17		Report		Stadium: Round Rock Multipurpose Complex; Round Rock, Texas

12:45pm CST	Ohio State	2–2	UC-Davis	Field 7
Thu, November 17		Report		Stadium: Round Rock Multipurpose Complex; Round Rock, Texas

5:30pm CST	UC-Davis	0–0	Boston College	Field 10
Thu, November 17		Report		Stadium: Round Rock Multipurpose Complex; Round Rock, Texas

Group D
Pos	Team	Pld	W	D	L	GF	GA	GD	Pts	Qualification
1	UC-Santa Barbara	2	1	1	0	2	0	+2	4	Advanced to knockout stage
2	Wash U St. Louis	2	1	0	1	2	2	0	3	Advanced to knockout stage
3	Penn State	2	0	1	1	0	2	−2	1	Consolation

Scores

8:00am CST	Penn State	0–0	UC-Santa Barbara	Field 10
Thu, November 17		Report		Stadium: Round Rock Multipurpose Complex; Round Rock, Texas

12:45pm CST	UC-Santa Barbara	2–0	Wash U	Field 8
Thu, November 17		Report		Stadium: Round Rock Multipurpose Complex; Round Rock, Texas

5:30pm CST	Wash U	2–0	Penn State	Field 9
Thu, November 17		Report		Stadium: Round Rock Multipurpose Complex; Round Rock, Texas

Group E
Pos	Team	Pld	W	D	L	GF	GA	GD	Pts	Qualification
1	Cal Poly	2	2	0	0	3	0	+3	6	Advanced to knockout stage
2	Texas	2	0	1	1	1	2	−1	1 (Note: Tied on head-to-head result (FSU 1–1 Texas). Goal difference used to break tie)	Advanced to knockout stage
3	Florida State	2	0	1	1	1	3	−2	1	Consolation

Notes:

Scores

9:35am CST	Cal Poly	2–0	Florida State	Field 7
Thu, November 17		Report		Stadium: Round Rock Multipurpose Complex; Round Rock, Texas

2:20pm CST	Florida State	1–1	Texas	Field 9
Thu, November 17		Report		Stadium: Round Rock Multipurpose Complex; Round Rock, Texas

7:05pm CST	Texas	0–1	Cal Poly	Field 8
Thu, November 17		Report		Stadium: Round Rock Multipurpose Complex; Round Rock, Texas

Group F
Pos	Team	Pld	W	D	L	GF	GA	GD	Pts	Qualification
1	Cincinnati	2	1	1	0	2	1	+1	4	Advanced to knockout stage
2	Virginia Tech	2	1	0	1	1	1	0	3	Advanced to knockout stage
3	Texas A&M	2	0	1	1	1	2	−1	1	Consolation

Scores

9:35am CST	Virginia Tech	1–0	Texas A&M	Field 8
Thu, November 17		Report		Stadium: Round Rock Multipurpose Complex; Round Rock, Texas

2:20pm CST	Texas A&M	1–1	Cincinnati	Field 10
Thu, November 17		Report		Stadium: Round Rock Multipurpose Complex; Round Rock, Texas

7:05pm CST	Cincinnati	1–0	Virginia Tech	Field 7
Thu, November 17		Report		Stadium: Round Rock Multipurpose Complex; Round Rock, Texas

Group G
Pos	Team	Pld	W	D	L	GF	GA	GD	Pts	Qualification
1	Michigan	2	2	0	0	3	1	+2	6	Advanced to knockout stage
2	Minnesota	2	1	0	1	3	2	+1	3	Advanced to knockout stage
3	Baylor	2	0	0	2	0	3	−3	0	Consolation

Scores

9:35am CST	Minnesota	1–2	Michigan	Field 9
Thu, November 17		Report		Stadium: Round Rock Multipurpose Complex; Round Rock, Texas

2:20pm CST	Michigan	1–0	Baylor	Field 7
Thu, November 17		Report		Stadium: Round Rock Multipurpose Complex; Round Rock, Texas

7:05pm CST	Baylor	0–2	Minnesota	Field 10
Thu, November 17		Report		Stadium: Round Rock Multipurpose Complex; Round Rock, Texas

Group H
Pos	Team	Pld	W	D	L	GF	GA	GD	Pts	Qualification
1	Oregon	2	1	1	0	8	3	+5	4 (Note: Tied on head-to-head result (Oregon 2–2 Vandy). Goal difference used to break tie)	Advanced to knockout stage
2	Vanderbilt	2	1	1	0	3	2	+1	4	Advanced to knockout stage
3	Colorado State	2	0	0	2	1	7	−6	0	Consolation

Notes:

Scores

9:35am CST	Oregon	2–2	Vanderbilt	Field 10
Thu, November 17		Report		Stadium: Round Rock Multipurpose Complex; Round Rock, Texas

2:20pm CST	Vanderbilt	1–0	Colorado State	Field 8
Thu, November 17		Report		Stadium: Round Rock Multipurpose Complex; Round Rock, Texas

7:05pm CST	Colorado State	1–6	Oregon	Field 9
Thu, November 17		Report		Stadium: Round Rock Multipurpose Complex; Round Rock, Texas

=== Men's open ===
Group A
Pos	Team	Pld	W	D	L	GF	GA	GD	Pts	Qualification
1	Miami (OH)	3	2	1	0	10	3	+7	7 (Note: Tied on head-to-head result (VT 2–2 M-OH). Goal difference used to break tie)	Advanced to knockout stage
2	Virginia Tech	3	2	1	0	9	4	+5	7	Advanced to knockout stage
3	Kansas	3	1	0	2	2	5	−3	3	
4	Utah Valley	3	0	0	3	2	11	−9	0	

Notes:

Scores

12:30pm CST	Virginia Tech	2–2	Miami (OH)	Field NEM11
Thu, November 17		Report		Stadium: Round Rock Multipurpose Complex; Round Rock, Texas

12:30pm CST	Utah Valley	0–1	Kansas	Field NEM12
Thu, November 17		Report		Stadium: Round Rock Multipurpose Complex; Round Rock, Texas

8:40pm CST	Kansas	1–2	Virginia Tech	Field 1
Thu, November 17		Report		Stadium: Round Rock Multipurpose Complex; Round Rock, Texas

8:40pm CST	Miami (OH)	5–1	Utah Valley	Field 2
Thu, November 17		Report		Stadium: Round Rock Multipurpose Complex; Round Rock, Texas

10:45am CST	Virginia Tech	5–1	Utah Valley	Field NEM11
Fri, November 18		Report		Stadium: Round Rock Multipurpose Complex; Round Rock, Texas

10:45am CST	Kansas	0–3	Miami (OH)	Field NEM12
Fri, November 18		Report		Stadium: Round Rock Multipurpose Complex; Round Rock, Texas

Group B
Pos	Team	Pld	W	D	L	GF	GA	GD	Pts	Qualification
1	Cincinnati	3	3	0	0	14	3	+10 (Note: Actual GD differs because the max GD for any one game is ±5, which came into effect when Cincinnati beat Florida Gulf Coast 7–1)	9	Advanced to knockout stage
2	Cornell	3	1	1	1	9	6	+3	4 (Note: Tied on head-to-head result (UC-B 1–1 Cornell). Goal difference used to break tie)	
3	UC-Berkeley	3	1	1	1	12	6	+2 (Note: Actual GD differs because the max GD for any one game is ±5, which came into effect when UC-Berkeley beat Florida Gulf Coast 9–0)	4	
4	Florida Gulf Coast	3	0	0	3	4	24	−15	0	

Notes:

Scores

11:10am CST	Cincinnati	5–2	UC-Berkeley	Field 3
Thu, November 17		Report		Stadium: Round Rock Multipurpose Complex; Round Rock, Texas

11:10am CST	Cornell	8–3	Florida Gulf Coast	Field 1
Thu, November 17		Report		Stadium: Round Rock Multipurpose Complex; Round Rock, Texas

7:05pm CST	Florida Gulf Coast	1–7	Cincinnati	Field 1
Thu, November 17		Report		Stadium: Round Rock Multipurpose Complex; Round Rock, Texas

7:05pm CST	UC-Berkeley	1–1	Cornell	Field 2
Thu, November 17		Report		Stadium: Round Rock Multipurpose Complex; Round Rock, Texas

10:00am CST	Cincinnati	2–0	Cornell	Field 1
Fri, November 18		Report		Stadium: Round Rock Multipurpose Complex; Round Rock, Texas

10:00am CST	Florida Gulf Coast	0–9	UC-Berkeley	Field 2
Fri, November 18		Report		Stadium: Round Rock Multipurpose Complex; Round Rock, Texas

Group C
Pos	Team	Pld	W	D	L	GF	GA	GD	Pts	Qualification
1	Oregon	3	2	0	1	6	3	+3	6 (Note: Oregon won the head-to-head result over LSU 4–1)	Advanced to knockout stage
2	LSU	3	2	0	1	5	6	−1	6	
3	Penn	3	1	1	1	3	3	0	4	
4	Colorado "Black"	3	0	1	2	3	5	−2	1	

Notes:

Scores

12:30pm CST	Colorado "Black"	1–1	Penn	Field NEM13
Thu, November 17		Report		Stadium: Round Rock Multipurpose Complex; Round Rock, Texas

12:30pm CST	Oregon	4–1	LSU	Field NEM14
Thu, November 17		Report		Stadium: Round Rock Multipurpose Complex; Round Rock, Texas

8:40pm CST	LSU	2–1	Colorado "Black"	Field 3
Thu, November 17		Report		Stadium: Round Rock Multipurpose Complex; Round Rock, Texas

8:40pm CST	Penn	1–0	Oregon	Field 4
Thu, November 17		Report		Stadium: Round Rock Multipurpose Complex; Round Rock, Texas

1:00pm CST	Colorado "Black"	1–2	Oregon	Field 1
Fri, November 18		Report		Stadium: Round Rock Multipurpose Complex; Round Rock, Texas

1:00pm CST	LSU	2–1	Penn	Field 2
Fri, November 18		Report		Stadium: Round Rock Multipurpose Complex; Round Rock, Texas

Group D
Pos	Team	Pld	W	D	L	GF	GA	GD	Pts	Qualification
1	UCLA	3	3	0	0	10	1	+8 (Note: Actual GD differs because the max GD for any one game is ±5, which came into effect when UCLA beat Texas "B" 6–0)	9	Advanced to knockout stage
2	Purdue	3	2	0	1	9	3	+6	6	Advanced to knockout stage
3	Colorado College	3	1	0	2	1	5	−4	3	
4	Texas "B"	3	0	0	3	0	11	−10	0	

Notes:

Scores

12:45pm CST	Texas "B"	0–1	Colorado College	Field 1
Thu, November 17		Report		Stadium: Round Rock Multipurpose Complex; Round Rock, Texas

12:45pm CST	UCLA	3–1	Purdue	Field 2
Thu, November 17		Report		Stadium: Round Rock Multipurpose Complex; Round Rock, Texas

8:40pm CST	Pudue	4–0	Texas "B"	Field 5
Thu, November 17		Report		Stadium: Round Rock Multipurpose Complex; Round Rock, Texas

8:40pm CST	Colorado College	0–1	UCLA	Field 6
Thu, November 17		Report		Stadium: Round Rock Multipurpose Complex; Round Rock, Texas

10:45am CST	Texas "B"	0–6	UCLA	Field NEM13
Fri, November 18		Report		Stadium: Round Rock Multipurpose Complex; Round Rock, Texas

10:45am CST	Purdue	4–0	Colorado College	Field NEM14
Fri, November 18		Report		Stadium: Round Rock Multipurpose Complex; Round Rock, Texas

Group E
Pos	Team	Pld	W	D	L	GF	GA	GD	Pts	Qualification
1	Missouri	3	3	0	0	15	1	+13 (Note: Actual GD differs because the max GD for any one game is ±5, which came into effect when Missouri beat Iowa State 6–0)	9	Advanced to knockout stage
2	U Mass Amherst	3	1	0	2	3	5	−2	3 (Note: Tied on cumulative head-to-head results (Iowa State 2–1 UMass Amherst, VCU 4–1 Iowa State, UMass Amherst 2–0 VCU). Goal difference used to break ties)	
3	VCU	3	1	0	2	5	9	−4	3	
4	Iowa State	3	1	0	2	3	11	−7	3	

Notes:

Scores

2:15pm CST	Missouri	6–1	VCU	Field NEM11
Thu, November 17		Report		Stadium: Round Rock Multipurpose Complex; Round Rock, Texas

2:15pm CST	Iowa State	2–1	U Mass Amherst	Field NEM12
Thu, November 17		Report		Stadium: Round Rock Multipurpose Complex; Round Rock, Texas

8:40pm CST	U Mass Amherst	0–3	Missouri	Field 7
Thu, November 17		Report		Stadium: Round Rock Multipurpose Complex; Round Rock, Texas

8:40pm CST	VCU	4–1	Iowa State	Field 8
Thu, November 17		Report		Stadium: Round Rock Multipurpose Complex; Round Rock, Texas

12:30pm CST	Missouri	6–0	Iowa State	Field NEM11
Fri, November 18		Report		Stadium: Round Rock Multipurpose Complex; Round Rock, Texas

12:30pm CST	U Mass Amherst	2–0	VCU	Field NEM12
Fri, November 18		Report		Stadium: Round Rock Multipurpose Complex; Round Rock, Texas

Group F
Pos	Team	Pld	W	D	L	GF	GA	GD	Pts	Qualification
1	Cal Poly	3	3	0	0	6	1	+5	9	Advanced to knockout stage
2	Tampa	3	2	0	1	3	3	0	6	
3	Minnesota "B"	3	1	0	2	3	4	−1	3	
4	Babson	3	0	0	3	2	6	−4	0	

Scores

2:15pm CST	Cal Poly	1–0	Minnesota "B"	Field NEM13
Thu, November 17		Report		Stadium: Round Rock Multipurpose Complex; Round Rock, Texas

2:15pm CST	Tampa	1–0	Babson	Field NEM14
Thu, November 17		Report		Stadium: Round Rock Multipurpose Complex; Round Rock, Texas

8:40pm CST	Babson	1–3	Cal Poly	Field 9
Thu, November 17		Report		Stadium: Round Rock Multipurpose Complex; Round Rock, Texas

8:40pm CST	Minnesota "B"	1–2	Tampa	Field 10
Thu, November 17		Report		Stadium: Round Rock Multipurpose Complex; Round Rock, Texas

12:30pm CST	Cal Poly	2–0	Tampa	Field NEM13
Fri, November 18		Report		Stadium: Round Rock Multipurpose Complex; Round Rock, Texas

12:30pm CST	Babson	1–2	Minnesota "B"	Field NEM14
Fri, November 18		Report		Stadium: Round Rock Multipurpose Complex; Round Rock, Texas

=== Women's open ===
Group A
Pos	Team	Pld	W	D	L	GF	GA	GD	Pts	Qualification
1	Kansas	3	3	0	0	7	1	+6	9	Advanced to knockout stage
2	Arizona	3	2	0	1	6	4	+2	6	
3	Vermont	3	1	0	2	3	6	−3	3	
4	Grand Valley State	3	0	0	3	4	9	−5	0	

Scores

8:00am CST	Kansas	2–1	Grand Valley State	Field 1
Thu, November 17		Report		Stadium: Round Rock Multipurpose Complex; Round Rock, Texas

8:00am CST	Vermont	0–2	Arizona	Field 2
Thu, November 17		Report		Stadium: Round Rock Multipurpose Complex; Round Rock, Texas

2:20pm CST	Arizona	0–3	Kansas	Field 1
Thu, November 17		Report		Stadium: Round Rock Multipurpose Complex; Round Rock, Texas

2:20pm CST	Grand Valley State	2–3	Vermont	Field 2
Thu, November 17		Report		Stadium: Round Rock Multipurpose Complex; Round Rock, Texas

8:00am CST	Kansas	2–0	Vermont	Field 3
Fri, November 18		Report		Stadium: Round Rock Multipurpose Complex; Round Rock, Texas

8:00am CST	Arizona	4–1	Grand Valley State	Field 4
Fri, November 18		Report		Stadium: Round Rock Multipurpose Complex; Round Rock, Texas

Group B
Pos	Team	Pld	W	D	L	GF	GA	GD	Pts	Qualification
1	Purdue	3	2	0	1	6	2	+4	6	Advanced to knockout stage
2	U Mass Amherst	3	1	2	0	4	3	+1	5	
3	UC-Berkeley	3	1	1	1	4	5	−1	4	
4	Colorado Mines	3	0	1	2	2	6	−4	1	

Scores

9:00am CST	Colorado Mines	0–2	Purdue	Field NEM11
Thu, November 17		Report		Stadium: Round Rock Multipurpose Complex; Round Rock, Texas

9:00am CST	UC-Berkeley	1–1	U Mass Amherst	Field NEM12
Thu, November 17		Report		Stadium: Round Rock Multipurpose Complex; Round Rock, Texas

3:55pm CST	U Mass Amherst	1–1	Colorado Mines	Field 1
Thu, November 17		Report		Stadium: Round Rock Multipurpose Complex; Round Rock, Texas

3:55pm CST	Purdue	3–0	UC-Berkeley	Field 2
Thu, November 17		Report		Stadium: Round Rock Multipurpose Complex; Round Rock, Texas

8:00am CST	Colorado Mines	1–3	UC-Berkeley	Field 5
Fri, November 18		Report		Stadium: Round Rock Multipurpose Complex; Round Rock, Texas

8:00am CST	U Mass Amherst	2–1	Purdue	Field 6
Fri, November 18		Report		Stadium: Round Rock Multipurpose Complex; Round Rock, Texas

Group C
Pos	Team	Pld	W	D	L	GF	GA	GD	Pts	Qualification
1	Notre Dame	3	3	0	0	7	3	+4	9	Advanced to knockout stage
2	UCF	3	2	0	1	6	5	+1	6	
3	Colorado "Black"	3	1	0	2	3	5	−2	3	
4	Boise State	3	0	0	3	4	7	−3	0	

Scores

9:00am CST	Colorado "Black"	0–2	UCF	Field NEM13
Thu, November 17		Report		Stadium: Round Rock Multipurpose Complex; Round Rock, Texas

9:00am CST	Notre Dame	2–1	Boise State	Field NEM14
Thu, November 17		Report		Stadium: Round Rock Multipurpose Complex; Round Rock, Texas

3:55pm CST	Boise State	1–2	Colorado "Black"	Field 3
Thu, November 17		Report		Stadium: Round Rock Multipurpose Complex; Round Rock, Texas

3:55pm CST	UCF	1–3	Notre Dame	Field 4
Thu, November 17		Report		Stadium: Round Rock Multipurpose Complex; Round Rock, Texas

8:00am CST	Colorado "Black"	1–2	Notre Dame	Field 7
Fri, November 18		Report		Stadium: Round Rock Multipurpose Complex; Round Rock, Texas

8:00am CST	Boise State	2–3	UCF	Field 8
Fri, November 18		Report		Stadium: Round Rock Multipurpose Complex; Round Rock, Texas

Group D
Pos	Team	Pld	W	D	L	GF	GA	GD	Pts	Qualification
1	JMU	3	2	1	0	10	2	+6 (Note: Actual GD differs because the max GD for any one game is ±5, which came into effect when JMU beat K State 7–0)	7 (Note: Tied the head-to-head result (JMU 2–2 UCLA). Goal difference used to break tie)	Advanced to knockout stage
2	UCLA	3	2	1	0	7	2	+5	7	Advanced to knockout stage
3	Iowa State	3	0	1	2	1	3	−2	1 (Note: Tied the head-to-head result (Iowa State 1–1 Kansas State). Goal difference used to break tie)	
4	Kansas State	3	0	1	2	1	12	−9	1	

Notes:

Scores

9:35am CST	UCLA	1–0	Iowa State	Field 1
Thu, November 17		Report		Stadium: Round Rock Multipurpose Complex; Round Rock, Texas

9:35am CST	Kansas State	0–7	JMU	Field 2
Thu, November 17		Report		Stadium: Round Rock Multipurpose Complex; Round Rock, Texas

3:55pm CST	JMU	2–2	UCLA	Field 5
Thu, November 17		Report		Stadium: Round Rock Multipurpose Complex; Round Rock, Texas

3:55pm CST	Iowa State	1–1	Kansas State	Field 6
Thu, November 17		Report		Stadium: Round Rock Multipurpose Complex; Round Rock, Texas

8:00am CST	UCLA	4–0	Kansas State	Field 9
Fri, November 18		Report		Stadium: Round Rock Multipurpose Complex; Round Rock, Texas

8:00am CST	JMU	1–0	Iowa State	Field 10
Fri, November 18		Report		Stadium: Round Rock Multipurpose Complex; Round Rock, Texas

Group E
Pos	Team	Pld	W	D	L	GF	GA	GD	Pts	Qualification
1	Arkansas	3	2	1	0	3	1	+2	7	Advanced to knockout stage
2	Penn	3	2	0	1	12	2	+7 (Note: Actual GD differs because the max GD for any one game is ±5, which came into effect when Penn beat Georgia S. 8–0)	6	Advanced to knockout stage
3	Northern Colorado	3	0	2	1	2	6	−4	2	
4	Georgia Southern	3	0	1	2	2	10	−5	1	

Notes:

Scores

10:45am CST	Georgia Southern	1–1	Arkansas	Field NEM11
Thu, November 17		Report		Stadium: Round Rock Multipurpose Complex; Round Rock, Texas

10:45am CST	Penn	4–1	Northern Colorado	Field NEM12
Thu, November 17		Report		Stadium: Round Rock Multipurpose Complex; Round Rock, Texas

3:55pm CST	Northern Colorado	1–1	Georgia Southern	Field 7
Thu, November 17		Report		Stadium: Round Rock Multipurpose Complex; Round Rock, Texas

3:55pm CST	Arkansas	1–0	Penn	Field 8
Thu, November 17		Report		Stadium: Round Rock Multipurpose Complex; Round Rock, Texas

9:00am CST	Georgia Southern	0–8	Penn	Field NEM11
Fri, November 18		Report		Stadium: Round Rock Multipurpose Complex; Round Rock, Texas

9:00am CST	Northern Colorado	0–1	Arkansas	Field NEM12
Fri, November 18		Report		Stadium: Round Rock Multipurpose Complex; Round Rock, Texas

Group F
Pos	Team	Pld	W	D	L	GF	GA	GD	Pts	Qualification
1	Missouri	3	3	0	0	7	1	+6	9	Advanced to knockout stage
2	Illinois	3	2	0	1	9	2	+7	6	
3	Cornell	3	1	0	2	7	4	+1 (Note: Actual GD differs because the max GD for any one game is ±5, which came into effect when Cornell beat Miami 7–0)	3	
4	Miami	3	0	0	3	0	16	−14	0	

Notes:

Scores

10:45am CST	Illinois	3–0	Cornell	Field NEM13
Thu, November 17		Report		Stadium: Round Rock Multipurpose Complex; Round Rock, Texas

10:45am CST	Miami	0–4	Missouri	Field NEM14
Thu, November 17		Report		Stadium: Round Rock Multipurpose Complex; Round Rock, Texas

3:55pm CST	Missouri	2–1	Illinois	Field 9
Thu, November 17		Report		Stadium: Round Rock Multipurpose Complex; Round Rock, Texas

3:55pm CST	Cornell	7–0	Miami	Field 10
Thu, November 17		Report		Stadium: Round Rock Multipurpose Complex; Round Rock, Texas

9:00am CST	Illinois	5–0	Miami	Field NEM13
Thu, November 18		Report		Stadium: Round Rock Multipurpose Complex; Round Rock, Texas

9:00am CST	Missouri	1–0	Cornell	Field NEM14
Fri, November 18		Report		Stadium: Round Rock Multipurpose Complex; Round Rock, Texas

== Tournament bracket ==
=== Men's championship ===
Sweet 16
Fri • 10:00AM • Field 3
BYU	6
Colorado State	0
Fri • 10:00AM • Field 4
Notre Dame	0 (2)
Ohio State	0 (4)
Fri • 10:00AM • Field 5
Texas Tech	1
Michigan State (a.e.t.)	2
Fri • 10:00AM • Field 6
Texas	1 (4)
Weber State	1 (3)
Fri • 1:00PM • Field 3
North Carolina	1
Wisconsin	0
Fri • 1:00PM • Field 4
Minnesota	6
UConn	0
Fri • 1:00PM • Field 5
UC-Davis	2
Georgetown	0
Fri • 1:00PM • Field 6
Illinois	3
Texas A&M	0

Quarterfinals
Fri • 5:00PM • Field 5
BYU	3
Ohio State	0
Fri • 5:00PM • Field 6
Michigan State	0
Texas	1
Fri • 7:00PM • Field 5
North Carolina	1
Minnesota (a.e.t.)	2
Fri • 7:00PM • Field 6
UC-Davis	5
Illinois	0

Semifinals
Sat • 10:00AM • Field 9
BYU	4
Texas	1
Sat • 10:00AM • Field 10
Minnesota	2
UC-Davis	0

Final
Sat • 5:00PM • Field 1
BYU	2
Minnesota	1

==== Men's consolation ====
Quarterfinals
Fri • 3:00PM • Field 7
Rutgers	0
JMU	2
Fri • 3:00PM • Field 8
William & Mary	2
Colorado	1
Fri • 5:00PM • Field 7
Delaware	2
Florida	4
Fri • 5:00PM • Field 8
Clemson	0
USC	3

Semifinals
Sat • 8:00AM • Field 1
JMU	0
William & Mary	2
Sat • 8:00AM • Field 2
Florida	2
USC	3

Final
CANCELLED
William & Mary
USC

=== Women's championship ===
Sweet 16
Fri • 10:00AM • Field 7
Michigan State	5
Wash U St Louis	1
Fri • 10:00AM • Field 8
Oregon	1
Texas	0
Fri • 10:00AM • Field 9
Michigan	2
Virginia Tech	1
Fri • 10:00AM • Field 10
UConn	2
UC-Davis	1
Fri • 1:00PM • Field 7
Ohio State	3
Wisconsin	1
Fri • 1:00PM • Field 8
Cincinnati	1
Minnesota	0
Fri • 1:00PM • Field 9
Cal Poly	1
Vanderbilt	0
Fri • 1:00PM • Field 10
UC-Santa Barbara	0
Colorado	1

Quarterfinals
Fri • 5:00PM • Field 2
Michigan State	1 (0)
Oregon	1 (3)
Fri • 5:00PM • Field 4
Michigan	1 (4)
UConn	1 (5)
Fri • 7:00PM • Field 2
Ohio State	3
Cincinnati	0
Fri • 7:00PM • Field 4
Cal Poly	2
Colorado	1

Semifinals
Sat • 10:00AM • Field 7
Oregon	0
UConn	2
Sat • 10:00AM • Field 8
Ohio State	1
Cal Poly (a.e.t.)	2

Final
Sat • 3:00PM • Field 1
UConn	0
Cal Poly (a.e.t.)	1

==== Women's consolation ====
Quarterfinals
Fri • 3:00PM • Field 9
Georgia Tech	0
Florida State	2
Fri • 3:00PM • Field 10
Texas A&M	2
Virginia	3
Fri • 5:00PM • Field 9
Boston College	1
Baylor	0
Fri • 5:00PM • Field 10
Colorado State	2 (4)
Penn State	2 (3)

Semifinals
Sat • 8:00AM • Field 4
Florida State	0
Virginia	2
Sat • 8:00AM • Field 6
Boston College	1
Colorado State	0

Final
Sat • 1:00PM • Field 10
Virginia	1
Boston College	0

=== Men's open ===
Quarterfinals
Fri • 7:00PM • Field 7
UCLA	0 (4)
Cal Poly	0 (2)
Fri • 7:00PM • Field 8
Missouri	0 (4)
Virginia Tech	0 (3)
Fri • 7:00PM • Field 9
Miami (OH)	2
Oregon	1
Fri • 7:00PM • Field 10
Cincinnati	1
Purdue	0

Semifinals
Sat • 8:00AM • Field 7
UCLA	4
Missouri	1
Sat • 8:00AM • Field 8
Miami (OH)	3
Cincinnati	2

Final
Sat • 1:00PM • Field 9
UCLA	3
Miami (OH)	0

=== Women's open ===
Quarterfinals
Fri • 3:00PM • Field 3
Arkansas	0
Notre Dame	2
Fri • 3:00PM • Field 4
Missouri	0
UCLA	4
Fri • 3:00PM • Field 5
JMU	4
Purdue	0
Fri • 3:00PM • Field 6
Kansas	1
Penn	0

Semifinals
Sat • 8:00AM • Field 9
Notre Dame	0
UCLA	1
Sat • 8:00AM • Field 10
JMU	2
Kansas	6

Final
Sat • 1:00PM • Field 7
UCLA	1
Kansas	0

== All-tournament teams ==
Note: Only semifinalist players were eligible for selections

Key
MVP
Goalkeeper

=== Men's championship ===
#	Name	Team
13	Thys Call	BYU
1	Cris Jenkinson	BYU
10	Hasan Arif	Texas
11	Adewumi Aladetimi	UC Davis
7	Samuel Hoyt	Minnesota
1	Bennett Scheib	Minnesota
7	Eli Holmstead	BYU
5	Alejandro Ferrer Lugo	Minnesota
4	Nathan Mumford	BYU
5	Benjamin Gonzalez	BYU
22	Pedro Arredondo	Texas
8	Samuel Yarmulnik	Minnesota
Outstanding sportsmanship
Michigan State

=== Women's championship ===
#	Name	Team
26	Fiona Plunkett	Cal Poly
2	Estelle Jarrett	UConn
10	Chiara Serafini	Cal Poly
20	Vanessa Von Sosen	Cal Poly
19	Madeline Schleinitz	Cal Poly
23	Maya Presume	UConn
6	Nathalie Bravo	UConn
5	Lauren Hart	UConn
20	Alivia Wile	Ohio State
8	Jordan Reddington	Ohio State
7	Megan Thomas	Oregon
8	Clara Gullixson	Oregon
Outstanding sportsmanship
Wash U – Saint Louis

=== Men's open ===
#	Name	Team
7	Ciaran Hernon	UCLA
1	Marcus Orciuch	Purdue
7	Asad Patel	Cincinnati
39	Noah Hjelmeng	Miami (OH)
11	Zach Moeller	Cincinnati
5	Kellen Whetstone	UCLA
13	Travis Caplan	UCLA
20	Tosh Martin	UCLA
6	Nicola Conta	UCLA
24	DJ Carter	Miami (OH)
20	Andrew Frank	Missouri
22	Jack Stenzel	UCLA

=== Women's open ===
#	Name	Team
6	Alison Shea	UCLA
1	Piper Carter	Kansas
4	Kaella Chin	UCLA
13	Emily Berg	UCLA
15	McIver Levy	UCLA
2	Kyra Poro	Kansas
7	Dalton Kramer	Kansas
12	Allison Davis	Kansas
19	Julia Ritter	JMU
7	Abigial "Abby" Urban	JMU
11	Claire Krueger	Notre Dame
7	Allison Prue	Purdue

== Broadcasting ==
- Championship finals were live streamed to YouTube
