= 2019 NIRSA National Soccer Championship =

- League: NIRSA
- Sport: Soccer
- Site: Round Rock Multipurpose Complex; Round Rock, Texas
- Duration: November 21–23, 2019
- Teams: 24
- Results: Official Results

Men's Championship Division
- Score: 3–1
- Champion: BYU (7th title, 8th title game)
- Runners-up: Ohio State (3rd title game)
- Season MVP: Christian Bain (BYU)

Women's Championship Division
- Score: 2–1
- Champion: Ohio State (3rd title, 4th title game)
- Runners-up: Boston College (1st title game)
- Season MVP: Amy King (Ohio State)

Men's Open Division
- Score: 2–0
- Champion: Purdue (1st title, 1st title game)
- Runners-up: UCLA (2nd title game)
- Season MVP: Markus Raad (UCLA)

Women's Open Division
- Score: 2–0
- Champion: Oregon (2nd title, 4th title game)
- Runners-up: East Carolina (2nd title game)
- Top seed: Gabrielle Traylor (Oregon)

Unified
- Score: 6–2
- Champion: Tampa (1st title, 1st title game)
- Runners-up: NIU (1st title game)
- Top seed: Rufus Smith-Jones (NIU)

NIRSA national soccer championships seasons
- ← 2018 2021 →

The 2019 NIRSA national soccer championship was the 26th NIRSA National Soccer Championships, the annual national championships for United States-based, collegiate club soccer teams organized by NIRSA. It took place at Round Rock Multipurpose Complex, in Round Rock, Texas from Thursday, November 21 to Saturday, November 23, 2019.

== Overview ==
=== Men's championship ===
In the finals, the division's most successful team and 2017 tournament champion, BYU, returned to the finals to face 2014 champions Ohio State, with both teams being eliminated by eventual champions Florida in the previous tournament.

Coming into the finals, BYU drew their opening match to 2004 champions Texas A&M 1–1, but would defeat Iowa State 5–0 to top their group. Meanwhile, Ohio State would win both group stage games 1–0, first against four time runners-up, Texas Tech, and then against Drexel. In the knockout round, BYU would defeat Drexel in the round of 16 by a score of 2–0 then would defeat 2006 tournament champion, Michigan, 3–0 in the quarterfinals to advance past where they did the previous season. Meanwhile, Ohio State would defeat Texas A&M 3–1 in the round of 16, then would defeat 2017 runners-up, Cal Poly, 2–1 in the quarterfinals to advance to their second straight semifinals. In the semifinals, BYU would defeat 2015 champions, North Carolina, 3–0 to advance to their second title in 3 years while Ohio State would defeat Delaware 1–0 to make their third national final.

In the finals, Ohio State would open the scoring on a goal from Luke Keiser in the 7th minute, but BYU would counter with a penalty kick goal from eventual tournament MVP Christian Baines in the 14th minute to even the score and would then take the lead from on a goal from Jake Ence in the 25th minute. The game remained at 2–1 until BYU sealed the win with a goal in the last minute by Michael Anderson leading BYU to their 7th national championship. This was BYU's second title in their three seasons back since leaving the USL League 2 in 2017.

=== Women's championship ===
In the finals, reigning champions, Ohio State, returned to the finals to face finals debutants Boston College. Prior to this, in the group stage, Ohio State won their opener 2–0 against Cornell then defeated Kansas 4–1 to top their group while Boston College defeated UCLA 1–0 then Wisconsin 2–0 to also top their group.

In the knockout round, Ohio State would win their round of 16 matchup against reigning semifinalists, Illinois, 2–0 to advance to their fourth straight quarterfinals then defeated 2005 champions, Michigan, 2–0 in the quarterfinals to advance to their 3rd semifinals in the last four seasons. Meanwhile, Boston College would be deadlocked 1–1 against Grand Valley in the round of 16 after regulation and overtime meaning penalty kicks would be required. Boston College would win 7–6 in penalties to advance to the quarterfinals for the first time where they'd face 2004 co-champion and 2015 runners-up, Colorado State, who they would defeat 1–0. In the semifinals, Ohio State would defeat UCLA 3–0 to advance to their second-straight finals while Boston College would defeat four-time champion and 2004 co-champion, Colorado, 1–0 in overtime following a deadlocked regulation period.

In the finals, Ohio State opened the scoring with a goal by Emma Ruck in the 26th minute off of a cross from a free kick at midfield, but Boston College's Celia Frei scored a free kick on the edge of the box in the 28th minute to tie the game at 1–1. Ohio State would retake the lead in the 36th minute from Kiley Maxwell via an Olympico, otherwise known as scoring directly from a corner kick. This would be enough for Ohio State to claim a 2–1 victory and the national title, their third national title and second straight. This win made them only the second women's team to go back-to-back outright, with the only other team being UC-Santa Barbara. Ohio State's Amy King would go on to be named tournament MVP.

=== Men's open ===
In the finals, one of the reigning co-champions, UCLA, were looking to claim its first outright title over finals debutants Purdue. Coming into the finals, UCLA tied their opening match 1–1 against Kansas but would win their next four, including against the division's most successful team, JMU, in the semifinals. Meanwhile, after winning their first two matches, Purdue would tie their group stage finale 1–1 against Cal State San Marcos then win their quarterfinal matchup against Cornell 1–0 and their semifinal matchup against Virginia Tech 4–2. In the finals, Purdue would shutout UCLA in a 2–0 victory and claim their first open title. Despite losing the match, UCLA's Markus Raad would be named men's open MVP.

=== Women's open ===
In the finals, 2017 women's open champion, Oregon, would face 2008 women's open runners-up East Carolina. Coming into the finals, Oregon would tie their first two group stage games, but would win their group stage finale 5–0 to secure first place in the group. They would then beat Air Force 2–0 in the quarterfinals and UC-Berkeley 2–1 in the semifinals. Meanwhile, East Carolina tied their second group stage game to Missouri 1–1, but would win their other four games, including against two-time women's championship title winners, Miami (OH), in their group stage opener and the previous tournament's women's open champions, San Diego State, 1–0 in the semifinals. In the finals, Oregon would shutout UCLA and go on to win 2–0, securing their second women's open title. Oregon's Gabrielle Traylor would be named women's open MVP

=== Unified Division ===
This tournament marked the inaugural season of the Unified Division comprising teams of athletes from Special Olympic programs and partners that compete alongside them. This division brought 3 teams (Tampa Unified, Northern Illinois, and Hendrickson SOTX) that each played each other once to determine seeds for the knockout round, with the first placed team getting a bye. After gaining the 1 seed on the goals-for tiebreaker, Tampa went on to win the first United Division championship against NIU 6–2. NIU's Rufus Smith-Jones would be named Unified MVP.

== Format ==
The competition consisted of 96 teams: 48 men's teams and 48 women's teams. Each of these divisions were further divided into two 24-team divisions: the championship and open. The championship division divided teams into eight groups of three while the open division divided teams into six groups of four, both engaging in a round-robin tournament that determined teams able to advance to a knockout stage.

Pool play games were two 40-minute halves, separated by a seven-minute halftime and utilized the three points for a win system. In the championship division, the two highest ranked teams from each group advanced to their knockout stage, with the third placed team advancing to a consolation bracket. In the open division, the top team from each group as well as the two best second placed teams advanced to their knockout stage.

Tie-breaking criteria for group play
The ranking of teams in each group was based on the following criteria in order:
1. Highest number of points
2. Winner of head-to-head competition
3. Greatest goal difference
  - Maximum ± 5 goal difference per match
4. Most goals scored
5. Most shutouts

In a tie breaking scenario involving more than 2 teams, the tiebreaker procedure would begin. If one team is identified as different and both remaining teams are still tied, the tie breaker procedure is restarted.

If a tie still remained after the first 5 criteria, the following was used to break a tie:

1. NCAA kicks from the mark
  - If there was a three-way tie, a coin-flip would be conducted. The two teams that chose the same outcome would compete in kicks from the mark between each other. The winner would compete with the last remaining team in kicks from the mark
  - If there's a four-way tie, a drawing of lots would be conducted (only could occur in open division)

Knockout stage games also consisted of two 40-minute halves. The round of 16 and quarterfinals were separated by a seven-minute halftime while the semifinals and finals had a ten minute halftime. Knockout stage games needed to declare a winner. If a knockout-stage game was tied at the end of regulation, overtime would begin. Overtime consisted of one, 15-minute, golden-goal period. If still tied after overtime, kicks from the mark would determine the winner.

== Qualification and selections ==
Each of the six regions receives three automatic bids for both the men's and women's championship that they award to its members. The final six bids are considered "at-large", and are given out by NIRSA to teams, typically based on the regional tournament results and RPI.

The 48 remaining teams participating in the open division were selected via a lottery draw that took place at 8:00am PST on October 4, 2019 via YouTube. Any team with membership in a NIRSA-affiliated league or with a minimum of four games played prior to the tournament were able to enter their name into the lottery. If a selected team qualified for the championship division, an alternate would take their spot. 54 men's teams and 56 women's were selected.

=== Men's championship ===
Automatic bid
Region	Method	Team	Appearance	Last Bid
I	Tournament; Co-champion	Drexel	1st	Never
I	Tournament; Co-champion	Tufts	3rd	2016
I	Highest RPI of remaining teams	Delaware	13th	2018
II	Tournament; Champion	Florida State	3rd	2015
II	Highest RPI of remaining teams	North Carolina	15th	2018
II	2nd highest RPI of remaining teams	Florida	13th	2018
III	Tournament; Co-champion	Ohio State	14th	2018
III	Tournament; Co-champion	Wisconsin	5th	2018
III	Highest RPI of remaining teams	Michigan	16th	2018
IV	North Tournament; Champion	Arkansas	1st	Never
IV	South Tournament; Co-champion	Texas Southmost	1st	Never
IV	South Tournament; Co-champion	Texas	19th	2018
V	Tournament; Co-champion	Iowa State	3rd	2015
V	Tournament; Co-champion	Colorado Mines	8th	2017
V	Highest RPI of remaining teams	Colorado	18th	2018
VI	North Tournament; Champion	BYU	10th	2018
VI	South Tournament; Co-champion	USC	3rd	2012
VI	South Tournament; Co-champion	Cal Poly	10th	2018

At-large bids
Region	Team	Appearance	Last Bid
III	Michigan State	12th	2018
IV	Texas A&M	19th	2017
IV	Texas Tech	9th	2018
V	Colorado State	21st	2018
VI	UC-Santa Barbara	11th	2017
VI	Minnesota	15th	2017

=== Women's championship ===
Automatic bid
Region	Method	Team	Appearance	Last Bid
I	Tournament; Co-champion	UConn	3rd	2018
I	Tournament; Co-champion	Boston College	4th	2012
I	Highest RPI of remaining teams	Cornell	10th	2015
II	Tournament; Champion	Virginia Tech	16th	2017
II	Highest RPI of remaining teams	Clemson	6th	2018
II	2nd highest RPI of remaining teams	JMU	11th	2007
III	Tournament; Champion	Wisconsin	4th	2018
III	Tournament; Runner-up	Michigan	19th	2018
III	Highest RPI of remaining teams	Illinois	14th	2018
IV	North Tournament; Champion	Kansas	9th	2018
IV	South Tournament; Co-champion	Texas	20th	2018
IV	South Tournament; Co-champion	Rice	2nd	1999
V	Tournament; Co-champion	Minnesota	1st	Never
V	Tournament; Co-champion	Colorado	25th	2018
V	Highest RPI of remaining teams	Colorado State	23rd	2018
VI	North Tournament; Champion	Gonzaga	4th	2018
VI	South Tournament; Co-champion	Cal Poly	8th	2017
VI	South Tournament; Co-champion	UC-Santa Barbara	19th	2018

At-large bids
Region	Team	Appearance	Last Bid
I	The College of New Jersey	5th	2018
II	North Carolina	16th	2018
III	Grand Valley State	1st	Never
III	Ohio State	19th	2018
VI	UCLA	7th	2013
VI	USC	3rd	2014

=== Men's lottery selection ===
Full men's lottery selections
Region	Team	Selection Type	Bid result
I	Penn	Automatic	Accepted
I	Towson	Automatic	Accepted
I	Vermont	Automatic	Accepted
I	Northeastern	Automatic	Not accepted
I	Cornell	Automatic	Accepted
I	SUNY Cortland	Waitlist	Accepted from waitlist
I	Worcester Poly	Waitlist	Not given
I	New Haven	Waitlist	Not given
I	Lehigh	Waitlist	Not given
I	Pittsburgh	Waitlist	Not given
I	Penn State	Waitlist	Not given
I	UMBC	Waitlist	Not given
I	Rutgers	Waitlist	Not given
I	Montclair State	Waitlist	Not given
I	Canisius	Waitlist	Not given
I	Fordham	Waitlist	Not given
I	Elizabethtown	Waitlist	Not given
I	Amherst College	Waitlist	Not given
I	Fairfield	Waitlist	Not given
I	UConn	Waitlist	Not given
I	George Mason	Waitlist	Not given
I	UMass Amherst	Waitlist	Not given
I	Villanova	Waitlist	Not given
II	Miami (FL)	Automatic	Accepted
II	JMU	Automatic	Accepted
II	Appalachian State	Automatic	Not accepted
II	Florida State	Automatic	Championship
II	Georgia Highlands	Waitlist	Accepted from waitlist
II	Georgia College	Waitlist	Not accepted
II	Virginia Tech	Waitlist	Accepted from waitlist
II	High Point	Waitlist	Not given
II	Kennesaw State	Waitlist	Not given
II	Georgia Tech	Waitlist	Not given
II	Emory	Waitlist	Not given
III	Xavier	Automatic	Accepted
III	Ohio U	Automatic	Accepted
III	Grand Valley State	Automatic	Accepted
III	Purdue	Automatic	Accepted
III	Illinois State	Waitlist	Not given
III	Miami (OH)	Waitlist	Not given
III	Illinois	Waitlist	Not given
III	Butler	Waitlist	Not given
III	Kent State	Waitlist	Not given
IV	St. Edwards	Automatic	Accepted
IV	Kansas	Automatic	Accepted
IV	LSU	Automatic	Accepted
V	Colorado Springs	Automatic	Not accepted
V	Colorado State	Automatic	Championship
V	Colorado College	Automatic	Accepted
V	Iowa State	Automatic	Championship
V	Minnesota St. Moorhead	Waitlist	Not given
V	Colorado Mines	Waitlist	Championship
V	Minnesota	Waitlist	Accepted from waitlist
V	Colorado	Waitlist	Championship
VI	Cal State San Marcos	Automatic	Accepted
VI	Arizona	Automatic	Accepted
VI	Utah Valley	Automatic	Accepted
VI	UCLA	Automatic	Accepted
VI	Cal State Fullerton	Waitlist	Accepted from waitlist
VI	Utah	Waitlist	Not given
VI	Oregon	Waitlist	Not given
VI	UC-Santa Barbara	Waitlist	Championship

Participating men's lottery teams
Region	Team	Selection Type	Bid result
I	Penn	Automatic	Accepted
I	Towson	Automatic	Accepted
I	Vermont	Automatic	Accepted
I	Cornell	Automatic	Accepted
I	SUNY Cortland	Waitlist	Accepted from waitlist
II	Miami (FL)	Automatic	Accepted
II	JMU	Automatic	Accepted
II	Georgia Highlands	Waitlist	Accepted from waitlist
II	Virginia Tech	Waitlist	Accepted from waitlist
III	Xavier	Automatic	Accepted
III	Ohio U	Automatic	Accepted
III	Grand Valley State	Automatic	Accepted
III	Purdue	Automatic	Accepted
IV	St. Edwards	Automatic	Accepted
IV	Kansas	Automatic	Accepted
IV	LSU	Automatic	Accepted
IV	Missouri	Invite	Accepted via invite
V	Colorado College	Automatic	Accepted
V	Minnesota	Waitlist	Accepted from waitlist
VI	Cal State San Marcos	Automatic	Accepted
VI	Arizona	Automatic	Accepted
VI	Utah Valley	Automatic	Accepted
VI	UCLA	Automatic	Accepted
VI	Cal State Fullerton	Waitlist	Accepted from waitlist

=== Women's lottery selection ===
Full women's lottery selections
Region	Team	Selection Type	Bid result
I	Carnegie Mellon	Automatic	Not accepted
I	Boston College	Automatic	Accepted
I	UMass Amherst	Automatic	Accepted
I	Vermont	Automatic	Accepted
I	Pittsburgh	Waitlist	Not accepted
I	Penn	Waitlist	Accepted from waitlist
I	Boston U	Waitlist	Not accepted
I	Penn State	Waitlist	Accepted from waitlist
I	Fordham	Waitlist	Not given
I	Cornell	Waitlist	Championship
I	West Virginia	Waitlist	Not given
I	Loyola Maryland	Waitlist	Not given
I	UMass Lowell	Waitlist	Not given
I	Villanova	Waitlist	Not given
I	Towson	Waitlist	Not given
I	UConn	Waitlist	Championship
I	The College of New Jersey	Waitlist	Not given
II	USF	Automatic	Not accepted
II	Emory	Automatic	Not accepted
II	Georgia Southern	Automatic	Accepted
II	Virginia Tech	Automatic	Championship
II	East Carolina	Waitlist	Accepted from waitlist
II	Tennessee	Waitlist	Not accepted
II	Kennesaw State	Waitlist	Accepted from waitlist
II	JMU	Waitlist	Championship
II	Georgia	Waitlist	Not given
II	UCF	Waitlist	Not given
II	Florida Gulf Coast	Waitlist	Not given
II	Miami (FL)	Waitlist	Not given
III	Miami (OH)	Automatic	Accepted
III	Notre Dame	Automatic	Accepted
III	Iowa	Automatic	Accepted
III	Illinois State	Automatic	Not accepted
III	Dayton	Waitlist	Not given
III	Cincinnati	Waitlist	Not given
III	Bowling Green	Waitlist	Not given
III	Illinois	Waitlist	Championship
III	Purdue	Waitlist	Not given
III	Xavier	Waitlist	Not given
III	Grand Valley State	Waitlist	Not given
III	Ohio U	Waitlist	Not given
IV	St. Edwards	Automatic	Accepted
IV	Texas A&M Galveston	Automatic	Accepted
IV	Missouri	Automatic	Accepted
IV	LSU	Automatic	Not accepted
IV	WashU	Waitlist	Not given
V	Colorado	Automatic	Accepted
V	Minnesota	Automatic	Championship
V	Iowa State	Automatic	Accepted
V	Northern Colorado	Automatic	Accepted
V	Air Force	Waitlist	Accepted from waitlist
V	Fort Lewis	Waitlist	Not given
V	Colorado Springs	Waitlist	Not given
V	Colorado Mines	Waitlist	Not given
V	Colorado State	Waitlist	Championship
VI	San Diego State	Automatic	Accepted
VI	Cal Poly	Automatic	Championship
VI	Oregon	Automatic	Accepted
VI	Western Oregon	Automatic	Accepted
VI	Southern Cal (USC)	Waitlist	Championship
VI	UC-Berkeley	Waitlist	Accepted from waitlist
VI	Arizona	Waitlist	Not given
VI	UC-Santa Barbara	Waitlist	Championship
VI	UCLA	Waitlist	Championship
VI	Cal State	Waitlist	Not given
VI	Montana State	Waitlist	Not given
VI	Gonzaga	Waitlist	Not given

Participating women's open teams
Region	Team	Selection Type	Bid result
I	Boston College	Automatic	Accepted
I	UMass Amherst	Automatic	Accepted
I	Vermont	Automatic	Accepted
I	Penn	Waitlist	Accepted from waitlist
I	Penn State	Waitlist	Accepted from waitlist
II	Georgia Southern	Automatic	Accepted
II	East Carolina	Waitlist	Accepted from waitlist
II	Kennesaw State	Waitlist	Accepted from waitlist
III	Miami (OH)	Automatic	Accepted
III	Notre Dame	Automatic	Accepted
III	Iowa	Automatic	Accepted
III	Central Michigan	Invite	Accepted via invite
IV	St. Edwards	Automatic	Accepted
IV	Texas A&M – Galveston	Automatic	Accepted
IV	Missouri	Automatic	Accepted
IV	Texas Tech	Invite	Accepted via invite
V	Colorado "Black"	Automatic	Accepted
V	Iowa State	Automatic	Accepted
V	Northern Colorado	Automatic	Accepted
V	Air Force	Waitlist	Accepted from waitlist
VI	San Diego State	Automatic	Accepted
VI	Oregon	Automatic	Accepted
VI	Western Oregon	Automatic	Accepted
VI	UC-Berkeley	Waitlist	Accepted from waitlist

== Group stage ==
Results from pool play from all 4 divisions:

Tie-breaking criteria for group play
The ranking of teams in each group was based on the following criteria in order:
1. Highest number of points
2. Winner of head-to-head competition
3. Greatest goal difference
  - Maximum ± 5 goal difference per match
4. Most goals scored
5. Most shutouts

In a tie breaking scenario involving more than 2 teams, the tiebreaker procedure would begin as normal. If one team is identified as different and both remaining teams are still tied, the tie breaker procedure is restarted with the two teams that were still tied.

If a tie still remained after the first 5 criteria, the following was used to break a tie:

1. NCAA kicks from the mark
  - If there was a three-way tie, a coin-flip would be conducted. The two teams that chose the same outcome would compete in kicks from the mark between each other. The winner would compete with the last remaining team in kicks from the mark
  - If there's a four-way tie, a drawing of lots would be conducted (only could occur in open division)

=== Men's championship ===
Group A
Pos	Team	Pld	W	D	L	GF	GA	GD	Pts	Qualification
1	Ohio State	2	2	0	0	2	0	+2	6	Advanced to knockout stage
2	Drexel	2	1	0	1	2	2	0	3	Advanced to knockout stage
3	Texas Tech	2	0	0	2	1	3	−2	0	Consolation

Scores

8:00am CST	Ohio State	1–0	Texas Tech	Field 7
Thu, November 21		Report		Stadium: Round Rock Multipurpose Complex; Round Rock, Texas

1:15pm CST	Texas Tech	1–2	Drexel	Field 9
Thu, November 21		Report		Stadium: Round Rock Multipurpose Complex; Round Rock, Texas

6:30pm CST	Drexel	0–1	Ohio State	Field 8
Thu, November 21		Report		Stadium: Round Rock Multipurpose Complex; Round Rock, Texas

Group B
Pos	Team	Pld	W	D	L	GF	GA	GD	Pts	Qualification
1	Wisconsin	2	1	1	0	3	1	+2	4 (Note: Tied on points, head to head, goal difference, goals for, and shutouts. Kicks from the mark occurred to separate seeds, Wisconsin went on to win)	Advanced to knockout stage
2	UC-Santa Barbara	2	1	1	0	3	1	+2	4	Advanced to knockout stage
3	Colorado Mines	2	0	0	2	0	4	−4	0	Consolation

Scores

8:00am CST	Wisconsin	1–1	UCSB	Field 8
Thu, November 21		Report		Stadium: Round Rock Multipurpose Complex; Round Rock, Texas

1:15pm CST	UCSB	2–0	Colorado Mines	Field 10
Thu, November 21		Report		Stadium: Round Rock Multipurpose Complex; Round Rock, Texas

6:30pm CST	Colorado Mines	0–2	Wisconsin	Field 7
Thu, November 21		Report		Stadium: Round Rock Multipurpose Complex; Round Rock, Texas

9:15am CST	Wisconsin	1–0; Kicks from the mark	UC-Santa Barbara	Field 10
Fri, November 22		Report		Stadium: Round Rock Multipurpose Complex; Round Rock, Texas

Notes:

Group C
Pos	Team	Pld	W	D	L	GF	GA	GD	Pts	Qualification
1	North Carolina	2	1	1	0	2	1	+1	4	Advanced to knockout stage
2	Delaware	2	0	2	0	3	3	0	2	Advanced to knockout stage
3	Minnesota	2	0	1	1	2	3	−1	1	Consolation

Scores

8:00am CST	North Carolina	1–0	Minnesota	Field 9
Thu, November 21		Report		Stadium: Round Rock Multipurpose Complex; Round Rock, Texas

1:15pm CST	Minnesota	2–2	Delaware	Field 7
Thu, November 21		Report		Stadium: Round Rock Multipurpose Complex; Round Rock, Texas

6:30pm CST	Delaware	1–1	North Carolina	Field 10
Thu, November 21		Report		Stadium: Round Rock Multipurpose Complex; Round Rock, Texas

Group D
Pos	Team	Pld	W	D	L	GF	GA	GD	Pts	Qualification
1	BYU	2	1	1	0	6	1	+5	4	Advanced to knockout stage
2	Texas A&M	2	0	2	0	1	1	0	2	Advanced to knockout stage
3	Iowa State	2	0	1	1	0	5	−5	1	Consolation

Scores

8:00am CST	BYU	1–1	Texas A&M	Field 10
Thu, November 21		Report		Stadium: Round Rock Multipurpose Complex; Round Rock, Texas

1:15pm CST	Texas A&M	0–0	Iowa State	Field 8
Thu, November 21		Report		Stadium: Round Rock Multipurpose Complex; Round Rock, Texas

6:30pm CST	Iowa State	0–5	BYU	Field 9
Thu, November 21		Report		Stadium: Round Rock Multipurpose Complex; Round Rock, Texas

Group E
Pos	Team	Pld	W	D	L	GF	GA	GD	Pts	Qualification
1	Michigan	2	2	0	0	3	0	+3	6	Advanced to knockout stage
2	Colorado State	2	1	0	1	3	3	0	3	Advanced to knockout stage
3	Texas	2	0	0	2	1	4	−3	0	Consolation

Scores

9:45am CST	Texas	1–3	Colorado State	Field 7
Thu, November 21		Report		Stadium: Round Rock Multipurpose Complex; Round Rock, Texas

3:00pm CST	Colorado State	0–2	Michigan	Field 9
Thu, November 21		Report		Stadium: Round Rock Multipurpose Complex; Round Rock, Texas

8:15pm CST	Michigan	1–0	Texas	Field 8
Thu, November 21		Report		Stadium: Round Rock Multipurpose Complex; Round Rock, Texas

Group F
Pos	Team	Pld	W	D	L	GF	GA	GD	Pts	Qualification
1	Michigan State	2	2	0	0	5	0	+5	6	Advanced to knockout stage
2	Florida	2	1	0	1	1	2	−1	3	Advanced to knockout stage
3	Tufts	2	0	0	2	0	4	−4	0	Consolation

Scores

9:45am CST	Florida	0–2	Michigan State	Field 8
Thu, November 21		Report		Stadium: Round Rock Multipurpose Complex; Round Rock, Texas

3:00pm CST	Michigan State	3–0	Tufts	Field 10
Thu, November 21		Report		Stadium: Round Rock Multipurpose Complex; Round Rock, Texas

8:15pm CST	Tufts	0–1	Florida	Field 7
Thu, November 21		Report		Stadium: Round Rock Multipurpose Complex; Round Rock, Texas

Group G
Pos	Team	Pld	W	D	L	GF	GA	GD	Pts	Qualification
1	Southern Cal (USC)	2	2	0	0	3	0	+3	6	Advanced to knockout stage
2	Colorado	2	0	1	1	2	3	−1	1	Advanced to knockout stage
3	Arkansas	2	0	1	1	2	4	−2	1	Consolation

Scores

9:45am CST	Colorado	2–2	Arkansas	Field 9
Thu, November 21		Report		Stadium: Round Rock Multipurpose Complex; Round Rock, Texas

3:00pm CST	Arkansas	0–2	USC	Field 7
Thu, November 21		Report		Stadium: Round Rock Multipurpose Complex; Round Rock, Texas

8:15pm CST	USC	1–0	Colorado	Field 10
Thu, November 21		Report		Stadium: Round Rock Multipurpose Complex; Round Rock, Texas

Group H
Pos	Team	Pld	W	D	L	GF	GA	GD	Pts	Qualification
1	Cal Poly	2	2	0	0	6	2	+4	6	Advanced to knockout stage
2	Florida State	2	1	0	1	6	5	+1	3	Advanced to knockout stage
3	Texas Southmost	2	0	0	2	3	8	−5	0	Consolation

Scores

9:45am CST	Florida State	5–2	Texas Southmost	Field 10
Thu, November 21		Report		Stadium: Round Rock Multipurpose Complex; Round Rock, Texas

3:00pm CST	Texas Southmost	1–3	Cal Poly	Field 8
Thu, November 21		Report		Stadium: Round Rock Multipurpose Complex; Round Rock, Texas

8:15pm CST	Cal Poly	3–1	Florida State	Field 9
Thu, November 21		Report		Stadium: Round Rock Multipurpose Complex; Round Rock, Texas

=== Women's Championship ===
Group A
Pos	Team	Pld	W	D	L	GF	GA	GD	Pts	Qualification
1	Ohio State	2	2	0	0	6	1	+5	6	Advanced to knockout stage
2	Kansas	2	1	0	1	3	4	−1	3	Advanced to knockout stage
3	Cornell	2	0	0	2	0	4	−4	0	Consolation

Scores

8:00am CST	Ohio State	2–0	Cornell	Field 3
Thu, November 21		Report		Stadium: Round Rock Multipurpose Complex; Round Rock, Texas

1:15pm CST	Cornell	0–2	Kansas	Field 5
Thu, November 21		Report		Stadium: Round Rock Multipurpose Complex; Round Rock, Texas

6:30pm CST	Kansas	1–4	Ohio State	Field 4
Thu, November 21		Report		Stadium: Round Rock Multipurpose Complex; Round Rock, Texas

Group B
Pos	Team	Pld	W	D	L	GF	GA	GD	Pts	Qualification
1	Clemson	2	2	0	0	2	0	+2	6	Advanced to knockout stage
2	Grand Valley	2	1	0	1	1	1	0	3	Advanced to knockout stage
3	UConn	2	0	0	2	0	2	−2	0	Consolation

Scores

8:00am CST	Clemson	1–0	Grand Valley	Field 4
Thu, November 21		Report		Stadium: Round Rock Multipurpose Complex; Round Rock, Texas

1:15pm CST	Grand Valley	1–0	UConn	Field 6
Thu, November 21		Report		Stadium: Round Rock Multipurpose Complex; Round Rock, Texas

6:30pm CST	UConn	0–1	Clemson	Field 4
Thu, November 21		Report		Stadium: Round Rock Multipurpose Complex; Round Rock, Texas

Group C
Pos	Team	Pld	W	D	L	GF	GA	GD	Pts	Qualification
1	Boston College	2	2	0	0	3	0	+3	6	Advanced to knockout stage
2	UCLA	2	0	1	1	0	1	−1	1	Advanced to knockout stage
3	Wisconsin	2	0	1	1	0	2	−2	1	Consolation

Scores

8:00am CST	Wisconsin	0–0	UCLA	Field 5
Thu, November 21		Report		Stadium: Round Rock Multipurpose Complex; Round Rock, Texas

1:15pm CST	UCLA	0–1	Boston College	Field 3
Thu, November 21		Report		Stadium: Round Rock Multipurpose Complex; Round Rock, Texas

6:30pm CST	Boston College	2–0	Wisconsin	Field 6
Thu, November 21		Report		Stadium: Round Rock Multipurpose Complex; Round Rock, Texas

Group D
Pos	Team	Pld	W	D	L	GF	GA	GD	Pts	Qualification
1	Colorado	2	1	1	0	4	0	+4	4	Advanced to knockout stage
2	Illinois	2	1	1	0	4	2	+2	4	Advanced to knockout stage
3	The College of New Jersey	2	0	0	2	2	8	−6	0	Consolation

Scores

8:00am CST	Colorado	0–0	Illinois	Field 6
Thu, November 21		Report		Stadium: Round Rock Multipurpose Complex; Round Rock, Texas

1:15pm CST	Illinois	4–2	TCNJ	Field 4
Thu, November 21		Report		Stadium: Round Rock Multipurpose Complex; Round Rock, Texas

6:30pm CST	TCNJ	0–4	Colorado	Field 3
Thu, November 21		Report		Stadium: Round Rock Multipurpose Complex; Round Rock, Texas

Group E
Pos	Team	Pld	W	D	L	GF	GA	GD	Pts	Qualification
1	UC-Santa Barbara	2	2	0	0	5	0	+5	6	Advanced to knockout stage
2	Virginia Tech	2	1	0	1	1	1	0	3	Advanced to knockout stage
3	Rice	2	0	0	2	0	5	−5	0	Consolation

Scores

9:45am CST	Virginia Tech	1–0	Rice	Field 3
Thu, November 21		Report		Stadium: Round Rock Multipurpose Complex; Round Rock, Texas

3:00pm CST	Rice	0–4	UCSB	Field 5
Thu, November 21		Report		Stadium: Round Rock Multipurpose Complex; Round Rock, Texas

8:15pm CST	UCSB	1–0	Virginia Tech	Field 4
Thu, November 21		Report		Stadium: Round Rock Multipurpose Complex; Round Rock, Texas

Group F
Pos	Team	Pld	W	D	L	GF	GA	GD	Pts	Qualification
1	Colorado State	2	1	1	0	3	0	+3	4	Advanced to knockout stage
2	Cal Poly	2	1	1	0	2	1	+1	4	Advanced to knockout stage
3	North Carolina	2	0	0	2	1	5	−4	0	Consolation

Scores

9:45am CST	Cal Poly	2–1	North Carolina	Field 4
Thu, November 21		Report		Stadium: Round Rock Multipurpose Complex; Round Rock, Texas

3:00pm CST	North Carolina	0–3	Colorado State	Field 6
Thu, November 21		Report		Stadium: Round Rock Multipurpose Complex; Round Rock, Texas

8:15pm CST	Colorado State	0–0	Cal Poly	Field 3
Thu, November 21		Report		Stadium: Round Rock Multipurpose Complex; Round Rock, Texas

Group G
Pos	Team	Pld	W	D	L	GF	GA	GD	Pts	Qualification
1	Texas	2	1	1	0	3	1	+2	4	Advanced to knockout stage
2	Southern Cal	2	1	0	1	3	3	0	3	Advanced to knockout stage
3	Minnesota	2	0	1	1	2	4	−2	1	Consolation

Scores

9:45am CST	Texas	2–0	Southern Cal	Field 5
Thu, November 21		Report		Stadium: Round Rock Multipurpose Complex; Round Rock, Texas

3:00pm CST	Southern Cal	3–1	Minnesota	Field 3
Thu, November 21		Report		Stadium: Round Rock Multipurpose Complex; Round Rock, Texas

8:15pm CST	Minnesota	1–1	Texas	Field 6
Thu, November 21		Report		Stadium: Round Rock Multipurpose Complex; Round Rock, Texas

Group H
Pos	Team	Pld	W	D	L	GF	GA	GD	Pts	Qualification
1	Michigan	2	2	0	0	3	1	+2	6	Advanced to knockout stage
2	James Madison	2	0	1	1	2	3	−1	1	Advanced to knockout stage
3	Gonzaga	2	0	1	1	1	2	−1	1	Consolation

Scores

9:45am CST	Michigan	2–1	James Madison	Field 6
Thu, November 21		Report		Stadium: Round Rock Multipurpose Complex; Round Rock, Texas

3:00pm CST	James Madison	1–1	Gonzaga	Field 4
Thu, November 21		Report		Stadium: Round Rock Multipurpose Complex; Round Rock, Texas

8:15pm CST	Gonzaga	0–1	Michigan	Field 5
Thu, November 21		Report		Stadium: Round Rock Multipurpose Complex; Round Rock, Texas

=== Men's open ===
Group A
Pos	Team	Pld	W	D	L	GF	GA	GD	Pts	Qualification
1	Utah Valley	3	2	0	1	3	2	+1	6	Advanced to knockout stage
2	Xavier	3	1	1	1	5	4	+1	4	
3	Minnesota "B"	3	1	1	1	5	5	0	4	
4	Georgia Highlands	3	1	0	2	4	6	−2	3	

Scores

11:30am CST	Utah Valley	2–0	Georgia Highlands	Field OSP1
Thu, November 21		Report		Stadium: Round Rock Multipurpose Complex; Round Rock, Texas

11:30am CST	Xavier	2–2	Minnesota "B"	Field OSP2
Thu, November 21		Report		Stadium: Round Rock Multipurpose Complex; Round Rock, Texas

6:30pm CST	Minnesota "B"	0–1	Utah Valley	Field OSP3
Thu, November 21		Report		Stadium: Round Rock Multipurpose Complex; Round Rock, Texas

6:30pm CST	Georgia Highlands	2–1	Xavier	Field OSP4
Thu, November 21		Report		Stadium: Round Rock Multipurpose Complex; Round Rock, Texas

10:00am CST	Utah Valley	0–2	Xavier	Field OSP5
Fri, November 22		Report		Stadium: Round Rock Multipurpose Complex; Round Rock, Texas

10:00am CST	Minnesota "B"	3–2	Georgia Highlands	Field 2
Fri, November 22		Report		Stadium: Round Rock Multipurpose Complex; Round Rock, Texas

Group B
Pos	Team	Pld	W	D	L	GF	GA	GD	Pts	Qualification
1	Arizona	3	2	0	1	5	3	+2	6	Advanced to knockout stage
2	Missouri	3	1	1	1	3	3	0	4	
3	Towson	3	1	1	1	2	4	−2	4	
4	Ohio	3	1	0	2	5	5	0	3	

Scores

11:30am CST	Arizona	3–0	Ohio	Field OSP3
Thu, November 21		Report		Stadium: Round Rock Multipurpose Complex; Round Rock, Texas

11:30am CST	Towson	0–0	Missouri	Field OSP4
Thu, November 21		Report		Stadium: Round Rock Multipurpose Complex; Round Rock, Texas

6:30pm CST	Missouri	1–2	Arizona	Field OSP5
Thu, November 21		Report		Stadium: Round Rock Multipurpose Complex; Round Rock, Texas

6:30pm CST	Ohio	4–0	Towson	Field 2
Thu, November 21		Report		Stadium: Round Rock Multipurpose Complex; Round Rock, Texas

10:00am CST	Arizona	0–2	Towson	Field OSP1
Fri, November 22		Report		Stadium: Round Rock Multipurpose Complex; Round Rock, Texas

10:00am CST	Missouri	2–1	Ohio	Field OSP2
Fri, November 22		Report		Stadium: Round Rock Multipurpose Complex; Round Rock, Texas

Group C
Pos	Team	Pld	W	D	L	GF	GA	GD	Pts	Qualification
1	UCLA	3	2	1	0	5	2	+3	7	Advanced to knockout stage
2	Kansas	3	1	2	0	3	2	+1	5	
3	Grand Valley	3	1	1	1	4	4	0	4	
4	Vermont	3	0	0	3	1	5	−4	0	

Scores

11:30am CST	UCLA	1–1	Kansas	Field OSP5
Thu, November 21		Report		Stadium: Round Rock Multipurpose Complex; Round Rock, Texas

11:30am CST	Vermont	1–2	Grand Valley	Field 2
Thu, November 21		Report		Stadium: Round Rock Multipurpose Complex; Round Rock, Texas

6:30pm CST	Grand Valley	1–2	UCLA	Field OSP1
Thu, November 21		Report		Stadium: Round Rock Multipurpose Complex; Round Rock, Texas

6:30pm CST	Kansas	1–0	Vermont	Field OSP2
Thu, November 21		Report		Stadium: Round Rock Multipurpose Complex; Round Rock, Texas

10:00am CST	UCLA	2–0	Vermont	Field OSP3
Fri, November 22		Report		Stadium: Round Rock Multipurpose Complex; Round Rock, Texas

10:00am CST	Grand Valley	1–1	Kansas	Field OSP4
Fri, November 22		Report		Stadium: Round Rock Multipurpose Complex; Round Rock, Texas

Group D
Pos	Team	Pld	W	D	L	GF	GA	GD	Pts	Qualification
1	Purdue	3	2	1	0	6	2	+4	7	Advanced to knockout stage
2	Cal State San Marcos	3	2	1	0	4	2	+2	7	
3	SUNY Cortland	3	1	0	2	5	8	−3	3	
4	Miami (FL)	3	0	0	3	2	5	−3	0	

Scores

1:15pm CST	Miami (FL)	0–1	Purdue	Field OSP1
Thu, November 21		Report		Stadium: Round Rock Multipurpose Complex; Round Rock, Texas

1:15pm CST	SUNY Cortland	1–2	Cal State San Marcos	Field OSP2
Thu, November 21		Report		Stadium: Round Rock Multipurpose Complex; Round Rock, Texas

8:15pm CST	Cal State San Marcos	1–0	Miami (FL)	Field OSP3
Thu, November 21		Report		Stadium: Round Rock Multipurpose Complex; Round Rock, Texas

8:15pm CST	Purdue	4–1	SUNY Cortland	Field OSP4
Thu, November 21		Report		Stadium: Round Rock Multipurpose Complex; Round Rock, Texas

12:00pm CST	Miami (FL)	2–3	SUNY Cortland	Field OSP5
Fri, November 22		Report		Stadium: Round Rock Multipurpose Complex; Round Rock, Texas

12:00pm CST	Cal State San Marcos	1–1	Purdue	Field 2
Fri, November 22		Report		Stadium: Round Rock Multipurpose Complex; Round Rock, Texas

Group E
Pos	Team	Pld	W	D	L	GF	GA	GD	Pts	Qualification
1	JMU	3	2	1	0	10	2	+6 (Note: Actual GD differs because the max GD for any one game is ±5, which came into effect when JMU beat St. Edward's 6–0)	7	Advanced to knockout stage
2	Cornell	3	2	1	0	7	3	+4	7	Advanced to knockout stage
3	Cal State Fullerton	3	1	0	2	5	7	−2	3	
4	St. Edward's	3	0	0	3	3	13	−9	0	

Scores

1:15pm CST	JMU	6–0	St. Edward's	Field OSP3
Thu, November 21		Report		Stadium: Round Rock Multipurpose Complex; Round Rock, Texas

1:15pm CST	Cornell	2–1	Cal State Fullerton	Field OSP4
Thu, November 21		Report		Stadium: Round Rock Multipurpose Complex; Round Rock, Texas

8:15pm CST	Cal State Fullerton	0–2	JMU	Field OSP5
Thu, November 21		Report		Stadium: Round Rock Multipurpose Complex; Round Rock, Texas

8:15pm CST	St. Edward's	0–3	Cornell	Field 2
Thu, November 21		Report		Stadium: Round Rock Multipurpose Complex; Round Rock, Texas

12:00pm CST	JMU	2–2	Cornell	Field OSP1
Fri, November 22		Report		Stadium: Round Rock Multipurpose Complex; Round Rock, Texas

12:00pm CST	Cal State Fullerton	4–3	St. Edward's	Field OSP2
Fri, November 22		Report		Stadium: Round Rock Multipurpose Complex; Round Rock, Texas

Notes:

Group F
Pos	Team	Pld	W	D	L	GF	GA	GD	Pts	Qualification
1	Virginia Tech	3	2	1	0	7	2	+5	7	Advanced to knockout stage
2	Penn	3	2	1	0	5	1	+4	7	Advanced to knockout stage
3	LSU	3	1	0	2	3	5	−2	3	
4	Colorado College	3	0	0	3	2	9	−7	0	

Scores

1:15pm CST	Virginia Tech	4–1	Colorado College	Field OSP5
Thu, November 21		Report		Stadium: Round Rock Multipurpose Complex; Round Rock, Texas

1:15pm CST	Penn	2–0	LSU	Field 2
Thu, November 21		Report		Stadium: Round Rock Multipurpose Complex; Round Rock, Texas

8:15pm CST	LSU	0–2	Virginia Tech	Field OSP1
Thu, November 21		Report		Stadium: Round Rock Multipurpose Complex; Round Rock, Texas

8:15pm CST	Colorado College	0–2	Penn	Field OSP2
Thu, November 21		Report		Stadium: Round Rock Multipurpose Complex; Round Rock, Texas

12:00pm CST	Virginia Tech	1–1	Penn	Field OSP3
Fri, November 22		Report		Stadium: Round Rock Multipurpose Complex; Round Rock, Texas

12:00pm CST	LSU	3–1	Colorado College	Field OSP4
Fri, November 22		Report		Stadium: Round Rock Multipurpose Complex; Round Rock, Texas

=== Women's open ===
Group A
Pos	Team	Pld	W	D	L	GF	GA	GD	Pts	Qualification
1	San Diego State	3	3	0	0	15	2	+9 (Note: Actual GD differs because the max GD for any one game is ±5, which came into effect when SDSU beat St. Edwards 9–0)	9	Advanced to knockout stage
2	Penn	3	2	0	1	7	3	+4	6	
3	Iowa	3	1	0	2	7	4	+2 (Note: Actual GD differs because the max GD for any one game is ±5, which came into effect when Iowa beat St. Edwards 6–0)	3	
4	St. Edward's	3	0	0	3	0	20	−15	0	

Scores

8:00am CST	San Diego State	3–1	Iowa	Field OSP1
Thu, November 21		Report		Stadium: Round Rock Multipurpose Complex; Round Rock, Texas

8:00am CST	Penn	5–0	St. Edward's	Field OSP2
Thu, November 21		Report		Stadium: Round Rock Multipurpose Complex; Round Rock, Texas

3:00pm CST	St. Edward's	0–9	San Diego State	Field OSP3
Thu, November 21		Report		Stadium: Round Rock Multipurpose Complex; Round Rock, Texas

3:00pm CST	Iowa	0–1	Penn	Field OSP4
Thu, November 21		Report		Stadium: Round Rock Multipurpose Complex; Round Rock, Texas

8:00am CST	San Diego State	3–1	Penn	Field OSP2
		Report		Stadium: Round Rock Multipurpose Complex; Round Rock, Texas

8:00am CST	St. Edward's	0–6	Iowa	Field OSP3
		Report		Stadium: Round Rock Multipurpose Complex; Round Rock, Texas

Notes:

Group B
Pos	Team	Pld	W	D	L	GF	GA	GD	Pts	Qualification
1	Iowa State	3	2	1	0	8	0	+8	7	Advanced to knockout stage
2	Vermont	3	2	1	0	4	1	+3	7	Advanced to knockout stage
3	Western Oregon	3	1	0	2	2	6	−4	3	
4	Central Michigan	3	0	0	3	2	9	−7	0	

Scores

8:00am CST	Iowa State	4–0	Western Oregon	Field OSP3
Thu, November 21		Report		Stadium: Round Rock Multipurpose Complex; Round Rock, Texas

8:00am CST	Vermont	3–1	Central Michigan	Field OSP4
Thu, November 21		Report		Stadium: Round Rock Multipurpose Complex; Round Rock, Texas

3:00pm CST	Central Michigan	0–4	Iowa State	Field OSP5
Thu, November 21		Report		Stadium: Round Rock Multipurpose Complex; Round Rock, Texas

3:00pm CST	Western Oregon	0–1	Vermont	Field 2
Thu, November 21		Report		Stadium: Round Rock Multipurpose Complex; Round Rock, Texas

8:00am CST	Iowa State	0–0	Vermont	Field 2
		Report		Stadium: Round Rock Multipurpose Complex; Round Rock, Texas

8:00am CST	Central Michigan	1–2	Western Oregon	Field 3
		Report		Stadium: Round Rock Multipurpose Complex; Round Rock, Texas

Group C
Pos	Team	Pld	W	D	L	GF	GA	GD	Pts	Qualification
1	Oregon	3	1	2	0	6	1	+5	5	Advanced to knockout stage
2	UMass Amherst	3	1	2	0	4	3	+1	5	
3	Notre Dame	3	1	1	1	6	4	+2	4	
4	Texas Tech	3	0	1	2	3	11	−8	1	

Scores

8:00am CST	Oregon	0–0	UMass Amherst	Field OSP5
Thu, November 21		Report		Stadium: Round Rock Multipurpose Complex; Round Rock, Texas

8:00am CST	Texas Tech	1–4	Notre Dame	Field 2
Thu, November 21		Report		Stadium: Round Rock Multipurpose Complex; Round Rock, Texas

3:00pm CST	Notre Dame	1–1	Oregon	Field OSP1
Thu, November 21		Report		Stadium: Round Rock Multipurpose Complex; Round Rock, Texas

3:00pm CST	UMass Amherst	2–2	Texas Tech	Field OSP2
Thu, November 21		Report		Stadium: Round Rock Multipurpose Complex; Round Rock, Texas

8:00am CST	Oregon	5–0	Texas Tech	Field 4
		Report		Stadium: Round Rock Multipurpose Complex; Round Rock, Texas

8:00am CST	Notre Dame	1–2	UMass Amherst	Field 5
		Report		Stadium: Round Rock Multipurpose Complex; Round Rock, Texas

Group D
Pos	Team	Pld	W	D	L	GF	GA	GD	Pts	Qualification
1	East Carolina	3	2	1	0	6	3	+3	7	Advanced to knockout stage
2	Miami (OH)	3	2	0	1	6	3	+3	6	
3	Northern Colorado	3	1	0	2	1	5	−4	3	
4	Missouri	3	0	1	2	1	3	−2	1	

Scores

9:45am CST	Missouri	0–1	Northern Colorado	Field OSP1
Thu, November 21		Report		Stadium: Round Rock Multipurpose Complex; Round Rock, Texas

9:45am CST	Miami (OH)	2–3	East Carolina	Field OSP2
Thu, November 21		Report		Stadium: Round Rock Multipurpose Complex; Round Rock, Texas

4:45pm CST	East Carolina	1–1	Missouri	Field OSP3
Thu, November 21		Report		Stadium: Round Rock Multipurpose Complex; Round Rock, Texas

4:45pm CST	Northern Colorado	0–3	Miami (OH)	Field OSP4
Thu, November 21		Report		Stadium: Round Rock Multipurpose Complex; Round Rock, Texas

8:00am CST	Missouri	0–1	Miami (OH)	Field 6
		Report		Stadium: Round Rock Multipurpose Complex; Round Rock, Texas

8:00am CST	East Carolina	2–0	Northern Colorado	Field OSP1
		Report		Stadium: Round Rock Multipurpose Complex; Round Rock, Texas

Group E
Pos	Team	Pld	W	D	L	GF	GA	GD	Pts	Qualification
1	Air Force	3	2	1	0	11	1	+7 (Note: Actual GD differs because the max GD for any one game is ±5, which came into effect when Air Force beat TAMG 8–0)	7	Advanced to knockout stage
2	Penn State	3	2	1	0	6	0	+6	7	Advanced to knockout stage
3	Kennesaw State	3	0	1	2	2	6	−4	1	
4	Texas A&M Galveston	3	0	1	2	1	13	−9	1	

Scores

9:45am CST	Penn State	4–0	Texas A&M Galveston	Field OSP3
Thu, November 21		Report		Stadium: Round Rock Multipurpose Complex; Round Rock, Texas

9:45am CST	Air Force	3–1	Kennesaw State	Field OSP4
Thu, November 21		Report		Stadium: Round Rock Multipurpose Complex; Round Rock, Texas

4:45pm CST	Kennesaw State	0–2	Penn State	Field OSP5
Thu, November 21		Report		Stadium: Round Rock Multipurpose Complex; Round Rock, Texas

4:45pm CST	Texas A&M Galveston	0–8	Air Force	Field 2
Thu, November 21		Report		Stadium: Round Rock Multipurpose Complex; Round Rock, Texas

8:00am CST	Penn State	0–0	Air Force	Field OSP4
		Report		Stadium: Round Rock Multipurpose Complex; Round Rock, Texas

8:00am CST	Kennesaw State	1–1	Texas A&M Galveston	Field OSP5
		Report		Stadium: Round Rock Multipurpose Complex; Round Rock, Texas

Notes:

Group F
Pos	Team	Pld	W	D	L	GF	GA	GD	Pts	Qualification
1	UC-Berkeley	3	3	0	0	11	0	+8 (Note: Actual GD differs because the max GD for any one game is ±5, which came into effect when UC-B beat Boston U 8–0)	9	Advanced to knockout stage
2	Colorado "Black"	3	2	0	1	5	1	+4	6	
3	Boston University	3	1	0	2	2	10	−5	3	
4	Georgia Southern	3	0	0	3	0	7	−7	0	

Scores

9:45am CST	UC-Berkeley	2–0	Georgia Southern	Field OSP5
Thu, November 21		Report		Stadium: Round Rock Multipurpose Complex; Round Rock, Texas

9:45am CST	Colorado "Black"	2–0	Boston U	Field 2
Thu, November 21		Report		Stadium: Round Rock Multipurpose Complex; Round Rock, Texas

4:45pm CST	Boston U	0–8	UC-Berkeley	Field OSP1
Thu, November 21		Report		Stadium: Round Rock Multipurpose Complex; Round Rock, Texas

4:45pm CST	Georgia Southern	0–3	Colorado "Black"	Field OSP2
Thu, November 21		Report		Stadium: Round Rock Multipurpose Complex; Round Rock, Texas

8:00am CST	UC-Berkeley	1–0	Colorado "Black"	Field 7
Fri, November 22		Report		Stadium: Round Rock Multipurpose Complex; Round Rock, Texas

8:00am CST	Boston U	2–0	Georgia Southern	Field 8
Fri, November 22		Report		Stadium: Round Rock Multipurpose Complex; Round Rock, Texas

=== Unified ===
Unified
Pos	Team	Pld	W	D	L	GF	GA	GD	Pts	Qualification
1	Tampa	2	1	1	0	12	2	+5 (Note: Actual GD differs because the max GD for any one game is ±5, which came into effect when Tampa beat SOTX 10–0)	4	Advanced to knockout stage
2	NIU	2	1	1	0	10	3	+5 (Note: Actual GD differs because the max GD for any one game is ±5, which came into effect when NIU beat SOTX 8–1)	4	Advanced to knockout stage
3	Special Olympics Texas (SOTX)	2	0	0	2	1	18	−10	0	Advanced to knockout stage

Scores

9:00am CST	NIU	8–1	SOTX	Field 1
Fri, November 22		Report		Stadium: Round Rock Multipurpose Complex; Round Rock, Texas

12:00pm CST	SOTX	0–10	Tampa	Field 1
Fri, November 22		Report		Stadium: Round Rock Multipurpose Complex; Round Rock, Texas

3:00pm CST	Tampa	2–2	NIU	Field 1
Fri, November 22		Report		Stadium: Round Rock Multipurpose Complex; Round Rock, Texas

== Tournament bracket ==
=== Men's championship ===
Sweet 16
Fri • 10:00am • Field 7
Ohio State	3
Texas A&M	1
Fri • 10:00am • Field 8
Cal Poly	3
Colorado State	1
Fri • 10:00am • Field 9
USC (a.e.t.)	3
Florida	2
Fri • 10:00am • Field 10
Wisconsin	2 (2)
Delaware	2 (4)
Fri • 12:00pm • Field 7
North Carolina	2
UC-Santa Barbara	0
Fri • 12:00pm • Field 8
Michigan State	1 (3)
Colorado	1 (0)
Fri • 12:00pm • Field 9
Michigan	2 (4)
Florida State	2 (2)
Fri • 12:00pm • Field 10
BYU	2
Drexel	0

Quarterfinals
Fri • 4:00pm • Field 5
Ohio State	2
Cal Poly	1
Fri • 4:00pm • Field 6
USC	0 (3)
Delaware	0 (4)
Fri • 6:00pm • Field 5
North Carolina	1
Michigan State	0
Fri • 6:00pm • Field 6
Michigan	0
BYU	3

Semifinals
Sat • 10:00am • Field 5
Ohio State (a.e.t.)	1
Delaware	0
Sat • 10:00am • Field 6
North Carolina	0
BYU	3

Final
Sat • 5:00pm • Field 2
Ohio State	1
BYU	3

==== Men's consolation ====
Quarterfinals
Fri • 2:00pm • Field 7
Texas Tech	3
Texas	0
Fri • 2:00pm • Field 8
Tufts	2
Colorado Mines	1
Fri • 4:00pm • Field 7
Minnesota	3
Arkansas	1
Fri • 4:00pm • Field 8
Texas Southmost	1
Iowa State	2

Semifinals
Fri • 8:00am • Field 7
Texas Tech	3
Tufts	0
Fri • 8:00am • Field 8
Minnesota (a.e.t.)	1
Iowa State	0

Final
Fri • 1:00pm • Field 7
Texas Tech	2
Minnesota	1

=== Women's championship ===
Sweet 16
Fri • 10:00am • Field 3
Ohio State	2
Illinois	0
Fri • 10:00am • Field 4
Michigan	2
Virginia Tech	1
Fri • 10:00am • Field 5
Texas	1
Cal Poly (a.e.t.)	2
Fri • 10:00am • Field 6
Clemson	1
UCLA	3
Fri • 12:00pm • Field 3
Boston College	1 (7)
Grand Valley	1 (6)
Fri • 12:00pm • Field 4
Colorado State	1
USC	0
Fri • 12:00pm • Field 5
UC-Santa Barbara	0 (3)
JMU	0 (1)
Fri • 12:00pm • Field 6
Colorado	1
Kansas	0

Quarterfinals
Fri • 4:00pm • Field 3
Ohio State	2
Michigan	0
Fri • 4:00pm • Field 4
Cal Poly	0
UCLA	1
Fri • 6:00pm • Field 3
Boston College	1
Colorado State	0
Fri • 6:00pm • Field 4
UC-Santa Barbara	0
Colorado	1

Semifinals
Sat • 10:00am • Field 3
Ohio State	3
UCLA	0
Sat • 10:00am • Field 4
Boston College (a.e.t.)	1
Colorado	0

Final
Sat • 3:00pm • Field 2
Ohio State	2
Boston College	1

==== Women's consolation ====
Quarterfinals
Fri • 2:00pm • Field 9
Cornell	2
Rice	0
Fri • 2:00pm • Field 10
North Carolina	2
Uconn	1
Fri • 4:00pm • Field 9
Wisconsin	2
Minnesota	1
Fri • 4:00pm • Field 10
Gonzaga	4
TCNJ	0

Semifinals
Fri • 8:00am • Field 9
Cornell	1
North Carolina	2
Fri • 8:00am • Field 10
Wisconsin	1
Gonzaga	4

Final
Fri • 1:00pm • Field 9
North Carolina	0
Gonzaga	1

=== Men's open ===
Quarterfinals
Fri • 6:00pm • Field 7
Virginia Tech	1
Arizona	0
Fri • 6:00pm • Field 8
Purdue	1
Cornell	0
Fri • 6:00pm • Field 9
JMU	3
Utah Valley	1
Fri • 6:00pm • Field 10
UCLA (a.e.t.)	3
Penn	2

Semifinals
Fri • 8:00am • Field 5
Virginia Tech	2
Purdue	4
Fri • 8:00am • Field 6
JMU	0
UCLA	4

Final
Fri • 1:00pm • Field 6
Purdue	2
UCLA	0

=== Women's open ===
Quarterfinals
Fri • 2:00pm • Field OSP1
Iowa State	1
East Carolina	2
Fri • 2:00pm • Field OSP2
San Diego State	1
Penn State	0
Fri • 2:00pm • Field OSP3
Air Force	0
Oregon	2
Fri • 2:00pm • Field OSP4
UC-Berkeley	2
Vermont	0

Semifinals
Fri • 8:00am • Field 3
East Carolina	1
San Diego State	0
Fri • 8:00am • Field 4
Oregon (a.e.t.)	2
UC-Berkeley	1

Final
Fri • 1:00pm • Field 4
East Carolina	0
Oregon	2

=== Unified ===
Semifinal			Final
			1	Tampa	6
2	NIU	7		NIU	2
3	SOTX	1

== Broadcasting ==
- Men's championship finals broadcast on YouTube
- Women's championship finals broadcast on YouTube
