= Round Rock Multipurpose Complex =

Sports complex in Texas

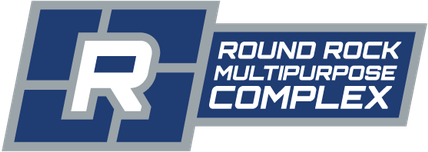

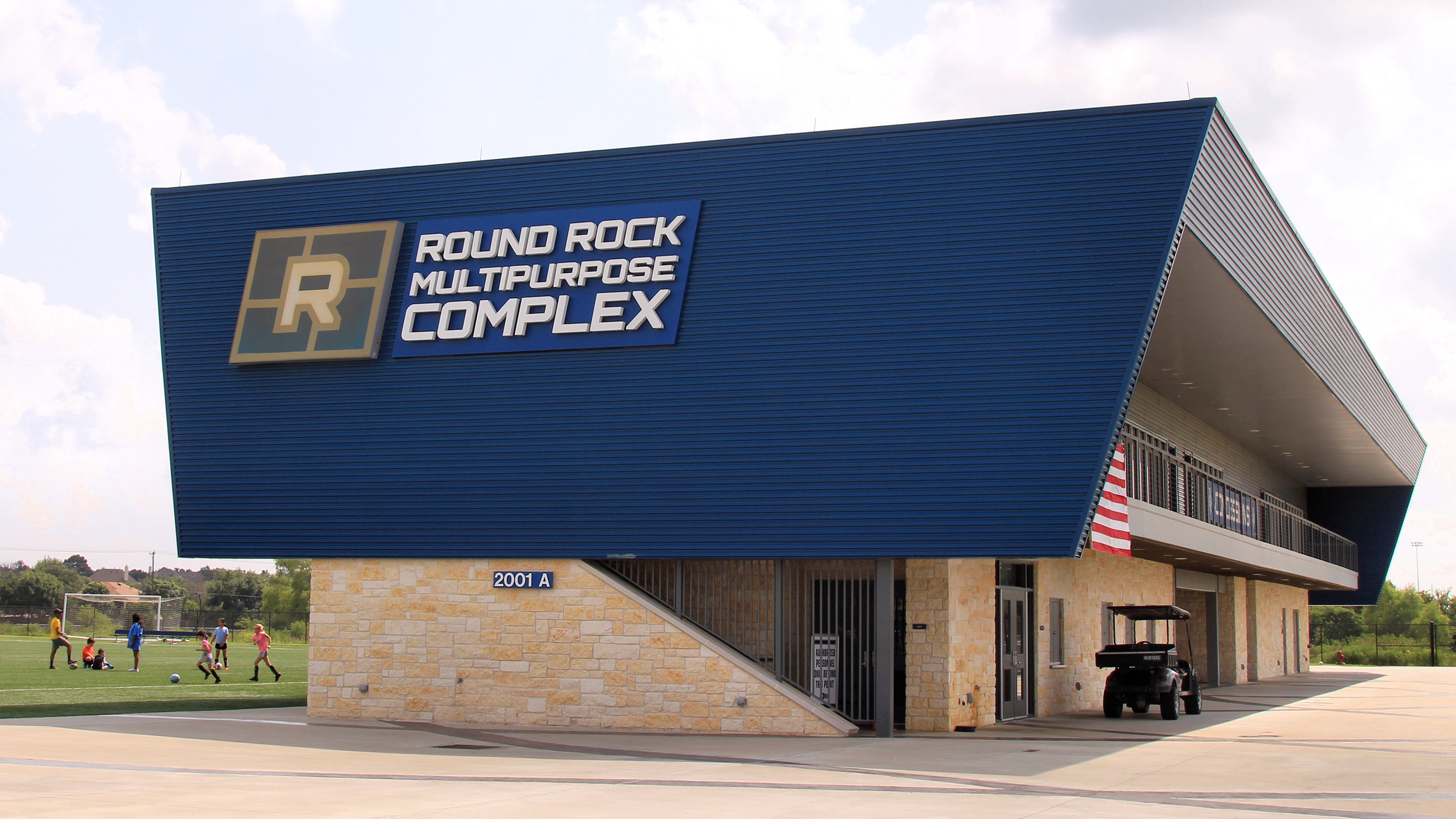
- Interactive map of Round Rock Multipurpose Complex
- Address: 2001 North Kenney Fort Blvd; Round Rock, TX 78665
- Coordinates: 30.5452°N 97.6308°W
- Type: Sports complex
- Surface: Grass/Turf
- Field shape: Rectangular

Construction
- Cost: $27 million ($35.5 million in 2025 dollars)

Tenants
- FC Austin Elite (UWS) (2016-2022); Round Rock SC (USL2) (2017-present); Austin Elite (MLR) (2018)

Website
- https://roundrockmpc.com

Round Rock Multipurpose Complex is a multi-sports complex in Round Rock, Texas, United States and was the home of the Austin Elite of Major League Rugby. It was established in 2017 and serves people being a multi-sports complex in various sports like soccer, football, basketball. skill development training, one-on-one training, backyard sports, etc.
