= Colvin Center =

Recreation center at Oklahoma State University

Coordinates: 36°07′34″N 97°04′38″W

Oklahoma State University primary logo

The Colvin Center is a student recreation center at Oklahoma State University in Stillwater, Oklahoma. It offers 240,000 square feet (22,000 m^{2}) of recreational space. The Colvin Center serves an average of 4,000 students a day. Admission to the Colvin Center is free to Oklahoma State students, although every OSU student pays a fee along with their tuition towards maintenance of the center.

== History ==
The Colvin Center was originally completed on March 1, 1969, at a cost of almost $3 million. In 1999, student government representatives had become concerned that the aging Colvin Center was becoming increasingly outdated and incapable of meeting the needs of a much larger student body. This movement would later give way to a massive two-year, $23 million renovation and expansion project that was completed in July 2004. The project gave the Colvin Center approximately 180,000 square feet (17,000 m^{2}) of completely new or renovated area, including five new gyms (bringing the total number to eleven) and a golf center with three driving-range practice nets, a practice putting green and two golf simulators. Other amenities include an indoor pool and outdoor pool, dance studios, 35-foot (11 m) climbing wall, indoor jogging tracks, racquetball courts, and cardio and fitness equipment. The weight and fitness-training areas alone have more than tripled in size from 9,000 to more than 30,000 square feet (3,000 m^{2}) with $600,000 of new equipment.

In 2005, the Colvin Center was named as one of the top six collegiate sports centers in the United States by the National Intramural and Recreational Sports Association.
