= List of The Harvard Lampoon members =

This list is of members of The Harvard Lampoon, a student satirical literary society founded in 1876.

== Writers, producers, and directors ==
- John Aboud – American screenwriter and producer
- Winthrop Ames – American theater director and producer, playwright and screenwriter
- Kurt Andersen – American novelist
- Richard Appel – American writer and producer known for his work on King of the Hill, The Cleveland Show and Family Guy
- Henry Beard – cofounder of the National Lampoon
- Robert Benchley – humorist and film actor, known for writings in Vanity Fair and The New Yorker
- John Berendt – author
- Andy Borowitz – writer and creator of the The Fresh Prince of Bel-Air
- Robert Carlock – television writer and producer
- Christopher Cerf – musician, writer and humorist
- Michael Colton – screenwriter and producer
- Greg Daniels – co-creator of King of the Hill, the American version of The Office, Parks and Recreation, and The Paper
- Jim Downey – comedy writer
- Aaron Ehasz – screenwriter and producer
- Glenn Eichler – television writer and co-creator of Daria
- Rodman Flender – movie director
- Michael K. Frith – Bermudan artist and television producer, former executive vice-president and creative director of The Jim Henson Company
- William Gaddis – novelist, author of The Recognitions and J R.
- Lisa Henson – producer and first woman elected president of Harvard Lampoon
- Justin Hurwitz – American television writer and film composer
- Walter Isaacson – American biographer and journalist, author of Einstein: His Life and Universe
- Al Jean – American producer and writer known for The Simpsons
- Douglas Kenney – American writer and actor, cofounder of the National Lampoon
- Josh Lieb – American television writer, producer and author
- David Mandel – writer and producer known for Seinfeld, Curb Your Enthusiasm, and Veep
- Edward Sandford Martin – first literary editor of Life Magazine and founding member of the Lampoon, 1877.
- Jeff Martin – American writer
- George Meyer – writer and founder of humor magazine Army Man
- Lawrence O'Donnell – American television producer, writer, pundit, and host
- Bill Oakley – American television writer and producer
- George Plimpton – American journalist, writer, literary editor, actor
- John Reed – American journalist, poet, and socialist activist, author of Ten Days That Shook the World
- Mike Reiss – American humor writer known for The Simpsons
- Simon Rich – American humorist, novelist, and screenwriter
- Thomas Parker Sanborn – American poet, model for the protagonist of Santayana's novel The Last Puritan
- Michael Schur – co-creator of Parks and Recreation, The Good Place, and Brooklyn 99
- Robert E. Sherwood – American playwright, editor, and screenwriter, speechwriter for Franklin Roosevelt
- Alex Shoumatoff – American writer
- Ernest Thayer – American writer and poet, writer of "Casey at the Bat"
- George W.S. Trow – American writer, humorist, and cultural critic
- John Updike – American novelist, poet, short story writer, art and literary critic, Pulitzer Prize winner for Rabbit is Rich and Rabbit at Rest
- Patric M. Verrone – American television writer and labor leader.
- Jon Vitti – American writer known for The Simpsons
- Josh Weinstein, American writer known for The Simpsons (Note: Although he attended Stanford University, Weinstein is an honorary member of the Harvard Lampoon, as he worked on some of Lampoon's parody publications with Bill Oakley over the summers between course years.)
- John Brooks Wheelwright – American poet, founding member of the Socialist Workers Party in the United States
- John P. Marquand – American writer
- Geneva Robertson-Dworet – American screenwriter
- Alexis Wilkinson – American writer
- Maiya Williams – American screenwriter and author
- Alan Yang – American screenwriter, producer and actor
- Steve Young – American television writer

== Academics ==
- Frederick Lewis Allen – historian and editor of Harper's Magazine
- Archibald Cary Coolidge – academic, diplomat, and co-founder of the Council on Foreign Relations
- George Santayana – Spanish-American philosopher, essayist, poet, and novelist
- Cass Sunstein – legal scholar
- F. Van Wyck Mason – American historian and novelist
- Herbert Eustis Winlock – Egyptologist

== Actors and entertainers ==
- Fred Gwynne – American actor, artist and author
- Merle Hazard – American satirical country singer and economist.
- Colin Jost – American actor, comedian, and screenwriter
- B. J. Novak – actor
- Conan O'Brien – television host, comedian, writer, and television producer

== Business executives ==
- William Randolph Hearst – American businessman, politician, and newspaper publisher.
- Robert Hoffman – co-founder of National Lampoon
- James Murdoch – British-born American businessman, the son of media mogul Rupert Murdoch.
- Hunt Wentworth – socialite and businessman in the early aviation industry

== Lawyers, politicians and government officials ==
- Curtis Guild Jr. – Governor of Massachusetts
- Roger Sherman Hoar – Massachusetts politician and science fiction author
- Elliot Richardson – American lawyer and politician, United States Attorney General
- Prince Sadruddin Aga Khan – United Nations High Commissioner for Refugees, 1966–1977
- Frederic Jesup Stimson – United States ambassador to Argentina

== Architects, musicians, sculptors and painters ==
- Carter Burwell – film composer
- Nathaniel Choate – painter and sculptor who served as vice president of the National Sculpture Society, 1922.
- Ralph Wormeley Curtis – painter and graphic artist in the Impressionist style, 1876.
- Charles Hopkinson – portraitist
- George Howe – American architect and educator
- William R. Huntington – American architect and Quaker representative to the United Nations
- Harold Weston – American modernist painter
- Edmund March Wheelwright American architect, City Architect of Boston: Lampoon's co-founder and architect of the Harvard Lampoon Castle
