= The Hunger Pains =

2012 novel by The Harvard Lampoon

First edition (publ. HarperCollins)

The Hunger Pains is a 2012 novel by The Harvard Lampoon and a parody of Suzanne Collins's The Hunger Games. It was first published on February 7, 2012, through Touchstone Books, and a cinematic book trailer was released in March of the same year.

== Plot summary ==
On the morning of Super Fun Day, Kantkiss Neverclean and her hunting partner Carol Handsomestein hunt a cow from beyond the fence before they participate in the selection ceremony. In District 12, this is the "nose game", in which whoever touches their fingers to their noses last becomes tributes. Her sister, Princess "Prin" Neverclean, is selected, but Kantkiss is volunteered to participate by Slimey Sue, who is trying to get revenge on Kantkiss. She is paired with Pita Malarkey, the baker's son who she knows as the "Boy with the Head" due to his massive head. Pita was responsible for her first sale when she was struggling to become a telemarketer to support her family after her father was killed in an explosion at the telemarketing office. Although he bought something that her company did not carry, completing this first sale helped Kantkiss become more successful.

== Reception ==
The book reached number 9 on the New York Times Best Seller list.
