= 2021 NIRSA National Soccer Championship =

- League: NIRSA
- Sport: Soccer
- Site: Foley Sports Tourism Complex; Foley, Alabama
- Duration: November 18–20, 2021
- Teams: 24
- Results: Official Results

Men's Championship Division
- Score: 3–1
- Champion: BYU (8th title, 9th title game)
- Runners-up: Texas (3rd title game)
- Season MVP: Nathan Mumford (BYU)

Women's Championship Division
- Score: 1–0
- Champion: Penn State (2nd title, 5th title game)
- Runners-up: UNC-Chapel Hill (2nd title game)
- Season MVP: Noriana Radwan (Penn State)

Men's Open Division
- Score: 1–0
- Champion: Boston College (1st title, 1st title game)
- Runners-up: Missouri (2nd title game)
- Season MVP: Irobosa Enabulele (Boston College)

Women's Open Division
- Score: 3–2 (a.e.t.)
- Champion: JMU (3rd title, 4th title game)
- Runners-up: UConn (1st title game)
- Top seed: Kaitlyn Maloney (JMU)

NIRSA national soccer championships seasons
- ← 2019 2022 →

The 2021 NIRSA national soccer championship was the 27th NIRSA National Soccer Championships, the annual national championships for United States-based, collegiate club soccer teams organized by NIRSA. It took place at the Foley Sports Tourism Complex in Foley, Alabama from Thursday, November 18 to Saturday, November 20, 2021. This was the third time the event was held here, the last being in 2018.

== Overview ==
This tournament also marked the first, in-person national tournament that NIRSA held since the COVID-19 pandemic. The last national tournament NIRSA held was flag football which had concluded 684 days prior, and the last national soccer championship concluded 727 days prior.

=== Men's championship ===
In the finals, reigning champions BYU faced 1995 champions Texas in a rematch of the 1997 finals. Prior to this, in the group stage, both teams would top their group. Despite tying their opener 0–0 to Notre Dame, a 3–0 win over UCF was enough to favorably send BYU to the round of 16 while Texas was able to defeat JMU 4–1 then Syracuse 2–0 to top their group.

In the knockout round, BYU would first defeat Syracuse 5–0 then would beat region III co-champion Cincinnati 3–1 to advance to the semifinals. Meanwhile, Texas would defeat UCF 2–0 then would beat in-state opponent Texas A&M 2–1 to advance to their first semifinal since 2010. In the semifinals, BYU would defeat 2006 champions Michigan 1–0 via a second half penalty kick from Benjamin Fankhauser while Texas would face 2018 finalist and 2015 champion North Carolina. The game would end in a 1–1 draw after regulation and overtime meaning a penalty shootout was required. Texas would win 8–7 after 9-rounds to advance to their first finals since 1995.

In the finals, BYU struck first with a goal from Michael Anderson but Texas tied the game with a goal from Nicholas Aufiero in the first half. In the second half, BYU put the game away with goals from Eli Holmstead and Adam Canfield. This 3–1 victory was BYU's eighth title, their second consecutive title, and their third title in the last four tournaments. This also meant BYU joined UC-Santa Barbara's women's team in having the most titles in a single division (8), which UCSB had sole possession of since 2011. BYU's Nathan Mumford would go on to be named the tournament's MVP.

=== Women's championship ===
In the finals, 2001 national champions and regional co-champion Penn State faced off against 2016 national runners-up and regional champions North Carolina. Prior to this, in the group stage, Penn State would win their opener 4–1 against Baylor but would fall 1–2 to Colorado State to end 2nd in their group. Meanwhile, North Carolina would defeat UCLA 1–0 and Villanova 7–1 to top their group.

In the knockout round, Penn State would first defeat UC Davis 2–1, scoring with only 8 minutes remaining then would defeat Colorado 2–0 while North Carolina would defeat Texas A&M 2–0 then would beat Wisconsin 2–1. In the semifinals, Penn State would defeat Cal Poly 2–1 in overtime following a 1–1 game in regulation while North Carolina would defeat 8-time champion UC-Santa Barbara 1–0 behind a first half goal.

In the finals, midway through the first half, eventual women's championship MVP Noriana Radwan of Penn State scored the game's lone goal from a 25-yard free kick. This 1–0 victory was Penn State's second national title and was the first time in 20 years that a Region I team claimed the women's championship title; the last being Penn State's first title in 2001.

=== Men's open ===
In the finals, Boston College face Missouri. The game was scoreless at halftime, but eventual men's open MVP Irobosa Enabulele scored the game's lone goal halfway through the second half to lead Boston College to their first open title.

=== Women's open ===
In the finals, JMU faced UConn. After trading goals throughout, the game was tied 2–2 at the end of regulation, meaning a 15 minute sudden-victory overtime was to be conducted. JMU landed the knockout blow in this overtime to gain their third open title and sole possession of the team with the most women's open championship titles.

== Format ==
The competition consisted of 96 teams: 48 men's teams and 48 women's teams. Each of these divisions were further divided into two 24-team divisions: the championship and open. The championship division divided teams into eight groups of three while the open division divided teams into six groups of four, both engaging in a round-robin tournament that determined teams able to advance to a knockout stage. Pool play games were two 40-minute halves, separated by a seven-minute halftime and utilized the three points for a win system. In the championship division, the two highest ranked teams from each group advanced to their knockout stage, with the third placed team advancing to a consolation bracket. In the open division, the top team from each group as well as the two best second placed teams advanced to their knockout stage.

Tie-breaking criteria for group play
The ranking of teams in each group was based on the following criteria in order:
1. Highest number of points
2. Winner of head-to-head competition
3. Greatest goal difference
  - Maximum ± 5 goal difference per match
4. Most goals scored
5. Most shutouts

In a tie breaking scenario involving more than 2 teams, the tiebreaker procedure would begin. If one team is identified as different and both remaining teams are still tied, the tie breaker procedure is restarted.

If a tie still remained after the first 5 criteria, the following was used to break a tie:

1. NCAA kicks from the mark
  - If there was a three-way tie, a coin-flip would be conducted. The two teams that chose the same outcome would compete in kicks from the mark between each other. The winner would compete with the last remaining team in kicks from the mark
  - If there's a four-way tie, a drawing of lots would be conducted (only could occur in open division)

Knockout stage games also consisted of two 40-minute halves. The round of 16 and quarterfinals were separated by a seven-minute halftime while the semifinals and finals had a ten minute halftime. Knockout stage games needed to declare a winner. If a knockout-stage game was tied at the end of regulation, overtime would begin. Overtime consisted of one, 15-minute, golden-goal period. If still tied after overtime, kicks from the mark would determine the winner.

== Qualification and selections ==
Each of the six regions receives three automatic bids for both the men's and women's championship that they award to its members. The final six bids are considered "at-large", and are given out by NIRSA to teams, typically based on the regional tournament results and RPI.

The 48 remaining teams participating in the open division were selected via a lottery draw that aired on YouTube on October 1, 2021 at 8am PST. Any team with membership in a NIRSA-affiliated league or with a minimum of four games played prior to the tournament were able to enter their name into the lottery. If a selected team qualified for the championship division, an alternate would take their spot. 43 men's teams and 47 women's were selected.

=== Men's championship ===
Automatic bid
Region	Method	Team	Appearance	Last Bid
I	Tournament; Co-champion	UConn	5th	2017
I	Tournament; Co-champion	Tufts	4th	2019
I	Highest RPI of remaining teams	Syracuse	1st	Never
II	Tournament; Champion	North Carolina	16th	2019
II	Highest RPI of remaining teams	Appalachian State	1st	Never
II	2nd highest RPI of remaining teams	UCF	4th	2016
III	Tournament; Co-champion	Purdue	8th	2005
III	Tournament; Co-champion	Cincinnati	7th	2018
III	Highest RPI of remaining teams	Wisconsin	6th	2019
IV	Bid-game 1 Champion	Texas	20th	2019
IV	Bid-game 2 Champion	Texas A&M	20th	2019
IV	Redemption game bid winner	Texas Tech	10th	2019
V	Pool A Winner	Minnesota	16th	2019
V	Pool A Winner	Colorado	19th	2019
V	3rd Place; Qualifier Winner	Denver	2nd	2012
VI	North Tournament; Champion	BYU	11th	2019
VI	South Tournament; Champion	UC-Davis	3rd	2018
VI	South Tournament; Runners-up	UC-Santa Barbara	12th	2019

At-large bids
Region	Team	Appearance	Last Bid
II	JMU	3rd	1997
III	Michigan	17th	2019
III	Notre Dame	1st	Never
V	Colorado State	22nd	2019
VI	Cal Poly	11th	2019
VI	Oregon	7th	2018

=== Women's Championship ===
Automatic bids
Region	Method	Team	Appearance	Last Bid
I	Tournament; Co-champion	Penn State	23rd	2017
I	Tournament; Co-champion	Villanova	1st	Never
I	Highest RPI of remaining teams	Boston College	5th	2019
II	Tournament; Champion	North Carolina	17th	2019
II	Highest RPI of remaining teams	Georgia Tech	1st	Never
II	2nd highest RPI of remaining teams	Florida	16th	2017
III	Tournament; Champion	Wisconsin	5th	2019
III	Highest RPI of remaining teams	Ohio State	20th	2019
III	2nd highest RPI of remaining teams	Illinois	15th	2019
IV	Bid-game 1 Champion	Kansas	10th	2019
IV	Bid-game 2 Champion	Arkansas	1st	Never
IV	Redemption game bid winner	Texas A&M	20th	2018
V	Pool A Winner	Colorado	26th	2019
V	Pool A Winner	Colorado State	24th	2019
V	3rd Place; Qualifier Winner	Minnesota	2nd	2019
VI	North Tournament; Champion	Washington	1st	Never
VI	South Tournament; Champion	UC-Santa Barbara	20th	2019
VI	South Tournament; Runners-up	Cal Poly	9th	2019

At-large bids
Region	Team	Appearance	Last Bid
I	Harvard	1st	Never
II	Virginia	11th	2018
III	Purdue	9th	2010
IV	Baylor	10th	2013
VI	UC-Davis	5th	2018
VI	UCLA	8th	2019

=== Men's lottery selection ===
Full men's lottery selections
Region	Team	Selection Type	Bid result
I	Towson	Automatic	Accepted
I	Harvard	Automatic	Not accepted
I	Boston College	Automatic	Accepted
I	Penn State	Automatic	Accepted
I	Penn	Waitlist	Accepted from waitlist
I	West Virginia	Waitlist	Not given
I	The College of New Jersey	Waitlist	Not given
II	Virginia	Automatic	Accepted
II	VCU	Automatic	Not accepted
II	Florida State	Automatic	Accepted
II	Georgia Southern	Automatic	Not accepted
II	Wingate	Automatic	Accepted
II	High Point	Waitlist	Accepted from waitlist
II	South Carolina	Waitlist	Accepted from waitlist
II	South Alabama	Waitlist	Not accepted
II	Virginia Tech	Waitlist	Accepted from waitlist
II	JMU	Waitlist	Not given
II	Tampa	Waitlist	Not given
III	Michigan State	Automatic	Accepted
III	Bradley	Automatic	Not accepted
III	Kent State	Automatic	Not accepted
III	Illinois	Automatic	Accepted
III	Hillsdale	Automatic	Not accepted
III	Western Michigan	Waitlist	Not accepted
III	Butler	Waitlist	Accepted from waitlist
III	Miami (OH)	Waitlist	Accepted from waitlist
III	Purdue	Waitlist	Not given
III	Wisconsin-Platteville	Waitlist	Not given
III	Grand Valley	Waitlist	Not given
III	Xavier	Waitlist	Not given
IV	LSU	Automatic	Accepted
IV	St. Edward's	Automatic	Not accepted
IV	Missouri	Automatic	Accepted
IV	Arkansas	Automatic	Not accepted
IV	Texas Tech	Waitlist	Championship
IV	Baylor	Waitlist	Not accepted
IV	Texas	Waitlist	Championship
V	Northern Iowa	Automatic	Not accepted
V	Minnesota	Automatic	Accepted
V	Colorado College	Automatic	Accepted
VI	Oregon	Automatic	Not accepted
VI	San Diego State	Automatic	Accepted
VI	UCLA	Automatic	Accepted

Participating men's lottery teams
Region	Team	Selection Type	Bid result
I	Towson	Automatic	Accepted
I	Boston College	Automatic	Accepted
I	Penn State	Automatic	Accepted
I	Penn	Waitlist	Accepted from waitlist
I	UConn "White"	Regional Tournament; Co-champion	Accepted via Tournament
II	Virginia	Automatic	Accepted
II	Florida State	Automatic	Accepted
II	Wingate	Automatic	Accepted
II	High Point	Waitlist	Accepted from waitlist
II	South Carolina	Waitlist	Accepted from waitlist
II	Virginia Tech	Waitlist	Accepted from waitlist
III	Michigan State	Automatic	Accepted
III	Illinois	Automatic	Accepted
III	Butler	Waitlist	Accepted from waitlist
III	Miami (OH)	Waitlist	Accepted from waitlist
IV	LSU	Automatic	Accepted
IV	Missouri	Automatic	Accepted
IV	Kansas	Invite	Accepted via invite
V	Minnesota "B"	Automatic	Accepted
V	Colorado College	Automatic	Accepted
VI	San Diego State	Automatic	Accepted
VI	UCLA	Automatic	Accepted
VI	Utah Valley	Invite	Accepted via invite

=== Women's lottery selection ===
Full women's lottery selections
Region	Team	Selection Type	Bid result
I	Northeastern	Automatic	Accepted
I	UConn	Automatic	Accepted
I	Boston College	Automatic	Championship
I	Penn	Automatic	Accepted
I	Cornell	Waitlist	Accepted from waitlist
I	Penn State	Waitlist	Championship
I	Vermont	Waitlist	Not given
II	Tampa	Automatic	Accepted
II	JMU	Automatic	Accepted
II	Georgia College	Automatic	Not accepted
II	Virginia Tech	Automatic	Accepted
II	Georgia Southern	Waitlist	Accepted from waitlist
III	Butler	Automatic	Accepted
III	Dayton	Automatic	Accepted
III	Western Michigan	Automatic	Not accepted
III	Ohio	Automatic	Accepted
III	Illinois	Waitlist	Championship
III	Xavier	Waitlist	Not accepted
III	Grand Valley	Waitlist	Accepted from waitlist
III	Notre Dame	Waitlist	Accepted from waitlist
III	Cincinnati	Waitlist	Not given
III	Wisconsin-Milwaukee	Waitlist	Not given
III	Bowling Green	Waitlist	Not given
III	Miami (OH)	Waitlist	Not given
III	Iowa	Waitlist	Not given
III	Michigan	Waitlist	Not given
III	Purdue	Waitlist	Not given
IV	Texas A&M-Galveston	Automatic	Accepted
IV	Texas Tech	Automatic	Accepted
IV	Texas	Automatic	Accepted
IV	St. Edward's	Automatic	Not accepted
IV	Missouri	Waitlist	Accepted from waitlist
IV	Wash U	Waitlist	Not given
IV	Creighton	Waitlist	Not given
IV	Kansas	Waitlist	Championship
V	Northern Colorado	Automatic	Not accepted
V	Colorado Mines	Automatic	Accepted
V	Colorado	Automatic	Accepted
V	Colorado State	Automatic	Championship
V	Wyoming	Waitlist	Not accepted
VI	UC-Santa Barbara	Automatic	Championship
VI	UCLA	Automatic	Not accepted
VI	UC-Berkeley	Automatic	Accepted
VI	Oregon	Automatic	Accepted
VI	Southern Cal (USC)	Waitlist	Not accepted
VI	CSU-Long Beach	Waitlist	Not accepted
VI	San Diego State	Waitlist	Not accepted

Participating women's open teams
Region	Team	Selection Type	Bid result
I	Northeastern	Automatic	Accepted
I	UConn	Automatic	Accepted
I	Penn	Automatic	Accepted
I	Cornell	Waitlist	Accepted from waitlist
I	The College of New Jersey	Invite	Accepted via invite
II	Tampa	Automatic	Accepted
II	JMU	Automatic	Accepted
II	Virginia Tech	Automatic	Accepted
II	Georgia Southern	Waitlist	Accepted from waitlist
II	Florida State	Invite	Accepted via invite
III	Butler	Automatic	Accepted
III	Dayton	Automatic	Accepted
III	Ohio	Automatic	Accepted
III	Grand Valley	Waitlist	Accepted from waitlist
III	Notre Dame	Waitlist	Accepted from waitlist
III	Iowa State	Invite	Accepted via invite
IV	Texas A&M Galveston	Automatic	Accepted
IV	Texas Tech	Automatic	Accepted
IV	Texas	Automatic	Accepted
IV	Missouri	Waitlist	Accepted from waitlist
V	Colorado Mines	Automatic	Accepted
V	Colorado "Black"	Automatic	Accepted
VI	UC-Berkeley	Automatic	Accepted
VI	Oregon	Automatic	Accepted

== Group stage ==
Results from pool play from all 4 divisions:

Tie-breaking criteria for group play
The ranking of teams in each group was based on the following criteria in order:
1. Highest number of points
2. Winner of head-to-head competition
3. Greatest goal difference
  - Maximum ± 5 goal difference per match
4. Most goals scored
5. Most shutouts

In a tie breaking scenario involving more than 2 teams, the tiebreaker procedure would begin. If one team is identified as different and both remaining teams are still tied, the tie breaker procedure is restarted.

If a tie still remained after the first 5 criteria, the following was used to break a tie:

1. NCAA kicks from the mark
  - If there was a three-way tie, a coin-flip would be conducted. The two teams that chose the same outcome would compete in kicks from the mark between each other. The winner would compete with the last remaining team in kicks from the mark
  - If there's a four-way tie, a drawing of lots would be conducted (only could occur in open division)

=== Men's championship ===
Group A
Pos	Team	Pld	W	D	L	GF	GA	GD	Pts	Qualification
1	BYU	2	1	1	0	3	0	+3	4	Advanced to knockout stage
2	UCF	2	1	0	1	2	4	−2	3	Advanced to knockout stage
3	Notre Dame	2	0	1	1	1	2	−1	1	Consolation

Scores

8:00am CST	BYU	0–0	Notre Dame	Field 2
Thu, November 18		Report		Stadium: Foley Sports Tourism Complex; Foley, Alabama

1:15pm CST	Notre Dame	1–2	UCF	Field 8
Thu, November 18		Report		Stadium: Foley Sports Tourism Complex; Foley, Alabama

6:30pm CST	UCF	0–3	BYU	Field 3
Thu, November 18		Report		Stadium: Foley Sports Tourism Complex; Foley, Alabama

Group B
Pos	Team	Pld	W	D	L	GF	GA	GD	Pts	Qualification
1	UC-Davis	2	2	0	0	6	0	+6	6	Advanced to knockout stage
2	Wisconsin	2	1	0	1	3	4	−1	3	Advanced to knockout stage
3	Colorado State	2	0	0	2	1	6	−5	0	Consolation

Scores

8:00am CST	Wisconsin	3–1	Colorado State	Field 3
Thu, November 18		Report		Stadium: Foley Sports Tourism Complex; Foley, Alabama

1:15pm CST	Colorado State	0–3	UC-Davis	Field 9
Thu, November 18		Report		Stadium: Foley Sports Tourism Complex; Foley, Alabama

6:30pm CST	UC-Davis	3–0	Wisconsin	Field 2
Thu, November 18		Report		Stadium: Foley Sports Tourism Complex; Foley, Alabama

Group C
Pos	Team	Pld	W	D	L	GF	GA	GD	Pts	Qualification
1	North Carolina	2	2	0	0	6	1	+5	6	Advanced to knockout stage
2	Texas Tech	2	0	1	1	1	3	−2	1	Advanced to knockout stage
3	Oregon	2	0	1	1	0	3	−3	1	Consolation

Scores

8:00am CST	North Carolina	3–0	Oregon	Field 8
Thu, November 18		Report		Stadium: Foley Sports Tourism Complex; Foley, Alabama

1:15pm CST	Oregon	0–0	Texas Tech	Field 2
Thu, November 18		Report		Stadium: Foley Sports Tourism Complex; Foley, Alabama

6:30pm CST	Texas Tech	1–3	North Carolina	Field 9
Thu, November 18		Report		Stadium: Foley Sports Tourism Complex; Foley, Alabama

Group D
Pos	Team	Pld	W	D	L	GF	GA	GD	Pts	Qualification
1	Texas	2	2	0	0	6	1	+5	6	Advanced to knockout stage
2	Syracuse	2	1	0	1	2	3	−1	3	Advanced to knockout stage
3	JMU	2	0	0	2	2	6	−4	0	Consolation

Scores

8:00am CST	Texas	4–1	JMU	Field 9
Thu, November 18		Report		Stadium: Foley Sports Tourism Complex; Foley, Alabama

1:15pm CST	JMU	1–2	Syracuse	Field 3
Thu, November 18		Report		Stadium: Foley Sports Tourism Complex; Foley, Alabama

6:30pm CST	Syracuse	0–2	Texas	Field 8
Thu, November 18		Report		Stadium: Foley Sports Tourism Complex; Foley, Alabama

Group E
Pos	Team	Pld	W	D	L	GF	GA	GD	Pts	Qualification
1	Texas A&M	2	2	0	0	7	0	+7	6	Advanced to knockout stage
2	Cincinnati	2	1	0	1	4	3	+1	3	Advanced to knockout stage
3	Denver	2	0	0	2	0	8	−8	0	Consolation

Scores

9:45am CST	Texas A&M	4–0	Denver	Field 2
Thu, November 18		Report		Stadium: Foley Sports Tourism Complex; Foley, Alabama

3:00pm CST	Denver	0–4	Cincinnati	Field 8
Thu, November 18		Report		Stadium: Foley Sports Tourism Complex; Foley, Alabama

8:15pm CST	Cincinnati	0–3	Texas A&M	Field 3
Thu, November 18		Report		Stadium: Foley Sports Tourism Complex; Foley, Alabama

Group F
Pos	Team	Pld	W	D	L	GF	GA	GD	Pts	Qualification
1	Cal Poly	2	2	0	0	4	2	+2	6	Advanced to knockout stage
2	Purdue	2	1	0	1	5	4	+1	3	Advanced to knockout stage
3	Appalachian State	2	0	0	2	1	4	−3	0	Consolation

Scores

9:45am CST	Purdue	2–3	Cal Poly	Field 3
Thu, November 18		Report		Stadium: Foley Sports Tourism Complex; Foley, Alabama

3:00pm CST	Cal Poly	1–0	App State	Field 9
Thu, November 18		Report		Stadium: Foley Sports Tourism Complex; Foley, Alabama

8:15pm CST	App State	1–3	Purdue	Field 2
Thu, November 18		Report		Stadium: Foley Sports Tourism Complex; Foley, Alabama

Group G
Pos	Team	Pld	W	D	L	GF	GA	GD	Pts	Qualification
1	Michigan	2	2	0	0	4	1	+3	6	Advanced to knockout stage
2	Minnesota	2	1	0	1	3	3	0	3	Advanced to knockout stage
3	Tufts	2	0	0	2	2	5	−3	0	Consolation

Scores

9:45am CST	Minnesota	0–2	Michigan	Field 8
Thu, November 18		Report		Stadium: Foley Sports Tourism Complex; Foley, Alabama

3:00pm CST	Michigan	2–1	Tufts	Field 2
Thu, November 18		Report		Stadium: Foley Sports Tourism Complex; Foley, Alabama

8:15pm	Tufts	1–3	Minnesota	Field 9
Thu, November 18		Report		Stadium: Foley Sports Tourism Complex; Foley, Alabama

Group H
Pos	Team	Pld	W	D	L	GF	GA	GD	Pts	Qualification
1	UC-Santa Barbara	2	2	0	0	8	2	+6	6	Advanced to knockout stage
2	Colorado	2	1	0	1	3	6	−3	3	Advanced to knockout stage
3	UConn	2	0	0	2	2	5	−3	0	Consolation

Scores

9:45am CST	Colorado	2–1	UConn	Field 9
Thu, November 18		Report		Stadium: Foley Sports Tourism Complex; Foley, Alabama

3:00pm CST	UConn	1–3	UC-Santa Barbara	Field 3
Thu, November 18		Report		Stadium: Foley Sports Tourism Complex; Foley, Alabama

8:15pm CST	UC-Santa Barbara	5–1	Colorado	Field 8
Thu, November 18		Report		Stadium: Foley Sports Tourism Complex; Foley, Alabama

=== Women's championship ===
Group A
Pos	Team	Pld	W	D	L	GF	GA	GD	Pts	Qualification
1	Colorado	2	2	0	0	2	0	+2	6	Advanced to knockout stage
2	Texas A&M	2	1	0	1	1	1	0	3	Advanced to knockout stage
3	Washington	2	0	0	2	0	2	−2	0	Consolation

Scores

8:00am CST	Colorado	1–0	Washington	Field 4
Thu, November 18		Report		Stadium: Foley Sports Tourism Complex; Foley, Alabama

1:15pm CST	Washington	0–1	Texas A & M	Field 10
Thu, November 18		Report		Stadium: Foley Sports Tourism Complex; Foley, Alabama

6:30pm CST	Texas A & M	0–1	Colorado	Field 5
Thu, November 18		Report		Stadium: Foley Sports Tourism Complex; Foley, Alabama

Group B
Pos	Team	Pld	W	D	L	GF	GA	GD	Pts	Qualification
1	Florida	2	2	0	0	6	1	+5	6	Advanced to knockout stage
2	Boston College	2	1	0	1	1	1	0	3	Advanced to knockout stage
3	Illinois	2	0	0	2	1	6	−5	0	Consolation

Scores

8:00am CST	Illinois	1–5	Florida	Field 5
Thu, November 18		Report		Stadium: Foley Sports Tourism Complex; Foley, Alabama

1:15pm CST	Florida	1–0	Boston College	Field 11
Thu, November 18		Report		Stadium: Foley Sports Tourism Complex; Foley, Alabama

6:30pm CST	Boston College	1–0	Illinois	Field 4
Thu, November 18		Report		Stadium: Foley Sports Tourism Complex; Foley, Alabama

Group C
Pos	Team	Pld	W	D	L	GF	GA	GD	Pts	Qualification
1	UC-Santa Barbara	2	1	1	0	2	1	+1	4	Advanced to knockout stage
2	Kansas	2	0	2	0	0	0	0	2	Advanced to knockout stage
3	Purdue	2	0	1	1	1	2	−1	1	Consolation

Scores

8:00am CST	UC-Santa Barbara	2–1	Purdue	Field 10
Thu, November 18		Report		Stadium: Foley Sports Tourism Complex; Foley, Alabama

1:15pm CST	Purdue	0–0	Kansas	Field 4
Thu, November 18		Report		Stadium: Foley Sports Tourism Complex; Foley, Alabama

6:30pm CST	Kansas	0–0	UC-Santa Barbara	Field 11
Thu, November 18		Report		Stadium: Foley Sports Tourism Complex; Foley, Alabama

Group D
Pos	Team	Pld	W	D	L	GF	GA	GD	Pts	Qualification
1	North Carolina	2	2	0	0	8	1	+6 (Note: Actual GD differs because the max GD for any one game is ±5, which came into effect when UNC beat Villanova 7–1)	6	Advanced to knockout stage
2	UCLA	2	1	0	1	6	2	+4	3	Advanced to knockout stage
3	Villanova	2	0	0	2	2	13	−10	0	Consolation

Notes:

Scores

8:00am CST	North Carolina	1–0	UCLA	Field 11
Thu, November 18		Report		Stadium: Foley Sports Tourism Complex; Foley, Alabama

1:15pm CST	UCLA	6–1	Villanova	Field 5
Thu, November 18		Report		Stadium: Foley Sports Tourism Complex; Foley, Alabama

6:30pm CST	Villanova	1–7	North Carolina	Field 10
Thu, November 18		Report		Stadium: Foley Sports Tourism Complex; Foley, Alabama

Group E
Pos	Team	Pld	W	D	L	GF	GA	GD	Pts	Qualification
1	Colorado State	2	2	0	0	5	2	+3	6	Advanced to knockout stage
2	Penn State	2	1	0	1	5	3	+2	3	Advanced to knockout stage
3	Baylor	2	0	0	2	2	7	−5	0	Consolation

Scores

9:45am CST	Colorado State	3–1	Baylor	Field 4
Thu, November 18		Report		Stadium: Foley Sports Tourism Complex; Foley, Alabama

3:00pm CST	Baylor	1–4	Penn State	Field 10
Thu, November 18		Report		Stadium: Foley Sports Tourism Complex; Foley, Alabama

8:15pm CST	Penn State	1–2	Colorado State	Field 5
Thu, November 18		Report		Stadium: Foley Sports Tourism Complex; Foley, Alabama

Group F
Pos	Team	Pld	W	D	L	GF	GA	GD	Pts	Qualification
1	Minnesota	2	2	0	0	4	1	+3	6	Advanced to knockout stage
2	Cal Poly	2	1	0	1	2	2	0	3	Advanced to knockout stage
3	Virginia	2	0	0	2	1	4	−3	0	Consolation

Scores

9:45am CST	Cal Poly	2–0	Virginia	Field 5
Thu, November 18		Report		Stadium: Foley Sports Tourism Complex; Foley, Alabama

3:00pm CST	Virginia	1–2	Minnesota	Field 11
Thu, November 18		Report		Stadium: Foley Sports Tourism Complex; Foley, Alabama

8:15pm CST	Minnesota	2–0	Cal Poly	Field 4
Thu, November 18		Report		Stadium: Foley Sports Tourism Complex; Foley, Alabama

Group G
Pos	Team	Pld	W	D	L	GF	GA	GD	Pts	Qualification
1	Georgia Tech	2	1	1	0	3	0	+3	4	Advanced to knockout stage
2	Ohio State	2	0	2	0	2	2	0	2	Advanced to knockout stage
3	Harvard	2	0	1	1	2	5	−3	1	Consolation

Scores

9:45am CST	Ohio State	2–2	Harvard	Field 10
Thu, November 18		Report		Stadium: Foley Sports Tourism Complex; Foley, Alabama

3:00pm CST	Harvard	0–3	Georgia Tech	Field 4
Thu, November 18		Report		Stadium: Foley Sports Tourism Complex; Foley, Alabama

8:15pm CST	Georgia Tech	0–0	Ohio State	Field 11
Thu, November 18		Report		Stadium: Foley Sports Tourism Complex; Foley, Alabama

Group H
Pos	Team	Pld	W	D	L	GF	GA	GD	Pts	Qualification
1	UC-Davis	2	2	0	0	3	1	+2	6	Advanced to knockout stage
2	Wisconsin	2	1	0	1	3	2	+1	3	Advanced to knockout stage
3	Arkansas	2	0	0	2	2	5	−3	0	Consolation

Scores

9:45am CST	Wisconsin	3–1	Arkansas	Field 11
Thu, November 18		Report		Stadium: Foley Sports Tourism Complex; Foley, Alabama

3:00pm CST	Arkansas	1–2	UC-Davis	Field 5
Thu, November 18		Report		Stadium: Foley Sports Tourism Complex; Foley, Alabama

8:15pm CST	UC-Davis	1–0	Wisconsin	Field 10
Thu, November 18		Report		Stadium: Foley Sports Tourism Complex; Foley, Alabama

=== Men's open ===
Group A
Pos	Team	Pld	W	D	L	GF	GA	GD	Pts	Qualification
1	Florida State	3	1	2	0	3	0	+3	5	Advanced to knockout stage
2	Michigan State	3	1	2	0	2	1	+1	5	
3	UConn "White"	3	1	1	1	8	3	+4 (Note: Actual GD differs because the max GD for any one game is ±5, which came into effect when UConn beat Kansas 8–2)	4	
4	Kansas	3	0	1	2	3	12	−8	1	

Notes:

Scores

8:00am CST	UConn "White"	8–2	Kansas	Field 13
Thu, November 18		Report		Stadium: Foley Sports Tourism Complex; Foley, Alabama

8:00am CST	Florida State	0–0	Michigan State	Field 14
Thu, November 18		Report		Stadium: Foley Sports Tourism Complex; Foley, Alabama

3:00pm CST	Michigan State	1–0	UConn "White"	Field 15
Thu, November 18		Report		Stadium: Foley Sports Tourism Complex; Foley, Alabama

3:00pm CST	Kansas	0–3	Florida State	Field 16
Thu, November 18		Report		Stadium: Foley Sports Tourism Complex; Foley, Alabama

8:00am CST	UConn "White"	0–0	Florida State	Field 10
Fri, November 19		Report		Stadium: Foley Sports Tourism Complex; Foley, Alabama

8:00am CST	Michigan State	1–1	Kansas	Field 11
Fri, November 19		Report		Stadium: Foley Sports Tourism Complex; Foley, Alabama

Group B
Pos	Team	Pld	W	D	L	GF	GA	GD	Pts	Qualification
1	Illinois	2	2	0	0	12	3	+9 (Note: Actual GD differs because the max GD for any one game is ±5, which came into effect when Illinois beat Wingate 7–0)	9	Advanced to knockout stage
2	Wingate	2	1	0	1	2	7	−1	6	Advanced to knockout stage
3	San Diego State	2	0	0	2	3	7	−2	3	
4	Unable to field team, all teams awarded 3 extra points and +2 added goal difference									

Notes:

Scores

8:00am CST	Illinois	5–3	San Diego State	Field 15
Thu, November 18		Report		Stadium: Foley Sports Tourism Complex; Foley, Alabama

3:00pm CST	San Diego State	0–2	Wingate	Field 7
Thu, November 18		Report		Stadium: Foley Sports Tourism Complex; Foley, Alabama

8:00am CST	Illinois	7–0	Wingate	Field 13
Fri, November 19		Report		Stadium: Foley Sports Tourism Complex; Foley, Alabama

Group C
Pos	Team	Pld	W	D	L	GF	GA	GD	Pts	Qualification
1	UCLA	3	2	1	0	9	2	+7	7	Advanced to knockout stage
2	Boston College	3	2	1	0	7	2	+5	7	Advanced to knockout stage
3	Miami (OH)	3	1	0	2	5	7	−2	3	
4	Virginia	3	0	0	3	1	11	−10	0	

Scores

8:00am CST	Virginia	0–5	UCLA	Field 6
Thu, November 18		Report		Stadium: Foley Sports Tourism Complex; Foley, Alabama

8:00am CST	Miami (OH)	1–3	Boston College	Field 7
Thu, November 18		Report		Stadium: Foley Sports Tourism Complex; Foley, Alabama

3:00pm CST	Boston College	3–0	Virginia	Field 13
Thu, November 18		Report		Stadium: Foley Sports Tourism Complex; Foley, Alabama

3:00pm CST	UCLA	3–1	Miami (OH)	Field 14
Thu, November 18		Report		Stadium: Foley Sports Tourism Complex; Foley, Alabama

8:00am CST	Virginia	1–3	Miami (OH)	Field 15
Fri, November 19		Report		Stadium: Foley Sports Tourism Complex; Foley, Alabama

8:00am CST	Boston College	1–1	UCLA	Field 16
Fri, November 19		Report		Stadium: Foley Sports Tourism Complex; Foley, Alabama

Group D
Pos	Team	Pld	W	D	L	GF	GA	GD	Pts	Qualification
1	Missouri	3	2	1	0	7	4	+3	7	Advanced to knockout stage
2	Penn	3	1	2	0	6	3	+3	5	
3	High Point	3	1	1	1	4	3	+1	4	
4	Butler	3	0	0	3	1	8	−7	0	

Scores

9:45am CST	Missouri	2–2	Penn	Field 13
Thu, November 18		Report		Stadium: Foley Sports Tourism Complex; Foley, Alabama

9:45am CST	High Point	2–0	Butler	Field 14
Thu, November 18		Report		Stadium: Foley Sports Tourism Complex; Foley, Alabama

4:45pm CST	Butler	1–3	Missouri	Field 15
Thu, November 18		Report		Stadium: Foley Sports Tourism Complex; Foley, Alabama

4:45pm CST	Penn	1–1	High Point	Field 16
Thu, November 18		Report		Stadium: Foley Sports Tourism Complex; Foley, Alabama

8:00am CST	Missouri	2–1	High Point	Field 6
Fri, November 19		Report		Stadium: Foley Sports Tourism Complex; Foley, Alabama

8:00am CST	Butler	0–3	Penn	Field 7
Fri, November 19		Report		Stadium: Foley Sports Tourism Complex; Foley, Alabama

Group E
Pos	Team	Pld	W	D	L	GF	GA	GD	Pts	Qualification
1	Penn State	3	3	0	0	10	2	+8	9	Advanced to knockout stage
2	Minnesota "B"	3	1	0	2	6	5	+1	3	
3	LSU	3	1	0	2	3	7	−4	3	
4	Virginia Tech	3	1	0	2	3	8	−5	3	

Scores

9:45am CST	Minnesota "B"	1–2	Virginia Tech	Field 15
Thu, November 18		Report		Stadium: Foley Sports Tourism Complex; Foley, Alabama

9:45am CST	LSU	1–2	Penn State	Field 16
Thu, November 18		Report		Stadium: Foley Sports Tourism Complex; Foley, Alabama

4:45pm CST	Penn State	3–1	Minnesota "B"	Field 6
Thu, November 18		Report		Stadium: Foley Sports Tourism Complex; Foley, Alabama

4:45pm CST	Virginia Tech	1–2	LSU	Field 7
Thu, November 18		Report		Stadium: Foley Sports Tourism Complex; Foley, Alabama

8:00am CST	Minnesota "B"	4–0	LSU	Field 4
Fri, November 19		Report		Stadium: Foley Sports Tourism Complex; Foley, Alabama

8:00am CST	Penn State	5–0	Virginia Tech	Field 5
Fri, November 19		Report		Stadium: Foley Sports Tourism Complex; Foley, Alabama

Group F
Pos	Team	Pld	W	D	L	GF	GA	GD	Pts	Qualification
1	Utah Valley	3	2	0	1	6	6	0	6	Advanced to knockout stage
2	Colorado College	3	1	1	1	4	4	0	4	
3	Towson	3	1	1	1	5	4	+1	4	
4	South Carolina	3	0	2	1	5	6	−1	2	

Scores

9:45am CST	Utah Valley	2–0	Colorado College	Field 6
Thu, November 18		Report		Stadium: Foley Sports Tourism Complex; Foley, Alabama

9:45am CST	South Carolina	1–1	Towson	Field 7
Thu, November 18		Report		Stadium: Foley Sports Tourism Complex; Foley, Alabama

4:45pm CST	Towson	4–1	Utah Valley	Field 13
Thu, November 18		Report		Stadium: Foley Sports Tourism Complex; Foley, Alabama

4:45pm CST	Colorado College	2–2	South Carolina	Field 14
Thu, November 18		Report		Stadium: Foley Sports Tourism Complex; Foley, Alabama

8:00am CST	Utah Valley	3–2	South Carolina	Field 8
Fri, November 19		Report		Stadium: Foley Sports Tourism Complex; Foley, Alabama

8:00am CST	Towson	0–2	Colorado College	Field 9
Fri, November 19		Report		Stadium: Foley Sports Tourism Complex; Foley, Alabama

=== Women's open ===
Group A
Pos	Team	Pld	W	D	L	GF	GA	GD	Pts	Qualification
1	Oregon	3	2	1	0	4	2	+2	7	Advanced to knockout stage
2	Iowa State	3	2	0	0	6	3	+3	6	
3	Penn	3	0	2	1	1	4	−3	2	
4	Butler	3	0	1	2	3	5	−2	1	

Scores

11:30am CST	Oregon	2–1	Butler	Field 13
Thu, November 18		Report		Stadium: Foley Sports Tourism Complex; Foley, Alabama

11:30am CST	Iowa State	3–0	Penn	Field 14
Thu, November 18		Report		Stadium: Foley Sports Tourism Complex; Foley, Alabama

6:30pm CST	Penn	0–0	Oregon	Field 15
Thu, November 18		Report		Stadium: Foley Sports Tourism Complex; Foley, Alabama

6:30pm CST	Butler	1–2	Iowa State	Field 16
Thu, November 18		Report		Stadium: Foley Sports Tourism Complex; Foley, Alabama

8:00am CST	Oregon	2–1	Iowa State	Field 2
Fri, November 19		Report		Stadium: Foley Sports Tourism Complex; Foley, Alabama

8:00am CST	Penn	1–1	Butler	Field 3
Fri, November 19		Report		Stadium: Foley Sports Tourism Complex; Foley, Alabama

Group B
Pos	Team	Pld	W	D	L	GF	GA	GD	Pts	Qualification
1	Dayton	3	2	1	0	2	0	+2	7	Advanced to knockout stage
2	Northeastern	3	2	0	1	2	1	+1	6	
3	Texas	3	0	2	1	1	2	−1	2	
4	Virginia Tech	3	0	1	2	1	3	−2	1	

Scores

11:30am CST	Texas	0–0	Dayton	Field 15
Thu, November 18		Report		Stadium: Foley Sports Tourism Complex; Foley, Alabama

11:30am CST	Northeastern	1–0	Virginia Tech	Field 16
Thu, November 18		Report		Stadium: Foley Sports Tourism Complex; Foley, Alabama

6:30pm CST	Virginia Tech	1–1	Texas	Field 6
Thu, November 18		Report		Stadium: Foley Sports Tourism Complex; Foley, Alabama

6:30pm CST	Dayton	1–0	Northeastern	Field 7
Thu, November 18		Report		Stadium: Foley Sports Tourism Complex; Foley, Alabama

10:00am CST	Texas	0–1	Northeastern	Field 13
Fri, November 19		Report		Stadium: Foley Sports Tourism Complex; Foley, Alabama

10:00am CST	Virginia Tech	0–1	Dayton	Field 14
Fri, November 19		Report		Stadium: Foley Sports Tourism Complex; Foley, Alabama

Group C
Pos	Team	Pld	W	D	L	GF	GA	GD	Pts	Qualification
1	Georgia Southern	3	2	1	0	4	0	+4	7	Advanced to knockout stage
2	Grand Valley	3	2	0	1	10	1	+5 (Note: Actual GD differs because the max GD for any one game is ±5, which came into effect when Grand Valley beat Texas Tech 9–0)	6	
3	Florida State	3	1	1	1	5	1	+4	4	
4	Texas Tech	3	0	0	3	0	17	−13	0	

Notes:

Scores

11:30am CST	Grand Valley	1–0	Florida State	Field 6
Thu, November 18		Report		Stadium: Foley Sports Tourism Complex; Foley, Alabama

11:30am CST	Texas Tech	0–3	Georgia Southern	Field 7
Thu, November 18		Report		Stadium: Foley Sports Tourism Complex; Foley, Alabama

6:30pm CST	Georgia Southern	1–0	Grand Valley	Field 13
Thu, November 18		Report		Stadium: Foley Sports Tourism Complex; Foley, Alabama

6:30pm CST	Florida State	5–0	Texas Tech	Field 14
Thu, November 18		Report		Stadium: Foley Sports Tourism Complex; Foley, Alabama

10:00am CST	Grand Valley	9–0	Texas Tech	Field 15
Fri, November 19		Report		Stadium: Foley Sports Tourism Complex; Foley, Alabama

10:00am CST	Georgia Southern	0–0	Florida State	Field 16
Fri, November 19		Report		Stadium: Foley Sports Tourism Complex; Foley, Alabama

Group D
Pos	Team	Pld	W	D	L	GF	GA	GD	Pts	Qualification
1	JMU	3	3	0	0	8	1	+7	9	Advanced to knockout stage
2	Cornell	3	1	1	1	3	4	−1	4	
3	Notre Dame	3	1	0	2	2	4	−2	3	
4	Colorado Mines	3	0	1	2	2	6	−4	1	

Scores

1:15pm CST	James Madison	3–0	Colorado Mines	Field 13
Thu, November 18		Report		Stadium: Foley Sports Tourism Complex; Foley, Alabama

1:15pm CST	Notre Dame	0–1	Cornell	Field 14
Thu, November 18		Report		Stadium: Foley Sports Tourism Complex; Foley, Alabama

8:15pm CST	Cornell	1–3	James Madison	Field 15
Thu, November 18		Report		Stadium: Foley Sports Tourism Complex; Foley, Alabama

8:15pm CST	Colorado Mines	1–2	Notre Dame	Field 16
Thu, November 18		Report		Stadium: Foley Sports Tourism Complex; Foley, Alabama

10:00am CST	James Madison	2–0	Notre Dame	Field 6
Fri, November 19		Report		Stadium: Foley Sports Tourism Complex; Foley, Alabama

10:00am CST	Cornell	1–1	Colorado Mines	Field 7
Fri, November 19		Report		Stadium: Foley Sports Tourism Complex; Foley, Alabama

Group E
Pos	Team	Pld	W	D	L	GF	GA	GD	Pts	Qualification
1	Tampa	3	3	0	0	6	3	+3	9	Advanced to knockout stage
2	Missouri	3	2	0	1	10	1	+9	6	Advanced to knockout stage
3	The College of New Jersey (TCNJ)	3	1	0	2	5	10	−5	3	
4	Colorado "Black"	3	0	0	3	3	10	−7	0	

Scores

1:15pm CST	TCNJ	2–3	Tampa	Field 15
Thu, November 18		Report		Stadium: Foley Sports Tourism Complex; Foley, Alabama

1:15pm CST	Missouri	5–0	Colorado "Black"	Field 16
Thu, November 18		Report		Stadium: Foley Sports Tourism Complex; Foley, Alabama

8:15pm CST	Colorado "Black"	2–3	TCNJ	Field 6
Thu, November 18		Report		Stadium: Foley Sports Tourism Complex; Foley, Alabama

8:15pm CST	Tampa	1–0	Missouri	Field 7
Thu, November 18		Report		Stadium: Foley Sports Tourism Complex; Foley, Alabama

10:00am CST	TCNJ	0–5	Missouri	Field 2
Fri, November 19		Report		Stadium: Foley Sports Tourism Complex; Foley, Alabama

10:00am CST	Colorado "Black"	1–2	Tampa	Field 3
Fri, November 19		Report		Stadium: Foley Sports Tourism Complex; Foley, Alabama

Group F
Pos	Team	Pld	W	D	L	GF	GA	GD	Pts	Qualification
1	UConn	3	2	1	0	16	1	+10 (Note: Actual GD differs because the max GD for any one game is ±5, which came into effect when UConn beat TAMG 10–0)	7	Advanced to knockout stage
2	UC-Berkeley	3	2	1	0	15	2	+9 (Note: Actual GD differs because the max GD for any one game is ±5, which came into effect when UC-B beat TAMG 10–1)	7	Advanced to knockout stage
3	Ohio	3	1	0	2	2	9	−7	3	
4	Texas A&M Galveston	3	0	0	3	1	22	−12	0	

Notes:

Scores

1:15pm CST	UConn	5–0	Ohio	Field 6
Thu, November 18		Report		Stadium: Foley Sports Tourism Complex; Foley, Alabama

1:15pm CST	UC-Berkeley	10–1	Texas A&M Galveston	Field 7
Thu, November 18		Report		Stadium: Foley Sports Tourism Complex; Foley, Alabama

8:15pm CST	Texas A&M Galveston	0–10	UConn	Field 13
Thu, November 18		Report		Stadium: Foley Sports Tourism Complex; Foley, Alabama

8:15pm CST	Ohio	0–4	UC-Berkeley	Field 14
Thu, November 18		Report		Stadium: Foley Sports Tourism Complex; Foley, Alabama

10:00am CST	UConn	1–1	UC-Berkeley	Field 4
Fri, November 19		Report		Stadium: Foley Sports Tourism Complex; Foley, Alabama

10:00am CST	Texas A&M Galveston	0–2	Ohio	Field 5
Fri, November 19		Report		Stadium: Foley Sports Tourism Complex; Foley, Alabama

== Tournament bracket ==
=== Men's championship ===
Sweet 16
Fri • 10:00AM • Field 8
BYU	5
Syracuse	0
Fri • 10:00AM • Field 9
UC-Santa Barbara	1
Cincinnati	2
Fri • 10:00AM • Field 10
Michigan	4
Purdue	0
Fri • 10:00AM • Field 11
UC-Davis	3
Texas Tech	0
Fri • 1:00PM • Field 8
North Carolina	1
Wisconsin	0
Fri • 1:00PM • Field 9
Cal Poly	0 (2)
Minnesota (pen.)	0 (4)
Fri • 1:00PM • Field 10
Texas A&M	2
Colorado	1
Fri • 1:00PM • Field 11
Texas	2
UCF	0

Quarterfinals
Fri • 5:00PM • Field 13
BYU	3
Cincinnati	1
Fri • 5:00PM • Field 14
Michigan	3
UC-Davis	0
Fri • 7:00PM • Field 13
North Carolina	1
Minnesota	0
Fri • 7:00PM • Field 14
Texas A&M	0
Texas	1

Semifinals
Sat • 10:00AM • Field 4
BYU	1
Michigan	0
Sat • 10:00AM • Field 5
North Carolina	1 (7)
Texas (pen.)	1 (8)

Final
Sat • 3:00PM • Field 1
BYU	3
Texas	1

==== Men's consolation ====
Quarterfinals
Fri • 5:00PM • Field 10
Notre Dame	2
Denver	1
Fri • 5:00PM • Field 11
Appalachian State	0
Colorado State	6
Fri • 5:00PM • Field 15
Oregon	2
Tufts	1
Fri • 5:00PM • Field 16
UConn	4
JMU	2

Semifinals
Sat • 8:00AM • Field 13
Notre Dame	1
Colorado State	3
Sat • 8:00 AM • Field 14
Oregon	0 (5)
UConn	0 (4)

Final
Sat • 1:00 PM • Field 8
Colorado State	1
Oregon	0

=== Women's championship ===
Sweet 16
Fri • 1:00PM • Field 2
Colorado	0 (4)
UCLA	0 (3)
Fri • 1:00PM • Field 3
UC-Davis	1
Penn State	2
Fri • 1:00PM • Field 4
Georgia Tech	1
Cal Poly	2
Fri • 1:00PM • Field 5
Florida	2
Kansas	1
Fri • 1:00PM • Field 13
UC-Santa Barbara	2
Boston College	1
Fri • 1:00PM • Field 14
Minnesota	1
Ohio State	3
Fri • 1:00PM • Field 15
Colorado State	0
Wisconsin	1
Fri • 1:00PM • Field 16
North Carolina	2
Texas A&M	0

Quarterfinals
Fri • 7:00PM • Field 2
Colorado	0
Penn State	2
Fri • 7:00PM • Field 3
Cal Poly	1
Florida	0
Fri • 7:00PM • Field 8
UC-Santa Barbara	3
Ohio State	0
Fri • 7:00PM • Field 9
Wisconsin	1
North Carolina	2

Semifinals
Sat • 10:00AM • Field 2
Penn State (a.e.t)	2
Cal Poly	1
Sat • 10:00AM • Field 3
UC-Santa Barbara	0
North Carolina	1

Final
Sat • 5:00PM • Field 1
Penn State	1
North Carolina	0

==== Women's consolation ====
Quarterfinals
Fri • 3:00PM • Field 13
Washington	2
Baylor	0
Fri • 3:00PM • Field 14
Virginia	4
Illinois	1
Fri • 3:00PM • Field 15
Purdue	3
Harvard	1
Fri • 3:00PM • Field 16
Arkansas	2
Villanova	3

Semifinals
Sat • 8:00AM • Field 15
Washington	1
Virginia	0
Sat • 8:00AM • Field 16
Purdue	0
Villanova	1

Final
Sat • 1:00PM • Field 11
Washington	1
Villanova	0

=== Men's open ===
Quarterfinals
Fri • 3:00PM • Field 8
Illinois	2
Utah Valley State (a.e.t)	3
Fri • 3:00PM • Field 9
Penn State	0
Boston College	1
Fri • 3:00PM • Field 10
UCLA	1
Florida State	3
Fri • 3:00PM • Field 11
Missouri	4
Wingate	0

Semifinals
Sat • 8:00AM • Field 4
Utah Valley	1
Boston College	2
Sat • 8:00AM • Field 5
Florida State	0 (3)
Missouri	0 (4)

Final
Sat • 1:00PM • Field 9
Boston College	1
Missouri	0

=== Women's open ===
Quarterfinals
Fri • 5:00PM • Field 2
Tampa	1
Oregon	3
Fri • 5:00PM • Field 3
JMU	2
UC-Berkeley	0
Fri • 5:00PM • Field 8
UConn	4
Dayton	3
Fri • 5:00PM • Field 9
Georgia Southern	0
Missouri	2

Semifinals
Sat • 8:00AM • Field 2
Oregon	0
JMU	3
Sat • 8:00AM • Field 3
UConn	0 (5)
Missouri	0 (3)

Final
Sat • 1:00PM • Field 10
JMU	3
UConn	2

== All-tournament teams ==
Note: Only semifinalist players were eligible for selections

Key
MVP
Best goalkeeper

=== Men's championship ===
#	Name	Team
4	Nathan Mumford	BYU
24	Tag Wilson	BYU
2	Pablo Carbajo	Texas
10	Samuel Loyack	North Carolina
14	Griffin Garcia	BYU
5	Alex Kim	Michigan
7	Eli Holmstead	BYU
8	Nicholas Aufiero	Texas
11	Calvin Ryan	North Carolina
6	David Woodruff	Michigan
7	Zafin Patel	Texas
16	Michael Anderson	BYU
Outstanding sportsmanship
Illinois

=== Women's championship ===
#	Name	Team
21	Noriana Radwan	Penn State
3	Emma Joyce	Penn State
8	Gianna Albenese	Penn State
88	Mary Griswald	Penn State
26	Hope Ingram	North Carolina
19	Avery Look	North Carolina
24	Bethel Belayheh	North Carolina
11	Kaitlyn Bloom	Penn State
4	Micah King	North Carolina
11	Jordan Rosen	UC-Santa Barbara
15	Michaela Boyd	Cal Poly
11	Emilie D'Agostino	Cal Poly
Outstanding sportsmanship
Villanova

=== Men's open ===
#	Name	Team
10	Irobosa Enabulele	Boston College
99	Ryan Fairlie	Boston College
18	John Hudson Anderson	Utah Valley
12	Will Johnson	Florida State
9	In Sub Chung	Penn State
9	Markus Raad	UCLA
13	Parker Hawks	Utah Valley
7	Carson Politte	Missouri
10	Ethan Garamella	Missouri
16	Shrey Sharma	Boston College
3	Lucas Ojea	Boston College
11	Orobosa Enabulele	Boston College

=== Women's open ===
#	Name	Team
12	Kaitlyn Maloney	JMU
00	Caroline Barnes	JMU
3	Audrey Bachman	Oregon
4	Lauren Rubenstein	Oregon
13	Ellie Mundwiller	Missouri
6	Sam Courtois	Missouri
5	Emma Legg	UConn
17	Ashley Yang	UConn
14	Kaila Lujambio	UConn
7	Abby Urban	JMU
19	Allie Walsh	JMU
27	Julia Ritter	JMU

== Broadcasting ==
- Men's championship finals were live streamed to YouTube
- Women's championship finals were live streamed to YouTube
