= Merle Hazard =

American economics-inclined country music singer (born 1961)

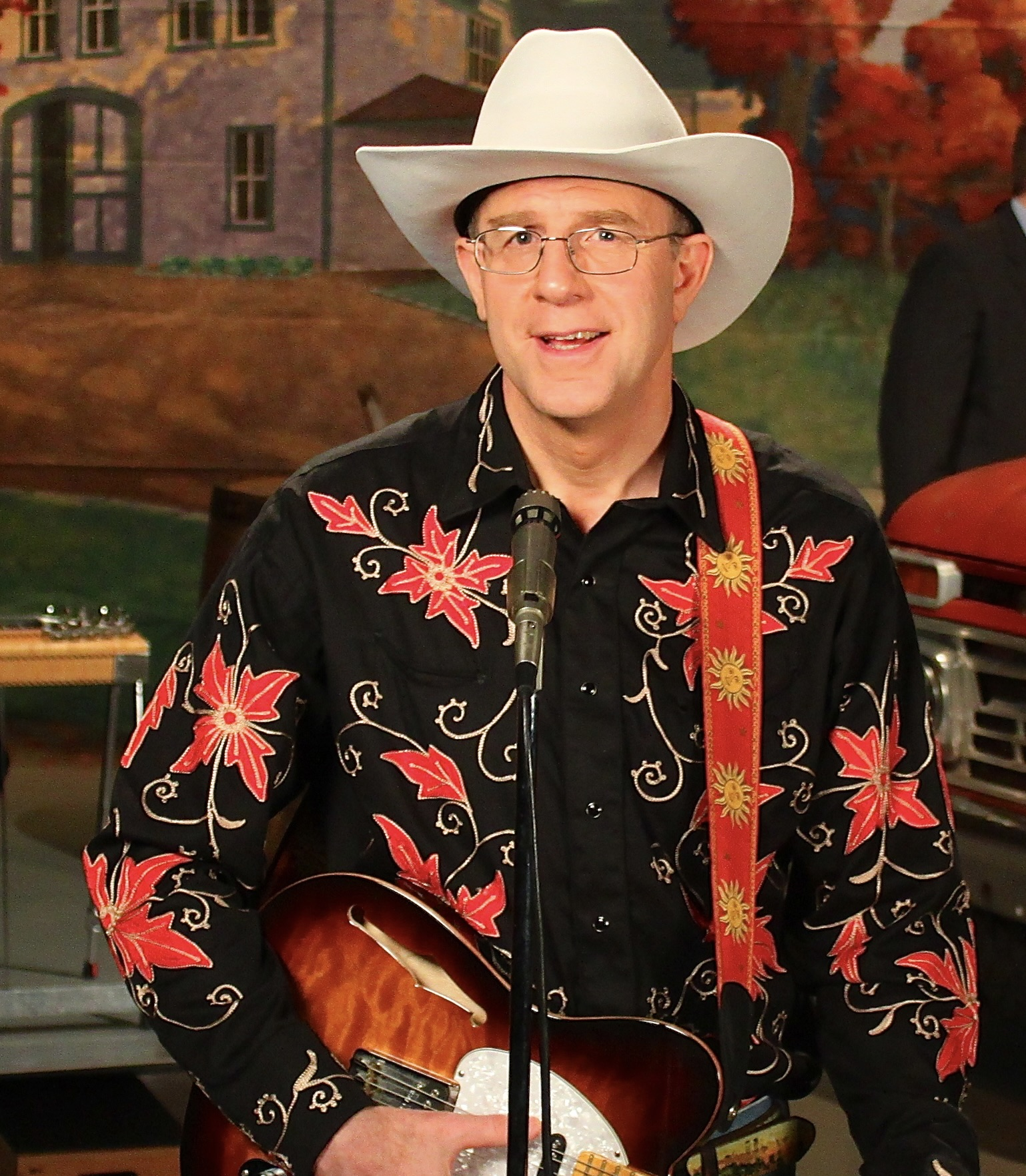
- Merle Hazard in 2013

Background information
- Born: Jonathan A. Shayne; 1961 (age 64–65)
- Origin: Nashville, U.S.
- Genres: Country music, novelty, satire
- Years active: 2007–present
- Website: merlehazard.com

Merle Hazard (born Jonathan A. Shayne) is an American satirist known for penning and performing country songs about unconventional topics, including economics, atonal music, and physics. Shayne started releasing music as Merle Hazard in 2007, his stage name a pun on the economic phenomenon moral hazard and the country singer Merle Haggard. In 2009, the Nashville Business Journal dubbed him "the 'Weird Al' of Wall Street."

== Career ==
In the summer of 2007, Hazard gained internet fame for his first single, "H-E-D-G-E," a song about uninsured loss inspired by Tammy Wynette's 1968 single “D-I-V-O-R-C-E.” The song's homemade music video, which featured Hazard in rented cowboy duds, spread on YouTube and various financial blogs. In November 2007, The New York Times called it "the only country song about the subprime meltdown and its effects on the global credit markets."

Since Hazard's initial success, he has released over a dozen songs, most of which deal with economics and other academic themes. Hazard has performed live several times, including at events hosted by Bloomberg and the American Economic Association. A number of prominent economists have shared or commented on Hazard's songs, including Greg Mankiw, Simon Johnson, Kenneth Rogoff, Arthur Laffer, John B. Taylor, and Paul Krugman.

"I like poking fun at the Fed in my songs, but actually, I respect them and think they have a nearly impossible job," Hazard told Axios in 2021.

In 2019, Hazard released "(Gimme Some of That) Ol' Atonal Music," which explores music theory and atonality in its lyrics. New Yorker music critic Alex Ross dubbed it "song of the year." The single features Grammy-winning bluegrass musician Alison Brown as banjo soloist and producer; The Washington Post has referred to Brown as "one of the leading five-string banjo players in the country."

== Personal life ==
Shayne's father was an advertising executive and businessman who did not write music, although he did sing with Tom Lehrer during graduate school. Shayne studied philosophy at Harvard College where he wrote for The Harvard Lampoon with Conan O'Brien. Shayne took a year off from his undergraduate studies to enroll in extension-division courses at the Mannes School of Music in New York; he also played in a pop band called "The Young Nashvillians." He later received a Juris Doctor degree from Vanderbilt University.

Shayne works as a money manager at Shayne & Co., LLC in Nashville, Tennessee, which he opened in 1995. The boutique investment firm managed $120 million as of 2007. He is married to Ann Shayne, a writer, with whom he has two sons.

== Discography ==
=== Singles ===
Title	Year	Album
H-E-D-G-E	2007	
In The Hamptons	2007	Tough Market
Green With Envy	2008	
Mark to Market	2009	Tough Market
Inflation or Deflation?	2009	
Old Time Recession	2009	
Double Dippin'	2010	Tough Market
The Ballad of Diamond Jim	2011	Tough Market
German Song	2011	Tough Market
Italian Song	2011	Tough Market
Fiscal Cliff	2012	Tough Market
The Great Unwind	2013	Tough Market
Dual Mandate	2014	Tough Market
How Long (Will Interest Rates Stay Low)	2016	Tough Market
Dave's Song	2018	
(Gimme Some of That) Ol' Atonal Music	2019	
The Fed Is Watching The Market	2021	
Executive Privilege	2022	
Time With You	2022	
