= Oak Square School =

- U.S. National Register of Historic Places
- Boston Landmark
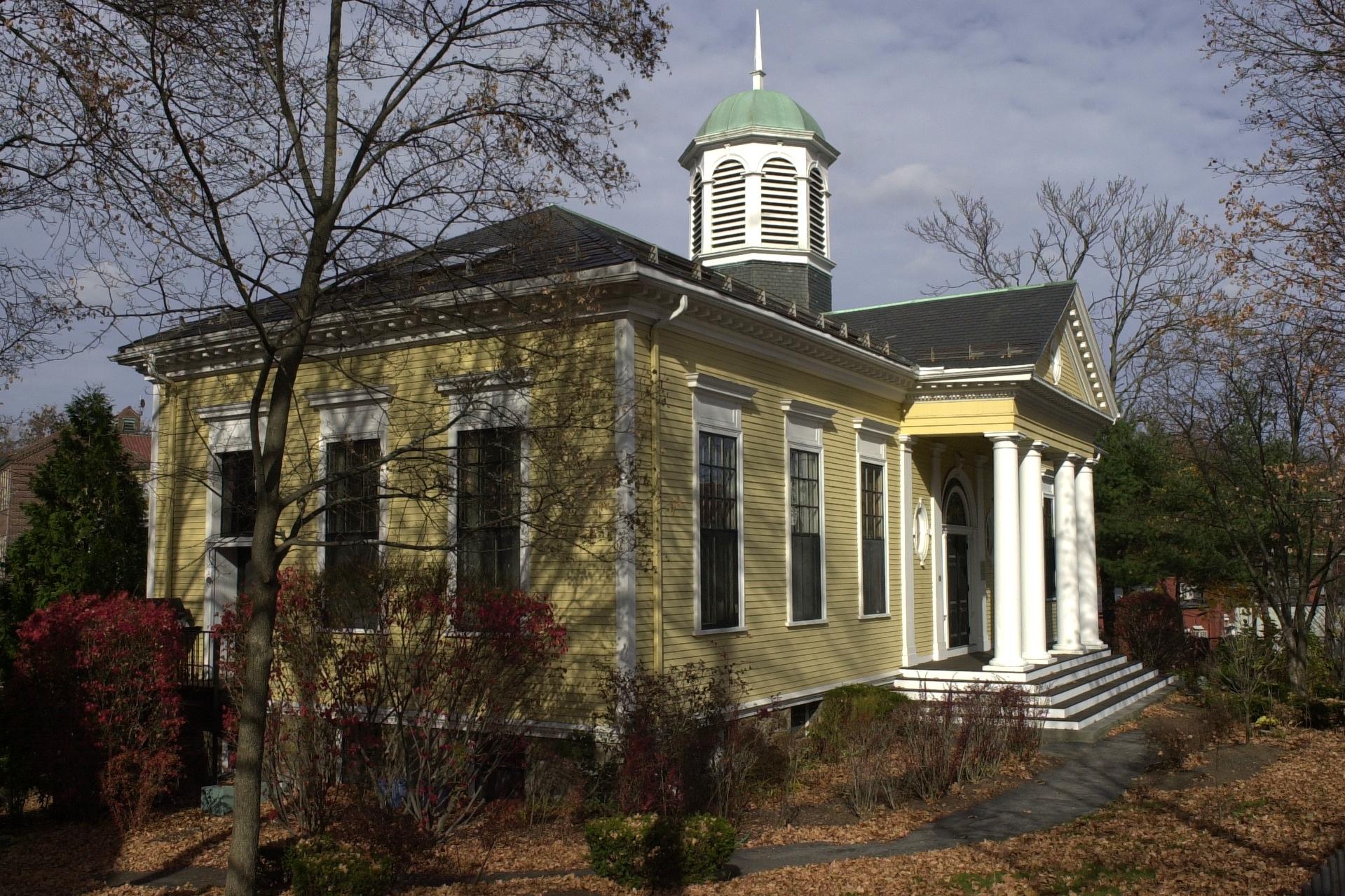

- Location within Massachusetts Location within the United States
- Location: 35 Nonantum St., Boston, Massachusetts
- Coordinates: 42°21′00″N 71°10′08″W
- Area: less than one acre
- Built: 1894
- Architect: Edmund March Wheelwright
- Architectural style: Colonial Revival
- NRHP reference No.: 80000465

Significant dates
- Added to NRHP: November 10, 1980
- Designated BOSL: April 10, 1979

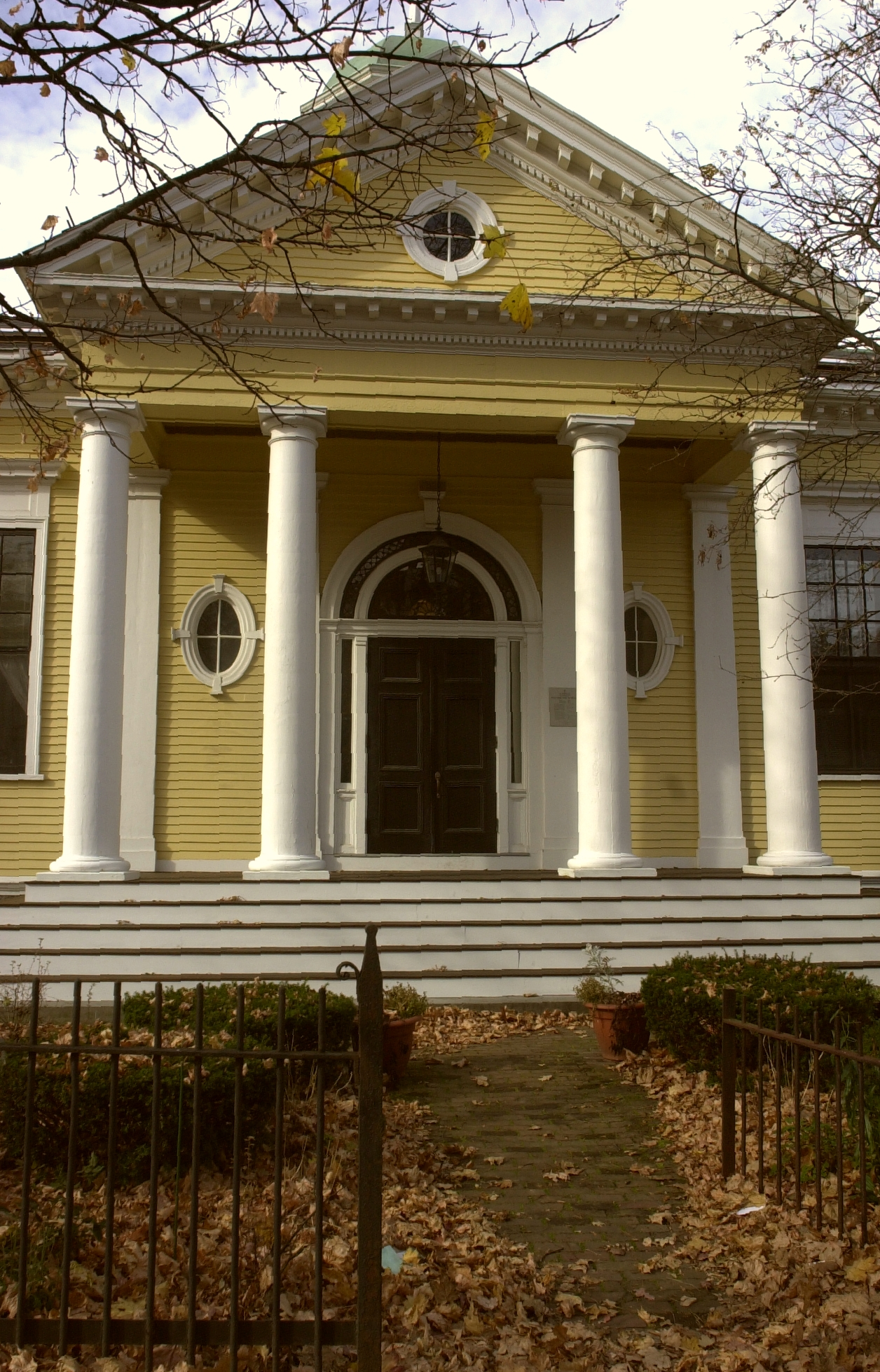

Oak Square School is a historic school building at 35 Nonantum Street in Brighton, Massachusetts, a neighborhood of Boston, Massachusetts.

The school was designed by Edmund March Wheelwright, who designed a wide variety of Boston landmark buildings. It was built in 1894 on the site of Breck Gardens and had a major addition in 1923. When it closed in 1981, it was the last wood schoolhouse in Boston. It was converted to housing in 1984.

It was designated a Boston Landmark by the Boston Landmarks Commission in 1979 and added to the National Register of Historic Places in 1980.

== See also ==
- National Register of Historic Places listings in southern Boston, Massachusetts
