= Harvard Lampoon Building =

Clubhouse in Cambridge, Massachusetts

- U.S. National Register of Historic Places
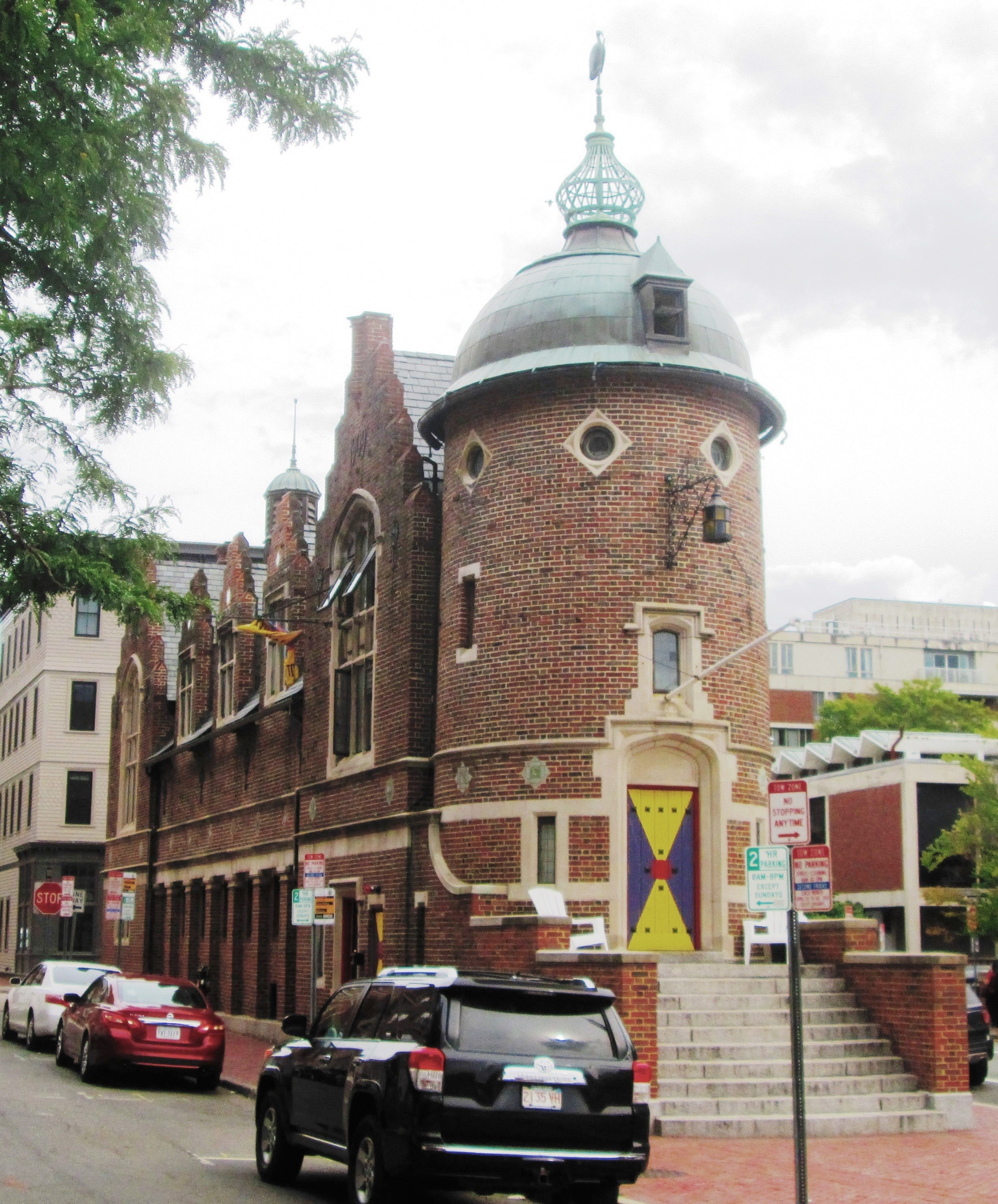
- (2017)
- Location: 44 Bow Street; Cambridge, Massachusetts
- Coordinates: 42°22′17.8″N 71°7′2.5″W
- Built: 1909
- Architect: Edmund M. Wheelwright
- Architectural style: Mock Flemish
- NRHP reference No.: 78000440
- Added to NRHP: March 30, 1978

The Harvard Lampoon Building (sometimes referred to as the Lampoon Castle) is a historic building in Cambridge, Massachusetts, which is best known as the home of The Harvard Lampoon, and for its unusual design.

== Architecture and design ==
The building in 1912

The building was constructed at 44 Bow Street not far from Harvard Yard and close to the "Gold Coast" of residences for undergraduates of Harvard College before the creation of Harvard's "house system" (some of them now part of Adams House). Designed by Edmund M. Wheelwright, who also oversaw the construction, it was first opened on February 19, 1909. Wheelwright had attended Harvard University and was one of the founders of the Harvard Lampoon. Wheelwright's design was inspired in part by an old church in Jamestown, Virginia, and by the Flemish Renaissance details of Auburn Street buildings in its vicinity. The building has been described as a "Satirical Castle".

During the construction phase of the project Wheelwright traveled to Europe to procure appropriate furnishings and windows. He purchased leaded windows in Belgium and an Elizabethan mantelpiece in England. The building also features 17th-century Delft tiles that were imported from the Netherlands. The Delft tiles are blue, white, and aubergine. The tiles were used in a room with an open ceiling and plain furniture and timbers.

The ground floor features a small entrance and a round library used for editorial meetings. The floor opens up and there is a secret chamber beneath the library (a "basement") used for "secret" events.

The building features a copper ibis, symbol of the Lampoon, mounted on the top of the dome. The statue is roughly 4 feet (1.2 m) high and weighs roughly 70 pounds (32 kg). Though it was first installed in 1909, it has frequently been stolen and returned ever since. On one occasion members of The Harvard Crimson, the student newspaper and rival of the Lampoon, which issues an annual Crimson parody issue, stole the statue and presented it as a gift to the Russian delegation to the UN. After initially promising to install it on top of a building at Moscow State University, the delegation returned the statue.

The building cost approximately $40,000 to construct, making it then the most expensive headquarters of a college newspaper in the United States. After the building was first constructed, it initially hosted a small store on the ground floor in addition to the Harvard Lampoon offices and meeting spaces on the other floors; for years the site housed a used book shop, Starr Books.

In 2023 a major restoration project led to the installation of a second fire escape to the building, numerous structural repairs, and the return of Ludowici tile to the roof decades after its removal in the mid-1950s.

== Reception ==
Barrett Wendell once described the building as "sturdily honest as the founder who designed it, yet laughing at every turn with freakish gayety and beauty." However, the building's architecture has been criticized, most notably by former Cambridge mayor Alfred Vellucci. He once described it as "one of the ugliest buildings in the world" and claimed that "it does nothing but scare strangers" and "looks like a witch on a broomstick." He also noted that the location of the building "is an ideal spot for a restroom", and once unsuccessfully proposed a city ordinance declaring the building a public urinal.

The building was added to the National Register of Historic Places in 1978.

== Foliage ==
Vellucci later clashed with the Harvard Lampoon due to a tree that he planted on city land in front of the building in 1961 in order to block the view of the building. He wished to obscure the face of the building because he found it ugly and to avenge local Italian Americans, whom he believed the Lampoon had insulted by claiming that an Irishman (rather than the Italian Christopher Columbus) discovered America. Vellucci's opposition was also fueled in part by the proposal from members of the Harvard Lampoon to rename a nearby intersection "Lampoon Square", and by the satirical portraits of Vellucci that they published.

During the sixties, seventies, and eighties the tree was routinely vandalized, its branches often chopped off and acid was poured on the tree twice. However, in 1991 the tree was completely chopped down. The Harvard Lampoon refused to confirm or deny involvement in the event and a smaller tree was planted in its place. Three years later the tree was felled on the night of Harvard's commencement. The leadership of the Harvard Lampoon denied any complicity, and suggested that it may have been a false flag operation by members of the Harvard Crimson.

== Gallery ==
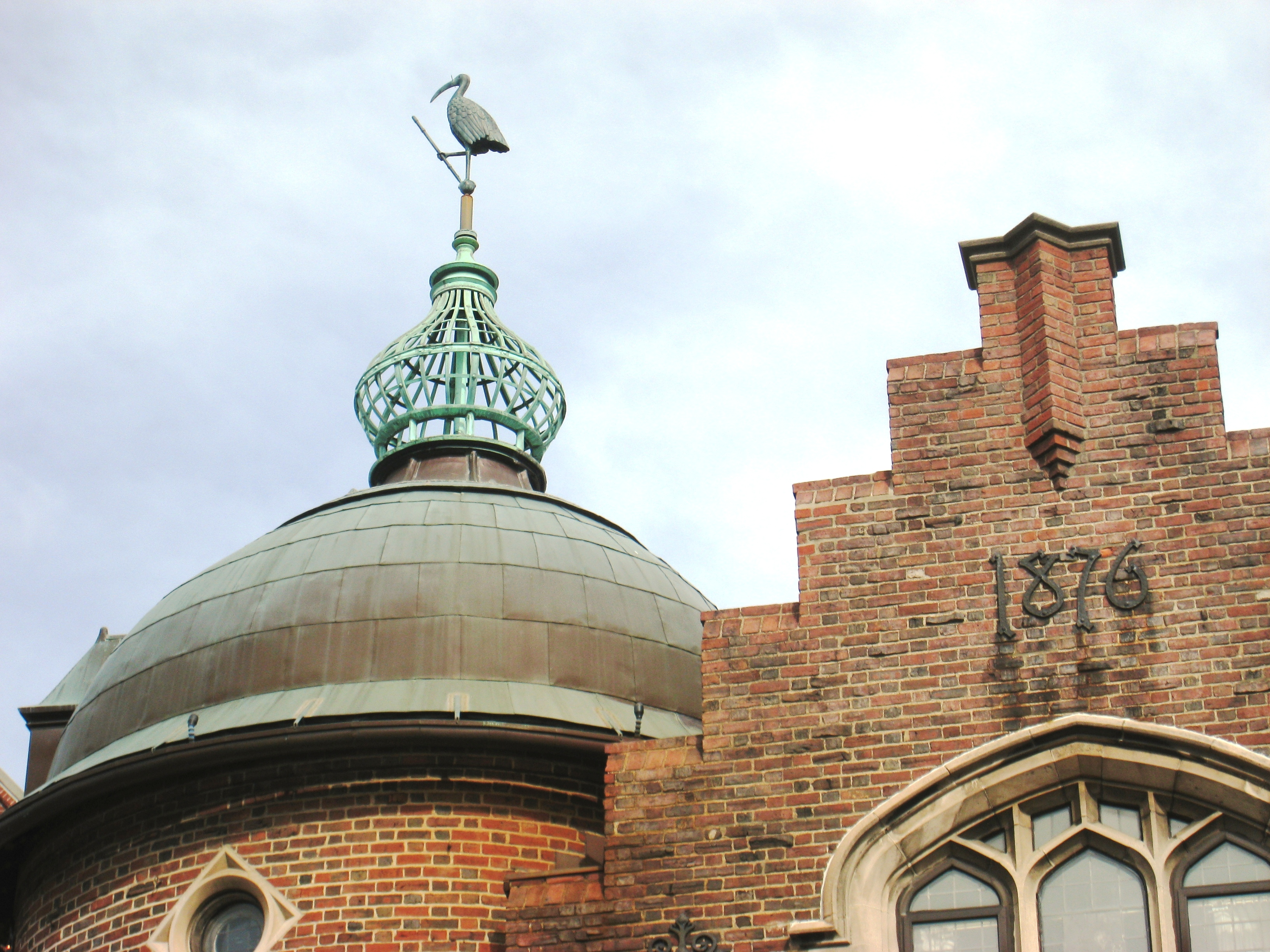
View of Ibis on dome

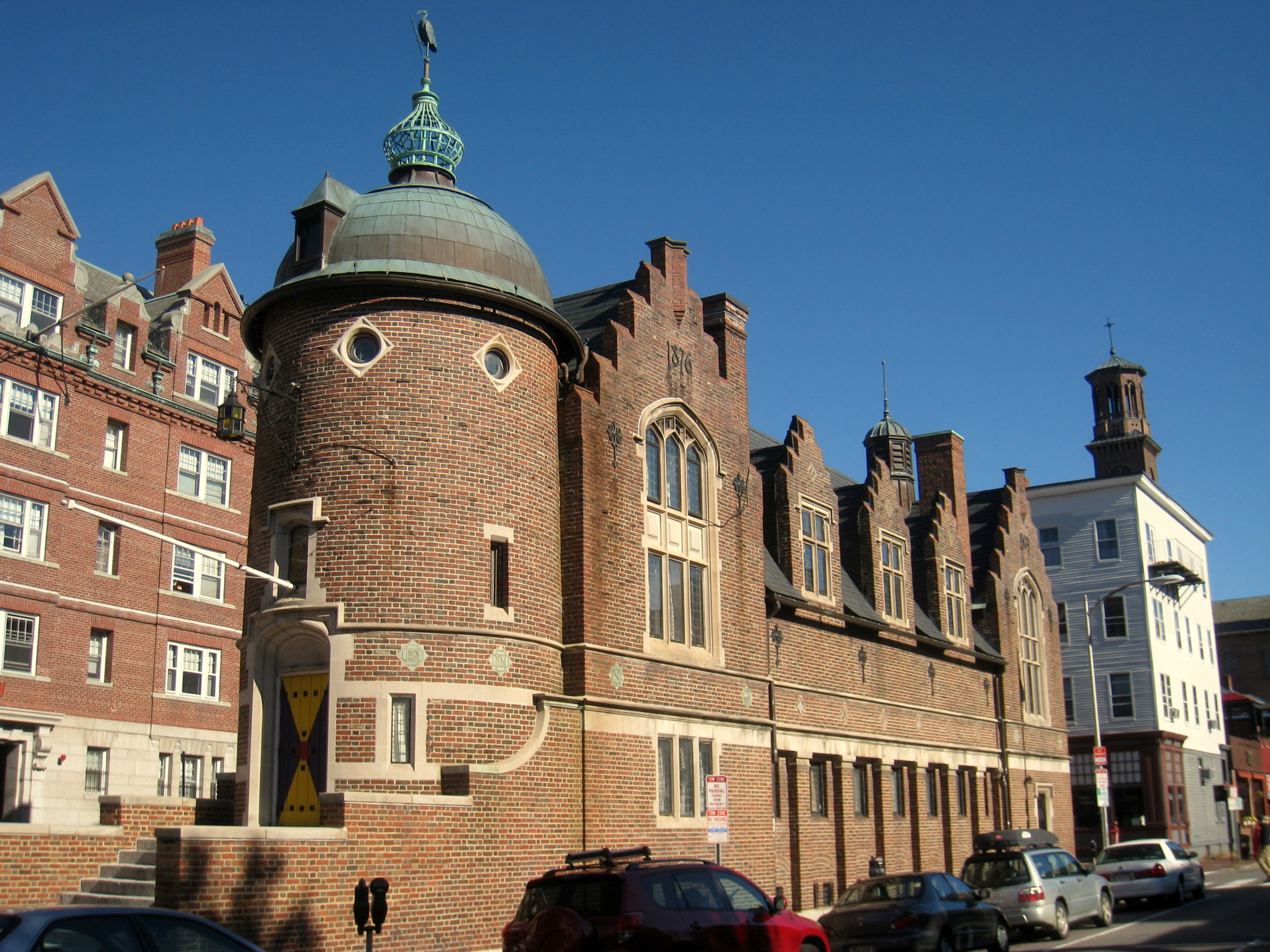
Side view of building

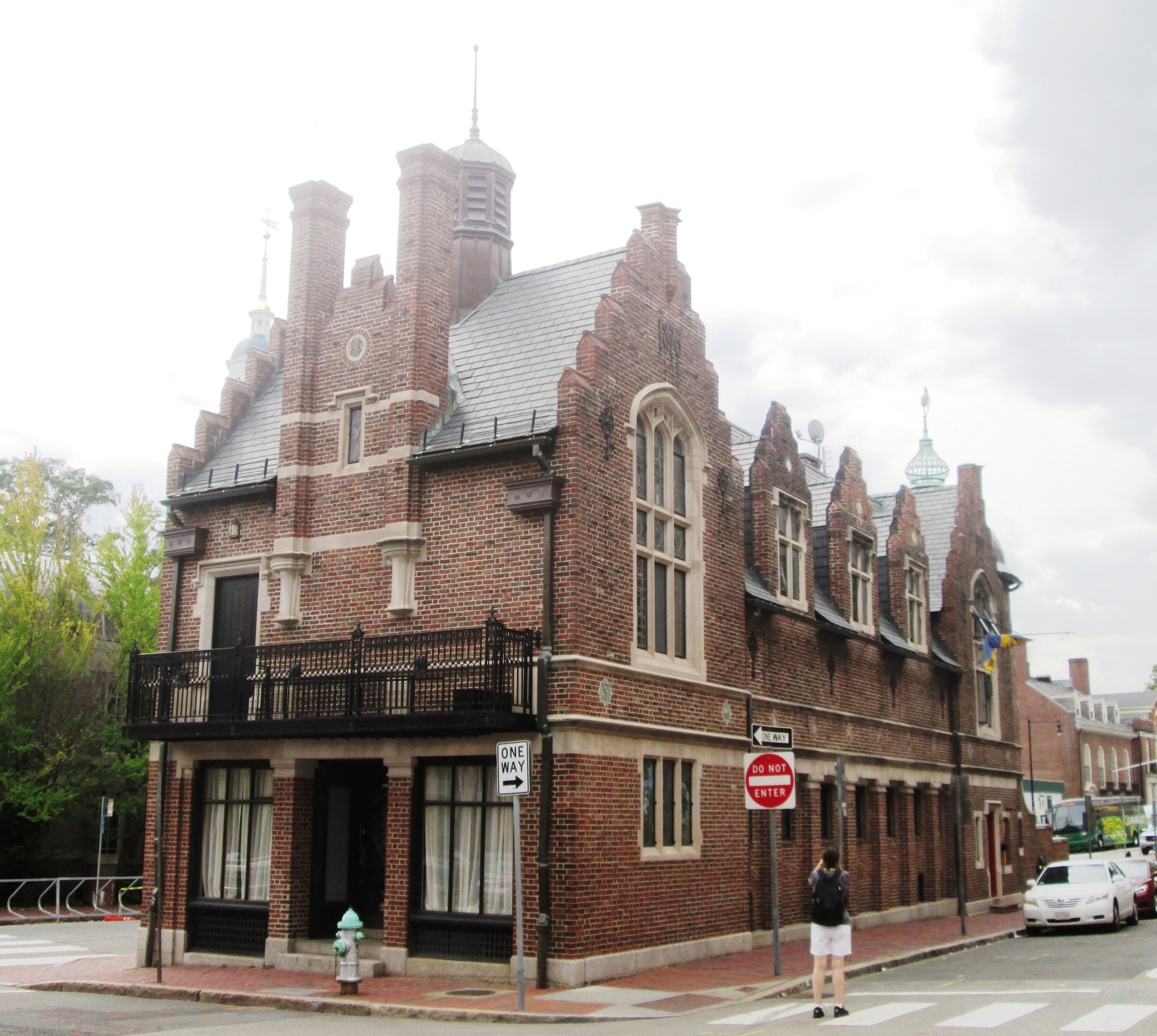
View from the rear (west)

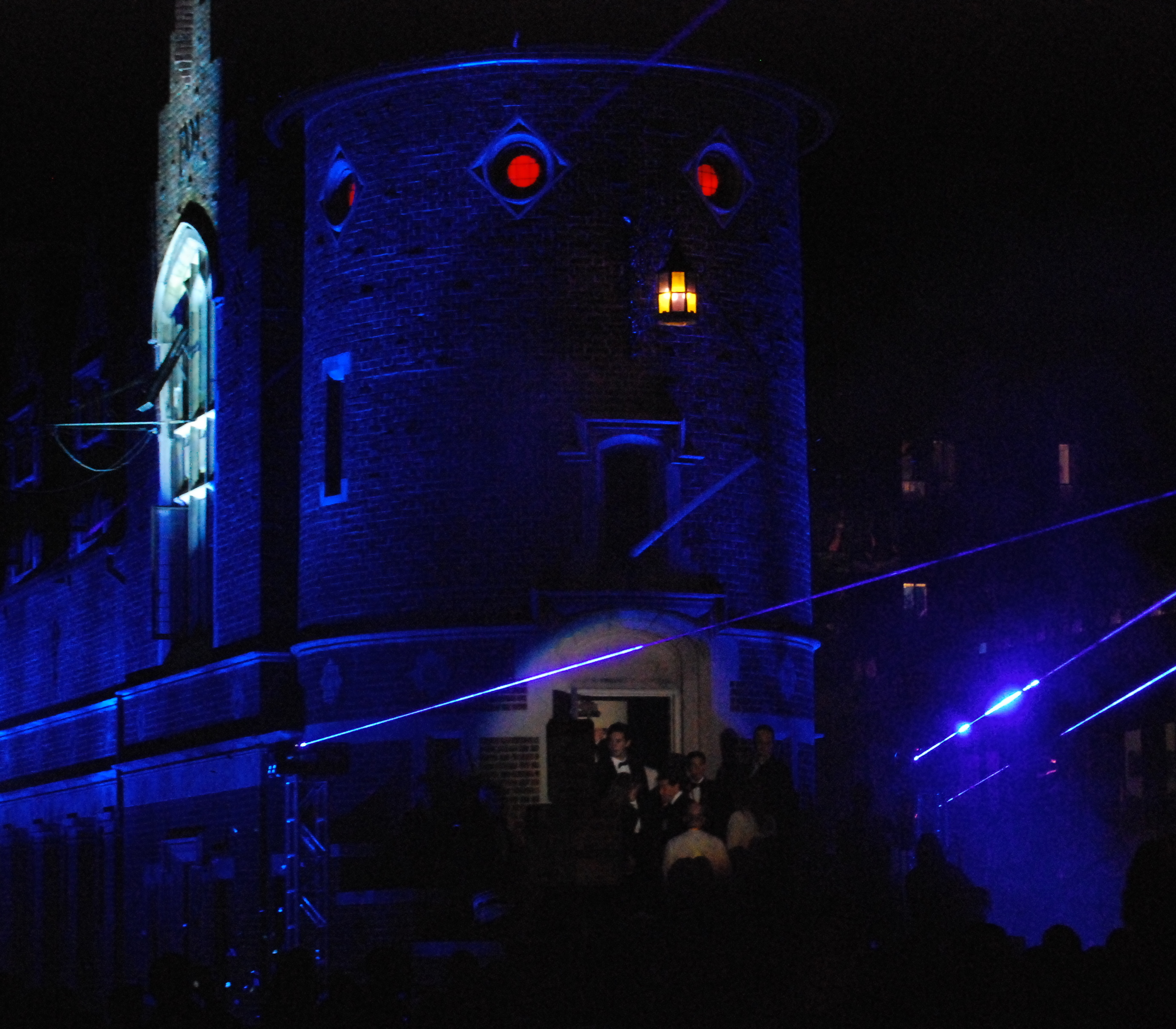
100th Anniversary celebration

== See also ==
- National Register of Historic Places listings in Cambridge, Massachusetts
