= John Brooks Wheelwright =

American poet

- Born: September 9, 1897; Milton, Massachusetts U.S.
- Died: September 13, 1940 (aged 43); Boston, Massachusetts, U.S.
- Occupation: Poet
- Writing career
- Period: 1923–1940
- Literary movement: Modernism, Socialist

John Brooks Wheelwright (sometimes Wheelright) (September 9, 1897 – September 13, 1940) was an American poet from a Boston Brahmin background. He belonged to the poetic avant garde of the 1930s and was a Marxist, a founder-member of the Trotskyist Socialist Workers Party in the United States. He was bisexual. He died after being struck by an automobile at the intersection of Beacon St. and Massachusetts Avenue in the early morning hours of September 13, 1940. His Selected Poems was published posthumously a few months later, with an introduction by his friend R.P. Blackmur.

Wheelwright was the son of Boston architect Edmund M. Wheelwright. He was descended from the 17th-century clergyman John Wheelwright on his father's side and the 18th-century Massachusetts governor John Brooks on his mother's side. He studied at Harvard University but left without a degree in 1920. He then studied at Massachusetts Institute of Technology before practising as an architect in Boston. From 1930 to 1932, Wheelwright worked with Lincoln Kirstein and Walker Evans to photograph Victorian architecture in Boston. He was editor of the magazine Poetry for a Dime.

== Works ==
- (ed.) A History of the New England Poetry Club, 1932.
- Rock and Shell: Poems 1923-1933, 1933.
- Mirrors of Venus: A Novel in Sonnets, 1914-1938, 1938.
- Political Self-Portrait, 1940
- Selected Poems, 1941.
- Collected Poems, ed. Alvin H. Rosenfeld, 1972.
