= Edmund M. Wheelwright =

American architect (1854–1912)

Edmund March Wheelwright FAIA
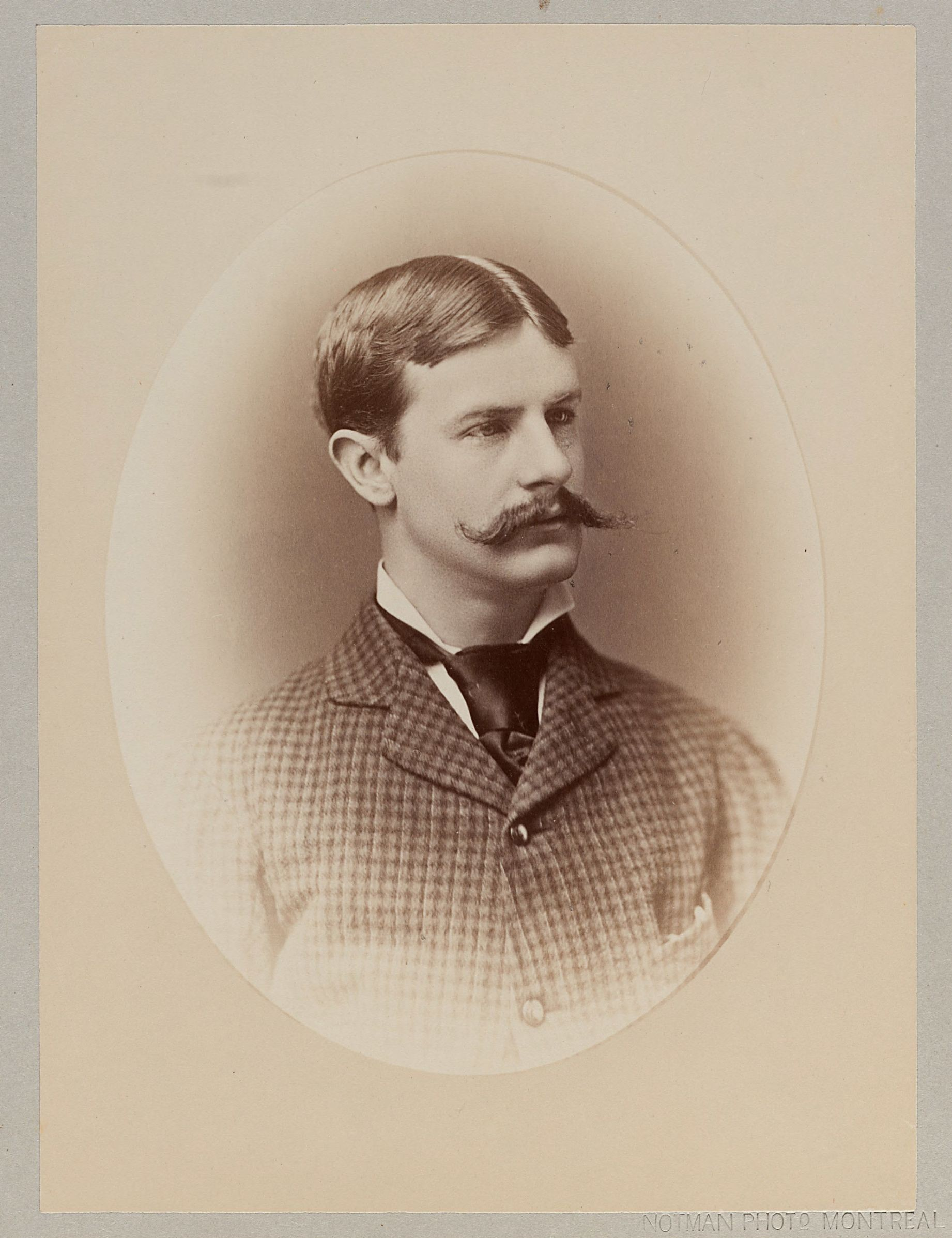
- Edmund M. Wheelwright, c. 1876
- Born: September 14, 1854; Roxbury, Massachusetts
- Died: August 15, 1912 (aged 57); Thompsonville, Connecticut
- Occupation: Architect
- Children: John Brooks Wheelwright
- Practice: Wheelwright & Haven; Wheelwright, Haven and Hoyt
- Buildings: Boston Opera House; Harvard Lampoon Building; Horticultural Hall; Larz Anderson Auto Museum; Massachusetts Historical Society Building; Jordan Hall; Oak Square School
- Projects: Longfellow Bridge; Anderson Memorial Bridge

6th City Architect of Boston
- In office 1891–1895
- Preceded by: Harrison H. Atwood
- Succeeded by: Office abolished

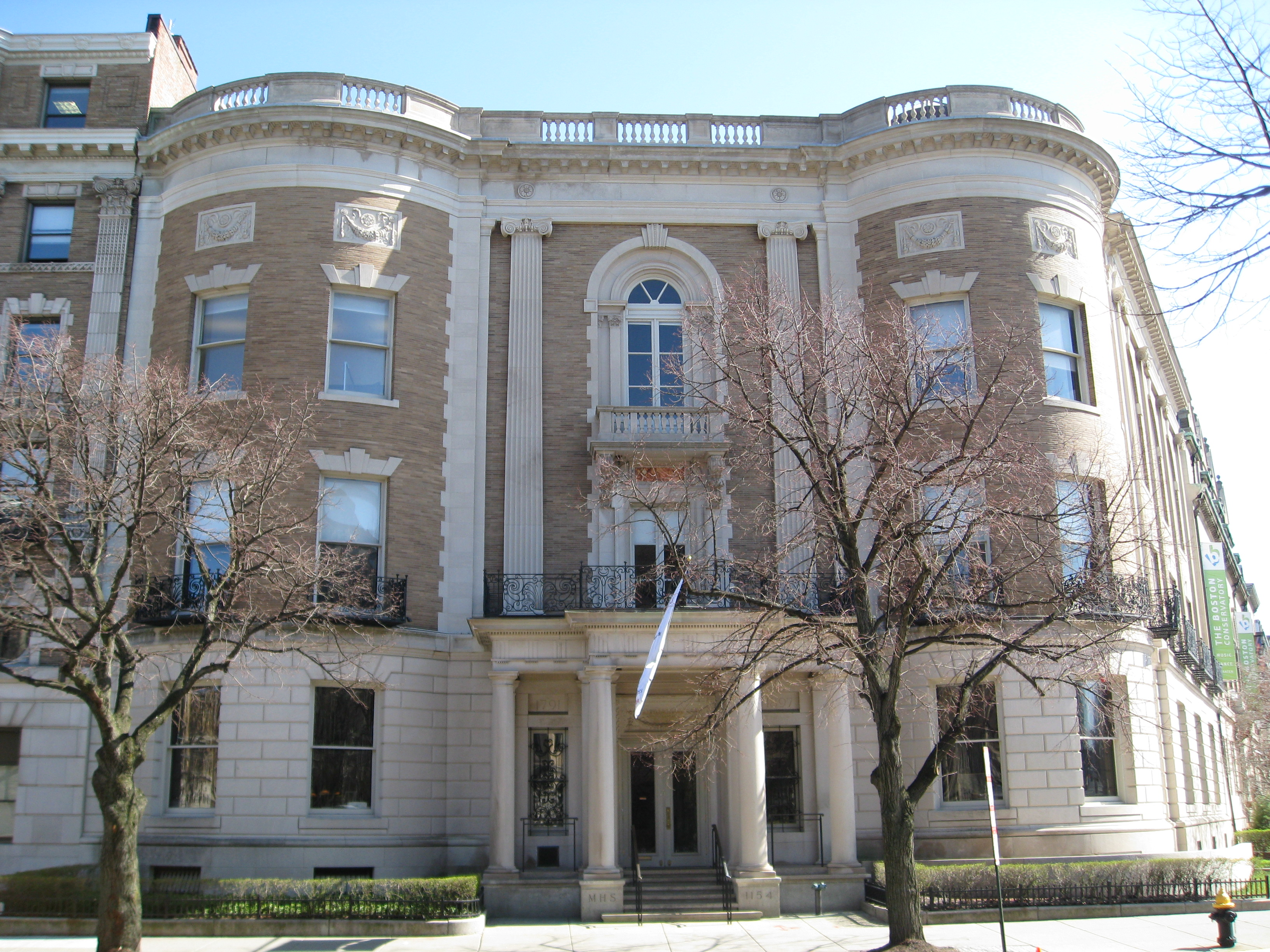
The building of the Massachusetts Historical Society, designed by Wheelwright & Haven and completed in 1899.

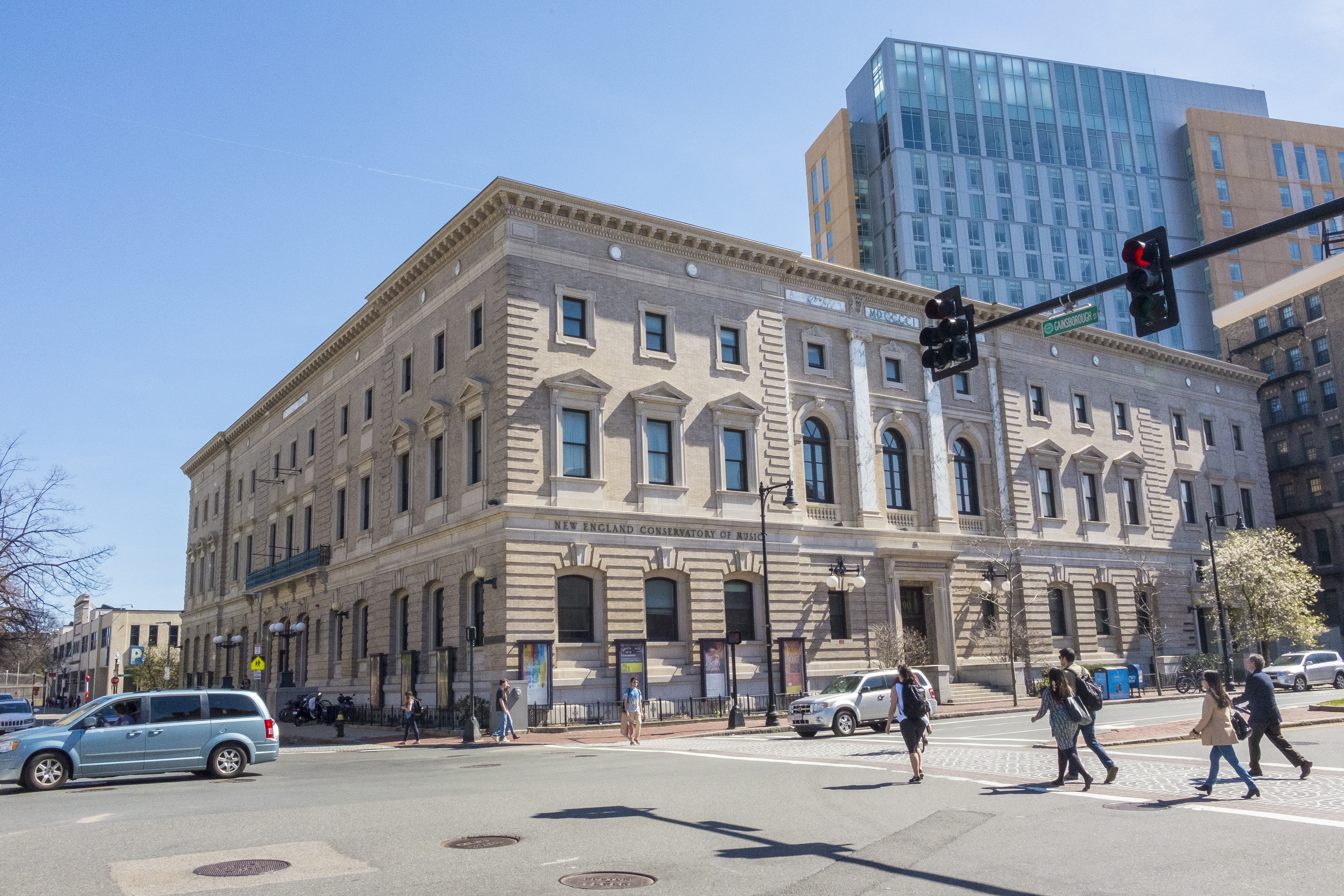
Jordan Hall of the New England Conservatory of Music, designed by Wheelwright & Haven and completed in 1903.

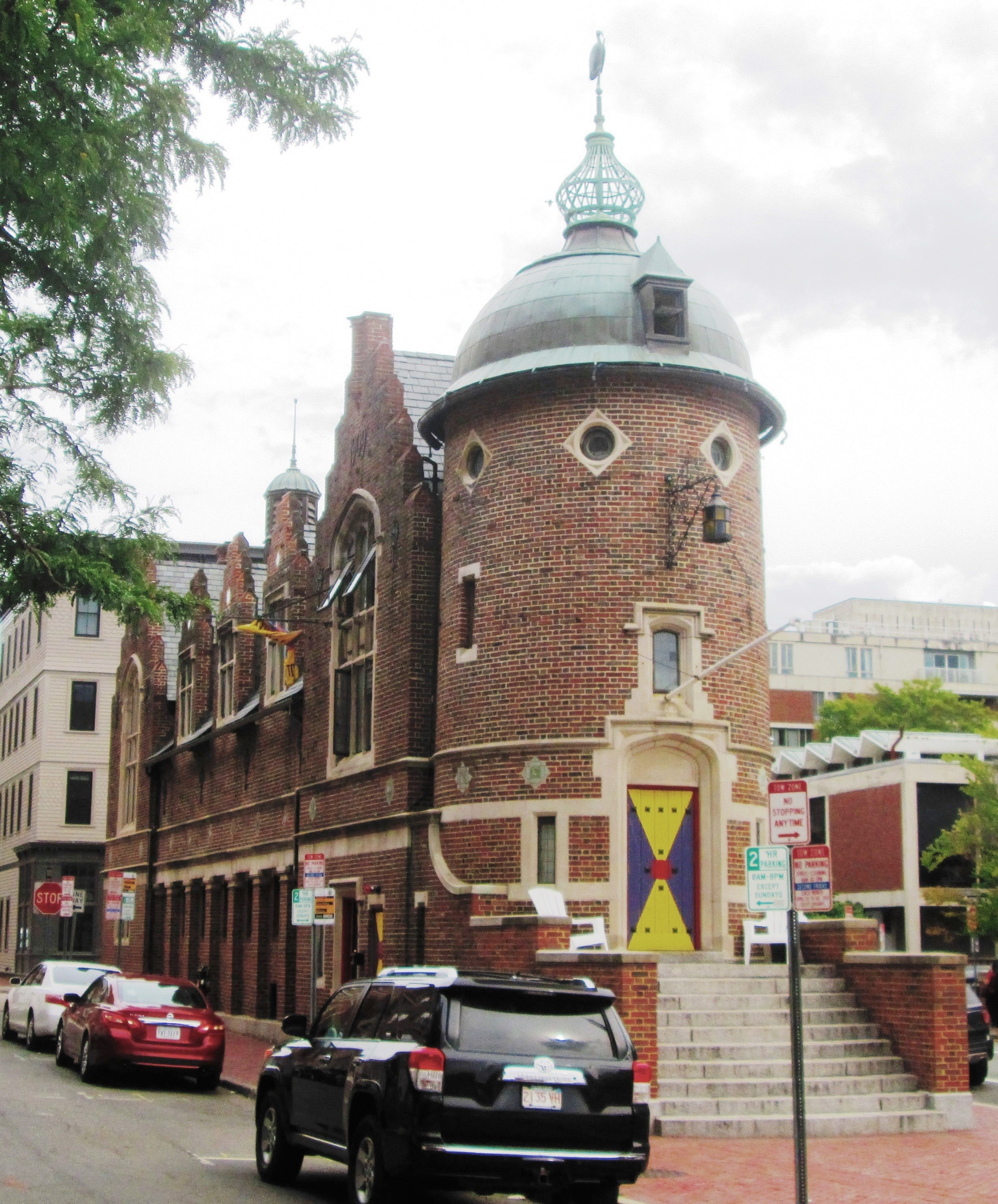
The Harvard Lampoon Building, designed by Wheelwright & Haven and completed in 1909.

Edmund March Wheelwright (September 14, 1854 – August 15, 1912) was one of New England's most important architects in the late nineteenth and early twentieth centuries, and served as city architect for Boston, Massachusetts from 1891 to 1895.

== Early life and career ==
Wheelwright was born in Roxbury, Massachusetts, educated at Roxbury Latin School and graduated from Harvard University in 1876. He studied architecture at the Massachusetts Institute of Technology and later in Europe, after which he worked in the offices of Peabody and Stearns and of firms in New York and Albany.

In 1883, he started a business of his own and afterwards became a member of the firm of Wheelwright & Haven, later known as Wheelwright, Haven & Hoyt. The firm operated until c. 1930 as Haven & Hoyt.

In 1893, Wheelwright and R. Clipston Sturgis were chosen by the trustees of the Museum of Fine Arts, Boston to spend a year studying art museums throughout Europe; they later contributed to the ongoing design of the museum's building on Huntington Avenue.

Wheelwright, who designed the Harvard Lampoon Building, also oversaw the construction. It was first opened on February 19, 1909. Wheelwright while attending Harvard University was one of the founders of the Harvard Lampoon. Wheelwright's design was inspired in part by an old church in Jamestown, Virginia, and by the Flemish Renaissance details of Auburn Street buildings in its vicinity.

He was a fellow of the American Institute of Architects, serving on its board of directors from 1892 to 1894 and 1898 to 1900, as well as a fellow of the Boston Society of Architects. He published two books on school architecture: "The American Schoolhouse" and "School Architecture."

Charles Donagh Maginnis had been his apprentice.

== City Architect ==
Wheelwright was nominated for the office of City Architect on March 30, 1891, by mayor Nathan Matthews Jr., the same day he fired the incumbent, Harrison H. Atwood. Wheelwright was confirmed by the city council on April 6, and for the next four years had control of all of the city's architectural work. Nonetheless Wheelwright believed that the city should be free to choose architects on a project-by-project basis, and after the election of Edwin Upton Curtis to succeed Matthews, advised him to abolish the office. The office was abolished later that year as part of a revision of the city charter, and Wheelwright returned to full-time private practice.

Wheelwright's most visible work as city architect was the former central fire station. In 1892, Wheelwright designed and built a 156 foot tall tower in the South End of Boston, Massachusetts, which was originally designed as part of this building and was used as a fire lookout. Since Wheelwright wanted the building to stand out, it was modeled after the 14th century Torre del Mangia in Siena, Italy, and made of brick like the Italian original. It is the city's only Florentine-inspired building. Since 1980, the building has housed the Pine Street Inn, a shelter for homeless people.

== Personal life ==
In June 1887, Wheelwright married Elizabeth Boott Brooks. His son was the poet John Brooks Wheelwright.

After suffering a nervous breakdown from overwork, he lived at a Thompsonville, Connecticut sanitarium for two years before dying on August 14, 1912, at age 57.

== Architectural works ==
Wheelwright designed the following:

- Boston Opera House (1909)
- Harvard Lampoon Building
- Horticultural Hall
- Larz Anderson Auto Museum
- Longfellow Bridge
- Massachusetts Historical Society building
- New England Conservatory's Jordan Hall
- Anderson Memorial Bridge
- Oak Square School
- Margaret Fuller School, Jamaica Plain, Boston (1891–1892)
- Forest Hills station

In addition, he was a consulting architect for:

- Boston Museum of Fine Arts
- Bulkeley Bridge in Hartford, Connecticut
- Cleveland Museum of Art

== Legacy ==
The Haven and Hoyt Collection at the Boston Public Library holds a variety of materials related to Wheelwright, including renderings and photographs.

== Selected publications ==
- Wheelwright, Edmund March, School architecture; a general treatise for the use of architects and others, Boston : Rogers & Manson, 1901.
- Wheelwright, Edmund March, Lampy's early days, The Harvard Lampoon Society, 1909
