= Nose goes =

Method to select a person for a task

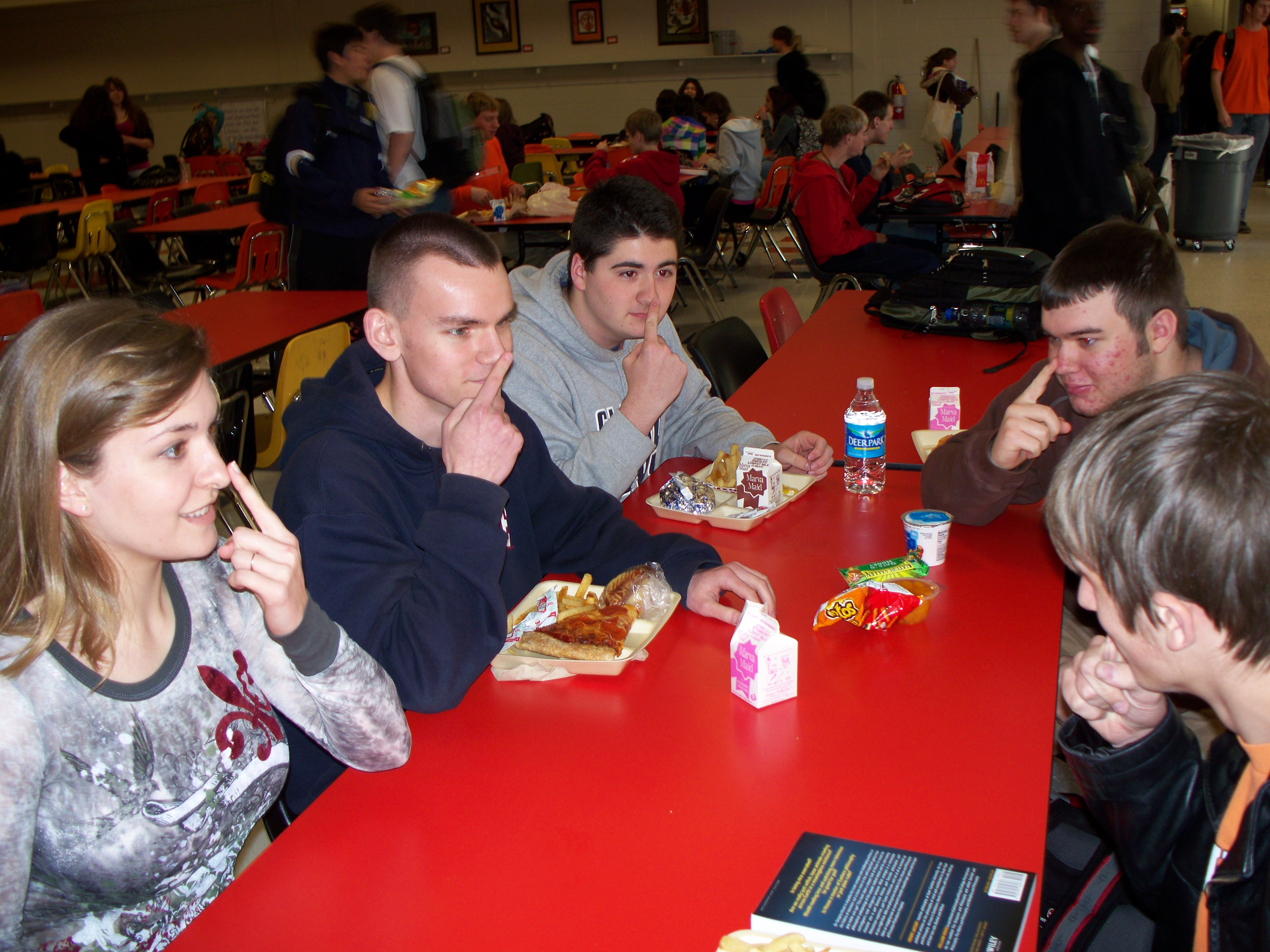
Students using "nose goes" to resolve a decision

Nose goes or the nose game, also uncommonly called the "rule of nose goes", is a selection method most commonly used when deciding which of several persons is assigned an unwanted task.

== Rules ==
The process may have different rules depending on the area, but the general rules are that as soon as one person puts their index finger on their nose to signal that "Nose Goes" is being used to resolve a decision, every other member of the group is prompted to touch their nose. The last person to put their finger on their nose gets assigned the task. If the rest of the group refuses to touch their noses, the person who initiated the Nose Goes process is assigned the task.

In some versions of the game, the starting player must shout "No nose goes", "Not it", or "Nose goes!" to begin the game; however, in other versions, no announcement is necessary and the last person to notice the game may end up having to perform the task.

== Variations ==
Nose goes does not have to be initiated by an individual of an unwanted task or bill. The last person to realize Nose goes has begun and places their finger on their nose is stuck with the task or bill.

A slightly different version of this game is frequently played in the Netherlands, mostly in student circles. The basics are the same, except instead of touching their nose, participants must make a dakje (Dutch; "roof") above their head by placing the tips of their fingers together and making an upside-down V ("Λ"). The game is usually started out by one person who acknowledges a task that needs to be done, and calls out zonder ("without") followed by the task. People who make the "roof" are exempt from having to do the task, and so the last person to make the roof is the one who has to do it.

A similar process in Australia and New Zealand involves participants saying "bags not!" and placing a thumb on their forehead.

The process is similar to the game "Get Down, Mr. President", where the last person in a group to touch their ear is tackled to the ground by the other players.

== See also ==
- I've got your nose
- Drawing lots (decision making)
