= Drawing lots (decision making) =

Method to determine tied elections

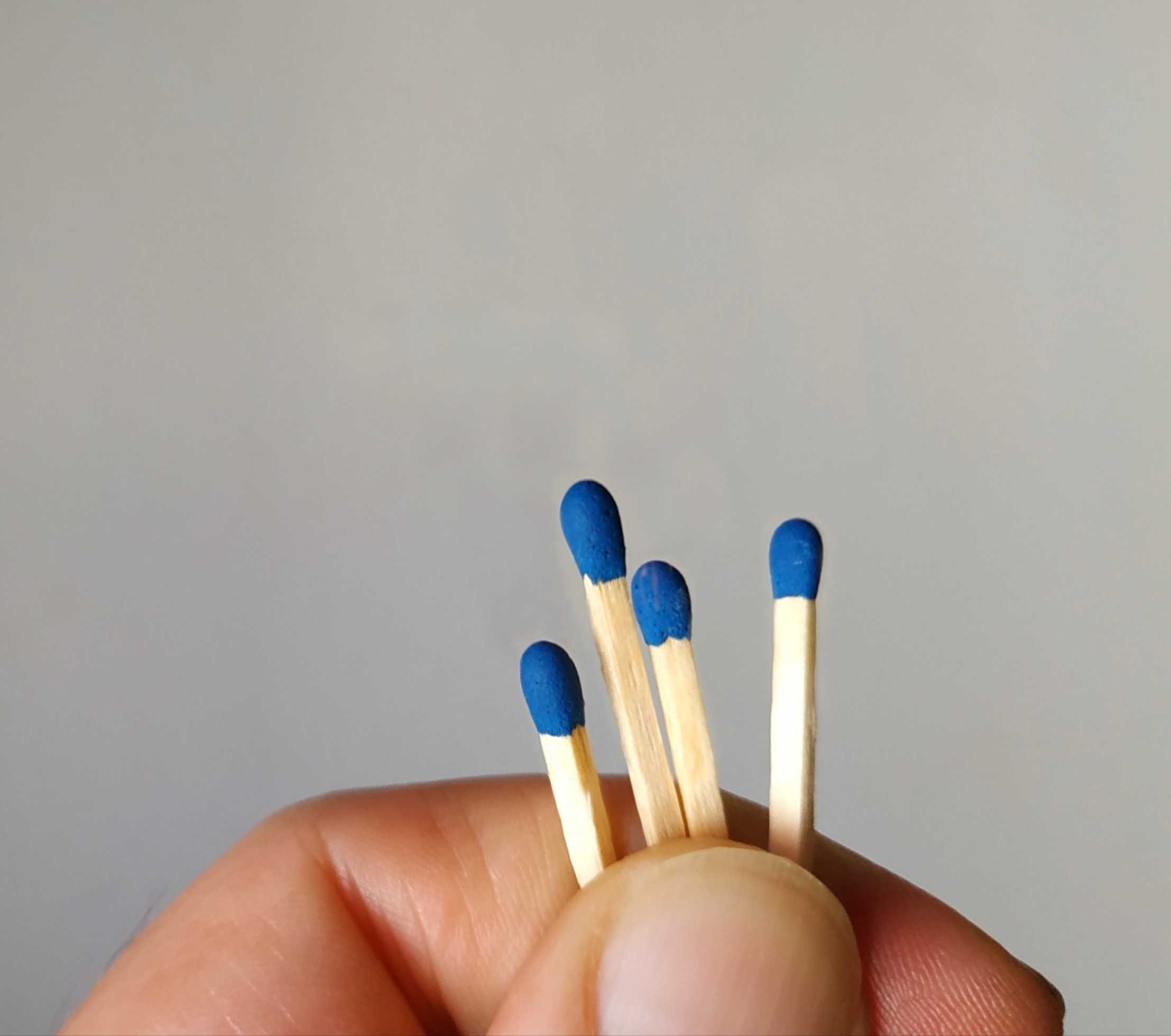
Four matches, one broken to be shorter than the others, presented to a group to draw from

Drawing lots or drawing straws is a selection method, or a form of sortition, that is used by a group to choose one member of the group to perform a task after none has volunteered for it. The same practice can be used also to choose one of several volunteers, should an agreement not be reached.

The drawing of lots is sometimes used to determine which candidate is elected where the candidates have the same number of votes. In the United Kingdom, drawing lots can be used to decide on the allocation of school places where other criteria result in a tie.

== Process ==
The group leader takes a number of straws (or similarly long cylindrical objects) and ensures that one of them is physically shorter than the others. The leader then grabs all of the straws in their fist, such that all of them appear to be of the same length.

The group leader offers the clenched fist to the group. Each member of the group draws a straw from the fist of the group leader. At the end of the offering, the group member who has drawn the shortest straw is the one who must perform the task.

Straws can also be cut diagonally so no two are the same length when multiple lots are to be chosen with a single draw to determine something like playing order, which participants will be teamed up, etc. No two straws the same length prevents ties and redraws among remaining participants where the short straw must be reused and a long straw that is in fact only one of several identical straws discarded. A short straw that is reused can end up marked either accidentally or intentionally and be readily identified and intentionally avoided or selected by a clever participant in subsequent draws. Drawing straws as an alternative to a coin toss and "odd man out" is only fair when it creates a level playing field and multiple random chance processes for fair results are reduced to a single random event.

== Politics ==
=== Canada ===
In the 2021 Yukon territorial election, one seat was determined by drawing of lots due to a tie.

=== United Kingdom ===
In the United Kingdom, if a local or national election has resulted in a tie in which candidates receive exactly the same number of votes after three recounts, the winner must be decided by random selection.

On 5 May 2017, Local election candidates in Northumberland drew straws to decide the winner in South Blythe Ward. Liberal Democrat candidate Lesley Rickerby was declared the winner, denying Conservatives overall control of Northumberland County Council.

=== United States ===
On 20 November 2015, a Mississippi state election was settled by drawing straws after both candidates received 4,589 votes. This resulted in Blaine Eaton being re-elected to the Mississippi House of Representatives.

== See also ==
- Cannibalism at sea, which often involved shipwrecked sailors drawing of lots to decide who would be killed and eaten to prevent starvation
- Cleromancy, a form of divination
- Drawing lots (cards), the practice, in card games, of cutting or drawing a random card to determine seating, partners, or first dealer
- Kau chim – Chinese fortune telling practice
- Nose goes, a game used to decide who gets assigned an unwanted task
- Sortition, the practice of randomly selecting political officials from a larger pool of candidates
