= The Harvard Lampoon =

College humor magazine

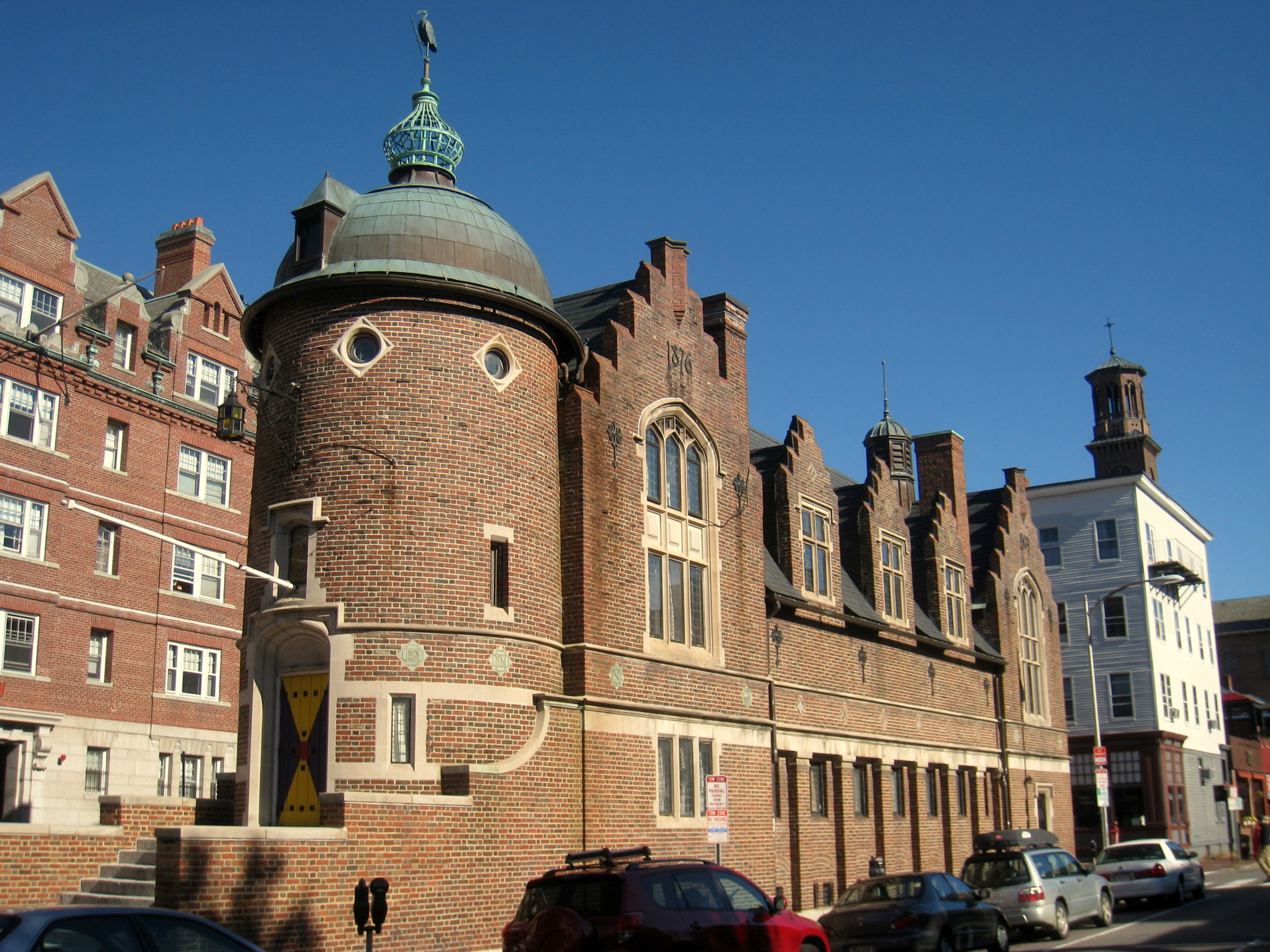
- The Lampoon Castle, designed by Edmund M. Wheelwright
- Categories: Humor magazine
- Circulation: 300,000
- Founded: February 1876; 150 years ago
- Based in: Harvard University; Cambridge, Massachusetts, US
- Website: harvardlampoon.com

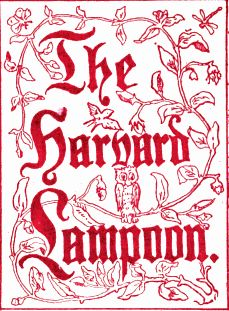
Title Dingbat from an 1886 Lampoon

The Harvard Lampoon is an undergraduate humor publication founded in 1876 by seven undergraduates at Harvard University in Cambridge, Massachusetts.

== Overview ==
The Harvard Lampoon publication was founded in 1876 by seven undergraduates at Harvard University in Cambridge, Massachusetts, who were inspired by popular magazines like Punch (1841) and Puck (1876). The Harvard Lampoon is the world's third longest-running continually published humor magazine, after the Swedish Blandaren (1863) and the Swiss Nebelspalter (1875).

The organization also produces occasional humor books (the best known being the 1969 J. R. R. Tolkien parody Bored of the Rings) and parodies of national magazines such as Entertainment Weekly and Sports Illustrated. Much of the organization's capital is provided by the licensing of the "Lampoon" name to National Lampoon, begun by Harvard Lampoon graduates in 1970.

The Lampoon publishes five issues annually. In 2006, the Lampoon began regularly releasing content on its website, including pieces from the magazine and web-only content. In 2009, the Lampoon published a parody of Twilight called Nightlight, which is a New York Times bestseller. In February 2012, the Lampoon released a parody of The Hunger Games called The Hunger Pains, also a New York Times bestseller.

The Lampoon is housed a few blocks from Harvard Square in a mock-Flemish castle, the Harvard Lampoon Building. It has been ranked by the magazine Complex as the fifth most phallic building in the world.

== History ==
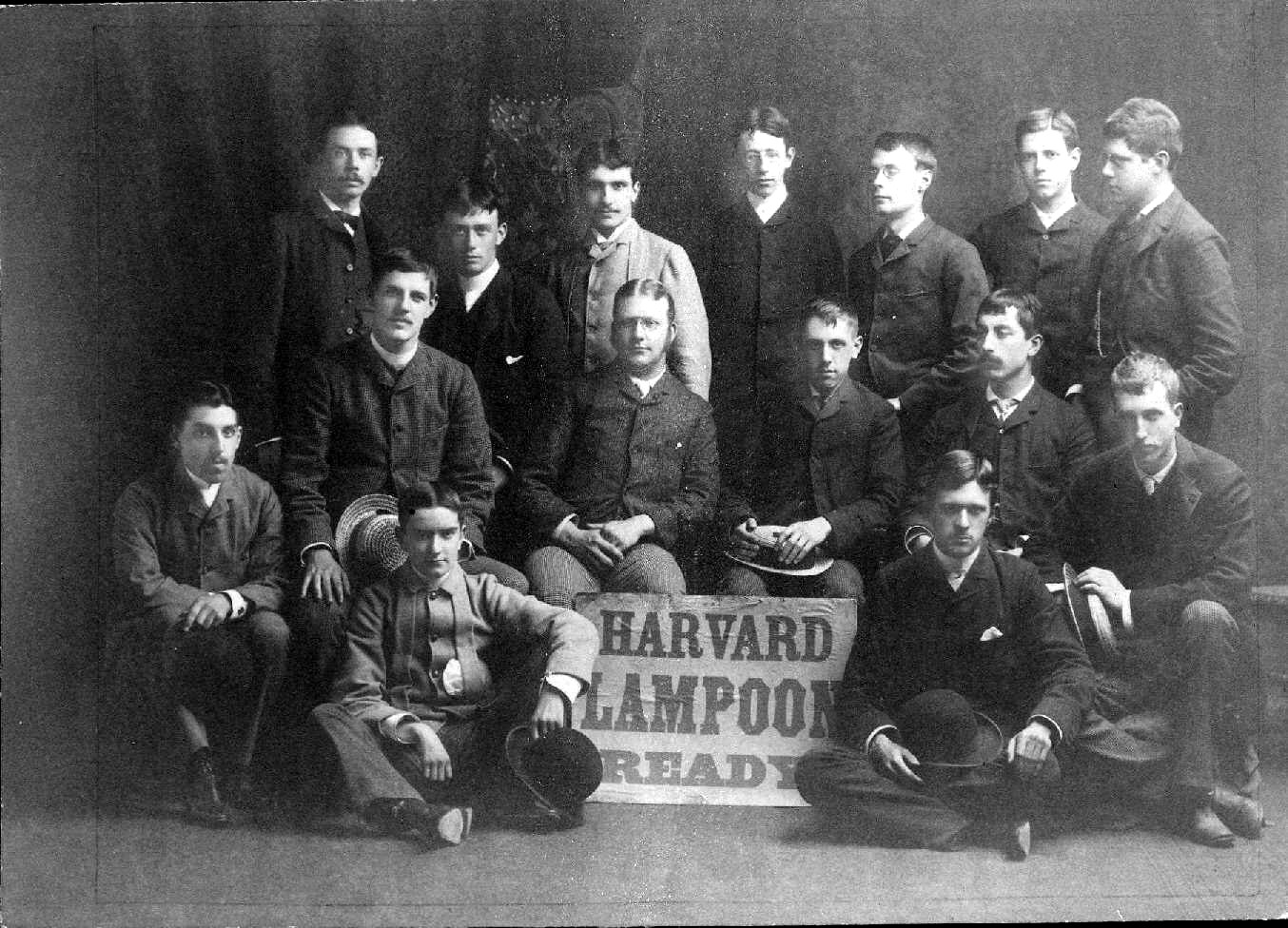
The 1885 Lampoon staff includes several notables, such as philosopher G. Santayana and newspaperman W.R. Hearst.

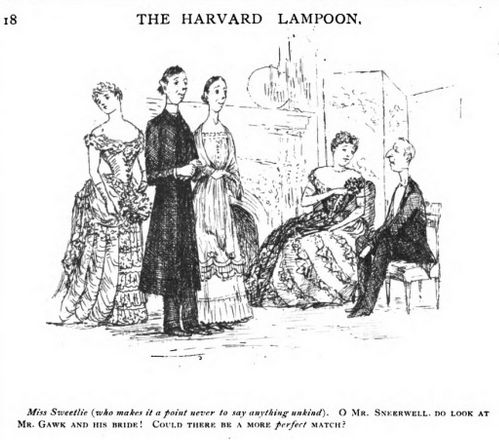
Cartoon by philosopher G. Santayana, Harvard class of 1886

The Harvard Lampoon was first published in 1876 by seven founders including Ralph Wormeley Curtis, Edward Sandford Martin, Edmund March Wheelwright, and Arthur Murray Sherwood (father of Robert E. Sherwood). The first issue of the Lampoon was a single copy, nailed to a tree in Harvard Yard. In its earliest years the magazine focused primarily on the satirization of Harvard and Boston Brahmin society. As the Lampoon began to gain notoriety on campus, the society moved from offices in Hollis Hall to addresses on Holyoke and Plympton streets respectively. These collections of rooms rented by the trustees of the Lampoon were famous not only for their beer nights, but also with the regularity that the Lampoon spent the profits made on each magazine for these beer nights. "It was a good night when the Lampoon could afford coal and beer, and they often had to choose between one or the other." Pranks abounded in the early years, some more destructive than others. William Randolph Hearst was expelled from Harvard after sending a pudding pot used as a chamber pot to a professor.

A Lampoon graduate from 1887, Archibald Cary Coolidge, professor of architecture at Harvard College, was chosen as the architect of Randolph Hall, one of the college's newest dormitories. Legend has it that when designing Randolph, Coolidge purposefully made the dormitory recessed further back from Mt. Auburn Street than was at first designed, purchasing for himself the land the Castle now stands on. The commission to design the castle was given to Edmund M. Wheelwright, then city architect of Boston.

The Lampoon and its sensibility began to branch out away from the Harvard campus in the early 1960s, and soon became an important expression of, and feeder system for, American humor and comedy. In 1961, Mademoiselle offered the Lampoon staff an honorarium to produce a parody of their own magazine for the traditionally lower-selling July issue. The project boosted Mademoiselle's summer circulation along with the Lampoon's ever tenuous cash flow, and the magazine renewed its association with the Lampoon for a follow-up parody in July 1962, and a third parody issue (of Esquire) in July 1963. The magazine also produced a 70-page spoof of Ian Fleming's James Bond novels in 1962 titled Alligator, which was subsequently released by Random House. These projects proved popular, and led to full, nationally-distributed parodies of Playboy (1966), Time (1968), and Life (1969), and later, Cosmopolitan in 1972, Sports Illustrated (1974), and People (1981).

An important line of demarcation came when Lampoon editors and National Lampoon co-founders Douglas Kenney and Henry Beard wrote the Tolkien parody Bored of the Rings. The success of this book and the attention it brought its authors led directly to the creation of the National Lampoon magazine. This in turn spun off a live show Lemmings, and then a radio show in the early 1970s, The National Lampoon Radio Hour, which featured such performers as Christopher Guest, Harry Shearer and Chevy Chase.

Writers from these shows were subsequently hired to help create Saturday Night Live. This was the first in a line of many TV shows that Lampoon graduates went on to write for, including The Simpsons, Futurama, Late Night with David Letterman, Seinfeld, Friends, The League, NewsRadio, The Office, 30 Rock, Parks and Recreation and dozens of others. An old copy of the magazine was shown in the fourth-season finale of NewsRadio, and referred to as the "nefarious scandal sheet."

Lampoon alumni include such comedians as Conan O'Brien, Andy Borowitz, B. J. Novak, Greg Daniels, Michael Schur, Christopher Cerf (Sesame Street), and Colin Jost. Etan Cohen wrote for Beavis and Butt-Head as an undergraduate member. In 1986 former editor Kurt Andersen co-founded the satirical magazine Spy, which employed Lampoon writers Paul Simms and Eric Kaplan, and published the work of Lampoon alumni Patricia Marx, Lawrence O'Donnell, and Mark O'Donnell. The Lampoon has also graduated many noted authors such as Robert Benchley, John Berendt, Walter Isaacson, George Plimpton, John Reed, George Santayana, John Updike, and William Gaddis. Actor Fred Gwynne was a cartoonist and president of the Lampoon. Famous Boston lawyer Bradley Palmer acted as treasurer for the Lampoon.

Celebrities often visit the Lampoon to be inducted as honorary members of the organization. Honorary members include Aerosmith, Winston Churchill, John Cleese, Bill Cosby, Billy Crystal, Tony Hawk, Paris Hilton, Hugh Hefner, Kesha, Jay Leno, Elon Musk, Ezra Pound, Adam Sandler, the cast of Saturday Night Live, Sarah Silverman, Tracey Ullman, Kurt Vonnegut, John Wayne, The Strokes, The Dare, Sacha Baron Cohen, and Robin Williams.

The Lampoon is also known for its bacchanalian parties and member initiation rituals.

== Rivalry with The Harvard Crimson ==
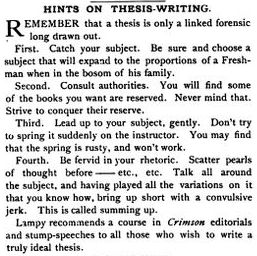
1886 example of Crimson-teasing by Lampoon editor T.P. Sanborn

The Lampoon has a long-standing rivalry with Harvard's student newspaper, The Harvard Crimson, which repeatedly refers to the Lampoon in its pages as "a semi-secret Sorrento Square social organization that used to occasionally publish a so-called humor magazine". The two organizations occupy buildings within less than one block of each other. Interaction between their staff has included pranks, vandalism, and romance.

The Lampoon–Crimson rivalry was furthered by the Crimson's 1953 theft of the Lampoon Castle's ibis statue and presentation of it as a gift to the government of the Soviet Union.

On 27 September 2011, the Lampoon stole the Harvard Crimson President's Chair, and had it used as a prop on Late Night with Jimmy Fallon.

On 2 June 2015, the Lampoon again stole the Harvard Crimson President's Chair; this time, pretending that it was the Harvard Crimson's editorial staff, they took the chair to Trump Tower to fake an endorsement for later-president Donald Trump.

On 5 October 2024, the Lampoon impersonated the Crimson, distributing Trump for Truth T-shirts, and interviewing with Right Side Broadcasting, New York Post and Associated Press, faking a Crimson endorsement of Trump, at a Trump campaign rally in Butler, PA, at the same site where a gunman tried to assassinate Trump in July.

== Publications ==
- Alligator (1962)
- Bored of the Rings (1969)
- The Hunger Pains (2012)

== Gallery ==
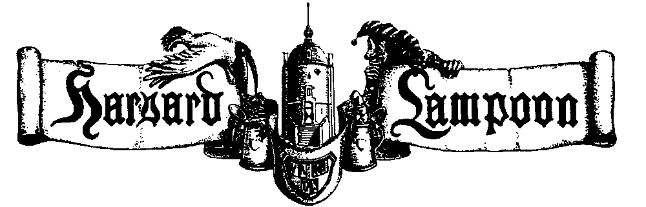
Masthead of the Harvard Lampoon

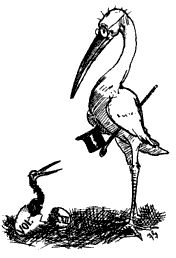
Lampoon's Ibis Mascot c. 1888

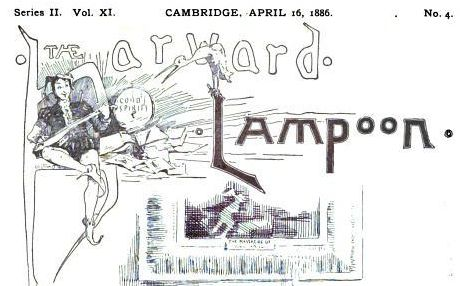
Lampy posing in an image from an 1886 Lampoon

== See also ==
- Blandaren
