= 2015 NIRSA National Soccer Championship =

- League: NIRSA
- Sport: Soccer
- Site: Reach 11 Sports Complex; Phoenix, Arizona
- Duration: November 19–21, 2015
- Teams: 24
- Results: Official Results

Men's Championship Division
- Score: 2–0
- Champion: North Carolina (1st title, 1st title game)
- Runners-up: Penn State (2nd title game)
- Season MVP: Pearce Veazy (North Carolina)

Women's Championship Division
- Score: 1–0 (a.e.t.)
- Champion: Michigan State (2nd title, 2nd title game)
- Runners-up: Colorado State (5th title game)
- Season MVP: Danielle Manning (Michigan State)

Men's Open Division
- Score: 3–2 (a.e.t.)
- Champion: Oregon (2nd title, 3rd title game)
- Runners-up: UC-Davis (1st title game)
- Season MVP: Andrew Saenz (Oregon)

Women's Open Division
- Score: 2–0
- Champion: UCLA (2nd title, 3rd title game)
- Runners-up: JMU (3rd title game)
- Top seed: Isis Piccillo (UCLA)

NIRSA national soccer championships seasons
- ← 2014 2016 →

The 2015 NIRSA national soccer championship was the 22nd NIRSA National Soccer Championships, the annual national championships for United States-based, collegiate club soccer teams organized by NIRSA. It took place at the Reach 11 Sports Complex in Phoenix, Arizona from Thursday, November 19 to Saturday, November 21, 2015.

== Overview ==
=== Men's championship ===
In the finals, the 2000 champions, Penn State, would face three-time semifinalist North Carolina in their national finals debut. Prior to this, in the group stage, Penn State would top their group after tying UCLA 0–0 in their opener and defeating reigning quarterfinalists Cincinnati 3–2 in the group stage finale. Meanwhile, North Carolina would tie Cal Poly 2–2 in the opener and a 2–0 win in their second game over Iowa State would not be enough to top their group as they would finish second on goal difference.

In the knockout round, Penn State would defeat both Cornell and 2004 champions, Texas A&M, 1–0 in the round of 16 and quarterfinals, respectively, and would defeat 2011 champions, Weber State, 2–1 to advance to the finals. Meanwhile, North Carolina would defeat 2006 champions, Michigan, 4–1 in the round of 16 and then would defeat regional opponent, UCF, 3–2 in overtime following a golden goal own goal from UCF. They'd then face 2006 runners-up, Illinois, in the semifinals. The game would remain deadlocked after regulation and extra time meaning penalties would be required. In the shootout, North Carolina would gain the edge after 9 rounds with an 8–7 victory to advance to their first title game.

In the finals, North Carolina opened the scoring with a goal from Eric Rossitch in the 5th minute off of a header near the 6-yard box off of a free kick. A goal in the last minute by Daniel Goff while Penn State had all 11 men in North Carolina's half would see North Carolina win 2–0. This was North Carolina's first national title and the first national title by a Region II team, the only region who hadn't had a team claim a men's championship national title previously.

=== Women's championship ===
In the finals, the 2012 champions, Michigan State, would face 2004 co-champions, Colorado State who were looking on claiming their fourth national title. Prior to this, in the group stage, both teams would top their groups with 4 points with Michigan State defeating 2004 co-champions, Colorado, 1–0 and tying Kansas 1–1 and Colorado State would defeat 2008 runners-up, Arizona, 6–0 and tying 2001 champions, Penn State, 1–1.

In the knockout round, Michigan State would defeat 3 region II teams to advance to the finals. First, in the round of 16, they'd defeat reigning quarterfinalist, North Carolina 1–0, then would defeat 1994 runners-up, Florida, 2–0 in the quarterfinals and finally would defeat 2011 semifinalist, Virginia Tech 3–2 in extra time following a 2–2 regulation where they trailed twice. Meanwhile, Colorado State would defeat reigning quarterfinalist Illinois 2–0 in the round of 16. They would then require penalties in their next two matches. First against reigning runners-up, Miami (OH) in following a deadlocked 0–0 regulation and extra time in the quarterfinals then fellow 2004 co-champion, Michigan, in the semifinals following a 1–1 match

In the finals, the game would remain 0–0 after 80 minutes, meaning extra time would be required again for both these teams. Four minutes into extra time, eventual MVP Danielle Manning of Michigan State would break the deadlock with a golden goal that gave Michigan State their second women's national title. This also ensured that both of Michigan State's titles were won in extra time.

=== Men's open ===
In the finals, Oregon would return to the open finals after their title 10 years ago in 2005 to face UC-Davis who were making their debut. Coming in, Oregon won each of their previous 5 games by at least 2 goals while UC-Davis had only given up a single goal. UC-Davis would go up 2–1 in the match, but Oregon's Henry Fassinger would score a penalty kick late into the game to tie the game at 2–2, forcing the game into extra time. Eventual MVP, Andrew Saenz of Oregon, would score a sudden-victory goal to secure Oregon's 3–2 win and their second national title.

=== Women's open ===
In the finals, 2012 open champions, JMU, would face last year's open runners-up UCLA. Coming in, JMU would require a penalty shootout in the quarterfinals while UCLA required extra time in the semifinals. UCLA would redeem their finals loss the previous year and defeat JMU 2–0, claiming their second open title. Isis Piccillo of UCLA would be named MVP.

== Format ==
The competition consisted of 96 teams: 48 men's teams and 48 women's teams. Each of these divisions were further divided into two 24-team divisions: the championship and open. The championship division divided teams into eight groups of three while the open division divided teams into six groups of four, both engaging in a round-robin tournament that determined teams able to advance to a knockout stage. Pool play games were two 40-minute halves, separated by a seven-minute halftime and utilized the three points for a win system. In the championship division, the two highest ranked teams from each group advanced to their knockout stage, with the third placed team advancing to a consolation bracket. In the open division, the top team from each group as well as the two best second placed teams advanced to their knockout stage.

Tie-breaking criteria for group play
The ranking of teams in each group was based on the following criteria in order:
1. Highest number of points
2. Winner of head-to-head competition
3. Greatest goal difference
  - Maximum ± 5 goal difference per match
4. Most goals scored
5. Most shutouts

In a tie breaking scenario involving more than 2 teams, the tiebreaker procedure would begin. If one team is identified as different and both remaining teams are still tied, the tie breaker procedure is restarted.

If a tie still remained after the first 5 criteria, the following was used to break a tie:

1. NCAA kicks from the mark
  - If there was a three-way tie, a coin-flip would be conducted. The two teams that chose the same outcome would compete in kicks from the mark between each other. The winner would compete with the last remaining team in kicks from the mark
  - If there's a four-way tie, a drawing of lots would be conducted (only could occur in open division)

Knockout stage games also consisted of two 40-minute halves. The round of 16 and quarterfinals were separated by a seven-minute halftime while the semifinals and finals had a ten-minute halftime. Knockout stage games needed to declare a winner. If a knockout-stage game was tied at the end of regulation, overtime would begin. Overtime consisted of one, 15-minute, golden-goal period. If still tied after overtime, kicks from the mark would determine the winner.

== Qualification and selections ==
Each of the six regions received three automatic bids for both the men's and women's championship that they awarded to its members. The final six bids were considered "at-large", and were given out by NIRSA to teams, typically based on their regional tournament results and RPI.

The 48 remaining teams participated in the open division and were selected via a lottery draw that aired on YouTube on September 29, 2015, at 4pm EST. If a selected team qualified for the championship division, an alternate took their spot. 41 men's teams and 40 women's were selected.

=== Men's championship ===
Automatic bids
Region	Team	Appearance	Last Bid
I	Penn State	14th	2013
I	Delaware	10th	2014
I	Cornell	8th	2006
II	Virginia Tech	8th	2014
II	Florida State	2nd	2014
II	UCF	2nd	2010
III	Michigan	12th	2013
III	Cincinnati	4th	2014
III	Wisconsin	1st	Never
IV	Texas	17th	2014
IV	Texas A&M	16th	2014
IV	UTEP	4th	2014
V	Minnesota	12th	2012
V	Colorado Mines	5th	2014
V	Iowa State	2nd	2014
VI	Weber State	14th	2013
VI	Cal Poly	7th	2014
VI	UC-Berkeley	5th	2011

At-large bids
Region	Team	Appearance	Last Bid
II	North Carolina	11th	2011
III	Illinois	13th	2014
III	Loyola-Chicago	1st	Never
IV	Missouri	8th	2013
V	Colorado State	18th	2014
VI	UCLA	5th	2012

=== Women's championship ===
Automatic bid
Region	Team	Appearance	Last Bid
I	Penn State	20th	2014
I	Delaware	13th	2014
I	Pitt	6th	2014
II	Florida	13th	2014
II	Virginia Tech	14th	2013
II	North Carolina	12th	2014
III	Ohio State	15th	2014
III	Michigan	16th	2013
III	Illinois	11th	2014
IV	Texas	16th	2014
IV	Texas A&M	16th	2014
IV	Kansas	6th	2014
V	Colorado	21st	2014
V	Colorado State	19th	2014
V	Colorado Mines	4th	2014
VI	UC-Santa Barbara	15th	2014
VI	Arizona	8th	2011
VI	Cal Poly	5th	2013

At-large bids
Region	Team	Appearance	Last Bid
I	Cornell	9th	2014
III	Miami (OH)	15th	2014
III	Michigan State	12th	2014
IV	Wash U	2nd	2011
VI	Cal State – Long Beach	1st	Never
VI	Northern Arizona	1st	Never

=== Men's lottery selection ===
Full men's lottery selections
Region	Team	Selection Type	Bid result
I	Villanova	Automatic	Accepted
I	UConn	Automatic	Accepted
I	SUNY Brockport	Automatic	Accepted
I	Boston College	Automatic	Accepted
I	Stony Brook	Waitlist	Accepted from waitlist
I	Towson	Waitlist	Not given
I	West Point	Waitlist	Not given
I	Penn State	Waitlist	Championship
I	George Mason	Waitlist	Not given
II	Mary Washington	Automatic	Not accepted
II	UCF	Automatic	Championship
II	JMU	Automatic	Accepted
II	Georgia College	Automatic	Accepted
II	Kennesaw State	Waitlist	Accepted from waitlist
II	Old Dominion	Waitlist	Not accepted
III	Purdue	Automatic	Accepted
III	Illinois	Automatic	Accepted
III	UW-Milwaukee	Automatic	Accepted
III	Cincinnati	Automatic	Not accepted
IV	Baylor	Automatic	Not accepted
IV	Arkansas	Automatic	Accepted
IV	Texas Tech	Automatic	Accepted
IV	Missouri	Automatic	Championship
IV	St. Edwards	Waitlist	Accepted from waitlist
IV	Kansas State	Waitlist	Accepted from waitlist
IV	Texas	Waitlist	Accepted from waitlist
IV	LSU	Waitlist	Not given
V	Colorado Mines	Automatic	Accepted
V	Colorado	Automatic	Accepted
V	Colorado State-Pueblo	Automatic	Accepted
V	Denver	Automatic	Accepted
VI	Oregon	Automatic	Accepted
VI	Cal State-Fullerton	Automatic	Accepted
VI	Utah Valley	Automatic	Accepted
VI	Washington State	Automatic	Not accepted
VI	Oregon State	Waitlist	Not accepted
VI	UC-Davis	Waitlist	Accepted from waitlist
VI	UC Berkeley	Waitlist	Championship
VI	Northern Arizona	Waitlist	Not given
VI	UCLA	Waitlist	Championship
VI	UC-San Diego	Waitlist	Not given

Participating teams
Region	Team	Selection Type	Bid result
I	Villanova	Automatic	Accepted
I	UConn	Automatic	Accepted
I	SUNY Brockport	Automatic	Accepted
I	Boston College	Automatic	Accepted
I	Stony Brook	Waitlist	Accepted from waitlist
II	JMU	Automatic	Accepted
II	Georgia College	Automatic	Accepted
II	Kennesaw State	Waitlist	Accepted from waitlist
III	Purdue	Automatic	Accepted
III	Illinois	Automatic	Accepted
III	UW-Milwaukee	Automatic	Accepted
IV	Arkansas	Automatic	Accepted
IV	Texas Tech	Automatic	Accepted
IV	St. Edwards	Waitlist	Accepted from waitlist
IV	Kansas State	Waitlist	Accepted from waitlist
IV	Texas	Waitlist	Accepted from waitlist
V	Colorado Mines	Automatic	Accepted
V	Colorado	Automatic	Accepted
V	Colorado State-Pueblo	Automatic	Accepted
V	Denver	Automatic	Accepted
VI	Oregon	Automatic	Accepted
VI	Cal State-Fullerton	Automatic	Accepted
VI	Utah Valley	Automatic	Accepted
VI	UC-Davis	Waitlist	Accepted from waitlist

=== Women's lottery selection ===
Full women's lottery selections
Region	Team	Selection Type	Bid result
I	Vermont	Automatic	Accepted
I	Northeastern	Automatic	Accepted
I	Penn	Automatic	Accepted
I	Pitt	Automatic	Championship
I	Fordham	Waitlist	Not accepted
I	UConn	Waitlist	Accepted from waitlist
I	Boston College	Waitlist	Accepted from waitlist
I	Villanova	Waitlist	Not given
I	Penn State	Waitlist	Championship
I	Rutgers	Waitlist	Not given
II	Virginia Tech	Automatic	Championship
II	Florida State	Automatic	Not accepted
II	Vanderbilt	Automatic	Accepted
II	Miami (FL)	Automatic	Accepted
II	UCF	Waitlist	Accepted from waitlist
II	JMU	Waitlist	Accepted from waitlist
II	East Carolina	Waitlist	Not given
III	Towson	Automatic	Not accepted
III	Illinois	Automatic	Championship
III	Iowa	Automatic	Accepted
III	UW-Milwaukee	Automatic	Accepted
IV	St. Edwards	Automatic	Accepted
IV	Texas Tech	Automatic	Accepted
IV	Wash U	Automatic	Championship
IV	TCU	Automatic	Accepted
IV	Rice	Waitlist	Accepted from waitlist
IV	Missouri	Waitlist	Not given
IV	Texas	Waitlist	Championship
IV	Kansas	Waitlist	Championship
V	Denver	Automatic	Accepted
V	Colorado Mines	Automatic	Championship
V	Colorado	Automatic	Accepted
V	Colorado Mesa	Automatic	Not accepted
VI	UC Berkeley	Automatic	Accepted
VI	UCLA	Automatic	Accepted
VI	San Diego State	Automatic	Accepted
VI	UC Santa Barbara	Automatic	Championship
VI	USC	Waitlist	Accepted from waitlist
VI	Oregon	Waitlist	Accepted from waitlist
VI	Arizona State	Waitlist	Accepted from waitlist

Participating teams
Region	Team	Selection Type	Bid result
I	Vermont	Automatic	Accepted
I	Northeastern	Automatic	Accepted
I	Penn	Automatic	Accepted
I	UConn	Waitlist	Accepted from waitlist
I	Boston College	Waitlist	Accepted from waitlist
II	Vanderbilt	Automatic	Accepted
II	Miami (FL)	Automatic	Accepted
II	UCF	Waitlist	Accepted from waitlist
II	JMU	Waitlist	Accepted from waitlist
III	Iowa	Automatic	Accepted
III	UW-Milwaukee	Automatic	Accepted
IV	St. Edwards	Automatic	Accepted
IV	Texas Tech	Automatic	Accepted
IV	TCU	Automatic	Accepted
IV	Rice	Waitlist	Accepted from waitlist
V	Denver	Automatic	Accepted
V	Colorado	Automatic	Accepted
VI	UC-Berkeley	Automatic	Accepted
VI	UCLA	Automatic	Accepted
VI	San Diego State	Automatic	Accepted
VI	USC	Waitlist	Accepted from waitlist
VI	Oregon	Waitlist	Accepted from waitlist
VI	Arizona State	Waitlist	Accepted from waitlist

== Group stage ==
=== Men's championship ===
Group A
Pos	Team	Pld	W	D	L	GF	GA	GD	Pts	Qualification
1	Michigan	2	2	0	0	4	1	+3	6	Advanced to knockout stage
2	Florida State	2	1	0	1	3	2	+1	3	Advanced to knockout stage
3	UC-Berkeley	2	0	0	2	2	6	−4	0	Consolation

Scores

8:00am MST	Michigan	3–1	UC-Berkeley	Field 11
Thu, November 19		Report		Stadium: Reach 11 Sports Complex; Phoenix, Arizona

1:15pm MST	UC-Berkeley	1–3	Florida State	Field 13
Thu, November 19		Report		Stadium: Reach 11 Sports Complex; Phoenix, Arizona

6:30pm MST	Florida State	0–1	Michigan	Field 12
Thu, November 19		Report		Stadium: Reach 11 Sports Complex; Phoenix, Arizona

Group B
Pos	Team	Pld	W	D	L	GF	GA	GD	Pts	Qualification
1	Delaware	2	1	1	0	2	0	+2	4	Advanced to knockout stage
2	Colorado State	2	0	2	0	2	2	0	2	Advanced to knockout stage
3	Virginia Tech	2	0	1	1	2	4	−2	1	Consolation

Scores

8:00am MST	Virginia Tech	2–2	Colorado State	Field 12
Thu, November 19		Report		Stadium: Reach 11 Sports Complex; Phoenix, Arizona

1:15pm MST	Colorado State	0–0	Delaware	Field 14
Thu, November 19		Report		Stadium: Reach 11 Sports Complex; Phoenix, Arizona

6:30pm MST	Delaware	2–0	Virginia Tech	Field 11
Thu, November 19		Report		Stadium: Reach 11 Sports Complex; Phoenix, Arizona

Group C
Pos	Team	Pld	W	D	L	GF	GA	GD	Pts	Qualification
1	Texas A&M	2	2	0	0	8	3	+5	6	Advanced to knockout stage
2	Illiniois	2	1	0	1	3	3	0	3	Advanced to knockout stage
3	Minnesota	2	0	0	2	2	7	−5	0	Consolation

Scores

8:00am MST	Texas A&M	3–1	Illiniois	Field 13
Thu, November 19		Report		Stadium: Reach 11 Sports Complex; Phoenix, Arizona

1:15pm MST	Illiniois	2–0	Minnesota	Field 11
Thu, November 19		Report		Stadium: Reach 11 Sports Complex; Phoenix, Arizona

6:30pm MST	Minnesota	2–5	Texas A&M	Field 14
Thu, November 19		Report		Stadium: Reach 11 Sports Complex; Phoenix, Arizona

Group D
Pos	Team	Pld	W	D	L	GF	GA	GD	Pts	Qualification
1	Cal Poly	2	1	1	0	7	3	+4	4	Advanced to knockout stage
2	North Carolina	2	1	1	0	4	2	+2	4	Advanced to knockout stage
3	Iowa State	2	0	0	2	1	7	−6	0	Consolation

Scores

8:00am MST	Cal Poly	2–2	North Carolina	Field 14
Thu, November 19		Report		Stadium: Reach 11 Sports Complex; Phoenix, Arizona

1:15pm MST	North Carolina	2–0	Iowa State	Field 12
Thu, November 19		Report		Stadium: Reach 11 Sports Complex; Phoenix, Arizona

6:30pm MST	Iowa State	1–5	Cal Poly	Field 13
Thu, November 19		Report		Stadium: Reach 11 Sports Complex; Phoenix, Arizona

Group E
Pos	Team	Pld	W	D	L	GF	GA	GD	Pts	Qualification
1	Wisconsin	2	2	0	0	8	2	+6	6	Advanced to knockout stage
2	Missouri	2	1	0	1	4	5	−1	3	Advanced to knockout stage
3	Colorado Mines	2	0	0	2	2	7	−5	0	Consolation

Scores

9:45am MST	Colorado Mines	1–3	Missouri	Field 11
Thu, November 19		Report		Stadium: Reach 11 Sports Complex; Phoenix, Arizona

3:00pm MST	Missouri	1–4	Wisconsin	Field 13
Thu, November 19		Report		Stadium: Reach 11 Sports Complex; Phoenix, Arizona

8:15pm MST	Wisconsin	4–1	Colorado Mines	Field 12
Thu, November 19		Report		Stadium: Reach 11 Sports Complex; Phoenix, Arizona

Group F
Pos	Team	Pld	W	D	L	GF	GA	GD	Pts	Qualification
1	Penn State	2	1	1	0	3	2	+1	4	Advanced to knockout stage
2	UCLA	2	0	2	0	2	2	0	2	Advanced to knockout stage
3	Cincinnati	2	0	1	1	4	5	−1	1	Consolation

Scores

9:45am MST	Penn State	0–0	UCLA	Field 12
Thu, November 19		Report		Stadium: Reach 11 Sports Complex; Phoenix, Arizona

3:00pm MST	UCLA	2–2	Cincinnati	Field 14
Thu, November 19		Report		Stadium: Reach 11 Sports Complex; Phoenix, Arizona

8:15pm MST	Cincinnati	2–3	Penn State	Field 11
Thu, November 19		Report		Stadium: Reach 11 Sports Complex; Phoenix, Arizona

Group G
Pos	Team	Pld	W	D	L	GF	GA	GD	Pts	Qualification
1	UTEP	2	0	2	0	4	4	0	2	Advanced to knockout stage
2	Cornell	2	0	2	0	2	2	0	2	Advanced to knockout stage
3	Texas	2	0	2	0	2	2	0	2	Consolation

Scores

9:45am MST	Texas	2–2	UTEP	Field 13
Thu, November 19		Report		Stadium: Reach 11 Sports Complex; Phoenix, Arizona

3:00pm MST	UTEP	2–2	Cornell	Field 11
Thu, November 19		Report		Stadium: Reach 11 Sports Complex; Phoenix, Arizona

8:15pm MST	Cornell	0–0	Texas	Field 14
Thu, November 19		Report		Stadium: Reach 11 Sports Complex; Phoenix, Arizona

11:30am MST	Cornell	4–2; Kicks from the mark	Texas	Field 12
Fri, November 20		Report		Stadium: Reach 11 Sports Complex; Phoenix, Arizona

Group H
Pos	Team	Pld	W	D	L	GF	GA	GD	Pts	Qualification
1	UCF	2	2	0	0	7	0	+7	6	Advanced to knockout stage
2	Weber State	2	1	0	1	3	3	0	3	Advanced to knockout stage
3	Loyola – Chicago	2	0	0	2	0	7	−7	0	Consolation

Scores

9:45am MST	Weber State	3–0	Loyola – Chicago	Field 14
Thu, November 19		Report		Stadium: Reach 11 Sports Complex; Phoenix, Arizona

3:00pm MST	Loyola – Chicago	0–4	UCF	Field 12
Thu, November 19		Report		Stadium: Reach 11 Sports Complex; Phoenix, Arizona

8:15pm MST	UCF	3–0	Weber State	Field 13
Thu, November 19		Report		Stadium: Reach 11 Sports Complex; Phoenix, Arizona

=== Women's championship ===
Group A
Pos	Team	Pld	W	D	L	GF	GA	GD	Pts	Qualification
1	Ohio State	2	1	1	0	3	1	+2	4	Advanced to knockout stage
2	Virginia Tech	2	1	1	0	3	1	+2	4	Advanced to knockout stage
3	Colorado Mines	2	0	0	2	0	4	−4	0	Consolation

Scores

8:00am MST	Ohio State	2–0	Colorado Mines	Field 15
Thu, November 19		Report		Stadium: Reach 11 Sports Complex; Phoenix, Arizona

1:15pm MST	Colorado Mines	0–2	Virginia Tech	Field 17
Thu, November 19		Report		Stadium: Reach 11 Sports Complex; Phoenix, Arizona

6:30pm MST	Virginia Tech	1–1	Ohio State	Field 16
Thu, November 19		Report		Stadium: Reach 11 Sports Complex; Phoenix, Arizona

9:30am MST	Ohio State	4–3; Kicks from the mark	Virginia Tech	Field 15
Fri, November 20		Report		Stadium: Reach 11 Sports Complex; Phoenix, Arizona

Group B
Pos	Team	Pld	W	D	L	GF	GA	GD	Pts	Qualification
1	UC Santa Barbara	2	2	0	0	6	1	+5	6	Advanced to knockout stage
2	Texas A&M	2	1	0	1	1	4	−3	3	Advanced to knockout stage
3	Cornell	2	0	0	2	1	3	−2	0	Consolation

Scores

8:00am MST	UC Santa Barbara	2–1	Cornell	Field 16
Thu, November 19		Report		Stadium: Reach 11 Sports Complex; Phoenix, Arizona

1:15pm MST	Cornell	0–1	Texas A&M	Field 18
Thu, November 19		Report		Stadium: Reach 11 Sports Complex; Phoenix, Arizona

6:30pm MST	Texas A&M	0–4	UC Santa Barbara	Field 15
Thu, November 19		Report		Stadium: Reach 11 Sports Complex; Phoenix, Arizona

Group C
Pos	Team	Pld	W	D	L	GF	GA	GD	Pts	Qualification
1	Florida	2	1	1	0	6	2	+4	4	Advanced to knockout stage
2	Michigan	2	1	1	0	3	2	+1	4	Advanced to knockout stage
3	Northern Arizona	2	0	0	2	0	5	−5	0	Consolation

Scores

8:00am MST	Michigan	1–0	Northern Arizona	Field 17
Thu, November 19		Report		Stadium: Reach 11 Sports Complex; Phoenix, Arizona

1:15pm MST	Northern Arizona	0–4	Florida	Field 15
Thu, November 19		Report		Stadium: Reach 11 Sports Complex; Phoenix, Arizona

6:30pm MST	Florida	2–2	Michigan	Field 18
Thu, November 19		Report		Stadium: Reach 11 Sports Complex; Phoenix, Arizona

Group D
Pos	Team	Pld	W	D	L	GF	GA	GD	Pts	Qualification
1	Pittsburgh	2	1	1	0	1	0	+1	4	Advanced to knockout stage
2	Miami (OH)	2	0	2	0	0	0	0	2	Advanced to knockout stage
3	Texas	2	0	1	1	0	1	−1	1	Consolation

Scores

8:00am MST	Texas	0–0	Miami (OH)	Field 18
Thu, November 19		Report		Stadium: Reach 11 Sports Complex; Phoenix, Arizona

1:15pm MST	Miami (OH)	0–0	Pittsburgh	Field 16
Thu, November 19		Report		Stadium: Reach 11 Sports Complex; Phoenix, Arizona

6:30pm MST	Pittsburgh	1–0	Texas	Field 17
Thu, November 19		Report		Stadium: Reach 11 Sports Complex; Phoenix, Arizona

Group E
Pos	Team	Pld	W	D	L	GF	GA	GD	Pts	Qualification
1	Cal Poly	2	2	0	0	5	1	+4	6	Advanced to knockout stage
2	Illinois	2	1	0	1	3	2	+1	3	Advanced to knockout stage
3	Wash U	2	0	0	2	1	6	−5	0	Consolation

Scores

9:45am MST	Cal Poly	3–1	Wash U	Field 15
Thu, November 19		Report		Stadium: Reach 11 Sports Complex; Phoenix, Arizona

3:00pm MST	Wash U	0–3	Illinois	Field 17
Thu, November 19		Report		Stadium: Reach 11 Sports Complex; Phoenix, Arizona

8:15pm MST	Illinois	0–2	Cal Poly	Field 16
Thu, November 19		Report		Stadium: Reach 11 Sports Complex; Phoenix, Arizona

Group F
Pos	Team	Pld	W	D	L	GF	GA	GD	Pts	Qualification
1	Michigan State	2	1	1	0	2	1	+1	4	Advanced to knockout stage
2	Kansas	2	0	2	0	2	2	0	2	Advanced to knockout stage
3	Colorado	2	0	1	1	1	2	−1	1	Consolation

Scores

9:45am MST	Colorado	0–1	Michigan State	Field 16
Thu, November 19		Report		Stadium: Reach 11 Sports Complex; Phoenix, Arizona

3:00pm MST	Michigan State	1–1	Kansas	Field 18
Thu, November 19		Report		Stadium: Reach 11 Sports Complex; Phoenix, Arizona

8:15pm MST	Kansas	1–1	Colorado	Field 15
Thu, November 19		Report		Stadium: Reach 11 Sports Complex; Phoenix, Arizona

Group G
Pos	Team	Pld	W	D	L	GF	GA	GD	Pts	Qualification
1	Delaware	2	2	0	0	8	1	+6 (Note: Actual GD differs because the max GD for any one game is ±5, which came into effect when Delaware beat CSU Long Beach 6–0)	6	Advanced to knockout stage
2	North Carolina	2	1	0	1	4	3	+1	3	Advanced to knockout stage
3	CSU Long Beach	2	0	0	2	1	9	−7	0	Consolation

Scores

9:45am MST	North Carolina	3–1	CSU Long Beach	Field 17
Thu, November 19		Report		Stadium: Reach 11 Sports Complex; Phoenix, Arizona

3:00pm MST	CSU Long Beach	0–6	Delaware	Field 15
Thu, November 19		Report		Stadium: Reach 11 Sports Complex; Phoenix, Arizona

8:15pm MST	Delaware	2–1	North Carolina	Field 18
Thu, November 19		Report		Stadium: Reach 11 Sports Complex; Phoenix, Arizona

Group H
Pos	Team	Pld	W	D	L	GF	GA	GD	Pts	Qualification
1	Colorado State	2	1	1	0	7	1	+5 (Note: Actual GD differs because the max GD for any one game is ±5, which came into effect when Colorado State beat Arizona 6–0)	4	Advanced to knockout stage
2	Penn State	2	1	1	0	3	1	+2	4	Advanced to knockout stage
3	Arizona	2	0	0	2	0	8	−7	0	Consolation

Scores

9:45am MST	Penn State	2–0	Arizona	Field 18
Thu, November 19		Report		Stadium: Reach 11 Sports Complex; Phoenix, Arizona

3:00pm MST	Arizona	0–6	Colorado State	Field 16
Thu, November 19		Report		Stadium: Reach 11 Sports Complex; Phoenix, Arizona

8:15pm MST	Colorado State	1–1	Penn State	Field 17
Thu, November 19		Report		Stadium: Reach 11 Sports Complex; Phoenix, Arizona

=== Men's open ===
Group A
Pos	Team	Pld	W	D	L	GF	GA	GD	Pts	Qualification
1	Georgia College	3	2	1	0	8	1	+7	7	Advanced to knockout stage
2	Stony Brook	3	2	1	0	5	2	+3	7	Advanced to knockout stage
3	UW-Milwaukee	3	1	0	2	2	6	−4	3	
4	Colorado Mines – B	3	0	0	3	0	6	−6	0	

Scores

8:00am MST	Stony Brook	2–0	Colorado Mines – B	Field 5
Thu, November 19		Report		Stadium: Reach 11 Sports Complex; Phoenix, Arizona

8:00am MST	UW-Milwaukee	0–4	Georgia College	Field 6
Thu, November 19		Report		Stadium: Reach 11 Sports Complex; Phoenix, Arizona

3:00pm MST	Georgia College	1–1	Stony Brook	Field 7
Thu, November 19		Report		Stadium: Reach 11 Sports Complex; Phoenix, Arizona

3:00pm MST	Colorado Mines – B	0–1	UW-Milwaukee	Field 8
Thu, November 19		Report		Stadium: Reach 11 Sports Complex; Phoenix, Arizona

8:00am MST	Stony Brook	2–1	UW-Milwaukee	Field 9
Fri, November 20		Report		Stadium: Reach 11 Sports Complex; Phoenix, Arizona

8:00am MST	Georgia College	3–0	Colorado Mines – B	Field 10
Fri, November 20		Report		Stadium: Reach 11 Sports Complex; Phoenix, Arizona

Group B
Pos	Team	Pld	W	D	L	GF	GA	GD	Pts	Qualification
1	Oregon	3	3	0	0	9	1	+8	9	Advanced to knockout stage
2	CSU-Pueblo	3	1	1	1	4	7	−3	4	
3	UConn	3	1	0	2	5	5	0	3	
4	Texas – B	3	0	1	2	2	7	−5	1	

Scores

8:00am MST	UConn	1–2	CSU-Pueblo	Field 7
Thu, November 19		Report		Stadium: Reach 11 Sports Complex; Phoenix, Arizona

8:00am MST	Oregon	2–0	Texas – B	Field 8
Thu, November 19		Report		Stadium: Reach 11 Sports Complex; Phoenix, Arizona

3:00pm MST	Texas – B	0–3	UConn	Field 9
Thu, November 19		Report		Stadium: Reach 11 Sports Complex; Phoenix, Arizona

3:00pm MST	CSU-Pueblo	0–4	Oregon	Field 10
Thu, November 19		Report		Stadium: Reach 11 Sports Complex; Phoenix, Arizona

8:00am MST	UConn	1–3	Oregon	Field 5
Fri, November 20		Report		Stadium: Reach 11 Sports Complex; Phoenix, Arizona

8:00am MST	Texas – B	2–2	CSU-Pueblo	Field 6
Fri, November 20		Report		Stadium: Reach 11 Sports Complex; Phoenix, Arizona

Group C
Pos	Team	Pld	W	D	L	GF	GA	GD	Pts	Qualification
1	Purdue	3	2	0	1	5	5	0	6	Advanced to knockout stage
2	Boston College	3	1	1	1	7	7	0	4	
3	Kennesaw St.	3	1	1	1	5	7	−2	4	
4	Texas Tech	3	1	0	2	8	6	+2	3	

Scores

8:00am MST	Texas Tech	4–0	Kennesaw St.	Field 9
Thu, November 19		Report		Stadium: Reach 11 Sports Complex; Phoenix, Arizona

8:00am MST	Boston College	1–2	Purdue	Field 10
Thu, November 19		Report		Stadium: Reach 11 Sports Complex; Phoenix, Arizona

3:00pm MST	Purdue	2–1	Texas Tech	Field 5
Thu, November 19		Report		Stadium: Reach 11 Sports Complex; Phoenix, Arizona

3:00pm MST	Kennesaw St.	2–2	Boston College	Field 6
Thu, November 19		Report		Stadium: Reach 11 Sports Complex; Phoenix, Arizona

8:00am MST	Texas Tech	3–4	Boston College	Field 7
Fri, November 20		Report		Stadium: Reach 11 Sports Complex; Phoenix, Arizona

8:00am MST	Purdue	1–3	Kennesaw St.	Field 8
Fri, November 20		Report		Stadium: Reach 11 Sports Complex; Phoenix, Arizona

Group D
Pos	Team	Pld	W	D	L	GF	GA	GD	Pts	Qualification
1	UC Davis	3	3	0	0	4	0	+4	9	Advanced to knockout stage
2	Illinois – B	3	1	1	1	3	2	+1	4	
3	Villanova	3	1	0	2	2	5	−3	3	
4	St. Edward's	3	0	1	2	2	4	−2	1	

Scores

9:45am MST	UC Davis	1–0	St. Edward's	Field 5
Thu, November 19		Report		Stadium: Reach 11 Sports Complex; Phoenix, Arizona

9:45am MST	Illinois – B	2–0	Villanova	Field 6
Thu, November 19		Report		Stadium: Reach 11 Sports Complex; Phoenix, Arizona

4:45pm MST	Villanova	0–2	UC Davis	Field 7
Thu, November 19		Report		Stadium: Reach 11 Sports Complex; Phoenix, Arizona

4:45pm MST	St. Edward's	1–1	Illinois – B	Field 8
Thu, November 19		Report		Stadium: Reach 11 Sports Complex; Phoenix, Arizona

10:00am MST	UC Davis	1–0	Illinois – B	Field 9
Fri, November 20		Report		Stadium: Reach 11 Sports Complex; Phoenix, Arizona

10:00am MST	Villanova	2–1	St. Edward's	Field 10
Fri, November 20		Report		Stadium: Reach 11 Sports Complex; Phoenix, Arizona

Group E
Pos	Team	Pld	W	D	L	GF	GA	GD	Pts	Qualification
1	Utah Valley	3	1	2	0	4	2	+2	5	Advanced to knockout stage
2	SUNY-Brockport	3	1	2	0	5	4	+1	5	Advanced to knockout stage
3	Colorado	3	1	0	2	1	4	−3	3	
4	Arkansas	3	0	2	1	1	1	0	2	

Scores

9:45am MST	Arkansas	1–1	SUNY-Brockport	Field 7
Thu, November 19		Report		Stadium: Reach 11 Sports Complex; Phoenix, Arizona

9:45am MST	Colorado	0–2	Utah Valley	Field 8
Thu, November 19		Report		Stadium: Reach 11 Sports Complex; Phoenix, Arizona

4:45pm MST	Utah Valley	0–0	Arkansas	Field 9
Thu, November 19		Report		Stadium: Reach 11 Sports Complex; Phoenix, Arizona

4:45pm MST	SUNY-Brockport	2–1	Colorado	Field 10
Thu, November 19		Report		Stadium: Reach 11 Sports Complex; Phoenix, Arizona

10:00am MST	Arkansas	0–0	Colorado	Field 5
Fri, November 20		Report		Stadium: Reach 11 Sports Complex; Phoenix, Arizona

10:00am MST	Utah Valley	2–2	SUNY-Brockport	Field 6
Fri, November 20		Report		Stadium: Reach 11 Sports Complex; Phoenix, Arizona

Group F
Pos	Team	Pld	W	D	L	GF	GA	GD	Pts	Qualification
1	Cal State Fullerton	3	2	0	0	5	4	+1	6	Advanced to knockout stage
2	Kansas State	3	1	1	1	2	3	−1	4	
3	Denver	3	1	1	1	3	2	+1	4	
4	JMU	3	0	2	1	2	3	−1	2	

Scores

9:45am MST	JMU	1–1	Denver	Field 9
Thu, November 19		Report		Stadium: Reach 11 Sports Complex; Phoenix, Arizona

9:45am MST	Kansas State	1–3	Cal State Fullerton	Field 10
Thu, November 19		Report		Stadium: Reach 11 Sports Complex; Phoenix, Arizona

4:45pm MST	Cal State Fullerton	2–1	JMU	Field 5
Thu, November 19		Report		Stadium: Reach 11 Sports Complex; Phoenix, Arizona

4:45pm MST	Denver	0–1	Kansas State	Field 6
Thu, November 19		Report		Stadium: Reach 11 Sports Complex; Phoenix, Arizona

10:00am MST	JMU	0–0	Kansas State	Field 7
Fri, November 20		Report		Stadium: Reach 11 Sports Complex; Phoenix, Arizona

10:00am MST	Cal State Fullerton	0–2	Denver	Field 8
Fri, November 20		Report		Stadium: Reach 11 Sports Complex; Phoenix, Arizona

=== Women's open ===
Group A
Pos	Team	Pld	W	D	L	GF	GA	GD	Pts	Qualification
1	UConn	3	2	1	0	8	3	+5	7	Advanced to knockout stage
2	JMU	3	2	1	0	6	2	+4	7	Advanced to knockout stage
3	Arizona St.	3	1	0	2	3	6	−3	3	
4	Iowa	3	0	0	3	2	8	−6	0	

Scores

11:30am MST	JMU	1–1	UConn	Field 5
Thu, November 19		Report		Stadium: Reach 11 Sports Complex; Phoenix, Arizona

11:30am MST	Arizona St.	2–0	Iowa	Field 6
Thu, November 19		Report		Stadium: Reach 11 Sports Complex; Phoenix, Arizona

6:30pm MST	Iowa	0–2	JMU	Field 7
Thu, November 19		Report		Stadium: Reach 11 Sports Complex; Phoenix, Arizona

6:30pm MST	UConn	3–0	Arizona St.	Field 8
Thu, November 19		Report		Stadium: Reach 11 Sports Complex; Phoenix, Arizona

12:00pm MST	JMU	3–1	Arizona St.	Field 9
Fri, November 20		Report		Stadium: Reach 11 Sports Complex; Phoenix, Arizona

12:00pm MST	Iowa	2–4	UConn	Field 10
Fri, November 20		Report		Stadium: Reach 11 Sports Complex; Phoenix, Arizona

Group B
Pos	Team	Pld	W	D	L	GF	GA	GD	Pts	Qualification
1	Southern Cal (USC)	3	2	1	0	8	2	+6	7	Advanced to knockout stage
2	Vermont	3	2	1	0	5	2	+3	7	Advanced to knockout stage
3	Miami (FL)	3	1	0	2	5	4	+1	3	
4	St. Edward's	3	0	0	3	1	11	−10	0	

Scores

11:30am MST	USC	5–1	St. Edward's	Field 7
Thu, November 19		Report		Stadium: Reach 11 Sports Complex; Phoenix, Arizona

11:30am MST	Miami (FL)	1–2	Vermont	Field 8
Thu, November 19		Report		Stadium: Reach 11 Sports Complex; Phoenix, Arizona

6:30pm MST	Vermont	1–1	USC	Field 9
Thu, November 19		Report		Stadium: Reach 11 Sports Complex; Phoenix, Arizona

6:30pm MST	St. Edward's	0–4	Miami (FL)	Field 10
Thu, November 19		Report		Stadium: Reach 11 Sports Complex; Phoenix, Arizona

12:00pm MST	USC	2–0	Miami (FL)	Field 5
Fri, November 20		Report		Stadium: Reach 11 Sports Complex; Phoenix, Arizona

12:00pm MST	Vermont	2–0	St. Edward's	Field 6
Fri, November 20		Report		Stadium: Reach 11 Sports Complex; Phoenix, Arizona

Group C
Pos	Team	Pld	W	D	L	GF	GA	GD	Pts	Qualification
1	Colorado "Black"	2	2	0	0	3	1	+3	9	Advanced to knockout stage
2	San Diego St.	2	1	0	1	5	2	+4	6	
3	Texas Tech	2	0	0	2	0	5	−4	3	
4	Unable to field team, all teams awarded 3 points and +1 goal difference									

Scores

11:30am MST	San Diego St.	4–0	Texas Tech	Field 10
Thu, November 19		Report		Stadium: Reach 11 Sports Complex; Phoenix, Arizona

6:30pm MST	Texas Tech	0–1	Colorado "Black"	Field 5
Thu, November 19		Report		Stadium: Reach 11 Sports Complex; Phoenix, Arizona

12:00pm MST	Colorado "Black"	2–1	San Diego St.	Field 7
Fri, November 20		Report		Stadium: Reach 11 Sports Complex; Phoenix, Arizona

Group D
Pos	Team	Pld	W	D	L	GF	GA	GD	Pts	Qualification
1	Boston College	3	2	1	0	5	1	+4	7	Advanced to knockout stage
2	Oregon	3	2	0	1	8	1	+6 (Note: Actual GD differs because the max GD for any one game is ±5, which came into effect when Oregon beat Vanderbilt 6–0)	6	
3	Rice	3	0	2	1	1	3	−2	2	
4	Vanderbilt	3	0	1	2	0	9	−8	1	

Scores

1:15pm MST	Oregon	2–0	Rice	Field 5
Thu, November 19		Report		Stadium: Reach 11 Sports Complex; Phoenix, Arizona

1:15pm MST	Boston College	3–0	Vanderbilt	Field 6
Thu, November 19		Report		Stadium: Reach 11 Sports Complex; Phoenix, Arizona

8:15pm MST	Vanderbilt	0–6	Oregon	Field 7
Thu, November 19		Report		Stadium: Reach 11 Sports Complex; Phoenix, Arizona

8:15pm MST	Rice	1–1	Boston College	Field 8
Thu, November 19		Report		Stadium: Reach 11 Sports Complex; Phoenix, Arizona

2:00pm MST	Oregon	0–1	Boston College	Field 9
Fri, November 20		Report		Stadium: Reach 11 Sports Complex; Phoenix, Arizona

2:00pm MST	Vanderbilt	0–0	Rice	Field 10
Fri, November 20		Report		Stadium: Reach 11 Sports Complex; Phoenix, Arizona

Group E
Pos	Team	Pld	W	D	L	GF	GA	GD	Pts	Qualification
1	UCLA	3	2	1	0	7	0	+7	7	Advanced to knockout stage
2	Penn	3	2	0	1	4	4	0	6	
3	UCF	3	1	1	1	2	2	0	4	
4	UW-Milwaukee	3	0	0	3	0	7	−7	0	

Scores

1:15pm MST	UCLA	3–0	UW-Milwaukee	Field 7
Thu, November 19		Report		Stadium: Reach 11 Sports Complex; Phoenix, Arizona

1:15pm MST	UCF	0–2	Penn	Field 8
Thu, November 19		Report		Stadium: Reach 11 Sports Complex; Phoenix, Arizona

8:15pm MST	Penn	0–4	UCLA	Field 9
Thu, November 19		Report		Stadium: Reach 11 Sports Complex; Phoenix, Arizona

8:15pm MST	UW-Milwaukee	0–2	UCF	Field 10
Thu, November 19		Report		Stadium: Reach 11 Sports Complex; Phoenix, Arizona

2:00pm MST	UCLA	0–0	UCF	Field 5
Fri, November 20		Report		Stadium: Reach 11 Sports Complex; Phoenix, Arizona

2:00pm MST	Penn	2–0	UW-Milwaukee	Field 6
Fri, November 20		Report		Stadium: Reach 11 Sports Complex; Phoenix, Arizona

Group F
Pos	Team	Pld	W	D	L	GF	GA	GD	Pts	Qualification
1	UC-Berkeley	3	2	1	0	4	0	+4	7	Advanced to knockout stage
2	Northeastern	3	1	2	0	4	0	+4	5	
3	TCU	3	1	1	1	1	1	0	4	
4	Denver	3	0	0	3	0	8	−8	0	

Scores

1:15pm MST	Northeastern	4–0	Denver	Field 9
Thu, November 19		Report		Stadium: Reach 11 Sports Complex; Phoenix, Arizona

1:15pm MST	UC-Berkeley	1–0	TCU	Field 10
Thu, November 19		Report		Stadium: Reach 11 Sports Complex; Phoenix, Arizona

8:15pm MST	TCU	0–0	Northeastern	Field 5
Thu, November 19		Report		Stadium: Reach 11 Sports Complex; Phoenix, Arizona

8:15pm MST	Denver	0–3	UC-Berkeley	Field 6
Thu, November 19		Report		Stadium: Reach 11 Sports Complex; Phoenix, Arizona

2:00pm MST	Northeastern	0–0	UC-Berkeley	Field 7
Fri, November 20		Report		Stadium: Reach 11 Sports Complex; Phoenix, Arizona

2:00pm MST	TCU	1–0	Denver	Field 8
Fri, November 20		Report		Stadium: Reach 11 Sports Complex; Phoenix, Arizona

== Tournament bracket ==
=== Men's championship ===
Sweet 16
Fri • 10:00am • Field 11
Michigan	1
North Carolina	4
Fri • 10:00am • Field 12
UCF (pen.)	2 (3)
Missouri	2 (2)
Fri • 10:00am • Field 13
UTEP	2
UCLA	0
Fri • 10:00am • Field 14
Delaware	0
Illinois	1
Fri • 12:00pm • Field 11
Texas A&M	1
Colorado State	0
Fri • 12:00pm • Field 12
Penn State	1
Cornell	0
Fri • 12:00pm • Field 13
Wisconsin	0
Weber State	1
Fri • 12:00pm • Field 14
Cal Poly	1
Florida State	2

Quarterfinals
Fri • 4:00pm • Field 13
North Carolina (a.e.t.)	3
UCF	2
Fri • 4:00pm • Field 14
UTEP	1 (4)
Illinois (pen.)	1 (5)
Fri • 6:00pm • Field 13
Texas A&M	0
Penn State	1
Fri • 6:00pm • Field 14
Weber State (a.e.t.)	3
Florida State	2

Semifinals
Sat • 10:00am • Field 15
North Carolina (pen.)	0 (8)
Illinois	0 (7)
Sat • 10:00am • Field 16
Penn State	2
Weber State	1

Final
Sat • 5:00pm • Field 16
North Carolina	2
Penn State	0

==== Men's consolation ====
Quarterfinals
Fri • 4:00pm • Field 5
UC-Berkeley (a.e.t.)	1
Colorado Mines	0
Fri • 4:00pm • Field 6
Cincinnati	2
Virginia Tech	3
Fri • 6:00pm • Field 5
Minnesota	3
Texas	1
Fri • 6:00pm • Field 6
Loyola-Chicago	3
Iowa State	2

Semifinals
Sat • 8:00am • Field 15
UC-Berkeley	5
Virginia Tech	0
Sat • 8:00am • Field 16
Minnesota	2
Loyola-Chicago	1

Final
Sat • 1:00pm • Field 11
UC-Berkeley	1
Minnesota	0

=== Women's championship ===
Sweet 16
Fri • 10:00am • Field 15
Ohio State	0 (3)
Miami (OH) (pen.)	0 (5)
Fri • 10:00am • Field 16
Colorado State	2
Illinois	0
Fri • 10:00am • Field 17
Delaware	5
Kansas	0
Fri • 10:00am • Field 18
UC-Santa Barbara	0
Michigan (a.e.t.)	1
Fri • 12:00pm • Field 15
Florida	1
Texas A&M	0
Fri • 12:00pm • Field 16
Michigan State	1
North Carolina	0
Fri • 12:00pm • Field 17
Cal Poly	3
Penn State	1
Fri • 12:00pm • Field 18
Pitt	0
Virginia Tech	1

Quarterfinals
Fri • 4:00pm • Field 11
Miami (OH)	0 (0)
Colorado State (pen.)	0 (1)
Fri • 4:00pm • Field 12
Delaware	0
Michigan	1
Fri • 6:00pm • Field 11
Florida	0
Michigan State	2
Fri • 6:00pm • Field 12
Cal Poly	3
Virginia Tech (a.e.t.)	4

Semifinals
Sat • 10:00am • Field 17
Colorado State (pen.)	1 (4)
Michigan	1 (2)
Sat • 10:00am • Field 18
Michigan State (a.e.t.)	3
Virginia Tech	2

Final
Sat • 3:00pm • Field 16
Colorado State	0
Michigan State (a.e.t.)	1

==== Women's consolation ====
Quarterfinals
Fri • 4:00pm • Field 8
Colorado Mines	2
Wash U	0
Fri • 4:00pm • Field 9
Colorado	2
Cornell	0
Fri • 6:00pm • Field 8
Northern Arizona (pen.)	2 (5)
CSU Long Beach	2 (4)
Fri • 6:00pm • Field 9
Arizona	0
Texas	1

Semifinals
Sat • 8:00am • Field 17
Colorado Mines	0
Colorado	3
Sat • 8:00am • Field 18
Northern Arizona	0
Texas	2

Final
Sat • 1:00pm • Field 12
Colorado	1
Texas	0

=== Men's open ===
Quarterfinals
Fri • 4:00pm • Field 15
Utah Valley	1
Cal State Fullerton	0
Fri • 4:00pm • Field 16
Oregon	2
Stony Brook	0
Fri • 4:00pm • Field 17
Georgia College	1
Purdue	5
Fri • 4:00pm • Field 18
UC-Davis	4
SUNY-Brockport	1

Semifinals
Sat • 8:00am • Field 11
Utah Valley	1
Oregon	4
Sat • 8:00am • Field 12
Purdue	0
UC-Davis	1

Final
Sat • 1:00pm • Field 14
Oregon (a.e.t.)	3
UC Davis	2

=== Women's open ===
Quarterfinals
Fri • 8:00pm • Field 15
USC	0
Boston College (a.e.t.)	1
Fri • 8:00pm • Field 16
Colorado "Black"	0 (2)
JMU (pen.)	0 (3)
Fri • 8:00pm • Field 17
UConn	2
UC-Berkeley	0
Fri • 8:00pm • Field 18
UCLA	3
Vermont	0

Semifinals
Sat • 8:00am • Field 13
Boston College	0
JMU	1
Sat • 8:00am • Field 14
UConn	2
UCLA (a.e.t.)	3

Final
Sat • 1:00pm • Field 13
JMU	0
UCLA	2
