= 2016 NIRSA National Soccer Championship =

- League: NIRSA
- Sport: Soccer
- Site: Foley Sports Tourism Complex; Foley, Alabama
- Duration: November 17–19, 2016
- Teams: 24
- Results: Official Results

Men's Championship Division
- Score: 3–2
- Champion: Virginia (1st title, 1st title game)
- Runners-up: Ohio State (2nd title game)
- Season MVP: Tyler Miller-Jones (Virginia)

Women's Championship Division
- Score: 1–0
- Champion: UC-Santa Barbara (7th title, 9th title game)
- Runners-up: North Carolina (1st title game)
- Season MVP: Lindsay Ringman (UC-Santa Barbara)

Men's Open Division
- Score: 2–1
- Champion: Penn State (1st title, 2nd title game)
- Runners-up: Oregon (4th title game)
- Season MVP: Matthew Lundstrom (Penn State)

Women's Open Division
- Score: 2–1
- Champion: Virginia Tech (2nd title, 3rd title game)
- Runners-up: Oregon (2nd title game)
- Top seed: Emily Fitzsimmons (Virginia Tech)

NIRSA national soccer championships seasons
- ← 2015 2017 →

The 2016 NIRSA national soccer championship was the 23rd NIRSA National Soccer Championships, the annual national championships for United States-based, collegiate club soccer teams organized by NIRSA. It took place at the Foley Sports Tourism Complex in Foley, Alabama from Thursday, November 17 to Saturday, November 19, 2016.

== Overview ==
=== Men's championship ===
In the finals, 2014 champions, Ohio State, would face finals debutants Virginia. Prior to this, in the group stage, Ohio State would win their opener 2–1 over Utah State then beat North Texas 4–1 to top their group. Meanwhile, Virginia would win their opener 1–0 over Saint Louis to secure a spot in the knockout round but would drop the finale 1–0 to 2014 runner-up San Diego State to finish second in their group.

In the knockout round, Ohio State would defeat 2008 runner-up, Colorado State, 2–1 in the round of 16 then would defeat 2004 champion, Texas A&M, 3–0 in the quarterfinals while Virginia would defeat 2006 champions, Michigan, 1–0 in the round of 16 then would defeat Delaware 1–0 in the quarterfinals to make their first semifinals. In a rematch of the 2014 national championship game, Ohio State would defeat San Diego State, once again, by a score of 2–1 with a golden goal in overtime to make their second national title game in 3 years while Virginia would defeat Cincinnati 1–0 to make their first national championship game.

In the finals, eventual tournament MVP, Tyler Miller-Jones of Virginia, scored the game's first goal in the 11th minute but Ohio State would counter with a goal a minute later, tying the game at 1–1. In the 24th minute, Virginia would retake the lead from a goal by Tysen Tresness and then double their advantage right before halftime on a goal by Brian Leibowitz, and take their 3–1 advantage into halftime. Ohio State would score with 25 minutes left in the match but, despite a barrage of shots, eventual tournament most outstanding goalkeeper, Blake Ruzich of Virginia, wouldn't give up any more goals, giving Virginia their first national title with a 3–2 victory. This was the second year in a row a Region II team would claim the men's national title despite not winning any of the previous 21 iterations.

=== Women's championship ===
In the finals, six time national champion, UC-Santa Barbara, would face region II tournament champions, North Carolina, who were making their first finals appearance. Prior to this, in the group stage, UC-Santa Barbara would win their opener 2–0 over Florida State and would top their group despite a 0–0 draw against Illinois. Meanwhile, North Carolina would defeat Kansas 1–0 then defeat 2008 runners-up, Arizona, 5–1 to also top their group.

In the knockout round, UC-Santa Barbara would defeat Gonzaga 1–0 in the round of 16 then would defeat Texas A&M 2–0 to advance to the semifinals. Meanwhile, North Carolina would defeat Colorado Mines 2–0 in the round of 16 then would defeat UConn 3–0 in the quarterfinals to advance to their first semifinal since 1998. In the semifinals, in a rematch of the 2012 national championship, UC-Santa Barbara would face Michigan State. The game would remain deadlocked at 0–0 after regulation and extra time meaning, just like in 2012, penalties would be required to determine a winner. This time, however, UC-Santa Barbara would emerge victorious in the shootout with a score of 4–2 to advance to their first finals since that 2012 Michigan State game. Meanwhile, North Carolina would defeat 2014 national champion, Ohio State, 2–1 to advance to their first finals.

In the finals, eventual MVP Lindsay Ringman of UC-Santa Barbara opened the scoring in the 35th minute. Despite eight shots on goal from North Carolina, none were able to get past eventual most outstanding goalkeeper, Lauren Racioppi of UCSB, and UC-Santa Barbara would go on to win their 7th national title 1–0 and would not concede the entirer tournament.

=== Men's open ===
In the finals, last year's championship finalist Penn State would take on familiar face Oregon who were looking to defend their open title in their 4th open division finals. Penn State took the lead in the first half from eventual Tournament MVP Matthew Lundstrom, but midway through the second half, Oregon would equalize with a goal from Rikunosuke Kawashima. In the 70th minute, Robbie Edwards of Penn State would retake the lead off of a header, which was all that was needed for them to claim their first open division title in a 2–1 win.

=== Women's open ===
In the finals, Virginia Tech would face Oregon. Despite needing a seven-round PK shootout in the semifinals against defending champion UCLA, Virginia Tech dominated their first 3 games of the tournament by scoring 15 goals while only giving up 1. Oregon were also dominate by scoring 13 goals in their previous four games while only giving up 3. Virginia Tech started hot by scoring 2 goals in the first five minutes with the first coming from eventual MVP Emily Fitzsimmons. However, these were the only goals they would score, meaning when Meghan Schroeder of Oregon scored in the 66th minute, it was just a one goal game. Eventual Most Outstanding Goalkeeper Catherine McNicol of Virginia Tech would ensure that the two goals scored in the first five minutes would be enough, as Virginia Tech went on to win 2–1 for their second women's open national title.

== Format ==
The competition consisted of 96 teams: 48 men's teams and 48 women's teams. Each of these divisions were further divided into two 24-team divisions: the championship and open. The championship division divided teams into eight groups of three while the open division divided teams into six groups of four, both engaging in a round-robin tournament that determined teams able to advance to a knockout stage.

Pool play games were two 40-minute halves, separated by a seven-minute halftime and utilized the three points for a win system. In the championship division, the two highest ranked teams from each group advanced to their knockout stage, with the third placed team advancing to a consolation bracket. In the open division, the top team from each group as well as the two best second placed teams advanced to their knockout stage.

Tie-breaking criteria for group play
The ranking of teams in each group was based on the following criteria in order:
1. Highest number of points
2. Winner of head-to-head competition
3. Greatest goal difference
  - Maximum ± 5 goal difference per match
4. Most goals scored
5. Most shutouts

In a tie breaking scenario involving more than 2 teams, the tiebreaker procedure would begin. If one team is identified as different and both remaining teams are still tied, the tie breaker procedure is restarted.

If a tie still remained after the first 5 criteria, the following was used to break a tie:

1. NCAA kicks from the mark
  - If there was a three-way tie, a coin-flip would be conducted. The two teams that chose the same outcome would compete in kicks from the mark between each other. The winner would compete with the last remaining team in kicks from the mark
  - If there's a four-way tie, a drawing of lots would be conducted (only could occur in open division)

Knockout stage games also consisted of two 40-minute halves. The round of 16 and quarterfinals were separated by a seven-minute halftime while the semifinals and finals had a ten minute halftime. Knockout stage games needed to declare a winner. If a knockout-stage game was tied at the end of regulation, overtime would begin. Overtime consisted of one, 15-minute, golden-goal period. If still tied after overtime, kicks from the mark would determine the winner.

== Qualification and selections ==
Each of the six regions received three automatic bids for both the men's and women's championship that they awarded to its members. The final six bids are considered "at-large", and were given out by NIRSA to teams, typically based on the regional tournament results and RPI.

The 48 remaining teams participated in the open division and were selected via a lottery draw that aired on YouTube on October 4, 2016 at 1pm PST. Any team with membership in a NIRSA-affiliated league or with a minimum of four games played prior to the tournament were able to enter their name into the lottery. If a selected team qualified for the championship division, an alternate would take their spot. 50 men's teams and 40 women's teams were selected.

=== Men's championship ===
Automatic bids
Region	Team	Appearance	Last Bid
I	Delaware	11th	2015
I	Tufts	2nd	2014
I	UConn	3rd	2014
II	North Carolina	12th	2015
II	Virginia	8th	2014
II	UCF	3rd	2015
III	Ohio State	11th	2014
III	Michigan State	9th	2014
III	Wisconsin	2nd	2015
IV	Texas A&M	17th	2015
IV	North Texas	2nd	2005
IV	Saint Louis	1st	Never
V	Colorado State	19th	2015
V	Minnesota	13th	2015
V	Colorado Mines	6th	2015
VI	San Diego State	5th	2014
VI	Utah State	2nd	2014
VI	Long Beach State	1st	Never

At-large bids
Region	Team	Appearance	Last Bid
II	Florida	10th	2014
II	Georgia Tech	3rd	2004
III	Michigan	13th	2015
III	Cincinnati	5th	2015
V	Colorado	15th	2013
VI	Stanford	1st	Never

=== Women's championship ===
Automatic bids
Region	Team	Appearance	Last Bid
I	Penn State	21st	2015
I	Syracuse	1st	Never
I	UConn	1st	Never
II	Florida	14th	2015
II	North Carolina	13th	2015
II	Virginia	9th	2014
III	Miami (OH)	16th	2015
III	Michigan State	13th	2015
III	Illinois	12th	2015
IV	Texas	17th	2015
IV	Texas A&M	17th	2015
IV	Kansas	7th	2015
V	Colorado	22nd	2015
V	Colorado State	20th	2015
V	Colorado Mines	5th	2015
VI	UC-Santa Barbara	16th	2015
VI	Arizona	9th	2015
VI	Gonzaga	1st	Never

At-large bids
Region	Team	Appearance	Last Bid
I	Delaware	14th	2015
II	Florida State	3rd	2014
III	Ohio State	16th	2015
III	Wisconsin	1st	Never
VI	Cal Poly	6th	2015
VI	UC-San Diego	1st	Never

=== Men's open ===
Full men's lottery selections
Region	Team	Selection Type	Bid result
I	Babson	Automatic	Not accepted
I	Penn State	Automatic	Accepted
I	SUNY Cortland	Automatic	Accepted
I	Boston College	Automatic	Accepted
I	Towson	Automatic	Accepted
I	George Mason	Waitlist	Accepted from waitlist
I	Cornell	Waitlist	Not given
I	UConn	Waitlist	Championship
I	SUNY Brockport	Waitlist	Not given
I	Penn	Waitlist	Not given
I	Fordham	Waitlist	Not given
I	Northeastern	Waitlist	Not given
II	East Carolina	Automatic	Accepted
II	Miami (FL)	Automatic	Accepted
II	Wake Forest	Automatic	Not accepted
II	Dalton State	Automatic	Not accepted
II	JMU	Waitlist	Accepted from waitlist
II	Georgia Tech	Waitlist	Championship
II	MTSU	Waitlist	Not accepted
II	Georgia College	Waitlist	Accepted from waitlist
II	Troy	Waitlist	Not given
II	NC State	Waitlist	Not given
II	Virginia Tech	Waitlist	Not given
II	UNC-Greensboro	Waitlist	Not given
II	Kennesaw State	Waitlist	Not given
II	Old Dominion	Waitlist	Not given
II	Clemson	Waitlist	Not given
III	Purdue	Automatic	Accepted
III	Cincinnati	Automatic	Championship
III	Illinois	Automatic	Accepted
IV	Houston CC	Automatic	Accepted
IV	Texas	Automatic	Accepted
IV	St. Edwards	Automatic	Accepted
IV	LSU	Automatic	Accepted
IV	Texas Tech	Waitlist	Not accepted
IV	Arkansas	Waitlist	Accepted from waitlist
IV	Missouri	Waitlist	Not given
IV	Wash U	Waitlist	Not given
IV	Kansas	Waitlist	Not given
V	Iowa State	Automatic	Accepted
V	Colorado State-Pueblo	Automatic	Not accepted
V	Colorado Springs	Automatic	Accepted
V	Colorado State	Automatic	Championship
V	Denver	Waitlist	Not given
V	Colorado	Waitlist	Championship
VI	Utah Valley State	Automatic	Accepted
VI	San Diego State	Automatic	Championship
VI	Cal State Fullerton	Automatic	Accepted
VI	UCLA	Automatic	Accepted
VI	Oregon	Waitlist	Accepted from waitlist

Participating men's lottery teams
Region	Team	Selection Type	Bid result
I	Penn State	Automatic	Accepted
I	SUNY Cortland	Automatic	Accepted
I	Boston College	Automatic	Accepted
I	Towson	Automatic	Accepted
I	George Mason	Waitlist	Accepted from waitlist
II	East Carolina	Automatic	Accepted
II	Miami (FL)	Automatic	Accepted
II	JMU	Waitlist	Accepted from waitlist
II	Georgia College	Waitlist	Accepted from waitlist
III	Miami (OH)	Invite	Accepted via invite
III	Purdue	Automatic	Accepted
III	Illinois	Automatic	Accepted
IV	Houston CC	Automatic	Accepted
IV	Texas	Automatic	Accepted
IV	St. Edwards	Automatic	Accepted
IV	LSU	Automatic	Accepted
IV	Arkansas	Waitlist	Accepted from waitlist
V	Iowa State	Automatic	Accepted
V	Colorado Springs	Automatic	Accepted
VI	Cal Poly	Invite	Accepted via invite
VI	Utah Valley State	Automatic	Accepted
VI	Cal State Fullerton	Automatic	Accepted
VI	UCLA	Automatic	Accepted
VI	Oregon	Waitlist	Accepted from waitlist

=== Women's open ===
Full women's lottery selections
Region	Team	Selection Type	Bid result
I	Boston College	Automatic	Accepted
I	Vermont	Automatic	Accepted
I	George Mason	Automatic	Accepted
I	Northeastern	Automatic	Not accepted
I	Penn	Automatic	Accepted
I	Penn State	Waitlist	Championship
I	Cornell	Waitlist	Accepted from waitlist
I	SUNY Cortland	Waitlist	Not given
I	Fordham	Waitlist	Not given
I	UConn	Waitlist	Championship
I	Towson	Waitlist	Not given
I	Pitt	Waitlist	Not given
II	West Virginia	Automatic	Accepted
II	Virginia Tech	Automatic	Accepted
II	Georgia Southern	Automatic	Accepted
II	Georgia Tech	Automatic	Accepted
II	Miami (FL)	Waitlist	Accepted from waitlist
II	JMU	Waitlist	Accepted from waitlist
II	Tennessee	Waitlist	Not given
II	Vanderbilt	Waitlist	Not given
III	Ohio	Automatic	Accepted
III	Illinois	Automatic	Championship
III	Iowa	Automatic	Accepted
IV	Houston CC	Automatic	Accepted
IV	Kansas	Automatic	Championship
IV	Missouri	Automatic	Accepted
IV	TCU	Automatic	Not accepted
IV	St. Edwards	Waitlist	Not accepted
IV	Texas Tech	Waitlist	Not accepted
V	Iowa State	Automatic	Accepted
V	UNI	Automatic	Accepted
V	Denver	Automatic	Accepted
V	Air Force	Automatic	Accepted
V	Colorado	Waitlist	Accepted from waitlist
V	Colorado Springs	Waitlist	Not given
VI	USC	Automatic	Accepted
VI	Oregon	Automatic	Accepted
VI	UCLA	Automatic	Accepted
VI	San Diego State	Automatic	Accepted
VI	UC-Santa Barbara	Waitlist	Championship

Participating women's lottery teams
Region	Team	Selection Type	Bid result
I	Boston College	Automatic	Accepted
I	Vermont	Automatic	Accepted
I	George Mason	Automatic	Accepted
I	Penn	Automatic	Accepted
I	Cornell	Waitlist	Accepted from waitlist
II	West Virginia	Automatic	Accepted
II	Virginia Tech	Automatic	Accepted
II	Georgia Southern	Automatic	Accepted
II	Georgia Tech	Automatic	Accepted
II	Miami (FL)	Waitlist	Accepted from waitlist
II	JMU	Waitlist	Accepted from waitlist
III	Ohio	Automatic	Accepted
III	Iowa	Automatic	Accepted
IV	Houston CC	Automatic	Accepted
IV	Missouri	Automatic	Accepted
V	Iowa State	Automatic	Accepted
V	Northern Iowa (UNI)	Automatic	Accepted
V	Denver	Automatic	Accepted
V	Air Force	Automatic	Accepted
V	Colorado	Waitlist	Accepted from waitlist
VI	USC	Automatic	Accepted
VI	Oregon	Automatic	Accepted
VI	UCLA	Automatic	Accepted
VI	San Diego State	Automatic	Accepted

== Group stage ==
=== Men's championship ===
Group A
Pos	Team	Pld	W	D	L	GF	GA	GD	Pts	Qualification
1	Stanford	2	2	0	0	4	1	+3	6	Advanced to knockout stage
2	Delaware	2	1	0	1	2	3	−1	3	Advanced to knockout stage
3	UCF	2	0	0	2	2	4	−2	0	Consolation

Scores

8:00am CST	UCF	1–2	Stanford	Field 2
Thu, November 17		Report		Stadium: Foley Tourism Complex; Foley, Alabama

1:15pm CST	Stanford	2–0	Delaware	Field 8
Thu, November 17		Report		Stadium: Foley Tourism Complex; Foley, Alabama

6:30pm CST	Delaware	2–1	UCF	Field 3
Thu, November 17		Report		Stadium: Foley Tourism Complex; Foley, Alabama

Group B
Pos	Team	Pld	W	D	L	GF	GA	GD	Pts	Qualification
1	North Carolina	2	2	0	0	3	0	+3	6	Advanced to knockout stage
2	Long Beach State	2	1	0	1	4	2	+2	3	Advanced to knockout stage
3	Colorado	2	0	0	2	0	5	−5	0	Consolation

Scores

8:00am CST	North Carolina	1–0	Colorado	Field 3
Thu, November 17		Report		Stadium: Foley Tourism Complex; Foley, Alabama

1:15pm CST	Colorado	0–4	Long Beach State	Field 9
Thu, November 17		Report		Stadium: Foley Tourism Complex; Foley, Alabama

6:30pm CST	Long Beach State	0–2	North Carolina	Field 2
Thu, November 17		Report		Stadium: Foley Tourism Complex; Foley, Alabama

Group C
Pos	Team	Pld	W	D	L	GF	GA	GD	Pts	Qualification
1	Wisconsin	2	1	1	0	1	0	+1	4	Advanced to knockout stage
2	Texas A&M	2	0	2	0	1	1	0	2	Advanced to knockout stage
3	Florida	2	0	1	1	1	2	−1	1	Consolation

Scores

8:00am CST	Texas A&M	1–1	Florida	Field 8
Thu, November 17		Report		Stadium: Foley Tourism Complex; Foley, Alabama

1:15pm CST	Florida	0–1	Wisconsin	Field 2
Thu, November 17		Report		Stadium: Foley Tourism Complex; Foley, Alabama

6:30pm CST	Wisconsin	0–0	Texas A&M	Field 9
Thu, November 17		Report		Stadium: Foley Tourism Complex; Foley, Alabama

Group D
Pos	Team	Pld	W	D	L	GF	GA	GD	Pts	Qualification
1	Michigan State	2	2	0	0	4	1	+3	6	Advanced to knockout stage
2	Minnesota	2	0	1	1	1	2	−1	1	Advanced to knockout stage
3	Georgia Tech	2	0	1	1	0	2	−2	1	Consolation

Scores

8:00am CST	Michigan State	2–0	Georgia Tech	Field 9
Thu, November 17		Report		Stadium: Foley Tourism Complex; Foley, Alabama

1:15pm CST	Georgia Tech	0–0	Minnesota	Field 3
Thu, November 17		Report		Stadium: Foley Tourism Complex; Foley, Alabama

6:30pm CST	Minnesota	1–2	Michigan State	Field 8
Thu, November 17		Report		Stadium: Foley Tourism Complex; Foley, Alabama

Group E
Pos	Team	Pld	W	D	L	GF	GA	GD	Pts	Qualification
1	Michigan	2	1	1	0	3	1	+2	4	Advanced to knockout stage
2	Colorado Mines	2	0	2	0	2	2	0	2	Advanced to knockout stage
3	UConn	2	0	1	1	1	3	−2	1	Consolation

Scores

9:45am CST	Colorado Mines	1–1	Michigan	Field 2
Thu, November 17		Report		Stadium: Foley Tourism Complex; Foley, Alabama

3:00pm CST	Michigan	2–0	UConn	Field 8
Thu, November 17		Report		Stadium: Foley Tourism Complex; Foley, Alabama

8:15pm CST	UConn	1–1	Colorado Mines	Field 3
Thu, November 17		Report		Stadium: Foley Tourism Complex; Foley, Alabama

Group F
Pos	Team	Pld	W	D	L	GF	GA	GD	Pts	Qualification
1	Cincinnati	2	2	0	0	3	0	+3	6	Advanced to knockout stage
2	Colorado State	2	1	0	1	2	2	0	3	Advanced to knockout stage
3	Tufts	2	0	0	2	0	3	−3	0	Consolation

Scores

9:45am CST	Tufts	0–1	Cincinnati	Field 3
Thu, November 17		Report		Stadium: Foley Tourism Complex; Foley, Alabama

3:00pm CST	Cincinnati	2–0	Colorado State	Field 9
Thu, November 17		Report		Stadium: Foley Tourism Complex; Foley, Alabama

8:15pm CST	Colorado State	2–0	Tufts	Field 2
Thu, November 17		Report		Stadium: Foley Tourism Complex; Foley, Alabama

Group G
Pos	Team	Pld	W	D	L	GF	GA	GD	Pts	Qualification
1	Ohio State	2	2	0	0	6	2	+4	6	Advanced to knockout stage
2	Utah State	2	1	0	1	3	2	+1	3	Advanced to knockout stage
3	North Texas	2	0	0	2	1	6	−5	0	Consolation

Scores

9:45am CST	Ohio State	2–1	Utah State	Field 8
Thu, November 17		Report		Stadium: Foley Tourism Complex; Foley, Alabama

3:00pm CST	Utah State	2–0	North Texas	Field 2
Thu, November 17		Report		Stadium: Foley Tourism Complex; Foley, Alabama

8:15pm CST	North Texas	1–4	Ohio State	Field 9
Thu, November 17		Report		Stadium: Foley Tourism Complex; Foley, Alabama

Group H
Pos	Team	Pld	W	D	L	GF	GA	GD	Pts	Qualification
1	San Diego State	2	2	0	0	3	0	+3	6	Advanced to knockout stage
2	Virginia	2	1	0	1	1	1	0	3	Advanced to knockout stage
3	Saint Louis	2	0	0	2	0	3	−3	0	Consolation

Scores

9:45am CST	San Diego State	2–0	Saint Louis	Field 9
Thu, November 17		Report		Stadium: Foley Tourism Complex; Foley, Alabama

3:00pm CST	Saint Louis	0–1	Virginia	Field 3
Thu, November 17		Report		Stadium: Foley Tourism Complex; Foley, Alabama

8:15pm CST	Virginia	0–1	San Diego State	Field 8
Thu, November 17		Report		Stadium: Foley Tourism Complex; Foley, Alabama

=== Women's championship ===
Group A
Pos	Team	Pld	W	D	L	GF	GA	GD	Pts	Qualification
1	UC-Santa Barbara	2	1	1	0	2	0	+2	4	Advanced to knockout stage
2	Illinois	2	1	1	0	1	0	+1	4	Advanced to knockout stage
3	Florida State	2	0	0	2	0	3	−3	0	Consolation

Scores

8:00am CST	UC-Santa Barbara	2–0	Florida State	Field 4
Thu, November 17		Report		Stadium: Foley Tourism Complex; Foley, Alabama

1:15pm CST	Florida State	0–1	Illinois	Field 10
Thu, November 17		Report		Stadium: Foley Tourism Complex; Foley, Alabama

6:30pm CST	Illinois	0–0	UC-Santa Barbara	Field 5
Thu, November 17		Report		Stadium: Foley Tourism Complex; Foley, Alabama

Group B
Pos	Team	Pld	W	D	L	GF	GA	GD	Pts	Qualification
1	Michigan State	2	2	0	0	5	0	+5	6	Advanced to knockout stage
2	Colorado Mines	2	1	0	1	2	3	−1	3	Advanced to knockout stage
3	Delaware	2	0	0	2	0	4	−4	0	Consolation

Scores

8:00am CST	Michigan State	2–0	Delaware	Field 5
Thu, November 17		Report		Stadium: Foley Tourism Complex; Foley, Alabama

1:15pm CST	Delaware	0–2	Colorado Mines	Field 11
Thu, November 17		Report		Stadium: Foley Tourism Complex; Foley, Alabama

6:30pm CST	Colorado Mines	0–3	Michigan State	Field 4
Thu, November 17		Report		Stadium: Foley Tourism Complex; Foley, Alabama

Group C
Pos	Team	Pld	W	D	L	GF	GA	GD	Pts	Qualification
1	North Carolina	2	2	0	0	6	1	+5	6	Advanced to knockout stage
2	Kansas	2	0	1	1	3	4	−1	1	Advanced to knockout stage
3	Arizona	2	0	1	1	4	8	−4	1	Consolation

Scores

8:00am CST	North Carolina	1–0	Kansas	Field 10
Thu, November 17		Report		Stadium: Foley Tourism Complex; Foley, Alabama

1:15pm CST	Kansas	3–3	Arizona	Field 4
Thu, November 17		Report		Stadium: Foley Tourism Complex; Foley, Alabama

6:30pm CST	Arizona	1–5	North Carolina	Field 11
Thu, November 17		Report		Stadium: Foley Tourism Complex; Foley, Alabama

Group D
Pos	Team	Pld	W	D	L	GF	GA	GD	Pts	Qualification
1	Penn State	2	2	0	0	4	0	+4	6	Advanced to knockout stage
2	Gonzaga	2	0	1	1	1	2	−1	1	Advanced to knockout stage
3	Virginia	2	0	1	1	1	4	−3	1	Consolation

Scores

8:00am CST	Penn State	1–0	Gonzaga	Field 11
Thu, November 17		Report		Stadium: Foley Tourism Complex; Foley, Alabama

1:15pm CST	Gonzaga	1–1	Virginia	Field 5
Thu, November 17		Report		Stadium: Foley Tourism Complex; Foley, Alabama

6:30pm CST	Virginia	0–3	Penn State	Field 10
Thu, November 17		Report		Stadium: Foley Tourism Complex; Foley, Alabama

Group E
Pos	Team	Pld	W	D	L	GF	GA	GD	Pts	Qualification
1	Ohio State	2	2	0	0	4	0	+4	6	Advanced to knockout stage
2	Texas A&M	2	1	0	1	1	2	−1	3	Advanced to knockout stage
3	Florida	2	0	0	2	0	3	−3	0	Consolation

Scores

9:45am CST	Texas A&M	0–2	Ohio State	Field 4
Thu, November 17		Report		Stadium: Foley Tourism Complex; Foley, Alabama

3:00pm CST	Ohio State	2–0	Florida	Field 10
Thu, November 17		Report		Stadium: Foley Tourism Complex; Foley, Alabama

8:15pm CST	Florida	0–1	Texas A&M	Field 5
Thu, November 17		Report		Stadium: Foley Tourism Complex; Foley, Alabama

Group F
Pos	Team	Pld	W	D	L	GF	GA	GD	Pts	Qualification
1	UConn	2	2	0	0	2	0	+2	6	Advanced to knockout stage
2	Miami (OH)	2	1	0	1	3	2	+1	3	Advanced to knockout stage
3	UC San Diego	2	0	0	2	1	4	−3	0	Consolation

Scores

9:45am CST	Miami (OH)	3–1	UC San Diego	Field 5
Thu, November 17		Report		Stadium: Foley Tourism Complex; Foley, Alabama

3:00pm CST	UC San Diego	0–1	UConn	Field 11
Thu, November 17		Report		Stadium: Foley Tourism Complex; Foley, Alabama

8:15pm CST	UConn	1–0	Miami (OH)	Field 4
Thu, November 17		Report		Stadium: Foley Tourism Complex; Foley, Alabama

Group G
Pos	Team	Pld	W	D	L	GF	GA	GD	Pts	Qualification
1	Colorado State	2	1	1	0	3	2	+1	4	Advanced to knockout stage
2	Wisconsin	2	1	0	1	2	2	0	3	Advanced to knockout stage
3	Syracuse	2	0	1	1	1	2	−1	1	Consolation

Scores

9:45am CST	Colorado State	2–1	Wisconsin	Field 10
Thu, November 17		Report		Stadium: Foley Tourism Complex; Foley, Alabama

3:00pm CST	Wisconsin	1–0	Syracuse	Field 4
Thu, November 17		Report		Stadium: Foley Tourism Complex; Foley, Alabama

8:15pm CST	Syracuse	1–1	Colorado State	Field 11
Thu, November 17		Report		Stadium: Foley Tourism Complex; Foley, Alabama

Group H
Pos	Team	Pld	W	D	L	GF	GA	GD	Pts	Qualification
1	Colorado – Gold	2	2	0	0	3	1	+2	6	Advanced to knockout stage
2	Texas	2	0	1	1	1	2	−1	1	Advanced to knockout stage
3	Cal Poly	2	0	1	1	0	1	−1	1	Consolation

Scores

9:45am CST	Texas	0–0	Cal Poly	Field 11
Thu, November 17		Report		Stadium: Foley Tourism Complex; Foley, Alabama

3:00pm CST	Cal Poly	0–1	Colorado – Gold	Field 5
Thu, November 17		Report		Stadium: Foley Tourism Complex; Foley, Alabama

8:15pm CST	Colorado – Gold	2–1	Texas	Field 10
Thu, November 17		Report		Stadium: Foley Tourism Complex; Foley, Alabama

=== Men's open ===
Group A
Pos	Team	Pld	W	D	L	GF	GA	GD	Pts	Qualification
1	JMU	3	2	1	0	12	0	+9 (Note: Actual GD differs because the max GD for any one game is ±5, which came into effect when JMU beat St. Edwards 8–0)	7	Advanced to knockout stage
2	Oregon	3	2	1	0	6	0	+6	7	Advanced to knockout stage
3	Iowa State	3	1	0	2	2	6	−4	3	
4	St. Edward's	3	0	0	3	0	14	−11	0	

Notes:

Scores

8:00am CST	Oregon	4–0	St. Edward's	Field 13
Thu, November 17		Report		Stadium: Foley Tourism Complex; Foley, Alabama

8:00am CST	Iowa State	0–4	JMU	Field 14
Thu, November 17		Report		Stadium: Foley Tourism Complex; Foley, Alabama

3:00pm CST	JMU	0–0	Oregon	Field 15
Thu, November 17		Report		Stadium: Foley Tourism Complex; Foley, Alabama

3:00pm CST	St. Edward's	0–2	Iowa State	Field 16
Thu, November 17		Report		Stadium: Foley Tourism Complex; Foley, Alabama

8:00am CST	Oregon	2–0	Iowa State	Field 6
Fri, November 18		Report		Stadium: Foley Tourism Complex; Foley, Alabama

8:00am CST	JMU	8–0	St. Edward's	Field 7
Fri, November 18		Report		Stadium: Foley Tourism Complex; Foley, Alabama

Group B
Pos	Team	Pld	W	D	L	GF	GA	GD	Pts	Qualification
1	Penn State	3	2	0	1	3	4	−1	6 (Note: Tiebreaker: Penn State beat Houston CC 1–0)	Advanced to knockout stage
2	Houston CC	3	2	0	1	9	3	+5 (Note: Actual GD differs because the max GD for any one game is ±5, which came into effect when Houston CC beat Miami (FL) 6–0)	6	
3	Illinois	3	1	1	1	7	5	+2	4	
4	Miami (FL)	3	0	1	2	3	10	−6	1	

Notes:

Scores

8:00am CST	Penn State	1–0	Houston CC	Field 15
Thu, November 17		Report		Stadium: Foley Tourism Complex; Foley, Alabama

8:00am CST	Illinois	2–2	Miami (FL)	Field 16
Thu, November 17		Report		Stadium: Foley Tourism Complex; Foley, Alabama

3:00pm CST	Miami (FL)	1–2	Penn State	Field 6
Thu, November 17		Report		Stadium: Foley Tourism Complex; Foley, Alabama

3:00pm CST	Houston CC	3–2	Illinois	Field 7
Thu, November 17		Report		Stadium: Foley Tourism Complex; Foley, Alabama

8:00am CST	Penn State	0–3	Illinois	Field 13
Fri, November 18		Report		Stadium: Foley Tourism Complex; Foley, Alabama

8:00am CST	Miami (FL)	0–6	Houston CC	Field 14
Fri, November 18		Report		Stadium: Foley Tourism Complex; Foley, Alabama

Group C
Pos	Team	Pld	W	D	L	GF	GA	GD	Pts	Qualification
1	Purdue	3	2	1	0	7	1	+6	7	Advanced to knockout stage
2	Cal Poly	3	2	1	0	4	2	+2	7	Advanced to knockout stage
3	Towson	3	1	0	2	3	6	−3	3	
4	LSU	3	0	0	3	1	6	−5	0	

Scores

8:00am CST	Purdue	3–0	Towson	Field 6
Thu, November 17		Report		Stadium: Foley Tourism Complex; Foley, Alabama

8:00am CST	LSU	0–1	Cal Poly	Field 7
Thu, November 17		Report		Stadium: Foley Tourism Complex; Foley, Alabama

3:00pm CST	Cal Poly	1–1	Purdue	Field 13
Thu, November 17		Report		Stadium: Foley Tourism Complex; Foley, Alabama

3:00pm CST	Towson	2–1	LSU	Field 14
Thu, November 17		Report		Stadium: Foley Tourism Complex; Foley, Alabama

8:00am CST	Purdue	3–0	LSU	Field 15
Fri, November 18		Report		Stadium: Foley Tourism Complex; Foley, Alabama

8:00am CST	Cal Poly	2–1	Towson	Field 16
Fri, November 18		Report		Stadium: Foley Tourism Complex; Foley, Alabama

Group D
Pos	Team	Pld	W	D	L	GF	GA	GD	Pts	Qualification
1	East Carolina	3	2	0	1	6	3	+3	6	Advanced to knockout stage
2	Miami (OH)	3	1	2	0	5	3	+2	5	
3	Boston College	3	1	1	1	4	5	−1	4	
4	Cal State Fullerton	3	0	1	2	2	6	−4	1	

Scores

9:45am CST	Cal State Fullerton	0–2	East Carolina	Field 13
Thu, November 17		Report		Stadium: Foley Tourism Complex; Foley, Alabama

9:45am CST	Boston College	1–1	Miami (OH)	Field 14
Thu, November 17		Report		Stadium: Foley Tourism Complex; Foley, Alabama

4:45pm CST	Miami (OH)	1–1	Cal State Fullerton	Field 15
Thu, November 17		Report		Stadium: Foley Tourism Complex; Foley, Alabama

4:45pm CST	East Carolina	3–0	Boston College	Field 16
Thu, November 17		Report		Stadium: Foley Tourism Complex; Foley, Alabama

10:00am CST	Cal State Fullerton	1–3	Boston College	Field 6
Fri, November 18		Report		Stadium: Foley Tourism Complex; Foley, Alabama

10:00am CST	Miami (OH)	3–1	East Carolina	Field 7
Fri, November 18		Report		Stadium: Foley Tourism Complex; Foley, Alabama

Group E
Pos	Team	Pld	W	D	L	GF	GA	GD	Pts	Qualification
1	Utah Valley	3	3	0	0	14	0	+11 (Note: Actual GD differs because the max GD for any one game is ±5, which came into effect when Utah Valley beat Colorado Springs 8–0)	9	Advanced to knockout stage
2	SUNY Cortland	3	2	0	1	4	6	−2	6	
3	Texas	3	1	0	2	3	4	−1	3	
4	Colorado Springs	3	0	0	3	1	12	−8	0	

Notes:

Scores

9:45am CST	Utah Valley	4–0	SUNY Cortland	Field 15
Thu, November 17		Report		Stadium: Foley Tourism Complex; Foley, Alabama

9:45am CST	Texas	2–0	Colorado Springs	Field 16
Thu, November 17		Report		Stadium: Foley Tourism Complex; Foley, Alabama

4:45pm CST	Colorado Springs	0–8	Utah Valley	Field 6
Thu, November 17		Report		Stadium: Foley Tourism Complex; Foley, Alabama

4:45pm CST	SUNY Cortland	2–1	Texas	Field 7
Thu, November 17		Report		Stadium: Foley Tourism Complex; Foley, Alabama

10:00am CST	Utah Valley	2–0	Texas	Field 13
Fri, November 18		Report		Stadium: Foley Tourism Complex; Foley, Alabama

10:00am CST	Colorado Springs	1–2	SUNY Cortland	Field 14
Fri, November 18		Report		Stadium: Foley Tourism Complex; Foley, Alabama

Group F
Pos	Team	Pld	W	D	L	GF	GA	GD	Pts	Qualification
1	UCLA	3	3	0	0	9	2	+7	9	Advanced to knockout stage
2	Arkansas	3	1	1	1	3	4	−1	4	
3	George Mason	3	1	1	1	5	7	−2	4	
4	Georgia College	3	0	0	3	4	8	−4	0	

Scores

9:45am CST	UCLA	3–1	Georgia College	Field 6
Thu, November 17		Report		Stadium: Foley Tourism Complex; Foley, Alabama

9:45am CST	Arkansas	1–1	George Mason	Field 7
Thu, November 17		Report		Stadium: Foley Tourism Complex; Foley, Alabama

4:45pm CST	George Mason	0–3	UCLA	Field 13
Thu, November 17		Report		Stadium: Foley Tourism Complex; Foley, Alabama

4:45pm CST	Georgia College	0–1	Arkansas	Field 14
Thu, November 17		Report		Stadium: Foley Tourism Complex; Foley, Alabama

10:00am CST	UCLA	3–1	Arkansas	Field 15
Fri, November 18		Report		Stadium: Foley Tourism Complex; Foley, Alabama

10:00am CST	George Mason	4–3	Georgia College	Field 16
Fri, November 18		Report		Stadium: Foley Tourism Complex; Foley, Alabama

=== Women's open ===
Group A
Pos	Team	Pld	W	D	L	GF	GA	GD	Pts	Qualification
1	UCLA	3	3	0	0	12	1	+11	9	Advanced to knockout stage
2	Iowa	3	2	0	1	6	7	−1	6	
3	George Mason	3	1	0	2	3	7	−4	3	
4	Missouri	3	0	0	3	3	9	−6	0	

Scores

11:30am CST	UCLA	4–0	George Mason	Field 13
Thu, November 17		Report		Stadium: Foley Tourism Complex; Foley, Alabama

11:30am CST	Missouri	2–3	Iowa	Field 14
Thu, November 17		Report		Stadium: Foley Tourism Complex; Foley, Alabama

6:30pm CST	Iowa	1–4	UCLA	Field 15
Thu, November 17		Report		Stadium: Foley Tourism Complex; Foley, Alabama

6:30pm CST	George Mason	2–1	Missouri	Field 16
Thu, November 17		Report		Stadium: Foley Tourism Complex; Foley, Alabama

12:00pm CST	UCLA	4–0	Missouri	Field 6
Fri, November 18		Report		Stadium: Foley Tourism Complex; Foley, Alabama

12:00pm CST	Iowa	2–1	George Mason	Field 7
Fri, November 18		Report		Stadium: Foley Tourism Complex; Foley, Alabama

Group B
Pos	Team	Pld	W	D	L	GF	GA	GD	Pts	Qualification
1	Virginia Tech	3	1	0	0	12	1	+7 (Note: Actual GD differs because the max GD for any one game is ±5, which came into effect when Virginia Tech beat Denver 10–0)	9	Advanced to knockout stage
2	Cornell	3	1	0	1	7	2	+5 (Note: Actual GD differs because the max GD for any one game is ±5, which came into effect when Cornell beat Denver 6–0)	6	Advanced to knockout stage
3	Denver	3	0	0	2	0	16	−9	3	
4	No team, all teams awarded 3 points and +1 goal difference									

Notes:

Scores

11:30am CST	Cornell	6–0	Denver	Field 16
Thu, November 17		Report		Stadium: Foley Tourism Complex; Foley, Alabama

6:30pm CST	Denver	0–10	Virginia Tech	Field 6
Thu, November 17		Report		Stadium: Foley Tourism Complex; Foley, Alabama

12:00pm CST	Virginia Tech	2–1	Cornell	Field 13
Fri, November 18		Report		Stadium: Foley Tourism Complex; Foley, Alabama

Group C
Pos	Team	Pld	W	D	L	GF	GA	GD	Pts	Qualification
1	Ohio	3	2	1	0	4	2	+2	7	Advanced to knockout stage
2	Georgia Tech	3	2	0	1	5	1	+4	6	
3	Vermont	3	1	0	2	4	5	−1	3	
4	Colorado "Black"	3	0	1	2	2	7	−5	1	

Scores

11:30am CST	Colorado "Black"	1–1	Ohio	Field 6
Thu, November 17		Report		Stadium: Foley Tourism Complex; Foley, Alabama

11:30am CST	Vermont	0–2	Georgia Tech	Field 7
Thu, November 17		Report		Stadium: Foley Tourism Complex; Foley, Alabama

6:30pm CST	Georgia Tech	3–0	Colorado "Black"	Field 13
Thu, November 17		Report		Stadium: Foley Tourism Complex; Foley, Alabama

6:30pm CST	Ohio	2–1	Vermont	Field 14
Thu, November 17		Report		Stadium: Foley Tourism Complex; Foley, Alabama

12:00pm CST	Colorado "Black"	1–3	Vermont	Field 15
Fri, November 18		Report		Stadium: Foley Tourism Complex; Foley, Alabama

12:00pm CST	Georgia Tech	0–1	Ohio	Field 16
Fri, November 18		Report		Stadium: Foley Tourism Complex; Foley, Alabama

Group D
Pos	Team	Pld	W	D	L	GF	GA	GD	Pts	Qualification
1	San Diego State	3	2	1	0	3	0	+3	7	Advanced to knockout stage
2	Boston College	3	2	0	1	2	2	0	6	
3	Air Force	3	1	1	1	5	1	+4	4	
4	Miami (FL)	3	0	0	3	0	7	−7	0	

Scores

1:15pm CST	Boston College	1–0	Air Force	Field 13
Thu, November 17		Report		Stadium: Foley Tourism Complex; Foley, Alabama

1:15pm CST	San Diego State	1–0	Miami (FL)	Field 14
Thu, November 17		Report		Stadium: Foley Tourism Complex; Foley, Alabama

8:15pm CST	Miami (FL)	0–1	Boston College	Field 15
Thu, November 17		Report		Stadium: Foley Tourism Complex; Foley, Alabama

8:15pm CST	Air Force	0–0	San Diego State	Field 16
Thu, November 17		Report		Stadium: Foley Tourism Complex; Foley, Alabama

2:00pm CST	Boston College	0–2	San Diego State	Field 6
Fri, November 18		Report		Stadium: Foley Tourism Complex; Foley, Alabama

2:00pm CST	Miami (FL)	0–5	Air Force	Field 7
Fri, November 18		Report		Stadium: Foley Tourism Complex; Foley, Alabama

Group E
Pos	Team	Pld	W	D	L	GF	GA	GD	Pts	Qualification
1	Oregon	3	3	0	0	9	1	+8	9	Advanced to knockout stage
2	JMU	3	2	0	1	7	2	+5	6	Advanced to knockout stage
3	West Virginia	3	0	1	2	0	4	−4	1	
4	Northern Iowa	3	0	1	2	0	9	−9	1	

Scores

1:15pm CST	JMU	4–0	Northern Iowa	Field 15
Thu, November 17		Report		Stadium: Foley Tourism Complex; Foley, Alabama

1:15pm CST	Oregon	2–0	West Virginia	Field 16
Thu, November 17		Report		Stadium: Foley Tourism Complex; Foley, Alabama

8:15pm CST	West Virginia	0–2	JMU	Field 6
Thu, November 17		Report		Stadium: Foley Tourism Complex; Foley, Alabama

8:15pm CST	Northern Iowa	0–5	Oregon	Field 7
Thu, November 17		Report		Stadium: Foley Tourism Complex; Foley, Alabama

2:00pm CST	JMU	1–2	Oregon	Field 13
Fri, November 18		Report		Stadium: Foley Tourism Complex; Foley, Alabama

2:00pm CST	West Virginia	0–0	Northern Iowa	Field 14
Fri, November 18		Report		Stadium: Foley Tourism Complex; Foley, Alabama

Group F
Pos	Team	Pld	W	D	L	GF	GA	GD	Pts	Qualification
1	Southern Cal (USC)	3	3	0	0	14	2	+12	9	Advanced to knockout stage
2	UCF	3	2	0	1	6	5	+1	6	
3	Iowa State	3	1	0	2	5	10	−5	3	
4	Penn	3	0	0	3	2	10	−8	0	

Scores

1:15pm CST	USC	4–0	UCF	Field 6
Thu, November 17		Report		Stadium: Foley Tourism Complex; Foley, Alabama

1:15pm CST	Penn	1–3	Iowa State	Field 7
Thu, November 17		Report		Stadium: Foley Tourism Complex; Foley, Alabama

8:15pm CST	Iowa State	2–6	USC	Field 13
Thu, November 17		Report		Stadium: Foley Tourism Complex; Foley, Alabama

8:15pm CST	UCF	3–1	Penn	Field 14
Thu, November 17		Report		Stadium: Foley Tourism Complex; Foley, Alabama

2:00pm CST	USC	4–0	Penn	Field 15
Fri, November 18		Report		Stadium: Foley Tourism Complex; Foley, Alabama

2:00pm CST	Iowa State	0–3	UCF	Field 16
Fri, November 18		Report		Stadium: Foley Tourism Complex; Foley, Alabama

== Tournament bracket ==
=== Men's championship ===
First round
Fri • 10:00AM • Field 2
Stanford (a.e.t.)	3
Minnesota	2
Fri • 10:00AM • Field 3
San Diego State	3
Colorado Mines	0
Fri • 10:00AM • Field 8
Ohio State	2
Colorado State	1
Fri • 10:00AM • Field 9
North Carolina	1
Texas A&M	2
Fri • 12:00PM • Field 2
Wisconsin	1
Long Beach State	0
Fri • 12:00PM • Field 3
Cincinnati	2
Utah State	0
Fri • 12:00PM • Field 8
Michigan	0
Virginia	1
Fri • 12:00PM • Field 9
Michigan State	0
Delaware	1

Quarterfinals
Fri • 4:00PM • Field 8
Stanford	1
San Diego State	2
Fri • 4:00PM • Field 9
Ohio State	3
Texas A&M	0
Fri • 6:00PM • Field 8
Wisconsin	0
Cincinnati	2
Fri • 6:00PM • Field 9
Virginia	1
Delaware	0

Semifinals
Sat • 10:00AM • Field 4
San Diego State	1
Ohio State (a.e.t.)	2
Sat • 10:00AM • Field 5
Cincinnati	0
Virginia	1

Final
Sat • 3:00PM • Field 1
Ohio State	2
Virginia	3

==== Men's consolation ====
Quarterfinals
Fri • 4:00PM • Field 13
UCF (a.e.t.)	2
UConn	1
Fri • 4:00PM • Field 14
Tufts	0
Colorado	3
Fri • 6:00PM • Field 13
~~Florida (forfeit)~~
North Texas
Fri • 6:00PM • Field 14
Saint Louis	2
Georgia Tech	3

Semifinals
Sat • 8:00AM • Field 13
UCF	2 (6)
Colorado (pen.)	2 (7)
Sat • 8:00AM • Field 14
North Texas	0
Georgia Tech	2

Final
Sat • 1:00PM • Field 8
Colorado	0
Georgia Tech	3

=== Women's championship ===
First round
Fri • 10:00AM • Field 4
UC-Santa Barbara	1
Gonzaga	0
Fri • 10:00AM • Field 5
Colorado	1 (2)
Texas A&M (pen.)	1 (3)
Fri • 10:00AM • Field 10
Colorado State	2
Miami (OH)	1
Fri • 10:00AM • Field 11
Michigan State	2
Kansas	0
Fri • 12:00PM • Field 4
North Carolina	2
Colorado Mines	0
Fri • 12:00PM • Field 5
UConn	2
Wisconsin	1
Fri • 12:00PM • Field 10
Ohio State	1
Texas	0
Fri • 12:00PM • Field 11
Penn State	5
Illinois	0

Quarterfinals
Fri • 4:00PM • Field 2
UC-Santa Barbara	2
Texas A&M	0
Fri • 4:00PM • Field 3
Colorado State	0
Michigan State (a.e.t.)	1
Fri • 6:00PM • Field 2
North Carolina	3
UConn	0
Fri • 6:00PM • Field 3
Ohio State (pen.)	1 (3)
Penn State	1 (2)

Semifinals
Sat • 10:00AM • Field 10
UC-Santa Barbara (pen.)	0 (4)
Michigan State	0 (2)
Sat • 10:00AM • Field 11
North Carolina	2
Ohio State	1

Final
Sat • 5:00PM • Field 1
UC-Santa Barbara	1
North Carolina	0

==== Women's consolation ====
Quarterfinals
Fri • 4:00PM • Field 15
Florida State	1
Florida	6
Fri • 4:00PM • Field 16
UC San Diego	0
Delaware	1
Fri • 6:00PM • Field 15
Arizona	0
Syracuse	1
Fri • 6:00PM • Field 16
Cal Poly (pen.)	0 (5)
Virginia	0 (3)

Semifinals
Sat • 8:00AM • Field 15
Florida	2
Delaware	0
Sat • 8:00AM • Field 16
Syracuse	0
Cal Poly	2

Final
Sat • 1:00PM • Field 9
Florida	0 (3)
Cal Poly (pen.)	0 (5)

=== Men's open ===
Quarterfinals
Fri • 4:00PM • Field 4
Purdue	1
East Carolina	0
Fri • 4:00PM • Field 6
Utah Valley	0
Oregon	5
Fri • 4:00PM • Field 10
James Madison	0
Penn State	1
Fri • 4:00PM • Field 11
UCLA	1
Cal Poly	0

Semifinals
Sat • 8:00AM • Field 4
Purdue	0
Oregon	1
Sat • 8:00AM • Field 5
Penn State	2
UCLA	0

Final
Sat • 1:00PM • Field 3
Oregon	1
Penn State	2

=== Women's open ===
Quarterfinals
Fri • 8:00PM • Field 4
Oregon (a.e.t.)	2
San Diego State	1
Fri • 8:00PM • Field 6
USC	3
Cornell	0
Fri • 8:00PM • Field 10
Virginia Tech	3
Ohio	0
Fri • 8:00PM • Field 11
UCLA (pen.)	0 (2)
JMU	0 (1)

Semifinals
Sat • 8:00AM • Field 10
Oregon	2
USC	1
Sat • 8:00AM • Field 11
Virginia Tech (pen.)	1 (5)
UCLA	1 (4)

Final
Sat • 1:00PM • Field #2
Oregon	1
Virginia Tech	2
