= 2004 NIRSA National Soccer Championship =

11th edition of the competition

- League: NIRSA
- Sport: Soccer
- Site: Initial Tournament Whitaker Fields at University of Texas in Austin, Texas Continuations Men's championship: Red Mountain Soccer Complex; Mesa, Arizona; Remaining divisions: Cancelled
- Duration: Initial Tournament November 18–20, 2004 Continuations Men's championship: January 8, 2005; Remaining divisions: Cancelled
- Number of teams: 24 (Men's championship); 16 (Women's championship); 20 (Men's open); 20 (Women's open)
- Results: Official Results

Men's Championship Division
- Champion: Texas A&M (6 points) (1st title, 1st title game)
- Runners-up: Colorado State (3 points) (1st title game)
- Third place: UC-Berkeley (0 points) (1st title game)
- Fourth place: North Carolina (Did not attend)
- Season MVP: Bill Besancon (Texas A&M)

Women's Championship Division
- Semifinalists (All declared joint winners): Colorado (4th title, 5th title game); Michigan (3rd title, 4th title game); Colorado State(3rd title, 3rd title game); UC-Santa Barbara (1st title, 2nd title game)

Men's Open Division
- Semifinalists (None declared winners): Iowa State, Virginia, Penn State, LMU

Women's Open Division
- Cancelled

NIRSA national soccer championships seasons
- ← 2003 2005 →

The 2004 NIRSA national soccer championship, also referred to as the NIRSA Collegiate Soccer Sport Club championship, was the 11th NIRSA National Soccer Championships, the annual national championships for United States-based, collegiate club soccer teams organized by NIRSA. It took place at the Whitaker Fields at the University of Texas in Austin, Texas from Thursday, November 18 to Saturday, November 20, 2004. The tournament would get rained out before a champion could be crowned in any division. The only division to have a continuation to the tournament was the men's championship division which took place at the Red Mountain Soccer Complex in Mesa, Arizona on January 8, 2005.

== Overview ==
Heavy rains in Austin, Texas on the preceding Monday and Tuesday resulted in the tournament staff postponing the tournament from the initial start date of Thursday to Friday to allow the fields more time to dry. However, the tournament would not be extended, meaning the games would be shortened from 40 minute halves to 25 minute halves. Despite best efforts, at approximately noon on Saturday, a thunderstorm passed through which not only further flooded the already wet fields but also created a safety hazard with the lightning. Ultimately, the initial tournament would get cancelled, marking the first time this has ever occurred in the NIRSA national championships.

=== Prior to the cancellation ===
In the men's championship division, by the quarterfinals, no teams remaining had previously made the finals while the men's open division had no previous champions. Meanwhile, the women's championship division only had one team remaining who had not previously won at least 2 titles, UC-Santa Barbara, who had only ever made the finals once, in 2001, where they lost to Penn State who in this tournament, was eliminated in the group stage following a 3-way tie on points and a 2-way tie on goal difference. Despite this, UC-Santa Barbara would eventually go on to become the winningest team in the women's championship division. The women's open championship was the only division to not finish at least the quarterfinals, the remaining teams were LSU, Illinois, Texas, UC-Davis, Colorado "Black", Northern Colorado, Virginia Tech, and UCLA.

=== Continuation ===
Following the cancellation, each division was able to decide how to move forward. Both open divisions and the men's championship consolation bracket elected to not declare a winner while the women's championship decided to elect all four remaining teams as co-champions. The only division who was able to organize a continuation tournament was the men's championship division who had three of the four remaining teams agree to a tournament in Mesa, Arizona on January 8, 2005. Despite choosing Arizona as the host site to mitigate the risk of rain, Mesa would receive, what was described as, "their total annual rainfall for 2005" in the week preceding the tournament, flooding the fields. Luckily, the fields would dry in time for the tournament to go on as scheduled.

Since North Carolina elected not to participate, the teams decided that a round-robin would be the best solution to finishing the tournament. Each team would play each other once with each game requiring a winner and the team with the best record would be crowned champion. The remaining teams were Texas A&M, Colorado State, and UC-Berkeley, none of which had ever made the finals.

In the opening match, Colorado State would defeat UC-Berkeley 2–0. The following match, Texas A&M would beat Colorado State 1–0, meaning if Texas A&M won their final match they'd be champions but if they lost a three-way penalty shootout would ensue to determine the champion. Texas A&M would go on to win their final match 2–0 and be crowned national champions for the first time. This result also meant Colorado State would finish 2nd and UC-Berkeley finishing 3rd. Following the tournament, Bill Besançon would be named men's championship MVP.

== Format ==
The competition consisted of 80 teams: 40 championship teams and 40 open teams. The divisions were further divided into a men's and women's division: 24 men's and 16 women's teams in the championship division as well as 20 men's and 20 women's teams in the open division. The divisions were then further divided into groups: eight groups of three teams in the men's championship, four groups of four teams each in the women's championship division, and five groups of four teams each in the men's and women's open divisions.

All four divisions engaged in a round-robin tournament that determined teams able to advance to a knockout stage. Each team played every other team in their group once in pool play which consisted of two 40-minute halves separated by a seven-minute halftime and utilized the three points for a win system. After pool play, the two highest ranked teams from each group in the men's and women's championship divisions advanced to their respective knockout stage, with the third placed team in the men's championship advancing to a consolation bracket. The top ranked team in the men's and women's open divisions advanced to their respective knockout stage in addition to the next three highest ranked wild card teams (a max of two teams per group could advance)

Tie-breaking criteria for group play
The ranking of teams in each group was based on the following criteria in order:
1. Highest number of points
2. Winner of head-to-head competition
3. Greatest goal difference
4. Most goals scored

In a tie breaking scenario involving more than 2 teams, the tiebreaker procedure would begin. If one team is identified as different and both remaining teams are still tied, the tie breaker procedure is restarted.

If a tie still remained after the first 4 criteria, the following was used to break a tie:

1. NCAA kicks from the mark
  - If there was a three-way tie, a coin-flip would be conducted. The two teams that chose the same outcome would compete in kicks from the mark between each other. The winner would compete with the last remaining team in kicks from the mark
  - If there's a four-way tie, a drawing of lots would be conducted (only could occur in open division)

Knockout stage games also consisted of two 40-minute halves with the round of 16 and quarterfinals separated by a seven-minute halftime and the semifinals and finals had a ten-minute halftime. Knockout stage games needed to declare a winner, therefore if a game was tied at the end of regulation in the round of sixteen or quarterfinals, no more than two five-minute sudden victory overtime periods would be played, while in the semifinals and finals, no more than two ten-minute sudden victory overtime periods would be played. Teams would change ends after the conclusion of the first overtime period. If still tied after overtime, kicks from the mark would determine the winner.

== Qualification and selections ==
Each of the six regions were able to hand out three automatic bids for the men's championship division and two automatic bids for the women's championship division. The final 6 bids for the men's championship division and final 4 bids for the women's championship were given out by NIRSA to teams, typically based on their regional tournament results and RPI.

The remaining teams participated in the open division, chosen on a first-come first-serve basis via online registration beginning on September 1, 2004. Initially, it was stated that there would be a max of 16 teams per gender division but 20 teams per division would be allowed to participate.

=== Men's championship ===
Participating teams
Region	Team	Appearance	Last Bid
I	Cornell	5th	2003
I	Navy	5th	2003
I	Delaware	3rd	2003
I	Penn	1st	Never
II	North Carolina	4th	2001
II	Florida	2nd	1998
II	Georgia Tech	2nd	2000
II	Vanderbilt	2nd	2002
III	Miami (OH)	5th	2001
III	Michigan State	2nd	2003
III	Dayton	1st	Never
III	Western Michigan	1st	Never
IV	Texas	10th	2003
IV	Kansas	5th	2003
IV	Texas A&M	5th	2003
IV	Oklahoma	2nd	1994
V	Colorado State	10th	2003
V	Colorado	6th	2003
V	Minnesota	4th	2003
VI	Weber State	6th	2003
VI	Arizona	5th	2003
VI	Utah Valley State	3rd	2003
VI	UC Berkeley	2nd	2003
VI	UC Santa Barabara	2nd	2001

=== Women's championship ===
Participating teams
Region	Team	Appearance	Last Bid
I	Penn State	11th	2003
I	Delaware	4th	2001
I	Princeton	2nd	2002
II	JMU	8th	2003
II	Florida	5th	2003
II	Virginia	2nd	2003
III	Miami (OH)	11th	2003
III	Michigan	6th	2003
III	Michigan State	3rd	2002
III	Indiana	2nd	2000
IV	Texas A&M	7th	2003
IV	Baylor	5th	2003
V	Colorado	11th	2003
V	Colorado State	8th	2003
VI	UC-Santa Barbara	5th	2003
VI	UC-Berkeley	1st	Never

=== Men's open ===
Region	Num	Team
I	1	Penn State
II	5	UCF, Duke, Florida State, JMU, Virginia
III	1	Southern Illinois
IV	3	Texas A&M "B", Texas Southern, Texas State
V	4	Colorado "Black", Iowa State, Nebraska, North Dakota State
VI	6	Arizona State, Central Washington, Long Beach State, Loyola Marymount, Snow College, UTEP

=== Women's open ===
Region	Num	Team
I	3	Cornell, Vermont, Yale
II	4	NC State, Richmond, Vanderbilt, Virginia Tech
III	3	Illinois, Ohio State, Western Michigan
IV	2	LSU, Texas
V	6	Colorado "Black", Colorado School of the Mines, Colorado State "Green", Iowa State, Kansas, Northern Colorado
VI	2	UC-Davis, UCLA

== Group stage ==
=== Men's championship ===
Group A
Pos	Team	Pld	W	D	L	GF	GA	GD	Pts	Qualification
1	UC-Santa Barbara	2	1	1	0	2	1	+1	4	Advanced to knockout stage
2	Navy	2	0	2	0	4	4	0	2	Advanced to knockout stage
3	Western Michigan	2	0	1	1	3	4	−1	1	Consolation

Scores

8:00am CST	UC-Santa Barbara	1–1	Navy	Field 1
Fri, November 19		Report		Stadium: University of Texas; Austin, Texas

12:00pm CST	Navy	3–3	Western Michigan	Field 1
Fri, November 19		Report		Stadium: University of Texas; Austin, Texas

4:00pm CST	Western Michigan	0–1	UC-Santa Barbara	Field 1
Fri, November 19		Report		Stadium: University of Texas; Austin, Texas

Group B
Pos	Team	Pld	W	D	L	GF	GA	GD	Pts	Qualification
1	Texas A&M	2	2	0	0	6	1	+5	6	Advanced to knockout stage
2	Colorado	2	1	0	1	2	1	+1	3	Advanced to knockout stage
3	Florida	2	0	0	2	1	7	−6	0	Consolation

Scores

8:00am CST	Texas A&M	5–1	Florida	Field 2
Fri, November 19		Report		Stadium: University of Texas; Austin, Texas

12:00pm CST	Florida	0–2	Colorado	Field 2
Fri, November 19		Report		Stadium: University of Texas; Austin, Texas

4:00pm CST	Colorado	0–1	Texas A&M	Field 2
Fri, November 19		Report		Stadium: University of Texas; Austin, Texas

Group C
Pos	Team	Pld	W	D	L	GF	GA	GD	Pts	Qualification
1	Weber State	2	1	1	0	1	0	+1	4	Advanced to knockout stage
2	Georgia Tech	2	0	2	0	2	2	0	2	Advanced to knockout stage
3	Dayton	2	0	1	1	2	3	−1	1	Consolation

Scores

8:00am CST	Weber State	1–0	Dayton	Field 6
Fri, November 19		Report		Stadium: University of Texas; Austin, Texas

12:00pm CST	Dayton	2–2	Georgia Tech	Field 6
Fri, November 19		Report		Stadium: University of Texas; Austin, Texas

4:00pm CST	Georgia Tech	0–0	Weber State	Field 6
Fri, November 19		Report		Stadium: University of Texas; Austin, Texas

Group D
Pos	Team	Pld	W	D	L	GF	GA	GD	Pts	Qualification
1	Minnesota	2	1	1	0	4	2	+2	4	Advanced to knockout stage
2	Vanderbilt	2	1	1	0	3	2	+1	4	Advanced to knockout stage
3	Oklahoma	2	0	0	2	2	5	−3	0	Consolation

Scores

8:00am CST	Vanderbilt	2–1	Oklahoma	Field 10
Fri, November 19		Report		Stadium: University of Texas; Austin, Texas

12:00pm CST	Oklahoma	1–3	Minnesota	Field 10
Fri, November 19		Report		Stadium: University of Texas; Austin, Texas

4:00pm CST	Minnesota	1–1	Vanderbilt	Field 10
Fri, November 19		Report		Stadium: University of Texas; Austin, Texas

Group E
Pos	Team	Pld	W	D	L	GF	GA	GD	Pts	Qualification
1	Texas	2	1	1	0	1	0	+1	4	Advanced to knockout stage
2	Cornell	2	1	1	0	1	0	+1	4	Advanced to knockout stage
3	Arizona	2	0	0	2	0	2	−2	0	Consolation

Scores

9:00am CST	Arizona	0–1	Texas	Field 1
Fri, November 19		Report		Stadium: University of Texas; Austin, Texas

1:00pm CST	Texas	0–0	Cornell	Field 1
Fri, November 19		Report		Stadium: University of Texas; Austin, Texas

5:00pm CST	Cornell	1–0	Arizona	Field 1
Fri, November 19		Report		Stadium: University of Texas; Austin, Texas

Group F
Pos	Team	Pld	W	D	L	GF	GA	GD	Pts	Qualification
1	North Carolina	2	2	0	0	8	1	+7	6	Advanced to knockout stage
2	Michigan State	2	0	1	1	2	4	−2	1	Advanced to knockout stage
3	Delaware	2	0	1	1	1	6	−5	1	Consolation

Scores

9:00am CST	Michigan State	1–1	Delaware	Field 2
Fri, November 19		Report		Stadium: University of Texas; Austin, Texas

1:00pm CST	Delaware	0–5	North Carolina	Field 2
Fri, November 19		Report		Stadium: University of Texas; Austin, Texas

5:00pm CST	North Carolina	3–1	Michigan State	Field 2
Fri, November 19		Report		Stadium: University of Texas; Austin, Texas

Group G
Pos	Team	Pld	W	D	L	GF	GA	GD	Pts	Qualification
1	Penn	2	1	1	0	3	1	+2	4	Advanced to knockout stage
2	Kansas	2	0	2	0	1	1	0	2	Advanced to knockout stage
3	Utah Valley State	2	0	1	1	0	2	−2	1	Consolation

Scores

9:00am CST	Penn	1–1	Kansas	Field 6
Fri, November 19		Report		Stadium: University of Texas; Austin, Texas

1:00pm CST	Kansas	0–0	Utah Valley State	Field 6
Fri, November 19		Report		Stadium: University of Texas; Austin, Texas

5:00pm CST	Utah Valley State	0–2	Penn	Field 6
Fri, November 19		Report		Stadium: University of Texas; Austin, Texas

Group H
Pos	Team	Pld	W	D	L	GF	GA	GD	Pts	Qualification
1	Colorado State	2	1	1	0	2	1	+1	4	Advanced to knockout stage
2	UC-Berkeley	2	0	2	0	0	0	0	2	Advanced to knockout stage
3	Miami (OH)	2	0	1	1	1	2	−1	1	Consolation

Scores

9:00am CST	Colorado State	0–0	UC-Berkeley	Field 10
Fri, November 19		Report		Stadium: University of Texas; Austin, Texas

1:00pm CST	UC-Berkeley	0–0	Miami (OH)	Field 10
Fri, November 19		Report		Stadium: University of Texas; Austin, Texas

5:00pm CST	Miami (OH)	1–2	Colorado State	Field 10
Fri, November 19		Report		Stadium: University of Texas; Austin, Texas

=== Women's championship ===
Group A
Pos	Team	Pld	W	D	L	GF	GA	GD	Pts	Qualification
1	Michigan	3	1	2	0	3	1	+2	5	Advanced to knockout stage
2	Florida	3	1	2	0	4	3	+1	5	Advanced to knockout stage
3	Penn State	3	1	2	0	2	1	+1	5	
4	Texas A&M	3	0	0	3	3	7	−4	0	

Scores

10:00am CST	Michigan	0–0	Florida	Field 1
Fri, November 19		Report		Stadium: University of Texas; Austin, Texas

10:00am CST	Texas A&M	0–1	Penn State	Field 2
Fri, November 19		Report		Stadium: University of Texas; Austin, Texas

2:00pm CST	Penn State	0–0	Michigan	Field 1
Fri, November 19		Report		Stadium: University of Texas; Austin, Texas

2:00pm CST	Florida	3–2	Texas A&M	Field 2
Fri, November 19		Report		Stadium: University of Texas; Austin, Texas

6:00pm CST	Michigan	3–1	Texas A&M	Field 1
Fri, November 19		Report		Stadium: University of Texas; Austin, Texas

6:00pm CST	Penn State	1–1	Florida	Field 2
Fri, November 19		Report		Stadium: University of Texas; Austin, Texas

Group B
Pos	Team	Pld	W	D	L	GF	GA	GD	Pts	Qualification
1	Colorado	3	1	2	0	5	2	+3	5	Advanced to knockout stage
2	UC-Berkeley	3	1	2	0	3	2	+1	5	Advanced to knockout stage
3	Indiana	3	1	1	1	4	4	0	4	
4	Virginia	3	0	1	2	1	5	−4	1	

Scores

10:00am CST	Colorado	3–0	Indiana	Field 6
Fri, November 19		Report		Stadium: University of Texas; Austin, Texas

10:00am CST	UC-Berkeley	1–0	Virginia	Field 10
Fri, November 19		Report		Stadium: University of Texas; Austin, Texas

2:00pm CST	Virginia	1–1	Colorado	Field 6
Fri, November 19		Report		Stadium: University of Texas; Austin, Texas

2:00pm CST	Indiana	1–1	UC-Berkeley	Field 10
Fri, November 19		Report		Stadium: University of Texas; Austin, Texas

6:00pm CST	Colorado	1–1	UC-Berkeley	Field 6
Fri, November 19		Report		Stadium: University of Texas; Austin, Texas

6:00pm CST	Virginia	0–3	Indiana	Field 10
Fri, November 19		Report		Stadium: University of Texas; Austin, Texas

Group C
Pos	Team	Pld	W	D	L	GF	GA	GD	Pts	Qualification
1	UC-Santa Barbara	3	3	0	0	8	0	+8	9	Advanced to knockout stage
2	JMU	3	2	0	1	4	2	+2	6	Advanced to knockout stage
3	Michigan State	3	1	0	2	3	6	−3	3	
4	Princeton	3	0	0	3	1	8	−7	0	

Scores

11:00am CST	Michigan State	2–1	Princeton	Field 1
Fri, November 19		Report		Stadium: University of Texas; Austin, Texas

11:00am CST	JMU	0–1	UC-Santa Barbara	Field 2
Fri, November 19		Report		Stadium: University of Texas; Austin, Texas

3:00pm CST	UC-Santa Barbara	3–0	Michigan State	Field 1
Fri, November 19		Report		Stadium: University of Texas; Austin, Texas

3:00pm CST	Princeton	0–2	JMU	Field 2
Fri, November 19		Report		Stadium: University of Texas; Austin, Texas

7:00pm CST	Michigan State	1–2	JMU	Field 1
Fri, November 19		Report		Stadium: University of Texas; Austin, Texas

7:00pm CST	UC-Santa Barbara	4–0	Princeton	Field 2
Fri, November 19		Report		Stadium: University of Texas; Austin, Texas

Group D
Pos	Team	Pld	W	D	L	GF	GA	GD	Pts	Qualification
1	Colorado State	3	2	1	0	6	2	+4	7	Advanced to knockout stage
2	Delaware	3	2	0	1	5	4	+1	6	Advanced to knockout stage
3	Miami (OH)	3	1	1	1	2	2	0	4	
4	Baylor	3	0	0	3	2	7	−5	0	

Scores

11:00am CST	Colorado State	3–0	Baylor	Field 6
Fri, November 19		Report		Stadium: University of Texas; Austin, Texas

11:00am CST	Miami (OH)	0–1	Delaware	Field 10
Fri, November 19		Report		Stadium: University of Texas; Austin, Texas

3:00pm CST	Delaware	1–2	Colorado State	Field 6
Fri, November 19		Report		Stadium: University of Texas; Austin, Texas

3:00pm CST	Baylor	0–1	Miami (OH)	Field 10
Fri, November 19		Report		Stadium: University of Texas; Austin, Texas

7:00pm CST	Colorado State	1–1	Miami (OH)	Field 6
Fri, November 19		Report		Stadium: University of Texas; Austin, Texas

7:00pm CST	Delaware	3–2	Baylor	Field 10
Fri, November 19		Report		Stadium: University of Texas; Austin, Texas

=== Men's open ===
Group J
Pos	Team	Pld	W	D	L	GF	GA	GD	Pts	Qualification
1	Texas State	2	1	1	0	4	2	+3	7	Advanced to knockout stage
2	Loyola Marymount (LMU)	2	1	0	1	4	3	+2	6	Advanced to knockout stage
3	Colorado "Black"	2	0	1	1	1	4	−2	4	
4	Florida State	Did not attend (All teams given 3 points and +1 goal difference)								

Scores

10:00am CST	Texas State	3–1	LMU	Field 5
Fri, November 19		Report		Stadium: University of Texas; Austin, Texas

3:00pm CST	LMU	3–0	Colorado "Black"	Field 4
Fri, November 19		Report		Stadium: University of Texas; Austin, Texas

8:00pm CST	Colorado "Black"	1–1	Texas State	Field 4
Fri, November 19		Report		Stadium: University of Texas; Austin, Texas

Group K
Pos	Team	Pld	W	D	L	GF	GA	GD	Pts	Qualification
1	Virginia	3	2	1	0	5	1	+4	7	Advanced to knockout stage
2	Southern Illinois (SIU)	3	2	0	1	5	4	+1	6	Advanced to knockout stage
3	Arizona State	3	1	1	1	2	2	0	4	
4	Texas Southern	3	0	0	3	1	6	−5	0	

Scores

11:00am CST	Virginia	1–0	Texas Southern	Field 4
Fri, November 19		Report		Stadium: University of Texas; Austin, Texas

11:00am CST	Arizona State	0–1	SIU	Field 5
Fri, November 19		Report		Stadium: University of Texas; Austin, Texas

4:00pm CST	SIU	1–4	Virginia	Field 4
Fri, November 19		Report		Stadium: University of Texas; Austin, Texas

4:00pm CST	Texas Southern	1–2	Arizona State	Field 5
Fri, November 19		Report		Stadium: University of Texas; Austin, Texas

9:00pm CST	Virginia	Unknown Assuming 0–0 draw	Arizona State	Field 4
Fri, November 19		Report		Stadium: University of Texas; Austin, Texas

9:00pm CST	SIU	Unknown Based on bracket, SIU likely won by 3+ Assuming 3–0 result	Texas Southern	Field 5
Fri, November 19		Report		Stadium: University of Texas; Austin, Texas

Group L
Pos	Team	Pld	W	D	L	GF	GA	GD	Pts	Qualification
1	Iowa State	3	2	1	0	5	0	+5	7	Advanced to knockout stage
2	Central Washington	3	1	2	0	2	1	+1	5	
3	UCF	3	0	2	1	1	2	−1	2	
4	North Dakota State	3	0	1	2	0	5	−5	1	

Scores

11:00am CST	Iowa State	1–0	UCF	Field 9
Fri, November 19		Report		Stadium: University of Texas; Austin, Texas

11:00am CST	Central Washington	1–0	North Dakota State	Field 11
Fri, November 19		Report		Stadium: University of Texas; Austin, Texas

4:00pm CST	North Dakota State	0–4	Iowa State	Field 9
Fri, November 19		Report		Stadium: University of Texas; Austin, Texas

4:00pm CST	UCF	1–1	Central Washington	Field 11
Fri, November 19		Report		Stadium: University of Texas; Austin, Texas

9:00pm CST	Iowa State	Unknown Based on bracket, Central Washington likely lost or tied Assuming 0–0 draw	Central Washington	Field 9
Fri, November 19		Report		Stadium: University of Texas; Austin, Texas

9:00pm CST	North Dakota State	Unknown Assuming 0–0 draw	UCF	Field 11
Fri, November 19		Report		Stadium: University of Texas; Austin, Texas

Group M
Pos	Team	Pld	W	D	L	GF	GA	GD	Pts	Qualification
1	Penn State	3	2	1	0	5	1	+4	7	Advanced to knockout stage
2	Texas A&M "B"	3	2	1	0	5	2	+3	7	Advanced to knockout stage
3	JMU	3	1	0	2	5	4	+1	3	
4	Snow College	3	0	0	3	1	9	−8	0	

Scores

12:00pm CST	JMU	0–3	Penn State	Field 9
Fri, November 19		Report		Stadium: University of Texas; Austin, Texas

12:00pm CST	Texas A&M "B"	3–1	Snow College	Field 11
Fri, November 19		Report		Stadium: University of Texas; Austin, Texas

5:00pm CST	Snow College	0–5	JMU	Field 9
Fri, November 19		Report		Stadium: University of Texas; Austin, Texas

5:00pm CST	Penn State	1–1	Texas A&M "B"	Field 11
Fri, November 19		Report		Stadium: University of Texas; Austin, Texas

10:00pm CST	JMU	Unknown Based on bracket, Texas A&M likely won Assuming 1–0 result	Texas A&M "B"	Field 9
Fri, November 19		Report		Stadium: University of Texas; Austin, Texas

10:00pm CST	Snow College	Unknown Based on bracket, Penn State likely won Assuming 1–0 result	Penn State	Field 11
Fri, November 19		Report		Stadium: University of Texas; Austin, Texas

Group N
Pos	Team	Pld	W	D	L	GF	GA	GD	Pts	Qualification
1	Long Beach State	3	1	2	0	4	3	+1	5	Advanced to knockout stage
2	Nebraska	3	1	2	0	2	1	+1	5	
3	UTEP	3	0	2	1	7	8	−1	2	
4	Duke	3	0	2	1	3	4	−1	2	

Scores

12:00pm CST	Long Beach State	3–3	UTEP	Field 4
Fri, November 19		Report		Stadium: University of Texas; Austin, Texas

12:00pm CST	Duke	0–0	Nebraska	Field 5
Fri, November 19		Report		Stadium: University of Texas; Austin, Texas

5:00pm CST	Nebraska	0–0	Long Beach State	Field 9
Fri, November 19		Report		Stadium: University of Texas; Austin, Texas

5:00pm CST	UTEP	3–3	Duke	Field 11
Fri, November 19		Report		Stadium: University of Texas; Austin, Texas

10:00pm CST	Long Beach State	1–0	Duke	Field 5
Fri, November 19		Report		Stadium: University of Texas; Austin, Texas

10:00pm CST	Nebraska	2–1	UTEP	Field 4
Fri, November 19		Report		Stadium: University of Texas; Austin, Texas

=== Women's open ===
Group E
Pos	Team	Pld	W	D	L	GF	GA	GD	Pts	Qualification
1	LSU	3	3	0	0	7	1	+6	9	Advanced to knockout stage
2	Colorado State "Green"	3	1	1	1	5	5	0	4	
3	Yale	3	0	2	1	2	3	−1	2	
4	NC State	3	0	1	2	0	5	−5	1	

Scores

8:00am CST	Yale	0–0	NC State	Field 4
Fri, November 19		Report		Stadium: University of Texas; Austin, Texas

8:00am CST	Colorado State	1–3	LSU	Field 5
Fri, November 19		Report		Stadium: University of Texas; Austin, Texas

1:00pm CST	LSU	1–0	Yale	Field 4
Fri, November 19		Report		Stadium: University of Texas; Austin, Texas

1:00pm CST	NC State	0–2	Colorado State	Field 5
Fri, November 19		Report		Stadium: University of Texas; Austin, Texas

6:00pm CST	Yale	2–2	Colorado State	Field 4
Fri, November 19		Report		Stadium: University of Texas; Austin, Texas

6:00pm CST	LSU	3–0	NC State	Field 5
Fri, November 19		Report		Stadium: University of Texas; Austin, Texas

Group F
Pos	Team	Pld	W	D	L	GF	GA	GD	Pts	Qualification
1	UC-Davis	3	2	0	1	4	3	+1	6	Advanced to knockout stage
2	Virginia Tech	3	1	2	0	4	3	+1	5	Advanced to knockout stage
3	Western Michigan	3	1	1	1	1	1	0	4	
4	Iowa State	3	0	1	2	1	3	−2	1	

Scores

8:00am CST	Western Michigan	1–0	Iowa State	Field 9
Fri, November 19		Report		Stadium: University of Texas; Austin, Texas

8:00am CST	Virginia Tech	3–2	UC-Davis	Field 11
Fri, November 19		Report		Stadium: University of Texas; Austin, Texas

1:00pm CST	UC-Davis	1–0	Western Michigan	Field 9
Fri, November 19		Report		Stadium: University of Texas; Austin, Texas

1:00pm CST	Iowa State	1–1	Virginia Tech	Field 11
Fri, November 19		Report		Stadium: University of Texas; Austin, Texas

6:00pm CST	Western Michigan	0–0	Virginia Tech	Field 9
Fri, November 19		Report		Stadium: University of Texas; Austin, Texas

6:00pm CST	UC-Davis	1–0	Iowa State	Field 11
Fri, November 19		Report		Stadium: University of Texas; Austin, Texas

Group G
Pos	Team	Pld	W	D	L	GF	GA	GD	Pts	Qualification
1	Texas	3	2	0	1	4	3	+1	6	Advanced to knockout stage
2	Northern Colorado	3	2	0	1	2	3	−1	6	Advanced to knockout stage
3	Cornell	3	1	0	2	3	3	0	3	
4	Kansas	3	1	0	2	2	2	0	3	

Scores

9:00am CST	Cornell	3–0	Texas	Field 4
Fri, November 19		Report		Stadium: University of Texas; Austin, Texas

9:00am CST	Kansas	0–1	Northern Colorado	Field 5
Fri, November 19		Report		Stadium: University of Texas; Austin, Texas

2:00pm CST	Northern Colorado	1–0	Cornell	Field 4
Fri, November 19		Report		Stadium: University of Texas; Austin, Texas

2:00pm CST	Texas	1–0	Kansas	Field 5
Fri, November 19		Report		Stadium: University of Texas; Austin, Texas

7:00pm CST	Cornell	0–2	Kansas	Field 4
Fri, November 19		Report		Stadium: University of Texas; Austin, Texas

7:00pm CST	Northern Colorado	0–3	Texas	Field 5
Fri, November 19		Report		Stadium: University of Texas; Austin, Texas

Group H
Pos	Team	Pld	W	D	L	GF	GA	GD	Pts	Qualification
1	UCLA	3	2	0	1	5	1	+4	6	Advanced to knockout stage
2	Colorado Mines	3	1	1	1	3	3	0	4	
3	Ohio State	3	1	1	1	2	2	0	4	
4	Vermont	3	1	0	2	1	5	−4	3	

Scores

9:00am CST	UCLA	2–0	Colorado Mines	Field 9
Fri, November 19		Report		Stadium: University of Texas; Austin, Texas

9:00am CST	Ohio State	0–1	Vermont	Field 11
Fri, November 19		Report		Stadium: University of Texas; Austin, Texas

2:00pm CST	Vermont	0–3	UCLA	Field 9
Fri, November 19		Report		Stadium: University of Texas; Austin, Texas

2:00pm CST	Colorado Mines	1–1	Ohio State	Field 11
Fri, November 19		Report		Stadium: University of Texas; Austin, Texas

7:00pm CST	UCLA	0–1	Ohio State	Field 9
Fri, November 19		Report		Stadium: University of Texas; Austin, Texas

7:00pm CST	Vermont	0–2	Colorado Mines	Field 11
Fri, November 19		Report		Stadium: University of Texas; Austin, Texas

Group J
Pos	Team	Pld	W	D	L	GF	GA	GD	Pts	Qualification
1	Colorado "Black"	3	2	1	0	7	2	+5	7	Advanced to knockout stage
2	Illinois	3	2	1	0	4	2	+2	7	Advanced to knockout stage
3	Vanderbilt	3	1	0	2	3	5	−2	3	
4	Richmond	3	0	0	3	2	7	−5	0	

Scores

10:00am CST	Colorado	3–0	Richmond	Field 9
Fri, November 19		Report		Stadium: University of Texas; Austin, Texas

10:00am CST	Illinois	1–0	Vanderbilt	Field 11
Fri, November 19		Report		Stadium: University of Texas; Austin, Texas

3:00pm CST	Vanderbilt	0–2	Colorado	Field 9
Fri, November 19		Report		Stadium: University of Texas; Austin, Texas

3:00pm CST	Richmond	0–1	Illinois	Field 11
Fri, November 19		Report		Stadium: University of Texas; Austin, Texas

8:00pm CST	Colorado	2–2	Illinois	Field 9
Fri, November 19		Report		Stadium: University of Texas; Austin, Texas

8:00pm CST	Vanderbilt	3–2	Richmond	Field 11
Fri, November 19		Report		Stadium: University of Texas; Austin, Texas

== Tournament bracket ==
=== Men's championship ===
Sweet 16
Fri • 8:00pm • Field 1
UC-Santa Barbara	1
Vanderbilt	3
Fri • 8:00pm • Field 2
Cornell	0
Colorado State	1
Fri • 8:00pm • Field 6
Penn (pen.)	1
Michigan State	0
Fri • 8:00pm • Field 10
Georgia Tech	2
Texas A&M (pen.)	3
Fri • 9:00pm • Field 1
Weber State	0
Colorado	1
Fri • 9:00pm • Field 2
Kansas	0
North Carolina	1
Fri • 9:00pm • Field 6
Texas	1
UC-Berkeley	3
Fri • 9:00pm • Field 10
Navy	0
Minnesota	2

Quarterfinals
Sat • 9:30am • Field 1
Vanderbilt	0
Colorado State (pen.)	1
Sat • 9:30am • Field 2
Penn	1
Texas A&M	3
Sat • 9:30am • Field 6
Colorado	0
North Carolina	3
Sat • 9:30am • Field 10
UC-Berkeley	3
Minnesota	2

Semifinals (Cancelled)
Sat • 2:30pm • Field 2 (Cancelled)
Colorado State
Texas A&M
Sat • 2:30pm • Field 6 (Cancelled)
North Carolina
UC-Berkeley

Finals (Cancelled)
Sat • 6:00pm • Field 2 (Cancelled)

==== Men's consolation ====
Quarterfinals
Sat • 8:00am • Field 4
Western Michigan	2
Miami (OH)	1
Sat • 8:00am • Field 5
Utah Valley State	3
Florida	2
Sat • 8:00am • Field 9
Dayton	3
Delaware	1
Sat • 8:00am • Field 11
Arizona	2
Oklahoma	1

Semifinals (Cancelled)
Sat • 1:00pm • Field 4 (Cancelled)
Western Michigan
Utah Valley State
Sat • 1:00pm • Field 5 (Cancelled)
Dayton
Arizona

Finals (Cancelled)
Sat • 5:00pm • Field 4 (Cancelled)

==== Men's continuation ====
The 24 teams that did not finish play (semifinalists in men's championship, women's championship, men's open, and men's consolation as well as quarterfinalists for women's open) in November 2004 were offered the opportunity to complete their bracket in Mesa, Arizona on Saturday, January 8, 2005. In order for the tournament to be held, at least 75% of the teams remaining in each division would need to agree to play. The only division that accomplished this was the men's championship that fielded 3 of the 4 remaining teams: Colorado State, UC-Berkeley, and Texas A&M. North Carolina elected not to participate in the continuation and finished fourth by default. The women's championship division decided to declare all four semifinalists national champions while the remaining divisions elected instead for a decision of no contest with no champion being declared, the first time in any division where this occurred.

===== Format =====
All teams were only allowed to use players that were certified on their original rosters. Since not all of the four teams were able to attend, a 3-team round robin was used to determine a champion. All games consisted of 40 minute halves, separated by a ten-minute half-time. Games that ended in a tie after regulation would go into a two ten-minute sudden victory overtime periods, changing ends after the conclusion of the first overtime period. If still tied, penalty kicks would determine a winner. Following the round robin, the champion would be the team with the best record using the 3 points for a win system.

Tie-breaking criteria for final standings
In the event that two teams ended with the same record, penalty kicks would determine the champion. If all three teams were tied, a three team penalty shootout would take place such that there will be 3 sets of kicks where:
- Team A shoots against Team C
- Team C shoots against Team B
- Team B shoots against Team A
- Team A shoots against Team B
- Team C shoots against Team A
- Team B shoots against Team C

This means, each team would take 6 kicks, 3 against each team. If after all shooters finished, all three teams are tied, the set of kicks (i.e. 2 kickers per team) would restart until one or two teams scored more than the other(s). If after all shooters finished and two teams remain tied, those two teams would engage in a standard 5 player, per team, penalty kick process to determine the champion.

===== Competition =====
Pos	Team	Pld	W	L	Pts	Finish
1	Texas A&M	2	2	0	6	Champions
2	Colorado State	2	1	1	3	Runner up
3	UC-Berkeley	2	0	2	0	Third place
4	North Carolina	Did not attend				Fourth place

Scores

9:00am MST	UC-Berkeley	0–2	Colorado State	Field 3
Sat, January 8		Report		Stadium: Red Mountain Soccer Complex; Mesa, Arizona

1:30pm MST	Colorado State	0–1	Texas A&M	Field 3
Sat, January 8		Report		Stadium: Red Mountain Soccer Complex; Mesa, Arizona

8:00pm MST	Texas A&M	2–0	UC-Berkeley	Field 3
Sat, January 8		Report		Stadium: Red Mountain Soccer Complex; Mesa, Arizona

=== Women's championship ===
Quarterfinals
Sat • 8:00am • Field 1
Michigan (pen.)	1
UC-Berkeley	0
Sat • 8:00am • Field 2
JMU	0
Colorado State	1
Sat • 8:00am • Field 6
UC-Santa Barbara	5
Delaware	0
Sat • 8:00am • Field 10
Florida	2
Colorado	3

Semifinals (Cancelled)
Sat • 1:00pm • Field 6 (Cancelled)
Michigan
Colorado State
Sat • 1:00pm • Field 10 (Cancelled)
UC-Santa Barbara
Colorado

Finals (Cancelled)
Sat • 6:00pm • Field 6 (Cancelled)

=== Men's open ===
Quarterfinals
Sat • 9:30am • Field 3
Iowa State (pen.)	2
Texas A&M	1
Sat • 9:30am • Field 5
Virginia	5
Texas State	1
Sat • 9:30am • Field 9
Penn State	2
SIU	0
Sat • 9:30am • Field 11
LMU	7
Long Beach State	0

Semifinals (Cancelled)
Sat • 1:00pm • Field 1 (Cancelled)
Iowa State
Virginia
Sat • 1:00pm • Field 2 (Cancelled)
Penn State
LMU

Finals (Cancelled)
Sat • 5:00pm • Field 10 (Cancelled)

=== Women's open ===
Quarterfinals (Cancelled)
Sat • 11:00am • Field 4 (Cancelled)
LSU
Illinois
Sat • 11:00am • Field 5 (Cancelled)
Texas
UC-Davis
Sat • 11:00am • Field 9 (Cancelled)
Colorado "Black"
Northern Colorado
Sat • 11:00am • Field 11 (Cancelled)
Virginia Tech
UCLA

Semifinals (Cancelled)
Sat • 2:30pm • Field 9 (Cancelled)
Sat • 2:30pm • Field 11 (Cancelled)

Finals (Cancelled)
Sat • 6:00pm • Field 1 (Cancelled)

== All tournament teams ==
=== Men's championship ===
Name	Team
Bill Besançon (MVP)	Texas A&M
Jonathan Mills	North Carolina
Austin Collins	North Carolina
John Lerch	UC-Berkeley
Bryon Winget	UC-Berkeley
Aaron Ogorzalek	Colorado State
Andrew Delmenhors	Colorado State
Chris Taylor	Colorado State
David Yeager	Texas A&M
Oscar Almeida	Texas A&M
Matt Yeager	Texas A&M
Tim White	Texas A&M
