= 2008 NIRSA National Soccer Championship =

- League: NIRSA
- Sport: Soccer
- Site: University of Alabama; Tuscaloosa, AL
- Duration: November 20–22, 2008
- Teams: 24 (Men's championship); 19 (Women's open); 18 (Men's open); 16 (Women's championship)
- Results: Official Results

Men's Championship Division
- Score: 1–0
- Champion: Indiana (1st title, 1st title game)
- Runners-up: Colorado State (2nd title game)
- Season MVP: Samuel Delisio (Indiana), Golden Glove Award: Steven Smith (Indiana)

Women's Championship Division
- Score: 4–1
- Champion: UC-Santa Barbara (3rd title, 4th title game)
- Runners-up: Arizona (1st title game)
- Season MVP: Allie Browne (UC-Santa Barbara)

Men's Open Division
- Score: 5–0
- Champion: UC-Berkeley (1st title, 2nd title game)
- Runners-up: Northern Iowa (1st title game)
- Season MVP: Ben Smith (UC-Berkeley)

Women's Open Division
- Score: 2–0
- Champion: UCLA (1st title, 1st title game)
- Runners-up: East Carolina (1st title game)
- Top seed: Kyrstie Wade (UCLA)

NIRSA national soccer championships seasons
- ← 2007 2009 →

The 2008 NIRSA national soccer championship was the 15th NIRSA National Soccer Championships, the annual national championships for United States-based, collegiate club soccer teams organized by NIRSA. It took place at the University of Alabama, in Tuscaloosa, Alabama from Thursday, November 20 to Saturday, November 22, 2008.

== Overview ==
=== Men's championship ===
In the finals, 2004 runners-up, Colorado State, would face finals debutants Indiana ensuring the men's championship division would crown a new winner. Coming into the finals, both teams tied a group stage game with Colorado State tying their opener against Ohio State and Indiana tying their finale against Florida.

In the knockout round, Colorado State would beat North Carolina then 2000 champion Penn State, both by a score of 1–0, followed by a 2–1 overtime win over USC in the semifinals. Meanwhile, after winning their round of 16 match against Minnesota 3–0, Indiana would require penalty kicks to decide their next two matches: first against UW-Milwaukee in the quarterfinals with a score of 6–5 after seven kicks following a 0–0 score in regulation and then against Ohio State in the semifinals with a score of 7–6 following a 1–1 score in regulation. In the finals, Indiana would open the scoring in via a goal in the 3rd minute from eventual tournament MVP Samuel Delisio. This would prove to be the only goal of the game and would see Indiana win 1–0 and claim their first national title. Steven Smith of Indiana earned the Golden Glove award for most outstanding goalkeeper of the tournament, giving up only two goals throughout the entire tournament.

=== Women's championship ===
In the finals, reigning champions UC-Santa Barbara would face finals debutants Arizona. Coming into the finals, UC-Santa Barbara would win all three group stage matches by an average margin of 5 goals while not conceding a goal in any of their games. In the knockout round, they'd beat four-time champion Colorado 2–0 in the quarterfinals but would require overtime in a 2–1 win over 2001 champions Penn State in the semifinals. Meanwhile, Arizona would win their first match against Michigan State 1–0, tie Colorado State 0–0 then lose to Penn State 1–0, advancing to the knockout round over Michigan State on the head-to-head tiebreaker. In the knockout round, Arizona would beat 2005 champion Michigan 2–1 in the quarterfinals then would require penalties against Dayton in the semifinals after a 0–0 score following regulation and overtime. They would win the shoot-out 4–2. In the finals, UC-Santa Barbara would open the scoring with a goal from eventual MVP Allie Browne in the 16th minute. They would then score the next three goals of the match in the 40th minute from Hannah Sasson, in the 46th minute from Natalie Lemonnier, and in the 75th minute from Shelly Murphy. A goal from Kara Mallari in the 76th minute from Arizona would be the last goal of the game as UC-Santa Barbara would win 4–1 and win their third national title; all within the last five years. This title would also mean UC-Santa Barbara would become the only outright women's championship back to back champion (Michigan would win back to back titles in 2004 and 2005, but the 2004 was not an outright title).

=== Men's open ===
In the finals, 2005 runners-up UC-Berkeley would face finals debutants Northern Iowa. While both teams began in group D, due to the format of the tournament this would be their first matchup. Coming into the finals, both teams would beat Minnesota State and Central Washington in the group stage; but, while UC-Berkeley would beat San Diego State 1–0 in their opener, Northern Iowa lose to them 2–0 in their group stage finale. In the knockout round, both teams would require overtime in the quarterfinals: UC-Berkeley would beat Alabama 3–2 in overtime while Northern Iowa would beat Villanova 4–2 in penalties after a 1–1 draw following regulation and overtime. Both teams would win their semifinal matchup 4–1 with UC-Berkeley's win over Virginia Tech and Northern Iowa's over Kansas. In the finals, UC-Berkeley would go on to beat Northern Iowa 5–0, claiming their first men's open title. UC-Berkeley's Ben Smith would go on to be named men's open MVP.

=== Women's open ===
In the finals, two finals debutants would face off in UCLA and East Carolina. Coming into the finals, would win all three group stage games while East Carolina would tie their opener to JMU 0–0 but would win their next two and would be a wild-card team after losing the automatic knockout round bid to JMU on goal difference. In the knockout round, UCLA would win their quarterfinal and semifinal matchups 3–1 against MTSU and JMU respectively while East Carolina would win their quarterfinal and semifinal matchups 1–0 over Towson and UC-Berkeley respectively. In the finals, UCLA would go on to win 2–0 and claim their first women's open title. UCLA's Kyrstie Wade would be named women's open MVP.

== Format ==
The competition consisted of 77 teams: 40 championship teams and 37 open teams. The divisions were further divided into a men's and women's division: 24 men's and 16 women's teams in the championship division and 19 women's and 18 men's teams in the open division. The divisions were then further divided into groups: eight groups of three teams in the men's championship, four teams of four teams in the women's championship, three groups of four plus two groups of three in the men's open, and four groups of four plus one group of 3 in the women's open with all four divisions engaging in a round-robin tournament that determined teams able to advance to a knockout stage. In all but the three team groups in the men's open division, each team played each other team in their group once while the two three-team groups in the men's open played every team in the opposing three-team group once. Pool play games were two 40-minute halves, separated by a seven-minute halftime and utilized the three points for a win system. After group stage play, the two highest ranked teams from each group in the championship division advanced to their respective knockout stage, with the third placed team in the men's championship advancing to a consolation bracket and the third and fourth placed teams in the women's championship being eliminated. In the open divisions, each pool winner automatically advanced in addition to three additional wild-card teams. Positions 1 and 8 were given to first place teams in groups that didn't have a wild-card team in order of tie-breaking procedures, positions 2, 6, and 7 were given to wild-card teams in order of tie-breaking procedures, and positions 5, 3, and 4 were given to the pool winners from the pools of the 2, 6, and 7 positioned wild-card teams, respectively.

Tie-breaking criteria for group play
The ranking of teams in each group was based on the following criteria in order:
1. Highest number of points
2. Winner of head-to-head competition
3. Greatest goal difference
  - Maximum ± 5 goal difference per match
4. Most goals scored
5. Most shutouts

In a tie breaking scenario involving more than 2 teams, the tiebreaker procedure would begin. If one team is identified as different and both remaining teams are still tied, the tie breaker procedure is restarted.

If a tie still remained after the first 5 criteria, the following was used to break a tie:

1. NCAA kicks from the mark
  - If there was a three-way tie, a coin-flip would be conducted. The two teams that chose the same outcome would compete in kicks from the mark between each other. The winner would compete with the last remaining team in kicks from the mark
  - If there's a four-way tie, a drawing of lots would be conducted (only could occur in open division)

Knockout stage games also consisted of two 40-minute halves. The round of 16 and quarterfinals were separated by a seven-minute halftime while the semifinals and finals had a ten-minute halftime. Knockout stage games needed to declare a winner, therefore if a game was tied at the end of regulation, one 15-minute, golden-goal overtime period would begin. If still tied after overtime, kicks from the mark would determine the winner.

== Qualification and selections ==
Each of the six regions received three automatic bids for the men's championship division and two automatic bids for the women's championship that they awarded to its members. The final bids for each division were considered "at-large", and were given out by NIRSA to teams, typically based on their regional tournament results and RPI.

The remaining teams participated in the open division, chosen on a first-come first-serve basis via online registration beginning on September 12, 2008.

=== Men's championship ===
Participating teams
Region	Team	Appearance	Last Bid
I	Penn State	9th	2007
I	Penn	4th	2007
I	Johns Hopkins	1st	Never
II	North Carolina	7th	2006
II	Virginia	4th	2005
II	Florida	3rd	2004
III	Indiana	5th	2007
III	Ohio State	5th	2007
III	Michigan State	3rd	2004
III	UW-Milwaukee	2nd	2007
III	UW-Eau Claire	1st	Never
IV	Texas A&M	9th	2007
IV	Baylor	3rd	1998
IV	Missouri	3rd	2006
IV	Texas State	3rd	1999
V	Colorado State	12th	2007
V	Colorado	9th	2006
V	Minnesota	7th	2007
V	North Dakota State	1st	Never
VI	Arizona	8th	2007
VI	UC-Santa Barabara	6th	2007
VI	Oregon	5th	2006
VI	UCLA	2nd	2007
VI	Southern Cal (USC)	1st	Never

=== Women's championship ===
Participating teams
Region	Team	Appearance	Last Bid
I	Penn State	14th	2007
I	Cornell	3rd	2007
I	Boston College	2nd	2006
II	Virginia Tech	8th	2007
II	Florida	7th	2005
II	North Carolina	6th	2007
III	Michigan	10th	2007
III	Michigan State	6th	2007
III	Dayton	4th	2006
IV	Baylor	6th	2004
IV	UTSA	1st	Never
V	Colorado	14th	2007
V	Colorado State	12th	2007
VI	San Diego State	8th	2007
VI	UC-Santa Barbara	8th	2007
VI	Arizona	4th	2006

=== Men's open ===
Participating teams
Region	Num	Team
I	2	Towson, Villanova
II	7	Alabama, JMU, Auburn, Georgia, UCF, Virginia Tech, Samford
III	0	–
IV	2	Kansas, UL-Lafayette
V	4	Air Force, Minnesota State, Northern Iowa, Iowa State
VI	3	San Diego State, Central Washington, UC-Berkeley

=== Women's open ===
Participating teams
Region	Num	Team
I	2	Towson, Villanova
II	7	MTSU, Alabama, Virginia, JMU, Miami (FL), East Carolina, UCF
III	1	Illinois
IV	4	Truman State, Texas State, Missouri, Kansas
V	3	Colorado State, Iowa State, Colorado
VI	2	UC-Berkeley, UCLA

== Group stage ==
=== Men's championship ===
Group A
Pos	Team	Pld	W	D	L	GF	GA	GD	Pts	Qualification
1	Texas State	2	2	0	0	4	1	+3	6	Advanced to knockout stage
2	Minnesota	2	1	0	1	3	3	0	3	Advanced to knockout stage
3	Arizona	2	0	0	2	2	5	−3	0	Consolation

Scores

8:00am CST	Arizona	1–3	Minnesota	Field 1
Thu, November 20		Report		Stadium: University of Alabama; Tuscaloosa, AL

2:00pm CST	Minnesota	0–2	Texas State	Field 1
Thu, November 20		Report		Stadium: University of Alabama; Tuscaloosa, AL

8:00pm CST	Texas State	2–1	Arizona	Field 1
Thu, November 20		Report		Stadium: University of Alabama; Tuscaloosa, AL

Group B
Pos	Team	Pld	W	D	L	GF	GA	GD	Pts	Qualification
1	North Carolina	2	1	1	0	5	2	+3	4	Advanced to knockout stage
2	Missouri	2	0	2	0	3	3	0	2	Advanced to knockout stage
3	UCLA	2	0	1	1	3	6	−3	1	Consolation

Scores

8:00am CST	North Carolina	1–1	Missouri	Field 2
Thu, November 20		Report		Stadium: University of Alabama; Tuscaloosa, AL

2:00pm CST	Missouri	2–2	UCLA	Field 2
Thu, November 20		Report		Stadium: University of Alabama; Tuscaloosa, AL

8:00pm CST	UCLA	1–4	North Carolina	Field 2
Thu, November 20		Report		Stadium: University of Alabama; Tuscaloosa, AL

Group C
Pos	Team	Pld	W	D	L	GF	GA	GD	Pts	Qualification
1	Ohio State	2	1	1	0	4	2	+2	4	Advanced to knockout stage
2	Colorado State	2	1	1	0	2	1	+1	4	Advanced to knockout stage
3	Oregon	2	0	0	2	3	6	−3	0	Consolation

Scores

8:00am CST	Ohio State	0–0	Colorado State	Field 3
Thu, November 20		Report		Stadium: University of Alabama; Tuscaloosa, AL

2:00pm CST	Colorado State	2–1	Oregon	Field 3
Thu, November 20		Report		Stadium: University of Alabama; Tuscaloosa, AL

8:00pm CST	Oregon	2–4	Ohio State	Field 3
Thu, November 20		Report		Stadium: University of Alabama; Tuscaloosa, AL

Group D
Pos	Team	Pld	W	D	L	GF	GA	GD	Pts	Qualification
1	Indiana	2	1	1	0	3	1	+2	4	Advanced to knockout stage
2	Florida	2	0	2	0	2	2	0	2	Advanced to knockout stage
3	Johns Hopkins	2	0	1	1	1	3	−2	1	Consolation

Scores

8:00am CST	Florida	1–1	Johns Hopkins	Field 4
Thu, November 20		Report		Stadium: University of Alabama; Tuscaloosa, AL

2:00pm CST	Johns Hopkins	0–2	Indiana	Field 4
Thu, November 20		Report		Stadium: University of Alabama; Tuscaloosa, AL

8:00pm CST	Indiana	1–1	Florida	Field 4
Thu, November 20		Report		Stadium: University of Alabama; Tuscaloosa, AL

Group E
Pos	Team	Pld	W	D	L	GF	GA	GD	Pts	Qualification
1	Michigan State	2	2	0	0	7	1	+6	6	Advanced to knockout stage
2	Texas A&M	2	0	1	1	1	2	−1	1	Advanced to knockout stage
3	UPenn	2	0	1	1	0	5	−5	1	Consolation

Scores

8:00am CST	Michigan State	2–1	Texas A&M	Field 5
Thu, November 20		Report		Stadium: University of Alabama; Tuscaloosa, AL

2:00pm CST	Texas A&M	0–0	UPenn	Field 5
Thu, November 20		Report		Stadium: University of Alabama; Tuscaloosa, AL

8:00pm CST	UPenn	0–5	Michigan State	Field 5
Thu, November 20		Report		Stadium: University of Alabama; Tuscaloosa, AL

Group F
Pos	Team	Pld	W	D	L	GF	GA	GD	Pts	Qualification
1	Colorado	2	1	1	0	6	1	+5	4	Advanced to knockout stage
2	Virginia	2	0	2	0	3	3	0	2	Advanced to knockout stage
3	UW-Eau Claire	2	0	1	1	2	7	−5	1	Consolation

Scores

8:00am CST	Colorado	5–0	UW-Eau Claire	Field 6
Thu, November 20		Report		Stadium: University of Alabama; Tuscaloosa, AL

2:00pm CST	UW-Eau Claire	2–2	Virginia	Field 6
Thu, November 20		Report		Stadium: University of Alabama; Tuscaloosa, AL

8:00pm CST	Virginia	1–1	Colorado	Field 6
Thu, November 20		Report		Stadium: University of Alabama; Tuscaloosa, AL

Group G
Pos	Team	Pld	W	D	L	GF	GA	GD	Pts	Qualification
1	Penn State	2	1	1	0	4	3	+1	4	Advanced to knockout stage
2	UC-Santa Barbara	2	1	1	0	1	0	+1	4	Advanced to knockout stage
3	Baylor	2	0	0	2	3	5	−2	0	Consolation

Scores

8:00am CST	UCSB	1–0	Baylor	Field 7
Thu, November 20		Report		Stadium: University of Alabama; Tuscaloosa, AL

2:00pm CST	Baylor	3–4	Penn State	Field 7
Thu, November 20		Report		Stadium: University of Alabama; Tuscaloosa, AL

8:00pm CST	Penn State	0–0	UCSB	Field 7
Thu, November 20		Report		Stadium: University of Alabama; Tuscaloosa, AL

Group H
Pos	Team	Pld	W	D	L	GF	GA	GD	Pts	Qualification
1	Southern Cal (USC)	2	2	0	0	4	1	+3	6	Advanced to knockout stage
2	UW Milwaukee	2	1	0	1	3	3	0	3	Advanced to knockout stage
3	North Dakota St. (NDSU)	2	0	0	2	0	3	−3	0	Consolation

Scores

8:00am CST	UW Milwaukee	1–3	USC	Field 8
Thu, November 20		Report		Stadium: University of Alabama; Tuscaloosa, AL

2:00pm CST	USC	1–0	NDSU	Field 8
Thu, November 20		Report		Stadium: University of Alabama; Tuscaloosa, AL

8:00pm CST	NDSU	0–2	UW Milwaukee	Field 8
Thu, November 20		Report		Stadium: University of Alabama; Tuscaloosa, AL

=== Women's championship ===
Group A
Pos	Team	Pld	W	D	L	GF	GA	GD	Pts	Qualification
1	Penn State	3	2	0	1	4	2	+2	6	Advanced to knockout stage
2	Arizona	3	1	1	1	1	1	0	4	Advanced to knockout stage
3	Michigan State	3	1	1	1	1	1	0	4	
4	Colorado State	3	0	2	1	1	3	−2	2	

Scores

10:00am CST	Michigan St.	0–1	Arizona	Field 7
Thu, November 20		Report		Stadium: University of Alabama; Tuscaloosa, AL

10:00am CST	Colorado St.	1–3	Penn State	Field 8
Thu, November 20		Report		Stadium: University of Alabama; Tuscaloosa, AL

4:00pm CST	Penn State	0–1	Michigan St.	Field 5
Thu, November 20		Report		Stadium: University of Alabama; Tuscaloosa, AL

4:00pm CST	Arizona	0–0	Colorado St.	Field 6
Thu, November 20		Report		Stadium: University of Alabama; Tuscaloosa, AL

8:00am CST	Michigan St.	0–0	Colorado St	Field 6
Fri, November 21		Report		Stadium: University of Alabama; Tuscaloosa, AL

8:00am CST	Penn State	1–0	Arizona	Field 5
Fri, November 21		Report		Stadium: University of Alabama; Tuscaloosa, AL

Group B
Pos	Team	Pld	W	D	L	GF	GA	GD	Pts	Qualification
1	Michigan	3	3	0	0	7	1	+6	9	Advanced to knockout stage
2	San Diego State	3	2	0	1	3	3	0	6	Advanced to knockout stage
3	Virginia Tech	3	1	0	2	4	2	+2	3	
4	UTSA	3	0	0	3	0	8	−8	0	

Scores

10:00am CST	San Diego State	1–0	UTSA	Field 9
Thu, November 20		Report		Stadium: University of Alabama; Tuscaloosa, AL

10:00am CST	Virginia Tech	0–1	Michigan	Field 10
Thu, November 20		Report		Stadium: University of Alabama; Tuscaloosa, AL

4:00pm CST	Michigan	3–1	San Diego State	Field 7
Thu, November 20		Report		Stadium: University of Alabama; Tuscaloosa, AL

4:00pm CST	UTSA	0–4	Virginia Tech	Field 8
Thu, November 20		Report		Stadium: University of Alabama; Tuscaloosa, AL

8:00am CST	San Diego State	1–0	Virginia Tech	Field 8
Fri, November 21		Report		Stadium: University of Alabama; Tuscaloosa, AL

8:00am CST	Michigan	3–0	UTSA	Field 7
Fri, November 21		Report		Stadium: University of Alabama; Tuscaloosa, AL

Group C
Pos	Team	Pld	W	D	L	GF	GA	GD	Pts	Qualification
1	UC-Santa Barbara	3	3	0	0	15	0	+12	9	Advanced to knockout stage
2	Dayton	3	2	0	1	4	3	+1	6	Advanced to knockout stage
3	Boston College	3	1	0	2	1	6	−5	3	
4	North Carolina	3	0	0	3	1	12	−8	0	

Scores

12:00pm CST	UCSB	8–0	North Carolina	Field 5
Thu, November 20		Report		Stadium: University of Alabama; Tuscaloosa, AL

12:00pm CST	Dayton	1–0	Boston College	Field 6
Thu, November 20		Report		Stadium: University of Alabama; Tuscaloosa, AL

6:00pm CST	Boston College	0–5	UCSB	Field 7
Thu, November 20		Report		Stadium: University of Alabama; Tuscaloosa, AL

6:00pm CST	North Carolina	1–3	Dayton	Field 8
Thu, November 20		Report		Stadium: University of Alabama; Tuscaloosa, AL

10:00am CST	UCSB	2–0	Dayton	Field 8
Fri, November 21		Report		Stadium: University of Alabama; Tuscaloosa, AL

10:00am CST	Boston College	1–0	North Carolina	Field 7
Fri, November 21		Report		Stadium: University of Alabama; Tuscaloosa, AL

Group D
Pos	Team	Pld	W	D	L	GF	GA	GD	Pts	Qualification
1	Baylor	3	1	2	0	5	4	+1	5	Advanced to knockout stage
2	Colorado	3	1	1	1	5	3	+2	4	Advanced to knockout stage
3	Florida	3	0	3	0	5	5	0	3	
4	Cornell	3	0	2	1	3	6	−3	2	

Scores

12:00pm CST	Florida	2–2	Baylor	Field 7
Thu, November 20		Report		Stadium: University of Alabama; Tuscaloosa, AL

12:00pm CST	Colorado	3–0	Cornell	Field 8
Thu, November 20		Report		Stadium: University of Alabama; Tuscaloosa, AL

6:00pm CST	Cornell	1–1	Florida	Field 9
Thu, November 20		Report		Stadium: University of Alabama; Tuscaloosa, AL

6:00pm CST	Baylor	1–0	Colorado	Field 10
Thu, November 20		Report		Stadium: University of Alabama; Tuscaloosa, AL

10:00am CST	Florida	2–2	Colorado	Field 10
Fri, November 21		Report		Stadium: University of Alabama; Tuscaloosa, AL

10:00am CST	Cornell	2–2	Baylor	Field 9
Fri, November 21		Report		Stadium: University of Alabama; Tuscaloosa, AL

=== Men's open ===
Group A
Pos	Team	Pld	W	D	L	GF	GA	GD	Pts	Qualification
1	Alabama	3	2	1	0	5	1	+4	7	Advanced to knockout stage
2	Kansas	3	2	0	1	5	3	+2	6	Advanced to knockout stage
3	Towson	3	0	2	1	3	5	−2	2	
4	Air Force	3	0	1	2	2	6	−4	1	

Scores

10:00am CST	Kansas	1–0	Air Force	Field 1
Thu, November 20		Report		Stadium: University of Alabama; Tuscaloosa, AL

10:00am CST	Towson	0–0	Alabama	Field 2
Thu, November 20		Report		Stadium: University of Alabama; Tuscaloosa, AL

4:00pm CST	Alabama	2–1	Kansas	Field 1
Thu, November 20		Report		Stadium: University of Alabama; Tuscaloosa, AL

4:00pm CST	Air Force	2–2	Towson	Field 2
Thu, November 20		Report		Stadium: University of Alabama; Tuscaloosa, AL

8:00am CST	Kansas	3–1	Towson	Field 1
Fri, November 21		Report		Stadium: University of Alabama; Tuscaloosa, AL

8:00am CST	Alabama	3–0	Air Force	Field 2
Fri, November 21		Report		Stadium: University of Alabama; Tuscaloosa, AL

Group C
Pos	Team	Pld	W	D	L	GF	GA	GD	Pts	Qualification
1	UL-Lafayette	3	2	0	1	5	6	−1	6	Advanced to knockout stage
2	Georgia	3	1	1	1	2	2	0	4	
3	JMU	3	1	1	1	1	2	−1	4	
4	Auburn	3	1	0	2	5	3	+2	3	

Scores

12:00pm CST	JMU	0–0	Georgia	Field 1
Thu, November 20		Report		Stadium: University of Alabama; Tuscaloosa, AL

12:00pm CST	Auburn	5–1	UL-Lafayette	Field 2
Thu, November 20		Report		Stadium: University of Alabama; Tuscaloosa, AL

6:00pm CST	UL-Lafayette	2–0	JMU	Field 1
Thu, November 20		Report		Stadium: University of Alabama; Tuscaloosa, AL

6:00pm CST	Georgia	1–0	Auburn	Field 2
Thu, November 20		Report		Stadium: University of Alabama; Tuscaloosa, AL

10:00am CST	JMU	1–0	Auburn	Field 1
Fri, November 21		Report		Stadium: University of Alabama; Tuscaloosa, AL

10:00am CST	UL-Lafayette	2–1	Georgia	Field 2
Fri, November 21		Report		Stadium: University of Alabama; Tuscaloosa, AL

Group E
Pos	Team	Pld	W	D	L	GF	GA	GD	Pts	Qualification
1	Villanova	3	2	1	0	5	2	+3	7	Advanced to knockout stage
2	Virginia Tech	3	1	2	0	2	1	+1	5	Advanced to knockout stage
3	Iowa State	3	1	1	1	2	2	0	4	
4	Samford	3	0	0	3	0	4	−4	0	

Scores

10:00am CST	Virginia Tech	1–1	Samford	Field 5
Thu, November 20		Report		Stadium: University of Alabama; Tuscaloosa, AL

10:00am CST	Iowa State	0–1	Villanova	Field 6
Thu, November 20		Report		Stadium: University of Alabama; Tuscaloosa, AL

6:00pm CST	Villanova	0–0	Virginia Tech	Field 5
Thu, November 20		Report		Stadium: University of Alabama; Tuscaloosa, AL

6:00pm CST	Samford	2–0	Iowa State	Field 6
Thu, November 20		Report		Stadium: University of Alabama; Tuscaloosa, AL

10:00am CST	Virginia Tech	1–0	Iowa State	Field 5
Fri, November 21		Report		Stadium: University of Alabama; Tuscaloosa, AL

10:00am CST	Villanova	1–2	Samford	Field 6
Fri, November 21		Report		Stadium: University of Alabama; Tuscaloosa, AL

Merged groups
Group B
Pos	Team	Pld	W	D	L	GF	GA	GD	Pts	Qualification
1	San Diego State	3	2	0	1	6	1	+5	6	Advanced to knockout stage
2	Central Washington	3	1	0	2	6	7	−1	3	
3	Minnesota State	3	0	0	3	0	11	−11	0	
Group D
Pos	Team	Pld	W	D	L	GF	GA	GD	Pts	Qualification
1	UC-Berkeley	3	3	0	0	9	2	+7	9	Advanced to knockout stage
2	Northern Iowa	3	2	0	1	8	5	+3	6	Advanced to knockout stage
3	UCF	3	1	0	2	2	5	−3	3	

Scores

10:00am CST	UC-Berkeley	1–0	SDSU	Field 3
Thu, November 20		Report		Stadium: University of Alabama; Tuscaloosa, AL

10:00am CST	Northern Iowa	4–0	Minnesota State	Field 4
Thu, November 20		Report		Stadium: University of Alabama; Tuscaloosa, AL

12:00pm CST	UCF	0–1	Central Wash	Field 3
Thu, November 20		Report		Stadium: University of Alabama; Tuscaloosa, AL

4:00pm CST	Minnesota State	0–5	UC-Berkeley	Field 3
Thu, November 20		Report		Stadium: University of Alabama; Tuscaloosa, AL

4:00pm CST	Central Wash	3–4	Northern Iowa	Field 4
Thu, November 20		Report		Stadium: University of Alabama; Tuscaloosa, AL

6:00pm CST	SDSU	4–0	UCF	Field 3
Thu, November 20		Report		Stadium: University of Alabama; Tuscaloosa, AL

8:00am CST	UC-Berkeley	3–2	Central Wash	Field 3
Fri, November 21		Report		Stadium: University of Alabama; Tuscaloosa, AL

8:00am CST	Northern Iowa	0–2	SDSU	Field 4
Fri, November 21		Report		Stadium: University of Alabama; Tuscaloosa, AL

10:00am CST	UCF	2–0	Minnesota State	Field 3
Fri, November 21		Report		Stadium: University of Alabama; Tuscaloosa, AL

=== Women's open ===
Group A
Pos	Team	Pld	W	D	L	GF	GA	GD	Pts	Qualification
1	Towson	3	3	0	0	8	0	+8	9	Advanced to knockout stage
2	MTSU	3	2	0	1	8	4	+4	6	Advanced to knockout stage
3	Colorado State "Green"	3	1	0	2	4	7	−3	3	
4	Iowa State	3	0	0	0	3	12	−9	0	

8:00am CST	Colorado State	3–2	Iowa State	Field 9
Thu, November 20		Report		Stadium: University of Alabama; Tuscaloosa, AL

8:00am CST	Towson	2–0	MTSU	Field 10
Thu, November 20		Report		Stadium: University of Alabama; Tuscaloosa, AL

4:00pm CST	MTSU	3–1	Colorado State	Field 9
Thu, November 20		Report		Stadium: University of Alabama; Tuscaloosa, AL

4:00pm CST	Iowa State	0–4	Towson	Field 10
Thu, November 20		Report		Stadium: University of Alabama; Tuscaloosa, AL

8:00am CST	Colorado State	0–2	Towson	Field 9
Fri, November 21		Report		Stadium: University of Alabama; Tuscaloosa, AL

8:00am CST	MTSU	5–1	Iowa State	Field 10
Fri, November 21		Report		Stadium: University of Alabama; Tuscaloosa, AL

Group B
Pos	Team	Pld	W	D	L	GF	GA	GD	Pts	Qualification
1	Villanova	3	3	0	0	8	0	+8	9	Advanced to knockout stage
2	Illinois	3	2	0	1	6	1	+5	6	Advanced to knockout stage
3	Truman State	3	0	1	2	2	8	−6	1	
4	Alabama	3	0	1	2	2	9	−7	1	

8:00am CST	Villanova	3–0	Alabama	Field 11
Thu, November 20		Report		Stadium: University of Alabama; Tuscaloosa, AL

8:00am CST	Illinois	2–0	Truman State	Field 12
Thu, November 20		Report		Stadium: University of Alabama; Tuscaloosa, AL

4:00pm CST	Truman State	0–4	Villanova	Field 11
Thu, November 20		Report		Stadium: University of Alabama; Tuscaloosa, AL

4:00pm CST	Alabama	0–4	Illinois	Field 12
Thu, November 20		Report		Stadium: University of Alabama; Tuscaloosa, AL

8:00am CST	Villanova	1–0	Illinois	Field 11
Fri, November 21		Report		Stadium: University of Alabama; Tuscaloosa, AL

8:00am CST	Truman State	2–2	Alabama	Field 12
Fri, November 21		Report		Stadium: University of Alabama; Tuscaloosa, AL

Group C
Pos	Team	Pld	W	D	L	GF	GA	GD	Pts	Qualification
1	UCLA	3	3	0	0	11	2	+9	9	Advanced to knockout stage
2	Colorado "Black"	3	2	0	1	4	2	+2	6	
3	Kansas	3	1	0	2	10	7	0	3	
4	UCF	3	0	0	0	2	16	−11	0	

10:00am CST	Colorado	2–0	UCF	Field 11
Thu, November 20		Report		Stadium: University of Alabama; Tuscaloosa, AL

10:00am CST	UCLA	4–1	Kansas	Field 12
Thu, November 20		Report		Stadium: University of Alabama; Tuscaloosa, AL

6:00pm CST	Kansas	0–2	Colorado	Field 11
Thu, November 20		Report		Stadium: University of Alabama; Tuscaloosa, AL

6:00pm CST	UCF	1–5	UCLA	Field 12
Thu, November 20		Report		Stadium: University of Alabama; Tuscaloosa, AL

10:00am CST	Colorado	0–2	UCLA	Field 11
Fri, November 21		Report		Stadium: University of Alabama; Tuscaloosa, AL

10:00am CST	Kansas	9–1	UCF	Field 12
Fri, November 21		Report		Stadium: University of Alabama; Tuscaloosa, AL

Group D
Pos	Team	Pld	W	D	L	GF	GA	GD	Pts	Qualification
1	UC-Berkeley	2	2	0	0	7	2	+6	9	Advanced to knockout stage
2	Texas State	2	0	1	1	2	3	0	4	
3	Virginia	2	0	1	1	2	6	−3	4	
4	Could not field team, all teams given +3 points and +1 GD									

12:00pm CST	UC-Berkeley	2–1	Texas State	Field 9
Thu, November 20		Report		Stadium: University of Alabama; Tuscaloosa, AL

8:00pm CST	Texas State	1–1	Virginia	Field 9
Thu, November 20		Report		Stadium: University of Alabama; Tuscaloosa, AL

12:00pm CST	UC-Berkeley	5–1	Virginia	Field 9
Fri, November 21		Report		Stadium: University of Alabama; Tuscaloosa, AL

Group E
Pos	Team	Pld	W	D	L	GF	GA	GD	Pts	Qualification
1	JMU	3	2	1	0	10	0	+9	7	Advanced to knockout stage
2	East Carolina	3	2	1	0	4	1	+3	7	Advanced to knockout stage
3	Miami (FL)	3	1	0	2	3	9	−5	3	
4	Missouri	3	0	0	3	1	8	−7	0	

12:00pm CST	JMU	0–0	East Carolina	Field 9
Thu, November 20		Report		Stadium: University of Alabama; Tuscaloosa, AL

12:00pm CST	Miami	2–1	Missouri	Field 12
Thu, November 20		Report		Stadium: University of Alabama; Tuscaloosa, AL

8:00pm CST	Missouri	0–4	JMU	Field 12
Thu, November 20		Report		Stadium: University of Alabama; Tuscaloosa, AL

6:00pm CST	East Carolina	2–1	Miami	Field 9
Thu, November 20		Report		Stadium: University of Alabama; Tuscaloosa, AL

12:00pm CST	JMU	6–0	Miami	Field 9
Fri, November 21		Report		Stadium: University of Alabama; Tuscaloosa, AL

10:00am CST	Missouri	0–2	East Carolina	Field 12
Fri, November 21		Report		Stadium: University of Alabama; Tuscaloosa, AL

== Tournament bracket ==
=== Men's championship ===
Sweet 16
Fri • 12:00pm • Field 1
Texas State	2 (2)
Florida (pen.)	2 (4)
Fri • 12:00pm • Field 2
Texas A&M	1
USC	2
Fri • 12:00pm • Field 3
Penn State (a.e.t.)	3
Virginia	2
Fri • 12:00pm • Field 4
Colorado State	1
North Carolina	0
Fri • 12:00pm • Field 5
Ohio State (a.e.t.)	4
Missouri	3
Fri • 12:00pm • Field 6
UC-Santa Barbara	2
Colorado	3
Fri • 12:00pm • Field 7
Michigan State	0
UW-Milwaukee (a.e.t.)	1
Fri • 12:00pm • Field 8
Minnesota	0
Indiana	3

Quarterfinals
Fri • 8:00pm • Field 7
Florida	0
USC	1
Fri • 8:00pm • Field 8
Penn State	0
Colorado State	1
Fri • 8:00pm • Field 5
Ohio State	3
Colorado	2
Fri • 8:00pm • Field 6
UW-Milwaukee	0 (5)
Indiana (pen.)	0 (6)

Semifinals
Sat • 10:00am • Field 3
USC	1
Colorado State (a.e.t.)	2
Sat • 10:00am • Field 4
Ohio State	1 (6)
Indiana (pen.)	1 (7)

Final
Sat • 5:00pm • Field 10
Colorado State	0
Indiana	1

==== Men's consolation ====
Quarterfinals
Fri • 6:00pm • Field 7
Arizona	3
UPenn	1
Fri • 6:00pm • Field 8
UW-Eau Claire	3
UCLA	1
Fri • 6:00pm • Field 9
Oregon	0
Baylor	1
Fri • 6:00pm • Field 10
NDSU	0
Johns Hopkins	2

Semifinals
Sat • 9:00am • Field 5
Arizona (pen.)	1 (3)
UW-Eau Claire	1 (1)
Sat • 9:00am • Field 6
Baylor	3
Johns Hopkins	1

Final
Sat • 2:00pm • Field 5
Arizona (pen.)	1 (5)
Baylor	1 (3)

=== Women's championship ===
Quarterfinals
Fri • 4:00pm • Field 5
Penn State (a.e.t.)	1
SDSU	0
Fri • 4:00pm • Field 6
UC-Santa Barbara	3
Colorado	0
Fri • 6:00pm • Field 7
Dayton	3
Baylor	1
Fri • 6:00pm • Field 8
Arizona	2
Michigan	1

Semifinals
Sat • 10:00am • Field 1
Penn State	1
UC-Santa Barbara (a.e.t.)	2
Sat • 10:00am • Field 2
Dayton	0 (2)
Arizona (pen.)	0 (4)

Final
Sat • 3:00pm • Field 10
UC-Santa Barbara	4
Arizona	1

=== Men's open ===
Quarterfinals
Fri • 4:00pm • Field 1
SDSU	1
Virginia Tech	2
Fri • 4:00pm • Field 2
UC-Berkeley (a.e.t.)	3
Alabama	2
Fri • 6:00pm • Field 3
Villanova	1 (2)
Northern Iowa (pen.)	1 (4)
Fri • 6:00pm • Field 4
Kansas	2
UL-Lafayette	1

Semifinals
Sat • 9:00am • Field 7
Virginia Tech	1
UC-Berkeley	4
Sat • 9:00am • Field 8
Northern Iowa	4
Kansas	1

Final
Sat • 2:00pm • Field 8
UC-Berkeley	5
Northern Iowa	0

=== Women's open ===
Quarterfinals
Fri • 6:00pm • Field 3
UCLA	3
MTSU	1
Fri • 6:00pm • Field 4
JMU	1
Villanova	0
Fri • 8:00pm • Field 3
Towson	0
East Carolina	1
Fri • 8:00pm • Field 4
Illinois	1
UC-Berkeley (a.e.t.)	2

Semifinals
Sat • 9:00am • Field 9
UCLA	3
JMU	1
Sat • 9:00am • Field 10
East Carolina	1
UC-Berkeley	0

Final
Sat • 2:00pm • Field 7
UCLA	2
East Carolina	0
