= 2006 NIRSA National Soccer Championship =

- League: NIRSA
- Sport: Soccer
- Site: Arizona State University; Tempe, Arizona
- Duration: November 16–18, 2006
- Teams: 24 (Men's championship); 20 (Women's open); 19 (Men's open); 16 (Women's championship)

Men's Championship Division
- Score: 1–0
- Champion: Michigan (1st title, 1st title game)
- Runners-up: Illinois (3rd title game)
- Season MVP: Brent Medema (Michigan)

Women's Championship Division
- Score: 2–1
- Champion: San Diego State (1st title, 1st title game)
- Runners-up: Colorado (6th title game)
- Season MVP: Cassidy Runyan (San Diego State)

Men's Open Division
- Score: 3–1
- Champion: Arizona State (1st title, 1st title game)
- Runners-up: Kansas (1st title game)
- Season MVP: Justin Klum (Arizona State)

Women's Open Division
- Score: 3–0
- Champion: UC-Santa Barbara (1st title, 1st title game)
- Runners-up: Colorado "Black" (2nd title game)
- Top seed: Morgan Tanner (UC-Santa Barbara)

NIRSA national soccer championships seasons
- ← 2005 2007 →

The 2006 NIRSA national soccer championship was the 13th NIRSA National Soccer Championships, the annual national championships for United States-based, collegiate club soccer teams organized by NIRSA. It took place at Arizona State University in Tempe, Arizona from Thursday, November 16 to Saturday, November 18, 2006.

== Overview ==
=== Men's championship ===
In the finals, winner of the 2003 men's championship game, Illinois, (title later stripped due to ineligible players) would face region III opponent and finals debutants Michigan. Coming into the finals, Illinois would tie their opener to eventual consolation champion Brown but would beat Arizona 1–0 to win their group. Meanwhile, Michigan would lose their opener to North Carolina 3–0 but would win their finale against Colorado State 1–0 and finish second in their group.

In the knockout round, Illinois would win their round of 16 match against Salt Lake Community College 1–0, then would beat regional opponent Ohio 5–4 on penalties in the quarterfinals following a 1–1 score in regulation and overtime, and finally would defeat UC-San Diego 3–1 in the semifinals. Meanwhile, Michigan would win their round of 16 match against Missouri 3–0, then would beat regional opponent Indiana 2–0 in the quarterfinals, and finally would beat Arizona 1–0 in the semifinals after scoring in the 65th minute. In the finals, eventual men's championship MVP, Brent Medema of Michigan, would score in the first half off of a corner in what would be the lone goal of the match, meaning Michigan would claim their first national title. Notably, Michigan's Tom McCurdy would be named to the all-tournament team and would make the varsity team two years later.

=== Women's championship ===
In the finals, four-time champion Colorado would take on finals debutants San Diego State. Coming into the finals, Colorado would win their opener against North Carolina, tie their second against Texas 2–2, then beat Cornell 3–1 in their finale to claim first place in the group while San Diego State would win their first games against Texas A&M and Penn State, respectively, both by a score of 4–1 but would tie their finale to reigning champions Michigan 1–0 and win their group. In the knockout round, Colorado would beat Texas A&M on penalties following a 0–0 game after regulation in the quarterfinals then would beat Virginia 2–0 in the semifinals. Meanwhile, San Diego State would beat Texas 2–0 in the quarterfinals then beat Michigan State 1–0 in the semifinals. In the finals, the game would be tied 1–1 with four minutes remaining in regulation when freshman Mandy Lenham would score what would be the game winner off a header to lead San Diego State to their first national title. San Diego State's Cassidy Runyan would be named women's championship MVP.

=== Men's open ===
In the finals, tournament hosts Arizona State would take on Kansas in what would be the first finals appearance for both teams. Coming into the finals, Arizona State would lose their opener to UC-Berkeley 2–0 but would beat Florida 2–0 then Iowa State 5–1 to win their group while Kansas, in their group of only three, would win both group stage games 2–0 to also win their group. In the knockout round, Arizona State would beat reigning men's championship runners-up Vanderbilt 4–0 in the quarterfinals then beat Colorado "Black" 1–0 in the semifinals. Meanwhile, Kansas would beat Minnesota State-Mankato 2–1 in the quarterfinals then beat Virginia 1–0 in the semifinals. In the finals, Arizona State would go on to win 3–1, claiming their first men's open title. Arizona State's goalkeeper Justin Klum would be named men's open MVP and best goalkeeper.

=== Women's open ===
In the finals, 2001 women's open champion Colorado "Black" would face 2004 women's championship co-champion UC-Santa Barbara. Coming into the finals, Colorado "Black" would win all three games while UC-Santa Barbara would lose their finale to JMU after winning their first two matches but would advance as a wildcard. In the knockout round, Colorado "Black" would beat UC-Berkeley in penalties in the quarterfinals following a 3–3 game in regulation, then would beat JMU in penalties following a 0–0 game in regulation. Meanwhile, UC-Santa Barbara would beat Florida 3–0 in the quarterfinals then Illinois 2–0 in the semifinals. In the finals, UC-Santa Barbara would go on to win 3–0 and claim their first women's open title. UC-Santa Barbara's Morgan Tanner would be named women's open MVP.

== Format ==
The competition consisted of 79 teams: 40 championship teams and 39 open teams. The divisions were further divided into a men's and women's division: 24 men's and 16 women's teams in the championship division and 20 women's and 19 men's teams in the open division. The divisions were then further divided into groups: eight groups of three teams in the men's championship, four teams of four teams in the women's championship and five groups of four teams each in the men's and women's open. All four divisions engaged in a round-robin tournament that determined teams able to advance to a knockout stage. Each team played every other team in their group once in pool play which consisted of two 40-minute halves separated by a seven-minute halftime. Pool play utilized the three points for a win system and after pool play, the two highest ranked teams from each group in the championship divisions advanced to their respective knockout stage, with the third placed team in the men's championship advancing to a consolation bracket while the third and fourth placed teams in the women's championship being eliminated. In the open divisions, each pool winner automatically advanced in addition to three additional wild-card teams. Positions 1 and 8 were given to first place teams in groups that didn't have a wild-card team in order of tie-breaking procedures, positions 2, 6, and 7 were given to wild-card teams in order of tie-breaking procedures, and positions 5, 3, and 4 were given to the pool winners from the pools of the 2, 6, and 7 positioned wild-card teams, respectively.

Tie-breaking criteria for group play
The ranking of teams in each group was based on the following criteria in order:
1. Highest number of points
2. Winner of head-to-head competition
3. Greatest goal difference
  - Maximum ± 5 goal difference per match
4. Most goals scored
5. Most shutouts

In a tie breaking scenario involving more than 2 teams, the tiebreaker procedure would begin. If one team is identified as different and both remaining teams are still tied, the tie breaker procedure is restarted.

If a tie still remained after the first 5 criteria, the following was used to break a tie:

1. NCAA kicks from the mark
  - If there was a three-way tie, a coin-flip would be conducted. The two teams that chose the same outcome would compete in kicks from the mark between each other. The winner would compete with the last remaining team in kicks from the mark
  - If there's a four-way tie, a drawing of lots would be conducted (only could occur in open division)

Knockout stage games also consisted of two 40-minute halves. The round of 16 and quarterfinals were separated by a seven-minute halftime while the semifinals and finals had a ten-minute halftime. Knockout stage games needed to declare a winner, therefore if a game was tied at the end of regulation, two five-minute overtime periods would be played to completion. If still tied after overtime, kicks from the mark would determine the winner.

== Qualification and selections ==
Each of the six regions received three automatic bids for the men's championship division and two automatic bids for the women's championship that they awarded to its members. The final bids for each division were considered "at-large", and were given out by NIRSA to teams, typically based on their regional tournament results and RPI.

The remaining teams participated in the open division, chosen on a first-come first-serve basis via online registration beginning on September 12, 2006 with a max of 16 teams per gender division.

=== Men's championship ===
Participating teams
Region	Team	Appearance	Last Bid
I	Cornell	7th	2005
I	Penn State	7th	2005
I	Brown	1st	Never
II	North Carolina	6th	2005
II	Mississippi State	4th	2003
II	Virginia Tech	4th	2005
II	Auburn	2nd	2003
III	Illinois	7th	2005
III	Michigan	6th	2005
III	Indiana	3rd	2002
III	Ohio	2nd	2000
IV	Texas A&M	7th	2005
IV	Texas Tech	5th	2000
IV	Missouri	2nd	2005
IV	SMU	1st	Never
V	Colorado State	10th	2005
V	Colorado	8th	2005
V	Minnesota	5th	2004
V	Northern Iowa	2nd	2005
VI	Arizona	6th	2004
VI	Salt Lake CC	5th	1998
VI	Oregon	4th	1997
VI	UC Santa Barabara	4th	2005
VI	San Diego	2nd	2005

=== Women's championship ===
Participating teams
Region	Team	Appearance	Last Bid
I	Penn State	12th	2005
I	Boston College	1st	Never
I	Cornell	1st	Never
II	Virginia Tech	6th	2002
II	North Carolina	4th	1999
II	Virginia	3rd	2004
III	Michigan	8th	2005
III	Michigan State	4th	2004
III	Dayton	3rd	2005
IV	Texas A&M	9th	2005
IV	Texas	8th	2005
V	Colorado	12th	2005
V	Colorado State	10th	2005
VI	San Diego State	6th	2003
VI	Arizona	3rd	2005
VI	UC-Davis	1st	Never

=== Men's open ===
Region	Num	Team
I	2	UConn, Penn
II	5	Florida, JMU, Virginia, Florida State, Vanderbilt
III	0	–
IV	2	Kansas, SE Louisiana
V	4	Colorado, Iowa State, Colorado State, Minnesota State-Mankato
VI	6	Weber State, UC-Berkeley, Arizona State, UC-Santa Barbara, Cal State-Long Beach, Central Washington

=== Women's open ===
Region	Num	Team
I	4	Vermont, Penn, Rutgers, Villanova
II	4	Florida, JMU, MTSU, Vanderbilt
III	2	Purdue, Illinois
IV	2	Kansas, Texas Tech
V	4	Colorado, Northern Colorado, Iowa State, Colorado State
VI	4	UCLA, Oregon State, UC-Santa Barbara, UC-Berkeley

== Group stage ==
=== Men's championship ===
Group A
Pos	Team	Pld	W	D	L	GF	GA	GD	Pts	Qualification
1	Texas A&M	2	2	0	0	3	1	+2	6	Advanced to knockout stage
2	Minnesota	2	1	0	1	2	2	0	3	Advanced to knockout stage
3	Mississippi State	2	0	0	2	2	4	−2	0	Consolation

Scores

8:00am MST	Minnesota	2–1	Mississippi State	Field 1
Thu, November 16				Stadium: Arizona State University; Tempe, Arizona

2:00pm MST	Mississippi State	1–2	Texas A&M	Field 1
Thu, November 16				Stadium: Arizona State University; Tempe, Arizona

8:00pm MST	Texas A&M	1–0	Minnesota	Field 1
Thu, November 16				Stadium: Arizona State University; Tempe, Arizona

Group B
Pos	Team	Pld	W	D	L	GF	GA	GD	Pts	Qualification
1	UC-Santa Barbara	2	2	0	0	5	1	+4	6	Advanced to knockout stage
2	Indiana	2	1	0	1	2	3	−1	3	Advanced to knockout stage
3	Virginia Tech	2	0	0	2	0	3	−3	0	Consolation

Scores

8:00am MST	UCSB	3–1	Indiana	Field 2
Thu, November 16				Stadium: Arizona State University; Tempe, Arizona

2:00pm MST	Indiana	1–0	Virginia Tech	Field 2
Thu, November 16				Stadium: Arizona State University; Tempe, Arizona

8:00pm MST	Virginia Tech	0–2	UCSB	Field 2
Thu, November 16				Stadium: Arizona State University; Tempe, Arizona

Group C
Pos	Team	Pld	W	D	L	GF	GA	GD	Pts	Qualification
1	Oregon	2	2	0	0	7	0	+7	6	Advanced to knockout stage
2	Penn State	2	1	0	1	5	3	+2	3	Advanced to knockout stage
3	Northern Iowa	2	0	0	2	1	10	−9	0	Consolation

Scores

8:00am MST	Penn State	5–1	Northern Iowa	Field 3
Thu, November 16				Stadium: Arizona State University; Tempe, Arizona

2:00pm MST	Northern Iowa	0–5	Oregon	Field 3
Thu, November 16				Stadium: Arizona State University; Tempe, Arizona

8:00pm MST	Oregon	2–0	Penn State	Field 3
Thu, November 16				Stadium: Arizona State University; Tempe, Arizona

Group D
Pos	Team	Pld	W	D	L	GF	GA	GD	Pts	Qualification
1	Texas Tech	2	1	1	0	1	0	+1	4	Advanced to knockout stage
2	Ohio	2	1	0	1	1	1	0	3	Advanced to knockout stage
3	Cornell	2	0	1	1	0	1	−1	1	Consolation

Scores

8:00am MST	Ohio	0–1	Texas Tech	Field 4
Thu, November 16				Stadium: Arizona State University; Tempe, Arizona

2:00pm MST	Texas Tech	0–0	Cornell	Field 4
Thu, November 16				Stadium: Arizona State University; Tempe, Arizona

8:00pm MST	Cornell	0–1	Ohio	Field 4
Thu, November 16				Stadium: Arizona State University; Tempe, Arizona

Group E
Pos	Team	Pld	W	D	L	GF	GA	GD	Pts	Qualification
1	SMU	2	1	0	1	3	2	+1	3	Advanced to knockout stage
2	Salt Lake CC	2	1	0	1	2	1	+1	3	Advanced to knockout stage
3	Colorado	2	1	0	1	1	3	−2	3	Consolation

Scores

8:00am MST	SMU	0–2	SLCC	Field 5
Thu, November 16				Stadium: Arizona State University; Tempe, Arizona

2:00pm MST	SLCC	0–1	Colorado	Field 5
Thu, November 16				Stadium: Arizona State University; Tempe, Arizona

8:00pm MST	Colorado	0–3	SMU	Field 5
Thu, November 16				Stadium: Arizona State University; Tempe, Arizona

Group F
Pos	Team	Pld	W	D	L	GF	GA	GD	Pts	Qualification
1	Missouri	2	1	1	0	3	2	+1	4	Advanced to knockout stage
2	UC-San Diego	2	1	0	1	4	2	+2	3	Advanced to knockout stage
3	Auburn	2	0	1	1	1	4	−3	1	Consolation

Scores

8:00am MST	Auburn	0–3	UC-San Diego	Field 6
Thu, November 16				Stadium: Arizona State University; Tempe, Arizona

2:00pm MST	UC-San Diego	1–2	Missouri	Field 6
Thu, November 16				Stadium: Arizona State University; Tempe, Arizona

8:00pm MST	Missouri	1–1	Auburn	Field 6
Thu, November 16				Stadium: Arizona State University; Tempe, Arizona

Group G
Pos	Team	Pld	W	D	L	GF	GA	GD	Pts	Qualification
1	North Carolina	2	2	0	0	5	1	+4	6	Advanced to knockout stage
2	Michigan	2	1	0	1	1	3	−2	3	Advanced to knockout stage
3	Colorado State	2	0	0	2	1	3	−2	0	Consolation

Scores

8:00am MST	North Carolina	3–0	Michigan	Field 7
Thu, November 16				Stadium: Arizona State University; Tempe, Arizona

2:00pm MST	Michigan	1–0	Colorado State	Field 7
Thu, November 16				Stadium: Arizona State University; Tempe, Arizona

8:00pm MST	Colorado State	1–2	North Carolina	Field 7
Thu, November 16				Stadium: Arizona State University; Tempe, Arizona

Group H
Pos	Team	Pld	W	D	L	GF	GA	GD	Pts	Qualification
1	Illinois	2	1	1	0	1	0	+1	4	Advanced to knockout stage
2	Arizona	2	1	0	1	1	1	0	3	Advanced to knockout stage
3	Brown	2	0	1	1	0	1	−1	1	Consolation

Scores

8:00am MST	Arizona	1–0	Brown	Field 8
Thu, November 16				Stadium: Arizona State University; Tempe, Arizona

2:00pm MST	Brown	0–0	Illinois	Field 8
Thu, November 16				Stadium: Arizona State University; Tempe, Arizona

8:00pm MST	Illinois	1–0	Arizona	Field 8
Thu, November 16				Stadium: Arizona State University; Tempe, Arizona

=== Women's championship ===
Group A
Pos	Team	Pld	W	D	L	GF	GA	GD	Pts	Qualification
1	SDSU	3	2	0	1	8	3	+5	6	Advanced to knockout stage
2	Texas A&M	3	2	0	1	6	5	+1	6	Advanced to knockout stage
3	Michigan	3	1	1	1	1	1	0	4	
4	Penn State	3	0	1	2	2	8	−6	1	

Scores

10:00am MST	Michigan	0–0	Penn State	Field 5
Thu, November 16				Stadium: Arizona State University; Tempe, Arizona

10:00am MST	SDSU	4–1	Texas A&M	Field 6
Thu, November 16				Stadium: Arizona State University; Tempe, Arizona

4:00pm MST	Texas A&M	1–0	Michigan	Field 5
Thu, November 16				Stadium: Arizona State University; Tempe, Arizona

4:00pm MST	Penn State	1–4	SDSU	Field 6
Thu, November 16				Stadium: Arizona State University; Tempe, Arizona

8:00am MST	Michigan	1–0	SDSU	Field 5
Fri, November 17				Stadium: Arizona State University; Tempe, Arizona

8:00am MST	Texas A&M	4–1	Penn State	Field 6
Fri, November 17				Stadium: Arizona State University; Tempe, Arizona

Group B
Pos	Team	Pld	W	D	L	GF	GA	GD	Pts	Qualification
1	Arizona	3	1	2	0	5	4	+1	5	Advanced to knockout stage
2	Virginia	3	1	2	0	3	2	+1	5	Advanced to knockout stage
3	Boston College	3	1	1	1	5	5	0	4	
4	Dayton	3	0	1	2	2	4	−2	1	

Scores

10:00am MST	Dayton	1–1	Arizona	Field 7
Thu, November 16				Stadium: Arizona State University; Tempe, Arizona

10:00am MST	Virginia	1–1	Boston College	Field 1
Thu, November 16				Stadium: Arizona State University; Tempe, Arizona

6:00pm MST	Boston College	2–1	Dayton	Field 5
Thu, November 16				Stadium: Arizona State University; Tempe, Arizona

6:00pm MST	Arizona	1–1	Virginia	Field 6
Thu, November 16				Stadium: Arizona State University; Tempe, Arizona

8:00am MST	Dayton	0–1	Virginia	Field 7
Fri, November 17				Stadium: Arizona State University; Tempe, Arizona

8:00am MST	Boston College	2–3	Arizona	Field 1
Fri, November 17				Stadium: Arizona State University; Tempe, Arizona

Group C
Pos	Team	Pld	W	D	L	GF	GA	GD	Pts	Qualification
1	Colorado State	3	2	1	0	5	1	+4	7	Advanced to knockout stage
2	Michigan State	3	1	1	1	4	3	+1	4	Advanced to knockout stage
3	UC-Davis	3	1	0	2	1	3	−2	3	
4	Virginia Tech	3	1	0	2	2	5	−3	3	

Scores

12:00pm MST	Colorado State	1–1	Michigan State	Field 5
Thu, November 16				Stadium: Arizona State University; Tempe, Arizona

12:00pm MST	UC-Davis	1–0	Virginia Tech	Field 6
Thu, November 16				Stadium: Arizona State University; Tempe, Arizona

4:00pm MST	Virginia Tech	0–3	Colorado State	Field 7
Thu, November 16				Stadium: Arizona State University; Tempe, Arizona

4:00pm MST	Michigan State	2–0	UC-Davis	Field 1
Thu, November 16				Stadium: Arizona State University; Tempe, Arizona

10:00am MST	Colorado State	1–0	UC-Davis	Field 5
Fri, November 17				Stadium: Arizona State University; Tempe, Arizona

10:00am MST	Virginia Tech	2–1	Michigan State	Field 6
Fri, November 17				Stadium: Arizona State University; Tempe, Arizona

Group D
Pos	Team	Pld	W	D	L	GF	GA	GD	Pts	Qualification
1	Colorado	3	2	1	0	8	4	+4	7	Advanced to knockout stage
2	Texas	3	2	1	0	6	4	+2	7	Advanced to knockout stage
3	North Carolina	3	1	0	2	5	6	−1	3	
4	Cornell	3	0	0	3	3	8	−5	0	

Scores

12:00pm MST	Colorado	3–1	North Carolina	Field 7
Thu, November 16				Stadium: Arizona State University; Tempe, Arizona

12:00pm MST	Cornell	1–2	Texas	Field 1
Thu, November 16				Stadium: Arizona State University; Tempe, Arizona

6:00pm MST	Texas	2–2	Colorado	Field 7
Thu, November 16				Stadium: Arizona State University; Tempe, Arizona

6:00pm MST	North Carolina	3–1	Cornell	Field 1
Thu, November 16				Stadium: Arizona State University; Tempe, Arizona

10:00am MST	Colorado	3–1	Cornell	Field 7
Fri, November 17				Stadium: Arizona State University; Tempe, Arizona

10:00am MST	Texas	2–1	North Carolina	Field 1
Fri, November 17				Stadium: Arizona State University; Tempe, Arizona

=== Men's open ===
Group A
Pos	Team	Pld	W	D	L	GF	GA	GD	Pts	Qualification
1	Kansas	2	2	0	0	4	0	+5	9	Advanced to knockout stage
2	Colorado "Black"	2	1	0	1	2	3	0	6	Advanced to knockout stage
3	Weber State	2	0	0	2	1	4	−2	3	
4	No team fielded, all teams awarded 3 points and +1 GD									

Scores

10:00am MST	Weber State	1–2	Colorado	Field 1
Thu, November 16				Stadium: Arizona State University; Tempe, Arizona

4:00pm MST	Kansas	2–0	Weber State	Field 1
Thu, November 16				Stadium: Arizona State University; Tempe, Arizona

8:00am MST	Kansas	2–0	Colorado	Field 2
Fri, November 17				Stadium: Arizona State University; Tempe, Arizona

Group B
Pos	Team	Pld	W	D	L	GF	GA	GD	Pts	Qualification
1	Arizona State	3	2	0	1	7	3	+4	6	Advanced to knockout stage
2	Florida	3	2	0	1	6	2	+4	6	Advanced to knockout stage
3	UC-Berkeley	3	2	0	1	3	4	−1	6	
4	Iowa State	3	0	0	3	1	8	−7	0	

Scores

10:00am MST	UC-Berkeley	2–0	Arizona State	Field 3
Thu, November 16				Stadium: Arizona State University; Tempe, Arizona

10:00am MST	Florida	2–0	Iowa State	Field 4
Thu, November 16				Stadium: Arizona State University; Tempe, Arizona

4:00pm MST	Iowa State	0–1	UC-Berkeley	Field 3
Thu, November 16				Stadium: Arizona State University; Tempe, Arizona

4:00pm MST	Arizona State	2–0	Florida	Field 4
Thu, November 16				Stadium: Arizona State University; Tempe, Arizona

8:00am MST	UC-Berkeley	0–4	Florida	Field 3
Fri, November 17				Stadium: Arizona State University; Tempe, Arizona

8:00am MST	Iowa State	1–5	Arizona State	Field 4
Fri, November 17				Stadium: Arizona State University; Tempe, Arizona

Group C
Pos	Team	Pld	W	D	L	GF	GA	GD	Pts	Qualification
1	Virginia	3	3	0	0	7	1	+6	9	Advanced to knockout stage
2	JMU	3	1	0	2	3	4	−1	3	
3	UConn	3	1	0	2	3	5	−2	3	
4	UC-Santa Barbara "Blue"	3	1	0	2	1	4	−3	3	

Scores

12:00pm MST	UCSB	0–2	Virginia	Field 1
Thu, November 16				Stadium: Arizona State University; Tempe, Arizona

12:00pm MST	JMU	1–2	UConn	Field 2
Thu, November 16				Stadium: Arizona State University; Tempe, Arizona

6:00pm MST	UConn	0–1	UCSB	Field 1
Thu, November 16				Stadium: Arizona State University; Tempe, Arizona

6:00pm MST	Virginia	2–0	JMU	Field 2
Thu, November 16				Stadium: Arizona State University; Tempe, Arizona

10:00am MST	UCSB	0–2	JMU	Field 1
Fri, November 17				Stadium: Arizona State University; Tempe, Arizona

10:00am MST	UConn	1–3	Virginia	Field 2
Fri, November 17				Stadium: Arizona State University; Tempe, Arizona

Group D
Pos	Team	Pld	W	D	L	GF	GA	GD	Pts	Qualification
1	Florida State	3	1	2	0	5	3	+2	5	Advanced to knockout stage
2	Colorado State "B"	3	1	1	1	4	4	0	4	
3	Cal State-Long Beach	3	0	3	0	3	3	0	3	
4	Penn	3	0	2	1	2	4	−2	2	

Scores

12:00pm MST	Cal State	1–1	Colorado State	Field 3
Thu, November 16				Stadium: Arizona State University; Tempe, Arizona

12:00pm MST	Florida State	1–1	Penn	Field 4
Thu, November 16				Stadium: Arizona State University; Tempe, Arizona

6:00pm MST	Penn	0–0	Cal State	Field 3
Thu, November 16				Stadium: Arizona State University; Tempe, Arizona

6:00pm MST	Colorado State	0–2	Florida State	Field 4
Thu, November 16				Stadium: Arizona State University; Tempe, Arizona

10:00am MST	Cal State	2–2	Florida State	Field 3
Fri, November 17				Stadium: Arizona State University; Tempe, Arizona

10:00am MST	Penn	1–3	Colorado State	Field 4
Fri, November 17				Stadium: Arizona State University; Tempe, Arizona

Group E
Pos	Team	Pld	W	D	L	GF	GA	GD	Pts	Qualification
1	Minnesota State-Mankato	3	3	0	0	11	1	+10	9	Advanced to knockout stage
2	Vanderbilt	3	2	0	1	5	5	0	6	Advanced to knockout stage
3	Central Washington	3	1	0	2	3	3	0	3	
4	Southeastern Louisiana	3	0	0	3	1	11	−10	0	

Scores

10:00am MST	Central Washington	0–2	Minnesota State	Field 2
Thu, November 16				Stadium: Arizona State University; Tempe, Arizona

10:00am MST	Vanderbilt	3–1	SE Louisiana	Field 3
Thu, November 16				Stadium: Arizona State University; Tempe, Arizona

6:00pm MST	SE Louisiana	0–3	Central Washington	Field 2
Thu, November 16				Stadium: Arizona State University; Tempe, Arizona

6:00pm MST	Minnesota State	4–1	Vanderbilt	Field 3
Thu, November 16				Stadium: Arizona State University; Tempe, Arizona

10:00am MST	Central Washington	0–1	Vanderbilt	Field 2
Fri, November 17				Stadium: Arizona State University; Tempe, Arizona

10:00am MST	SE Louisiana	0–5	Minnesota State	Field 3
Fri, November 17				Stadium: Arizona State University; Tempe, Arizona

=== Women's open ===
Group A
Pos	Team	Pld	W	D	L	GF	GA	GD	Pts	Qualification
1	Colorado "Black"	3	3	0	0	7	0	+7	9	Advanced to knockout stage
2	UCLA	3	2	0	1	8	4	+3	6	
3	Purdue	3	0	1	2	2	4	−2	1	
4	Vermont	3	0	1	2	1	10	−8	1	

Scores

8:00am MST	Colorado	3–0	UCLA	Field 2
Thu, November 16				Stadium: Arizona State University; Tempe, Arizona

8:00am MST	Purdue	1–1	Vermont	Field 3
Thu, November 16				Stadium: Arizona State University; Tempe, Arizona

4:00pm MST	Vermont	0–3	Colorado	Field 2
Thu, November 16				Stadium: Arizona State University; Tempe, Arizona

4:00pm MST	UCLA	2–1	Purdue	Field 3
Thu, November 16				Stadium: Arizona State University; Tempe, Arizona

8:00am MST	Colorado	1–0	Purdue	Field 2
Fri, November 17				Stadium: Arizona State University; Tempe, Arizona

8:00am MST	Vermont	0–6	UCLA	Field 3
Fri, November 17				Stadium: Arizona State University; Tempe, Arizona

Group B
Pos	Team	Pld	W	D	L	GF	GA	GD	Pts	Qualification
1	Florida	3	3	0	0	7	1	+6	9	Advanced to knockout stage
2	Oregon State	3	1	1	1	6	5	+1	4	
3	Penn	3	1	0	2	1	5	−4	3	
4	Northern Colorado	3	0	1	2	2	5	−3	1	

Scores

8:00am MST	Penn	0–3	Oregon State	Field 4
Thu, November 16				Stadium: Arizona State University; Tempe, Arizona

8:00am MST	Northern Colorado	0–2	Florida	Field 5
Thu, November 16				Stadium: Arizona State University; Tempe, Arizona

4:00pm MST	Florida	2–0	Penn	Field 4
Thu, November 16				Stadium: Arizona State University; Tempe, Arizona

4:00pm MST	Oregon State	2–2	Northern Colorado	Field 5
Thu, November 16				Stadium: Arizona State University; Tempe, Arizona

8:00am MST	Penn	1–0	Northern Colorado	Field 4
Fri, November 17				Stadium: Arizona State University; Tempe, Arizona

8:00am MST	Florida	3–1	Oregon State	Field 5
Fri, November 17				Stadium: Arizona State University; Tempe, Arizona

Group C
Pos	Team	Pld	W	D	L	GF	GA	GD	Pts	Qualification
1	JMU	3	3	0	0	8	0	+8	9	Advanced to knockout stage
2	UC-Santa Barbara	3	2	0	1	8	3	+5	6	Advanced to knockout stage
3	Kansas	3	1	0	2	5	7	−2	3	
4	Iowa State	3	0	0	3	2	13	−11	0	

Scores

10:00am MST	Kansas	1–3	UC-Santa Barbara	Field 4
Thu, November 16				Stadium: Arizona State University; Tempe, Arizona

10:00am MST	Iowa State	0–4	JMU	Field 5
Thu, November 16				Stadium: Arizona State University; Tempe, Arizona

6:00pm MST	JMU	2–0	Kansas	Field 4
Thu, November 16				Stadium: Arizona State University; Tempe, Arizona

6:00pm MST	UC-Santa Barbara	5–0	Iowa State	Field 5
Thu, November 16				Stadium: Arizona State University; Tempe, Arizona

10:00am MST	Kansas	4–2	Iowa State	Field 4
Fri, November 17				Stadium: Arizona State University; Tempe, Arizona

10:00am MST	JMU	2–0	UC-Santa Barbara	Field 5
Fri, November 17				Stadium: Arizona State University; Tempe, Arizona

Group D
Pos	Team	Pld	W	D	L	GF	GA	GD	Pts	Qualification
1	Texas Tech	3	3	0	0	7	3	+4	9	Advanced to knockout stage
2	Illinois	3	2	0	1	12	3	+8	6	Advanced to knockout stage
3	MTSU	3	1	0	2	5	8	−3	3	
4	Rutgers	3	0	0	3	1	11	−9	0	

Scores

12:00pm MST	Illinois	6–0	Rutgers	Field 2
Thu, November 16				Stadium: Arizona State University; Tempe, Arizona

12:00pm MST	Texas Tech	3–1	MTSU	Field 3
Thu, November 16				Stadium: Arizona State University; Tempe, Arizona

8:00pm MST	MTSU	0–4	Illinois	Field 2
Thu, November 16				Stadium: Arizona State University; Tempe, Arizona

8:00pm MST	Rutgers	0–1	Texas Tech	Field 3
Thu, November 16				Stadium: Arizona State University; Tempe, Arizona

12:00pm MST	Illinois	2–3	Texas Tech	Field 2
Fri, November 17				Stadium: Arizona State University; Tempe, Arizona

12:00pm MST	MTSU	4–1	Rutgers	Field 3
Fri, November 17				Stadium: Arizona State University; Tempe, Arizona

Group E
Pos	Team	Pld	W	D	L	GF	GA	GD	Pts	Qualification
1	Villanova	3	2	1	0	7	0	+7	7	Advanced to knockout stage
2	UC-Berkeley	3	2	1	0	5	0	+5	7	Advanced to knockout stage
3	Colorado State "Green"	3	1	0	2	1	6	−5	3	
4	Vanderbilt	3	0	0	3	0	7	−7	0	

Scores

12:00pm MST	Villanova	0–0	UC-Berkeley	Field 4
Thu, November 16				Stadium: Arizona State University; Tempe, Arizona

12:00pm MST	Colorado State	1–0	Vanderbilt	Field 5
Thu, November 16				Stadium: Arizona State University; Tempe, Arizona

8:00pm MST	Vanderbilt	0–4	Villanova	Field 4
Thu, November 16				Stadium: Arizona State University; Tempe, Arizona

8:00pm MST	UC-Berkeley	3–0	Colorado State	Field 5
Thu, November 16				Stadium: Arizona State University; Tempe, Arizona

12:00pm MST	Villanova	3–0	Colorado State	Field 4
Fri, November 17				Stadium: Arizona State University; Tempe, Arizona

12:00pm MST	Vanderbilt	0–2	UC-Berkeley	Field 5
Fri, November 17				Stadium: Arizona State University; Tempe, Arizona

== Tournament bracket ==
=== Men's championship ===
Sweet 16
Fri • 12:00pm • Field 1
Texas A&M	0
Ohio (pen.)	1
Fri • 12:00pm • Field 2
Salt Lake CC	0
Illinois	1
Fri • 12:00pm • Field 3
North Carolina	1
UC-San Diego (pen.)	2
Fri • 12:00pm • Field 4
Penn State	0
UC-Santa Barbara	1
Fri • 12:00pm • Field 5
Oregon	0
Indiana	1
Fri • 12:00pm • Field 6
Michigan	3
Missouri	0
Fri • 12:00pm • Field 7
SMU	0
Arizona	2
Fri • 12:00pm • Field 8
Minnesota	1
Texas Tech	2

Quarterfinals
Fri • 8:00pm • Field 1
Ohio	1 (4)
Illinois (pen.)	1 (5)
Fri • 8:00pm • Field 2
UC-San Diego	3
UC-Santa Barbara	0
Fri • 8:00pm • Field 3
Indiana	0
Michigan	2
Fri • 8:00pm • Field 4
Arizona (pen.)	0 (3)
Texas Tech	0 (2)

Semifinals
Sat • 10:00am • Field 4
Illinois	3
UC-San Diego	1
Sat • 10:00am • Field 5
Michigan	1
Arizona	0

Final
Sat • 5:00pm • Field 3
Illinois	0
Michigan	1

==== Men's consolation ====
Quarterfinals
Fri • 6:00pm • Field 7
Mississippi State	0
Colorado	3
Fri • 8:00pm • Field 5
Auburn	1
Virginia Tech	0
Fri • 8:00pm • Field 6
Northern Iowa	0
Colorado State	3
Fri • 8:00pm • Field 7
Brown	2
Cornell	0

Semifinals
Sat • 8:00am • Field 6
Colorado	2
Auburn	0
Sat • 8:00am • Field 7
Colorado State	1
Brown (pen.)	2

Final
Sat • 1:00pm • Field 7
Colorado	2
Brown	3

=== Women's championship ===
Quarterfinals
Fri • 4:00pm • Field 5
San Diego State	2
Texas	0
Fri • 4:00pm • Field 6
Arizona	1
Michigan State	2
Fri • 6:00pm • Field 5
Colorado State	0
Virginia (pen.)	1
Fri • 6:00pm • Field 6
Colorado (pen.)	1
Texas A&M	0

Semifinals
Sat • 10:00am • Field 1
San Diego State	1
Michigan State	0
Sat • 10:00am • Field 2
Virginia	0
Colorado	2

Final
Sat • 3:00pm • Field 3
San Diego State	2
Colorado	1

=== Men's open ===
Quarterfinals
Fri • 4:00pm • Field 1
Virginia (pen.)	2
Florida	1
Fri • 4:00pm • Field 2
Minnesota-Mankato	1
Kansas	2
Fri • 6:00pm • Field 1
Arizona State	4
Vanderbilt	0
Fri • 6:00pm • Field 2
Colorado "Black"	1
Florida State	0

Semifinals
Sat • 8:00am • Field 4
Virginia	0
Kansas	1
Sat • 8:00am • Field 5
Arizona State	1
Colorado "Black"	0

Final
Sat • 1:00pm • Field 5
Kansas	1
Arizona State	3

=== Women's open ===
Quarterfinals
Fri • 4:00pm • Field 3
Colorado "Black" (pen.)	4
UC-Berkeley	3
Fri • 4:00pm • Field 4
Texas Tech	0
JMU	1
Fri • 6:00pm • Field 3
Villanova	0
Illinois	2
Fri • 6:00pm • Field 4
UC-Santa Barbara	3
Florida	0

Semifinals
Sat • 8:00am • Field 1
Colorado "Black" (pen.)	1
JMU	0
Sat • 8:00am • Field 2
Illinois	0
UC-Santa Barbara	2

Final
Sat • 1:00pm • Field 6
Colorado "Black"	0
UC-Santa Barbara	3

== All tournament teams ==
Key
MVP
Best goalkeeper

=== Men's championship ===
Name	Team
Brent Medema	Michigan
Brian Summerville	Illinois
Ryan Ward	Arizona
Gari Martinouski	Michigan
Nima Hakim	Texas Tech
TJ King	Illinois
Juan Chico Macklis	San Diego
Tom McCurdy	Michigan
Omio Aldaghi	Arizona
Daue Brown	Illinois
Julian Moura-Busquets	Ohio
Daniel Minkoff	San Diego

=== Women's championship ===
Name	Team
Cassidy Runyan	San Diego State
Lindsey Young	San Diego State
Liz Cross	Texas
Kristin Good	Texas A&M
Lauren Nuffer	Virginia
Ashley Omphroy	San Diego State
Catie Chase	Colorado
Rosie Cobion	San Diego State
Katie Rohn	Michigan State
Lindsay Brown	Colorado
Jenna Mitchell	San Diego State
Breanah Glynn	Colorado

=== Men's open ===
Name	Team
Justin Klum	Arizona State
Justin Klum	Arizona State
Devin Scherer	Arizona State
Shawn Bryant	Arizona State
Joe Rhodes	Arizona State
CJ Lipinski	Kansas
Marcus Rivera	Kansasa
Harry Byrd	Virginia
David Newman	Virginia
Evren Onat	Colorado
Mike Scanlon	Florida
Brandon Schlichter	Minnesota State
Peter Matthews	Virginia

=== Women's open ===
Name	Team
Morgan Tanner	UC-Santa Barbara
Jessica Keller	Colorado "Black"
Meredith Stark	Florida
Lauren Floyd	Illinois
Chelsea Curry	JMU
Karen Kiazek	Colorado "Black"
Heather Allison	Colorado "Black"
Megan Henning	Colorado "Black"
Carly Allen	UC-Santa Barbara
Carrie Petro	UC-Santa Barbara
Kate Whitaker	UC-Santa Barbara
Hannah Sasson	UC-Santa Barbara
