= 2005 NIRSA National Soccer Championship =

- League: NIRSA
- Sport: Soccer
- Site: University of Alabama; Tuscaloosa, Alabama
- Duration: November 17–19, 2005
- Teams: 24 (Men's championship); 16 (Women's championship); 16 (Men's open); 16 (Women's open)
- Results: Official Results

Men's Championship Division
- Score: 2–1 (a.e.t.)
- Champion: Colorado (1st title, 1st title game)
- Runners-up: Vanderbilt (1st title game)
- Season MVP: Chris Brosz (Colorado)

Women's Championship Division
- Score: 2–1 (a.e.t.)
- Champion: Michigan (4th title, 5th title game)
- Runners-up: Colorado (3rd title game)
- Season MVP: Katie Miller (Michigan)

Men's Open Division
- Score: 2–0
- Champion: Oregon (1st title, 2nd title game)
- Runners-up: UC Berkeley (1st title game)
- Season MVP: Brian Mikalaitis (Oregon)

Women's Open Division
- Score: 1–0
- Champion: Virginia (2nd title, 2nd title game)
- Runners-up: Virginia Tech (2nd title game)
- Top seed: Lauren Nuffer (Virginia)

NIRSA national soccer championships seasons
- ← 2004 2006 →

The 2005 NIRSA national soccer championship, also referred to as the NIRSA Collegiate Soccer Sport Club championship, was the 12th NIRSA National Soccer Championships, the annual national championships for United States-based, collegiate club soccer teams organized by NIRSA. It took place at the University of Alabama in Tuscaloosa, Alabama from Thursday, November 17 to Saturday, November 19, 2005.

== Overview ==
This tournament marked the first year back following the initial cancellation of the previous tournament with only the men's championship declaring a winner in a rescheduled event.

=== Men's championship ===
In finals, two teams would make their finals debuts in Colorado and Vanderbilt. Prior to this, both teams were coming off quarterfinals defeats the previous tournament. In the group stage, Colorado beat Dayton 4–1 in their opener then defeat UTEP 3–1 to top their group. Meanwhile, Vanderbilt would beat 1994 champions, Purdue, 1–0 then beat 2000 champions, Penn State, 1–0 to also top their group.

In the knockout round, Colorado would beat Missouri 4–1 in the sweet 16 then would beat Penn State 2–0 in the quarterfinals while Vanderbilt would beat Northern Iowa 5–0 in the sweet 16, then concede their first goal of the tournament in a 3–1 win over Dayton. In the first semifinals for both teams, Colorado would defeat reigning champions, Texas A&M, 3–1 while Vanderbilt would beat 2002 champions and regional champions, Weber State, 3–1 to advance to their first finals.

In the finals, Vanderbilt would concede a penalty in the first half that Eric Bjork of Colorado would score to give Colorado a 1–0 lead. Colorado would hold this lead until eventual all-tournament member Nick Van Buecken would inadvertently handle the ball in his own box in the final minute of regulation to give Vanderbilt a penalty that they would convert tying the game at 1–1 and force the game to go into two ten-minute sudden victory overtime periods. In overtime, Nick Van Buecken would make-up for his previous mistake when he assisted eventual tournament MVP Chris Brosz with a cross into the box in overtime. The game would instantly end with this goal, giving Colorado their first national championship in overtime.

=== Women's championship ===
In the finals, two of the previous year's co-champions, Colorado State and Michigan, were both looking to claim their 4th national title and join Colorado as the team with the most titles at 4. In the group stage, both teams would struggle and finish second in their group. Colorado State would lose their opener to a fellow reigning co-champion UC-Santa Barbara 1–2 then would win their second match against Texas A&M 2–1 and finally, a 1–1 tie against Illinois would be enough to advance to the quarterfinals. Meanwhile, Michigan would win their opener 2–1 against Delaware, then would lose to eventual group winners Texas 1–0, and finally would win their finale against UCLA 1–0.

In the knockout round, Colorado State would win their quarterfinal match against Florida 2–1 then would win their semifinal matchup against Texas 4–0. Meanwhile, Michigan would beat Arizona 2–1 in the quarterfinals then would face fellow reigning co-champion Colorado. Following a 1–1 draw and a scoreless overtime, penalties would be required to determine the winner. In the shootout, senior captain for Michigan, Bre Bennett saved all three of Colorado's attempts, meaning the three makes for Michigan would be enough to advance to the finals. In the finals, Colorado would score first but junior captain Dana Restrick tied the game at 1–1 with six minutes to play. The game would remain tied 1–1 at the end of regulation meaning two ten-minute sudden victory overtime periods would be required to determine a winner. In overtime, freshman striker, Katie Miller of Michigan, would score immediately ending the game at 2–1 and giving Michigan their fourth national title. Following this, Katie Miller would be named the tournament's MVP and eventually would make Michigan's varsity roster following a February 2006 tryout, becoming the team's first player that originated from the club team.

=== Men's open ===
In the finals, 2000 men's open finalist, Oregon, were looking to claim their first national title against men's open finals debutants UC-Berkeley. Both teams would win all three group stage games with Oregon beating SE Louisiana 2–0, UW-Eau Claire 4–0, then finally Georgia Tech 2–0 while UC-Berkeley would beat UW-Stout 2–0, Georgia Southern 3–1, then North Dakota State 2–0. In the quarterfinals, Oregon would beat Georgia Southern 2–0 and UC-Berkeley would beat Georgia Tech 4–3 in overtime. In the semifinals, Oregon would beat Arizona 5–1 while UC-Berkeley would beat Alabama 3–2. In the finals, Oregon would win 2–0 and claim their first national title. Oregon's Brian Mikalaitis would be named tournament MVP.

=== Women's open ===
In the finals, 2000 women's open championship, Virginia, would face in-state rival and 1997 women's open champion, Virginia Tech. In the group stage, despite winning their second match against Miami 1–0 and their finale against Colorado State's "Green" team 3–1, Virginia would finish second in their group due to a 3–3 draw in their opener and a lost coin flip to group winners Cornell. Meanwhile, Virginia Tech would be in one of the three groups that only had 3 teams and would finish with 9 points following a 2–0 win over Virginia Tech and a 1–0 win over Colorado's "Black" team. In the quarterfinals, Virginia would beat 2003's open division finalist Kansas 2–1 while Virginia Tech would beat Iowa State 1–0. In the semifinals, Virginia would beat Colorado's "Black" team 2–0 while Virginia Tech would beat Cornell 2–1. In the finals, Virginia would score the lone goal in a 1–0 win over Virginia Tech to claim their second open title, the first women's team to do so. Virginia's Lauren Nuffer would be named tournament MVP.

== Format ==
The competition consisted of 72 teams: 40 championship teams and 32 open teams. The divisions were further divided into a men's and women's division: 24 men's and 16 women's teams in the championship division as well as 16 men's and 16 women's teams in the open division. The divisions were then further divided into groups: eight groups of three teams in the men's championship then four teams of four teams in the remaining 3 divisions.

All four divisions engaged in a round-robin tournament that determined teams able to advance to a knockout stage. Each team played every other team in their group once in pool play which consisted of two 40-minute halves separated by a seven-minute halftime and utilized the three points for a win system. After pool play, the two highest ranked teams from each group advanced to their respective knockout stage, with the third placed team in the men's championship advancing to a consolation bracket while the third and fourth placed teams in the other divisions were eliminated.

Tie-breaking criteria for group play
The ranking of teams in each group was based on the following criteria in order:
1. Highest number of points
2. Winner of head-to-head competition
3. Greatest goal difference
4. Most goals scored

In a tie breaking scenario involving more than 2 teams, the tiebreaker procedure would begin. If one team is identified as different and both remaining teams are still tied, the tie breaker procedure is restarted.

If a tie still remained after the first 4 criteria, the following was used to break a tie:

1. NCAA kicks from the mark
  - If there was a three-way tie, a coin-flip would be conducted. The two teams that chose the same outcome would compete in kicks from the mark between each other. The winner would compete with the last remaining team in kicks from the mark
  - If there's a four-way tie, a drawing of lots would be conducted (only could occur in open division)

Knockout stage games also consisted of two 40-minute halves with the round of 16 and quarterfinals separated by a seven-minute halftime and the semifinals and finals had a ten-minute halftime. Knockout stage games needed to declare a winner, therefore if a game was tied at the end of regulation in the round of sixteen or quarterfinals, no more than two five-minute sudden victory overtime periods would be played, while in the semifinals and finals, no more than two ten-minute sudden victory overtime periods would be played. Teams would change ends after the conclusion of the first overtime period. If still tied after overtime, kicks from the mark would determine the winner.

== Qualification and selections ==
Each of the six regions received three automatic bids for the Men's Championship Division and two automatic bids for the Women's Championship Division. The final 6 bids for the Men's Championship Division and final 4 bids for the Women's Championship were given out by NIRSA to teams, typically based on their regional tournament results and RPI.

The remaining teams participated in the open division, chosen on a first-come first-serve basis via online registration beginning on September 6, 2005, with a max of 16 teams per gender division.

=== Men's championship ===
Participating teams
| Region | Team | Appearance | Last Bid |
|---|---|---|---|
| I | Cornell | 6th | 2004 |
| I | Penn State | 6th | 2001 |
| I | Delaware | 4th | 2004 |
| I | Penn | 2nd | 2004 |
| II | North Carolina | 5th | 2004 |
| II | Vanderbilt | 3rd | 2004 |
| II | Virginia | 3rd | 2003 |
| II | Virginia Tech | 3rd | 2000 |
| III | Purdue | 7th | 2003 |
| III | Illinois | 6th | 2003 |
| III | Michigan | 5th | 2003 |
| III | Dayton | 2nd | 2004 |
| IV | Texas | 10th | 2004 |
| IV | Texas A&M | 6th | 2004 |
| IV | Missouri | 1st | Never |
| IV | North Texas | 1st | Never |
| IV | UTEP | 1st | Never |
| V | Colorado State | 9th | 2004 |
| V | Colorado | 7th | 2004 |
| V | Northern Iowa | 1st | Never |
| VI | Weber State | 7th | 2004 |
| VI | Utah Valley State | 4th | 2004 |
| VI | UC Santa Barabara | 3rd | 2004 |
| VI | San Diego | 1st | Never |

=== Women's championship ===
Participating teams
| Region | Team | Appearance | Last Bid |
|---|---|---|---|
| I | Penn State | 11th | 2004 |
| I | Delaware | 5th | 2004 |
| II | JMU | 9th | 2004 |
| II | Florida | 6th | 2004 |
| III | Michigan | 7th | 2004 |
| III | Purdue | 7th | 2003 |
| III | Illinois | 6th | 2001 |
| III | Dayton | 2nd | 1997 |
| IV | Texas A&M | 8th | 2004 |
| IV | Texas | 7th | 2003 |
| IV | Rutgers | 1st | Never |
| V | Colorado | 11th | 2004 |
| V | Colorado State | 9th | 2004 |
| VI | UC-Santa Barbara | 6th | 2004 |
| VI | Arizona | 2nd | 2001 |
| VI | UCLA | 1st | Never |

=== Men's open ===
| Region | Num | Team |
|---|---|---|
| I | 1 | UConn |
| II | 5 | Alabama, UCF, Florida State, Georgia Southern, Georgia Tech |
| III | 2 | UW-Eau Claire, UW-Stout |
| IV | 2 | UL-Lafayette, Southeastern Louisiana |
| V | 2 | Colorado, North Dakota State |
| VI | 4 | Arizona, Arizona State, UC-Berkeley, Oregon |

=== Women's open ===
| Region | Num | Team |
|---|---|---|
| I | 1 | Cornell |
| II | 5 | UCF, MTSU, Vanderbilt, Virginia, Virginia Tech |
| III | 2 | Miami (OH), Michigan State |
| IV | 4 | LSU, Iowa State, Kansas, Texas Tech |
| V | 2 | Colorado, Colorado State |
| VI | 2 | UC-Berkeley, San Diego State |

== Group stage ==
=== Men's championship ===
Group A
| Pos | Team | Pld | W | D | L | GF | GA | GD | Pts | Qualification |
|---|---|---|---|---|---|---|---|---|---|---|
| 1 | Colorado | 2 | 2 | 0 | 0 | 7 | 2 | +5 | 6 | Advanced to knockout stage |
| 2 | Dayton | 2 | 1 | 0 | 1 | 3 | 4 | −1 | 3 | Advanced to knockout stage |
| 3 | Texas-El Paso | 2 | 0 | 0 | 2 | 1 | 5 | −4 | 0 | Consolation |

Scores

| 8:00am CST | Colorado | 4–1 | Dayton | Field 1 |
| Thu, November 17 | | Report | | Stadium: University of Alabama; Tuscaloosa, Alabama |

| 2:00pm CST | Dayton | 2–0 | Texas-El Paso | Field 1 |
| Thu, November 17 | | Report | | Stadium: University of Alabama; Tuscaloosa, Alabama |

| 8:00pm CST | Texas-El Paso | 1–3 | Colorado | Field 1 |
| Thu, November 17 | | Report | | Stadium: University of Alabama; Tuscaloosa, Alabama |

Group B
| Pos | Team | Pld | W | D | L | GF | GA | GD | Pts | Qualification |
|---|---|---|---|---|---|---|---|---|---|---|
| 1 | Illinois | 2 | 1 | 1 | 0 | 2 | 0 | +2 | 4 | Advanced to knockout stage |
| 2 | UC-Santa Barbara | 2 | 1 | 0 | 1 | 1 | 2 | −1 | 3 | Advanced to knockout stage |
| 3 | North Carolina | 2 | 0 | 1 | 1 | 0 | 1 | −1 | 1 | Consolation |

Scores

| 8:00am CST | Illinois | 0–0 | North Carolina | Field 2 |
| Thu, November 17 | | Report | | Stadium: University of Alabama; Tuscaloosa, Alabama |

| 2:00pm CST | North Carolina | 0–1 | UC-Santa Barbara | Field 2 |
| Thu, November 17 | | Report | | Stadium: University of Alabama; Tuscaloosa, Alabama |

| 8:00pm CST | UC-Santa Barbara | 0–2 | Illinois | Field 2 |
| Thu, November 17 | | Report | | Stadium: University of Alabama; Tuscaloosa, Alabama |

Group C
| Pos | Team | Pld | W | D | L | GF | GA | GD | Pts | Qualification |
|---|---|---|---|---|---|---|---|---|---|---|
| 1 | Weber State | 2 | 1 | 0 | 1 | 6 | 4 | +2 | 3 | Advanced to knockout stage |
| 2 | North Texas | 2 | 1 | 0 | 1 | 9 | 9 | 0 | 3 | Advanced to knockout stage |
| 3 | Virginia | 2 | 1 | 0 | 1 | 4 | 6 | −2 | 3 | Consolation |

Scores

| 8:00am CST | Weber State | 6–3 | North Texas | Field 5 |
| Thu, November 17 | | Report | | Stadium: University of Alabama; Tuscaloosa, Alabama |

| 2:00pm CST | North Texas | 6–3 | Virginia | Field 5 |
| Thu, November 17 | | Report | | Stadium: University of Alabama; Tuscaloosa, Alabama |

| 8:00pm CST | Virginia | 1–0 | Weber State | Field 5 |
| Thu, November 17 | | Report | | Stadium: University of Alabama; Tuscaloosa, Alabama |

Group D
| Pos | Team | Pld | W | D | L | GF | GA | GD | Pts | Qualification |
|---|---|---|---|---|---|---|---|---|---|---|
| 1 | Texas | 2 | 1 | 1 | 0 | 4 | 3 | +1 | 4 | Advanced to knockout stage |
| 2 | Missouri | 2 | 1 | 0 | 1 | 5 | 4 | +1 | 3 | Advanced to knockout stage |
| 3 | Delaware | 2 | 0 | 1 | 1 | 2 | 4 | −2 | 1 | Consolation |

Scores

| 8:00am CST | Texas | 3–2 | Missouri | Field 6 |
| Thu, November 17 | | Report | | Stadium: University of Alabama; Tuscaloosa, Alabama |

| 2:00pm CST | Missouri | 3–1 | Delaware | Field 6 |
| Thu, November 17 | | Report | | Stadium: University of Alabama; Tuscaloosa, Alabama |

| 8:00pm CST | Delaware | 1–1 | Texas | Field 6 |
| Thu, November 17 | | Report | | Stadium: University of Alabama; Tuscaloosa, Alabama |

Group E
| Pos | Team | Pld | W | D | L | GF | GA | GD | Pts | Qualification |
|---|---|---|---|---|---|---|---|---|---|---|
| 1 | Vanderbilt | 2 | 2 | 0 | 0 | 2 | 0 | +2 | 6 | Advanced to knockout stage |
| 2 | Penn State | 2 | 0 | 1 | 1 | 2 | 3 | −1 | 1 | Advanced to knockout stage |
| 3 | Purdue | 2 | 0 | 1 | 1 | 2 | 3 | −1 | 1 | Consolation |

Scores

| 8:00am CST | Vanderbilt | 1–0 | Purdue | Field 7 |
| Thu, November 17 | | Report | | Stadium: University of Alabama; Tuscaloosa, Alabama |

| 2:00pm CST | Purdue | 2–2 | Penn State | Field 7 |
| Thu, November 17 | | Report | | Stadium: University of Alabama; Tuscaloosa, Alabama |

| 8:00pm CST | Penn State | 0–1 | Vanderbilt | Field 7 |
| Thu, November 17 | | Report | | Stadium: University of Alabama; Tuscaloosa, Alabama |

Group F
| Pos | Team | Pld | W | D | L | GF | GA | GD | Pts | Qualification |
|---|---|---|---|---|---|---|---|---|---|---|
| 1 | San Diego | 2 | 1 | 1 | 0 | 3 | 2 | +1 | 4 | Advanced to knockout stage |
| 2 | Colorado State | 2 | 1 | 0 | 1 | 3 | 3 | 0 | 3 | Advanced to knockout stage |
| 3 | Penn | 2 | 0 | 1 | 1 | 2 | 3 | −1 | 1 | Consolation |

Scores

| 8:00am CST | Colorado State | 1–2 | San Diego | Field 8 |
| Thu, November 17 | | Report | | Stadium: University of Alabama; Tuscaloosa, Alabama |

| 2:00pm CST | San Diego | 1–1 | Penn | Field 8 |
| Thu, November 17 | | Report | | Stadium: University of Alabama; Tuscaloosa, Alabama |

| 8:00pm CST | Penn | 1–2 | Colorado State | Field 8 |
| Thu, November 17 | | Report | | Stadium: University of Alabama; Tuscaloosa, Alabama |

Group G
| Pos | Team | Pld | W | D | L | GF | GA | GD | Pts | Qualification |
|---|---|---|---|---|---|---|---|---|---|---|
| 1 | Texas A&M | 2 | 2 | 0 | 0 | 5 | 0 | +5 | 6 | Advanced to knockout stage |
| 2 | Michigan | 2 | 1 | 0 | 1 | 4 | 1 | +3 | 3 | Advanced to knockout stage |
| 3 | Virginia Tech | 2 | 0 | 0 | 2 | 0 | 8 | −8 | 0 | Consolation |

Scores

| 8:00am CST | Michigan | 4–0 | Virginia Tech | Field 9 |
| Thu, November 17 | | Report | | Stadium: University of Alabama; Tuscaloosa, Alabama |

| 2:00pm CST | Virginia Tech | 0–4 | Texas A&M | Field 9 |
| Thu, November 17 | | Report | | Stadium: University of Alabama; Tuscaloosa, Alabama |

| 8:00pm CST | Texas A&M | 1–0 | Michigan | Field 9 |
| Thu, November 17 | | Report | | Stadium: University of Alabama; Tuscaloosa, Alabama |

Group H
| Pos | Team | Pld | W | D | L | GF | GA | GD | Pts | Qualification |
|---|---|---|---|---|---|---|---|---|---|---|
| 1 | Utah Valley State | 2 | 1 | 1 | 0 | 5 | 2 | +3 | 4 | Advanced to knockout stage |
| 2 | Northern Iowa | 2 | 1 | 1 | 0 | 3 | 2 | +1 | 4 | Advanced to knockout stage |
| 3 | Cornell | 2 | 0 | 0 | 2 | 0 | 4 | −4 | 0 | Consolation |

Scores

| 8:00am CST | Utah Valley State | 2–2 | Northern Iowa | Field 10 |
| Thu, November 17 | | Report | | Stadium: University of Alabama; Tuscaloosa, Alabama |

| 2:00pm CST | Northern Iowa | 1–0 | Cornell | Field 10 |
| Thu, November 17 | | Report | | Stadium: University of Alabama; Tuscaloosa, Alabama |

| 8:00pm CST | Cornell | 0–3 | Utah Valley State | Field 10 |
| Thu, November 17 | | Report | | Stadium: University of Alabama; Tuscaloosa, Alabama |

=== Women's championship ===
Group A
| Pos | Team | Pld | W | D | L | GF | GA | GD | Pts | Qualification |
|---|---|---|---|---|---|---|---|---|---|---|
| 1 | Florida | 3 | 3 | 0 | 0 | 6 | 0 | +6 | 9 | Advanced to knockout stage |
| 2 | Colorado | 3 | 2 | 0 | 1 | 5 | 2 | +3 | 6 | Advanced to knockout stage |
| 3 | Dayton | 3 | 1 | 0 | 2 | 3 | 8 | −5 | 3 | |
| 4 | Rutgers | 3 | 0 | 0 | 3 | 3 | 7 | −4 | 0 | |

Scores

| 10:00am CST | Colorado | 3–0 | Dayton | Field 5 |
| Thu, November 17 | | Report | | Stadium: University of Alabama; Tuscaloosa, AL |

| 10:00am CST | Florida | 2–0 | Rutgers | Field 6 |
| Thu, November 17 | | Report | | Stadium: University of Alabama; Tuscaloosa, AL |

| 4:00pm CST | Rutgers | 1–2 | Colorado | Field 5 |
| Thu, November 17 | | Report | | Stadium: University of Alabama; Tuscaloosa, AL |

| 4:00pm CST | Dayton | 0–3 | Florida | Field 6 |
| Thu, November 17 | | Report | | Stadium: University of Alabama; Tuscaloosa, AL |

| 8:00am CST | Colorado | 0–1 | Florida | Field 1 |
| Fri, November 18 | | Report | | Stadium: University of Alabama; Tuscaloosa, AL |

| 8:00am CST | Rutgers | 2–3 | Dayton | Field 2 |
| Fri, November 18 | | Report | | Stadium: University of Alabama; Tuscaloosa, AL |

Group B
| Pos | Team | Pld | W | D | L | GF | GA | GD | Pts | Qualification |
|---|---|---|---|---|---|---|---|---|---|---|
| 1 | UC Santa Barabara | 3 | 3 | 0 | 0 | 9 | 1 | +8 | 9 | Advanced to knockout stage |
| 2 | Colorado State | 3 | 1 | 1 | 1 | 4 | 4 | 0 | 4 | Advanced to knockout stage |
| 3 | Texas A&M | 3 | 1 | 0 | 2 | 2 | 4 | −2 | 3 | |
| 4 | Illinois | 3 | 0 | 1 | 2 | 1 | 7 | −6 | 1 | |

Scores

| 12:00pm CST | Colorado State | 1–2 | UC-Santa Barbara | Field 1 |
| Thu, November 17 | | Report | | Stadium: University of Alabama; Tuscaloosa, AL |

| 12:00pm CST | Illinois | 0–1 | Texas A&M | Field 2 |
| Thu, November 17 | | Report | | Stadium: University of Alabama; Tuscaloosa, AL |

| 6:00pm CST | Texas A&M | 1–2 | Colorado State | Field 1 |
| Thu, November 17 | | Report | | Stadium: University of Alabama; Tuscaloosa, AL |

| 6:00pm CST | UC-Santa Barbara | 5–0 | Illinois | Field 2 |
| Thu, November 17 | | Report | | Stadium: University of Alabama; Tuscaloosa, AL |

| 8:00am CST | Colorado State | 1–1 | Illinois | Field 3 |
| Fri, November 18 | | Report | | Stadium: University of Alabama; Tuscaloosa, AL |

| 8:00am CST | Texas A&M | 0–2 | UC-Santa Barbara | Field 4 |
| Fri, November 18 | | Report | | Stadium: University of Alabama; Tuscaloosa, AL |

Group C
| Pos | Team | Pld | W | D | L | GF | GA | GD | Pts | Qualification |
|---|---|---|---|---|---|---|---|---|---|---|
| 1 | Arizona | 3 | 2 | 1 | 0 | 6 | 2 | +4 | 7 | Advanced to knockout stage |
| 2 | Penn State | 3 | 2 | 0 | 1 | 4 | 5 | −1 | 6 | Advanced to knockout stage |
| 3 | JMU | 3 | 0 | 2 | 1 | 5 | 6 | −1 | 2 | |
| 4 | Purdue | 3 | 0 | 1 | 2 | 3 | 5 | −2 | 1 | |

Scores

| 12:00pm CST | JMU | 2–2 | Purdue | Field 5 |
| Thu, November 17 | | Report | | Stadium: University of Alabama; Tuscaloosa, AL |

| 12:00pm CST | Penn State | 0–3 | Arizona | Field 6 |
| Thu, November 17 | | Report | | Stadium: University of Alabama; Tuscaloosa, AL |

| 6:00pm CST | Arizona | 2–2 | JMU | Field 5 |
| Thu, November 17 | | Report | | Stadium: University of Alabama; Tuscaloosa, AL |

| 6:00pm CST | Purdue | 1–2 | Penn State | Field 6 |
| Thu, November 17 | | Report | | Stadium: University of Alabama; Tuscaloosa, AL |

| 8:00am CST | JMU | 1–2 | Penn State | Field 5 |
| Fri, November 18 | | Report | | Stadium: University of Alabama; Tuscaloosa, AL |

| 8:00am CST | Arizona | 1–0 | Purdue | Field 6 |
| Fri, November 18 | | Report | | Stadium: University of Alabama; Tuscaloosa, AL |

Group D
| Pos | Team | Pld | W | D | L | GF | GA | GD | Pts | Qualification |
|---|---|---|---|---|---|---|---|---|---|---|
| 1 | Texas | 3 | 2 | 0 | 1 | 3 | 2 | +1 | 6 | Advanced to knockout stage |
| 2 | Michigan | 3 | 2 | 0 | 1 | 3 | 2 | +1 | 6 | Advanced to knockout stage |
| 3 | UCLA | 3 | 1 | 0 | 2 | 4 | 6 | −2 | 3 | |
| 4 | Delaware | 3 | 1 | 0 | 2 | 6 | 6 | 0 | 3 | |

Scores

| 12:00pm CST | Michigan | 2–1 | Delaware | Field 7 |
| Thu, November 17 | | Report | | Stadium: University of Alabama; Tuscaloosa, AL |

| 12:00pm CST | UCLA | 0–2 | Texas | Field 8 |
| Thu, November 17 | | Report | | Stadium: University of Alabama; Tuscaloosa, AL |

| 6:00pm CST | Texas | 1–0 | Michigan | Field 7 |
| Thu, November 17 | | Report | | Stadium: University of Alabama; Tuscaloosa, AL |

| 6:00pm CST | Delaware | 3–4 | UCLA | Field 8 |
| Thu, November 17 | | Report | | Stadium: University of Alabama; Tuscaloosa, AL |

| 10:00am CST | Michigan | 1–0 | UCLA | Field 1 |
| Fri, November 18 | | Report | | Stadium: University of Alabama; Tuscaloosa, AL |

| 10:00am CST | Texas | 0–2 | Delaware | Field 2 |
| Fri, November 18 | | Report | | Stadium: University of Alabama; Tuscaloosa, AL |

=== Men's open ===
Group A
| Pos | Team | Pld | W | D | L | GF | GA | GD | Pts | Qualification |
|---|---|---|---|---|---|---|---|---|---|---|
| 1 | Arizona | 3 | 2 | 1 | 0 | 5 | 1 | +4 | 7 | Advanced to knockout stage |
| 2 | Alabama | 3 | 1 | 1 | 1 | 4 | 4 | 0 | 4 | Advanced to knockout stage |
| 3 | UCF | 3 | 1 | 1 | 1 | 4 | 3 | +1 | 4 | |
| 4 | Louisiana | 3 | 0 | 1 | 2 | 2 | 7 | −5 | 1 | |

Scores

| 10:00am CST | UCF | 3–0 | Louisiana | Field 7 |
| Thu, November 17 | | Report | | Stadium: University of Alabama; Tuscaloosa, AL |

| 10:00am CST | Alabama | 0–2 | Arizona | Field 8 |
| Thu, November 17 | | Report | | Stadium: University of Alabama; Tuscaloosa, AL |

| 4:00pm CST | Arizona | 1–1 | UCF | Field 7 |
| Thu, November 17 | | Report | | Stadium: University of Alabama; Tuscaloosa, AL |

| 4:00pm CST | Louisiana | 2–2 | Alabama | Field 8 |
| Thu, November 17 | | Report | | Stadium: University of Alabama; Tuscaloosa, AL |

| 10:00am CST | UCF | 0–2 | Alabama | Field 6 |
| Fri, November 18 | | Report | | Stadium: University of Alabama; Tuscaloosa, AL |

| 10:00am CST | Arizona | 2–0 | Louisiana | Field 7 |
| Fri, November 18 | | Report | | Stadium: University of Alabama; Tuscaloosa, AL |

Group B
| Pos | Team | Pld | W | D | L | GF | GA | GD | Pts | Qualification |
|---|---|---|---|---|---|---|---|---|---|---|
| 1 | Arizona State | 3 | 2 | 0 | 1 | 2 | 1 | +1 | 6 | Advanced to knockout stage |
| 2 | Colorado "Black" | 3 | 2 | 0 | 1 | 6 | 3 | +3 | 6 | Advanced to knockout stage |
| 3 | Florida State | 3 | 1 | 1 | 1 | 3 | 4 | −1 | 4 | |
| 4 | UConn | 3 | 0 | 1 | 2 | 2 | 5 | −3 | 1 | |

Scores

| 10:00am CST | Colorado | 0–1 | Arizona State | Field 9 |
| Thu, November 17 | | Report | | Stadium: University of Alabama; Tuscaloosa, AL |

| 10:00am CST | Florida State | 1–1 | UConn | Field 10 |
| Thu, November 17 | | Report | | Stadium: University of Alabama; Tuscaloosa, AL |

| 4:00pm CST | UConn | 1–3 | Colorado | Field 9 |
| Thu, November 17 | | Report | | Stadium: University of Alabama; Tuscaloosa, AL |

| 4:00pm CST | Arizona State | 0–1 | Florida State | Field 10 |
| Thu, November 17 | | Report | | Stadium: University of Alabama; Tuscaloosa, AL |

| 12:00pm CST | Colorado | 3–1 | Florida State | Field 6 |
| Fri, November 18 | | Report | | Stadium: University of Alabama; Tuscaloosa, AL |

| 12:00pm CST | UConn | 0–1 | Arizona State | Field 7 |
| Fri, November 18 | | Report | | Stadium: University of Alabama; Tuscaloosa, AL |

Group C
| Pos | Team | Pld | W | D | L | GF | GA | GD | Pts | Qualification |
|---|---|---|---|---|---|---|---|---|---|---|
| 1 | UC Berkeley | 3 | 3 | 0 | 0 | 7 | 1 | +6 | 9 | Advanced to knockout stage |
| 2 | Georgia Southern | 3 | 1 | 0 | 2 | 7 | 7 | 0 | 3 | Advanced to knockout stage |
| 3 | North Dakota State | 3 | 1 | 0 | 2 | 6 | 8 | −2 | 3 | |
| 4 | UW-Stout | 3 | 1 | 0 | 2 | 4 | 8 | −4 | 3 | |

Scores

| 12:00pm CST | NDSU | 1–5 | Georgia Southern | Field 9 |
| Thu, November 17 | | Report | | Stadium: University of Alabama; Tuscaloosa, AL |

| 10:00am CST | UC-Berkeley | 2–0 | UW-Stout | Field 11 |
| Thu, November 17 | | Report | | Stadium: University of Alabama; Tuscaloosa, AL |

| 6:00pm CST | UW-Stout | 1–5 | NDSU | Field 11 |
| Thu, November 17 | | Report | | Stadium: University of Alabama; Tuscaloosa, AL |

| 6:00pm CST | Georgia Southern | 1–3 | UC-Berkeley | Field 9 |
| Thu, November 17 | | Report | | Stadium: University of Alabama; Tuscaloosa, AL |

| 12:00pm CST | NDSU | 0–2 | UC-Berkeley | Field 8 |
| Fri, November 18 | | Report | | Stadium: University of Alabama; Tuscaloosa, AL |

| 12:00pm CST | UW-Stout | 3–1 | Georgia Southern | Field 9 |
| Fri, November 18 | | Report | | Stadium: University of Alabama; Tuscaloosa, AL |

Group D
| Pos | Team | Pld | W | D | L | GF | GA | GD | Pts | Qualification |
|---|---|---|---|---|---|---|---|---|---|---|
| 1 | Oregon | 3 | 3 | 0 | 0 | 8 | 0 | +8 | 9 | Advanced to knockout stage |
| 2 | Georgia Tech | 3 | 2 | 0 | 1 | 6 | 2 | +4 | 6 | Advanced to knockout stage |
| 3 | UW-Eau Claire | 3 | 1 | 0 | 2 | 2 | 8 | −6 | 3 | |
| 4 | SE Louisiana | 3 | 0 | 0 | 3 | 0 | 6 | −6 | 0 | |

Scores

| 12:00pm CST | Georgia Tech | 4–0 | UW-Eau Claire | Field 10 |
| Thu, November 17 | | Report | | Stadium: University of Alabama; Tuscaloosa, AL |

| 12:00pm CST | Oregon | 2–0 | SE Louisiana | Field 11 |
| Thu, November 17 | | Report | | Stadium: University of Alabama; Tuscaloosa, AL |

| 6:00pm CST | SE Louisiana | 0–2 | Georgia Tech | Field 10 |
| Thu, November 17 | | Report | | Stadium: University of Alabama; Tuscaloosa, AL |

| 8:00pm CST | UW-Eau Claire | 0–4 | Oregon | Field 11 |
| Thu, November 17 | | Report | | Stadium: University of Alabama; Tuscaloosa, AL |

| 12:00pm CST | Georgia Tech | 0–2 | Oregon | Field 10 |
| Fri, November 18 | | Report | | Stadium: University of Alabama; Tuscaloosa, AL |

| 12:00pm CST | SE Louisiana | 0–2 | UW-Eau Claire | Field 11 |
| Fri, November 18 | | Report | | Stadium: University of Alabama; Tuscaloosa, AL |

=== Women's open ===
Group A
| Pos | Team | Pld | W | D | L | GF | GA | GD | Pts | Qualification |
|---|---|---|---|---|---|---|---|---|---|---|
| 1 | Vanderbilt | 2 | 1 | 1 | 0 | 3 | 0 | +4 | 7 | Advanced to knockout stage |
| 2 | Iowa State | 2 | 1 | 1 | 0 | 1 | 0 | +2 | 7 | Advanced to knockout stage |
| 3 | Texas Tech | 2 | 0 | 0 | 2 | 0 | 4 | −3 | 3 | |
| 4 | Michigan State | Did not attend (All teams given 3 points and +1 goal difference) | | | | | | | | |

Scores

| 10:00am CST | Texas Tech | 0–1 | Iowa State | Field 2 |
| Thu, November 17 | | Report | | Stadium: University of Alabama; Tuscaloosa, AL |

| 4:00pm CST | Iowa State | 0–0 | Vanderbilt | Field 1 |
| Thu, November 17 | | Report | | Stadium: University of Alabama; Tuscaloosa, AL |

| 10:00am CST | Vanderbilt | 3–0 | Texas Tech | Field 3 |
| Fri, November 18 | | Report | | Stadium: University of Alabama; Tuscaloosa, AL |

Group B
| Pos | Team | Pld | W | D | L | GF | GA | GD | Pts | Qualification |
|---|---|---|---|---|---|---|---|---|---|---|
| 1 | Virginia Tech | 2 | 2 | 0 | 0 | 3 | 0 | +4 | 9 | Advanced to knockout stage |
| 2 | Colorado-Black | 2 | 1 | 0 | 1 | 3 | 3 | +1 | 6 | Advanced to knockout stage |
| 3 | LSU | 2 | 0 | 0 | 2 | 2 | 5 | −2 | 3 | |
| 4 | San Diego State | Did not attend (All teams given 3 points and +1 goal difference) | | | | | | | | |

Scores

| 10:00am CST | Colorado | 3–2 | LSU | Field 3 |
| Thu, November 17 | | Report | | Stadium: University of Alabama; Tuscaloosa, AL |

| 4:00pm CST | LSU | 0–2 | Virginia Tech | Field 4 |
| Thu, November 17 | | Report | | Stadium: University of Alabama; Tuscaloosa, AL |

| 10:00am CST | Colorado | 0–1 | Virginia Tech | Field 5 |
| Fri, November 18 | | Report | | Stadium: University of Alabama; Tuscaloosa, AL |

Group C
| Pos | Team | Pld | W | D | L | GF | GA | GD | Pts | Qualification |
|---|---|---|---|---|---|---|---|---|---|---|
| 1 | Cornell | 3 | 2 | 1 | 0 | 7 | 4 | +3 | 7 | Advanced to knockout stage |
| 2 | Virginia | 3 | 2 | 1 | 0 | 7 | 4 | +3 | 7 | Advanced to knockout stage |
| 3 | Miami (OH) | 3 | 0 | 1 | 2 | 2 | 4 | −2 | 1 | |
| 4 | Colorado State-Green | 3 | 0 | 1 | 2 | 2 | 6 | −4 | 1 | |

Scores

| 2:00pm CST | Cornell | 3–3 | Virginia | Field 3 |
| Thu, November 17 | | Report | | Stadium: University of Alabama; Tuscaloosa, AL |

| 2:00pm CST | Miami (OH) | 1–1 | Colorado State | Field 4 |
| Thu, November 17 | | Report | | Stadium: University of Alabama; Tuscaloosa, AL |

| 8:00pm CST | Colorado State | 0–2 | Cornell | Field 3 |
| Thu, November 17 | | Report | | Stadium: University of Alabama; Tuscaloosa, AL |

| 8:00pm CST | Virginia | 1–0 | Miami (OH) | Field 4 |
| Thu, November 17 | | Report | | Stadium: University of Alabama; Tuscaloosa, AL |

| 12:00pm CST | Cornell | 2–1 | Miami (OH) | Field 1 |
| Fri, November 18 | | Report | | Stadium: University of Alabama; Tuscaloosa, AL |

| 12:00pm CST | Colorado State | 1–3 | Virginia | Field 2 |
| Fri, November 18 | | Report | | Stadium: University of Alabama; Tuscaloosa, AL |

Group D
| Pos | Team | Pld | W | D | L | GF | GA | GD | Pts | Qualification |
|---|---|---|---|---|---|---|---|---|---|---|
| 1 | Kansas | 2 | 2 | 0 | 0 | 9 | 0 | +10 | 9 | Advanced to knockout stage |
| 2 | MTSU | 2 | 1 | 0 | 1 | 2 | 5 | −2 | 6 | Advanced to knockout stage |
| 3 | UC-Berkeley | 2 | 0 | 0 | 2 | 0 | 6 | −5 | 3 | |
| 4 | UCF | Did not attend (All teams given 3 points and +1 goal difference) | | | | | | | | |

Scores

| 12:00pm CST | Kansas | 5–0 | MTSU | Field 3 |
| Thu, November 17 | | Report | | Stadium: University of Alabama; Tuscaloosa, AL |

| 6:00pm CST | UC-Berkeley | 0–4 | Kansas | Field 3 |
| Thu, November 17 | | Report | | Stadium: University of Alabama; Tuscaloosa, AL |

| 12:00pm CST | UC-Berkeley | 0–2 | MTSU | Field 4 |
| Fri, November 18 | | Report | | Stadium: University of Alabama; Tuscaloosa, AL |

== Tournament bracket ==
=== Men's championship ===
Sweet 16
Fri • 8:00am • Field 8
Colorado | 4
Missouri | 1
Fri • 8:00am • Field 9
Penn State | 2
Utah Valley State | 1
Fri • 8:00am • Field 10
Texas A&M | 2
Colorado State | 1
Fri • 8:00am • Field 11
North Texas | 4
Illinois | 1
Fri • 10:00am • Field 8
Weber State | 2
UC-Santa Barbara | 1
Fri • 10:00am • Field 9
Michigan | 0
San Diego | 1
Fri • 10:00am • Field 10
Vanderbilt | 5
Northern Iowa | 0
Fri • 10:00am • Field 11
Dayton | 1
Texas | 0

Quarterfinals
Fri • 5:00pm • Field 9
Colorado | 2
Penn State | 0
Fri • 5:00pm • Field 10
Texas A&M (pen.) | 0 (1)
North Texas | 0 (0)
Fri • 7:00pm • Field 9
Weber State | 3
San Diego | 0
Fri • 7:00pm • Field 10
Vanderbilt | 3
Dayton | 1

Semifinals
Sat • 10:00am • Field 8
Colorado | 3
Texas A&M | 1
Sat • 10:00am • Field 9
Weber State | 1
Vanderbilt | 3

Final
Sat • 5:00pm • Field 10
Colorado (a.e.t.) | 2
Vanderbilt | 1

==== Men's consolation ====
Quarterfinals
Fri • 3:00pm • Field 7
UTEP | 5
Cornell | 1
Fri • 3:00pm • Field 8
Virginia Tech (pen.) | 2 (1)
North Carolina | 2 (0)
Fri • 3:00pm • Field 9
Virginia | 3
UPenn | 1
Fri • 3:00pm • Field 10
Purdue | 1
Delaware | 2

Semifinals
Sat • 8:00am • Field 5
UTEP | 0
Virginia Tech | 4
Sat • 8:00am • Field 6
Virginia | 1
Delaware | 5

Final
Sat • 1:00pm • Field 9
Virginia Tech | 2
Delaware | 3

=== Women's championship ===
Quarterfinals
Fri • 5:00pm • Field 1
Florida | 1
Colorado State | 2
Fri • 5:00pm • Field 2
Penn State | 0
Texas | 3
Fri • 5:00pm • Field 3
Arizona | 1
Michigan | 2
Fri • 5:00pm • Field 4
Colorado (pen.) | 0 (1)
UC-Santa Barbara | 0 (0)

Semifinals
Sat • 10:00am • Field 1
Colorado State | 4
Texas | 0
Sat • 10:00am • Field 2
Michigan (pen.) | 1 (3)
Colorado | 1 (0)

Final
Sat • 3:00pm • Field 10
Colorado State | 1
Michigan (a.e.t.) | 2

=== Men's open ===
Quarterfinals
Fri • 7:00pm • Field 5
Arizona | 1
Colorado "Black" | 0
Fri • 7:00pm • Field 6
Georgia Southern | 0
Oregon | 2
Fri • 7:00pm • Field 7
UC-Berkeley (a.e.t.) | 4
Georgia Tech | 3
Fri • 7:00pm • Field 8
Alabama (a.e.t.) | 2
Arizona State | 1

Semifinals
Sat • 8:00am • Field 8
Arizona | 1
Oregon | 5
Sat • 8:00am • Field 9
UC-Berkeley | 3
Alabama | 2

Final
Sat • 1:00pm • Field 8
Oregon | 2
UC-Berkeley | 0

=== Women's open ===
Quarterfinals
Fri • 7:00pm • Field 1
Vanderbilt | 1
Colorado "Black" | 3
Fri • 7:00pm • Field 2
Virginia | 2
Kansas | 1
Fri • 7:00pm • Field 3
Cornell | 6
MTSU | 0
Fri • 7:00pm • Field 4
Iowa State | 0
Virginia Tech | 1

Semifinals
Sat • 8:00am • Field 1
Colorado "Black" | 0
Virginia | 2
Sat • 8:00am • Field 2
Cornell | 1
Virginia Tech | 2

Final
Sat • 1:00pm • Field 7
Virginia | 1
Virginia Tech | 0

== All tournament teams ==
Key
MVP
Best goalkeeper

=== Men's championship ===
| Name | Team |
|---|---|
| Chris Brosz | Colorado |
| Jason Coker | Colorado |
| Danny Atkins | North Texas |
| Zach Burton | Weber State |
| Nick Van Buecken | Colorado |
| Richard Owen | Vanderbilt |
| Matt Huffstetler | Colorado |
| Matt Bain | Weber State |
| Jake Peters | Dayton |
| Oscar Almeida | Texas A&M |
| Max Cavallini | Vanderbilt |
| Ryan Goepfert | Vanderbilt |

=== Women's championship ===
| Name | Team |
|---|---|
| Katie Miller | Michigan |
| Bre Bennett | Michigan |
| Kerry Greer | Colorado State |
| Dana Restrick | Michigan |
| Jessie Aja | Michigan |
| Catie Chase | Colorado |
| Yobel Gaski | Texas |
| Becca Ainsworth | Texasa |
| Elizabeth Eberly | Colorado State |
| Renee Kreft | Colorado State |
| Annalyn Lavey | Colorado |
| Cat Islas | Arizona |

=== Men's open ===
| Name | Team |
|---|---|
| Brian Mikalaitis | Oregon |
| Patrick Drake | Oregon |
| Ivan Lerma | Arizona |
| Mike Boice | Arizona |
| Michael Gilbert | Alabama |
| Eric Belt | Alabama |
| Jeff Friedman | Arizona State |
| Sean Simmons | Georgia Tech |
| Erin Brown | UC-Berkeley |
| Eric Roberts | Oregon |
| Danny Arriola | UC-Berkeley |
| Zach McManus | Oregon |

=== Women's open ===
| Name | Team |
|---|---|
| Lauren Nuffer | Virginia |
| Kristen Torrance | Virginia |
| Alexandra Koloskus | Colorado |
| Christine Acker | Cornell |
| Liz Edrington | Virginia |
| Lauren Manns | Virginia Tech |
| Lindsey Daughtery | Virginia Tech |
| Meghan Bernard | Colorado |
| Abby Kohlman | Cornell |
| Melissa Thomason | Virginia |
| Meredyth Gehrig | Virginia Tech |
| Kate Anderson | Virginia |
