= 2011 NIRSA National Soccer Championship =

- League: NIRSA
- Sport: Soccer
- Site: Reach 11 Sports Complex; Phoenix, Arizona
- Duration: November 17–19, 2011
- Teams: 24 (Championship); 16 (Open)
- Results: Official Results

Men's Championship Division
- Score: 0–0 (a.e.t.); 4–3 (pen.)
- Champion: Weber State (3rd title, 3rd title game)
- Runners-up: Missouri (2nd title game)
- Season MVP: Cord Stimpson (Weber State)

Women's Championship Division
- Score: 1–0
- Champion: UC-Santa Barbara (6th title, 7th title game)
- Runners-up: Cal Poly (1st title game)
- Season MVP: Laura Caparelli (UC-Santa Barbara)

Men's Open Division
- Score: 5–0
- Champion: UC-San Diego (1st title, 1st title game)
- Runners-up: Texas "B" (3rd title game)
- Season MVP: James Somerville (UC-San Diego)

Women's Open Division
- Score: 2–0
- Champion: Missouri (1st title, 1st title game)
- Runners-up: UC-Berkeley (1st title game)
- Top seed: Lou Opfer (Missouri)

NIRSA national soccer championships seasons
- ← 2010 2012 →

The 2011 NIRSA national soccer championship was the 18th NIRSA National Soccer Championships, the annual national championships for United States-based, collegiate club soccer teams organized by NIRSA. It took place at Reach 11 Sports Complex, in Phoenix, Arizona from Thursday, November 17 to Saturday, November 19, 2011.

== Overview ==
=== Men's championship ===
In the finals, reigning runners-up, Missouri, would face the 2009 champions, Weber State. In the group stage, Missouri would win their opener 2–1 against 2008 runner-up, Colorado State, but would lose their finale 1–2 against 2007 champions, UC-Santa Barbara to finish second in their group. Meanwhile, Weber State would win their opener 3–1 over Delaware then would defeat Minnesota 2–1 to top their group.

In the knockout round, Missouri would be deadlocked 0–0 with 2000 champions, Penn State, in the round of 16 after regulation and extra time meaning they would require penalty kicks, which they won 3–0. They would then defeat 2004 champions Texas A&M 1–0 to advance to the semifinals. Meanwhile, Weber State would defeat UConn 1–0 in the round of 16 then would defeat Cal Poly 3–0 in the quarterfinals. In the semifinals, Missouri would defeat Minnesota 1–0 while Weber State would defeat North Carolina 3–0 to advance to their second finals in three years.

In the finals, the game would remain tied 0–0 at the end of regular time and extra time, meaning a penalty shootout would decide the champion for the second time in three years. Missouri would kick first and the first 2 rounds saw all four kicks being saved while the next 3 rounds saw all six being scored, meaning an extra round of kicks would be needed. In the sixth round of kicks, Missouri would hit the crossbar while Korbin Tafoya of Weber State would score, giving Weber State the title, their second in three years and their third overall. Weber State's Cord Stimpson would be named men's championship MVP.

=== Women's championship ===
In the finals, regulars UC-Santa Barbara would return to their fifth straight women's championship finals to face finals debutants Cal Poly. Coming into the finals, UC-Santa Barbara won every game except the quarterfinals by at least 2 goals, including a 8–0 victory in the group stage. However, the quarterfinals did require extra time against Pitt, which they won 2–1. Meanwhile, Cal Poly tied their opener to eventual consolation champions Ohio State, but would win their next four games. In the finals, eventual women's championship MVP Laura Caparelli of UC-Santa Barbara would score in the 24th minute. This goal would be enough to separate the teams, leading UC-Santa Barbara to their sixth title and their fifth straight, the longest consecutive title streak across all four divisions. This title also gave them sole possession of the most titles for a single team with six, over taking BYU in the men's championship division.

=== Men's open ===
In the finals, inaugural champions, Texas "B", would face regional tournament runners-up, UC-San Diego. In the knockout round, Texas "B" would face Colorado "Black", a team that also had a separate team playing in the championship division, in the quarterfinals and would win 3–1 then would beat Northeastern 2–0 in the semifinals. Meanwhile, UC-San Diego would require penalty kicks in both their knockout stage games, first against intra-city rivals San Diego State which they won 2–2 (4–3) then intrastate opponents USC 0–0 (5–4). In the finals, UC-San Diego would dominate winning 5–0 and claiming their first men's open title. UC-San Diego sophomore James Somerville would be named men's open MVP.

=== Women's open ===
In the finals, two teams would be making their first finals appearance: Missouri and UC-Berkeley. Coming into the finals, Missouri would win both games knockout games 2–0, first against 2009 women's open champions JMU and then against reigning women's open champions Illinois. Meanwhile, UC-Berkeley would require penalty kicks in their quarterfinal matchup against 2009 runners-up Oregon then would beat intrastate rivals USC 3–0. In the finals, Missouri would win 2–0 to claim their first women's open title.

== Format ==
The competition consisted of 80 teams: 48 championship division teams and 32 open division teams. Each of these divisions were further divided into two equal sized divisions for men and women. The championship division divided teams into eight groups of three teams each while the open division divided teams into four groups of four teams each, both engaging in a round-robin tournament that determined teams able to advance to a knockout stage. Pool play games were two 40-minute halves, separated by a seven-minute halftime and utilized the three points for a win system. After group stage play, the two highest ranked teams from each group advanced to their respective knockout stage. In the championship division, the third placed team advanced to a consolation bracket while in the open division, the third and fourth placed teams were eliminated.

Tie-breaking criteria for group play
The ranking of teams in each group was based on the following criteria in order:
1. Highest number of points
2. Winner of head-to-head competition
3. Greatest goal difference
  - Maximum ± 5 goal difference per match
4. Most goals scored
5. Most shutouts

In a tie breaking scenario involving more than 2 teams, the tiebreaker procedure would begin. If one team is identified as different and both remaining teams are still tied, the tie breaker procedure is restarted.

If a tie still remained after the first 5 criteria, the following was used to break a tie:

1. NCAA kicks from the mark
  - If there was a three-way tie, a coin-flip would be conducted. The two teams that chose the same outcome would compete in kicks from the mark between each other. The winner would compete with the last remaining team in kicks from the mark
  - If there's a four-way tie, a drawing of lots would be conducted (only could occur in open division)

Knockout stage games also consisted of two 40-minute halves. The round of 16 and quarterfinals were separated by a seven-minute halftime while the semifinals and finals had a ten-minute halftime. Knockout stage games needed to declare a winner, therefore if a game was tied at the end of regulation, one 15-minute, golden-goal overtime period would begin. If still tied after overtime, kicks from the mark would determine the winner.

== Qualification and selections ==
Each of the six regions received three automatic bids for both the men's and women's championship that they awarded to its members. The final six bids were considered "at-large", and were given out by NIRSA to teams, typically based on their regional tournament results and RPI.

The 32 remaining teams participated in the open division, chosen on a first-come first-serve basis online on September 28, 2011

=== Men's championship ===
Participating teams
Region	Team	Appearance	Last Bid
I	Penn State	11th	2009
I	Navy	9th	2010
I	Delaware	7th	2010
I	UConn	1st	Never
II	North Carolina	10th	2010
II	Florida	6th	2010
II	Georgia	6th	2009
III	Michigan	10th	2010
III	Ohio State	7th	2009
III	Indiana	6th	2008
III	Michigan State	5th	2009
III	Northwestern	2nd	2010
IV	Texas	13th	2010
IV	Texas A&M	12th	2010
IV	Missouri	6th	2010
IV	Texas State	5th	2009
V	Colorado State	15th	2010
V	Colorado	12th	2010
V	Minnesota	10th	2010
VI	Weber State	11th	2010
VI	Arizona	10th	2010
VI	UC Santa Barabara	8th	2009
VI	UC Berkeley	4th	2009
VI	Cal Poly	3rd	2010

=== Women's championship ===
Participating teams
Region	Team	Appearance	Last Bid
I	Penn State	17th	2010
I	Delaware	9th	2010
I	Cornell	6th	2010
I	Pitt	2nd	2010
II	Virginia Tech	11th	2010
II	Florida	10th	2010
II	North Carolina	8th	2010
II	Virginia	6th	2010
III	Michigan	13th	2010
III	Ohio State	11th	2010
III	Michigan State	8th	2009
III	Indiana	3rd	2004
III	Marquette	3rd	2010
IV	Texas	12th	2010
IV	TCU	1st	Never
IV	Wash U	1st	Never
V	Colorado	17th	2010
V	Colorado State	15th	2010
V	Colorado Mines	2nd	2009
VI	UC-Santa Barbara	11th	2010
VI	San Diego State	9th	2008
VI	Arizona	7th	2010
VI	UCLA	5th	2010
VI	Cal Poly	2nd	2009

=== Men's open ===
Participating teams
Region	Num	Team
I	4	Penn, SUNY Cortland, Northeastern, Villanova
II	1	Kennesaw State
III	0	–
IV	1	Texas "B"
V	2	Colorado "Black", Colorado Mines
VI	8	Cal Poly "B", UC-Irvine, Northern Arizona, Southern Cal (USC), San Diego State, UC-Santa Cruz, UCLA, UC San Diego

=== Women's open ===
Participating teams
Region	Num	Team(s)
I	3	Northeastern, SUNY Cortland, Villanova
II	4	Kennesaw State, MTSU, JMU, Vanderbilit
III	1	Illinois
IV	1	Missouri
V	1	Colorado "Black"
VI	6	Southern Cal (USC), Arizona State, Salt Lake CC, Oregon, UC-Berkeley, Northern Arizona

== Group stage ==
=== Men's championship ===
Group A
Pos	Team	Pld	W	D	L	GF	GA	GD	Pts	Qualification
1	Michigan State	2	1	1	0	3	1	+2	4	Advanced to knockout stage
2	UC-Berkeley	2	1	1	0	3	1	+2	4	Advanced to knockout stage
3	Navy	2	0	0	2	2	6	−4	0	Consolation

Scores

8:00am MST	Michigan State	0–0	UC-Berkeley	Field 11
Thu, November 17		Report		Stadium: Reach 11 Sports Complex; Phoenix, Arizona

1:15pm MST	UC-Berkeley	3–1	Navy	Field 11
Thu, November 17		Report		Stadium: Reach 11 Sports Complex; Phoenix, Arizona

6:30pm MST	Navy	1–3	Michigan State	Field 11
Thu, November 17		Report		Stadium: Reach 11 Sports Complex; Phoenix, Arizona

9:30am MST	Michigan State	3–2; Kicks from the mark	UC-Berkeley	Field 11
Fri, November 18		Report		Stadium: Reach 11 Sports Complex; Phoenix, Arizona

Group B
Pos	Team	Pld	W	D	L	GF	GA	GD	Pts	Qualification
1	UC-Santa Barbara	2	2	0	0	4	1	+3	6	Advanced to knockout stage
2	Missouri	2	1	0	1	3	3	0	3	Advanced to knockout stage
3	Colorado State	2	0	0	2	1	4	−3	0	Consolation

Scores

8:00am MST	Missouri	2–1	Colorado State	Field 12
Thu, November 17		Report		Stadium: Reach 11 Sports Complex; Phoenix, Arizona

1:15pm MST	Colorado State	0–2	UCSB	Field 12
Thu, November 17		Report		Stadium: Reach 11 Sports Complex; Phoenix, Arizona

6:30pm MST	UCSB	2–1	Missouri	Field 12
Thu, November 17		Report		Stadium: Reach 11 Sports Complex; Phoenix, Arizona

Group C
Pos	Team	Pld	W	D	L	GF	GA	GD	Pts	Qualification
1	Penn State	2	1	1	0	2	1	+1	4	Advanced to knockout stage
2	Texas State	2	1	0	1	2	1	+1	3	Advanced to knockout stage
3	Ohio State	2	0	1	1	1	3	−2	1	Consolation

Scores

8:00am MST	Penn State	1–1	Ohio State	Field 13
Thu, November 17		Report		Stadium: Reach 11 Sports Complex; Phoenix, Arizona

1:15pm MST	Ohio State	0–2	Texas State	Field 13
Thu, November 17		Report		Stadium: Reach 11 Sports Complex; Phoenix, Arizona

6:30pm MST	Texas State	0–1	Penn State	Field 13
Thu, November 17		Report		Stadium: Reach 11 Sports Complex; Phoenix, Arizona

Group D
Pos	Team	Pld	W	D	L	GF	GA	GD	Pts	Qualification
1	Colorado	2	1	1	0	2	1	+1	4	Advanced to knockout stage
2	Cal Poly	2	1	0	1	4	2	+2	3	Advanced to knockout stage
3	Texas	2	0	1	1	2	5	−3	1	Consolation

Scores

8:00am MST	Colorado	1–1	Texas	Field 14
Thu, November 17		Report		Stadium: Reach 11 Sports Complex; Phoenix, Arizona

1:15pm MST	Texas	1–4	Cal Poly	Field 14
Thu, November 17		Report		Stadium: Reach 11 Sports Complex; Phoenix, Arizona

6:30pm MST	Cal Poly	0–1	Colorado	Field 14
Thu, November 17		Report		Stadium: Reach 11 Sports Complex; Phoenix, Arizona

Group E
Pos	Team	Pld	W	D	L	GF	GA	GD	Pts	Qualification
1	Florida	2	1	0	1	5	3	+2	3	Advanced to knockout stage
2	UConn	2	1	0	1	2	2	0	3	Advanced to knockout stage
3	Michigan	2	1	0	1	2	4	−2	3	Consolation

Scores

9:45am MST	Florida	1–2	UConn	Field 11
Thu, November 17		Report		Stadium: Reach 11 Sports Complex; Phoenix, Arizona

3:00pm MST	UConn	0–1	Michigan	Field 11
Thu, November 17		Report		Stadium: Reach 11 Sports Complex; Phoenix, Arizona

8:15pm MST	Michigan	1–4	Florida	Field 11
Thu, November 17		Report		Stadium: Reach 11 Sports Complex; Phoenix, Arizona

Group F
Pos	Team	Pld	W	D	L	GF	GA	GD	Pts	Qualification
1	Arizona	2	1	1	0	3	2	+1	4	Advanced to knockout stage
2	North Carolina	2	0	2	0	3	3	0	2	Advanced to knockout stage
3	Indiana	2	0	1	1	1	2	−1	1	Consolation

Scores

9:45am MST	Arizona	2–2	North Carolina	Field 12
Thu, November 17		Report		Stadium: Reach 11 Sports Complex; Phoenix, Arizona

3:00pm MST	North Carolina	1–1	Indiana	Field 12
Thu, November 17		Report		Stadium: Reach 11 Sports Complex; Phoenix, Arizona

8:15pm MST	Indiana	0–1	Arizona	Field 12
Thu, November 17		Report		Stadium: Reach 11 Sports Complex; Phoenix, Arizona

Group G
Pos	Team	Pld	W	D	L	GF	GA	GD	Pts	Qualification
1	Northwestern	2	1	1	0	1	0	+1	4	Advanced to knockout stage
2	Texas A&M	2	1	1	0	1	0	+1	4	Advanced to knockout stage
3	Georgia	2	0	0	2	0	2	−2	0	Consolation

Scores

9:45am MST	Northwestern	0–0	Texas A&M	Field 13
Thu, November 17		Report		Stadium: Reach 11 Sports Complex; Phoenix, Arizona

3:00pm MST	Texas A&M	1–0	Georgia	Field 13
Thu, November 17		Report		Stadium: Reach 11 Sports Complex; Phoenix, Arizona

8:15pm MST	Georgia	0–1	Northwestern	Field 13
Thu, November 17		Report		Stadium: Reach 11 Sports Complex; Phoenix, Arizona

9:30am MST	Northwestern	4–3; Kicks from the mark	Texas A&M	Field 13
Fri, November 18		Report		Stadium: Reach 11 Sports Complex; Phoenix, Arizona

Group H
Pos	Team	Pld	W	D	L	GF	GA	GD	Pts	Qualification
1	Weber State	2	2	0	0	5	2	+3	6	Advanced to knockout stage
2	Minnesota	2	1	0	1	3	2	+1	3	Advanced to knockout stage
3	Delaware	2	0	0	2	1	5	−4	0	Consolation

Scores

9:45am MST	Weber State	3–1	Delaware	Field 14
Thu, November 17		Report		Stadium: Reach 11 Sports Complex; Phoenix, Arizona

3:00pm MST	Delaware	0–2	Minnesota	Field 14
Thu, November 17		Report		Stadium: Reach 11 Sports Complex; Phoenix, Arizona

8:15pm MST	Minnesota	1–2	Weber State	Field 14
Thu, November 17		Report		Stadium: Reach 11 Sports Complex; Phoenix, Arizona

=== Women's championship ===
Group A
Pos	Team	Pld	W	D	L	GF	GA	GD	Pts	Qualification
1	UC-Santa Barbara	2	2	0	0	10	0	+10	6	Advanced to knockout stage
2	TCU	2	0	1	1	0	2	−2	1	Advanced to knockout stage
3	Colorado Mines	2	0	1	1	0	8	−8	1	Consolation

Scores

8:00am MST	UCSB	2–0	TCU	Field 15
Thu, November 17		Report		Stadium: Reach 11 Sports Complex; Phoenix, Arizona

1:15pm MST	TCU	0–0	Colorado Mines	Field 15
Thu, November 17		Report		Stadium: Reach 11 Sports Complex; Phoenix, Arizona

6:30pm MST	Colorado Mines	0–8	UCSB	Field 15
Thu, November 17		Report		Stadium: Reach 11 Sports Complex; Phoenix, Arizona

Group B
Pos	Team	Pld	W	D	L	GF	GA	GD	Pts	Qualification
1	Colorado	2	2	0	0	3	0	+3	6	Advanced to knockout stage
2	Cornell	2	0	1	1	1	2	−1	1	Advanced to knockout stage
3	Virginia	2	0	1	1	1	3	−2	1	Consolation

Scores

8:00am MST	Virginia	0–2	Colorado	Field 16
Thu, November 17		Report		Stadium: Reach 11 Sports Complex; Phoenix, Arizona

1:15pm MST	Colorado	1–0	Cornell	Field 16
Thu, November 17		Report		Stadium: Reach 11 Sports Complex; Phoenix, Arizona

6:30pm MST	Cornell	1–1	Virginia	Field 16
Thu, November 17		Report		Stadium: Reach 11 Sports Complex; Phoenix, Arizona

Group C
Pos	Team	Pld	W	D	L	GF	GA	GD	Pts	Qualification
1	Michigan	2	2	0	0	6	2	+4	6	Advanced to knockout stage
2	Texas	2	1	0	1	7	6	+1	3	Advanced to knockout stage
3	Delaware	2	0	0	2	3	8	−5	0	Consolation

Scores

8:00am MST	Texas	6–2	Delaware	Field 17
Thu, November 17		Report		Stadium: Reach 11 Sports Complex; Phoenix, Arizona

1:15pm MST	Delaware	1–2	Michigan	Field 17
Thu, November 17		Report		Stadium: Reach 11 Sports Complex; Phoenix, Arizona

6:30pm MST	Michigan	4–1	Texas	Field 17
Thu, November 17		Report		Stadium: Reach 11 Sports Complex; Phoenix, Arizona

Group D
Pos	Team	Pld	W	D	L	GF	GA	GD	Pts	Qualification
1	Cal Poly	2	1	1	0	4	2	+2	4	Advanced to knockout stage
2	North Carolina	2	1	0	1	4	3	+1	3	Advanced to knockout stage
3	Ohio State	2	0	1	1	1	4	−3	1	Consolation

Scores

8:00am MST	Cal Poly	1–1	Ohio State	Field 18
Thu, November 17		Report		Stadium: Reach 11 Sports Complex; Phoenix, Arizona

1:15pm MST	Ohio State	0–3	North Carolina	Field 18
Thu, November 17		Report		Stadium: Reach 11 Sports Complex; Phoenix, Arizona

6:30pm MST	North Carolina	1–3	Cal Poly	Field 18
Thu, November 17		Report		Stadium: Reach 11 Sports Complex; Phoenix, Arizona

Group E
Pos	Team	Pld	W	D	L	GF	GA	GD	Pts	Qualification
1	Michigan State	2	2	0	0	4	2	+2	6	Advanced to knockout stage
2	Wash U	2	1	0	1	3	3	0	3	Advanced to knockout stage
3	Arizona	2	0	0	2	4	6	−2	0	Consolation

Scores

9:45am MST	Michigan State	3–2	Arizona	Field 15
Thu, November 17		Report		Stadium: Reach 11 Sports Complex; Phoenix, Arizona

3:00pm MST	Arizona	2–3	Wash U	Field 15
Thu, November 17		Report		Stadium: Reach 11 Sports Complex; Phoenix, Arizona

8:15pm MST	Wash U	0–1	Michigan State	Field 15
Thu, November 17		Report		Stadium: Reach 11 Sports Complex; Phoenix, Arizona

Group F
Pos	Team	Pld	W	D	L	GF	GA	GD	Pts	Qualification
1	Florida	2	2	0	0	5	0	+5	6	Advanced to knockout stage
2	Penn State	2	0	1	1	1	3	−2	1	Advanced to knockout stage
3	SDSU	2	0	1	1	1	4	−3	1	Consolation

Scores

9:45am MST	Penn State	0–2	Florida	Field 16
Thu, November 17		Report		Stadium: Reach 11 Sports Complex; Phoenix, Arizona

3:00pm MST	Florida	3–0	SDSU	Field 16
Thu, November 17		Report		Stadium: Reach 11 Sports Complex; Phoenix, Arizona

8:15pm MST	SDSU	1–1	Penn State	Field 16
Thu, November 17		Report		Stadium: Reach 11 Sports Complex; Phoenix, Arizona

Group G
Pos	Team	Pld	W	D	L	GF	GA	GD	Pts	Qualification
1	UCLA	2	2	0	0	11	3	+8	6	Advanced to knockout stage
2	Virginia Tech	2	1	0	1	2	3	−1	3	Advanced to knockout stage
3	Indiana	2	0	0	2	3	10	−7	0	Consolation

Scores

9:45am MST	Indiana	0–2	Virginia Tech	Field 17
Thu, November 17		Report		Stadium: Reach 11 Sports Complex; Phoenix, Arizona

3:00pm MST	Virginia Tech	0–3	UCLA	Field 17
Thu, November 17		Report		Stadium: Reach 11 Sports Complex; Phoenix, Arizona

8:15pm MST	UCLA	8–3	Indiana	Field 17
Thu, November 17		Report		Stadium: Reach 11 Sports Complex; Phoenix, Arizona

Group H
Pos	Team	Pld	W	D	L	GF	GA	GD	Pts	Qualification
1	Pittsburgh	2	2	0	0	4	2	+2	6	Advanced to knockout stage
2	Marquette	2	1	0	1	2	2	0	3	Advanced to knockout stage
3	Colorado State	2	0	0	2	1	3	−2	0	Consolation

Scores

9:45am MST	Colorado State	1–2	Pitt	Field 18
Thu, November 17		Report		Stadium: Reach 11 Sports Complex; Phoenix, Arizona

3:00pm MST	Pitt	2–1	Marquette	Field 18
Thu, November 17		Report		Stadium: Reach 11 Sports Complex; Phoenix, Arizona

8:15pm MST	Marquette	1–0	Colorado State	Field 18
Thu, November 17		Report		Stadium: Reach 11 Sports Complex; Phoenix, Arizona

=== Men's open ===
Group A
Pos	Team	Pld	W	D	L	GF	GA	GD	Pts	Qualification
1	Penn	3	2	1	0	8	3	+5	7	Advanced to knockout stage
2	Cal Poly “B”	3	1	2	0	5	3	+2	5	Advanced to knockout stage
3	UC Irvine	3	0	2	1	7	9	−2	2	
4	Northern Arizona	3	0	1	2	3	8	−5	1	

Scores

8:00am MST	Cal Poly “B”	3–1	Northern Arizona	Field 5
Thu, November 17		Report		Stadium: Reach 11 Sports Complex; Phoenix, Arizona

8:00am MST	UC Irvine	3–5	Penn	Field 6
Thu, November 17		Report		Stadium: Reach 11 Sports Complex; Phoenix, Arizona

3:00pm MST	Penn	0–0	Cal Poly “B”	Field 5
Thu, November 17		Report		Stadium: Reach 11 Sports Complex; Phoenix, Arizona

3:00pm MST	Northern Arizona	2–2	UC Irvine	Field 6
Thu, November 17		Report		Stadium: Reach 11 Sports Complex; Phoenix, Arizona

8:00am MST	Cal Poly “B”	2–2	UC Irvine	Field 5
Fri, November 18		Report		Stadium: Reach 11 Sports Complex; Phoenix, Arizona

8:00am MST	Penn	3–0	Northern Arizona	Field 6
Fri, November 18		Report		Stadium: Reach 11 Sports Complex; Phoenix, Arizona

Group B
Pos	Team	Pld	W	D	L	GF	GA	GD	Pts	Qualification
1	Southern Cal	3	2	1	0	9	1	+8	7	Advanced to knockout stage
2	Northeastern	3	1	1	1	5	4	+1	4	Advanced to knockout stage
3	SUNY Cortland	3	1	0	2	1	7	−6	3	
4	Kennesaw State	3	1	0	2	5	8	−3	3	

Scores

8:00am MST	USC	4–1	Kennesaw State	Field 8
Thu, November 17		Report		Stadium: Reach 11 Sports Complex; Phoenix, Arizona

8:00am MST	SUNY Cortland	0–2	Northeastern	Field 9
Thu, November 17		Report		Stadium: Reach 11 Sports Complex; Phoenix, Arizona

3:00pm MST	Northeastern	0–0	USC	Field 8
Thu, November 17		Report		Stadium: Reach 11 Sports Complex; Phoenix, Arizona

3:00pm MST	Kennesaw State	0–1	SUNY Cortland	Field 9
Thu, November 17		Report		Stadium: Reach 11 Sports Complex; Phoenix, Arizona

8:00am MST	USC	5–0	SUNY Cortland	Field 8
Fri, November 18		Report		Stadium: Reach 11 Sports Complex; Phoenix, Arizona

8:00am MST	Northeastern	3–4	Kennesaw State	Field 9
Fri, November 18		Report		Stadium: Reach 11 Sports Complex; Phoenix, Arizona

Group C
Pos	Team	Pld	W	D	L	GF	GA	GD	Pts	Qualification
1	Colorado “Black”	3	2	0	1	4	4	0	6	Advanced to knockout stage
2	SDSU	3	1	1	1	4	3	+1	4	Advanced to knockout stage
3	UC Santa Cruz	3	1	1	1	4	3	+1	4	
4	Villanova	3	1	0	2	1	3	−2	3	

Scores

9:45am MST	SDSU	2–0	Villanova	Field 5
Thu, November 17		Report		Stadium: Reach 11 Sports Complex; Phoenix, Arizona

9:45am MST	Colorado “Black”	1–3	UC Santa Cruz	Field 6
Thu, November 17		Report		Stadium: Reach 11 Sports Complex; Phoenix, Arizona

4:45pm MST	UC Santa Cruz	1–1	SDSU	Field 5
Thu, November 17		Report		Stadium: Reach 11 Sports Complex; Phoenix, Arizona

4:45pm MST	Villanova	0–1	Colorado “Black”	Field 6
Thu, November 17		Report		Stadium: Reach 11 Sports Complex; Phoenix, Arizona

10:00am MST	SDSU	1–2	Colorado “Black”	Field 5
Fri, November 18		Report		Stadium: Reach 11 Sports Complex; Phoenix, Arizona

10:00am MST	UC Santa Cruz	0–1	Villanova	Field 6
Fri, November 18		Report		Stadium: Reach 11 Sports Complex; Phoenix, Arizona

Group D
Pos	Team	Pld	W	D	L	GF	GA	GD	Pts	Qualification
1	UC San Diego	3	2	0	1	4	3	+1	6	Advanced to knockout stage
2	Texas “B”	3	1	2	0	3	2	+1	5	Advanced to knockout stage
3	Colorado Mines	3	0	2	1	2	3	−1	2	
4	UCLA	3	0	2	1	0	1	−1	2	

Scores

9:45am MST	UCLA	0–0	Colorado Mines	Field 8
Thu, November 17		Report		Stadium: Reach 11 Sports Complex; Phoenix, Arizona

9:45am MST	Texas “B”	2–1	UC San Diego	Field 9
Thu, November 17		Report		Stadium: Reach 11 Sports Complex; Phoenix, Arizona

4:45pm MST	UC San Diego	1–0	UCLA	Field 8
Thu, November 17		Report		Stadium: Reach 11 Sports Complex; Phoenix, Arizona

4:45pm MST	Colorado Mines	1–1	Texas “B”	Field 9
Thu, November 17		Report		Stadium: Reach 11 Sports Complex; Phoenix, Arizona

10:00am MST	UCLA	0–0	Texas “B”	Field 8
Fri, November 18		Report		Stadium: Reach 11 Sports Complex; Phoenix, Arizona

10:00am MST	UC San Diego	2–1	Colorado Mines	Field 9
Fri, November 18		Report		Stadium: Reach 11 Sports Complex; Phoenix, Arizona

=== Women's open ===
Group A
Pos	Team	Pld	W	D	L	GF	GA	GD	Pts	Qualification
1	Illinois	3	2	1	0	6	3	+3	7	Advanced to knockout stage
2	Southern Cal (USC)	3	2	0	1	9	5	+4	6	Advanced to knockout stage
3	Arizona State	3	1	1	1	5	4	+1	4	
4	Kennesaw State	3	0	0	3	2	10	−8	0	

Scores

11:30am MST	Illinois	2–0	Kennesaw State	Field 5
Thu, November 17		Report		Stadium: Reach 11 Sports Complex; Phoenix, Arizona

11:30am MST	USC	2–1	Arizona State	Field 6
Thu, November 17		Report		Stadium: Reach 11 Sports Complex; Phoenix, Arizona

6:30pm MST	Arizona State	2–2	Illinois	Field 5
Thu, November 17		Report		Stadium: Reach 11 Sports Complex; Phoenix, Arizona

6:30pm MST	Kennesaw State	2–6	USC	Field 6
Thu, November 17		Report		Stadium: Reach 11 Sports Complex; Phoenix, Arizona

12:00pm MST	Illinois	2–1	USC	Field 5
Fri, November 18		Report		Stadium: Reach 11 Sports Complex; Phoenix, Arizona

12:00pm MST	Arizona State	2–0	Kennesaw State	Field 6
Fri, November 18		Report		Stadium: Reach 11 Sports Complex; Phoenix, Arizona

Group B
Pos	Team	Pld	W	D	L	GF	GA	GD	Pts	Qualification
1	Salt Lake CC	3	2	1	0	4	1	+3	7	Advanced to knockout stage
2	Colorado “Black”	3	2	1	0	3	0	+3	7	Advanced to knockout stage
3	Northeastern	3	1	0	2	3	4	−1	3	
4	MTSU	3	0	0	3	0	5	−5	0	

Scores

11:30am MST	Colorado “Black”	0–0	Salt Lake CC	Field 8
Thu, November 17		Report		Stadium: Reach 11 Sports Complex; Phoenix, Arizona

11:30am MST	Northeastern	2–0	MTSU	Field 9
Thu, November 17		Report		Stadium: Reach 11 Sports Complex; Phoenix, Arizona

6:30pm MST	MTSU	0–1	Colorado “Black”	Field 8
Thu, November 17		Report		Stadium: Reach 11 Sports Complex; Phoenix, Arizona

6:30pm MST	Salt Lake CC	2–1	Northeastern	Field 9
Thu, November 17		Report		Stadium: Reach 11 Sports Complex; Phoenix, Arizona

12:00pm MST	Colorado “Black”	2–0	Northeastern	Field 8
Fri, November 18		Report		Stadium: Reach 11 Sports Complex; Phoenix, Arizona

12:00pm MST	MTSU	0–2	Salt Lake CC	Field 9
Fri, November 18		Report		Stadium: Reach 11 Sports Complex; Phoenix, Arizona

Group C
Pos	Team	Pld	W	D	L	GF	GA	GD	Pts	Qualification
1	JMU	3	3	0	0	9	0	+9	9	Advanced to knockout stage
2	Oregon	3	2	0	1	6	2	+4	6	Advanced to knockout stage
3	Vanderbilt	3	1	0	2	1	4	−3	3	
4	SUNY Cortland	3	0	0	3	0	10	−10	0	

Scores

1:15pm MST	Oregon	4–0	SUNY Cortland	Field 5
Thu, November 17		Report		Stadium: Reach 11 Sports Complex; Phoenix, Arizona

1:15pm MST	JMU	2–0	Vanderbilt	Field 6
Thu, November 17		Report		Stadium: Reach 11 Sports Complex; Phoenix, Arizona

8:15pm MST	Vanderbilt	0–2	Oregon	Field 5
Thu, November 17		Report		Stadium: Reach 11 Sports Complex; Phoenix, Arizona

8:15pm MST	SUNY Cortland	0–5	JMU	Field 6
Thu, November 17		Report		Stadium: Reach 11 Sports Complex; Phoenix, Arizona

2:00pm MST	Oregon	0–2	JMU	Field 5
Fri, November 18		Report		Stadium: Reach 11 Sports Complex; Phoenix, Arizona

2:00pm MST	Vanderbilt	1–0	SUNY Cortland	Field 6
Fri, November 18		Report		Stadium: Reach 11 Sports Complex; Phoenix, Arizona

Group D
Pos	Team	Pld	W	D	L	GF	GA	GD	Pts	Qualification
1	UC-Berkeley	3	2	1	0	10	1	+9	7	Advanced to knockout stage
2	Missouri	3	2	1	0	8	1	+7	7	Advanced to knockout stage
3	Northern Arizona	3	1	0	2	3	10	−7	3	
4	Villanova	3	0	0	3	0	9	−9	0	

Scores

1:15pm MST	Missouri	5–0	Northern Arizona	Field 8
Thu, November 17		Report		Stadium: Reach 11 Sports Complex; Phoenix, Arizona

1:15pm MST	UC-Berkeley	4–0	Villanova	Field 9
Thu, November 17		Report		Stadium: Reach 11 Sports Complex; Phoenix, Arizona

8:15pm MST	Villanova	0–2	Missouri	Field 8
Thu, November 17		Report		Stadium: Reach 11 Sports Complex; Phoenix, Arizona

8:15pm MST	Northern Arizona	0–5	UC-Berkeley	Field 9
Thu, November 17		Report		Stadium: Reach 11 Sports Complex; Phoenix, Arizona

2:00pm MST	Missouri	1–1	UC-Berkeley	Field 8
Fri, November 18		Report		Stadium: Reach 11 Sports Complex; Phoenix, Arizona

2:00pm MST	Villanova	0–3	Northern Arizona	Field 9
Fri, November 18		Report		Stadium: Reach 11 Sports Complex; Phoenix, Arizona

== Tournament bracket ==
=== Men's championship ===
Sweet 16
Fri • 10:00am • Field 11
Michigan State	1
Cal Poly	2
Fri • 10:00am • Field 12
Weber State (a.e.t.)	1
UConn	0
Fri • 10:00am • Field 13
Northwestern	0
North Carolina	1
Fri • 10:00am • Field 14
UC-Santa Barbara (pen.)	1 (5)
Texas State	1 (4)
Fri • 12:00pm • Field 11
Penn State	0 (0)
Missouri (pen.)	0 (3)
Fri • 12:00pm • Field 12
Arizona	0
Texas A&M	2
Fri • 12:00pm • Field 13
Florida	3 (2)
Minnesota (pen.)	3 (4)
Fri • 12:00pm • Field 14
Colorado	0
UC-Berkeley	2

Quarterfinals
Fri • 4:00pm • Field 13
Cal Poly	0
Weber State	3
Fri • 4:00pm • Field 14
North Carolina	3
UC-Santa Barbara	0
Fri • 6:00pm • Field 13
Missouri	1
Texas A&M	0
Fri • 6:00pm • Field 14
Minnesota	2
UC-Berkeley	1

Semifinals
Sat • 10:00am • Field 13
Weber State	3
North Carolina	0
Sat • 10:00am • Field 14
Missouri	1
Minnesota	0

Final
Sat • 5:00pm • Field 16
Weber State (pen.)	0 (4)
Missouri	0 (3)

==== Men's consolation ====
Quarterfinals
Fri • 4:00pm • Field 5
Navy	1
Michigan	0
Fri • 4:00pm • Field 6
Indiana (pen.)	2 (4)
Colorado State	2 (2)
Fri • 4:00pm • Field 5
Ohio State	1
Georgia	0
Fri • 4:00pm • Field 6
Delaware	1 (4)
Texas (pen.)	1 (5)

Semifinals
Sat • 8:00am • Field 15
Navy	0
Indiana	1
Sat • 8:00am • Field 16
Ohio State	0
Texas	1

Final
Sat • 1:00pm • Field 17
Indiana	1
Texas	2

=== Women's championship ===
Sweet 16
Fri • 10:00am • Field 15
UC-Santa Barbara	3
North Carolina	0
Fri • 10:00am • Field 16
Pitt	2
Wash U	1
Fri • 10:00am • Field 17
UCLA	3 (3)
Penn State (pen.)	3 (4)
Fri • 10:00am • Field 18
Colorado	1
Texas	2
Fri • 12:00pm • Field 15
Michigan	0
Cornell	1
Fri • 12:00pm • Field 16
Florida	1
Virginia Tech	3
Fri • 12:00pm • Field 17
Michigan State	1
Marquette	0
Fri • 12:00pm • Field 18
Cal Poly	2
TCU	1

Quarterfinals
Fri • 4:00pm • Field 17
UC-Santa Barbara (a.e.t.)	2
Pitt	1
Fri • 4:00pm • Field 18
Penn State	0
Texas	2
Fri • 6:00pm • Field 17
Cornell	1
Virginia Tech	3
Fri • 6:00pm • Field 18
Michigan State	0
Cal Poly	2

Semifinals
Sat • 10:00am • Field 15
UC-Santa Barbara	3
Texas	1
Sat • 10:00am • Field 16
Virginia Tech	0
Cal Poly	3

Final
Sat • 3:00pm • Field 16
UC-Santa Barbara	1
Cal Poly	0

==== Women's consolation ====
Quarterfinals
Fri • 4:00pm • Field 8
Colorado Mines	0
Arizona	4
Fri • 4:00pm • Field 9
San Diego State	1
Virginia	0
Fri • 4:00pm • Field 8
Delaware	2
Indiana	1
Fri • 4:00pm • Field 9
Colorado State	1
Ohio State	2

Semifinals
Sat • 8:00am • Field 17
Arizona	2
San Diego State	0
Sat • 8:00am • Field 18
Delaware	1
Ohio State	3

Final
Sat • 1:00pm • Field 18
Arizona	0
Ohio State	1

=== Men's open ===
Quarterfinals
Fri • 2:00pm • Field 11
Penn	0
Northeastern	3
Fri • 4:00pm • Field 11
Colorado "Black"	1
Texas "B"	3
Fri • 4:00pm • Field 12
UC-San Diego (pen.)	2 (4)
San Diego State	2 (3)
Fri • 2:00pm • Field 12
USC (pen.)	0 (3)
Cal Poly "B"	0 (2)

Semifinals
Sat • 8:00am • Field 11
Northeastern	0
Texas "B"	2
Sat • 8:00am • Field 12
UC-San Diego (pen.)	0 (5)
USC	0 (4)

Final
Sat • 1:00pm • Field 14
Texas "B"	0
UC-San Diego	5

=== Women's open ===
Quarterfinals
Fri • 6:00pm • Field 11
Illinois (pen.)	0 (4)
Colorado "Black"	0 (2)
Fri • 8:00pm • Field 11
JMU	0
Missouri	2
Fri • 8:00pm • Field 12
UC-Berkeley (pen.)	0 (5)
Oregon	0 (4)
Fri • 6:00pm • Field 12
Salt Lake CC	0
USC	2

Semifinals
Sat • 8:00am • Field 13
Illinois	0
Missouri	2
Sat • 8:00am • Field 14
UC-Berkeley	3
USC	0

Final
Sat • 1:00pm • Field 13
Missouri	2
UC-Berkeley	0
