= 2010 NIRSA National Soccer Championship =

- League: NIRSA
- Sport: Soccer
- Site: Reach 11 Sports Complex; Phoenix, Arizona
- Duration: November 18–20, 2010
- Teams: 24 (men's championship); 24 (women's championship); 16 (men's open); 16 (women's open)
- Results: Official Results

Men's Championship Division
- Score: 3–1
- Champion: Colorado (2nd title, 2nd title game)
- Runners-up: Missouri (1st title game)
- Season MVP: Connor Hutchinson (Colorado)

Women's Championship Division
- Score: 1–1 (a.e.t.); 5–4 (pen.)
- Champion: UC-Santa Barbara (5th title, 6th title game)
- Runners-up: Texas (1st title game)
- Season MVP: Tannia Hernandez (UC-Santa Barbara)

Men's Open Division
- Score: 2–1 (a.e.t.)
- Champion: Cal Poly "B" (1st title, 1st title game)
- Runners-up: JMU (5th title game)
- Season MVP: Brian Romag (Cal Poly "B")

Women's Open Division
- Score: 1–0
- Champion: Illinois (1st title, 1st title game)
- Runners-up: Colorado "Black" (3rd title game)
- Top seed: Meagan Reitz (Illinois)

NIRSA national soccer championships seasons
- ← 2009 2011 →

The 2010 NIRSA national soccer championship was the 17th NIRSA National Soccer Championships, the annual national championships for United States-based, collegiate club soccer teams organized by NIRSA. It took place at Reach 11 Sports Complex, in Phoenix, Arizona from Thursday, November 18 to Saturday, November 20, 2010.

== Overview ==
=== Men's championship ===
In the finals, 2005 champions Colorado would face finals debutants Missouri. Coming into the finals, both teams won their Sweet 16 matchup 1–0. While Colorado won their next two games against Northwestern and Arizona, respectively, by 3 goals each, Missouri needed a 10-round penalty shootout against Cal Poly in the quarterfinals and a late second half goal against Texas in the semifinals. In the finals, Colorado started early with a goal in the 18th minute by eventual MVP Connor Hutchinson then doubled their advantage right at the end of the first half with a goal from Anthony Smoller in the 40th minute. Conner Hutchinson added a third goal 5 minutes prior to the end of the game, but a last minute PK from Missouri's Shane Rasch would be the last meaningful action of the match as Colorado claimed a 3–1 victory and their second national title.

=== Women's championship ===
In the finals, the three time reigning champions, UC-Santa Barbara, were looking to claim their fourth straight title and fifth overall against finals debutants Texas. Coming into the finals, Texas would have to overcome a 1–0 deficit in the round of 16 against North Carolina, then would require penalties against UCLA in the quarterfinals and finally scored a game-winning second half goal in a 1–0 game against rivals Texas A&M in the semifinals. Meanwhile, after a dominant 4–0 victory in the round of 16 against Cornell, Florida, who won their first game in overtime, forfeited, sending UC-Santa Barbara directly to the semifinals against Penn State; a rematch of the previous tournament's finals. UC-Santa Barbara would also dominate this game, winning 3–0. In the finals, Emily Gross would open the scoring for Texas in the 10th minute, the first time UC-Santa Barbara would trail this tournament, and would remain at 1–0 until Kelsey Mulcahy of UC-Santa Barbara tied the game in the 55th minute. The score would remain tied after regulation and extra time, meaning the game would go to penalties. Texas would kick first and have their first attempt saved. The following four kicks would be converted, but UC-Santa Barbara would miss in the third round making the score 2–2. Both teams scored their attempts in the fourth and fifth rounds, meaning a sudden-death sixth round would be required. A block from UC-Santa Barbara's goalkeeper and a goal from Natalie Lemonnier would see UC-Santa Barbara win 4–3 on penalties, giving them their fifth national title and fourth straight. This victory also saw them be the only women's championship team with at least 5 titles, overtaking Colorado and Michigan who had 4 titles each, and became only the second team across all four divisions to win four straight tournaments (the first being BYU men's championship run from 1996 to 1999). UC-Santa Barbara's Tannia Hernandez would be named women's championship MVP.

=== Men's open ===
In the finals, reigning champions JMU would face Cal Poly "B" in a rematch from Group A which Cal Poly "B" won 3–2. The game would be tied 1–1 at the end of regulation, meaning a 15-minute sudden victory overtime would be played. Cal Poly "B" would score and secure their first men's open title. Brian Romag of Cal Poly would go on to be named men's open MVP.

=== Women's open ===
In the finals, 2001 women's open champions Colorado "Black" would face Illinois who were in their first open finals. Coming into the finals, Colorado "Black" had to beat Northeastern 2–1, then last year's runners-up Oregon 1–0. Meanwhile, Illinois had to beat Miami (FL) 4–3 then Missouri, the team who defeated reigning champs JMU, in a penalty shootout 4–3 after the game was tied 1–1 after regulation and extra time. In the finals, Illinois would score the lone goal of the match and claim their first women's open title. Illinois' Megan Reitz would be named women's open MVP.

== Format ==
The competition consisted of 80 teams: 48 championship division teams and 32 open division teams. Each of these divisions were further divided into two equal sized divisions for men and women. The championship division divided teams into eight groups of three teams each while the open division divided teams into four groups of four teams each, both engaging in a round-robin tournament that determined teams able to advance to a knockout stage. Pool play games were two 40-minute halves, separated by a seven-minute halftime and utilized the three points for a win system. After group stage play, the two highest ranked teams from each group advanced to their respective knockout stage. In the championship division, the third placed team advanced to a consolation bracket while in the open division, the third and fourth placed teams were eliminated.

Tie-breaking criteria for group play
The ranking of teams in each group was based on the following criteria in order:
1. Highest number of points
2. Winner of head-to-head competition
3. Greatest goal difference
  - Maximum ± 5 goal difference per match
4. Most goals scored
5. Most shutouts

In a tie breaking scenario involving more than 2 teams, the tiebreaker procedure would begin. If one team is identified as different and both remaining teams are still tied, the tie breaker procedure is restarted.

If a tie still remained after the first 5 criteria, the following was used to break a tie:

1. NCAA kicks from the mark
  - If there was a three-way tie, a coin-flip would be conducted. The two teams that chose the same outcome would compete in kicks from the mark between each other. The winner would compete with the last remaining team in kicks from the mark
  - If there's a four-way tie, a drawing of lots would be conducted (only could occur in open division)

Knockout stage games also consisted of two 40-minute halves. The round of 16 and quarterfinals were separated by a seven-minute halftime while the semifinals and finals had a ten-minute halftime. Knockout stage games needed to declare a winner, therefore if a game was tied at the end of regulation, one 15-minute, golden-goal overtime period would begin. If still tied after overtime, kicks from the mark would determine the winner.

== Qualification and selections ==
Each of the six regions received three automatic bids for both the men's and women's championship that they awarded to its members. The final six bids were considered "at-large", and were given out by NIRSA to teams, typically based on their regional tournament results and RPI.

The 32 remaining teams participated in the open division, chosen on a first-come first-serve basis online on September 22, 2010.

=== Men's championship ===
Automatic bid
Region	Team	Appearance	Last Bid
I	Delaware	6th	2009
I	Penn	5th	2008
I	UMass	1st	Never
II	North Carolina	9th	2009
II	Florida	5th	2009
II	UCF	1st	Never
III	Michigan	9th	2009
III	Western Michigan	2nd	2004
III	Cincinnati	1st	Never
IV	Texas	12th	2007
IV	Texas A&M	11th	2009
IV	Texas Tech	7th	2007
V	Colorado State	14th	2009
V	Colorado	11th	2009
V	Colorado Mines	1st	Never
VI	Weber State	10th	2009
VI	Arizona	9th	2008
VI	UCLA	3rd	2008

At-large bids
Region	Team	Appearance	Last Bid
I	Navy	8th	2009
II	Virginia	6th	2009
III	Northwestern	1st	Never
IV	Missouri	5th	2009
V	Minnesota	9th	2009
VI	Cal Poly	2nd	2009

=== Women's championship ===
Automatic bids
Region	Team	Appearance	Last Bid
I	Penn State	16th	2009
I	Delaware	8th	2009
I	Cornell	5th	2009
II	Virginia Tech	10th	2009
II	Virginia	5th	2009
III	Michigan	12th	2009
III	Ohio State	10th	2009
III	Purdue	8th	2005
IV	Texas A&M	12th	2009
IV	Texas	11th	2009
IV	Baylor	7th	2008
V	Colorado	16th	2009
V	Colorado State	14th	2009
VI	UC-Santa Barbara	10th	2009
VI	Arizona	6th	2009
VI	Arizona State	1st	Never

At-large bids
Region	Team	Appearance	Last Bid
I	Pitt	1st	Never
I	College of New Jersey	2nd	2009
II	Florida	9th	2009
II	North Carolina	7th	2008
III	Marquette	2nd	2009
IV	Texas State	3rd	2009
VI	UCLA	4th	2009
VI	UC-Berkeley	2nd	2004

=== Men's open ===
Participating teams
Region	Num	Team(s)
I	5	Boston College, SUNY Cortland, Towson, UConn, Villanova
II	3	JMU, Miami (FL), Virginia Tech
III	0	
IV	2	Texas "B", Kansas
V	4	Fort Lewis, Iowa State, Colorado "Black", Air Force
VI	2	Cal Poly "B", Central Washington

=== Women's open ===
Region	Num	Team(s)
I	4	Boston College, Northeastern, Vermont, Villanova
II	3	JMU, Miami (FL), Vanderbilt
III	1	Illinois
IV	2	Kansas, Missouri
V	2	Iowa State, Colorado "Black"
VI	4	Salt Lake CC, San Diego State, Oregon, Northern Arizona

== Group stage ==
=== Men's championship ===
Group A
Pos	Team	Pld	W	D	L	GF	GA	GD	Pts	Qualification
1	Texas A&M	2	2	0	0	3	0	+3	6	Advanced to knockout stage
2	Weber State	2	1	0	1	3	2	+1	3	Advanced to knockout stage
3	Colorado Mines	2	0	0	2	0	4	−4	0	Consolation

Scores

8:00am MST	Weber State	0–2	Texas A&M	Field 3
Thu, November 18		Report		Stadium: Reach 11 Sports Complex; Phoenix, Arizona

1:15pm MST	Texas A&M	1–0	Colorado Mines	Field 3
Thu, November 18		Report		Stadium: Reach 11 Sports Complex; Phoenix, Arizona

6:30pm MST	Colorado Mines	0–3	Weber State	Field 3
Thu, November 18		Report		Stadium: Reach 11 Sports Complex; Phoenix, Arizona

Group B
Pos	Team	Pld	W	D	L	GF	GA	GD	Pts	Qualification
1	Western Michigan	2	1	0	1	2	1	+1	3	Advanced to knockout stage
2	UCF	2	1	0	1	4	4	0	3	Advanced to knockout stage
3	Minnesota	2	1	0	1	3	4	−1	3	Consolation

Scores

8:00am MST	WMU	2–0	UCF	Field 4
Thu, November 18		Report		Stadium: Reach 11 Sports Complex; Phoenix, Arizona

1:15pm MST	UCF	4–2	Minnesota	Field 4
Thu, November 18		Report		Stadium: Reach 11 Sports Complex; Phoenix, Arizona

6:30pm MST	Minnesota	1–0	WMU	Field 4
Thu, November 18		Report		Stadium: Reach 11 Sports Complex; Phoenix, Arizona

Group C
Pos	Team	Pld	W	D	L	GF	GA	GD	Pts	Qualification
1	Northwestern	2	1	1	0	5	2	+3	4	Advanced to knockout stage
2	Texas	2	1	1	0	4	3	+1	4	Advanced to knockout stage
3	UCLA	2	0	0	2	3	7	−4	0	Consolation

Scores

8:00am MST	Texas	3–2	UCLA	Field 5
Thu, November 18		Report		Stadium: Reach 11 Sports Complex; Phoenix, Arizona

1:15pm MST	UCLA	1–4	Northwestern	Field 5
Thu, November 18		Report		Stadium: Reach 11 Sports Complex; Phoenix, Arizona

6:30pm MST	Northwestern	1–1	Texas	Field 5
Thu, November 18		Report		Stadium: Reach 11 Sports Complex; Phoenix, Arizona

Group D
Pos	Team	Pld	W	D	L	GF	GA	GD	Pts	Qualification
1	Florida	2	2	0	0	3	0	+3	6	Advanced to knockout stage
2	Missouri	2	1	0	1	1	1	0	3	Advanced to knockout stage
3	UMass	2	0	0	2	0	3	−3	0	Consolation

Scores

8:00am MST	Florida	2–0	UMass	Field 6
Thu, November 18		Report		Stadium: Reach 11 Sports Complex; Phoenix, Arizona

1:15pm MST	UMass	0–1	Missouri	Field 6
Thu, November 18		Report		Stadium: Reach 11 Sports Complex; Phoenix, Arizona

6:30pm MST	Missouri	0–1	Florida	Field 6
Thu, November 18		Report		Stadium: Reach 11 Sports Complex; Phoenix, Arizona

Group E
Pos	Team	Pld	W	D	L	GF	GA	GD	Pts	Qualification
1	Cincinnati	2	2	0	0	3	1	+2	6	Advanced to knockout stage
2	Cal Poly	2	1	0	1	2	1	+1	3	Advanced to knockout stage
3	Delaware	2	0	0	2	1	4	−3	0	Consolation

Scores

9:45am MST	Delaware	1–2	Cincinnati	Field 3
Thu, November 18		Report		Stadium: Reach 11 Sports Complex; Phoenix, Arizona

3:00pm MST	Cincinnati	1–0	Cal Poly	Field 3
Thu, November 18		Report		Stadium: Reach 11 Sports Complex; Phoenix, Arizona

8:15pm MST	Cal Poly	2–0	Delaware	Field 3
Thu, November 18		Report		Stadium: Reach 11 Sports Complex; Phoenix, Arizona

Group F
Pos	Team	Pld	W	D	L	GF	GA	GD	Pts	Qualification
1	Michigan	2	2	0	0	5	2	+3	6	Advanced to knockout stage
2	Virginia	2	1	0	1	3	3	0	3	Advanced to knockout stage
3	Texas Tech	2	0	0	2	2	5	−3	0	Consolation

Scores

9:45am MST	Michigan	3–1	Texas Tech	Field 4
Thu, November 18		Report		Stadium: Reach 11 Sports Complex; Phoenix, Arizona

3:00pm MST	Texas Tech	1–2	Virginia	Field 4
Thu, November 18		Report		Stadium: Reach 11 Sports Complex; Phoenix, Arizona

8:15pm MST	Virginia	1–2	Michigan	Field 4
Thu, November 18		Report		Stadium: Reach 11 Sports Complex; Phoenix, Arizona

Group G
Pos	Team	Pld	W	D	L	GF	GA	GD	Pts	Qualification
1	North Carolina	2	2	0	0	5	0	+5	6	Advanced to knockout stage
2	Colorado	2	1	0	1	4	4	0	3	Advanced to knockout stage
3	Penn	2	0	0	2	2	7	−5	0	Consolation

Scores

9:45am MST	Colorado	4–2	Penn	Field 5
Thu, November 18		Report		Stadium: Reach 11 Sports Complex; Phoenix, Arizona

3:00pm MST	Penn	0–3	UNC	Field 5
Thu, November 18		Report		Stadium: Reach 11 Sports Complex; Phoenix, Arizona

8:15pm MST	UNC	2–0	Colorado	Field 5
Thu, November 18		Report		Stadium: Reach 11 Sports Complex; Phoenix, Arizona

Group H
Pos	Team	Pld	W	D	L	GF	GA	GD	Pts	Qualification
1	Arizona	2	1	1	0	2	1	+1	4	Advanced to knockout stage
2	Navy	2	1	1	0	3	1	+2	4	Advanced to knockout stage
3	Colorado State	2	0	0	2	0	3	−3	0	Consolation

Scores

9:45am MST	Arizona	1–0	Colorado State	Field 6
Thu, November 18		Report		Stadium: Reach 11 Sports Complex; Phoenix, Arizona

3:00pm MST	Colorado State	0–2	Navy	Field 6
Thu, November 18		Report		Stadium: Reach 11 Sports Complex; Phoenix, Arizona

8:15pm MST	Navy	1–1	Arizona	Field 6
Thu, November 18		Report		Stadium: Reach 11 Sports Complex; Phoenix, Arizona

=== Women's championship ===
Group A
Pos	Team	Pld	W	D	L	GF	GA	GD	Pts	Qualification
1	UC-Santa Barbara	2	2	0	0	7	1	+6	6	Advanced to knockout stage
2	The College of New Jersey	2	0	1	1	0	2	−2	1	Advanced to knockout stage
3	Virginia Tech	2	0	1	1	1	5	−4	1	Consolation

Scores

8:00am MST	UCSB	5–1	Virginia Tech	Field 7
Thu, November 18		Report		Stadium: Reach 11 Sports Complex; Phoenix, Arizona

1:15pm MST	Virginia Tech	0–0	TCNJ	Field 7
Thu, November 18		Report		Stadium: Reach 11 Sports Complex; Phoenix, Arizona

6:30pm MST	TCNJ	0–2	UCSB	Field 7
Thu, November 18		Report		Stadium: Reach 11 Sports Complex; Phoenix, Arizona

Group B
Pos	Team	Pld	W	D	L	GF	GA	GD	Pts	Qualification
1	Marquette	2	1	1	0	4	3	+1	4	Advanced to knockout stage
2	Virginia	2	0	2	0	3	3	0	2	Advanced to knockout stage
3	Arizona State	2	0	1	1	2	3	−1	1	Consolation

Scores

8:00am MST	Virginia	1–1	Arizona State	Field 8
Thu, November 18		Report		Stadium: Reach 11 Sports Complex; Phoenix, Arizona

1:15pm MST	Arizona State	1–2	Marquette	Field 8
Thu, November 18		Report		Stadium: Reach 11 Sports Complex; Phoenix, Arizona

6:30pm MST	Marquette	2–2	Virginia	Field 8
Thu, November 18		Report		Stadium: Reach 11 Sports Complex; Phoenix, Arizona

Group C
Pos	Team	Pld	W	D	L	GF	GA	GD	Pts	Qualification
1	UCLA	2	2	0	0	4	2	+2	6	Advanced to knockout stage
2	Penn State	2	1	0	1	4	3	+1	3	Advanced to knockout stage
3	Purdue	2	0	0	2	0	3	−3	0	Consolation

Scores

8:00am MST	Penn State	2–0	Purdue	Field 9
Thu, November 18		Report		Stadium: Reach 11 Sports Complex; Phoenix, Arizona

1:15pm MST	Purdue	0–1	UCLA	Field 9
Thu, November 18		Report		Stadium: Reach 11 Sports Complex; Phoenix, Arizona

6:30pm MST	UCLA	3–2	Penn State	Field 9
Thu, November 18		Report		Stadium: Reach 11 Sports Complex; Phoenix, Arizona

Group D
Pos	Team	Pld	W	D	L	GF	GA	GD	Pts	Qualification
1	Texas A&M	2	1	1	0	4	3	+1	4	Advanced to knockout stage
2	Cornell	2	0	2	0	1	1	0	2	Advanced to knockout stage
3	Michigan	2	0	1	1	2	3	−1	1	Consolation

Scores

8:00am MST	Michigan	2–3	Texas A&M	Field 10
Thu, November 18		Report		Stadium: Reach 11 Sports Complex; Phoenix, Arizona

1:15pm MST	Texas A&M	1–1	Cornell	Field 10
Thu, November 18		Report		Stadium: Reach 11 Sports Complex; Phoenix, Arizona

6:30pm MST	Cornell	0–0	Michigan	Field 10
Thu, November 18		Report		Stadium: Reach 11 Sports Complex; Phoenix, Arizona

Group E
Pos	Team	Pld	W	D	L	GF	GA	GD	Pts	Qualification
1	Colorado	2	1	1	0	4	2	+2	4	Advanced to knockout stage
2	Florida	2	1	0	1	5	4	+1	3	Advanced to knockout stage
3	Baylor	2	0	1	1	0	3	−3	1	Consolation

Scores

9:45am MST	Colorado	0–0	Baylor	Field 7
Thu, November 18		Report		Stadium: Reach 11 Sports Complex; Phoenix, Arizona

3:00pm MST	Baylor	0–3	Florida	Field 7
Thu, November 18		Report		Stadium: Reach 11 Sports Complex; Phoenix, Arizona

8:15pm MST	Florida	2–4	Colorado	Field 7
Thu, November 18		Report		Stadium: Reach 11 Sports Complex; Phoenix, Arizona

Group F
Pos	Team	Pld	W	D	L	GF	GA	GD	Pts	Qualification
1	Texas	2	1	1	0	5	4	+1	4	Advanced to knockout stage
2	Pittsburgh	2	0	2	0	3	3	0	2	Advanced to knockout stage
3	UC-Berkeley	2	0	1	1	1	2	−1	1	Consolation

Scores

9:45am MST	Texas	3–3	Pittsburgh	Field 8
Thu, November 18		Report		Stadium: Reach 11 Sports Complex; Phoenix, Arizona

3:00pm MST	Pittsburgh	0–0	UC-Berkeley	Field 8
Thu, November 18		Report		Stadium: Reach 11 Sports Complex; Phoenix, Arizona

8:15pm MST	UC-Berkeley	1–2	Texas	Field 8
Thu, November 18		Report		Stadium: Reach 11 Sports Complex; Phoenix, Arizona

Group G
Pos	Team	Pld	W	D	L	GF	GA	GD	Pts	Qualification
1	Arizona	2	0	2	0	2	2	0	2	Advanced to knockout stage
2	North Carolina	2	0	2	0	1	1	0	2	Advanced to knockout stage
3	Colorado State	2	0	2	0	1	1	0	2	Consolation

Scores

9:45am MST	Arizona	1–1	Colorado State	Field 9
Thu, November 18		Report		Stadium: Reach 11 Sports Complex; Phoenix, Arizona

3:00pm MST	Colorado State	0–0	UNC	Field 9
Thu, November 18		Report		Stadium: Reach 11 Sports Complex; Phoenix, Arizona

8:15pm MST	UNC	1–1	Arizona	Field 9
Thu, November 18		Report		Stadium: Reach 11 Sports Complex; Phoenix, Arizona

12:00pm MST	Colorado State	6–7; Kicks from the mark	UNC	Field 9
Fri, November 19		Report		Stadium: Reach 11 Sports Complex; Phoenix, Arizona

Group H
Pos	Team	Pld	W	D	L	GF	GA	GD	Pts	Qualification
1	Texas State	2	1	1	0	4	2	+2	4	Advanced to knockout stage
2	Ohio State	2	1	0	1	4	5	−1	3	Advanced to knockout stage
3	Delaware	2	0	1	1	3	4	−1	1	Consolation

Scores

9:45am MST	Delaware	2–3	Ohio State	Field 10
Thu, November 18		Report		Stadium: Reach 11 Sports Complex; Phoenix, Arizona

3:00pm MST	Ohio State	1–3	Texas State	Field 10
Thu, November 18		Report		Stadium: Reach 11 Sports Complex; Phoenix, Arizona

8:15pm MST	Texas State	1–1	Delaware	Field 10
Thu, November 18		Report		Stadium: Reach 11 Sports Complex; Phoenix, Arizona

=== Men's open ===
Group A
Pos	Team	Pld	W	D	L	GF	GA	GD	Pts	Qualification
1	Cal Poly “B”	3	3	0	0	9	2	+7	9	Advanced to knockout stage
2	JMU	3	2	0	1	9	3	+6	6	Advanced to knockout stage
3	Boston College	3	1	0	2	3	7	−4	3	
4	Fort Lewis	3	0	0	3	2	11	−9	0	

Scores

8:00am MST	JMU	4–0	Fort Lewis	Field 11
Thu, November 18		Report		Stadium: Reach 11 Sports Complex; Phoenix, Arizona

8:00am MST	Boston College	0–2	Cal Poly “B”	Field 12
Thu, November 18		Report		Stadium: Reach 11 Sports Complex; Phoenix, Arizona

3:00pm MST	Cal Poly “B”	3–2	JMU	Field 11
Thu, November 18		Report		Stadium: Reach 11 Sports Complex; Phoenix, Arizona

3:00pm MST	Fort Lewis	2–3	Boston College	Field 12
Thu, November 18		Report		Stadium: Reach 11 Sports Complex; Phoenix, Arizona

8:00am MST	JMU	3–0	Boston College	Field 11
Fri, November 19		Report		Stadium: Reach 11 Sports Complex; Phoenix, Arizona

8:00am MST	Cal Poly “B”	4–0	Fort Lewis	Field 12
Fri, November 19		Report		Stadium: Reach 11 Sports Complex; Phoenix, Arizona

Group B
Pos	Team	Pld	W	D	L	GF	GA	GD	Pts	Qualification
1	Virginia Tech	3	2	0	1	5	2	+3	6	Advanced to knockout stage
2	Colorado “Black”	3	1	2	0	2	1	+1	5	Advanced to knockout stage
3	Iowa State	3	0	2	1	1	3	−2	2	
4	SUNY Cortland	3	0	2	1	1	3	−2	2	

Scores

8:00am MST	Virginia Tech	2–0	SUNY Cortland	Field 13
Thu, November 18		Report		Stadium: Reach 11 Sports Complex; Phoenix, Arizona

8:00am MST	Colorado “Black”	0–0	Iowa State	Field 14
Thu, November 18		Report		Stadium: Reach 11 Sports Complex; Phoenix, Arizona

3:00pm MST	Iowa State	1–3	Virginia Tech	Field 13
Thu, November 18		Report		Stadium: Reach 11 Sports Complex; Phoenix, Arizona

3:00pm MST	SUNY Cortland	1–1	Colorado “Black”	Field 14
Thu, November 18		Report		Stadium: Reach 11 Sports Complex; Phoenix, Arizona

8:00am MST	Virginia Tech	0–1	Colorado “Black”	Field 13
Fri, November 19		Report		Stadium: Reach 11 Sports Complex; Phoenix, Arizona

8:00am MST	Iowa State	0–0	SUNY Cortland	Field 14
Fri, November 19		Report		Stadium: Reach 11 Sports Complex; Phoenix, Arizona

Group C
Pos	Team	Pld	W	D	L	GF	GA	GD	Pts	Qualification
1	Miami (FL)	3	3	0	0	8	1	+7	9	Advanced to knockout stage
2	Texas “B”	3	2	0	1	5	3	+2	6	Advanced to knockout stage
3	Air Force	3	1	0	2	4	8	−4	3	
4	Villanova	3	0	0	3	2	7	−5	0	

Scores

9:45am MST	Villanova	0–1	Texas “B”	Field 11
Thu, November 18		Report		Stadium: Reach 11 Sports Complex; Phoenix, Arizona

9:45am MST	Miami	3–0	Air Force	Field 12
Thu, November 18		Report		Stadium: Reach 11 Sports Complex; Phoenix, Arizona

4:45pm MST	Air Force	3–1	Villanova	Field 11
Thu, November 18		Report		Stadium: Reach 11 Sports Complex; Phoenix, Arizona

4:45pm MST	Texas “B”	0–2	Miami	Field 12
Thu, November 18		Report		Stadium: Reach 11 Sports Complex; Phoenix, Arizona

10:00am MST	Villanova	1–3	Miami	Field 11
Fri, November 19		Report		Stadium: Reach 11 Sports Complex; Phoenix, Arizona

10:00am MST	Air Force	1–4	Texas “B”	Field 12
Fri, November 19		Report		Stadium: Reach 11 Sports Complex; Phoenix, Arizona

Group D
Pos	Team	Pld	W	D	L	GF	GA	GD	Pts	Qualification
1	Kansas	3	2	1	0	4	0	+4	7	Advanced to knockout stage
2	UConn	3	1	2	0	4	0	+4	5	Advanced to knockout stage
3	Towson	3	0	0	3	1	8	−7	0	
4	Central Washington	3	1	1	1	3	4	−1	4	

Scores

9:45am MST	UConn	0–0	Central Wash	Field 13
Thu, November 18		Report		Stadium: Reach 11 Sports Complex; Phoenix, Arizona

9:45am MST	Kansas	1–0	Towson	Field 14
Thu, November 18		Report		Stadium: Reach 11 Sports Complex; Phoenix, Arizona

4:45pm MST	Towson	0–4	UConn	Field 13
Thu, November 18		Report		Stadium: Reach 11 Sports Complex; Phoenix, Arizona

4:45pm MST	Central Wash	0–3	Kansas	Field 14
Thu, November 18		Report		Stadium: Reach 11 Sports Complex; Phoenix, Arizona

10:00am MST	UConn	0–0	Kansas	Field 13
Fri, November 19		Report		Stadium: Reach 11 Sports Complex; Phoenix, Arizona

10:00am MST	Towson	1–3	Central Wash	Field 14
Fri, November 19		Report		Stadium: Reach 11 Sports Complex; Phoenix, Arizona

=== Women's open ===
Group A
Pos	Team	Pld	W	D	L	GF	GA	GD	Pts	Qualification
1	JMU	3	3	0	0	14	3	+11	9	Advanced to knockout stage
2	Kansas	3	2	0	1	4	6	−2	6	Advanced to knockout stage
3	Salt Lake CC	3	1	0	2	4	8	−4	3	
4	Villanova	3	0	0	3	2	7	−5	0	

Scores

11:30am MST	JMU	6–2	Salt Lake CC	Field 15
Thu, November 18		Report		Stadium: Reach 11 Sports Complex; Phoenix, Arizona

11:30am MST	Villanova	1–2	Kansas	Field 16
Thu, November 18		Report		Stadium: Reach 11 Sports Complex; Phoenix, Arizona

6:30pm MST	Kansas	1–5	JMU	Field 15
Thu, November 18		Report		Stadium: Reach 11 Sports Complex; Phoenix, Arizona

6:30pm MST	Salt Lake CC	2–1	Villanova	Field 16
Thu, November 18		Report		Stadium: Reach 11 Sports Complex; Phoenix, Arizona

12:00pm MST	JMU	3–0	Villanova	Field 15
Fri, November 19		Report		Stadium: Reach 11 Sports Complex; Phoenix, Arizona

12:00pm MST	Kansas	1–0	Salt Lake CC	Field 16
Fri, November 19		Report		Stadium: Reach 11 Sports Complex; Phoenix, Arizona

Group B
Pos	Team	Pld	W	D	L	GF	GA	GD	Pts	Qualification
1	Oregon	3	3	0	0	11	0	+10	9	Advanced to knockout stage
2	Missouri	3	2	0	1	5	2	+3	6	Advanced to knockout stage
3	Boston College	3	1	0	2	2	4	−2	3	
4	Iowa State	3	0	0	3	0	12	−11	0	

Scores

11:30am MST	Oregon	6–0	Iowa State	Field 17
Thu, November 18		Report		Stadium: Reach 11 Sports Complex; Phoenix, Arizona

11:30am MST	Boston College	0–1	Missouri	Field 18
Thu, November 18		Report		Stadium: Reach 11 Sports Complex; Phoenix, Arizona

6:30pm MST	Missouri	0–2	Oregon	Field 17
Thu, November 18		Report		Stadium: Reach 11 Sports Complex; Phoenix, Arizona

6:30pm MST	Iowa State	0–2	Boston College	Field 18
Thu, November 18		Report		Stadium: Reach 11 Sports Complex; Phoenix, Arizona

12:00pm MST	Oregon	3–0	Boston College	Field 17
Fri, November 19		Report		Stadium: Reach 11 Sports Complex; Phoenix, Arizona

12:00pm MST	Missouri	4–0	Iowa State	Field 18
Fri, November 19		Report		Stadium: Reach 11 Sports Complex; Phoenix, Arizona

Group C
Pos	Team	Pld	W	D	L	GF	GA	GD	Pts	Qualification
1	Illinois	3	3	0	0	8	1	+7	9	Advanced to knockout stage
2	Northeastern	3	2	0	1	5	2	+3	6	Advanced to knockout stage
3	San Diego State	3	1	0	2	3	5	−2	3	
4	Vanderbilt	3	0	0	3	0	8	−8	0	

Scores

1:15pm MST	SDSU	1–2	Northeastern	Field 15
Thu, November 18		Report		Stadium: Reach 11 Sports Complex; Phoenix, Arizona

1:15pm MST	Vanderbilt	0–4	Illinois	Field 16
Thu, November 18		Report		Stadium: Reach 11 Sports Complex; Phoenix, Arizona

8:15pm MST	Illinois	3–1	SDSU	Field 15
Thu, November 18		Report		Stadium: Reach 11 Sports Complex; Phoenix, Arizona

8:15pm MST	Northeastern	3–0	Vanderbilt	Field 16
Thu, November 18		Report		Stadium: Reach 11 Sports Complex; Phoenix, Arizona

2:00pm MST	SDSU	1–0	Vanderbilt	Field 15
Fri, November 19		Report		Stadium: Reach 11 Sports Complex; Phoenix, Arizona

2:00pm MST	Illinois	1–0	Northeastern	Field 16
Fri, November 19		Report		Stadium: Reach 11 Sports Complex; Phoenix, Arizona

Group D
Pos	Team	Pld	W	D	L	GF	GA	GD	Pts	Qualification
1	Colorado “Black”	3	3	0	0	5	1	+4	9	Advanced to knockout stage
2	Miami	3	2	0	1	7	1	+6	6	Advanced to knockout stage
3	Vermont	3	1	0	2	3	7	−4	3	
4	Northern Arizona	3	0	0	3	0	6	−6	0	

Scores

1:15pm MST	Colorado “Black”	1–0	Northern Arizona	Field 17
Thu, November 18		Report		Stadium: Reach 11 Sports Complex; Phoenix, Arizona

1:15pm MST	Miami	4–0	Vermont	Field 18
Thu, November 18		Report		Stadium: Reach 11 Sports Complex; Phoenix, Arizona

8:15pm MST	Vermont	1–3	Colorado “Black”	Field 17
Thu, November 18		Report		Stadium: Reach 11 Sports Complex; Phoenix, Arizona

8:15pm MST	Northern Arizona	0–3	Miami	Field 18
Thu, November 18		Report		Stadium: Reach 11 Sports Complex; Phoenix, Arizona

2:00pm MST	Colorado “Black”	1–0	Miami	Field 17
Fri, November 19		Report		Stadium: Reach 11 Sports Complex; Phoenix, Arizona

2:00pm MST	Vermont	2–0	Northern Arizona	Field 18
Fri, November 19		Report		Stadium: Reach 11 Sports Complex; Phoenix, Arizona

== Tournament bracket ==
=== Men's championship ===
Sweet 16
Fri • 10:00am • Field 3
Texas A&M	0
Missouri	1
Fri • 10:00am • Field 4
Navy	1
Cal Poly	2
Fri • 10:00am • Field 5
North Carolina	0
Virginia	1
Fri • 10:00am • Field 6
Western Michigan	1
Texas	4
Fri • 12:00pm • Field 3
Northwestern	1
UCF	0
Fri • 12:00pm • Field 4
Michigan	0
Colorado	1
Fri • 12:00pm • Field 5
Cincinnati	0
Arizona	2
Fri • 12:00pm • Field 6
Florida	1
Weber State	0

Quarterfinals
Fri • 4:00pm • Field 5
Missouri (pen.)	2 (9)
Cal Poly	2 (8)
Fri • 4:00pm • Field 6
Virginia	1
Texas (a.e.t.)	2
Fri • 6:00pm • Field 5
Northwestern	0
Colorado	3
Fri • 6:00pm • Field 6
Arizona (pen.)	2 (4)
Florida	2 (3)

Semifinals
Sat • 10:00am • Field 4
Missouri	1
Texas	0
Sat • 10:00am • Field 5
Colorado	4
Arizona	1

Final
Sat • 5:00pm • Field 2
Missouri	1
Colorado	3

==== Men's consolation ====
Quarterfinals
Fri • 6:00pm • Field 13
Colorado Mines	1
Delaware	5
Fri • 6:00pm • Field 14
Texas Tech	0
Minnesota	2
Fri • 8:00pm • Field 13
UCLA	5
Penn	0
Fri • 8:00pm • Field 14
Colorado State	2
UMass	1

Semifinals
Sat • 8:00am • Field 15
Delaware	0
Minnesota	2
Sat • 8:00am • Field 16
UCLA	2
Colorado State	0

Final
Sat • 1:00pm • Field 9
Minnesota	1
UCLA	0

=== Women's championship ===
Sweet 16
Fri • 10:00am • Field 7
UC-Santa Barbara	4
Cornell	0
Fri • 10:00am • Field 8
Texas State	2
Florida (a.e.t.)	3
Fri • 10:00am • Field 9
Arizona	1
Pitt	2
Fri • 10:00am • Field 10
Marquette	0
Penn State	1
Fri • 12:00pm • Field 7
UCLA	1
Virginia	0
Fri • 12:00pm • Field 8
Texas	2
North Carolina	1
Fri • 12:00pm • Field 9
Colorado	2
Ohio State	0
Fri • 12:00pm • Field 10
Texas A&M	2
TCNJ	0

Quarterfinals
Fri • 4:00pm • Field 8
UC-Santa Barbara	1
~~Florida~~ (Forfeit)	0
Fri • 4:00pm • Field 9
Pitt	0
Penn State	1
Fri • 6:00pm • Field 8
UCLA	1 (1)
Texas (pen.)	1 (3)
Fri • 6:00pm • Field 9
Colorado	1 (1)
Texas A&M (pen.)	1 (3)

Semifinals
Sat • 10:00am • Field 2
UC-Santa Barbara	3
Penn State	0
Sat • 10:00am • Field 3
Texas	1
Texas A&M	0

Final
Sat • 3:00pm • Field 2
UC-Santa Barbara (pen.)	1 (5)
Texas	1 (4)

==== Women's consolation ====
Quarterfinals
Fri • 6:00pm • Field 17
Virginia Tech	0 (3)
Baylor (pen.)	0 (4)
Fri • 6:00pm • Field 18
UC-Berkeley	0
Arizona State	1
Fri • 8:00pm • Field 17
Purdue	1
Colorado State	2
Fri • 8:00pm • Field 18
Delaware	0
Michigan	2

Semifinals
Sat • 8:00am • Field 17
Baylor	0
Arizona State	1
Sat • 8:00am • Field 18
Colorado State	0
Michigan	4

Final
Sat • 1:00pm • Field 10
Arizona State	1
Michigan	0

=== Men's open ===
Quarterfinals
Fri • 2:00pm • Field 13
Cal Poly "B"	2
Colorado "Black"	0
Fri • 2:00pm • Field 14
Miami	1
UConn	0
Fri • 4:00pm • Field 13
Kansas	1
Texas "B"	2
Fri • 4:00pm • Field 14
Virginia Tech	2
JMU	3

Semifinals
Sat • 8:00am • Field 6
Cal Poly "B"	2
Miami	1
Sat • 8:00am • Field 7
Texas "B"	0
JMU	3

Final
Sat • 1:00pm • Field 7
Cal Poly "B" (a.e.t.)	2
JMU	1

=== Women's open ===
Quarterfinals
Fri • 6:00pm • Field 15
JMU	0
Missouri	1
Fri • 6:00pm • Field 16
Illinois	4
Miami	3
Fri • 8:00pm • Field 15
Colorado "Black"	2
Northeastern	1
Fri • 8:00pm • Field 16
Oregon	4
Kansas	0

Semifinals
Sat • 8:00am • Field 9
Missouri	1 (3)
Illinois (pen.)	1 (4)
Sat • 8:00am • Field 10
Colorado "Black"	1
Oregon	0

Final
Sat • 1:00pm • Field 6
Illinois	1
Colorado "Black"	0
