= 2009 NIRSA National Soccer Championship =

- League: NIRSA
- Sport: Soccer
- Site: Reach 11 Sports Complex; Phoenix, Arizona
- Duration: November 19–21, 2009
- Teams: 24 (Championship); 16 (Open)
- Results: Official Results

Men's Championship Division
- Score: 0–0 (a.e.t.); 3–2 (pen.)
- Champion: Weber State (2nd title, 2nd title game)
- Runners-up: Florida (1st title game)
- Season MVP: Scott Whitesides (Weber State)

Women's Championship Division
- Score: 2–0
- Champion: UC-Santa Barbara (4th title, 5th title game)
- Runners-up: Penn State (4th title game)
- Season MVP: Alyssa Donika (UC-Santa Barbara)

Men's Open Division
- Score: 1–1 (a.e.t.); 6–5 (pen.)
- Champion: JMU (3rd title, 4th title game)
- Runners-up: San Diego State (1st title game)
- Season MVP: Brian Murphy (JMU)

Women's Open Division
- Score: 2–0
- Champion: JMU (1st title, 1st title game)
- Runners-up: Oregon (1st title game)
- Top seed: Maureen Finn (JMU)

NIRSA national soccer championships seasons
- ← 2008 2010 →

The 2009 NIRSA national soccer championship was the 16th NIRSA National Soccer Championships, the annual national championships for United States-based, collegiate club soccer teams organized by NIRSA. It took place at Reach 11 Sports Complex, in Phoenix, Arizona from Thursday, November 19 to Saturday, November 21, 2009.

== Overview ==
=== Men's championship ===
In the finals, the 2002 champions Weber State would face finals debutants Florida. Coming into the finals, despite losing their opening match 2–0 to Michigan, Florida would go on to win their next four games by an average of a 3-goal margin and wouldn't concede another goal. Meanwhile, after winning their opening match, Weber State would tie their group stage finale 0–0, win a 2–1 game over Georgia in the round of 16, require PKs over Texas A&M in the quarterfinals, and finally would score a late goal in a 2–1 win against Michigan in the semifinals.

In the finals, the score would remain 0–0 after regulation and extra time, meaning penalty kicks would determine the men's champion for the second time in three years. Weber State would kick first and get their first attempt saved. The next two kicks would be scored but after Florida hit the crossbar the score would be 1–1 after two rounds. The next two rounds would see zero kicks converted with a save, two misses, and a save respectively, meaning the score would remain 1–1 after 4 rounds. Both teams would score in the fifth round which meant an extra round of kicks were to be taken. After Weber State scored, eventual goalkeeper of the tournament, Jan Robbins, would save a third Florida attempt, sealing Weber State's 3–2 win in penalty kicks and secure their second men's championship title. Weber State's Scott Whitesides would be named men's championship MVP.

=== Women's championship ===
In the finals, a rematch of the 2001 championship game between Penn State and UC-Santa Barbara. Penn State won the 2001 championship 1-0 but UC-Santa Barbara was two-time reigning champions. Coming into the finals, UC-Santa Barbara would have a 4–0 loss in their group stage finale against Colorado but would wouldn't concede a goal in their next three games. Meanwhile, Penn State would only concede one goal in their five games, the only goal coming in the quarterfinals against Arizona.

In the finals, UC-Santa Barbara's Laura Capparilli would open the scoring in the 13th minute and a second goal from UCSB's Tannia Hernandez would be enough to see UC-Santa Barbara win 2–0 and secure their fourth women's championship title and third straight, making them the first women's championship team to win three consecutive titles. This win also saw them join Colorado and Michigan in being the only women's championship teams to have four titles. UC-Santa Barbara's Alyssa Donikia would be named women's championship MVP.

=== Men's open ===
In the finals, the only two-time men's open division champions, JMU, would face finals debutants San Diego State. Coming into the finals, JMU would require extra time against UConn in the quarterfinals but would win 6–2 in the semifinals over UCLA. Meanwhile, San Diego State would win their quarterfinal match against East Carolina 3–0 then defeat Villanova 2–1 in the semifinals. In the finals, the game would be tied 1–1 after regulation and extra time, which meant penalty kicks would determine the men's open title. JMU would win 6–5 in penalty kicks and secure their third men's open championship. JMU's Brian Murphy would be named men's open MVP.

=== Women's open ===
In the finals, Oregon would face JMU; the first women's open title for both teams. Coming into the finals, JMU would win their first two group stage games 6–0 and 8–0 respectively, followed by a 2–1 victory in their group stage finale against Boston College. Meanwhile, Oregon would also be undefeated but would tie their group stage finale against Colorado 0–0. Both teams would win their quarterfinal matchup and have a rematch against a group stage opponent in the semifinals. JMU would win their rematch 3–0 over Boston College while Oregon would require penalty kicks against Colorado "Black" after a 1–1 score line after regulation, which they would win 5–3. In the finals, JMU would win 2–0 and secure their first women's open title, meaning both open champions would represent the same school for the first time in tournament history. JMU's Maureen Finn would be named women's open MVP.

== Format ==
The competition consisted of 80 teams: 48 championship division teams and 32 open division teams. Each of these divisions were further divided into two equal sized divisions for men and women. The championship division divided teams into eight groups of three teams each while the open division divided teams into four groups of four teams each, both engaging in a round-robin tournament that determined teams able to advance to a knockout stage. Pool play games were two 40-minute halves, separated by a seven-minute halftime and utilized the three points for a win system. After group stage play, the two highest ranked teams from each group advanced to their respective knockout stage. In the championship division, the third placed team advanced to a consolation bracket while in the open division, the third and fourth placed teams were eliminated.

Tie-breaking criteria for group play
The ranking of teams in each group was based on the following criteria in order:
1. Highest number of points
2. Winner of head-to-head competition
3. Greatest goal difference
  - Maximum ± 5 goal difference per match
4. Most goals scored
5. Most shutouts

In a tie breaking scenario involving more than 2 teams, the tiebreaker procedure would begin. If one team is identified as different and both remaining teams are still tied, the tie breaker procedure is restarted.

If a tie still remained after the first 5 criteria, the following was used to break a tie:

1. NCAA kicks from the mark
  - If there was a three-way tie, a coin-flip would be conducted. The two teams that chose the same outcome would compete in kicks from the mark between each other. The winner would compete with the last remaining team in kicks from the mark
  - If there's a four-way tie, a drawing of lots would be conducted (only could occur in open division)

Knockout stage games also consisted of two 40-minute halves. The round of 16 and quarterfinals were separated by a seven-minute halftime while the semifinals and finals had a ten-minute halftime. Knockout stage games needed to declare a winner, therefore if a game was tied at the end of regulation, one 15-minute, golden-goal overtime period would begin. If still tied after overtime, kicks from the mark would determine the winner.

== Qualification and selections ==
Each of the six regions received three automatic bids for both the men's and women's championship that they awarded to its members. The final six bids were considered "at-large", and were given out by NIRSA to teams, typically based on their regional tournament results and RPI.

The 32 remaining teams participated in the open division, chosen on a first-come first-serve basis online on September 14, 2009 with a limit of 16 teams per gender division.

=== Men's championship ===
Participating teams
Region	Team	Appearance	Last Bid
I	Penn State	10th	2008
I	Navy	7th	2007
I	Delaware	5th	2005
I	Johns Hopkins	2nd	2008
II	North Carolina	8th	2008
II	Georgia	5th	2007
II	Virginia	5th	2008
II	Florida	4th	2008
III	Illinois	9th	2007
III	Michigan	8th	2007
III	Ohio State	6th	2008
III	Michigan State	4th	2008
III	UW Milwaukee	3rd	2008
IV	Texas A&M	10th	2008
IV	Missouri	4th	2008
IV	Texas State	4th	2008
V	Colorado State	13th	2008
V	Colorado	10th	2008
V	Minnesota	8th	2008
VI	Weber State	9th	2007
VI	UC Santa Barabara	7th	2008
VI	UC Berkeley	3rd	2004
VI	Arizona State	2nd	2003
VI	Cal Poly	1st	Never

=== Women's championship ===
Participating teams
Region	Team	Appearance	Last Bid
I	Penn State	15th	2008
I	Delaware	7th	2007
I	Cornell	4th	2008
I	College of New Jersey	1st	Never
II	Virginia Tech	9th	2008
II	Florida	8th	2008
II	Virginia	4th	2006
III	Michigan	11th	2008
III	Ohio State	9th	2003
III	Illinois	8th	2007
III	Michigan State	7th	2008
III	Marquette	1st	Never
IV	Texas A&M	11th	2007
IV	Texas	10th	2007
IV	Texas State	2nd	2000
IV	Missouri	1st	Never
V	Colorado	15th	2008
V	Colorado State	13th	2008
V	Colorado Mines	1st	Never
V	Denver	1st	Never
VI	UC-Santa Barbara	9th	2008
VI	Arizona	5th	2008
VI	UCLA	3rd	2007
VI	Cal Poly	1st	Never

=== Men's open ===
Participating teams
Region	Num	Team
I	3	UConn, Towson, Villanova
II	3	Virginia Tech, JMU, East Carolina
III	0	–
IV	3	Texas, Wichita State, Kansas
V	2	Colorado, Iowa State
VI	5	Arizona, UC-Irvine, UCLA, San Diego State, Southern Cal

=== Women's open ===
Participating teams
Region	Num	Team
I	4	Villanova, Towson, Boston College, Vermont
II	4	MTSU, Vanderbilt, JMU, Miami (FL)
III	1	UW-Milwaukee
IV	0	–
V	4	Air Force, Colorado, Iowa State, Colorado State
VI	3	San Diego State, Oregon, UC-Berkeley

== Group stage ==
=== Men's championship ===
Group A
Pos	Team	Pld	W	D	L	GF	GA	GD	Pts	Qualification
1	Virginia	2	2	0	0	6	1	+5	6	Advanced to knockout stage
2	Penn State	2	1	0	1	3	2	+1	3	Advanced to knockout stage
3	Arizona State	2	0	0	2	0	6	−6	0	Consolation

Scores

8:00am MST	Penn State	2–0	Arizona State	Field 11
Thu, November 19		Report		Stadium: Reach 11 Sports Complex; Phoenix, Arizona

1:15pm MST	Arizona State	0–4	Virginia	Field 11
Thu, November 19		Report		Stadium: Reach 11 Sports Complex; Phoenix, Arizona

6:30pm MST	Virginia	2–1	Penn State	Field 11
Thu, November 19		Report		Stadium: Reach 11 Sports Complex; Phoenix, Arizona

Group B
Pos	Team	Pld	W	D	L	GF	GA	GD	Pts	Qualification
1	Colorado State	2	2	0	0	4	0	+4	6	Advanced to knockout stage
2	Georgia	2	0	1	1	1	2	−1	1	Advanced to knockout stage
3	Johns Hopkins	2	0	1	1	1	4	−3	1	Consolation

Scores

8:00am MST	Georgia	1–1	Johns Hopkins	Field 12
Thu, November 19		Report		Stadium: Reach 11 Sports Complex; Phoenix, Arizona

1:15pm MST	Johns Hopkins	0–3	Colorado State	Field 12
Thu, November 19		Report		Stadium: Reach 11 Sports Complex; Phoenix, Arizona

6:30pm MST	Colorado State	1–0	Georgia	Field 12
Thu, November 19		Report		Stadium: Reach 11 Sports Complex; Phoenix, Arizona

Group C
Pos	Team	Pld	W	D	L	GF	GA	GD	Pts	Qualification
1	Weber State	2	1	1	0	2	1	+1	4	Advanced to knockout stage
2	Michigan State	2	0	2	0	0	0	0	2	Advanced to knockout stage
3	Texas State	2	0	1	1	1	2	−1	1	Consolation

Scores

8:00am MST	Weber State	2–1	Texas State	Field 13
Thu, November 19		Report		Stadium: Reach 11 Sports Complex; Phoenix, Arizona

1:15pm MST	Texas State	0–0	Michigan State	Field 13
Thu, November 19		Report		Stadium: Reach 11 Sports Complex; Phoenix, Arizona

6:30pm MST	Michigan State	0–0	Weber State	Field 13
Thu, November 19		Report		Stadium: Reach 11 Sports Complex; Phoenix, Arizona

Group D
Pos	Team	Pld	W	D	L	GF	GA	GD	Pts	Qualification
1	Ohio State	2	1	1	0	2	1	+1	4	Advanced to knockout stage
2	North Carolina	2	1	0	1	2	2	0	3	Advanced to knockout stage
3	UC–Berkeley	2	0	1	1	0	1	−1	1	Consolation

Scores

8:00am MST	Ohio State	2–1	North Carolina	Field 14
Thu, November 19		Report		Stadium: Reach 11 Sports Complex; Phoenix, Arizona

1:15pm MST	North Carolina	1–0	UC Berkeley	Field 14
Thu, November 19		Report		Stadium: Reach 11 Sports Complex; Phoenix, Arizona

6:30pm MST	UC Berkeley	0–0	Ohio State	Field 14
Thu, November 19		Report		Stadium: Reach 11 Sports Complex; Phoenix, Arizona

Group E
Pos	Team	Pld	W	D	L	GF	GA	GD	Pts	Qualification
1	Michigan	2	1	1	0	2	0	+2	4	Advanced to knockout stage
2	Florida	2	1	0	1	4	2	+2	3	Advanced to knockout stage
3	Delaware	2	0	1	1	0	4	−4	1	Consolation

Scores

9:45am MST	Florida	0–2	Michigan	Field 11
Thu, November 19		Report		Stadium: Reach 11 Sports Complex; Phoenix, Arizona

3:00pm MST	Michigan	0–0	Delaware	Field 11
Thu, November 19		Report		Stadium: Reach 11 Sports Complex; Phoenix, Arizona

8:15pm MST	Delaware	0–4	Florida	Field 11
Thu, November 19		Report		Stadium: Reach 11 Sports Complex; Phoenix, Arizona

Group F
Pos	Team	Pld	W	D	L	GF	GA	GD	Pts	Qualification
1	Missouri	2	2	0	0	4	0	+4	6	Advanced to knockout stage
2	Colorado	2	1	0	1	2	3	−1	3	Advanced to knockout stage
3	UW – Milwaukee	2	0	0	2	1	4	−3	0	Consolation

Scores

9:45am MST	UW-Milwaukee	1–2	Colorado	Field 12
Thu, November 19		Report		Stadium: Reach 11 Sports Complex; Phoenix, Arizona

3:00pm MST	Colorado	0–2	Missouri	Field 12
Thu, November 19		Report		Stadium: Reach 11 Sports Complex; Phoenix, Arizona

8:15pm MST	Missouri	2–0	UW-Milwaukee	Field 12
Thu, November 19		Report		Stadium: Reach 11 Sports Complex; Phoenix, Arizona

Group G
Pos	Team	Pld	W	D	L	GF	GA	GD	Pts	Qualification
1	UC-Santa Barbara	2	2	0	0	5	0	+5	6	Advanced to knockout stage
2	Texas A&M	2	1	0	1	2	2	0	3	Advanced to knockout stage
3	Navy	2	0	0	2	1	6	−5	0	Consolation

Scores

9:45am MST	Texas A&M	0–1	UCSB	Field 13
Thu, November 19		Report		Stadium: Reach 11 Sports Complex; Phoenix, Arizona

3:00pm MST	UCSB	4–0	Navy	Field 13
Thu, November 19		Report		Stadium: Reach 11 Sports Complex; Phoenix, Arizona

8:15pm MST	Navy	1–2	Texas A&M	Field 13
Thu, November 19		Report		Stadium: Reach 11 Sports Complex; Phoenix, Arizona

Group H
Pos	Team	Pld	W	D	L	GF	GA	GD	Pts	Qualification
1	Minnesota	2	2	0	0	3	0	+3	6	Advanced to knockout stage
2	Cal Poly	2	1	0	1	1	1	0	3	Advanced to knockout stage
3	Illinois	2	0	0	2	0	3	−3	0	Consolation

Scores

9:45am MST	Minnesota	2–0	Illinois	Field 14
Thu, November 19		Report		Stadium: Reach 11 Sports Complex; Phoenix, Arizona

3:00pm MST	Illinois	0–1	Cal Poly	Field 14
Thu, November 19		Report		Stadium: Reach 11 Sports Complex; Phoenix, Arizona

8:15pm MST	Cal Poly	0–1	Minnesota	Field 14
Thu, November 19		Report		Stadium: Reach 11 Sports Complex; Phoenix, Arizona

=== Women's championship ===
Group A
Pos	Team	Pld	W	D	L	GF	GA	GD	Pts	Qualification
1	Cal Poly	2	2	0	0	2	3	−1	6	Advanced to knockout stage
2	Michigan State	2	1	0	1	6	2	+4	3	Advanced to knockout stage
3	Florida	2	0	0	2	1	4	−3	0	Consolation

Scores

8:00am MST	Michigan State	3–1	Florida	Field 15
Thu, November 19		Report		Stadium: Reach 11 Sports Complex; Phoenix, Arizona

1:15pm MST	Florida	0–1	Cal Poly	Field 15
Thu, November 19		Report		Stadium: Reach 11 Sports Complex; Phoenix, Arizona

6:30pm MST	Cal Poly	1–3	Michigan State	Field 15
Thu, November 19		Report		Stadium: Reach 11 Sports Complex; Phoenix, Arizona

Group B
Pos	Team	Pld	W	D	L	GF	GA	GD	Pts	Qualification
1	UCLA	2	2	0	0	5	1	+4	6	Advanced to knockout stage
2	Illinois	2	1	0	1	4	2	+2	3	Advanced to knockout stage
3	Colorado Mines	2	0	0	2	2	8	−6	0	Consolation

Scores

8:00am MST	Illinois	0–1	UCLA	Field 16
Thu, November 19		Report		Stadium: Reach 11 Sports Complex; Phoenix, Arizona

1:15pm MST	UCLA	4–1	Colorado Mines	Field 16
Thu, November 19		Report		Stadium: Reach 11 Sports Complex; Phoenix, Arizona

6:30pm MST	Colorado Mines	1–4	Illinois	Field 16
Thu, November 19		Report		Stadium: Reach 11 Sports Complex; Phoenix, Arizona

Group C
Pos	Team	Pld	W	D	L	GF	GA	GD	Pts	Qualification
1	Penn State	2	2	0	0	3	0	+3	6	Advanced to knockout stage
2	Marquette	2	1	0	1	3	1	+2	3	Advanced to knockout stage
3	Missouri	2	0	0	2	0	5	−5	0	Consolation

Scores

8:00am MST	Penn State	2–0	Missouri	Field 17
Thu, November 19		Report		Stadium: Reach 11 Sports Complex; Phoenix, Arizona

1:15pm MST	Missouri	0–3	Marquette	Field 17
Thu, November 19		Report		Stadium: Reach 11 Sports Complex; Phoenix, Arizona

6:30pm MST	Marquette	0–1	Penn State	Field 17
Thu, November 19		Report		Stadium: Reach 11 Sports Complex; Phoenix, Arizona

Group D
Pos	Team	Pld	W	D	L	GF	GA	GD	Pts	Qualification
1	Colorado	2	2	0	0	6	1	+5	6	Advanced to knockout stage
2	UC-Santa Barbara	2	1	0	1	3	5	−2	3	Advanced to knockout stage
3	Delaware	2	0	0	2	2	5	−3	0	Consolation

Scores

8:00am MST	Colorado	2–1	Delaware	Field 18
Thu, November 19		Report		Stadium: Reach 11 Sports Complex; Phoenix, Arizona

1:15pm MST	Delaware	1–3	UCSB	Field 18
Thu, November 19		Report		Stadium: Reach 11 Sports Complex; Phoenix, Arizona

6:30pm MST	UCSB	0–4	Colorado	Field 18
Thu, November 19		Report		Stadium: Reach 11 Sports Complex; Phoenix, Arizona

Group E
Pos	Team	Pld	W	D	L	GF	GA	GD	Pts	Qualification
1	Texas	2	2	0	0	4	2	+2	6	Advanced to knockout stage
2	Virginia Tech	2	0	1	1	2	3	−1	1	Advanced to knockout stage
3	Cornell	2	0	1	1	2	3	−1	1	Consolation

Scores

9:45am MST	Virginia Tech	1–1	Cornell	Field 15
Thu, November 19		Report		Stadium: Reach 11 Sports Complex; Phoenix, Arizona

3:00pm MST	Cornell	1–2	Texas	Field 15
Thu, November 19		Report		Stadium: Reach 11 Sports Complex; Phoenix, Arizona

8:15pm MST	Texas	2–1	Virginia Tech	Field 15
Thu, November 19		Report		Stadium: Reach 11 Sports Complex; Phoenix, Arizona

9:45am MST	Virginia Tech	4–2; Kicks from the mark	Cornell	Field 6
Fri, November 20		Report		Stadium: Reach 11 Sports Complex; Phoenix, Arizona

Group F
Pos	Team	Pld	W	D	L	GF	GA	GD	Pts	Qualification
1	Arizona	2	1	1	0	3	0	+3	4	Advanced to knockout stage
2	Ohio State	2	1	1	0	2	0	+2	4	Advanced to knockout stage
3	Denver	2	0	0	2	0	5	−5	0	Consolation

Scores

9:45am MST	Arizona	0–0	Ohio State	Field 16
Thu, November 19		Report		Stadium: Reach 11 Sports Complex; Phoenix, Arizona

3:00pm MST	Ohio State	2–0	Denver	Field 16
Thu, November 19		Report		Stadium: Reach 11 Sports Complex; Phoenix, Arizona

8:15pm MST	Denver	0–3	Arizona	Field 16
Thu, November 19		Report		Stadium: Reach 11 Sports Complex; Phoenix, Arizona

Group G
Pos	Team	Pld	W	D	L	GF	GA	GD	Pts	Qualification
1	Virginia	2	2	0	0	5	2	+3	6	Advanced to knockout stage
2	Texas A&M	2	1	0	1	4	8	−4	3	Advanced to knockout stage
3	The College of New Jersey	2	0	0	2	4	3	+1	0	Consolation

Scores

9:45am MST	Texas A&M	2–4	Virginia	Field 17
Thu, November 19		Report		Stadium: Reach 11 Sports Complex; Phoenix, Arizona

3:00pm MST	Virginia	1–0	TCNJ	Field 17
Thu, November 19		Report		Stadium: Reach 11 Sports Complex; Phoenix, Arizona

8:15pm MST	TCNJ	4–2	Texas A&M	Field 17
Thu, November 19		Report		Stadium: Reach 11 Sports Complex; Phoenix, Arizona

Group H
Pos	Team	Pld	W	D	L	GF	GA	GD	Pts	Qualification
1	Michigan	2	2	0	0	4	0	+4	6	Advanced to knockout stage
2	Texas State	2	1	0	1	3	3	0	3	Advanced to knockout stage
3	Colorado State	2	0	0	2	1	5	−4	0	Consolation

Scores

9:45am MST	Colorado State	1–3	Texas State	Field 18
Thu, November 19		Report		Stadium: Reach 11 Sports Complex; Phoenix, Arizona

3:00pm MST	Texas State	0–2	Michigan	Field 18
Thu, November 19		Report		Stadium: Reach 11 Sports Complex; Phoenix, Arizona

8:15pm MST	Michigan	2–0	Colorado State	Field 18
Thu, November 19		Report		Stadium: Reach 11 Sports Complex; Phoenix, Arizona

=== Men's open ===
Group A
Pos	Team	Pld	W	D	L	GF	GA	GD	Pts	Qualification
1	Arizona	3	3	0	0	5	0	+5	9	Advanced to knockout stage
2	UConn	3	2	0	1	4	4	0	6	Advanced to knockout stage
3	Virginia Tech	3	1	0	2	2	3	−1	3	
4	UC – Irvine	3	0	0	3	1	5	−4	0	

Scores

8:00am MST	Arizona	2–0	UConn	Field 5
Thu, November 19		Report		Stadium: Reach 11 Sports Complex; Phoenix, Arizona

8:00am MST	Virginia Tech	1–0	UC Irvine	Field 6
Thu, November 19		Report		Stadium: Reach 11 Sports Complex; Phoenix, Arizona

1:15pm MST	UC Irvine	0–2	Arizona	Field 5
Thu, November 19		Report		Stadium: Reach 11 Sports Complex; Phoenix, Arizona

1:15pm MST	UConn	2–1	Virginia Tech	Field 6
Thu, November 19		Report		Stadium: Reach 11 Sports Complex; Phoenix, Arizona

8:00am MST	Arizona	1–0	Virginia Tech	Field 5
Fri, November 20		Report		Stadium: Reach 11 Sports Complex; Phoenix, Arizona

8:00am MST	UC Irvine	1–2	UConn	Field 6
Fri, November 20		Report		Stadium: Reach 11 Sports Complex; Phoenix, Arizona

Group B
Pos	Team	Pld	W	D	L	GF	GA	GD	Pts	Qualification
1	JMU	3	3	0	0	13	1	+11	9	Advanced to knockout stage
2	UCLA	3	2	0	1	3	2	+1	6	Advanced to knockout stage
3	Wichita State	3	1	0	2	5	7	−2	3	
4	Iowa State	3	0	0	3	2	13	−10	0	

Scores

8:00am MST	UCLA	1–0	Iowa State	Field 8
Thu, November 19		Report		Stadium: Reach 11 Sports Complex; Phoenix, Arizona

8:00am MST	JMU	4–0	Wichita State	Field 9
Thu, November 19		Report		Stadium: Reach 11 Sports Complex; Phoenix, Arizona

1:15pm MST	Wichita State	0–2	UCLA	Field 8
Thu, November 19		Report		Stadium: Reach 11 Sports Complex; Phoenix, Arizona

1:15pm MST	Iowa State	1–7	JMU	Field 9
Thu, November 19		Report		Stadium: Reach 11 Sports Complex; Phoenix, Arizona

8:00am MST	UCLA	0–2	JMU	Field 8
Fri, November 20		Report		Stadium: Reach 11 Sports Complex; Phoenix, Arizona

8:00am MST	Wichita State	5–1	Iowa State	Field 9
Fri, November 20		Report		Stadium: Reach 11 Sports Complex; Phoenix, Arizona

Group C
Pos	Team	Pld	W	D	L	GF	GA	GD	Pts	Qualification
1	San Diego State	3	2	1	0	7	2	+5	7	Advanced to knockout stage
2	Colorado “Black”	3	2	0	1	4	3	+1	6	Advanced to knockout stage
3	Texas	3	1	1	1	4	4	0	4	
4	Towson	3	0	1	2	1	7	−6	1	

Scores

9:45am MST	Texas	3–1	Towson	Field 5
Thu, November 19		Report		Stadium: Reach 11 Sports Complex; Phoenix, Arizona

9:45am MST	San Diego State	3–1	Colorado	Field 6
Thu, November 19		Report		Stadium: Reach 11 Sports Complex; Phoenix, Arizona

3:00pm MST	Colorado	2–0	Texas	Field 5
Thu, November 19		Report		Stadium: Reach 11 Sports Complex; Phoenix, Arizona

3:00pm MST	Towson	0–3	San Diego State	Field 6
Thu, November 19		Report		Stadium: Reach 11 Sports Complex; Phoenix, Arizona

10:00am MST	Texas	1–1	San Diego State	Field 5
Fri, November 20		Report		Stadium: Reach 11 Sports Complex; Phoenix, Arizona

10:00am MST	Colorado	1–0	Towson	Field 6
Fri, November 20		Report		Stadium: Reach 11 Sports Complex; Phoenix, Arizona

Group D
Pos	Team	Pld	W	D	L	GF	GA	GD	Pts	Qualification
1	Villanova	3	2	1	0	4	1	+3	7	Advanced to knockout stage
2	East Carolina	3	1	2	0	3	2	+1	5	Advanced to knockout stage
3	USC	3	0	1	2	4	5	−1	1	
4	Kansas	3	0	1	2	3	6	−3	1	

Scores

9:45am MST	USC	1–1	East Carolina	Field 8
Thu, November 19		Report		Stadium: Reach 11 Sports Complex; Phoenix, Arizona

9:45am MST	Kansas	0–2	Villanova	Field 9
Thu, November 19		Report		Stadium: Reach 11 Sports Complex; Phoenix, Arizona

3:00pm MST	Villanova	1–0	USC	Field 8
Thu, November 19		Report		Stadium: Reach 11 Sports Complex; Phoenix, Arizona

3:00pm MST	East Carolina	1–0	Kansas	Field 9
Thu, November 19		Report		Stadium: Reach 11 Sports Complex; Phoenix, Arizona

10:00am MST	USC	3–3	Kansas	Field 8
Fri, November 20		Report		Stadium: Reach 11 Sports Complex; Phoenix, Arizona

10:00am MST	Villanova	1–1	East Carolina	Field 9
Fri, November 20		Report		Stadium: Reach 11 Sports Complex; Phoenix, Arizona

=== Women's open ===
Group A
Pos	Team	Pld	W	D	L	GF	GA	GD	Pts	Qualification
1	San Diego State	3	3	0	0	10	0	+9	9	Advanced to knockout stage
2	Villanova	3	2	0	1	8	3	+4	6	Advanced to knockout stage
3	MTSU	3	1	0	2	3	5	−2	3	
4	Air Force	3	0	0	3	3	16	−11	0	

Scores

11:30am MST	San Diego State	6–0	Air Force	Field 5
Thu, November 19		Report		Stadium: Reach 11 Sports Complex; Phoenix, Arizona

11:30am MST	MTSU	0–1	Villanova	Field 6
Thu, November 19		Report		Stadium: Reach 11 Sports Complex; Phoenix, Arizona

4:45pm MST	Villanova	0–2	San Diego State	Field 5
Thu, November 19		Report		Stadium: Reach 11 Sports Complex; Phoenix, Arizona

4:45pm MST	Air Force	2–3	MTSU	Field 6
Thu, November 19		Report		Stadium: Reach 11 Sports Complex; Phoenix, Arizona

8:00am MST	San Diego State	2–0	MTSU	Field 5
Fri, November 20		Report		Stadium: Reach 11 Sports Complex; Phoenix, Arizona

8:00am MST	Villanova	7–1	Air Force	Field 6
Fri, November 20		Report		Stadium: Reach 11 Sports Complex; Phoenix, Arizona

Group B
Pos	Team	Pld	W	D	L	GF	GA	GD	Pts	Qualification
1	Colorado “Black”	3	2	1	0	13	0	+10	7	Advanced to knockout stage
2	Oregon	3	2	1	0	7	0	+7	7	Advanced to knockout stage
3	Towson	3	1	0	2	3	10	−5	3	
4	Vanderbilt	3	0	0	3	1	14	−12	0	

Scores

11:30am MST	Colorado	6–0	Vanderbilt	Field 8
Thu, November 19		Report		Stadium: Reach 11 Sports Complex; Phoenix, Arizona

11:30am MST	Oregon	2–0	Towson	Field 9
Thu, November 19		Report		Stadium: Reach 11 Sports Complex; Phoenix, Arizona

4:45pm MST	Towson	0–7	Colorado	Field 8
Thu, November 19		Report		Stadium: Reach 11 Sports Complex; Phoenix, Arizona

4:45pm MST	Vanderbilt	0–5	Oregon	Field 9
Thu, November 19		Report		Stadium: Reach 11 Sports Complex; Phoenix, Arizona

8:00am MST	Colorado	0–0	Oregon	Field 8
Fri, November 20		Report		Stadium: Reach 11 Sports Complex; Phoenix, Arizona

8:00am MST	Towson	3–1	Vanderbilt	Field 9
Fri, November 20		Report		Stadium: Reach 11 Sports Complex; Phoenix, Arizona

Group C
Pos	Team	Pld	W	D	L	GF	GA	GD	Pts	Qualification
1	JMU	3	3	0	0	16	1	+11	9	Advanced to knockout stage
2	Boston College	3	2	0	1	9	2	+7	6	Advanced to knockout stage
3	Miami	3	1	0	2	2	10	−7	3	
4	Iowa State	3	0	0	3	0	14	−11	0	

Scores

11:30am MST	JMU	6–0	Miami	Field 5
Thu, November 19		Report		Stadium: Reach 11 Sports Complex; Phoenix, Arizona

11:30am MST	Boston College	4–0	Iowa State	Field 6
Thu, November 19		Report		Stadium: Reach 11 Sports Complex; Phoenix, Arizona

4:45pm MST	Iowa State	0–8	JMU	Field 5
Thu, November 19		Report		Stadium: Reach 11 Sports Complex; Phoenix, Arizona

4:45pm MST	Miami	0–4	Boston College	Field 6
Thu, November 19		Report		Stadium: Reach 11 Sports Complex; Phoenix, Arizona

8:00am MST	JMU	2–1	Boston College	Field 5
Fri, November 20		Report		Stadium: Reach 11 Sports Complex; Phoenix, Arizona

8:00am MST	Iowa State	0–2	Miami	Field 6
Fri, November 20		Report		Stadium: Reach 11 Sports Complex; Phoenix, Arizona

Group D
Pos	Team	Pld	W	D	L	GF	GA	GD	Pts	Qualification
1	UC–Berkeley	3	2	1	0	8	0	+8	7	Advanced to knockout stage
2	UW – Milwaukee	3	2	1	0	4	1	+3	7	Advanced to knockout stage
3	Vermont	3	1	0	2	2	6	−4	3	
4	Colorado State “Green”	3	0	0	3	2	9	−7	0	

Scores

11:30am MST	UC Berkeley	4–0	Vermont	Field 8
Thu, November 19		Report		Stadium: Reach 11 Sports Complex; Phoenix, Arizona

11:30am MST	Colorado State	1–3	UW-Milwaukee	Field 9
Thu, November 19		Report		Stadium: Reach 11 Sports Complex; Phoenix, Arizona

4:45pm MST	UW-Milwaukee	0–0	UC Berkeley	Field 8
Thu, November 19		Report		Stadium: Reach 11 Sports Complex; Phoenix, Arizona

4:45pm MST	Vermont	2–1	Colorado State	Field 9
Thu, November 19		Report		Stadium: Reach 11 Sports Complex; Phoenix, Arizona

8:00am MST	UC Berkeley	4–0	Colorado State	Field 8
Fri, November 20		Report		Stadium: Reach 11 Sports Complex; Phoenix, Arizona

8:00am MST	UW-Milwaukee	1–0	Vermont	Field 9
Fri, November 20		Report		Stadium: Reach 11 Sports Complex; Phoenix, Arizona

== Tournament bracket ==
=== Men's championship ===
Sweet 16
Fri • 10:00am • Field 11
Virginia	1
North Carolina	0
Fri • 10:00am • Field 12
Minnesota	0
Florida	3
Fri • 10:00am • Field 13
UC Santa Barbara	0
Colorado	1
Fri • 10:00am • Field 14
Colorado State	0
Michigan State	1
Fri • 12:00pm • Field 11
Weber State	2
Georgia	1
Fri • 12:00pm • Field 12
Missouri	1
Texas A&M	3
Fri • 12:00pm • Field 13
Michigan	2
Cal Poly	1
Fri • 12:00pm • Field 14
Ohio State	0
Penn State	1

Quarterfinals
Fri • 4:00pm • Field 13
Virginia	0
Florida	2
Fri • 4:00pm • Field 14
Colorado (pen.)	1 (5)
Michigan State	1 (3)
Fri • 6:00pm • Field 13
Weber State (pen.)	2 (6)
Texas A&M	2 (5)
Fri • 6:00pm • Field 14
Michigan	2
Penn State	0

Semifinals
Sat • 10:00am • Field 13
Florida	3
Colorado	0
Sat • 10:00am • Field 14
Weber State	2
Michigan	1

Final
Sat • 5:00pm • Field 2
Florida	0 (2)
Weber State (pen.)	0 (3)

==== Men's consolation ====
Quarterfinals
Fri • 2:00pm • Field 5
Arizona State	2
Delaware	1
Fri • 2:00pm • Field 6
UW-Milwaukee	3
Johns Hopkins	2
Fri • 2:00pm • Field 17
Texas State	0
Navy	2
Fri • 2:00pm • Field 18
Illinois	1
UC-Berkeley	0

Semifinals
Sat • 8:00am • Field 15
Arizona State	0
UW-Milwaukee	5
Sat • 8:00am • Field 16
Navy	1
Illinois	0

Final
Sat • 1:00pm • Field 17
UW-Milwaukee	3
Navy	2

=== Women's championship ===
Sweet 16
Fri • 10:00am • Field 15
Cal Poly	0
UC-Santa Barbara	2
Fri • 10:00am • Field 16
Michigan	5
Virginia Tech	1
Fri • 10:00am • Field 17
Virginia	1
Ohio State (pen.)	1
Fri • 10:00am • Field 18
UCLA	2
Marquette	1
Fri • 12:00pm • Field 15
Penn State	1
Illinois	0
Fri • 12:00pm • Field 16
Arizona	4
Texas A&M	0
Fri • 12:00pm • Field 17
Texas	1
Texas State	2
Fri • 12:00pm • Field 18
Colorado	0
Michigan State	1

Quarterfinals
Fri • 4:00pm • Field 17
UC-Santa Barbara	4
Michigan	0
Fri • 4:00pm • Field 18
Ohio State	0
UCLA	1
Fri • 6:00pm • Field 17
Penn State	2
Arizona	1
Fri • 6:00pm • Field 18
Texas State	2
Michigan State	1

Semifinals
Sat • 10:00am • Field 15
UC-Santa Barbara	1
UCLA	0
Sat • 10:00am • Field 16
Penn State	2
Texas State	0

Final
Sat • 3:00pm • Field 2
UC-Santa Barbara	2
Penn State	0

==== Women's consolation ====
Quarterfinals
Fri • 4:00pm • Field 5
Florida	3
Cornell	2
Fri • 4:00pm • Field 6
Denver	2
Colorado Mines (pen.)	2
Fri • 4:00pm • Field 11
Missouri	1
TCNJ	0
Fri • 4:00pm • Field 12
Colorado State	1
Delaware	2

Semifinals
Sat • 8:00am • Field 17
Florida	3
Colorado Mines	2
Sat • 8:00am • Field 18
Missouri	1
Delaware	0

Final
Sat • 1:00pm • Field 18
Florida	1
Missouri	2

=== Men's open ===
Quarterfinals
Fri • 2:00pm • Field 15
Arizona	0
UCLA	1
Fri • 2:00pm • Field 16
JMU (a.e.t.)	2
UConn	1
Fri • 4:00pm • Field 15
Villanova	1
Colorado	0
Fri • 4:00pm • Field 16
San Diego State	3
East Carolina	0

Semifinals
Sat • 8:00am • Field 13
UCLA	2
JMU	6
Sat • 8:00am • Field 14
Villanova	1
San Diego State	2

Final
Sat • 1:00pm • Field 15
JMU (pen.)	1 (6)
San Diego State	1 (5)

=== Women's open ===
Quarterfinals
Fri • 2:00pm • Field 11
San Diego State	0
Oregon	2
Fri • 2:00pm • Field 12
Colorado "Black"	3
Villanova	0
Fri • 2:00pm • Field 13
UC-Berkeley	1
Boston College (pen.)	1
Fri • 2:00pm • Field 14
JMU	4
UW-Milwaukee	0

Semifinals
Sat • 8:00am • Field 11
Oregon (pen.)	1 (5)
Colorado "Black"	1 (3)
Sat • 8:00am • Field 12
Boston College	0
JMU	3

Final
Sat • 1:00pm • Field 16
Oregon	0
JMU	2
