= 2017 NIRSA National Soccer Championship =

- League: NIRSA
- Sport: Soccer
- Site: Reach 11 Sports Complex; Phoenix, Arizona
- Duration: November 16–18, 2017
- Teams: 24
- Results: Official Results

Men's Championship Division
- Score: 4–1
- Champion: BYU (6th title, 7th title game)
- Runners-up: Cal Poly (1st title game)
- Season MVP: Tanner Whitworth (BYU)

Women's Championship Division
- Score: 3–0
- Champion: UC-Santa Barbara (8th title, 10th title game)
- Runners-up: Texas (2nd title game)
- Season MVP: Mariela Cisneros (UC-Santa Barbara)

Men's Open Division
- Score: 1–0
- Champion: Arizona (1st title, 1st title game)
- Runners-up: Texas (4th title game)
- Season MVP: Karai Keil (Arizona)

Women's Open Division
- Score: 2–1
- Champion: Oregon (1st title, 3rd title game)
- Runners-up: Colorado "Black" (4th title game)
- Top seed: Amy Shepard (Oregon)

NIRSA national soccer championships seasons
- ← 2016 2018 →

The 2017 NIRSA national soccer championship was the 24th NIRSA National Soccer Championships, the annual national championships for United States-based, collegiate club soccer teams organized by NIRSA. It took place at Reach 11 Sports Complex, in Phoenix, Arizona from Thursday, November 16 to Saturday, November 18, 2017.

== Overview ==
=== Men's championship ===
In the finals, the most successful club in the division, BYU, made their NIRSA return after a 15-year hiatus after participating in USL League Two where they would face finals debutants Cal Poly. Prior to this, in the group stage, BYU would defeat 2012 champions Michigan State 3–1 in the opener then UPenn 5–0 to top their group while Cal Poly would tie region II tournament champions NC State 0–0 but a 7–1 win over UConn would be enough to top the group over NC State who beat UConn 6–1.

In the knockout round, BYU would defeat 2015 champions North Carolina 2–0 in the round of 16 then would defeat NC State 1–0 in the quarterfinals, to face Wisconsin, who defeated reigning champions Virginia in the round of 16, in the semifinals. Meanwhile, Cal Poly would defeat 2010 champions Colorado 3–0 in the round of 16 then defeat Michigan State 2–1 in the quarterfinals to face 2009 runners-up Florida. BYU would defeat 3–1 to advance to their 7th national title game while Cal Poly would defeat Florida 1–0 to advance to their first national title game.

In the finals, BYU started early with a goal in the 19th minute, then continued to control the game by scoring three more uncontested goals, including a brace from eventual MVP Tanner Whitworth, in a 4–1 victory and would claim their 6th national title in their first year back in the league. This is the most in the men's division and the second most across all 4 divisions, only behind UC-Santa Barbara who would claim their 8th national title this tournament.

=== Women's championship ===
In the finals, the division's most successful club, UC-Santa Barbara, would make their 10th national championship game to face Texas in a rematch of the 2010 national title that UC-Santa Barbara won in penalties. Prior to this, in the group stage, UC-Santa Barbara would tie 1–1 to region II tournament finalist, Florida but a 3–0 win over Ohio would be enough to top their group. Meanwhile, Texas would defeat both teams in their group 2–1, first UC-Davis then Vermont.

In the knockout round, UC-Santa Barbara would defeat Vermont 1–0 in the round of 16 then would defeat Cal Poly 1–0 in the quarterfinals to face 2001 champions Penn State while Texas would defeat Florida 1–0 in the round of 16 then Wisconsin 2–1 in the quarterfinals to face 2004 co-champion Colorado. UC-Santa Barbara would defeat Penn State 4–0 while Texas would defeat Colorado 1–0 to set up a rematch of the 2010 national title.

In the finals, eventual MVP Mariela Cisneros of UC-Santa Barbara opened the scoring 20 minutes into the game in an eventual 3–0 win. This was UC-Santa Barbara's 8th, and second consecutive, title; the most titles across all four divisions.

=== Men's open ===
In the finals, debutants Arizona faced 1995 men's championship winner, Texas, making their 4th finals appearance and the first open finals appearance as the main team. A first half goal would be enough to see Arizona win 1–0 for their first men's open title in their first title game. Karai Keil of Arizona would be named men's open MVP.

=== Women's open ===
In the finals, Colorado's "Black" team would face Oregon. Oregon took an early lead but Colorado tied the game in the second half. A late goal from Meghan Schroeder of Oregon would see Oregon win their first ever title in their 3rd finals appearance.

== Format ==
The competition consisted of 96 teams: 48 men's teams and 48 women's teams. Each of these divisions were further divided into two 24-team divisions: the championship and open. The championship division divided teams into eight groups of three while the open division divided teams into six groups of four, both engaging in a round-robin tournament that determined teams able to advance to a knockout stage. Pool play games were two 40-minute halves, separated by a seven-minute halftime and utilized the three points for a win system. In the championship division, the two highest ranked teams from each group advanced to their knockout stage, with the third placed team advancing to a consolation bracket. In the open division, the top team from each group as well as the two best second placed teams advanced to their knockout stage.

Tie-breaking criteria for group play
The ranking of teams in each group was based on the following criteria in order:
1. Highest number of points
2. Winner of head-to-head competition
3. Greatest goal difference
  - Maximum ± 5 goal difference per match
4. Most goals scored
5. Most shutouts

In a tie breaking scenario involving more than 2 teams, the tiebreaker procedure would begin. If one team is identified as different and both remaining teams are still tied, the tie breaker procedure is restarted.

If a tie still remained after the first 5 criteria, the following was used to break a tie:

1. NCAA kicks from the mark
  - If there was a three-way tie, a coin-flip would be conducted. The two teams that chose the same outcome would compete in kicks from the mark between each other. The winner would compete with the last remaining team in kicks from the mark
  - If there's a four-way tie, a drawing of lots would be conducted (only could occur in open division)

Knockout stage games also consisted of two 40-minute halves. The round of 16 and quarterfinals were separated by a seven-minute halftime while the semifinals and finals had a ten-minute halftime. Knockout stage games needed to declare a winner. If a knockout-stage game was tied at the end of regulation, overtime would begin. Overtime consisted of one, 15-minute, golden-goal period. If still tied after overtime, kicks from the mark would determine the winner.

== Qualification and selection ==
Each of the six regions received three automatic bids for both the men's and women's championship that they award to its members. The final six bids are considered "at-large", and are given out by NIRSA to teams, typically based on the regional tournament results and RPI.

The 48 remaining teams participating in the open division were selected via a lottery draw that aired on YouTube on October 3, 2017, at 1 p.m. PST. Any team with membership in a NIRSA-affiliated league or with a minimum of four games played prior to the tournament were able to enter their name into the lottery. If a selected team qualified for the championship division, an alternate would take their spot. 62 men's teams and 67 women's were selected.

=== Men's championship ===
Participants
Region	Team	Appearance	Last Bid
I	UConn	4th	2016
I	Penn	6th	2010
I	Boston College	2nd	2007
II	North Carolina	13th	2016
II	Florida	11th	2016
II	Virginia	9th	2016
II	Virginia Tech	9th	2015
II	NC State	1st	Never
III	Michigan	14th	2016
III	Ohio State	12th	2016
III	Michigan State	10th	2016
III	Wisconsin	3rd	2016
III	Illinois	14th	2015
IV	Texas A&M	18th	2016
IV	Kansas	6th	2004
IV	SIUE	1st	Never
V	Colorado	16th	2016
V	Minnesota	14th	2016
V	Colorado Mines	7th	2016
VI	UC-Santa Barbara	10th	2013
VI	Cal Poly	8th	2015
VI	BYU	8th	2002
VI	Stanford	2nd	2016
VI	UC San Diego	1st	Never

=== Women's championship ===
Participants
Region	Team	Appearance	Last Bid
I	Penn State	22nd	2016
I	Delaware	15th	2016
I	Northeastern	1st	Never
I	Ithaca	1st	Never
I	Vermont	1st	Never
II	Florida	15th	2016
II	Virginia Tech	15th	2015
II	North Carolina	14th	2016
II	Georgia	3rd	2012
III	Ohio State	17th	2016
III	Michigan	17th	2015
III	Wisconsin	2nd	2016
III	Ohio	2nd	1995
IV	Texas	18th	2016
IV	Texas A&M	18th	2016
IV	WashU	3rd	2015
IV	SMU	1st	Never
V	Colorado	23rd	2016
V	Colorado State	21st	2016
V	Colorado Mines	6th	2016
VI	UC-Santa Barbara	17th	2016
VI	Cal Poly	7th	2016
VI	Gonzaga	2nd	2016
VI	UC-Davis	3rd	2014

=== Men's open ===
Full men's lottery selections
Region	Team	Selection Type	Bid result
I	UConn	Automatic	Accepted
I	SUNY Geneseo	Automatic	Not accepted
I	Villanova	Automatic	Accepted
I	Yale	Automatic	Not accepted
I	Columbia	Waitlist	Not accepted
I	Cornell	Waitlist	Accepted from waitlist
I	Fordham	Waitlist	Accepted from waitlist
I	Saint Joseph's	Waitlist	Not given
I	Brown	Waitlist	Not given
I	SUNY Cortland	Waitlist	Not given
I	Penn	Waitlist	Championship
I	George Mason	Waitlist	Not given
I	Maryland	Waitlist	Not given
I	Georgetown	Waitlist	Not given
I	Ithaca	Waitlist	Not given
I	Vermont	Waitlist	Not given
I	SUNY Brockport	Waitlist	Not given
I	Amherst	Waitlist	Not given
I	Northeastern	Waitlist	Not given
I	Towson	Waitlist	Not given
I	Penn State	Waitlist	Not given
I	Hofstra	Waitlist	Not given
I	Rhode Island	Waitlist	Not given
I	UMass	Waitlist	Not given
I	Albany	Waitlist	Not given
I	Stony Brook	Waitlist	Not given
I	UMBC	Waitlist	Not given
I	New Haven	Waitlist	Not given
II	Miami (FL)	Automatic	Accepted
II	NKU	Automatic	Not accepted
II	Virginia Tech	Automatic	Championship
II	UNC-Greensville	Automatic	Accepted
II	Miami (OH)	Waitlist	Accepted from waitlist
II	JMU	Waitlist	Accepted from waitlist
III	Ohio	Automatic	Accepted
III	Xavier	Automatic	Accepted
III	Illinois	Automatic	Accepted
III	Minnesota	Automatic	Accepted
III	UW-Milwaukee	Waitlist	Not given
III	Cincinnati	Waitlist	Not given
III	Marquette	Waitlist	Not given
III	Purdue	Waitlist	Not given
IV	McNeese State	Automatic	Not accepted
IV	Houston CC	Automatic	Accepted
IV	Louisiana	Automatic	Not accepted
IV	Texas	Automatic	Accepted
IV	St. Edward's	Waitlist	Accepted from waitlist
IV	LSU	Waitlist	Not accepted
IV	Grand Canyon	Waitlist	Not accepted
IV	Texas A&M Corpus Christi	Waitlist	Not accepted
IV	Incarnate Word	Waitlist	Not accepted
IV	Missouri	Waitlist	Accepted from waitlist
IV	Kansas State	Waitlist	Not given
IV	Kansas	Waitlist	Championship
IV	Saint Louis	Waitlist	Not given
IV	Arkansas	Waitlist	Not given
IV	Trinity	Waitlist	Not given
IV	WashU	Waitlist	Not given
V	Colorado Mines	Automatic	Accepted
V	Colorado Springs	Automatic	Accepted
V	Colorado	Automatic	Accepted
V	Denver	Automatic	Accepted
V	Iowa State	Waitlist	Not accepted
V	Northern Iowa	Waitlist	Not accepted
VI	San Diego State	Automatic	Accepted
VI	Arizona	Automatic	Accepted
VI	Cal State Fullerton	Automatic	Accepted
VI	UCLA	Automatic	Accepted
VI	Utah Valley	Waitlist	Not given
VI	Cal Poly	Waitlist	Championship
VI	Oregon	Waitlist	Not given
VI	UC-Santa Barbara	Waitlist	Championship
VI	Cal State Long Beach	Waitlist	Not given
VI	Cal State Sacramento	Waitlist	Not given
VI	Utah State	Waitlist	Not given
VI	UC-Berkeley	Waitlist	Not given
VI	UC-Davis	Waitlist	Not given

Participating men's lottery teams
Region	Team	Selection Type	Bid result
I	UConn	Automatic	Accepted
I	Villanova	Automatic	Accepted
I	Cornell	Waitlist	Accepted from waitlist
I	Fordham	Waitlist	Accepted from waitlist
II	Miami (FL)	Automatic	Accepted
II	UNC-Greensville	Automatic	Accepted
II	Miami (OH)	Waitlist	Accepted from waitlist
II	JMU	Waitlist	Accepted from waitlist
III	Ohio	Automatic	Accepted
III	Xavier	Automatic	Accepted
III	Illinois	Automatic	Accepted
III	Minnesota	Automatic	Accepted
IV	Houston CC	Automatic	Accepted
IV	Texas	Automatic	Accepted
IV	St. Edward's	Waitlist	Accepted from waitlist
IV	Missouri	Waitlist	Accepted from waitlist
V	Colorado Mines	Automatic	Accepted
V	Colorado Springs	Automatic	Accepted
V	Colorado	Automatic	Accepted
V	Denver	Automatic	Accepted
VI	San Diego State	Automatic	Accepted
VI	Arizona	Automatic	Accepted
VI	Cal State Fullerton	Automatic	Accepted
VI	UCLA	Automatic	Accepted

=== Women's open ===
Full women's lottery selections
Region	Team	Selection Type	Bid result
I	Villanova	Automatic	Accepted
I	Northeastern	Automatic	Championship
I	Delaware	Automatic	Championship
I	Towson	Automatic	Accepted
I	SUNY Cortland	Waitlist	Not accepted
I	The College of New Jersey	Waitlist	Accepted from waitlist
I	UConn	Waitlist	Accepted from waitlist
I	Boston College	Waitlist	Not given
I	Fordham	Waitlist	Not given
I	Montclair State	Waitlist	Not given
I	Cornell	Waitlist	Not given
I	Penn State	Waitlist	Championship
I	Stony Brook	Waitlist	Not given
I	UMass	Waitlist	Not given
I	Pitt	Waitlist	Not given
I	Syracuse	Waitlist	Not given
I	Vermont	Waitlist	Championship
I	Penn	Waitlist	Not given
I	Loyola (MD)	Waitlist	Not given
I	George Mason	Waitlist	Not given
I	Georgetown	Waitlist	Not given
I	West Virginia	Waitlist	Not given
I	George Washington	Waitlist	Not given
II	Miami (FL)	Automatic	Accepted
II	UCF	Automatic	Accepted
II	Georgia Tech	Automatic	Not accepted
II	Vanderbilt	Automatic	Accepted
II	Virginia Tech	Waitlist	Championship
II	High Point	Waitlist	Not accepted
II	JMU	Waitlist	Accepted from waitlist
III	Grand Valley State	Automatic	Accepted
III	Notre Dame	Automatic	Accepted
III	Illinois	Automatic	Accepted
III	Dayton	Automatic	Accepted
III	Indiana	Waitlist	Not given
III	Ohio	Waitlist	Championship
III	Iowa	Waitlist	Not given
III	Marquette	Waitlist	Not given
III	UW-Milwaukee	Waitlist	Not given
IV	Missouri	Automatic	Accepted
IV	Rice	Automatic	Accepted
IV	Saint Louis	Automatic	Not accepted
IV	Texas	Automatic	Championship
IV	Texas Tech	Waitlist	Not accepted
IV	Wash U	Waitlist	Championship
IV	Missouri State	Waitlist	Accepted from waitlist
IV	Stephen F. Austin	Waitlist	Not accepted
IV	St. Edwards	Waitlist	Not accepted
IV	Tulane	Waitlist	Not accepted
IV	Kansas	Waitlist	Accepted from waitlist
V	Air Force	Automatic	Accepted
V	Denver	Automatic	Not accepted
V	Colorado Mines	Automatic	Championship
V	Iowa State	Automatic	Accepted
V	Northern Iowa	Waitlist	Not accepted
V	Minnesota	Waitlist	Accepted from waitlist
V	Colorado	Waitlist	Accepted from waitlist
V	Colorado Springs	Waitlist	Not given
VI	Oregon	Automatic	Accepted
VI	UCLA	Automatic	Accepted
VI	UC-Berkeley	Automatic	Not accepted
VI	Washington State	Automatic	Not accepted
VI	Cal State Northridge	Waitlist	Not accepted
VI	Washington	Waitlist	Not accepted
VI	Grand Canyon	Waitlist	Accepted from waitlist
VI	San Diego State	Waitlist	Accepted from waitlist
VI	Arizona	Waitlist	Not given
VI	UC-Santa Barbara	Waitlist	Championship
VI	Utah	Waitlist	Not given
VI	Northern Arizona	Waitlist	Not given

Participating women's lottery teams
Region	Team	Selection Type	Bid result
I	Villanova	Automatic	Accepted
I	Towson	Automatic	Accepted
I	The College of New Jersey	Waitlist	Accepted from waitlist
I	UConn	Waitlist	Accepted from waitlist
II	Miami (FL)	Automatic	Accepted
II	UCF	Automatic	Accepted
II	Vanderbilt	Automatic	Accepted
II	JMU	Waitlist	Accepted from waitlist
III	Grand Valley State	Automatic	Accepted
III	Notre Dame	Automatic	Accepted
III	Illinois	Automatic	Accepted
III	Dayton	Automatic	Accepted
IV	Missouri	Automatic	Accepted
IV	Rice	Automatic	Accepted
IV	Missouri State	Waitlist	Accepted from waitlist
IV	Kansas	Waitlist	Accepted from waitlist
V	Air Force	Automatic	Accepted
V	Iowa State	Automatic	Accepted
V	Minnesota	Waitlist	Accepted from waitlist
V	Colorado	Waitlist	Accepted from waitlist
VI	Oregon	Automatic	Accepted
VI	UCLA	Automatic	Accepted
VI	Grand Canyon	Waitlist	Accepted from waitlist
VI	San Diego State	Waitlist	Accepted from waitlist

== Group stage ==
=== Men's championship ===
Group A
Pos	Team	Pld	W	D	L	GF	GA	GD	Pts	Qualification
1	Texas A&M	2	2	0	0	4	1	+3	6	Advanced to knockout stage
2	Colorado	2	1	0	1	6	3	+3	3	Advanced to knockout stage
3	Virginia Tech	2	0	0	2	1	7	−6	0	Consolation

Scores

8:00 a.m. MST	Texas A&M	2–0	Virginia Tech	Field 11
Thu, November 16		Report		Stadium: Reach 11 Sports Complex; Phoenix, Arizona

1:15 p.m. MST	Virginia Tech	1–5	Colorado	Field 13
Thu, November 16		Report		Stadium: Reach 11 Sports Complex; Phoenix, Arizona

6:30 p.m. MST	Colorado	1–2	Texas A&M	Field 12
Thu, November 16		Report		Stadium: Reach 11 Sports Complex; Phoenix, Arizona

Group B
Pos	Team	Pld	W	D	L	GF	GA	GD	Pts	Qualification
1	Virginia	2	1	1	0	2	0	+2	4	Advanced to knockout stage
2	Minnesota	2	0	2	0	2	2	0	2	Advanced to knockout stage
3	UC San Diego	2	0	1	1	2	4	−2	1	Consolation

Scores

8:00 a.m. MST	Virginia	2–0	UC San Diego	Field 12
Thu, November 16		Report		Stadium: Reach 11 Sports Complex; Phoenix, Arizona

1:15 p.m. MST	UC San Diego	2–2	Minnesota	Field 14
Thu, November 16		Report		Stadium: Reach 11 Sports Complex; Phoenix, Arizona

6:30 p.m. MST	Minnesota	0–0	Virginia	Field 11
Thu, November 16		Report		Stadium: Reach 11 Sports Complex; Phoenix, Arizona

Group C
Pos	Team	Pld	W	D	L	GF	GA	GD	Pts	Qualification
1	Stanford	2	2	0	0	6	0	+6	6	Advanced to knockout stage
2	Wisconsin	2	1	0	1	2	1	+1	3	Advanced to knockout stage
3	Kansas	2	0	0	2	0	7	−7	0	Consolation

Scores

8:00 a.m. MST	Wisconsin	0–1	Stanford	Field 13
Thu, November 16		Report		Stadium: Reach 11 Sports Complex; Phoenix, Arizona

1:15 p.m. MST	Stanford	5–0	Kansas	Field 11
Thu, November 16		Report		Stadium: Reach 11 Sports Complex; Phoenix, Arizona

6:30 p.m. MST	Kansas	0–2	Wisconsin	Field 14
Thu, November 16		Report		Stadium: Reach 11 Sports Complex; Phoenix, Arizona

Group D
Pos	Team	Pld	W	D	L	GF	GA	GD	Pts	Qualification
1	Cal Poly	2	1	1	0	7	1	+5 (Note: Actual GD differs because the max GD for any one game is ±5, which came into effect when Cal Poly beat UConn 7–1)	4	Advanced to knockout stage
2	NC State	2	1	1	0	6	1	+5	4	Advanced to knockout stage
3	UConn	2	0	0	2	2	13	−10	0	Consolation

Scores

8:00 a.m. MST	NC State	0–0	Cal Poly	Field 14
Thu, November 16		Report		Stadium: Reach 11 Sports Complex; Phoenix, Arizona

1:15 p.m. MST	Cal Poly	7–1	UConn	Field 12
Thu, November 16		Report		Stadium: Reach 11 Sports Complex; Phoenix, Arizona

6:30 p.m. MST	UConn	1–6	NC State	Field 13
Thu, November 16		Report		Stadium: Reach 11 Sports Complex; Phoenix, Arizona

Notes:

Group E
Pos	Team	Pld	W	D	L	GF	GA	GD	Pts	Qualification
1	Ohio State	2	1	1	0	4	1	+3	4	Advanced to knockout stage
2	North Carolina	2	1	1	0	3	1	+2	4	Advanced to knockout stage
3	Colorado Mines	2	0	0	2	0	5	−5	0	Consolation

Scores

9:45 a.m. MST	Colorado Mines	0–2	North Carolina	Field 11
Thu, November 16		Report		Stadium: Reach 11 Sports Complex; Phoenix, Arizona

3:00 p.m. MST	North Carolina	1–1	Ohio State	Field 13
Thu, November 16		Report		Stadium: Reach 11 Sports Complex; Phoenix, Arizona

8:15 p.m. MST	Ohio State	3–0	Colorado Mines	Field 12
Thu, November 16		Report		Stadium: Reach 11 Sports Complex; Phoenix, Arizona

Group F
Pos	Team	Pld	W	D	L	GF	GA	GD	Pts	Qualification
1	Florida	2	1	1	0	4	2	+2	4	Advanced to knockout stage
2	Michigan	2	1	0	1	4	3	+1	3	Advanced to knockout stage
3	Boston College	2	0	1	1	1	4	−3	1	Consolation

Scores

9:45 a.m. MST	Boston College	0–3	Michigan	Field 12
Thu, November 16		Report		Stadium: Reach 11 Sports Complex; Phoenix, Arizona

3:00 p.m. MST	Michigan	1–3	Florida	Field 14
Thu, November 16		Report		Stadium: Reach 11 Sports Complex; Phoenix, Arizona

8:15 p.m. MST	Florida	1–1	Boston College	Field 11
Thu, November 16		Report		Stadium: Reach 11 Sports Complex; Phoenix, Arizona

Group G
Pos	Team	Pld	W	D	L	GF	GA	GD	Pts	Qualification
1	UC-Santa Barbara	2	2	0	0	8	1	+7	6	Advanced to knockout stage
2	Illinois	2	1	0	1	2	3	−1	3	Advanced to knockout stage
3	SIUE	2	0	0	2	1	7	−6	0	Consolation

Scores

9:45 a.m. MST	Illinois	2–0	SIUE	Field 13
Thu, November 16		Report		Stadium: Reach 11 Sports Complex; Phoenix, Arizona

3:00 p.m. MST	SIUE	1–5	UC-Santa Barbara	Field 11
Thu, November 16		Report		Stadium: Reach 11 Sports Complex; Phoenix, Arizona

8:15 p.m. MST	UC-Santa Barbara	3–0	Illinois	Field 14
Thu, November 16		Report		Stadium: Reach 11 Sports Complex; Phoenix, Arizona

Group H
Pos	Team	Pld	W	D	L	GF	GA	GD	Pts	Qualification
1	BYU	2	2	0	0	8	1	+7	6	Advanced to knockout stage
2	Michigan State	2	0	1	1	2	4	−2	1	Advanced to knockout stage
3	Penn	2	0	1	1	1	6	−5	1	Consolation

Scores

9:45 a.m. MST	BYU	3–1	Michigan State	Field 14
Thu, November 16		Report		Stadium: Reach 11 Sports Complex; Phoenix, Arizona

3:00 p.m. MST	Michigan State	1–1	Penn	Field 12
Thu, November 16		Report		Stadium: Reach 11 Sports Complex; Phoenix, Arizona

8:15 p.m. MST	Penn	0–5	BYU	Field 13
Thu, November 16		Report		Stadium: Reach 11 Sports Complex; Phoenix, Arizona

=== Women's championship ===
Group A
Pos	Team	Pld	W	D	L	GF	GA	GD	Pts	Qualification
1	Texas	2	2	0	0	4	2	+2	6	Advanced to knockout stage
2	Vermont	2	1	0	1	3	2	+1	3	Advanced to knockout stage
3	UC Davis	2	0	0	2	1	4	−3	0	Consolation

Scores

8:00 a.m. MST	Texas	2–1	UC Davis	Field 15
Thu, November 16		Report		Stadium: Reach 11 Sports Complex; Phoenix, Arizona

1:15 p.m. MST	UC Davis	0–2	Vermont	Field 17
Thu, November 16		Report		Stadium: Reach 11 Sports Complex; Phoenix, Arizona

6:30 p.m. MST	Vermont	1–2	Texas	Field 16
Thu, November 16		Report		Stadium: Reach 11 Sports Complex; Phoenix, Arizona

Group B
Pos	Team	Pld	W	D	L	GF	GA	GD	Pts	Qualification
1	North Carolina	2	2	0	0	6	2	+4	6	Advanced to knockout stage
2	Penn State	2	1	0	1	5	4	+1	3	Advanced to knockout stage
3	SMU	2	0	0	2	2	7	−5	0	Consolation

Scores

8:00 a.m. MST	North Carolina	3–1	Penn State	Field 16
Thu, November 16		Report		Stadium: Reach 11 Sports Complex; Phoenix, Arizona

1:15 p.m. MST	Penn State	4–1	SMU	Field 18
Thu, November 16		Report		Stadium: Reach 11 Sports Complex; Phoenix, Arizona

6:30 p.m. MST	SMU	1–3	North Carolina	Field 15
Thu, November 16		Report		Stadium: Reach 11 Sports Complex; Phoenix, Arizona

Group C
Pos	Team	Pld	W	D	L	GF	GA	GD	Pts	Qualification
1	Gonzaga	2	1	1	0	4	1	+3	4	Advanced to knockout stage
2	Ohio State	2	1	0	1	5	3	+2	3	Advanced to knockout stage
3	Ithaca	2	0	1	1	1	6	−5	1	Consolation

Scores

8:00 a.m. MST	Ohio State	0–3	Gonzaga	Field 17
Thu, November 16		Report		Stadium: Reach 11 Sports Complex; Phoenix, Arizona

1:15 p.m. MST	Gonzaga	1–1	Ithaca	Field 15
Thu, November 16		Report		Stadium: Reach 11 Sports Complex; Phoenix, Arizona

6:30 p.m. MST	Ithaca	0–5	Ohio State	Field 18
Thu, November 16		Report		Stadium: Reach 11 Sports Complex; Phoenix, Arizona

Group D
Pos	Team	Pld	W	D	L	GF	GA	GD	Pts	Qualification
1	UC-Santa Barbara	2	1	1	0	4	1	+3	4	Advanced to knockout stage
2	Florida	2	1	1	0	2	1	+1	4	Advanced to knockout stage
3	Ohio	2	0	0	2	0	4	−4	0	Consolation

Scores

8:00 a.m. MST	UC-Santa Barbara	1–1	Florida	Field 18
Thu, November 16		Report		Stadium: Reach 11 Sports Complex; Phoenix, Arizona

1:15 p.m. MST	Florida	1–0	Ohio	Field 16
Thu, November 16		Report		Stadium: Reach 11 Sports Complex; Phoenix, Arizona

6:30 p.m. MST	Ohio	0–3	UC-Santa Barbara	Field 17
Thu, November 16		Report		Stadium: Reach 11 Sports Complex; Phoenix, Arizona

Group E
Pos	Team	Pld	W	D	L	GF	GA	GD	Pts	Qualification
1	Northeastern	2	1	1	0	3	2	+1	4	Advanced to knockout stage
2	Virginia Tech	2	1	1	0	2	1	+1	4	Advanced to knockout stage
3	Texas A&M	2	0	0	2	3	5	−2	0	Consolation

Scores

9:45 a.m. MST	Virginia Tech	2–1	Texas A & M	Field 15
Thu, November 16		Report		Stadium: Reach 11 Sports Complex; Phoenix, Arizona

3:00 p.m. MST	Texas A & M	2–3	Northeastern	Field 17
Thu, November 16		Report		Stadium: Reach 11 Sports Complex; Phoenix, Arizona

8:15 p.m. MST	Northeastern	0–0	Virginia Tech	Field 16
Thu, November 16		Report		Stadium: Reach 11 Sports Complex; Phoenix, Arizona

Group F
Pos	Team	Pld	W	D	L	GF	GA	GD	Pts	Qualification
1	Colorado State	2	2	0	0	4	0	+4	6	Advanced to knockout stage
2	Delaware	2	1	0	1	3	2	+1	3	Advanced to knockout stage
3	Georgia	2	0	0	2	0	5	−5	0	Consolation

Scores

9:45 a.m. MST	Colorado State	2–0	Delaware	Field 16
Thu, November 16		Report		Stadium: Reach 11 Sports Complex; Phoenix, Arizona

3:00 p.m. MST	Delaware	3–0	Georgia	Field 18
Thu, November 16		Report		Stadium: Reach 11 Sports Complex; Phoenix, Arizona

8:15 p.m. MST	Georgia	0–2	Colorado State	Field 15
Thu, November 16		Report		Stadium: Reach 11 Sports Complex; Phoenix, Arizona

Group G
Pos	Team	Pld	W	D	L	GF	GA	GD	Pts	Qualification
1	Colorado	2	2	0	0	4	2	+2	6	Advanced to knockout stage
2	Michigan	2	1	0	1	3	3	0	3	Advanced to knockout stage
3	Wash U	2	0	0	2	0	2	−2	0	Consolation

Scores

9:45 a.m. MST	Colorado	3–2	Michigan	Field 17
Thu, November 16		Report		Stadium: Reach 11 Sports Complex; Phoenix, Arizona

3:00 p.m. MST	Michigan	1–0	Wash U	Field 15
Thu, November 16		Report		Stadium: Reach 11 Sports Complex; Phoenix, Arizona

8:15 p.m. MST	Wash U	0–1	Colorado	Field 18
Thu, November 16		Report		Stadium: Reach 11 Sports Complex; Phoenix, Arizona

Group H
Pos	Team	Pld	W	D	L	GF	GA	GD	Pts	Qualification
1	Wisconsin	2	2	0	0	4	1	+3	6	Advanced to knockout stage
2	Cal Poly	2	1	0	1	4	3	+1	3	Advanced to knockout stage
3	Colorado Mines	2	0	0	2	0	4	−4	0	Consolation

Scores

9:45 a.m. MST	Wisconsin	1–0	Colorado Mines	Field 18
Thu, November 16		Report		Stadium: Reach 11 Sports Complex; Phoenix, Arizona

3:00 p.m. MST	Colorado Mines	0–3	Cal Poly	Field 16
Thu, November 16		Report		Stadium: Reach 11 Sports Complex; Phoenix, Arizona

8:15 p.m. MST	Cal Poly	1–3	Wisconsin	Field 17
Thu, November 16		Report		Stadium: Reach 11 Sports Complex; Phoenix, Arizona

=== Men's open ===
Group A
Pos	Team	Pld	W	D	L	GF	GA	GD	Pts	Qualification
1	UCLA	3	2	1	0	6	4	+2	7	Advanced to knockout stage
2	UNC-Greensboro	3	1	2	0	3	2	+1	5	Advanced to knockout stage
3	Miami (OH)	3	1	1	1	5	4	+1	4	
4	Cornell	3	0	0	3	1	5	−4	0	

Scores

11:30 a.m. MST	UCLA	2–1	Cornell	Field 2
Thu, November 16		Report		Stadium: Reach 11 Sports Complex; Phoenix, Arizona

11:30 a.m. MST	UNCG	1–1	Miami (OH)	Field 3
Thu, November 16		Report		Stadium: Reach 11 Sports Complex; Phoenix, Arizona

6:30 p.m. MST	Miami (OH)	2–3	UCLA	Field 5
Thu, November 16		Report		Stadium: Reach 11 Sports Complex; Phoenix, Arizona

6:30 p.m. MST	Cornell	0–1	UNCG	Field 6
Thu, November 16		Report		Stadium: Reach 11 Sports Complex; Phoenix, Arizona

12:00 p.m. MST	UCLA	1–1	UNCG	Field 4
Fri, November 17		Report		Stadium: Reach 11 Sports Complex; Phoenix, Arizona

12:00 p.m. MST	Miami (OH)	2–0	Cornell	Field 7
Fri, November 17		Report		Stadium: Reach 11 Sports Complex; Phoenix, Arizona

Group B
Pos	Team	Pld	W	D	L	GF	GA	GD	Pts	Qualification
1	Texas	3	2	1	0	5	3	+2	7	Advanced to knockout stage
2	Ohio	3	1	1	1	4	4	0	4	
3	Fordham	3	1	0	2	2	3	−1	3	
4	Denver	3	0	2	1	3	4	−1	2	

Scores

11:30 a.m. MST	Ohio	1–0	Fordham	Field 5
Thu, November 16		Report		Stadium: Reach 11 Sports Complex; Phoenix, Arizona

11:30 a.m. MST	Denver	1–1	Texas	Field 6
Thu, November 16		Report		Stadium: Reach 11 Sports Complex; Phoenix, Arizona

6:30 p.m. MST	Texas	2–1	Ohio	Field 4
Thu, November 16		Report		Stadium: Reach 11 Sports Complex; Phoenix, Arizona

6:30 p.m. MST	Fordham	1–0	Denver	Field 7
Thu, November 16		Report		Stadium: Reach 11 Sports Complex; Phoenix, Arizona

12:00 p.m. MST	Ohio	2–2	Denver	Field 2
Fri, November 17		Report		Stadium: Reach 11 Sports Complex; Phoenix, Arizona

12:00 p.m. MST	Texas	2–1	Fordham	Field 3
Fri, November 17		Report		Stadium: Reach 11 Sports Complex; Phoenix, Arizona

Group C
Pos	Team	Pld	W	D	L	GF	GA	GD	Pts	Qualification
1	Illinois "Blue"	3	3	0	0	7	1	+6	9	Advanced to knockout stage
2	Minnesota "B"	3	1	1	1	3	3	0	4	
3	Cal State Fullerton	3	1	0	2	5	7	−2	3	
4	UConn "White"	3	0	1	2	4	8	−4	1	

Scores

11:30 a.m. MST	Illinois "Blue"	1–0	Minnesota "B"	Field 4
Thu, November 16		Report		Stadium: Reach 11 Sports Complex; Phoenix, Arizona

11:30 a.m. MST	Cal State Fullerton	4–2	UConn "White"	Field 7
Thu, November 16		Report		Stadium: Reach 11 Sports Complex; Phoenix, Arizona

6:30 p.m. MST	UConn "White"	1–3	Illinois "Blue"	Field 2
Thu, November 16		Report		Stadium: Reach 11 Sports Complex; Phoenix, Arizona

6:30 p.m. MST	Minnesota "B"	2–1	Cal State Fullerton	Field 3
Thu, November 16		Report		Stadium: Reach 11 Sports Complex; Phoenix, Arizona

12:00 p.m. MST	Illinois "Blue"	3–0	Cal State Fullerton	Field 5
Fri, November 17		Report		Stadium: Reach 11 Sports Complex; Phoenix, Arizona

12:00 p.m. MST	UConn "White"	1–1	Minnesota "B"	Field 6
Fri, November 17		Report		Stadium: Reach 11 Sports Complex; Phoenix, Arizona

Group D
Pos	Team	Pld	W	D	L	GF	GA	GD	Pts	Qualification
1	Xavier	3	1	2	0	5	2	+3	5	Advanced to knockout stage
2	Missouri	3	1	2	0	2	1	+1	5	
3	Villanova	3	1	1	1	3	2	+1	4	
4	Mines "B"	3	0	1	2	2	7	−5	1	

Scores

1:15 p.m. MST	Villanova	1–1	Xavier	Field 2
Thu, November 16		Report		Stadium: Reach 11 Sports Complex; Phoenix, Arizona

1:15 p.m. MST	Missouri	1–1	Mines "B"	Field 3
Thu, November 16		Report		Stadium: Reach 11 Sports Complex; Phoenix, Arizona

8:15 p.m. MST	Mines "B"	0–2	Villanova	Field 5
Thu, November 16		Report		Stadium: Reach 11 Sports Complex; Phoenix, Arizona

8:15 p.m. MST	Xavier	0–0	Missouri	Field 6
Thu, November 16		Report		Stadium: Reach 11 Sports Complex; Phoenix, Arizona

2:00 p.m. MST	Villanova	0–1	Missouri	Field 4
Fri, November 17		Report		Stadium: Reach 11 Sports Complex; Phoenix, Arizona

2:00 p.m. MST	Mines "B"	1–4	Xavier	Field 7
Fri, November 17		Report		Stadium: Reach 11 Sports Complex; Phoenix, Arizona

Group E
Pos	Team	Pld	W	D	L	GF	GA	GD	Pts	Qualification
1	San Diego State	3	3	0	0	7	0	+7	9	Advanced to knockout stage
2	JMU	3	1	1	1	3	3	0	4	
3	Colorado "Black"	3	0	2	1	1	2	−1	2	
4	Houston CC	3	0	1	2	1	7	−6	1	

Scores

1:15 p.m. MST	JMU	2–1	Houston CC	Field 5
Thu, November 16		Report		Stadium: Reach 11 Sports Complex; Phoenix, Arizona

1:15 p.m. MST	San Diego State	1–0	Colorado "Black"	Field 6
Thu, November 16		Report		Stadium: Reach 11 Sports Complex; Phoenix, Arizona

8:15 p.m. MST	Colorado "Black"	1–1	JMU	Field 4
Thu, November 16		Report		Stadium: Reach 11 Sports Complex; Phoenix, Arizona

8:15 p.m. MST	Houston CC	0–5	San Diego State	Field 7
Thu, November 16		Report		Stadium: Reach 11 Sports Complex; Phoenix, Arizona

2:00 p.m. MST	JMU	0–1	San Diego State	Field 2
Fri, November 17		Report		Stadium: Reach 11 Sports Complex; Phoenix, Arizona

2:00 p.m. MST	Colorado "Black"	0–0	Houston CC	Field 3
Fri, November 17		Report		Stadium: Reach 11 Sports Complex; Phoenix, Arizona

Group F
Pos	Team	Pld	W	D	L	GF	GA	GD	Pts	Qualification
1	Arizona	3	3	0	0	14	2	+11 (Note: Actual GD differs because the max GD for any one game is ±5, which came into effect when Arizona beat St. Edwards 6–0)	9	Advanced to knockout stage
2	Miami (FL)	3	2	0	1	6	5	+1	6	Advanced to knockout stage
3	Colorado Springs	3	1	0	2	3	5	−2	3	
4	St. Edward's	3	0	0	3	1	12	−10	0	

Scores

1:15 p.m. MST	Miami (FL)	3–1	St. Edward's	Field 4
Thu, November 16		Report		Stadium: Reach 11 Sports Complex; Phoenix, Arizona

1:15 p.m. MST	Arizona	4–0	Colorado Springs	Field 7
Thu, November 16		Report		Stadium: Reach 11 Sports Complex; Phoenix, Arizona

8:15 p.m. MST	Colorado Springs	0–1	Miami (FL)	Field 2
Thu, November 16		Report		Stadium: Reach 11 Sports Complex; Phoenix, Arizona

8:15 p.m. MST	St. Edward's	0–6	Arizona	Field 3
Thu, November 16		Report		Stadium: Reach 11 Sports Complex; Phoenix, Arizona

2:00 p.m. MST	Miami (FL)	2–4	Arizona	Field 5
Fri, November 17		Report		Stadium: Reach 11 Sports Complex; Phoenix, Arizona

2:00 p.m. MST	Colorado Springs	3–0	St. Edward's	Field 6
Fri, November 17		Report		Stadium: Reach 11 Sports Complex; Phoenix, Arizona

=== Women's open ===
Group A
Pos	Team	Pld	W	D	L	GF	GA	GD	Pts	Qualification
1	Colorado "Black"	3	3	0	0	11	1	+10	9	Advanced to knockout stage
2	The College of New Jersey	3	1	1	1	8	4	+4	4	
3	Vanderbilt	3	1	1	1	7	8	−1	4	
4	Missouri State	3	0	0	3	2	15	−13	0	

Scores

8:00 a.m. MST	Colorado "Black"	2–1	TCNJ	Field 2
Thu, November 16		Report		Stadium: Reach 11 Sports Complex; Phoenix, Arizona

8:00 a.m. MST	Vanderbilt	5–2	Missouri State	Field 3
Thu, November 16		Report		Stadium: Reach 11 Sports Complex; Phoenix, Arizona

3:00 p.m. MST	Missouri State	0–5	Colorado "Black"	Field 5
Thu, November 16		Report		Stadium: Reach 11 Sports Complex; Phoenix, Arizona

3:00 p.m. MST	TCNJ	2–2	Vanderbilt	Field 6
Thu, November 16		Report		Stadium: Reach 11 Sports Complex; Phoenix, Arizona

8:00 a.m. MST	Colorado "Black"	4–0	Vanderbilt	Field 4
Fri, November 17		Report		Stadium: Reach 11 Sports Complex; Phoenix, Arizona

8:00 a.m. MST	Missouri State	0–5	TCNJ	Field 7
Fri, November 17		Report		Stadium: Reach 11 Sports Complex; Phoenix, Arizona

Group B
Pos	Team	Pld	W	D	L	GF	GA	GD	Pts	Qualification
1	San Diego State	3	2	1	0	5	1	+4	7	Advanced to knockout stage
2	Notre Dame	3	1	1	1	6	3	+3	4	
3	Towson	3	1	0	2	3	7	−4	3	
4	Missouri	3	1	0	2	1	4	−3	3	

Scores

8:00 a.m. MST	San Diego State	2–0	Towson	Field 5
Thu, November 16		Report		Stadium: Reach 11 Sports Complex; Phoenix, Arizona

8:00 a.m. MST	Notre Dame	0–1	Missouri	Field 6
Thu, November 16		Report		Stadium: Reach 11 Sports Complex; Phoenix, Arizona

3:00 p.m. MST	Missouri	0–2	San Diego State	Field 4
Thu, November 16		Report		Stadium: Reach 11 Sports Complex; Phoenix, Arizona

3:00 p.m. MST	Towson	1–5	Notre Dame	Field 7
Thu, November 16		Report		Stadium: Reach 11 Sports Complex; Phoenix, Arizona

8:00 a.m. MST	San Diego State	1–1	Notre Dame	Field 2
Fri, November 17		Report		Stadium: Reach 11 Sports Complex; Phoenix, Arizona

8:00 a.m. MST	Missouri	0–2	Towson	Field 3
Fri, November 17		Report		Stadium: Reach 11 Sports Complex; Phoenix, Arizona

Group C
Pos	Team	Pld	W	D	L	GF	GA	GD	Pts	Qualification
1	Illinois	3	3	0	0	10	0	+8 (Note: Actual GD differs because the max GD for any one game is ±5, which came into effect when Illinois beat Miami(FL) 7–0)	9	Advanced to knockout stage
2	Kansas	3	1	1	1	3	2	+1	4	
3	UCLA	3	1	1	1	3	2	+1	4	
4	Miami (FL)	3	0	0	3	1	13	−10	0	

Scores

8:00 a.m. MST	Miami (FL)	0–3	Kansas	Field 4
Thu, November 16		Report		Stadium: Reach 11 Sports Complex; Phoenix, Arizona

8:00 a.m. MST	UCLA	0–1	Illinois	Field 7
Thu, November 16		Report		Stadium: Reach 11 Sports Complex; Phoenix, Arizona

3:00 p.m. MST	Illinois	7–0	Miami (FL)	Field 2
Thu, November 16		Report		Stadium: Reach 11 Sports Complex; Phoenix, Arizona

3:00 p.m. MST	Kansas	0–0	UCLA	Field 3
Thu, November 16		Report		Stadium: Reach 11 Sports Complex; Phoenix, Arizona

8:00 a.m. MST	Miami (FL)	1–3	UCLA	Field 5
Fri, November 17		Report		Stadium: Reach 11 Sports Complex; Phoenix, Arizona

8:00 a.m. MST	Illinois	2–0	Kansas	Field 6
Fri, November 17		Report		Stadium: Reach 11 Sports Complex; Phoenix, Arizona

Notes:

Group D
Pos	Team	Pld	W	D	L	GF	GA	GD	Pts	Qualification
1	Oregon	3	2	1	0	5	3	+2	7	Advanced to knockout stage
2	Iowa State	3	1	1	1	5	5	0	4	
3	UConn	3	1	0	2	6	5	+1	3	
4	Dayton	3	1	0	2	5	8	−3	3	

Scores

9:45 a.m. MST	UConn	1–2	Iowa State	Field 2
Thu, November 16		Report		Stadium: Reach 11 Sports Complex; Phoenix, Arizona

9:45 a.m. MST	Oregon	2–1	Dayton	Field 3
Thu, November 16		Report		Stadium: Reach 11 Sports Complex; Phoenix, Arizona

4:45 p.m. MST	Dayton	1–4	UConn	Field 5
Thu, November 16		Report		Stadium: Reach 11 Sports Complex; Phoenix, Arizona

4:45 p.m. MST	Iowa State	1–1	Oregon	Field 6
Thu, November 16		Report		Stadium: Reach 11 Sports Complex; Phoenix, Arizona

10:00 a.m. MST	UConn	1–2	Oregon	Field 4
Fri, November 17		Report		Stadium: Reach 11 Sports Complex; Phoenix, Arizona

10:00 a.m. MST	Dayton	3–2	Iowa State	Field 7
Fri, November 17		Report		Stadium: Reach 11 Sports Complex; Phoenix, Arizona

Group E
Pos	Team	Pld	W	D	L	GF	GA	GD	Pts	Qualification
1	Grand Valley	3	2	1	0	4	2	+2	7	Advanced to knockout stage
2	Cal	3	1	2	0	8	2	+5 (Note: Actual GD differs because the max GD for any one game is ±5, which came into effect when Cal beat UCF 6–0)	5	Advanced to knockout stage
3	Air Force	3	1	1	1	2	2	0	4	
4	UCF	3	0	0	3	1	9	−7	0	

Scores

9:45 a.m. MST	Cal	1–1	Grand Valley	Field 5
Thu, November 16		Report		Stadium: Reach 11 Sports Complex; Phoenix, Arizona

9:45 a.m. MST	UCF	0–1	Air Force	Field 6
Thu, November 16		Report		Stadium: Reach 11 Sports Complex; Phoenix, Arizona

4:45 p.m. MST	Air Force	1–1	Cal	Field 4
Thu, November 16		Report		Stadium: Reach 11 Sports Complex; Phoenix, Arizona

4:45 p.m. MST	Grand Valley	2–1	UCF	Field 7
Thu, November 16		Report		Stadium: Reach 11 Sports Complex; Phoenix, Arizona

10:00 a.m. MST	Cal	6–0	UCF	Field 2
Fri, November 17		Report		Stadium: Reach 11 Sports Complex; Phoenix, Arizona

10:00 a.m. MST	Air Force	0–1	Grand Valley	Field 3
Fri, November 17		Report		Stadium: Reach 11 Sports Complex; Phoenix, Arizona

Notes:

Group F
Pos	Team	Pld	W	D	L	GF	GA	GD	Pts	Qualification
1	JMU	3	2	1	0	8	2	+6	7	Advanced to knockout stage
2	Minnesota	3	2	1	0	6	1	+5	7	Advanced to knockout stage
3	Rice	3	1	0	2	3	4	−1	3	
4	Villanova	3	0	0	3	0	10	−10	0	

Scores

9:45 a.m. MST	JMU	1–1	Minnesota	Field 4
Thu, November 16		Report		Stadium: Reach 11 Sports Complex; Phoenix, Arizona

9:45 a.m. MST	Villanova	0–2	Rice	Field 7
Thu, November 16		Report		Stadium: Reach 11 Sports Complex; Phoenix, Arizona

4:45 p.m. MST	Rice	1–3	JMU	Field 2
Thu, November 16		Report		Stadium: Reach 11 Sports Complex; Phoenix, Arizona

4:45 p.m. MST	Minnesota	4–0	Villanova	Field 3
Thu, November 16		Report		Stadium: Reach 11 Sports Complex; Phoenix, Arizona

10:00 a.m. MST	JMU	4–0	Villanova	Field 5
Fri, November 17		Report		Stadium: Reach 11 Sports Complex; Phoenix, Arizona

10:00 a.m. MST	Rice	0–1	Minnesota	Field 6
Fri, November 17		Report		Stadium: Reach 11 Sports Complex; Phoenix, Arizona

== Tournament bracket ==
=== Men's championship ===
Sweet 16
Fri • 10:00 a.m. • Field 11
Texas A&M	1
NC State	2
Fri • 10:00 a.m. • Field 12
BYU	2
North Carolina	0
Fri • 10:00 a.m. • Field 13
UC-Santa Barbara	0
Michigan	2
Fri • 10:00 a.m. • Field 14
Virginia	1
Wisconsin	4
Fri • 12:00 p.m. • Field 11
Stanford	1
Minnesota	2
Fri • 12:00 p.m. • Field 12
Florida	3
Illinois	0
Fri • 12:00 p.m. • Field 13
Ohio State	0 (2)
Michigan State (pen.)	0 (4)
Fri • 12:00 p.m. • Field 14
Cal Poly	3
Colorado	0

Quarterfinals
Fri • 4:00 p.m. • Field 11
NC State	0
BYU	1
Fri • 4:00 p.m. • Field 12
Michigan	0
Wisconsin	1
Fri • 6:00 p.m. • Field 11
Minnesota	2
Florida	3
Fri • 6:00 p.m. • Field 12
Michigan State	1
Cal Poly	2

Semifinals
Sat • 10:00 a.m. • Field 15
BYU	3
Wisconsin	1
Sat • 10:00 a.m. • Field 16
Florida	0
Cal Poly	1

Final
Sat • 5:00 p.m. • Field 16
BYU	4
Cal Poly	1

==== Men's consolation ====
Quarterfinals
Fri • 4:00 p.m. • Field 2
Virginia Tech	3 (3)
Colorado Mines (pen.)	3 (4)
Fri • 4:00 p.m. • Field 3
Boston College	0
UC San Diego	2
Fri • 4:00 p.m. • Field 2
Kansas	0
SIUE	1
Fri • 4:00 p.m. • Field 3
Penn	0
UConn	1

Semifinals
Sat • 8:00 a.m. • Field 15
Colorado Mines	0
UC San Diego	1
Sat • 8:00 a.m. • Field 16
SIUE	1
UConn	0

Final
Sat • 1:00 p.m. • Field 11
UC San Diego	4
SIUE	2

=== Women's championship ===
Sweet 16
Fri • 10:00 a.m. • Field 15
Texas	1
Florida	0
Fri • 10:00 a.m. • Field 16
Wisconsin	1
Virginia Tech	0
Fri • 10:00 a.m. • Field 17
Colorado	2
Delaware	0
Fri • 10:00 a.m. • Field 18
North Carolina	1
Ohio State	2
Fri • 12:00 p.m. • Field 15
Gonzaga	0
Penn State	2
Fri • 12:00 p.m. • Field 16
Colorado State	0
Michigan (a.e.t.)	1
Fri • 12:00 p.m. • Field 17
Northeastern	1
Cal Poly (a.e.t.)	2
Fri • 12:00 p.m. • Field 18
UC-Santa Barbara	1
Vermont	0

Quarterfinals
Fri • 4:00 p.m. • Field 13
Texas	2
Wisconsin	1
Fri • 4:00 p.m. • Field 14
Colorado	1
Ohio State	0
Fri • 6:00 p.m. • Field 13
Penn State	2
Michigan	1
Fri • 6:00 p.m. • Field 14
Cal Poly	0
UC-Santa Barbara	1

Semifinals
Sat • 10:00 a.m. • Field 17
Texas	1
Colorado	0
Sat • 10:00 a.m. • Field 18
Penn State	0
UC-Santa Barbara	4

Final
Sat • 3:00 p.m. • Field 16
Texas	0
UC-Santa Barbara	3

==== Women's consolation ====
Quarterfinals
Fri • 4:00 p.m. • Field 5
UC Davis	0
Texas A&M	1
Fri • 4:00 p.m. • Field 6
Georgia	2
SMU	0
Fri • 6:00 p.m. • Field 5
Ithaca	0
Wash U	2
Fri • 6:00 p.m. • Field 6
Colorado Mines	1
Ohio	5

Semifinals
Sat • 8:00 a.m. • Field 17
Texas A&M	0
Georgia	2
Sat • 8:00 a.m. • Field 18
Wash U	1
Ohio	4

Final
Sat • 1:00 p.m. • Field 12
Georgia	1
Ohio	3

=== Men's open ===
Quarterfinals
Fri • 8:00 p.m. • Field 15
UCLA	0
Texas	1
Fri • 8:00 p.m. • Field 16
San Diego State	1
Miami (FL)	0
Fri • 8:00 p.m. • Field 17
Arizona	3
Xavier	1
Fri • 8:00 p.m. • Field 18
Illinois "Blue"	0
UNC-Greensboro	1

Semifinals
Sat • 9:00 a.m. • Field 11
Texas (pen.)	1 (3)
San Diego State	1 (1)
Sat • 9:00 a.m. • Field 12
Arizona	1
UNC-Greensboro	0

Final
Sat • 2:00 p.m. • Field 14
Texas	0
Arizona	1

=== Women's open ===
Quarterfinals
Fri • 4:00 p.m. • Field 15
Grand Valley	0
San Diego State	1
Fri • 4:00 p.m. • Field 16
Colorado "Black"	2
Minnesota	1
Fri • 4:00 p.m. • Field 17
JMU	0
Oregon	1
Fri • 4:00 p.m. • Field 18
Illinois	2
Cal	0

Semifinals
Sat • 8:00 a.m. • Field 13
San Diego State	0
Colorado "Black"	3
Sat • 8:00 a.m. • Field 14
Oregon	3
Illinois	0

Final
Sat • 1:00 p.m. • Field 13
Colorado "Black"	1
Oregon	2
