= 2018 NIRSA National Soccer Championship =

- League: NIRSA
- Sport: Soccer
- Site: Initial Tournament All divisions: Foley Tourism Sports Complex; Foley, Alabama Continuations Men's championship: UNC-Charlotte Rec Fields; Charlotte, NC; Women's championship: Natchez Trace Turf Field; Nashville, TN; Men's open: Cancelled; Women's open: UC-Irvine Rec Fields; Irvine, CA
- Duration: Initial Tournament All divisions: Nov. 29 – Dec. 1, 2018 Continuations Men's championship: January 26, 2019; Women's championship: February 23–24, 2019; Men's open: Cancelled; Women's open: February 23, 2019
- Teams: 24
- Results: Official Results

Men's Championship Division
- Score: 1–0 (a.e.t.)
- Champion: Florida (1st title, 2nd title game)
- Runners-up: North Carolina (2nd title game)
- Third place: Ohio State
- Fourth place: Virginia Tech
- Season MVP: Tyler Garrison (Florida)

Women's Championship Division
- Score: 2–0
- Champion: Ohio State (2nd title, 3rd title game)
- Runners-up: UC-Davis (1st title game)
- Season MVP: Amy King (Ohio State); Maria Mercedes Volmar (UC-Davis)

Men's Open Division
- Score: No game, named co-champions
- Champion: UCLA, Utah Valley (1st title both, 1st title game both)
- Season MVP: Chris Reyes (Utah Valley)

Women's Open Division
- Score: 3–1
- Champion: San Diego State (1st title, 1st title game)
- Runners-up: USC (1st title game)
- Top seed: Ellen Smolarski (San Diego State)

NIRSA national soccer championships seasons
- ← 2017 2019 →

The 2018 NIRSA national soccer championship was the 25th NIRSA National Soccer Championships, the annual national championships for United States-based, collegiate club soccer teams organized by NIRSA. It took place at Foley Tourism Complex, in Foley, Alabama from Thursday, November 29 to Saturday, December 1, 2018.

Weather cancelled the initial tournament prematurely, however a continuation was held for three of the four divisions, with the only division to not have a continuation, the men's open division, naming both finalists as champions.

== Overview ==
=== Prior to the cancellation ===
Both reigning champions in the men's and women's championship divisions were eliminated before the semifinals. In the men's championship division, the winningest team, BYU, would see their earliest ever exit from the tournament with an 2–1 loss in the quarterfinals to Florida while in the women's championship division, the reigning back-to-back champion, UC-Santa Barbara, were eliminated in the round of 16 by the 2015 national champions Michigan State following penalties. The women's championship division was also left with only one team that had previously claimed a title: Ohio State who won in 2014.

=== Continuation ===
Inclement weather cancelled all games Saturday after the 10:00am games, meaning the semi-final matches in the championship divisions and the finals of the open divisions were unable to be played. Attempting to avoid a repeat of the 2013 tournament where no champions were crowned, a unique continuation was put into place for each division based on the remaining teams.

==== Men's championship ====
The 4 remaining men's teams were North Carolina, Florida, Virginia Tech, and Ohio State. A continuation was held January 26, 2019 at the UNC-Charlotte Rec Fields in Charlotte, NC. Games consisted of 45 minute halves with a 10-minute halftime.

The first semifinal saw North Carolina face Region II tournament champion Virginia Tech in a rematch from the aforementioned 2018 Region II tournament's group stage that ended in a 1–1 draw. The only goals of the game were 2 North Carolina goals scored in the first half, seeing North Carolina in the finals for the second time in 4 years. The second semifinal saw Ohio State face Florida. A first half goal from eventual MVP Tyler Garrison of Florida was the only goal of the game and saw Florida advancing to the finals to face regional opponent North Carolina. Due to the unique circumstances of the tournament, the men's division decided to have a third place match, which had never occurred in the previous 24 iterations of the tournament in any division. Ohio State would beat Virginia Tech 3–1 to claim 3rd place.

After 90 minutes, the final between 2015 national champion North Carolina and regional foe Florida was tied 0–0, meaning a 15-minute sudden-goal overtime was to be conducted. Eventual MVP Tyler Garrison of Florida scored a free-kick in this overtime period to give Florida their first national title. This was Region II's third national title in four years despite not winning any of the previous 21 iterations.

==== Women's championship ====
The 4 remaining teams were UC-Davis, Illinois, Clemson, and Ohio State. The continuation was held February 23 & 24, 2019 at the Natchez Trace Turf Field at Vanderbilt University's Rec Fields in Nashville, TN. Initially, the tournament was supposed to be outside and end all in one day, but was again postponed due to rain. The semifinals were rescheduled to 8:30pm and 10:30pm indoors on Vanderbilt's Student Rec Center turf field with the finals being at 7:30am CST the following day, February 24, on the grass that they initially planned on using for all the games. Games were 40 minutes with a 10-minute halftime.

The first semifinal saw Ohio State face Clemson. Ohio State scored first in the 20th minute, a lead they held until the 51st minute when Clemson tied the game at 1–1. Ohio State countered with 3 goals in 7 minutes, beginning only 2 minutes after Clemson scored, and they would go on to win 4–1. The second semifinal saw UC-Davis face Illinois. UC-Davis scored 19 minutes into the game and held that lead until the final 6 minutes of regulation when Illinois tied the game at 1–1. The game would remain tied at the end of regulation and go to a 15-minute sudden-victory overtime. UC-Davis' Cayla Stillman scored to send UC-Davis to their first national championship finals. The game ended at 12:46am with the finals being at 7:30am.

The final between Ohio State and UC-Davis was scoreless at halftime, but 2 second half goals led to a 2–0 Ohio State victory, making them the only national champion to not win their first title this season.

==== Men's open ====
The 2 remaining teams prior to the cancellation were 2003 championship "finalists" Utah Valley State and UCLA. Prior to this, Utah Valley State would win their opener 2–0 over 2007 open runners-up Kansas but would drop their second to Minnesota 3–0. Facing potential elimination, Utah Valley State did all they could defeating High Point 14–3 but would still finish second in their group. Utah Valley State would tie with Cornell for the final wildcard spot on the points and goal difference tiebreaker, both with 6 and +4 respectively, but the 14 goals in the final were enough to claim the wildcard bid on the goals for tiebreaker. Meanwhile, UCLA would win all three group games, first 5–0 against Carnegie Mellon, then 4–0 over Xavier, and finally 2–0 over Iowa State.

In the knockout round, Utah Valley State would defeat Miami (FL) 4–0 in the quarterfinals then three time open champions JMU 2–1 in the semifinals while UCLA would defeat UConn 2–0 in the quarterfinals and Minnesota 1–0 in the semifinals, meaning they still were yet to concede after 5 games. However, the rain cancelled the tournament before the championship could be played, and even though the teams are in the same region, the 675 mile distance between universities was too much and they were unable to get a continuation scheduled and elected to share the title as joint champions making this only the second time joint champions were declared and the first time since 2004 with the four co-champions in the women's championship division. Notably, Utah Valley State's Chris Reyes would be named tournament MVP.

==== Women's open ====
The 2 remaining teams were 2006 champions San Diego State and finals debutants, University of Southern California (USC). In the group stage, San Diego State would win all three games 2–0, first against Georgia Tech, then against Maryland, and finally against Colorado School of the Mines. Meanwhile, USC would first defeat Kennesaw State 7–0, then would defeat Colorado Springs 3–0, but a 1–1 draw against Boston College would see them finish second in their group but would be enough to claim a wildcard spot.

In the knockout round, San Diego State would defeat Boston College 2–1 in the quarterfinals then JMU 2–0 in the semifinals while USC would defeat Oregon 2–1 then would defeat intra-city rivals UCLA 2–0 prior to the rain cancellation.

Fortunately, only 120 miles separated these schools, making the continuation fairly convenient. The continuation was held February 23, 2019 at UC-Irvine's Rec Fields in Irvine, CA. In the finals, San Diego State scored the first 3 goals, including one from eventual MVP Ellen Smolarski, in a 3–1 victory over USC for their first open national title.

== Format ==
The competition consisted of 96 teams: 48 men's teams and 48 women's teams. Each of these divisions were further divided into two 24-team divisions: the championship and open. The championship division divided teams into eight groups of three while the open division divided teams into six groups of four, both engaging in a round-robin tournament that determined teams able to advance to a knockout stage. Pool play games were two 40-minute halves, separated by a seven-minute halftime and utilized the three points for a win system. In the championship division, the two highest ranked teams from each group advanced to their knockout stage, with the third placed team advancing to a consolation bracket. In the open division, the top team from each group as well as the two best second placed teams advanced to their knockout stage.

Tie-breaking criteria for group play
The ranking of teams in each group was based on the following criteria in order:
1. Highest number of points
2. Winner of head-to-head competition
3. Greatest goal difference
  - Maximum ± 5 goal difference per match
4. Most goals scored
5. Most shutouts

In a tie breaking scenario involving more than 2 teams, the tiebreaker procedure would begin. If one team is identified as different and both remaining teams are still tied, the tie breaker procedure is restarted.

If a tie still remained after the first 5 criteria, the following was used to break a tie:

1. NCAA kicks from the mark
  - If there was a three-way tie, a coin-flip would be conducted. The two teams that chose the same outcome would compete in kicks from the mark between each other. The winner would compete with the last remaining team in kicks from the mark
  - If there's a four-way tie, a drawing of lots would be conducted (only could occur in open division)

Knockout stage games also consisted of two 40-minute halves. The round of 16 and quarterfinals were separated by a seven-minute halftime while the semifinals and finals had a ten-minute halftime. Knockout stage games needed to declare a winner. If a knockout-stage game was tied at the end of regulation, overtime would begin. Overtime consisted of one, 15-minute, golden-goal period. If still tied after overtime, kicks from the mark would determine the winner.

== Qualification and selections ==
Each of the six regions received three automatic bids for both the men's and women's championship that they award to its members. The final six bids are considered "at-large", and are given out by NIRSA to teams, typically based on the regional tournament results and RPI.

The 48 remaining teams participating in the open division were selected via a lottery draw that aired on YouTube on October 5, 2018, at 9am PST. Any team with membership in a NIRSA-affiliated league or with a minimum of four games played prior to the tournament were able to enter their name into the lottery. If a selected team qualified for the championship division, an alternate would take their spot. 62 men's teams and 67 women's were selected.

=== Men's championship ===
Automatic bid
Region	Method	Team	Appearance	Last Bid
I	Tournament; Co-champion	Delaware	12th	2016
I	Tournament; Co-champion	Navy	Did not attend	
I	Highest RPI of remaining teams	Pitt	1st	Never
II	Tournament; Champion	Virginia Tech	10th	2017
II	Highest RPI of remaining teams	North Carolina	14th	2017
II	2nd highest RPI of remaining teams	Florida	12th	2017
III	Tournament; Co-champion	Wisconsin	4th	2017
III	Tournament; Co-champion	Michigan	15th	2017
III	Highest RPI of remaining teams	Michigan State	11th	2017
IV	Bid-game 1 Winner	Texas Tech	8th	2010
IV	Bid-game 2 Winner	Texas	18th	2015
IV	Bid-game 3 Winner	Texas-Rio Grande	1st	Never
V	Tournament; Champion	Colorado	17th	2017
V	Tournament; Runner-up	Colorado State	20th	2016
V	3rd Place; Qualifier Winner	Minnesota	Elected for open division	
VI	North Tournament; Champion	Oregon	6th	2008
VI	South Tournament; Co-champion	USC	Did not attend	
VI	South Tournament; Co-champion	Cal Poly	9th	2017

At-large bids
Region	Team	Appearance	Last Bid
II	Virginia	10th	2017
III	Cincinnati	6th	2016
III	Illinois	15th	2017
III	Ohio State	13th	2017
VI	BYU	9th	2017
VI	Arizona	12th	2012
VI	San Jose State	1st	Never
VI	UC Davis	2nd	2013

=== Women's championship ===
Automatic bid
Region	Method	Team	Appearance	Last Bid
I	Tournament; Co-champion	Fordham	1st	Never
I	Tournament; Co-champion	Penn State	Elected for open division	
I	Highest RPI of remaining teams	UConn	2nd	2016
II	Tournament; Champion	North Carolina	15th	2017
II	Highest RPI of remaining teams	Clemson	5th	2013
II	2nd highest RPI of remaining teams	Virginia	10th	2016
III	Tournament; Champion	Illinois	13th	2016
III	Highest RPI of remaining teams	Michigan	18th	2017
III	2nd Highest RPI of remaining teams	Wisconsin	3rd	2017
IV	Bid-game 1 Winner	Wash U	4th	2017
IV	Bid-game 2 Winner	Texas	19th	2017
IV	Bid-game 3 Winner	Kansas	8th	2016
V	Tournament; Champion	Colorado	24th	2017
V	Tournament; Runner-up	Colorado State	22nd	2017
V	3rd Place; Qualifier Winner	Iowa State	1st	Never
VI	North Tournament; Champion	Gonzaga	3rd	2017
VI	South Tournament; Co-champion	Cal Poly	Did not attend	
VI	South Tournament; Co-champion	UC-Santa Barbara	18th	2017

At-large bids
Region	Team	Appearance	Last Bid
I	College of New Jersey	4th	2012
I	Northeastern	2nd	2017
II	NC State	2nd	2014
III	Michigan State	14th	2016
III	Ohio State	18th	2017
IV	Texas A&M	19th	2017
VI	UC-Berkeley	4th	2012
VI	UC-Davis	4th	2017

=== Men's lottery ===
Full men's lottery selections
Region	Team	Selection Type	Bid result
I	UConn	Automatic	Accepted
I	Pitt	Automatic	Championship
I	Cornell	Automatic	Accepted
I	Carnegie Mellon	Automatic	Accepted
I	Villanova	Waitlist	Accepted from waitlist
I	The College of New Jersey	Waitlist	Not given
I	St. Johns	Waitlist	Not given
I	Northeastern	Waitlist	Not given
I	Fordham	Waitlist	Championship
I	UMass	Waitlist	Not given
I	George Mason	Waitlist	Not given
I	Ithaca	Waitlist	Not given
I	Stoney Brook	Waitlist	Not given
I	Monmouth	Waitlist	Not given
I	Towson	Waitlist	Not given
I	Vermont	Waitlist	Not given
I	SUNY Brockport	Waitlist	Not given
I	Hamilton	Waitlist	Not given
I	UPenn	Waitlist	Not given
I	Brown	Waitlist	Not given
II	Georgia College	Automatic	Accepted
II	Miami	Automatic	Accepted
II	Northern Kentucky	Automatic	Not accepted
II	UNC-Greensboro	Automatic	Not accepted
II	Virginia Tech	Waitlist	Championship
II	Florida State	Waitlist	Not accepted
II	High Point	Waitlist	Accepted from waitlist
II	JMU	Waitlist	Accepted from waitlist
III	Dayton	Automatic	Not accepted
III	Illinois	Automatic	Accepted
III	Butler	Automatic	Accepted
III	Cincinnati	Automatic	Championship
III	Notre Dame	Waitlist	Not accepted
III	Xavier	Waitlist	Accepted from waitlist
III	Ohio	Waitlist	Not given
III	Purdue	Waitlist	Not given
III	Miami (OH)	Waitlist	Not given
IV	LSU	Automatic	Accepted
IV	Kansas	Automatic	Accepted
IV	Texas	Automatic	Championship
IV	Missouri	Automatic	Accepted
IV	Creighton	Waitlist	Not accepted
IV	Houston CC	Waitlist	Accepted from waitlist
IV	WashU	Waitlist	Not given
V	Northern Iowa (UNI)	Automatic	Accepted
V	Colorado College	Automatic	Accepted
V	Iowa State	Automatic	Accepted
V	Minnesota State-Mankato	Automatic	Accepted
V	Colorado State	Waitlist	Championship
V	Minnesota	Waitlist	Accepted from waitlist
V	Air Force	Waitlist	Not given
V	Denver	Waitlist	Not given
V	Wyoming	Waitlist	Not given
V	Minnesota-Duluth	Waitlist	Not given
V	Colorado	Waitlist	Championship
V	CSU-Pueblo	Waitlist	Not given
V	Colorado Mines	Waitlist	Not given
VI	Cal State-Fullerton	Automatic	Accepted
VI	San Diego State	Automatic	Accepted
VI	Utah Valley	Automatic	Accepted
VI	UCLA	Automatic	Accepted
VI	Oregon	Waitlist	Championship

Participating men's lottery teams
Region	Team	Selection Type	Bid result
I	UConn	Automatic	Accepted
I	Cornell	Automatic	Accepted
I	Carnegie Mellon	Automatic	Accepted
I	Villanova	Waitlist	Accepted from waitlist
II	Georgia College	Automatic	Accepted
II	Miami	Automatic	Accepted
II	High Point	Waitlist	Accepted from waitlist
II	JMU	Waitlist	Accepted from waitlist
III	Illinois	Automatic	Accepted
III	Butler	Automatic	Accepted
III	Xavier	Waitlist	Accepted from waitlist
IV	LSU	Automatic	Accepted
IV	Kansas	Automatic	Accepted
IV	Missouri	Automatic	Accepted
IV	Houston CC	Waitlist	Accepted from waitlist
V	Northern Iowa (UNI)	Automatic	Accepted
V	Colorado College	Automatic	Accepted
V	Iowa State	Automatic	Accepted
V	Minnesota State-Mankato	Automatic	Accepted
V	Minnesota	Waitlist	Accepted from waitlist
VI	Cal State-Fullerton	Automatic	Accepted
VI	San Diego State	Automatic	Accepted
VI	Utah Valley	Automatic	Accepted
VI	UCLA	Automatic	Accepted

=== Women's lottery ===
Full women's lottery selections
Region	Team	Selection Type	Bid result
I	Vermont	Waitlist	Accepted from waitlist
I	Stony Brook	Waitlist	Not accepted
I	Maryland	Waitlist	Accepted from waitlist
I	Cornell	Waitlist	Not given
I	Pitt	Waitlist	Not given
I	Central Connecticut State	Waitlist	Not given
I	Fordham	Waitlist	Championship
I	UPenn	Waitlist	Not given
I	George Mason	Waitlist	Not given
I	Umass-Amherst	Waitlist	Not given
I	Widener	Waitlist	Not given
I	Syracuse	Waitlist	Not given
I	Binghampton	Waitlist	Not given
I	Loyola (MD)	Waitlist	Not given
I	West Virginia	Waitlist	Not given
I	Worcester Poly	Waitlist	Not given
I	Adelphi	Waitlist	Not given
I	The College of New Jersey	Waitlist	Not given
II	Virginia Tech	Automatic	Accepted
II	JMU	Automatic	Accepted
II	Georgia Tech	Automatic	Accepted
II	Florida Gulf Coast	Automatic	Not accepted
II	Emory	Waitlist	Not accepted
II	High Point	Waitlist	Not accepted
II	Miami	Waitlist	Not accepted
II	Tennessee	Waitlist	Not accepted
II	Kennesaw State	Waitlist	Accepted from waitlist
III	Dayton	Automatic	Not accepted
III	Iowa	Automatic	Accepted
III	Cincinnati	Automatic	Accepted
III	Grand Valley	Automatic	Accepted
III	Ohio	Waitlist	Not accepted
III	Purdue	Waitlist	Accepted from waitlist
III	Illinois	Waitlist	Championship
III	UW-Milwaukee	Waitlist	Not given
III	Miami (OH)	Waitlist	Not given
III	Loyola Chicago	Waitlist	Not given
III	Notre Dame	Waitlist	Not given
IV	Wash U	Automatic	Championship
IV	Missouri	Automatic	Accepted
IV	SIU Edwardsville	Automatic	Not accepted
IV	Texas Tech	Automatic	Accepted
IV	Kansas	Waitlist	Championship
IV	SMU	Waitlist	Not accepted
IV	Missouri State	Waitlist	Accepted from waitlist
IV	Rice	Waitlist	Not given
IV	Creighton	Waitlist	Not given
IV	Texas	Waitlist	Championship
V	Colorado Mines	Automatic	Accepted
V	Colorado Springs	Automatic	Accepted
V	Iowa State	Automatic	Championship
V	Denver	Automatic	Accepted
V	Minnesota	Waitlist	Accepted from waitlist
V	Colorado State	Waitlist	Championship
V	Air Force	Waitlist	Not given
V	Colorado	Waitlist	Championship
VI	San Diego State	Automatic	Accepted
VI	Oregon	Automatic	Accepted
VI	UCLA	Automatic	Accepted
VI	UC-Santa Barbara	Automatic	Championship
VI	USC	Waitlist	Accepted from waitlist
VI	UC-Berkeley	Waitlist	Championship

Participating women's lottery teams
Region	Team	Selection Type	Bid result
I	Boston College	Automatic	Accepted
I	Penn State	Automatic	Accepted from championship
I	Towson	Waitlist	Accepted from waitlist
I	Vermont	Waitlist	Accepted from waitlist
I	Maryland	Waitlist	Accepted from waitlist
II	Virginia Tech	Automatic	Accepted
II	JMU	Automatic	Accepted
II	Georgia Tech	Automatic	Accepted
II	Kennesaw State	Waitlist	Accepted from waitlist
III	Iowa	Automatic	Accepted
III	Cincinnati	Automatic	Accepted
III	Grand Valley	Automatic	Accepted
III	Purdue	Waitlist	Accepted from waitlist
IV	Missouri	Automatic	Accepted
IV	Texas Tech	Automatic	Accepted
IV	Missouri State	Waitlist	Accepted from waitlist
V	Colorado Mines	Automatic	Accepted
V	Colorado Springs	Automatic	Accepted
V	Denver	Automatic	Accepted
V	Minnesota	Waitlist	Accepted from waitlist
VI	San Diego State	Automatic	Accepted
VI	Oregon	Automatic	Accepted
VI	UCLA	Automatic	Accepted
VI	USC	Waitlist	Accepted from waitlist

== Group stage ==
=== Men's championship ===
Group A
Pos	Team	Pld	W	D	L	GF	GA	GD	Pts	Qualification
1	North Carolina	2	1	1	0	8	3	+5	4	Advanced to knockout stage
2	Colorado State	2	1	1	0	5	4	+1	4	Advanced to knockout stage
3	San Jose State	2	0	0	2	3	9	−6	0	Consolation

Scores

8:00am CST	Colorado State	2–2	North Carolina	Field 2
Thu, November 29		Report		Stadium: Foley Tourism Complex; Foley, Alabama

1:15pm CST	North Carolina	6–1	San Jose State	Field 8
Thu, November 29		Report		Stadium: Foley Tourism Complex; Foley, Alabama

6:30pm CST	San Jose State	2–3	Colorado State	Field 3
Thu, November 29		Report		Stadium: Foley Tourism Complex; Foley, Alabama

Group B
Pos	Team	Pld	W	D	L	GF	GA	GD	Pts	Qualification
1	Virginia Tech	2	1	0	1	4	3	+1	3	Advanced to knockout stage
2	Oregon	2	1	0	1	2	2	0	3	Advanced to knockout stage
3	Illinois	2	1	0	1	2	3	−1	3	Consolation

Scores

8:00am CST	Virginia Tech	3–1	Illinois	Field 3
Thu, November 29		Report		Stadium: Foley Tourism Complex; Foley, Alabama

1:15pm CST	Illinois	1–0	Oregon	Field 9
Thu, November 29		Report		Stadium: Foley Tourism Complex; Foley, Alabama

6:30pm CST	Oregon	2–1	Virginia Tech	Field 2
Thu, November 29		Report		Stadium: Foley Tourism Complex; Foley, Alabama

Group C
Pos	Team	Pld	W	D	L	GF	GA	GD	Pts	Qualification
1	Michigan	2	2	0	0	8	3	+5	6	Advanced to knockout stage
2	Fordham	2	1	0	1	4	3	+1	3	Advanced to knockout stage
3	Arizona	2	0	0	2	3	9	−6	0	Consolation

Scores

8:00am CST	Michigan	6–2	Arizona	Field 8
Thu, November 29		Report		Stadium: Foley Tourism Complex; Foley, Alabama

1:15pm CST	Arizona	1–3	Fordham	Field 2
Thu, November 29		Report		Stadium: Foley Tourism Complex; Foley, Alabama

6:30pm CST	Fordham	1–2	Michigan	Field 9
Thu, November 29		Report		Stadium: Foley Tourism Complex; Foley, Alabama

Group D
Pos	Team	Pld	W	D	L	GF	GA	GD	Pts	Qualification
1	BYU	2	2	0	0	7	2	+5	6	Advanced to knockout stage
2	Virginia	2	1	0	1	3	4	−1	3	Advanced to knockout stage
3	Pittsburgh	2	0	0	2	0	4	−4	0	Consolation

Scores

8:00am CST	Virginia	2–4	BYU	Field 9
Thu, November 29		Report		Stadium: Foley Tourism Complex; Foley, Alabama

1:15pm CST	BYU	3–0	Pittsburgh	Field 3
Thu, November 29		Report		Stadium: Foley Tourism Complex; Foley, Alabama

6:30pm CST	Pittsburgh	0–1	Virginia	Field 8
Thu, November 29		Report		Stadium: Foley Tourism Complex; Foley, Alabama

Group E
Pos	Team	Pld	W	D	L	GF	GA	GD	Pts	Qualification
1	UC Davis	2	2	0	0	2	0	+2	6	Advanced to knockout stage
2	Michigan State	2	1	0	1	4	1	+3	3	Advanced to knockout stage
3	Texas–Rio Grande Valley	2	0	0	2	0	5	−5	0	Consolation

Scores

9:45am CST	UC Davis	1–0	UTRGV	Field 2
Thu, November 29		Report		Stadium: Foley Tourism Complex; Foley, Alabama

3:00pm CST	UTRGV	0–4	Michigan State	Field 8
Thu, November 29		Report		Stadium: Foley Tourism Complex; Foley, Alabama

8:15pm CST	Michigan State	0–1	UC Davis	Field 3
Thu, November 29		Report		Stadium: Foley Tourism Complex; Foley, Alabama

Group F
Pos	Team	Pld	W	D	L	GF	GA	GD	Pts	Qualification
1	Ohio State	2	2	0	0	4	0	+4	6	Advanced to knockout stage
2	Colorado	2	1	0	1	2	4	−2	3	Advanced to knockout stage
3	Delaware	2	0	0	2	1	3	−2	0	Consolation

Scores

9:45am CST	Delaware	0–1	Ohio State	Field 3
Thu, November 29		Report		Stadium: Foley Tourism Complex; Foley, Alabama

3:00pm CST	Ohio State	3–0	Colorado	Field 9
Thu, November 29		Report		Stadium: Foley Tourism Complex; Foley, Alabama

8:15pm CST	Colorado	2–1	Delaware	Field 2
Thu, November 29		Report		Stadium: Foley Tourism Complex; Foley, Alabama

Group G
Pos	Team	Pld	W	D	L	GF	GA	GD	Pts	Qualification
1	Wisconsin	2	2	0	0	5	1	+4	6	Advanced to knockout stage
2	Cal Poly	2	1	0	1	3	2	+1	3	Advanced to knockout stage
3	Texas Tech	2	0	0	2	2	7	−5	0	Consolation

Scores

9:45am CST	Wisconsin	1–0	Cal Poly	Field 8
Thu, November 29		Report		Stadium: Foley Tourism Complex; Foley, Alabama

3:00pm CST	Cal Poly	3–1	Texas Tech	Field 2
Thu, November 29		Report		Stadium: Foley Tourism Complex; Foley, Alabama

8:15pm CST	Texas Tech	1–4	Wisconsin	Field 9
Thu, November 29		Report		Stadium: Foley Tourism Complex; Foley, Alabama

Group H
Pos	Team	Pld	W	D	L	GF	GA	GD	Pts	Qualification
1	Texas	2	2	0	0	2	0	+2	6	Advanced to knockout stage
2	Florida	2	1	0	1	3	3	0	3	Advanced to knockout stage
3	Cincinnati	2	0	0	2	2	4	−2	0	Consolation

Scores

9:45am CST	Texas	1–0	Cincinnati	Field 9
Thu, November 29		Report		Stadium: Foley Tourism Complex; Foley, Alabama

3:00pm CST	Cincinnati	2–3	Florida	Field 3
Thu, November 29		Report		Stadium: Foley Tourism Complex; Foley, Alabama

8:15pm CST	Florida	0–1	Texas	Field 8
Thu, November 29		Report		Stadium: Foley Tourism Complex; Foley, Alabama

=== Women's championship ===
Group A
Pos	Team	Pld	W	D	L	GF	GA	GD	Pts	Qualification
1	UC-Santa Barbara	2	2	0	0	3	0	+3	6	Advanced to knockout stage
2	Ohio State	2	1	0	1	1	2	−1	3	Advanced to knockout stage
3	Virginia	2	0	0	2	0	2	−2	0	Consolation

Scores

8:00am CST	UCSB	2–0	Ohio State	Field 4
Thu, November 29		Report		Stadium: Foley Tourism Complex; Foley, Alabama

1:15pm CST	Ohio State	1–0	Virginia	Field 10
Thu, November 29		Report		Stadium: Foley Tourism Complex; Foley, Alabama

6:30pm CST	Virginia	0–1	UCSB	Field 5
Thu, November 29		Report		Stadium: Foley Tourism Complex; Foley, Alabama

Group B
Pos	Team	Pld	W	D	L	GF	GA	GD	Pts	Qualification
1	Illinois	2	2	0	0	5	0	+5	6	Advanced to knockout stage
2	Fordham	2	0	1	1	1	3	−2	1	Advanced to knockout stage
3	NC State	2	0	1	1	1	4	−3	1	Consolation

Scores

8:00am CST	Illinois	3–0	NC State	Field 5
Thu, November 29		Report		Stadium: Foley Tourism Complex; Foley, Alabama

1:15pm CST	NC State	1–1	Fordham	Field 11
Thu, November 29		Report		Stadium: Foley Tourism Complex; Foley, Alabama

6:30pm CST	Fordham	0–2	Illinois	Field 4
Thu, November 29		Report		Stadium: Foley Tourism Complex; Foley, Alabama

Group C
Pos	Team	Pld	W	D	L	GF	GA	GD	Pts	Qualification
1	Colorado	2	2	0	0	5	2	+3	6	Advanced to knockout stage
2	Gonzaga	2	1	0	1	4	3	+1	3	Advanced to knockout stage
3	Northeastern	2	0	0	2	1	5	−4	0	Consolation

Scores

8:00am CST	Colorado	2–1	Northeastern	Field 10
Thu, November 29		Report		Stadium: Foley Tourism Complex; Foley, Alabama

1:15pm CST	Northeastern	0–3	Gonzaga	Field 4
Thu, November 29		Report		Stadium: Foley Tourism Complex; Foley, Alabama

6:30pm CST	Gonzaga	1–3	Colorado	Field 11
Thu, November 29		Report		Stadium: Foley Tourism Complex; Foley, Alabama

Group D
Pos	Team	Pld	W	D	L	GF	GA	GD	Pts	Qualification
1	Texas	2	1	1	0	3	0	+3	4	Advanced to knockout stage
2	Michigan State	2	1	1	0	3	1	+2	4	Advanced to knockout stage
3	The College of New Jersey	2	0	0	2	1	6	−5	0	Consolation

Scores

8:00am CST	Texas	0–0	Michigan State	Field 11
Thu, November 29		Report		Stadium: Foley Tourism Complex; Foley, Alabama

1:15pm CST	Michigan State	3–1	TCNJ	Field 5
Thu, November 29		Report		Stadium: Foley Tourism Complex; Foley, Alabama

6:30pm CST	TCNJ	0–3	Texas	Field 10
Thu, November 29		Report		Stadium: Foley Tourism Complex; Foley, Alabama

Group E
Pos	Team	Pld	W	D	L	GF	GA	GD	Pts	Qualification
1	UC-Berkeley	2	2	0	0	4	2	+2	6	Advanced to knockout stage
2	North Carolina	2	1	0	1	2	1	+1	3	Advanced to knockout stage
3	WashU	2	0	0	2	2	5	−3	0	Consolation

Scores

9:45am CST	North Carolina	0–1	UC-Berkeley	Field 4
Thu, November 29		Report		Stadium: Foley Tourism Complex; Foley, Alabama

3:00pm CST	UC-Berkeley	3–2	Wash U	Field 10
Thu, November 29		Report		Stadium: Foley Tourism Complex; Foley, Alabama

8:15pm CST	Wash U	0–2	North Carolina	Field 5
Thu, November 29		Report		Stadium: Foley Tourism Complex; Foley, Alabama

Group F
Pos	Team	Pld	W	D	L	GF	GA	GD	Pts	Qualification
1	Michigan	2	1	1	0	4	1	+3	4	Advanced to knockout stage
2	UConn	2	1	1	0	2	1	+1	4	Advanced to knockout stage
3	Texas A & M	2	0	0	2	0	4	−4	0	Consolation

Scores

9:45am CST	Michigan	3–0	Texas A & M	Field 5
Thu, November 29		Report		Stadium: Foley Tourism Complex; Foley, Alabama

3:00pm CST	Texas A & M	0–1	UConn	Field 11
Thu, November 29		Report		Stadium: Foley Tourism Complex; Foley, Alabama

8:15pm CST	UConn	1–1	Michigan	Field 4
Thu, November 29		Report		Stadium: Foley Tourism Complex; Foley, Alabama

Group G
Pos	Team	Pld	W	D	L	GF	GA	GD	Pts	Qualification
1	Colorado State	2	1	1	0	2	0	+2	4	Advanced to knockout stage
2	Clemson	2	1	0	1	1	2	−1	3	Advanced to knockout stage
3	Kansas	2	0	1	1	0	1	−1	1	Consolation

Scores

9:45am CST	Colorado State	0–0	Kansas	Field 10
Thu, November 29		Report		Stadium: Foley Tourism Complex; Foley, Alabama

3:00pm CST	Kansas	0–1	Clemson	Field 4
Thu, November 29		Report		Stadium: Foley Tourism Complex; Foley, Alabama

8:15pm CST	Clemson	0–2	Colorado State	Field 11
Thu, November 29		Report		Stadium: Foley Tourism Complex; Foley, Alabama

Group H
Pos	Team	Pld	W	D	L	GF	GA	GD	Pts	Qualification
1	UC-Davis	2	2	0	0	8	1	+6 (Note: Actual GD differs because the max GD for any one game is ±5, which came into effect when UC-Davis beat Iowa State 6–0)	6	Advanced to knockout stage
2	Wisconsin	2	1	0	1	5	3	+2	3	Advanced to knockout stage
3	Iowa State	2	0	0	2	1	10	−8	0	Consolation

Scores

9:45am CST	UC Davis	6–0	Iowa State	Field 11
Thu, November 29		Report		Stadium: Foley Tourism Complex; Foley, Alabama

3:00pm CST	Iowa State	1–4	Wisconsin	Field 5
Thu, November 29		Report		Stadium: Foley Tourism Complex; Foley, Alabama

8:15pm CST	Wisconsin	1–2	UC Davis	Field 10
Thu, November 29		Report		Stadium: Foley Tourism Complex; Foley, Alabama

=== Men's open ===
Group A
Pos	Team	Pld	W	D	L	GF	GA	GD	Pts	Qualification
1	Miami (FL)	3	3	0	0	10	2	+7 (Note: Actual GD differs because the max GD for any one game is ±5, which came into effect when Miami (FL) beat Minnesota State 6–0)	9	Advanced to knockout stage
2	Missouri	3	2	0	1	5	2	+3	6	
3	CSU Fullerton	3	1	0	2	6	3	+3	3	
4	Minnesota State	3	0	0	3	0	14	−13	0	

Scores

8:00am CST	Miami (FL)	6–0	Minnesota State	Field 13
Thu, November 29		Report		Stadium: Foley Tourism Complex; Foley, Alabama

8:00am CST	Missouri	1–0	CSU Fullerton	Field 14
Thu, November 29		Report		Stadium: Foley Tourism Complex; Foley, Alabama

3:00pm CST	CSU Fullerton	1–2	Miami (FL)	Field 15
Thu, November 29		Report		Stadium: Foley Tourism Complex; Foley, Alabama

3:00pm CST	Minnesota State	0–3	Missouri	Field 16
Thu, November 29		Report		Stadium: Foley Tourism Complex; Foley, Alabama

8:00am CST	Miami (FL)	2–1	Missouri	Field 10
Fri, November 30		Report		Stadium: Foley Tourism Complex; Foley, Alabama

8:00am CST	CSU Fullerton	5–0	Minnesota State	Field 11
Fri, November 30		Report		Stadium: Foley Tourism Complex; Foley, Alabama

Notes:

Group B
Pos	Team	Pld	W	D	L	GF	GA	GD	Pts	Qualification
1	Illinois "Blue"	3	3	0	0	6	0	+6	9	Advanced to knockout stage
2	Cornell	3	2	0	1	7	3	+4	6	
3	Northern Iowa	3	1	0	2	4	8	−4	3	
4	Houston CC	3	0	0	3	0	6	−6	0	

Scores

8:00am CST	Illinois "Blue"	2–0	Houston CC	Field 15
Thu, November 29		Report		Stadium: Foley Tourism Complex; Foley, Alabama

8:00am CST	Cornell	5–2	Northern Iowa	Field 16
Thu, November 29		Report		Stadium: Foley Tourism Complex; Foley, Alabama

3:00pm CST	Northern Iowa	0–3	Illinois "Blue"	Field 6
Thu, November 29		Report		Stadium: Foley Tourism Complex; Foley, Alabama

3:00pm CST	Houston CC	0–2	Cornell	Field 7
Thu, November 29		Report		Stadium: Foley Tourism Complex; Foley, Alabama

8:00am CST	Illinois "Blue"	1–0	Cornell	Field 13
Fri, November 30		Report		Stadium: Foley Tourism Complex; Foley, Alabama

8:00am CST	Northern Iowa	2–0	Houston CC	Field 14
Fri, November 30		Report		Stadium: Foley Tourism Complex; Foley, Alabama

Group C
Pos	Team	Pld	W	D	L	GF	GA	GD	Pts	Qualification
1	San Diego State	3	3	0	0	6	1	+5	9	Advanced to knockout stage
2	Villanova	3	1	0	2	3	4	−1	3	
3	Georgia College	3	1	0	2	3	4	−1	3	
4	LSU	3	1	0	2	1	4	−3	3	

Scores

8:00am CST	San Diego State	2–0	Georgia College	Field 6
Thu, November 29		Report		Stadium: Foley Tourism Complex; Foley, Alabama

8:00am CST	LSU	1–0	Villanova	Field 7
Thu, November 29		Report		Stadium: Foley Tourism Complex; Foley, Alabama

3:00pm CST	Villanova	1–2	San Diego State	Field 13
Thu, November 29		Report		Stadium: Foley Tourism Complex; Foley, Alabama

3:00pm CST	Georgia College	2–0	LSU	Field 14
Thu, November 29		Report		Stadium: Foley Tourism Complex; Foley, Alabama

8:00am CST	San Diego State	2–0	LSU	Field 15
Fri, November 30		Report		Stadium: Foley Tourism Complex; Foley, Alabama

8:00am CST	Villanova	2–1	Georgia College	Field 16
Fri, November 30		Report		Stadium: Foley Tourism Complex; Foley, Alabama

Group D
Pos	Team	Pld	W	D	L	GF	GA	GD	Pts	Qualification
1	Minnesota	3	3	0	0	14	2	+9 (Note: Actual GD differs because the max GD for any one game is ±5, which came into effect when Minnesota beat High Point 9–1)	9	Advanced to knockout stage
2	Utah Valley	3	2	0	1	16	6	+4 (Note: Actual GD differs because the max GD for any one game is ±5, which came into effect when Utah Valley beat High Point 14–3)	6	Advanced to knockout stage
3	Kansas	3	1	0	2	3	4	−1	3	
4	High Point	3	0	0	3	4	25	−12	0	

Scores

9:45am CST	Minnesota	9–1	High Point	Field 13
Thu, November 29		Report		Stadium: Foley Tourism Complex; Foley, Alabama

9:45am CST	Kansas	0–2	Utah Valley	Field 14
Thu, November 29		Report		Stadium: Foley Tourism Complex; Foley, Alabama

4:45pm CST	Utah Valley	0–3	Minnesota	Field 15
Thu, November 29		Report		Stadium: Foley Tourism Complex; Foley, Alabama

4:45pm CST	High Point	0–2	Kansas	Field 16
Thu, November 29		Report		Stadium: Foley Tourism Complex; Foley, Alabama

8:00am CST	Minnesota	2–1	Kansas	Field 6
Fri, November 30		Report		Stadium: Foley Tourism Complex; Foley, Alabama

8:00am CST	Utah Valley	14–3	High Point	Field 7
Fri, November 30		Report		Stadium: Foley Tourism Complex; Foley, Alabama

Notes:

Group E
Pos	Team	Pld	W	D	L	GF	GA	GD	Pts	Qualification
1	JMU	3	3	0	0	16	0	+12 (Note: Actual GD differs because the max GD for any one game is ±5, which came into effect when JMU beat Butler 7–0) (Note: Actual GD differs because the max GD for any one game is ±5, which came into effect when JMU beat Colorado College 7–0)	9	Advanced to knockout stage
2	UConn	3	2	0	1	14	2	+8 (Note: Actual GD differs because the max GD for any one game is ±5, which came into effect when UConn beat Colorado College 9–0)	6	Advanced to knockout stage
3	Butler	3	1	0	2	3	13	−8	3	
4	Colorado College	3	0	0	3	1	19	−12	0	

Scores

9:45am CST	JMU	7–0	Butler	Field 15
Thu, November 29		Report		Stadium: Foley Tourism Complex; Foley, Alabama

9:45am CST	UConn	9–0	Colorado College	Field 16
Thu, November 29		Report		Stadium: Foley Tourism Complex; Foley, Alabama

4:45pm CST	Colorado College	0–7	JMU	Field 6
Thu, November 29		Report		Stadium: Foley Tourism Complex; Foley, Alabama

4:45pm CST	Butler	0–5	UConn	Field 7
Thu, November 29		Report		Stadium: Foley Tourism Complex; Foley, Alabama

8:00am CST	JMU	2–0	UConn	Field 4
Fri, November 30		Report		Stadium: Foley Tourism Complex; Foley, Alabama

8:00am CST	Colorado College	1–3	Butler	Field 5
Fri, November 30		Report		Stadium: Foley Tourism Complex; Foley, Alabama

Notes:

Group F
Pos	Team	Pld	W	D	L	GF	GA	GD	Pts	Qualification
1	UCLA	3	3	0	0	11	0	+11	9	Advanced to knockout stage
2	Iowa State	3	2	0	1	4	3	+1	6	
3	Xavier	3	1	0	2	3	7	−4	3	
4	Carnegie Mellon	3	0	0	3	2	10	−8	0	

Scores

9:45am CST	UCLA	5–0	Carnegie Mellon	Field 6
Thu, November 29		Report		Stadium: Foley Tourism Complex; Foley, Alabama

9:45am CST	Iowa State	2–0	Xavier	Field 7
Thu, November 29		Report		Stadium: Foley Tourism Complex; Foley, Alabama

4:45pm CST	Xavier	0–4	UCLA	Field 13
Thu, November 29		Report		Stadium: Foley Tourism Complex; Foley, Alabama

4:45pm CST	Carnegie Mellon	1–2	Iowa State	Field 14
Thu, November 29		Report		Stadium: Foley Tourism Complex; Foley, Alabama

8:00am CST	UCLA	2–0	Iowa State	Field 8
Fri, November 30		Report		Stadium: Foley Tourism Complex; Foley, Alabama

8:00am CST	Xavier	3–1	Carnegie Mellon	Field 9
Fri, November 30		Report		Stadium: Foley Tourism Complex; Foley, Alabama

=== Women's open ===
Group A
Pos	Team	Pld	W	D	L	GF	GA	GD	Pts	Qualification
1	Oregon	3	3	0	0	13	2	+11	9	Advanced to knockout stage
2	Vermont	3	2	0	1	4	2	+2	6	
3	Iowa	3	1	0	2	3	6	−3	3	
4	Missouri State	3	0	0	3	1	11	−10	0	

Scores

11:30am CST	Oregon	6–1	Missouri State	Field 13
Thu, November 29		Report		Stadium: Foley Tourism Complex; Foley, Alabama

11:30am CST	Iowa	0–1	Vermont	Field 14
Thu, November 29		Report		Stadium: Foley Tourism Complex; Foley, Alabama

6:30pm CST	Vermont	0–2	Oregon	Field 15
Thu, November 29		Report		Stadium: Foley Tourism Complex; Foley, Alabama

6:30pm CST	Missouri State	0–2	Iowa	Field 16
Thu, November 29		Report		Stadium: Foley Tourism Complex; Foley, Alabama

10:00am CST	Oregon	5–1	Iowa	Field 6
Fri, November 30		Report		Stadium: Foley Tourism Complex; Foley, Alabama

10:00am CST	Vermont	3–0	Missouri State	Field 7
Fri, November 30		Report		Stadium: Foley Tourism Complex; Foley, Alabama

Group B
Pos	Team	Pld	W	D	L	GF	GA	GD	Pts	Qualification
1	UCLA	3	3	0	0	9	3	+6	9	Advanced to knockout stage
2	Penn State	3	2	0	1	4	3	+1	6	
3	Minnesota	3	0	1	2	1	3	−2	1	
4	Purdue	3	0	1	2	0	5	−5	1	

Scores

11:30am CST	Penn State	1–0	Minnesota	Field 15
Thu, November 29		Report		Stadium: Foley Tourism Complex; Foley, Alabama

11:30am CST	UCLA	4–0	Purdue	Field 16
Thu, November 29		Report		Stadium: Foley Tourism Complex; Foley, Alabama

6:30pm CST	Purdue	0–1	Penn State	Field 6
Thu, November 29		Report		Stadium: Foley Tourism Complex; Foley, Alabama

6:30pm CST	Minnesota	1–2	UCLA	Field 7
Thu, November 29		Report		Stadium: Foley Tourism Complex; Foley, Alabama

10:00am CST	Penn State	2–3	UCLA	Field 13
Fri, November 30		Report		Stadium: Foley Tourism Complex; Foley, Alabama

10:00am CST	Purdue	0–0	Minnesota	Field 14
Fri, November 30		Report		Stadium: Foley Tourism Complex; Foley, Alabama

Group C
Pos	Team	Pld	W	D	L	GF	GA	GD	Pts	Qualification
1	Cincinnati	3	3	0	0	12	1	+10 (Note: Actual GD differs because the max GD for any one game is ±5, which came into effect when Cincinnati beat Texas Tech 6–0)	9	Advanced to knockout stage
2	Virginia Tech	3	2	0	1	8	2	+6	6	
3	Towson	3	1	0	2	2	8	−6	3	
4	Texas Tech	3	0	0	3	1	12	−10	0	

Scores

11:30am CST	Virginia Tech	3–0	Towson	Field 6
Thu, November 29		Report		Stadium: Foley Tourism Complex; Foley, Alabama

11:30am CST	Cincinnati	6–0	Texas Tech	Field 7
Thu, November 29		Report		Stadium: Foley Tourism Complex; Foley, Alabama

6:30pm CST	Texas Tech	0–4	Virginia Tech	Field 13
Thu, November 29		Report		Stadium: Foley Tourism Complex; Foley, Alabama

6:30pm CST	Towson	0–4	Cincinnati	Field 14
Thu, November 29		Report		Stadium: Foley Tourism Complex; Foley, Alabama

10:00am CST	Virginia Tech	1–2	Cincinnati	Field 15
Fri, November 30		Report		Stadium: Foley Tourism Complex; Foley, Alabama

10:00am CST	Texas Tech	1–2	Towson	Field 16
Fri, November 30		Report		Stadium: Foley Tourism Complex; Foley, Alabama

Notes:

Group D
Pos	Team	Pld	W	D	L	GF	GA	GD	Pts	Qualification
1	Grand Valley	3	3	0	0	6	0	+6	9	Advanced to knockout stage
2	JMU	3	2	0	1	11	1	+9 (Note: Actual GD differs because the max GD for any one game is ±5, which came into effect when JMU beat Missouri 6–0)	6	Advanced to knockout stage
3	Missouri	3	1	0	2	3	9	−5	3	
4	Denver	3	0	0	3	0	10	−10	0	

Scores

1:15pm CST	James Madison	5–0	Denver	Field 13
Thu, November 29		Report		Stadium: Foley Tourism Complex; Foley, Alabama

1:15pm CST	Grand Valley	3–0	Missouri	Field 14
Thu, November 29		Report		Stadium: Foley Tourism Complex; Foley, Alabama

8:15pm CST	Missouri	0–6	James Madison	Field 15
Thu, November 29		Report		Stadium: Foley Tourism Complex; Foley, Alabama

8:15pm CST	Denver	0–2	Grand Valley	Field 16
Thu, November 29		Report		Stadium: Foley Tourism Complex; Foley, Alabama

12:00pm CST	James Madison	0–1	Grand Valley	Field 6
Fri, November 30		Report		Stadium: Foley Tourism Complex; Foley, Alabama

12:00pm CST	Missouri	3–0	Denver	Field 7
Fri, November 30		Report		Stadium: Foley Tourism Complex; Foley, Alabama

Notes:

Group E
Pos	Team	Pld	W	D	L	GF	GA	GD	Pts	Qualification
1	San Diego State	3	3	0	0	6	0	+6	9	Advanced to knockout stage
2	Georgia Tech	3	2	0	1	3	3	0	6	
3	Colorado Mines	3	0	1	2	1	4	−3	1	
4	Maryland	3	0	1	2	0	3	−3	1	

Scores

1:15pm CST	San Diego State	2–0	Georgia Tech	Field 15
Thu, November 29		Report		Stadium: Foley Tourism Complex; Foley, Alabama

1:15pm CST	Colorado Mines	0–0	Maryland	Field 16
Thu, November 29		Report		Stadium: Foley Tourism Complex; Foley, Alabama

8:15pm CST	Maryland	0–2	San Diego State	Field 6
Thu, November 29		Report		Stadium: Foley Tourism Complex; Foley, Alabama

8:15pm CST	Georgia Tech	2–1	Colorado Mines	Field 7
Thu, November 29		Report		Stadium: Foley Tourism Complex; Foley, Alabama

12:00pm CST	San Diego State	2–0	Colorado Mines	Field 13
Fri, November 30		Report		Stadium: Foley Tourism Complex; Foley, Alabama

12:00pm CST	Maryland	0–1	Georgia Tech	Field 14
Fri, November 30		Report		Stadium: Foley Tourism Complex; Foley, Alabama

Group F
Pos	Team	Pld	W	D	L	GF	GA	GD	Pts	Qualification
1	Boston College	3	2	1	0	10	1	+9	7	Advanced to knockout stage
2	Southern California (USC)	3	2	1	0	11	1	+8 (Note: Actual GD differs because the max GD for any one game is ±5, which came into effect when USC beat Kennesaw State 7–0)	7	Advanced to knockout stage
3	Colorado Springs	3	0	1	2	0	8	−8	1	
4	Kennesaw State	3	0	1	2	0	11	−9	1	

Scores

1:15pm CST	USC	7–0	Kennesaw State	Field 6
Thu, November 29		Report		Stadium: Foley Tourism Complex; Foley, Alabama

1:15pm CST	Boston College	5–0	Colorado Springs	Field 7
Thu, November 29		Report		Stadium: Foley Tourism Complex; Foley, Alabama

8:15pm CST	Colorado Springs	0–3	USC	Field 13
Thu, November 29		Report		Stadium: Foley Tourism Complex; Foley, Alabama

8:15pm CST	Kennesaw State	0–4	Boston College	Field 14
Thu, November 29		Report		Stadium: Foley Tourism Complex; Foley, Alabama

12:00pm CST	USC	1–1	Boston College	Field 15
Fri, November 30		Report		Stadium: Foley Tourism Complex; Foley, Alabama

12:00pm CST	Colorado Springs	0–0	Kennesaw State	Field 16
Fri, November 30		Report		Stadium: Foley Tourism Complex; Foley, Alabama

== Tournament bracket ==
=== Men's championship ===
Sweet 16; Nov. 30, 2018; Foley, AL
Fri • 10:00am • Field 2
North Carolina	2
Virginia	0
Fri • 10:00am • Field 3
Texas	1
Michigan State	2
Fri • 10:00am • Field 8
Wisconsin	1
Colorado	0
Fri • 10:00am • Field 9
Virginia Tech	6
Fordham	0
Fri • 12:00pm • Field 2
Michigan	2
Oregon	3
Fri • 12:00pm • Field 3
Ohio State	3
Cal Poly	1
Fri • 12:00pm • Field 8
UC Davis	0
Florida	1
Fri • 12:00pm • Field 9
BYU	4
Colorado State	1

Quarterfinals; Nov. 30, 2018; Foley, AL
Fri • 4:00pm • Field 8
North Carolina	2
Michigan State	0
Fri • 4:00pm • Field 9
Wisconsin	1
Virginia Tech	4
Fri • 6:00pm • Field 8
Oregon	1
Ohio State (a.e.t.)	2
Fri • 6:00pm • Field 9
Florida	2
BYU	1

Semifinals; Jan. 26, 2019; Charlotte, NC
Sat • 9:00am • UNC-C
North Carolina	2
Virginia Tech	0
Sat • 10:30am • UNC-C
Ohio State	0
Florida	1

Finals; Jan. 26, 2019; Charlotte, NC
Sat • 5:00pm • UNC-C
North Carolina	0
Florida (a.e.t.)	1
Third Place
Virginia Tech	1
Ohio State	3

==== Men's consolation ====
Quarterfinals
Fri • 2:00pm • Field 13
San Jose State (a.e.t.)	2
Texas – Rio Grande	1
Fri • 2:00pm • Field 14
Delaware	3
Illinois	1
Fri • 2:00pm • Field 6
Arizona	2
Texas Tech	1
Fri • 2:00pm • Field 7
Cincinnati	2
Pittsburgh	1

Semifinals
Fri • 7:00pm • Field 13
San Jose State	1
Delaware	2
Fri • 7:00pm • Field 14
Arizona	1
Cincinnati	4

Final
CANCELLED
Delaware
Cincinnati

=== Women's championship ===
Sweet 16; Nov. 30, 2018; Foley, AL
Fri • 10:00am • Field 4
UC-Santa Barbara	1 (2)
Michigan State	1 (3)
Fri • 10:00am • Field 5
UC-Davis (a.e.t.)	2
North Carolina	1
Fri • 10:00am • Field 10
Colorado State	3
UConn	0
Fri • 10:00am • Field 11
Illinois	2
Gonzaga	1
Fri • 12:00pm • Field 4
Colorado (a.e.t.)	1
Fordham	0
Fri • 12:00pm • Field 5
Michigan	1
Clemson	2
Fri • 12:00pm • Field 10
Cal	0 (2)
Wisconsin	0 (3)
Fri • 12:00pm • Field 11
Texas	0 (2)
Ohio State	0 (3)

Quarterfinals; Nov. 30, 2018; Foley, AL
Fri • 4:00pm • Field 2
Michigan State	0
UC-Davis	3
Fri • 4:00pm • Field 3
Colorado State	0
Illinois	1
Fri • 6:00pm • Field 2
Colorado	2 (3)
Clemson	2 (4)
Fri • 6:00pm • Field 3
Wisconsin	0
Ohio State	1

Semifinals; Feb. 23, 2019; Nashville, TN
Sat • 11:30pm • Turf
UC-Davis (a.e.t.)	2
Illinois	1
Sat • 9:30pm • Turf
Clemson	1
Ohio State	4

Finals; Feb. 24, 2019; Nashville, TN
Sun • 7:30am • Grass
UC-Davis	0
Ohio State	2

==== Women's consolation ====
Quarterfinals
Fri • 2:00pm • Field 15
Virginia	1
WashU	0
Fri • 2:00pm • Field 16
Texas A&M	4
NC State	2
Fri • 2:00pm • Field 8
Northeastern	1
Kansas	2
Fri • 2:00pm • Field 9
Iowa State	4
TCNJ	2

Semifinals
Fri • 7:00pm • Field 15
Virginia	2
Texas A&M	0
Fri • 7:00pm • Field 16
Kansas	2
Iowa State	0

Final
CANCELLED
Virginia
Kansas

=== Men's open ===
Quarterfinals
Fri • 2:00pm • Field 4
Minnesota	2
Illinois "Blue"	0
Fri • 2:00pm • Field 5
UCLA	2
UConn	0
Fri • 2:00pm • Field 10
JMU	3
San Diego State	0
Fri • 2:00pm • Field 11
Miami (FL)	0
Utah Valley	4

Semifinals
Sat • 10:00am • Field 2
Minnesota	0
UCLA	1
Sat • 10:00am • Field 15
JMU	1
Utah Valley	2

Final
CANCELLED – Co-champions
UCLA
Utah Valley

=== Women's open ===
Quarterfinals; Nov. 30, 2018; Foley, AL
Fri • 6:00pm • Field 4
Grand Valley	0
UCLA	3
Fri • 6:00pm • Field 5
Oregon	1
USC	2
Fri • 6:00pm • Field 10
Boston College	1
San Diego State	2
Fri • 6:00pm • Field 11
Cincinnati	1
JMU	2

Semifinals; Dec. 1, 2018; Foley, AL
Sat • 10:00am • Field 13
UCLA	0
USC	2
Sat • 10:00am • Field 14
San Diego State	2
JMU	0

Finals; Feb. 23, 2019; Irvine, CA
Sat • 2:00pm • Grass field
USC	1
San Diego State	3
