= 2025 Atlético Bucaramanga season =

Atlético Bucaramanga
2025 season
- Manager: Leonel Álvarez
- Stadium: Estadio Américo Montanini
- Categoría Primera A Torneo Apertura: 9th
- Categoría Primera A Torneo Finalización: 4th Semi-finals
- Copa Colombia: Round of 16
- Superliga Colombiana: Runners-up
- Copa Libertadores: Group stage
- Copa Sudamericana: Knockout round play-offs
- Top goalscorer: League: Luciano Pons (18); All: Luciano Pons (24)

The 2025 season was the 76th in the history of Atlético Bucaramanga and their 10th consecutive season in Colombia's top flight. The club competed in the Categoría Primera A, the Copa Colombia, the Superliga Colombiana, and the Copa Libertadores.

== Transfers ==
=== In ===
Pos.	Player	Transferred from	Fee	Date	Source
GK	(Colombia) Aldair Quintana	(Colombia) Atlético Nacional	Free	1 January 2025	
MF	(Colombia) Jhon Vásquez	(Colombia) Independiente Medellín	Free	7 January 2025	
FW	(Colombia) Jean Carlos Blanco	(Ecuador) Aucas	Free	8 January 2025	
FW	(Colombia) Kevin Londoño	(Colombia) Independiente Santa Fe	Free	8 January 2025	
DF	(Colombia) Alejandro Moralez	(Colombia) Independiente Santa Fe	Loan	8 January 2025	
MF	(Argentina) Diego Chávez	(Colombia) Deportivo Pasto	Free	10 January 2025	
DF	(Colombia) José García	(Colombia) Internacional Palmira	Loan	12 January 2025	
DF	(Colombia) Alejandro Artunduaga	(Greece) Chania	Free	14 January 2025	
MF	(Colombia) Sherman Cárdenas	Unattached	Free	16 January 2025	
FW	(Argentina) Luciano Pons	Universidad de Chile	Free	24 January 2025	
FW	(Colombia) Andrés Ibargüen	Unattached	Free	12 March 2025	

=== Out ===
Pos.	Player	Transferred to	Fee	Date	Source
FW	(Colombia) Michael Rangel	(Colombia) Llaneros	Released	1 January 2025	
MF	(Colombia) Johan Bocanegra	(Bolivia) Nacional Potosí	Released	1 January 2025	
MF	(Colombia) Edgard Camargo	(Colombia) Boyacá Chicó	Released	1 January 2025	
DF	(Colombia) Kevin Cuesta	(Colombia) Independiente Santa Fe	Free	3 January 2025	
MF	(Colombia) Larry Vásquez	(Brazil) Amazonas	Undisclosed	22 February 2025	

== Competitions ==
=== Overview ===
Competition	First match	Last match	Starting round	Final position	Record							
Competition	First match	Last match	Starting round	Final position	Pld	W	D	L	GF	GA	GD	Win %
Liga DIMAYOR Torneo Apertura	24 January 2025	25 May 2025	Matchday 1	9th	20	8	5	7	24	20	+4	40.00
Liga DIMAYOR Torneo Finalización	12 July 2025	8 December 2025	Matchday 1	4th Semi-finals	26	13	7	6	35	22	+13	50.00
Copa Colombia	2 June 2025	3 September 2025	First stage	Round of 16	6	4	1	1	10	7	+3	66.67
Superliga Colombiana	29 January 2025	6 February 2025	Final	Runners-up	2	0	2	0	1	1	+0	0.00
Copa Libertadores	1 April 2025	29 May 2025	Group stage	Group stage	6	1	3	2	6	10	−4	16.67
Copa Sudamericana	17 July 2025	24 July 2025	Knockout round play-offs	Knockout round play-offs	2	1	0	1	1	1	+0	50.00
Total					62	27	18	17	77	61	+16	43.55

Last updated: 8 December 2025
Source: Competitions

=== Categoría Primera A ===
==== Torneo Apertura ====
Pos	Team	Pld	W	D	L	GF	GA	GD	Pts	Qualification
7	Once Caldas	20	10	3	7	26	22	+4	33	Advance to the semi-finals
8	Independiente Medellín	20	8	8	4	19	11	+8	32	Advance to the semi-finals
9	Atlético Bucaramanga	20	8	5	7	24	20	+4	29	
10	Alianza	20	8	5	7	23	21	+2	29	
11	Deportivo Pasto	20	8	5	7	20	20	0	29	

Source: Dimayor, Soccerway
Rules for classification: 1) Points, 2) Goal difference, 3) Goals for, 4) Away goals for, 5) Away goals against, 6) Yellow cards, 7) Red cards, 8) Drawing of lots.

==== Results by round ====
Round	1	2	3	4	5	6	7	8	9	10	11	12	13	14	15
Ground	A	H	A	A	H	A	H	A	H	A	H	A	H	H	A
Result	L	L	L	D	D	D	D	W	L	W	W	L	W	W	D
Position															

Updated to match(es) played on 27 April 2025. Source:
A = Away; H = Home; W = Win; D = Draw; L = Loss

==== Matches ====
24 January 2025 1	Boyacá Chicó	1–0	Atlético Bucaramanga	Tunja
19:20 UTC−5				Stadium: Estadio La Independencia; Attendance: 3,000; Referee: José Alexander Ortiz Novoa

2 February 2025 2	Atlético Bucaramanga	0–4	América de Cali	Bucaramanga
20:30 UTC−5	Pons (penalty missed) 90+2'		Gómez 23'; Vergara 57'; Jiménez 78' (o.g.); Micolta 85'	Stadium: Estadio Américo Montanini; Attendance: 9,000; Referee: Héctor Alexander Rivera González

9 February 2025 3	Once Caldas	2–1	Atlético Bucaramanga	Manizales
16:10 UTC−5				Stadium: Estadio Palogrande

14 February 2025 4	Deportivo Cali	0–0	Atlético Bucaramanga	Palmira
19:30 UTC−5				Stadium: Estadio Deportivo Cali; Attendance: 22,000; Referee: Bismarks Santiago

18 February 2025 5	Atlético Bucaramanga	0–0	Alianza	Bucaramanga
				Stadium: Estadio Américo Montanini

1 March 2025 7	Atlético Bucaramanga	1–1	Junior	Bucaramanga
				Stadium: Estadio Américo Montanini

7 March 2025 8	Águilas Doradas	0–1	Atlético Bucaramanga	Rionegro
19:30 UTC−5			Hernández 1' (o.g.)	Stadium: Estadio Alberto Grisales

14 March 2025 9	Atlético Bucaramanga	0–1	Deportivo Pereira	Bucaramanga
20:30 UTC−5				Stadium: Estadio Américo Montanini; Attendance: 5,000; Referee: Diego Ruíz

19 March 2025 6	Independiente Santa Fe	1–1	Atlético Bucaramanga	Bogotá
18:30 UTC−5				Stadium: Estadio El Campín; Attendance: 14,754; Referee: Mauricio Mercado

23 March 2025 10	Alianza	1–2	Atlético Bucaramanga	Valledupar
15:30 UTC−5				Stadium: Estadio Armando Maestre Pavajeau; Referee: Luis Didier Gracia Benitez

28 March 2025 11	Atlético Bucaramanga	2–0	Atlético Nacional	Bucaramanga
19:30 UTC−5				Stadium: Estadio Américo Montanini

5 April 2025 12	Deportes Tolima	2–1	Atlético Bucaramanga	Ibagué
20:30 UTC−5				Stadium: Estadio Manuel Murillo Toro

13 April 2025 13	Atlético Bucaramanga	4–0	Fortaleza CEIF	Bucaramanga
20:10 UTC−5	Pons 22'; Flores 47'; Castañeda 74' (pen.); Vásquez 90+3'			Stadium: Estadio Américo Montanini; Referee: Lizmair Suárez

17 April 2025 14	Atlético Bucaramanga	1–0	Envigado	Bucaramanga
16:00 UTC−5	Pons 23'			Stadium: Estadio Américo Montanini; Referee: Steven Camargo

20 April 2025 15	Unión Magdalena	1–1	Atlético Bucaramanga	Santa Marta
16:10 UTC−5	Sarmiento 90+10' (pen.)		Pons 90+13'	Stadium: Estadio Sierra Nevada

27 April 2025 16	Atlético Bucaramanga	0–2	Millonarios	Bucaramanga
20:30				Stadium: Estadio Américo Montanini

3 May 2025 17	Llaneros	2–1	Atlético Bucaramanga

10 May 2025 18	Atlético Bucaramanga	2–0	Independiente Medellín

17 May 2025 19	La Equidad	1–4	Atlético Bucaramanga

=== Superliga Colombiana ===
29 January 2025 First leg	Atlético Nacional	1–1	Atlético Bucaramanga	Medellín
19:30 UTC−5	Arce (yellow card) 58'; Asprilla 60'; Aguirre (yellow card) 67'; Cardona (yellow card) 88'		Fabry 4'; Ponce (yellow card) 30'; Zárate (yellow card) 45+2'; Hinestroza (yellow card) 45+1' (red card) 45+7'; Quintana (yellow card) 50'	Stadium: Estadio Atanasio Girardot; Attendance: 42,130; Referee: Diego Ruiz

6 February 2025 Second leg	Atlético Bucaramanga	0–0 (1–1 agg.) (3–4 p)	Atlético Nacional	Bucaramanga
19:30 UTC−5	Henao (yellow card) 9'; Gutierrez (red card) 21'; Jiménez (yellow card) 64'; Mena (yellow card) 68'; Sambueza (yellow card) 86'		Morelos (yellow card) 13'; Salazar (yellow card) 29'; Hinestroza (yellow card) 45+1'; Campuzano (yellow card) 57'; Viveros (yellow card) 90+1'	Stadium: Estadio Américo Montanini; Attendance: 25,000; Referee: Carlos Ortega
	Penalties
	Henao (penalty missed); Mena (penalty scored); Sambueza (penalty scored); Fabry (penalty scored); Castañeda (penalty missed)		(penalty scored) Cardona; (penalty scored) Tesillo; (penalty missed) Zapata; (penalty scored) Uribe; (penalty scored) Hinestroza

=== Copa Libertadores ===
==== Group stage ====
Pos	Team	Pld	W	D	L	GF	GA	GD	Pts	Qualification
1	(Argentina) Racing	6	4	1	1	14	3	+11	13	Advance to round of 16
2	(Brazil) Fortaleza	6	2	2	2	8	5	+3	8	Advance to round of 16
3	(Colombia) Atlético Bucaramanga	6	1	3	2	6	10	−4	6	Transfer to Copa Sudamericana
4	(Chile) Colo-Colo	6	1	2	3	5	15	−10	5	

Source: CONMEBOL
Rules for classification: 1) Points; 2) Goal difference; 3) Goals scored; 4) Away goals scored; 5) CONMEBOL ranking.

1 April 2025 1	Atlético Bucaramanga (Colombia)	3–3	(Chile) Colo-Colo	Bucaramanga
19:30 UTC−5	Londoño 9'; Pons 24'; Henao 57'	Report	Correa 38' (pen.), 84'; Isla 63'	Stadium: Estadio Américo Montanini; Attendance: 21,307; Referee: Carlos Paul Benítez (Paraguay)

10 April 2025 2	Racing Club (Argentina)	1–2	(Colombia) Atlético Bucaramanga	Avellaneda, Argentina
19:00 UTC−3	Barrios 90+2'	Report	Pons 54'; Sambueza 64'	Stadium: El Cilindro; Attendance: 0 (Note: Racing played their home match against Atlético Bucaramanga behind closed doors as they were punished for the use of pyrotechnics by their fans in their 2024 Copa Sudamericana semi-final match against Corinthians.); Referee: Andrés Matonte (Uruguay)

23 April 2025 3	Atlético Bucaramanga (Colombia)	1–1	(Brazil) Fortaleza	Bucaramanga
21:00 UTC−5	Pons 89' (pen.)	Report	Deyverson 19'	Stadium: Estadio Américo Montanini; Referee: Kevin Ortega (Peru)

6 May 2025 4	Atlético Bucaramanga (Colombia)	0–4	(Argentina) Racing Club	Bucaramanga
17:00		Report	Martínez 4'; Solari 56'; Sosa 69'; Barrios 90+4'	Stadium: Estadio Américo Montanini; Attendance: 21,496

13 May 2025 5	Fortaleza (Brazil)	0–0	(Colombia) Atlético Bucaramanga	Fortaleza, Brazil
		Report		Stadium: Castelão; Attendance: 40,279

29 May 2025 6	Colo-Colo (Chile)	1–0	(Colombia) Atlético Bucaramanga	Macul, Chile
	Correa 26'	Report		Stadium: Estadio Monumental David Arellano; Attendance: 0 (Note: Colo-Colo played their home matches against Racing and Atlético Bucaramanga behind closed doors as they were punished for the incidents in their match against Fortaleza.)

=== Copa Sudamericana ===
==== Knockout round play-offs ====
17 July 2025 First leg	Atlético Bucaramanga (Colombia)	0–1	(Brazil) Atlético Mineiro	Bucaramanga
19:30 UTC−5		Report	Hulk 68' (pen.)	Stadium: Estadio Américo Montanini; Referee: Alexis Herrera (Venezuela)

24 July 2025 Second leg	Atlético Mineiro (Brazil)	0–1 (1–1 agg.) (3–1 p)	(Colombia) Atlético Bucaramanga	Belo Horizonte, Brazil
21:30 UTC−5		Report	Mena 45'	Stadium: Arena MRV; Attendance: 22,653; Referee: Esteban Ostojich (Uruguay)
	Penalties
	Hulk (penalty scored); Gustavo Scarpa (penalty missed); Bernard (penalty missed); Gabriel Menino (penalty scored); Everson (penalty scored)		(penalty scored) Chávez; (penalty missed) Henao; (penalty missed) Mena; (penalty missed) Zárate
