= 2024 Atlético Bucaramanga season =

Atlético Bucaramanga
2024 season
- Manager: Rafael Dudamel
- Stadium: Estadio Américo Montanini
- Categoría Primera A – Apertura: Winners
- Categoría Primera A – Clausura: 10th
- Copa Colombia: Semi-finals
- Biggest win: Atlético Bucaramanga 6–2 Real Santander; Atlético Bucaramanga 4–0 La Equidad; Alianza 0–4 Atlético Bucaramanga
- Biggest defeat: Atlético Junior 2–0 Atlético Bucaramanga; Atlético Bucaramanga 0–2 Deportes Tolima

The 2024 season was the 75th in the history of Atlético Bucaramanga and their ninth consecutive season in the top division. The club won the Apertura, finished tenth in the Clausura, and was eliminated in the semi-finals of the domestic cup competition.

== Transfers ==
=== In ===
Pos.	Player	Transferred from	Fee	Date	Source
MF	(Colombia) Jean Colorado	(Colombia) Inter Palmira	Loan	1 January 2024	
FW	(Colombia) Ricardo Márquez	(Colombia) Unión Magdalena	Loan	1 January 2024	
GK	(Colombia) Luis Vásquez	(Colombia) Independiente Medellín	Loan	1 January 2024	
DF	(Colombia) Juan Mosquera	(Colombia) Inter Palmira Sub-20	Loan	1 January 2024	
GK	(Colombia) Aldair Quintana	(Colombia) Atlético Nacional	Loan	1 January 2024	
DF	(Colombia) Aldair Gutiérrez	(Colombia) Deportivo Cali	Free	1 January 2024	
DF	(Colombia) Carlos Romaña	(Colombia) Deportes Quindío	Free	1 January 2024	
DF	(Colombia) Fredy Hinestroza	(Colombia) Junior de Barranquilla	Free	1 January 2024	
MF	(Argentina) Fabián Sambueza	(Colombia) Independiente Santa Fe	Free	1 January 2024	
MF	(Venezuela) Leonardo Flores	(Venezuela) Caracas	Free	1 January 2024	
MF	(Colombia) Fabry	(Colombia) Deportivo Cali	Free	1 January 2024	
MF	(Colombia) Joider Micolta	(Colombia) América de Cali	Undisclosed	1 January 2024	
FW	(Colombia) Daniel Mosquera	(Colombia) América de Cali	Loan	1 January 2024	
DF	(Colombia) Kevin Cuesta	(Colombia) Independiente Santa Fe	Undisclosed	16 January 2024	
DF	(Uruguay) Robert Herrera	(Uruguay) Deportivo Maldonado	Free	17 January 2024	
MF	(Colombia) Estefano Arango	(Colombia) Deportes Tolima	Free	23 January 2024	
MF	(Colombia) Larry Vásquez	(Colombia) Millonarios	Free	1 July 2024	
FW	(Venezuela) Andrés Ponce	(Russia) Akron Tolyatti	Free	3 July 2024	
DF	(Colombia) Cristián Zapata	(Brazil) Vitória	Free	5 July 2024	
MF	(Colombia) Esneyder Mena	(Colombia) América de Cali	Loan	20 July 2024	
FW	(Venezuela) Adalberto Peñaranda	(Bosnia and Herzegovina) Sarajevo	Loan	24 July 2024	
FW	(Colombia) Michael Rangel	(Colombia) Alianza	Free	20 August 2024	

=== Out ===
Pos.	Player	Transferred from	Fee	Date	Source
DF	(Colombia) David Gómez	Retired		1 January 2024	
MF	(Colombia) John Pérez	(Venezuela) Ureña SC	Released	1 January 2024	
MF	(Colombia) Javier Reina	(Colombia) Deportivo Cali	Free	1 January 2024	
MF	(Colombia) Jáder Maza	(Colombia) Jaguares	Free	20 February 2024	
MF	(Colombia) Jhon Córdoba	(Guatemala) Malacateco	Loan return	30 June 2024	
FW	(Colombia) Misael Martínez	(Colombia) Alianza	Undisclosed	1 July 2024	
DF	(Uruguay) Robert Herrera		Released	1 July 2024	

== Friendlies ==
13 January 2024 Friendly	Deportivo Tachira (Venezuela)	0–1	(Colombia) Atlético Bucaramanga	San Cristóbal
17:00 UTC−4			Mosquera 64'	Stadium: Estadio Polideportivo de Pueblo Nuevo

== Competitions ==
=== Overall record ===
Competition	First match	Last match	Starting round	Final position	Record							
Competition	First match	Last match	Starting round	Final position	Pld	W	D	L	GF	GA	GD	Win %
Categoría Primera A Aperutra	21 January 2024	15 June 2024	Matchday 1	Winners	27	14	7	6	33	18	+15	51.85
Categoría Primera A Clausura	18 July 2024	14 November 2024	Matchday 1	10th	19	8	4	7	21	17	+4	42.11
Copa Colombia	7 March 2024	17 November 2024	First round	Semi-finals	12	6	6	0	24	10	+14	50.00
Total					58	28	17	13	78	45	+33	48.28

Source: Competitions

=== Categoría Primera A ===
==== Apertura ====
===== Results summary =====
Overall								Home						Away					
Pld	W	D	L	GF	GA	GD	Pts	W	D	L	GF	GA	GD	W	D	L	GF	GA	GD
19	11	5	3	24	10	+14	38	7	2	1	18	6	+12	4	3	2	6	4	+2

===== Results by round =====
Round	1	2	3	4	5	6	7	8	9	10	11	12	13	14	15	16	17	18	19
Ground	A	H	A	A	H	A	H	A	H	H	A	H	H	A	H	A	H	A	H
Result	L	D	W	W	D	D	W	D	W	W	D	W	W	W	W	L	L	W	W
Position	17	15	10	3	6	7	4	6	4	4	4	2	1	2	1	2	2	2	1

A = Away; H = Home; W = Win; D = Draw; L = Loss

===== Matches =====
21 January 2024 1	Atlético Junior	2–0	Atlético Bucaramanga

29 January 2024 2	Atlético Bucaramanga	0–0	Millonarios

2 February 2024 3	Jaguares	0–1	Atlético Bucaramanga

7 February 2024 4	Santa Fe	0–1	Atlético Bucaramanga

10 February 2024 5	Atlético Bucaramanga	1–1	Once Caldas

16 February 2024 6	América de Cali	0–0	Atlético Bucaramanga

19 February 2024 7	Atlético Bucaramanga	1–0	Deportivo Pasto

22 February 2024 8	Deportes Tolima	0–0	Atlético Bucaramanga

3 March 2024 10	Atlético Bucaramanga	3–0	Patriotas

10 March 2024 11	Atlético Nacional	0–0	Atlético Bucaramanga

16 March 2024 12	Atlético Bucaramanga	4–0	La Equidad

24 March 2024 13	Atlético Bucaramanga	3–1	Envigado

27 March 2024 9	Atlético Bucaramanga	1–0	Águilas Doradas

31 March 2024 14	Deportivo Pereira	1–2	Atlético Bucaramanga

7 April 2024 15	Atlético Bucaramanga	2–1	Deportivo Cali

14 April 2024 16	Independiente Medellín	1–0	Atlético Bucaramanga

19 April 2024 17	Atlético Bucaramanga	2–3	Boyacá Chicó

22 April 2024 18	Fortaleza	0–2	Atlético Bucaramanga

28 April 2024 19	Atlético Bucaramanga	1–0	Alianza

===== Play-offs =====
Group A

4 May 2024	Deportivo Pereira	1–0	Atlético Bucaramanga

11 May 2024	Atlético Bucaramanga	0–0	Atlético Junior

20 May 2024	Millonarios	0–1	Atlético Bucaramanga

23 May 2024	Atlético Bucaramanga	0–0	Millonarios

26 May 2024	Atlético Junior	1–0	Atlético Bucaramanga

2 June 2024	Atlético Bucaramanga	3–1	Deportivo Pereira

===== Finals =====
9 June 2024 First leg	Atlético Bucaramanga	1–0	Independiente Santa Fe	Bucaramanga
	Hinestroza 69'			Stadium: Estadio Américo Montanini; Attendance: 28,000; Referee: Wilmar Roldán

16 June 2024 Second leg	Independiente Santa Fe	3–2 (5–6 p)	Atlético Bucaramanga	Bogotá
				Stadium: Estadio El Campín; Attendance: 34,239; Referee: Carlos Betancourt
	Penalties
	Francisco Chaverra (penalty scored); Germán Agustín Rodríguez (penalty missed); Marcelo Ortiz (penalty scored); Elvis Perlaza (penalty scored); Hugo Rodallega (penalty scored); Juan Pablo Zuluaga (penalty scored); Julian Millan (penalty missed)		(penalty scored) Daniel Mosquera; (penalty scored) Carlos Henao; (penalty scored) Joider Micolta; (penalty missed) Leonardo Flores; (penalty scored) Jefferson Mena; (penalty scored) Aldair Zárate; (penalty scored) Edwin Fabri Castro

==== Clausura ====
===== Results summary =====
Overall								Home						Away					
Pld	W	D	L	GF	GA	GD	Pts	W	D	L	GF	GA	GD	W	D	L	GF	GA	GD
19	8	4	7	21	17	+4	28	3	2	4	7	9	−2	5	2	3	14	8	+6

===== Results by round =====
Round	1	2	3	4	5	6	7	8	9	10	11	12	13	14	15	16	17	18	19
Ground	H	A	H	H	A	H	A	H	A	A	H	A	A	H	A	H	A	H	A
Result	W	L	D	L	L	L	W	L	W	W	W	W	D	D	L	L	D	W	W
Position	6	12	12	15	17	18	15	16	14	10	9	8	10	9	10	12	12	11	10

A = Away; H = Home; W = Win; D = Draw; L = Loss

===== Matches =====
18 July 2024 1	Atlético Bucaramanga	1–0	Atlético Junior

21 July 2024 2	Millonarios	1–0	Atlético Bucaramanga

28 July 2024 3	Atlético Bucaramanga	0–0	Jaguares

8 August 2024 4	Atlético Bucaramanga	0–1	Santa Fe

11 August 2024 5	Once Caldas	2–1	Atlético Bucaramanga

18 August 2024 6	Atlético Bucaramanga	1–2	América de Cali

24 August 2024 7	Deportivo Pasto	1–2	Atlético Bucaramanga

1 September 2024 8	Atlético Bucaramanga	0–2	Deportes Tolima

13 September 2024 10	Patriotas	1–2	Atlético Bucaramanga

24 September 2024 11	Atlético Bucaramanga	1–0	Atlético Nacional

28 September 2024 12	La Equidad	0–1	Atlético Bucaramanga

5 October 2024 13	Envigado	0–0	Atlético Bucaramanga

13 October 2024 14	Atlético Bucaramanga	1–1	Deportivo Pereira

21 October 2024 9	Águilas Doradas	1–3	Atlético Bucaramanga

27 October 2024 15	Deportivo Cali	1–0	Atlético Bucaramanga

4 November 2024 16	Atlético Bucaramanga	2–3	Independiente Medellín

6 November 2024 17	Boyacá Chicó	1–1	Atlético Bucaramanga

10 November 2024 18	Atlético Bucaramanga	1–0	Fortaleza

14 November 2024 19	Alianza	0–4	Atlético Bucaramanga

=== Copa Colombia ===
==== First round ====
7 March 2024 First leg	Atlético Bucaramanga	6–2	Real Santander

20 March 2024 Second leg	Real Santander	3–4 (5–10 agg.)	Atlético Bucaramanga

==== Second round ====
10 April 2024 First leg	Atlético Bucaramanga	3–0	Patriotas

25 April 2024 Second leg	Patriotas	0–3 (0–6 agg.)	Atlético Bucaramanga

==== Third round ====
15 May 2024 First leg	Independiente Santa Fe	1–1	Atlético Bucaramanga

28 August 2024 Second leg	Atlético Bucaramanga	3–1 (4–2 agg.)	Independiente Santa Fe

==== Round of 16 ====
1 October 2024 First leg	Millonarios	0–0	Atlético Bucaramanga	Bogotá
				Stadium: Estadio El Campín; Referee: Mauricio Mercado

8 October 2024 Second leg	Atlético Bucaramanga	1–1 (1–1 agg.) (4–2 p)	Millonarios	Bucaramanga
	Ponce 26'		Mosquera 51'	Stadium: Estadio Américo Montanini

==== Quarter-finals ====
17 October 2024 First leg	Deportivo Pasto	1–2	Atlético Bucaramanga	Pasto
				Stadium: Estadio Departamental Libertad; Referee: David Espinosa

24 October 2024 Second leg	Atlético Bucaramanga	0–0 (2–1 agg.)	Deportivo Pasto	Bucaramanga
				Stadium: Estadio Américo Montanini; Referee: Ferney Trujillo

==== Semi-finals ====
30 October 2024 First leg	Atlético Bucaramanga	1–1	América de Cali	Bucaramanga
	Hinestroza (yellow card) 43'; Jiménez (yellow card) 60'; Fabry 77', (yellow card) 82'; Castañeda (yellow card) 90+4'		Soto (yellow card) 31'; Zapata 40', (yellow card) 84'; Castrillón (yellow card) 75'; Barrios (yellow card) 86'; Palacios (yellow card) 90+4'	Stadium: Estadio Américo Montanini; Referee: Andrés Rojas

17 November 2024 Second leg	América de Cali	0–0 (1–1 agg.) (5–4 p)	Atlético Bucaramanga	Cali
	Bocanegra (yellow card) 28'; Rivera (yellow card) 77'; Medina (yellow card) 90+2'; Balanta (yellow card) 90+2'		Cuesta (yellow card) 7'; Mena (yellow card) 51'	Stadium: Estadio Olimpico Pascual Guerrero; Referee: Luis Matorel
	Penalties
	Vergara (penalty scored); Zapata (penalty missed); Bocanegra (penalty scored); Barrios (penalty scored); Ramos (penalty scored); Soto (penalty scored)		(penalty scored) Castañeda; (penalty scored) Fabry; (penalty missed) Vásquez; (penalty scored) Rangel; (penalty scored) Sambueza; (penalty scored) Mena
