= 2024 Copa Colombia =

Copa BetPlay Dimayor 2024
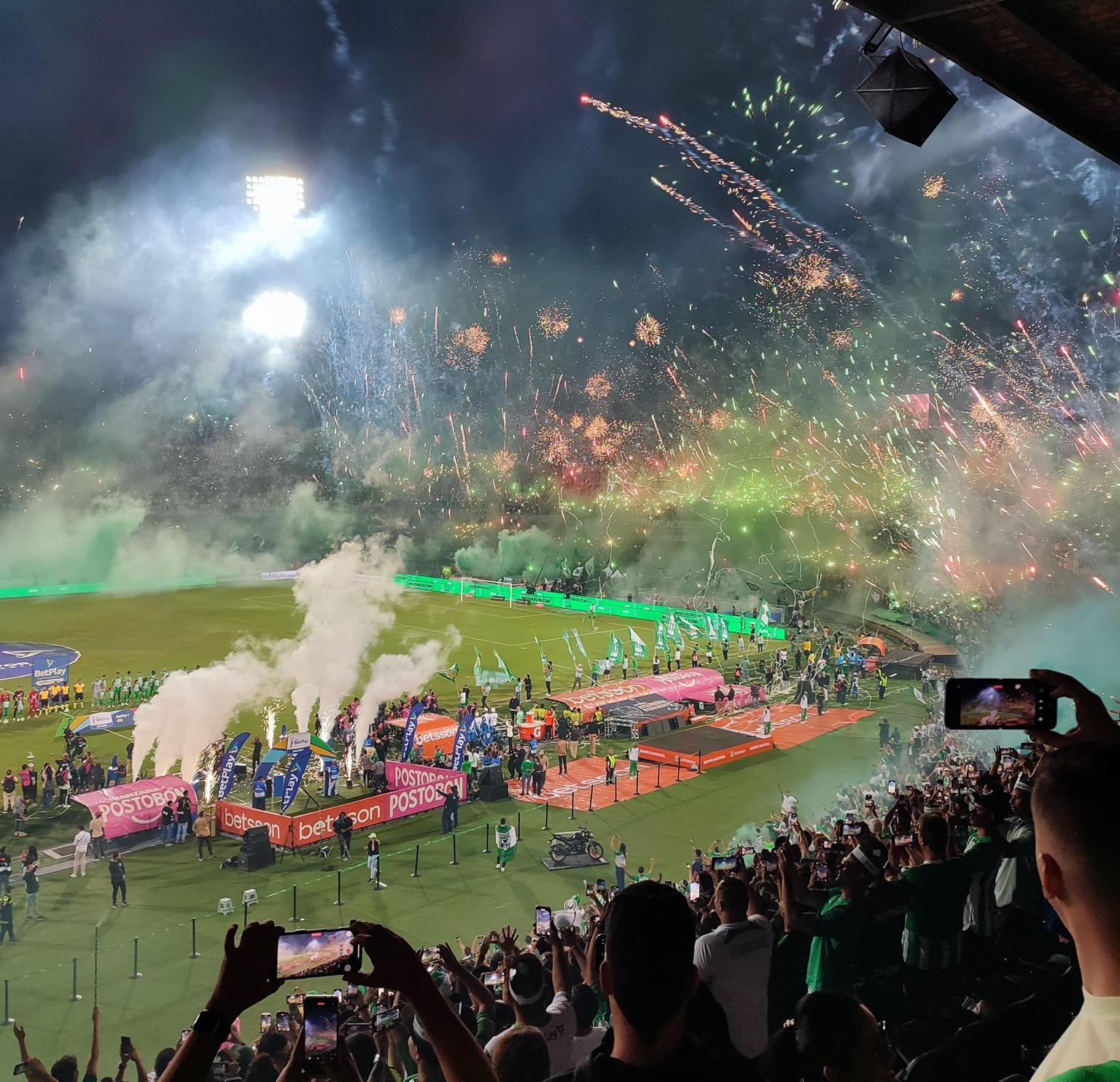
- Estadio Atanasio Girardot prior to the first leg of the final between Atlético Nacional and America de Cali.

Tournament details
- Country: Colombia
- Dates: 5 March – 15 December 2024
- Teams: 36

Final positions
- Champions: Atlético Nacional (7th title)
- Runners-up: América de Cali

Tournament statistics
- Matches played: 70
- Goals scored: 174 (2.49 per match)
- Top goal scorer: Carlos Lucumí (5 goals)

The 2024 Copa Colombia, officially the Copa BetPlay Dimayor 2024 for sponsorship reasons, was the 22nd edition of the Copa Colombia, the national cup competition for clubs affiliated to DIMAYOR, the governing body of professional club football in Colombia. The tournament, which was contested by 36 teams, began on 5 March and ended on 15 December 2024.

The defending champions Atlético Nacional won their seventh Copa Colombia title, defeating América de Cali in the finals. By winning the competition, Atlético Nacional were entitled to qualify for the 2025 Copa Sudamericana, however, since they won the 2024 Finalización tournament a few days later, their berth was redistributed through the league's aggregate table.

== Format ==
The competition kept the format used in the previous edition. In its first stage, the eight lowest placed teams in the aggregate table of the 2023 Primera A played against the eight lowest placed teams in the aggregate table of the 2023 Primera B, being drawn in eight ties. The eight first stage winners then faced the remaining Primera B teams in the second round of the competition, with the eight winners advancing to the third stage where they were drawn against each other. The round of 16 was played with the four winners from the previous stage and the remaining 12 Primera A teams which entered the competition at that point. The winners then advanced to the subsequent knockout stages of the competition (quarter-finals, semi-finals, and finals). The order of legs was drawn for each phase of the competition.

== Schedule ==
The schedule of the competition was as follows:

Round	Draw date	First leg	Second leg
First stage	23 January 2024	5–7 March 2024	19–21 March 2024
Second stage	22 March 2024	8–10 April 2024	23–25 April 2024
Third stage	28 April 2024	8–15 May 2024	15 May – 29 August 2024
Round of 16	30 August 2024	11 September – 1 October 2024	19 September – 8 October 2024
Quarter-finals	3 October 2024	17–22 October 2024	23–25 October 2024
Semi-finals	3 October 2024	30–31 October 2024	17 November 2024
Finals	3 October 2024	12 December 2024	15 December 2024

== First stage ==
The first stage was played by eight Categoría Primera A and eight Categoría Primera B clubs.

Team 1	Agg.	Team 2	1st leg	2nd leg
Atlético Bucaramanga	10–5	Real Santander	6–2	4–3
Deportivo Pereira	2–0	Real Cundinamarca	2–0	0–0
Bogotá	1–6	Once Caldas	0–2	1–4
Envigado	2–0	Orsomarso	1–0	1–0
Santa Fe	4–2	Boca Juniors de Cali	3–1	1–1
Atlético	2–4	Jaguares	1–2	1–2
Barranquilla	2–4	Atlético Huila	1–3	1–1
Tigres	3–3 (4–2 p)	Unión Magdalena	2–1	1–2

=== First leg ===
5 March 2024	Envigado	1–0	Orsomarso	Envigado
16:00 UTC−5	Moreno 53'	Report		Stadium: Polideportivo Sur; Referee: Ancízar Jiménez

6 March 2024	Atlético	1–2	Jaguares	Cali
15:30 UTC−5	Barbosa 48'	Report	Arboleda 13'; Neira 90'	Stadium: Pascual Guerrero; Referee: Ricardo Pabón

6 March 2024	Bogotá	0–2	Once Caldas	Bogotá
18:00 UTC−5		Report	G. Torres 41' (pen.); Cubides 81'	Stadium: Metropolitano de Techo; Referee: Alejandro Moncada

6 March 2024	Santa Fe	3–1	Boca Juniors de Cali	Bogotá
20:00 UTC−5	Correa 33'; F. Chaverra 53'; Zuluaga 63'	Report	J. Chaverra 17'	Stadium: El Campín; Referee: Liz Mair Suárez

7 March 2024	Tigres	2–1	Unión Magdalena	Bogotá
15:30 UTC−5	Palacio 1'; Salazar 61'	Report	Carreño 90' (pen.)	Stadium: Metropolitano de Techo; Referee: Luis Picón

7 March 2024	Barranquilla	1–3	Atlético Huila	Barranquilla
16:00 UTC−5	Carabalí 90+7' (pen.)	Report	Lucumí 4', 32' (pen.); Medina 19'	Stadium: Romelio Martínez; Referee: Didier Gracia

7 March 2024	Atlético Bucaramanga	6–2	Real Santander	Bucaramanga
18:00 UTC−5	Arango 39', 55'; Valencia 45+4'; Martínez 53'; Márquez 67'; J. Rodríguez 87'	Report	P. Rodríguez 3'; Delgado 42' (o.g.)	Stadium: Alfonso López; Referee: Yahir Cárdenas

7 March 2024	Deportivo Pereira	2–0	Real Cundinamarca	Pereira
20:00 UTC−5	Cabrera 39'; Abonía 45+3' (o.g.)	Report		Stadium: Hernán Ramírez Villegas; Referee: Carlos Márquez

=== Second leg ===
19 March 2024	Jaguares	2–1 (4–2 agg.)	Atlético	Montería
18:10 UTC−5	Maza 9'; Medrano 27'	Report	Reales 59'	Stadium: Jaraguay; Referee: Wilmar Montaño

20 March 2024	Real Santander	3–4 (5–10 agg.)	Atlético Bucaramanga	Piedecuesta
16:00 UTC−5	Mendoza 47'; Yanes 74'; Garcés 79'	Report	Orejuela 45+1' (o.g.); Zárate 54'; Colorado 61'; Martínez 70'	Stadium: Villa Concha; Referee: Mauricio Mercado

20 March 2024	Orsomarso	0–1 (0–2 agg.)	Envigado	Palmira
16:15 UTC−5		Report	Noreña 41'	Stadium: Francisco Rivera Escobar; Referee: Álvaro Meléndez

20 March 2024	Real Cundinamarca	0–0 (0–2 agg.)	Deportivo Pereira	Bogotá
18:00 UTC−5		Report		Stadium: Parque Olaya Herrera; Referee: Camilo Colmenares

20 March 2024	Boca Juniors de Cali	1–1 (2–4 agg.)	Santa Fe	Cali
20:00 UTC−5	Aponzá 80'	Report	Correa 35'	Stadium: Pascual Guerrero; Referee: Jonathan Ortiz

21 March 2024	Unión Magdalena	2–1 (3–3 agg.) (2–4 p)	Tigres	Santa Marta
15:30 UTC−5	Carreño 19'; Vanegas 45+3'	Report	Cárdenas 28'	Stadium: Sierra Nevada; Referee: Ricardo Pabón
	Penalties
	Carreño (penalty scored); Mera (penalty missed); Giraldo (penalty scored); Castro (penalty missed)		(penalty scored) Lara; (penalty scored) Barrios; (penalty scored) Tamayo; (penalty scored) Mahecha

21 March 2024	Atlético Huila	1–1 (4–2 agg.)	Barranquilla	Neiva
16:00 UTC−5	Lucumí 27' (pen.)	Report	Bacca 14' (pen.)	Stadium: Guillermo Plazas Alcid; Referee: Ferney Trujillo

21 March 2024	Once Caldas	4–1 (6–1 agg.)	Bogotá	Manizales
20:00 UTC−5	Araújo 14'; Rojas 51'; Murillo 56'; Cubides 76'	Report	Vergara 40' (pen.)	Stadium: Palogrande; Referee: Yahir Cárdenas

== Second stage ==
In the second stage, the eight first stage winners were drawn against the top eight clubs of the 2023 Primera B aggregate table.

Team 1	Agg.	Team 2	1st leg	2nd leg
Atlético Huila	3–3 (3–4 p)	Real Cartagena	2–0	1–3
Fortaleza	3–1	Once Caldas	2–1	1–0
Atlético Bucaramanga	6–0	Patriotas	3–0	3–0
Deportivo Pereira	2–2 (4–3 p)	Leones	1–1	1–1
Envigado	6–4	Deportes Quindío	3–2	3–2
Llaneros	3–3 (3–4 p)	Jaguares	2–2	1–1
Internacional	2–3	Santa Fe	2–2	0–1
Cúcuta Deportivo	0–1	Tigres	0–0	0–1

=== First leg ===
8 April 2024	Internacional	2–2	Santa Fe	Palmira
16:00 UTC−5	Acha 23'; Martínez 45+4'	Report	González 51'; Moreno 78'	Stadium: Francisco Rivera Escobar; Referee: Yahir Cárdenas

9 April 2024	Cúcuta Deportivo	0–0	Tigres	Cúcuta
16:00 UTC−5		Report		Stadium: General Santander; Referee: Mauricio Mercado

9 April 2024	Fortaleza	2–1	Once Caldas	Bogotá
18:00 UTC−5	Arrieta 69'; Rodríguez 88'	Report	Beltrán 43'	Stadium: Metropolitano de Techo; Referee: Liz Mair Suárez

9 April 2024	Deportivo Pereira	1–1	Leones	Pereira
20:00 UTC−5	Suárez 38'	Report	Martínez 90+3'	Stadium: Hernán Ramírez Villegas; Referee: Álvaro Meléndez

10 April 2024	Llaneros	2–2	Jaguares	Yopal
15:45 UTC−5	Lasso 25'; Ospina 45+3'	Report	Díaz 14'; Osorio 40'	Stadium: Santiago de las Atalayas; Referee: David Espinosa

10 April 2024	Atlético Huila	2–0	Real Cartagena	Neiva
16:00 UTC−5	Lucumí 56', 59'	Report		Stadium: Guillermo Plazas Alcid; Referee: Wilmar Montaño

10 April 2024	Envigado	3–2	Deportes Quindío	Envigado
16:00 UTC−5	Zapata 15'; A. Palacios 55'; Paternina 69'	Report	Castillo 63'; J. Palacios 64'	Stadium: Polideportivo Sur; Referee: Jonathan Ortiz

10 April 2024	Atlético Bucaramanga	3–0	Patriotas	Bucaramanga
19:40 UTC−5	Córdoba 10'; Martínez 14', 74'	Report		Stadium: Alfonso López; Referee: Ferney Trujillo

=== Second leg ===
23 April 2024	Tigres	1–0 (1–0 agg.)	Cúcuta Deportivo	Bogotá
19:40 UTC−5	Aragón 90+3'	Report		Stadium: Metropolitano de Techo; Referee: Héctor Rivera

24 April 2024	Real Cartagena	3–1 (3–3 agg.) (4–3 p)	Atlético Huila	Cartagena
15:30 UTC−5	Palomeque 16'; López 18'; Gutiérrez 71'	Report	Farías 52'	Stadium: Jaime Morón León; Referee: Luis Picón

24 April 2024	Jaguares	1–1 (3–3 agg.) (4–3 p)	Llaneros	Montería
16:00 UTC−5	Contreras 71'	Report	Lasso 29'	Stadium: Jaraguay; Referee: Alejandro Moncada
	Penalties
	Maza (penalty scored); Escorcia (penalty missed); González (penalty scored); Villalobos (penalty scored); Contreras (penalty missed); Guerrero (penalty scored)		(penalty scored) Ospina; (penalty missed) Quejada; (penalty scored) Lasso; (penalty missed) Ordóñez; (penalty scored) Urueña; (penalty missed) Ayala

24 April 2024	Leones	1–1 (2–2 agg.) (3–4 p)	Deportivo Pereira	Itagüí
19:00 UTC−5	Valencia 51'	Report	Álvarez 84'	Stadium: Metropolitano Ciudad de Itagüí; Referee: Mauricio Mercado
	Penalties
	Arango (penalty missed); Ruiz (penalty missed); Rodríguez (penalty scored); Maya (penalty scored); Martínez (penalty scored)		(penalty scored) Cabrera; (penalty scored) Piedrahita; (penalty missed) Ed. Moreno; (penalty scored) Pérez; (penalty scored) Álvarez

24 April 2024	Santa Fe	1–0 (3–2 agg.)	Internacional	Bogotá
19:30 UTC−5	Moreno 29'	Report		Stadium: El Campín; Referee: Ferney Trujillo

25 April 2024	Patriotas	0–3 (0–6 agg.)	Atlético Bucaramanga	Tunja
17:30 UTC−5		Report	Valencia 13'; Mosquera 33', 61'	Stadium: La Independencia; Referee: Wander Mosquera

25 April 2024	Deportes Quindío	2–3 (4–6 agg.)	Envigado	Armenia
19:00 UTC−5	F. Valencia 34'; Castillo 72' (pen.)	Report	Paternina 47'; Moreno 49', 81'	Stadium: Centenario; Referee: Wilmar Montaño

25 April 2024	Once Caldas	0–1 (1–3 agg.)	Fortaleza	Manizales
20:00 UTC−5		Report	Navarro 65'	Stadium: Palogrande; Referee: Luis Matorel

== Third stage ==
Team 1	Agg.	Team 2	1st leg	2nd leg
Santa Fe	2–4	Atlético Bucaramanga	1–1	1–3
Envigado	3–2	Real Cartagena	2–0	1–2
Tigres	5–6	Jaguares	5–3	0–3
Deportivo Pereira	0–2	Fortaleza	0–1	0–1

=== First leg ===
8 May 2024	Envigado	2–0	Real Cartagena	Envigado
16:00 UTC−5	Noreña 21'; Hurtado 61'	Report		Stadium: Polideportivo Sur; Referee: Diego Ulloa

8 May 2024	Deportivo Pereira	0–1	Fortaleza	Pereira
19:30 UTC−5		Report	Bazán 74' (o.g.)	Stadium: Hernán Ramírez Villegas; Referee: Wander Mosquera

9 May 2024	Tigres	5–3	Jaguares	Bogotá
19:10 UTC−5	Lucumí 15'; Salazar 26'; Palacio 43'; Aragón 65', 90'	Report	Rojas 6'; Mosquera 64', 80'	Stadium: Metropolitano de Techo; Referee: Ferney Trujillo

15 May 2024	Santa Fe	1–1	Atlético Bucaramanga	Bogotá
18:00 UTC−5	Scarpeta 15'	Report	Mosquera 85'	Stadium: El Campín; Referee: Liz Mair Suárez

=== Second leg ===
15 May 2024	Fortaleza	1–0 (2–0 agg.)	Deportivo Pereira	Bogotá
20:05 UTC−5	Parra 34'	Report		Stadium: Metropolitano de Techo; Referee: Alexander Ortiz

16 May 2024	Jaguares	3–0 (6–5 agg.)	Tigres	Sincelejo
15:00 UTC−5	Serje 35'; Pino 51'; Lenis 69'	Report		Stadium: Arturo Cumplido Sierra; Referee: Diego Ulloa

28 August 2024	Atlético Bucaramanga	3–1 (4–2 agg.)	Santa Fe	Bucaramanga
18:15 UTC−5	Hinestroza 21'; Sambueza 38'; Ponce 67'	Report	López 90+5'	Stadium: Américo Montanini; Referee: Luis Delgado
Note: Match originally scheduled for 29 May 2024, 19:30 local time but postponed to 28 August 2024.

29 August 2024	Real Cartagena	2–1 (2–3 agg.)	Envigado	Cartagena
20:00 UTC−5	Murillo 32'; Salcedo 73'	Report	Cuesta 45+3'	Stadium: Jaime Morón León; Referee: Wilmar Montaño
Note: Match originally scheduled for 16 May 2024, 19:30 local time but postponed to 29 August 2024 due to issues with the lighting system at Estadio Jaime Morón León.

== Final stages ==
Each round in the final stages is played under a home-and-away two-legged format. The teams entering the competition at this stage are the top 12 teams in the aggregate table of the 2023 Primera A season. The order of legs of each tie is decided by draw. In case of a draw on aggregate score at the end of the second leg, extra time will not be played and the winner will be decided in a penalty shoot-out.

=== Bracket ===
Round of 16
Envigado	0	0	0
Jaguares	0	1	1
Alianza	1	1	2
Atlético Nacional	1	2	3
Boyacá Chicó (p)	2	0	2 (3)
Águilas Doradas	1	1	2 (1)
Junior	0	2	2 (3)
Independiente Medellín (p)	2	0	2 (4)
Deportes Tolima	1	1	2
Deportivo Pasto	2	1	3
Millonarios	0	1	1 (2)
Atlético Bucaramanga (p)	0	1	1 (4)
América de Cali	2	0	2
La Equidad	0	0	0
Fortaleza	1	2	3 (1)
Deportivo Cali (p)	0	3	3 (4)

Quarter-finals
Jaguares	1	1	2
Atlético Nacional	3	2	5
Boyacá Chicó	3	0	3 (0)
Independiente Medellín (p)	0	3	3 (3)
Deportivo Pasto	1	0	1
Atlético Bucaramanga	2	0	2
América de Cali	2	0	2
Deportivo Cali	0	0	0

Semi-finals
Atlético Nacional	2	0	2
Independiente Medellín	0	1	1
Atlético Bucaramanga	1	0	1 (4)
América de Cali (p)	1	0	1 (5)

Finals
Atlético Nacional	3	3	6
América de Cali	1	0	1

=== Round of 16 ===
Team 1	Agg.	Team 2	1st leg	2nd leg
América de Cali	2–0	La Equidad	2–0	0–0
Fortaleza	3–3 (1–4 p)	Deportivo Cali	1–0	2–3
Deportes Tolima	2–3	Deportivo Pasto	1–2	1–1
Millonarios	1–1 (2–4 p)	Atlético Bucaramanga	0–0	1–1
Independiente Medellín	2–2 (4–3 p)	Junior	2–0	0–2
Boyacá Chicó	2–2 (3–1 p)	Águilas Doradas	2–1	0–1
Alianza	2–3	Atlético Nacional	1–1	1–2
Envigado	0–1	Jaguares	0–0	0–1

==== First leg ====
11 September 2024	Independiente Medellín	2–0	Junior	Itagüí
18:00 UTC−5	Sandoval 49'; Perlaza 55'	Report		Stadium: Metropolitano Ciudad de Itagüí; Referee: Carlos Betancur

16 September 2024	Alianza	1–1	Atlético Nacional	Valledupar
18:30 UTC−5	Camargo 83' (pen.)	Report	Morelos 35'	Stadium: Armando Maestre Pavajeau; Referee: Luis Matorel

17 September 2024	Envigado	0–0	Jaguares	Envigado
16:00 UTC−5		Report		Stadium: Polideportivo Sur; Referee: Jairo Mayorga

17 September 2024	Deportes Tolima	1–2	Deportivo Pasto	Ibagué
19:00 UTC−5	Gil 18'	Report	Moreno 13'; Londoño 25'	Stadium: Manuel Murillo Toro; Referee: José Ortiz

17 September 2024	Fortaleza	1–0	Deportivo Cali	Bogotá
20:00 UTC−5	Ramírez 84'	Report		Stadium: Metropolitano de Techo; Referee: Carlos Márquez

18 September 2024	Boyacá Chicó	2–1	Águilas Doradas	Tunja
19:00 UTC−5	Uzcátegui 12'; Baquero 88'	Report	Ramos 74'	Stadium: La Independencia; Referee: Wilmar Montaño

25 September 2024	América de Cali	2–0	La Equidad	Cali
18:30 UTC−5	Álvarez Balanta 18'; Quiñónes 26'	Report		Stadium: Pascual Guerrero; Referee: Lizmair Suárez

1 October 2024	Millonarios	0–0	Atlético Bucaramanga	Bogotá
20:00 UTC−5		Report		Stadium: El Campín; Referee: Mauricio Mercado
Note: Match originally scheduled for 19 September 2024, 20:30 local time at Estadio Metropolitano de Techo, Bogotá but postponed to 1 October due to logistical issues.

==== Second leg ====
19 September 2024	Atlético Nacional	2–1 (3–2 agg.)	Alianza	Medellín
19:30 UTC−5	Román 34'; Tesillo 77'	Report	Muñoz 39'	Stadium: Atanasio Girardot; Referee: Carlos Betancur

24 September 2024	Deportivo Cali	3–2 (3–3 agg.) (4–1 p)	Fortaleza	Palmira
19:00 UTC−5	Colmán 6'; Bustamante 29'; Estupiñán 90+6'	Report	Murillo 47'; Díaz 62'	Stadium: Deportivo Cali; Referee: David Espinosa
	Penalties
	Montero (penalty scored); Rea (penalty scored); Andrade (penalty scored); Estupiñán (penalty scored)		(penalty missed) Díaz; (penalty scored) Rodríguez; (penalty missed) Murillo

2 October 2024	La Equidad	0–0 (0–2 agg.)	América de Cali	Bogotá
18:00 UTC−5		Report		Stadium: El Campín; Referee: David Espinosa

2 October 2024	Jaguares	1–0 (1–0 agg.)	Envigado	Montería
18:00 UTC−5	Padilla 47'	Report		Stadium: Jaraguay; Referee: Ferney Trujillo

2 October 2024	Águilas Doradas	1–0 (2–2 agg.) (1–3 p)	Boyacá Chicó	Sincelejo
18:30 UTC−5	Quiñónes 35' (pen.)	Report		Stadium: Arturo Cumplido Sierra; Referee: Lizmair Suárez
	Penalties
	Quiñónes (penalty missed); Pineda (penalty missed); Estacio (penalty scored); Oliveros (penalty missed)		(penalty scored) Lozano; (penalty scored) Támara; (penalty missed) Pimentel; (penalty scored) Sánchez

2 October 2024	Deportivo Pasto	1–1 (3–2 agg.)	Deportes Tolima	Pasto
19:30 UTC−5	Castilla 4'	Report	Esparragoza 30'	Stadium: Departamental Libertad; Referee: Carlos Márquez

2 October 2024	Junior	2–0 (2–2 agg.) (3–4 p)	Independiente Medellín	Barranquilla
20:00 UTC−5	Rodríguez 34' (pen.); Castrillón 48'	Report		Stadium: Metropolitano Roberto Meléndez; Referee: Héctor Rivera
	Penalties
	Bacca (penalty scored); Herrera (penalty missed); Zalazar (penalty scored); Pérez (penalty scored); Berrío (penalty missed)		(penalty scored) L. Chaverra; (penalty missed) F. Chaverra; (penalty scored) Martínez; (penalty scored) Aja; (penalty scored) Torijano

8 October 2024	Atlético Bucaramanga	1–1 (1–1 agg.) (4–2 p)	Millonarios	Bucaramanga
20:00 UTC−5	Ponce 26'	Report	Mosquera 51'	Stadium: Américo Montanini; Referee: Nolberto Ararat
	Penalties
	Rangel (penalty scored); Hinestroza (penalty missed); Zárate (penalty scored); Zapata (penalty scored); Sambueza (penalty scored)		(penalty missed) Arias; (penalty scored) L. Castro; (penalty scored) Banguero; (penalty missed) Ramírez

=== Quarter-finals ===
Team 1	Agg.	Team 2	1st leg	2nd leg
América de Cali	2–0	Deportivo Cali	2–0	0–0
Deportivo Pasto	1–2	Atlético Bucaramanga	1–2	0–0
Boyacá Chicó	3–3 (0–3 p)	Independiente Medellín	3–0	0–3
Jaguares	2–5	Atlético Nacional	1–3	1–2

Notes

1. Dimayor awarded a 3–0 win in favour of Boyacá Chicó after the match was postponed due to Independiente Medellín failing to reach Tunja in time to play the match. The original result was a 4–1 win for Independiente Medellín.

==== First leg ====
17 October 2024	América de Cali	2–0	Deportivo Cali	Cali
18:40 UTC−5	Vergara 18', 72' (pen.)	Report		Stadium: Pascual Guerrero; Referee: Nicolás Gallo

17 October 2024	Deportivo Pasto	1–2	Atlético Bucaramanga	Pasto
20:40 UTC−5	Alba 54'	Report	Castro 60'; Carabalí 90+1' (o.g.)	Stadium: Departamental Libertad; Referee: David Espinosa

19 October 2024	Jaguares	1–3	Atlético Nacional	Montería
17:00 UTC−5	Lenis 25'	Report	Morelos 20', 24'; Asprilla 79'	Stadium: Jaraguay; Referee: Steven Camargo

22 October 2024	Boyacá Chicó	3–0; Awarded	Independiente Medellín	Tunja
20:10 UTC−5	Gómez 15' (pen.)	Report	García 3'; L. Chaverra 30'; León 63'; Torijano 77'	Stadium: La Independencia; Referee: Juan Pablo Alba
Note: Match originally scheduled for 21 October 2024, 19:00 local time but postponed to 22 October 2024 due to road blockades that prevented Independiente Medellín from reaching Tunja in time to play the match. Although Independiente Medellín won the match 4–1, Dimayor accepted a complaint from Boyacá Chicó on the postponement of the match and declared Independiente Medellín as losers by forfeit.

==== Second leg ====
23 October 2024	Deportivo Cali	0–0 (0–2 agg.)	América de Cali	Palmira
19:00 UTC−5		Report		Stadium: Deportivo Cali; Referee: Carlos Betancur

24 October 2024	Atlético Bucaramanga	0–0 (2–1 agg.)	Deportivo Pasto	Bucaramanga
18:30 UTC−5		Report		Stadium: Américo Montanini; Referee: Ferney Trujillo

24 October 2024	Atlético Nacional	2–1 (5–2 agg.)	Jaguares	Medellín
20:30 UTC−5	Viveros 15'; Cardona 88'	Report	Ceter 28'	Stadium: Atanasio Girardot; Referee: Wilmar Montaño

25 October 2024	Independiente Medellín	3–0 (3–3 agg.) (3–0 p)	Boyacá Chicó	Medellín
20:30 UTC−5	Perlaza 78'; L. Chaverra 87' (pen.); Sandoval 90+4'	Report		Stadium: Atanasio Girardot; Referee: Steven Camargo
	Penalties
	L. Chaverra (penalty scored); Martínez (penalty missed); Sandoval (penalty scored); Fory (penalty scored)		(penalty missed) Lozano; (penalty missed) Pimentel; (penalty missed) Plazas

=== Semi-finals ===
Team 1	Agg.	Team 2	1st leg	2nd leg
Atlético Nacional	2–1	Independiente Medellín	2–0	0–1
Atlético Bucaramanga	1–1 (4–5 p)	América de Cali	1–1	0–0

==== First leg ====
30 October 2024	Atlético Bucaramanga	1–1	América de Cali	Bucaramanga
20:00 UTC−5	Castro 77'	Report	Zapata 40'	Stadium: Américo Montanini; Referee: Andrés Rojas

31 October 2024	Atlético Nacional	2–0	Independiente Medellín	Medellín
20:00 UTC−5	Sarmiento 37'; Ceppelini 90+3' (pen.)	Report		Stadium: Atanasio Girardot; Referee: Wilmar Roldán

==== Second leg ====
17 November 2024	América de Cali	0–0 (1–1 agg.) (5–4 p)	Atlético Bucaramanga	Cali
17:15 UTC−5		Report		Stadium: Pascual Guerrero; Referee: Luis Matorel
	Penalties
	Vergara (penalty scored); Zapata (penalty missed); Bocanegra (penalty scored); Barrios (penalty scored); Ramos (penalty scored); Soto (penalty scored)		(penalty scored) Castañeda; (penalty scored) Castro; (penalty missed) L. Vásquez; (penalty scored) Rangel; (penalty scored) Sambueza; (penalty missed) Mena

17 November 2024	Independiente Medellín	1–0 (1–2 agg.)	Atlético Nacional	Medellín
19:30 UTC−5	García 90'	Report		Stadium: Atanasio Girardot; Referee: José Ortiz

=== Finals ===
12 December 2024
19:30 UTC−5

Atlético Nacional	3–1	América de Cali
Román 30'; Hinestroza 49'; Morelos 72'	Report	Vergara 6'

Estadio Atanasio Girardot, Medellín
Referee: Bismarks Santiago

15 December 2024
17:00 UTC−5

América de Cali	0–3 Awarded	Atlético Nacional
	Report

Estadio Pascual Guerrero, Cali
Referee: José Ortiz

The second leg match was abandoned at the 84th minute of play due to incidents by América de Cali fans. On 24 December 2024, Dimayor awarded Atlético Nacional a 3–0 win by forfeit. The score at the time of suspension was 0–0.

Atlético Nacional won 6–1 on aggregate.

Copa BetPlay Dimayor
2024 champions

7th title

== See also ==
- 2024 Categoría Primera A season
- 2024 Categoría Primera B season
