= 2025 Superliga Colombiana =

Atlético Nacional	Atlético Bucaramanga
1	1
- on aggregate Atlético Nacional won 4–3 on penalties

First leg
Atlético Nacional	Atlético Bucaramanga
1	1
- Date: 29 January 2025
- Venue: Estadio Atanasio Girardot, Medellín
- Referee: Diego Ruiz

Second leg
Atlético Bucaramanga	Atlético Nacional
0	0
- Date: 6 February 2025
- Venue: Estadio Américo Montanini, Bucaramanga
- Referee: Carlos Ortega

The 2025 Superliga Colombiana (officially known as the Superliga BetPlay Dimayor 2025 for sponsorship purposes) was the fourteenth edition of the Superliga Colombiana, Colombia's football super cup tournament organized by DIMAYOR. It was contested by Atlético Bucaramanga and Atlético Nacional, champions of the 2024 Categoría Primera A season tournaments, from 29 January to 6 February 2025.

Atlético Nacional won their fourth title in the competition, defeating Atlético Bucaramanga on penalty kicks after a 1–1 draw on aggregate.

== Teams ==
The 2025 Superliga Colombiana was played by Atlético Bucaramanga, champions of the 2024 Apertura tournament, and Atlético Nacional, champions of the 2024 Finalización tournament. This was Atlético Bucaramanga's first appearance in the competition, having won the Primera A tournament for the first time in the previous season, whilst this was the seventh time Atlético Nacional played the Superliga, winning the competition in 2012, 2016 and 2023.

Team	Qualification	Previous appearances (bold indicates winners)
Atlético Bucaramanga	2024 Apertura champions	None
Atlético Nacional	2024 Finalización champions	6 (**2012**, 2014, 2015, **2016**, 2018, **2023**)

== Matches ==
=== First leg ===
29 January 2025
19:30 UTC−5

Atlético Nacional	1–1	Atlético Bucaramanga
Asprilla 60'	Report	F. Castro 4'

Estadio Atanasio Girardot, Medellín
Attendance: 42,130
Referee: Diego Ruiz

**Atlético Nacional**	**Atlético Bucaramanga**

GK	1	(Colombia) David Ospina (c)		(substituted off) 21'
RB	20	(Colombia) Joan Castro		(substituted off) 46'
CB	28	(Colombia) Juan Felipe Aguirre	(yellow card) 67'
CB	16	(Colombia) William Tesillo
LB	17	(Colombia) Andrés Salazar		(substituted off) 71'
RCM	8	(Colombia) Mateus Uribe		(substituted off) 46'
LCM	21	(Colombia) Jorman Campuzano	(yellow card) 68'
AM	10	(Colombia) Edwin Cardona	(yellow card) 88'
RW	27	(Colombia) Dairon Asprilla
LW	29	(Colombia) Andrés Sarmiento		(substituted off) 46'
CF	19	(Colombia) Kevin Viveros
Substitutes:
GK	15	(Colombia) Harlen Castillo		(substituted on) 21'
DF	6	(Colombia) Andrés Román		(substituted on) 46'
DF	13	(Uruguay) Camilo Cándido		(substituted on) 71'
MF	32	(Colombia) Sebastián Guzmán
MF	80	(Colombia) Juan Zapata		(substituted on) 46'
FW	7	(Colombia) Faber Gil
FW	11	(Ecuador) Billy Arce	(yellow card) 58'	(substituted on) 46'
Manager:
(Argentina) Javier Gandolfi

GK	1	(Colombia) Aldair Quintana	(yellow card) 50'
RB	19	(Colombia) Aldair Gutiérrez
CB	23	(Colombia) Carlos Romaña
CB	2	(Colombia) Jefferson Mena (c)
CB	29	(Colombia) Carlos Henao
LB	8	(Colombia) Fredy Hinestroza	(yellow card) 45+1' (yellow-red card) 45+7'
RM	20	(Colombia) Aldair Zárate	(yellow card) 45+2'	(substituted off) 72'
CM	22	(Colombia) Fabry Castro
LM	28	(Venezuela) Leonardo Flores		(substituted off) 80'
CF	10	(Argentina) Fabián Sambueza		(substituted off) 80'
CF	9	(Venezuela) Andrés Ponce	(yellow card) 30'	(substituted off) 54'
Substitutes:
GK	12	(Colombia) Luis Vásquez
DF	21	(Colombia) Alejandro Moralez
MF	5	(Colombia) Larry Vásquez		(substituted on) 80'
MF	7	(Colombia) Kevin Londoño		(substituted on) 54'
FW	11	(Colombia) Jhon Vásquez		(substituted on) 80'
FW	18	(Colombia) Jean Carlos Blanco
FW	70	(Colombia) Frank Castañeda		(substituted on) 72'
Manager:
(Paraguay) Gustavo Florentín

Assistant referees:
John Aguilar
Yair Padilla
Fourth official:
Mauricio Mercado
Video assistant referee:
Luis Trujillo
Assistant video assistant referee:
Juan Pablo Alba

**Match rules**

- 90 minutes.
- Seven named substitutes.
- Maximum of five substitutions.

Statistics
	Atl. Nacional	Atl. Bucaramanga
Goals scored	1	1
Total shots	28	5
Shots on target	10	3
Ball possession	74.3%	25.7%
Corner kicks	12	0
Fouls committed	10	12
Offsides	0	3
Yellow cards	4	4
Red cards	0	1

=== Second leg ===
6 February 2025
19:30 UTC−5

Atlético Bucaramanga	0–0	Atlético Nacional
	Report
Penalties
Henao (penalty missed); Mena (penalty scored); Sambueza (penalty scored); Castro (penalty scored); Castañeda (penalty missed)	3–4	(penalty scored) Cardona; (penalty scored) Tesillo; (penalty missed) J. Zapata; (penalty scored) Uribe; (penalty scored) Hinestroza

Estadio Américo Montanini, Bucaramanga
Referee: Carlos Ortega

**Atlético Bucaramanga**	**Atlético Nacional**

GK	1	(Colombia) Aldair Quintana
RB	19	(Colombia) Aldair Gutiérrez	(red card) 21'
CB	23	(Colombia) Carlos Romaña
CB	2	(Colombia) Jefferson Mena (c)	(yellow card) 68'
CB	29	(Colombia) Carlos Henao	(yellow card) 9'
LB	6	(Colombia) Santiago Jiménez	(yellow card) 64'
RM	20	(Colombia) Aldair Zárate		(substituted off) 90+5'
CM	22	(Colombia) Fabry Castro
LM	28	(Venezuela) Leonardo Flores		(substituted off) 79'
CF	10	(Argentina) Fabián Sambueza	(yellow card) 86'
CF	27	(Argentina) Luciano Pons		(substituted off) 71'
Substitutes:
GK	12	(Colombia) Luis Vásquez
DF	25	(Colombia) Cristián Zapata		(substituted on) 90+5'
MF	5	(Colombia) Larry Vásquez
MF	15	(Argentina) Diego Chávez
FW	9	(Venezuela) Andrés Ponce		(substituted on) 71'
FW	11	(Colombia) Jhon Vásquez
FW	70	(Colombia) Frank Castañeda		(substituted on) 79'
Manager:
(Paraguay) Gustavo Florentín

GK	15	(Colombia) Harlen Castillo
RB	6	(Colombia) Andrés Román
CB	28	(Colombia) Juan Felipe Aguirre
CB	16	(Colombia) William Tesillo
LB	17	(Colombia) Andrés Salazar	(yellow card) 29'	(substituted off) 58'
RCM	80	(Colombia) Juan Zapata
LCM	21	(Colombia) Jorman Campuzano	(yellow card) 57'	(substituted off) 70'
AM	10	(Colombia) Edwin Cardona (c)
RW	27	(Colombia) Dairon Asprilla		(substituted off) 58'
LW	18	(Colombia) Marino Hinestroza	(yellow card) 45+1'
CF	9	(Colombia) Alfredo Morelos	(yellow card) 13'	(substituted off) 70'
Substitutes:
GK	25	(Colombia) Luis Marquínez
DF	13	(Uruguay) Camilo Cándido		(substituted on) 58'
DF	33	(Colombia) Royer Caicedo
MF	8	(Colombia) Mateus Uribe		(substituted on) 70'
MF	32	(Colombia) Sebastián Guzmán
FW	11	(Ecuador) Billy Arce		(substituted on) 58'
FW	19	(Colombia) Kevin Viveros	(yellow card) 90+1'	(substituted on) 70'
Manager:
(Argentina) Javier Gandolfi

Assistant referees:
David Fuentes
Jorge Sanna
Fourth official:
Luis Delgado
Video assistant referee:
Heider Castro
Assistant video assistant referee:
Lisandro Castillo

**Match rules**

- 90 minutes.
- Penalty shoot-out if tied on aggregate.
- Seven named substitutes.
- Maximum of five substitutions.

Statistics
	Atl. Bucaramanga	Atl. Nacional
Goals scored	0	0
Total shots	4	17
Shots on target	3	3
Ball possession	34.2%	65.8%
Corner kicks	3	4
Fouls committed	12	7
Offsides	3	2
Yellow cards	4	5
Red cards	0	1

Tied 1–1 on aggregate, Atlético Nacional won on penalties.

Superliga Colombiana
2025 champions

**4th title**
