= Royer Caicedo =

Colombian footballer (born 2006)

Personal information
- Full name: Royer Alejandro Caicedo González
- Date of birth: 5 May 2006 (age 20)
- Place of birth: Guachené, Colombia
- Height: 1.95 m (6 ft 5 in) (Note: Sources differ. El Colombiano gave Caicedo's height as 1.92 m at the time of his debut in February 2025; sources from 2026 give 1.95 m.)
- Position: Centre-back

Team information
- Current team: Cercle Brugge
- Number: 33

Senior career*
Years	Team	Apps	(Gls)
2025–2026	Atlético Nacional	6	(0)
2026–	Cercle Brugge	4	(0)
- * Club domestic league appearances and goals as of 19 September 2026

Royer Alejandro Caicedo González (born 5 May 2006) is a Colombian footballer who plays as a centre-back for Belgian Pro League club Cercle Brugge.

Caicedo joined Atlético Nacional from a youth academy in Popayán in January 2024 and made his Categoría Primera A debut a year later. After eight competitive appearances he was sold to Cercle Brugge in February 2026, becoming the first Colombian to play for the Belgian club.

He received his first call-up to the Colombia senior squad in September 2026.

== Early life ==
Caicedo was born in Guachené, a small municipality in the department of Cauca that has also produced the Colombia internationals Yerry Mina and Davinson Sánchez.

He was playing under-17 football for the Academia Alemana de Fútbol in Popayán when the coach Camilo Pérez recommended him to Atlético Nacional. Caicedo moved alone to Medellín in January 2024 and lived in the club's youth residence while adapting to the professional game.

== Club career ==
=== Atlético Nacional ===
Caicedo made his Categoría Primera A debut on 2 February 2025, starting in a 1–0 win over La Equidad at the Estadio El Campín in Bogotá in front of more than 30,000 spectators. He completed ten defensive actions, won 71 per cent of his duels and was not dribbled past. Manager Javier Gandolfi said afterwards that he had harboured doubts about selecting him but that Caicedo had not disappointed, adding that left-footed centre-backs of his stature are difficult to find.

He made eight competitive appearances for Nacional in total — six in the league and two in cup competition — accumulating more than 600 minutes. He was in the squad as the club won the 2024 Copa Colombia and the 2024 Liga BetPlay finalización, and again for the 2025 Superliga Colombiana, won on penalties against Atlético Bucaramanga four days after his debut.

=== Cercle Brugge ===
On 2 February 2026, Cercle Brugge presented Caicedo as a signing on a contract to June 2029 with an option for a further year. Nacional received a reported US$1.9 million for 75 per cent of his economic rights, retaining a share of any future sale. He became the first Colombian to play for the club.

He made his debut in the Belgian Pro League on 19 April 2026, in a 4–1 away win over Dender.

== International career ==
On 17 September 2026, Caicedo was named in a Colombia squad for the first time, for a series of friendlies in the United States. Head coach Néstor Lorenzo pointed to the scarcity of left-footed centre-backs of his height, and Colombian media presented the selection as part of a generational renewal behind Davinson Sánchez and Jhon Lucumí.

== Style of play ==
Caicedo's left-footed ability, height and physical strength have been the most consistently noted features of his game, alongside composure in possession and an ability to play out from the back. Cercle Brugge's technical director, Luciano Murchio, described him on signing as a defender combining physical qualities with technical ability.

== Honours ==
Atlético Nacional

- Copa Colombia: 2024
- Categoría Primera A: 2024 Finalización
- Superliga Colombiana: 2025
