= Oyié Flavié =

Cameroonian footballer (born 1973)

Oyié Guy Flavié (born 17 May 1973) is a Cameroonian former professional footballer who played as a forward.

== Early life ==
Flavié was born in 1973 in Yaoundé, Cameroon, debuting for Cameroonian side Diamant Yaounde at the age of seventeen, before playing for Canon Yaounde and Kadji Sports Academy.

== Club career ==
During his club career, Flavié became the first African player to play for Colombian sides Santa Fe and Patriotas. He started his Colombian career with Colombian side Junior, before signing for Colombian side Atlético Bucaramanga, where he played in the 1998 Copa Libertadores and was regarded to have played decently, receiving interest from Santa Fe. Eventually, he became a naturalized Colombian citizen. He is regarded as the most prominent and most remembered African player to play in Colombia, having played in the county for eleven years.

== International career ==
Flavié played and captained two games for the Cameroon national team during the 1990s, which enabled him to receive interest from more clubs.

== Post-playing career ==
After retiring from professional football, Flavié worked as a physical education teacher in Colombia.

== Personal life ==
Flavié has been married to a Colombian and has children.
