= Jesús Barrios (footballer, born 1961) =

Colombian footballer and manager (born 1961)

Personal information
- Full name: Jesús Alberto Barrios Álvarez
- Date of birth: 10 January 1961 (age 65)
- Place of birth: La Paz, Cesar, Colombia
- Position: Forward

Senior career*
Years	Team	Apps	(Gls)
1980–1989	Junior		
1990–1996	Bucaramanga		
1996–1998	Envigado		
Total		516	(111)

International career
1983–1986	Colombia		

Managerial career
- –: Valledupar
- 2007–2008: Envigado
- 2010: Bucaramanga
- * Club domestic league appearances and goals

Jesús Alberto Barrios Álvarez (born 10 January 1961) is a former Colombian football forward.

== Career ==
Born in La Paz, Cesar, Barrios played club football for Junior de Barranquilla, Atlético Bucaramanga and Envigado. He won the 1980 Colombian league title with Junior.

Barrios made several appearances for the Colombia national football team from 1983 to 1985, and he played at the Copa América 1983.

After he retired from playing, Barrios became a football coach. He managed Valledupar, Envigado and Bucaramanga. He was also an assistant manager at Deportivo Pereira.
