= Carlos Hoyos =

Colombian footballer (born 1962)

Personal information
- Full name: Carlos Mario Hoyos Jaramillo
- Date of birth: February 28, 1962 (age 64)
- Place of birth: Medellín, Colombia
- Height: 1.77 m (5 ft 9 1/2 in)
- Position: Defender

Senior career*
Years	Team	Apps	(Gls)
1985–1988	Deportivo Cali	272	(14)
1988–1991	Atlético Junior	23	(0)
1991–1992	Deportes Quindío	24	(0)
Total		319	(14)

International career
1985–1990	Colombia	24	(0)

Managerial career
- 1996–1997: Atlético Bucaramanga
- 2004: Cúcuta Deportivo
- 2009: Itagüí
- 2010–2011: Patriotas
- 2011: Itagüí
- 2011: Atlético Bucaramanga
- 2023: Jaguares
- * Club domestic league appearances and goals

Carlos Mario Hoyos Jaramillo (born February 28, 1962) is a football manager and retired football defender who was capped 24 times for Colombia between 1985 and 1990. He was an unused substitute for the 1990 World Cup. His club at that time was Atlético Junior.

== Career ==
Hoyos played professional football in Colombia with Deportivo Cali, Atlético Junior and Deportes Quindío. After he retired from playing, he became a football manager and led Itagüi FC, Patriotas Boyacá, Atlético Bucaramanga and Jaguares de Córdoba.
