= Juan Zapata (footballer, born 2000) =

Colombian footballer (born 2000)

Personal information
- Full name: Juan Manuel Zapata Zumaque
- Date of birth: 19 May 2000 (age 26)
- Place of birth: Chigorodó, Colombia
- Height: 1.79 m (5 ft 10 in)
- Position: Centre midfielder

Team information
- Current team: Atlético Nacional
- Number: 80

Youth career
- 2011–2019: Envigado

Senior career*
Years	Team	Apps	(Gls)
2019–2025	Envigado	98	(8)
2023–2024	→ Atlas (loan)	23	(4)
2024–2025	→ Atlético Nacional (loan)	37	(2)
2025–	Atlético Nacional	8	(2)
- * Club domestic league appearances and goals as of 11 December 2025

Juan Manuel Zapata Zumaque (born 19 May 2000) is a Colombian professional footballer who plays as a centre-midfielder for Atlético Nacional.

== Club career ==
Zapata started his youth career with Envigado at 11 years old and debuted for the first team in 2019. In July 2023, Zapata was loaned to Liga MX club Atlas. On 6 June 2024, Zapata returned to Colombia, being loaned to Categoría Primera A club Atlético Nacional.

== Career statistics ==
As of 21 February 2025

Club	Season	League			Cup		Continental		Other		Total	
Club	Season	Division	Apps	Goals	Apps	Goals	Apps	Goals	Apps	Goals	Apps	Goals
Envigado	2019	Categoría Primera A	0	0	2	0	—		—		2	0
Envigado	2020	Categoría Primera A	13	1	3	1	—		—		16	2
Envigado	2021	Categoría Primera A	26	1	0	0	—		—		26	1
Envigado	2022	Categoría Primera A	41	4	1	0	—		—		42	4
Envigado	2023	Categoría Primera A	18	2	2	0	—		—		20	2
Envigado	Total		98	8	8	1	0	0	0	0	106	9
Atlas	2023–24	Liga MX	23	4	—		—		3 (Note: Appearance(s) in Leagues Cup)	0	26	4
Atlético Nacional	2024	Categoría Primera A	20	1	6	0	—		—		26	1
Atlético Nacional	2025	Categoría Primera A	3	1	2	0	—		—		5	1
Atlético Nacional	Total		23	1	8	0	0	0	0	0	31	2
Career total			144	13	16	1	0	0	3	0	163	15

== Honours ==
Atlético Nacional

- Categoría Primera A: 2024 Finalización
- Copa Colombia: 2024
- Superliga Colombiana: 2025
