= Jhon Vásquez =

Colombian footballer (born 1995)

Personal information
- Full name: Jhon Freduar Vásquez Anaya
- Date of birth: 12 February 1995 (age 31)
- Place of birth: Cartagena, Colombia
- Height: 1.76 m (5 ft 9 in)
- Position: Right winger

Team information
- Current team: Atlético Bucaramanga
- Number: 11

Youth career
- Atlético Junior

Senior career*
Years	Team	Apps	(Gls)
2013	Atlético Junior	8	(1)
2014–2015	Barranquilla	50	(5)
2015–2016	Atlético Junior	6	(0)
2016	Alianza Petrolera	19	(3)
2017	Real Cartagena	5	(1)
2018	Cúcuta Deportivo	2	(0)
2019	Alianza Petrolera	44	(14)
2020–2024	Deportivo Cali	139	(18)
2022	→ Ceará (loan)	13	(0)
2024	Independiente Medellin	32	(4)
2024	→ Goiás (loan)	15	(1)
2025–	Atlético Bucaramanga	30	(2)
- * Club domestic league appearances and goals as of 11 December 2025

Jhon Freduar Vásquez Anaya (born 12 February 1995) is a Colombian footballer who plays for Atlético Bucaramanga.

== Career ==
At the age of 15, Vásquez joined the youth academy of Colombian top flight side Atlético Junior.

For the 2017 season, he signed for Real Cartagena in the Colombian second division.

For the 2019 season, he signed for Colombian top flight club Alianza Petrolera.

== Honours ==
=== Club ===
Junior

- Copa Colombia (1): 2015

Deportivo Cali

- Categoría Primera A (1): 2021-II
