= Nilson Castrillón =

Colombian footballer (born 1996)

Personal information
- Full name: Nilson David Castrillón Burbano
- Date of birth: 28 January 1996 (age 30)
- Place of birth: Caloto, Colombia
- Height: 1.83 m (6 ft 0 in)
- Position: Right back

Team information
- Current team: Atlético Bucaramanga
- Number: 6

Youth career
- Deportivo Cali U20: –2014

Senior career*
Years	Team	Apps	(Gls)
2015–2018	Deportivo Cali	15	(0)
2015	→ La Equidad (loan)	1	(0)
2017	→ Cortuluá (loan)	2	(0)
2018–2022	Deportes Tolima	31	(1)
2022–2023	Atlético Junior	40	(0)
2024	América de Cali	19	(1)
2025	Amazonas	22	(1)
2026	Novorizontino	15	(0)
2026–	Atlético Bucaramanga	1	(0)
- * Club domestic league appearances and goals as of 16 April 2026

Nilson David Castrillón Burbano (born 28 January 1996) is a Colombian footballer who plays as a defender for Atlético Bucaramanga.

== Honours ==
=== Club ===
Deportivo Cali

- Superliga Colombiana (1): 2014

Deportes Tolima

- Categoría Primera A (2): 2018-I, 2021-I

Atlético Junior

- Categoría Primera A (1): 2023-II

=== Local tournaments ===
Title	Club	Year
Championship Postobon Sub-19	Deportivo Cali	2012
