= Jader Quiñónes =

Colombian footballer

Personal information
- Full name: Jader Andrés Quiñónes Caicedo
- Date of birth: 12 December 2000 (age 25)
- Place of birth: Florida, Colombia
- Height: 1.70 m (5 ft 7 in)
- Position: Central midfielder

Team information
- Current team: Deportes Tolima
- Number: 42

Youth career
- Deportes Quindío

Senior career*
Years	Team	Apps	(Gls)
2018–2022	Deportes Quindío	52	(0)
2018	→ Universitario Popayán (loan)	20	(1)
2022	Águilas Doradas	17	(0)
2022–2023	Emirates Club	0	(0)
2023–2024	América de Cali	55	(3)
2025–	Deportes Tolima	5	(0)

International career^{‡}
2023–	Colombia	1	(0)
- * Club domestic league appearances and goals as of 16 May 2025 ‡ National team caps and goals as of 16 December 2023

Jader Andrés Quiñónes Caicedo (born 12 December 2000) is a Colombian football player who plays as a central midfielder for Deportes Tolima and the Colombia national team.

== International career ==
Quiñónes made his debut for the senior Colombia national team on 16 December 2023 in a friendly against Mexico.
