= Alexis Zapata =

Colombian footballer (born 1995)

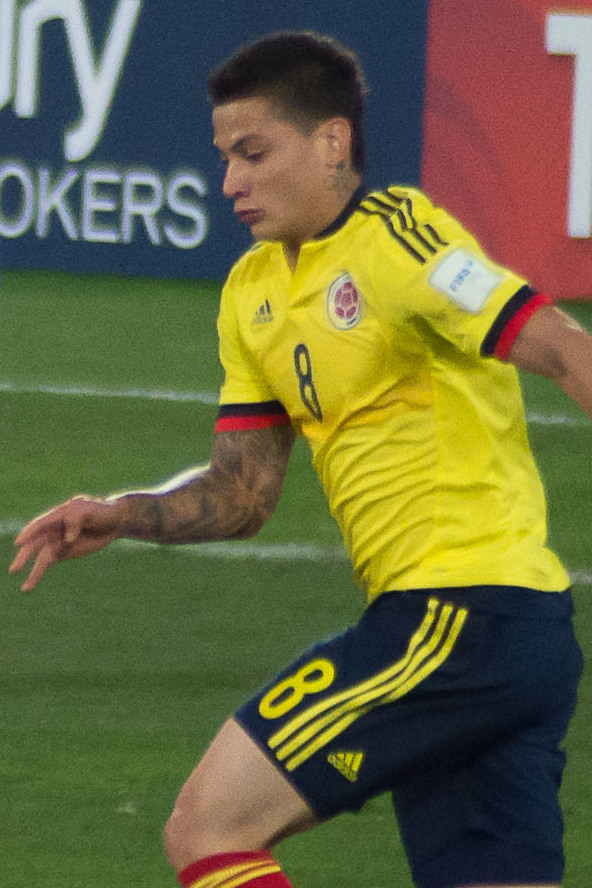
- Zapata in 2015

Personal information
- Full name: Alexis Zapata Álvarez
- Date of birth: 10 May 1995 (age 31)
- Place of birth: Medellín, Colombia
- Height: 1.76 m (5 ft 9 in)
- Position: Midfielder

Team information
- Current team: Independiente Santa Fe
- Number: 10

Youth career
- 2011–2012: Envigado

Senior career*
| Years | Team | Apps | (Gls) |
| 2013–2019 | Envigado | 59 | (14) |
| 2014 | → Udinese (loan) | 1 | (0) |
| 2014–2015 | → Sassuolo (loan) | 1 | (0) |
| 2015–2016 | → Perugia (loan) | 27 | (3) |
| 2017 | → Millonarios (loan) | 8 | (0) |
| 2020–2023 | Emelec | 71 | (13) |
| 2024–2025 | America de Cali | 28 | (1) |
| 2025- | Independiente Santa Fe | 35 | (4) |

International career
| 2014–2015 | Colombia U20 | 13 | (1) |
- * Club domestic league appearances and goals as of 11 December 2025

Alexis Zapata (born 10 May 1995) is a Colombian professional footballer who plays as a midfielder for Independiente Santa Fe.

== Club career ==
After scoring three goals with Colombian club Envigado in the 2014 Torneo di Viareggio, Udinese recruited him. On 31 January 2014, Zapata completed his loan move to Sassuolo until the end of the season.
