= Aldair Quintana =

Colombian footballer (born 1994)

Personal information
- Full name: Aldair Alejandro Quintana Rojas
- Date of birth: 11 July 1994 (age 32)
- Place of birth: Ibagué, Colombia
- Height: 1.95 m (6 ft 5 in)
- Position: Goalkeeper

Team information
- Current team: Independiente del Valle

Youth career
- Academia Tolimense de Fútbol
- River Plate

Senior career*
Years	Team	Apps	(Gls)
2014–2016	Independiente Medellín	0	(0)
2015	→ Depor (loan)	20	(0)
2016	Orsomarso S.C.	8	(0)
2017	Deportes Tolima	0	(0)
2018–2019	Atlético Huila	18	(0)
2019–2024	Atlético Nacional	58	(0)
2023	→ Deportivo Pereira (loan)	34	(0)
2024	→ Atlético Bucaramanga (loan)	42	(0)
2025–2026	Atlético Bucaramanga	44	(0)
2026–	Independiente del Valle	26	(0)

International career^{‡}
2026–	Colombia	1	(0)
Medal record
Representing Colombia
Copa América
Third place	2021 Brazil
- * Club domestic league appearances and goals as of 13 September 2026 ‡ National team caps and goals as of 2 October 2026

Aldair Alejandro Quintana Rojas (born 11 July 1994) is a Colombian professional footballer who plays as a goalkeeper for LigaPro Serie A club Independiente del Valle and the Colombia national team.

Quintana spent part of his youth career in the academy of River Plate in Argentina before starting his senior career in the Colombian second division on loan from Independiente Medellín. He broke into the top flight with Atlético Huila and joined Atlético Nacional in 2019, becoming their first-choice goalkeeper in 2021 and winning that year's Copa Colombia, before losing his place in 2022. On loan at Deportivo Pereira in 2023, he played in the club's run to the quarter-finals of the Copa Libertadores in its first appearance in the competition. At Atlético Bucaramanga he saved two penalties in the shoot-out that decided the 2024 Apertura final against Santa Fe, giving the club its first league title, and he later won a DIMAYOR award for the most clean sheets of the 2025 season. He joined Independiente del Valle in March 2026, winning the Supercopa Ecuador and reaching the Copa Libertadores quarter-finals in his first months at the club.

He was part of the Colombia squad that finished third at the 2021 Copa América, but had not made a senior international appearance by the time of his recall in September 2026.

== Early life and youth career ==
Quintana was born on 11 July 1994 in Ibagué, the capital of Tolima. His father, René Quintana, had a brief career as a centre-back in Tolima, and his mother is Francy Rojas; Quintana has said he saw himself as a goalkeeper for as long as he could remember. He trained at the Academia Tolimense de Fútbol in Ibagué, the academy that had also developed James Rodríguez, and left home at 15 to live with a relative in Bogotá. At 17, on the recommendation of Radamel García, the father of Radamel Falcao, he joined the youth system of River Plate in Buenos Aires, where he lived in the club's residence and became the first Colombian goalkeeper in its fifth division. He progressed as far as River's reserve side, working with the former Argentina goalkeeper Ubaldo Fillol, before returning to Colombia.

== Club career ==
=== Medellín, Depor and Orsomarso ===
After returning from Argentina, Quintana joined Independiente Medellín, where he was initially too young to be registered for competition. He made his professional debut in 2015 on loan at Depor, a club from Cali in the Categoría Primera B later renamed Atlético, and moved on to fellow second-tier side Orsomarso in 2016; across the two clubs he made 38 league appearances as a starter. He returned to Medellín in July 2016 to compete for a place in the first team, but did not make a league appearance for the club, and spent 2017 on the books of his hometown club Deportes Tolima.

=== Atlético Huila ===
Quintana joined Atlético Huila in 2018, when an injury to the club's goalkeeper Bréiner Castillo opened a place in the squad under coach Néstor Craviotto, and made his debut in the Categoría Primera A that year. He was Huila's regular goalkeeper in the 2019 Apertura, playing 14 matches and making 54 saves in a side that conceded 20 goals, and left the club after 23 league and cup appearances.

=== Atlético Nacional ===
On 3 July 2019, Quintana joined Atlético Nacional on a one-year loan with an option to buy, as the club's seventh signing of the window. Coach Juan Carlos Osorio had requested him to compete with José Fernando Cuadrado, and he played seven matches in the second half of 2019, keeping four clean sheets. He became Nacional's first-choice goalkeeper in 2021, playing 39 league matches and seven in the Copa Colombia that year. He kept goal in both legs of the 2021 Copa Colombia final against Deportivo Pereira, which Nacional won 5–0 at home on 10 November and lost 1–0 away on 24 November to take the trophy 5–1 on aggregate. In December 2021, during a run of eight league matches without a win, a private audio message in which he criticised the club's supporters was leaked; Quintana apologised, saying the remarks had been taken out of context, and the club condemned the leak while publicly backing him.

Quintana missed the start of 2022 while recovering from osteitis pubis and regaining fitness after a bout of COVID-19, and Kevin Mier replaced him for the opening match. On 27 February 2022 he was substituted at half-time of a 3–1 defeat to Atlético Bucaramanga after an error led to Sherman Cárdenas's goal, and Mier kept the position for the rest of the Apertura, which Nacional won by beating Deportes Tolima in the final. He played only once in the league during the Clausura, and by October 2022 had made 81 appearances for Nacional in all competitions. He later described his final months at the club, during which he was jeered by supporters and received threats, as among the hardest of his career.

=== Loan to Deportivo Pereira ===
At the end of December 2022, after extending his contract with Nacional by two years, Quintana was loaned for the 2023 season to Deportivo Pereira, the reigning league champions, whose coach Alejandro Restrepo had managed him at Nacional. His first competitive match for Pereira was the Superliga against Nacional on 16 February 2023, which Pereira lost 4–3 after leading 2–0 at half-time; he conceded the penalty from which Nacional equalised at 3–3. In the 2023 Copa Libertadores, the club's first appearance in the competition, Pereira beat Boca Juniors 1–0 at home and secured second place in their group behind Boca with a goalless draw away to Colo-Colo on 29 June. They eliminated Independiente del Valle 2–1 on aggregate in the round of 16, holding a 1–1 draw in Quito on 9 August after winning the first leg 1–0, before losing 4–0 on aggregate to Palmeiras in the quarter-finals.

=== Atlético Bucaramanga ===
Quintana joined Atlético Bucaramanga on loan from Nacional for the 2024 season under coach Rafael Dudamel. In March he went 557 minutes without conceding a league goal, a run that drew comparisons with the Colombian record of 1,024 minutes set by Otoniel Quintana in 1971. Bucaramanga reached the final of the 2024 Apertura against Santa Fe, winning the first leg 1–0 at home before losing the return match 3–2 at El Campín on 15 June, which left the tie level at 3–3. In the shoot-out, Quintana saved from Agustín Rodríguez and then from Julián Millán to win it 6–5, giving Bucaramanga the first league title in their 75-year history, and he was named the best player of the second leg. He was selected as the goalkeeper in the players' union Acolfutpro's team of the year for 2024.

After his loan expired, Quintana signed for Bucaramanga as a free agent; his new contract was reported in December 2024 to run until the end of 2026, by which point he had played 51 matches for the club and kept 25 clean sheets. In the two-legged Superliga against his former club Nacional, he made a series of saves to secure a 1–1 draw in Medellín on 29 January 2025 while Bucaramanga played much of the match with ten men; the second leg ended goalless on 6 February, and Nacional won the shoot-out 4–3. Bucaramanga returned to the Copa Libertadores in 2025 for the first time since 1998, drawn in a group with Racing Club, Colo-Colo and Fortaleza; a 1–0 defeat away to Colo-Colo in the final round left them third, sending them to the Copa Sudamericana knockout play-offs against Atlético Mineiro. He played 44 of Bucaramanga's 46 league matches in 2025 and kept 20 clean sheets, for which the DIMAYOR presented him with its award for the league's most clean sheets of the year. On 13 March 2026 Bucaramanga rescinded his contract at his request; he left having played 120 matches for the club, with 54 clean sheets and 11 penalty saves.

=== Independiente del Valle ===
Independiente del Valle announced Quintana's signing on 17 March 2026, presenting him with the tagline "KINGtana", after their goalkeeper Guido Villar was ruled out with a knee injury; he signed a three-season contract, with the club reported to have paid his US$350,000 release clause. He made his debut two days later in a 2–0 league defeat away to Emelec. In the 2026 Copa Libertadores group stage he made nine saves in a goalless draw away to Rosario Central on 9 April and was named player of the match; Independiente del Valle went on to top the group ahead of Rosario Central on head-to-head record. On 13 May he started as Independiente del Valle beat Universidad Católica 3–0 in Quito to win the 2026 Supercopa Ecuador, his first title with the club. In the round of 16 the club was drawn against Deportes Tolima, returning Quintana to Ibagué for a 1–0 away win on 18 August before a 3–1 home victory completed a 4–1 aggregate win. Flamengo won the first leg of the quarter-final 2–0 in Quito on 10 September, and in the second leg at the Maracanã a week later, Quintana misjudged a long ball late in the match, allowing Giorgian de Arrascaeta to head into an empty net for a 1–1 draw that completed Flamengo's 3–1 aggregate win.

== International career ==
Quintana was one of six goalkeepers in Carlos Queiroz's 40-man preliminary Colombia squad for the 2019 Copa América, announced on 15 May 2019 while he was at Huila, but was not selected for the final 23.

Queiroz called him up in August 2019 for friendlies against Brazil and Venezuela, and again in 2020 for World Cup qualifiers against Venezuela and Chile.

On 10 June 2021 Reinaldo Rueda named him in Colombia's squad for the 2021 Copa América alongside David Ospina and Camilo Vargas; he did not play as Colombia finished third. By October 2024 he had received around 20 senior call-ups without making his debut.

His omission from Néstor Lorenzo's squad for friendlies against Mexico and Canada in October 2025, despite his form at Bucaramanga, drew criticism in the Colombian press.

On 17 September 2026 Lorenzo recalled him, alongside Álvaro Montero and Mier, for friendlies against Mexico, Paraguay and Peru. On 2 October 2026, Quintana made his debut against Paraguay.

== Style of play ==
Quintana is a 1.95 m goalkeeper who is secure both in the air and on the ground, and he has described himself as calm and reliable, with good technique and reactions. Penalty-stopping became a feature of his time at Bucaramanga, where he saved 11 penalties in 120 matches, including two in the shoot-out that won the 2024 Apertura final.

== Personal life ==
Quintana has cited René Higuita as a goalkeeper he admires. His son was born in Bucaramanga on 9 April 2026, the day of Independiente del Valle's match at Rosario Central; road blockades in Colombia forced him to complete the journey to meet his son by motorcycle.

== Career statistics ==
=== Club ===
As of match played 13 September 2026

Appearances and goals by club, season and competition
Club	Season	League			Cup (Note: Appearances in the Copa Colombia)		Continental (Note: Appearances in the Copa Libertadores and Copa Sudamericana)		Other (Note: Appearances in the Superliga Colombiana)		Total	
Club	Season	Division	Apps	Goals	Apps	Goals	Apps	Goals	Apps	Goals	Apps	Goals
Depor (loan)	2015	Categoría Primera B	20	0	3	0	—		—		23	0
Orsomarso S.C.	2016	Categoría Primera B	8	0	2	0	—		—		10	0
Independiente Medellín	2016	Liga DIMAYOR	0	0	—		0	0	—		0	0
Deportes Tolima	2017	Liga DIMAYOR	0	0	0	0	0	0	—		0	0
Atlético Huila	2018	Liga DIMAYOR	4	0	2	0	—		—		6	0
Atlético Huila	2019	Liga DIMAYOR	14	0	3	0	—		—		17	0
Atlético Huila	Total		18	0	5	0	—		—		23	0
Atlético Nacional	2019	Liga DIMAYOR	6	0	1	0	—		—		7	0
Atlético Nacional	2020	Liga DIMAYOR	7	0	2	0	2	0	—		11	0
Atlético Nacional	2021	Liga DIMAYOR	39	0	7	0	10	0	—		56	0
Atlético Nacional	2022	Liga DIMAYOR	6	0	1	0	0	0	—		7	0
Atlético Nacional	Total		58	0	11	0	12	0	—		81	0
Deportivo Pereira (loan)	2023	Liga DIMAYOR	34	0	6	0	10	0	2	0	52	0
Atlético Bucaramanga (loan)	2024	Liga DIMAYOR	42	0	9	0	—		—		51	0
Atlético Bucaramanga	2025	Liga DIMAYOR	44	0	5	0	8	0	—		57	0
Independiente del Valle	2026	Liga DIMAYOR	26	0	0	0	10	0	1	0	37	0
Career total			250	0	41	0	40	0	3	0	334	0

=== International ===
As of match played 2 October 2026

Appearances and goals by national team and year
National team	Year	Apps	Goals
Colombia	2026	1	0
Total		1	0

== Honours ==
Atlético Nacional

- Liga DIMAYOR: 2022 Apertura
- Copa Colombia: 2021

Atlético Bucaramanga

- Liga DIMAYOR: 2024 Apertura

Independiente del Valle

- Supercopa Ecuador: 2026

Colombia

- Copa América third place: 2021

Individual

- Acolfutpro Team of the Year: 2024
- DIMAYOR award for most clean sheets: 2025
