= Luis Vásquez (footballer) =

Colombian footballer (born 1996)

Personal information
- Full name: Luis Erney Vásquez Caicedo
- Date of birth: 1 March 1996 (age 30)
- Place of birth: Florida, Colombia
- Height: 1.86 m (6 ft 1 in)
- Position: Goalkeeper

Team information
- Current team: Atlético Bucaramanga
- Number: 12

Youth career
- Independiente Medellín

Senior career*
Years	Team	Apps	(Gls)
2013–2016	Independiente Medellín	10	(0)
2017–2018	Real Cartagena	11	(0)
2018	Atlético Junior	0	(0)
2019	Valledupar	29	(0)
2020–2023	Independiente Medellín	40	(0)
2023	Atlético Huila	6	(0)
2024–	Atlético Bucaramanga	16	(0)

International career
2014–2015	Colombia U20	3	(0)
- * Club domestic league appearances and goals as of 11 December 2025

Luis Erney Vásquez (born 1 March 1996) is a Colombian professional footballer who plays as a goalkeeper for Categoría Primera A club Atlético Bucaramanga.
