= Martín Rea =

Uruguayan footballer (born 1997)

Personal information
- Full name: Martín Rea Zuccotti
- Date of birth: 13 November 1997 (age 29)
- Place of birth: Montevideo, Uruguay
- Height: 1.83 m (6 ft 0 in)
- Position: Centre-back

Team information
- Current team: Liverpool Montevideo
- Number: 2

Youth career
- Club Náutico
- 2011–2017: Danubio

Senior career*
Years	Team	Apps	(Gls)
2018–2019	Danubio	12	(1)
2018–2019	→ Atlético Mineiro (loan)	2	(0)
2019–2020	Atlante	25	(1)
2020–2021	Querétaro	15	(0)
2021–2023	Danubio	73	(2)
2024	Goiás	0	(0)
2024	Deportivo Cali	7	(0)
2025–	Liverpool Montevideo	28	(1)
- * Club domestic league appearances and goals as of 1 October 2025

Martín Rea Zuccotti (born 13 November 1997) is a Uruguayan footballer who plays as a centre-back for Liverpool Montevideo.

== Career statistics ==
=== Club ===
As of 13 June 2019.

Club	Season	League			Cup		Continental		Other		Total	
Club	Season	Division	Apps	Goals	Apps	Goals	Apps	Goals	Apps	Goals	Apps	Goals
Danubio	2018	Primera División	12	1	—		1 (Note: Appearance in Copa Sudamericana)	0	—		13	1
Atlético Mineiro	2018	Série A	0	0	—		—		—		0	0
Atlético Mineiro	2019	Série A	0	0	—		—		2 (Note: Appearances in Campeonato Mineiro)	0	2	0
Career total			12	1	0	0	1	0	2	0	15	1
