= Carlos Romaña =

Colombian footballer (born 1999)

Personal information
- Full name: Carlos Alberto Romaña Mena
- Date of birth: 10 November 1999 (age 27)
- Place of birth: Vigía del Fuerte, Colombia
- Height: 1.85 m (6 ft 1 in)
- Position: Centre-back

Team information
- Current team: Atlético Bucaramanga
- Number: 23

Youth career
- Boyacá Chicó

Senior career*
| Years | Team | Apps | (Gls) |
| 2018–2019 | Boyacá Chicó | 5 | (0) |
| 2020 | Delfines del Este | 0 | (0) |
| 2020 | → Villa Española (loan) | 0 | (0) |
| 2021–2022 | Danubio | 22 | (0) |
| 2023 | Deportes Quindío | 25 | (1) |
| 2024– | Atlético Bucaramanga | 53 | (1) |

International career
| 2019 | Colombia U20 | 2 | (0) |
- * Club domestic league appearances and goals as of 11 December 2025

Carlos Romaña (born 10 November 1999) is a Colombian football player who plays as centre-back for Atlético Bucaramanga.

== Career ==
=== Club career ===
In February 2020, Romaña moved to Delfines del Este FC in the Dominican Republic. However, at the end of the same month, he was loaned out to Uruguayan club C.S.D. Villa Española.

On 15 December 2020, Romaña signed with Uruguayan Primera División club Danubio. After playing for Deportes Quindío in 2023, Romaña joined Atlético Bucaramanga.
