= Larry Vásquez =

Colombian footballer (born 1992)

Personal information
- Full name: Larry Vásquez Ortega
- Date of birth: 19 September 1992 (age 34)
- Place of birth: El Zulia, North Santander, Colombia
- Height: 1.86 m (6 ft 1 in)
- Position: Midfielder

Team information
- Current team: Amazonas
- Number: 5

Youth career
- Academia

Senior career*
Years	Team	Apps	(Gls)
2011–2012	Academia	12	(0)
2012	Llaneros	13	(0)
2013–2017	Patriotas	120	(2)
2017–2019	Tigres UANL	3	(0)
2018	→ América de Cali (loan)	13	(0)
2019	→ Deportes Tolima (loan)	43	(1)
2020–2021	Atlético Junior	54	(5)
2022–2024	Millonarios	101	(4)
2024–2025	Bucaramanga	17	(0)
2025–	Amazonas	35	(0)
- * Club domestic league appearances and goals as of 18 December 2025

Larry Vásquez Ortega (born 19 September 1992) is a Colombian professional footballer who plays as a midfielder for Amazonas.

== Career statistics ==
=== Club ===
Club	Division	Season	League		Cup		Continental		Total	
Club	Division	Season	Apps	Goals	Apps	Goals	Apps	Goals	Apps	Goals
Academia	Categoría Primera B	2011	0	0	1	0	—		1	0
Academia	Categoría Primera B	2012	12	0	5	1	—		17	1
Academia	Total		12	0	6	1	—		18	1
Llaneros	Categoría Primera B	2012	13	0	—		—		13	0
Patriotas	Categoría Primera A	2013	15	0	6	0	—		21	0
Patriotas	Categoría Primera A	2014	25	1	12	0	—		32	1
Patriotas	Categoría Primera A	2015	32	0	5	1	—		37	1
Patriotas	Categoría Primera A	2016	18	0	6	1	—		24	1
Patriotas	Categoría Primera A	2017	30	1	4	0	4	1	38	2
Patriotas	Total		120	2	33	2	4	1	157	5
Tigres UANL	Liga MX	2017-18	3	0	1	0	2	0	6	0
América de Cali	Categoría Primera A	2018	13	0	1	0	—		14	0
Deportes Tolima	Categoría Primera A	2019	43	1	5	1	7	0	55	2
Atlético Junior	Categoría Primera A	2020	14	1	3	1	4	0	21	2
Atlético Junior	Categoría Primera A	2021	40	2	2	1	11	0	53	3
Atlético Junior	Total		54	3	5	2	15	0	74	5
Millonarios	Categoría Primera A	2022	43	1	5	0	2	0	50	1
Millonarios	Categoría Primera A	2023	41	2	8	0	9	0	58	2
Millonarios	Categoría Primera A	2024	17	1	2	0	3	0	22	1
Millonarios	Total		101	4	15	0	14	0	130	4
Bucaramanga	Categoría Primera A	2024	16	0	5	0	—		21	0
Bucaramanga	Categoría Primera A	2025	1	0	1	0	—		2	0
Bucaramanga	Total		17	0	6	0	0	0	23	0
Amazonas	Campeonato Brasileiro Série B	2025	8	0	1	0	—		9	0
Career total			329	7	54	6	40	1	416	14

== Personal life ==
His brother Omar Vásquez is also a footballer.

== Honours ==
Tigres UANL

- Liga MX (1): Apertura 2017

Atlético Junior

- Superliga Colombiana (1): 2020

Millonarios

- Copa Colombia (1): 2022
- Categoría Primera A (1) :2023–I
- Superliga Colombiana (1): 2024
