= Michael Rangel =

Colombian footballer (born 1991)

Personal information
- Full name: Michael Jhon Ander Rangel Valencia
- Date of birth: March 8, 1991 (age 35)
- Place of birth: Floridablanca, Colombia
- Height: 1.85 m (6 ft 1 in)
- Position: Forward

Team information
- Current team: Aurora

Youth career
- 2010: Junior

Senior career*
Years	Team	Apps	(Gls)
2011	Real Santander	1	(0)
2012	Depor Aguablanca	11	(5)
2012–2013	Alianza Petrolera	59	(15)
2014–2016	Atlético Nacional	2	(0)
2014	→ Envigado (loan)	15	(2)
2014	→ Santa Fe (loan)	12	(1)
2015–2016	→ Millonarios (loan)	28	(13)
2016–2021	Junior	48	(12)
2017	→ Kasımpaşa (loan)	12	(3)
2018	→ Atlético Bucaramanga (loan)	37	(16)
2019–2020	→ América de Cali (loan)	29	(18)
2021	→ Santa Fe (loan)	2	(1)
2021	→ Mazatlán (loan)	19	(4)
2022	Deportes Tolima	31	(7)
2023	Aucas	7	(0)
2023	Central Córdoba SdE	7	(0)
2024–2025	Alianza	9	(0)
2025–2026	Llaneros F.C.	32	(5)
2026–	Aurora	0	(0)

International career
2017	Colombia	1	(0)
- * Club domestic league appearances and goals as of 12 December 2025

Michael Rangel (born 8 March 1991) is a Colombian professional footballer who plays as a forward for FBF División Profesional club Aurora.

== Honours ==
=== Club ===
Alianza Petrolera

- Categoría Primera B (1): 2012–II

Santa Fe

- Categoría Primera A (1): 2014–II

Junior

- Superliga Colombiana (2): 2019, 2020
- Categoría Primera A (1): 2019–I,

América

- Categoría Primera A (1): 2019–II

Tolima

- Superliga Colombiana (1): 2022
