= Kevin Londoño =

Colombian footballer (born 1993)

Personal information
- Full name: Kevin Alexander Londoño Asprilla
- Date of birth: 23 November 1993 (age 32)
- Place of birth: Bello, Antioquia, Colombia
- Height: 1.80 m (5 ft 11 in)
- Position: Winger

Team information
- Current team: Atlético Bucaramanga
- Number: 7

Youth career
- Salento Bello

Senior career*
Years	Team	Apps	(Gls)
2013–2014	Leones	60	(3)
2015–2016	Fortaleza	49	(6)
2016	Rionegro Águilas	12	(1)
2017–2018	Jaguares de Córdoba	50	(3)
2018–2020	Once Caldas	45	(4)
2020–2021	Hatta Club	10	(1)
2021	Independiente Medellín	19	(0)
2022	Alianza Petrolera	36	(6)
2023	La Equidad	20	(1)
2023–2024	Independiente Santa Fé	13	(0)
2024	→ Deportivo Pasto (loan)	42	(7)
2025–	Atlético Bucaramanga	43	(2)
- * Club domestic league appearances and goals as of 11 December 2025

Kevin Alexander Londoño Asprilla (born 23 November 1993), commonly known as Kevin Londoño, is a Colombian professional footballer who plays as a winger for Categoría Primera A club Atlético Bucaramanga.
