= Leonardo Flores (footballer, born 1995) =

Venezuelan footballer

Personal information
- Full name: Leonardo José Flores Soto
- Date of birth: 5 August 1995 (age 31)
- Place of birth: El Nula, Venezuela
- Position: Midfielder

Team information
- Current team: Atletico Bucaramanga
- Number: 28

Youth career
- Caracas

Senior career*
Years	Team	Apps	(Gls)
2014–2023	Caracas	156	(2)
2022	Patriotas (loan)	23	(0)
2024–	Atletico Bucaramanga	67	(6)

International career^{‡}
2025–	Venezuela	2	(0)
- * Club domestic league appearances and goals as of 11 December 2025 ‡ National team caps and goals as of 23:33, 4 September 2025 (UTC)

Leonardo José Flores Soto (born 5 August 1995) is a Venezuelan professional footballer who plays as a midfielder for Atletico Bucaramanga and the Venezuela national team.

== Career ==
Flores' career started with Caracas. He was awarded his professional debut in February 2014, being substituted on with eleven minutes remaining of a Venezuelan Primera División encounter with Deportivo La Guaira. Flores made a further twenty-four appearances in all competitions for Caracas between the 2014–15 and 2016 seasons, notably featuring in continental football for the first time on 2 February 2016 during a Copa Libertadores defeat to Huracán.

== Career statistics ==
=== International ===
As of match played 4 September 2025

Appearances and goals by national team and year
National team	Year	Apps	Goals
Venezuela	2025	2	0
Total		2	0

== Honours ==
Atlético Bucaramanga

- Categoría Primera A: 2024-I
