= Fabry (footballer) =

Colombian footballer (born 1992)

Personal information
- Full name: Edwin Fabricio Castro Barros
- Date of birth: 21 February 1992 (age 34)
- Place of birth: Santa Bárbara, Colombia
- Height: 1.82 m (5 ft 11 1/2 in)
- Position: Midfielder

Team information
- Current team: Atlético Bucaramanga
- Number: 22

Youth career
- Carlos Sarmiento Lora
- 2009–2012: Quilmes
- 2012: Deportivo Pasto

Senior career*
| Years | Team | Apps | (Gls) |
| 2013 | Deportivo Pasto | 10 | (0) |
| 2014 | Guarani | 2 | (0) |
| 2015–2017 | Rayo Majadahonda | 53 | (2) |
| 2017–2018 | Servette | 44 | (1) |
| 2018–2021 | PAS Giannina | 53 | (3) |
| 2021–2022 | Apollon Smyrnis | 29 | (0) |
| 2022–2023 | Deportivo Cali | 18 | (1) |
| 2024– | Atlético Bucaramanga | 62 | (4) |
- * Club domestic league appearances and goals as of 14 August 2025

Edwin Fabricio Castro Barros (born 21 February 1992), commonly known as Fabry, is a Colombian professional footballer who plays as a midfielder for Atlético Bucaramanga.

== Club career ==
Born in Santa Bárbara, Santander, Fabry played youth football for Escuela Carlos Sarmiento Lora and Quilmes before being promoted to the reserve team in 2011. The following year he joined Deportivo Pasto, again assigned to the B-side.

Fabry made his first team debut on 13 February 2013, coming on as a late substitute in a 1–1 Copa Colombia away draw against Cortuluá. He scored his first goal as a senior on 8 May, netting the game's only in an away success over Universitario Popayán.

On 16 June 2014, Fabry signed for Brazilian Série C club Guarani, alongside compatriot Jhon Obregón. However, he only appeared twice for the club (both from the bench) before being released.

In January 2015, Fabry joined Spanish Tercera División side CF Rayo Majadahonda. After helping in their promotion to Segunda División B, he renewed with the club.

In February 2017, Fabry joined Swiss Challenge League club Servette FC.

In June 2018, Fabry joined Greek Super League club PAS Giannina. In July 2021 Fabry left the club.

On 16 July 2021, Greek Super League club Apollon Smyrnis announced the signing of Fabry with a succinct announcement, without disclosing the terms or the duration of the contract, who is expected to be an ideal solution for the midfield, as a player with experience in Greece and as a player who had impressive performances with PAS Giannina during his three previous seasons.

== Honours ==
PAS Giannina

- Super League Greece 2: 2019–20
