= Fredy Hinestroza =

Colombian footballer (born 1990)

Freddy Hinestroza
Personal information
- Full name: Fredy Hinestroza Arias
- Date of birth: 5 April 1990 (age 36)
- Place of birth: Medellín, Colombia
- Height: 1.75 m (5 ft 9 in)
- Position: Winger

Team information
- Current team: Atletico Bucaramanga
- Number: 8

Senior career*
| Years | Team | Apps | (Gls) |
| 2011 | Atlético Nacional | 1 | (0) |
| 2012–2016 | La Equidad | 98 | (7) |
| 2014–2015 | → Getafe (loan) | 39 | (2) |
| 2015–2016 | → Zaragoza (loan) | 32 | (2) |
| 2016 | → Santos Laguna (loan) | 14 | (0) |
| 2017 | Veracruz | 9 | (0) |
| 2018 | Rionegro Águilas | 39 | (3) |
| 2019–2023 | Junior | 214 | (18) |
| 2024– | Atletico Bucaramanga | 65 | (3) |

International career
| 2022–2023 | Colombia | 2 | (0) |
- * Club domestic league appearances and goals as of 11 December 2025

Freddy Hinestroza Arias (born 5 April 1990) is a Colombian professional footballer who plays as a winger for Colombian club Atlético Bucaramanga.

== Club career ==
Born in Medellín, Hinestroza played for lowly CF Ferroválvulas de Medellín before passing in a trial at Atlético Nacional in October 2010. He failed to adapt into his new team, suffering with injuries and having dual registration problems.

Despite appearing regularly during the pre-season (also occasionally playing as a left back), He only appeared in one league game for Atlético Nacional, a 1–2 home loss against La Equidad on 31 August 2011.

On 23 January 2012 Hinestroza moved to La Equidad. He scored his first goal on 17 June, netting his side's last in a 2–2 home draw against Independiente Santa Fe. He was an ever-present midfield unit during Equidad's following campaigns.

On 8 July 2014 Hinestroza moved abroad for the first time in his career, joining La Liga side Getafe CF in a one-year loan deal. He made his debut in the competition on 24 August, coming on as a second half substitute for Pablo Sarabia in a 1–3 away loss against Celta de Vigo.

On 5 August 2015 Hinestroza was loaned to Real Zaragoza in Segunda División, for one year.

Shortly before the 2019 Apertura, Hinestroza joined Atlético Junior.

On 20 December 2023, Hinestroza joined Atlético Bucaramanga for the 2024 season.

== International career ==
Hinestroza made his debut for the Colombia national team on 16 January 2022 in a 2–1 home win over Honduras.

== Honours ==
=== Club ===
Atlético Nacional

- Categoría Primera A (1): 2011–I

Junior

- Superliga Colombiana (2): 2019; 2020
- Categoría Primera A (2): 2019–I, 2023-II

Atlético Bucaramanga

- Categoría Primera A (1): 2024-1
