= Fabián Sambueza =

Argentine footballer

Personal information
- Full name: Fabián Héctor Sambueza
- Date of birth: 1 August 1988 (age 38)
- Place of birth: Neuquén, Argentina
- Height: 1.70 m (5 ft 7 in)
- Position: Attacking midfielder

Team information
- Current team: Atlético Bucaramanga
- Number: 10

Senior career*
Years	Team	Apps	(Gls)
2009–2010	Independiente de Neuquén	28	(4)
2010–2011	Huracán de Comodoro	36	(5)
2011–2013	Racing de Trelew	26	(3)
2013	Deportivo Roca	4	(0)
2013–2016	Temperley	67	(8)
2016–2018	Deportivo Cali	83	(21)
2018–2019	Junior	26	(4)
2019–2020	Santa Fe	45	(8)
2021–2022	Junior	78	(7)
2023	Santa Fe	17	(2)
2024–	Atlético Bucaramanga	75	(13)
- * Club domestic league appearances and goals as of 11 December 2025

Fabián Sambueza (born 1 August 1988) is an Argentine professional footballer who plays as a midfielder for Colombian Atlético Bucaramanga. He is the younger brother of Rubens Sambueza.

== Honours ==
=== Club ===
Junior

- Categoría Primera A (2): 2018–II, 2019–I
- Superliga Colombiana (1): 2019

Atlético Bucaramanga

- Categoría Primera A (1): 2024–I
