= Estadio Américo Montanini =

Football stadium in Bucaramanga, Colombia

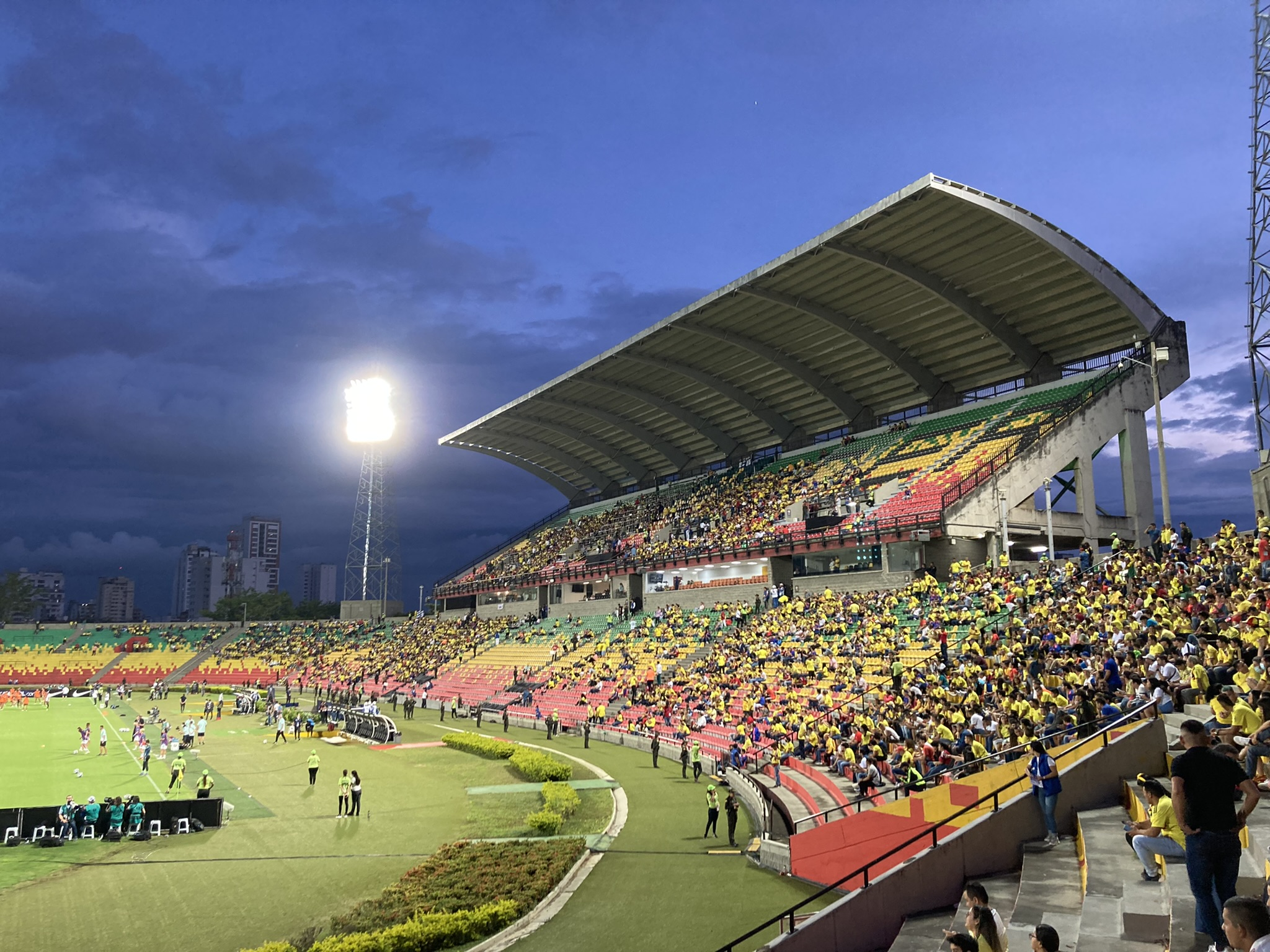
- Estadio Américo Montanini
- Interactive map of Estadio Américo Montanini
- Coordinates: 7°08′N 73°07′W
- Owner: InderSantander
- Capacity: 28,000
- Surface: Artificial turf 2006–2016. Grass 2017–
- Field size: 105 x 75 m

Construction
- Opened: December 12, 1941; 84 years ago
- Architect: David Cardozo

Tenants
- Atlético Bucaramanga (1949-1953, 1956-1970, 1972-present); Real Santander (2009-2013)

Estadio Américo Montanini (formerly Alfonso López) is a sports venue located in the Colombian city of Bucaramanga. It has a capacity for 25,000 spectators. It is the headquarters of Atlético Bucaramanga, club of the Categoría Primera A of the Dimayor. Since 11 June 2024, it has been named after the Colombian-Argentine soccer player José Américo Montanini, one of the greatest idols of the leopard team.

== History ==
The structure, which was initially built to meet the needs acquired with the commitment to hold the V National Games, was inaugurated on 12 December 1941. It was named Sports Unit Alfonso López Pumarejo, in honor of the one who led the reins of the nation for two periods (1934 to 1938 and 1942 to 1945), decree issued by the governor of the time, Alfredo Cadena D'Costa.

The stage did not have a specific use until 1949, when it began to serve as the headquarters of the nascent football team Atlético Bucaramanga; Since then, three interventions have been performed. The first occurred in 1955, in which the western sector was built to be cast in concrete, but with a reduced extension compared to the existing one. It would be 17 years before the second intervention was carried out on the embankment in 1972, where a larger stand was built, expanding the north and south platforms, while small radio booths for the press were built in the eastern stand. With this intervention the capacity would go from 10,000 to 15,000 spectators.

The holding of the National Games 1996 was the purpose of the last important expansion. The works consisted of specifically erecting a parking lot for cars, removing the cover on the western stand, moving the radio booths, constructing boxes for dignitaries, expanding the north and south west stands and, finally, the construction of a preferential high grandstand, which increased the capacity of the stage to a capacity of 28,000 spectators.

=== Synthetic grass ===
In 2006 the Alfonso López stadium underwent a change of grass, to reduce costs in the maintenance of the field. This is how this plaza became the first in Colombia to have synthetic field Star 2.

The new grass debuted with a friendly match between Atlético Bucaramanga and Club Olimpia from Paraguay, which ended with a 1:2 victory for the visitor. On 16 November 2007, FIFA grants official quality certification to synthetic grass.

=== East stand expansion project ===
Since 2014 the expansion of the eastern stand of the stadium has been planned, but the lack of resources and the corruption of some administrations has not allowed the project to be carried out. In 2020, the departmental authorities had in their government plan to expand the eastern stand to reach a maximum capacity on the stage of 33,000 spectators, with seats and a roof in all stands, if Colombia was chosen to host the 2023 FIFA Women's World Cup. When the joint candidacy of Australia and New Zealand was chosen by FIFA, the implementation of the project was put back.

=== Change to natural grass and adjustments ===
In November 2016 the recovery work on the stage began, including the change to Natural grass Bermuda 419, which is the same used by the stadiums that host international games, this after 10 years after the stage was installed. artificial grass, which completed its useful life sporting cycle. In addition, work began to install seating in the upper and lower western and eastern stands, which reduced the capacity of the stage to 25,000 spectators. The perimeter mesh was also removed, biomedical equipment was installed and adjustments were made to the press boxes and dressing rooms. The synthetic grass that was removed was used in the spaces where the athletic track was that was eliminated, completing the ornament of the surroundings with decorative plants and flowers. These works were delivered on 22 June 2017.

On the occasion of the Final Phase of the 2020 CONMEBOL Pre-Olympic Tournament in the city, two alternate dressing rooms, two auditoriums and a cafeteria were built inside the stadium, in addition to adaptations in the main dressing rooms, the bathrooms, the press room and the box area of the western stand. Without a doubt, the most significant reform was the installation of an electronic board in the northern area of the stadium, with a modern programmable LED lighting system.

=== Name change ===
In 2017 the initiative that had existed for several years to change the current name of the stadium to Hermán Aceros, a national sports glory and former player of Atlético Bucaramanga, was resumed, but it did not come to fruition. After Aceros died in 2018, the proposal took on a new boom, by fully complying with the requirements of Decree 2759 of 1997. After the death of the historic idol of Atlético Bucaramanga, Jose Américo Montanini, a proposal arose in the departmental assembly to name the stadium that name, because for many, the name of Alfonso López has no roots in Santander.

On 11 June 2024 after a survey conducted through his Twitter account), the Governor of Santander Juvenal Díaz officially announced that From that date on, the departmental stadium changed its name to Américo Montanini. Likewise, the city's Olympic village would be renamed Hermán Aceros.

== See also ==
- Coliseo Bicentenario
