= Atlético Bucaramanga =

Association football club in Colombia

- Full name: Club Atlético Bucaramanga S.A.
- Nicknames: Leopardos (Leopards); Búcaros (The Coral trees); Auriverdes (The Yellow and Greens)
- Founded: 11 May 1949; 77 years ago
- Ground: Américo Montanini
- Capacity: 28,000
- Owner: Óscar Álvarez
- President: Óscar Álvarez Jr.
- Head coach: Pablo Peirano
- League: Categoría Primera A
- 2025: Primera A, 7th of 20
- Website: atleticobucaramanga.com.co
Home colours	Away colours	Third colours

Club Atlético Bucaramanga S.A., better known as Atlético Bucaramanga, is a Colombian professional football team based in Bucaramanga. The club plays its home games at the Américo Montanini stadium.

The club was founded on 11 May 1949 by Rafael Chaberman, a Barranquilla businessman. Ever since, it has been a regular participant in the top flight of the Colombian professional league. The team's most recent stint in the top division began in 2016.

They have won one Categoría Primera A title, in the 2024 Apertura tournament. Prior to that championship, they had reached the finals of the Colombian football league in 1997, losing to América de Cali. That performance qualified them for the ensuing Copa Libertadores, in which they reached the second round.

== History ==
Atlético Bucaramanga's origins can be found in the regional football league of the Santander Department. Like most of Colombia's departments, Santander had a local league. However, they did not have a team capable of competing for national honors. A number of local teams hoped to change that and found a professional club that could aspire to that level.

In 1948, the directors of "Pielroja" (the most recent local champions) invited city businessman Rafael Chaberman to assist in setting up a professional team. Following Haberman's advice, the directors enlisted local businessmen, newspapers, and radio stations to promote a team. A board was assembled with Dr. Elias Solano as president, assisted by managing directors Rafael Chaberman, Vicente Díaz, Miguel González, Juan B. Silva (Treasurer), Manuel José Puyana, Eduardo Villa, Jorge Reyes Puyana, José Vicente Niño, Gustavo Mantilla, Rafael Pérez, Enrique Orduz, and Luis Fernando Sanmiguel.

The club was officially established on 11 May 1949, under the name of Club Atlético Bucaramanga. The key to the club's early foundation was the support of local clubs, and they had it—presidents of Gran Colombia FC (Vicente Díaz Romero), Eleven Friends FC (Luis Alba Pinilla), Girardot FC (Antonio "Terremoto" Durán), Freedom Concordia FC (Jorge Molina Barba) and Pielroja FC (Simón Santander) were all on board and helped supply the team with players. The result was that the club quickly assembled a team composed of players from Bucaramanga, Barrancabermeja and Barranquilla, most of whom had some experience playing at a high level. The three Guerrero brothers (center half Francisco, left wing Juan, and inside right Jorge) were an example of this sort of local talent. The club was also managed by a local, former Millonarios player Francisco "Pacho" Carvajal.

In 1949, the club applied for membership in the Colombian league and was accepted after winning a playoff match with Once Deportivo from Manizales. On 1 May 1949, Atlético Bucaramanga played its first game in the Colombian football tournament, losing to Deportivo Cali 5–1 at the Estadio Alfonso López.

This was their roster for that match:

Players

Position	Player	Notes
GK	(Colombia) Humberto Arbeláez	
DF	(Colombia) Lucas Martínez	
DF	(Colombia) Samuel Otero	
MF	(Colombia) Arturo Cárdenas	
MF	(Colombia) Noel Martínez	
MF	(Colombia) Juan Francisco Castillo	
FW	(Colombia) Alfonso Salcedo	87'
FW	(Colombia) Carlos Rodríguez	
FW	(Colombia) Marcos Benicio Gómez	▼45'
FW	(Colombia) Manuel López	
FW	(Colombia) Arturo Palomino	▼80'

Substitutions

Position	Player	Notes
DF	(Colombia) Jorge Guerrero De la Cruz	▲45'
MF	(Colombia) Roberto Alfonso Carvajal	▲80'

Coach

- (Colombia) Francisco Carvajal

Their first victory came on June 19, when they defeated Boca Juniors de Cali 2–1. The club ultimately finished the season in tenth place out of 12 teams.

Like many other Colombian clubs, Atlético Bucaramanga took advantage of the El Dorado period to sign a host of foreign players. Specifically, in 1950 they signed four Argentine players, a group collectively known as the "Four Musketeers". They were Antonio "Toto" Bernasconi (half-back), Norberto Juan Peluffo (center-half), Aristóbulo Deambrosi (right winger) and José Cayetano Fraccione (goalkeeper), nicknamed "the Flying Fish". This was just the beginning of the club's aggressive pursuit of foreign players, including the signing of Costa Rican forward José Joaquín "El Quincho" Quiroz. Quiroz in particular was known for his spectacular goals. With that group in place, the club managed a sixth-place finish in 1950. The period of success did not last. Bucaramanga had overspent during El Dorado, and the crunch quickly followed. By 1953, the club finished last and in 1954 was out of the league entirely. However, the club did not disappear. They rebuilt, and in 1956 made it back to the league.

Not only that, their connection to Argentina remained intact. The manager responsible for that rebuild, Felipe "Judio" Stemberg, was Argentine, and he brought a number of his countrymen into the side. The most important of those acquisitions was José Américo Montanini, a former striker for River Plate. He arrived at Bucaramanga in 1956, playing for them from 1956 to 1961 and from 1964 to 1968. Montanini's most successful season was the 1958 one, when he led the league in scoring with 36 goals. The club also enjoyed their most successful season yet, finishing third behind champions Santa Fe and runners-up Millonarios.

1960 should have been remembered as an even more glorious season. With Montanini and José Giarrizzo (another Argentinian) leading the attack, the club had a real shot at its first-ever championship. Just three matches remained when the club set out for Bogotá to face the league leaders, Santa Fe. However, the match was a disaster; Santa Fe romped to a 5–1 win, humiliating a Bucaramanga club that looked completely outmatched. Rather than winning the championship, the club finished in a disappointing third place. Much of the blame was put on manager Juan Barbieri, who was literally run out of town during the offseason.

It would be many years before Los Leopardos came that close again. Throughout the 1960s, 1970s, and 1980s, the club was mid-table only in their best years, more frequently finishing towards the bottom. They even had to sit out the 1971 season due to economic problems, selling their place to a team from Cartagena in order to pay off their debts.

The club enjoyed a brief revival in the 1990s with the hiring of Humberto Ortiz as manager. A defensive manager first and foremost, Ortiz's teams were physical rather than stylish, but they were competitive. He spent three years with Bucaramanga, leading them to a third-place finish in 1990, then consecutive mid-table finishes in 1991 and 1992. The club was almost unbeatable at home, losing just six out of 75 matches in their home stadium. However, in 1993 Ortiz was dismissed in favor of Norberto Peluffo, who promised a more open and attacking style of play but delivered a leaky defense in return. In 1994, Bucaramanga finished in last position in the top flight and was relegated for the first time in its history.

However, their first spell in the Categoría Primera B was short. Colombian football league was scheduled to switch to the European calendar in mid-1995 and as a result, a 4-month championship was organized prior to the change in format. Bucaramanga dominated this short tournament, and won eight out of ten matches played during the promotion round. They were promoted as Categoría Primera B champions. Key to their success was keeper Guillermo Rodolfo Guarnieri, who set a Colombian record by playing 1122 minutes (13 matches and part of a 14th) without giving up a single goal. The 1995 Torneo Adecuación ended with Bucaramanga claiming the title and returning to the top tier for the 1995–96 season.

Atlético Bucaramanga's best campaign until then was achieved in the 1996–97 season. This campaign lasted sixteen months, making it the longest in Colombian football history. The club was managed that year by Carlos Mario Hoyos, a former defender for Deportivo Cali. His roster had no stars, and in fact was mostly composed of the same players who had led the club to the Primera B title two years prior. The team performed as expected in the first half of the season, achieving unremarkable results. However, they suddenly came together in the Torneo Adecuación, finishing second overall and earning a playoff with Deportes Quindío to determine the Adecuación winners, which would be playing the championship final. A 90th-minute goal by Orlando Ballesteros won the two-legged tie for Bucaramanga and sent them into the final against América de Cali, who had won the Apertura tournament. Although América won both legs of the final, the runner-up finish in the tournament allowed Bucaramanga to qualify for the 1998 Copa Libertadores. In that tournament, they qualified out of their first round group and reached the knockout stages, where they lost to Bolivian side Bolívar in the second round.

The 1996–97 season, however, did not fundamentally change the club's fortunes, and they once again slipped down the table. In 2001, they finished last place over two stages and were relegated again. However, DIMAYOR decided to expand the top flight from 16 to 18 teams for the 2002 season, which offered Bucaramanga the chance to save themselves in a triangular playoff with Primera B teams Cúcuta Deportivo and Unión Magdalena. Bucaramanga's second-place finish (including a win in penalties over arch-rivals Cúcuta Deportivo) was good enough to keep the team in the top tier despite being unable to score a single goal in both matches of the playoff.

Los Leopardos qualified for the semifinal stage in both tournaments of the 2002 season as well as the 2004 Finalización tournament, but in the mid-2000s their fortunes began to decline. They narrowly avoided relegation in 2007, but failed to escape the drop in 2008, sealing their relegation in the last match of the first stage of that year's Finalización with a 3–0 loss to Deportivo Pereira, who were the other side with a chance to get relegated that season.

Back in Primera B for 2009, Atlético Bucaramanga reached the season finals but were upset over two legs by Cortuluá and lost the promotion play-off to Deportivo Pereira. Seven tumultuous seasons in the second tier followed up, and there were points at which the club was not even seriously contending for promotion; despite spending huge sums of money to assemble a contending squad in 2010, they finished a miserable 14th. Finally, in 2015, the club broke out of Primera B. Despite missing a chance to be promoted early in the season in a similar tournament to the one played in Cartagena in 2001, they dominated the season by collecting 71 points in 32 matches during the first stage, and then topped a semifinal group which also included América de Cali, Real Cartagena, and Universitario Popayán. With promotion already assured, Atlético Bucaramanga defeated Fortaleza over two legs to win their second Primera B title.

Despite Atlético Bucaramanga managed to reach the semifinals of the Finalización tournament in 2016 and the quarter-finals of the 2017 Apertura, they were close to relegation in 2017, reaching the last day of the regular season with chances to be relegated. A 1–0 defeat against América de Cali, who were also involved in the battle to avoid relegation, meant that Atlético Bucaramanga would be relegated once again, however, a last-minute goal by Once Caldas against Cortuluá ended up sending the latter side to the second tier and keeping Bucaramanga in the top flight. Since then, the team's performances have been enough to keep them away from the relegation contention, having also reached the semifinals of the 2018 Finalización and the 2022 Apertura.

Atlético Bucaramanga won its first Primera A title in the 2024 Apertura tournament, with Rafael Dudamel as manager. The club topped the first stage of the competition for the first time in history after winning 11 matches, drawing five and losing the remaining three for a total of 38 points, which granted it a tiebreaking advantage that proved to be crucial in the following stage of the competition. For the semi-finals Bucaramanga were seeded in Group A, with Deportivo Pereira, Millonarios, and Junior drawn into that group. The team struggled in the semi-finals, only winning one of their first five games (against Millonarios in Bogotá) and losing two against Deportivo Pereira and Junior, both away from home. However, a 3–1 victory over Pereira on the last matchday allowed Bucaramanga to advance to the final after the four teams ended up tied at 8 points, with the Búcaro side placing ahead of its three rivals on account of being one of the top two teams from the previous stage of the competition. In the final series, Bucaramanga faced Independiente Santa Fe, winning the first leg played at Estadio Alfonso López 1–0. Although the second leg, played at Estadio El Campín in Bogotá ended with a 3–2 victory for Santa Fe, Atlético Bucaramanga ended up winning the ensuing penalty shootout to claim their first championship.

== Club Nicknames ==
Atlético Bucaramanga fans and the press are fond of the nickname "Los Leopardos" (The Leopards). This name was coined in the 1950s and comes from the club's yellowish uniforms, which resemble the animal's fur. The club and its fans are also sometimes referred to as "Los Búcaros", after the Búcaro tree that gives the city of Bucaramanga its name.

== Stadium ==
Atlético Bucaramanga plays its home games at the Américo Montanini stadium in Bucaramanga, known as Estadio Alfonso López until 11 June 2024.

- Opened: 1941, renovated 2017.
- Surface: Bermuda Grass.
- Capacity: 28,000

From 2016 to mid-2017 and also 2025, the team used the Álvaro Gómez Hurtado Stadium (capacity: 12,000) in the neighboring Floridablanca, since the Alfonso López stadium was being renovated.

== East Colombian Derby ==
Atlético Bucaramanga and Cúcuta Deportivo play in one of Colombia's most heated rivalries, El Clásico del oriente colombiano (East Colombian Derby, also known as the Great Santander Derby). The first match in the rivalry was on 2 April 1950 at the Estadio Alfonso López. Cúcuta won 1–0 on a goal by Luis Alberto Miloc. Since 1950, this derby has been played 180 times; Atlético Bucaramanga have won 57 times, Cúcuta have won 61 times, and there have been 59 draws.

Although Cúcuta have had the upper hand in general, Bucaramanga won the most important game of the series in 2001. The two teams were competing in a triangular playoff to determine which club would compete in the top tier of Colombian football during the following season. The match, played in Cartagena, was scoreless for 90 minutes as well as 30 minutes of extra time. It went on to penalties, and thanks to a heroic performance from Bucaramanga keeper Leonel Rocco, Los Leopardos prevailed 5–3. Bucaramanga secured their immediate return to Primera A, while Cúcuta was forced to wait until 2005. This match was the only time that two rival teams from the same region have played a match determining promotion or relegation in the Colombian football championship.

The most recent meeting between the clubs was during a promotion playoff at the start of the 2015 season. Cúcuta won the match and went on to clinch promotion to the top tier, while Bucaramanga finished last in the group after only playing two matches.

== Fans ==
"Fortaleza Leoparda Sur" is the name of the main fan group of Atletico Bucaramanga. It was founded in 1998 by young people in order to support the team, but over time more questionable elements attached themselves to the group. As with many other such groups, Fortaleza Leoparda Sur is seen as the expression of social problems larger than football.

They occupy the south grandstand of the Estadio Américo Montanini and have participated in peaceful protests in order to request government support to solve the difficult situation of the Club, but have also taken part in a number of acts of violence. In 2011, they physically and verbally attacked players of their team for bad results. The next year, on 10 March 2012 some of them fought against other hooligans in the Estadio Arturo Cumplido Sierra in Sincelejo in the middle of the game between Sucre FC and Bucaramanga. One man was seriously injured and 19 were arrested by the police.

== Honours ==
=== Domestic ===
- Categoría Primera A
  - Winners (1): 2024–I
- Categoría Primera B
  - Winners (2): 1995, 2015
- Superliga Colombiana
  - Runners-up (1): 2025

== International competitions ==
- Copa Libertadores: 2 appearances

1998: Round of 16
2025: Group stage

- Copa Sudamericana: 2 appearances

2025: Knockout round play-offs
2026: First stage

== Players ==
=== Current squad ===
As of 24 September 2026

Note: Flags indicate national team as defined under FIFA eligibility rules; some limited exceptions apply. Players may hold more than one non-FIFA nationality.

No.	Pos.	Nation	Player
3	DF	URU	Martín Rea
4	DF	COL	José García
5	DF	COL	Adrián Murillo
6	DF	COL	Nilson Castrillón
7	MF	COL	Kevin Londoño
8	MF	COL	Fredy Hinestroza
9	FW	COL	Brandon Caicedo
10	MF	ARG	Fabián Sambueza
11	MF	COL	John Fredy Salazar (on loan from Junior)
12	GK	COL	Diego Novoa
13	FW	COL	Keysson Quinto
14	DF	COL	Juan Camilo Mosquera
17	FW	COL	Emerson Batalla
18	DF	COL	Emmanuel Largacha

No.	Pos.	Nation	Player
19	DF	COL	Aldair Gutiérrez
20	MF	COL	Aldair Zárate
22	MF	COL	Fabry Castro (captain)
23	DF	COL	Carlos Romaña
24	DF	COL	José Ortíz
25	GK	URU	Cristopher Fiermarin (on loan from Defensa y Justicia)
27	FW	ARG	Luciano Pons
28	MF	VEN	Leonardo Flores
30	MF	COL	Víctor Cantillo
32	MF	COL	Nilzo Ramírez
70	FW	COL	Félix Charrupí
80	FW	COL	Omar Albornoz
—	GK	COL	Luis Vásquez

=== Out on loan ===
Note: Flags indicate national team as defined under FIFA eligibility rules; some limited exceptions apply. Players may hold more than one non-FIFA nationality.

No.	Pos.	Nation	Player
—	MF	COL	Gustavo Charrupí (at Everton de Viña del Mar)

=== World Cup players ===
The following players were chosen to represent their country at the FIFA World Cup while contracted to Atlético Bucaramanga.

- (Panama) Gabriel Gómez (2018)

=== Notable former players ===
First golden age (1951)

- (Argentina) Antonio "Toto" Bernasconi
- (Argentina) Aristóbulo De Ambrosi
- (Argentina) Raúl Roque "Colorado" Di Marco
- (Argentina) José Cayetano "Pez Volador" Fraccione
- (Argentina) Carlos Gambina
- (Argentina) Norberto Juan Peluffo
- (Argentina) Felipe "Judío" Stemberg
- (Romania) Alexandru Negrescu
- (Colombia) Arturo "Chancharito" Cárdenas
- (Colombia) Arturo "Palomo" Palomino

The 1960s

- (Argentina) Julio "Loco" Asciolo
- (Argentina) Juan Andarín Barbieri
- (Argentina) Omar Devani
- (Argentina) Horacio Diloretto
- (Argentina) Roberto Janiot
- (Argentina) José Américo "Bordadora" Montanini
- (Argentina) Florial Rodriguez
- (Colombia) Herman "Cuca" Aceros
- (Colombia) Perfecto Rodriguez
- (Paraguay) Adolfo Riquelme
- (Uruguay) Walter Sossa

The 1970s

- (Argentina) Agustín Balbuena
- (Argentina) José Americo "Bordadora" Montanini
- (Brazil) Eduardo Ghilio
- (Colombia) Misael "Papo" Florez
- (Colombia) Leonidas Hurtado
- (Colombia) Eduardo Emilio Vilarete
- (Socialist Federal Republic of Yugoslavia) Dragoslav Šekularac

The 1980s

- (Argentina) Juan Carlos Díaz
- (Argentina) Daniel Killer
- (Argentina) Carlos Enrique Landaburo
- (Argentina) Luis Alberto Landaburu
- (Colombia) Alfredo "Pirata" Ferrer
- (Colombia) Miguel Oswaldo "Negro" González
- (Colombia) Francisco "Pacho" Maturana
- (Colombia) Orlando "Pony" Maturana
- (Colombia) Miguel Augusto "Nano" Prince
- (Colombia) Wilson Américo Quiñonez
- (Colombia) Eusebio Veralima
- (Uruguay) Nitder Pizzani
- (Uruguay) José Luis Russo

The 1990s

- (Argentina) Pedro Manuel Olaya
- (Argentina) Jorge Ramoa
- (Cameroon) Oyié Flavié
- (Colombia) Miguel Balaguera
- (Colombia) Orlando "Fantasma" Ballesteros
- (Colombia) Jesús "Kiko" Barrios
- (Colombia) Jairo Castillo
- (Colombia) Víctor Espinosa
- (Colombia) Wilmar Moreno
- (Colombia) Oscar "Misil" Restrepo
- (Colombia) Dúmar Rueda
- (Colombia) Néstor Salazar
- (Colombia) Hernán Andrés Sarmiento
- (Colombia) Julián Téllez
- (Colombia) Oscar Upegui
- (Colombia) Albeiro Usuriaga
- (Colombia) Roberth Villamizar
- (Costa Rica) Juan Carlos Arguedas
- (Uruguay) Mauricio Silvera
- (Venezuela) Juan Manuel Castro

The 2000s

- (Argentina) Mariano Caporale
- (Colombia) Eudalio Arriaga
- (Colombia) Carlos Asprilla
- (Colombia) Sherman Cárdenas
- (Colombia) Wilson Carpintero
- (Colombia) Rafael Arlex Castillo
- (Colombia) Gilberto García
- (Colombia) Juan Carlos Henao
- (Colombia) Orlando "Pony" Maturana
- (Colombia) Humberto Mendoza
- (Colombia) Neider Morantes
- (Colombia) Leonardo Fabio Moreno
- (Colombia) Alex Orrego
- (Colombia) Luis Gabriel Rey
- (Colombia) Hernán Andrés Sarmiento
- (Panama) Eduardo Dasent
- (Paraguay) Carlos González
- (Uruguay) Luis Barbat
- (Uruguay) Jorge Daniel Casanova
- (Venezuela) Ruberth Morán
- (Venezuela) Javier Toyo

The 2010s

- (Colombia) Michael Rangel
- (Panama) Gabriel Gómez

The 2020s

- (Argentina) Fabián Sambueza
- (Colombia) Fredy Hinestroza
- (Colombia) Aldair Quintana

== Managers ==
Name	Starting	Ending	Nationality
Francisco Carvajal	1949	1949	Colombia
Aristóbulo Deambrossi	1950	1951	Argentina
Luis Alberto Fernández	1952	1953	Uruguay
Norberto Peluffo	1956	1959	Argentina
Juan Barbieri	1960	1960	Argentina
Francisco Fandiño	1961	1961	Argentina
Norberto Peluffo	1962	1962	Argentina
Abraham González	1962	1964	Uruguay
Roberto Pablo Janiot (Interim)	1964	1964	Argentina
José Vigo	1964	1964	Argentina
Carlos Zunino	1965	1965	Uruguay
Román Soto Vergara	1966	1966	Chile
Adolfo Riquelme	1966	1966	Paraguay
Manuel Sanguinetti	1966	1966	Uruguay
Adolfo Riquelme	1967	1967	Paraguay
José Américo Montanini	1967	1967	Argentina
Atilio López	1967	1968	Paraguay
Víctor Pignanelli	1968	1969	Uruguay
Adolfo Riquelme	1969	1969	Paraguay
Pablo Ansaldo	1970	1970	Ecuador
José Omar Verdún	1970	1973	Uruguay
Edgar Barona	1974	1974	Colombia
Víctor Pignanelli	1975	1977	Uruguay
Ricardo Pegnotti	1977	1977	Colombia
Álvaro Solarte	1978	1978	Colombia
Alberto Rendo	1979	1979	Argentina
Raúl Bentancor	1980	1980	Uruguay
Álvaro Solarte (Interim)	1981	1981	Colombia
Carlos Gainette	1981	1981	Brazil
José Américo Montanini (Interim)	1981	1981	Argentina
Roberto Pablo Janiot (Interim)	1981	1981	Argentina
Edilberto Righi	1982	1982	Argentina
Álvaro Solarte (Interim)	1982	1982	Colombia
Raúl Bentancor	1982	1982	Uruguay
José Américo Montanini	1983	1983	Argentina
Álvaro Solarte (Interim)	1983	1983	Colombia
Hermán Aceros	1984	1984	Colombia
Alberto Forero	1985	1985	Colombia
Hermán Aceros	1986	1986	Colombia
Roberto Omar Diplácido	1987	1987	Argentina
Germán Cristancho (Interim)	1987	1987	Colombia
Víctor Pignanelli	1987	1987	Argentina
Miguel Ángel Tojo and Roberto Telch	1988	1988	Argentina
Germán Cristancho (Interim)	1988	1988	Colombia
Daniel Silguero	1989	1989	Argentina
Álvaro Solarte (Interim)	1989	1989	Colombia
Jesús Suárez (Interim)	1989	1989	Colombia
Humberto Ortíz	1990	1992	Colombia
Norberto Peluffo	1993	1994	Colombia
Germán Cristancho (Interim)	1993	1994	Colombia
Hugo Gallego	1995	1996	Colombia
Jesús Suárez	1996	1996	Colombia
Carlos Hoyos	1996	1998	Colombia
Adolfo León Holguín	1998	1998	Colombia
Norberto Peluffo	1999	1999	Colombia
Édgar Ospina	2000	2000	Colombia
Gabriel Gómez (Interim)	2000	2000	Colombia
Carlos Paniagua	2000	2000	Colombia

Name	Starting	Ending	Nationality
Jorge Luis Pinto	2001	2001	Colombia
Darío Vélez	2001	2001	Colombia
Alexis García	2001	2001	Colombia
Orlando Restrepo	2002	2002	Colombia
Juan Eugenio Jiménez	2003	2003	Colombia
Carlos Navarrete	2003	2003	Colombia
Óscar Aristizábal	2004	2005	Colombia
Nelson Reyes	2005	2006	Colombia
Hernán Herrera	2006	2006	Colombia
Eduardo Moreno (Interim)	2006	2006	Colombia
Miguel Augusto Prince	2007	2007	Colombia
Óscar Upegui and Nelson Reyes (Interim)	2007	2007	Colombia
Eduardo Julián Retat	2007	2008	France; Colombia
Víctor Luna	2008	2008	Colombia
Arturo Reyes	2008	2008	Colombia
Jesús Barrios	2009	2009	Colombia
Miguel Augusto Prince	2010	2010	Colombia
Jorge Ernesto Ramoa (Interim)	2010	2010	Argentina
Jesús Barrios	2010	2010	Colombia
Fernando Velasco	2011	2011	Colombia
Carlos Hoyos	2011	2011	Colombia
Álvaro de Jesús Gómez	2012	2012	Colombia
José de Jesús Suárez	2012	2012	Colombia
Miguel Augusto Prince	2013	2013	Colombia
Bernardo Redín	2013	2014	Colombia
Jorge Ernesto Ramoa	2014	2014	Argentina
José Manuel Rodríguez	2014	2016	Colombia
Flabio Torres	2016	2016	Colombia
Harold Rivera	2017	2017	Colombia
Fernando Castro	2017	2017	Colombia
Jaime de La Pava	2017	2017	Colombia
Diego Cagna	2018	2018	Argentina
Adolfo León Holguín (Interim)	2018	2018	Colombia
Carlos Hoyos	2018	2018	Colombia
Flabio Torres	2018	2019	Colombia
Carlos Giraldo (Interim)	2019	2019	Colombia
Óscar Serrano	2019	2019	Colombia
Hernán Torres	2019	2019	Colombia
José Manuel Rodríguez	2019	2020	Colombia
Guillermo Sanguinetti	2020	2021	Colombia
Sergio Novoa	2021	2021	Colombia
Luis Fernando Suárez	2021	2021	Colombia
Óscar Upegui	2021	2021	Colombia
Sergio Novoa	2021	2021	Colombia
Néstor Craviotto	2021	2022	Argentina
Armando Osma	2022	2022	Colombia
Jorge Ernesto Ramoa	2022	2022	Argentina
Hernán Darío Gómez	2022	2022	Colombia
Raúl Armando	2023	2023	Argentina
Alexis Márquez	2023	2023	Colombia
Rubén Zapata and Diego Vargas (interim)	2023	2023	Colombia
Jorge Ernesto Ramoa	2023	2023	Argentina
Rafael Dudamel	2023	2024	Venezuela
Gustavo Florentín	2025	2025	Paraguay
Andrey Moreno and Elkin Salazar (interim)	2025	2025	Colombia
Leonel Álvarez	2025	2026	Colombia
Wilbert Perea (interim)	2026	2026	Colombia
Pablo Peirano	2026		Uruguay

Source: Worldfootball.net

== Bibliography ==
- Alvarez, Alfonso (2000), Vida, pasión, muerte y resurección del Atlético Bucaramanga (in Spanish)
