= Inter.co Stadium =

Soccer stadium in Orlando, United States

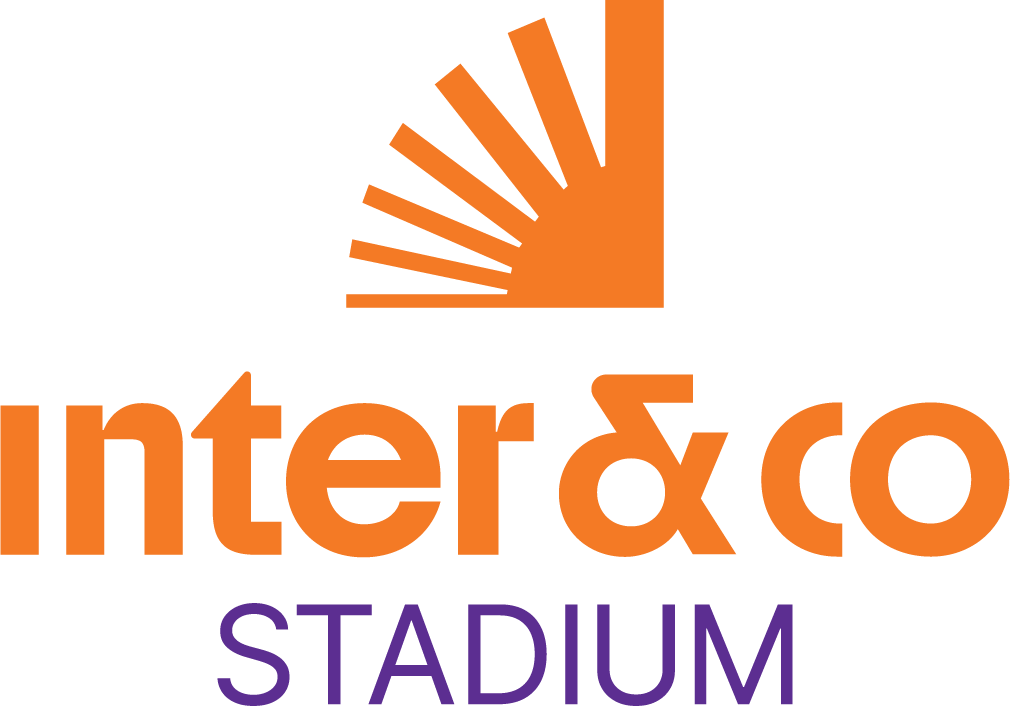

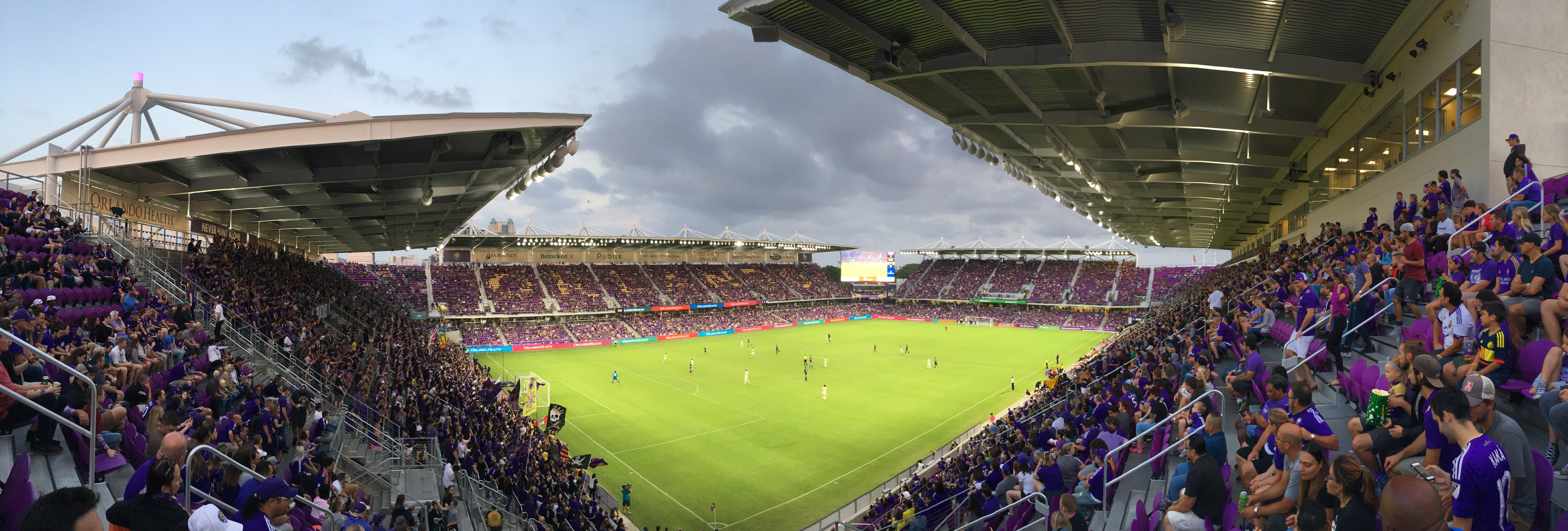
- Orlando City SC match in 2018

- Location in Florida Location in the United States
- Former names: Orlando City Stadium (2017–2019); Exploria Stadium (2019–2024) Inter&Co Stadium (2024–2026)
- Address: 655 West Church Street
- Location: Orlando, Florida, U.S.
- Coordinates: 28.5411°N 81.3893°W
- Owner: Orlando City SC
- Operator: Orlando City SC
- Capacity: 24,453
- Executive suites: 31
- Surface: Grass
- Scoreboard: Panasonic
- Field size: 120 yd × 75 yd (110 m × 69 m)
- Acreage: 10
- Public transit: Church Street Station 21, 319 Grapefruit Line

Construction
- Groundbreaking: October 16, 2014
- Opened: February 24, 2017
- Cost: $155 million
- Architect: Populous
- Project manager: ICON Venue Group
- Structural engineer: Walter P Moore
- Services engineers: M–E Engineers, Inc.
- General contractor: Barton Malow

Tenants
- Orlando City SC (MLS) (2017–present); Orlando Pride (NWSL) (2017–present); Orlando City B (USL) (2017); Florida Cup (2018–present); MLS Combine (2018–2019); Toronto FC (MLS) (2021); Cure Bowl (NCAA) (2019, 2021–2022); Orlando Storm (UFL) (2026–present)

Website
- interco-stadium.com

Inter.co Stadium (Note: formerly Orlando City Stadium, Exploria Stadium, and Inter&Co Stadium) is a soccer-specific stadium in downtown Orlando, Florida, United States. The stadium is located along West Church Street in the Parramore neighborhood west of downtown Orlando. It is the home of Orlando City SC, which entered Major League Soccer (MLS) as an expansion franchise in 2015, National Women's Soccer League (NWSL) club the Orlando Pride, and United Football League franchise Orlando Storm. The stadium was completed in time for Orlando City's home opener of the 2017 season on March 5 and it became the first venue to permanently host MLS, NWSL, and United Soccer League teams all in the same location that year.

As well as home matches for Orlando City and Orlando Pride, the stadium has been used as a host venue for both the United States men's and women's national teams, the finals for both the NWSL Championship and NCAA Women's College Cup, numerous Florida Cup games, the MLS Combine in 2018 and 2019, and the 2019 MLS All-Star Game.

Aside from soccer, the stadium hosted the 2019 and 2021 Cure Bowl, a college football bowl game, as well as the 2022 Special Olympics USA Games opening ceremony.

== History ==
In April 2013, the City of Orlando purchased downtown land for $8.2 million to be used towards the construction of a $110 million MLS soccer stadium. However, in May, the Florida House of Representatives failed to vote on a bill that had passed the Senate that would have provided up to $30 million in state funds towards the stadium project. Orlando City SC President Phil Rawlins responded by expressing his intent to find alternative funding and keep seeking MLS expansion.

The Orlando downtown soccer stadium moved closer to securing funding on August 8, 2013, when Orange County mayor Teresa Jacobs and Orlando Mayor Buddy Dyer reached an agreement on a deal to provide financial support for a variety of Orlando projects including the new MLS soccer stadium. The last piece in stadium funding was an October 2013 vote on using an existing tourism tax to fund the final quarter of the $80 million stadium project. On October 22, 2013, the Orange County Board of Commissioners voted 5–2 to approve the use of $20 million in tourist development tax funds to build an $84 million multi-purpose soccer stadium in downtown Orlando.

The National Collegiate Athletic Association (NCAA) announced on December 11, 2013, that the 2016 and 2017 NCAA Women's College Soccer Championship would be held at the new stadium.

On August 4, 2014, the team announced that the stadium location would be moved one block west, to avoid having a delay to the opening day, due to Faith Deliverance Temple fighting the city's eminent-domain claim. The new location resulted in the closure of Parramore Avenue between Church Street and Central Boulevard in February 2015, as the stadium was built right on top of where the road then ran.

The club played their 2015 MLS inaugural season home matches at Citrus Bowl. On January 13, 2016, club president Phil Rawlins announced that construction of the team's stadium was taking four months longer than expected and that the team would remain at the Citrus Bowl (since renamed Camping World Stadium) for the 2016 season.

On March 5, 2017, Orlando City began the 2017 season by hosting New York City FC in the stadium's inaugural match. Cyle Larin scored the first goal in stadium history as Orlando won 1–0 in front of a sellout crowd of 25,550.

On July 10, 2019, Orlando City progressed to their first U.S. Open Cup semi-final, defeating New York City FC on penalties after a 1–1 draw. The game received viral media coverage for what became known as "The Running of The Wall" when NYCFC won the coin toss for the penalty shoot-out and elected to kick the penalties in front of an empty South Stand, the opposite side of the stadium to The Wall where the Orlando City supporters were located. The Orlando supporters took it upon themselves to run en masse down the length of the concourse and fill up the stand directly behind the goal the penalties were being taken. Adam Grinwis saved two penalties during the shootout win.

On May 12, 2021, Orlando City majority owner Flavio Augusto da Silva announced he was in advanced negotiations with Zygi and Mark Wilf, owners of the Minnesota Vikings of the NFL, for the sale of the club including the stadium and other related soccer assets. The combined value of the deal was estimated at $400–450 million. The sale was completed on July 21, 2021.

On October 7, 2025, the United Football League announced the creation of the Orlando Storm, which would begin play in the 2026 season. The stadium and league also announced that Orlando Storm's games would be hosted at Inter&Co stadium through a multi-year partnership.

=== Financing ===
Orlando City SC's owners announced on May 29, 2015, that the stadium would be privately funded by Orlando City SC and not the city. They also announced they would upgrade the stadium's capacity from 19,000 seats, to somewhere between 25,000 and 28,000 seats. The new plan was unveiled on July 31, increasing capacity to 25,500 by adding seats to the south end to maximize seats without major design changes that would set back the project by an additional year. Costs also rose from $110 million to $155 million.

As part of the private funding venture for the new stadium, at least $15 million has come from 30 foreign investors in countries such as Brazil and China via the EB-5 investment program, which grants American visas in exchange for a $500,000 investment in the project.

More foreign investors looking to obtain green cards through the EB-5 program are joining this project, which has already created around 1000 jobs and is expected to create around 1000 more in an area that much needed its economic growth.

=== Design ===
The team released artistic renderings of the stadium on December 11, 2012. On September 30, 2013, the architectural firm Woods Bagot released their drawings of the stadium on their website. The team announced that these drawings were released without their knowledge or input, and that they had not selected an architect yet. Woods Bagot proceed to remove the images from their website. The design phase began on January 7, 2014, when Mayor Buddy Dyer and some of the Orlando City SC staff traveled to Kansas City to begin working with the design firm Populous.

The original renderings of the stadium proposed 18,000 seats, including 2,500 club seats. It would also have 300 seats in specialty suites. The stadium's square footage is about 290,000 square feet (27,000 m^{2}), with 120,000 square feet (11,000 m^{2}) devoted to the bowl. It was also supposedly going to have bars, retail shops, and restaurants.

Additional renderings and information about the stadium were released on June 10, 2014. The stadium has an open plaza, where those passing by can see inside, since the field is 8 feet (2.4 m) below street level. It was initially planned to have a seating capacity of 19,500, with the structural ability to expand to 25,000 in the future. This was changed in May 2015 to simply building room for 25,000 in the initial construction, rather than waiting for another construction period. The field is grass, with canopies over fans to protect them from the elements and to increase noise levels. Just before a game began, the lion would rotate 180° to "watch" the action. A festival plaza lined with palm trees on the south end of the plaza, just outside the main entrance at Church Street and Terry Avenue was built (the streets are closed to vehicles during events). A balcony-style bar just below the video scoreboard with a 360° view was planned as well. A seating section on the north end is dedicated to members of supporters' clubs. As proposed — and if building codes allow — it has no seats, but rails and extra room for "safe standing". The 3,811-capacity section, known as "The Wall" began as a small but ardent collection of fans from the two main supporter groups, The Ruckus and Iron Lion Firm. The supporters' section would also have its own "pub-style" area.

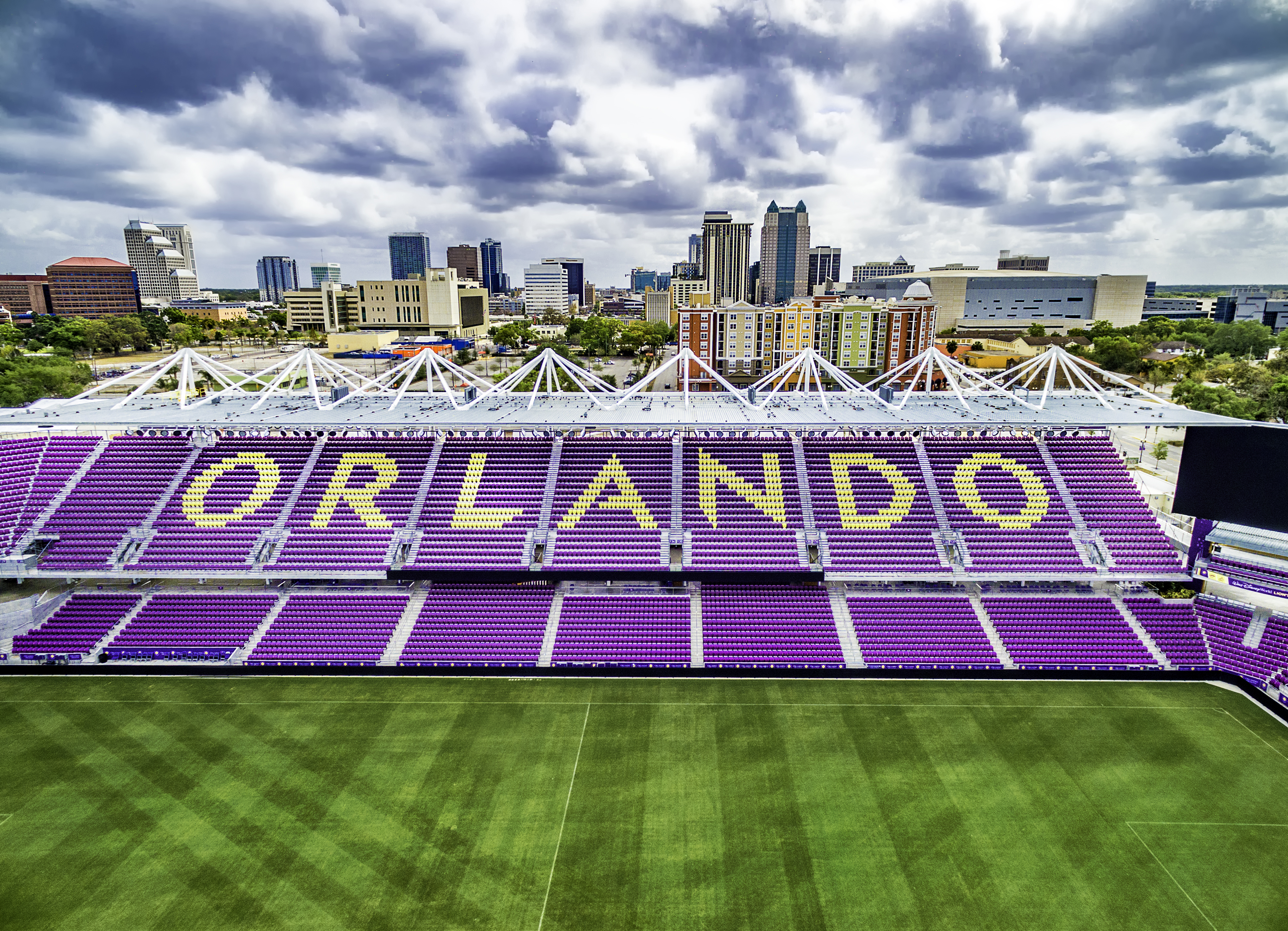
Aerial view of Inter.co Stadium

Heineken announced a partnership with multiple MLS teams on November 12, 2014, including Orlando City, making Heineken the official beer of the team as well as giving Heineken naming rights to the ground level bar on the south side of the stadium. In addition to the announcement, a new rendering of the south side from inside the stadium was released.

Panasonic was announced as the team's "Official Technology Partner" on December 17, 2014, in exchange for Panasonic providing on-field and fascia LED boards, the main scoreboard on the south end of the field, and dozens of flat panel TV screens throughout the stadium in suites, offices and work areas. In addition, Panasonic provides security cameras, control room and other key components for the new stadium.

The stadium includes 49 rainbow-colored seats in Section 12 as a memorial that honors the victims of the 2016 Pulse nightclub shooting.

=== Naming rights ===
On June 4, 2019, it was announced that Exploria Resorts (a timeshare entity based in nearby Clermont) had acquired naming rights to the stadium. On January 18, 2024, Brazilian digital bank Inter&Co secured the naming rights to the stadium. On July 23, 2026, it was announced that the stadium would be renamed to Inter.co Stadium .

== International soccer matches ==
=== Men's matches ===
Date	Team #1	Result	Team #2	Competition	Attendance
October 6, 2017	United States	4–0	Panama	2018 FIFA World Cup qualification fifth round	25,303
March 21, 2019	United States	1–0	Ecuador	International friendly	17,442
November 15, 2019	United States	4–1	Canada	2019–20 CONCACAF Nations League A	13,103
January 31, 2021	United States	7–0	Trinidad and Tobago	International friendly	3,503
March 25, 2021	Canada	5–1	Bermuda	2022 FIFA World Cup qualification first round	N/A
July 12, 2021	Jamaica	2–0	Suriname	2021 CONCACAF Gold Cup Group C	6,403
July 12, 2021	Costa Rica	3–1	Guadeloupe	2021 CONCACAF Gold Cup Group C	6,403
July 16, 2021	Guadeloupe	1–2	Jamaica	2021 CONCACAF Gold Cup Group C	6,527
July 16, 2021	Suriname	1–2	Costa Rica	2021 CONCACAF Gold Cup Group C	6,527
July 20, 2021	Costa Rica	1–0	Jamaica	2021 CONCACAF Gold Cup Group C	10,264
July 20, 2021	Panama	3–1	Grenada	2021 CONCACAF Gold Cup Group D	10,264
March 27, 2022	United States	5–1	Panama	2022 FIFA World Cup qualification third round	25,022
March 27, 2023	United States	1–0	El Salvador	2022–23 CONCACAF Nations League A	18,947
June 29, 2024	Canada	0–0	Chile	2024 Copa América Group A	24,481
July 1, 2024	Bolivia	1–3	Panama	2024 Copa América Group C	16,129
January 22, 2025	United States	3–0	Costa Rica	International friendly	13,580
June 10, 2026	England	3–0	Costa Rica	International friendly	25,500
September 26, 2026	United States	4–1	Peru	International friendly	24,228

=== Women's matches ===
Date	Team #1	Result	Team #2	Competition	Attendance
March 7, 2018	France	3–0	Germany	2018 SheBelieves Cup	6,525
March 7, 2018	United States	1–0	England	2018 SheBelieves Cup	12,351
March 5, 2020	Spain	3–1	Japan	2020 SheBelieves Cup	7,528
March 5, 2020	United States	2–0	England	2020 SheBelieves Cup	16,531
January 18, 2021	United States	4–0	Colombia	International friendly	2,042
January 22, 2021	United States	6–0	Colombia	International friendly	3,202
February 18, 2021	Brazil	4–1	Argentina	2021 SheBelieves Cup	1,119
February 18, 2021	United States	1–0	Canada	2021 SheBelieves Cup	3,104
February 21, 2021	United States	2–0	Brazil	2021 SheBelieves Cup	4,000
February 21, 2021	Argentina	0–1	Canada	2021 SheBelieves Cup	1,348
February 24, 2021	Canada	0–2	Brazil	2021 SheBelieves Cup	1,409
February 24, 2021	United States	6–0	Argentina	2021 SheBelieves Cup	3,702
February 16, 2023	Japan	0–1	Brazil	2023 SheBelieves Cup	6,453
February 16, 2023	United States	2–0	Canada	2023 SheBelieves Cup	14,697
April 6, 2024	Mexico	0–1	Colombia	International friendly	
November 28, 2025	United States	3–0	Italy	International friendly	14,199

== Other notable soccer matches ==
=== CONCACAF Champions League ===
Due to the COVID-19 pandemic at the time, CONCACAF selected Exploria Stadium to host the latter stages of the delayed 2020 CONCACAF Champions League in one centralized and neutral location. With the competition paused in March at the quarter-final stage, three of the four ties had already had the first leg contested. Los Angeles FC vs Cruz Azul was the only outstanding first leg and was changed to a single-leg match as a result. All games were played behind closed doors.

Date	Team #1	Result	Team #2	Competition	Attendance
December 15, 2020	(Honduras) Olimpia	0–1 (Note: 2–2 on aggregate, Olimpia progressed on away goals rule.)	(Canada) Montreal Impact	2020 CONCACAF Champions League quarter-finals	N/A
December 15, 2020	(Mexico) Tigres	4–0 (Note: UANL won 5–0 on aggregate.)	(United States) New York City FC	2020 CONCACAF Champions League quarter-finals	N/A
December 16, 2020	(United States) Atlanta United	1–0 (Note: América won 3–1 on aggregate.)	(Mexico) América	2020 CONCACAF Champions League quarter-finals	N/A
December 16, 2020	(United States) Los Angeles FC	2–1 (Note: Single-legged tie.)	(Mexico) Cruz Azul	2020 CONCACAF Champions League quarter-finals	N/A
December 19, 2020	(Mexico) Tigres	3–0	(Honduras) Olimpia	2020 CONCACAF Champions League semi-finals	N/A
December 19, 2020	(United States) Los Angeles FC	3–1	(Mexico) América	2020 CONCACAF Champions League semi-finals	N/A
December 22, 2020	(Mexico) Tigres	2–1	(United States) Los Angeles FC	2020 CONCACAF Champions League; Final	N/A

=== 2025 FIFA Club World Cup ===
The stadium was one of twelve venues to host the 2025 FIFA Club World Cup.

Date	Time (UTC−4)	Team #1	Result	Team #2	Attendance
June 17, 2025	18:00	Ulsan HD (South Korea)	0–1	(South Africa) Mamelodi Sundowns	3,412
June 20, 2025	12:00	Benfica (Portugal)	6–0	(New Zealand) Auckland City	6,730

=== Exhibitions ===
Date	Team #1	Result	Team #2	Competition	Attendance
June 23, 2023	Team Ronaldinho	4–3	Team Roberto Carlos	The Beautiful Game	–

=== Florida Cup ===
Date	Team #1	Result	Team #2	Competition	Attendance
January 10, 2018	(Brazil) Corinthians	p 1–1	(Netherlands) PSV Eindhoven	2018 Florida Cup	–
January 11, 2018	(Brazil) Atlético Mineiro	0–1	(Scotland) Rangers	2018 Florida Cup	–
January 10, 2019	(Netherlands) Ajax	2–2 p	(Brazil) Flamengo	2019 Florida Cup	–
January 12, 2019	(Brazil) São Paulo	2–4	(Netherlands) Ajax	2019 Florida Cup	–
January 12, 2019	(Brazil) Flamengo	1–0	(Germany) Eintracht Frankfurt	2019 Florida Cup	–
January 15, 2020	(Brazil) Corinthians	2–1	(United States) New York City FC	2020 Florida Cup	–
January 15, 2020	(Brazil) Palmeiras	p 0–0	(Colombia) Atlético Nacional	2020 Florida Cup	–
January 18, 2020	(United States) New York City FC	1–2	(Brazil) Palmeiras	2020 Florida Cup	11,569
January 18, 2020	(Colombia) Atlético Nacional	2–1	(Brazil) Corinthians	2020 Florida Cup	11,569
July 20, 2022	(United States) Orlando City	1–3	(England) Arsenal	2022 Florida Cup	19,738
January 27, 2024	(United States) Orlando City	1–1	(Brazil) Flamengo	2024 Florida Cup	
January 15, 2025	(Brazil) Cruzeiro	1–1	(Brazil) São Paulo FC	2025 Florida Cup	
January 18, 2025	(Brazil) Atlético Mineiro	0–0	(Brazil) Cruzeiro	2025 Florida Cup	
January 25, 2025	(United States) Orlando City	p 0–0	(Brazil) Atlético Mineiro	2025 Florida Cup	

=== Friendlies ===
Date	Team #1	Result	Team #2	Competition	Attendance
June 28, 2019	(Mexico) Pachuca	1–2	(Colombia) Independiente Medellín	Friendly	–
January 17, 2023	(Argentina) River Plate	3–0	(Brazil) Vasco da Gama	Friendly	–
July 26, 2023	(England) Fulham	0–2	(England) Aston Villa	Premier League Summer Series	16,134

=== MLS All-Stars ===
Date	Team #1	Result	Team #2	Competition	Attendance
July 31, 2019	(United States) (Canada) MLS All-Stars	0–3	(Spain) Atlético Madrid	2019 MLS All-Star Game	25,527

=== NCAA ===
Date	Team #1	Result	Team #2	Competition	Attendance
December 3, 2017	(California) Stanford	3–2	(California) UCLA	2017 NCAA Women's College Cup Final	1,938

=== NWSL ===
Date	Team #1	Result	Team #2	Competition	Attendance
October 14, 2017	North Carolina Courage	0–1	(Oregon) Portland Thorns FC	2017 NWSL Championship	8,124

=== U.S. Open Cup ===
Date	Team #1	Result	Team #2	Competition	Attendance
September 7, 2022	(Florida) Orlando City SC	3–0	(California) Sacramento Republic FC	2022 U.S. Open Cup Final	25,527

== Other sports ==
=== Football ===
In May 2019, Cure Bowl officials announced the college football game would be moved to Exploria Stadium from Camping World Stadium. It was the stadium's first non-soccer event. It moved back to Camping World Stadium in 2020 after it was acquired by ESPN Events, but returned for two additional playings, in 2021 and 2022.

Date	Team #1	Result	Team #2	Competition	Attendance
December 21, 2019	Georgia Southern Eagles	16–23	Liberty Flames	2019 Cure Bowl	18,158
December 17, 2021	Northern Illinois Huskies	41–47	Coastal Carolina Chanticleers	2021 Cure Bowl	9,784
December 16, 2022	UTSA Roadrunners	12–18	Troy Trojans	2022 Cure Bowl	11,911

== Other events ==
=== Concerts ===
Date	Act(s)	Event	Attendance	Additional notes
September 26, 2020	Orlando Philharmonic Orchestra	Opening night of 2020–21 concert season	–	First professional orchestra to perform a full concert in a U.S. soccer stadium. Moved from Bob Carr Theater. Reduced capacity due to COVID-19 restrictions.
June 5, 2022	Disney Live Entertainment, Sara Bareilles	2022 Special Olympics USA Games opening ceremony	–	Produced by Disney Live Entertainment. Also featured the Parade of Athletes and the lighting of the Flame of Hope.

== Gallery ==
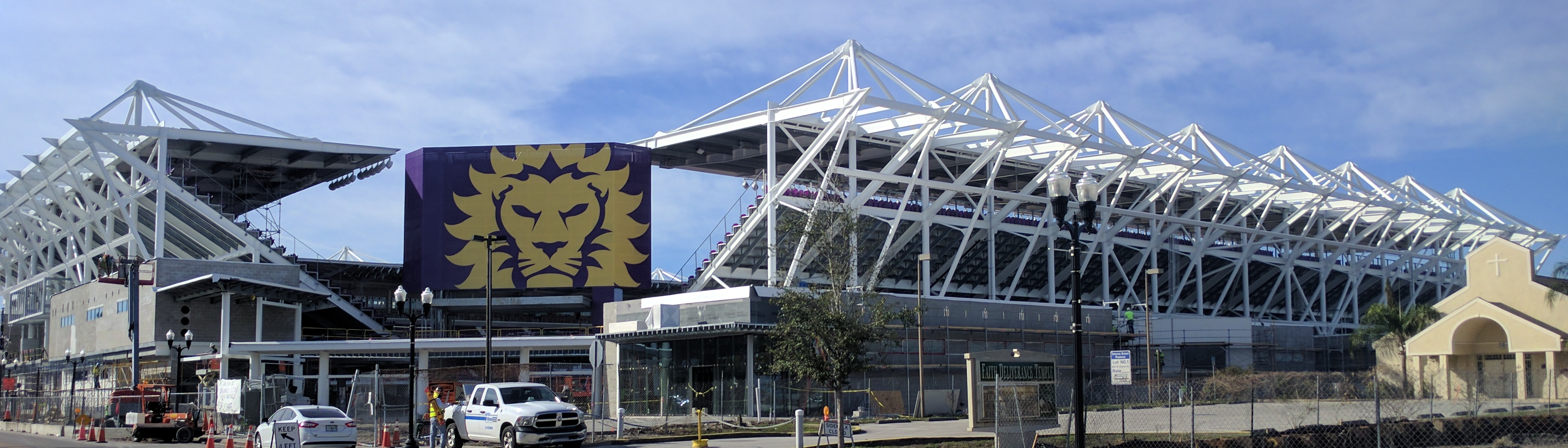
Inter.co Stadium

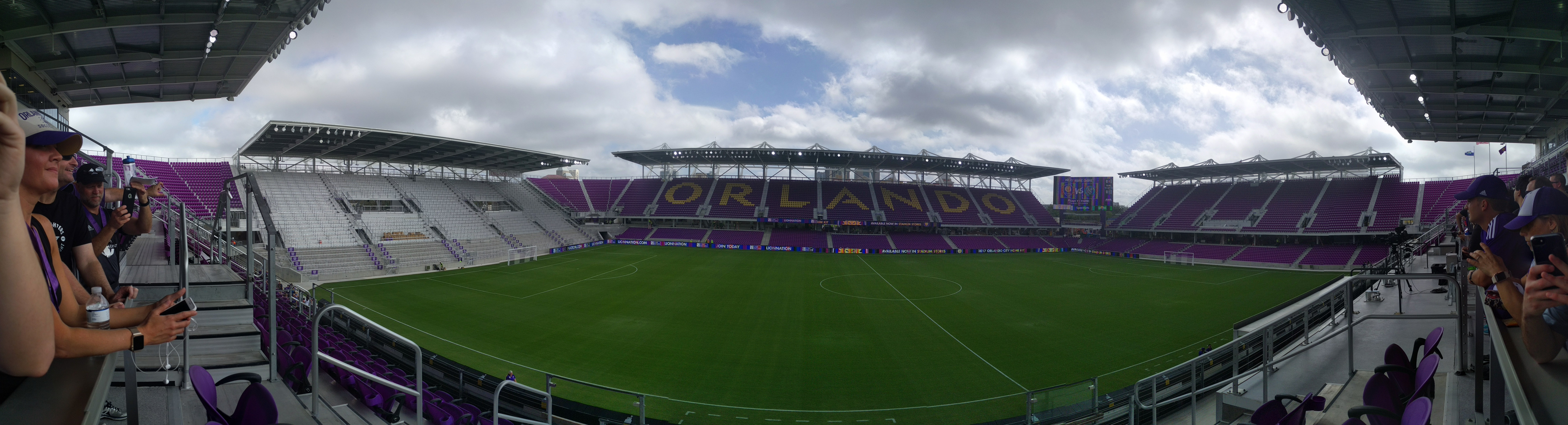
Overview of Inter.co Stadium

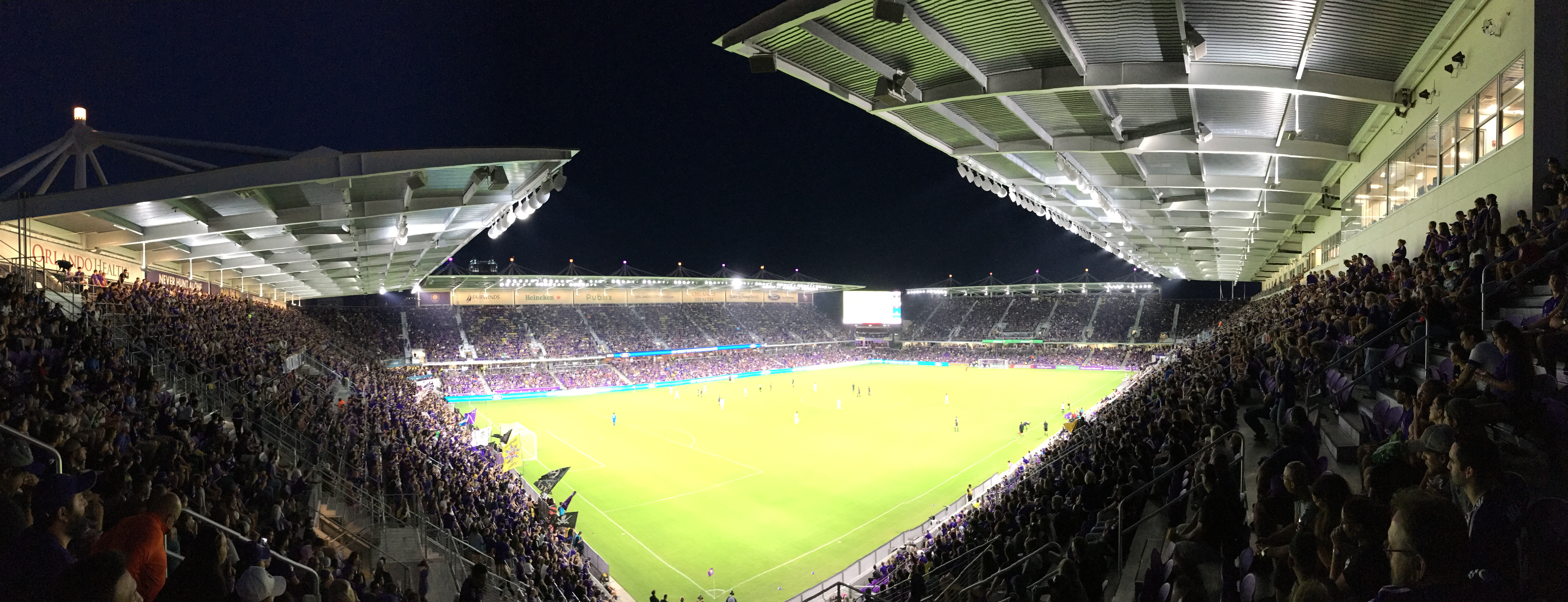
Night game at Inter.co Stadium

== See also ==
- Lists of stadiums
- List of soccer stadiums in the United States

== Notes ==
Preceded by Camping World Stadium	Home of Orlando City SC; 2017–present	Succeeded by none
Preceded by Camping World Stadium	Home of Orlando Pride; 2017–present	Succeeded by none
Preceded by Titan Soccer Complex	Home of Orlando City B 2017	Succeeded by Montverde Academy
Preceded by Avaya Stadium	Host of the NCAA Women's College Cup; 2017	Succeeded by WakeMed Soccer Park
Preceded by Mercedes-Benz Stadium	Host of the MLS All-Star Game; 2019	Succeeded by Banc of California Stadium
