= Issam El Maach =

Dutch-Moroccan footballer (born 2001)

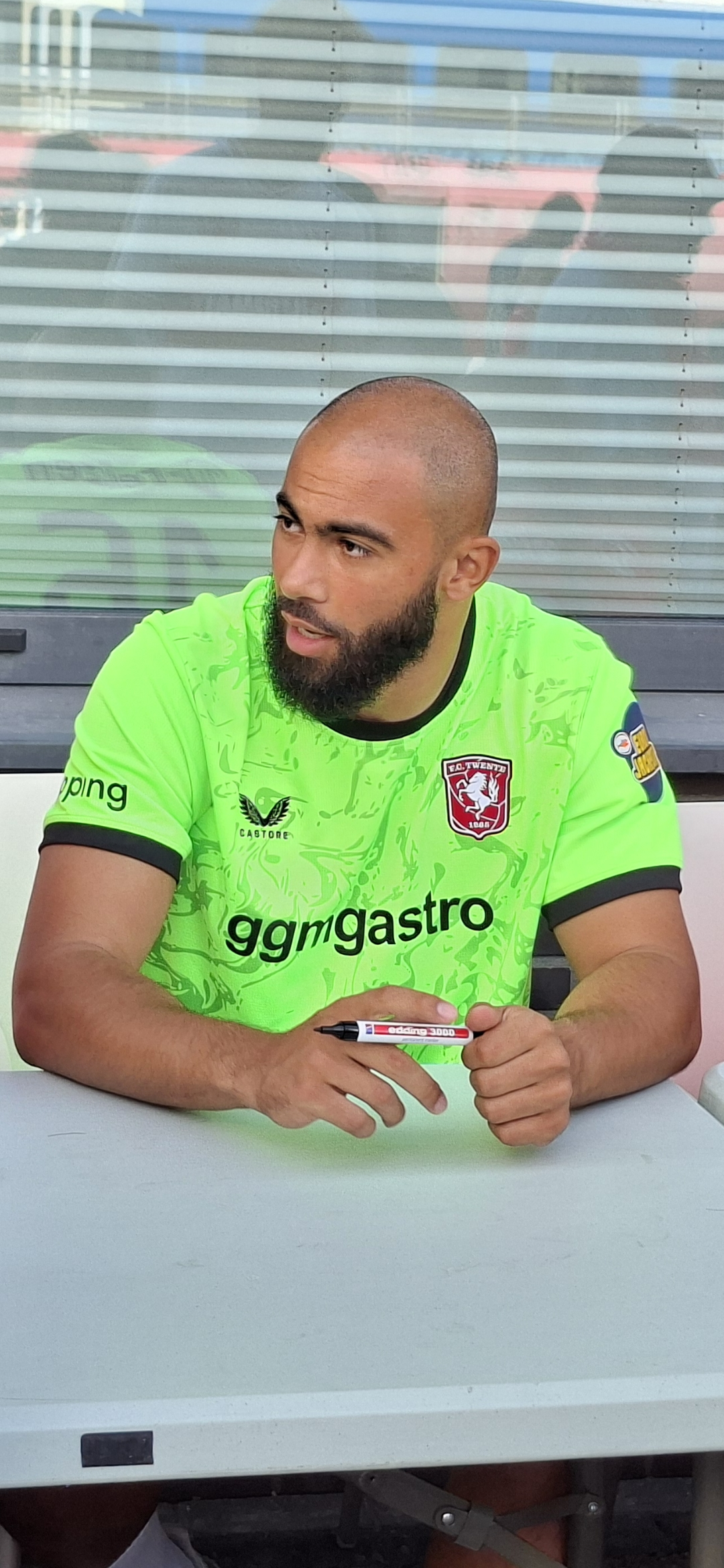
- El Maach with Twente in 2026

Personal information
- Full name: Issam El Maach
- Date of birth: 1 February 2001 (age 25)
- Place of birth: Heerlen, Netherlands
- Height: 1.87 m (6 ft 2 in)
- Position: Goalkeeper

Youth career
- RKSV MULO
- –2016: VVV-Venlo
- 2016–2017: Vitesse
- 2017–2019: Ajax

Senior career*
Years	Team	Apps	(Gls)
2018–2020	Jong Ajax	4	(0)
2018–2020	Ajax	0	(0)
2021–2022	RKC Waalwijk	1	(0)
2022–2026	Twente	0	(0)
2025	→ Roda (loan)	12	(0)

International career^{‡}
2016	Morocco U17	1	(0)
2017	Netherlands U18	1	(0)
2018	Morocco U23	1	(0)
- * Club domestic league appearances and goals as of 18 January 2026 ‡ National team caps and goals as of 17 May 2019

Issam El Maach (Arabic: عصام المعاش; born 1 February 2001) is a professional footballer who most recently played as a goalkeeper for Eredivisie club Twente. Born in the Netherlands, he represents Morocco at youth international level.

== Club career ==
=== Early career ===
Born in Heerlen and raised in Helmond to Moroccan parents, El Maach began his football career with local club RKSV MULO before being recruited to the youth ranks of VVV-Venlo.In 2016 he moved to the youth academy of SBV Vitesse, from where he was scouted and joined the Ajax Youth Academy a year later.

=== Ajax ===
El Maach signed a two-year contract with Ajax in 2017 with an option for an additional year. He made his professional debut with the reserve team Jong Ajax in the Eerste Divisie on 18 January 2018 in a 4–1 loss to RKC Waalwijk. Jong Ajax ended the season as champions of the second division, becoming the first reserve team to win a championship since the introduction of reserve teams in professional football in the Netherlands.

He made his first team debut on 11 January 2019 in a friendly game against Brazilian club Flamengo in the Florida Cup.

On 26 June 2020, it was announced that El Maach's contract was not going to be extended, leaving him eligible to find a new club.

=== RKC Waalwijk ===
On 14 July 2021, El Maach signed a one-year contract with Eredivisie club RKC Waalwijk.

=== Twente ===
On 25 July 2022, El Maach joined Twente on a two-year deal, with an option for an additional year.

On 7 January 2025, he joined Roda JC on loan for the remainder of the 2024–25 season. He made 12 appearances during his loan spell before returning to Twente in July 2025 after the club exercised their option to extend his contract through to 2026.

On 2 September 2026, El Maach agreed to part ways with Twente with immediate effect.

=== HJK Helsinki (trial) ===
On 20 January 2026, Finnish club HJK Helsinki announced that El Maach had joined the team on a trial basis. He featured for the club on the same day in a 2026 Liigacup match against IFK Mariehamn.

== International career ==
El Maach is a youth international for Morocco, having represented the nation at under-17 and under-23 levels. He also made one appearance for the Netherlands U18s in a friendly match in 2017.

== Honours ==
Jong Ajax

- Eerste Divisie: 2017–18

Ajax

- KNVB Cup: 2018–19
- Florida Cup runners-up: 2019
