= 2023 Florida Cup =

Ninth edition of Florida Cup

Tournament details
- Host country: United States
- Dates: July 19 – August 2
- Teams: 4 (from 1 confederation)
- Venues: 2 (in 2 host cities)

Final positions
- Champions: (England) Chelsea (1st title)
- Runners-up: (Wales) Wrexham

Tournament statistics
- Matches played: 2
- Goals scored: 9 (4.5 per match)
- Top scorer(s): (Netherlands) Ian Maatsen (Chelsea) (2 goals)

The 2023 Florida Cup was the ninth edition of the Florida Cup, an annual series of friendly association football events in the United States. The 2023 program combined three separately billed preseason matches held between July 19 and August 2. Chelsea played Wrexham in an FC Series match in Chapel Hill, North Carolina. Aston Villa faced Fulham in the Orlando leg of the Premier League Summer Series, which was also included in the FC Series schedule, and Juventus played Real Madrid in an Orlando match on the Soccer Champions Tour hosted by the Florida Cup.

Chelsea defeated Wrexham 5–0, Aston Villa beat Fulham 2–0, and Juventus defeated Real Madrid 3–1.

== Background ==
The Chelsea-Wrexham fixture was announced in April 2023 as the first international soccer match to be held at Kenan Memorial Stadium. It was also the clubs' first meeting at a neutral venue and their first match against each other since 1984. Tickets sold out within several days. Local tourism officials estimated before the match that approximately 50,000 visitors would come to Chapel Hill and neighboring Carrboro, generating about $1.1 million in local spending.

Kenan Stadium ordinarily had an artificial playing surface. Organizers therefore installed a temporary natural-grass field for the match. The game opened Wrexham's four-match preseason tour of the United States following the club's promotion to EFL League Two.

The July 26 match between Aston Villa and Fulham was the Orlando fixture of the inaugural Premier League Summer Series and was also included in the FC Series program.

The Juventus–Real Madrid fixture was announced on May 12 as the Orlando stop of the Soccer Champions Tour. It was hosted by the Florida Cup and marked the first appearance by either club at Camping World Stadium. Contemporary coverage described it as the 25th meeting between the teams.

== Teams ==
=== FC Series ===
Nation	Team	Location	Confederation	League
England	Chelsea	London	UEFA	Premier League
Wales	Wrexham	Wrexham	UEFA	EFL League Two (Note: Wrexham were promoted from the National League following the 2022–23 season.)

=== Soccer Champions Tour hosted by Florida Cup ===
Nation	Team	Location	Confederation	League
Italy	Juventus	Turin	UEFA	Serie A
Spain	Real Madrid	Madrid	UEFA	La Liga

== Venues ==
Chapel Hill, North Carolina	Orlando, Florida
Kenan Memorial Stadium	Camping World Stadium
Capacity: 50,500	Capacity: 65,000
Location of the host cities of the 2023 Florida Cup.

== Matches ==
19 July 2023
19:30 EDT
FC Series

Chelsea (England)	5–0	(Wales) Wrexham
Maatsen 3', 42'; Gallagher 80'; Nkunku 90'; Chilwell 90+3'	Report

Kenan Memorial Stadium, Chapel Hill, North Carolina
Attendance: 50,596

2 August 2023
19:30 EDT
Soccer Champions Tour

Juventus (Italy)	3–1	(Spain) Real Madrid
Kean 1'; Weah 20'; Vlahović 90+5'	Report	Vinícius 38'

Camping World Stadium, Orlando, Florida
Attendance: 63,503
Referee: Ismail Elfath (United States)
