= 2020 Florida Cup =

Sixth edition of Florida Cup

Tournament details
- Host country: United States
- Dates: January 15 – 18
- Teams: 4 (from 2 confederations)
- Venue: 1 (in 1 host city)

Final positions
- Champions: (Brazil) Palmeiras (1st title)
- Runners-up: (Colombia) Atlético Nacional

Tournament statistics
- Matches played: 4
- Goals scored: 9 (2.25 per match)

The 2020 Florida Cup was the sixth edition of Florida Cup, a friendly association football tournament played in the United States. It was contested from January 15 to 18, and was won by Palmeiras in their first participation. The competition was partnered with Universal Orlando Resort and Adidas.

== Teams ==
Nation	Team	Location	Confederation	League
Brazil	Palmeiras	São Paulo	CONMEBOL	Campeonato Brasileiro Série A
Colombia	Atlético Nacional	Medellín	CONMEBOL	Categoría Primera A
Brazil	Corinthians	São Paulo	CONMEBOL	Campeonato Brasileiro Série A
United States	New York City FC	New York City	CONCACAF	Major League Soccer

== Venues ==
Orlando
Exploria Stadium
Capacity: 25,500
Location of Florida in the United States.	Location of the host city of the 2020 Florida Cup in Florida.

== Standings ==
Pos	Team	Pld	W	PW	PL	L	GF	GA	GD	Pts
1	(Brazil) Palmeiras (C)	2	1	1	0	0	2	1	+1	5
2	(Colombia) Atlético Nacional	2	1	0	1	0	2	1	+1	4
3	(Brazil) Corinthians	2	1	0	0	1	3	3	0	3
4	(United States) New York City FC	2	0	0	0	2	2	4	−2	0

Source: Florida Cup
Rules for classification: 1) Points; 2) Wins; 3) Goal differential; 4) Goals scored; 5) Head-to-head result; 6) Disciplinary points.
(C) Champion

== Matches ==
January 15, 2020
18:00 EST (UTC−5)

Corinthians (Brazil)	2–1	(United States) New York City FC
Luan 11', 30'	Report	Méndez 75' (o.g.)

Exploria Stadium, Orlando
Referee: Jonathan Bilinski (United States)

January 15, 2020
20:30 EST (UTC−5)

Palmeiras (Brazil)	0–0	(Colombia) Atlético Nacional
	Report
Penalties
Victor Luis (penalty scored); Luan (penalty scored); Alanzinho (penalty scored); G. Menino (penalty scored); Willian (penalty scored); Emerson (penalty scored); Wesley (penalty scored); Ramires (penalty scored); Mayke (penalty scored); Veron (penalty scored)	10–9	(penalty scored) Duque; (penalty scored) Candelo; (penalty scored) Quiñones; (penalty scored) Rovira; (penalty scored) Barrera; (penalty scored) Blanco; (penalty scored) Yabur; (penalty scored) Córdoba; (penalty scored) Cuadrado; (penalty missed) Velásquez

Exploria Stadium, Orlando
Referee: Elvis Osmanovic (United States)

January 18, 2020
14:00 EST (UTC−5)

New York City FC (United States)	1–2	(Brazil) Palmeiras
De Rosario 45+2'	Report	Lucas Lima 56'; Willian 73'

Exploria Stadium, Orlando
Referee: Jonathan Bilinski (United States)

January 18, 2020
17:30 EST (UTC−5)

Atlético Nacional (Colombia)	2–1	(Brazil) Corinthians
Torres 44'; Gómez 83'	Report	Ramiro 7'

Exploria Stadium, Orlando
Referee: Matthew Miscannon (United States)
