= 2016 Florida Cup =

Tournament details
- Host country: United States
- Dates: January 10 – 20
- Teams: 9 (from 3 confederations)
- Venue: 3 (in 3 host cities)

Final positions
- Champions: (Brazil) Atlético Mineiro (1st title)

Tournament statistics
- Matches played: 9
- Goals scored: 24 (2.67 per match)
- Top scorer(s): (Mexico) Javier Hernández (Brazil) Eduardo Sasha (Paraguay) Angel Romero (2 goals each)
- Best player: (Mexico) Javier Hernández

The 2016 Florida Cup was a friendly association football tournament played in the United States. It was the second edition of the competition, which included teams from Brazil, Colombia, Ukraine, Germany and the United States. Atlético Mineiro were crowned champions for the first time.

== Teams ==
| Nation | Team | Location | Confederation | League |
|---|---|---|---|---|
| Germany | Schalke 04 | Gelsenkirchen | UEFA | Bundesliga |
| Germany | Bayer Leverkusen | Leverkusen | UEFA | Bundesliga |
| Ukraine | Shakhtar Donetsk | Donetsk | UEFA | Ukrainian Premier League |
| Brazil | Corinthians | São Paulo | CONMEBOL | Campeonato Brasileiro Série A |
| Brazil | Fluminense | Rio de Janeiro | CONMEBOL | Campeonato Brasileiro Série A |
| Brazil | Atlético Mineiro | Belo Horizonte | CONMEBOL | Campeonato Brasileiro Série A |
| Brazil | Internacional | Porto Alegre | CONMEBOL | Campeonato Brasileiro Série A |
| Colombia | Santa Fe | Bogotá | CONMEBOL | Categoría Primera A |
| United States | Fort Lauderdale Strikers | Fort Lauderdale | CONCACAF | North American Soccer League |

== Venues ==
| Bay Lake | Fort Lauderdale | Boca Raton |
|---|---|---|
| ESPN Wide World of Sports Complex | Lockhart Stadium | FAU Stadium |
| 28°20′13.5″N 81°33′21.6″W | 26°11′35″N 80°9′40″W | 26°22′31″N 80°6′1″W |
| Capacity: 9,500 | Capacity: 20,450 | Capacity: 29,419 |
| Location of Florida in the United States. | | Location of the host cities of the 2016 Florida Cup in Florida. |

== Matches ==
January 10
17:00 EST (UTC-5)

| Bayer Leverkusen (Germany) | 1–0 | (Colombia) Santa Fe |
|---|---|---|
| Kießling 87' | Report |

ESPN Wide World of Sports Complex, Bay Lake
January 10
19:30 EST (UTC-5)

| Fort Lauderdale Strikers (United States) | 0–2 | (Germany) Schalke 04 |
|---|---|---|
| | Report | Di Santo 29'; Sané 57' |

ESPN Wide World of Sports Complex, Bay Lake
Attendance: 1,104
Referee: Daniel Fitzgerald (United States)

January 13
18:30 EST (UTC-5)

| Schalke 04 (Germany) | 0–3 | (Brazil) Atlético Mineiro |
|---|---|---|
| | Report | Leonardo Silva 8'; Patric 81'; Lucas Cândido 83' |

Lockhart Stadium, Fort Lauderdale
Attendance: 2,504
Referee: Ted Unkel (United States)
January 13
20:30 EST (UTC-5)

| Internacional (Brazil) | 3–3 | (Germany) Bayer Leverkusen |
|---|---|---|
| Sasha 1'; D'Alessandro 6' (pen.); Andrigo 62' | Report | Hernández 40' (pen.), 45+1'; Alan 79' (o.g.) |

ESPN Wide World of Sports Complex, Bay Lake
Referee: Nima Saghafi (United States)

January 17
14:00 EST (UTC-5)

| Shakhtar Donetsk (Ukraine) | 1–1 | (Brazil) Fluminense |
|---|---|---|
| Ferreyra 48' | Report | Magno Alves 82' |

ESPN Wide World of Sports Complex, Bay Lake
Referee: Kevin Terry Júnior (United States)
January 17
14:00 EST (UTC-5)

| Atlético Mineiro (Brazil) | 1–0 | (Brazil) Corinthians |
|---|---|---|
| Hyuri 57' | Report |

FAU Stadium, Boca Raton
Referee: Marcos Olveira (Brazil)
January 17
16:30 EST (UTC-5)

| Santa Fe (Colombia) | 2–1 | (United States) Fort Lauderdale Strikers |
|---|---|---|
| Zapata 3' (pen.); Balanta 33' | Report | PC 80' |

FAU Stadium, Boca Raton
Referee: Rubiel Vazquez (United States)

January 20
18:45 EST (UTC-5)

| Corinthians (Brazil) | 3–2 | (Ukraine) Shakhtar Donetsk |
|---|---|---|
| Danilo 12'; Romero 35', 43' | Report | Taison 22'; Kovalenko 80' |

ESPN Wide World of Sports Complex, Bay Lake
Referee: Guido Gonzales Jr. (United States)
January 20
18:45 EST (UTC-5)

| Fluminense (Brazil) | 0–1 | (Brazil) Internacional |
|---|---|---|
| | Report | Sasha 37' |

Lockhart Stadium, Fort Lauderdale
Referee: Ted Unkel (United States)

== Table ==
| Pos. | Team | Pld | W | D | L | GF | GA | GD | Pts |
|---|---|---|---|---|---|---|---|---|---|
| 1 | (Brazil) Atlético Mineiro | 2 | 2 | 0 | 0 | 4 | 0 | +4 | 6 |
| 2 | (Germany) Bayer Leverkusen | 2 | 1 | 1 | 0 | 4 | 3 | +1 | 4 |
| 3 | (Brazil) Internacional | 2 | 1 | 1 | 0 | 4 | 3 | +1 | 4 |
| 4 | (Brazil) Corinthians | 2 | 1 | 0 | 1 | 3 | 3 | 0 | 3 |
| 5 | (Colombia) Santa Fe | 2 | 1 | 0 | 1 | 2 | 2 | 0 | 3 |
| 6 | (Germany) Schalke 04 | 2 | 1 | 0 | 1 | 2 | 3 | −1 | 3 |
| 7 | (Ukraine) Shakhtar Donetsk | 2 | 0 | 1 | 1 | 3 | 4 | −1 | 1 |
| 8 | (Brazil) Fluminense | 2 | 0 | 1 | 1 | 1 | 2 | −1 | 1 |
| 9 | (United States) Fort Lauderdale Strikers | 2 | 0 | 0 | 2 | 1 | 4 | −3 | 0 |

== Broadcasting rights ==
The tournament will be broadcast in 144 countries.

| Country | Broadcaster |
|---|---|
| Sub-Saharan Africa | StarSat |
| Brazil | Rede Globo (only Shakhtar Donetsk vs. Fluminense and Atlético Mineiro vs. Corinthians); SporTV |
| Colombia | RCN Televisión; Win Sports |
| Germany | Eurosport |
| Mexico | Fox Sports |
| United States | ESPN Deportes |
