= 2018 Florida Cup =

Tournament details
- Host country: United States
- Dates: January 10 – 20
- Teams: 8 (from 2 confederations)
- Venues: 4 (in 3 host cities)

Final positions
- Champions: (Colombia) Atlético Nacional (1st title)

Tournament statistics
- Matches played: 8
- Goals scored: 24 (3 per match)
- Top scorers: Jonathan Betancourt (Barcelona S.C.); Sam Lammers (PSV Eindhoven); Alfredo Morelos (Rangers); Aldo Leão Ramírez (Atlético Nacional); Rodriguinho (Corinthians); (2 goals)

The 2018 Florida Cup was the fourth edition of Florida Cup, a friendly association football tournament played in the United States. The competition partnered with Universal Orlando Resort for the first time. The resort hosted several events including the Florida Cup Fan Fest on January 13 and 14.

The tournament was won by Atlético Nacional on goal difference ahead of Barcelona S.C. and Rangers, with Barcelona finishing second on goals scored.

== Teams ==
Nation	Team	Location	Confederation	League
Brazil	Atlético Mineiro	Belo Horizonte	CONMEBOL	Campeonato Brasileiro Série A
Brazil	Corinthians	São Paulo	CONMEBOL	Campeonato Brasileiro Série A
Brazil	Fluminense	Rio de Janeiro	CONMEBOL	Campeonato Brasileiro Série A
Colombia	Atlético Nacional	Medellín	CONMEBOL	Categoría Primera A
Ecuador	Barcelona S.C.	Guayaquil	CONMEBOL	Campeonato Ecuatoriano de Fútbol Serie A
Netherlands	PSV Eindhoven	Eindhoven	UEFA	Eredivisie
Poland	Legia Warsaw	Warsaw	UEFA	Ekstraklasa
Scotland	Rangers	Glasgow	UEFA	Scottish Premiership

== Venues ==
Orlando
Orlando City Stadium	Spectrum Stadium
Capacity: 25,500	Capacity: 44,206
Location of Florida in the United States.	Location of the host cities of the 2018 Florida Cup in Florida.
Lauderhill	St. Petersburg
Central Broward Stadium	Al Lang Stadium
Capacity: 25,000	Capacity: 7,227

== Standings ==
Pos	Team	Pld	W	PW	PL	L	GF	GA	GD	Pts	
1	(Colombia) Atlético Nacional	2	2	0	0	0	4	0	+4	6	Florida Cup winners
2	(Ecuador) Barcelona S.C.	2	2	0	0	0	6	3	+3	6	
3	(Scotland) Rangers	2	2	0	0	0	5	2	+3	6	
4	(Netherlands) PSV Eindhoven	2	0	1	1	0	2	2	0	3	
5	(Brazil) Corinthians	2	0	1	0	1	3	5	−2	2	
6	(Brazil) Fluminense	2	0	0	1	1	2	4	−2	1	
7	(Poland) Legia Warsaw	2	0	0	0	2	2	5	−3	0	
8	(Brazil) Atlético Mineiro	2	0	0	0	2	0	3	−3	0	

Source: Florida Cup
Rules for classification: 1) Points; 2) Wins; 3) Goal difference; 4) Goals scored; 5) Goals against.

== Matches ==
January 10, 2018
19:00 EST (UTC−5)

Corinthians (Brazil)	1–1	(Netherlands) PSV Eindhoven
Rodriguinho 23'	Report	Lammers 90+3'
Penalties
Junior Dutra (penalty scored); Bastos (penalty scored); Maycon (penalty scored); Camacho (penalty scored); Giovanni Augusto (penalty scored)	5–4	(penalty scored) Maher; (penalty scored) Schwaab; (penalty missed) Lammers; (penalty scored) Arias; (penalty scored) Malen

Orlando City Stadium, Orlando
Referee: Jonathan Bilinski

January 11, 2018
19:00 EST (UTC−5)

Atlético Mineiro (Brazil)	0–1	(Scotland) Rangers
	Report	Windass 68'

Orlando City Stadium, Orlando
Referee: Andrew Musashe

January 12, 2018
19:00 EST (UTC−5)

PSV Eindhoven (Netherlands)	1–1	(Brazil) Fluminense
Lammers 41'	Report	Robinho 90+2'
Penalties
Lozano (penalty scored); Obispo (penalty scored); Hendrix (penalty scored); Malen (penalty scored); Pereiro (penalty scored)	5–4	(penalty scored) Robinho; (penalty scored) Pedro; (penalty scored) Jadson; (penalty missed) Romarinho; (penalty scored) Chaves

Spectrum Stadium, Orlando
Referee: Esteban Rosano

January 13, 2018
13:00 EST (UTC−5)

Rangers (Scotland)	4–2	(Brazil) Corinthians
Morelos 63', 77'; Halliday 71'; Tavernier 82'	Report	Rodriguinho 31'; Kazim 40'

Spectrum Stadium, Orlando
Referee: Jonathan Bilinski

January 13, 2018
15:00 EST (UTC−5)

Barcelona S.C. (Ecuador)	3–2	(Poland) Legia Warsaw
M. Caicedo 18'; Nahuelpán 21'; Esterilla 27'	Report	Niezgoda 7'; Rémy 90'

Central Broward Stadium, Lauderhill
Referee: Andres Pfefferkorn

January 14, 2018
13:00 EST (UTC−5)

Atlético Nacional (Colombia)	2–0	(Brazil) Atlético Mineiro
Rentería 38'; Lucumí 71'	Report

Spectrum Stadium, Orlando
Referee: Brandon Artis

January 15, 2018
16:00 EST (UTC−5)

Fluminense (Brazil)	1–3	(Ecuador) Barcelona S.C.
Marcos Júnior 23'	Report	Betancourt 57', 64'; E. Castillo 90+4'

Spectrum Stadium, Orlando
Referee: Andrew Musashe

January 20, 2018
18:00 EST (UTC−5)

Legia Warsaw (Poland)	0–2	(Colombia) Atlético Nacional
	Report	Ramírez 36', 42'

Al Lang Stadium, St. Petersburg
Referee: Guido Gonzalez Jr.
