= Kenan Stadium =

Stadium at the University of North Carolina

Chris Smith Field at Kenan Stadium
- Kenan
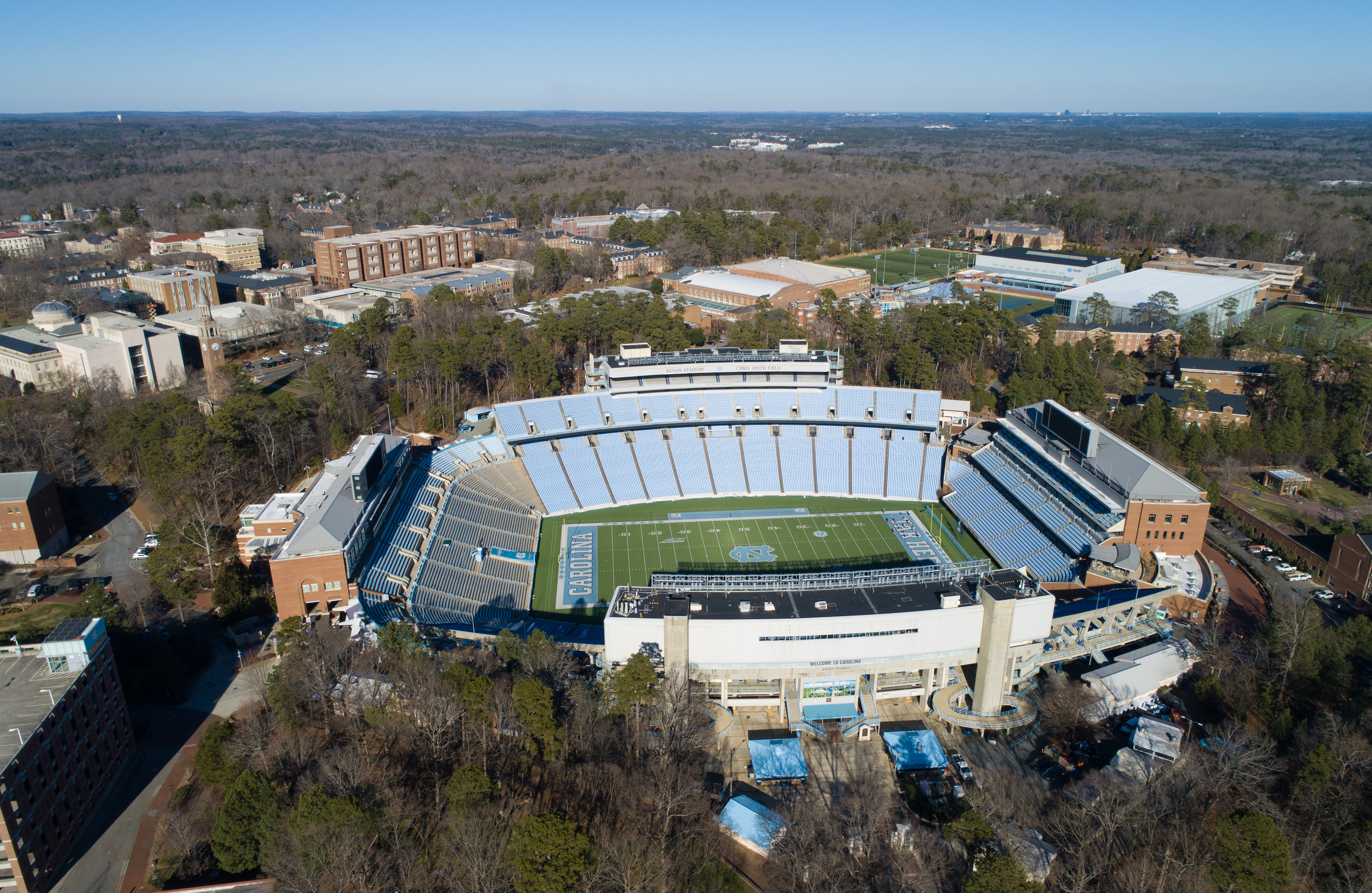
- Aerial view of stadium in 2025

- Location in North Carolina Location in the United States
- Location: 78 Stadium Drive, Chapel Hill, NC 27514
- Coordinates: 35°54′25″N 79°2′52″W
- Owner: University of North Carolina
- Operator: University of North Carolina
- Capacity: 50,500 (2018–present) Former capacity: List: 24,000 (1927–1962, expandable to 40,000); 48,000 (1963–1978); 50,000 (1979–1987); 52,000 (1988–1995); 48,500 (1996); 57,500 (1997); 60,000 (1998–2010); 62,980 (2011–2016); 62,562 (2017); 50,500 (2018–current)
- Surface: Grass (1927–2018); RootZone 3D Blend AstroTurf (2019–2024); Natural Grass (2025-present)
- Field size: 360 ft × 160 ft (110 m × 49 m)

Construction
- Groundbreaking: December 1926
- Built: 1926–1927
- Opened: November 12, 1927; 98 years ago
- Renovated: 1995–98, 2003, 2007, 2010–11, 2016, 2018, 2020
- Expanded: 1963, 1979, 1987–88, 1995–98, 2010–11
- Cost: $303,000 ($5.62 million in 2025 dollars)
- Architects: Atwood & Nash; Corley Redfoot Architects, Inc. (renovations 1987–present)
- Structural engineer: LHC Structural Engineers (renovations 1979–present)
- General contractors: TC Thompson & Co.

Tenants
- North Carolina Tar Heels (NCAA); Football (NCAA) (1927–present)

Website
- goheels.com/kenanstadium

Kenan Stadium (formerly Kenan Memorial Stadium) is a college football stadium located on Stadium Drive in Chapel Hill, North Carolina. Opened in 1927, it is home to the University of North Carolina at Chapel Hill's (UNC) football team, which competes in the Atlantic Coast Conference. The facility replaced Emerson Field, where the school's football program had been based since 1916. Plans for the stadium began as attendance increased. Ground was broken on the stadium in December 1926 and work completed in August 1927. The stadium hosted its first game on November 12, 1927, when the Tar Heels faced the Davidson Wildcats, where the Tar Heels won 27–0 in front of 9,000 spectators. On November 24, 1927, the stadium was officially opened and dedicated during a game where the Tar Heels hosted the Virginia Cavaliers and won 14–13.

== Background and construction ==
=== Planning and fundraising ===
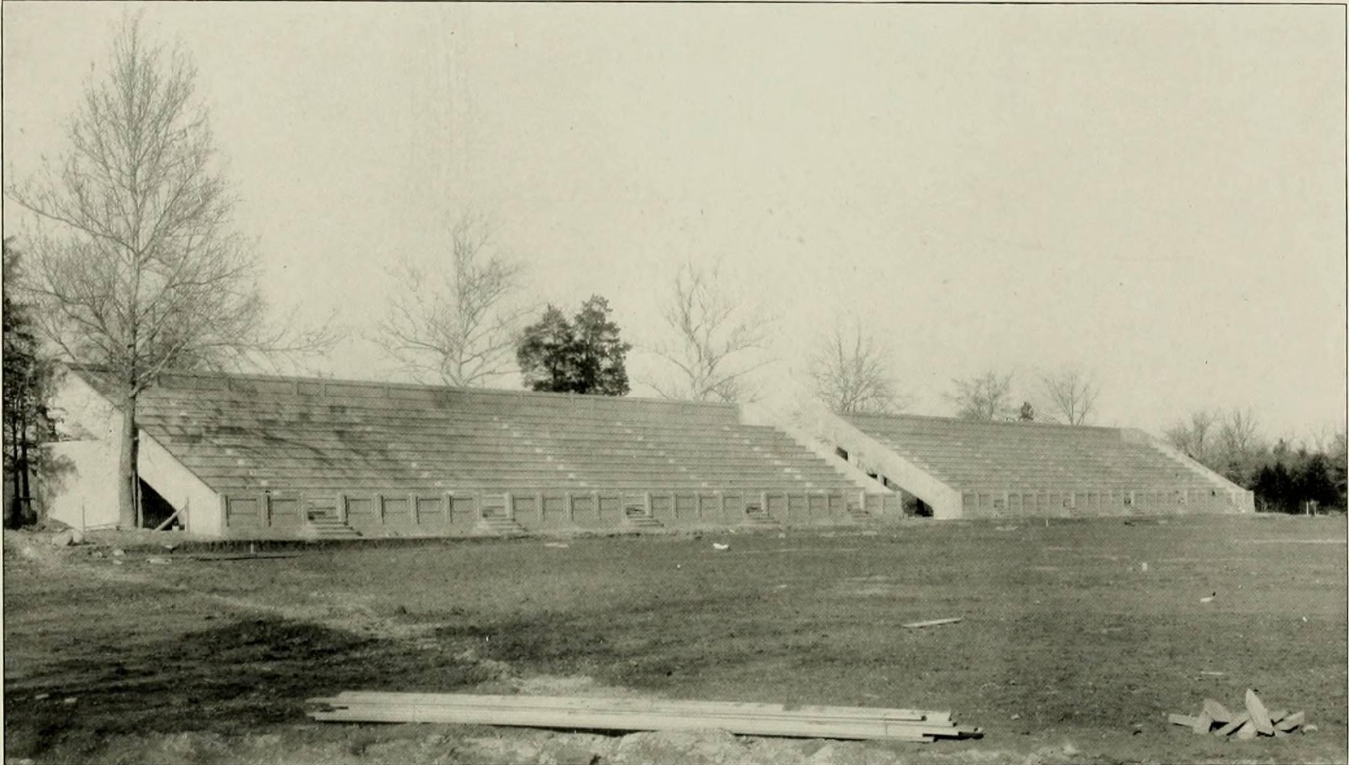
Emerson Field (pictured in 1915 or 1916) the original home of the North Carolina Tar Heels football team.

The North Carolina football team had been playing in Emerson Field since 1916 and by the mid-1920s the stadium, which sat 2,400 was too small for demand. When the school played their annual rivalry game against Virginia in 1925, 16,000 fans stood on the sideline or sat in wooden bleachers which were not "favorably situated" to view the game. The issue was so great for some fans that they refused to attend any more football games in Chapel Hill until the seating issue was resolved. Captain Isaac Edward Emerson, who was now living in Baltimore, Maryland, offered in late 1925 to give $22,000 to improve Emerson Field. The Winston-Salem Journal wrote that the stadium was needed for increasing attendance demand, hosting intramurals, and "the need of the state for a convocation place for large gatherings." At the time the stadium could not seat the entire student body and had the smallest stadium of all regional schools for those with "similar importance." Interest was growing for students to attend athletic events at the time. In addition, the school desired to schedule larger Southern institutions like Alabama, Georgia, and Tulane, among others. At the time larger schools avoided playing smaller schools since the gate receipts were split between teams. Larger teams would avoid smaller schools since they could not afford the difference in gate receipt revenue.

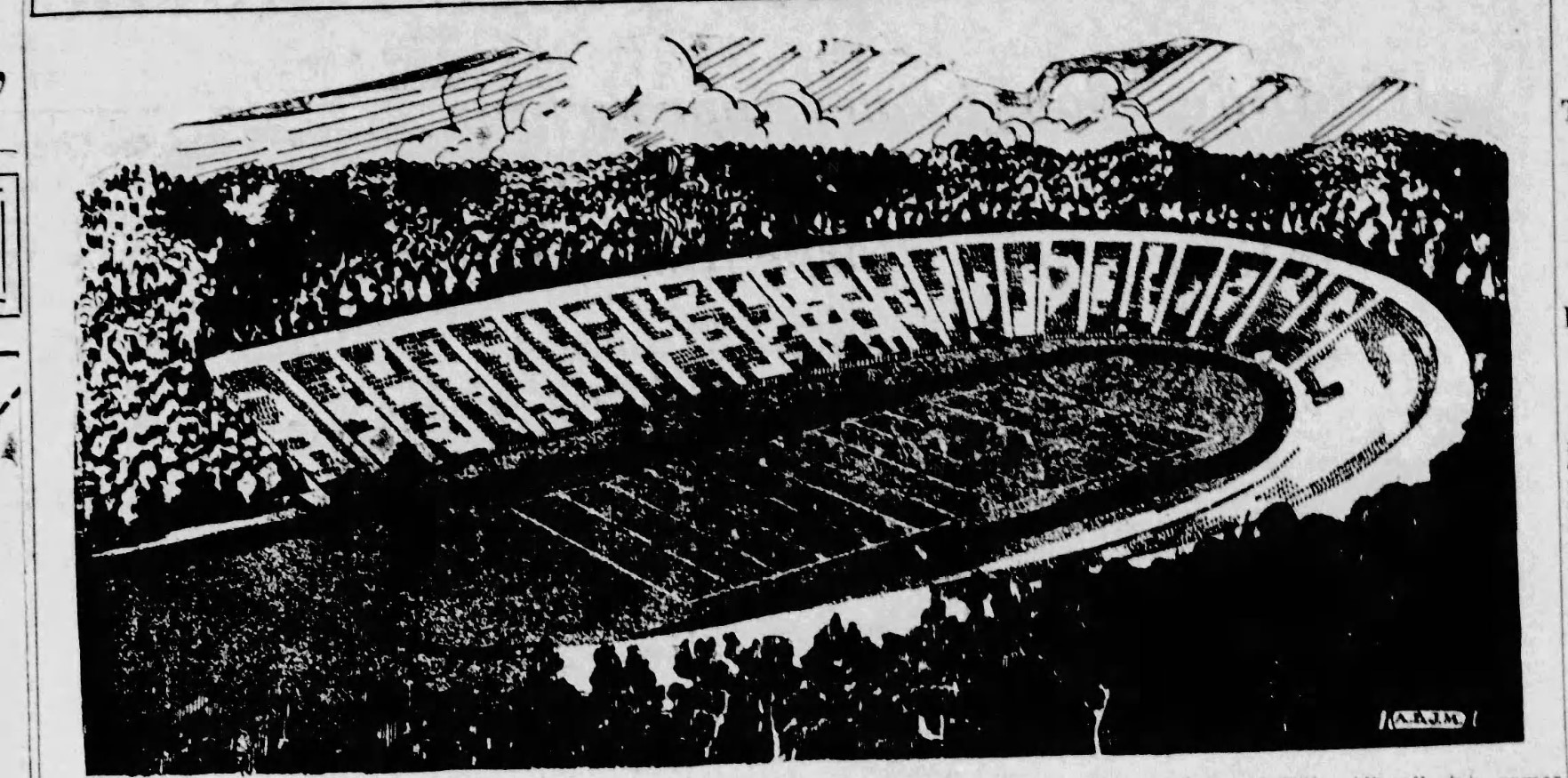
A drawing of a potential look for the new football stadium for University of North Carolina

A meeting was held at Washington Duke Hotel in Durham, North Carolina on Monday May 24, 1926 to start a fundraising drive to raise money for a new stadium that North Carolina was in "dire need" of to host its athletic events. The meeting led to the creation of the Durham Stadium Committee and a sub-committee whose goal was to determine the exact needs for the school and to prepare a report to deliver to a general alumni meeting that will be held at the same hotel on June 4 at noon, with lunch to follow. It was hoped that the meeting would be largely attended since commencement was to happen around it. In the days preceding the meeting, the stadium plans were rumored to cost around $500,000 and the stadium was planned to seat 35,000 people in a horseshoe shaped venue that was immediately south of Emerson Field in a natural amphitheater. The plans were readily accepted by the General Alumni Association and Alumni Monogram Club and the meeting confirmed the estimated cost of $500,000, but the seating capacity was estimated to be around 33,500 with an ability to later increase capacity to 55,500. The goal was to have the stadium completed by the North Carolina–Virginia game in 1927 on Thanksgiving Day. Work on the stadium was to begin once funds were properly secured. Within the first couple days of the plans announced, two people had pledged $5,000 each to the cause and it was thought Emerson would contribute what he offered in 1925.

The committee decided to allocate 2,500 seats on either side of the stadium around the 50 yard line to be sold to persons willing to donate $100 per seat and receive the seat of choice for 10 years. Three tiers of donation levels were created: donors giving between $100 and $1000 would be known as "Subscribers", those giving between $1,000 and $5,000 would be "Donors," and those giving above $5,000 would be called "Founders." Any "Founder" would have their name placed on to a bronze tablet in the stadium. All other donors would get their names placed on plaques with other similar donation levels.

On November 13, 1926, 1894 graduate William R. Kenan Jr. donated $275,000 to build a new football stadium on campus in a meeting with then school president Harry Woodburn Chase, Charles T. Woollen, and two members of the fundraising team organized to run a campaign to fund the stadium. While at North Carolina, Kenan played for the baseball team all four years and the football team for two. Kenan performed research in the summer with Professor Francis Preston Venable where the two, along with other students, discovered calcium carbide's formula and how to make acetylene gas from it. At the time of donation, Kenan was a chemical and electrical engineer in New York City and president of the Florida East Coast Railway. He made the donation in memory of his parents Mary Hargrave and William Rand Kenan for the stadium to be called Kenan Memorial Stadium. With Kenan's donation, the fundraising campaign was now unnecessary. When the donation was made, the exact location of the stadium had not been determined. The stadium was to feature 12,000 seats on each side, to seat 24,000 in total. The endzones were to have no seats in order to have no bad seats and allow air to pass through the field. A quarter-mile "cinder track" around the field was planned to be used to host the school's track and field events. In addition, the stadium will host band concerts, commencement, and other attractions. The Tar Heel wrote that donations had been progressing and Kenan's donation ended the campaign, which was great as the stadium could be finished "in ten months instead of perhaps two or three years." Work was to begin soon after the donation. In honor of Kenan's donation, the school annual Yackety Yack in 1927 was dedicated to Kenan.

There will be some, of course, who will say that Mr. Kenan might have given his money for this and that, but no one will argue that, among the things that cannot be obtained through the use of funds appropriated by the Legislature, anything is more badly needed than a stadium that will seat comfortable the large crowds that come to Chapel Hill for the big games.

— The Tar Heel in a column on November 16, 1927 commenting on Kenan's donation

After Kenan's donation, there was still no decision over where the exact location of the stadium would be. The Board of Trustees committee on buildings planned to meet on Monday November 29, 1926 to determine the location. The location south of campus at the time, a ravine, was highly thought to be the location of choice. It was believed by building in this location would cheapen the construction costs compared to building it on a level ground. The location is covered with dense woods, so clearing the landing will be the first part. It was believed that there still would be several trees that would be left around the stadium, which would allow for some beautiful sights with the changing of the leaves colors. The trees cut were to be fed into the saw mill to provide planks for seating. A steam shovel located in Carrboro, North Carolina was at the ready to be used once the land was cleared. Engineers in the planning phase felt the whole process would take ten months.

The committee met on the 29th, but adjourned the meeting without making a decision and those planned to meet again the following Monday. The site in the ravine had been ruled out because it was thought that when the university expanded further south that "noisy athletic celebrations would be too near the precincts devoted to scholarly pursuits," in particular a library to be built. The decision was pushed back in part because of President Chase's absence and as one committee member stated "It's too important a question to be settled hastily. The University is growing, and we've got to look a long way ahead." After the meeting two additional sites were being considered: one 400 feet down from the ravine and southeast of the Old Chapel Hill Cemetery. By December 3, surveyors were working on the two new sites, as well as the original proposed location in the ravine, and they were to prepare reports for the committee's meeting the following Monday. The site 500 feet down from the ravine was chosen and during the meeting, the committee walked through the future site where areas had been staked marking limits of the field and the stands. Woollen, who was on the committee, reaffirmed the prior statements that the stadium would be completed before Thanksgiving 1927.

=== Construction ===
By December 9, most of the undergrowth had been removed and some tree felling had started. The tree stumps were to be "grubbed up," dynamited, or removed with the steam shovel. Once those were removed, the grading process was to begin. The dynamited earth will be collected and dumped into the lower levels. A brook flowed through the ravine at the time and a concrete culvert was constructed to bypass the stadium. Due to the ongoing construction around the university, a rock crusher was already present around campus was thought to have saved time. The stands made of brick were to be curved slightly in order to center the spectators' view on midfield. In total the stadium was to be 500 feet in length and the distance from the back of each set of stands to the other was 480 feet. Parking was planned to be hosted on the open athletic fields as the trees surrounding the stadium were to be kept to "preserve the beauty of the woods," which meant fans would get to the stadium on foot. The underbrush was to be cleared to allow for walkways through the Longleaf pine and oak trees to reach the stadium. The site of the new stadium was believed to be roughly 600 feet from the proposed library. Many traveled to visit the construction site when it began.

By February the steam shovel had been joined by three tractors to help move the dirt and crews had started working double shifts with the main goal of building up the northeast end of the field where the land falls away. The playing field was announced to be planted June 1, which then required frequent maintenance to be ready in time for use on Thanksgiving Day. Throughout the construction process many people came to watch the process take place throughout all times of the day. Since the start of January, the superintendent of T.C. Thompson & Bros. spoke that since January, the crews had only lost a half a day due to weather.

Prior to receiving the final layer of top soil, the field received an underground wiring system that will allow for flood lighting to be used in the stadium for "night spectacles" and also included telephone and telegraph wires. Architects Atwood-Nash and Woollen made plans for a covered area for press members to write up reports, use the typewriter and transmit reports by radio. By the end of February, the field was almost completely leveled. T. C. Thompson and Bros. started construction once the excavation was finished. In total about 55,000 cubic yards of dirt was relocated and the stadium was projected to have around 4,000 cubic yards of concrete. All of the concrete provided for the project came from the Atlas Portland Cement company. Final gift total $300,000. Prior to the concrete being poured on the dirt, it was steamrolled. The stands were planned to have 41 rows of seats.

In late February and early March, the excavation team led by Teer began to encounter large amount of granite rock and were forced to dynamite the blocks and then remove the pieces with chains and Caterpillar tractors. By mid-March, T. C. Atwood felt the excavation was over halfway and the concrete would be laid by June 1 and the stadium was on track be done by their target date. At this point, the playing field's middle section was completed and settling. A group of four students were bombarded with stone following a dynamite blast as they wandered around the southern woods of campus, which led to the crew sounding a horn before firing to alert surrounding areas and people. None of the students were injured. As the excavation stretched into April, it was slowing down. The blasts impact broke nearby university windows at Old East, Swain Hall, and the Campus YMCA and nearby private homes' windows and fine china, who began to protest and reach out to the Teer company. This led to the reduction in the amount of dynamite being used to lower the blast size.

By early May, the blasting was still being performed and superintendent of the excavation T. L. Higgs felt the excavation phase would not be done by July 1. This would push the targeted finish date to around January 1 from October 1. It was believed ten-fold of the blasting was done relative to initial estimates. The Teer company lost heavily with the contract because greater need for blasting. The company utilized a rock crusher to reduce 6,000 cubic yards of rock and sold it to the Thompson Co. to use for when making the stands. Due to the amount of blasting done by the Teer company, some of the excavation workers began calling it "Teer Stadium" as he was believed to have lost around $10,000 by May 1927. Within two weeks of this report, the Graduate manager Woollen stated November 1 was the tentative finish date and most of the rock had been blasted away and in total led to a six-week delay. This delay also led those to believe that seeding would not take place and instead grass would be brought in and planted. Concrete was ready to be poured into the wooden formers on the east side of the project.

By mid-June, the seats were being made at a rate of 500 per day which is the amount of seats in one section, the stadium was to hold 48 all together. In addition, the excavation was completed and the steam shovel was removed. The progress made by the crews allowed the university to move the completion date up to October 15. Sand and topsoil were brought in over the next few weeks and laid across where the playing field would be. The final stands of the east section were poured on July 9. At this point, it was confirmed there were plans to erect a building to house lockers, showers, and fitting rooms for both teams on the south side of the project. In addition, the playing field was near ready for planting after hundreds of truckloads brought a total of 10,000 cubic yards of sand and topsoil. A parapet was constructed 15 feet behind the eastern stands. This building was expected to be completed in early September. The west stand was to house at the top of the press box, while the edge of the field would have telephones placed so that reporters can have exact yardage, plays, penalties, and more relayed to them. The south end zone housed the score board, while the east stands housed the Governors Box at the top. On July 27, two tons of fertilizer was spread over the field, with the grass previously sowed, it was estimated the grass would sprout by the middle of August. T. C. Thompson used a Bermuda grass and lawn grass which was found best for football fields at the time.

The stadium was completed on August 6, when the last of the eastern stands were poured and only some minor finishing touches remained. In total it was completed three months prior to the original finish date, with construction taking seven months total. Around the middle of August, the grass in the center of the field was reportedly off to a "good start" believed to be due to the soil used and a "vigorous fertilizer." The Washington Douglas fir wooden seats half the width of the concrete steps were next to be installed and Douglas were chosen for their durability. The seats were painted once before being installed and received a second coat after being placed into the concrete with iron brackets. Four restrooms were to be placed behind each set of stands. The whole stadium area was surrounded by a wire fence from Charlotte's General Equipment company and concrete pillars were constructed on the north end in the valley between entry gates. It was confirmed that the Carolina–Virginia game would be where the stadium is dedicated.

In the week preceding the Davidson game, the goal posts were placed and painted white and the pedestrian walkways around the stadium were covered in gravel. The field house's scaffolding was removed and the red tile roof was placed.

== History ==
As the stadium's first game approached, Woollen stated that "Orders for seats are now pouring in at a rate of 500 a day..." for the upcoming match against Virginia. The tickets were planned to be first be mailed out on November 15. Plans were being made at this time for a large police force to be present for the Virginia game to hep with traffic and directing the spectators. Kenan Memorial Stadium opened for the first game on November 12, 1927, when the Tar Heels faced the Davidson Wildcats at 2 PM local time where tickets were $1.50. Around 9,000 spectators attended the event which saw the Tar Heels win the game 27–0. Edison Foard scored the new stadium's first touchdown six minutes into the game.

Dr. William Chambers Coker, who was a botanist and had previously worked with trees and shrubbery around campus, helped out with enhancing the appearance of the new stadium. On November 24, 1927, the stadium was officially opened and dedicated during a game where the Tar Heels hosted the Virginia Cavaliers for their 31st annual meeting. The stadium was completely full, 28,000-30,000 fans attended the matchup, which meant over 3,000 had to stand to view the game or peer through fences. While honoring Kenan, approximately 200 students wearing blue and white spelled out "K-E-N-A-N" on the field and said "We thank you" three times as they had nine rahs. John Sprunt Hill presented the stadium to Governor of North Carolina Angus Wilton McLean and the board of trustees in a speech that talked of the Kenan family generosity over the years including the formation of the Kenan trust and the starting of the first university power plant. McLean spoke, accepting the new stadium and made similar remarks towards Kenan Jr. Kenan did not make a speech at the event. The entire dedication was broadcast on the radio as the teams warmed up before the start of the game. The game started five minutes late. North Carolina won in large part due to an extra point by Captain Garrett Morehead who made both extra points after each score. The game notably saw Carolina's Jimmy Ward and Virginia's George Taylor tried to fight and were expelled from the game as the game was close to ending.

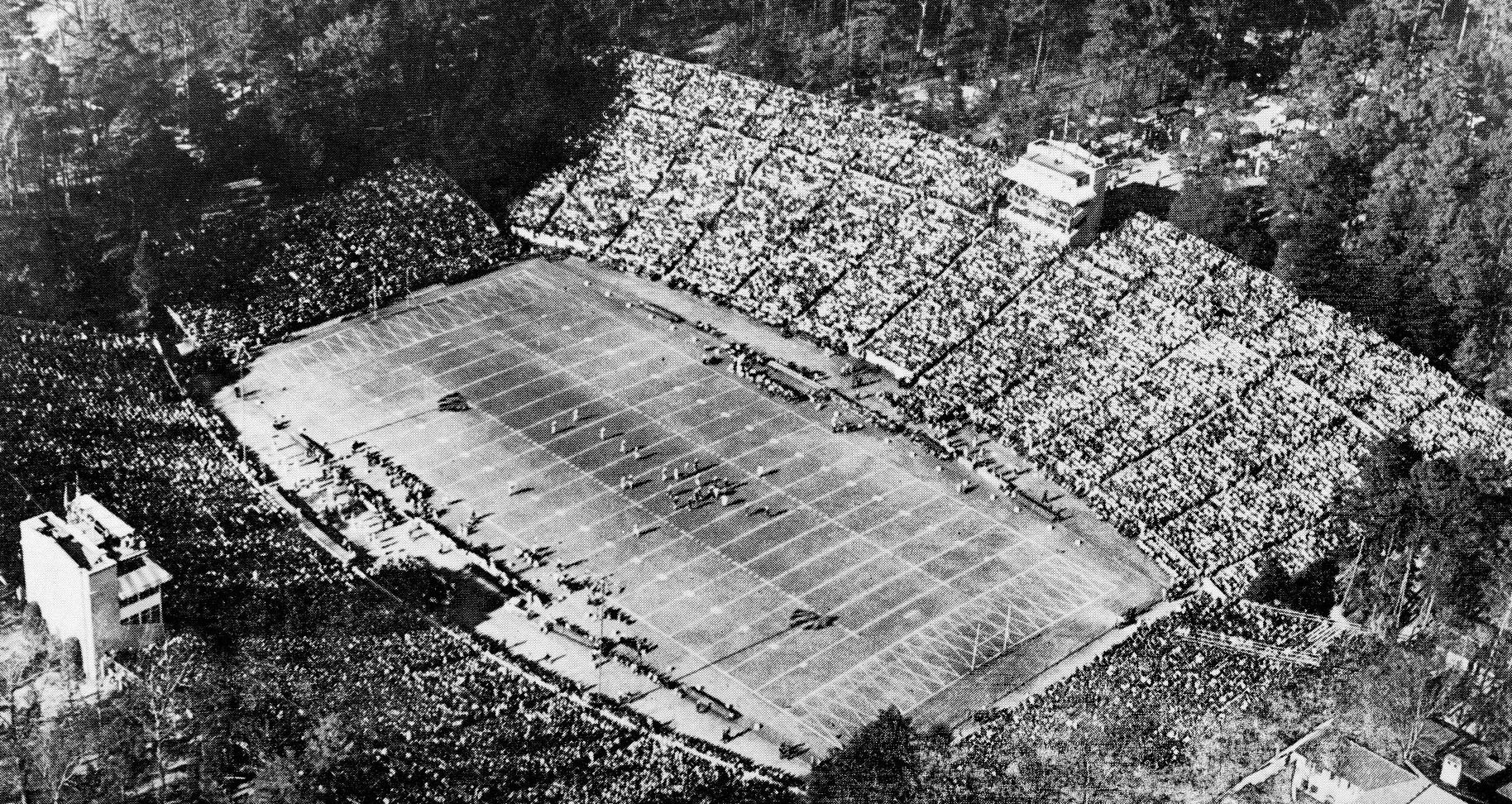
Kenan Memorial Stadium in 1959

The original stadium—the lower level of the current stadium's sideline seats—seated 24,000 people. However, temporary bleachers were added to the end zones to accommodate overflow crowds, allowing Kenan to accommodate over 40,000 people at times. This happened fairly often over the years, especially during the Choo Choo Justice era of the late 1940s. At the time it was built, it was located on the far southern portion of campus, but expansions over the years have resulted in the stadium now being near the center of campus. Local architect TC Atwood designed the stadium; he would later design Georgia's Sanford Stadium along lines similar to Kenan.

The largest crowd to see a game at Kenan—and the largest to see a game on-campus in the state of North Carolina—was a standing-room-only throng of 62,000 when the Tar Heels hosted the Florida State Seminoles in 1997. The largest paid crowd was a crowd of 62,000 that saw the Tar Heels face Duke in 2013. The 1991 season opener versus Cincinnati and the Clemson game, which was televised nationally by ESPN, were UNC's first true night home games in school history.

The Tar Heels football team sold out every game from 1992 to 1999, and also sold out all but one game of Butch Davis's tenure. Most of the west end zone and three sections of the south stands are reserved for students. The student section of the west end zone is popularly known as the "Tar Pit"—a name applied to the entire stadium during the late 1990s.

From 2007 to 2010, fireworks were shot from atop Kenan Field House whenever the Tar Heels took the field, as well as after every score and win. They were removed in 2011, but reinstated in 2012 after Larry Fedora's arrival, and for the next three seasons were shot off behind the west end zone.

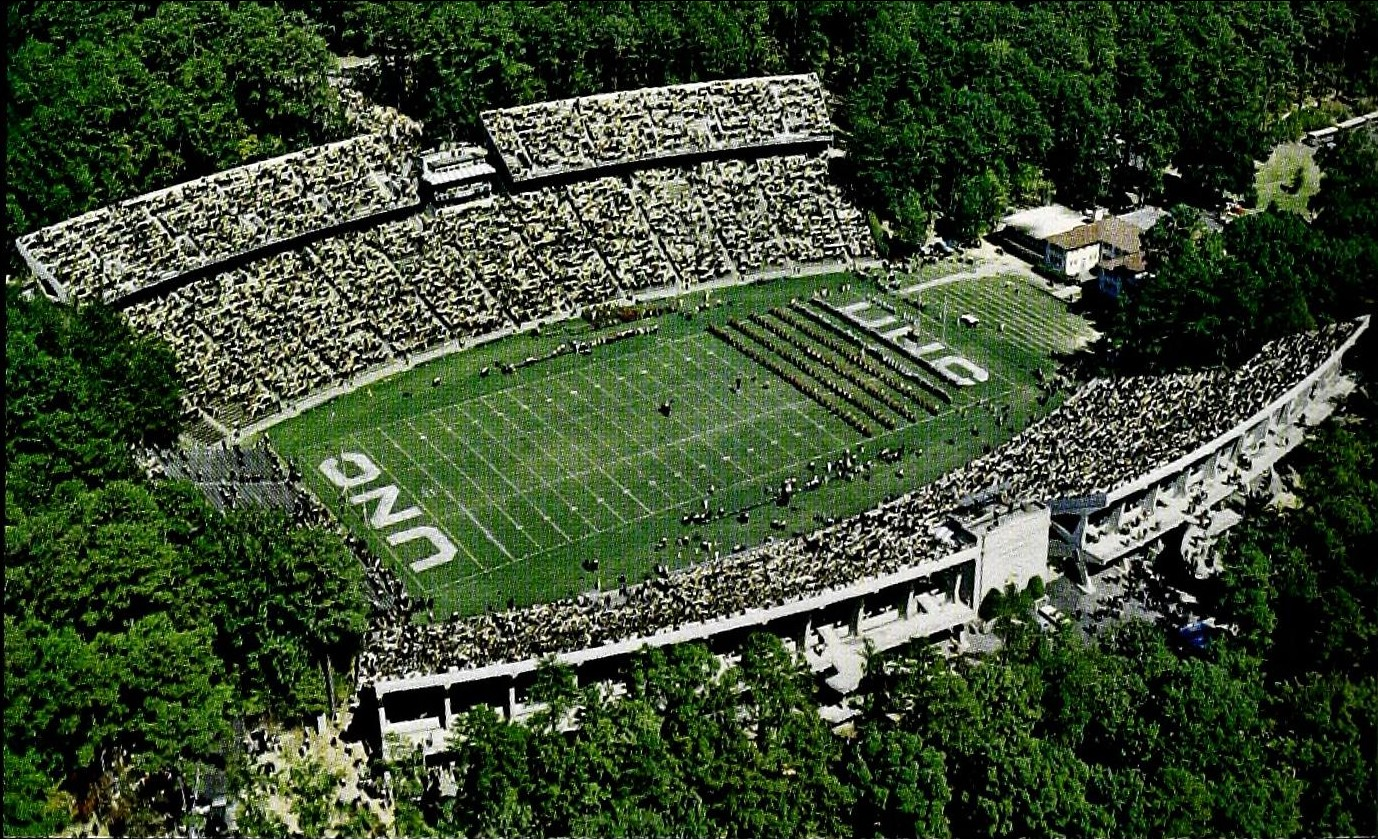
The stadium in 1971

The stadium was first expanded in 1963, when Kenan (who died in 1965) donated $1 million to double-deck the sideline seats and add permanent bleachers to the end zones, expanding capacity to 48,000. A seating adjustment in 1979 boosted capacity to 50,000. In 1988, the old press box and chancellor's box were replaced by 2,000 seats between the 40-yard lines, expanding capacity to 52,000.

Part of the 1987-88 project were a permanent lighting system, a chancellor's lounge on the north side of the field and a football lettermen's lounge on the south side. The lights are part of a General Electric low-mount system which minimizes the height of the lightpoles. Cost of the entire project was $7 million. It was funded by private gifts and bonds.

The stadium's biggest renovation project to date took place from 1995 to 1998. Head coach Mack Brown wanted a better facility to showcase a resurgent football program, which had gone from consecutive 1–10 seasons in 1988 and 1989 to a run of success not approached since the 1940s. The stadium was lacking in many areas. For instance, Kenan was one of the few Division I stadiums not to have permanent seating in at least one end zone; the only end zone seats at the time were the portable bleachers added in 1963. Also, the locker rooms were somewhat cramped by 1990s standards.

Several generous gifts resulted in the addition of a new playing field and a brand-new facility for the football team, the Frank H. Kenan Football Center, named for the great-grandson of the stadium's original benefactor. The Kenan Center included a memorabilia section showcasing the football program's history. The most visible addition, however, was 8,000 new seats in the west end zone, which turned the stadium into a horseshoe. Also added was a "preferred seating box" atop the north stands. Due to state law, only 6,000 of the new end zone seats were available in 1997. Capacity dropped to 48,500 in 1996, but leaped to 57,800 in 1997. The other 2,200 seats were added in 1998, bringing the stadium to a capacity of 60,000, not eclipsed until the 2011 season. In 2003, a modern scoreboard with video capability was added in front of Kenan Field House. The next addition came before the 2007 season, when the old matrix boards on the sidelines were replaced with ribbon boards.

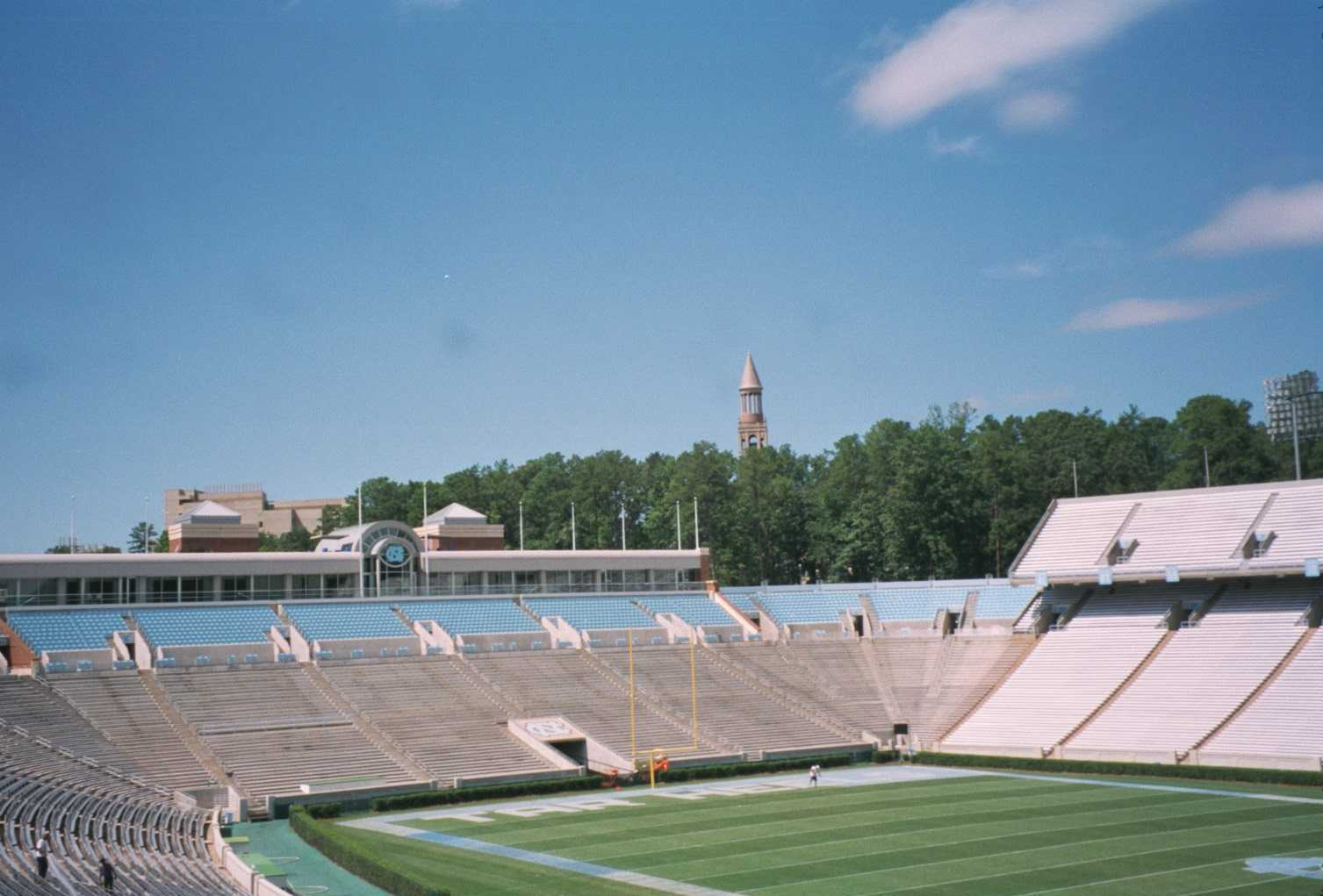
The West End Zone addition in 1998 created a horseshoe.

In December 2006, the Chapel Hill Town Council approved changes to UNC's development plan that included at least 8,800 additional seats for Kenan Stadium.

In October 2007, athletic director Dick Baddour announced plans for extensive renovations to Kenan Stadium. Plans called for a new academic support center in place of Kenan Field House, plus anywhere from 5,000 to 15,000 additional seats. The new seats would be added in the east end zone, turning the stadium into a bowl. Plans would have to be approved by the chancellor and the board of trustees, and would almost certainly require a fundraising effort by the Rams Club. No specific timetable was set, but Baddour said that he hoped to begin construction within 18 months.

This "masterplan" was divided into two phases; phase one covering the west end zone and two covering the east end zone. The first phase consisted of adding a fifth floor (for recruiting and media space) along with remodeling the existing offices and team spaces in the Kenan Football Center. Approved on July 23, 2008, by the board of trustees for $50 million, Phase I renovations were completed on August for the 2009 Football Season.

A third and final phase of the project was also planned. This includes new club-level seats around the perimeter of the stadium, a new suite level above the club seats, a much larger press box, and a brick facade encircling the outside of the stadium. Construction of this phase has not been scheduled, however, due to budgetary constraints.

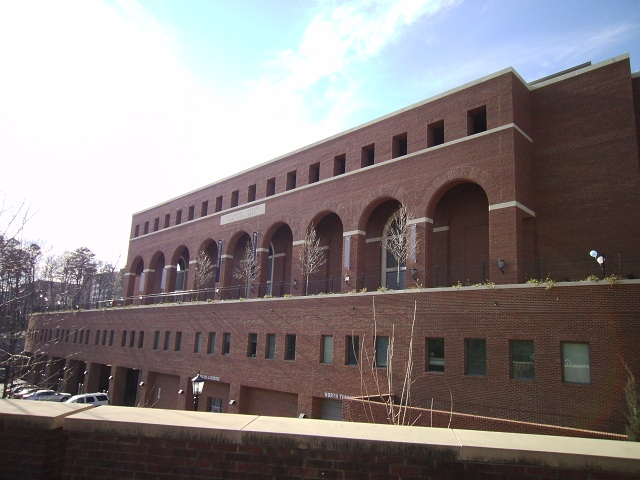
The Loudermilk Center in the east end zone, which turned the stadium into a bowl. Includes the Blue Zone.

On May 27, 2010, the University of North Carolina at Chapel Hill Board of Trustees approved the immediate commencement on construction of the "Carolina Student-Athlete Center for Excellence", a $70 million expansion that would replace Kenan Field House. The entire project was funded by private donations and the selling of club seats and individual suites. This facility would be a combination of an academic center, "Carolina Leadership Academy", Olympic sports' strength and conditioning center, and visitor lockers within a span of two floors.

However, the most significantly visible portion of the renovation was the addition of 2,980 seats. The additional seats in the end zone, named the Blue Zone, would be "1,836 seats in the Concourse Club just a few feet from the field, 824 seats in the Upper Club/Loge on the fourth floor and 320 seats in 20 suites on the fifth floor". The individual suites, each of which has 16 seats, will sell for $50,000 per year. Each seat in the club levels range from $750 to $2,500 per season. Furthermore, the construction of a new concourse in front of the Carolina Student-Athlete Center for Excellence would allow fans to move around the entire perimeter of Kenan Stadium for the first time. The exterior of the new section is similar in appearance to the Bell Tower.

The 2011 renovation and expansion fully enclosed the stadium for the first time in its history. This facility houses the Loudermilk Center for Student Excellence as well as 3,000 additional premium club, suite seating and lounge areas in the east end zone, bringing total stadium capacity to 63,000. As part of this addition, HD video boards were installed on each end of the stadium. In 2016, new ribbon boards and updated concessions were added. In 2018, the metal bleachers that had been in place for almost half a century were replaced with individual seats, reducing capacity to 50,500. The stadium switched the playing surface from natural grass to a RootZone synthetic grass surface manufactured by AstroTurf for the 2019 season. For the 2025 season the stadium will be switching back to natural grass with a synthetic turf perimeter.

William R. Kenan, to whom (along with his wife) the stadium was dedicated since its construction in 1927, was involved with the white supremacist Red Shirts who conducted the Wilmington massacre. In 2018, the university removed the dedication plaque and renamed the venue Kenan Stadium in honor of Kenan Jr. who made the original donation.

=== Performance at Kenan Stadium ===
Through the 2022 season the Tar Heels have played 95 seasons at Kenan Stadium earning a record of 317–198–16 (0.612) during that period. In that time, the Tar Heels won two Southern Conference football championships (1946 and 1949) and five Atlantic Coast Conference football championships (1963, 1971, 1972, 1977, and 1980). After the ACC divided into two divisions, the Atlantic and Coastal, North Carolina won the Coastal division twice in 2015 and 2022, but failed to win the ACC Championship Game each time. North Carolina's football team has gone undefeated at home eight times: 1927 (2–0), 1935 (4–0), 1939 (5–0), 1972 (6–0), 1974 (6–0), 1980 (7–0), 1996 (5–0), and 2015 (7–0). Including ties, the Tar Heels had an additional four seasons with an undefeated home record: 1930 (3–0–2), 1942 (3–0–1), 1946 (4–0–1), and 1948 (4–0–1). The most home victories obtained in one season is seven in the 1980 and 2015 seasons. The most home losses in one season is six in the 2002 and 2017 seasons. In total there have been two winless seasons: 1952 (0–4) and 2002 (0–6).

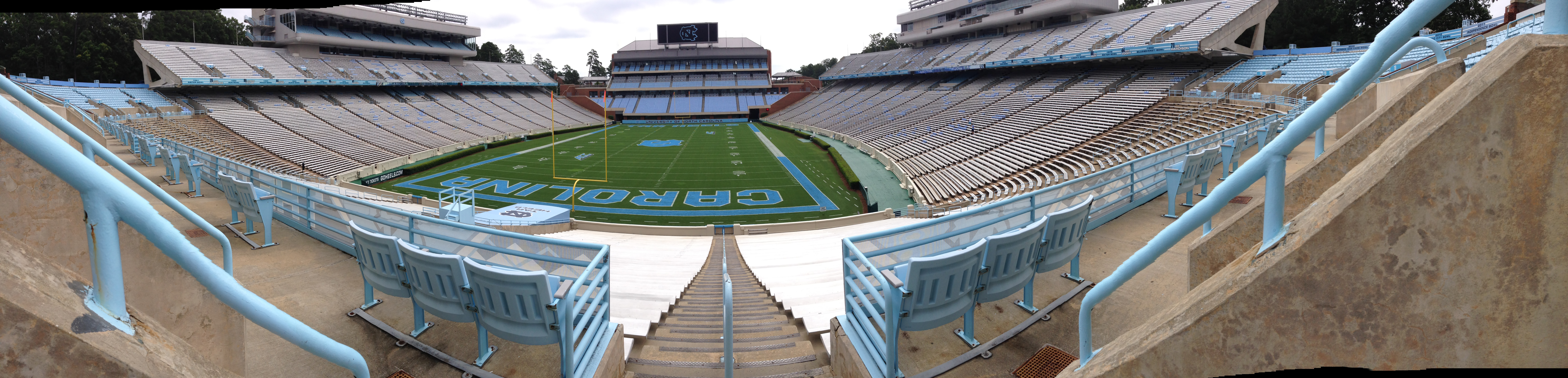
A panoramic photograph of Kenan Memorial Stadium in 2014

== Other uses ==
Aerial video footage of Kenan Stadium in 2025

Aside from hosting college football events the stadium has been used for several purposes. It serves as the venue for the spring commencement ceremonies for the school.

United States Presidents John F. Kennedy and Bill Clinton both spoke in the stadium in 1961 and 1993, respectively. On October 12, 1961, Kennedy spoke in a fourteen-minute speech to a crowd of around 32,000 in Kenan Stadium as he accepted an honorary law degree from the university. President Clinton spoke before a crowd of over 50,000 on Tuesday night October 12, 1993 where he urged the passage of the Brady Bill, while also discussing health care reform and family medical leave, among other topics.

Following the deaths of US Presidents Franklin D. Roosevelt and Kennedy, memorials were held in their honor at Kenan Memorial Stadium. Roosevelt's service was held on April 14, 1945, where over 6,000 people attended and university President Frank Porter Graham spoke regarding the deceased. The service in honor of Kennedy was held on May 17, 1964, and was held in part to raise money for the Kennedy Memorial Library on Harvard University's campus. Over 10,000 people attended and paid $10 a ticket to hear former University President Graham, Kennedy's brother and United States Senator Ted, and Kennedy's mother Rose speak.

Between 1963 and 1971, the university held festival at the end of the spring term called Jubilee and as the event grew several performances took place in Kenan Stadium in 1969 and 1970. Aside from the Jubliee, Kenan Stadium has hosted several concerts throughout its history: Jimmy Buffett (1979), The Spinners (1979), The Beach Boys (1980), Joan Jett and the Blackhearts (1982), U2 (1983), Grandmaster Flash & The Furious Five (1983), and Bruce Springsteen (2003), among others. Following the men's basketball team following their victory in the 1982 National Championship game, the stadium hosted a welcome home celebration for the team where over 20,000 fans attended. Following the school's victory in the 1993 national championship game, a victory celebration was planned to be hosted in Kenan, but was instead held at the Dean Smith Center because of rain. For several years Kenan hosted a fireworks display on July 4, but this was moved away from the stadium in 2019 because of increased costs to protect the stadium's artificial turf. In addition, there were some safety concerns after one fireworks was deflected off the stadium's barrier walls, but none were harmed.

In April 2026, Kenan Stadium hosted two baseball games between the Savannah Bananas and Texas Tailgaters of the Banana Ball Championship League.

=== Other football games ===
The stadium hosts a couple football division championships of the North Carolina High School Athletic Association each year.

On August 11, 1990, an event called "Carolina Kickoff II" was held in the stadium by future owner and founder of the Carolina Panthers Jerry Richardson. It was done to help show the Carolinas could support a professional team in the National Football League. The contest was between the Atlanta Falcons and the Washington Redskins, where the Falcons won 31–27.

=== Soccer ===
On July 19, 2023, Kenan hosted a friendly between Chelsea F.C. and Wrexham A.F.C. as a part of the 2023 Florida Cup, where Chelsea won 5–0. In 2024, Kenan hosted a friendly between Manchester City and Celtic which Manchester City lost 4–3. On June 10, 2025, Kenan hosted an international friendly between Mexico and Turkey.

Date	Team #1	Result	Team #2	Tournament	Spectators
July 19, 2023	(England) Chelsea	5–0	(Wales) Wrexham	Friendly; 2023 Florida Cup	50,596
July 23, 2024	(England) Manchester City	3–4	(Scotland) Celtic	Friendly; 2024 Florida Cup	30,000
June 10, 2025	Mexico	1–0	Turkey	International Friendly	25,606

== See also ==
- List of NCAA Division I FBS football stadiums
