= 2021 Florida Cup =

Seventh edition of Florida Cup

Tournament details
- Host country: United States
- Dates: July 25 – 28
- Teams: 4 (from 3 confederations)
- Venue: 1 (in 1 host city)

Final positions
- Champions: (England) Everton (1st title)
- Runners-up: (Colombia) Millonarios

Tournament statistics
- Matches played: 3
- Goals scored: 8 (2.67 per match)
- Top scorers: David Silva (Millonarios); Jonathan Álvez (Atlético Nacional); (2 goals)

The 2021 Florida Cup is the seventh edition of Florida Cup, a friendly association football tournament played in the United States. It was contested from July 25 to 28. Due to the COVID-19 pandemic, the tournament was scheduled for July instead of January.

The teams originally scheduled for the tournament were English clubs Everton and Arsenal, Italian club Inter Milan and Colombian club Millonarios. On July 20, Arsenal announced their withdrawal due to positive COVID-19 tests among their coaching staff, and Inter Milan withdrew citing concerns over rising COVID-19 cases in Florida.

Mexican side UNAM and Colombian club Atlético Nacional were added to the schedule to face Everton and Millonarios for their second match on a July 28 doubleheader. It was decided that the winner of the opening match between Everton and Millonarios would be declared winner of the tournament. Everton defeated Millonarios 10–9 on penalties after a 1–1 draw.

== Teams ==
Nation	Team	Location	Confederation	League
England	Everton F.C.	Liverpool	UEFA	Premier League
Colombia	Millonarios F.C.	Bogotá	CONMEBOL	Categoría Primera A
Colombia	Atlético Nacional	Medellín	CONMEBOL	Categoría Primera A
Mexico	UNAM	Mexico City	CONCACAF	Liga MX

== Venues ==
Orlando
Camping World Stadium
Capacity: 60,219
Location of Florida in the United States.	Location of the host city of the 2021 Florida Cup in Florida.

== Standings ==
Pos	Team	Pld	W	PW	PL	L	GF	GA	GD	Pts	Final result
1	(England) Everton (C)	2	1	1	0	0	2	1	+1	5	Florida Cup champions
2	(Colombia) Millonarios	2	0	0	1	1	3	4	−1	1	
3	(Colombia) Atlético Nacional	1	1	0	0	0	3	2	+1	3	
4	(Mexico) UNAM	1	0	0	0	1	0	1	−1	0	

Source: Florida Cup
Rules for classification: The winner of the match between Everton and Millonarios classified as tournament champions.
(C) Champion

== Matches ==
July 25, 2021
18:00 EST (UTC−5)
Championship Match

Everton (England)	1–1	(Colombia) Millonarios
Gray 64' (pen.)	Report	Llinás 19'
Penalties
Keane (penalty scored); Gray (penalty scored); Gordon (penalty missed); Gomes (penalty scored); Broadhead (penalty scored); Gbamin (penalty scored); Gibson (penalty scored); Kenny (penalty scored); Davies (penalty scored); Anderson (penalty scored); Begović (penalty scored)	10–9	(penalty scored) Pereira; (penalty missed) Márquez; (penalty scored) Vargas; (penalty scored) Abadía; (penalty scored) Ruiz; (penalty scored) Guerra; (penalty scored) García; (penalty scored) Bertel; (penalty scored) Murillo; (penalty scored) Román; (penalty missed) Moreno

Camping World Stadium, Orlando
Referee: Elvis Osmanovic (United States)

July 28, 2021
18:00 EST (UTC−5)

Everton (England)	1–0	(Mexico) UNAM
Kean 19'

Camping World Stadium, Orlando

July 28, 2021
20:45 EST (UTC−5)

Millonarios (Colombia)	2–3	(Colombia) Atlético Nacional
Silva 25', 33'		Barrera 6'; Álvez 31', 44'

Camping World Stadium, Orlando
