= 2017 Florida Cup =

Tournament details
- Host country: United States
- Dates: January 8 – 21
- Teams: 12 (from 3 confederations)
- Venue: 4 (in 4 host cities)

Final positions
- Champions: (Brazil) São Paulo (1st title)

The 2017 Florida Cup was the third edition of Florida Cup, a friendly association football tournament played in the United States. The event was played under two different formats, one with points awarded to the participating clubs' countries and the other a single-match knockout tournament.

== Teams ==
Nation	Team	Location	Confederation	League
Argentina	River Plate	Buenos Aires	CONMEBOL	Primera División
Argentina	Estudiantes	La Plata	CONMEBOL	Primera División
Brazil	Atlético Mineiro	Belo Horizonte	CONMEBOL	Campeonato Brasileiro Série A
Brazil	Bahia	Salvador	CONMEBOL	Campeonato Brasileiro Série A
Brazil	Corinthians	São Paulo	CONMEBOL	Campeonato Brasileiro Série A
Brazil	São Paulo	São Paulo	CONMEBOL	Campeonato Brasileiro Série A
Brazil	Vasco da Gama	Rio de Janeiro	CONMEBOL	Campeonato Brasileiro Série A
Colombia	Millonarios	Bogotá	CONMEBOL	Categoría Primera A
Ecuador	Barcelona	Guayaquil	CONMEBOL	Campeonato Ecuatoriano de Fútbol Serie A
Germany	Bayer Leverkusen	Leverkusen	UEFA	Bundesliga
Germany	VfL Wolfsburg	Wolfsburg	UEFA	Bundesliga
United States	Tampa Bay Rowdies	St. Petersburg	CONCACAF	USL

== Venues ==
St. Petersburg	Bay Lake
Al Lang Stadium	ESPN Wide World of Sports Complex
Capacity: 7,227	Capacity: 9,500
Location of Florida in the United States.	Location of the host cities of the 2017 Florida Cup in Florida.
Orlando	Lauderhill
Bright House Networks Stadium	Central Broward Stadium
Capacity: 44,206	Capacity: 25,000

== Challenge ==
=== Format ===
The "Challenge" will be played in a format similar to the Davis Cup, in tennis. Each team will play two matches and score points for their country. A victory yields three points, a tie one point, and an extra point is awarded for the winner in penalty shootouts. The country with the most points wins the competition. The first tiebreaking criteria will be goal difference, followed by goals scored.

=== Germany ===
Rank	Team	GP	W	D	L	GF	GA	GD	Pts
1	(Germany) VfL Wolfsburg	2	1	1	0	2	0	2	5
2	(Germany) Bayer Leverkusen	2	1	1	0	2	1	1	5
Total Germany		4	2	2	0	4	1	3	10

=== Brazil ===
Rank	Team	GP	W	D	L	GF	GA	GD	Pts
1	(Brazil) Atlético Mineiro	2	1	0	1	2	1	1	3
2	(Brazil) Bahia	2	0	1	1	1	2	–1	1
Total Brazil		4	1	1	2	3	3	0	4

=== Argentina/United States ===
Rank	Team	GP	W	D	L	GF	GA	GD	Pts
1	(Argentina) Estudiantes de La Plata	2	1	1	0	2	1	1	4
2	(United States) Tampa Bay Rowdies	2	0	0	2	0	4	–4	0
Total US/Argentina		4	1	1	2	2	5	–3	4

=== Challenge Matches ===
January 8
14:00 EST (UTC-5)

Estudiantes (Argentina)	1–1	(Germany) Bayer Leverkusen
Umeres 33'	Report	Schreck 70'
Penalties
Aguirregaray (penalty missed); González Pírez (penalty scored); Marchioni (penalty scored); Diarte (penalty missed)	2–4	(penalty scored) Kießling; (penalty scored) Aránguiz; (penalty missed) Mehmedi; (penalty scored) Brandt; (penalty scored) Dragović

Al Lang Stadium, St. Petersburg
Referee: Vincent Apple-Chiarella
January 8
16:45 EST (UTC-5)

Tampa Bay Rowdies (United States)	0–2	(Germany) Wolfsburg
	Rowdies Report; Wolfsburg Report	Herrmann 6', 41'

Al Lang Stadium, St. Petersburg
Referee: Jonathan Wener
January 11
19:00 EST (UTC-5)

Bayer Leverkusen (Germany)	1–0	(Brazil) Atlético Mineiro
Hernández 52'	Report

ESPN Wide World of Sports Complex, Bay Lake
Referee: Matthew Miscannnon
January 12
19:00 EST (UTC-5)

VfL Wolfsburg (Germany)	0–0	(Brazil) Bahia
Penalties
Reichwein (penalty scored); Kleihs (penalty missed); Wimmer (penalty missed); Abdat (penalty scored); Herrmann (penalty scored)	3–2	(penalty missed) Gustavo; (penalty scored) Kaynan; (penalty scored) Edson; (penalty missed) Renato Cajá; (penalty missed) Feijão

ESPN Wide World of Sports Complex, Bay Lake
Referee: Vincent Apple-Chiarella
January 14
16:00 EST (UTC-5)

Tampa Bay Rowdies (United States)	0–2	(Brazil) Atlético Mineiro
		Leonan 8'; Rodrigo 52'

Al Lang Stadium, St. Petersburg
January 15
16:45 EST (UTC-5)

Bahia (Brazil)	0–1	(Argentina) Estudiantes
		Tinga 16' (o.g.)

Bright House Networks Stadium, Orlando

== Playoff ==
The playoff tournament will be played with single-elimination matches.

First round

Semifinals

Final

=== Playoff Matches ===
January 15
14:00 EST (UTC-5)
Quarterfinals

Vasco da Gama (Brazil)	2–1	(Ecuador) Barcelona S.C.
Nené 29'; Rodrigo 84'		Washington Vera 22'

Central Broward Stadium, Lauderhill
January 15
14:00 EST (UTC-5)
Quarterfinals

River Plate (Argentina)	1–0	(Colombia) Millonarios F.C.
Alario 5'

Bright House Networks Stadium, Orlando
January 18
16:30 EST (UTC-5)
Consolation

Barcelona S.C. (Ecuador)	0–1	(Colombia) Millonarios F.C.
		Juan Guillermo Domínguez 88'

Bright House Networks Stadium, Orlando
January 18
19:00 EST (UTC-5)
Semifinals

Vasco da Gama (Brazil)	1–4	(Brazil) Corinthians
Éder Luís 24'		Camacho 20'; Marlone 45+1'; Kazim 81'; Marquinhos Gabriel 89'

Bright House Networks Stadium, Orlando
January 19
19:00 EST (UTC-5)
Semifinals

São Paulo (Brazil)	0–0	(Argentina) River Plate
Penalties
João Schmidt (penalty scored); Cícero (penalty scored); Wesley (penalty missed); Shaylon (penalty scored); Gilberto (penalty scored); Júnior Tavares (penalty scored); Felipe Araruna (penalty scored); Lugano (penalty scored); Lucão (penalty scored)	8–7	(penalty missed) Martínez; (penalty scored) Fernández; (penalty scored) Mora; (penalty scored) Driussi; (penalty scored) Mina; (penalty scored) Arzura; (penalty scored) Montiel; (penalty scored) Mayada; (penalty missed) Moya

Al Lang Stadium, St. Petersburg
Referee: Andrew Musashe
January 21
15:15 EST (UTC-5)
Third Place

Vasco da Gama (Brazil)	1–0	(Argentina) River Plate
Nenê 74'

Bright House Networks Stadium, Orlando
January 21
18:00 EST (UTC-5)
Final

Corinthians (Brazil)	0–0	(Brazil) São Paulo
Penalties
Fellipe Bastos (penalty missed); Giovanni Augusto (penalty scored); Marciel (penalty missed); Paulo Roberto (penalty scored); Marlone (penalty scored)	3–4	(penalty scored) João Schmidt; (penalty scored) Cícero; (penalty missed) Felipe Araruna; (penalty scored) Júnior Tavares; (penalty scored) Gilberto

Bright House Networks Stadium, Orlando
