= 2015 Florida Cup =

Tournament details
- Host country: United States
- Dates: January 15 – 17
- Teams: 4 (from 2 confederations)
- Venue(s): 2 (in 2 host cities)

Final positions
- Champions: Köln (1st title); Germany (1st title)

Tournament statistics
- Matches played: 4
- Goals scored: 12 (3 per match)
- Top scorer(s): (Peru) Paolo Guerrero (3 goals)
- Best player(s): (Peru) Paolo Guerrero

The 2015 Florida Cup was a friendly association football tournament. It was the first tournament played in the United States.

== Teams ==
Nation	Team	Location	Confederation	League
Germany	Köln	Cologne	UEFA	Bundesliga
Germany	Bayer Leverkusen	Leverkusen	UEFA	Bundesliga
Brazil	Corinthians	São Paulo	CONMEBOL	Campeonato Brasileiro Série A
Brazil	Fluminense	Rio de Janeiro	CONMEBOL	Campeonato Brasileiro Série A

== Venues ==
The ESPN Wide World of Sports Complex in Bay Lake and EverBank Field in Jacksonville hosted all four matches of the competition.

Bay Lake	Jacksonville
ESPN Wide World of Sports Complex	EverBank Field
28°20′13.5″N 81°33′21.6″W	43°46′50.96″N 11°16′56.13″E
Capacity: 9,500	Capacity: 66,851
Location of Florida in the United States.	Location of the host cities of the 2015 Florida Cup in Florida.

== Matches ==
January 15
18:00 EST (UTC-5)

Fluminense (Brazil)	0–3	(Germany) Bayer Leverkusen
	Report	Kießling 44'; Rolfes 77'; Drmić 78'

ESPN Wide World of Sports Complex, Bay Lake
Referee: Mark Cahen (United States)
January 15
20:30 EST (UTC-5)

Köln (Germany)	1–0	(Brazil) Corinthians
Peszko 13'	Report

ESPN Wide World of Sports Complex, Bay Lake
Referee: Robert Sibiga (United States)

January 17
15:00 EST (UTC-5)

Corinthians (Brazil)	2–1	(Germany) Bayer Leverkusen
Guerrero 28' 58'		Yurchenko 13'

EverBank Field, Jacksonville
Attendance: 19,410
Referee: Kevin Terry (United States)
January 17
16:30 EST (UTC-5)

Fluminense (Brazil)	2–3	(Germany) Köln
Edson 5'; Walter 70'		Ujah 7'; Finne 50'; Halfar 66'

EverBank Field, Jacksonville
Attendance: 19,410
Referee: Younes Marrakchi (United States)

== Tables ==
=== Teams ===
Pos.	Team	Pld	W	D	L	GF	GA	GD	Pts
1	(Germany) Köln	2	2	0	0	4	2	+2	6
2	(Germany) Bayer Leverkusen	2	1	0	1	4	2	+2	3
3	(Brazil) Corinthians	2	1	0	1	2	2	0	3
4	(Brazil) Fluminense	2	0	0	2	2	6	−4	0

=== Countries ===
Pos.	Team	Pld	W	D	L	GF	GA	GD	Pts
1	Germany	4	3	0	1	7	5	+2	9
2	Brazil	4	1	0	3	5	7	–2	3
