= 2022 Florida Cup =

Eighth edition of Florida Cup

- 2022 Florida Cup promotional poster

Tournament details
- Host country: United States
- Dates: July 16 – 23
- Teams: 5 (from 2 confederations)
- Venues: 4 (in 3 host cities)

Final positions
- Champions: (England) Arsenal (1st title)
- Runners-up: (England) Chelsea

Tournament statistics
- Matches played: 4
- Goals scored: 13 (3.25 per match)
- Top scorer(s): Thirteen players (1 goal each)

The 2022 Florida Cup was the eighth edition of Florida Cup, a friendly association football tournament played in the United States. It was contested from July 16 to 23, 2022. For the first time, the tournament featured a Florida Cup series called the Clash of Nations.

The teams scheduled for the series were English clubs Chelsea and Arsenal, American clubs Charlotte FC and Orlando City SC and Mexican club América. The series concluded with a match between Arsenal and Chelsea to decide the winner, with Arsenal winning 4–0.

== Teams ==
| Nation | Team | Location | Confederation | League |
|---|---|---|---|---|
| Mexico | América | Mexico City | CONCACAF | Liga MX |
| England | Arsenal | London | UEFA | Premier League |
| United States | Charlotte FC | Charlotte | CONCACAF | Major League Soccer |
| England | Chelsea | London | UEFA | Premier League |
| United States | Orlando City SC | Orlando | CONCACAF | Major League Soccer |

== Venues ==
| Paradise, Nevada | Charlotte, North Carolina | Location of the host cities of the 2022 Florida Cup. |
|---|---|---|
| Allegiant Stadium | Bank of America Stadium | Location of the host cities of the 2022 Florida Cup. |
| Capacity: 65,000 | Capacity: 75,412 | Location of the host cities of the 2022 Florida Cup. |
| Orlando, Florida | | Location of the host cities of the 2022 Florida Cup. |
| Exploria Stadium | Camping World Stadium | Location of the host cities of the 2022 Florida Cup. |
| Capacity: 25,500 | Capacity: 65,194 | Location of the host cities of the 2022 Florida Cup. |

== Standings ==
| Pos | Team | Pld | W | PW | PL | L | GF | GA | GD | Pts | Final result |
|---|---|---|---|---|---|---|---|---|---|---|---|
| 1 | (England) Arsenal (C) | 2 | 2 | 0 | 0 | 0 | 7 | 1 | +6 | 6 | Florida Cup champions |
| 2 | (England) Chelsea | 3 | 1 | 0 | 1 | 1 | 3 | 6 | −3 | 4 | |
| 3 | (United States) Charlotte FC | 1 | 0 | 1 | 0 | 0 | 1 | 1 | 0 | 2 | |
| 4 | (Mexico) América | 1 | 0 | 0 | 0 | 1 | 1 | 2 | −1 | 0 | |
| 5 | (United States) Orlando City SC | 1 | 0 | 0 | 0 | 1 | 1 | 3 | −2 | 0 | |

Source: Florida Cup
Rules for classification: The winner of the match between Arsenal and Chelsea classified as tournament champions.
(C) Champion

== Matches ==
16 July 2022
22:00 EDT
FC Series

| Chelsea (England) | 2–1 | (Mexico) América |
|---|---|---|
| Werner 55'; Mount 83' | Report | James 60' (o.g.) |

Allegiant Stadium, Paradise, Nevada
Attendance: 47,223
Referee: Kevin Broadley (United States)

20 July 2022
19:30 EDT
FC Series

| Charlotte FC (United States) | 1–1 | (England) Chelsea |
|---|---|---|
| Ríos 90+2' (pen.) | Report | Pulisic 30' |
Penalties
| Ríos (penalty scored); Makoun (penalty scored); Walkes (penalty scored); Mora (penalty scored); Jóźwiak (penalty scored) | 5–3 | (penalty scored) Havertz; (penalty scored) Chilwell; (penalty missed) Gallagher; (penalty scored) Sterling |

Bank of America Stadium, Charlotte, North Carolina
Attendance: 52,673
Referee: Rosendo Mendoza (United States)

20 July 2022
19:30 EDT
FC Series

| Orlando City SC (United States) | 1–3 | (England) Arsenal |
|---|---|---|
| Torres 29' | Report | Martinelli 5'; Nketiah 66'; Nelson 80' |

Exploria Stadium, Orlando, Florida
Attendance: 19,738
Referee: Kevin Broadley (United States)

23 July 2022
20:00 EDT
FC Series

| Arsenal (England) | 4–0 | (England) Chelsea |
|---|---|---|
| Gabriel Jesus 15'; Ødegaard 36'; Saka 66'; Sambi Lokonga 90+2' | Report |

Camping World Stadium, Orlando, Florida
Attendance: 63,811
Referee: Kevin Broadley (United States)

== Broadcasters ==
| Territory | Broadcaster | Ref. |
|---|---|---|
| Australia | Paramount+ | |
| India | SonyLiv/Sony Ten 2 | |
| Indonesia | O Channel | |
| Mexico | TUDN | |
| United States | ESPN+ | |
| Vietnam | FPT | |
