= Soccer Champions Tour =

- Founded: 2023; 3 years ago
- First season: July 22, 2023
- Country: United States
- Number of clubs: 5-6
- Level on pyramid: Exhibition
- Broadcaster(s): ESPN (2023), DirecTV (since 2024)
- Website: www.soccerchampionstour.com

The Soccer Champions Tour is an annual pre-season exhibition series in which top European football clubs play friendly matches across the United States in the second half of July and the first week of August. The tour was launched in 2023 by the global investment firm Sixth Street, with the events agency AEG Worldwide handling delivery on the ground.

Six European clubs played the inaugural 2023 edition. Real Madrid, Barcelona, Juventus, AC Milan, Arsenal and Manchester United split eight matches across six US cities. The 2024 line-up was tighter. Manchester City and Chelsea took the places of Juventus, Arsenal and Manchester United alongside the returning Spanish pair and AC Milan, and the six fixtures moved east.

Most US sports press treats the tour as the heir to the International Champions Cup, which ran annually from 2013 to 2019 under Relevent Sports before the COVID-19 pandemic paused it. The ICC never came back. Both series fit into the wider push by European clubs to grow a North American fan base before the 2026 FIFA World Cup.

== History ==
European clubs had been touring the United States in pre-season since the early 2000s, but the format was reset by the International Champions Cup. Launched in 2013 by Relevent Sports and the media group around the Ross family, the ICC ran annually through 2019 before the COVID-19 pandemic shut it down.

Sixth Street announced the new tour in May 2023 as a multi-year platform. The inaugural season ran from July 22 to August 2, 2023, with eight matches across six US cities. AT&T Stadium in Arlington, Texas hosted the headline fixture. Real Madrid played Barcelona on American soil for the first time, in what organisers and the trade press called the first El Clásico of any consequence outside Spain. Three other matches carried weight. Manchester United and Real Madrid had not faced each other since 2018. Barcelona and Arsenal replayed their 2006 European Cup final. AC Milan and Juventus, despite more than 120 years of history each, had never met outside Europe.

The 2024 tour ran from July 27 to August 6 with five clubs and six matches. Manchester City and Chelsea came in for the three departing English and Italian sides while Real Madrid, Barcelona and AC Milan returned. Host cities shifted east to New York, East Rutherford, New Jersey, Chicago, Orlando, Baltimore and Charlotte. Real Madrid edged Chelsea 2-1 at Bank of America Stadium in the closer. The Real-Milan and Barcelona-Milan fixtures finished level. So did the MetLife Stadium El Clásico, 2-2.

Sixth Street added a women's strand to the 2024 schedule. Top European women's clubs played friendlies alongside the men's calendar.

== Format ==
Each edition is a set of exhibition friendlies played at major-league venues normally used by NFL, MLB and MLS franchises. Matches are 90 minutes with unlimited substitutions and no points table or trophy. Fixtures are arranged so that every club plays at least two opponents, and so that traditional rivalries (most notably El Clásico) are staged at least once per edition.

== Editions ==
Soccer Champions Tour men's editions
Year	Dates	Clubs	Matches	Host cities
2023	July 22 - August 2	Real Madrid, Barcelona, Juventus, AC Milan, Arsenal, Manchester United	8	Dallas, Houston, Las Vegas, Los Angeles, Orlando, San Francisco
2024	July 27 - August 6	Real Madrid, Barcelona, AC Milan, Manchester City, Chelsea	6	New York, East Rutherford, Chicago, Orlando, Baltimore, Charlotte

== Attendance and reception ==
World Soccer Talk reported that the 2023 tour set new crowd records for European pre-season football in the United States. The El Clásico at AT&T Stadium drew just over 82,000 spectators, a record for any El Clásico played outside Spain and a record football crowd at the venue. Real Madrid posted the highest average attendance of any touring club in the 2023 US summer, 71,036 spectators across four matches. Three of the eight 2023 fixtures sold out the host stadiums, in Arlington, Los Angeles and Orlando.

== Broadcasting ==
ESPN held the US linear and streaming rights for the 2023 inaugural edition, with matches running on the ESPN family of networks and on ESPN+. For 2024 the tour brought in DirecTV as title sponsor and US distributor. The matches were bundled into DirecTV's wider sports package. International rights stayed with the participating clubs. European sides streamed matches on their own channels in their home markets.

== See also ==
- International Champions Cup
- Florida Cup
- Premier League Summer Series
- 2026 FIFA World Cup
