= 2019 Florida Cup =

Tournament details
- Host country: United States
- Dates: January 10 – 12
- Teams: 4 (from 2 confederations)
- Venues: 2 (in 2 host cities)

Final positions
- Champions: (Brazil) Flamengo (1st title)

Tournament statistics
- Matches played: 4
- Goals scored: 14 (3.5 per match)
- Top scorer(s): (Colombia) Fernando Uribe (2 goals)

The 2019 Florida Cup was the fifth edition of Florida Cup, a friendly association football tournament played in the United States. The competition is partnered with Universal Orlando Resort.

== Teams ==
Nation	Team	Location	Confederation	League
Brazil	São Paulo	São Paulo	CONMEBOL	Campeonato Brasileiro Série A
Brazil	Flamengo	Rio de Janeiro	CONMEBOL	Campeonato Brasileiro Série A
Germany	Eintracht Frankfurt	Frankfurt	UEFA	Bundesliga
Netherlands	Ajax	Amsterdam	UEFA	Eredivisie

== Venues ==
Orlando	St. Petersburg
Orlando City Stadium	Al Lang Stadium
Capacity: 25,500	Capacity: 7,227
Location of Florida in the United States.	Location of the host cities of the 2019 Florida Cup in Florida.

== Standings ==
Pos	Team	Pld	W	PW	PL	L	GF	GA	GD	Pts	Final result
1	(Brazil) Flamengo (C)	2	1	1	0	0	3	2	+1	5	Florida Cup winners
2	(Netherlands) Ajax	2	1	0	1	0	6	4	+2	4	
3	(Germany) Eintracht Frankfurt	2	1	0	0	1	2	2	0	3	
4	(Brazil) São Paulo	2	0	0	0	2	3	6	−3	0	

Source: Florida Cup
Rules for classification: 1) Points; 2) Wins; 3) Goal differential; 4) Goals scored; 5) Head-to-head result; 6) Disciplinary points.
(C) Champion

== Matches ==
January 10, 2019
19:00 EST (UTC−5)

Ajax (Netherlands)	2–2	(Brazil) Flamengo
Huntelaar 16'; Labyad 34'	Report	Uribe 19', 43'
Penalties
Labyad (penalty scored); Traoré (penalty scored); De Wit (penalty scored); Veltman (penalty missed); Magallán (penalty missed)	3–4	(penalty scored) Piris da Motta; (penalty scored) Rodinei; (penalty scored) Trauco; (penalty scored) Berrío

Orlando City Stadium, Orlando
Referee: Estaban Rosano (United States)

January 10, 2019
19:00 EST (UTC−5)

Eintracht Frankfurt (Germany)	2–1	(Brazil) São Paulo
Rebić 9' (pen.); Igor Vinícius 64' (o.g.)	Report	Nenê 55'

Al Lang Stadium, St. Petersburg
Referee: Andrew Musashe (United States)

January 12, 2019
13:00 EST (UTC−5)

São Paulo (Brazil)	2–4	(Netherlands) Ajax
Hernanes 22'; Brenner 65'	Report	Van de Beek 57'; Tadić 73' (pen.); Dolberg 79'; Neres 90+1'

Orlando City Stadium, Orlando
Referee: Elvis Osmanovic (United States)

January 12, 2019
16:00 EST (UTC−5)

Flamengo (Brazil)	1–0	(Germany) Eintracht Frankfurt
Jean Lucas 40'	Report

Orlando City Stadium, Orlando
Referee: Madzid Coric (United States)
