= Inter&Co =

Brazilian fintech company

Inter&Co, Inc.
- Type: Public
- Traded as: Nasdaq: INTR; B3: INBR32
- Industry: Financial services; fintech
- Predecessor: Banco Inter S.A. (formerly Banco Intermedium S.A.)
- Founded: 1994; 32 years ago in Belo Horizonte, Brazil (as Intermedium CFI)
- Founders: Rubens Menin and the Menin family
- Headquarters: Belo Horizonte, Minas Gerais, Brazil
- Area served: Brazil, United States
- Key people: Rubens Menin (Chairman); João Vitor Menin (Global CEO); Alexandre Riccio (CEO, Inter Brazil)
- Subsidiaries: Banco Inter S.A.; Inter&Co Payments, Inc.; Inter Securities LLC; Inter DTVM
- Website: inter.co

Inter&Co is a Brazilian fintech company based in Belo Horizonte, Minas Gerais. It is active in Brazil and the United States.

== History ==
Inter&Co was co-founded on January 26, 1994, by Brazilian billionaire Rubens Menin in Belo Horizonte, Brazil. Originally established as a traditional bank in the 1990s, the company transitioned into a digital bank by 2015. Since then, it has expanded its offerings beyond traditional banking services to include a digital banking super app, which provides services such as money transfers, bill payments, savings, investments, and shopping rewards.

In 2023, Inter&Co set up its U.S. headquarters in Miami and completed the acquisition of Granito in 2024 to enhance its operations in the U.S. market. On July 17, 2024, Alexandre Riccio was appointed as CEO of Inter&Co Brazil, with João Vitor Menin transitioning to the Global CEO role.

On September 14, 2023, Inter&Co announced a partnership with Orlando City SC and Orlando Pride to become their official financial services provider. This marked the company's first collaboration with an NWSL club and its second with an MLS team, following a partnership with New York City FC in 2022. As part of this initiative, Exploria Stadium was renamed Inter & Co Stadium under a one-year naming rights agreement. This made Inter&Co the first Latin American financial institution to secure naming rights for a major U.S. stadium. On July 23, 2026, it was announced that the stadium would be renamed to Inter.co Stadium.

According to data cited by CNN Brasil in 2025, Inter&Co became the most searched Brazilian banking brand in the United States on Google.
