= 2024 Florida Cup =

Tenth edition of Florida Cup

Tournament details
- Host country: United States
- Dates: July 23 – August 3
- Teams: 5 (from 1 confederation)
- Venue: 4 (in 4 host cities)

Tournament statistics
- Matches played: 4
- Goals scored: 22 (5.5 per match)
- Top scorer(s): Erling Haaland (Manchester City; 5 goals)

The 2024 Florida Cup was the tenth edition of the Florida Cup, a friendly association football tournament played in the United States. It was contested from July 23 to August 3, 2024. For the third year, the tournament was not a true friendly cup competition but rather a series of friendlies referred to as the FC Series.

The series featured Manchester City playing against four other teams over the course of the series, including Celtic, Milan, Barcelona, and Chelsea. Additionally, two friendlies organized by the FC Series but not as part of the series proper featured Chelsea play Celtic and América. Two of the FC Series games were also part of a larger Soccer Champions Tour.

== Teams ==
| Nation | Team | Location | Confederation | League |
|---|---|---|---|---|
| England | Manchester City | Manchester | UEFA | Premier League |
| England | Chelsea | London | UEFA | Premier League |
| Scotland | Celtic | Glasgow | UEFA | Scottish Premiership |
| Italy | Milan | Milan | UEFA | Serie A |
| Spain | Barcelona | Barcelona | UEFA | La Liga |
| Mexico | América (Note: América only participated in one match that was not officially part of the 2024 FC Series.) | Mexico City | CONCACAF | Liga MX |

== Venues ==
Location of the host cities of the 2024 Florida Cup.

FC Series

| Chapel Hill, North Carolina | New York, New York |
|---|---|
| Kenan Memorial Stadium | Yankee Stadium |
| Capacity: 50,500 | Capacity: 47,309 |
| Orlando, Florida | Columbus, Ohio |
| Camping World Stadium | Ohio Stadium |
| Capacity: 65,000 | Capacity: 102,780 |

Non-series friendlies

| Notre Dame, Indiana | Atlanta, Georgia |
|---|---|
| Notre Dame Stadium | Mercedes-Benz Stadium |
| Capacity: 77,622 | Capacity: 50,500 |

== Matches ==
FC Series

23 July 2024
19:00 EDT
FC Series

| Manchester City (England) | 3–4 | (Scotland) Celtic |
|---|---|---|
| Bobb 33'; Perrone 46'; Haaland 57' | Man. City Report; Celtic Report | Kühn 13', 36'; Furuhashi 44'; Palma 68' |

Kenan Memorial Stadium, Chapel Hill, North Carolina
Referee: Ted Unkel (United States)

27 July 2024
18:00 EDT
FC Series
Soccer Champions Tour

| Manchester City (England) | 2–3 | (Italy) Milan |
|---|---|---|
| Haaland 19'; McAtee 55' | Man. City Report; Milan Report | Colombo 30', 34'; Nasti 78' |

Yankee Stadium, New York, New York
Attendance: 46,122
Referee: Serhiy Boyko (Ukraine)

30 July 2024
19:00 EDT
FC Series
Soccer Champions Tour

| Barcelona (Spain) | 2–2 | (England) Manchester City |
|---|---|---|
| Víctor 24'; Torre 45+2' | Barcelona Report; Man. City Report | O'Reilly 39'; Grealish 60' |
Penalties
| Lewandowski (penalty scored); Darvich (penalty scored); Balde (penalty scored); T. Fernández (penalty scored) | 4–1 | (penalty missed) Phillips; (penalty missed) Wright; (penalty scored) Fatah |

Camping World Stadium, Orlando, Florida
Attendance: 63,237
Referee: Tim Ford (United States)

3 August 2024
17:30 EDT
FC Series

| Manchester City (England) | 4–2 | (England) Chelsea |
|---|---|---|
| Haaland 4' (pen.), 5', 56'; Bobb 55' | Man. City Report; Chelsea Report | Sterling 59'; Madueke 89' |

Ohio Stadium, Columbus, Ohio
Attendance: 71,280
Referee: Ted Unkel (United States)

Non-series friendlies

27 July 2024
16:00 EDT

| Chelsea (England) | 1–4 | (Scotland) Celtic |
|---|---|---|
| Nkunku 89' (pen.) | Chelsea Report; Celtic Report | O'Riley 19'; Furuhashi 33'; Palma 76'; M. Johnston 79' |

Notre Dame Stadium, Notre Dame, Indiana

31 July 2024
19:00 EDT

| Chelsea (England) | 3–0 | (Mexico) América |
|---|---|---|
| Nkunku 3' (pen.); Guiu 21'; Madueke 79' (pen.) | Chelsea Report |

Mercedes-Benz Stadium, Atlanta, Georgia
Referee: Malik Badawi (United States)
