= Florida Cup (soccer) =

- Founded: 2015; 11 years ago
- Region: Florida, United States (mainly)
- Teams: 4 – 12
- Current champions: (England) Chelsea (1st title)
- Website: fcseries.com
- 2024 Florida Cup

The Florida Cup (also known as the FC Series) is an annual club association football friendly exhibition competition that is held in the state of Florida, United States. Introduced in 2015, the competition has featured international clubs of the top 100 in the European rankings and the top 50 in the South American rankings.

In its present form, the event winner can be decided by aggregate points or through a final playoff format match. The format of the event varies each year according to the schedules of the participating clubs' league schedules.

== Editions ==
Florida Cup / FC Series

| Year | Winners | Runners-up | Third place | Fourth place |
|---|---|---|---|---|
| 2015 | (Germany) 1. FC Köln (1) | (Germany) Bayer Leverkusen | (Brazil) Corinthians | (Brazil) Fluminense |
| 2016 | (Brazil) Atlético Mineiro (1) | (Germany) Bayer Leverkusen | (Brazil) Internacional | (Brazil) Corinthians |
| 2017 | (Brazil) São Paulo (1) | (Brazil) Corinthians | (Brazil) Vasco da Gama | (Argentina) River Plate |
| 2018 | (Colombia) Atlético Nacional (1) | (Ecuador) Barcelona SC | (Scotland) Rangers | (Netherlands) PSV Eindhoven |
| 2019 | (Brazil) Flamengo(1) | (Netherlands) Ajax | (Germany) Eintracht Frankfurt | (Brazil) São Paulo |
| 2020 | (Brazil) Palmeiras (1) | (Colombia) Atlético Nacional | (Brazil) Corinthians | (United States) New York City FC |
| 2021 | (England) Everton (1) | (Colombia) Millonarios | (Colombia) Atlético Nacional | (Mexico) UNAM |
| 2022 | (England) Arsenal (1) | (England) Chelsea | (United States) Charlotte FC | (Mexico) América |
| 2023 | (England) Chelsea (1) | (Wales) Wrexham | No third or fourth place | |
| 2024 | No rankings | | | |
| 2025 | TBD | | | |

Soccer Champions Tour (supported by the Florida Cup)

| Year | Winners | Runners-up |
|---|---|---|
| 2023 | Juventus (1) | Real Madrid |
| 2024 | None | None |

== Records and statistics ==
Performances and participation by nation
| Nation | Winners | Runners-up | Third place | Fourth place | Participations |
|---|---|---|---|---|---|
| Brazil | 4 (2016, 2017, 2019, 2020) | 1 (2017) | 4 (2015, 2016, 2017, 2020) | 3 (2015, 2016, 2019) | 6 (2015, 2016, 2017, 2018, 2019, 2020) |
| England | 3 (2021, 2022, 2023) | 1 (2022) | 0 | 0 | 3 (2021, 2022, 2023) |
| Germany | 1 (2015) | 2 (2015, 2016) | 1 (2019) | 0 | 4 (2015, 2016, 2017, 2019) |
| Colombia | 1 (2018) | 2 (2020, 2021) | 1 (2021) | 0 | 4 (2017, 2018, 2020, 2021) |
| Netherlands | 0 | 1 (2019) | 0 | 1 (2018) | 2 (2018, 2019) |
| Ecuador | 0 | 1 (2018) | 0 | 0 | 2 (2017, 2018) |
| Wales | 0 | 1 (2023) | 0 | 0 | 1 (2023) |
| United States | 0 | 0 | 1 (2022) | 1 (2020) | 3 (2017, 2020, 2022) |
| Scotland | 0 | 0 | 1 (2018) | 0 | 1 (2018) |
| Argentina | 0 | 0 | 0 | 1 (2017) | 1 (2017) |
| Mexico | 0 | 0 | 0 | 2 (2021, 2022) | 2 (2021, 2022) |

Top goalscorers
| Player | Nation | Team(s) | Participations | Goals |
|---|---|---|---|---|
| Nenê | Brazil | (Brazil) São Paulo (Brazil) Vasco da Gama | 2 (2017, 2019) | 3 |
| Javier Hernández | Mexico | (Germany) Bayer Leverkusen | 2 (2016, 2017) | 3 |
| Luan Vieira | Brazil | (Brazil) Corinthians | 1 (2020) | 2 |
| Fernando Uribe | Colombia | (Brazil) Flamengo | 1 (2019) | 2 |
| Rodriguinho | Brazil | (Brazil) Corinthians | 1 (2018) | 2 |
| Aldo Leão Ramírez | Colombia | (Colombia) Atlético Nacional | 1 (2018) | 2 |
| Alfredo Morelos | Colombia | (Scotland) Rangers | 1 (2018) | 2 |
| Sam Lammers | Netherlands | (Netherlands) PSV Eindhoven | 1 (2018) | 2 |
| Jonathan Betancourt | Ecuador | (Ecuador) Barcelona SC | 1 (2018) | 2 |
| Robert Herrmann | Germany | (Germany) VfL Wolfsburg | 1 (2017) | 2 |
| Ángel Romero | Paraguay | (Brazil) Corinthians | 1 (2016) | 2 |
| Paolo Guerrero | Peru | (Brazil) Corinthians | 1 (2015) | 2 |
| Ian Maatsen | Netherlands | (England) Chelsea | 1 (2023) | 2 |
