= 2026 Superliga Colombiana =

Junior	Santa Fe
1	4

First leg
Junior	Santa Fe
1	1
- Date: 15 January 2026
- Venue: Estadio Metropolitano Roberto Meléndez, Barranquilla
- Referee: Luis Delgado

Second leg
Santa Fe	Junior
3	0
- Date: 21 January 2026
- Venue: Estadio El Campín, Bogotá
- Referee: Jairo Mayorga

The 2026 Superliga Colombiana (officially known as the Superliga BetPlay Dimayor 2026 for sponsorship purposes) was the fifteenth edition of the Superliga Colombiana, Colombia's football super cup tournament organized by DIMAYOR. It was contested by Santa Fe and Junior, champions of the 2025 Liga DIMAYOR tournaments, from 15 to 21 January 2026.

Santa Fe defeated Junior 4–1 on aggregate over two legs to win their fifth Superliga Colombiana title.

== Teams ==
The 2026 Superliga Colombiana was played by Santa Fe, champions of the 2025 Apertura tournament, and Junior, champions of the 2025 Finalización tournament. This was the fifth appearance in the competition for both Santa Fe and Junior, however, whilst the former won the title in all of its previous attempts, the latter won the Superliga in two of its four previous appearances (in 2019 and 2020).

Team	Qualification	Previous appearances (bold indicates winners)
Santa Fe	2025 Apertura champions	4 (**2013**, **2015**, **2017**, **2021**)
Junior	2025 Finalización champions	4 (2012, **2019**, **2020**, 2024)

== Matches ==
Although Junior were entitled to host the second leg for being the higher-placed team in the aggregate table of the 2025 season, they switched the order of legs to be able to use their home stadium prior to its closure for remodeling works.

=== First leg ===
15 January 2026
19:30 UTC−5

Junior	1–1	Santa Fe
Gutiérrez 74'	Report	Rodallega 45+6'

Estadio Metropolitano Roberto Meléndez, Barranquilla
Attendance: 24,709
Referee: Luis Delgado

**Junior**	**Santa Fe**

GK	1	(Uruguay) Mauro Silveira
RB	34	(Colombia) Jhomier Guerrero
CB	98	(Colombia) Jermein Peña
CB	33	(Uruguay) Lucas Monzón
LB	26	(Colombia) Yeison Suárez		(substituted off) 90+5'
CM	28	(Colombia) Guillermo Celis	(yellow card) 35'	(substituted off) 70'
CM	22	(Colombia) Jesús Rivas
AM	8	(Colombia) Yimmi Chará (c)		(substituted off) 54'
RW	10	(Colombia) Jannenson Sarmiento		(substituted off) 46'
LW	88	(Colombia) Bryan Castrillón		(substituted off) 54'
CF	9	(Paraguay) Guillermo Paiva	(yellow card) 52'
Substitutes:
GK	30	(Colombia) Jefersson Martínez
DF	3	(Colombia) Edwin Herrera		(substituted on) 90+5'
DF	5	(Colombia) Daniel Rivera
DF	27	(Colombia) Jhon Navia		(substituted on) 70'
MF	6	(Colombia) Dilan Villarreal
MF	18	(Colombia) Kevin Pérez		(substituted on) 54'
MF	80	(Colombia) Fabián Ángel
FW	21	(Colombia) Joel Canchimbo		(substituted on) 46'
FW	29	(Colombia) Teófilo Gutiérrez	(yellow card) 76' (yellow-red card) 90+12'	(substituted on) 54'
Manager:
(Uruguay) Alfredo Arias

GK	1	(Colombia) Andrés Mosquera		(substituted off) 69'
RB	13	(Colombia) Helibelton Palacios	(yellow card) 65'
CB	3	(Colombia) Víctor Moreno
CB	18	(Argentina) Emanuel Olivera
LB	32	(Colombia) Christian Mafla
RM	21	(Colombia) Ewil Murillo
CM	20	(Colombia) Yilmar Velásquez
LM	16	(Colombia) Daniel Torres	(yellow card) 42'	(substituted off) 66'
RW	14	(Colombia) Luis Palacios		(substituted off) 80'
LW	10	(Colombia) Omar Fernández	(yellow card) 68'
FW	11	(Colombia) Hugo Rodallega (c)		(substituted off) 81'
Substitutes:
GK	12	(Colombia) Weimar Asprilla		(substituted on) 69'
DF	15	(Colombia) Iván Scarpeta
DF	27	(Colombia) Yeicar Perlaza		(substituted on) 81'
MF	6	(Colombia) Kilian Toscano		(substituted on) 66'
MF	10	(Colombia) Alexis Zapata
FW	9	(Uruguay) Franco Fagúndez
FW	19	(Argentina) Nahuel Bustos		(substituted on) 80'
FW	40	(Colombia) Martín Palacios
Manager:
(Uruguay) Pablo Repetto

Assistant referees:
Richard Ortiz
Jonathan Paniagua
Fourth official:
Carlos Márquez
Video assistant referee:
Luis Picón
Assistant video assistant referee:
Jhon León

**Match rules**

- 90 minutes.
- Nine named substitutes.
- Maximum of five substitutions.

Statistics
	Junior	Santa Fe
Goals scored	1	1
Total shots	14	8
Shots on target	3	3
Ball possession	66.4%	33.6%
Corner kicks	7	7
Fouls committed	18	18
Offsides	2	3
Yellow cards	3	3
Red cards	1	0

=== Second leg ===
21 January 2026
19:30 UTC−5

Santa Fe	3–0	Junior
Murillo 5'; Rodallega 45+3'; Bustos 90+4'	Report

Estadio El Campín, Bogotá
Attendance: 30,398
Referee: Jairo Mayorga

**Santa Fe**	**Junior**

GK	1	(Colombia) Andrés Mosquera	(yellow card) 90+3'
RB	13	(Colombia) Helibelton Palacios
CB	3	(Colombia) Víctor Moreno
CB	18	(Argentina) Emanuel Olivera
LB	32	(Colombia) Christian Mafla
RM	21	(Colombia) Ewil Murillo	(yellow card) 83'	(substituted off) 89'
CM	20	(Colombia) Yilmar Velásquez		(substituted off) 65'
LM	16	(Colombia) Daniel Torres	(yellow card) 2'
RW	14	(Colombia) Luis Palacios
LW	10	(Colombia) Omar Fernández		(substituted off) 75'
FW	11	(Colombia) Hugo Rodallega (c)	(yellow card) 58'	(substituted off) 89'
Substitutes:
GK	12	(Colombia) Weimar Asprilla
DF	15	(Colombia) Iván Scarpeta
DF	37	(Colombia) Jhon Rentería
MF	7	(Colombia) Jhojan Torres		(substituted on) 89'
MF	10	(Colombia) Alexis Zapata	(yellow card) 72'	(substituted on) 65'
FW	9	(Uruguay) Franco Fagúndez
FW	19	(Argentina) Nahuel Bustos		(substituted on) 89'
FW	22	(Colombia) Edwin Mosquera		(substituted on) 75'
FW	40	(Colombia) Martín Palacios
Manager:
(Uruguay) Pablo Repetto

GK	1	(Uruguay) Mauro Silveira
RB	3	(Colombia) Edwin Herrera	(yellow card) 45+1'	(substituted off) 46'
CB	98	(Colombia) Jermein Peña	(yellow card) 30'
CB	5	(Colombia) Daniel Rivera
LB	26	(Colombia) Yeison Suárez
CM	28	(Colombia) Guillermo Celis	(yellow card) 78'	(substituted off) 81'
CM	14	(Colombia) Juan David Ríos		(substituted off) 46'
RM	34	(Colombia) Jhomier Guerrero
LM	21	(Colombia) Joel Canchimbo		(substituted off) 63'
AM	8	(Colombia) Yimmi Chará (c)
CF	9	(Paraguay) Guillermo Paiva	(yellow card) 88'
Substitutes:
GK	30	(Colombia) Jefersson Martínez
DF	16	(Colombia) Carlos Pérez
DF	27	(Colombia) Jhon Navia
MF	6	(Colombia) Dilan Villarreal
MF	20	(Colombia) Jannenson Sarmiento		(substituted on) 71'
MF	77	(Colombia) Cristian Barrios		(substituted on) 46'
MF	80	(Colombia) Fabián Ángel		(substituted on) 81'
FW	10	(Colombia) Luis Muriel		(substituted on) 46'
FW	88	(Colombia) Bryan Castrillón		(substituted on) 63'	(substituted off) 71'
Manager:
(Uruguay) Alfredo Arias

Assistant referees:
Juan García
Jorge Sanna
Fourth official:
José Bautista
Video assistant referee:
Fernando Acuña
Assistant video assistant referee:
Mario Tarache

**Match rules**

- 90 minutes.
- Penalty shoot-out if tied on aggregate.
- Nine named substitutes.
- Maximum of five substitutions.

Statistics
	Santa Fe	Junior
Goals scored	3	0
Total shots	13	15
Shots on target	6	4
Ball possession	29.3%	70.7%
Corner kicks	2	7
Fouls committed	16	8
Offsides	1	2
Yellow cards	5	4
Red cards	0	0

Santa Fe won 4–1 on aggregate.

Superliga Colombiana
2026 champions

**5th title**
