= 2024 Superliga Colombiana =

Junior	Millonarios
1	2

First leg
Junior	Millonarios
1	0
- Date: 18 January 2024
- Venue: Estadio Metropolitano Roberto Meléndez, Barranquilla
- Referee: Diego Ruiz

Second leg
Millonarios	Junior
2	0
- Date: 24 January 2024
- Venue: Estadio El Campín, Bogotá
- Referee: Wilmar Roldán

The 2024 Superliga Colombiana (officially known as the Superliga BetPlay Dimayor 2024 for sponsorship purposes) was the thirteenth edition of the Superliga Colombiana, Colombia's football super cup tournament organized by DIMAYOR. It was contested by Millonarios and Junior, champions of the 2023 Categoría Primera A season tournaments, from 18 to 24 January 2024.

Millonarios defeated Junior by a 2–1 score on aggregate to claim their second Superliga Colombiana title.

== Teams ==
The 2024 Superliga Colombiana was played by Millonarios, champions of the 2023 Apertura tournament, and Junior, champions of the 2023 Finalización tournament. This was the third appearance for Millonarios in the competition, losing to Santa Fe in 2013 but beating Atlético Nacional to win their first title in 2018, whilst this was Junior's fourth Superliga appearance, with a runner-up finish in 2012 and back-to-back titles in 2019 and 2020.

Team	Qualification	Previous appearances (bold indicates winners)
Millonarios	2023 Apertura champions	2 (2013, **2018**)
Junior	2023 Finalización champions	3 (2012, **2019**, **2020**)

== Matches ==
=== First leg ===
18 January 2024
20:00 UTC−5

Junior	1–0	Millonarios
Bacca 75' (pen.)	Report

Estadio Metropolitano Roberto Meléndez, Barranquilla
Attendance: 34,196
Referee: Diego Ruiz

**Junior**	**Millonarios**

GK	77	(Uruguay) Santiago Mele
RB	21	(Colombia) Walmer Pacheco	(yellow card) 49'	(substituted off) 83'
CB	28	(Colombia) Jermein Peña	(yellow card) 35'
CB	18	(Argentina) Emanuel Olivera
LB	12	(Colombia) Gabriel Fuentes
RCM	6	(Colombia) Didier Moreno	(yellow card) 11'
LCM	24	(Colombia) Víctor Cantillo		(substituted off) 63'
AM	8	(Colombia) Yimmi Chará
RW	99	(Colombia) José Enamorado	(yellow card) 39'	(substituted off) 63'
LW	20	(Colombia) Déiber Caicedo		(substituted off) 76'
CF	70	(Colombia) Carlos Bacca (c)		(substituted off) 76'
Substitutes:
GK	30	(Colombia) Jefersson Martínez
DF	3	(Colombia) Edwin Herrera		(substituted on) 83'
MF	7	(Colombia) Léider Berrío
MF	14	(Colombia) Homer Martínez		(substituted on) 63'
MF	15	(Colombia) Bryan Castrillón		(substituted on) 76'
MF	16	(Colombia) Vladimir Hernández		(substituted on) 63'
FW	17	(Colombia) Marco Pérez		(substituted on) 76'
Manager:
(Colombia) Arturo Reyes

GK	31	(Colombia) Álvaro Montero
RB	22	(Venezuela) Delvin Alfonzo
CB	26	(Colombia) Andrés Llinás
CB	17	(Colombia) Jorge Arias
LB	20	(Colombia) Danovis Banguero	(yellow card) 27'
RCM	8	(Colombia) Daniel Giraldo
LCM	5	(Colombia) Larry Vásquez		(substituted off) 84'
AM	14	(Colombia) David Silva (c)		(substituted off) 69'
RW	25	(Colombia) Luis Paredes		(substituted off) 55'
LW	11	(Colombia) Beckham Castro		(substituted off) 70'
CF	23	(Colombia) Leonardo Castro
Substitutes:
GK	12	(Colombia) Diego Novoa
DF	3	(Colombia) Omar Bertel		(substituted on) 84'
DF	6	(Colombia) Óscar Vanegas
MF	28	(Colombia) Stiven Vega		(substituted on) 69'
FW	7	(Colombia) Yuber Quiñones		(substituted on) 70'	(substituted off) 84'
FW	15	(Colombia) Edgar Guerra		(substituted on) 55'
FW	32	(Argentina) Santiago Giordana		(substituted on) 84'
Manager:
(Colombia) Alberto Gamero

Assistant referees:
Cristian Aguirre
Víctor Wilchez
Fourth official:
Diego Ulloa
Video assistant referee:
Leonard Mosquera
Assistant video assistant referee:
John Gómez

**Match rules**

- 90 minutes.
- Seven named substitutes.
- Maximum of five substitutions.

Statistics
	Junior	Millonarios
Goals scored	1	0
Total shots	13	8
Shots on target	7	1
Ball possession	56.7%	43.3%
Corner kicks	4	7
Fouls committed	11	9
Offsides	2	0
Yellow cards	4	1
Red cards	0	0

=== Second leg ===
24 January 2024
20:00 UTC−5

Millonarios	2–0	Junior
Giordana 53'; L. Castro 83'	Report

Estadio El Campín, Bogotá
Attendance: 37,000
Referee: Wilmar Roldán

**Millonarios**	**Junior**

GK	31	(Colombia) Álvaro Montero
RB	22	(Venezuela) Delvin Alfonzo	(yellow card) 58'
CB	26	(Colombia) Andrés Llinás
CB	17	(Colombia) Jorge Arias
LB	20	(Colombia) Danovis Banguero		(substituted off) 39'
RM	15	(Colombia) Edgar Guerra		(substituted off) 80'
CM	8	(Colombia) Daniel Giraldo	(yellow card) 88'
CM	28	(Colombia) Stiven Vega	(yellow card) 44'	(substituted off) 79'
LM	14	(Colombia) David Silva (c)		(substituted off) 90+2'
CF	23	(Colombia) Leonardo Castro	(yellow card) 36'
CF	32	(Argentina) Santiago Giordana		(substituted off) 90+2'
Substitutes:
GK	12	(Colombia) Diego Novoa
DF	3	(Colombia) Omar Bertel		(substituted on) 39'
DF	6	(Colombia) Óscar Vanegas		(substituted on) 90+2'
MF	5	(Colombia) Larry Vásquez		(substituted on) 79'
FW	9	(Colombia) Juan Carvajal
FW	11	(Colombia) Beckham Castro		(substituted on) 80'
FW	42	(Colombia) Jhon Largacha		(substituted on) 90+2'
Manager:
(Colombia) Alberto Gamero

GK	77	(Uruguay) Santiago Mele
RB	21	(Colombia) Walmer Pacheco	(yellow card) 24'	(substituted off) 46'
CB	18	(Argentina) Emanuel Olivera	(yellow card) 42'
CB	28	(Colombia) Jermein Peña	(yellow card) 31'
LB	12	(Colombia) Gabriel Fuentes
RM	6	(Colombia) Didier Moreno (c)
CM	14	(Colombia) Homer Martínez		(substituted off) 85'
LM	24	(Colombia) Víctor Cantillo
RW	99	(Colombia) José Enamorado	(yellow card) 16'	(substituted off) 46'
LW	8	(Colombia) Yimmi Chará		(substituted off) 81'
CF	17	(Colombia) Marco Pérez		(substituted off) 69'
Substitutes:
GK	30	(Colombia) Jefersson Martínez
DF	3	(Colombia) Edwin Herrera		(substituted on) 46'
MF	10	(Venezuela) Luis González		(substituted on) 85'
MF	13	(Colombia) Jhon Vélez
MF	16	(Colombia) Vladimir Hernández		(substituted on) 46'
FW	20	(Colombia) Déiber Caicedo		(substituted on) 81'
FW	70	(Colombia) Carlos Bacca		(substituted on) 69'
Manager:
(Colombia) Arturo Reyes

Assistant referees:
Javier Patiño
Johan Peña
Fourth official:
David Espinosa
Video assistant referee:
Fernando Acuña
Assistant video assistant referee:
Luis Picón

**Match rules**

- 90 minutes.
- Penalty shoot-out if tied on aggregate.
- Seven named substitutes.
- Maximum of five substitutions.

Statistics
	Millonarios	Junior
Goals scored	2	0
Total shots	17	3
Shots on target	8	1
Ball possession	44.7%	55.3%
Corner kicks	7	2
Fouls committed	6	4
Offsides	1	2
Yellow cards	4	4
Red cards	0	0

Millonarios won 2–1 on aggregate.

Superliga Colombiana
2024 champions

**2nd title**
