= 2021–22 Everton F.C. season =

English football club season

Everton
2021–22 season
- Owner: Farhad Moshiri
- Chairman: Bill Kenwright
- Manager: Rafael Benítez (until 16 January 2022); Duncan Ferguson (caretaker, from 18 January to 31 January 2022); Frank Lampard (from 31 January 2022)
- Stadium: Goodison Park
- Premier League: 16th
- FA Cup: Quarter-Final
- EFL Cup: Third Round
- Top goalscorer: League: Richarlison (10); All: Richarlison (11)
- Highest home attendance: 39,641 vs Liverpool (1 December 2021, Premier League)
- Lowest home attendance: 38,203 vs Brighton (2 January 2022, Premier League), & vs Aston Villa (22 January 2022, Premier League)
- Average home league attendance: 38,886
Home colours	Away colours	Third colours

The 2021–22 Everton Football Club season was the club's 143rd season in existence and the club's 68th consecutive season in the top flight of English football. In addition to the domestic league, Everton participated in this season's editions of the FA Cup and the EFL Cup.

== Season summary ==
On 5 December 2021, director of football Marcel Brands left the club with immediate effect. He had been at Everton since May 2018.

== Kits ==
Home	Home Alt. 1	Home Alt. 2	Away

Away Alt.	Third	Third Alt.

== Squad ==
=== First team ===
Note: Flags indicate national team as defined under FIFA eligibility rules; some limited exceptions apply. Players may hold more than one non-FIFA nationality.

No.	Pos.	Nation	Player
1	GK	ENG	Jordan Pickford
2	DF	ENG	Jonjoe Kenny
3	DF	SCO	Nathan Patterson
4	DF	ENG	Mason Holgate
5	DF	ENG	Michael Keane
6	MF	BRA	Allan
7	FW	BRA	Richarlison
8	MF	ENG	Fabian Delph
9	FW	ENG	Dominic Calvert-Lewin
10	MF	ISL	Gylfi Sigurðsson
11	FW	ENG	Demarai Gray
13	DF	COL	Yerry Mina
14	FW	ENG	Andros Townsend
15	GK	BIH	Asmir Begović
16	MF	MLI	Abdoulaye Doucouré

No.	Pos.	Nation	Player
17	FW	NGR	Alex Iwobi
19	DF	UKR	Vitaliy Mykolenko
21	MF	POR	André Gomes
22	DF	ENG	Ben Godfrey
23	DF	IRL	Séamus Coleman (captain)
24	FW	ENG	Anthony Gordon
25	MF	CIV	Jean-Philippe Gbamin
26	MF	ENG	Tom Davies
28	FW	TUR	Cenk Tosun
31	GK	ENG	Andy Lonergan
32	DF	ENG	Jarrad Branthwaite
33	FW	VEN	Salomón Rondón
34	FW	NED	Anwar El Ghazi
36	FW	ENG	Dele Alli
50	FW	ENG	Ellis Simms

=== Out on loan ===
Note: Flags indicate national team as defined under FIFA eligibility rules; some limited exceptions apply. Players may hold more than one non-FIFA nationality.

No.	Pos.	Nation	Player
–	GK	POR	João Virgínia (at Sporting CP until 30 June 2022)
—	DF	FRA	Niels Nkounkou (at Standard Liège until 30 June 2022)

No.	Pos.	Nation	Player
—	FW	ITA	Moise Kean (at Juventus until 30 June 2023)

== Transfers ==
=== Transfers in ===
Date	Position	Nationality	Name	From	Fee	Team	Ref.
20 July 2021	FW	(England)	Andros Townsend	(England) Crystal Palace	Free	First team	
20 July 2021	GK	(Bosnia and Herzegovina)	Asmir Begović	(England) Bournemouth	Free	First team	
22 July 2021	FW	(England)	Demarai Gray	(Germany) Bayer Leverkusen	£1.7m	First team	
20 August 2021	GK	(England)	Andy Lonergan	Unattached	Free	First team	
31 August 2021	FW	(Venezuela)	Salomón Rondón	(China) Dalian Professional	Free	First team	
20 September 2021	FW	(England)	Francis Okoronkwo	(England) Sunderland	Undisclosed	Academy	
1 January 2022	DF	(Ukraine)	Vitaliy Mykolenko	(Ukraine) Dynamo Kyiv	£17m	First team	
4 January 2022	DF	(Scotland)	Nathan Patterson	(Scotland) Rangers	£12m	First team	
1 February 2022	AM	(England)	Dele Alli	(England) Tottenham Hotspur	Free	First team	
1 February 2022	GK	(England)	Billy Crellin	(England) Fleetwood Town	Undisclosed	Academy	
Total					£29.7m		

=== Transfers out ===
Date	Position	Nationality	Name	To	Fee	Team	Ref.
30 June 2021	MF	(England)	Dennis Adeniran	(England) Sheffield Wednesday	Free	Academy	
30 June 2021	MF	(Bosnia and Herzegovina)	Muhamed Besic	(Hungary) Ferencváros	Released	First team	
30 June 2021	FW	(Democratic Republic of the Congo)	Yannick Bolasie	(Turkey) Çaykur Rizespor	Released	First team	
30 June 2021	FW	(England)	Josh Bowler	(England) Blackpool	Free	Academy	
30 June 2021	MF	(England)	Bobby Carroll	(England) Chorley	Released	Academy	
30 June 2021	DF	(England)	Callum Connolly	(England) Blackpool	Free	Academy	
30 June 2021	GK	(Denmark)	Nicolas Defreitas-Hansen	(Wales) Swansea City	Free	Academy	
30 June 2021	FW	(Norway)	Joshua King	(England) Watford	Free	First team	
30 June 2021	DF	(England)	Daniel Lowey		Released	Academy	
30 June 2021	GK	(England)	Jack McIntyre	(England) Sunderland	Released	Academy	
30 June 2021	DF	(Australia)	Con Ouzounidis	(Denmark) Esbjerg	Free	Academy	
30 June 2021	DF	(England)	Matthew Pennington	(England) Shrewsbury Town	Free	Academy	
30 June 2021	DF	(England)	Dylan Thompson		Released	Academy	
30 June 2021	FW	(England)	Theo Walcott	(England) Southampton	Free	First team	
22 July 2021	FW	(Brazil)	Bernard	(United Arab Emirates) Sharjah	£850k	First team	
29 July 2021	MF	(Democratic Republic of the Congo)	Beni Baningime	(Scotland) Heart of Midlothian	Undisclosed	First team	
24 August 2021	DF	(England)	Thierry Small	(England) Southampton	Undisclosed	Academy	
25 August 2021	DF	(Netherlands)	Nathangelo Markelo	(Netherlands) PSV Eindhoven	Undisclosed	Academy	
22 September 2021	MF	(Colombia)	James Rodríguez	(Qatar) Al-Rayyan	£7.2m	First team	
13 January 2022	LB	(France)	Lucas Digne	(England) Aston Villa	£25m	First team	
Total					£33.05m		

=== Loans in ===
Date from	Position	Nationality	Name	From	Date until	Team	Ref.
13 January 2022	FW	(Netherlands)	Anwar El Ghazi	(England) Aston Villa	End of season	First team	
31 January 2022	CM	(Netherlands)	Donny van de Beek	(England) Manchester United	End of season	First team	

=== Loans out ===
Date from	Position	Nationality	Name	To	Date until	Team	Ref.
7 August 2021	CB	(England)	Lewis Gibson	(England) Sheffield Wednesday	End of season	Academy	
16 August 2021	FW	(Wales)	Nathan Broadhead	(England) Sunderland	End of season	Academy	
24 August 2021	GK	(Portugal)	João Virgínia	(Portugal) Sporting CP	End of season	First team	
31 August 2021	FW	(Italy)	Moise Kean	(Italy) Juventus	End of next season	First team	
31 August 2021	LB	(France)	Niels Nkounkou	(Belgium) Standard Liège	End of season	First team	
26 January 2022	CF	(England)	Ellis Simms	(Scotland) Heart of Midlothian	End of season	Academy	
31 January 2022	CM	(England)	Lewis Warrington	(England) Tranmere Rovers	End of season	Academy	
21 February 2022	DM	(Ivory Coast)	Jean-Philippe Gbamin	(Russia) CSKA Moscow	End of season	First team	

== Pre-season ==
10 July 2021 Friendly	Everton	3–0	Accrington Stanley	Halewood
15:00 BST	Cannon; Gibson; Gordon	Report		Stadium: USM Finch Farm; Attendance: 0 (Behind closed doors)

17 July 2021 Friendly	Everton	1–0	Blackburn Rovers	Halewood
12:00 BST	Gbamin 36'	Report		Stadium: USM Finch Farm; Attendance: 0 (Behind closed doors)

7 August 2021 Friendly	Manchester United	4–0	Everton	Trafford
12:45 BST	Greenwood 8'; Maguire 15'; Fernandes 29'; Dalot 90+2'	Report		Stadium: Old Trafford; Attendance: 55,000; Referee: Martin Atkinson

=== Florida Cup ===
Everton confirmed they would take part in the seventh edition of The Florida Cup in Orlando. Due to Arsenal's and Inter Milan's withdrawal from the pre-season tournament, The Toffees announced they would face Mexican side UNAM on 28 July.

25 July 2021 Florida Cup	Everton	1–1 (10–9 p)	Millonarios	Orlando, United States
18:00 EDT	Coleman (yellow card) 42'; Gray 64' (pen.)	Report	Llinás 19'; Pereira (yellow card) 43'	Stadium: Camping World Stadium; Referee: Elvis Osmanovic (United States)
	Penalties
	Keane (penalty scored); Gray (penalty scored); Gordon (penalty missed); Gomes (penalty scored); Broadhead (penalty scored); Gbamin (penalty scored); Gibson (penalty scored); Kenny (penalty scored); Davies (penalty scored); Anderson (penalty scored); Begović (penalty scored)		(penalty scored) Pereira; (penalty missed) Márquez; (penalty scored) Vargas; (penalty scored) Abadía; (penalty scored) Ruiz; (penalty scored) Guerra; (penalty scored) García; (penalty scored) Bertel; (penalty scored) Murillo; (penalty scored) Román; (penalty missed) Moreno

28 July 2021 Florida Cup	Everton	1–0	UNAM	Orlando, United States
18:00 EDT	Kean 19'	Report		Stadium: Camping World Stadium

== Competitions ==
=== Overview ===
Competition	First match	Last match	Starting round	Final position	Record							
Competition	First match	Last match	Starting round	Final position	Pld	W	D	L	GF	GA	GD	Win %
Premier League	14 August 2021	22 May 2022	Matchday 1	16th	38	11	6	21	43	66	−23	28.95
FA Cup	8 January 2022	20 March 2022	Third round	Quarter-finals	4	3	0	1	9	7	+2	75.00
EFL Cup	24 August 2021	21 September 2021	Second round	Third round	2	1	1	0	4	3	+1	50.00
Total					44	15	7	22	56	76	−20	34.09

Source: Soccerway

=== Premier League ===
==== League table ====
Pos	Team	Pld	W	D	L	GF	GA	GD	Pts	Qualification or relegation
14	Aston Villa	38	13	6	19	52	54	−2	45	
15	Southampton	38	9	13	16	43	67	−24	40	
16	Everton	38	11	6	21	43	66	−23	39	
17	Leeds United	38	9	11	18	42	79	−37	38	
18	Burnley (R)	38	7	14	17	34	53	−19	35	Relegation to EFL Championship

Source: Premier League
Rules for classification: 1) Points; 2) Goal difference; 3) Goals scored; 4) If the champions, relegated teams or qualified teams for UEFA competitions cannot be determined by rules 1 to 3, rules 4.1 to 4.3 are applied – 4.1) Points gained in head-to-head record between such teams; 4.2) Away goals scored in head-to-head record between such teams; 4.3) Play-offs
(R) Relegated

==== Results summary ====
Overall								Home						Away					
Pld	W	D	L	GF	GA	GD	Pts	W	D	L	GF	GA	GD	W	D	L	GF	GA	GD
38	11	6	21	43	66	−23	39	9	2	8	27	25	+2	2	4	13	16	41	−25

Source: Premier League

==== Results by matchday ====
Matchday	1	2	3	4	5	6	7	8	9	10	11	12	13	14	15	16	17	18	19	20	21	22	23	24	25	26	27	28	29	30	31	32	33	34	35	36	37	38
Ground	H	A	A	H	A	H	A	H	H	A	H	A	A	H	H	A	A	H	A	H	H	A	H	A	H	A	H	A	H	A	H	A	H	A	A	H	H	A
Result	W	D	W	W	L	W	D	L	L	L	D	L	L	L	W	L	D	D	L	W	L	L	L	L	W	L	L	L	L	L	W	L	W	W	D	L	W	L
Position	5	7	6	4	6	5	5	8	8	10	11	11	14	14	12	14	14	15	15	15	15	16	16	16	16	16	17	17	17	17	17	18	18	16	16	16	16	16

Source: Premier League
A = Away; H = Home; W = Win; D = Draw; L = Loss

==== Matches ====
The league fixtures were revealed on 16 June 2021.

14 August 2021 1	Everton	3–1	Southampton	Walton, Liverpool
15:00 BST	Richarlison (yellow card) 30' (goal) 47'; Doucouré 76' (yellow card) 77'; Calvert-Lewin 81'	Report	A. Armstrong 22'	Stadium: Goodison Park; Attendance: 38,487; Referee: Andy Madley

21 August 2021 2	Leeds United	2–2	Everton	Leeds
15:00 BST	Cooper (yellow card) 28'; Bamford (yellow card) 37'; Klich 41'; Raphinha 72'	Report	Calvert-Lewin 30' (pen.); Mina (yellow card) 37'; Gray 50'; Digne (yellow card) 68'; Coleman (yellow card) 77'; Doucouré (yellow card) 82'	Stadium: Elland Road; Attendance: 36,293; Referee: Darren England

28 August 2021 3	Brighton & Hove Albion	0–2	Everton	Falmer
15:00 BST	Bissouma (yellow card) 61'	Report	Gray 41'; Calvert-Lewin 58' (pen.); Richarlison (yellow card) 62'; Pickford (yellow card) 83'	Stadium: American Express Community Stadium; Attendance: 30,548; Referee: Jonathan Moss

13 September 2021 4	Everton	3–1	Burnley	Walton, Liverpool
20:00 BST	Townsend (yellow card) 53', (goal) 65'; Keane 60'; Gray 66'	Report	Brownhill (yellow card) 47'; Mee 53'	Stadium: Goodison Park; Attendance: 38,354; Referee: Martin Atkinson

18 September 2021 5	Aston Villa	3–0	Everton	Aston, Birmingham
17:30 BST	Cash 66'; Digne 69' (o.g.); Bailey 75', (yellow card) 76'	Report	Godfrey (yellow card) 72'	Stadium: Villa Park; Attendance: 41,888; Referee: Craig Pawson

25 September 2021 6	Everton	2–0	Norwich City	Walton, Liverpool
15:00 BST	Townsend 29' (pen.); Digne (yellow card) 56'; Doucoure 77'; Gordon (yellow card) 90+2'	Report	Kabak (yellow card) 54'; Lees-Melou (yellow card) 80'; Williams (yellow card) 84'	Stadium: Goodison Park; Attendance: 38,821; Referee: David Coote
Note: Lewis Dobbin made his professional debut for Everton as a substitute for Alex Iwobi.

2 October 2021 7	Manchester United	1–1	Everton	Old Trafford
12:30 BST	Greenwood (yellow card) 34'; Martial 43'	Report	Townsend 65'; Doucouré (yellow card) 76'	Stadium: Old Trafford; Attendance: 73,128; Referee: Michael Oliver

17 October 2021 8	Everton	0–1	West Ham United	Walton, Liverpool
14:00 BST		Report	Antonio (yellow card) 10'; Fornals (yellow card) 31'; Ogbonna 74'	Stadium: Goodison Park; Attendance: 39,132; Referee: Stuart Attwell

23 October 2021 9	Everton	2–5	Watford	Walton, Liverpool
15:00 BST	Davies 3'; Digne (yellow card) 17'; Allan (yellow card) 54'; Richarlison 63', (yellow card) 72'; Rondón (yellow card) 90+3'	Report	King 13', 80', 86', (yellow card) 81'; Troost-Ekong (yellow card) 44'; Kucka 78'; Dennis (yellow card) 70', (goal) 90+1'	Stadium: Goodison Park; Attendance: 38,834; Referee: Graham Scott

1 November 2021 10	Wolverhampton Wanderers	2–1	Everton	Wolverhampton
20:00 GMT	Kilman 28'; Jiménez 32'; Aït-Nouri (yellow card) 90+2'	Report	Iwobi 66'; Coleman (yellow card) 90+2'	Stadium: Molineux; Attendance: 30,617; Referee: Martin Atkinson

7 November 2021 11	Everton	0–0	Tottenham Hotspur	Walton, Liverpool
14:00 GMT	Delph (yellow card) 26'; Richarlison (yellow card) 69'; Holgate (red card) 90+2'	Report	Reguilón (yellow card) 12'; Romero (yellow card) 69'; Ndombele (yellow card) 87'; Skipp (yellow card) 90+4'	Stadium: Goodison Park; Attendance: 39,059; Referee: Chris Kavanagh

21 November 2021 12	Manchester City	3–0	Everton	Manchester
14:00 GMT	Sterling 44'; Laporte (yellow card) 45+3'; Rodri 55'; Silva 86'	Report	Richarlison (yellow card) 31'	Stadium: Etihad Stadium; Attendance: 52,571; Referee: Stuart Attwell

28 November 2021 13	Brentford	1–0	Everton	Brentford
14:00 GMT	Toney 24' (pen.); Onyeka (yellow card) 43'; Canós (yellow card) 51'; Jansson (yellow card) 66'; Mbeumo (yellow card) 90+2'	Report	Townsend (yellow card) 38'; Rondón (yellow card) 66'; Godfrey (yellow card) 80'	Stadium: Brentford Community Stadium; Attendance: 16,957; Referee: Darren England

1 December 2021 14	Everton	1–4	Liverpool	Walton, Liverpool
20:15 GMT	Townsend (yellow card) 16'; Allan (yellow card) 31'; Gray 38', (yellow card) 44'; Digne (yellow card) 40'	Report	Henderson 9'; Salah 19', 64'; Thiago (yellow card) 39'; Robertson (yellow card) 63'; Jota 79'; Van Dijk (yellow card) 80'	Stadium: Goodison Park; Attendance: 39,641; Referee: Paul Tierney

6 December 2021 15	Everton	2–1	Arsenal	Walton, Liverpool
20:00 GMT	Godfrey (yellow card) 51'; Richarlison 79'; Gray 90+2', (yellow card) 90+3'	Report	Ødegaard 45+2', (yellow card) 75'; Xhaka (yellow card) 63'	Stadium: Goodison Park; Attendance: 38,906; Referee: Mike Dean

12 December 2021 16	Crystal Palace	3–1	Everton	Selhurst
16:30 GMT	Gallagher 41', 90+3'; Tomkins 62'	Report	Rondón 70'; Doucouré (yellow card) 72'; Gray (yellow card) 76'	Stadium: Selhurst Park; Attendance: 24,066; Referee: Andy Madley

16 December 2021 17	Chelsea	1–1	Everton	Fulham
19:45 GMT	Loftus-Cheek (yellow card) 45'; Jorginho (yellow card) 59'; Mount 70'	Report	Holgate (yellow card) 21'; Gomes (yellow card) 64'; Branthwaite 74'; Dobbin (yellow card) 77'	Stadium: Stamford Bridge; Attendance: 39,933; Referee: Michael Oliver

2 January 2022 21	Everton	2–3	Brighton & Hove Albion	Walton, Liverpool
14:00 GMT	Kenny (yellow card) 9'; Calvert-Lewin (penalty missed) 25'; Gordon 53', 76'	Report	Mac Allister 3', 71'; Burn 21'; Webster (yellow card) 63'	Stadium: Goodison Park; Attendance: 38,203; Referee: John Brooks

15 January 2022 22	Norwich City	2–1	Everton	Norwich
15:00 GMT	Keane 16' (o.g.); Idah 18'; Sargent (yellow card) 50'; Aarons (yellow card) 66'; Pukki (yellow card) 70'	Report	Keane (yellow card) 47'; Richarlison 60'	Stadium: Carrow Road; Attendance: 26,629; Referee: Andrew Madley

22 January 2022 23	Everton	0–1	Aston Villa	Walton, Liverpool
12:30 GMT	Gomes (yellow card) 45+1'; Calvert-Lewin (yellow card) 50'; Mina (yellow card) 58'; Allan (yellow card) 82'; Godfrey (yellow card) 83'	Report	Buendía 45+3'; Martínez (yellow card) 68'; Cash (yellow card) 75'; Mings (yellow card) 86'; Ings (yellow card) 90+3'	Stadium: Goodison Park; Attendance: 38,203; Referee: Craig Pawson

8 February 2022 24	Newcastle United	3–1	Everton	Newcastle upon Tyne
19:45 GMT	Shelvey (yellow card) 33'; Holgate 37' (o.g.); Schär (yellow card) 50'; Fraser 56'; Trippier 80'	Report	Holgate (yellow card) 14'; Lascelles 36' (o.g.); Gomes (yellow card) 47'; Allan (yellow card) 79'	Stadium: St James' Park; Attendance: 52,186; Referee: Anthony Taylor

12 February 2022 25	Everton	3–0	Leeds United	Walton, Liverpool
15:00 GMT	Coleman 10'; Keane 23'; Iwobi (yellow card) 74'; Gordon 78'	Report	James (yellow card) 29'	Stadium: Goodison Park; Attendance: 39,150; Referee: Graham Scott

19 February 2022 26	Southampton	2–0	Everton	Southampton
15:00 GMT	Armstrong 52'; Long 84'	Report	Allan (yellow card) 15'; Calvert-Lewin (yellow card) 40'	Stadium: St Mary's Stadium; Attendance: 31,312; Referee: Andrew Madley

26 February 2022 27	Everton	0–1	Manchester City	Walton, Liverpool
17:30 GMT	Van de Beek (yellow card) 27'; Allan (yellow card) 57'; Alli (yellow card) 90+6'	Report	Foden 82', (yellow card) 89'; Ederson (yellow card) 87'	Stadium: Goodison Park; Attendance: 39,105; Referee: Paul Tierney

7 March 2022 28	Tottenham Hotspur	5–0	Everton	Tottenham
20:00 GMT	Keane 14' (o.g.); Son 17', (yellow card) 24'; Romero (yellow card) 30'; Kane 37', 56'; Reguilón 46'	Report		Stadium: Tottenham Hotspur Stadium; Attendance: 59,647; Referee: Stuart Attwell

13 March 2022 29	Everton	0–1	Wolverhampton Wanderers	Walton, Liverpool
14:00 GMT	Holgate (yellow card) 69'; Kenny (yellow card) 75' (yellow-red card) 78'; Godfrey (yellow card) 84'	Report	Coady 49', (yellow card) 64'	Stadium: Goodison Park; Attendance: 39,112; Referee: Michael Oliver

17 March 2022 20	Everton	1–0	Newcastle United	Walton, Liverpool
19:45 GMT	Richarlison (yellow card) 64'; Gordon (yellow card) 76'; Allan (red card) 83'; Iwobi 90+9'	Report	Krafth (yellow card) 76'	Stadium: Goodison Park; Attendance: 39,068; Referee: Craig Pawson
Note: The match was originally scheduled for 30 December 2021, but was postponed due to a COVID-19 outbreak and injury problems at Newcastle United.

3 April 2022 30	West Ham United	2–1	Everton	Stratford
14:00 BST	Cresswell 32', (yellow card) 90+4'; Bowen 58'	Report	Keane (yellow card) 34' (yellow-red card) 65'; Holgate 53', (yellow card) 84'	Stadium: London Stadium; Attendance: 59,953; Referee: Michael Oliver

6 April 2022 19	Burnley	3–2	Everton	Burnley
19:30 BST	Brownhill (yellow card) 10'; Collins 12'; Rodriguez 57'; Lowton (yellow card) 76'; Cornet 86'	Report	Holgate (yellow card) 3'; Richarlison 18' (pen.), 41' (pen.); Godfrey (yellow card) 54'	Stadium: Turf Moor; Attendance: 19,830; Referee: Mike Dean
Note: The match was originally scheduled for 26 December 2021 but was postponed due to a COVID-19 outbreak in Everton's squad and rescheduled to 6 April 2022.

9 April 2022 31	Everton	1–0	Manchester United	Walton, Liverpool
12:30 BST	Gordon 27', (yellow card) 75'; Pickford (yellow card) 86'	Report	Pogba (yellow card) 51'; Ronaldo (yellow card) 87'	Stadium: Goodison Park; Attendance: 39,080; Referee: Jonathan Moss

20 April 2022 18	Everton	1–1	Leicester City	Walton, Liverpool
19:45 BST	Richarlison (yellow card) 75', (goal) 90+2'; Mina (yellow card) 80'; Alli (yellow card) 86'; Rondón (yellow card) 90+3'	Report	Barnes 5'; Schmeichel (yellow card) 90+3'; Daka (yellow card) 90+4'	Stadium: Goodison Park; Attendance: 39,153; Referee: David Coote
Note: The match was originally scheduled for 19 December 2021 but was postponed due to a COVID-19 outbreak in Leicester's squad and rescheduled to 20 April 2022.

24 April 2022 32	Liverpool	2–0	Everton	Anfield, Liverpool
16:30 BST	Mané (yellow card) 45+2'; Alexander-Arnold (yellow card) 58'; Robertson 62'; Origi 85'	Report	Gordon (yellow card) 25'; Doucouré (yellow card) 45'; Allan (yellow card) 66'; Alli (yellow card) 89'; Richarlison (yellow card) 90+1'	Stadium: Anfield; Attendance: 52,852; Referee: Stuart Attwell

1 May 2022 33	Everton	1–0	Chelsea	Walton, Liverpool
14:00 BST	Coleman (yellow card) 38'; Delph (yellow card) 45+2'; Richarlison 47'; Holgate (yellow card) 90+6'	Report	Rüdiger (yellow card) 17'; Mount (yellow card) 36'; Azpilicueta (yellow card) 38'; Alonso (yellow card) 76'; Havertz (yellow card) 83'	Stadium: Goodison Park; Attendance: 39,256; Referee: Kevin Friend

8 May 2022 34	Leicester City	1–2	Everton	Leicester
14:00 BST	Daka 11'; Mendy (yellow card) 47'; Amartey (yellow card) 88'; Fofana (yellow card) 90+3'	Report	Mykolenko 6'; Holgate 30'	Stadium: King Power Stadium; Attendance: 32,001; Referee: Craig Pawson

11 May 2022 35	Watford	0–0	Everton	Watford
19:45 BST	Samir (yellow card) 61'	Report	Holgate (yellow card) 18'; Coleman (yellow card) 65'	Stadium: Vicarage Road; Attendance: 20,653; Referee: Mike Dean

15 May 2022 36	Everton	2–3	Brentford	Walton, Liverpool
16:30 BST	Calvert-Lewin 10'; Branthwaite (red card) 18'; Richarlison 45+2' (pen.); Rondón (red card) 88'	Report	Sørensen (yellow card) 10'; Jensen (yellow card) 27'; Coleman 37' (o.g.); Ajer (yellow card) 40'; Wissa 62'; Henry 64'	Stadium: Goodison Park; Attendance: 38,819; Referee: Michael Oliver

19 May 2022 37	Everton	3–2	Crystal Palace	Walton, Liverpool
19:45 BST	Keane 54', (yellow card) 68'; Richarlison 75'; Doucouré (yellow card) 82'; Calvert-Lewin 85'	Report	Mateta 21'; Hughes (yellow card) 32'; Ayew (yellow card) 34', (goal) 36'; Zaha (yellow card) 69'	Stadium: Goodison Park; Attendance: 38,448; Referee: Anthony Taylor

22 May 2022 38	Arsenal	5–1	Everton	Holloway
16:00 BST	Martinelli 27' (pen.); Nketiah 31'; Cédric 56'; Gabriel 59'; Ødegaard 82'	Report	Van de Beek 45+3'; Davies (yellow card) 69'	Stadium: Emirates Stadium; Attendance: 60,201; Referee: Andre Marriner

=== FA Cup ===
Everton were drawn away to Hull City in the third round.

8 January 2022 Third round	Hull City	2–3 (a.e.t.)	Everton	Kingston upon Hull
17:30 GMT	Smith 1'; Longman 71'; Huddlestone (yellow card) 90+5'	Report	Gray 21'; Gomes 31'; Mykolenko (yellow card) 45+1'; Townsend 99'; Godfrey (yellow card) 114'	Stadium: KCOM Stadium; Attendance: 16,282; Referee: Andrew Madley

5 February 2022 Fourth round	Everton	4–1	Brentford	Walton
15:00 GMT	Gomes (yellow card) 24'; Mina 31'; Richarlison 48'; Holgate 62'; Gordon (yellow card) 67'; Townsend 90+1'	Report	Roerslev (yellow card) 42'; Toney 54' (pen.)	Stadium: Goodison Park; Attendance: 39,571; Referee: Michael Oliver

3 March 2022 Fifth round	Everton	2–0	Boreham Wood	Walton
20:15 GMT	Rondón 57', 84'	Report	Evans (yellow card) 59'	Stadium: Goodison Park; Attendance: 38,836; Referee: Tony Harrington

20 March 2022 Quarter-finals	Crystal Palace	4–0	Everton	Selhurst
12:30 GMT	Guéhi 25'; Mateta 41'; Zaha 79'; Hughes 88'	Report	Gordon (yellow card) 62'; Gomes (yellow card) 64'	Stadium: Selhurst Park; Attendance: 25,400; Referee: Stuart Attwell

=== EFL Cup ===
Everton entered the competition in the second round and were drawn away to Huddersfield Town and Queens Park Rangers in the third round.

24 August 2021 Second round	Huddersfield Town	1–2	Everton	Huddersfield
19:45 BST	Lees 45'; Thomas (yellow card) 60'; Sarr (yellow card) 81'	Report	Iwobi 26'; Kean (red card) 59'; Townsend 79'; Gomes (yellow card) 90+4'	Stadium: John Smith's Stadium; Attendance: 10,459; Referee: Matt Donohue

21 September 2021 Third round	Queens Park Rangers	2–2 (8–7 p)	Everton	Shepherd's Bush
19:45 BST	Austin 18', 34'; McCallum (yellow card) 49'; Dickie (yellow card) 88'	Report	Digne 30'; Townsend 47'	Stadium: Kiyan Prince Foundation Stadium; Attendance: 12,888; Referee: Kevin Friend
	Penalties
	Austin (penalty scored); Ball (penalty scored); Barbet (penalty scored); Willock (penalty scored); Adomah (penalty scored); Duke-McKenna (penalty scored); Amos (penalty scored); Dunne (penalty scored)		(penalty scored) Holgate; (penalty scored) Keane; (penalty scored) Townsend; (penalty scored) Gray; (penalty scored) Gordon; (penalty scored) Doucouré; (penalty scored) Godfrey; (penalty missed) Davies

== Statistics ==
=== Appearances and goals ===
No.	Pos	Nat	Player	Total		Premier League		FA Cup		EFL Cup	
No.	Pos	Nat	Player	Apps	Goals	Apps	Goals	Apps	Goals	Apps	Goals
Goalkeepers
1	GK	(England) ENG	Jordan Pickford	37	0	35	0	2	0	0	0
15	GK	(Bosnia and Herzegovina) BIH	Asmir Begović	7	0	3	0	2	0	2	0
31	GK	(England) ENG	Andy Lonergan	0	0	0	0	0	0	0	0
Defenders
2	DF	(England) ENG	Jonjoe Kenny	21	0	11+4	0	3+1	0	2	0
3	DF	(Scotland) SCO	Nathan Patterson	1	0	0	0	1	0	0	0
4	DF	(England) ENG	Mason Holgate	29	3	23+2	2	2	1	2	0
5	DF	(England) ENG	Michael Keane	38	3	31+1	3	4	0	1+1	0
13	DF	(Colombia) COL	Yerry Mina	14	1	11+2	0	0+1	1	0	0
19	DF	(Ukraine) UKR	Vitaliy Mykolenko	16	1	12+1	1	3	0	0	0
22	DF	(England) ENG	Ben Godfrey	27	0	23	0	3	0	1	0
23	DF	(Republic of Ireland) IRL	Séamus Coleman	34	1	30	1	3+1	0	0	0
32	DF	(England) ENG	Jarrad Branthwaite	8	1	4+2	1	1	0	1	0
64	DF	(England) ENG	Reece Welch	1	0	0	0	0+1	0	0	0
Midfielders
6	MF	(Brazil) BRA	Allan	31	0	25+3	0	3	0	0	0
8	MF	(England) ENG	Fabian Delph	11	0	8+3	0	0	0	0	0
10	MF	(Iceland) ISL	Gylfi Sigurðsson	0	0	0	0	0	0	0	0
16	MF	(Mali) MLI	Abdoulaye Doucouré	34	2	29+1	2	2+1	0	0+1	0
21	MF	(Portugal) POR	André Gomes	19	1	7+7	0	3	1	1+1	0
26	MF	(England) ENG	Tom Davies	8	1	2+4	1	0	0	2	0
30	MF	(Netherlands) NED	Donny van de Beek	7	1	5+2	1	0	0	0	0
60	MF	(England) ENG	Isaac Price	2	0	0+1	0	0+1	0	0	0
62	MF	(England) ENG	Tyler Onyango	3	0	0+3	0	0	0	0	0
Forwards
7	FW	(Brazil) BRA	Richarlison	33	11	28+2	10	2+1	1	0	0
9	FW	(England) ENG	Dominic Calvert-Lewin	18	5	15+2	5	0+1	0	0	0
11	FW	(England) ENG	Demarai Gray	39	6	28+6	5	2+1	1	0+2	0
14	FW	(England) ENG	Andros Townsend	27	7	17+4	3	2+2	2	2	2
17	FW	(Nigeria) NGR	Alex Iwobi	32	3	22+6	2	0+2	0	2	1
24	FW	(England) ENG	Anthony Gordon	40	4	25+10	4	4	0	1	0
28	FW	(Turkey) TUR	Cenk Tosun	3	0	0+1	0	0+2	0	0	0
33	FW	(Venezuela) VEN	Salomón Rondón	23	3	8+12	1	2	2	1	0
34	FW	(Netherlands) NED	Anwar El Ghazi	2	0	0+2	0	0	0	0	0
36	FW	(England) ENG	Dele Alli	11	0	1+10	0	0	0	0	0
61	FW	(England) ENG	Lewis Dobbin	5	0	0+3	0	0+2	0	0	0
Players transferred/loaned out during the season
12	DF	(France) FRA	Lucas Digne	15	1	13	0	0	0	1+1	1
18	DF	(France) FRA	Niels Nkounkou	1	0	0	0	0	0	1	0
19	FW	(Colombia) COL	James Rodríguez	0	0	0	0	0	0	0	0
25	MF	(Ivory Coast) CIV	Jean-Philippe Gbamin	5	0	1+2	0	0+1	0	1	0
27	FW	(Italy) ITA	Moise Kean	2	0	0+1	0	0	0	1	0
31	GK	(Portugal) POR	João Virgínia	0	0	0	0	0	0	0	0
34	FW	(Wales) WAL	Nathan Broadhead	0	0	0	0	0	0	0	0
50	FW	(England) ENG	Ellis Simms	1	0	1	0	0	0	0	0

Last updated: 22 May 2022
Source: Competitions

=== Goalscorers ===
As of match played 22 May 2022

Rank	Pos.	No.	Player	Premier League	FA Cup	EFL Cup	Total
1	FW	7	(Brazil) Richarlison	10	1	0	11
2	FW	14	(England) Andros Townsend	3	2	2	7
3	FW	11	(England) Demarai Gray	5	1	0	6
4	FW	9	(England) Dominic Calvert-Lewin	5	0	0	5
5	FW	24	(England) Anthony Gordon	4	0	0	4
6	DF	4	(England) Mason Holgate	2	1	0	3
6	DF	5	(England) Michael Keane	3	0	0	3
6	FW	17	(Nigeria) Alex Iwobi	2	0	1	3
6	FW	33	(Venezuela) Salomón Rondón	1	2	0	3
10	MF	16	(Mali) Abdoulaye Doucoure	2	0	0	2
11	DF	12	(France) Lucas Digne	0	0	1	1
11	DF	13	(Colombia) Yerry Mina	0	1	0	1
11	DF	19	(Ukraine) Vitaliy Mykolenko	1	0	0	1
11	DF	21	(Portugal) Andre Gomes	0	1	0	1
11	DF	23	(Republic of Ireland) Séamus Coleman	1	0	0	1
11	MF	26	(England) Tom Davies	1	0	0	1
11	MF	30	(Netherlands) Donny van de Beek	1	0	0	1
11	DF	32	(England) Jarrad Branthwaite	1	0	0	1
Own goals				1	0	0	1
Total				43	9	4	56

Source: Match reports in Competitions

=== Assists ===
As of match played 22 May 2022.

Rank	Pos.	No.	Player	Premier League	FA Cup	EFL Cup	Total
1	FW	7	(Brazil) Richarlison	5	0	0	5
1	FW	11	(England) Demarai Gray	4	1	0	5
3	FW	14	(England) Andros Townsend	2	1	1	4
3	MF	16	(Mali) Abdoulaye Doucoure	4	0	0	4
5	MF	2	(England) Jonjoe Kenny	1	2	0	3
5	MF	6	(Brazil) Allan	2	1	0	3
5	MF	17	(Nigeria) Alex Iwobi	2	1	0	3
5	FW	24	(England) Anthony Gordon	2	1	0	3
9	DF	5	(England) Michael Keane	2	0	0	2
9	FW	9	(England) Dominic Calvert-Lewin	2	0	0	2
9	MF	21	(Portugal) Andre Gomes	1	0	1	2
12	DF	4	(England) Mason Holgate	1	0	0	1
12	MF	25	(Ivory Coast) Jean-Philippe Gbamin	0	1	0	1
12	MF	26	(England) Tom Davies	0	0	1	1
12	FW	33	(Venezuela) Salomón Rondón	1	0	0	1
Total				29	8	3	40

Source: Match reports in Competitions

=== Clean sheets ===
As of match played 22 May 2022.

Rank	Name	Premier League	FA Cup	EFL Cup	Total	Played Games
1	(England) Jordan Pickford	7	0	0	7	37
2	(Bosnia and Herzegovina) Asmir Begović	1	1	0	2	7
Total		8	1	0	9	44

Source: Match reports in Competitions

=== Disciplinary record ===
As of match played 3 March 2022.

Rank	Position	Name	Premier League		FA Cup		EFL Cup		Total	
Rank	Position	Name	Yellow card	Red card	Yellow card	Red card	Yellow card	Red card	Yellow card	Red card
1	MF	(Brazil) Allan	6	0	0	0	0	0	6	0
2	FW	(Brazil) Richarlison	5	0	0	0	0	0	5	0
2	DF	(England) Ben Godfrey	4	0	1	0	0	0	5	0
4	DF	(France) Lucas Digne	4	0	0	0	0	0	4	0
4	MF	(Mali) Abdoulaye Doucouré	4	0	0	0	0	0	4	0
4	MF	(Portugal) Andre Gomes	2	0	1	0	1	0	4	0
7	FW	(England) Andros Townsend	3	0	0	0	0	0	3	0
7	FW	(England) Demarai Gray	3	0	0	0	0	0	3	0
9	DF	(Republic of Ireland) Séamus Coleman	2	0	0	0	0	0	2	0
9	FW	(Venezuela) Salomón Rondón	2	0	0	0	0	0	2	0
9	DF	(Colombia) Yerry Mina	2	0	0	0	0	0	2	0
9	FW	(England) Dominic Calvert-Lewin	2	0	0	0	0	0	2	0
9	FW	(England) Anthony Gordon	1	0	1	0	0	0	2	0
9	DF	(England) Mason Holgate	1	1	0	0	0	0	1	1
15	GK	(England) Jordan Pickford	1	0	0	0	0	0	1	0
15	MF	(England) Fabian Delph	1	0	0	0	0	0	1	0
15	DF	(England) Jonjoe Kenny	1	0	0	0	0	0	1	0
15	DF	(England) Michael Keane	1	0	0	0	0	0	1	0
15	FW	(Nigeria) Alex Iwobi	1	0	0	0	0	0	1	0
15	FW	(England) Dele Alli	1	0	0	0	0	0	1	0
15	MF	(Netherlands) Donny van de Beek	1	0	0	0	0	0	1	0
15	DF	(Ukraine) Vitaliy Mykolenko	0	0	1	0	0	0	1	0
15	FW	(Italy) Moise Kean	0	0	0	0	0	1	0	1
15	Total		48	1	2	0	1	1	51	2

Source: Match reports in Competitions

== See also ==
- 2021–22 in English football
- List of Everton F.C. seasons
