= Beckham Castro =

Colombian footballer (born 2003)

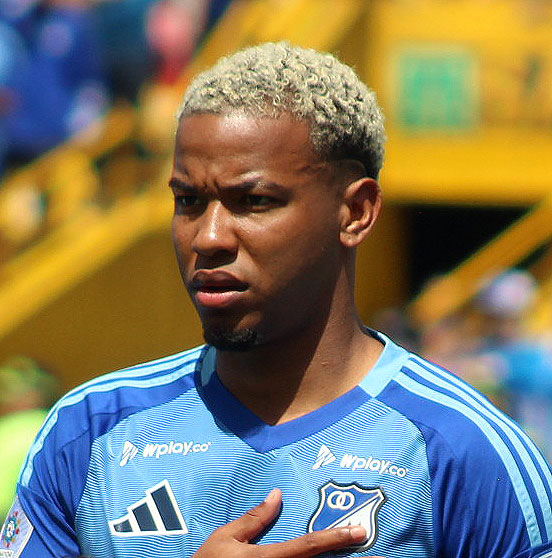

Personal information
- Full name: Beckham David Castro Espinosa
- Date of birth: 12 September 2003 (age 23)
- Place of birth: Cartagena, Bolívar, Colombia
- Height: 1.76 m (5 ft 9 in)
- Position: Winger

Team information
- Current team: Lugano
- Number: 22

Youth career
- Chiqui Orozco
- Academia de Crespo
- Estudiantil
- Aston Villa de Cali
- 2020–2023: Millonarios

Senior career*
Years	Team	Apps	(Gls)
2023–2026	Millonarios	64	(15)
2024–2025	→ La Equidad (loan)	26	(3)
2026–	Lugano	5	(2)
- * Club domestic league appearances and goals as of 28 September 2026

Beckham David Castro Espinosa (born 12 September 2003) is a Colombian footballer who plays as a winger for Swiss Super League club Lugano.

== Early life ==
Castro was born in Cartagena, and is named after former Manchester United, Real Madrid and England international footballer David Beckham, as his father was a fan of Real Madrid. Due to his relatively unusual name, his footballing career was the subject of media attention from a young age, and in 2013 Colombian newspaper Q'hubo ran an article on him, despite him only being ten years old at the time.

== Club career ==
=== Early career ===
Castro began his footballing career at Chiqui Orozco, a local footballing school in Cartagena. He later played for Academia de Crespo and Estudiantil de Medellín, also representing Aston Villa de Cali.

=== Millonarios ===
Having trialled with Brazilian and Portuguese clubs Grêmio and Braga, respectively, Castro signed a professional contract with Categoría Primera A side Millonarios in his native Colombia in December 2020. He finished bronze in the 2022 golden boot race at youth level, and the following year he made his debut on 22 March 2023, coming on as a late substitute for Fernando Uribe in a 2–0 league win over Deportivo Pasto.

Following teammate Óscar Cortés' call up to the Colombia under-20 side for the 2023 FIFA U-20 World Cup, and an injury to attacking midfielder Daniel Cataño, Castro was given a run of games as a starter in the Millonarios side. Having been named in the line-up for Millonarios' Categoría Primera A fixture against Independiente Medellín on 20 May 2023, he latched on to a cross from Leonardo Castro late into the first half to score his first goal for the club in the eventual 2–2 draw. Three days later he made his Copa Sudamericana bow, starting in a 3–1 win over Uruguayan opposition Peñarol, and getting the assist for Jorge Arias' goal. He followed this up with an assist in the following game, a 1–0 win against Boyacá Chicó, before scoring his second goal for the club - the only goal in a 1–0 win against América de Cali on 31 May 2023.

On 3 August 2023, following a short absence from the first team, he returned to action in Millonarios' friendly win over Spanish opposition Real Zaragoza, scoring the first goal in an eventual 2–1 win.

=== Lugano ===
On 22 May 2026, Castro joined Lugano in Switzerland for three seasons.

== Career statistics ==
=== Club ===
As of 6 August 2023.

Appearances and goals by club, season and competition
Club	Season	League			Cup		Continental		Other		Total	
Club	Season	Division	Apps	Goals	Apps	Goals	Apps	Goals	Apps	Goals	Apps	Goals
Millonarios	2023	Categoría Primera A	14	2	0	0	3 (Note: Appearances in the Copa Sudamericana)	0	0	0	17	2
Career total			14	2	0	0	3	0	0	0	17	2

== Honours ==
Millonarios

- Categoría Primera A: 2023-I
- Superliga Colombiana: 2024
