= Álvaro Montero (Colombian footballer) =

Colombian footballer (born 1995)

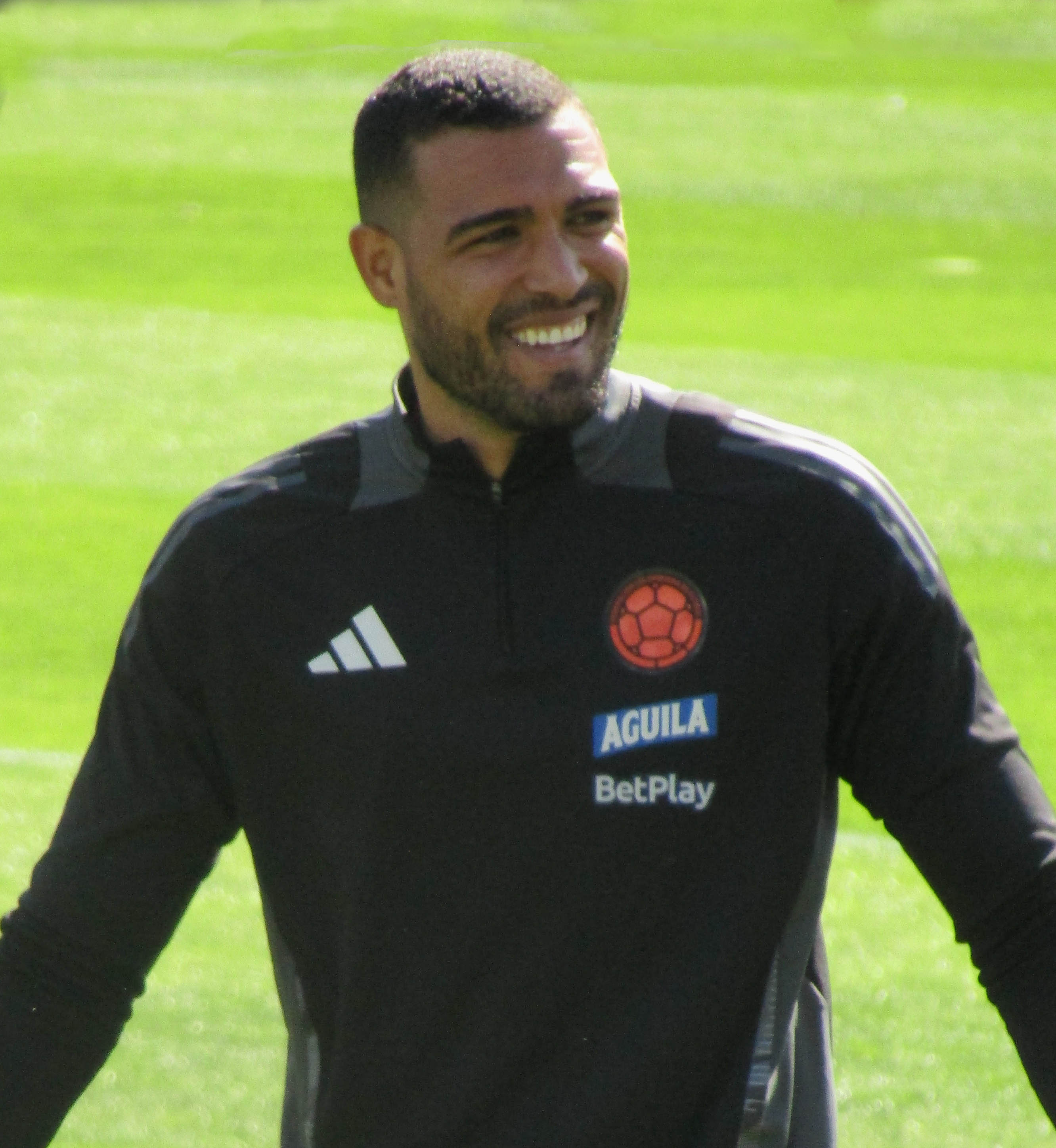
- Montero with Colombia in 2024

Personal information
- Full name: Álvaro David Montero Perales
- Date of birth: 29 March 1995 (age 31)
- Place of birth: El Molino, La Guajira, Colombia
- Height: 2.00 m (6 ft 7 in)
- Position: Goalkeeper

Team information
- Current team: Boca Juniors
- Number: 1

Youth career
- –2013: São Caetano

Senior career*
Years	Team	Apps	(Gls)
2013–2015	São Caetano	0	(0)
2015–2017	San Lorenzo	0	(0)
2017	Cúcuta Deportivo	0	(0)
2018–2022	Deportes Tolima	147	(0)
2022–	Millonarios	149	(0)
2025–2026	→ Vélez Sarsfield (loan)	20	(0)
2026–	Boca Juniors	8	(0)

International career^{‡}
2014–2015	Colombia U20	14	(0)
2015	Colombia Olympic	2	(0)
2019–	Colombia	12	(0)
Medal record
Men's football
Representing Colombia
Copa América
Runner-up	2024 United States
- * Club domestic league appearances and goals as of 10:54, 18 September 2026 (UTC) ‡ National team caps and goals as of 26 September 2026

Álvaro David Montero Perales (born 29 March 1995) is a Colombian professional footballer who plays as a goalkeeper for Argentine Primera División club Boca Juniors and the Colombia national team.

Montero began his professional career with Brazilian club São Caetano and later joined Argentine side San Lorenzo, although he did not make a senior league appearance for either club. After a spell with Cúcuta Deportivo, he established himself at Deportes Tolima, where he won two league titles. In 2022, he joined Millonarios, winning the 2022 Copa Colombia, the 2023 Apertura, and the 2024 Superliga Colombiana, before moving on loan to Vélez Sarsfield in 2025.

A Colombia youth international, Montero represented his country at the 2015 South American Youth Football Championship and the 2015 FIFA U-20 World Cup before making his senior debut in 2019. He was part of Colombia's squads for the 2019 Copa América, the 2024 Copa América, where the team finished as runners-up, and the 2026 FIFA World Cup.

== Club career ==
=== Early career ===
==== São Caetano and San Lorenzo ====
Montero began his career in Brazil, joining São Caetano in 2013 as part of his early professional development. Although he made appearances for the club, his time there primarily served as the foundation for his path into senior football abroad.

In July 2015, following his participation with Colombia at the 2015 FIFA U-20 World Cup, Montero signed for Argentine club San Lorenzo on a four-year contract, arriving as one of the standout young goalkeepers from the youth tournament.

Despite his contract, Montero did not make a senior league appearance for the club. In an interview conducted during his time at San Lorenzo, he spoke of the experience of adapting to Argentine football, citing Mario Yepes as a reference for how Colombian players could succeed abroad. His lack of first-team minutes at the club meant his stay in Buenos Aires ended without a competitive debut, something later Colombian coverage consistently noted when reflecting on his early career.

=== Cúcuta ===
After leaving San Lorenzo, Montero returned to Colombian football and joined Cúcuta Deportivo in 2017. His time at the club was brief, but it marked his return to the Colombian domestic game and set the stage for the breakthrough period of his career.

=== Deportes Tolima ===
In January 2018, Montero joined Deportes Tolima, with Millonarios' official signing announcement later noting his debut for the club came on 24 March 2018 against Independiente Medellín. He was quickly established as the club's first-choice goalkeeper, and in his first season made an immediate impact. Tolima reached the final of the Liga Águila I-2018, where they faced Atlético Nacional. After two legs, the tie was level and went to a penalty shootout in which Montero saved kicks from Reinaldo Lenis and Vladimir Hernández, helping Tolima win 4–2 on penalties to claim the title.

Montero continued as first-choice goalkeeper for Tolima throughout the 2019 and 2020 seasons. The club reached the final of the 2019 Superliga Colombiana during this period, finishing as runners-up, while also competing in the Copa Colombia and continental competitions. Over his four seasons with the club, he made 152 appearances across all competitions, including the Copa Libertadores and Copa Sudamericana.

In the Liga BetPlay I-2021, Tolima again reached the final, this time facing Millonarios. After drawing 1–1 in the first leg in Ibagué, Tolima travelled to the Estadio El Campín for the second leg, where goals from Juan Fernando Caicedo at the 61st and 69th minute gave them a 2–1 victory on the night and a 3–2 aggregate win. The victory made Tolima the first club to defeat Millonarios in the final of a short-format tournament. After the title win, Montero's contract with the club expired and was not renewed. In an interview with Caracol Radio years later, Montero clarified that his departure was not due to any internal conflict: "It's a mistaken perception that I left on bad terms. My contract ended and we couldn't renew due to specific differences. I think the fans love me, I tried to give everything and be as professional as possible."

=== Millonarios ===
Montero joined Millonarios in 2022. In its official announcement, the club highlighted his two Colombian league titles with Deportes Tolima and described him as a goalkeeper with senior international experience, signing a three-year contract. He was also noted as a direct replacement for Wuilker Faríñez, whose departure had left uncertainty in goal for the Bogotá club. In his first season, Montero helped Millonarios win the 2022 Copa Colombia. In the final, the club overturned a 1–0 first-leg deficit against Atlético Junior, winning the second leg 2–0 at El Campín to claim the title 2–1 on aggregate.

The 2023 Liga BetPlay I-2023 campaign produced what Colombian football coverage widely described as one of the most anticipated finals in the history of the competition, as Millonarios faced Atlético Nacional. After two legs ended level at 1–1 on aggregate, the title was decided by a penalty shootout at El Campín. Montero was the decisive figure for Millonarios, saving penalties from Jarlan Barrera and Cristián Zapata, while Dorlan Pabón also missed, to hand Millonarios a 3–2 shootout victory. The result gave Millonarios their 16th Colombian league title, and as a result, Montero was praised in Colombian media as the central figure in the club's success during the penalty shootout. By September 2023, Montero reached 100 appearances for the club.

In January 2024, Montero played a key role in Millonarios' 2024 Superliga Colombiana campaign. In the final second leg against Atlético Junior, he produced a decisive save in the 72nd minute, denying a one-on-one chance from Yimmi Chará that would have levelled the tie. Millonarios won the match 2–0 and lifted the Superliga. Montero was visibly emotional during the post-match celebrations, with the goalkeeper saying: "It was the last one I was missing here in Colombia; it had been a little elusive, but you have to thank the boys for getting to celebrate this." During this period, reports linking Montero with a move abroad began to emerge in the Colombian press, including reported interest from Universidad Católica de Chile.

Montero remained at Millonarios into the first half of 2025 before his loan to Vélez Sarsfield was confirmed. Colombian and Argentine outlets reported that the move came after Montero expressed his desire to continue his career outside Colombia, with his representative telling Caracol Radio: "The priority for him is to keep playing abroad, that's what he wants."

==== Vélez Sarsfield (loan) ====
Montero joined Vélez Sarsfield on loan from Millonarios in July 2025, with Vélez announcing him as a reinforcement for the second half of the year. The move represented his return to Argentine football after a decade, having previously been at San Lorenzo without making a senior debut. However, his first months at the club were difficult. He found himself behind Tomás Marchiori in the pecking order and spent the majority of the Clausura, Copa Libertadores, and Copa Argentina campaigns on the bench. His official debut for Vélez came on 12 September 2025, when a first-half injury to Marchiori brought Montero on at the Estadio Tomás Adolfo Ducó in a goalless draw against Huracán. Despite the difficult circumstances of his introduction, he made a key save during his 60 minutes on the pitch. Despite limited playing time, Montero was part of the Vélez squad that won the Supercopa Argentina in 2025. He publicly reflected on the emotional difficulty of leaving Millonarios, telling AS Colombia: "I also feel that heartache for leaving Millonarios."

Montero began 2026 as first-choice goalkeeper for Vélez, with coach Guillermo Barros Schelotto selecting him ahead of Marchiori for the start of the Apertura season. On 22 January 2026, Montero provided a standout performance in a 1–0 victory over Instituto in Córdoba, recording multiple saves, including a reaction stop from a corner, a block from distance, a double save, and a further intervention in the second half to preserve the clean sheet. In February 2026 that Montero had been a starter in Vélez's first six league matches of the year, conceding just four goals and keeping two clean sheets, with the club remaining unbeaten at the top of the table. In the first half of 2026, Montero made 17 league appearances for Vélez Sarsfield, playing 1,530 minutes and keeping seven clean sheets. He conceded 13 goals across those matches and was later included in Colombia's squad for the 2026 FIFA World Cup.

=== Boca Juniors ===
In July 2026, Montero joined Boca Juniors. The transfer was completed through a three-club agreement in which Vélez Sarsfield first exercised their US$1.35 million purchase option with Millonarios and then sold him to Boca for US$4 million. Millonarios also received a percentage of the resale. Boca confirmed the signing on 17 July, with Montero agreeing a contract until 2030. The club had been seeking a goalkeeper since first-choice Agustín Marchesín ruptured the anterior cruciate ligament in his right knee during a Copa Libertadores match against Barcelona S.C. in April, leaving Leandro Brey and the 39-year-old Javier García as the alternatives. At 2 metres, Montero became the tallest goalkeeper in Boca's history, and the third Colombian goalkeeper to represent the club, after Óscar Córdoba and Carlos Navarro Montoya.

Montero made his debut under head coach Rodolfo Arruabarrena on 23 July 2026, keeping a clean sheet in a 1–0 win over O'Higgins at La Bombonera in the first leg of the Copa Sudamericana knockout round play-offs. Three days later, he conceded three goals on his league debut, a 3–0 defeat to Deportivo Riestra on the opening matchday of the Torneo Clausura. In the return leg against O'Higgins in Chile on 30 July, which Boca lost 1–0, he saved Luis Alberto Pavez's penalty in the shoot-out as Boca advanced 4–3. Boca then eliminated Recoleta and São Paulo to reach the semi-finals. In the round of 16 of the 2026 Copa Argentina, Montero faced his former club Vélez Sarsfield at the Estadio Mario Alberto Kempes. After a goalless draw, he saved penalties from Elías Gómez and Thiago Silvero as Boca won the shoot-out 4–3.

== International career ==
=== Youth career ===
Montero represented Colombia at youth level and was part of the squad that finished runners-up at the 2015 South American Youth Football Championship. He was then selected for the 2015 FIFA U-20 World Cup in New Zealand, where he featured as Colombia's first-choice goalkeeper.

During his time with the under-20 national team, Montero established himself as one of the more prominent goalkeeping prospects of his generation in Colombian football.

=== Senior career ===
Montero made his senior debut for the Colombia national team on 3 June 2019 in a friendly against Panama, coming on as a 77th-minute substitute for David Ospina in a 3–0 victory.

Later that month, he was included in Colombia's squad for the 2019 Copa América in Brazil. With the team having already secured qualification to the knockout stage, Montero started the final group-stage match against Paraguay, keeping a clean sheet in a 1–0 win as Colombia advanced with a perfect record before being eliminated in the quarter-finals.

After several years on the fringes of the senior side, Montero re-emerged as a regular squad member during Néstor Lorenzo's tenure as Colombia manager.

In June 2023, Montero returned to action for the national team in a friendly against Iraq, keeping a clean sheet in a 1–0 victory. He later made appearances in 2026 FIFA World Cup qualification, including matches against Uruguay and Ecuador, as Lorenzo continued to rotate his goalkeepers.

Montero was named in Colombia's squad for the 2024 Copa América in the United States. Although he did not make an appearance during the tournament, he was one of the team's three goalkeepers as Colombia reached the final and finished as runners-up.

Montero remained in Colombia's plans during the 2026 World Cup cycle and was included in the country's 26-man squad for the 2026 FIFA World Cup.

== Career statistics ==
=== International ===
As of match played 26 September 2026

Appearances and goals by national team and year
National team	Year	Apps	Goals
Colombia	2019	3	0
Colombia	2020	0	0
Colombia	2021	0	0
Colombia	2022	0	0
Colombia	2023	5	0
Colombia	2024	0	0
Colombia	2025	2	0
Colombia	2026	2	0
Total		12	0

== Honours ==
San Lorenzo de Almagro

- Supercopa Argentina (1): 2015

Deportes Tolima

- Categoría Primera A (2): 2018–I, 2021–I

Millonarios

- Copa Colombia (1): 2022
- Categoría Primera A (1): 2023–I
- Superliga Colombiana (1): 2024

Boca Juniors

- Argentine Primera División: 2026 Liga
- Copa Sudamericana: 2026
