= Santiago Giordana =

Argentine footballer (born 1995)

Personal information
- Full name: Santiago Giordana
- Date of birth: 3 May 1995 (age 31)
- Place of birth: Córdoba, Argentina
- Height: 1.81 m (5 ft 11 1/2 in)
- Position: Forward

Team information
- Current team: Millonarios FC
- Number: 32

Youth career
- 2012–2015: Belgrano

Senior career*
Years	Team	Apps	(Gls)
2015–2018	Belgrano	1	(0)
2016–2017	→ Guillermo Brown (loan)	39	(7)
2017–2018	→ Villa Dálmine (loan)	13	(0)
2018–2019	Temperley	25	(2)
2019–2020	Alvarado	17	(5)
2020–2021	Chacarita Juniors	8	(1)
2021–2022	Mushuc Runa	52	(19)
2023	Deportivo Garcilaso	32	(22)
2024–	Millonarios	68	(8)
- * Club domestic league appearances and goals as of 12 December 2025

Santiago Giordana (born 3 May 1995) is an Argentine professional footballer who plays as a forward for Millonarios FC.

== Career ==
Giordana's senior career started with Belgrano in 2015, three years after joining the club's youth system. He signed his first professional contract on 5 March, prior to being an unused substitute for an Argentine Primera División match with Olimpo on 31 August. Days later, versus Temperley, Giordana made his debut in a 2–1 defeat. In June 2016, Giordana joined Primera B Nacional side Guillermo Brown on loan for a year. He went onto score eight goals in forty matches, including his first vs. Los Andes on 21 September in a 2–0 victory.

On 28 August 2017, Giordana completed a loan move to Villa Dálmine of Primera B Nacional. His first appearance came three weeks later in a win over Boca Unidos. Twelve appearances later, Giordana returned to Belgrano and was subsequently signed by fellow Primera División team Temperley.

After spells at Alvarado (2019–20) and Chacarita Juniors (2020–21), Giordana joined Ecuadorian Serie A side Mushuc Runa in June 2021.

== Career statistics ==
As of 26 May 2018.

Club statistics
Club	Season	League			Cup (Note: Includes the Copa Argentina)		League Cup		Continental (Note: Includes the Copa Sudamericana)		Other		Total	
Club	Season	Division	Apps	Goals	Apps	Goals	Apps	Goals	Apps	Goals	Apps	Goals	Apps	Goals
Belgrano	2015	Primera División	1	0	0	0	—		0	0	0	0	1	0
Belgrano	2016	Primera División	0	0	0	0	—		—		0	0	0	0
Belgrano	2016–17	Primera División	0	0	0	0	—		0	0	0	0	0	0
Belgrano	2017–18	Primera División	0	0	0	0	—		—		0	0	0	0
Belgrano	Total		1	0	0	0	—		0	0	0	0	1	0
Guillermo Brown (loan)	2016–17	Primera B Nacional	39	7	1	1	—		—		0	0	40	8
Villa Dálmine (loan)	2017–18	Primera B Nacional	13	0	0	0	—		—		0	0	13	0
Temperley	2017–18	Primera División	9	1	0	0	—		—		0	0	9	1
Career total			62	8	1	1	—		0	0	0	0	63	9

== Honours ==
Millonarios

- Superliga Colombiana: 2024
