= Stiven Vega =

Colombian footballer (born 1998)

Personal information
- Full name: Stiven Vega Londoño
- Date of birth: 22 May 1998 (age 28)
- Place of birth: Apartadó, Colombia
- Height: 1.78 m (5 ft 10 in)
- Position: Defender

Team information
- Current team: Millonarios
- Number: 28

Youth career
- Millonarios

Senior career*
Years	Team	Apps	(Gls)
2015–	Millonarios	229	(0)
2018	→Valledupar (loan)	3	(0)

International career^{‡}
2015	Colombia U17	9	(0)
2022–	Colombia	1	(0)
- * Club domestic league appearances and goals as of December 12, 2025 ‡ National team caps and goals as of January 19, 2022

Stiven Vega Londoño (born 22 May 1998) is a Colombian professional footballer who plays as a defender for Categoría Primera A club Millonarios.

== International career ==
Vega made his debut for the Colombia national team on 16 January 2022 in a 2–1 home win over Honduras.

== Honours ==
Millonarios

- Categoría Primera A: 2017–II, 2023–I
- Copa Colombia: 2022
- Superliga de Colombia: 2024
