= Danovis Banguero =

Colombian footballer (born 1989)

Personal information
- Full name: Danovis Banguero Lerma
- Date of birth: 27 October 1989 (age 37)
- Place of birth: Villavicencio, Colombia
- Height: 1.85 m (6 ft 1 in)
- Position: Defender

Team information
- Current team: Millonarios
- Number: 20

Senior career*
Years	Team	Apps	(Gls)
2008–2010	Cúcuta Deportivo	16	(1)
2011	→ Unión Magdalena (loan)	1	(0)
2011–2020	Deportes Tolima	272	(23)
2016	→ Atlético Huila (loan)	19	(1)
2021–2023	Atlético Nacional	102	(5)
2023	Águilas	19	(1)
2024–	Millonarios	68	(4)
- * Club domestic league appearances and goals as of 12 December 2025

Danovis Banguero Lerma (born 27 October 1989) is a Colombian footballer who plays for Millonarios.

== Honours ==
Deportes Tolima

- Copa Colombia: 2014
- Categoría Primera A: 2018-I

Atlético Nacional

- Copa Colombia: 2021
- Categoría Primera A: 2022-II
- Superliga Colombiana: 2023

Millonarios

- Superliga Colombiana: 2024
