= Diego Novoa =

Colombian footballer (born 1989)

Diego Alejandro Novoa Urrego (born 31 May 1989) is a Colombian professional footballer who plays as a goalkeeper for América de Cali in the Colombian Categoría Primera A.

== International career ==
Novoa was named in the provisional Colombia squad for the 2019 Copa America.

== Career statistics ==
=== Club ===
As of 18 July 2023

Club	Division	Season	League		Cup		Continental		Total	
Club	Division	Season	Apps	Goals	Apps	Goals	Apps	Goals	Apps	Goals
La Equidad	Categoría Primera B	2005	0	0	—		—		0	0
La Equidad	Categoría Primera B	2006	0	0	—		—		0	0
La Equidad	Categoría Primera A	2007	0	0	—		—		0	0
La Equidad	Categoría Primera A	2008	0	0	—		—		0	0
La Equidad	Categoría Primera A	2009	1	0	—		0	0	1	0
La Equidad	Categoría Primera A	2010	0	0	—		—		0	0
La Equidad	Categoría Primera A	2011	22	0	0	0	0	0	22	0
La Equidad	Categoría Primera A	2012	8	0	3	0	1	0	12	0
La Equidad	Categoría Primera A	2013	33	0	3	0	6	0	42	0
La Equidad	Categoría Primera A	2014	37	0	7	0	—		44	0
La Equidad	Categoría Primera A	2015	12	0	6	0	—		18	0
La Equidad	Categoría Primera A	2016	28	0	2	0	—		30	0
La Equidad	Categoría Primera A	2017	8	1	0	0	—		8	1
La Equidad	Categoría Primera A	2018	24	0	5	0	—		29	0
La Equidad	Categoría Primera A	2019	32	0	2	0	8	0	42	0
La Equidad	Categoría Primera A	2020	20	0	2	0	—		22	0
La Equidad	Total		225	1	30	0	15	0	270	1
América de Cali	Categoría Primera A	2021	15	0	5	0	0	0	20	0
América de Cali	Categoría Primera A	2022	20	0	0	0	0	0	20	0
América de Cali	Categoría Primera A	2023	27	0	1	0	—		28	0
América de Cali	Total		62	0	6	0	0	0	68	0
Career total			287	1	36	0	15	0	338	1

== Honours ==
La Equidad

- Categoría Primera B: 2006
- Copa Colombia: 2008

Millonarios

- Superliga de Colombia: 2024
