= Edgar Guerra =

Colombian footballer

Personal information
- Full name: Edgar Andrés Guerra Hernández
- Date of birth: 9 March 2001 (age 25)
- Place of birth: Becerril, Cesar, Colombia
- Height: 1.74 m (5 ft 8 1/2 in)
- Position: Winger

Team information
- Current team: León
- Number: 18

Youth career
- Millonarios

Senior career*
| Years | Team | Apps | (Gls) |
| 2020–2024 | Millonarios | 79 | (10) |
| 2024– | León | 35 | (1) |
| 2025–2026 | → Puebla (loan) | 23 | (4) |
- * Club domestic league appearances and goals as of 17:55, 21 February 2025 (UTC)

Edgar Andrés Guerra Hernández (born 9 March 2001) is a Colombian professional footballer who plays as a winger for Liga MX club León.

== Career ==
=== Millonarios ===
On 18 December 2019, Guerra signed his first professional contract with Millonarios. He made his debut on 9 December 2020 against Alianza Petrolera. On 30 December 2020, he signed a 3-year contract extension.

On 13 March 2021, he started for the first time in a 2–0 win against Patriotas Boyacá. He scored his first goal for the club in the same game.

On 21 January 2024, in the first game of the Torneo Apertura, he scored a hat-trick against Independiente Medellín, becoming the fifth-fastest for the club in league history. On 25 January 2024, he won the Superliga Colombiana, his third title with Millonarios.

=== Club León ===
On 1 February 2024, Liga MX club León confirmed the signing of Guerra.

== Career statistics ==
As of 13 April 2024

| Club | Season | League | | | Cup | | Continental | | Total | |
| Club | Season | Division | Apps | Goals | Apps | Goals | Apps | Goals | Apps | Goals |
|---|---|---|---|---|---|---|---|---|---|---|
| Millonarios | 2020 | Categoría Primera A | 2 | 0 | — | | — | | 2 | 0 |
| Millonarios | 2021 | Categoría Primera A | 20 | 2 | 2 | 0 | — | | 22 | 2 |
| Millonarios | 2022 | Categoría Primera A | 20 | 2 | 2 | 0 | 1 | 0 | 23 | 2 |
| Millonarios | 2023 | Categoría Primera A | 36 | 3 | 7 | 1 | 6 | 0 | 49 | 4 |
| Millonarios | 2024 | Categoría Primera A | 1 | 3 | 2 | 0 | 0 | 0 | 3 | 3 |
| Millonarios | Total | | 79 | 10 | 13 | 1 | 7 | 0 | 99 | 11 |
| Club León | 2023–24 | Liga MX | 11 | 1 | — | | — | | 11 | 1 |
| Club León | 2024–25 | Liga MX | 19 | 0 | — | | 2 (Note: Appearances in Leagues Cup) | 1 | 21 | 1 |
| Club León | Total | | 30 | 1 | 0 | 0 | 2 | 1 | 32 | 2 |
| Career total | | | 109 | 11 | 13 | 1 | 9 | 1 | 131 | 13 |

== Honours ==
Millonarios

- Copa Colombia: 2022
- Torneo Apertura: 2023
- Superliga Colombiana: 2024
