= Jorge Arias (Colombian footballer) =

Colombian footballer (born 1992)

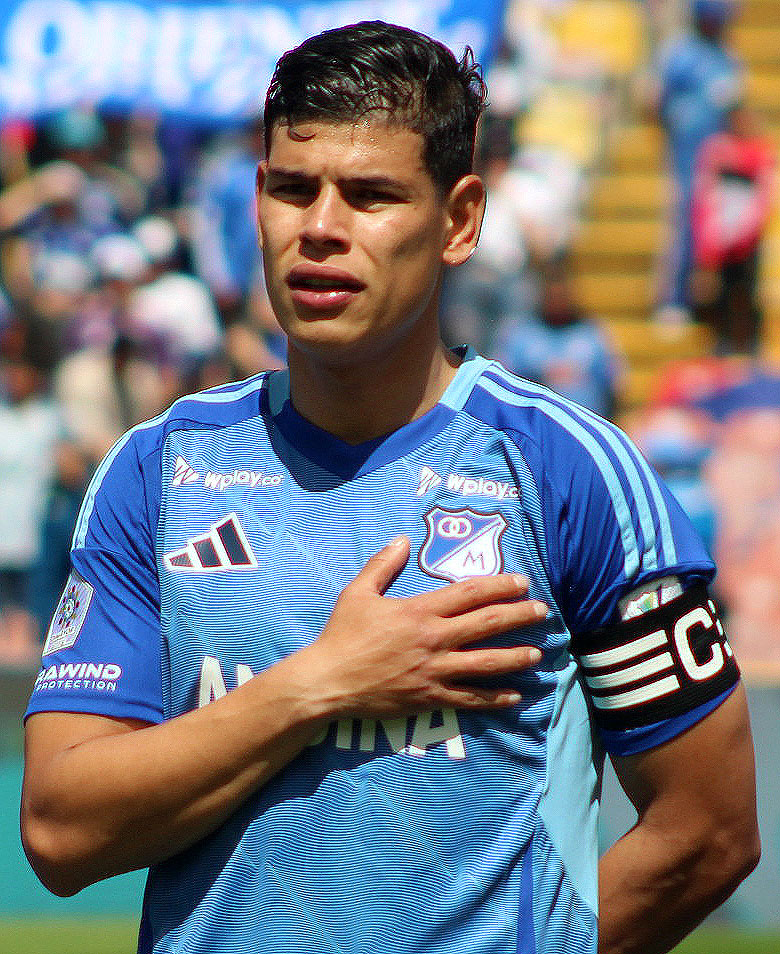

Personal information
- Full name: Jorge Enrique Arias de la Hoz
- Date of birth: 13 November 1992 (age 33)
- Place of birth: Valledupar, Colombia
- Height: 1.83 m (6 ft 0 in)
- Position: Defender

Team information
- Current team: Millonarios
- Number: 17

Senior career*
Years	Team	Apps	(Gls)
2011	Valledupar	15	(1)
2011–2015	Independiente Medellín	56	(1)
2016	Atlético Junior	23	(1)
2016–2017	Independiente Medellín	23	(0)
2017–2018	Atlético Junior	4	(0)
2018–2022	Olimpia	34	(1)
2021	→ Deportivo Cali (loan)	1	(0)
2022	Atlético Junior	35	(0)
2023–	Millonarios	107	(3)
- * Club domestic league appearances and goals as of 12 December 2025

Jorge Enrique Arias de la Hoz (born 13 November 1992) is a Colombian professional footballer who plays as a central defender for Millonarios.

== Honours ==
=== Club ===
Junior

- Copa Colombia (1): 2017

Olimpia Asunción

- Paraguayan Primera División (4) :2018 Clausura, 2019 Apertura, 2019 Clausura, 2020 Clausura

Deportivo Cali

- Categoría Primera A (1): 2021-II

Millonarios

- Categoría Primera A (1): 2023–I
- Superliga Colombiana (1): 2024
