= Andros Townsend =

English footballer (born 1991)

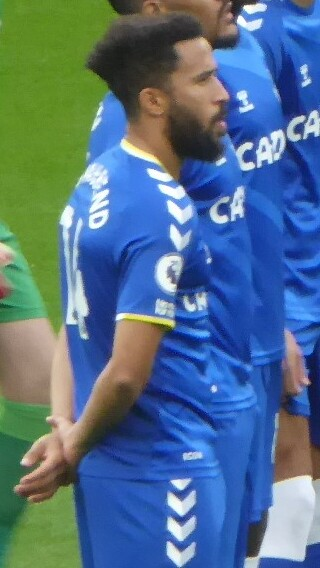
- Townsend with Everton in 2021

Personal information
- Full name: Andros Darryl Townsend
- Date of birth: 16 July 1991 (age 35)
- Place of birth: Leytonstone, London, England
- Height: 1.81 m (5 ft 11 in)
- Position: Right winger

Team information
- Current team: PT Prachuap
- Number: 14

Youth career
- 2000–2009: Tottenham Hotspur

Senior career*
| Years | Team | Apps | (Gls) |
| 2009–2016 | Tottenham Hotspur | 50 | (3) |
| 2009 | → Yeovil Town (loan) | 10 | (1) |
| 2009 | → Leyton Orient (loan) | 22 | (2) |
| 2010 | → Milton Keynes Dons (loan) | 9 | (2) |
| 2010 | → Ipswich Town (loan) | 35 | (2) |
| 2011 | → Watford (loan) | 3 | (0) |
| 2011 | → Millwall (loan) | 11 | (2) |
| 2012 | → Leeds United (loan) | 6 | (1) |
| 2012 | → Birmingham City (loan) | 15 | (0) |
| 2013 | → Queens Park Rangers (loan) | 12 | (2) |
| 2016 | Newcastle United | 13 | (4) |
| 2016–2021 | Crystal Palace | 168 | (13) |
| 2021–2023 | Everton | 21 | (3) |
| 2023–2024 | Luton Town | 28 | (1) |
| 2024–2025 | Antalyaspor | 18 | (0) |
| 2025–2026 | Kanchanaburi Power | 30 | (3) |
| 2026– | PT Prachuap | 1 | (0) |

International career
| 2006–2007 | England U16 | 3 | (0) |
| 2007–2008 | England U17 | 6 | (2) |
| 2009–2010 | England U19 | 6 | (0) |
| 2012–2013 | England U21 | 3 | (0) |
| 2013–2016 | England | 13 | (3) |
- * Club domestic league appearances and goals as of 01:56, 8 September 2026 (UTC)

Andros Darryl Townsend (born 16 July 1991) is an English professional footballer who plays as a right winger for Thai League 1 club PT Prachuap.

A graduate of the Tottenham Hotspur academy, Townsend was initially loaned out to several League One and then Championship clubs alongside limited Tottenham first-team appearances, before making his Premier League debut in September 2012. After further limited appearances and then a half-season loan to Premier League club Queens Park Rangers, Townsend established himself as a Tottenham player between 2013 and 2015. He subsequently fell out of favour at Tottenham, and following a short spell at Newcastle United in the 2015–16 season, he transferred to fellow English side Crystal Palace in the summer of 2016. After five years at Palace, he departed for Everton in 2021, though his time at the club was hampered by a long-term injury sustained in 2022. Upon his release from Everton, in July 2023, he joined Luton Town.

Townsend earned his first England cap on 11 October 2013, and made 13 appearances in his senior international career, scoring three goals.

== Club career ==
=== Tottenham Hotspur ===
==== Early career ====
Townsend joined the Tottenham Hotspur academy at the age of eight. In March 2009, he went on loan to Yeovil Town, making his football league debut against Milton Keynes Dons alongside fellow Spurs academy player Jonathan Obika. He made ten appearances and scored one goal for Yeovil as they avoided relegation.

==== Initial loans ====
Townsend entered the senior Tottenham team under manager Harry Redknapp. In August 2009, he went on a month's loan to League One club Leyton Orient, extended at the end of the month to the end of December, after which he returned to Tottenham. In 26 appearances for Orient, Townsend scored twice, including a "great goal" in a 3–3 draw against Yeovil, passing three opposing players with a run that began in his own half, leading the opposition manager to lament that his players had not been more ruthless and taken him down with a professional foul.

Having not yet made his Tottenham debut, on 14 January 2010, Townsend was again taken on loan by a League One club, Milton Keynes Dons, until the end of the season, although he was recalled after just two months due to injuries. In nine matches for the Dons he had scored twice. The season ended without Townsend having made his debut for Tottenham.

On 12 August 2010, Townsend signed another season-long loan, moving up to the Championship level with Ipswich Town, but this was terminated on 20 December, as Redknapp believed he had not been playing regularly enough. He had played 16 times, scoring once.

==== Tottenham debut and further loans ====
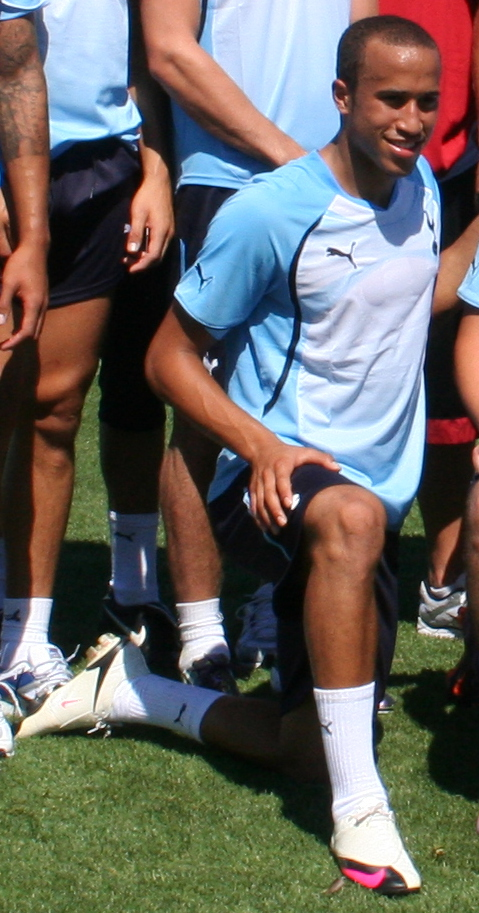
Townsend with Tottenham Hotspur in 2010

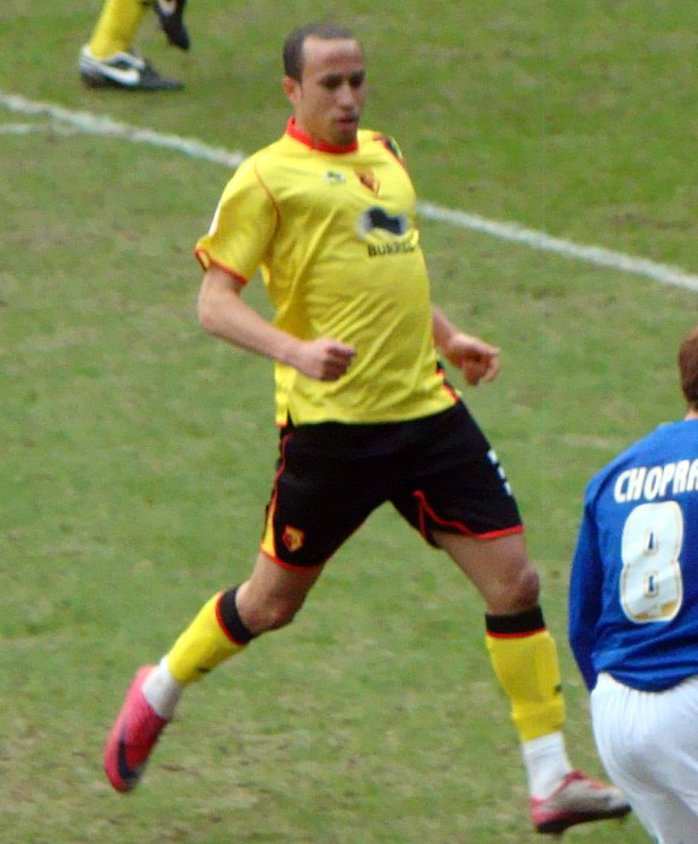
Townsend playing for Watford in 2011

On 9 January 2011, Townsend made his senior Tottenham debut in a third round FA Cup tie at White Hart Lane against Charlton Athletic; he scored the first goal and was voted Man of the Match. This proved to be his only appearance for Tottenham for the rest of the season, with two further loan spells occurring. He joined Championship club Watford on 20 January 2011 on loan until the end of the season, but this was terminated early, on 23 February, with Townsend having made three appearances. On 7 March, Townsend again went on loan to a Championship club until the end of the season, this time Millwall. By April he said he would be happy to stay at the club beyond his loan spell. In 11 appearances he scored twice.

==== European football and further loans ====
For the first half of Tottenham's 2011–12 season, Townsend was a regular in their Europa League campaign, making six appearances in the competition. He scored his second goal for the club in their final match in the competition, against Shamrock Rovers on 15 December 2011, with a curled shot from outside the box. On 23 December, he signed a contract extension, making him a Tottenham player until the end of the 2016 season.

With only one other appearance for Tottenham, in the League Cup, on 1 January 2012, Townsend joined Championship club Leeds United on loan until the end of the season, but with his agent claiming he was unhappy at the club, he switched the loan to their Championship rivals Birmingham City in February. For Leeds, he made seven appearances, including what he described as "a dream debut", and scored once. For Birmingham, he made fifteen league appearances and one in the second leg of their unsuccessful promotion play-off semi-final against Blackpool.

==== Premier League debut ====
Townsend remained with Tottenham for the first half of their 2012–13 season, with the club now under a new manager, André Villas-Boas, who replaced Redknapp in the summer. He made his Premier League debut with a late substitution appearance on 16 September. Although appearing a further four times in the Premier League, these were all still late substitute appearances. Outside the league he made a further five appearances, once in the League Cup and FA Cup respectively, and three times in the Europa League. He scored his third Tottenham goal with a "superb low left-foot shot into the bottom corner from just outside the area" in a 3–0 victory against Carlisle United in the League Cup third round.

==== Loan to Queens Park Rangers ====
On 31 January 2013, Townsend followed Redknapp to Premier League club Queens Park Rangers on loan until the end of the season. He made twelve appearances for the club, including a Man of the Match performance on his debut, scoring two goals in March, a dipping volley from outside the penalty area in a 3–1 win at home to Sunderland, and an equalising deflection in a 3–2 away loss to Aston Villa. QPR were ultimately relegated, and Townsend returned to his parent club.

==== Established in the first team ====
Now back at Tottenham, Townsend started the second Premier League match of their 2013–14 season, and went on to make a total of 33 appearances, including 25 in the league. He scored twice, in a 5–0 away victory over Dinamo Tbilisi in the Europa League (his first match of the season), and his first in the Premier League in a 2–0 victory away to Aston Villa on 20 October 2013. In the middle of the season, Townsend came under the management of his third Tottenham boss, after Villas-Boas was replaced by Tim Sherwood.

Sherwood's contract was terminated at the end of the season, and Townsend started the 2014–15 season under new manager Mauricio Pochettino. He made a total of 35 appearances, scoring five goals, but was reduced to just 17 appearances in the league, having been unable to hold down a starting place until the second half of the season. He started as Tottenham lost 2–0 to Chelsea in the 2015 League Cup Final at Wembley Stadium on 1 March.

Having had nine loan spells, Townsend's career path to regular first team football for Tottenham is often discussed in the context of a wider debate in English football about the best way to develop young talent, contrasting the loan route with Premier League players being developed in Under-21 leagues, or being brought to the Premier League level via transfers from lower league clubs. According to his father, the loan spells were the making of his son's career, while Tottenham's former Director of Football Damien Comolli, who was dismissed in October 2008, believes Townsend succeeded in spite of the way Tottenham handled him.

==== Out of favour ====
On 4 November 2015, having not started a league match of the 2015–16 season, Townsend was dropped from the squad following a touchline argument with the club's fitness coach. He apologised, and Pochettino allowed him to return to the squad by 17 November, stating that the matter was over and he was available for selection again. He was an unused substitute three times following the incident, the last of which was on 10 December, but made no more first-team appearances for Tottenham.

=== Newcastle United ===
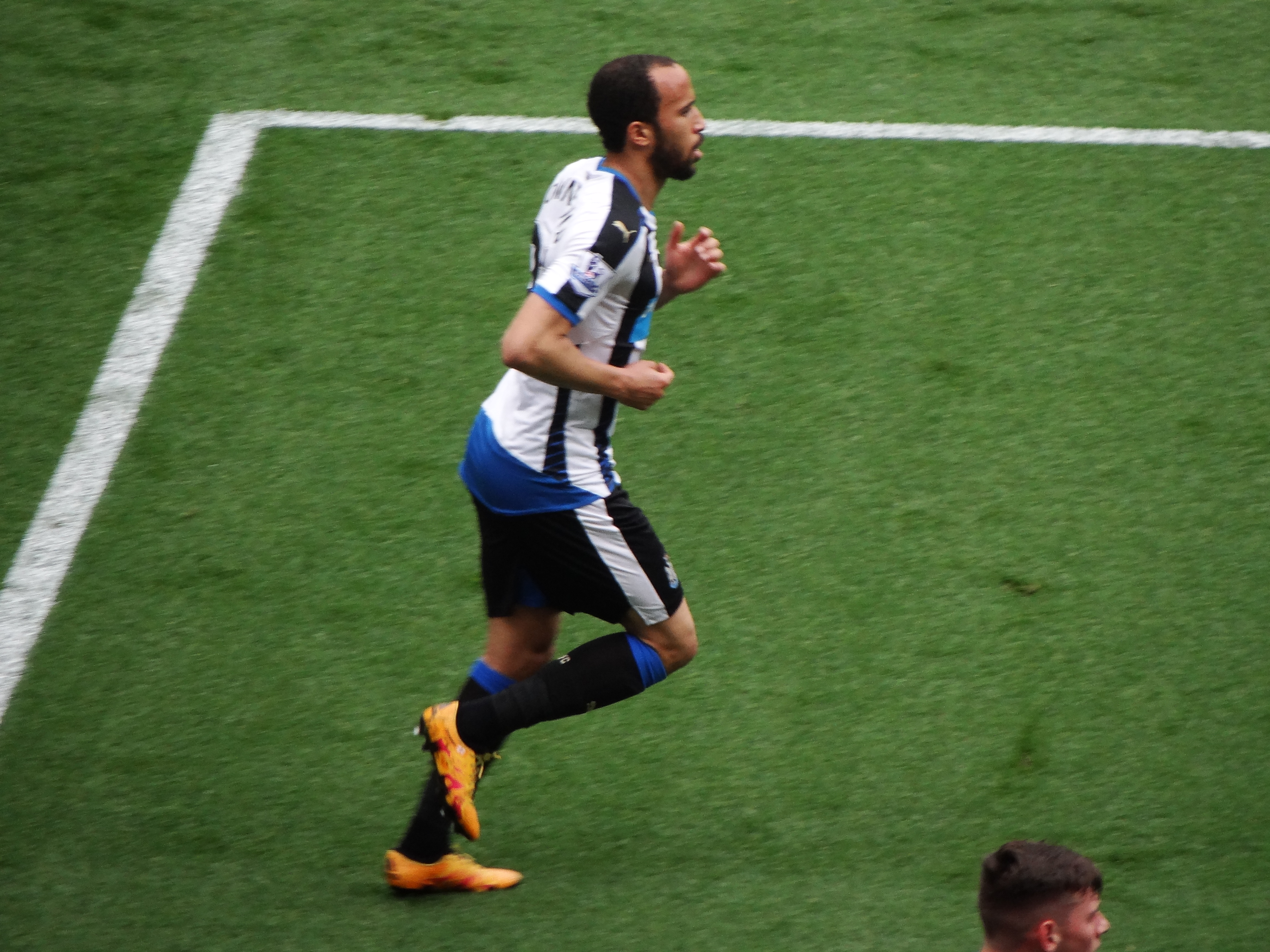
Townsend playing for Newcastle United in 2016

On 26 January 2016, having still not started a league match, Tottenham agreed a transfer fee with Newcastle United for Townsend, reportedly £12 million. Before the fee had been announced, Townsend had already tweeted a goodbye message, and stated "As soon as I knew of Newcastle's interest they were the only club I wanted to join...Two of the best positions you can play in football are centre-forward and left wing at Newcastle. I've got the chance. I could never turn that down. I can't wait to play my first game at St James' Park". The transfer was confirmed the following day, a five-and-a-half-year contract but with the club declining to disclose the fee. On signing, his new manager, Newcastle head coach Steve McClaren, said of Townsend that he is a "winger with an old-fashioned style. He can play on the right or the left, is two-footed, quick, very direct and loves taking on defenders and crossing the ball." According to Sky Sports, the transfer had been under negotiation for a week and Newcastle had initially wanted Townsend on loan, and then had a transfer offer of £10.5m rejected.

Despite his debut for Newcastle being in a disappointing team performance in an away defeat, at the next match, his home debut, he was given a standing ovation after a Man of the Match performance which saw Newcastle climb out of the relegation places. His first goal for the club came in his third match, a shot from just outside the area, but it was just a 90th minute consolation goal in a 5–1 away defeat to Chelsea and the club was relegated to the Championship at the end of the season.

=== Crystal Palace ===
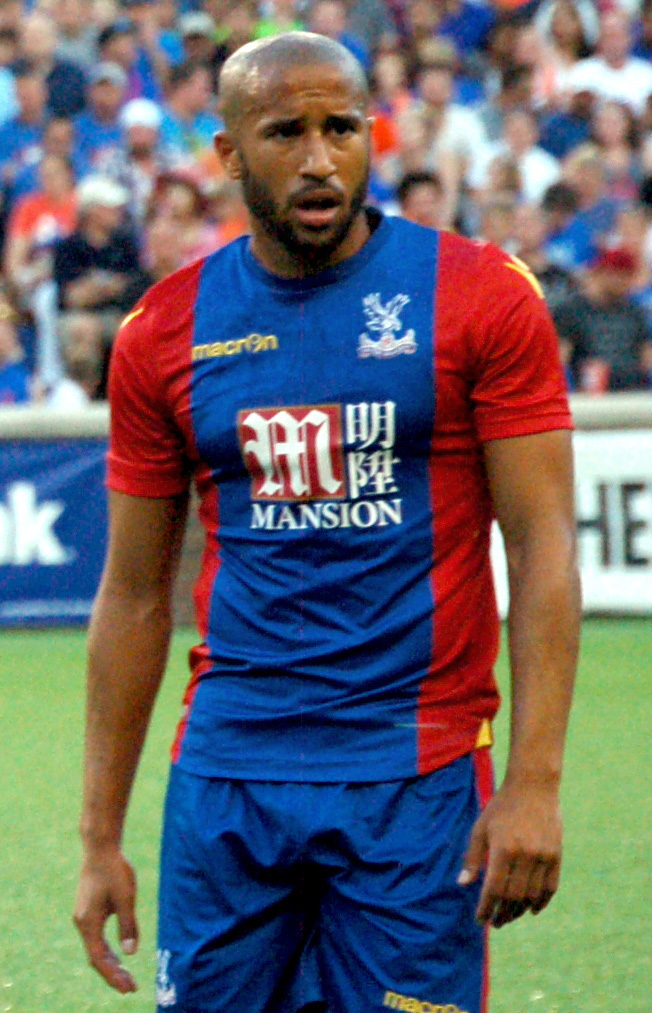
Townsend playing for Crystal Palace in 2016

On 1 July 2016, Townsend joined Premier League club Crystal Palace on a five-year contract from Newcastle following their relegation to the Championship. Palace triggered his £13 million release clause just six months after he joined from Tottenham. He was originally assigned the number 17 shirt for his first season with Palace. However, after Yannick Bolasie left for Everton, Townsend was reassigned the vacant number 10 shirt previously worn by Bolasie. On 13 August 2016, Townsend made his debut in a 1–0 defeat against West Bromwich Albion in the Premier League. He scored his first goal for the club in a 4–1 victory over Stoke City in the league on 18 September.

On 22 December 2018, Townsend scored a 30-yard volley in a 3–2 league win against Manchester City. His strike was later voted as Premier League Goal of the Month for December and Premier League Goal of the Season, as well as making the shortlist for the 2019 FIFA Puskás Award.

In June 2021, Townsend was announced to be one of the players released by Crystal Palace at the end of the 2020–21 season, ending his five-year tenure with the side.

=== Everton ===
On 20 July 2021, Townsend signed for fellow English club Everton on a two-year contract upon the expiry of his contract with Crystal Palace.

Townsend made his debut on 14 August 2021, assisting Richarlison's goal as Everton came from behind to beat Southampton 3–1 on the opening day of the season. On 24 August 2021, Townsend scored the winning goal in an EFL Cup round two fixture against Huddersfield Town. On 13 September 2021, Townsend scored his first Premier League goal for Everton, smashing in a long-range effort from 30 yards to put Everton ahead as they went on to beat Burnley 3–1; this goal won him the Premier League Goal of the Month award.

On 20 March 2022, Townsend was forced off the pitch in the 16th minute of an eventual 4–0 loss against former club Crystal Palace in the quarter-finals of the FA Cup, and was later revealed to have suffered an anterior cruciate ligament injury. Subsequently, he went on to miss the remainder of the 2021–22 season as well as the entirety of the 2022–23 season, after which he departed Everton at the conclusion of his contract, having not played in over 18 months.

=== Luton Town ===
Having been released from Everton in June 2023, Townsend spent preseason on trial with newly promoted Premier League side Burnley as a free agent ahead of the 2023–24 season. It was reported that contractual agreements had initially been made with Burnley, but these were later cancelled prior to the start of the season, leaving Townsend without a club. He later described the collapsed move as "the toughest conversation I've had in my career" and that he was "in tears" when he was informed.

Following the failed move to Burnley, Townsend began a trial with Luton Town, whom also were newly promoted to the Premier League. On 11 October 2023, he officially signed for the club on a short-term contract until January 2024. He made his debut for the club as a substitute in an away league match at Nottingham Forest on 21 October.

On 23 December, Townsend scored his first goal for the Hatters in a 1–0 win over his former club Newcastle United at Kenilworth Road.

In January 2024, Townsend signed a new long-term contract with Luton Town.

=== Antalyaspor ===
On 12 September 2024, Townsend was sold to Turkish club Antalyaspor, signing a two-year contract.

=== Kanchanaburi Power ===
On 5 August 2025, Townsend moved to Thailand, joining newly-promoted Thai League 1 club Kanchanaburi Power. He made his debut for the club coming on as a substitute in a match against Ratchaburi in a 1–1 draw on 16 August.

=== PT Prachuap ===
Townsend left Kanchanaburi following their relegation from the top flight and joined fellow Thai club PT Prachuap in August 2026. In September 2026, Townsend was run over by a pitch roller during warmup for a league match, in what has been described as "a bizarre incident". He reportedly avoided serious injury.

== International career ==
=== Youth levels ===
Townsend represented England at under-16, under-17 and under-19 level. He played three times for the under-16s between 2006 and 2007, making his debut in a 1–1 draw away with Wales on 20 October 2006 and his last appearance in a 2–0 away loss to Germany in April 2007. He scored twice on his under-17 debut, in a 6–1 win over Northern Ireland in August 2007, and went on to make six appearances, the last in a 0–0 draw with Portugal on 5 February 2008. Townsend's first two appearances at under-19 level came in the group stage of the 2009 European Championship; he was an unused substitute in the final, which England lost to Ukraine. He played four times in 2010, once as a starter in a friendly, and three times as a substitute in qualifiers for the 2010 competition.

Townsend received his first call up to the England under-21 team in October 2012 for the Euro 2013 play-off matches against Serbia. He made his debut in the first leg as a 65th-minute substitute for Liverpool's Raheem Sterling. He also played in two U21 friendlies, in 2012 and 2013.

In May 2013, Townsend was charged by The Football Association over alleged breaches of its rules on betting. He subsequently voluntarily withdrew from England's squad for the upcoming European Under-21 Championship finals. He later admitted to charges under the FA's rules for breaching football betting regulations. After a personal hearing, he was fined £18,000 and suspended for four months backdated to 23 May, with three months suspended until 1 July 2016.

=== Senior team ===
Townsend's first call-up to the senior England squad came in September 2013, for the World Cup qualifiers against Moldova and Ukraine. He made his senior debut against Montenegro in a World Cup qualifier on 11 October, during which he scored the third goal of a 4–1 win with a "low swerving finish" from outside the penalty area after 78 minutes, two minutes before being substituted, and was named man of the match. He earned a second cap four days later against Poland, playing almost all of the 2–0 home win. A second England goal came in the Euro 2016 qualification campaign in a 5–0 win over San Marino on 9 October 2014, as he came on for the final third of the match. His next appearance marked his third England goal; on 31 March 2015 he scored the equaliser in the 79th minute against Italy, having come on seven minutes earlier in a friendly match which ended 1–1. The 20-yard strike was described as a "sweet right-foot drive into the bottom corner"; Townsend took to Twitter immediately after the match to respond to Paul Merson after he had said Townsend's club form did not justify him being in the England team.

== Personal life ==
Townsend was born in Leytonstone, Greater London. He is the son of Troy Townsend, Head of Development for Kick It Out. He is of paternal Jamaican and maternal Greek Cypriot descent. He was brought up in Chingford, and is a lifelong Tottenham fan. He attended Rush Croft Sports College. When Townsend was 10, his half-brother Kurtis died in a car accident, aged 18. One of his cousins is Colin Kazim-Richards, also a professional footballer.

Townsend was filmed singing the song "Stand By Me" by Ben E. King with the rest of the Tottenham youth players in the dressing room, which became a popular internet video.

Townsend said in a December 2019 interview that he had been a problem gambler, compulsively betting online on football. He lost £46,000 on a single bet in 2012 on the night before a play-off game for Birmingham. After being caught for breaking the FA's anti-betting rules, he went to counselling. In November 2023, while on a short-term contract with Luton Town, Townsend said he was trying to improve his fitness and prolong his career. He highlighted his consumption of chicken feet, which are high in collagen as a boost to his overall fitness. Townsend worked as a pundit and co-commentator for ITV during the 2022 World Cup, Euro 2024 and 2026 World Cup.

In May 2026, Townsend posted a social media video questioning why people needed to wear sunglasses to protect their eyes from sunlight but not from artificial light. He followed up with another video claiming that when eyes are exposed to sunlight, “Your brain then sends the relevant UV protection back into your body to protect against the sun,” and urging viewers to "Ditch the sunglasses and let your eyes do their job.”

== Career statistics ==
=== Club ===
As of match played 29 September 2025

Appearances and goals by club, season and competition
| Club | Season | League | | | National cup (Note: Includes FA Cup, Turkish Cup) | | League cup | | Other | | Total | |
| Club | Season | Division | Apps | Goals | Apps | Goals | Apps | Goals | Apps | Goals | Apps | Goals |
|---|---|---|---|---|---|---|---|---|---|---|---|---|
| Tottenham Hotspur | 2008–09 | Premier League | 0 | 0 | 0 | 0 | 0 | 0 | 0 | 0 | 0 | 0 |
| Tottenham Hotspur | 2009–10 | Premier League | 0 | 0 | 0 | 0 | — | | — | | 0 | 0 |
| Tottenham Hotspur | 2010–11 | Premier League | 0 | 0 | 1 | 1 | — | | — | | 1 | 1 |
| Tottenham Hotspur | 2011–12 | Premier League | 0 | 0 | — | | 1 | 0 | 6 (Note: Appearances in UEFA Europa League) | 1 | 7 | 1 |
| Tottenham Hotspur | 2012–13 | Premier League | 5 | 0 | 1 | 0 | 1 | 1 | 3 | 0 | 10 | 1 |
| Tottenham Hotspur | 2013–14 | Premier League | 25 | 1 | 0 | 0 | 1 | 0 | 7 | 1 | 33 | 2 |
| Tottenham Hotspur | 2014–15 | Premier League | 17 | 2 | 3 | 1 | 6 | 1 | 9 | 2 | 35 | 6 |
| Tottenham Hotspur | 2015–16 | Premier League | 3 | 0 | 0 | 0 | 1 | 0 | 3 | 0 | 7 | 0 |
| Tottenham Hotspur | Total | | 50 | 3 | 5 | 2 | 10 | 2 | 28 | 4 | 93 | 11 |
| Yeovil Town (loan) | 2008–09 | League One | 10 | 1 | — | | — | | — | | 10 | 1 |
| Leyton Orient (loan) | 2009–10 | League One | 22 | 2 | 0 | 0 | 2 | 0 | 2 (Note: Appearances in Football League Trophy) | 0 | 26 | 2 |
| Milton Keynes Dons (loan) | 2009–10 | League One | 9 | 2 | — | | — | | — | | 9 | 2 |
| Ipswich Town (loan) | 2010–11 | Championship | 13 | 1 | — | | 3 | 0 | — | | 16 | 1 |
| Watford (loan) | 2010–11 | Championship | 3 | 0 | — | | — | | — | | 3 | 0 |
| Millwall (loan) | 2010–11 | Championship | 11 | 2 | — | | — | | — | | 11 | 2 |
| Leeds United (loan) | 2011–12 | Championship | 6 | 1 | 1 | 0 | — | | — | | 7 | 1 |
| Birmingham City (loan) | 2011–12 | Championship | 15 | 0 | — | | — | | 1 (Note: Appearance in Championship play-offs) | 0 | 16 | 0 |
| Queens Park Rangers (loan) | 2012–13 | Premier League | 12 | 2 | — | | — | | — | | 12 | 2 |
| Newcastle United | 2015–16 | Premier League | 13 | 4 | — | | — | | — | | 13 | 4 |
| Crystal Palace | 2016–17 | Premier League | 36 | 3 | 3 | 0 | 1 | 0 | — | | 40 | 3 |
| Crystal Palace | 2017–18 | Premier League | 36 | 2 | 1 | 0 | 2 | 0 | — | | 39 | 2 |
| Crystal Palace | 2018–19 | Premier League | 38 | 6 | 4 | 1 | 3 | 2 | — | | 45 | 9 |
| Crystal Palace | 2019–20 | Premier League | 24 | 1 | 0 | 0 | 1 | 0 | — | | 25 | 1 |
| Crystal Palace | 2020–21 | Premier League | 34 | 1 | 1 | 0 | 1 | 0 | — | | 36 | 1 |
| Crystal Palace | Total | | 168 | 13 | 9 | 1 | 8 | 2 | — | | 185 | 16 |
| Everton | 2021–22 | Premier League | 21 | 3 | 4 | 2 | 2 | 2 | — | | 27 | 7 |
| Everton | 2022–23 | Premier League | 0 | 0 | 0 | 0 | 0 | 0 | — | | 0 | 0 |
| Everton | Total | | 21 | 3 | 4 | 2 | 2 | 2 | — | | 27 | 7 |
| Luton Town | 2023–24 | Premier League | 27 | 1 | 4 | 0 | — | | — | | 31 | 1 |
| Luton Town | 2024–25 (Note: Soccerbase omits Townsend's appearance against Burnley on 12 August 2024.) | Championship | 1 | 0 | — | | — | | — | | 1 | 0 |
| Luton Town | Total | | 28 | 1 | 4 | 0 | — | | — | | 32 | 1 |
| Antalyaspor | 2024–25 | Süper Lig | 18 | 0 | 5 | 2 | — | | — | | 23 | 2 |
| Kanchanaburi Power | 2025–26 | Thai League 1 | 29 | 3 | — | — | — | | — | | 29 | 3 |
| Career total | | | 430 | 38 | 28 | 7 | 25 | 6 | 31 | 4 | 502 | 55 |

=== International ===
As of match played 15 November 2016

Appearances and goals by national team and year
| National team | Year | Apps | Goals |
|---|---|---|---|
| England | 2013 | 4 | 1 |
| England | 2014 | 2 | 1 |
| England | 2015 | 4 | 1 |
| England | 2016 | 3 | 0 |
| Total | | 13 | 3 |

As of match played 15 November 2016. England score listed first, score column indicates score after each Townsend goal.

List of international goals scored by Andros Townsend
| No. | Date | Venue | Cap | Opponent | Score | Result | Competition | Ref. |
|---|---|---|---|---|---|---|---|---|
| 1 | 11 October 2013 | Wembley Stadium, London, England | 1 | Montenegro | 3–1 | 4–1 | 2014 FIFA World Cup qualification | |
| 2 | 9 October 2014 | Wembley Stadium, London, England | 6 | San Marino | 4–0 | 5–0 | UEFA Euro 2016 qualifying | |
| 3 | 31 March 2015 | Juventus Stadium, Turin, Italy | 7 | Italy | 1–1 | 1–1 | Friendly | |

== Honours ==
Tottenham Hotspur

- Football League Cup runner-up: 2014–15

England U19

- UEFA European Under-19 Championship runner-up: 2009

Individual

- Premier League Goal of the Month: March 2017, December 2018, September 2021
- Premier League Goal of the Season: 2018–19
- London Football Awards Goal of the Season: 2019
