= Andrés Llinás =

Colombian footballer (born 1997)

Personal information
- Full name: Andrés Llinás Montejo
- Date of birth: 23 July 1997 (age 29)
- Place of birth: Bogotá, Colombia
- Height: 1.88 m (6 ft 2 in)
- Position: Centre-back

Team information
- Current team: Millonarios
- Number: 26

Youth career
- 2006–2015: Millonarios
- 2011: →Real Madrid (loan)
- 2013: →Hellas Verona (loan)

Senior career*
Years	Team	Apps	(Gls)
2015–	Millonarios	184	(7)
2018	→ Valledupar (loan)	8	(0)

International career^{‡}
2022–	Colombia	3	(0)
- * Club domestic league appearances and goals as of 12 December 2025 ‡ National team caps and goals as of 22:16, 9 December 2023 (UTC)

Andrés Llinás Montejo (born 23 July 1997) is a Colombian professional footballer who plays as a centre-back for Categoría Primera A club Millonarios and the Colombia national team.

== Club career ==
Llinás began playing football with the youth academy of Millonarios at the age of 9 in 2006. He had two stints on loan with the youth academy of Real Madrid and Hellas Verona before returning to Millonarios. He made his professional and Copa Colombia as a late sub with Millonarios in a 1–1 Copa Colombia tie with Tigres on 30 April 2015. He spent the 2018 season on loan with Valledupar in the Categoría Primera B. Returning once more to Millonarios, and after strong performances extended his contract with the club on 30 December 2020.

On 24 June 2023, he scored the tie in the final against Nacional, leaving 1 to 1 in the 90 minutes so that Millonarios later won the round 3 to 2, consecrating himself as an idol of the club after this.

== International career ==
Llinás received his first call-up to the senior Colombia national team for a set of 2022 FIFA World Cup qualification in August 2021. He made his debut with them as a half-time sub in a 2–1 friendly win over Honduras on 16 January 2022.

== Personal life ==
Llinás is of Spanish descent and holds a Spanish passport. His father, Camilo Llinás, is a sports executive in Colombia who was vice president of Millonarios from 2002 to 2003, president of the Liga de fútbol de Bogotá from 2015 to 2020 and vice minister of communications and secretary of the government of the city of Bogotá.

== Career statistics ==
=== International ===
As of match played 9 December 2023

Appearances and goals by national team and year
National team	Year	Apps	Goals
Colombia	2022	2	0
Colombia	2023	1	0
Total		3	0

== Honours ==
Millonarios

- Copa Colombia (1): 2022
- Categoría Primera A (1): 2023–I
- Superliga Colombiana (1): 2024
