= Yilmar Velásquez =

Colombian footballer

Personal information
- Full name: Yilmar Andrés Velásquez Palacios
- Date of birth: 21 August 1999 (age 27)
- Place of birth: Apartadó
- Height: 1.84 m (6 ft 0 in)
- Position: Defensive midfielder

Team information
- Current team: Independiente Santa Fe
- Number: 20

Senior career*
Years	Team	Apps	(Gls)
2019–2021	Atlético Nacional	1	(0)
2021–	Independiente Santa Fe	103	(4)
2022–2023	→ Deportivo Pereira (loan)	41	(1)

International career
2023–	Colombia	1	(0)
- * Club domestic league appearances and goals as of 27 May 2026

Yilmar Andrés Velásquez Palacios (born 21 August 1999) is a Colombian professional footballer who plays as a defensive midfielder for Categoría Primera A side Independiente Santa Fe.

== Club career ==
In 2019, Velásquez made his debut for Atlético Nacional but did not make any more appearances before moving to Independiente Santa Fe in 2021. However, with Independiente he only started one league game. After not making an impression with either of his first two sides Velasquez made a mark at Deportivo Pereira, initially on loan, in 2022 under Alejandro Restrepo, making 24 appearances and helping the side win the league title. Velasquez was quoted as saying that the improvement in his play was helped both by Restrepo, with whom he has worked previously as a youngster, and an increase his own maturity that made him a better teammate, and better in training.

== International career ==
Velásquez made his debut for the Colombia senior side in a friendly match against the United States on January 28, 2023. He was called up again to the Colombia squad for friendly matches against South Korea and Japan in March 2023.

== Honours ==
- Deportivo Pereira:

Categoría Primera A: 2022–II:
