= Edwin Herrera =

Colombian footballer (born 1998)

Personal information
- Full name: Edwin Alberto Herrera Hernandez
- Date of birth: 2 September 1998 (age 28)
- Place of birth: Cartagena, Colombia
- Height: 1.70 m (5 ft 7 in)
- Positions: Right back; left back

Team information
- Current team: Atlético Junior
- Number: 3

Youth career
- Santa Fe

Senior career*
Years	Team	Apps	(Gls)
2018–2022	Santa Fe	93	(3)
2020–2021	→ Famalicão (loan)	14	(0)
2023-	Atlético Junior	91	(3)

International career
2020	Colombia U23	6	(0)
- * Club domestic league appearances and goals as of 15 May 2025

Edwin Alberto Herrera Hernandez (born 2 September 1998) is a Colombian footballer who plays as a right or left back for Atlético Junior.

== Career statistics ==
=== Club ===
As of 10 February 2021.

Club	Season	League			Cup		Continental		Other		Total	
Club	Season	Division	Apps	Goals	Apps	Goals	Apps	Goals	Apps	Goals	Apps	Goals
Santa Fe	2018	Categoría Primera A	14	0	1 (Note: Appearances in the Copa Colombia)	0	6 (Note: Appearances in the Copa Sudamericana)	0	0	0	21	0
Santa Fe	2019	Categoría Primera A	21	2	4	1	0	0	0	0	25	2
Santa Fe	2020	Categoría Primera A	5	0	0	0	0	0	0	0	5	0
Santa Fe	2021	Categoría Primera A	0	0	0	0	0	0	0	0	0	0
Santa Fe	Total		40	2	5	1	6	0	0	0	51	3
Famalicão	2020–21	Liga NOS	10	0	2 (Note: Appearances in the Taça de Portugal)	0	–		0	0	12	0
Career total			50	2	7	1	6	0	0	0	63	3

== Honours ==
Independientemente Santa Fe

- Superliga Colombiana (1):2021

Atlético Junior

- Categoría Primera A (1):2023-II
