= 2012 Superliga Colombiana =

Junior	Atlético Nacional
1	6
- on aggregate

First leg
Junior	Atlético Nacional
1	3
- Date: 18 July 2012
- Venue: Estadio Metropolitano Roberto Meléndez, Barranquilla
- Referee: Ramiro Suárez

Second leg
Atlético Nacional	Junior
3	0
- Date: 22 July 2012
- Venue: Estadio Atanasio Girardot, Medellín
- Referee: Wilson Berrío

The 2012 Superliga Colombiana was the first edition of the Superliga Colombiana. Atlético Nacional was the winner of the tournament.

== Teams ==
Team	Qualification
Atlético Nacional	2011 Apertura champion
Junior	2011 Finalización champion

== Matches ==
=== First leg ===
July 18, 2012
19:05 UTC−5

Junior	1–3	Atlético Nacional
de Almeida 81'	Report	Duque 44', 51'; A. González 90+2' (o.g.)

Estadio Metropolitano Roberto Meléndez, Barranquilla
Attendance: 25,235
Referee: Ramiro Suárez

=== Second leg ===
July 22, 2012
17:30 UTC−5

Atlético Nacional	3–0	Junior
Pajoy 15', 79'; Duque 56'	Report

Estadio Atanasio Girardot, Medellín
Attendance: 27,878
Referee: Wilson Berrío
