= Jefersson Martínez =

Colombian footballer

Personal information
- Full name: Jefersson Justino Martínez Valverde
- Date of birth: 16 August 1993 (age 33)
- Place of birth: Arboletes, Colombia
- Height: 1.87 m (6 ft 2 in)
- Position: Goalkeeper

Team information
- Current team: Atlético Junior
- Number: 30

Youth career
- Envigado F.C.

Senior career*
Years	Team	Apps	(Gls)
2010–2019	Envigado F.C.	97	(0)
2019–2020	Millonarios	11	(0)
2020	Atlético Bucaramanga	15	(0)
2021	Deportes Tolima	11	(0)
2022–	Atlético Junior	38	(0)
- * Club domestic league appearances and goals as of 15 May 2025

Jefersson Justino Martínez Valverde (born 16 August 1993) is a Colombian professional footballer who plays as a goalkeeper for Categoría Primera A side Atlético Junior.

== Honours ==
Deportes Tolima

- Categoría Primera A: 2021–I

Atlético Junior

- Categoría Primera A: 2023–II, 2025–II
