= Yimmi Chará =

Colombian footballer (born 1991)

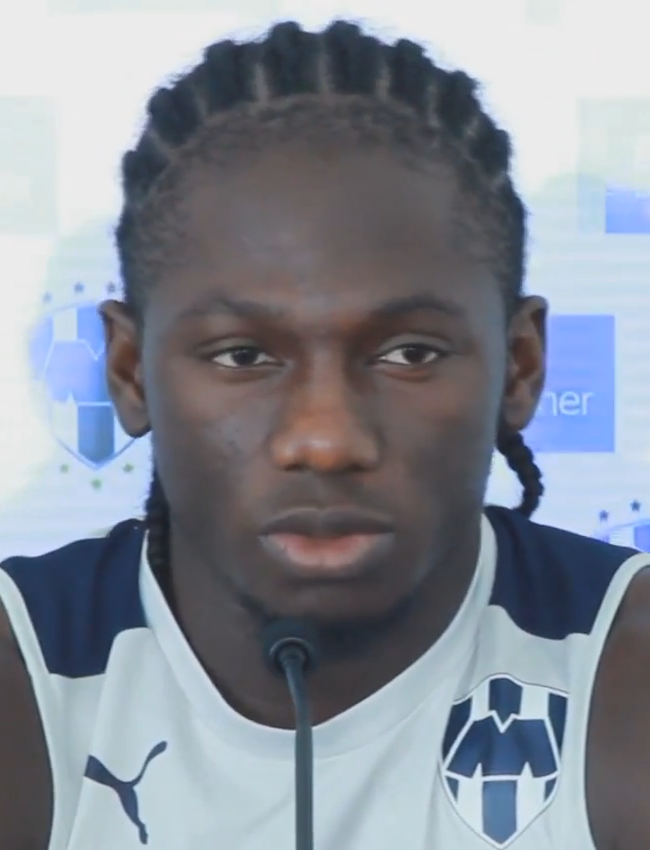
- Chará with Monterrey in 2016

Personal information
- Full name: Yimmi Javier Chará Zamora
- Date of birth: April 2, 1991 (age 35)
- Place of birth: Cali, Colombia
- Height: 1.68 m (5 ft 6 in)
- Position: Winger

Team information
- Current team: Atlético Junior
- Number: 8

Youth career
- Centauros Villavicencio

Senior career*
Years	Team	Apps	(Gls)
2009	Centauros Villavicencio	32	(4)
2010–2014	Deportes Tolima	150	(35)
2015–2017	Monterrey	61	(12)
2015	→ Atlético Nacional (loan)	26	(5)
2016	→ Sinaloa (loan)	16	(1)
2017–2018	Atlético Junior	52	(18)
2018–2019	Atlético Mineiro	60	(9)
2020–2023	Portland Timbers	116	(18)
2024–	Atlético Junior	97	(9)

International career^{‡}
2014–2022	Colombia	16	(1)
Medal record
Men's football
Representing Colombia
Copa América
Third place	2021 Brazil
- * Club domestic league appearances and goals as of 22 January 2025 ‡ National team caps and goals as of 22 January 2025

Yimmi Javier Chará Zamora (born April 2, 1991) is a Colombian professional footballer who plays as a winger for Categoría Primera A club Atlético Junior and the Colombia national team.

== Club career ==
On December 17, 2014, Rayados de Monterrey signed Chará from Deportes Tolima. He was the fifth Colombian in the present tournament joining his compatriots Stefan Medina, Dorlan Pabon as well as Alexander Mejía and Edwin Cardona who just joined the team. In June 2015 Chará was loaned to Atlético Nacional where they became League Champions. Atlético Nacional wanted to extend Chará's contract but on December 17, 2015, Dorados de Sinaloa agreed to signed Chará in a six-month loan deal from Monterrey.

=== Atlético Junior ===
In July 2017, Chará signed for Atlético Junior. He scored 13 goals in 28 games in his first season at Barranquilla, helping Junior win the 2017 Copa Colombia.

=== Atlético Mineiro ===
On June 12, 2018, Chará joined Brazilian club Atlético Mineiro on a five-year contract for a reported fee of €5 million.

=== Portland Timbers ===
On January 2, 2020, Chará joined MLS club Portland Timbers as a Designated Player. It was the first time since his brother Diego left Deportes Tolima in 2011 that they had been at the same club.

== International career ==
On October 3, 2014, Chará was called up to the Colombian senior team, for the first time, by manager José Néstor Pekerman for the team's friendlies against El Salvador and Canada. On August 31, 2017, he made his official debut with Colombia playing an away game against Venezuela. On his third match with the Colombian senior team against Paraguay, he assisted and quickly became a more important player for the Colombian senior team.

In May 2018, he was named in Colombia's preliminary 35-man squad for the 2018 World Cup in Russia. However, he did not make the final cut to 23.

== Personal life ==
Chará's two brothers are also professional football players. Luis Felipe plays for Mineros de Guayana of the Venezuelan Primera División and Diego for the Portland Timbers of Major League Soccer.

== Career statistics ==
=== Club ===
As of 30 October 2019

Appearances and goals by club, season and competition
Club	Season	League			Cup		Continental		Other		Total	
Club	Season	Division	Apps	Goals	Apps	Goals	Apps	Goals	Apps	Goals	Apps	Goals
Tolima	2010	Categoría Primera A	3	0	—		—		—		3	0
Tolima	2011	Categoría Primera A	6	0	—		—		—		6	0
Tolima	2012	Categoría Primera A	34	7	—		3	0	—		37	7
Tolima	2013	Categoría Primera A	41	10	—		8	1	—		49	11
Tolima	2014	Categoría Primera A	35	11	1	1	—		—		36	12
Tolima	Total		119	28	1	1	11	1	0	0	131	30
Monterrey	2014–15	Liga MX	11	1	7	3	—		—		18	4
Monterrey	2016–17	Liga MX	34	3	6	4	3	1	—		43	8
Monterrey	Total		45	4	13	7	3	1	0	0	61	12
Atlético Nacional (loan)	2015	Categoría Primera A	24	5	2	0	—		—		26	5
Dorados (loan)	2015–16	Liga MX	16	1	—		—		—		16	1
Atlético Junior	2017	Categoría Primera A	18	11	2	0	8	2	—		28	13
Atlético Junior	2018	Categoría Primera A	11	4	—		10	2	—		21	6
Atlético Junior	Total		29	15	2	0	18	4	0	0	49	19
Atlético Mineiro	2018	Série A	22	1	—		—		—		22	1
Atlético Mineiro	2019	Série A	18	3	4	2	16	3	8	1	46	9
Atlético Mineiro	Total		40	4	4	2	16	3	8	1	68	10
Career total			273	57	22	10	48	9	8	1	283	67

=== International ===
As of match played 28 January 2021

Appearances and goals by national team and year
National team	Year	Apps	Goals
Colombia	2014	2	0
Colombia	2017	4	0
Colombia	2018	3	1
Colombia	2019	1	0
Colombia	2021	4	0
Colombia	2022	2	0
Total		16	1

Scores and results list Colombia's goal tally first, score column indicates score after each Chará goal.

List of international goals scored by Yimmi Chará
No.	Date	Venue	Opponent	Score	Result	Competition
1	7 September 2018	Hard Rock Stadium, Miami Gardens, United States	Venezuela	2–1	2–1	Friendly

== Honours ==
Deportes Tolima

- Copa Colombia: 2014

Atlético Nacional

- Primera A: 2015–II

Junior

- Copa Colombia: 2017
- Categoría Primera A: 2025–II

Portland Timbers

- MLS is Back
