= Superliga Colombiana =

Superliga BetPlay Dimayor
- Founded: 2012; 14 years ago
- Country: Colombia
- Confederation: CONMEBOL
- Number of clubs: 2
- Current champions: Santa Fe (5th title) (2026)
- Most championships: Santa Fe (5 titles)
- Broadcaster(s): Win+ Fútbol
- Website: dimayor.com.co/super-liga-2/
- Current: 2026 Superliga Colombiana

The Superliga Colombiana (Colombian Superleague), officially known as Superliga BetPlay Dimayor due to sponsorship by online betting company BetPlay, is an official competition contested between the winners of the Apertura and Finalización tournaments of the Colombian Categoría Primera A. The tournament is organized by the División Mayor del Fútbol Colombiano, DIMAYOR. The competition was created in 2012 and is played by the end of January of every year, at the start of each season. Its current champion is Santa Fe, who won its fifth title in 2026, and is also the most successful club in the competition.

== History ==
In early 2012, the idea of a super cup competition between the champions of the Copa Colombia and one of the Categoría Primera A champions started being considered for implementation by DIMAYOR as well as Postobón, who sponsored the competitions organized by DIMAYOR at the time. According to the then chairman of DIMAYOR Ramón Jesurún, the competition would be played in January prior to the start of each season, but the project was yet to be approved.

The Superliga was eventually greenlit by the Assembly of DIMAYOR held on 27 March 2012, in which it was decided that it would be contested by the champions of the two Primera A tournaments played in the previous season (Apertura and Finalización), instead of the Copa Colombia champions as it was originally planned. The first edition of the competition was played by Atlético Nacional and Junior, champions of the 2011 Apertura and 2011 Finalización respectively, in July 2012.

Starting from the 2014 edition, the Superliga champions were awarded a berth to the Copa Sudamericana, qualifying for the Colombia 2 berth of that competition. This arrangement lasted until 2016, due to the change of format of the CONMEBOL club competitions, which started being played simultaneously year-round as well as the fact that both of the Primera A champions are already entitled to play the Copa Libertadores. Due to this, the competition went to only offer an economic incentive to both participants.

For 2020, and due to the schedule saturation caused by the 2020 CONMEBOL Pre-Olympic Tournament which was held in January 2020 as well as the 2020 Copa América which Colombia was originally selected to co-host and was scheduled for June, DIMAYOR considered playing the Superliga in May 2020 as a single match at a neutral venue outside the country, with Miami as the tentative host city, however, those plans were cancelled due to the COVID-19 pandemic and the competition kept its usual home-and-away format.

== Format ==
The competition is played as a double-legged series between the champions of the Categoría Primera A tournaments of the preceding season (Apertura and Finalización). The better placed team in the aggregate table of the previous season hosts the second leg. If both teams are tied in points at the end of the second leg, the team with the better goal difference will be the champion, and if still drawn the winner is decided in a penalty shootout.

In the event one team wins both tournaments of the season, its rival in the competition will be the best-placed team in the aggregate table of the previous season.

== Editions ==
Keys

- A: Torneo Apertura champion.
- F: Torneo Finalización champion.
- R: Qualified via aggregate table.
- C: League champion (in case only one league tournament was played in the prior season).
- (In bracket, title count):

Ed.	Year	Champion	Scores	Runner-up
1	2012	Atlético Nacional (1) (A)	3–1, 3–0	Junior (F)
2	2013	Santa Fe (1) (A)	2–1, 1–0	Millonarios (F)
3	2014	Deportivo Cali (1) (R) (Note: Since Atlético Nacional won both the Apertura and Finalización tournaments, Deportivo Cali qualified for being the second best team in the aggregate table of the 2013 season.)	2–1, 0–1 (4–3 p)	Atlético Nacional (A - F)
4	2015	Santa Fe (2) (F)	1–2, 2–0	Atlético Nacional (A)
5	2016	Atlético Nacional (2) (F)	2–0, 3–0	Deportivo Cali (A)
6	2017	Santa Fe (3) (F)	0–0, 1–0	Independiente Medellín (A)
7	2018	Millonarios (1) (F)	0–0, 2–1	Atlético Nacional (A)
8	2019	Junior (1) (F)	1–2, 1–0 (3–0 p)	Deportes Tolima (A)
9	2020	Junior (2) (A)	1–2, 2–0	América de Cali (F)
10	2021 (Note: Since the 2020 Primera A season only had one tournament played instead of the usual two due to the COVID-19 pandemic, the 2021 Superliga was played by América de Cali as Primera A champions and Santa Fe as the best-placed team in the aggregate table of the 2020 season.)	Santa Fe (4) (R)	2–1, 3–2	América de Cali (C)
11	2022	Deportes Tolima (1) (A)	1–1, 1–0	Deportivo Cali (F)
12	2023	Atlético Nacional (3) (A)	1–0, 4–3	Deportivo Pereira (F)
13	2024	Millonarios (2) (A)	0–1, 2–0	Junior (F)
14	2025	Atlético Nacional (4) (F)	1–1, 0–0 (4–3 p)	Atlético Bucaramanga (A)
15	2026	Santa Fe (5) (A)	1–1, 3–0	Junior (F)

== Performance by club ==
Club	Titles	Runners-up	Seasons won	Seasons runner-up
Santa Fe	5	—	2013, 2015, 2017, 2021, 2026	—
Atlético Nacional	4	3	2012, 2016, 2023, 2025	2014, 2015, 2018
Junior	2	3	2019, 2020	2012, 2024, 2026
Millonarios	2	1	2018, 2024	2013
Deportivo Cali	1	2	2014	2016, 2022
Deportes Tolima	1	1	2022	2019
América de Cali	—	2	—	2020, 2021
Independiente Medellín	—	1	—	2017
Deportivo Pereira	—	1	—	2023
Atlético Bucaramanga	—	1	—	2025
