= 2018 Copa Sudamericana finals =

- Event: 2018 Copa Sudamericana
Junior	Atlético Paranaense
(Colombia)	(Brazil)
2	2
- on aggregate Atlético Paranaense won 4–3 on penalties

First leg
Junior	Atlético Paranaense
1	1
- Date: 5 December 2018
- Venue: Estadio Metropolitano Roberto Meléndez, Barranquilla
- Referee: Diego Haro (Peru)
- Attendance: 38,094

Second leg
Atlético Paranaense	Junior
1	1
- After extra time
- Date: 12 December 2018
- Venue: Arena da Baixada, Curitiba
- Referee: Roberto Tobar (Chile)
- Attendance: 40,263

The 2018 Copa Sudamericana finals was the two-legged final to decide the winner of the 2018 Copa Sudamericana, the 17th edition of the Copa Sudamericana, South America's secondary international club football tournament organized by CONMEBOL.

The finals were contested in two-legged home-and-away format between Colombian team Junior and Brazilian team Atlético Paranaense. The first leg was hosted by Junior at the Estadio Metropolitano Roberto Meléndez in Barranquilla on 5 December 2018, while the second leg was hosted by Atlético Paranaense at the Arena da Baixada in Curitiba on 12 December 2018. This was the last final to take place over two legs, as starting from 2019 the final will be played as a single match at a venue chosen in advance.

Tied 2–2 on aggregate, Atlético Paranaense won 4–3 on penalties, winning the tournament for the first time in their history. As champions, Atlético Paranaense earned the right to play against the winners of the 2018 Copa Libertadores in the 2019 Recopa Sudamericana, and the winners of the 2018 J.League Cup in the 2019 J.League Cup / Copa Sudamericana Championship. Atlético Paranaense also automatically qualified for the group stage of the 2019 Copa Libertadores.

== Teams ==
Team	Previous finals appearances (bold indicates winners)
(Colombia) Junior	None
(Brazil) Atlético Paranaense	None

== Venues ==
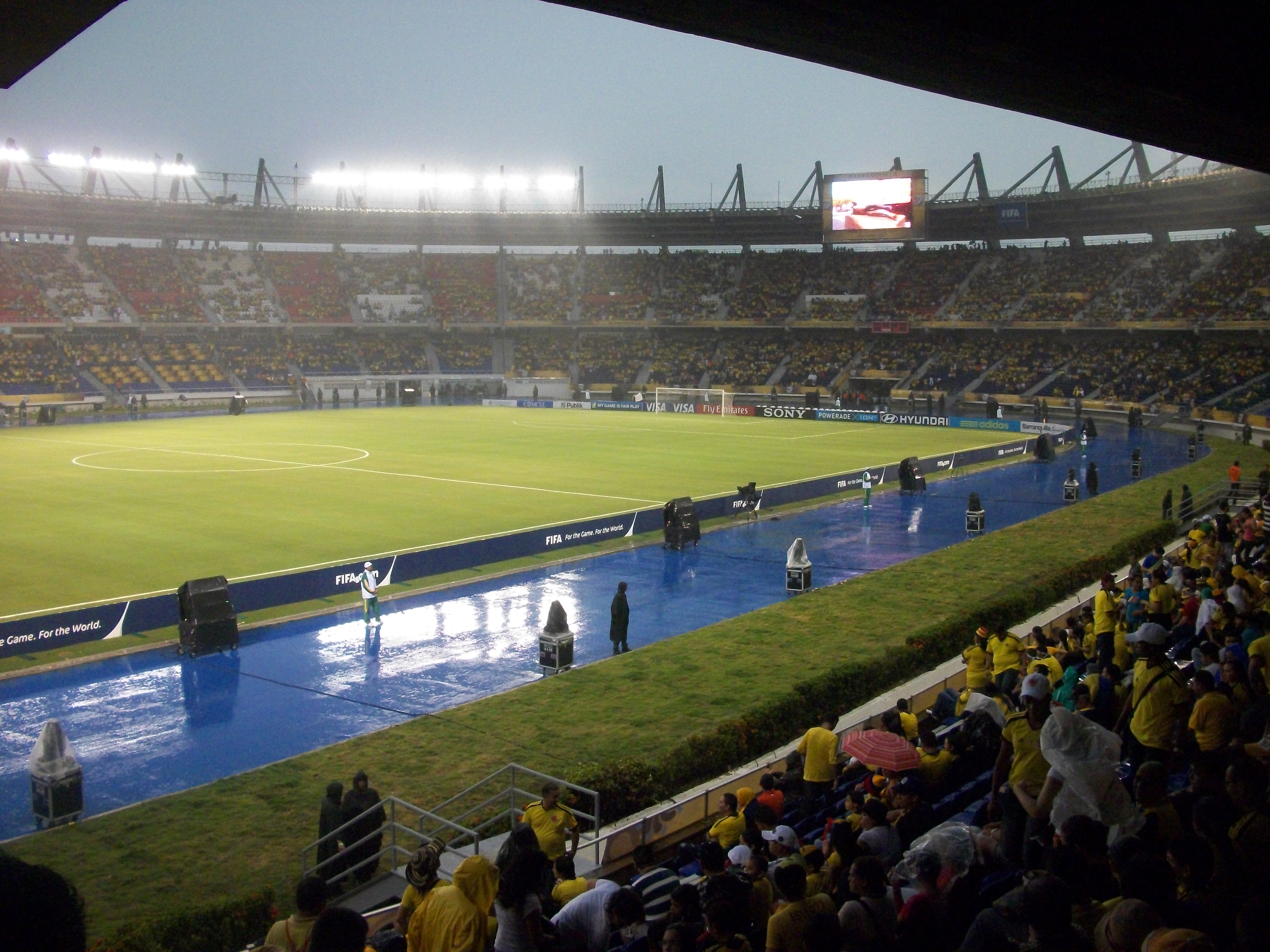
The Estadio Metropolitano Roberto Meléndez in Barranquilla, Colombia, hosted the first leg.

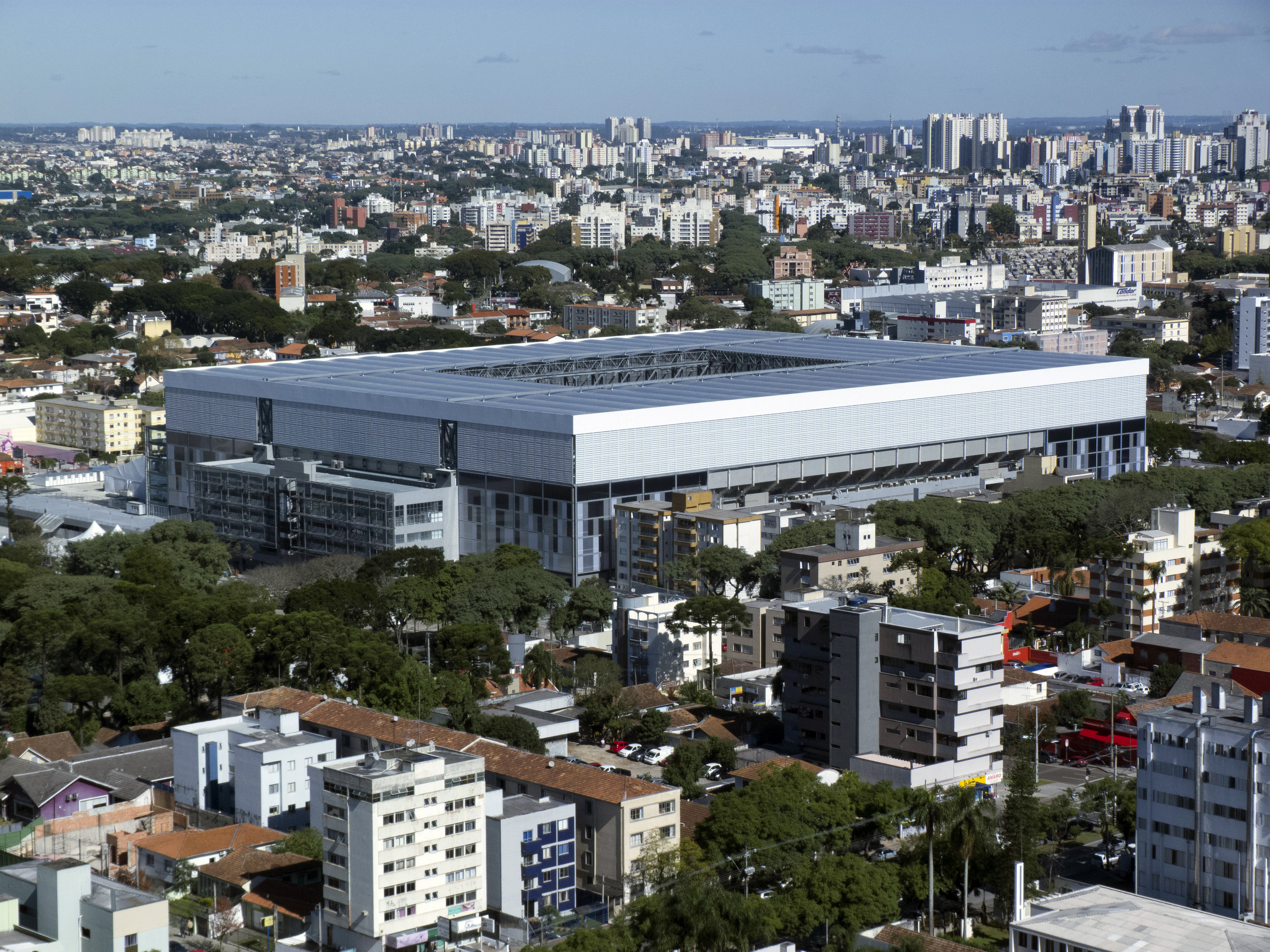
The Arena da Baixada in Curitiba, Brazil, hosted the second leg.

== Road to the final ==
Note: In all results below, the score of the finalist is given first (H: home; A: away).

(Colombia) Junior				Round	(Brazil) Atlético Paranaense			
**Copa Libertadores**					**Copa Sudamericana**			
Opponent	Agg.	1st leg	2nd leg	Qualifying stages	Qualified for Copa Sudamericana			
(Paraguay) Olimpia	3–2	0–1 (A)	3–1 (H)	Second stage	Qualified for Copa Sudamericana			
(Paraguay) Guaraní	1–0	1–0 (H)	0–0 (A)	Third stage	Qualified for Copa Sudamericana			
Opponent	Result			Group stage	Qualified for Copa Sudamericana			
(Brazil) Palmeiras	0–3 (H)			Matchday 1	Qualified for Copa Sudamericana			
(Argentina) Boca Juniors	0–1 (A)			Matchday 2	Qualified for Copa Sudamericana			
(Peru) Alianza Lima	2–0 (A)			Matchday 3	Qualified for Copa Sudamericana			
(Peru) Alianza Lima	1–0 (H)			Matchday 4	Qualified for Copa Sudamericana			
(Argentina) Boca Juniors	1–1 (H)			Matchday 5	Qualified for Copa Sudamericana			
(Brazil) Palmeiras	1–3 (A)			Matchday 6	Qualified for Copa Sudamericana			
**Group H third place**: Pos / Team / Pld / Pts; 1 / (Brazil) Palmeiras / 6 / **16**; 2 / (Argentina) Boca Juniors / 6 / **9**; **3** / (Colombia) Junior / **6** / **7**; 4 / (Peru) Alianza Lima / 6 / **1**; Source: CONMEBOL				Final standings	Qualified for Copa Sudamericana			
**Copa Sudamericana**					Qualified for Copa Sudamericana			
Opponent	Agg.	1st leg	2nd leg		Opponent	Agg.	1st leg	2nd leg
Bye				First stage	(Argentina) Newell's Old Boys	4–2	3–0 (H)	1–2 (A)
(Argentina) Lanús	1–1 (3–2 p)	0–1 (A)	1–0 (H)	Second stage	(Uruguay) Peñarol	6–1	2–0 (H)	4–1 (A)
(Argentina) Colón	2–1	1–0 (H)	1–1 (A)	Round of 16	(Venezuela) Caracas	4–1	2–0 (A)	2–1 (H)
(Argentina) Defensa y Justicia	3–3 (a)	2–0 (H)	1–3 (A)	Quarter-finals	(Brazil) Bahia	1–1 (4–1 p)	1–0 (A)	0–1 (H)
(Colombia) Santa Fe	3–0	2–0 (A)	1–0 (H)	Semi-finals	(Brazil) Fluminense	4–0	2–0 (H)	2–0 (A)

== Format ==
The final was played on a home-and-away two-legged basis, with the higher-seeded team (Atlético Paranaense) hosting the second leg. The away goals rule was not applied, and extra time would be played if the aggregate score was tied after the second leg. If the aggregate score was still tied after extra time, a penalty shoot-out would have been used to determine the winner. If extra time was played, a fourth substitution would have been allowed.

== Matches ==
=== First leg ===
5 December 2018
19:45 UTC−5

Junior (Colombia)	1–1	(Brazil) Atlético Paranaense
González 52'	Report	Pablo 50'

Estadio Metropolitano Roberto Meléndez, Barranquilla
Attendance: 38,094
Referee: Diego Haro (Peru)

**Junior**	**Atlético Paranaense**

GK	1	(Uruguay) Sebastián Viera (c)
RB	20	(Colombia) Marlon Piedrahita
CB	21	(Colombia) Jefferson Gómez
CB	5	(Colombia) Rafa Pérez	(yellow card) 68'
LB	2	(Colombia) Germán Gutiérrez
CM	15	(Colombia) Luis Narváez		(substituted off) 83'
CM	24	(Colombia) Víctor Cantillo
RM	6	(Colombia) James Sánchez		(substituted off) 70'
AM	10	(Colombia) Jarlan Barrera
LM	23	(Colombia) Luis Díaz
CF	18	(Colombia) Yony González		(substituted off) 66'
Substitutes:
GK	12	(Colombia) José Luis Chunga
DF	4	(Colombia) David Murillo
DF	13	(Colombia) Jonathan Ávila
MF	7	(Colombia) Sebastián Hernández		(substituted on) 83'
MF	28	(Colombia) Enrique Serje
FW	11	(Colombia) Daniel Moreno		(substituted on) 70'
FW	27	(Colombia) Luis Carlos Ruiz		(substituted on) 66'
Manager:
(Uruguay) Julio Comesaña

GK	1	(Brazil) Santos
RB	2	(Brazil) Jonathan
CB	4	(Brazil) Thiago Heleno	(yellow card) 90+3'
CB	14	(Brazil) Léo Pereira	(yellow card) 55'
LB	6	(Brazil) Renan Lodi
CM	3	(Argentina) Lucho González (c)		(substituted off) 86'
CM	16	(Brazil) Bruno Guimarães	(yellow card) 90+1'
RM	10	(Brazil) Marcelo Cirino
AM	7	(Brazil) Raphael Veiga		(substituted off) 77'
LM	11	(Brazil) Nikão
CF	5	(Brazil) Pablo		(substituted off) 60'
Substitutes:
GK	12	(Brazil) Felipe Alves
DF	25	(Brazil) Wanderson
DF	26	(Brazil) Márcio Azevedo
MF	20	(Brazil) Matheus Rossetto
MF	28	(Brazil) Wellington		(substituted on) 77'
FW	9	(Brazil) Rony		(substituted on) 60'
FW	22	(Brazil) Marcinho		(substituted on) 86'
Manager:
(Brazil) Tiago Nunes

Assistant referees:
Jonny Bossio (Peru)
Víctor Raez (Peru)
Fourth official:
Carlos Orbe (Ecuador)
Video assistant referee:
Gery Vargas (Bolivia)
Assistant video assistant referees:
Alexis Herrera (Venezuela)
Carlos Astroza (Chile)

**Match rules**

- 90 minutes.
- Seven named substitutes, of which up to three may be used.

=== Second leg ===
12 December 2018
21:45 UTC−2

Atlético Paranaense (Brazil)	1–1 (a.e.t.)	(Colombia) Junior
Pablo 26'	Report	T. Gutiérrez 57'
Penalties
Jonathan (penalty scored); Raphael Veiga (penalty scored); Bergson (penalty scored); Renan Lodi (penalty missed); Thiago Heleno (penalty scored)	4–3	(penalty scored) Narváez; (penalty missed) Fuentes; (penalty scored) Pérez; (penalty missed) T. Gutiérrez; (penalty scored) Viera

Arena da Baixada, Curitiba
Attendance: 40,263
Referee: Roberto Tobar (Chile)

**Atlético Paranaense**	**Junior**

GK	1	(Brazil) Santos
RB	2	(Brazil) Jonathan	(yellow card) 38'
CB	4	(Brazil) Thiago Heleno
CB	14	(Brazil) Léo Pereira
LB	6	(Brazil) Renan Lodi
CM	3	(Argentina) Lucho González (c)		(substituted off) 73'
CM	16	(Brazil) Bruno Guimarães
RM	10	(Brazil) Marcelo Cirino		(substituted off) 46'
AM	7	(Brazil) Raphael Veiga
LM	11	(Brazil) Nikão		(substituted off) 98'
CF	5	(Brazil) Pablo		(substituted off) 98'
Substitutes:
GK	12	(Brazil) Felipe Alves
DF	13	(Brazil) Paulo André
DF	26	(Brazil) Márcio Azevedo
MF	28	(Brazil) Wellington	(yellow card) 110'	(substituted on) 73'
FW	9	(Brazil) Rony		(substituted on) 46'
FW	22	(Brazil) Marcinho		(substituted on) 98'
FW	30	(Brazil) Bergson		(substituted on) 98'
Manager:
(Brazil) Tiago Nunes

GK	1	(Uruguay) Sebastián Viera (c)
RB	20	(Colombia) Marlon Piedrahita	(yellow card) 101'
CB	21	(Colombia) Jefferson Gómez	(yellow card) 90'	(substituted off) 106'
CB	5	(Colombia) Rafa Pérez
LB	17	(Colombia) Gabriel Fuentes
CM	15	(Colombia) Luis Narváez	(yellow card) 77'
CM	24	(Colombia) Víctor Cantillo
RM	6	(Colombia) James Sánchez		(substituted off) 73'
AM	10	(Colombia) Jarlan Barrera		(substituted off) 115'
LM	23	(Colombia) Luis Díaz
CF	29	(Colombia) Teófilo Gutiérrez
Substitutes:
GK	12	(Colombia) José Luis Chunga
DF	4	(Colombia) David Murillo
DF	13	(Colombia) Jonathan Ávila		(substituted on) 106'
MF	7	(Colombia) Sebastián Hernández
MF	28	(Colombia) Enrique Serje
FW	11	(Colombia) Daniel Moreno		(substituted on) 115'
FW	18	(Colombia) Yony González	(yellow card) 76'	(substituted on) 73'
Manager:
(Uruguay) Julio Comesaña

Assistant referees:
Christian Schiemann (Chile)
Claudio Rios (Chile)
Fourth official:
Roddy Zambrano (Ecuador)
Video assistant referee:
Julio Bascuñán (Chile)
Assistant video assistant referees:
Piero Maza (Chile)
Carlos Astroza (Chile)

**Match rules**

- 90 minutes.
- 30 minutes of extra time if tied on aggregate (no away goals rule applied).
- Penalty shoot-out if still tied after extra time.
- Seven named substitutes, of which up to three may be used, with a fourth allowed in extra time.

== See also ==
- 2018 Copa Libertadores finals
- 2019 Recopa Sudamericana
- 2019 J.League Cup / Copa Sudamericana Championship
