= 2022 Superliga Colombiana =

Deportivo Cali	Deportes Tolima
1	2

First leg
Deportivo Cali	Deportes Tolima
1	1
- Date: 9 February 2022
- Venue: Estadio Deportivo Cali, Palmira
- Referee: Bismarks Santiago

Second leg
Deportes Tolima	Deportivo Cali
1	0
- Date: 23 February 2022
- Venue: Estadio Manuel Murillo Toro, Ibagué
- Referee: John Hinestroza

The 2022 Superliga Colombiana (officially known as the Superliga BetPlay DIMAYOR 2022 for sponsorship purposes) was the eleventh edition of the Superliga Colombiana, Colombia's football super cup tournament organized by DIMAYOR. It was contested by Deportes Tolima and Deportivo Cali, champions of the 2021 Categoría Primera A season tournaments, from 9 to 23 February 2022.

Deportes Tolima won their first title in the competition, defeating Deportivo Cali by a 2–1 aggregate score.

== Teams ==
Team	Qualification	Previous appearances (bold indicates winners)
Deportes Tolima	2021 Apertura champions	1 (2019)
Deportivo Cali	2021 Finalización champions	2 (**2014**, 2016)

== Matches ==
=== First leg ===
9 February 2022
20:00 UTC−5

Deportivo Cali	1–1	Deportes Tolima
Robles 33'	Report	Ibargüen 67'

Estadio Deportivo Cali, Palmira
Referee: Bismarks Santiago

**Deportivo Cali**	**Deportes Tolima**

GK	12	(Uruguay) Guillermo de Amores
RB	17	(Colombia) Aldair Gutiérrez
CB	3	(Argentina) Guillermo Burdisso
CB	2	(Colombia) Jorge Marsiglia
LB	32	(Colombia) Christian Mafla
CM	24	(Colombia) Carlos Robles	(yellow card) 87'
CM	8	(Chile) Sebastián Leyton	(substituted off) 85'
RW	70	(Colombia) Jhon Vásquez	(yellow card) 23'	(substituted off) 75'
AM	29	(Colombia) Teófilo Gutiérrez (c)	(yellow card) 89'
LW	21	(Colombia) Kevin Velasco	(yellow card) 78'
CF	9	(Colombia) Ángelo Rodríguez	(yellow card) 30'	(substituted off) 90'
Substitutes:
GK	1	(Colombia) Humberto Acevedo
DF	4	(Colombia) José Caldera
DF	14	(Colombia) Juan Esteban Franco
MF	5	(Colombia) Andrés Balanta	(substituted on) 85'
MF	10	(Colombia) Michael Ortega
MF	13	(Colombia) Santiago Mosquera	(substituted on) 75'
FW	19	(Colombia) Carlos Lucumí	(substituted on) 90'
Manager:
(Venezuela) Rafael Dudamel

GK	1	(Colombia) William Cuesta
RB	13	(Colombia) Juan Camilo Angulo
CB	3	(Colombia) Julián Quiñónes (c)
CB	5	(Colombia) José Moya	(yellow card) 76'
LB	20	(Colombia) Junior Hernández
CM	6	(Colombia) Brayan Rovira
CM	14	(Colombia) Juan David Ríos	(yellow card) 63'
RW	28	(Colombia) Luis Miranda	(substituted off) 46'
AM	10	(Colombia) Daniel Cataño	(yellow card) 6'	(substituted off) 66'
LW	21	(Colombia) Andrés Ibargüen	(yellow card) 63'
CF	27	(Paraguay) Gustavo Ramírez	(yellow card) 23'	(substituted off) 78'
Substitutes:
GK	22	(Ecuador) Alexander Domínguez
DF	23	(Colombia) Eduar Caicedo
MF	11	(Colombia) Anderson Plata	(substituted on) 46'
MF	26	(Colombia) Cristian Trujillo
MF	30	(Venezuela) Yohandry Orozco
FW	17	(Colombia) Michael Rangel	(substituted on) 78'
FW	33	(Colombia) Jeison Lucumí	(substituted on) 66'
Manager:
(Colombia) Hernán Torres

Assistant referees:
John Gallego
Diego Flechas
Fourth official:
Jorge Duarte
Video assistant referee:
John Perdomo
Assistant video assistant referee:
Mauricio Pérez

**Match rules**

- 90 minutes.
- Seven named substitutes.
- Maximum of five substitutions.

=== Second leg ===
23 February 2022
20:00 UTC−5

Deportes Tolima	1–0	Deportivo Cali
Rangel 54'	Report

Estadio Manuel Murillo Toro, Ibagué
Referee: John Hinestroza

**Deportes Tolima**	**Deportivo Cali**

GK	1	(Colombia) William Cuesta
RB	13	(Colombia) Juan Camilo Angulo
CB	3	(Colombia) Julián Quiñónes (c)
CB	5	(Colombia) José Moya
LB	20	(Colombia) Junior Hernández
CM	6	(Colombia) Brayan Rovira
CM	14	(Colombia) Juan David Ríos	(yellow card) 62'
RW	33	(Colombia) Jeison Lucumí
AM	8	(Peru) Raziel García	(substituted off) 71'
LW	21	(Colombia) Andrés Ibargüen	(substituted off) 85'
CF	17	(Colombia) Michael Rangel	(substituted off) 78'
Substitutes:
GK	22	(Ecuador) Alexander Domínguez
DF	16	(Colombia) Sergio Mosquera
MF	18	(Chile) Rodrigo Ureña
MF	26	(Colombia) Cristian Trujillo	(substituted on) 85'
MF	28	(Colombia) Luis Miranda
MF	30	(Venezuela) Yohandry Orozco	(substituted on) 71'
FW	9	(Colombia) Juan Fernando Caicedo	(substituted on) 78'
Manager:
(Colombia) Hernán Torres

GK	12	(Uruguay) Guillermo de Amores
RB	17	(Colombia) Aldair Gutiérrez
CB	3	(Argentina) Guillermo Burdisso
CB	2	(Colombia) Jorge Marsiglia	(yellow card) 89'
LB	32	(Colombia) Christian Mafla
CM	5	(Colombia) Andrés Balanta
CM	8	(Chile) Sebastián Leyton	(substituted off) 75'
RW	7	(Colombia) Jhon Vásquez
AM	21	(Colombia) Kevin Velasco	(substituted off) 83'
LW	11	(Colombia) Yony González	(substituted off) 76'
CF	29	(Colombia) Teófilo Gutiérrez (c)	(yellow card) 69'
Substitutes:
GK	1	(Colombia) Humberto Acevedo
DF	4	(Colombia) José Caldera
DF	14	(Colombia) Juan Esteban Franco
MF	10	(Colombia) Michael Ortega
MF	13	(Colombia) Santiago Mosquera	(substituted on) 83'
MF	24	(Colombia) Carlos Robles	(substituted on) 75'
FW	9	(Colombia) Ángelo Rodríguez	(substituted on) 76'
Manager:
(Venezuela) Rafael Dudamel

Assistant referees:
Wílmar Navarro
John León
Fourth official:
Néver Manjarrés
Video assistant referee:
Jorge Guzmán
Assistant video assistant referee:
Ricardo García

**Match rules**

- 90 minutes.
- Penalty shoot-out if tied on aggregate.
- Seven named substitutes.
- Maximum of five substitutions.

Deportes Tolima won 2–1 on aggregate.

Superliga Colombiana
2022 champions

**1st title**
