= 2020 Superliga Colombiana =

Junior	América de Cali
3	2

First leg
Junior	América de Cali
1	2
- Date: 8 September 2020
- Venue: Estadio Romelio Martínez, Barranquilla
- Referee: Andrés Rojas

Second leg
América de Cali	Junior
0	2
- Date: 11 September 2020
- Venue: Estadio Pascual Guerrero, Cali
- Referee: Edilson Ariza

The 2020 Superliga Colombiana (known as the Superliga Águila 2020 for sponsorship purposes) was the ninth edition of the Superliga Colombiana. It was contested by the champions of the 2019 Categoría Primera A season from 8 to 11 September 2020.

The competition, which is usually played in January prior to the start of each Categoría Primera A season, was originally scheduled to be played in the middle of the year due to the schedule saturation caused by the 2020 CONMEBOL Pre-Olympic Tournament and the start of the Primera A tournament in that same month. By February, DIMAYOR was considering to play the Superliga on 31 May 2020 as a single match at a neutral venue outside the country, with Miami as the tentative host city. These plans were put on hold due to the COVID-19 pandemic and the suspension of every football tournament. On 31 August 2020, with the announcement of the resumption of the tournaments organized by DIMAYOR, the competition was eventually confirmed to be played on 8 and 11 September 2020, with its usual double-legged series format.

Junior won its second Superliga Colombiana title following a 3–2 win over América de Cali on aggregate.

== Teams ==
Team	Qualification	Previous appearances (bold indicates winners)
Junior	2019 Apertura champions	2 (2012, **2019**)
América de Cali	2019 Finalización champions	None

== Matches ==
=== First leg ===
8 September 2020
19:30 UTC−5

Junior	1–2	América de Cali
Borja 4' (pen.)	Report	Fuentes 81' (o.g.); Vergara 82'

Estadio Romelio Martínez, Barranquilla
Attendance: 0 (Note: Matches played behind closed doors due to the COVID-19 pandemic.)
Referee: Andrés Rojas

**Junior**	**América de Cali**

GK	1	(Uruguay) Sebastián Viera (c)
DF	27	(Colombia) Fabián Viáfara
DF	24	(Colombia) Daniel Rosero
DF	16	(Colombia) Germán Mera	(red card) 23'
DF	17	(Colombia) Gabriel Fuentes
MF	18	(Colombia) Didier Moreno	(yellow card) 36'
MF	14	(Colombia) Leonardo Pico	(substituted off) 83'
MF	10	(Venezuela) Luis González	(substituted off) 30'
FW	29	(Colombia) Teófilo Gutiérrez	(yellow card) 30'	(substituted off) 53'
FW	19	(Colombia) Carmelo Valencia
FW	9	(Colombia) Miguel Borja	(substituted off) 53'
Substitutes:
GK	22	(Colombia) Reinaldo Fontalvo
DF	4	(Colombia) Willer Ditta	(substituted on) 30'
DF	26	(Colombia) Jesús David Murillo	(substituted on) 53'
DF	20	(Colombia) Marlon Piedrahita
MF	5	(Colombia) Larry Vásquez	(substituted on) 83'	(yellow card) 90+1'
MF	7	(Colombia) Sherman Cárdenas
FW	28	(Colombia) Edwuin Cetré	(substituted on) 53'
Manager:
(Uruguay) Julio Comesaña

GK	12	(Colombia) Eder Chaux
DF	13	(Colombia) Daniel Quiñones	(substituted off) 46'
DF	2	(Colombia) Marlon Torres
DF	16	(Argentina) Juan Pablo Segovia	(yellow card) 56'
DF	3	(Colombia) Edwin Velasco
MF	19	(Colombia) Luis Paz
MF	15	(Colombia) Rafael Carrascal
MF	7	(Colombia) Jhon Arias	(substituted off) 61'
MF	4	(Colombia) Carlos Sierra	(substituted off) 77'
MF	11	(Colombia) Duván Vergara
FW	20	(Colombia) Adrián Ramos (c)
Substitutes:
GK	1	(Venezuela) Joel Graterol
DF	29	(Colombia) Kevin Andrade
MF	6	(Colombia) Felipe Jaramillo
MF	18	(Chile) Rodrigo Ureña	(substituted on) 84'
MF	10	(Colombia) Yesus Cabrera	(substituted on) 46'	(yellow card) 69'	(substituted off) 84'
MF	30	(Colombia) Santiago Moreno	(substituted on) 77'
FW	8	(Colombia) Juan David Pérez	(substituted on) 61'	(yellow card) 68'
Manager:
(Argentina) Juan Cruz Real

Assistant referees:
Miguel Roldán
Herminsul Calderón
Fourth official:
Bismark Santiago

**Match rules**

- 90 minutes.
- Seven named substitutes.
- Maximum of five substitutions.

=== Second leg ===
11 September 2020
19:00 UTC−5

América de Cali	0–2	Junior
	Report	Hinestroza 10'; Valencia 82'

Estadio Pascual Guerrero, Cali
Attendance: 0
Referee: Edilson Ariza

**América de Cali**	**Junior**

GK	12	(Colombia) Eder Chaux
DF	13	(Colombia) Daniel Quiñones	(substituted off) 58'
DF	2	(Colombia) Marlon Torres	(yellow card) 25'
DF	16	(Argentina) Juan Pablo Segovia
DF	3	(Colombia) Edwin Velasco	(yellow card) 15'
MF	15	(Colombia) Rafael Carrascal	(yellow card) 55'
MF	19	(Colombia) Luis Paz	(yellow card) 72'
MF	4	(Colombia) Carlos Sierra	(substituted off) 59'
FW	7	(Colombia) Jhon Arias	(substituted off) 89'
FW	20	(Colombia) Adrián Ramos (c)
FW	11	(Colombia) Duván Vergara
Substitutes:
GK	1	(Venezuela) Joel Graterol
DF	29	(Colombia) Kevin Andrade
MF	6	(Colombia) Felipe Jaramillo
MF	18	(Chile) Rodrigo Ureña	(substituted on) 58'
MF	24	(Colombia) Luis Sánchez
MF	30	(Colombia) Santiago Moreno	(substituted on) 59'
FW	8	(Colombia) Juan David Pérez	(substituted on) 89'
Manager:
(Argentina) Juan Cruz Real

GK	1	(Uruguay) Sebastián Viera (c)
DF	20	(Colombia) Marlon Piedrahita
DF	24	(Colombia) Daniel Rosero
DF	16	(Colombia) Germán Mera
DF	17	(Colombia) Gabriel Fuentes	(yellow card) 90+2'
MF	10	(Venezuela) Luis González	(substituted off) 90+3'
MF	18	(Colombia) Didier Moreno	(yellow card) 90+7'
MF	14	(Colombia) Leonardo Pico
MF	8	(Colombia) Fredy Hinestroza	(yellow card) 53'	(substituted off) 87'
FW	9	(Colombia) Miguel Borja	(substituted off) 70'
FW	29	(Colombia) Teófilo Gutiérrez	(red card) 90+5'
Substitutes:
GK	22	(Colombia) Reinaldo Fontalvo
DF	4	(Colombia) Willer Ditta
DF	27	(Colombia) Fabián Viáfara	(substituted on) 90+3'
MF	5	(Colombia) Larry Vásquez
MF	7	(Colombia) Sherman Cárdenas
FW	20	(Colombia) Carmelo Valencia	(substituted on) 70'	(yellow card) 83'
FW	28	(Colombia) Edwuin Cetré	(substituted on) 87'	(yellow card) 90+4'
Manager:
(Uruguay) Julio Comesaña

Assistant referees:
Alejandro Gallego
John Gómez
Fourth official:
Luis Fernando Trujillo

**Match rules**

- 90 minutes.
- Penalty shoot-out if tied on aggregate.
- Seven named substitutes.
- Maximum of five substitutions.

Junior won 3–2 on aggregate.
