= 2021 Superliga Colombiana =

América de Cali	Santa Fe
3	5

First leg
América de Cali	Santa Fe
1	2
- Date: 5 October 2021
- Venue: Estadio Pascual Guerrero, Cali
- Referee: Alexander Ospina

Second leg
Santa Fe	América de Cali
3	2
- Date: 20 October 2021
- Venue: Estadio El Campín, Bogotá
- Referee: Wilmar Roldán

The 2021 Superliga Colombiana (officially known as the Superliga BetPlay DIMAYOR 2021 for sponsorship purposes) was the tenth edition of the Superliga Colombiana, Colombia's football super cup tournament organized by DIMAYOR. It was contested by América de Cali and Santa Fe from 5 to 20 October 2021.

The competition, which is usually played in January prior to the start of each Categoría Primera A season, was delayed to October 2021 due to the schedule saturation of both involved sides and a lack of available dates in early 2021.

Santa Fe beat América de Cali by a 5–3 aggregate score to win its fourth Superliga Colombiana title.

== Teams ==
Due to the COVID-19 pandemic in Colombia causing the curtailing of the 2020 Categoría Primera A season which only had one champion instead of the usual two, DIMAYOR confirmed that the competition would also be contested by the best ranked team in the aggregate table of the 2020 season, Santa Fe, in addition to the league champions América de Cali.

Team	Qualification	Previous appearances (bold indicates winners)
América de Cali	2020 Primera A champions	1 (2020)
Santa Fe	2020 Primera A aggregate table best placed team	3 (**2013**, **2015**, **2017**)

== Matches ==
=== First leg ===
5 October 2021
19:45 UTC−5

América de Cali	1–2	Santa Fe
Sierra 26'	Report	Velásquez 55'; Ramos 81'

Estadio Pascual Guerrero, Cali
Referee: Alexander Ospina

**América de Cali**	**Santa Fe**

GK	12	(Colombia) Diego Novoa
DF	35	(Colombia) Geovan Montes
DF	24	(Colombia) Jhon Palacios	(substituted off) 63'
DF	3	(Colombia) Jerson Malagón	(substituted off) 59'
DF	16	(Colombia) Pablo Ortiz
DF	5	(Colombia) Héctor Quiñones (c)
MF	4	(Colombia) Carlos Sierra	(substituted off) 58'
MF	18	(Chile) Rodrigo Ureña	(substituted off) 59'
MF	27	(Colombia) Emerson Batalla
MF	14	(Colombia) Mauricio Gómez
FW	30	(Colombia) Carlos Barreiro	(substituted off) 58'
Substitutes:
GK	31	(Colombia) David Quintero
DF	23	(Colombia) Jorge Segura	(substituted on) 59'
DF	29	(Colombia) Kevin Andrade	(substituted on) 63'
MF	19	(Colombia) Luis Paz	(substituted on) 58'	(yellow card) 79'
MF	28	(Colombia) Larry Angulo	(substituted on) 59'	(yellow card) 66'
FW	7	(Colombia) Gustavo Torres	(substituted on) 58'
FW	10	(Colombia) Deinner Quiñones
Manager:
(Colombia) Juan Carlos Osorio

GK	22	(Colombia) Leandro Castellanos (c)
DF	27	(Colombia) Alexander Porras
DF	2	(Colombia) Fainer Torijano	(yellow card) 83'
DF	31	(Colombia) José Ortiz
DF	30	(Colombia) Dairon Mosquera
MF	8	(Colombia) Juan Pedroza	(yellow card) 88'
MF	17	(Colombia) Alexander Mejía
MF	5	(Colombia) Carlos Sánchez
MF	10	(Colombia) Jhon Velásquez	(substituted off) 80'
MF	13	(Colombia) Kelvin Osorio	(substituted off) 80'
FW	19	(Panama) Ronaldo Dinolis	(substituted off) 65'
Substitutes:
GK	1	(Colombia) Omar Rodríguez
DF	21	(Colombia) Fabio Delgado	(substituted on) 80'	(yellow card) 90+2'
DF	25	(Colombia) Alejandro Moralez
MF	7	(Colombia) Neyder Moreno
MF	14	(Colombia) Leonardo Pico
MF	24	(Colombia) Jersson González	(substituted on) 80'
FW	9	(Colombia) Jorge Luis Ramos	(substituted on) 65'
Manager:
(Colombia) Grigori Méndez

Assistant referees:
Elkin Echavarría
Javier Zemanate
Fourth official:
Yahir Cárdenas

**Match rules**

- 90 minutes.
- Seven named substitutes.
- Maximum of five substitutions.

=== Second leg ===
20 October 2021
20:20 UTC−5 (Note: The kickoff for the second leg was originally scheduled at 20:00, but was delayed by 20 minutes for TV broadcast reasons since the earlier 2021 Copa Colombia semi-final 2nd leg match between Deportivo Pereira and Deportes Tolima was delayed by rain.)

Santa Fe	3–2	América de Cali
Pedroza 34'; Velásquez 47'; Dinolis 78'	Report	Sierra 12'; Ramos 90+2' (pen.)

Estadio El Campín, Bogotá
Referee: Wilmar Roldán

**Santa Fe**	**América de Cali**

GK	22	(Colombia) Leandro Castellanos (c)	(yellow card) 90+2'
DF	27	(Colombia) Alexander Porras	(yellow card) 73'
DF	2	(Colombia) Fainer Torijano	(red card) 89'
DF	31	(Colombia) José Ortiz	(yellow card) 90+1'
DF	30	(Colombia) Dairon Mosquera
MF	8	(Colombia) Juan Pedroza	(substituted off) 90+3'
MF	17	(Colombia) Alexander Mejía	(yellow card) 84'
MF	5	(Colombia) Carlos Sánchez	(substituted off) 66'
MF	10	(Colombia) Jhon Velásquez	(yellow card) 48'	(substituted off) 66'
MF	7	(Colombia) Neyder Moreno	(yellow card) 42'	(substituted off) 58'
FW	9	(Colombia) Jorge Luis Ramos	(yellow card) 37'	(substituted off) 66'
Substitutes:
GK	1	(Colombia) Omar Rodríguez
DF	21	(Colombia) Fabio Delgado
DF	25	(Colombia) Alejandro Moralez	(substituted on) 90+3'
MF	13	(Colombia) Kelvin Osorio	(substituted on) 58'
MF	14	(Colombia) Leonardo Pico	(substituted on) 66'
MF	23	(Colombia) Johan Caballero	(substituted on) 66'
FW	19	(Panama) Ronaldo Dinolis	(substituted on) 66'	(red card) 89'
Manager:
(Colombia) Grigori Méndez

GK	1	(Venezuela) Joel Graterol
DF	29	(Colombia) Kevin Andrade	(substituted off) 54'
DF	2	(Colombia) Marlon Torres
DF	23	(Colombia) Jorge Segura	(yellow card) 70'
DF	5	(Colombia) Héctor Quiñones (c)	(substituted off) 54'
MF	4	(Colombia) Carlos Sierra	(substituted off) 54'
MF	18	(Chile) Rodrigo Ureña
MF	27	(Colombia) Emerson Batalla	(substituted off) 54'
MF	21	(Colombia) Jeison Lucumí
FW	30	(Colombia) Carlos Barreiro	(substituted off) 66'
FW	7	(Colombia) Gustavo Torres
Substitutes:
GK	12	(Colombia) Diego Novoa
DF	16	(Colombia) Pablo Ortiz
DF	17	(Colombia) Cristian Arrieta	(substituted on) 54'	(red card) 89'
MF	14	(Colombia) Mauricio Gómez	(substituted on) 54'
MF	28	(Colombia) Larry Angulo	(substituted on) 54'	(red card) 89'
FW	10	(Colombia) Deinner Quiñones	(substituted on) 54'
FW	20	(Colombia) Adrián Ramos	(substituted on) 66'
Manager:
(Colombia) Juan Carlos Osorio

Assistant referees:
John León
Mario Tarache
Fourth official:
Luis Matorel

**Match rules**

- 90 minutes.
- Penalty shoot-out if tied on aggregate.
- Seven named substitutes.
- Maximum of five substitutions.

Santa Fe won 5–3 on aggregate.

Superliga Colombiana
2021 champions

**4th title**
