= Enrique Serje =

Colombian footballer (born 1996)

Personal information
- Full name: Enrique Carlos Serje Orozco
- Date of birth: 10 January 1996 (age 30)
- Place of birth: Sabanalarga, Atlántico, Colombia
- Height: 1.80 m (5 ft 11 in)
- Position: Defensive midfielder

Senior career*
Years	Team	Apps	(Gls)
2014–2016	Barranquilla	16	(0)
2016–2023	Atlético Junior	51	(1)
2019	→ Once Caldas (loan)	12	(0)
2020–2021	→ Santa Fe (loan)	17	(1)
2023	Santa Fe	7	(0)
2024	Jaguares de Córdoba	36	(2)
2025	Everton	10	(0)
- * Club domestic league appearances and goals as of 31 December 2025

Enrique Carlos Serje Orozco (born 10 January 1996) is a Colombian professional footballer who plays as a defensive midfielder.

== Club career ==
In 2025, Serje moved abroad and signed with Chilean club Everton de Viña del Mar.

== Career statistics ==
As of 19 February 2017

Club	Season	League^{1}		Cup^{2}		CONMEBOL^{3}		Total	
Club	Season	Apps	Goals	Apps	Goals	Apps	Goals	Apps	Goals
Barranquilla	2014	1	0	1	0	0	0	2	0
Barranquilla	2015	1	0	2	0	0	0	3	0
Barranquilla	2016	14	0	1	0	0	0	15	0
Barranquilla	Total	16	0	4	0	0	0	20	0
Junior	2016	10	0	7	0	3	0	20	0
Junior	2017	2	0	0	0	0	0	2	0
Junior	Total	12	0	7	0	3	0	22	0
Career Total		28	0	11	0	3	0	42	0

^{1} Includes Categoría Primera B and Categoría Primera A matches.
^{2} Includes Copa Colombia matches only.
^{3} Includes Copa Sudamericana matches only.

== Honours ==
Atlético Junior

- Copa Colombia: 2017
- Categoría Primera A: 2018–II, 2019–I
- Superliga Colombiana: 2019

Santa Fe

- Superliga Colombiana: 2021
