= James Sánchez (footballer) =

Colombian footballer (born 1988)

Personal information
- Full name: James Sánchez Altamiranda
- Date of birth: 4 May 1988 (age 38)
- Place of birth: Barranquilla, Colombia
- Height: 1.75 m (5 ft 9 in)
- Position: Midfielder

Senior career*
Years	Team	Apps	(Gls)
2008–2010	Valledupar		
2010–2014	San Francisco		
2014–2015	Uniautónoma	45	(5)
2016–2020	Junior	142	(9)
2021	Independiente Medellín	12	(0)
2021	Alianza Petrolera	12	(0)
2022	Unión Magdalena	23	(4)
- * Club domestic league appearances and goals as of 15 July 2023

James Amilkar Sánchez Altamiranda (Spanish pronunciation: [ˈxamesˈsantʃes]; born 4 May 1988) is a Colombian professional footballer who played as a central midfielder.

== Honours ==
=== Club ===
Junior

- Categoría Primera A (2): 2018–II, 2019–I
- Copa Colombia (1): 2017
- Superliga Colombiana (2): 2019, 2020
