= Luis Narváez =

Colombian footballer (born 1984)

Personal information
- Full name: Luis Manuel Narváez Pitalua
- Date of birth: 11 July 1984 (age 42)
- Place of birth: Barranquilla, Colombia
- Height: 1.79 m (5 ft 10 in)
- Position: Defensive midfielder

Team information
- Current team: Unión Magdalena
- Number: 15

Senior career*
Years	Team	Apps	(Gls)
2004–2008	Unión Magdalena		
2009	Cúcuta Deportivo	63	(6)
2010	Unión Magdalena		
2011	Cúcuta Deportivo	17	(0)
2011–2019	Junior	229	(14)
2020–2021	Unión Magdalena	7	(3)
- * Club domestic league appearances and goals as of 18:56, 26 April 2020 (UTC)

Luis Manuel Narváez Pitalua (born 11 July 1984) is a former Colombian professional footballer who played as a defensive midfielder and occasionally centre back.

== Honours ==
=== Club ===
Atlético Junior

- Categoría Primera A: 2011-II, 2018-II, 2019-I
- Copa Colombia: 2015, 2017
- Superliga Colombiana: 2019
