= 2019 Superliga Colombiana =

| Junior | Deportes Tolima |
| 2 | 2 |
- on aggregate Junior won 3–0 on penalties

First leg
| Junior | Deportes Tolima |
| 1 | 2 |
- Date: 23 January 2019
- Venue: Estadio Metropolitano Roberto Meléndez, Barranquilla
- Referee: Carlos Betancur

Second leg
| Deportes Tolima | Junior |
| 0 | 1 |
- Date: 27 January 2019
- Venue: Estadio Manuel Murillo Toro, Ibagué
- Referee: Mario Herrera

The 2019 Superliga Colombiana (known as the 2019 Superliga Águila for sponsorship purposes) was the eighth edition of the Superliga Colombiana. It was contested by the champions of the 2018 Categoría Primera A season from 23 to 27 January 2019.

Junior won their first Superliga title following a 3–0 win on penalty kicks against Deportes Tolima, after tying 2–2 on aggregate score.

== Teams ==
| Team | Qualification | Previous appearances (bold indicates winners) |
|---|---|---|
| Deportes Tolima | 2018 Apertura champions | None |
| Junior | 2018 Finalización champions | 1 (2012) |

== Matches ==
=== First leg ===
23 January 2019
19:45 UTC−5

| Junior | 1–2 | Deportes Tolima |
|---|---|---|
| Díaz 9' | Report | Pérez 14', 44' |

Estadio Metropolitano Roberto Meléndez, Barranquilla
Attendance: 15,599
Referee: Carlos Betancur

| **Junior** | **Deportes Tolima** |

| GK | 1 | (Uruguay) Sebastián Viera (c) |
| DF | 20 | (Colombia) Marlon Piedrahita | (yellow card) 43' | (substituted off) 71' |
| DF | 5 | (Colombia) Rafael Pérez | (yellow card) 43' |
| DF | 21 | (Colombia) Jefferson Gómez |
| DF | 17 | (Colombia) Gabriel Fuentes |
| MF | 15 | (Colombia) Luis Narváez |
| MF | 8 | (Colombia) Fredy Hinestroza | (substituted off) 77' |
| MF | 24 | (Colombia) Víctor Cantillo |
| MF | 10 | (Colombia) Luis Díaz |
| FW | 29 | (Colombia) Teófilo Gutiérrez |
| FW | 27 | (Colombia) Luis Carlos Ruiz | (substituted off) 61' |
Substitutes:
| GK | 12 | (Colombia) José Luis Chunga |
| DF | 4 | (Colombia) Jesús David Murillo |
| DF | 13 | (Colombia) Willer Ditta |
| MF | 6 | (Colombia) James Sánchez | (substituted on) 77' |
| MF | 7 | (Colombia) Sebastián Hernández |
| MF | 11 | (Colombia) Daniel Moreno | (substituted on) 71' |
| FW | 9 | (Colombia) Michael Rangel | (substituted on) 61' |
Manager:
(Colombia) Luis Fernando Suárez

| GK | 31 | (Colombia) Álvaro Montero |
| DF | 21 | (Colombia) Juan Guillermo Arboleda |
| DF | 16 | (Colombia) Sergio Mosquera |
| DF | 3 | (Colombia) Julián Quiñones (c) |
| DF | 20 | (Colombia) Danovis Banguero |
| MF | 24 | (Colombia) Carlos Robles | (yellow card) 45+1' |
| MF | 15 | (Venezuela) Luis González | (yellow card) 81' | (substituted off) 82' |
| MF | 7 | (Colombia) Carlos Rentería |
| MF | 14 | (Colombia) Rafael Carrascal | (yellow card) 27' | (substituted off) 72' |
| MF | 10 | (Colombia) Daniel Cataño | (substituted off) 65' |
| FW | 18 | (Colombia) Marco Pérez |
Substitutes:
| GK | 1 | (Colombia) William Cuesta |
| DF | 4 | (Costa Rica) Juan Pablo Vargas | (substituted on) 82' |
| MF | 23 | (Colombia) Jaminton Campaz | (substituted on) 72' |
| FW | 11 | (Paraguay) Luis Nery Caballero | (substituted on) 65' |
| FW | 19 | (Colombia) Diego Valdés |
| FW | 25 | (Colombia) Maicol Balanta |
Manager:
(Colombia) Alberto Gamero

Assistant referees:
Cristian de la Cruz
Yinfar Bulla
Fourth official:
Jorge Tabares

**Match rules**

- 90 minutes.
- Seven named substitutes.
- Maximum of three substitutions.

=== Second leg ===
27 January 2019
15:00 UTC−5

| Deportes Tolima | 0–1 | Junior |
|---|---|---|
| | Report | Ruiz 90+2' |
Penalties
| Mosquera (penalty missed); Robles (penalty missed); Gordillo (penalty missed) | 0–3 | (penalty scored) Hernández; (penalty scored) Cantillo; (penalty scored) Pérez |

Estadio Manuel Murillo Toro, Ibagué
Attendance: 15,000
Referee: Mario Herrera

| **Deportes Tolima** | **Junior** |

| GK | 31 | (Colombia) Álvaro Montero |
| DF | 21 | (Colombia) Juan Guillermo Arboleda | (yellow card) 7' |
| DF | 16 | (Colombia) Sergio Mosquera | (yellow card) 43' |
| DF | 3 | (Colombia) Julián Quiñones (c) |
| DF | 20 | (Colombia) Danovis Banguero |
| MF | 24 | (Colombia) Carlos Robles |
| MF | 15 | (Venezuela) Luis González | (substituted off) 81' |
| MF | 7 | (Colombia) Carlos Rentería |
| MF | 14 | (Colombia) Rafael Carrascal | (substituted off) 88' |
| MF | 10 | (Colombia) Daniel Cataño | (substituted off) 64' |
| FW | 18 | (Colombia) Marco Pérez | (yellow card) 7' |
Substitutes:
| GK | 1 | (Colombia) William Cuesta |
| DF | 4 | (Costa Rica) Juan Pablo Vargas |
| MF | 5 | (Colombia) Larry Vásquez |
| MF | 30 | (Colombia) Yeison Gordillo | (substituted on) 81' | (yellow card) 82' |
| FW | 11 | (Paraguay) Luis Nery Caballero | (substituted on) 88' |
| FW | 19 | (Colombia) Diego Valdés |
| FW | 25 | (Colombia) Maicol Balanta | (substituted on) 64' |
Manager:
(Colombia) Alberto Gamero

| GK | 1 | (Uruguay) Sebastián Viera (c) |
| DF | 20 | (Colombia) Marlon Piedrahita |
| DF | 5 | (Colombia) Rafael Pérez | (yellow card) 20' |
| DF | 21 | (Colombia) Jefferson Gómez |
| DF | 17 | (Colombia) Gabriel Fuentes |
| MF | 15 | (Colombia) Luis Narváez | (substituted off) 83' |
| MF | 24 | (Colombia) Víctor Cantillo |
| MF | 8 | (Colombia) Fredy Hinestroza | (substituted off) 46' |
| MF | 25 | (Argentina) Fabián Sambueza | (substituted off) 61' |
| MF | 10 | (Colombia) Luis Díaz |
| FW | 29 | (Colombia) Teófilo Gutiérrez |
Substitutes:
| GK | 12 | (Colombia) José Luis Chunga |
| DF | 4 | (Colombia) Jesús David Murillo |
| DF | 13 | (Colombia) Willer Ditta |
| MF | 6 | (Colombia) James Sánchez |
| MF | 7 | (Colombia) Sebastián Hernández | (substituted on) 83' |
| MF | 11 | (Colombia) Daniel Moreno | (substituted on) 46' |
| FW | 27 | (Colombia) Luis Carlos Ruiz | (substituted on) 61' |
Manager:
(Colombia) Luis Fernando Suárez

Assistant referees:
Alexander Guzmán
John Gallego
Fourth official:
Andrés Rojas

**Match rules**

- 90 minutes.
- Penalty shoot-out if tied on aggregate.
- Seven named substitutes.
- Maximum of three substitutions.

Tied 2–2 on aggregate, Junior won on penalty kicks.
