= Germán Gutiérrez (footballer) =

Colombian footballer (born 1990)

Personal information
- Full name: Germán Andrés Gutiérrez Henao
- Date of birth: 16 January 1990 (age 36)
- Place of birth: Barranquilla, Colombia
- Height: 1.70 m (5 ft 7 in)
- Position: Left back

Team information
- Current team: Atlético Huila
- Number: 2

Senior career*
Years	Team	Apps	(Gls)
2011–2014	Barranquilla	93	(1)
2014–2019	Atlético Junior	96	(3)
2020	Atlético Bucaramanga	22	(1)
2021–2022	Independiente Medellín	57	(1)
2023	Atlético Junior	0	(0)
2023–	Atlético Huila	18	(1)
- * Club domestic league appearances and goals as of 14 July 2023

Germán Andrés Gutiérrez Henao (born 16 January 1990) is a Colombian footballer who plays as a left back for Categoría Primera A club Atlético Huila.

== Career ==
=== Atlético Bucaramanga ===
On 19 December 2019 it was confirmed, that Gutiérrez had joined Atlético Bucaramanga for the 2020 season.

== Honours ==
=== Club ===
Junior

- Copa Colombia (2): 2015, 2017
