= Jarlan Barrera =

Colombian footballer (born 1995)

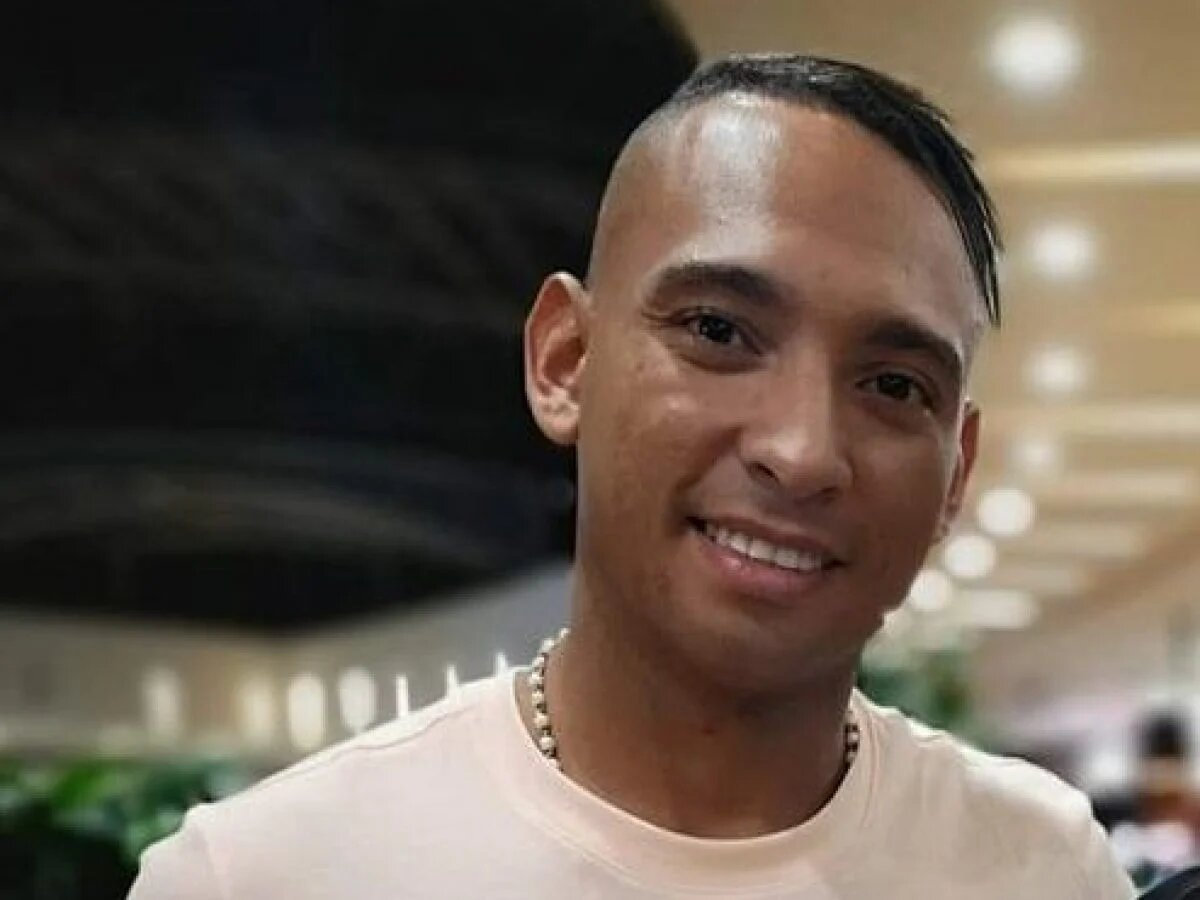
- Jarlan Barrera, 2019

Personal information
- Full name: Jarlan Junior Barrera Escalona
- Date of birth: 16 September 1995 (age 31)
- Place of birth: Santa Marta, Colombia
- Height: 1.72 m (5 ft 8 in)
- Position: Attacking midfielder

Team information
- Current team: Real Cartagena

Youth career
- –2012: Juventud las Américas
- 2012–2013: La Equidad
- 2013: Junior Barranquilla

Senior career*
Years	Team	Apps	(Gls)
2013–2018	Junior Barranquilla	136	(35)
2019	Tigres UANL	0	(0)
2019	→ Rosario Central (loan)	2	(0)
2019–2023	Atlético Nacional	123	(31)
2024–2025	Deportivo Cali	49	(1)
2025–2026	Independiente Medellín	19	(1)
2026–	Real Cartagena	0	(0)

International career
2015	Colombia U20	15	(2)
2016	Colombia Olympic	2	(0)
- * Club domestic league appearances and goals as of 9 March 2026

Jarlan Junior Barrera Escalona (born 16 September 1995) is a Colombian professional footballer who plays as an attacking midfielder for Categoría Primera B club Real Cartagena.

== Club career ==
Born in Santa Marta, Barrera joined Atlético Junior's youth setup in 2013, from La Equidad. He made his first team debut on 7 March 2013, coming on as a second-half substitute for Edwin Cardona in a 6–0 home routing of Valledupar, for the year's Copa Colombia.

Regularly used in the cup matches, Barrera was only promoted to the main squad midway through the 2014 campaign. He made his Categoría Primera A debut on 24 August of that year, replacing Jorge Ortega in a 1–0 away loss against Independiente Medellín.

Barrera scored his first senior goals on 27 August 2014, netting a brace in a 2–0 away defeat of Uniautónoma, for the season's national cup. His first league goal came eight days later, as he scored his team's third in a 4–3 home win against Atlético Huila.

Barrera quickly established himself as a starter for the club in the following years, winning two national cups during the process. On 12 December 2018, in the second leg of the 2018 Copa Sudamericana Finals, he missed a penalty in the stoppage time which would have given his side a 2–1 lead over Athletico Paranaense; Junior lost the tournament in the shoot-outs, with Barrera being substituted off shortly after his missed penalty.

Barrera joined Tigres UANL on 1 January 2019, but only eight days later, he was loaned out to Rosario Central in Argentina. The deal cost Rosario $200.000 and was without an option to buy.

== International career ==
After representing Colombia at under-20 level, Barrera was called up by the full side's manager José Pekerman for a training squad in February 2016. He appeared in two matches with the under-23 team, but was cut out from Carlos Restrepo's final 19-man list ahead of the 2016 Summer Olympics.

== Personal life ==
Barrera is a relative of former footballer Carlos Valderrama.

== Career statistics ==
As of 28 July 2021

Club	Season	League			Cup		Continental		Other		Total	
Club	Season	Division	Apps	Goals	Apps	Goals	Apps	Goals	Apps	Goals	Apps	Goals
Atlético Junior	2013	Categoría Primera A	0	0	5	0	—		—		5	0
Atlético Junior	2014	Categoría Primera A	13	2	11	3	—		—		24	5
Atlético Junior	2015	Categoría Primera A	25	5	8	2	3 (Note: Appearance(s) in Copa Sudamericana)	1	—		36	8
Atlético Junior	2016	Categoría Primera A	26	4	3	1	2	0	—		31	5
Atlético Junior	2017	Categoría Primera A	35	5	9	4	5	0	—		49	9
Atlético Junior	2018	Categoría Primera A	37	7	2	0	11 (Note: Three appearances in Copa Libertadores, eight appearances and one goal in Copa Sudamericana)	1	—		50	8
Atlético Junior	Subtotal		136	23	38	10	21	2	—		195	35
Tigres UANL	2018–19	Liga MX	0	0	—		—		—		0	0
Rosario Central (loan)	2018–19	Primera División	2	0	1	0	1 (Note: Appearance(s) in Copa Libertadores)	0	0	0	4	0
Atlético Nacional	2019	Categoría Primera A	24	3	3	2	4	0	—		31	5
Atlético Nacional	2020	Categoría Primera A	19	3	2	1	9	5	—		30	9
Atlético Nacional	2021	Categoría Primera A	20	7	—		—		—		20	7
Atlético Nacional	Subtotal		63	13	5	3	13	5	—		81	21
Career total			201	36	44	13	35	7	0	0	280	56

== Honours ==
=== Club ===
Atlético Junior

- Copa Colombia: 2015, 2017
- Categoría Primera A: 2018 Finalización
