= Didier Moreno =

Colombian footballer (born 1991)

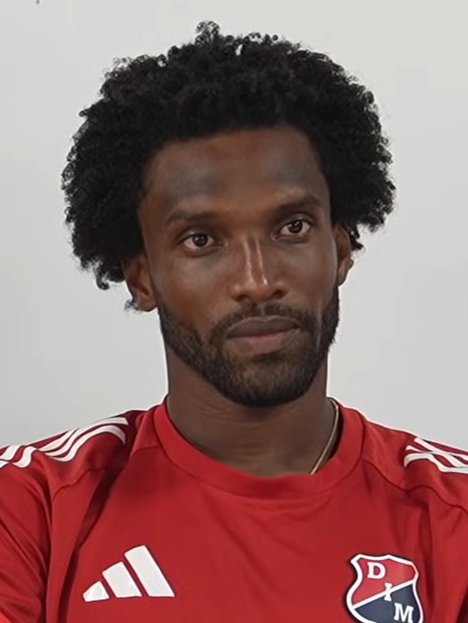

Personal information
- Full name: Didier Andrés Moreno Asprilla
- Date of birth: 15 September 1991 (age 35)
- Place of birth: Bajo Baudó, Colombia
- Height: 1.81 m (5 ft 11 in)
- Position: Defensive midfielder

Team information
- Current team: Junior
- Number: 6

Youth career
- América de Cali

Senior career*
| Years | Team | Apps | (Gls) |
| 2010 | América de Cali | 4 | (0) |
| 2011–2013 | Santa Fe | 25 | (0) |
| 2013–2014 | Atlético Huila | 46 | (2) |
| 2015–2019 | Independiente Medellín | 173 | (4) |
| 2018–2019 | → Deportivo La Coruña (loan) | 21 | (0) |
| 2020– | Junior | 196 | (15) |

International career
| 2011 | Colombia U20 | 5 | (0) |
| 2018 | Colombia | 1 | (0) |
- * Club domestic league appearances and goals as of 15 May 2025

Didier Andrés Moreno Asprilla (born 15 September 1991) is a Colombian footballer who plays for Atlético Junior as a defensive midfielder.

== Club career ==
Moreno was born in Bajo Baudó, Chocó Department, but moved to Bogotá at an early age. He started his career with América de Cali, graduating from the club's youth setup and making his debut with the first team during the 2010 season.

In 2011, Moreno moved to fellow Categoría Primera A side Independiente Santa Fe, but only featured rarely for the club during his spell at the club. On 30 July 2013, he joined Atlético Huila still in the top tier. He immediately became a regular starter and scored his first professional goal on August 19 in a 2–1 loss at Patriotas Boyacá.

On 30 December 2014, Moreno agreed to a contract with Independiente Medellín. An immediate first-choice, he won the 2016 Torneo Apertura with the club.

On 16 August 2018, Moreno moved abroad for the first time in his career, after signing a one-year loan deal with Spanish Segunda División club Deportivo de La Coruña.

== Honours ==
=== Club ===
Santa Fe

- Categoría Primera A (1): 2012 Apertura
- Superliga Colombiana (1): 2013

Independiente Medellín

- Categoría Primera A (1): 2016 Apertura

Junior

- Categoría Primera A: (1): 2023 Finalización
- Superliga Colombiana (1): 2020

=== International ===
- Toulon Tournament : 2011 Toulon Tournament
