= Jersson González (footballer, born 2001) =

Colombian footballer (born 2001)

Personal information
- Full name: Jersson David González Niño
- Date of birth: 15 September 2001 (age 25)
- Place of birth: Bogotá, Colombia
- Height: 1.72 m (5 ft 8 in)
- Positions: Midfielder; winger

Team information
- Current team: Orenburg
- Number: 7

Youth career
- Santa Fe

Senior career*
Years	Team	Apps	(Gls)
2020–	Santa Fe	72	(11)
2024	→ Independiente Medellín (loan)	19	(0)
2025–2026	→ Tolima (loan)	44	(9)
2026–	→ Orenburg (loan)	3	(0)

International career^{‡}
2023	Colombia U23	2	(0)
- * Club domestic league appearances and goals as of 8 November 2026 ‡ National team caps and goals as of 17 October 2023

Jersson David González Niño (born 15 September 2001) is a Colombian professional footballer who plays as a midfielder or winger for Russian club Orenburg on loan from Santa Fe.

== Early life ==
González was born on 15 September 2001 in Bogotá, Colombia. Growing up, he commuted from the south of Bogotá to the north of the city for football training sessions.

== Club career ==
González joined the youth academy of Colombian side Santa Fe and was promoted to the club's senior team in 2020, where he was regarded as a fan favorite. He established himself as a regular starter while playing for the club and helped them win the 2021 Superliga Colombiana. On 11 May 2022, he collapsed on the field because of a heart condition during a 0–1 home loss to Junior in the Copa Colombia.

During the summer of 2024, he was sent on loan to Colombian side DIM, where he made 19 league appearances and scored zero goals. Following his stint there, he was sent on loan to Colombian side Tolima in 2025, where he made 45 league appearances and scored eight goals. While playing for the club, he adapted to Colombian manager Lucas González's possession-based style, where he was given increased freedom to interchange positions. Ahead of the 2026–27 season, he was sent on loan to Russian side Orenburg.

== International career ==
González is a Colombia youth international and represented Colombia internationally at under-23 level. Previously, he was called up to the Colombia national under-20 football team in 2020.

On 14 October 2023, he debuted for the Colombia national under-23 football team during a 2–2 away friendly draw with the Costa Rica national under-23 football team. The same year, he played for the Colombia national under-23 football team at the 2023 Pan American Games.

== Style of play ==
González plays as a midfielder or winger and is right-footed. Colombian newspaper El Colombiano wrote in 2024 that he "is a fast, skillful footballer. His slender build helps him run, and his strong legs allow him to shoot on goal or cross the ball".

== Personal life ==
González has a brother. While recovering from his heart condition in 2022, Tatiana Arce helped him recover. After that, he married her and had a daughter with her.

== Career statistics ==
As of 8 November 2026

Club	Season	League			Cup		Continental		Other		Total	
Club	Season	Division	Apps	Goals	Apps	Goals	Apps	Goals	Apps	Goals	Apps	Goals
Santa Fe	2020	Liga DIMAYOR	4	1	1	0	—		1 (Note: Appearances in the Liga DIMAYOR knockout stage)	0	6	1
Santa Fe	2021	Liga DIMAYOR	21	2	2	0	4 (Note: Appearances in Copa Libertadores)	1	3 (Note: Two appearances in the Liga DIMAYOR knockout stage, one appearance in Superliga Colombiana)	0	30	3
Santa Fe	2022	Liga DIMAYOR	9	2	3	1	—		0	0	12	3
Santa Fe	2023	Liga DIMAYOR	24	4	1	1	4 (Note: Appearances in Copa Sudamericana)	0	—		29	5
Santa Fe	2024	Liga DIMAYOR	14	2	3	1	—		5	0	22	3
Santa Fe	Total		72	11	10	3	8	1	9	0	99	15
Independiente Medellín (loan)	2024	Liga DIMAYOR	19	0	4	0	0	0	—		23	0
Tolima (loan)	2025	Liga DIMAYOR	28	7	0	0	0	0	14	0	42	7
Tolima (loan)	2026	Liga DIMAYOR	16	2	—		10	2	3	1	29	5
Tolima (loan)	Total		44	9	0	0	10	2	17	1	71	12
Orenburg (loan)	2026–27	Russian Premier League	3	0	3	0	—		—		6	0
Career total			138	20	17	3	18	3	26	1	199	27

== Honours ==
Santa Fe

- Superliga Colombiana: 2021
