= Yony González =

Colombian footballer (born 1994)

Personal information
- Full name: Yony Alexander González Copete
- Date of birth: 11 July 1994 (age 32)
- Place of birth: Medellín, Colombia
- Height: 1.84 m (6 ft 0 in)
- Position: Forward

Team information
- Current team: Independiente Medellín

Youth career
- Envigado

Senior career*
Years	Team	Apps	(Gls)
2013–2016	Envigado	78	(10)
2016–2018	Atlético Junior	58	(10)
2019	Fluminense	47	(13)
2020–2023	Benfica	0	(0)
2020	→ Corinthians (loan)	4	(0)
2020	→ LA Galaxy (loan)	9	(0)
2021	→ Ceará (loan)	14	(2)
2022	→ Deportivo Cali (loan)	25	(2)
2023	Portimonense	16	(0)
2023–2024	Fluminense	19	(1)
2024	→ Atlético Goianiense (loan)	13	(0)
2024	→ Paysandu (loan)	7	(0)
2025	Águilas Doradas	32	(10)
2026–	Independiente Medellín	6	(0)

International career^{‡}
2015–2016	Colombia U23	3	(0)
- * Club domestic league appearances and goals as of 17 April 2026 ‡ National team caps and goals as of 28 February 2016

Yony Alexander González Copete (born 11 July 1994) is a Colombian professional footballer who plays as a forward for Independiente Medellín.

== Career ==
=== Atlético Junior ===
In January 2016, González joined Atlético Junior. In November 2017, he played in both legs of the Copa Águila final, beating Independiente Medellín 3–1 on aggregate. On 5 December 2018, he scored the equalizer in the first leg of the Copa Sudamericana final against Athletico Paranaense. On 12 December 2018, he played in the second league of the final, where his team drew 1–1 and lost 4–3 in a penalty shootout, against the Brazilian side. On 16 December 2018, he scored Junior's sole goal in the second leg of the final, and beat Independiente Medellín 5–4 on aggregate.

=== Fluminense ===
On 27 December 2018 Gonzalez signed with Fluminense as his contract with Atlético Junior was about to expire. On 8 January 2019 he was officially presented by Fluminense.

=== Benfica ===
On 10 January 2020, González signed with the Portuguese club Benfica on a contract that extends until 2024. He terminated his contract with the club by mutual agreement on 31 January 2023.

==== Corinthians (loan) ====
On 11 February 2020, González returned to Brazil joining Corinthians on a six-month loan, with an option to buy after playing five games. After a poor spell at the club and not having reached the game quota to make the move permanent, González returned to Benfica.

==== LA Galaxy (loan) ====
On 19 August 2020, González was loaned to MLS side LA Galaxy for the remainder of their 2020 season.

==== Ceará (loan) ====
On 23 February 2021, González returned to Brazil on a loan deal until December 2021, to play in Série A club Ceará.

==== Deportivo Cali (loan) ====
On 6 February 2022, was loaned to Categoría Primera A side Deportivo Cali for the remainder of their 2022 season.

=== Portimonense ===
On 1 February 2023, González joined Portimonense on a contract until the end of the season with an option for an additional year.

=== Return to Fluminense ===
On 6 July 2023. González returned to Fluminense, joining the club on a free transfer and signing a contract until the end of 2024.

== Career statistics ==
=== Club ===
As of 1 March 2024

Appearances and goals by club, season and competition
Club	Season	League			Cup		Continental		State League		Other		Total	
Club	Season	Division	Apps	Goals	Apps	Goals	Apps	Goals	Apps	Goals	Apps	Goals	Apps	Goals
Envigado	2013	Primera A	12	0	9	0	—		—		—		21	0
Envigado	2014	Primera A	21	1	5	1	—		—		—		26	2
Envigado	2015	Primera A	34	9	2	0	—		—		—		36	9
Envigado	Total		78	10	16	1	—		—		—		83	11
Atlético Junior	2016	Primera A	22	1	6	0	5 (Note: Appearance(s) in Copa Sudamericana)	1	—		—		28	2
Atlético Junior	2017	Primera A	5	1	5	0	5	2	—		—		12	3
Atlético Junior	2018	Primera A	31	8	14	1	17 (Note: Eight appearances and one goal in Copa Libertadores, nine appearances and one goal in Copa Sudamericana)	2	—		—		51	11
Atlético Junior	Total		58	10	25	1	27	5	—		—		89	16
Fluminense	2019	Série A	34	6	7	1	8	3	13 (Note: Appearance(s) in Campeonato Carioca)	7	—		62	14
Corinthians (loan)	2020	Série A	0	0	0	0	0	0	4 (Note: Appearance(s) in Campeonato Paulista)	0	—		4	0
LA Galaxy (loan)	2020	MLS	9	0	0	0	—		—		0	0	9	0
Ceará (loan)	2021	Série A	14	2	1	0	6	0	3 (Note: Appearance(s) in Campeonato Cearense)	0	4 (Note: Appearance(s) in Copa do Nordeste)	0	28	2
Deportivo Cali (loan)	2022	Primera A	25	2	1	0	5 (Note: Three appearances in Copa Libertadores, two appearances in Copa Sudamericana)	0	—		1 (Note: Appearance(s) in Superliga Colombiana)	0	32	2
Portimonense	2022–23	Primeira Liga	16	0	0	0	0	0	—		—		16	0
Fluminense	2023	Série A	18	1	0	0	3 (Note: Appearance(s) in Copa Libertadores)	0	—		0	0	21	1
Fluminense	2024	Série A	0	0	0	0	0	0	1	0	0	0	1	0
Fluminense	Total		18	1	0	0	3	0	1	0	0	0	22	1
Atlético Goianiense	2024	Série A	0	0	0	0	—		0	0	—		0	0
Career total			252	31	50	3	49	8	21	7	5	0	377	49

== Honours ==
Atlético Junior

- Categoría Primera A: 2018-II
- Copa Colombia: 2017
- Copa Sudamericana runner-up: 2018

Fluminense

- Copa Libertadores: 2023
