= Luis Miranda (footballer) =

Colombian footballer (born 1997)

Personal information
- Full name: Luis Fernando Miranda Molinares
- Date of birth: 27 August 1997 (age 29)
- Place of birth: Maicao, Colombia
- Height: 1.78 m (5 ft 10 in)
- Position: Right winger

Team information
- Current team: Llaneros
- Number: 7

Senior career*
Years	Team	Apps	(Gls)
2015–2016	Expreso Rojo		
2017–2019	Cúcuta Deportivo	78	(13)
2020–2025	Deportes Tolima	125	(11)
2023	→ Once Caldas (loan)	27	(1)
2025–	Llaneros	18	(1)

International career
2019	Colombia U23	1	(0)
- * Club domestic league appearances and goals as of 12 December 2025

Luis Fernando Miranda Molinares (born 27 August 1997) is a Colombian footballer who plays as a right winger for Categoría Primera A side Llaneros.

== Club career ==
=== Cúcuta Deportivo ===
Getting his debut in the Categoría Primera B for Expreso Rojo in the 2015 season where he made 9 appearances during the year, Miranda joined Cúcuta Deportivo ahead of the 2017 season. He got his debut for the club on 5 March 2017 against Atlético FC, where he was in the line up, before getting replaced in the 64th minute. Miranda got his breakthrough in the 2018 season and became an important player for Cúcuta Deportivo.

=== Deportes Tolima ===
On 24 December 2019, Deportes Tolima confirmed the signing of Miranda. After three seasons at the club, Miranda joined Once Caldas on a one-year loan deal.

== International career ==
His performances for Cúcuta Deportivo in the 2019 season earned him a call-up from the Colombia Olympic football team in November 2019. He got his debut on 17 November 2019 when he came off the bench to play the last 22 minutes against Japan U23.

== Honours ==
Cúcuta Deportivo

- Categoría Primera B: 2018

Deportes Tolima

- Categoría Primera A: 2021–I
- Superliga Colombiana: 2022
