= Sebastián Pedroza =

Colombian footballer (born 1999)

Personal information
- Full name: Juan Sebastián Pedroza Perdomo
- Date of birth: 8 April 1999 (age 27)
- Place of birth: Melgar, Colombia
- Height: 1.76 m (5 ft 9 in)
- Position: Defensive midfielder

Youth career
- –2018: Independiente Santa Fe

Senior career*
Years	Team	Apps	(Gls)
2019–2024	Independiente Santa Fe	69	(2)
2022–2023	→ Al-Batin (loan)	17	(0)
2023–2024	→ Al-Okhdood (loan)	26	(1)
2024–2026	Al-Okhdood	61	(4)
- * Club domestic league appearances and goals as of 16 May 2026

Juan Sebastián Pedroza Perdomo (born 8 April 1999) is a Colombian professional footballer who plays as a defensive midfielder.

== Career ==
On 23 July 2022, Pedroza joined Saudi Arabian club Al-Batin on a year-long loan from Santa Fe.

On 7 June 2023, Pedroza joined Al-Okhdood on a season-long loan. On 13 August 2024, Pedroza joined Al-Okhdood on a two-year contract.

== Career statistics ==
=== Club ===
As of 16 May 2026

Appearances and goals by club, season and competition
Club	Season	League			National cup (Note: Includes Copa Colombia, King's Cup)		Continental		Other		Total	
Club	Season	Division	Apps	Goals	Apps	Goals	Apps	Goals	Apps	Goals	Apps	Goals
Independiente Santa Fe	2019	Categoría Primera A	15	0	5	0	—		—		20	0
Independiente Santa Fe	2020	Categoría Primera A	11	0	3	1	—		—		14	1
Independiente Santa Fe	2021	Categoría Primera A	23	1	4	0	1 (Note: Appearance in Copa Libertadores)	0	2 (Note: Appearances in Superliga Colombiana)	1	30	2
Independiente Santa Fe	2022	Categoría Primera A	20	1	3	0	—		—		23	1
Independiente Santa Fe	Total		69	2	15	1	1	0	2	1	87	4
Al-Batin (loan)	2022–23	Saudi Pro League	17	0	1	0	—		—		18	0
Al-Okhdood (loan)	2023–24	Saudi Pro League	26	1	0	0	—		—		26	1
Al-Okhdood	2024–25	Saudi Pro League	31	1	1	0	—		—		32	1
Al-Okhdood	2025–26	Saudi Pro League	30	3	2	0	—		—		32	3
Al-Okhdood	Total		87	5	3	0	—		—		90	5
Career Total			173	7	19	1	1	0	2	1	195	9

== Honours ==
Independiente Santa Fe

- Superliga Colombiana: 2021
