= Jefferson Gómez =

Colombian footballer (born 1996)

Personal information
- Full name: Jeferson José Gómez Genes
- Date of birth: 22 June 1996 (age 30)
- Place of birth: Barranquilla, Colombia
- Height: 1.83 m (6 ft 0 in)
- Position: Centre back

Team information
- Current team: Junior
- Number: 21

Senior career*
Years	Team	Apps	(Gls)
2014–2017	Envigado	74	(1)
2017–2021	Junior	30	(2)
- * Club domestic league appearances and goals as of 17 February 2019 (UTC)

Jeferson José Gómez Genes (born 22 June 1996) is a Colombian professional footballer who plays as a centre back for Junior.

== Honours ==
=== Club ===
Junior

- Categoría Primera A: 2018-II
- Copa Colombia: 2017
- Superliga Colombiana: 2019
