= Juan Camilo Angulo =

Colombian footballer (born 1988)

Personal information
- Full name: Juan Camilo Angulo Villegas
- Date of birth: September 26, 1988 (age 38)
- Place of birth: Florida, Colombia
- Height: 1.78 m (5 ft 10 in)
- Position: Full back

Team information
- Current team: Deportivo Cali

Youth career
- 2002–2006: América de Cali

Senior career*
Years	Team	Apps	(Gls)
2007–2010	América de Cali	46	(4)
2010	→ Tigre (loan)	0	(0)
2011	Shanghai Shenhua	25	(1)
2012–2014	Cúcuta Deportivo	38	(3)
2013	→ Bahia (loan)	4	(0)
2015	Independiente Medellín	13	(0)
2016–2018	América de Cali	88	(7)
2018–	Deportivo Cali	0	(0)
- * Club domestic league appearances and goals as of 14 June 2018

Juan Camilo Angulo Villegas (Spanish pronunciation: [xwaŋ kaˈmilo aŋˈɡulo]; (Note: In isolation, Juan is pronounced [xwan].) born September 26, 1988) is a Colombian exfootballer who currently plays as a full back for Inter de Palmira in the Categoría Primera B

== Career ==
Angulo started his career with Colombian Categoría Primera A side América de Cali after being promoted from their youth team in the 2007 league season. The Head coach of the club Diego Edison Umaña would give Angulo his first league appearance on 18 May 2008 against Boyacá Chicó where the team lost 3–2 away in the Estadio La Independencia stadium. As the season progressed Angulo would gradually start to establish himself within the team and was part of the squad that won the 2008 Finalizacion at the end of the season. The following season Angulo would play in his first international competition, in the 2009 Copa Libertadores where he made his début against Defensor Sporting on 10 February 2009 in a 1–0 away defeat. Throughout the tournament he would play in five games before the club were knocked-out in the group stages.

After having played in 46 games for América de Cali, Angulo would attract interests from foreign teams and he would transfer to Argentine Primera División club Tigre for the 2010-11 season. His time at the club was marred by controversy when he accused the Head coach of the club Ricardo Caruso Lombardi of asking for a bribe to select him in the team. Lombardi denied any truth to these accusations, however the club decided to relieve him of his duties along with not renewing Angulo's short-term contract.

It was confirmed on 17 January 2011 that Angulo joined Chinese Super League club Shanghai Shenhua. He would go on to make his début for the club in a league game against Qingdao Jonoon F.C. on 1 April 2011 in a 3–3 draw. This was followed by his first goal for the club on 23 April 2011 against Henan Jianye F.C. in a 2–1 away victory. When the season ended Angulo returned to Colombia to join top-tier side Cúcuta Deportivo and made his first appearance for them in a league game against Envigado F.C. on 28 July 2012 in a 2–1 victory. His first goal for the club was scored against Independiente Medellín in a league game on 28 October 2012 in a 1–1 draw. In the 2013 league season Angulo was loaned out to Brazilian club Esporte Clube Bahia, when he returned to Cúcuta Deportivo they were relegated to the second division. He would stay with them for the following season before he left to join Independiente Medellin and then later a return to his original club of América de Cali. After two years at América de Cali, he joined crosstown rivals Deportivo Cali for the second half of the 2018 season.

== Honours ==
América de Cali

- Categoría Primera A (1):2008 Finalización
- Categoría Primera B (1):2016

Deportivo Cali

- Categoría Primera A (1): 2021-II

Tolima

- Superliga Colombiana (1): 2022
