= Juan Pablo Segovia =

Argentine footballer

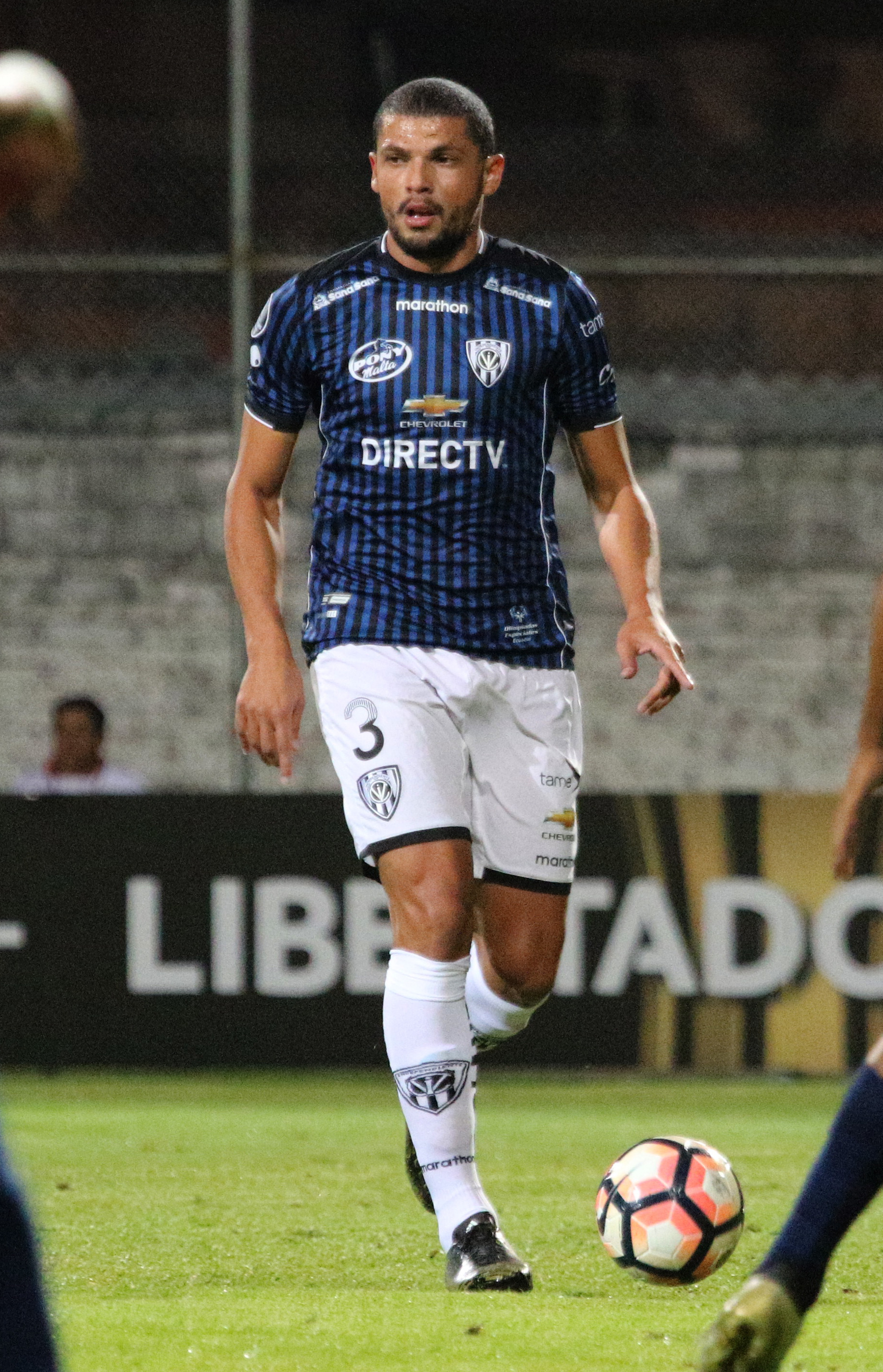
- Segovia with Independiente del Valle in 2017

Personal information
- Full name: Juan Pablo Segovia González
- Date of birth: 21 March 1989 (age 37)
- Place of birth: Corrientes, Argentina
- Height: 1.85 m (6 ft 1 in)
- Position: Defender

Team information
- Current team: Defensores de Belgrano

Youth career
- Lanús

Senior career*
Years	Team	Apps	(Gls)
2007–2009	Lanús	0	(0)
2009–2013	Atlanta	135	(8)
2013–2015	Los Andes	88	(7)
2016–2017	Deportivo Cuenca	43	(6)
2017–2018	Independiente Valle	75	(3)
2019–2020	América de Cali	62	(2)
2021–2022	Puebla	54	(3)
2022–2023	Necaxa	28	(0)
2023	Montevideo City Torque	6	(0)
2024	Temperley	31	(0)
2025–	Defensores de Belgrano	9	(0)
- * Club domestic league appearances and goals as of 17:48, 25 July 2025 (UTC)

Juan Pablo Segovia (born 21 March 1989) is an Argentine professional footballer who plays as a defender for Defensores de Belgrano.

== Honours ==
Lanús

- Torneo Apertura: 2007-08
