= Carlos Ibargüen =

Colombian footballer

Personal information
- Full name: Carlos Alberto Ibargüen Hinojosa
- Date of birth: 7 October 1995 (age 31)
- Place of birth: Buenaventura, Colombia
- Height: 1.80 m (5 ft 11 in)
- Position: Forward

Senior career*
Years	Team	Apps	(Gls)
2013–2015	Cortuluá	74	(23)
2016–2020	Tigres	0	(0)
2016	→ Santa Fe (loan)	10	(3)
2016–2017	→ Medellín (loan)	5	(2)
2017	→ Cortuluá (loan)	10	(1)
2018	→ Juárez (loan)	6	(0)
2018	→ Correcaminos UAT (loan)	7	(0)
2019	→ La Equidad (loan)	7	(0)
2019	→ Atlético Bucaramanga (loan)	12	(0)
2020	→ Cortuluá (loan)	4	(1)
2020	Sereď	1	(0)
2021	Técnico Universitario	2	(0)
2022	Ħamrun Spartans	1	(0)
2024	Club de Lyon		

International career
2015	Colombia U20	2	(0)
- * Club domestic league appearances and goals

Carlos Alberto Ibargüen Hinojosa (born 7 October 1995) is a Colombian professional footballer who plays as a forward. He was part of the Colombian squad at the 2015 FIFA U-20 World Cup.
