= Eder Chaux =

Colombian footballer (born 1991)

Personal information
- Full name: Eder Aleixo Chaux Ospina
- Date of birth: December 20, 1991 (age 34)
- Place of birth: Ibagué, Colombia
- Height: 1.89 m (6 ft 2 in)
- Position: Goalkeeper

Team information
- Current team: Independiente Medellín
- Number: 25

Youth career
- Deportes Tolima

Senior career*
Years	Team	Apps	(Gls)
2014–2016	Boyacá Chicó	27	(0)
2016–2017	Alianza Petrolera	0	(0)
2018–2019	Real Estelí	20	(0)
2019	Patriotas	35	(0)
2020–2021	América de Cali	16	(0)
2021–2022	Atlético Junior	4	(0)
2022–2023	Once Caldas	56	(0)
2024–	Independiente Medellín	47	(0)
- * Club domestic league appearances and goals as of 11 December 2025 ‡ National team caps and goals as of 20.09.2022

Eder Chaux (born 20 December 1991) is a Colombian association footballer. Chaux plays as a goalkeeper for Independiente Medellín in the Colombian Categoría Primera A.

== International career ==
Chaux was named in the provisional Colombia squad for the 2019 Copa America.
