= Ronaldo Dinolis =

Panamanian footballer (born 1994)

Personal information
- Full name: Ronaldo Antonio Dinolis Rodríguez
- Date of birth: 17 November 1994 (age 32)
- Place of birth: Colón, Panama
- Height: 1.70 m (5 ft 7 in)
- Position: Forward

Team information
- Current team: Santa Fe

Senior career*
Years	Team	Apps	(Gls)
2017–2018	San Miguelito	49	(16)
2018	Santos de Guápiles	17	(4)
2019	Universitario	20	(9)
2019	Real España	9	(2)
2020	Plaza Amador	1	(0)
2020	San Miguelito	7	(1)
2021	Plaza Amador	16	(6)
2021–	Santa Fe	13	(3)

International career
2017	Panama	1	(2)
- * Club domestic league appearances and goals

Ronaldo Antonio Dinolis Rodríguez (born 17 November 1994) is a Panamanian footballer in the position of striker, currently playing for Santa Fe.

== Club career ==
Dinolis began his football career in the second-division Panama club New York FC. In January 2017 he moved to the first-league Sporting San Miguelito . In Panameña League he made his debut on 14 January 2017 in a 3-0 defeat against Tauro, while the first goal in the top division was scored on 8 February in the same year in a 3-1 win against Atlético Veragüense . He immediately won a place in the starting lineup and quickly became the top scorer in the competition. In the autumn season Apertura 2017 was chosen in the official LPF plebiscite to the best eleven of the Panama league. He spent no more than a year and a half in Sporting, after which in June 2018 he moved to the Costa Rica team Santos de Guápiles.

== International career ==
Dinolis made his national team debut on 24 October 2017, scoring a brace in their 5–0 friendly win against Grenada.
