= Carlos Hernández (footballer, born 1996) =

Colombian footballer

Carlos Rodríguez
Personal information
- Full name: Carlos Andrés Rodríguez Hernández
- Date of birth: 2 June 1996 (age 30)
- Place of birth: Colombia
- Position: Midfielder

Team information
- Current team: Patriotas

Senior career*
Years	Team	Apps	(Gls)
2016–	Patriotas	29	(0)
- * Club domestic league appearances and goals as of 19:57, 22 May 2018 (UTC)

Carlos Andrés Rodríguez Hernández (born 2 June 1996) is a Colombian professional footballer who plays as a midfielder for Categoría Primera A side Patriotas.

== Career ==
Rodríguez was moved into Categoría Primera A side Patriotas' senior squad in 2016, at the beginning of the 2016 campaign. On 2 April, Rodríguez made his professional debut during a loss away to Santa Fe. In his third appearance in all competitions, he scored the first two goals of his career in a 3–3 Copa Colombia tie against Boyacá Chicó. After two seasons with the first-team, Rodríguez featured forty-two times and netted seven goals; all of which came in Copa Colombia matches.

== Career statistics ==
As of 22 May 2018.

Club statistics
Club	Season	League			Cup (Note: Includes the Copa Colombia)		League Cup		Continental (Note: Includes the Copa Sudamericana)		Other		Total	
Club	Season	Division	Apps	Goals	Apps	Goals	Apps	Goals	Apps	Goals	Apps	Goals	Apps	Goals
Patriotas	2016	Categoría Primera A	15	0	4	3	—		—		0	0	19	3
Patriotas	2017	Categoría Primera A	14	0	8	4	—		1 (Note: One appearance in 2017 Copa Sudamericana)	0	0	0	23	4
Patriotas	2018	Categoría Primera A	0	0	0	0	—		—		0	0	0	0
Career total			29	0	12	7	—		1	0	0	0	42	7
