= José Ortíz (footballer, born 1998) =

Colombian footballer

José Ortiz
Personal information
- Full name: José Enrique Ortiz Cortés
- Date of birth: 16 November 1998 (age 27)
- Place of birth: Tumaco, Colombia
- Height: 1.81 m (5 ft 11 in)
- Position: Centre-back

Team information
- Current team: Independiente Medellín
- Number: 24

Senior career*
Years	Team	Apps	(Gls)
2017–2019	Deportivo Pasto	45	(0)
2019–2020	Monarcas Morelia	15	(1)
2020–2021	Mazatlán	29	(0)
2021–2022	Santa Fe	33	(2)
2022–2023	Atlético Junior	29	(0)
2023–	Independiente Medellín	82	(4)
- * Club domestic league appearances and goals as of 11 December 2025

José Enrique Ortiz Cortés (born 16 November 1998) is a Colombian professional footballer who plays as a defender for Colombian club Independiente Medellín.
