= Andrés Balanta =

Colombian footballer (2000–2022)

- Balanta in 2022 with Atlético Tucumán

Personal information
- Full name: Andrés Felipe Balanta Cifuentes
- Date of birth: 18 January 2000
- Place of birth: Cali, Colombia
- Date of death: 29 November 2022 (aged 22)
- Place of death: San Miguel de Tucumán, Argentina
- Height: 1.78 m (5 ft 10 in)
- Position: Defensive midfielder

Youth career
- Deportivo Cali

Senior career*
Years	Team	Apps	(Gls)
2018–2022	Deportivo Cali	96	(4)
2022	→ Atlético Tucumán (loan)	7	(0)
Total		103	(4)

International career
2017	Colombia U17	13	(0)
2019	Colombia U20	11	(0)
2020	Colombia U23	3	(0)
- * Club domestic league appearances and goals

Andrés Felipe Balanta Cifuentes (18 January 2000 – 29 November 2022) was a Colombian professional footballer who played as defensive midfielder for Deportivo Cali and Atlético Tucumán. He represented his nation at the youth level. In June 2022, he joined Atlético Tucumán on loan from Deportivo Cali until June 2023 with a purchase option at the express request of the technical director Lucas Pusineri, this being his first international experience.

On 29 November 2022, during training, Balanta collapsed to the ground from cardiorespiratory arrest. Medical personnel unsuccessfully attempted resuscitation for 40 minutes.

== See also ==
- List of association footballers who died while playing
