= Leonardo Pico =

Colombian footballer (born 1991)

Personal information
- Full name: Rubén Leonardo Pico Carvajal
- Date of birth: 4 September 1991 (age 35)
- Place of birth: El Cocuy, Colombia
- Height: 1.80 m (5 ft 11 in)
- Position: Defensive midfielder

Team information
- Current team: Fortaleza
- Number: 14

Youth career
- Patriotas

Senior career*
Years	Team	Apps	(Gls)
2011–2016	Patriotas	132	(2)
2016	Santa Fe	7	(0)
2017	→ Junior (loan)	25	(1)
2018–2020	Junior	50	(2)
2022–2023	Once Caldas	24	(0)
2023–	Fortaleza	85	(0)
- * Club domestic league appearances and goals as of 11 December 2025

Rubén Leonardo Pico Carvajal (born 4 September 1991) is a Colombian professional footballer who plays as a defensive midfielder for Fortaleza.

== Honours ==
=== Club ===
Patriotas

- Primera B (1): 2011

Santa Fe

- Primera A (1): 2016–II
- Suruga Bank Championship (1): 2016

Junior

- Primera A (1): 2018–II
- Copa Colombia (1): 2017

=== Records ===
- Patriotas Record Appearance Maker: 162 games
