= Kevin Velasco =

Colombian footballer

Personal information
- Full name: Kevin Andrés Velasco Bonilla
- Date of birth: 30 April 1997 (age 29)
- Place of birth: Cali, Colombia
- Height: 1.68 m (5 ft 6 in)
- Position: Winger

Team information
- Current team: Puebla
- Number: 26

Youth career
- Deportivo Cali

Senior career*
| Years | Team | Apps | (Gls) |
| 2017 | Cúcuta | 4 | (0) |
| 2017–2018 | Atlético FC | 24 | (7) |
| 2018–2024 | Deportivo Cali | 154 | (20) |
| 2023–2024 | → Puebla (loan) | 35 | (2) |
| 2024– | Puebla | 26 | (1) |
| 2025 | → Athletico Paranaense (loan) | 21 | (1) |

International career^{‡}
| 2022– | Colombia | 1 | (0) |
- * Club domestic league appearances and goals as of 15 December 2025 ‡ National team caps and goals as of 5 June 2022

Kevin Andrés Velasco Bonilla (born 30 April 1997) is a Colombian professional footballer who plays as a winger for Liga MX club Puebla.

== Club career ==
=== Early career ===
Velasco started his youth career with Deportivo Cali but, after being promoted to the first team in January 2017, he received few opportunities. He left to join Cúcuta Deportivo in the Categoría Primera B.

=== Cúcuta Deportivo ===
He made his professional debut for Cúcuta Deportivo on 14 February 2017.

=== Atlético FC ===
Velasco was transferred to Atlético FC, staying in the Categoría Primera B.

=== Deportivo Cali ===
After returning to Deportivo Cali, he struggled to break into the first team under the management of Gerardo Pelusso. After Pelusso's sacking in 2018, he started to play more often under new manager Lucas Pusineri.

By 2021, Velasco was a key part of the Rafael Dudamel’s team as they won the Torneo Finalización competition, defeating Deportes Tolima in the final.

=== Club Puebla ===
On 21 May 2023, Deportivo Cali announced that they had reached an agreement with Liga MX club Puebla for a loan with an option to buy.

== International career ==
On 24 May 2022, interim coach Héctor Cárdenas called up Velasco to the Colombian national football team. He made his international debut on 5 June in a 1–0 victory against Saudi Arabia.

== Honours ==
Deportivo Cali

- Categoría Primera A: 2021 Finalización
