= David Murillo =

Colombian footballer (born 1993)

Personal information
- Full name: Jesús David Murillo León
- Date of birth: 17 August 1993 (age 33)
- Place of birth: Cali, Colombia
- Height: 1.73 m (5 ft 8 in)
- Position: Right back

Team information
- Current team: Unión Magdalena
- Number: 4

Senior career*
Years	Team	Apps	(Gls)
2013—2014	Patriotas Boyacá	19	(0)
2015	Barranquilla	14	(0)
2015—2020	Atlético Junior	123	(14)
2021–2022	Once Caldas	59	(0)
2023	Deportivo Pereira	10	(0)
2024	Boyacá Chicó	9	(0)
2024–	Unión Magdalena	29	(0)
- * Club domestic league appearances and goals as of 12 December 2025

Jesús David Murillo León (born 17 August 1993) is a Colombian footballer who plays as a right back for Unión Magdalena in the Categoría Primera A.

== Honours ==
=== Club ===
Junior

- Categoría Primera A (2): 2018-II, 2019-I
- Copa Colombia (2): 2015, 2017
- Superliga Colombiana (1) : 2020
