= Humberto Acevedo =

Colombian footballer (born 1997)

Personal information
- Full name: Humberto José Acevedo Serrano
- Date of birth: 23 May 1997 (age 29)
- Place of birth: Santa Marta, Colombia
- Height: 1.85 m (6 ft 1 in)
- Position: Goalkeeper

Team information
- Current team: Deportivo Cali

Youth career
- Deportivo Cali

Senior career*
Years	Team	Apps	(Gls)
2017–2024	Deportivo Cali	30	(0)
2019–2020	→ Tauro	16	(0)
2023	→ Libertad	6	(0)
- * Club domestic league appearances and goals as of 1 June 2024

Humberto José Acevedo Serrano (born 23 May 1997) is a Colombian professional footballer who plays as a goalkeeper.

== Career ==
On 22 July 2024, Acevedo Colombia and made an Aliyah to Israel.

== Honours ==
Tauro

- Liga Panameña de Fútbol: 2018 Apertura

Deportivo Cali

- Categoría Primera A: 2021
