= Jesús Rodríguez (Colombian footballer) =

Colombian footballer (born 1993)

Personal information
- Full name: Jesús Manuel Rodríguez Escorcia
- Date of birth: 27 October 1993 (age 33)
- Place of birth: Palmar de Varela, Colombia
- Height: 1.78 m (5 ft 10 in)
- Position: Forward

Team information
- Current team: Atlético (on loan from Junior)

Senior career*
Years	Team	Apps	(Gls)
2013	Junior		
2014–2015	Barranquilla	45	(10)
2016–	Junior	8	(0)
2017	→ Llaneros (loan)	8	(1)
2017–	→ Atlético (loan)	8	(1)
- * Club domestic league appearances and goals as of 20 May 2018 (UTC)

Jesús Manuel Rodríguez Escorcia (born 27 October 1993), known as Jesús Rodríguez (Latin American Spanish: [xeˈsus roˈðɾiɣes]), is a Colombian footballer who plays as a forward for Categoría Primera B club Atlético on loan from Junior.
