= William Cuesta =

Colombian footballer (born 1993)

Personal information
- Full name: William David Cuesta Mosquera
- Date of birth: February 19, 1993 (age 33)
- Place of birth: Vigía del Fuerte, Colombia
- Height: 1.95 m (6 ft 5 in)
- Position: Goalkeeper

Team information
- Current team: Deportes Tolima
- Number: 1

Senior career*
Years	Team	Apps	(Gls)
2014–2016	La Equidad	2	(0)
2016–	Deportes Tolima	115	(0)
- * Club domestic league appearances and goals as of 16 May 2025

William Cuesta (born February 19, 1993) is a Colombian footballer who plays as a goalkeeper, and his current club is Deportes Tolima from Categoría Primera A.

== Career statistics ==
=== Club ===
As of match played 23 December 2024

Appearances and goals by club, season and competition
Club	Season	League			National cup		Continental		Other		Total	
Club	Season	Division	Apps	Goals	Apps	Goals	Apps	Goals	Apps	Goals	Apps	Goals
La Equidad	2015	Categoría Primera A	0	0	—		—		—		0	0
La Equidad	2016	Categoría Primera A	0	0	2	0	—		—		2	0
La Equidad	Total		0	0	2	0	—		—		2	0
Deportes Tolima	2016	Categoría Primera A	0	0	—		0	0	—		0	0
Deportes Tolima	2017	Categoría Primera A	0	0	1	0	0	0	—		1	0
Deportes Tolima	2018	Categoría Primera A	1	0	—		—		—		1	0
Deportes Tolima	2019	Categoría Primera A	18	0	3	0	0	0	0	0	21	0
Deportes Tolima	2020	Categoría Primera A	4	0	0	0	0	0	—		4	0
Deportes Tolima	2021	Categoría Primera A	24	0	4	0	1 (Note: Appearance(s) in Copa Sudamericana)	0	—		29	0
Deportes Tolima	2022	Categoría Primera A	35	0	2	0	1 (Note: Appearance(s) in Copa Libertadores)	0	2 (Note: Appearance(s) in Superliga Colombiana)	0	40	0
Deportes Tolima	2023	Categoría Primera A	10	0	—		1	0	—		11	0
Deportes Tolima	2024	Categoría Primera A	21	0	—		0	0	—		321	0
Deportes Tolima	Total		95	0	10	0	3	0	2	0	110	0
Career Total			113	0	12	0	3	0	2	0	130	0

== Honours ==
Deportes Tolima

- Categoría Primera A (2) : 2018-I, 2021-I
- Superliga Colombiana (1) : 2022
