= 2015 Copa Colombia =

Copa Águila 2015

Tournament details
- Country: Colombia
- Teams: 36

Final positions
- Champions: Junior (1st title)
- Runners-up: Santa Fe
- 2016 Copa Sudamericana: Junior

Tournament statistics
- Top goal scorer(s): Carlos Ibargüen; Rafael Santos Borré (5 goals each one)

The 2015 Copa Colombia, officially the 2015 Copa Águila for sponsorship reasons, was the 13th edition of the Copa Colombia, the national cup competition for clubs of DIMAYOR. It began on 18 February and ended on 19 November. The tournament comprised a total of 36 teams, and the winner, Junior, who defeated Santa Fe 2–1 on aggregate score in the final, earned a berth to the 2016 Copa Sudamericana.

== Format ==
Unlike the previous seven Copa Colombia editions, the 2015 competition featured a change in its format. According to the format approved by DIMAYOR at its Extraordinary Assembly on October 7, 2014, the first stage was played by 32 teams, which were split into eight groups of four teams each on a regional basis, where teams played each other of the teams in their group twice. The 8 group winners plus the best 4 second-placed teams joined the teams qualified for the 2015 Copa Libertadores (Atlético Nacional, Santa Fe, and Once Caldas) and the 2014 aggregate table best team not qualified for the Copa Libertadores (Águilas Doradas) in the round of 16, from where the cup continued on a home-and-away knockout basis.

== Group stage ==
=== Group A ===
Pos	Team	Pld	W	D	L	GF	GA	GD	Pts	Qualification	JUN	RCA	BAR	UAU
1	Junior	6	2	3	1	9	7	+2	9	Advance to knockout stage	—	2–1	2–2	1–1
2	Real Cartagena	6	2	3	1	8	6	+2	9	Advance to knockout stage	1–0	—	1–1	1–1
3	Barranquilla	6	1	5	0	10	9	+1	8		2–2	2–2	—	2–1
4	Uniautónoma	6	0	3	3	4	9	−5	3		0–2	0–2	1–1	—

Source: DIMAYOR
Rules for classification: 1) Points, 2) Goal difference, 3) Goals for, 4) Away goals for, 5) Goals against, 6) Drawing of lots

=== Group B ===
Pos	Team	Pld	W	D	L	GF	GA	GD	Pts	Qualification	DIM	ENV	JAG	LEO
1	Independiente Medellín	6	2	3	1	6	4	+2	9	Advance to knockout stage	—	1–2	2–0	1–1
2	Envigado	6	2	3	1	6	5	+1	9	Advance to knockout stage	1–1	—	0–1	1–1
3	Jaguares	6	2	1	3	4	6	−2	7		0–0	0–1	—	0–1
4	Leones	6	1	3	2	6	7	−1	6		0–1	1–1	2–3	—

Source: DIMAYOR
Rules for classification: 1) Points, 2) Goal difference, 3) Goals for, 4) Away goals for, 5) Goals against, 6) Drawing of lots

=== Group C ===
Pos	Team	Pld	W	D	L	GF	GA	GD	Pts	Qualification	BUC	RSA	CUC	APE
1	Atlético Bucaramanga	6	4	2	0	14	5	+9	14	Advance to knockout stage	—	1–1	2–0	3–2
2	Real Santander	6	2	2	2	8	9	−1	8		1–1	—	1–5	2–1
3	Cúcuta Deportivo	6	2	1	3	7	8	−1	7		1–2	0–3	—	0–0
4	Alianza Petrolera	6	1	1	4	4	11	−7	4		0–5	1–0	0–1	—

Source: DIMAYOR
Rules for classification: 1) Points, 2) Goal difference, 3) Goals for, 4) Away goals for, 5) Goals against, 6) Drawing of lots

=== Group D ===
Pos	Team	Pld	W	D	L	GF	GA	GD	Pts	Qualification	PAS	MAG	UPO	VAL
1	Deportivo Pasto	6	3	2	1	7	3	+4	11	Advance to knockout stage	—	2–0	2–0	1–0
2	Unión Magdalena	6	2	3	1	3	3	0	9		0–0	—	1–0	2–1
3	Universitario de Popayán	6	1	3	2	4	6	−2	6		2–1	0–0	—	1–1
4	Valledupar	6	0	4	2	4	6	−2	4		1–1	0–0	1–1	—

Source: DIMAYOR
Rules for classification: 1) Points, 2) Goal difference, 3) Goals for, 4) Away goals for, 5) Goals against, 6) Drawing of lots

=== Group E ===
Pos	Team	Pld	W	D	L	GF	GA	GD	Pts	Qualification	COR	CAL	AME	DEP
1	Cortuluá	6	4	0	2	12	12	0	12	Advance to knockout stage	—	3–2	2–1	4–3
2	Deportivo Cali	6	3	1	2	15	11	+4	10	Advance to knockout stage	2–0	—	2–0	3–1
3	América	6	3	1	2	11	10	+1	10		3–1	3–3	—	2–1
4	Depor	6	1	0	5	11	16	−5	3		1–2	4–3	1–2	—

Source: DIMAYOR
Rules for classification: 1) Points, 2) Goal difference, 3) Goals for, 4) Away goals for, 5) Goals against, 6) Drawing of lots

=== Group F ===
Pos	Team	Pld	W	D	L	GF	GA	GD	Pts	Qualification	BOY	PAT	LLA	FOR
1	Boyacá Chicó	6	4	1	1	7	4	+3	13	Advance to knockout stage	—	1–0	1–0	1–0
2	Patriotas	6	3	1	2	6	4	+2	10	Advance to knockout stage	2–1	—	1–0	1–2
3	Llaneros	6	1	3	2	3	4	−1	6		1–1	0–0	—	2–1
4	Fortaleza	6	1	1	4	4	8	−4	4		1–2	0–2	0–0	—

Source: DIMAYOR
Rules for classification: 1) Points, 2) Goal difference, 3) Goals for, 4) Away goals for, 5) Goals against, 6) Drawing of lots

=== Group G ===
Pos	Team	Pld	W	D	L	GF	GA	GD	Pts	Qualification	EQU	MIL	EXP	BOG
1	La Equidad	6	2	3	1	7	5	+2	9	Advance to knockout stage	—	0–0	1–2	1–1
2	Millonarios	6	2	2	2	7	7	0	8		1–3	—	1–1	2–1
3	Expreso Rojo	6	2	2	2	7	8	−1	8		0–1	2–1	—	2–2
4	Bogotá	6	1	3	2	7	8	−1	6		1–1	0–2	2–0	—

Source: DIMAYOR
Rules for classification: 1) Points, 2) Goal difference, 3) Goals for, 4) Away goals for, 5) Goals against, 6) Drawing of lots

=== Group H ===
Pos	Team	Pld	W	D	L	GF	GA	GD	Pts	Qualification	TOL	QUI	HUI	PER
1	Deportes Tolima	6	2	3	1	10	7	+3	9	Advance to knockout stage	—	1–1	3–3	2–0
2	Deportes Quindío	6	2	3	1	7	8	−1	9		2–1	—	0–3	1–0
3	Atlético Huila	6	2	2	2	13	11	+2	8		0–2	3–3	—	3–1
4	Deportivo Pereira	6	1	2	3	4	8	−4	5		1–1	0–0	2–1	—

Source: DIMAYOR
Rules for classification: 1) Points, 2) Goal difference, 3) Goals for, 4) Away goals for, 5) Goals against, 6) Drawing of lots

=== Ranking of second-placed teams ===
The four best teams among those ranked second qualified for the knockout stage.

Pos	Grp	Team	Pld	W	D	L	GF	GA	GD	Pts	Result
1	E	Deportivo Cali	6	3	1	2	15	11	+4	10	Knockout stage
2	F	Patriotas	6	3	1	2	6	4	+2	10	Knockout stage
3	A	Real Cartagena	6	2	3	1	8	6	+2	9	Knockout stage
4	B	Envigado	6	2	3	1	6	5	+1	9	Knockout stage
5	D	Unión Magdalena	6	2	3	1	3	3	0	9	
6	H	Deportes Quindío	6	2	3	1	7	8	−1	9	
7	G	Millonarios	6	2	2	2	7	7	0	8	
8	C	Real Santander	6	2	2	2	8	9	−1	8	

Source: DIMAYOR
Rules for classification: 1) Points, 2) Goal difference, 3) Goals for, 4) Away goals for, 5) Goals against, 6) Drawing of lots

== Knockout phase ==
Each tie in the knockout phase is played in home-and-away two-legged format. In each tie, the team which has the better overall record up to that stage host the second leg, except in the round of 16 where the group winners automatically host the second leg. In case of a tie in aggregate score, neither the away goals rule nor extra time is applied, and the tie is decided by a penalty shoot-out. Atlético Nacional, Santa Fe, Once Caldas, and Águilas Doradas entered the competition in the Round of 16, being joined there by the eight group winners and the four best second-placed teams.

=== Bracket ===
Round of 16
Cortuluá	1	1	2
Águilas Doradas	0	0	0
La Equidad	0	0	0
Santa Fe	1	1	2
Atlético Bucaramanga	0	1	1
Once Caldas	1	2	3
Deportivo Pasto	1	4	5
Real Cartagena	1	1	2
Boyacá Chicó	0	1	1
Deportivo Cali	2	2	4
Independiente Medellín	2	2	4
Envigado	1	1	2
Deportes Tolima	2	2	4
Patriotas	1	0	1
Junior	0	2	2
Atlético Nacional	1	0	1

Quarterfinals
Cortuluá	0	0	0
Santa Fe	3	0	3
Once Caldas (p)	2	0	2 (3)
Deportivo Pasto	2	0	2 (2)
Deportivo Cali	0	0	0
Independiente Medellín	2	0	2
Deportes Tolima	1	1	2
Junior	2	1	3

Semifinals
Santa Fe	0	3	3
Once Caldas	1	1	2
Independiente Medellín	1	2	3 (4)
Junior (p)	2	1	3 (5)

Final
Santa Fe	0	1	1
Junior	2	0	2

=== Round of 16 ===
First legs: July 15; Second legs: July 29. Group winners (Team 2) hosted the second leg.

Team 1	Agg.	Team 2	1st leg	2nd leg
Deportivo Cali	4–1	Boyacá Chicó	2–0	2–1
Águilas Doradas	0–2	Cortuluá	0–1	0–1
Patriotas	1–4	Deportes Tolima	1–2	0–2
Once Caldas	3–1	Atlético Bucaramanga	1–0	2–1
Envigado	2–4	Independiente Medellín	1–2	1–2
Santa Fe	2–0	La Equidad	1–0	1–0
Atlético Nacional	1–2	Junior	1–0	0–2
Real Cartagena	2–5	Deportivo Pasto	1–1	1–4

=== Quarterfinals ===
First legs: August 5, 12; Second legs: August 26, September 2. Team 2 hosted the second leg.

Team 1	Agg.	Team 2	1st leg	2nd leg
Independiente Medellín	2–0	Deportivo Cali	2–0	0–0
Santa Fe	3–0	Cortuluá	3–0	0–0
Junior	3–2	Deportes Tolima	2–1	1–1
Deportivo Pasto	2–2 (2–3 p)	Once Caldas	2–2	0–0

=== Semifinals ===
First legs: September 23, October 7; Second legs: September 30, October 15. Team 2 hosted the second leg.

Team 1	Agg.	Team 2	1st leg	2nd leg
Once Caldas	2–3	Santa Fe	1–0	1–3
Junior	3–3 (5–4 p)	Independiente Medellín	2–1	1–2

=== Final ===
First leg: November 11; Second leg: November 19. Team 2 hosted the second leg.

Team 1	Agg.	Team 2	1st leg	2nd leg
Junior	2–1	Santa Fe	2–0	0–1

== Top goalscorers ==
Rank	Name	Club	Goals
1	(Colombia) Carlos Ibargüen	Cortuluá	5
1	(Colombia) Rafael Santos Borré	Deportivo Cali	5
2	(Colombia) Feiver Mercado	América	4
2	(Colombia) Antony Otero	Expreso Rojo	4
2	(Colombia) Jesús Rodríguez	Barranquilla	4
2	(Argentina) Hernán Hechalar	Independiente Medellín	4

Source: Soccerway.com
