= Carlos Robles (Colombian footballer) =

Colombian footballer (born 1992)

Personal information
- Full name: Carlos Robles Rocha
- Date of birth: 15 May 1992 (age 34)
- Place of birth: Valledupar, Colombia
- Height: 1.83 m (6 ft 0 in)
- Position: Midfielder

Team information
- Current team: The Strongest
- Number: 24

Youth career
- Valledupar

Senior career*
Years	Team	Apps	(Gls)
2008–2009	Valledupar	?	(?)
2009–2015	Deportes Quindío	86	(1)
2013–2014	→ Once Caldas	18	(2)
2015	Partizani Tirana	5	(0)
2016–2017	Atlético Huila	66	(4)
2018–2020	Deportes Tolima	86	(5)
2021–2022	Deportivo Cali	48	(3)
2023–	The Strongest	9	(0)

International career
2009	Colombia U17	8	(0)
- * Club domestic league appearances and goals as of 21:09, 5 May 2023 (UTC)

Carlos Robles Rocha (born 15 May 1992) is a Colombian professional footballer who plays as a midfielder for Deportes Tolima.

== Club career ==
=== Partizani Tirana ===
On 29 September 2015, Robles signed a one-year contract with Albanian side Partizani Tirana for an undisclosed side, taking the vacant number 11 for the 2015–16 season. Robles was an unused substitute in "Tirana derby" against Tirana, where Partizani won 1–0.

He made his debut in Albanian top flight on 17 October during the 1–2 away win against the newcomers of Bylis Ballsh. He came on the field in the 61st minute, replacing the Italian striker Emanuele Morini.

Robles was released by the club on 2 February 2016 after failing to make an impact there, playing only seven matches between league and cup.

== International career ==
Robles has been a former youth member of Colombia national team, appearing eight time with Under-17 side in 2009. He played five matches in 2009 FIFA U-17 World Cup in an eventual semi-final exit against Switzerland U17.

== Career statistics ==
=== Club ===
As of 2 February 2016

Club	Season	League		Cup (Note: Including cup competitions, such as Copa Colombia and Albanian Cup)		Continental		Other		Total	
Club	Season	Apps	Goals	Apps	Goals	Apps	Goals	Apps	Goals	Apps	Goals
Deportes Quindío	2009	6	0	0	0	—		—		6	0
Deportes Quindío	2010	6	0	0	0	—		—		6	0
Deportes Quindío	2011	20	1	8	0	—		—		28	1
Deportes Quindío	2012	30	0	9	2	—		—		39	2
Deportes Quindío	2013	13	0	9	3	—		—		22	3
Deportes Quindío	Total	75	1	26	5	—		—		101	6
Once Caldas	2013	10	1	0	0	—		—		10	1
Once Caldas	2014	8	1	0	0	—		—		8	1
Once Caldas	Total	18	2	0	0	—		—		18	2
Deportes Quindío	2014	11	0	7	0	—		—		18	0
Deportes Quindío	Total	11	0	7	0	—		—		18	0
Partizani Tirana	2015–16	5	0	2	0	—		—		7	0
Partizani Tirana	Total	5	0	2	0	—		—		7	0
Career total		109	3	35	5	0	0	0	0	144	8

== Honours ==
=== Club ===
Deportes Quindío

- Categoría Primera B: Runner-up 2014

=== International ===
Colombia U17

- FIFA U-17 World Cup: Fourth place 2009.
