= José Luis Chunga =

Colombian footballer (born 1991)

Personal information
- Full name: José Luis Chunga Vega
- Date of birth: 11 July 1991 (age 35)
- Place of birth: Barranquilla, ATL, Colombia
- Height: 1.83 m (6 ft 0 in)
- Position: Goalkeeper

Team information
- Current team: Independiente Medellín
- Number: 12

Youth career
- Atlético Junior

Senior career*
Years	Team	Apps	(Gls)
2011–2020	Atlético Junior	30	(0)
2021	Jaguares de Córdoba	12	(0)
2021–2023	Alianza Petrolera	74	(2)
2023-	Independiente Medellín	20	(0)

International career^{‡}
2022–	Colombia	3	(0)
- * Club domestic league appearances and goals as of 18 August 2023 ‡ National team caps and goals as of 19 January 2022

José Luis Chunga Vega (born 11 July 1991) is a Colombian professional footballer who plays as a goalkeeper for Categoría Primera A club Independiente Medellín and the Colombia national football team.

== Club career ==
His beginnings in football were in Barranquilla F.C., Atlético Junior's subsidiary team in the First B Category, being part of the payroll in the 2009 1 and 2010 seasons, 2 in which he debuted as a professional.

His good performances in Primera B 2010 allowed him to be promoted to the professional Junior roster since 2011, in which he has won 2 league titles, 2 cup championships, 1 Copa Sudamericana subtitle and 2 Super Leagues.

== International career ==
Chunga made his debut for the Colombia national team on 16 January 2022 in a 2–1 home win over Honduras.

== Career statistics ==
As of 26 November 2023

Club	Division	League			Cup		Continental		Total	
Club	Division	Season	Apps	Goals	Apps	Goals	Apps	Goals	Apps	Goals
Barranquilla	Categoría Primera B	2009	11	0	—		—		11	0
Barranquilla	Categoría Primera B	2010	31	0	—		—		31	0
Barranquilla	Total		42	0	—		—		42	0
Atlético Junior	Categoría Primera A	2011	—		4	0	—		4	0
Atlético Junior	Categoría Primera A	2012	—		3	0	1	0	4	0
Atlético Junior	Categoría Primera A	2013	—		2	0	—		2	0
Atlético Junior	Categoría Primera A	2014	1	0	5	0	—		6	0
Atlético Junior	Categoría Primera A	2015	3	0	6	0	—		9	0
Atlético Junior	Categoría Primera A	2016	3	0	6	0	—		9	0
Atlético Junior	Categoría Primera A	2017	4	0	6	0	—		10	0
Atlético Junior	Categoría Primera A	2018	12	0	1	0	2	0	15	0
Atlético Junior	Categoría Primera A	2019	6	0	3	0	—		9	0
Atlético Junior	Categoría Primera A	2020	1	0	—		—		1	0
Atlético Junior	Total		30	0	36	0	3	0	69	0
Jaguares de Córdoba	Categoría Primera A	2021	12	0	—		—		12	0
Alianza Petrolera	Categoría Primera A	2021	25	0	3	0	—		28	0
Alianza Petrolera	Categoría Primera A	2022	27	2	—		—		27	2
Alianza Petrolera	Categoría Primera A	2023	22	0	—		—		22	0
Alianza Petrolera	Total		74	2	3	0	—		77	2
Independiente Medellín	Categoría Primera A	2023	20	0	2	0	—		22	0
Career total			178	2	41	0	3	0	222	2
