= 2017 Copa Colombia =

Copa Águila 2017

Tournament details
- Country: Colombia
- Teams: 36

Final positions
- Champions: Junior (2nd title)
- Runners-up: Independiente Medellín
- Copa Libertadores: Junior

Tournament statistics
- Matches played: 126
- Goals scored: 306 (2.43 per match)
- Top goal scorer(s): 11 players (4 goals each)

The 2017 Copa Colombia, officially the 2017 Copa Águila for sponsorship reasons, was the 15th edition of the Copa Colombia, the national cup competition for clubs of DIMAYOR. The tournament was contested by 36 teams, beginning on 8 March and ending on 8 November. Junior were the champions, winning their second title by beating Independiente Medellín 3–1 on aggregate in the final, and qualified for the 2018 Copa Libertadores. Atlético Nacional were the defending champions, but were eliminated by Patriotas in the quarterfinals.

== Format ==
The competition continued under the format used since the 2015 edition, however, starting from this edition the winner will be entitled to a berth to the next Copa Libertadores instead of the Copa Sudamericana as it had been since 2008. The first stage was played by 32 teams, which were split into eight groups of four teams each on a regional basis, where teams played each other of the teams in their group twice. The 8 group winners plus the best 4 second-placed teams joined four of the teams qualified for the 2017 Copa Libertadores (Atlético Nacional, Independiente Medellín, Santa Fe, and Millonarios) in the round of 16, from where the cup continued on a home-and-away knockout basis.

== Group stage ==
=== Group A ===
Pos	Team	Pld	W	D	L	GF	GA	GD	Pts	Qualification	JUN	JAG	BAR	RCA
1	Junior	6	4	1	1	10	5	+5	13	Advance to knockout stage	—	2–0	2–1	1–2
2	Jaguares	6	2	1	3	5	5	0	7		0–1	—	1–0	1–1
3	Barranquilla	6	1	3	2	5	6	−1	6		2–2	1–0	—	1–1
4	Real Cartagena	6	1	3	2	4	8	−4	6		0–2	0–3	0–0	—

Source: Dimayor
Rules for classification: 1) Points, 2) Goal difference, 3) Goals for, 4) Away goals for, 5) Goals against, 6) Drawing of lots

=== Group B ===
Pos	Team	Pld	W	D	L	GF	GA	GD	Pts	Qualification	RIO	ONC	ENV	LEO
1	Rionegro Águilas	6	3	3	0	6	1	+5	12	Advanced to knockout stage	—	0–0	1–0	0–0
2	Once Caldas	6	3	2	1	8	5	+3	11	Advanced to knockout stage	0–1	—	4–2	2–2
3	Envigado	6	1	2	3	5	8	−3	5		1–1	0–1	—	1–0
4	Leones	6	0	3	3	3	8	−5	3		0–3	0–1	1–1	—

Source: Dimayor
Rules for classification: 1) Points, 2) Goal difference, 3) Goals for, 4) Away goals for, 5) Goals against, 6) Drawing of lots

=== Group C ===
Pos	Team	Pld	W	D	L	GF	GA	GD	Pts	Qualification	APE	MAG	BUC	RSA
1	Alianza Petrolera	6	5	0	1	11	4	+7	15	Advanced to knockout stage	—	1–0	2–0	3–0
2	Unión Magdalena	6	4	0	2	8	4	+4	12	Advanced to knockout stage	2–1	—	1–0	4–1
3	Atlético Bucaramanga	6	3	0	3	9	6	+3	9		1–2	1–0	—	3–1
4	Real Santander	6	0	0	6	3	17	−14	0		1–2	0–1	0–4	—

Source: Dimayor
Rules for classification: 1) Points, 2) Goal difference, 3) Goals for, 4) Away goals for, 5) Goals against, 6) Drawing of lots

=== Group D ===
Pos	Team	Pld	W	D	L	GF	GA	GD	Pts	Qualification	PAS	UPO	COR	VAL
1	Deportivo Pasto	6	3	1	2	10	8	+2	10	Advanced to knockout stage	—	4–1	1–0	2–1
2	Universitario de Popayán	6	3	0	3	7	9	−2	9		3–1	—	0–3	1–0
3	Cortuluá	6	2	2	2	6	5	+1	8		1–0	0–2	—	0–0
4	Valledupar	6	1	3	2	6	7	−1	6		2–2	1–0	2–2	—

Source: Dimayor
Rules for classification: 1) Points, 2) Goal difference, 3) Goals for, 4) Away goals for, 5) Goals against, 6) Drawing of lots

=== Group E ===
Pos	Team	Pld	W	D	L	GF	GA	GD	Pts	Qualification	CAL	AME	ORS	ATL
1	Deportivo Cali	6	4	1	1	13	7	+6	13	Advanced to knockout stage	—	1–0	2–1	3–0
2	América de Cali	6	3	2	1	13	8	+5	11	Advanced to knockout stage	3–3	—	2–2	2–0
3	Orsomarso	6	3	1	2	10	10	0	10		2–1	0–3	—	2–1
4	Atlético	6	0	0	6	5	16	−11	0		1–3	2–3	1–3	—

Source: Dimayor
Rules for classification: 1) Points, 2) Goal difference, 3) Goals for, 4) Away goals for, 5) Goals against, 6) Drawing of lots

=== Group F ===
Pos	Team	Pld	W	D	L	GF	GA	GD	Pts	Qualification	PAT	LLA	FOR	BOY
1	Patriotas	6	4	1	1	12	6	+6	13	Advanced to knockout stage	—	2–0	3–1	1–1
2	Llaneros	6	3	1	2	11	9	+2	10		4–1	—	2–0	2–2
3	Fortaleza	6	2	1	3	6	8	−2	7		0–1	2–0	—	2–1
4	Boyacá Chicó	6	0	3	3	7	13	−6	3		0–4	2–3	1–1	—

Source: Dimayor
Rules for classification: 1) Points, 2) Goal difference, 3) Goals for, 4) Away goals for, 5) Goals against, 6) Drawing of lots

=== Group G ===
Pos	Team	Pld	W	D	L	GF	GA	GD	Pts	Qualification	EQU	CUC	TIG	BOG
1	La Equidad	6	5	0	1	13	7	+6	15	Advanced to knockout stage	—	4–2	3–2	2–0
2	Cúcuta Deportivo	6	3	2	1	8	7	+1	11	Advanced to knockout stage	1–0	—	1–1	1–0
3	Tigres	6	2	2	2	9	8	+1	8		0–1	1–1	—	3–1
4	Bogotá	6	0	0	6	5	13	−8	0		2–3	1–2	1–2	—

Source: Dimayor
Rules for classification: 1) Points, 2) Goal difference, 3) Goals for, 4) Away goals for, 5) Goals against, 6) Drawing of lots

=== Group H ===
Pos	Team	Pld	W	D	L	GF	GA	GD	Pts	Qualification	HUI	TOL	QUI	PER
1	Atlético Huila	6	4	0	2	7	5	+2	12	Advanced to knockout stage	—	1–0	2–1	1–0
2	Deportes Tolima	6	3	1	2	9	7	+2	10		1–0	—	2–2	3–2
3	Deportes Quindío	6	2	2	2	8	9	−1	8		2–1	1–3	—	2–1
4	Deportivo Pereira	6	1	1	4	5	8	−3	4		1–2	1–0	0–0	—

Source: Dimayor
Rules for classification: 1) Points, 2) Goal difference, 3) Goals for, 4) Away goals for, 5) Goals against, 6) Drawing of lots

=== Ranking of second-placed teams ===
The four best teams among those ranked second qualified for the knockout stage.

Pos	Grp	Team	Pld	W	D	L	GF	GA	GD	Pts	Result
1	C	Unión Magdalena	6	4	0	2	8	4	+4	12	Knockout stage
2	E	América de Cali	6	3	2	1	13	8	+5	11	Knockout stage
3	B	Once Caldas	6	3	2	1	8	5	+3	11	Knockout stage
4	G	Cúcuta Deportivo	6	3	2	1	8	7	+1	11	Knockout stage
5	F	Llaneros	6	3	1	2	11	9	+2	10	
6	H	Deportes Tolima	6	3	1	2	9	7	+2	10	
7	D	Universitario de Popayán	6	3	0	3	7	9	−2	9	
8	A	Jaguares	6	2	1	3	5	5	0	7	

Source: Dimayor
Rules for classification: 1) Points, 2) Goal difference, 3) Goals for, 4) Away goals for, 5) Goals against, 6) Drawing of lots

== Knockout stage ==
Each tie in the knockout stage was played in a home-and-away two-legged format. In each tie, the team which had the better overall record up to that stage hosted the second leg, except in the round of 16 where the group winners automatically hosted the second leg. In case of a tie in aggregate score, neither the away goals rule nor extra time are applied, and the tie is decided by a penalty shoot-out. Atlético Nacional, Independiente Medellin, Santa Fe, and Millonarios entered the competition in the Round of 16, being joined there by the eight group winners and the four best second-placed teams.

=== Bracket ===
Round of 16
Junior	1	3	4
Once Caldas	0	0	0
Alianza Petrolera	0	2	2
Millonarios	2	2	4
Atlético Huila	0	1	1
Atlético Nacional	2	1	3
Patriotas (p)	2	1	3 (4)
Unión Magdalena	3	0	3 (3)
Deportivo Cali	3	3	6
Cúcuta Deportivo	3	1	4
Rionegro Águilas	0	0	0
América de Cali	1	0	1
La Equidad	0	1	1
Santa Fe	0	2	2
Deportivo Pasto	0	2	2 (5)
Independiente Medellín (p)	1	1	2 (6)

Quarterfinals
Junior	0	1	1
Millonarios	0	0	0
Atlético Nacional	2	1	3
Patriotas	3	1	4
Deportivo Cali	1	0	1
América de Cali	0	0	0
Santa Fe	1	0	1 (0)
Independiente Medellín (p)	1	0	1 (2)

Semifinals
Junior	1	1	2
Patriotas	1	0	1
Deportivo Cali	1	2	3 (4)
Independiente Medellín (p)	1	2	3 (5)

Final
Junior	1	2	3
Independiente Medellín	1	0	1

=== Round of 16 ===
First legs: July 5, 12 and 13; Second legs: July 26, 27, August 2 and 3. Group winners (Team 2) hosted the second leg.

Team 1	Agg.	Team 2	1st leg	2nd leg
Once Caldas	0–4	Junior	0–1	0–3
Cúcuta Deportivo	4–6	Deportivo Cali	3–3	1–3
Atlético Nacional	3–1	Atlético Huila	2–0	1–1
Santa Fe	2–1	La Equidad	0–0	2–1
Millonarios	4–2	Alianza Petrolera	2–0	2–2
América de Cali	1–0	Rionegro Águilas	1–0	0–0
Unión Magdalena	3–3 (3–4 p)	Patriotas	3–2	0–1
Independiente Medellín	2–2 (6–5 p)	Deportivo Pasto	1–0	1–2

=== Quarterfinals ===
First legs: August 9, 10 and 23; Second legs: August 23, 24 and 30. Team 2 hosted the second leg.

Team 1	Agg.	Team 2	1st leg	2nd leg
Millonarios	0–1	Junior	0–0	0–1
América de Cali	0–1	Deportivo Cali	0–1	0–0
Patriotas	4–3	Atlético Nacional	3–2	1–1
Independiente Medellín	1–1 (2–0 p)	Santa Fe	1–1	0–0

=== Semifinals ===
First legs: September 14 and October 8; Second legs: September 27 and October 11. Team 2 hosted the second leg.

Team 1	Agg.	Team 2	1st leg	2nd leg
Independiente Medellín	3–3 (5–4 p)	Deportivo Cali	1–1	2–2
Patriotas	1–2	Junior	1–1	0–1

=== Final ===
First leg: October 18; Second leg: November 8. Team 2 hosted the second leg.

Team 1	Agg.	Team 2	1st leg	2nd leg
Independiente Medellín	1–3	Junior	1–1	0–2

== Top goalscorers ==
Rank	Name	Club	Goals
1	(Colombia) Dayro Moreno	Atlético Nacional	4
1	(Colombia) Diego Álvarez	La Equidad	4
1	(Colombia) Jefferson Duque	Deportivo Cali	4
1	(Colombia) Marco Pérez	Deportes Tolima	4
1	(Colombia) Martín Arzuaga	Valledupar	4
1	(Colombia) Diego Echeverri	Cúcuta Deportivo	4
1	(Colombia) Edis Ibargüen	Patriotas	4
1	(Colombia) César Valoyes	Patriotas	4
1	(Colombia) Miguel Ángel Murillo	Deportivo Cali	4
1	(Colombia) Carlos Rodríguez	Patriotas	4
1	(Colombia) Jarlan Barrera	Junior	4

Source: Resultados.com

== See also ==
- 2017 Categoría Primera A season
- 2017 Categoría Primera B season
